= 2017–18 Investec Women's Hockey Premier Division season =

English field hockey season

The 2017–18 Investec Women's Hockey Premier Division season ran from 23 September 2017 until 25 March 2018 with a winter break in December and January for the Indoor season.

== Regular season ==
=== Final table ===
Pos	Team	P	W	D	L	GF	GA	GD	Pts
1	Surbiton	18	10	4	4	38	21	17	34
2	Holcombe	18	8	7	3	25	20	5	31
3	East Grinstead	18	9	2	7	27	22	5	29
4	Buckingham	18	8	5	5	34	33	1	29
5	University of Birmingham	18	8	4	6	35	26	9	28
6	Canterbury	18	4	8	6	28	29	-1	20
7	Bowdon Hightown	18	5	5	8	15	21	-6	20
8	Clifton Robinsons	18	4	6	8	28	38	-10	18
9	Slough	18	4	6	8	16	31	-15	18
10	Leicester	18	3	7	8	23	28	-5	16

= Qualified for League finals weekend
= Playoff Position
= Relegated

=== Results ===
Home \ Away	Bow	Buc	Can	Cli	EG	Hol	Lei	Slo	Sub	Bir
Bowdon	—	0–1	1–0	2–2	0–2	2–1	1–2	0–0	0–0	0–1
Buckingham	3–1	—	4–2	3–2	1–3	0–0	2–2	4–1	1–0	2–2
Canterbury	1–0	3–2	—	1–2	2–2	1–1	1–1	1–1	2–2	4–2
Clifton Robinsons	3–0	3–4	1–1	—	3–4	1–1	2–0	0–0	1–3	1–4
East Grinstead	1–2	3–1	2–0	0–2	—	0–0	2–1	1–0	0–2	3–0
Holcombe	1–0	3–3	0–5	3–0	1–0	—	1–1	3–0	1–3	3–1
Leicester	1–2	0–0	4–1	2–2	2–0	1–1	—	1–2	1–2	2–2
Slough	0–0	3–1	1–0	2–2	1–3	0–1	2–1	—	1–8	0–1
Surbiton	1–1	1–2	1–1	3–1	3–1	1–2	1–0	4–2	—	2–1
University of Birmingham	1–3	4–0	2–2	5–0	1–0	1–2	4–1	0–0	3–1	—

Legend: Blue = home team win; Yellow = draw; Red = away team win.

== League Finals Weekend ==
=== Semi-finals ===
Date	Team 1	Team 2	Score
Apr 28	Surbiton	Buckingham	3-0
Apr 28	Holcombe	East Grinstead	2-1

=== Final ===
Date	Team 1	Team 2	Score
Apr 29	Surbiton	Holcombe	3-1

=== Final details ===
- Surbiton
- Scorers: Sarah Page 8-F, Hollie Pearne-Webb 10-PC, Beckie Middleton 26-PC
- Squad: Giselle Ansley, Georgie Twigg (Capt.), Jo Hunter, Hannah Martin, Emily Atkinson, Emily Defroand, Beckie Middleton, Hollie Pearne-Webb, Holly Payne, Alice Sharp, Abi Walker (GK). Subs: Sarah Page (7 mins), Robyn Collins (9), Olivia Chilton (14), Jenna Woolven (14), Anabel Herzsprung (20), Stephanie Addison (23), Ellie Shahbo (GK) (60)
- Holcombe
- Scorer: Heather McEwan (FG35)

== EH Women's Championship Cup ==
=== Quarter-finals ===
Team 1	Team 2	Score
Buckingham	University of Birmingham	4-0
Bowdon	Brooklands Poynton	1-3
Clifton Robinsons	Reading	2-0
Hampstead & Westminster	Surbiton	2-4

=== Semi-finals ===
Team 1	Team 2	Score
Surbiton	Brooklands Poynton	2-0
Clifton Robinsons	Buckingham	2-2 (8-7 pens)

=== Final ===
(Held at Lee Valley Hockey and Tennis Centre on 5 May)

Team 1	Team 2	Score
Surbiton	Clifton Robinsons	5-0

Surbiton
Scorers- (Pearne-Webb (2), Middleton (2), Page)
Squad - Giselle Ansley, Stephanie Addison, Georgie Twigg, Jo Hunter, Hannah Martin, Emily Atkinson, Olivia Chilton, Beckie Middleton, Sarah Page, Hollie Pearne-Webb, Holly Payne, Alice Sharp, Robyn Collins, Ella Burnley, Anabel Herzsprung, Ellie Shahbo
Clifton
Squad - Sarah Ellis, Nicola Moss, Harriet Smith, Isabel Palmer, Zoe Leach, Joanna Leigh, Abigail Porter, Claire Thomas, Kate Holmes, Holly Savage, Hannah Coulson, Victoria McCabe, Elena Emo, Louisa Bell

== See also ==
- 2017–18 Men's England Hockey League season
