= 2014–15 England Hockey League season =

English field hockey season

2014–15 England Hockey League

The 2014–15 English Hockey League season took place from September 2014 until April 2015. The regular season consisted of two periods September until December and then February until March. The end of season playoffs were held on the 18 & 19 of April. The Men's Championship was won by Wimbledon and the Women's Championship was won by Surbiton.

The Men's Cup was won by Reading and the Women's Cup was won by Surbiton.

== Men's Premier Division League Standings ==
Pos	Team	P	W	D	L	F	A	GD	Pts
1	East Grinstead	18	14	2	2	77	36	41	44
2	Surbiton	18	14	2	2	70	33	37	44
3	Wimbledon	18	11	2	5	55	35	20	35
4	Beeston	18	11	1	6	50	34	16	34
5	Cannock	18	6	3	9	34	49	-15	20*
6	Reading	18	5	4	9	35	51	-16	19
7	Hampstead and Westminster	18	4	5	9	28	35	-7	17
8	Brooklands Manchester University	18	5	1	12	35	66	-31	16
9	Canterbury	18	5	0	13	44	67	-23	15
10	Southgate	18	3	4	11	22	44	-22	13

= Qualified for League finals weekend
= Relegated

=== Results ===
Home \ Away	Bee	Bro	Can	Can	EG	HW	Rea	Sou	Sub	Wim
Beeston	—	7–1	3–1	6–2	2–3	1–1	2–3	2–1	2–4	1–3
Brooklands MU	1–2	—	1–2	3–4	2–5	3–2	5–4	1–2	1–7	1–4
Cannock	2–4	3–3	—	1–3	3–4	5–2	0–0	2–0	1–6	2–4
Canterbury	0–2	3–1	1–2	—	4–9	1–2	9–1	1–4	2–6	4–5
East Grinstead	3–2	9–0	4–2	4–0	—	2–2	4–1	4–0	4–0	1–4
Hampstead and Westminster	0–1	0–1	2–3	5–1	3–6	—	2–2	1–0	1–2	2–1
Reading	2–3	1–2	4–1	5–3	2–5	3–2	—	1–1	0–2	1–5
Southgate	0–5	2–4	1–1	1–2	3–2	0–0	2–2	—	1–3	2–3
Surbiton	6–2	6–3	5–0	5–4	3–3	2–0	3–1	6–1	—	1–4
Wimbledon	1–3	3–2	2–3	5–0	3–5	1–1	0–2	4–1	3–3	—

Legend: Blue = home team win; Yellow = draw; Red = away team win.

== Women's Investec Premier Division League Standings ==
Pos	Team	P	W	D	L	F	A	Pts
1	Surbiton	18	15	3	0	48	11	48
2	Canterbury	18	14	2	2	41	13	44
3	Clifton	18	12	3	3	38	19	39
4	Reading	18	8	2	8	26	21	26
5	Holcombe	18	6	7	5	32	27	25
6	University of Birmingham	18	7	4	7	25	25	25
7	Leicester	18	5	4	9	27	31	19
8	Bowdon Hightown	18	3	4	11	17	39	13
9	Buckingham	18	3	1	14	17	44	10
10	Beeston	18	1	2	15	20	61	5

= Qualified for League finals weekend
= Relegated

== Play Offs ==
=== Men's Premier ===
Semi-finals
11 April 2015
East Grinstead	5
Beeston	1
11 April 2015
Surbiton	0
Wimbledon	2

Final
12 April 2015
East Grinstead	5
Wimbledon	8
Third place
12 April 2015
Beeston	1
Surbiton	2

==== Semi-finals ====
11 April 2015
14:15

East Grinstead	5–1	Beeston
Wilson 45'; Griffiths 46'; Pearn 48'; Faulkner 55'; Naughalty 64'	Report	Whiteman 13'

Umpires:
Dan Barstow (ENG)
Hamish Jamson (ENG)

11 April 2015
16:30

Surbiton	0–2	Wimbledon
	Report	Govers 57'; Ebbers 69'

Umpires:
Dave Bowdall (ENG)
Paul Walker (ENG)

==== Third and fourth place ====
12 April 2015
13:00

Beeston	1–2	Surbiton
Blackwell 20'	Report	Forsyth 18', 43'

Umpires:
Bruce Bale (ENG)
Paul Walker (ENG)

==== Final ====
12 April 2015
15:15

East Grinstead	5–8	Wimbledon
Jackson 3', 64', 66'; Wilson 23'; Pearn 33'	Report	Govers 6', 17', 44', 52', 58'; Waller 20'; Brogdon 51'; Ball 54'

Umpires:
Dave Bowdall (ENG)
Hamish Jamson (ENG)

Teams
Wimbledon
James Bailey (gk), Tom Millington (gk), George Farrant, Ben Marsden, Tom Woods, Henry Weir, Luc Cerulus, Ian Sloan, James Osborn, Steve Ebbers, Alastair Brogdon, Ben Hawes (capt), Michael Hoare, Jack Waller, Phil Ball, Chris Gregg, Johnny Kinder, Blake Govers, Coach: David Bunyan

East Grinstead
Patrick Smith (gk), Richard Potton (gk), Mark Pearn, Glenn Kirkham, Tim Deakin, Chris Griffiths, Ashley Jackson, Andrew Piper, Wesley Jackson, David Condon, Will Arthur, Joe Naughalty, Andy Bull, Simon Faulkner, Niall Stott (capt), Ross Stott, Tony Wilson, Rhys Smith, Coach: Karl Stagno

=== Women's Premier ===
Semi-finals
18 April 2015
Surbiton (p.s.o)	2 (4)
Reading	2 (2)
18 April 2015
Canterbury	2
Clifton	1

Final
19 April 2015
Surbiton	2
Canterbury	1
Third place
19 April 2015
Reading	3
Clifton	1

==== Semi-finals ====
18 April 2015
14:15

Surbiton	2–2	Reading
King 7'; Frankland 12'	Report	H. Richardson Walsh 41'; K. Richardson Walsh 61'
Penalties
Twigg (penalty shoot-out scored); Haycroft (penalty shoot-out scored); Tibble (penalty shoot-out missed); Robinson (penalty shoot-out scored); King (penalty shoot-out scored)	4–2	(penalty shoot-out scored) Maguire; (penalty shoot-out missed) Gilbert; (penalty shoot-out scored) H. Richardson Walsh; (penalty shoot-out missed) Thomas

Umpires:
Hannah Sanders (ENG)
Rob Jenkins (ENG)

18 April 2015
16:30

Canterbury	2–1	Clifton
Wilson 21'; Lloyd 21'	Report	Thomas 27'

Umpires:
Frances Block (ENG)
David Howell (ENG)

==== Third and fourth place ====
19 April 2015
13:00

Reading	3–1	Clifton
Thomas 39'; Cockburn 59'; H. Richardson Walsh 63'	Report	Sinton 26'

Umpires:
Stephen Cox (ENG)
Helen Sargeant (ENG)

==== Final ====
19 April 2015
15:15

Surbiton	2–1	Canterbury
King 23'; Robinson 48'	Report	Clewlow 28'

Umpires:
Hannah Sanders (ENG)
Frances Block (ENG)

== Men's Cup ==
=== Quarter-finals ===
Team 1	Team 2	Score
Reading	Southgate	1-0
Surbiton	Beeston	2-2 (4-3 p)
Brooklands MU	Chichester	3-3 (5-4 p)
Cannock	Sheffield Hallam	3-1

=== Semi-finals ===
Team 1	Team 2	Score
Brooklands MU	Reading	2-2 (3-5 p)
Cannock	Surbiton	3-3 (4-5 p)

=== Final ===
(Held at the Lee Valley Hockey & Tennis Centre on 2 May)

Team 1	Team 2	Score
Reading	Surbiton	5-1

== Women's Cup ==
Quarterfinals
Bowdon Hightown	3
Brooklands Poynton	1
Gloucester City	0
Clifton	2
Buckingham	1 (1)
Loughborough Students (pen.)	1 (4)
Surbiton	2
Oxford Hawks	0

Semi-finals
Bowdon Hightown	1
Clifton	2
Loughborough Students	0
Surbiton	2

Final
25 April 2015
Clifton	2
Surbiton	3

=== Final ===
25 April 2015
15:30

Clifton	2–3	Surbiton
Davis 24'; Pearce 58'	Report	Woolven 2'; Robinson 49'; Herbert 67'

Lee Valley Hockey and Tennis Centre
Umpires:
Hannah Sanders (ENG)
Emma Shelbourn (ENG)
