= 2016–17 England Hockey League season =

English field hockey season

The 2016–2017 English Hockey League season took place from September 2016 until April 2017. The regular season consisted of two periods September until December and then February until March. The end of season playoffs known as the League Finals Weekend was held on 22 & 23 April.

Surbiton won the Men's Premier League title despite being 3-0 down in the final against Wimbledon with only 10mins to go. Surbiton also won the Investec Women's Premier League as well as finishing top of the regular season league standings, making it their 4th in a row. Whilst Canterbury finished one off the bottom and survived the relegation playoffs for the 3rd time in a row as Loughborough Students were relegated having just got up into the top flight last season. Sevenoaks beat Team Bath Buccaneers and Durham University to secure promotion and go up to the top flight next season in the men's competition. In the women's Reading got relegated and Buckingham beat Wimbledon and Brooklands Poynton to secure promotion, as Bowdon Hightown won the group to keep their place in the Premier League.

The Men's Cup was won by Reading with the biggest score difference in 15 years against Canterbury in the final. The Investec Women's Cup was won by Surbiton.

== Men's Premier Division League Standings ==
Pos	Team	P	W	D	L	GF	GA	GD	Pts
1	Wimbledon	18	13	4	1	56	32	24	43
2	Holcombe	18	11	3	4	50	30	20	36
3	Surbiton	18	9	8	1	62	39	23	35
4	Hampstead and Westminster	18	9	5	4	54	40	14	32
5	Beeston	18	8	3	7	40	37	3	27
6	East Grinstead	18	8	2	8	52	41	11	26
7	Reading	18	6	4	8	40	45	-5	22
8	Brooklands Manchester University	18	5	3	10	31	54	-23	18
9	Canterbury	18	3	3	12	37	59	-22	12
10	Loughborough Students	18	0	1	17	18	63	-45	1

= Qualified for League finals weekend
= Relegated

=== Results ===
Home \ Away	Bee	Bro	Can	EG	HW	Hol	Lou	Rea	Sub	Wim
Beeston	—	0–0	5–2	2–0	1–0	2–3	2–0	4–2	1–4	2–3
Brooklands MU	2–3	—	2–1	0–6	3–3	0–6	2–0	1–4	3–3	2–3
Canterbury	0–3	2–3	—	3–4	2–2	3–5	2–1	1–2	4–4	5–2
East Grinstead	2–1	3–1	4–1	—	2–3	4–1	5–1	2–2	2–2	2–4
Hampstead and Westminster	4–3	2–1	7–2	4–3	—	3–3	4–1	4–1	3–4	2–2
Holcombe	4–3	5–1	0–0	2–0	3–1	—	2–1	1–1	3–2	1–2
Loughborough Students	1–3	1–3	1–3	2–6	1–4	2–6	—	1–6	2–4	0–4
Reading	2–2	2–4	4–1	3–2	4–5	0–3	3–1	—	0–3	1–6
Surbiton	6–1	6–2	5–3	4–2	2–2	3–1	2–2	2–2	—	3–3
Wimbledon	2–2	4–1	5–2	5–3	2–1	2–1	2–0	2–1	3–3	—

Legend: Blue = home team win; Yellow = draw; Red = away team win.

== Women's Investec Premier Division League Standings ==
Pos	Team	P	W	D	L	GF	GA	GD	Pts
1	Surbiton	18	15	2	1	53	14	39	47
2	Holcombe	18	11	5	2	44	25	19	38
3	East Grinstead	18	9	6	3	32	20	12	33
4	University of Birmingham	18	10	2	6	38	35	3	32
5	Leicester	18	8	5	5	31	24	7	29
6	Clifton	18	9	1	8	42	31	11	28
7	Canterbury	18	5	5	8	25	38	-13	20
8	Slough	18	3	3	12	15	37	-22	12
9	Bowdon Hightown	18	1	5	12	18	44	-26	8
10	Reading	18	1	2	15	17	47	-30	5

= Qualified for League finals weekend
= Relegated

=== Results ===
Home \ Away	Bow	Can	Cli	EG	Hol	Lei	Rea	Slo	Sub	Bir
Bowdon Hightown	—	2–3	1–1	1–4	3–3	2–0	0–0	3–4	0–5	1–2
Canterbury	2–1	—	0–6	1–1	0–1	2–3	2–1	1–1	0–3	1–2
Clifton Robinsons	2–1	3–0	—	1–2	2–4	3–2	5–1	2–0	1–2	1–2
East Grinstead	0–0	0–0	3–1	—	2–3	2–2	2–0	1–0	0–2	1–2
Holcombe	1–0	1–1	4–2	0–1	—	1–1	4–0	4–1	2–2	3–1
Leicester	5–1	3–1	0–1	2–2	0–2	—	2–1	0–0	3–2	1–1
Reading	1–1	1–2	2–3	2–4	2–5	0–3	—	1–3	0–1	2–3
Slough	1–0	1–4	1–4	1–2	2–2	0–3	0–1	—	0–2	0–4
Surbiton	6–0	4–1	4–3	1–1	4–1	3–0	1–0	2–0	—	3–2
University of Birmingham	4–1	4–4	2–1	1–4	1–3	0–1	6–2	1–0	0–6	—

Legend: Blue = home team win; Yellow = draw; Red = away team win.

== League Finals Weekend ==
- Held at the Lee Valley Hockey and Tennis Centre

=== Semi-finals ===
Division	Team 1	Team 2	Score
Men's Premier	Wimbledon	Hampstead and Westminster	2-1
Men's Premier	Holcombe	Surbiton	2-3
Women's Premier	Surbiton	University of Birmingham	3-1
Women's Premier	Holcombe	East Grinstead	2-1

=== 3rd/4th Playoff ===
Due to Wimbledon's finishing fourth in the 2016–17 Euro Hockey League a third team from England is allowed to join the competition meaning a 3rd/4th playoff is necessary.

Division	Team 1	Team 2	Score
Men's Premier	Hampstead and Westminster	Holcombe	3-7

=== Finals ===
Men

Team 1	Team 2	Score	Scorers	Ref
Surbiton	Wimbledon	3-3 (3-2 p)	Ball, Weir, Mantell/Forsyth, Furlong (2)	

Squads
Surbiton
Harry Gibson (gk), Taylor Seager-Green (gk), Brendan Creed, Lewis Prosser (capt), Rob Farrington, David Goodfield, Jonny Gall, David Beckett, William Marshall, Zach Wallace, Gareth Furlong, Arjan Drayton-Chana, Richard Hildreth, Alan Forsyth, David Bartram, Morgan Males, Nick Parkes, Luke Noblett, Coach: Mark Pearn

Wimbledon
James Bailey (gk), Oliver Meyer-Bothling (gk), Ben Arnold, Peter Friend, Henry Weir, Chad Conlon, Ian Sloan, Simon Mantell, Steve Ebbers, Phil Roper, Michael Hoare, Phil Ball, Chris Gregg, Borja LLorens, Nathanael Stewart, Ben Tibble, Gordon McIntyre, Johnny Kinder (capt), Coach: Ben Hawes

Women

Team 1	Team 2	Score
Surbiton	Holcombe	3-1

== Men's Cup ==
=== Quarter-finals ===
Team 1	Team 2	Score
Beeston	Reading	1-3
Havant	Bromley and Beckenham	0-2
Bowdon	Canterbury	2-5
Brooklands Manchester University	Oxford Hawks	3-1

=== Semi-finals ===
Team 1	Team 2	Score
Bromley and Beckenham	Canterbury	0-2
Reading	Brooklands Manchester University	4-2

=== Final ===
(Held at the Lee Valley Hockey & Tennis Centre on 29 April)

Team 1	Team 2	Score
Reading	Canterbury	6-1

Squads

Reading
Tommy Alexander (gk), Ciaran O'Connell, Richard Mantell, Montgomery Jefferson, Ben Boon, Edward Carson, Dan Shingles (capt), James Carson, Jonty Clarke, Andy Watts, Tim Atkins, Rhys Doherty, Imre Gerrits, Nick Park, Ajai Dhadwal, Jonny Gooch, Coach: Andy Watts

Canterbury
Diccon Stubbings (gk), Kris Glass, Bill Cain, Tom Bean, Jack Balsdon, Chris Laslett. Matt Burton-Bowen, Sam George, Craig Boyne (capt), Sam Barrett, Hamish Roberts, Edward Welch, Andrew Dunn, Sean Gilmore, Will Heywood, Max Liebenshutz-Jones, Coach: David Mathews

== Women's Cup ==
Quarterfinals
Clifton	4
Ben Rhydding	1
Beeston	5
Sevenoaks	1
Slough	1
Surbiton	6
Bowdon Hightown	2
Barnes	1

Semi-finals
Clifton	2
Beeston	1
Surbiton	5
Bowdon Hightown	0

Final
30 April 2017
Clifton	0
Surbiton	5

=== Final ===
30 April 2017
13:00

Clifton	0–5	Surbiton
	Report	Ansley 16', 52'; Atkinson 22'; Pearne-Webb 34'; Martin 68'

Lee Valley Hockey and Tennis Centre
Umpires:
Emma Shelbourn (ENG)
Rachel Williams (ENG)

== Promotion Tournaments ==
The winners of the 3 regional conferences and the second to bottom placed team in Premier League play a Promotion Tournament with the top 2 placed teams playing in the Premier League next season while the bottom 2 play in the conference leagues.

=== Men's competition ===
Pos	Team	Pld	W	D	L	GF	GA	GD	Pts	Promotion
1	Canterbury	3	2	1	0	13	6	+7	7	Promoted to Premier League
2	Sevenoaks	3	2	0	1	9	11	−2	6	Promoted to Premier League
3	Team Bath Buccaneers	3	0	2	1	7	8	−1	2	
4	Durham University	3	0	1	2	6	10	−4	1	

Source: EnglandHockey
Rules for classification: 1) points; 2) goal difference; 3) goals scored; 4) head-to-head result.

9 April 2017
13:15

Sevenoaks	3–2	Team Bath Buccaneers
Torry 6'; Parnis 16'; Ross 35'	Report	Scott 23'; Boote 38'

Nottingham Hockey Centre
Umpires:
Daniel Barstow (ENG)
Nicholas Bennett (ENG)

9 April 2017
15:30

Canterbury	4–1	Durham University
Roberts 34'; Oates 34'; Pollard 53'; Heywood 57'	Report	Stubbings 18'

Nottingham Hockey Centre
Umpires:
Matthew Harrison (ENG)
Nicholas White (ENG)

22 April 2017
14:00

Canterbury	2–2	Team Bath Buccaneers
Roberts 16', 68'	Report	Jackson 41'; Stone 44'

Lee Valley Hockey and Tennis Centre
Umpires:
Martin Twist (ENG)
Nicholas White (ENG)

22 April 2017
16:00

Durham University	2–3	Sevenoaks
Stubbings 21'; Graham 49'	Report	Parnis 44'; Ross 63'; Smith 69'

Lee Valley Hockey and Tennis Centre
Umpires:
Nicholas Padget (ENG)
Nicholas Bennett (ENG)

23 April 2017
11:30

Sevenoaks	3–7	Canterbury
Barker 34'; Parnis 47', 62'	Report	Barrett 21'; Heywood 31'; Bean 35', 45', 66'; Oates 56'; Roberts 58'

Lee Valley Hockey and Tennis Centre
Umpires:
Sean Edwards (ENG)
Nicholas Padget (ENG)

23 April 2017
11:30

Team Bath Buccaneers	3–3	Durham University
Hewer 4'; Skinner 40'; Stone 48'	Report	Patterson 22'; Suleman 50', 51'

Lee Valley Hockey and Tennis Centre
Umpires:
Lee Barron (ENG)
Nicholas White (ENG)

=== Women's competition ===
Pos	Team	Pld	W	D	L	GF	GA	GD	Pts	Promotion
1	Bowdon Hightown	3	2	1	0	7	5	+2	7	Promoted to Premier League
2	Buckingham	3	2	0	1	6	5	+1	6	Promoted to Premier League
3	Wimbledon	3	1	0	2	7	8	−1	3	
4	Brooklands Poynton	3	0	1	2	3	5	−2	1	

Source: EnglandHockey
Rules for classification: 1) points; 2) goal difference; 3) goals scored; 4) head-to-head result.

9 April 2017
13:15

Bowdon Hightown	2–1	Buckingham
Mason 14'; Wray 47'	Report	Freshwater 48'

Nottingham Hockey Centre
Umpires:
Robert Jenkins (ENG)
Caroline Frye (ENG)

9 April 2017
15:30

Brooklands Poynton	1–2	Wimbledon
Harris 31'	Report	Cullen 20'; Winter 51'

Nottingham Hockey Centre
Umpires:
Catherine Wright (ENG)
David Howell (ENG)

22 April 2017
10:00

Buckingham	1–0	Brooklands Poynton
Nicholson 60'	Report

Lee Valley Hockey and Tennis Centre
Umpires:
Gemma Jones (ENG)
Helen Sargeant (ENG)

22 April 2017
12:00

Wimbledon	2–3	Bowdon Hightown
Cullen 22'; Naylor 67'	Report	Liptrot 19'; Mason 25'; Wray 38'

Lee Valley Hockey and Tennis Centre
Umpires:
David Howell (ENG)
Gillian Lord (ENG)

23 April 2017
09:30

Wimbledon	3–4	Buckingham
Sherriff 7', 19'; Cullen 70'	Report	Higgins 4', 50'; James 13'; Shipperley 45'

Lee Valley Hockey and Tennis Centre
Umpires:
Caroline Frye (ENG)
Catherine Wright (ENG)

23 April 2017
09:30

Brooklands Poynton	2–2	Bowdon Hightown
Hughes 23'; Wallace 58'	Report	Garbutt 26', 69'

Lee Valley Hockey and Tennis Centre
Umpires:
Gillian Lord (ENG)
David Howell (ENG)
