= 2016–17 Investec Women's Hockey Premier Division season =

- Dates: September 2016 – April 2017
- Champions: Surbiton
- Promoted: Buckingham
- Relegated: Reading
- Top goalscorer: Giselle Ansley (15)

The 2016–17 Investec Women's Hockey Premier Division season took place between September 2016 and April 2017. Surbiton won the title for the fourth consecutive season. They won both the regular season and the League Finals Weekend. Reading were relegated to the Conferences.

== Regular season ==
=== Final table ===
Pos	Team	P	W	D	L	GD	Pts
1	Surbiton	18	15	2	1	39	47
2	Holcombe	18	11	5	2	19	38
3	East Grinstead	18	9	6	3	12	33
4	University of Birmingham	18	10	2	6	3	32
5	Leicester	18	8	5	5	7	29
6	Clifton	18	9	1	8	11	28
7	Canterbury	18	5	5	8	-13	20
8	Slough	18	3	3	12	-22	12
9	Bowdon Hightown	18	1	5	12	-26	8
10	Reading	18	1	2	15	-30	5

= Qualified for League Finals Weekend
= Premier Division play-off
= Relegated to Conferences

=== Results ===
Home \ Away	Bow	Can	Cli	EG	Hol	Lei	Rea	Slo	Sub	Bir
Bowdon Hightown	—	2–3	1–1	1–4	3–3	2–0	0–0	3–4	0–5	1–2
Canterbury	2–1	—	0–6	1–1	0–1	2–3	2–1	1–1	0–3	1–2
Clifton Robinsons	2–1	3–0	—	1–2	2–4	3–2	5–1	2–0	1–2	1–2
East Grinstead	0–0	0–0	3–1	—	2–3	2–2	2–0	1–0	0–2	1–2
Holcombe	1–0	1–1	4–2	0–1	—	1–1	4–0	4–1	2–2	3–1
Leicester	5–1	3–1	0–1	2–2	0–2	—	2–1	0–0	3–2	1–1
Reading	1–1	1–2	2–3	2–4	2–5	0–3	—	1–3	0–1	2–3
Slough	1–0	1–4	1–4	1–2	2–2	0–3	0–1	—	0–2	0–4
Surbiton	6–0	4–1	4–3	1–1	4–1	3–0	1–0	2–0	—	3–2
University of Birmingham	4–1	4–4	2–1	1–4	1–3	0–1	6–2	1–0	0–6	—

Legend: Blue = home team win; Yellow = draw; Red = away team win.

== League Finals Weekend ==
=== Semi-finals ===
22 April 2017

Surbiton	3–1	University of Birmingham
Ansley 13'; Middleton 24'; Martin 43'		Sanders 21'

Lee Valley
Umpires:
Emma Shelbourn
Cathy Wright

22 April 2017

Holcombe	2–1	East Grinstead
Beeney 40'; Wilkinson 41'		Blackwood 7'

Lee Valley

=== Final ===
23 April 2017
16.00

Surbiton	3–1	Holcombe
Ansley 26'; Middleton 32'; Evans 52'		Watton 40'

Lee Valley
Umpires:
Hannah Harrison
Emma Shelbourn

== Premier Division play-off ==
The winners of the three regional conferences and the ninth placed team in Premier Division played a round-robin tournament. The top two placed teams will play in the 2017–18 Premier Division while the bottom two will play in the Conferences. Bowdon Hightown won the group to keep their place in the Premier Division while Buckingham beat Wimbledon and Brooklands Poynton to secure promotion. Buckingham were promoted after a 4–3 win over Wimbledon in a winner-takes-all encounter.

Pos	Team	P	W	D	L	GD	Pts
1	Bowdon Hightown	3	2	1	0	2	7
2	Buckingham	3	2	0	1	1	6
3	Wimbledon	3	1	0	2	-1	3
4	Brooklands Poynton	3	0	1	2	-2	1

= Qualified for the 2017–18 Premier Division
