= 2018–19 Women's England Hockey League season =

English field hockey season

The 2018–19 Women's England Hockey League season or Investec Hockey League (for sponsorship reasons) was the 2018–19 season of England's field hockey league structure. The regular season started on 22 September 2018 until 30 March 2019, with a winter break in December and January for the Indoor season. The playoffs took place on 13 and 14 April.

Holcombe topped the regular season table but Surbiton sealed the Championship after winning the playoffs. Clifton Robinsons won the season ending Cup competition.

== Premier League ==
=== Standings ===
Pos	Team	Pld	W	D	L	GF	GA	GD	Pts	Qualification
1	Holcombe	18	13	2	3	39	17	+22	41	Qualified for Semi–finals
2	Surbiton	18	12	2	4	37	12	+25	38	Qualified for Semi–finals
3	East Grinstead	18	12	1	5	39	18	+21	37	Qualified for Semi–finals
4	Buckingham	18	9	2	7	33	28	+5	29	Qualified for Semi–finals
5	Clifton Robinsons	18	7	2	9	30	31	−1	23	
6	Beeston	18	6	4	8	24	35	−11	22	
7	Bowdon Hightown	18	5	5	8	22	36	−14	20	
8	University of Birmingham	18	4	7	7	29	38	−9	19	
9	Slough	18	2	8	8	17	31	−14	14	Advance to Play–offs
10	Canterbury	18	1	5	12	15	39	−24	8	Relegated to Promotion League

Source: England Hockey
Rules for classification: 1) Points; 2) Goal difference; 3) Goals scored; 4) Games won; 5) Head-to-head.

=== Play–offs ===
==== Standings ====
Pos	Team	Pld	W	D	L	GF	GA	GD	Pts	Promotion
1	Hampstead & Westminster	3	2	0	1	9	3	+6	6	Promoted to 2019–20 Premier League
2	Loughborough Students	3	2	0	1	8	2	+6	6	Promoted to 2019–20 Premier League
3	Slough	3	2	0	1	7	5	+2	6	
4	Stourport	3	0	0	3	3	17	−14	0	

Source: England Hockey
Rules for classification: 1) Points; 2) Goal difference; 3) Goals scored; 4) Games won; 5) Head-to-head.

==== Fixtures ====
7 April 2019
13:15

Hampstead & Westminster	1–2	Slough
Askew 38'	Report	Totten 44'; Newton 69'

Nottingham Hockey Centre, Nottingham
Umpires:
Gillian Lord (ENG)
Robert Jenkins (ENG)

7 April 2019
15:30

Stourport	1–5	Loughborough Students
Parkinson-Mills 23'	Report	Grieve 10', 50'; Park 15'; Byrne 37'; Millington 40'

Nottingham Hockey Centre, Nottingham
Umpires:
Caroline Frye (ENG)
David Howell (ENG)

13 April 2019
14:00

Slough	5–1	Stourport
Wood 29'; Newton 55'; Brown 579'; Totten 59'; O'Nien 68'	Report	Merriman 42'

Lee Valley Hockey and Tennis Centre, London
Umpires:
Caroline Frye (ENG)
Gillian Lord (ENG)

13 April 2019
16:00

Loughborough Students	0–1	Hampstead & Westminster
	Report	Hyams 67'

Lee Valley Hockey and Tennis Centre, London
Umpires:
David Howell (ENG)
Robert Jenkins (ENG)

14 April 2019
11:30

Hampstead & Westminster	7–1	Stourport
Wilkinson 9', 20'; Clark 26'; Maguire 38', 49'; Turner 60'; McCaw 70'	Report	MacKenzie 35'

Lee Valley Hockey and Tennis Centre, London
Umpires:
Gillian Lord (ENG)
Catherine Wright (ENG)

14 April 2019
11:30

Loughborough Students	3–0	Slough
Park 31'; Millington 46'; Grieve 60'	Report

Lee Valley Hockey and Tennis Centre, London
Umpires:
Lelia Sacre (CAN)
Caroline Frye (ENG)

=== Classification round ===
Semi-finals
13 April 2019
Holcombe	6
Buckingham	0
13 April 2019
Surbiton	4
East Grinstead	1

Final
14 April 2019
Holcombe	0
Surbiton	1

==== Semi-finals ====
13 April 2019
15:30

Holcombe	6–0	Buckingham
Manuel 12'; Chamberlain 44'; Viarengo 45'; Lewis 45'; Wilkinson 54'; McEwan 57'	Report

Lee Valley Hockey and Tennis Centre, London
Umpires:
Catherine Wright (ENG)
Emma Shelbourn (ENG)

13 April 2019
17:45

Surbiton	4–1	East Grinstead
Petter 21', 55'; Sanders 24', 53'	Report	Bray 42'

Lee Valley Hockey and Tennis Centre, London
Umpires:
Hannah Harrison (ENG)
Lelia Sacre (CAN)

==== Final ====
14 April 2019
16:00

Holcombe	0–1	Surbiton
	Report	Ansley 24'

Lee Valley Hockey and Tennis Centre, London
Umpires:
Emma Shelbourn (ENG)
Hannah Harrison (ENG)

== Women's Championship Cup ==
=== Quarter-finals ===
Team 1	Team 2	Score
Ben Rhydding	University of Nottingham	2-0
Stourport	Clifton Robinsons	1-2
Sevenoaks	Hampstead & Westminster	1-2
Buckingham	Beeston	3-2

=== Semi-finals ===
Team 1	Team 2	Score
Buckingham	Clifton Robinsons	2-3
Ben Rhydding	Hampstead & Westminster	1-4

=== Final ===
Team 1	Team 2	Score
Clifton Robinsons	Hampstead & Westminster	2-2 (3-1p)

== See also ==
2018–19 Men's Hockey League season
