= 2021–22 Women's England Hockey League season =

Women's England Hockey League

The 2021–22 Women's England Hockey League season (sponsored by Vitality) is the 2021–22 season of England's field hockey league structure and England Hockey Women's Championship Cup. The 2021–22 season returned to normality following two seasons of disruption caused by the COVID-19 pandemic in the United Kingdom. The 2021–22 Premier Division saw the same teams competing from the following season, which had been cancelled. Therefore Surbiton were the defending champions, having won the league during the 2019–20 season.

The season started on 18 September 2021, with the Premier Division using a new system of two phases. The first phase would consist of 10 matches per club and would be completed by the end of 2021, determining the top six clubs (irrespective of home and away advantage) for phase 2. The other divisions would use the traditional format (home and away against each team).

The season ended without playoffs because of the new format and Surbiton effectively defended their title successfully because the previous season had been wiped out. It was Surbiton's eighth consecutive title.

Beeston finished fifth in the league standings but won the 2022 England Hockey Women's Championship Cup.

== Final tables ==
=== Premier Division ===
Pos	Team	P	W	L	D	GF	GA	Pts	Section
1	Surbiton	20	14	5	1	53	20	47	top 6
2	Hampstead & Westminster	20	13	1	1	46	31	40	
3	Wimbledon	20	12	3	5	52	20	39	
4	East Grinstead	20	12	0	8	50	33	36	
5	Beeston	20	8	3	9	35	44	27	
6	Clifton Robinsons	20	4	5	11	30	57	17	
7	University of Birmingham	18	7	6	5	31	30	27	bottom 5
8	Buckingham	18	7	4	7	28	32	25	
9	Holcombe	18	5	4	9	27	32	19	
10	Loughborough Students	18	4	1	13	26	51	13	
11	Swansea	18	2	2	14	15	43	8	relegated

=== Division One South ===
Pos	Team	P	W	L	D	GF	GA	Pts
1	Reading	18	13	4	1	47	12	43
2	Sevenoaks	18	11	4	3	43	20	37
3	Slough	18	11	3	4	30	16	36
4	Surbiton 2nd XI	18	8	4	6	36	25	28
5	Isca & University of Exeter	18	8	4	6	33	29	28
6	Canterbury	18	8	3	7	30	33	27
7	Wimbledon 2nd XI	18	4	4	10	19	34	16
8	Cambridge City	18	3	4	11	19	33	13
9	Harleston Magpies	18	3	4	11	22	45	13
10	Trojans	18	3	2	13	19	51	11 (R)

=== Division One North ===
Pos	Team	P	W	L	D	GF	GA	Pts
1	University of Nottingham	18	17	1	0	93	17	52
2	Bowdon Hightown	18	15	1	2	54	19	46
3	Durham University	18	13	1	4	50	24	40
4	Stourport	18	11	0	7	48	33	33
5	Leicester City	18	9	2	7	34	34	29
6	Brooklands Poynton	18	5	4	9	27	43	19
7	Ben Rhydding	18	5	4	9	22	40	19
8	Gloucester City	18	3	3	12	21	44	12
9	Olton & West Warwicks	18	1	3	14	13	59	6 (R)
10	Belper	18	0	3	15	11	60	3 (R)

== England Hockey Women's Championship Cup ==
=== Quarter-finals ===
Date	Team 1	Team 2	Score
10 Apr	Beeston	Stourport	3–1
10 Apr	Surbiton 2nd XI	Clifton Robinsons	1–3
10 Apr	Timperley	Bowdon	1–1 (3–2p)
10 Apr	London Wayfarers	Buckingham	1–2

=== Semi-finals ===
Date	Team 1	Team 2	Score
24 Apr	Timperley	Buckingham	0–5
30 Apr	Clifton Robinsons	Beeston	1–3

=== Final ===
- Lee Valley Hockey and Tennis Centre

Date	Team 1	Team 2	Score	Scorers
28 May	Beeston	Buckingham	3–1	Grieve, Millington, Burrell / Thomas

Beeston
Steph Tirrell (gk), Julie Whiting, Ella Cusack, Alice Huddlestone, Lauren Burrell (capt), Hannah Grieve, Maddie Pendle, Charlotte Summers, Sophie Robinson, Lucy Millington, Paige Gillott; reps: Cerys Miller, Ruby Apoola, Beatrice Bell, Madeleine Newitt, Nadia Benallal; coach: James Sordillo; manager: Zoe Hainsworth.
Buckingham
Nicole Marks (gk), Megan Lewis-Williams, Emma O'Nien, Lottie Porter (capt), Maddy Newlyn, Lauren Thomas, Kirsty Freshwater, Natasha James, Tilly Crampsie, Rebecca van Arrowsmith, Olivia Strickland; reps: Georgina Black, Alex Naughalty, Cassidy Jorritsma, Deborah James; manager: Kate Porter.

== See also ==
2021–22 Men's England Hockey League season
