= 2017–18 Men's England Hockey League season =

English field hockey season

The 2017–18 Men's England Hockey League season ran from 23 September 2017 until 25 March 2018 with a winter break in December and January for the Indoor season.

Locations of the 2017–18 Men's Hockey League teams

== Structure ==
The League consists of 4 different competitions with 10 teams in each competition. The leaders, at the end of the season, from the Premier League compete in a Champions Tournament, whilst the 10th placed top flight team gets relegated and the 9th placed team competes for their place with the winners of the regional conferences.

Premier Division	Conference East	Conference North	Conference West
Beeston	Brighton & Hove	Bowdon	Cardiff & Met
Brooklands MU	Cambridge City	Cannock	Cheltenham
Canterbury	Chichester	Deeside Ramblers	Clifton Robinsons
East Grinstead	Old Georgians	Doncaster	Fareham
Hampstead & Westminster	Old Loughtonians	Leeds	Havant
Holcombe	Oxted	Loughborough Students	Isca
Reading	Richmond	Preston	Olton & West Warwickshire
Sevenoaks	Southgate	Sheffield Hallam	Team Bath Buccaneers
Surbiton	Teddington	University of Durham	University of Birmingham
Wimbledon	West Herts	University of Nottingham	University of Exeter

== Premier League ==
Team	Stadium	City/Area	Previous season
Beeston	Nottingham Hockey Centre	Beeston, Nottingham	5th
Brooklands MU	'The Firs' Manchester Univ Playing Fields	Manchester	8th
Canterbury	Polo Farm	Canterbury, Kent	9th
East Grinstead	East Grinstead Sports Club	East Grinstead, West Sussex	6th
Hampstead & Westminster	Paddington Recreation Ground	London	4th
Holcombe	Holcombe Park	Gillingham, Medway	2nd
Reading	Sonning Lane	Reading, Berkshire	7th
Sevenoaks	Hollybush Lane	Sevenoaks, Kent	Promoted from East Conference
Surbiton	Sugden Road	Surbiton, Kingston upon Thames	3rd
Wimbledon	King's College School	Wimbledon	1st

2017-18 Greater London Men's Hockey League clubs

== Final standings ==
=== Premier League ===
Pos	Team	P	W	D	L	GF	GA	GD	Pts
1	Wimbledon	18	12	3	3	50	24	26	39
2	Surbiton	18	12	2	4	69	41	28	38
3	Beeston	18	12	1	5	55	34	21	37
4	Hampstead and Westminster	18	11	2	5	63	37	26	35
5	Reading	18	11	0	7	61	36	25	33
6	East Grinstead	18	9	1	8	51	50	1	28
7	Holcombe	18	8	2	8	48	40	8	26
8	Brooklands Manchester University	18	5	2	11	45	52	-7	17
9	Sevenoaks	18	1	2	15	29	83	-54	5
10	Canterbury	18	1	1	16	20	94	-74	4

= Qualified for League finals weekend
= Playoff Position
= Relegated

==== Results ====
Home \ Away	Bee	Bro	Can	EG	HW	Hol	Rea	Sev	Sub	Wim
Beeston	—	1–4	6–3	5–2	4–2	2–0	3–1	3–1	2–5	1–1
Brooklands Manchester University	0–3	—	6–0	4–3	3–5	2–2	2–3	8–4	3–3	1–3
Canterbury	0–5	1–4	—	1–5	3–5	1–5	0–5	3–2	2–6	1–7
East Grinstead	2–5	2–1	6–1	—	1–0	5–1	3–7	6–1	2–3	3–1
Hampstead & Westminster	3–2	4–0	7–0	2–2	—	3–2	2–1	6–1	5–4	1–3
Holcombe	0–2	3–0	8–0	2–3	3–2	—	3–4	3–2	4–2	0–1
Reading	1–2	5–4	5–0	6–1	2–3	1–2	—	6–0	3–1	3–2
Sevenoaks	2–4	3–1	3–3	1–3	2–10	3–3	1–4	—	1–3	0–4
Surbiton	5–4	5–1	7–0	5–1	2–1	3–4	5–3	6–2	—	2–2
Wimbledon	2–1	2–1	2–1	4–1	2–2	4–3	2–1	7–0	1–2	—

Legend: Blue = home team win; Yellow = draw; Red = away team win.

== League Finals Weekend ==
=== Semi-finals ===
Date	Team 1	Team 2	Score
Apr 28	Wimbledon	Hampstead and Westminster	1-2
Apr 28	Surbiton	Beeston	2-1

=== Final ===
Date	Team 1	Team 2	Score
Apr 29	Surbiton	Hampstead and Westminster	3-3 (3-2 pens)

=== Final details ===
- Surbiton
- Scorers: Alan Forsyth 14-F, 16-PS, Gareth Furlong 58-PC / Shootout Scorers: Forsyth 2, Goodfield
- Squad: Harry Gibson (GK); Luke Taylor, Luke Noblett, Jonny Gall, Chris Grassick (Capt.), Arjan Drayton Chana, Zachary Wallace, Alan Forsyth, Brendan Creed, David Goodfield, James Gall. Subs: Sam Spencer, Lewis Prosser, Gareth Furlong, Rob Farrington, Nicky Parkes, Scott Evans. not used: Taylor Seager-Green (GK)
- Hampstead & W
- Scorers: Chris Cargo (PC22), Will Calnan (FG28), Matt Guise Brown (PC42) / Shootout Scorers: Calnan, Martin
- Squad: Jamie Legg (gk), Richard Smith, Geoff McCabe, Marc Edwards, Toby Roche (c), Michael Watt, Sam French, Matt Guise-Brown, Harry Martin, Kwan Browne, Will Calnan. Subs: Steve Kelly, Chris Cargo, Rupert Shipperley, Will Byas, Stephen Dowds, Joe Crame. not used: George Ratcliffe (GK)

== East Conference ==
Conference East
Brighton & Hove
Cambridge City
Chichester
Old Georgians
Old Loughtonians
Oxted
Richmond
Southgate
Teddington
West Herts

== West Conference ==
Conference West
Cardiff & Met
Cheltenham
Clifton Robinsons
Fareham
Havant
Isca
Olton & West Warwickshire
Team Bath Buccaneers
University of Birmingham
University of Exeter

== North Conference ==
Conference North
Bowdon
Cannock
Deeside Ramblers
Doncaster
Leeds
Loughborough Students
Preston
Sheffield Hallam
University of Durham
University of Nottingham

== EH Men's Championship Cup ==
=== Quarter-finals ===
Team 1	Team 2	Score
Beeston	University of Birmingham	5-3
Reading	Fareham	7-1
Bowdon	Sheffield Hallam	4-1
Old Loughtonians	Oxted	5-1

=== Semi-finals ===
Team 1	Team 2	Score
Beeston	Bowdon	2-1
Reading	Oxted	3-2

=== Final ===
(Held at the Lee Valley Hockey and Tennis Centre on 7 May)

Team 1	Team 2	Score	Scorers
Reading	Beeston	2-2 (4-2 pens)	Morton, Boon / Hibell, R Lawrence

Reading
Tommy Alexander, Daniel Kyriakides, Adam Miller, Richard Mantell, Ben Boon, Edward Carson, Dan Shingles, Ben Francis, Dale Hutchinson, Tim Atkins, James Royce, Nick Park, Owain Dolan-Gray, Lee Morton, Tom Carson, Stuart Loughrey, James Carson, Ciaran O'Connell
Beeston
Elliot Hibell, Simon Hujwan, Mark Wadsley, Kyle Marshall, Robbie Gleeson, Gareth Griffiths, Joe Sharp, Gareth Andrew, Lucas Garcia Alcalde, Stephen Lawrence, Richard Lawrence, Marius Gemmel, Chris Proctor, Matthew Crookshank, Simon Claris, Navraj Degun

== See also ==
- 2017–18 Investec Women's Hockey Premier Division season
