= 2018–19 Men's Hockey League season =

2018–19 Men's England Hockey League season

The 2018–19 Men's England Hockey League season was the 2018–19 season of England's field hockey league structure. The season started on 22 September 2018 until 14 April, with a winter break in December and January for the Indoor season.

Surbiton topped the regular season table but Hampstead and Westminster sealed the Championship after winning the playoffs. Bowdon Hockey Club won the season ending Cup competition.

== Final standings ==
=== Premier League ===
Pos	Team	P	W	D	L	GF	GA	GD	Pts
1	Surbiton	18	15	2	1	76	24	52	47
2	Hampstead and Westminster	18	13	2	3	47	21	26	41
3	Beeston	18	9	4	5	43	33	10	31
4	East Grinstead	18	8	3	7	35	35	0	27
5	Reading	18	8	3	7	37	44	-7	27
6	Holcombe	18	7	3	8	32	36	-4	24
7	Wimbledon	18	7	1	10	36	29	7	22
8	Brooklands Manchester University	18	6	4	8	42	50	-8	22
9	University of Exeter	18	3	3	12	25	53	-28	12
10	Sevenoaks	18	0	3	15	23	71	-48	3

= Qualified for League finals weekend
= Playoff Position
= Relegated

== League Finals Weekend ==
=== Semi-finals ===
Date	Team 1	Team 2	Score
Apr 13	Hampstead and Westminster	Beeston	2-1
Apr 13	Surbiton	East Grinstead	2-1

=== Final ===
(Held at Lee Valley)

Date	Team 1	Team 2	Score	Scorers
Apr 14	Hampstead and Westminster	Surbiton	3-1	Guise Brown (2), French / Sorsby

Hampstead
Toby Reynolds-Cotterill (gk), Steve Kelly, Richard Smith, Marc Edwards, Toby Roche (c), Rupert Shipperley, Paul Melkert, Samuel French, Matt Guise-Brown, Harry Martin, Kwan Browne; subs-Jonny Gooch, James Oates, Chris Cargo, Will Calnan, Rhodri Furlong, Kei Kaeppeler
Surbiton
Harry Gibson (gk), Luke Taylor, Ben Boon, Jonathan Gall (c), David Beckett, Zachary Wallace, James Royce, Alan Forsyth, Brendan Creed, David Goodfield, James Gall; subs-Tom Sorsby, Lewis Prosser, Arjan Drayton Chana, Hayden Beltz, Sam Spencer, Nicky Parkes

== England Hockey Men's Championship Cup ==
=== Quarter-finals ===
Team 1	Team 2	Score
Canterbury	Old Cranleighans	6-0
City of Peterborough	Oxford Hawks	5-4
Bowdon	Leeds	3-1
Chichester	Cheltenham	1-3

=== Semi-finals ===
Team 1	Team 2	Score
Cheltenham	Canterbury	0-6
City of Peterborough	Bowdon	2-5

=== Final ===
(held at Lee Valley)

Team 1	Team 2	Score	Scorers
Bowdon	Canterbury	4-3	B White (3), E White / Vaughan, Bean, Carney

Bowdon
James Mazarelo (gk), Oliver Stoddart, Daniel Campbell, Samuel Cooke, Hugh Wickert, Richie Dawson-Smith, David Egerton, Thomas Ainsworth, William Tobin, Matt Steventon, Archie Phillips, Lee Parry, Sam Apoola, James Vallely, Ben White, Elliot White.
Canterbury
Nathan Redman (gk), Joshua Izzard, James Henderson, Tom Bean, Toby Vaughan, Jack Balsdon, Louis Ridge, William Mead, Craig Boyne, Matt Burton-Bowen, William Heywood, Teague Marcano, Thomas Degiovanni, Matthew Carney, Adam Lee-Browne, Patrick Brookson.

== See also ==
2018–19 Women's England Hockey League season
