= 2012–13 England Hockey League season =

English field hockey season

2012–13 England Hockey League

The 2012–13 English Hockey League season took place from September 2012 until April 2013. The end of season playoffs were held on the 13 & 14 April for the men and the 20 & 21 April for the women. The Men's Championship was won by Beeston and the Women's Championship was won by Reading.

The Men's Cup was won by Surbiton and the Women's Cup was won by Bowdon Hightown.

== Men's Premier Division League Standings ==
Pos	Team	P	W	D	L	F	A	GD	Pts
1	Beeston	18	14	1	3	82	38	44	43
2	Surbiton	18	9	5	4	54	39	15	32
3	Canterbury	18	10	0	8	59	57	2	30
4	Reading	18	8	5	5	56	46	10	29
5	East Grinstead	18	9	2	7	51	48	3	29
6	Cannock	18	7	3	8	47	53	-6	24
7	Hampstead and Westminster	18	6	4	8	30	48	-18	22
8	Loughborough Students	18	5	5	8	55	65	-10	20
9	Southgate	18	4	2	12	40	53	-13	14
10	Brooklands Manchester University	18	4	1	13	34	61	-27	13

= Qualified for Play Offs
= Relegated

=== Results ===
Home \ Away	Bee	Bro	Can	Can	EG	HW	Lou	Rea	Sou	Sub
Beeston	—	5–3	5–1	7–1	3–2	1–1	7–4	4–1	6–0	7–2
Brooklands MU	3–2	—	1–3	3–5	2–5	1–3	3–2	3–2	2–4	2–3
Cannock	2–8	1–1	—	2–3	3–5	1–2	5–3	1–1	5–4	2–2
Canterbury	5–7	4–2	2–6	—	2–3	6–1	6–0	1–8	3–2	2–3
East Grinstead	1–6	1–3	3–2	2–4	—	1–0	4–5	0–3	3–1	4–3
Hampstead and Westminster	1–5	2–1	0–4	0–3	1–1	—	3–2	3–7	2–4	2–2
Loughborough Students	3–5	5–2	3–4	6–5	3–3	2–3	—	6–6	2–2	2–2
Reading	2–1	3–1	2–1	2–4	4–5	3–3	2–2	—	3–2	2–5
Southgate	1–2	7–0	2–3	2–1	0–6	1–2	2–3	2–3	—	4–4
Surbiton	5–1	4–1	6–1	1–2	3–2	3–1	1–2	2–2	3–0	—

Legend: Blue = home team win; Yellow = draw; Red = away team win.

== Women's Investec Premier Division League Standings ==
Pos	Team	P	W	D	L	F	A	Pts
1	Leicester	18	13	3	2	50	16	42
2	Canterbury	18	12	4	2	57	28	40
3	Reading	18	11	3	4	50	30	36
4	Surbiton	18	10	4	4	39	24	34
5	Bowdon Hightown	18	9	4	5	43	32	31
6	Clifton	18	6	6	6	43	43	24
7	Sutton Coldfield	18	7	1	10	54	55	22
8	University of Birmingham	18	3	2	13	26	51	11
9	Olton & West Warwicks	18	3	0	13	25	54	11
10	Slough	18	1	1	16	18	72	4

= Qualified for Play Offs
= Relegated

== Play Offs ==
=== Semi-finals ===
Division	Team 1	Team 2	Score
Men's Premier	Surbiton	Canterbury	5-3
Men's Premier	Beeston	Reading	2-2 (4-3 p)
Women's Premier	Leicester	Surbiton	2-2 (3-2 p)
Women's Premier	Reading	Canterbury	5-1

=== Finals ===
Division	Team 1	Team 2	Score
Men's Premier	Beeston	Surbiton	5-1
Women's Premier	Reading	Leicester	1-1 (2-0 p)

== Men's Cup ==
=== Quarter-finals ===
Team 1	Team 2	Score
Hampstead & Westminster	Beeston	4-3
Oxted	Bromley & Beckenham	3-2
Surbiton	Sheffield University Bankers	4-1
Cannock	Doncaster	4-1

=== Semi-finals ===
Team 1	Team 2	Score
Surbiton	Oxted	6-1
Hampstead & Westminster	Cannock	2-2 (4-1 p)

=== Final ===
(Held at the Wakefield Hockey Club on 4 May)

Team 1	Team 2	Score
Surbiton	Hampstead & Westminster	3-1

== Women's Cup ==
=== Quarter-finals ===
Team 1	Team 2	Score
Clifton	Sevenoaks	5-1
Bowdon Hightown	Chelmsford	4-0
Buckingham	Wimbledon	4-1
Sutton Coldfield	Liverpool Sefton	3-2

=== Semi-finals ===
Team 1	Team 2	Score
Clifton	Sutton Coldfield	2-2 (3-1 p)
Bowdon Hightown	Buckingham	2-0

=== Final ===
(Held at Beeston Hockey Club on 27 April)

Team 1	Team 2	Score
Bowdon Hightown	Clifton	2-1
