= 2011–12 England Hockey League season =

English field hockey season

2011–12 England Hockey League

The 2011–12 English Hockey League season took place from September 2011 until April 2012. The women's league received sponsorship from Investec. The Men's Championship was won by Reading and the Women's Championship was won by Leicester.

The Men's Cup was won by Beeston and the Women's Cup was won by the University of Birmingham.

== Men's Premier Division League Standings ==
Pos	Team	Pld	W	D	L	GF	GA	GD	Pts	Qualification or relegation
1	East Grinstead	18	13	2	3	79	34	+45	41	Qualified for round two play off
2	Beeston	18	11	2	5	55	32	+23	35	Qualified for positional play off
3	Reading	18	9	4	5	42	32	+10	31	Qualified for positional play off
4	Cannock	18	9	3	6	36	30	+6	30	Qualified for round one play off
5	Surbiton	18	8	3	7	47	36	+11	27	Qualified for round one play off
6	Loughborough Students	18	7	2	9	33	43	−10	23	
7	Hampstead and Westminster	18	7	2	9	38	49	−11	23	
8	Southgate	18	5	3	10	22	43	−21	18	
9	University of Exeter	18	5	2	11	32	57	−25	17	Relegated
10	Bowdon	18	4	1	13	36	64	−28	13	Relegated

=== Results ===
Home \ Away	Bee	Bow	Can	EGr	H&W	Lou	Rea	Sou	Sub	UoE
Beeston	—	4–1	3–1	8–6	4–0	1–0	1–3	3–0	4–1	5–0
Bowdon	3–3	—	2–1	0–6	4–3	2–3	1–2	2–3	1–4	4–3
Cannock	2–2	3–2	—	4–2	2–1	1–2	1–1	4–0	1–3	4–1
East Grinstead	3–2	6–1	1–1	—	11–1	3–2	2–3	0–0	4–3	6–1
Hampstead and Westminster	3–2	4–3	0–2	3–4	—	4–0	2–2	3–3	2–1	3–1
Loughborough Students	1–2	4–2	4–1	1–7	2–1	—	1–1	1–1	1–4	5–2
Reading	2–1	7–1	0–1	1–8	0–1	0–2	—	6–0	2–2	4–2
Southgate	0–3	1–0	1–2	0–3	5–3	4–1	0–2	—	1–0	2–4
Surbiton	5–4	6–2	1–2	3–5	2–0	3–0	3–4	4–1	—	1–1
University of Exeter	1–3	1–5	4–3	0–2	1–4	4–3	3–2	2–0	1–1	—

Legend: Blue = home team win; Yellow = draw; Red = away team win.

== Play Offs ==
Match	Date	Team 1	Team 2	Score
Round one	Mar 31	Beeston	Cannock	5-3
Positional	Mar 31	Beeston	Reading	1-3
Round two	Apr 1	Beeston	Surbiton	3-2
Round two	Apr 1	East Grinstead	Reading	8-1
Round three	Apr 14	Reading	Beeston	5-1
Final	Apr 15	Reading	East Grinstead	5-4

== Women's Investec Premier Division League Standings ==
Pos	Team	Pld	W	D	L	GF	GA	GD	Pts	Qualification or relegation
1	Reading	18	14	2	2	69	17	+52	44	Qualified for round two play off
2	Leicester	18	12	3	3	42	20	+22	39	Qualified for positional play off
3	Canterbury	18	10	3	5	48	28	+20	33	Qualified for positional play off
4	Clifton	18	10	2	6	43	25	+18	32	Qualified for round one play off
5	Bowdon Hightown	18	7	4	7	42	35	+7	25	Qualified for round one play off
6	Olton & West Warwicks	18	7	2	9	43	49	−6	23	
7	University of Birmingham	18	6	4	8	39	39	0	22	
8	Sutton Coldfield	18	6	2	10	41	57	−16	20	
9	Slough	18	5	4	9	26	41	−15	19	
10	Cannock	18	0	0	18	10	92	−82	0	Relegated

== Play Offs ==
Match	Date	Team 1	Team 2	Score
Round one	Mar 31	Clifton	Bowdon Hightown	1-2
Positional	Mar 31	Leicester	Canterbury	4-1
Round two	Apr 1	Reading	Bowdon Hightown	2-0
Round three	Apr 14	Leicester	Canterbury	3-2
Final	Apr 15	Leicester	Reading	1-1 (3-2 p)

== Men's Cup ==
=== Quarter-finals ===
Team 1	Team 2	Score
Hampstead & Westminster	Canterbury	3-2
Bowdon	Southgate	4-1
Brooklands MU	Bromley & Beckenham	w/o
Beeston	Cannock	3-2

=== Semi-finals ===
Team 1	Team 2	Score
Hampstead & Westminster	Bowdon	5-4
Beeston	Brooklands MU	4-3

=== Final ===
(Held at the Cannock on 13 May)

Team 1	Team 2	Score
Beeston	Hampstead & Westminster	2-1

== Women's Cup ==
=== Quarter-finals ===
Team 1	Team 2	Score
Clifton	Chelmsford	4-0
Surbiton	Sevenoaks	3-0
Buckingham	Doncaster	7-1
Univ of Birmingham	Sutton Coldfield	4-3

=== Semi-finals ===
Team 1	Team 2	Score
Surbiton	Clifton	1-0
Univ of Birmingham	Buckingham	5-0

=== Final ===
(Held at Cannock on 13 May)

Team 1	Team 2	Score
University of Birmingham	Surbiton	4-1
