= 2013–14 England Hockey League season =

English field hockey season

2013–14 England Hockey League

The 2013–14 English Hockey League season took place from September 2013 until April 2014. The end of season playoffs were held on the 5 & 6 April for the men and the 12 & 13 of April for the women. The Men's Championship was won by Beeston and the Women's Championship was won by Surbiton.

The Men's Cup was won by Cannock and the Women's Cup was won by Surbiton.

== Men's Premier Division League Standings ==
Pos	Team	P	W	D	L	F	A	GD	Pts
1	East Grinstead	18	14	2	2	86	44	42	44
2	Beeston	18	14	2	2	56	33	23	44
3	Reading	18	12	3	3	65	34	31	39
4	Surbiton	18	10	4	4	70	41	29	34
5	Canterbury	18	7	2	9	58	66	-8	23
6	Wimbledon	18	7	2	9	38	46	-8	23
7	Hampstead and Westminster	18	7	0	11	35	68	-33	21
8	Cannock	18	3	2	13	44	58	-14	11
9	Sheffield Hallam	18	3	2	13	29	59	-30	11
10	Loughborough Students	18	3	1	14	30	62	-32	10

= Qualified for League finals weekend
= Relegated

=== Results ===
Home \ Away	Bee	Can	Can	EG	HW	Lou	Rea	She	Sub	Wim
Beeston	—	2–1	3–2	5–4	3–0	3–2	4–3	3–1	3–2	2–3
Cannock	0–1	—	6–4	2–3	8–3	3–2	3–4	2–2	4–6	0–2
Canterbury	2–2	6–5	—	1–9	3–4	4–1	4–5	4–0	5–1	3–2
East Grinstead	1–3	4–2	7–4	—	9–3	8–1	4–3	3–0	2–2	7–0
Hampstead and Westminster	3–6	3–2	2–1	2–3	—	4–1	0–5	3–1	0–2	3–2
Loughborough Students	1–4	3–1	4–4	1–2	2–1	—	1–2	1–3	0–5	1–2
Reading	2–2	5–2	3–1	4–4	11–1	4–2	—	2–0	5–3	1–2
Sheffield Hallam	2–5	2–2	3–4	3–5	0–2	4–3	0–3	—	1–3	1–2
Surbiton	3–2	4–1	6–1	5–6	5–1	8–2	1–1	8–1	—	2–2
Wimbledon	1–3	2–0	3–5	3–5	4–0	0–2	0–2	4–5	4–4	—

Legend: Blue = home team win; Yellow = draw; Red = away team win.

== Women's Investec Premier Division League Standings ==
Pos	Team	P	W	D	L	F	A	Pts
1	Canterbury	18	14	2	2	47	14	44
2	Reading	18	14	1	3	58	16	43
3	Surbiton	18	12	3	3	51	17	39
4	Clifton	18	9	5	4	38	25	31*
5	Leicester	18	9	3	6	34	20	30
6	Bowdon Hightown	18	8	3	7	26	33	27
7	Beeston	18	6	1	11	38	31	19
8	University of Birmingham	18	6	0	12	31	32	18
9	Sutton Coldfield	18	3	0	15	29	51	9
10	Olton & West Warwicks	18	0	0	18	9	122	0

= Qualified for League finals weekend
= Relegated

== Play Offs ==
=== Semi-finals ===
Division	Team 1	Team 2	Score
Men's Premier	East Grinstead	Surbiton	6-2
Men's Premier	Beeston	Reading	4-2
Women's Premier	Surbiton	Reading	4-1
Women's Premier	Canterbury	Clifton	2-0

=== Finals ===
Division	Team 1	Team 2	Score
Men's Premier	Beeston	East Grinstead	1-1 (3-1 p)
Women's Premier	Surbiton	Canterbury	3-0

== Men's Cup ==
=== Quarter-finals ===
Team 1	Team 2	Score
Old Loughtonians	Bromley & Beckenham	3-1
Brooklands MU	Beeston	4-3
Sevenoaks	Hampstead & Westminster	3-2
Cannock	Oxted	w/o (disq)

=== Semi-finals ===
Team 1	Team 2	Score
Brooklands MU	Old Loughtonians	5-4
Cannock	Sevenoaks	4-1

=== Final ===
(Held at the Highfields Sports Club, Nottingham on 3 May)

Team 1	Team 2	Score
Cannock	Brooklands MU	2-2 (5-4 p)

== Women's Cup ==
=== Quarter-finals ===
Team 1	Team 2	Score
Univ of Birmingham	Gloucester City	4-1
Hampstead & Westminster	Sevenoaks	4-2
Buckingham	Sutton Coldfield	6-0
Surbiton	Beeston	4-2

=== Semi-finals ===
Team 1	Team 2	Score
Hampstead & Westminster	Univ of Birmingham	3-2
Surbiton	Buckingham	5-1

=== Final ===
(Held at Highfields Hockey Centre, Nottingham on 26 April)

Team 1	Team 2	Score
Surbiton	Hampstead & Westminster	7-1
