= Steph Elliott =

English field hockey player

Stephanie Jane Elliott
Personal information
- Nationality: English
- Born: 24 September 1990 (age 35) Middlesbrough

Sport
- Country: Great Britain; England
- Sport: Field hockey
- Position: Defender/ Midfielder

Steph Elliott (born 24 September 1990) is a former English international field hockey player who played as a defender for England and Great Britain. She made her senior international debut in February 2013.

She plays club hockey in the Women's England Hockey League Premier Division for Surbiton.

Elliott previously played for and captained Holcombe. She also played for North Harbour in New Zealand on three occasions, with the most notable being in 2018, winning the K Cup.

She studied at Durham University.
