= Toby Roche =

English field hockey player

Personal information
- Born: 31 July 1988 (age 38)

Sport
- Sport: Field hockey
Senior career
Years	Team	Caps	Goals
2018–19	Hampstead & Westminster	19	2
2019–20	Hampstead & Westminster	13	1

Toby Roche (born 31 July 1988), is an English field hockey player and captain of Men's England Hockey League Premier Division Hampstead & Westminster First Team.

== Field hockey career ==
Born on 31 July 1988, Roche was educated at Abingdon School where he was captain of the first XI and gained colours.

He joined Hampstead & Westminster Hockey Club in the Men's Premier League Division of the EHL and subsequently was named as captain. He was called up for England A in 2012 and played against Wales.

His team reached the playoffs (League Finals Weekend) during the 2016–17 England Hockey League season and the following season they reached the playoff final losing out to Surbiton Hockey Club. During the 2018–19 Men's Hockey League season he captained the team as they became English champions gaining revenge over Surbiton in the final. A second successive title challenge the following season was ended when the play-offs were cancelled due to the COVID-19 pandemic in the United Kingdom.

== Personal life ==
His older brother Kieran Roche also played for Hampstead & Westminster in the Premier League from 2008 to 2011 after transferring from Team Bath Buccaneers in 2008.

== See also ==
List of Old Abingdonians
