= Holly Payne (field hockey) =

English field hockey player

Personal information
- Nationality: English
- Born: 11 July 1991 (age 35)
- Spouse: Leah Wilkinson (m. 2024)

Sport
- Country: Great Britain; England
- Sport: Field hockey
- Position: Midfield

Holly Payne (born 11 July 1991) is an English international field hockey player who plays as a midfielder for Great Britain and England.

== Biography ==
Payne played for Uni of Birmingham and Leicester before joining Surbiton in the Investec Women's Hockey League Premier Division.

In 2024, she married fellow player Leah Wilkinson.

During the 2024–25 Women's England Hockey League season she was part of the Surbiton team that finished runner-up in the league behind Reading.
