= 2019–20 Women's England Hockey League season =

English field hockey season

The 2019–20 Women's England Hockey League season (sponsored by Investec) is the 2019–20 season of England's field hockey league structure. The season started on 14 September 2019 and was due to end in April 2020 but finished on 5 September 2020 due to COVID-19 pandemic in the United Kingdom.

The defending champions are Surbiton. Conference North champions Loughborough Students and Conference East champions Hampstead & Westminster replaced the relegated Slough and Canterbury respectively.

Surbiton were declared champions following the end of the regular season because the playoffs were curtailed on 17 March 2020 due to COVID-19. Beeston Hockey Club won the delayed Championship Cup on 5 September 2020, defeating the defending champions Clifton Robinsons Hockey Club 3–2 in the final.

== Competing teams ==
=== Premier League ===
Pos	Team	P	W	L	D	GF	GA	GD	Pts
1	Surbiton	18	15	1	2	45	26	19	46
2	East Grinstead	18	12	3	3	48	21	27	39
3	Hampstead & Westminster	18	12	1	5	53	26	27	37
4	Buckingham	18	8	2	8	33	34	-1	26
5	Clifton Robinsons	18	7	2	9	29	35	-6	23
6	Holcombe	18	6	2	10	31	41	-10	20
7	Loughborough Students	18	6	2	10	24	35	-11	20
8	Beeston	18	6	0	12	19	36	-17	18
9	University of Birmingham	18	5	2	11	22	32	-10	17
10	Bowdon	18	4	3	11	19	37	-18	12+

+ Bowdon deducted 3 points for fielding an ineligible player

= Qualified for League finals weekend
= Playoff Position
= Relegated

== Play Offs ==
=== Semi-finals ===
Date	Team 1	Team 2	Score
Mar 29	Surbiton	Buckingham	cancelled +
Mar 29	East Grinstead	Hampstead & Westminster	cancelled +

=== Final ===
Date	Team 1	Team 2	Score
Apr 5	N/A	N/A	cancelled +

== England Hockey Women's Championship Cup ==
=== Quarter-finals ===
Team 1	Team 2	Score
University of Nottingham	Beeston	2-2 (2-3 pens)
Clifton Robinsons	Buckingham	7-1
Surbiton	Hampstead & Westminster	1-4
Bowdon	Ben Rhydding	4-2

=== Semi-finals ===
Team 1	Team 2	Score
Clifton Robinsons	Bowdon	1-0
Hampstead & Westminster	Beeston	w/o - conceded

=== Final ===
Team 1	Team 2	Score
Clifton Robinsons	Beeston	2-3

== See also ==
2019–20 Men's Hockey League season
