= Rose Thomas (field hockey) =

Welsh field hockey player

Personal information
- Full name: Roseanne Thomas
- Nationality: Welsh
- Born: 5 May 1992 (age 34) Abergavenny, Wales
- Home town: Caerleon, Wales

Sport
- Country: Great Britain; Wales
- Sport: Field hockey
- Position: Goalkeeper

Roseanne "Rose" Thomas (born 5 May 1992) in Abergavenny, Wales is a former Welsh international field hockey player who played as a goalkeeper for Wales and Great Britain.

She plays club hockey in the Women's England Hockey League South Division for Guildford Hockey Club.

Thomas has also played for Holcombe, Wimbledon, Clifton, Lewes Hockey Club and Newport Ladies Hockey Club.

She made her Wales full international debut in 2011 and has 89 caps and 4 caps for Great Britain.
