= Ian Taylor =

Ian Taylor may refer to:

- Ian Taylor (musician), American musician
- Ian Taylor (Australian politician), former Australian politician and Western Australian Deputy Premier and Opposition Leader
- Ian Taylor (bowls) (born 1957), Australian international lawn and indoor bowler
- Ian Taylor (British businessman) (1956–2020), Chief Executive Officer of Vitol
- Ian Taylor (British politician) (born 1945), British Conservative Party Member of Parliament
- Ian Taylor (field hockey) (born 1954), former England field hockey player
- Ian Taylor (footballer, born 1968), English football player (Aston Villa)
- Ian Taylor (footballer, born 1948), Scottish football player (Aberdeen FC)
- Ian Taylor (New Zealand businessman) (born 1950), businessman from Dunedin, New Zealand
- Ian Taylor (sociologist) (1944–2001), British sociologist
- Ian David Taylor (born 1938), British Olympic hockey player
