= David Kettle =

Welsh field hockey player

Personal information
- Born: 28 April 1988 (age 38) Ascot, England

Sport
- Sport: Field hockey
- Position: Goalkeeper
Senior career
Years	Team	Caps	Goals
2008–2009	Cannock	-	-
2011–2014	East Grinstead	-	-
2014–2016	Surbiton	-	-
2016–2017	Hampstead & Westminster	-	-
2017–2018	Teddington	-	-
National team
Years	Team	Caps	Goals
2009–2018	Wales	106	-

David James Kettle (born 28 April 1988) is a Welsh former field hockey player who has represented Wales. He competed for Wales at two Commonwealth Games.

== Biography ==
Kettle played for Cannock Hockey Club and East Grinstead Hockey Club in the Men's England Hockey League as a goalkeeper. While at Cannock, he made his Welsh debut in 2009.

He was signed by Surbiton Hockey Club for the 2014–15 season and around the same time was selected to represent the Welsh team at the 2014 Commonwealth Games in Glasgow. The following year he was named as a co-captain for the European Championships campaign.

At Teddington Hockey Club, in 2018, he was selected to represent the Welsh team at the 2018 Commonwealth Games in Gold Coast, Australia. Shortly after the Games, Kettle retired from international hockey after earning a record number of caps for a goalkeeper (106).
