= Patrick Smith (field hockey) =

British field hockey player

Paddy Smith
Personal information
- Born: 28 July 1991 (age 35) England

Sport
- Sport: Field hockey
- Position: Goalkeeper
Senior career
| Years | Team | Caps | Goals |
| 2009–2013 | Birmingham Univ | - | - |
| 2012–2014 | Cannock | - | - |
| 2014–2021 | East Grinstead | - | - |
National team
| Years | Team | Caps | Goals |
| – | England | | - |
| – | Great Britain | | - |
Medal record
Field hockey
Representing England
World League
| Bronze medal – third place | New Delhi | Team |

Patrick Smith (born 28 July 1991) is an English former field hockey goalkeeper who represented Great Britain and England.

== Biography ==
Smith was educated at Saffron Walden County High School and studied Maths and Philosophy at the University of Birmingham from 2009 to 2013. While playing for the University of Birmingham Hockey Club he received a call up to play for the England U21 team.

While at University he also played club hockey for Cannock Hockey Club in the Men's England Hockey League and represented England at the 2012 Men's Hockey Champions Trophy in Melbourne, Australia and won a bronze medal at the 2012–13 Men's FIH Hockey World League Final in New Delhi. He left the club after the 2013–14 England Hockey League season.

He then played for East Grinstead Hockey Club for seven years.

He retired from international hockey to concentrate on a career in finance, working for NatWest and Nomura before becoming a director at Song Capital Partners.
