= Graham Evans (field hockey) =

British field hockey player

Personal information
- Born: 3 May 1945
- Died: 20 May 2024 (aged 79)
- Height: 185 cm (6 ft 1 in)
- Weight: 68 kg (150 lb)

Sport
- Sport: Field hockey
Senior career
Years	Team	Caps	Goals
1966–1979	Surbiton	-	-
National team
Years	Team	Caps	Goals
–	England & Great Britain		-

Graham John Evans (3 May 1945 – 20 May 2024) was a British field hockey player. He competed in the men's tournament at the 1972 Summer Olympics.

== Biography ==
Evans made his Great Britain debut against West Germany on 21 October 1967.

Evans played for England at the 1973 Men's Hockey World Cup.
