= Jo Hunter =

English field hockey player

Personal information
- Born: 27 May 1991 (age 35) Aylesbury, England
- Height: 1.63 m (5 ft 4 in)
- Weight: 56 kg (123 lb)

Sport
- Sport: Field hockey
- Position: Forward
- Club: Reading
National team
Years	Team	Caps	Goals
2013–present	England	42	(5)
2017–present	Great Britain	32	(1)
–	ENGLAND & GB TOTAL:	74	(6)
Medal record
Women's field hockey
Representing England
Commonwealth Games
Bronze medal – third place	2018 Gold Coast	Team
European Championships
Bronze medal – third place	2017 Amsterdam
- Updated on 11 June 2021

Joanne Hunter married name Joanne Pinner (born 27 May 1991) is an English field hockey player who plays for the England and Great Britain national teams.

== Biography ==
On 4 February 2013 Hunter mader her senior international debut for England against South Africa.

In 2017 she married England hockey goalkeeper George Pinner and played under her married name thereafter.

Hunter played club hockey in the Women's England Hockey League Premier Division for Buckingham, Surbiton, Beeston, Leicester and Aylesbury HC.

Pinner became a mother in May 2023 before returning to hockey just four months later in September and joined Reading Hockey Club.

During the 2024–25 Women's England Hockey League season she was part of the Reading team that won the league title.
