= Peter Downton Croft =

English cricketer and hockey player (1933–2021)

Peter Croft
Personal information
- Born: 7 July 1933 Croydon, England
- Died: 18 July 2021 (aged 88) Croydon, England

Sport
- Sport: Field hockey
Senior career
Years	Team	Caps	Goals
1958–1967	Surbiton	-	-
National team
Years	Team	Caps	Goals
–	Great Britain		-
–	England		-

Peter Downton Croft (7 July 1933 – 18 July 2021) was an England and Great Britain field hockey player, a member of the British squad at the 1960 Summer Olympics, and also a first-class cricketer. He was usually known as Peter Croft. From 1953 to 1955 he served as a second lieutenant in the Royal Regiment of Artillery.

== Sporting life ==
Educated at Gresham's School, Holt, where he attended the junior and senior schools between 1945 and 1952, and then at the University of Cambridge, Croft excelled in two sports, hockey and cricket, representing his school and university at both.

At hockey, after gaining his Blue at Cambridge, Croft played for Surbiton, Surrey and later for the England national field hockey team. He represented Great Britain at the 1960 Summer Olympics in Rome.

Croft's first-class cricket career representing Cambridge University ran from 1955 to 1957 and gained him another Blue. He was a right-hand batsman and a right-arm offbreak bowler, with a batting average of 14.88.

Croft died on 18 July 2021, at the age of 88.
