= William Marshall (field hockey) =

Scottish field hockey player

Personal information
- Born: 26 September 1985 (age 40) Paisley, Renfrewshire, Scotland

Sport
- Sport: Field hockey
- Position: Defender
Senior career
Years	Team	Caps	Goals
–	Greenock	-	-
2006–2013	Kelburne	-	-
2013–2014	Sheffield	-	-
2014–2024	Surbiton	-	-
National team
Years	Team	Caps	Goals
2006–2019	Scotland	177	(19)
Medal record
Representing Scotland
European Championship II
Bronze medal – third place	2011 Vinnytsia	Team
Gold medal – first place	2017 Glasgow	Team

William Marshall (born 26 September 1985) is a Scottish former field hockey player who has represented Scotland at three Commonwealth Games.

== Biography ==
Marshall was born in Paisley, Renfrewshire, Scotland, and was educated at Ardgowan Primary and Glasgow School of Sport at Bellahouston Academy. He studied at the University of West of Scotland.

Marshall played club hockey for Kelburne Hockey Club in the Scottish Hockey Premiership and made his Scotland debut in 2006 in the Celtic Cup against Ireland and scored his first goal against Egypt. He played for Scotland during the 2010 Commonwealth Games in Delhi and won a bronze medal with the team at the 2011 Men's EuroHockey Championship II in Vinnytsia, Ukraine

After a year with Sheffield Hockey Club in the Men's England Hockey League, he signed for Surbiton Hockey Club, around the same time that he was in the Scotland team at the 2014 Commonwealth Games in Glasgow. He went on to win the league title with Surbiton during the 2016–17 season. He won a gold medal with Scotland at the 2017 Men's EuroHockey Championship II in Glasgow.

Marshall participated in his third Commonwealth Games, when part of the Scotland team that took part in the Commonwealth Games hockey tournament at the 2018 Commonwealth Games in Gold Coast, Australia.

He retired from international hockey in February 2019.
