= Ian David Taylor =

British field hockey player

Ian Taylor
Personal information
- Born: 18 April 1938 (age 88) Mexico

Sport
- Sport: Field hockey
Senior career
Years	Team	Caps	Goals
1956–1968	Brooklands Hockey Club	-	-
1958–1960	University of Oxford	-	-
National team
Years	Team	Caps	Goals
–	Great Britain		-
–	England		-

Ian David N. Taylor (born 18 April 1938) is a British field hockey player who competed at the 1960 Summer Olympics.

== Biography ==
Taylor studied at the University of Oxford and was secretary of the University team and gained his blue playing for the hockey team. He was a competent athlete and equalled the 100 metres sprint record of 9.8 seconds in an athletics match in June 1959.

Taylor represented Great Britain in the field hockey tournament at the 1960 Olympic Games in Rome.

Taylor played for and captained Lancashire at county level and Brooklands Hockey Club at club level.
