= Beckie Middleton =

English field hockey player

Personal information
- Nationality: English
- Born: 23 June 1986 (age 39)

Sport
- Country: Great Britain; England
- Sport: Field hockey
- Position: midfield, forward

Beckie Middleton (née Herbert) (born 23 June 1986) is an English international field hockey player who played as a forward for England and Great Britain until 2014.

She made her full international debut for England in 2003 and played the last of 104 games for England & GB in 2014.

She currently plays club hockey in the Investec Women's Hockey League Premier Division for Surbiton.

Middleton has also played for AMHC Pinoké Hockey Club in the Netherlands and Leicester.

She is married to former England & Great Britain international Captain, Barry Middleton.
