= Tim Atkins (field hockey) =

British field hockey player

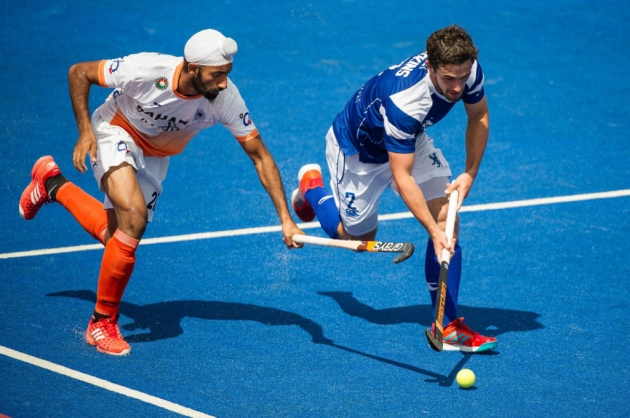

Personal information
- Born: 24 March 1990 (age 36) Oxford, England

Sport
- Sport: Field hockey
- Position: Defender
Senior career
Years	Team	Caps	Goals
–	Wallingford	-	-
2009-2013	Team Bath	-	-
2013-2014	Richmond	-	-
2014	Essendon, Melbourne	-	-
2016	HAHK Mladost, Zagreb	-	-
2015–2018	Reading	-	-
2018–2019	Surbiton	-	-
2019–2021	Old Georgians	-	-
2022–	Clifton Robinson	-	-
National team
Years	Team	Caps	Goals
2017–	Scotland	33	(2)
Medal record
Representing Scotland
European Championship II
Gold medal – first place	2017 Glasgow	Team

Timothy Christopher Atkins (born 24 March 1990) is a British field hockey player who played for the Scotland men's national field hockey team.

== Biography ==
Atkins was born in Oxford, was educated at Streatley School and The Oratory School.

Atkins started his hockey career at the age of 5 after joining Wallingford Hockey Club. He played the majority of his senior hockey club career at Reading Hockey Club in the Men's England Hockey League.

While at Reading, his won first international cap for Scotland in March 2017 at World League 2 and won a gold medal with Scotland at the 2017 Men's EuroHockey Championship II in Glasgow.

At the end of the 2017–18 season, he left Reading to play for Surbiton Hockey Club.

in August 2019, he was selected in the Scotland squad for the 2019 EuroHockey Championship and around the same time, he signed for Old Georgians Hockey Club for the beginning of the 2019–20 season.

He is also a type 1 diabetic working closely with Diabetes UK.
