= Emily Maguire (field hockey) =

Scottish field hockey player

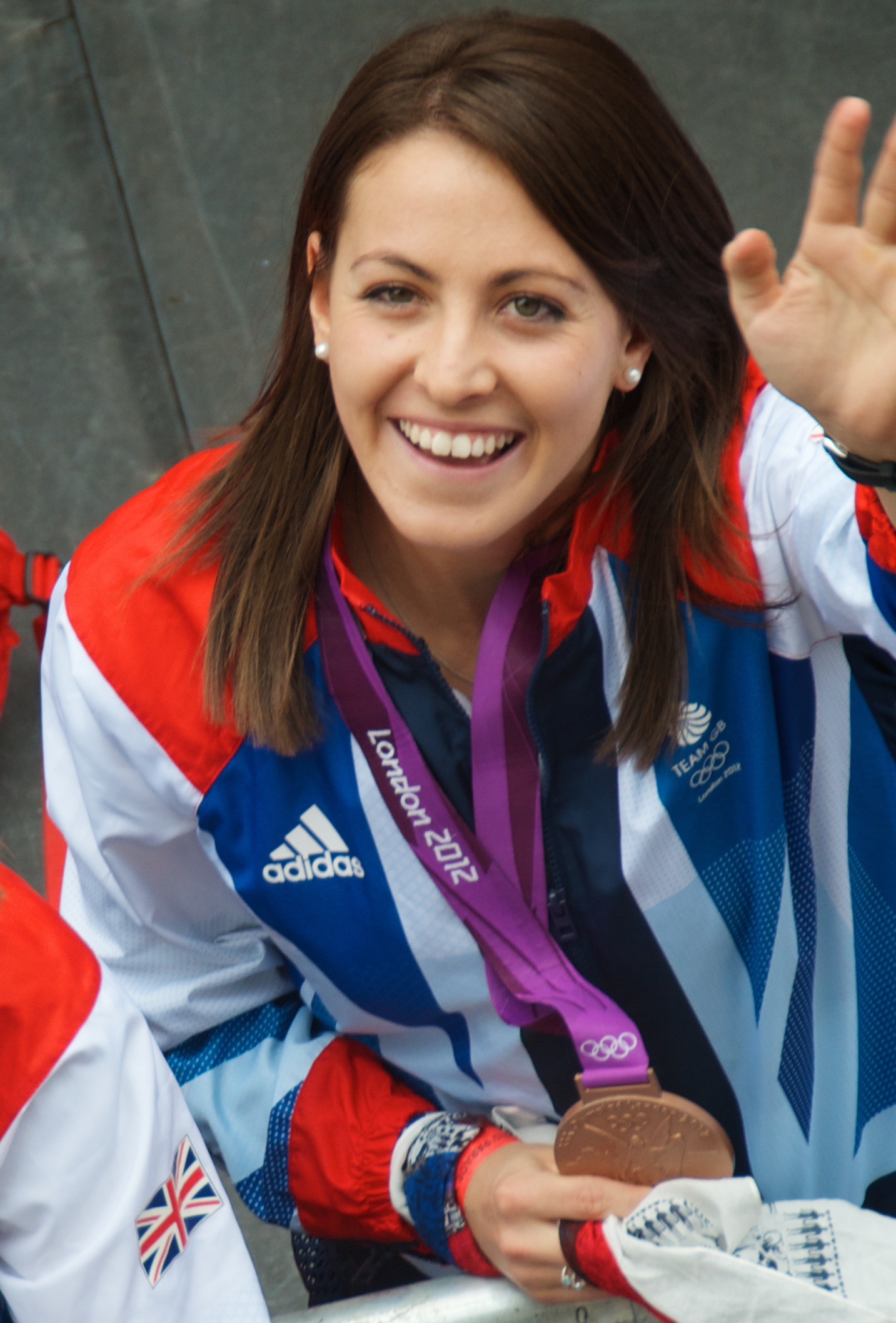

Personal information
- Born: 17 December 1987 (age 38) Glasgow, Scotland
Medal record
Women's Field hockey
Representing United Kingdom
Summer Olympics
Bronze medal – third place	2012 London	Team
FIH Champions Trophy
Silver medal – second place	2012 Rosario	Team
Representing Scotland
EuroHockey Nations Trophy
Gold medal – first place	2011 Poznan	Team
FIH Champions Challenge I
Bronze medal – third place	2011 Dublin	Team

Emily Maguire (born 17 December 1987 in Glasgow) is a Scottish international field hockey player who plays as a defender. She represented Great Britain at the 2012 Summer Olympics. She competed for the national team in the women's tournament, winning a bronze medal.

With over 150 international caps, she also represented Scotland at the 2010 and 2014 Commonwealth Games Maguire helped Scotland retain its A division status at the EHF Nations Championship in 2013 and in 2015.

In June 2015 she was selected in the victorious Great Britain team at the 2015 Hockey World League Semi Finals which secured qualification for the 2016 Summer Olympics.

Maguire currently plays club hockey in the Investec Women's Hockey League Conference East for Hampstead & Westminster.

She is a product of the Kelburne Hockey Club, Paisley, Scotland. She has also played club hockey for Reading (2009–15) and for Holcombe (2015–17).

Maguire retired from international hockey in November 2016 with a total of 177 international caps (118 caps for Scotland and 59 for caps Great Britain).

She graduated with a degree in Mathematics and Statistics from the University of Glasgow in 2009.

Maguire works at Investec Bank in the Corporate and Institutional Treasury Desk.

== Club honours ==
- England Hockey League

Winners: 2010–11, 2012–13

- England Hockey Indoor Championships

Winners: 2012–13, 2013–14

- EuroHockey Club Champions Trophy

Winners 2012–13

- EuroHockey Indoor Club Champions Trophy

Winners: 2013–14
