= Abi Walker =

Scottish surgeon and retired hockey player

Abigail "Abi" Walker
- Born: 29 January 1982 (age 44); Glasgow
- Education: University of Glasgow
- Occupation: Surgeon
- Known for: former international field hockey goalkeeper for Scotland and Great Britain
- Medical career
- Sub-specialties: Ear nose and throat surgery

Abigail "Abi" Walker (born 29 January 1982) is a Scottish surgeon and retired international female field hockey goalkeeper.

== Medical career ==
Walker studied medicine at the University of Glasgow and qualified as a doctor in 2006. She passed her postgraduate examinations and gained MRCS in 2009.

In 2018, Walker was selected as a Churchill Fellow to investigate treatments for adults and children with facial pain in the United States.

== Hockey career ==
Walker played for Canterbury Hockey Club and Bearsden. She gained her first cap for Scotland against Chile in 2003. In February 2013, she announced her decision to retire from international competition, having made 65 appearances for the Scotland team.

She made 65 appearances for the Women's National Team and won 17 caps for Great Britain.
