= David Mathews (field hockey) =

English field hockey player

Personal information
- Born: 25 May 1977 (age 49) England

Sport
- Sport: Field hockey
- Position: Forward
Senior career
Years	Team	Caps	Goals
1995–2002	Canterbury	-	-
2002–2005	Amsterdam	-	-
2005–2008	Canterbury	-	-
2008–2010	Holcombe	-	-
National team
Years	Team	Caps	Goals
–	GB & England	62	-

David Mathews (born 25 May 1977) is a retired English field hockey player.

== Biography ==
Mathews was educated at Simon Langton School and played club hockey for Canterbury in the Men's England Hockey League. While at Canterbury he was part of the England squad that competed in the men's tournament at the 2002 Commonwealth Games in Manchester.

Later, Mathews played club hockey for in Netherlands playing for Amsterdam and after another spell with Canterbury then played for Holcombe.

Mathews was a player/assistant coach for 9 years at Canterbury and head coach for Richmond Hockey Club for 6 years. Additionally, he worked as head of hockey for Gordon's School. In 2021, Mathews was appointed Director of Hockey at Old Cranleighan Hockey Club.
