= Michael Hoare (field hockey) =

English field hockey player (born 1985)

Mikey Hoare
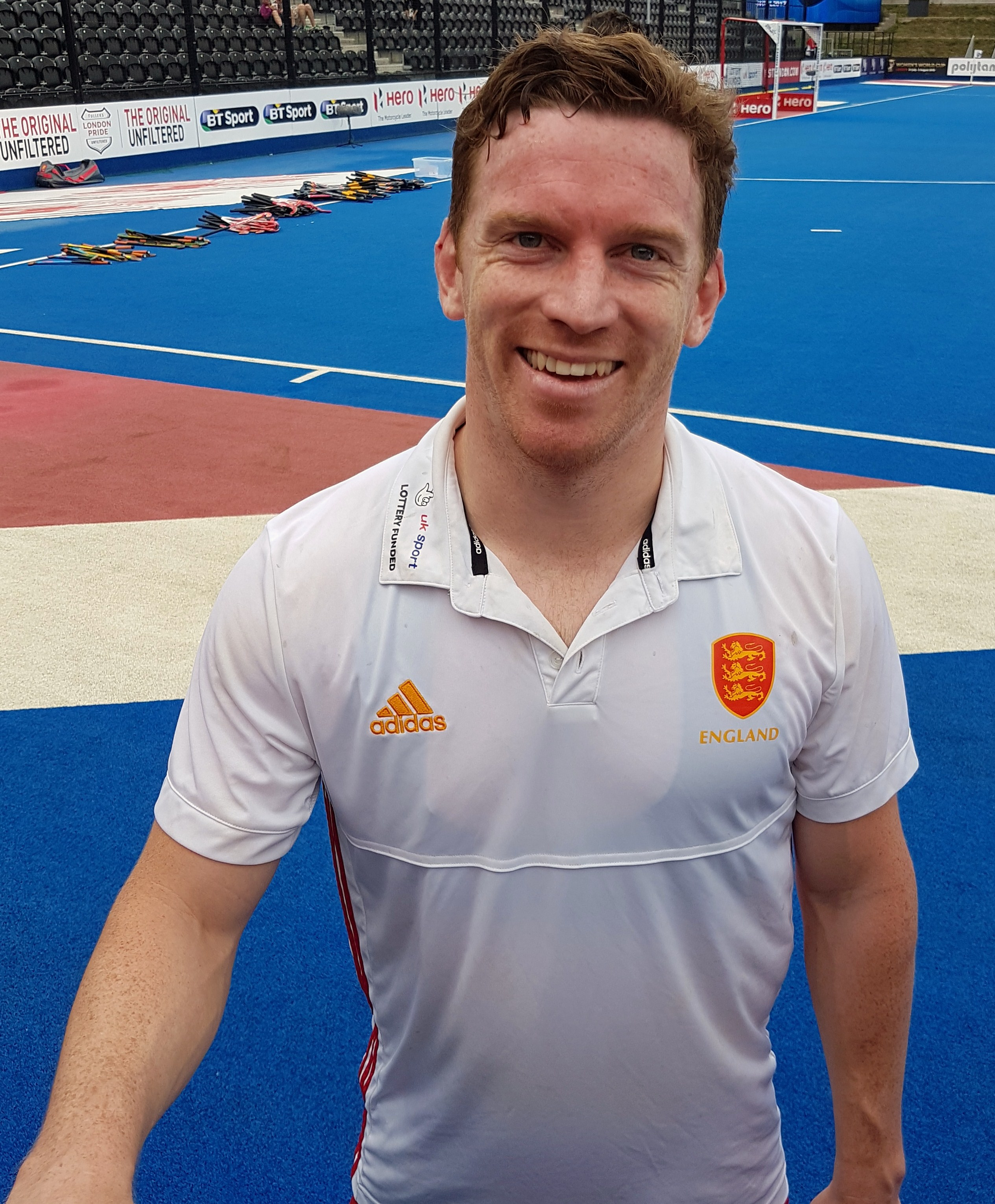
- Hoare at Lee Valley Hockey Centre in June 2017

Personal information
- Born: 14 November 1985 (age 40)
- Height: 1.77 m (5 ft 10 in)

Sport
- Sport: Field hockey
- Position: Defender
Senior career
Years	Team	Caps	Goals
–2005	Formby	-	-
2005–2012	Bowdon	-	-
2012–2013	Beeston	-	-
2013–2022	Wimbledon	-	-
National team
Years	Team	Caps	Goals
2012–2022	England & GB	156	(2)
Medal record
Representing England
Commonwealth Games
Bronze medal – third place	2014 Glasgow	Team
World League
Bronze medal – third place	2014 New Delhi	Team
EuroHockey Championship
Bronze medal – third place	2017 Amstelveen	Team

Michael James Peter Hoare (born 14 November 1985) is an English former international field hockey player who played as a defender for England and Great Britain. He competed at the 2016 Summer Olympics

== Biography ==
Hoare was educated at Range High School, Formby, Merseyside and started playing club hockey for Formby Hockey Club. In 2005, he joined Bowdon in the Men's England Hockey League and stayed with them for seven years.

For the 2012/13 season, Hoare joined Beeston and made his England debut against India in the December 2012 Champions Trophy. The following season he moved clubs to play for Wimbledon.

While at Wimbledon, he competed for England in the men's hockey tournament at the 2014 Commonwealth Games where he won a bronze medal and represented Great Britain at the 2016 Olympic Games in Rio de Janeiro.

Michael is a qualified PE teacher and hockey coach and became Director of Hockey Development at Amersham & Chalfont HC. As well as the founder and Director of a new coaching company The Hockey Lab. In 2023, he became Head of High Performance Hockey at Repton School.
