= Giselle Ansley =

British field hockey player

Giselle Ansley MBE
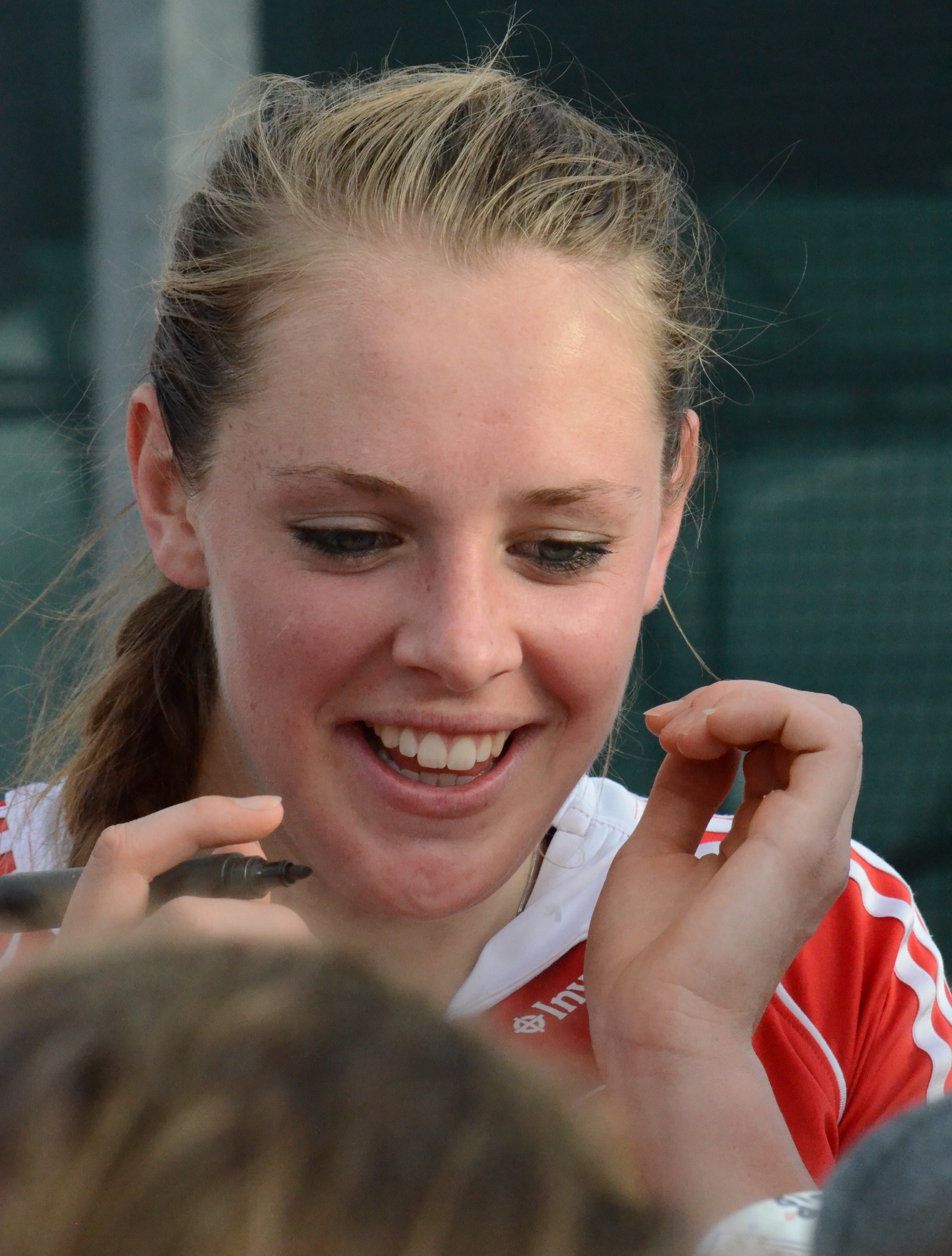
- Ansley in 2013

Personal information
- Born: 31 March 1992 (age 34) Kingsbridge, Devon, England
- Height: 1.76 m (5 ft 9 in)
- Weight: 73 kg (161 lb)

Sport
- Sport: Field hockey
- Position: Defender
- Club: Surbiton
Senior career
Years	Team	Caps	Goals
2006–2010 2010–2013 2013–2021, 2024– 2021–2023	Plymouth Marjon; Loughborough Students; Surbiton; HGC	-	-
National team
Years	Team	Caps	Goals
2013–	England	95	(15)
2014–	Great Britain	78	(9)
–	ENGLAND & GB TOTAL:	173	(24)
Medal record
Representing Great Britain
Olympic Games
Gold medal – first place	2016 Rio de Janeiro	Team
Bronze medal – third place	2020 Tokyo	Team
Representing England
Commonwealth Games
Gold medal – first place	2022 Birmingham	Team
Silver medal – second place	2014 Glasgow	Team
Bronze medal – third place	2018 Gold Coast	Team
European Championship
Gold medal – first place	2015 London
Silver medal – second place	2013 Boom
Bronze medal – third place	2017 Amstelveen
- Updated on 8 August 2022

Giselle Anne Ansley (born 31 March 1992) is an English field hockey player who plays as a defender for the England and Great Britain national teams.

== Biography ==
Ansley was educated at Churston Ferrers Grammar School, Brixham, Devon.

She was appointed Member of the Order of the British Empire (MBE) in the 2017 New Year Honours for services to hockey.

In 2018, she received an honorary degree from Loughborough University.

== Club career ==
Ansley plays club hockey in the Dutch Hoofdklasse for HGC.

She played club hockey in the Women's England Hockey League Premier Division for Surbiton, Loughborough Students and Plymouth Marjon.

Ansley returned to Surbiton and during the 2024–25 Women's England Hockey League season she was part of the Surbiton team that finished runner-up in the league behind Reading.

== International career ==
Ansley made her international debut in 2013. She competed for England in the women's hockey tournament at the 2014 Commonwealth Games where she won a silver medal.

She competed in the 2016 Summer Olympics in Rio de Janeiro, winning a gold medal in a penalty shootout against the defending champions Netherlands.

Having won a combined 173 caps for England and Great Britain, Ansley announced her retirement from international hockey in September 2024.
