= Nicky Parkes =

Scottish field hockey player

Personal information
- Born: 11 February 1990 (age 36) Glasgow, Scotland

Sport
- Sport: Field hockey
- Position: Midfielder
Senior career
Years	Team	Caps	Goals
2012–2022	Surbiton	-	-
2022–2024	Reading	-	-
National team
Years	Team	Caps	Goals
2013–2019	Scotland	100	(14)
Medal record
Representing Scotland
European Championship II
Bronze medal – third place	2015 Prague	Team
Gold medal – first place	2017 Glasgow	Team

Nicholas Christopher Andrew Parkes (born 11 February 1990) is a Scottish field hockey player who plays as a midfielder for the Scottish national team.

== Biography ==
Parkes is a product of the highly successful Western Wildcats Hockey Club junior section. His talent was obvious from an early age and he represented Western, West District and Scotland at junior age groups. He became an established first team player before going to Cambridge University and quickly established himself in the Cambridge team. He captained Cambridge to a victory in the 2012 Varsity match. After Cambridge he played for Shieffield Hallam HC.

He joined Surbiton in the Men's England Hockey League Premier Division, where he won the league title in 2016/17 and 2017/18.

He represented Scotland in the 2014 Commonwealth Games at Glasgow and won a bronze medal with Scotland at the 2015 Men's EuroHockey Championship II in Prague. He won a gold medal with Scotland at the 2017 Men's EuroHockey Championship II in Glasgow.

He went to his second Commonwealth Games after being selected to represent Scotland at the 2018 Commonwealth Games in Gold Coast.

In August 2019, he was selected in the Scotland squad for the 2019 EuroHockey Championship and shortly afterwards in October announced his international retirement.

Parkes joined Reading Hockey Club for the 2022/2023 season.
