= Surbiton Hockey Club =

English field hockey team

- Full name: Surbiton Hockey Club
- League: Men's England Hockey League; Women's England Hockey League
- Founded: 1874; 152 years ago
- Home ground: Sugden Road, Long Ditton

Personnel
- Chairman: Andy Powdrell
- Website: https://surbitonhc.com/
Home

Surbiton Hockey Club is a professional field hockey club based in Long Ditton, Surrey, England. The club is one of the oldest hockey clubs in the world, being established in 1874. The home ground is based in Long Ditton, at Sugden Road. The women's team have been champions of England on nine occasions and the men's team have been champions of England three times.

== Teams ==
The Men's 1st Team play in the Men's England Hockey League and the Ladies 1st Team play in the Women's England Hockey League. The club fields twelve men's sides, including one veterans and one super-vets team, as well as eight ladies sides and also youth sides.

The men's 2nd, 3rd, 4th and 5th teams play in divisions of the Higgins Group London Hockey League, while the 'Jokers' and 'Magnets' sides play in the veterans section of this league. The 4As play in the Surrey Area Division 2 of the South Hockey League. The 6th, 7th, 8th teams and the 'Sparticans' play in the Surrey Open Hockey League. The ladies' 2nd and 3rd teams play in the South Clubs' Women's Hockey League while the 4th, 5th, 6th, 7th, 8th and 9th teams play in the Surrey Ladies Hockey League. The boys and girls teams (U-11 up to U-18) play in the Mercian Home Counties Colts Hockey League.

== History ==
=== Formative years ===
Founded in 1874, Surbiton is the second oldest hockey club in the world. Surbiton has continuously played the modern game of hockey excluding the duration of World War I and World War II. The first competitive match was played on 3 February 1875 against Teddington in Bushy Park, winning by two goals to one and the club remained unbeaten until 26 January 1878.

=== Post-war years ===
Surbiton was the first winner of the London League in 1970. In the 1970s however, the club's fortunes declined and the Club management embarked on a major youth training and club development programme. The first of the "home grown" players came into the 1st Xl in 1984 and started the turnaround in the club's on-pitch fortunes by winning the Surrey Cup in 1986 and finishing 6th in the London League.

The club did not make it into the National League when it started (in 1988), but Surbiton went on to win the London League in 1990 and again in 1991, thereby gaining entry to the 2nd Division of the National League. Immediate promotion to the 1st Division (then the top division) was gained by winning the 2nd Division, but was followed disappointingly by relegation in 1993. Over the next four seasons, promotion was again followed by relegation, before the Club cemented its place among the elite in the Premier Division in 1999.

In 2001, Surbiton finished 2nd in the Premier Division and won the Premier Division playoffs. As a result, they were one of England's representatives in the European Club Championship in Antwerp in 2002. They lost the bronze medal match to Egara, the Spanish representatives. In 2002, Surbiton finished 2nd again in the Premier Division, but lost the Premier play-offs final to Reading 3–2. As a result, they represented England in the European Cup Winners Cup in Spain in 2003. Surbiton's first European medal came upon beating the Polish representatives in a tight game to earn the bronze. In 2003, Surbiton finished 3rd in the Premier Division, but lost their first game in the play-offs to Loughborough Students, immediately after returning from Spain.

From the 2004-05 season, Surbiton Ladies rose from the Surrey Ladies League Premier Division, up to the Investec Women's Hockey League Premier Division. Having been relegated from the South Clubs' Women's Hockey League Division Two to the Surrey League in 2003/-04, Surbiton Ladies discovered that on their return to the regional league, the South League had added a third division, split into two regions (3A and 3B). They won Division 3B at the first attempt; and after finishing fourth, then second, in their first two seasons in Division 2; won promotion to Division 1 in 2008/-09. At the end of the 2009/-10 season, they won promotion to the Women's England Hockey League for the first time in their history, after their second successive championship triumph, finishing top of SCWHL Division 1. In 2010/-11, Surbiton Ladies finished as runners-up to Sevenoaks in the newly sponsored Investec Women's Hockey League Conference East; and then in 2011/12 Surbiton won the Conference East, and then finished second in the Investec Promotion Tournament, to ensure that they would play in the Investec Women's Hockey League Premier Division in 2012/-13. In addition, Surbiton Ladies have played in two successive Investec Women's Cup finals whilst in the Conference East, losing 4–1 to Premier Division opposition on both occasions (Bowdon Hightown in 2010–11; and the University of Birmingham in 2011–12).

The 2012/13 season began with a poor run of results for the men's team that saw Surbiton rooted to the bottom of the National Premier League. With the shock transfer of captain Tim Deakin to struggling rivals East Grinstead during the winter break, Surbiton faced the unenviable task of rebuilding their season without their talismanic defender. However, new coach Todd Williams and his relatively young squad turned their fortunes round to finish the season in second place, qualifying for the play-offs and beating already-crowned champions Beeston 6-1 along the way. This victory was not to be the high point of the season, as the squad then qualified for the EuroHockey League for the first time in their history by beating Canterbury 5–2 in the play-off semi-final.

=== England league domination ===
The club became the leading club in England with the women's team winning the league for eight years in succession, from 2014 to 2022 and again in 2024.

The men's team also won three out of four league titles from 2017 to 2020. and won another title during the 2024–25 Men's England Hockey League season.

== Location ==
Surbiton's current home ground constitutes one water-based and one sand-based Edel Grass pitch. The old second (sand-based) pitch (referred to by some club members as "The Beach") was replaced by the second water-based pitch as part of the club's re-development over summer 2013. The preceding months had seen a total of £1 million raised, including grants from Sport England as well as SHC's own fundraising initiatives - under the banner "Bye Bye To The Beach".

Further club refurbishment over the summer also included an expanded kitchen facility and an increase in the number of changing rooms and toilets. Surbiton's original home ground was on Balaclava Road but moved to Sugden Road in 1908, to make way for the Seething Wells water works. The current pavilion building was first erected in 1986, with the first artificial pitch being installed in 1991 - the second pitch was added in 1995.

== Colours and crest ==
The club colours are white, green and magenta. This is embodied on the club shirt which is predominantly white with a single magenta strip across the chest and a single dark green strip directly underneath. The club's crest is on the two stripes in white on the left breast, while the kit sponsor is on the right. The current shirt sponsor (as of October 2013) is BT Sport. This shirt is worn with dark blue shorts/skorts and dark green socks with white trim, and thin white/magenta hoops. The current shorts sponsor (as of October 2013) is Weybridge based specialist gym (Locker 27), which the Men's 1st XI occasionally use for strength and conditioning training.

The Men's 1st XI's away strip consists of a black shirt worn with white shorts and magenta socks. The rest of the club continues to wear the more renowned dark green shirt of previous seasons. This shirt has magenta and white stripes in similar fashion to the home shirt (the white stripe replaces the green stripe). This is also worn with dark blue shorts/skorts but with all-white socks.

The club crest is a very simple design bearing the 'SHC' abbreviation of the club's name, with 'Surbiton 1874' underneath.

== Legacy ==
Surbiton was originally involved in many of the developments which mark out hockey as a different pitch game from any other – the striking circle, two umpires, and stopping the ball before a penalty corner shot, for example. The club was also instrumental in taking hockey to schools and universities during the latter part of the 19th century, whilst International and Divisional matches were also played on its original ground at Balaclava Road in Surbiton.

The club was a founder member of the Hockey Association in 1886 and is currently one of three Surrey-based clubs playing in the National League (the others being Guildford and Oxted). The block fixture system, whereby on the same day every team in the club played the equal level team in another club, provided the solid foundation on which hockey thrived right up to the starting of the leagues in the late 1960s. The 600-strong Colts' section now provides the opportunity for talented young players to progress to county, divisional and national age group representative sides, as well as to the top sides in the Club itself. Several players have made this progression and some are current first team members. One player, Brett Garrard, began his hockey career at Surbiton and went on to become Great Britain and England's most capped player of all time. He now coaches the Surbiton ladies 1st XI.

Surbiton has always been a well-travelled touring club, with their infamous Strollers starting the Easter touring tradition in 1928. The Keeper of the Banana and associated rituals continue into the 21st Century and such is the size of the club that this has given birth to other touring sides, the most notable including the Lastminute Crusaders and Pirates of Kazakhstan.

== Players ==
=== Men's First Team Squad 2025–26 season ===
- 1. Calum Douglas (goalkeeper)
- 2. Dewi Roblin (goalkeeper)
- 3. Luke Taylor
- 4. Rob Farrington
- 5. Max Anderson
- 6. Nick Nurse
- 7. Jonny Gall
- 8. Tim Nurse
- 9. Tommy Austin
- 10. Nick Park
- 11. Jacob Payton
- 13. Nic Morgan
- 14. Louis Gittens
- 15. Barry Middleton
- 17. Stuart Rushmere
- 18. Gareth Furlong
- 19. David Goodfield (captain)
- 21. Adam Buckle
- 22. William Haspel
- 23. Nick Bandurak
- 24. Owen Barnes
- 26. James Gall
- 27. Conor Williamson
- 29. Jack Hobkirk
- 30. Mark Haycroft (goalkeeper)
- 31. Will Calnan

=== Ladies First Team Squad 2025–26 season ===
- 1. Ayeisha McFerran (goalkeeper)
- 2. Giselle Ansley
- 5. Darcy Bourne
- 6. Alice Wills
- 8. Erica Sanders (captain)
- 10. Georgie Gardens
- 12. Sophie Hamilton
- 13. Eloise Stenner
- 14. Madeleine Axford
- 15. Martha Taylor
- 17. Ellie Mackenzie
- 19. Katie Curtis
- 20. Amy Costello
- 21. Isabelle Yonge
- 23. Alice Sharp
- 24. Josefina Hippe
- 26. Ella Burnley

== Honours ==
=== Men's ===
- Men's England Hockey League
  - Winners: 2016–17, 2017–18, 2019–20, 2024–25: 4
- National Cup
  - Winners: 2012–13: 1

=== Women's ===
- Women's England Hockey League
  - Winners: 2013–14, 2014–15, 2015–16, 2016–17, 2017–18, 2018–19, 2019–20, 2021–22, [2023–24: 9
- National Cup
  - Winners: 2013–14, 2014–15, 2016–17, 2017–18: 4

== Notable players ==
=== Men's internationals ===
Extended content

Player	Events/Notes	Ref
(England) Richard Alexander	Oly (2008), CG (2006, 2010), WC (2006, 2010)	
(England) Liam Ansell		
(England) Liam Ansell		
(Scotland) Tim Atkins		
(Scotland) Thomas Austin	EC (2025)	
(England) Will Calnan		
(South Africa) Gregg Clark		
(England) Peter Croft	Oly (1960)	
(England) Brendan Creed	Oly (2020), CG (2018, 2022), EC (2023)	
(England) Matt Daly	Oly (2008, 2012), CG (2006), WC (2006)	
(England) Jim Deegan	Oly (1968)	
(Scotland) Calum Douglas	EC (2025)	
(England) Jon Ebsworth	CG (2006)	
(England) Graham Evans	Oly (1972), WC (1973)	
(Scotland) Alan Forsyth	Oly (2020), CG (2014, 2018)	
(South Africa) Grant Fulton		
(Wales) Gareth Furlong	Oly (2024), CG (2018, 2022), WC (2023), EC (2023, 2025)	
(England) James Gall	Oly (2020), CG (2018), WC (2018), EC (2023, 2025)	
(England) Brett Garrard	Oly (2000, 2004), CG (2002, 2006), WC (2002, 2006)	
(England) Harry Gibson	CG (2018), WC (2018)	
(England) Calum Giles	Oly (2000)	
(Scotland) Jamie Golden	CG (2022)	
(England) David Goodfield	Oly (2024), CG (2018, 2022), WC (2023) EC (2023, 2025)	
(Scotland) Chris Grassick	CG (2014, 2018, 2022)	
(England) Ben Hawes	Oly (2004, 2008), WC (2006, 2010)	
(England) Stuart Head		
(South Africa) Craig Jackson		
(Wales) David Kettle	CG (2014)	
(England) David Luckes	Oly (2000)	
(England) Ben Marsden	Oly (2008), CG (2006)	
(Scotland) William Marshall	CG (2018), EC (2017)	
(England) James Mazarelo	CG (2022), WC (2023), EC (2023, 2025)	
(England) Rob Moore	Oly (2008, 2012), CG (2006, 2010), WC (2006, 2010)	
(Wales) Nicholas Morgan	EC (2025)	
(South Africa) Greg Nicol		
(England) Tim Nurse	Oly (2024), EC (2023, 2025)	
(England) Nick Park	Oly (2024), CG (2022), WC (2023), EC (2023, 2025)	
(Scotland) Nicky Parkes	CG (2014, 2018)	
(England) Jacob Payton	EC (2025)	
(England) Mark Pearn		
(Wales) Lewis Prosser	CG (2018)	
(England) Stuart Rushmere	CG (2022), WC (2023), EC (2025)	
(England) Tom Sorsby	Oly (2020), CG (2022), WC (2023), EC (2023)	
(Gibraltar) Karl Stagno		
(England) Luke Taylor	WC (2018)	
(England) James Tindall	Oly (2008, 2012), CG (2006, 2010), WC (2006, 2010)	
(England) Zach Wallace	Oly (2020), WC (2018)	
(England) Jimmy Wallis	Oly (2004), CG (2002), WC (2002)	
(Republic of Ireland) Michael Watt		
(England) Bill Waugh	CG (2002), WC (2002)	
(England) Conor Williamson	Oly (2024), EC (2025)	

Key

- Oly = Olympic Games
- CG = Commonwealth Games
- WC = World Cup
- CT = Champions Trophy
- EC = European Championships

=== Women's internationals ===
Extended content

Player	Events/Notes	Ref
(England) Giselle Ansley		
(England) Sophie Bray		
(New Zealand) Michaela Curtis		
(England) Emily Defroand		
(Australia) Naomi Evans		
(England) Sarah Evans		
(England) Sophie Hamilton		
(England) Sabbie Heesh		
(England) Jo Hunter		
(England) Beckie Middleton		
(England) Hannah Martin		
(New Zealand) Grace O'Hanlon		
(England) Holly Payne		
(England) Hollie Pearne-Webb		
(England) Izzy Petter		
(England) Erica Sanders		
(England) Georgie Twigg		
(Scotland) Abi Walker		

Key

- Oly = Olympic Games
- CG = Commonwealth Games
- WC = World Cup
- CT = Champions Trophy
- EC = European Championships
