= Harry Gibson (field hockey) =

English field hockey player

Personal information
- Born: 25 March 1993 (age 33) Taunton, England
- Height: 1.89 m (6 ft 2 in)

Sport
- Sport: Field hockey
- Position: Goalkeeper
Senior career
Years	Team	Caps	Goals
–2014	Loughborough Students	-	-
2014–2016	Hampstead & Westminster	-	-
2016–2022	Surbiton	-	-
National team
Years	Team	Caps	Goals
2013–2014	England & GB U21	27	-
2015–2021	GB	41	(0)
2017–2021	England	36	(0)
Medal record
Men's field hockey
Representing England
EuroHockey Championship
Bronze medal – third place	2017 Amstelveen
Commonwealth Games
Bronze medal – third place	2018 Gold Coast	Team
EuroHockey Junior Championship
Bronze medal – third place	2014 Waterloo

Harry Jay Gibson (born 25 March 1993) is an English field hockey player, who played as a goalkeeper for the England and Great Britain national teams.

== Biography ==
Gibson was born in Taunton, England, and educated at Millfield in Street, Somerset.

He played club hockey in the Men's England Hockey League for Loughborough Students before joining Hampstead & Westminster in 2014.

In October 2015, he made his senior Great Britain debut against Argentina and joined Premier Division Surbiton for the 2016 season. While at Surbiton he made his England debut in March 2017 and represented England and won a bronze medal at the 2018 Commonwealth Games in Gold Coast.

In December 2021, Gibson announced his retirement from international hockey.
