= Cannock Hockey Club =

Field hockey club in Staffordshire, England

Coordinates: 52.686214°N 2.067859°W

Cannock
- Full name: Cannock Hockey Club
- Founded: 1905; 121 years ago
- Ground: Chase Park, Church Lane, Hatherton, Cannock
- League: Midlands Men's League; Women's England Hockey League
- Seven times men's league champions
- Website: http://www.cannockhockey.com/

Cannock Hockey Club are an English professional field hockey team. They were established in 1905, and are based in the village of Hatherton, near Cannock, Staffordshire. Both the men's and women's first teams have played in the England Hockey League Premier Division, the top division of hockey in England. The women’s first team play in the Midlands Conference, whilst the men’s first team play in Midlands Division 2.

== History ==
Founded in 1905, the men's first team was the most successful team in the country having won seven Men's England Hockey League titles from 1995 to 2006. Additionally they have won four National cup competitions and three Super Cups. They have also provided several international players to England and other national teams.

Their home ground, Chase Park (formerly The Morris Ground), has hosted various national and international tournaments, including the EuroHockey Club Champions Cup in 2000 and 2006. It has also hosted England matches, particularly while the National Hockey Stadium was in use by Milton Keynes Dons football team. Chase Park was also used as a pre-games training venue for the 2012 London Olympics.

In recent years the club suffered a series of unfortunate events, with the men's first XI being relegated from the Premier Division during the 2015–16 England Hockey League season. Then in June 2019, the club found themselves locked out of their home as receivers took over the site. Players left and the club's teams struggled to find available pitches to fulfill their fixture. The club became known as the Cannock Community Hockey Club and played in local leagues, the men in the Midlands Men's League and the women in the Midlands Premier League.

However at the beginning of the 2022/23 season the club began to move upwards again with the teams being allowed to play from Chase Park again and the women's first XI playing in the Conference Midland division of the 2022–23 Women's England Hockey League season after gaining promotion the previous season.

== Major National Honours ==
National champions

- 1995–96 Men's League Champions
- 1997–98 Men's League Champions
- 1998–99 Men's League Champions
- 2002–03 Men's League Champions
- 2003–04 Men's League Champions
- 2004–05 Men's League Champions
- 2005–06 Men's League Champions

National Cup winners

- 1997–98 Men's Cup winners
- 2001–02 Men's Cup winners
- 2004–05 Men's Cup winners
- 2013–14 Men's Cup winners

Premiership Tournament/Super Cup winners

- Men's 1998–1999
- Men's 1999–2000
- Men's 2004–2005

== Notable players ==
=== Men's internationals ===
Extended content

Player	Events	Notes/Ref
(Scotland) Russell Anderson	CG (2018)	
(England) Nick Bandurak		
(England) Scott Cordon	CG (2006), WC (2006)	
(Scotland) Dan Coultas	2012–2013	
(England) Bobby Crutchley	CG (1998), WC (2006)	
(Wales) Paul Edwards	CG (2002)	
(England) James Fair	Oly (2012), CG (2010), WC (2006, 2010)	
(England) Julian Halls	Oly (2000)	
(England) Andy Humphrey	WC (1998, 2002)	
(England) Michael Johnson	Oly (2000, 2004), CG (1998, 2002), WC (2002)	
(England) Martin Jones	CG (2006), WC (2002, 2006)	
(Wales) David Kettle	2008–2009	
(England) Jimi Lewis	CG (2002), WC (2002)	
(Republic of Ireland) Stuart Loughrey		
(England) Chris Mayer	Oly (1996), WC (1990, 1994)	
(England) Barry Middleton	Oly (2004), CG (2006), WC (2006)	
(Wales) Simon Organ	CG (2002)	
(England) Craig Parnham	Oly (2000, 2004), CG (2002), WC (2002)	
(England) Justin Pidcock	CG (1998), WC (1998)	
(England) Ben Sharpe	Oly (2000), CG (1998), WC (1998, 2002)	
(England) Patrick Smith	CT (2012)	
(England) Kalbir Takher	Oly (1996), WC (1994)	

Key

- Oly = Olympic Games
- CG = Commonwealth Games
- WC = World Cup
- CT = Champions Trophy
- EC = European Championships

=== Women's internationals ===
Extended content

Player	Events	Notes/Ref
(England) Charlotte Craddock		
(England) Sabbie Heesh		
(England) Hollie Pearne-Webb		
(England) Georgie Twigg		

Key

- Oly = Olympic Games
- CG = Commonwealth Games
- WC = World Cup
- CT = Champions Trophy
- EC = European Championships
