= Women's England Hockey League =

English field hockey league structure

- Current season, competition or edition: 2024–25 Women's England Hockey League season
- Sport: Field hockey
- Founded: 1989; 37 years ago
- First season: 1989–90
- Administrator: England Hockey
- No. of teams: 12 (Premier Division); 10 (Division 1 South); 10 (Division 1 North); 30 (Conference teams)
- Country: England
- Confederation: EHF (Europe)
- Most recent champion: Reading (3rd title) (2025–26)
- Most titles: Slough (11 titles)
- Domestic cup: England Hockey Women's Championship Cup
- International cup: Women's Euro Hockey League
- Website: Women's Hockey League

The Women's England Hockey League is a field hockey league organised by England Hockey that features women's teams from England. From 2011–2020 it was sponsored by Investec and was referred to as the Investec Women's Hockey League.

== Format ==
=== Regular season ===
There are 62 teams in the league, the top tier consists of a Premier Division of 12 teams. Below this is tier two, which consists of two ten team Division One regional teams (North and South). The third tier consists of three regional conferences North, West, and East, all consisting of ten teams. The teams play each other home and away during an 18 week season from September to April. The league has a winter break between December and February. At the end of the season there are a series of play-offs that decide which teams are promoted and relegated and which team finish as champions. The winners of the Premier Division regular season automatically qualify to play in the EuroHockey Club Champions Cup.

=== League finals weekend ===
The top four Premier Division teams from the regular season qualify for the League Finals Weekend. The team that wins this tournament will be overall champions of the Women's England Hockey League and will qualify to play in the EuroHockey Club Champions Cup. If the team finishing top of the Premier Division at the end of the regular season also wins the League Finals Weekend tournament, the tournament runners-up will qualify as England's second team in the EuroHockey Club Champions Cup.

== Past winners ==
The Women's National League was introduced for the first time in 1989–90. and the inaugural Women's National League title sponsored by Typhoo was won by Slough.

=== Premier Division ===
Season	Champions	Runners-up
1989–90	Slough (1)	Leicester
1990–91	Slough (2)	Leicester
1991–92	Slough (3)	Leicester
1992–93	Ipswich (1)	Hightown
1993–94	Leicester (1)	Ipswich
1994–95	Slough (4)	Hightown
1995–96	Hightown (1)	Ipswich
1996–97	Slough (5)	Ipswich
1997–98	Slough (6)	Clifton
1998–99	Slough (7)	Ipswich
1999–2000	Hightown (2)	Ipswich
2000–01	Leicester (2)	Ipswich
2001–02	Slough (8)	Olton & West Warwicks
2002–03	Slough (9)	Canterbury
2003–04	Hightown (3)	Chelmsford
2004–05	Leicester (3)	Ipswich
2005–06	Leicester (4)	Canterbury
2006–07	Leicester (5)	Slough
2007–08	Slough (10)	Bowdon Hightown
2008–09	Bowdon Hightown (4)	Olton & West Warwicks
2009–10	Slough (11)	Leicester
2010–11	Reading (1)	Leicester
2011–12	Leicester (6)	Reading
2012–13	Reading (2)	Leicester
2013–14	Surbiton (1)	Canterbury
2014–15	Surbiton (2)	Canterbury
2015–16	Surbiton (3)	Canterbury
2016–17	Surbiton (4)	Holcombe
2017–18	Surbiton (5)	Holcombe
2018–19	Surbiton (6)	Holcombe
2019–20	Surbiton (7)	East Grinstead
2020–21	Cancelled due to COVID-19	
2021–22	Surbiton (8)	Hampstead & Westminster
2022–23	East Grinstead (1)	Surbiton
2023–24	Surbiton (9)	Hampstead & Westminster
2024–25	Reading (3)	Surbiton

=== Premiership Tournament/Super Cup ===
Season	Champions	Runners-up
1998–99	Slough	Clifton
1999–2000	Hightown	Ipswich
2000–01	Slough	Ipswich
2001–02	Olton & West Warwicks	Slough
2002–03	Slough	Canterbury
2003–04	Hightown	Chelmsford
2004–05	Canterbury	Leicester
2005–06	Leicester	Canterbury

== Champions ==
=== By club ===
Club	Champion	Runners-up	Winning seasons
Slough	11	1	1989–90, 1990–91, 1991–92, 1994–95, 1996–97, 1997–98, 1998–99, 2001–02, 2002–03, 2007–08, 2009–10
Surbiton	9	2	2013–14, 2014–15, 2015–16, 2016–17, 2017–18, 2018–19, 2019–20, 2021–22, 2023–24
Leicester	6	6	1992–93, 2000–01, 2004–05, 2005–06, 2006–07, 2011–12
Hightown/Bowdon Hightown	4	3	1995–96, 1999–2000, 2003–04, 2008–09
Reading	3	1	2010–11, 2012–13, 2024–25
Ipswich	1	7	1992–93
East Grinstead	1	1	2022–23
Canterbury	0	5	
Holcombe	0	3	
Olton & West Warwicks	0	2	
Hampstead & Westminster	0	2	
Clifton	0	1	
Chelmsford	0	1	

== See also ==
- England Hockey Women's Championship Cup
- Men's England Hockey League
- England Hockey Men's Championship Cup
