= Lee Valley Hockey and Tennis Centre =

International field hockey venue

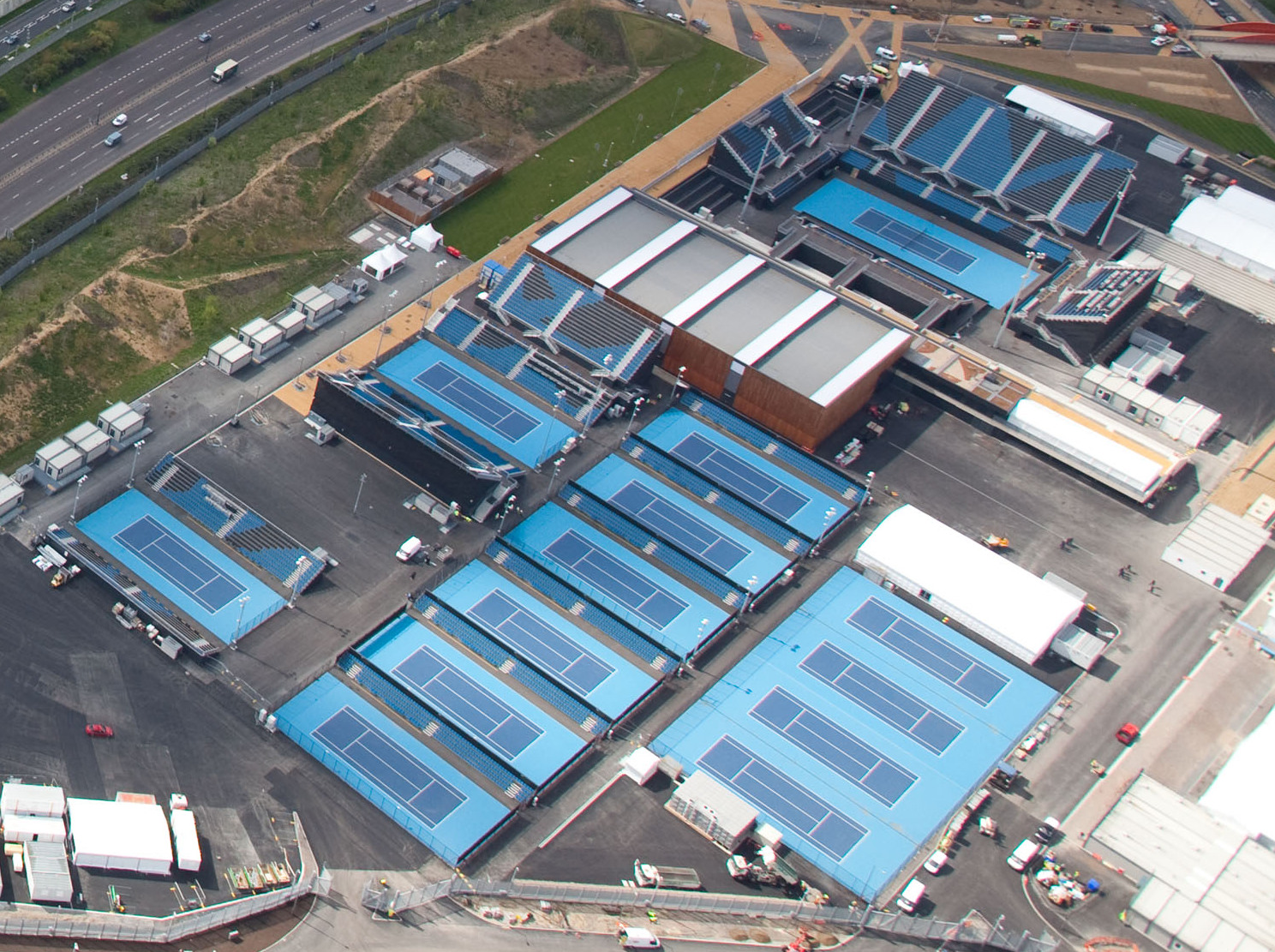
- Eton Manor in April 2012
- Interactive map of Lee Valley Hockey and Tennis Centre
- Former names: Eton Manor
- Location: Leyton, London Borough of Waltham Forest
- Coordinates: 51.55305°N 0.01513°W
- Owner: Lee Valley Regional Park Authority
- Operator: Great Britain Hockey; England Hockey
- Seating type: All-seater
- Capacity: 15,000
- Surface: Synthetic
- Record attendance: 15,000

Construction
- Opened: 2012
- Years active: 2012–
- Cost: £30 million

Lee Valley Hockey and Tennis Centre is a sports and leisure venue located in Leyton, London Borough of Waltham Forest, to the north of Queen Elizabeth Olympic Park. It is regularly used for international field hockey fixtures by both the Great Britain men's and women's field hockey teams. It hosted the 2018 Women's Hockey World Cup. Owned and managed by Lee Valley Regional Park Authority, the site was previously known as Eton Manor and was a wheelchair tennis venue for the 2012 Summer Paralympics before being converted for public use and reopening in June 2014.

== History ==
=== Eton Manor ===
The site was originally known as Eton Manor, the name taken from Eton College, which from the 1880s had run a "mission" to raise living standards in the East End of London. In 1909, four Old Etonian philanthropists founded Eton Manor Boys' Club to provide sporting facilities in the Hackney area, purchasing the former Manor Farm in 1913. In 1920, an old rubbish tip site was converted into the club's new sports ground, known as The Wilderness. Facilities included nine football pitches, two rugby pitches, cricket pitches, six tennis courts, a bowling green, a squash court and a running track. Eton Manor Boys' Club closed in 1967, and the club ground fell into disuse in 2001 before being selected for use during the 2012 Olympic Games. The charitable trust set up in 1924 to run and support Eton Manor Boys' Club still continues with different aims and a new name, Villiers Park Educational Trust.

Four sports clubs originating from Eton's "mission" are still in existence:

- Eton Manor RFC, now playing at The New Wilderness ground in Wanstead
- Eton Manor FC, now groundshare and are playing their matches at Waltham Abbey's ground in Waltham Abbey
- Eton Manor A.C., meeting at Waltham Forest Track and Pool in Walthamstow (young athletes) and The Cottage, Marsh Lane, in Leyton (senior athletes)
- Eastern Otters Water Polo Club (formerly Eton Otters) who currently play at the new Becontree Heath Leisure Centre in Dagenham (www.eastenotters.co.uk)

Eton College has a second connection to the 2012 Olympic Games, as the rowing events were held at the college's private facility, Dorney Lake.

=== London 2012 Olympic and Paralympic Games ===
During the London 2012 Olympic and Paralympic Games, Eton Manor was the only purpose-built Paralympic venue. It hosted the wheelchair tennis. The venue comprised nine competition courts and four warm-up courts. There were a total of 10,500 seats for spectators, with a 5,000 capacity centre court. The 27-acre site also housed temporary training pools for participants in aquatics events, including three 50m pools for swimmers and smaller pools for synchronised swimmers and water polo competitors.

Before the Games, Poet Laureate Carol Ann Duffy was commissioned to write a poem about Eton Manor to celebrate its history and legacy. The poem is inscribed on a brass plaque at the entrance to the venue and was part of the Winning Words initiative, a national poetry scheme inspired by London 2012 which integrated permanent and temporary poetry on Queen Elizabeth Olympic Park.

=== Post-Olympics ===
After the Olympic Games, Eton Manor housed the scaled down Olympic Hockey Centre which was relocated from Riverside Arena. The venue was made public following a £30 million conversion and was renamed Lee Valley Hockey and Tennis Centre. Run by the Lee Valley Regional Park Authority, it has two hockey pitches and ten tennis courts four indoor and six outdoor. The venue offers a range of events and programmes from grassroots to elite level.

In December 2012, the International Tennis Federation announced that the venue would stage the NEC Wheelchair Tennis Masters, an annual event, on its indoor courts.

== International field hockey ==
Since 2014, Lee Valley has staged a number of major international events, most notably the 2018 Women's Hockey World Cup, which was the 14th edition of the tournament. It also hosted the 2016 Women's Hockey Champions Trophy and the 2016 Men's Hockey Champions Trophy. From 2019, it has been the home venue of both the Great Britain women's and men's field hockey teams for their home matches in the Women's FIH Pro League and Men's FIH Pro League, most recently in May and June 2022 for the 2021–22 Women's FIH Pro League and the 2021–22 Men's FIH Pro League. The women's team played its first Pro League match at Lee Valley against the United States on 27 April 2019. For major hockey events, the stadium capacity is increased from the default 3,000 to 15,000 all seated.
