= Holcombe Hockey Club =

Field hockey club in the United Kingdom

- Nickname: The Incredible Holcs
- Founded: 1999; 27 years ago
- Ground: Holcombe Park
- Capacity: 1,000
- Chairman: Brian Field
- Manager: Chris Haigh
- League: Men's England Hockey League; Women's England Hockey League
- Website: https://holcombehc.org.uk/

Holcombe Hockey Club is a field hockey club based in Rochester, Kent, England. The home ground is located at Holcombe Park, where there is a water-based pitch, a sand-based pitch and a clubhouse. The club was formed in 1999/2000 from a merger of clubs in the area.

== Teams ==
The Men's 1st XI play in the Men's England Hockey League, and the Ladies 1st Team play in the Women's England Hockey League. The club is one of the largest in the UK, with ten Open/men's sides, six women’s sides, and various other sides.

== History ==
For three consecutive years from 2017 to 2019, the women's team finished runner up for the league title. On each occasion they were beaten by Surbiton.

In 2023, the men's first XI reached the play off final, finishing second in the English league, which was their best result in their history to date and therefore qualifying for the 2023–24 Men's Euro Hockey League.

== Squads ==
=== Men's First Team Squad 2025–26 season ===
- 1. Dom Dixon (goalkeeper)
- 2. Sam Taylor (captain)
- 4. Rohan Bhuhi
- 6. Michael Royden-Turner
- 8. Tom Moorhouse
- 9. Alexander Chihota
- 10. Jake Owen
- 12. Alex Pendle
- 13. Thomas Russell
- 14. Ali Douglas
- 15. Simon Yorston
- 18. Teague Marcano
- 19. Mohamed Mea
- 20. Ellis Robson
- 21. Mubashar Ali
- 77. Matthew Ramshaw

== Notable players ==
=== Men's internationals ===
Extended content

Player	Events/Notes	/Ref
(England) / (Republic of Ireland) David Ames	Oly (2020, 2024), WC (2018, 2023), EC 2023	
(England) Nick Bandurak	CG (2022), WC (2023), EC 2023	
(South Africa) Gareth Carr		
(England) Nicholas Catlin	Oly (2016), CG (2014)	
(Scotland) Dan Coultas	CG (2014), EC (2015)	
(South Africa) Denzil Dolley		
(Scotland) Ali Douglas	EC (2025)	
(Scotland) Rob Field	CG (2022)	
(England) Dan Fox	Oly (2016), CG (2014), WC (2014)	
(Wales) Rhodri Furlong	WC (2023), EC (2023)	
(England) Danny Hall		
(England) Ashley Jackson	Oly (2016)	
(England) / (Republic of Ireland) Iain Lewers	Oly (2016), CG (2014)	
(England) David Mathews		
(England) Barry Middleton	Oly (2016), CG (2014, 2018), WC (2014, 2018)	
(England) Ollie Payne	Oly (2020, 2024), CG (2022), WC (2023), EC 2023	
(New Zealand) Hayden Phillips	Oly (2024)	
(England) George Pinner	Oly (2016), CG (2018), WC (2018)	
(England) Matthew Ramshaw		
(South Africa) Ryan Ravenscroft		
(England) Phil Roper	Oly (2024), CG (2022), WC (2023), EC 2023	
(England) Sam Taylor	debut 2022	
(Brazil) Stéphane Vehrle-Smith	Oly (2016)	
(England) Samuel Ward	Oly (2016)	

Key

- Oly = Olympic Games
- CG = Commonwealth Games
- WC = World Cup
- CT = Champions Trophy
- EC = European Championships

=== Women's internationals ===
Extended content

Player	Events	Notes/Ref
(South Africa) Dirkie Chamberlain		
(Republic of Ireland) Nicola Daly		
(England) Steph Elliott		
(Republic of Ireland) Megan Frazer		
(England) Maddie Hinch		
(Wales) Sarah Jones		
(England) Shona McCallin		
(Scotland) Emily Maguire		
(England) Sam Quek		
(Scotland) Sarah Robertson		
(Wales) Rose Thomas		
(England) Laura Unsworth		
(England) Ellie Watton		
(England) Nicola White		
(England) Lucy Wood		

Key

- Oly = Olympic Games
- CG = Commonwealth Games
- WC = World Cup
- CT = Champions Trophy
- EC = European Championships
