= Brooklands Hockey Club =

British field hockey club

Brooklands MU (men) Brooklands Poynton (women)
- League: Men's England Hockey League; Women's England Hockey League
- Founded: 2002; 23 years ago (men); 2009; 16 years ago (women)
- Website: https://www.brooklandshockey.co.uk/

Brooklands Hockey Club also known as Brooklands MU (men) and Brooklands Poynton (women) is a field hockey club that is based at the Brooklands Sports Club at Georges Road in Sale, Cheshire.

The club runs seven men's teams (six senior and one veterans) and four women's teams, four junior teams and three mini teams. The men's first XI play in the Men's England Hockey League and the women's first XI play in the Women's England Hockey League.

== History ==
Originally a cricket club on land owned by the Brooks family the hockey element arrived in 1889. Brooklands Hockey Club merged with the Manchester University hockey team in 2002 and the ladies section of the club merged with the Poynton Ladies Club in 2009.

== Players ==
=== Men's First Team Squad 2025–26 season ===
- 1. Tom Marshall (goalkeeper)
- 2. Jaxon Browne
- 3. Daniel Vincent
- 4. Ben Wallace
- 5. Luis Cuttle
- 6. James Sutcliffe
- 8. Samkelo Mvimbi
- 9. Andrew Rusbridge
- 11. Carlon Mentoor
- 13. Michael Parham
- 16. Peter Flanagan (captain)
- 17. Freddie Davies
- 18. James Lavers
- 19. Joshua Lang
- 20. Inaki Fernandez
- 23. Aidan Khares
- x. Josh Baxendell

== Major honours ==
- 2013–14 Men's Cup Runner Up

== Notable players ==
=== Men's internationals ===
Extended content

Player	Events/Notes	Ref
(Scotland) Russell Anderson	2012–2013 & 2018–2021	
(Scotland) Craig Falconer	Nations Cup (2025)	
(England) Andy Bull	CT (2010)	
(England) Martyn Grimley	WC (1986)	
(Wales) James Ogden	CG (2002)	
(England) Phil Roper		
(England) Ian David Taylor	Oly (1960)	

Key

- Oly = Olympic Games
- CG = Commonwealth Games
- WC = World Cup
- CT = Champions Trophy
- EC = European Championships
