= Leicester City Hockey Club =

Field hockey club in Great Britain

- Full name: Leicester City Hockey Club
- League: Women's England Hockey League; Midland Regional Hockey Association
- Founded: 1894
- Home ground: St. Margaret's Pastures, Leicester
- Website: www.leicesterhc.co.uk
Home	Away

Leicester City Hockey Club is a field hockey club based in Leicester, England, who play their home games at St. Margaret's Pastures. The ladies side has produced a number of international players and is recognised as one of the most successful clubs in England having won six league titles.

== Teams ==
The ladies team was established in 1894 and the men's section was launched in 2018.

The club currently fields five ladies teams, two men's teams and various youth teams.

The ladies 1st XI play in the Women's England Hockey League. The men's teams, and the remainder of the ladies teams, play in the Midlands League.

== The Academy ==
Leicester City Hockey Club launched their junior academy with training, matches and tournaments for players aged 6-18. Young players are encouraged to take qualifications in coaching and umpiring.

== Honours ==
- Women's England Hockey League
  - Winners: 1993–94, 2000–01, 2004–05, 2005–06, 2006–07, 2011–12: 6
- Women's National Cup
  - Winners: 1992–93, 2004–05, 2007–08, 2009–10: 4
- Women's Super Cup
  - Winners: 2005–06
- EuroHockey Club Champions Trophy
  - Winners: 2014

== Notable players ==
=== Women's internationals ===
- (England) Kirsty Bowden
- (England) Crista Cullen
- (England) Sabbie Heesh
- (England) Rebecca Herbert
- (England) Maddie Hinch
- (England) Jo Hunter
- (England) Kath Johnson
- (England) Kathryn Lane
- (England) Katie Long
- (England) Hannah Macleod
- (England) Joanne Mould
- (England) Mary Nevill
- (England) Anne Panter
- (New Zealand) Liz Perry
- (England) Helen Richardson-Walsh
- (England) Chloe Rogers
- (England) Laura Unsworth
- (England) Nicola White
