= Buckingham Hockey Club =

British field hockey club

- League: Women's England Hockey League; Men's Middx, Berks, Bucks & Oxon League
- Home ground: Stowe School; Akeley Wood School

Buckingham Hockey Club is a field hockey club based at Stowe School near Buckingham. The club also play fixtures at Akeley Wood School in Buckingham and Buckingham Town Cricket Club.

The club has 3 Ladies Teams, 2 Mens Teams and an active Junior section. In the 2025/2026 season the Ladies 1st XI, Mens 1st XI and Mens 2nd XI all topped their leagues securing promotion for the 2026/2027 season.

The Women's 1st Team play in the Investec Women's Hockey League Premier Division and the Men's teams play in the South Central Hockey Leagues (Middx, Berks, Bucks & Oxon).

== Players ==
=== Women's First Team Squad 2022-2023 season ===
Note: Flags indicate national team as defined under FIFA eligibility rules; some limited exceptions apply. Players may hold more than one non-FIFA nationality.

No.	Pos.	Nation	Player
1	GK	ENG	Nicole Marks
2	DF	ENG	Zoe Shipperley (captain)
3	FW	ENG	Abbie Brant
4	MF	ENG	Kitty Higgins
5	DF	WAL	Megan Lewis-Williams
—	DF	ENG	Deborah James
6	FW	ENG	Jo Hunter
7	MF	ENG	Emma O'Nien
8	DF	ENG	Lyndsey White
9	DF	ENG	Frankie Scott
10	MF	ENG	Lottie Porter
11	MF	ENG	Maddy Newlyn
13	MF	WAL	Alex Naughalty
14	MF	ENG	Katrina Nicholson
15	DF	ENG	Lauren Thomas

No.	Pos.	Nation	Player
16	FW	ENG	Jaz Needham
17	DF	USA	Carter Ayars
18	MF	ENG	Kirsty Freshwater
19	FW	ENG	Natasha James
22	DF	ENG	Rebecca Van Arrowsmith

=== Men's First Team Squad ===
Note: Flags indicate national team as defined under FIFA eligibility rules; some limited exceptions apply. Players may hold more than one non-FIFA nationality.

No.	Pos.	Nation	Player
1	GK	ENG	Matt Hunter
2	MF	ENG	Ben Scott
5	FW	ENG	James Trumper
7	DF	ENG	Jack Boyden
10	DF	ENG	Ash Sherwood
11	FW	ENG	Phil Arnold
16	MF	ENG	Andy Pynegar
18	FW	RSA	Keegan Gregory
22	FW	ENG	George Wood
24	DF	ENG	Jason Thelwell
30	MF	ENG	Harry Rose

No.	Pos.	Nation	Player
43	MF	ENG	Jonty Devine
26	MF	ENG	Georges Tasker
—	DF	ENG	Freddie Walker

== Major Honours ==
- 2015-16 Women's Cup Runner-Up
