= Canterbury Hockey Club =

Field hockey club from the United Kingdom

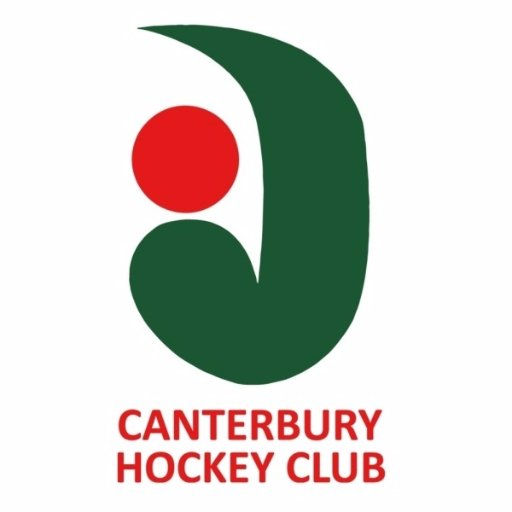
- Founded: 1901
- League: Men's England Hockey League; Women's England Hockey League
- Based in: Canterbury, Kent, England
- Home ground: Polo Farm
- Colours: Green and White (H), Red (A)
- Coaches: Craig Boyne, Mel Clewlow
- Captain: Tom Bean, Lucy Barnes

Canterbury Hockey Club is a field hockey club based in Canterbury, England. The club was established in 1901 and the home ground is located just outside Canterbury at Polo Farm. There are two water-based pitches, a topped sand based pitch, purpose built Indoor Hockey Centre and a clubhouse.

The men's 1st XI play in the Men's England Hockey League and the ladies 1st XI play in the Women's England Hockey League. The large club fields ten men's sides, five ladies' sides, and various youth sides.

The men's team have been champions of England on one occasion (1999–2000) and the women's team have been runner-up five times.

== Teams ==
=== Men's ===
- 1st XI
- 2nd XI
- Pilgrims
- 3s
- 4s
- Millers
- 5s
- Griffins
- Squires
- Friars

=== Ladies ===
- 1st XI
- 2s
- 2As
- 3s
- 3As

=== Juniors ===
The club has a large number of junior teams from U18s to U8s. These teams represent the club in various competitions across Kent and the rest of the country.

== Major honours ==
- 1999–00 Men's League Champions
- 2002–03 Women's Cup Winners
- 2004-05 Women's Super Cup Winners
- 2006-07 Men's Premier Indoor Champions
- Five times Women's League Runner-Up & 1998 Men's League Runner-up
- 2016-17 Men's Cup Runner-up

== Notable players ==
=== Men's internationals ===
Extended content

Player	Events/Notes	/Ref
(Scotland) Wei Adams		
(Australia) Craig Boyne		
(England) David Hacker	Oly (2000)	
(Trinidad and Tobago) Kwan Browne		
(England) Sean Kerly	Oly (1992)	
(England) David Mathews	CG (2002), WC (2002)	
(Trinidad and Tobago) Mickel Pierre		
(Australia) Josh Pollard		

Key

- Oly = Olympic Games
- CG = Commonwealth Games
- WC = World Cup
- CT = Champions Trophy
- EC = European Championships

=== Women's internationals ===
Extended content

Player	Events/Notes	Ref
(England) Grace Balsdon		
(Scotland) Mel Clewlow		
(Wales) Nikki Kidd		
(England) Lizzie Neal		
(England) Susannah Townsend		
(South Africa) Jennifer Wilson		

Key

- Oly = Olympic Games
- CG = Commonwealth Games
- WC = World Cup
- CT = Champions Trophy
- EC = European Championships
