= England Hockey Women's Championship Cup =

Field hockey cup competition

- First season: 1977–78
- Folded: 2025
- Administrator: England Hockey
- Country: England
- Lastchampion: Beeston
- Most titles: Hightown/Bowdon Hightown (9 titles)
- Website: England Hockey Championships

The England Hockey Women's Championship Cup was a field hockey cup competition organised by England Hockey that features women's teams from England. The competition was initially known as the Women's National Clubs Championship. The Chelsea College of Physical Education (Eastbourne) won the inaugural competition in 1977–78. It has also been known as the All England Women's Hockey Association Cup, the EHA Cup and the EH Women's Cup. During the 2010s, it was sponsored by Investec and was known as the Investec Women's Cup.

In 2025 the event which included Premier division teams was discontinued in favour of a lower tier events.

== Finals ==
=== Women's National Clubs Championship ===
Season	Winners	Score	Runners Up	Venue
1977–78	Chelsea CPE	1–0	Prestwich	Liverpool
1978–79	Chelmsford	3–0	Leicester	Bedford
1979–80	Norton	2–1	Chelmsford	University of East Anglia
1980–81	Sutton Coldfield	1–1 (4–2p)	Hightown	Cheltenham Ladies' College
1981–82	Slough	3–2	Sheffield League	Durham
1982–83	Slough	2–0	Chelmsford	Luton
1983–84	Sheffield	0–0 (4–2p)	Hightown	Cheltenham
1984–85	Ipswich	2–1	Slough	Pressed Steel Fisher Ground, Oxford
1985–86	Slough	1–1 (5–3p)	Ealing	University of Essex
1986–87	Ealing	1–0	Ipswich	Sheffield
1987–88	Ealing	1–0	Hightown	Coventry School, Coundon
1988–89	Ealing	1–0	Sutton Coldfield	Southampton
1989–90	Sutton Coldfield	1–0	Hightown	Bournemouth Sports Centre
1990–91	Sutton Coldfield	1–1 (4–3p)	Leicester	Ashford

=== AEWHA Cup ===
Season	Winners	Score	Runners Up	Venue
1991–92	Hightown	3–3 (3–2p)	Slough	Milton Keynes
1992–93	Leicester	1–0	Ealing	Milton Keynes
1993–94	Slough	1–1 (4–2p)	Hightown	Milton Keynes
1994–95	Hightown	5–0	Trojans	Milton Keynes
1995–96	Ipswich	0–0 (3–0p)	Clifton	Milton Keynes
1996–97	Hightown	2–2 (3–2p)	Clifton	Milton Keynes
1997–98	Clifton	1–1 (5–4p)	Slough	Milton Keynes
1998–99	Slough	4–3	Leicester	Milton Keynes

=== EHA Cup ===
Season	Winners	Score	Runners Up	Venue
1999–00	Clifton	4–2	Sutton Coldfield	Milton Keynes
2000–01	Slough	3–2	Olton & West Warwicks	Milton Keynes
2001–02	Ipswich	3–2	Olton & West Warwicks	Milton Keynes
2002–03	Canterbury	4–0	Slough	Canterbury
2003–04	Hightown	3–2	Leicester	Cannock
2004–05	Leicester	2–0	Clifton	Canterbury

=== EH Women's Cup ===
Season	Winners	Score	Runners Up	Venue
2005–06	Bowdon Hightown	5–0	Chelmsford	Reading
2006–07	Bowdon Hightown	2–0	Slough	Reading
2007–08	Leicester	1–0	Slough	Highfields Sports Club, Nottingham
2008–09	Bowdon Hightown	2–1	Reading	Highfields Sports Club, Nottingham
2009–10	Leicester	2–1	Reading	Highfields Sports Club, Nottingham
2010–11	Bowdon Hightown	4–1	Surbiton	Cannock

=== Investec Women's Cup ===
Season	Winners	Score	Runners Up	Venue
2011–12	University of Birmingham	4–1	Surbiton	Cannock
2012–13	Bowdon Hightown	2–1	Clifton	Beeston
2013–14	Surbiton	7–1	Hampstead & Westminster	Highfields Sports Club, Nottingham
2014–15	Surbiton	3–2	Clifton	Lee Valley
2015–16	Clifton	1–0	Buckingham	Lee Valley
2016–17	Surbiton	5–0	Clifton Robinsons	Lee Valley

=== EH Women's Championship Cup ===
Season	Winners	Score	Runners Up	Venue
2017–18	Surbiton	5–0	Clifton Robinsons	Lee Valley
2018–19	Clifton Robinsons	2-2 (3-1p)	Hampstead & Westminster	Lee Valley
2019–20	Beeston	3-2 (Note: Final not held until 5 Sep due to COVID-19.)	Clifton Robinsons	Nottingham Hockey Centre
2020–21	East Grinstead	5-3	Clifton Robinsons	Nottingham Hockey Centre
2021–22	Beeston	3–1	Buckingham	Lee Valley
2022–23	Beeston	4–2	Guildford	Lee Valley
2023–24	Beeston	2–1	Holcombe	Lee Valley
2024–25	Not completed			

DISCONTINUED

== See also ==
- Women's England Hockey League
- England Hockey Men's Championship Cup
- Men's England Hockey League
