= 1981–82 in English field hockey =

1981–82 in English field hockey . The principal event for men was the National Inter League Championship, which brought together the winners of their respective regional leagues. The Men's championship was won by Slough

The Men's Cup was won by Southgate and the Women's Cup was won by Slough.

== Men's Truman National Inter League Championship ==
(Held at Eastcote, April 24–25)

=== Group A ===
Team 1	Team 2	Score
East Grinstead	Isca	0-5
Neston	Slough	1-1
Slough	Isca	3-1
East Grinstead	Neston	0-3
Slough	East Grinstead	7-0
Isca	Neston	0-1

Pos	Team	P	W	D	L	F	A	Pts
1	Slough	3	2	1	0	11	2	5
2	Neston	3	2	1	0	5	1	5
3	Isca	3	1	0	2	6	4	2
4	East Grinstead	3	0	0	3	0	15	0

=== Group B ===
Team 1	Team 2	Score
Bournville	Cambridge City	1-3
Sheffield	Trojans	2-2
Cambridge City	Trojans	0-0
Bournville	Sheffield	2-2
Trojans	Bournville	0-2
Sheffield	Cambridge City	1-1

Pos	Team	P	W	D	L	F	A	Pts
1	Cambridge City	3	2	1	0	4	2	5
2	Bournville	3	1	1	1	5	5	4
3	Sheffield	3	0	3	0	5	5	3
3	Westcliff	3	0	2	1	2	4	2

= Qualified for final

=== Final ===
Team 1	Team 2	Score
Slough	Cambridge City	8-0

Slough
Ian Taylor, Paul Barber, Steve Partington, Manjit Flora (Badar Butt sub), Brajinder Daved, John Allen (A Radnedge sub), Ken Partington, Suti Khehar, Bal Saini, Ravinder Laly, Kuki Dhak
Cambridge City
I Haugh, J Maxey, N Muncey, R Pearson, R Whitworth, S Graves, M Saggers, P Spiers, N Verma, P White, J Wilkenson (T Greaves sub)

== Men's Cup (Rank Xerox National Clubs Championship) ==
=== Quarter-finals ===
Team 1	Team 2	Score
Southgate	Fareham	4-0
Slough	Bromley	6-0
Hounslow	Richmond	3-0
Nottingham	Bishops Stortford	3-2 aet

=== Semi-finals ===
Team 1	Team 2	Score
Southgate	Hounslow	1-0
Slough	Nottingham	4-0

=== Final ===
(Mar 28, Walker Memorial Ground, Southgate)

Team 1	Team 2	Score
Southgate	Slough	2-1

Southgate
David Owen (gk), James Duthie, Mike Spray, David Craig, Ian McGinn, M Driver, Richard Dodds, Sean Kerly, Steve Batchelor, David Thomas, Andrew Western
Slough
Ian Taylor (gk), Paul Barber, Mike Parris (Harjinder Singh Dhami sub), Manjit Flora, Brajinder Daved, John Allen, Bhaji Flora, Suti Khehar, Bal Saini, Ravinder Laly, Kuki Dhak

== Women's Cup (National Clubs Championship) ==
(Durham, April 17–18)

=== Group A ===
Team 1	Team 2	Score
Slough	Chelmsford	1-1
Sutton Coldfield	Slough	1-1
Sutton Coldfield	Chelmsford	0-0
Chelmsford	Sheffield League	0-2
Slough	Wimborne	3-1
Wimborne	Sheffield League	0-1
Wimborne	Sutton Coldfield	1-5
Sheffield League	Slough	2-0
Sheffield League	Sutton Coldfield	2-0
Chelmsford	Wimborne	5-0

Pos	Team	P	W	D	L	F	A	Pts
1	Sheffield League	4	4	0	0	7	0	8
2	Slough	4	1	2	1	5	5	4
3	Chelmsford	4	1	2	1	6	3	4
4	Sutton Coldfield	4	1	2	1	6	4	4
5	Wimborne	4	0	0	4	2	14	0

=== Group B ===
Team 1	Team 2	Score
Hightown	Ealing	0-2
Truro	Ipswich	0-3
Ipswich	Northampton	2-1
Truro	Ealing	0-4
Northampton	Hightown	0-2
Hightown	Ipswich	1-0
Truro	Northampton	1-0
Ipswich	Ealing	0-3
Truro	Hightown	0-1
Ealing	Northampton	3-1

Pos	Team	P	W	D	L	F	A	Pts
1	Ealing	4	4	0	0	12	1	8
2	Hightown	4	3	0	1	4	2	6
3	Ipswich	4	2	0	2	5	5	4
4	Truro	4	1	0	2	1	8	2
5	Northampton	4	0	0	4	2	8	0

= Qualified for final

=== Semi-finals ===
Team 1	Team 2	Score
Sheffield League	Hightown	3-1
Slough	Ealing	1-1*

*Slough won on penalty strokes

=== Final ===
Team 1	Team 2	Score
Slough	Sheffield League	3-2
