= 1984–85 England Hockey League season =

English field hockey season

1984–85 England Hockey League

The 1984–85 English Hockey League season took place from September 1984 until May 1985.

The season culminated in the National Inter League Championship for men which brought together the winners of their respective regions. The Men's championship was won by East Grinstead.

The Men's Cup (National Clubs Championships/Hockey Association Cup) was won by Southgate and the Women's Cup (National Clubs Championship) was won by Ipswich.

== Men's National Inter League Championship finals ==
(Held at Prescot Leisure Centre, Prescot, Merseyside, May 4–5)

=== Pool A ===
| Team 1 | Team 2 | Score |
|---|---|---|
| Slough | Isca | 3-0 |
| Slough | Cambridge City | 5-1 |
| Cambridge City | Isca | 0-4 |

| Pos | Team | P | W | D | L | F | A | Pts |
|---|---|---|---|---|---|---|---|---|
| 1 | Slough | 2 | 2 | 0 | 0 | 8 | 1 | 6 |
| 2 | Isca | 2 | 1 | 0 | 1 | 4 | 3 | 3 |
| 3 | Cambridge City | 2 | 0 | 0 | 2 | 1 | 9 | 0 |

=== Pool B ===
| Team 1 | Team 2 | Score |
|---|---|---|
| Neston | Olton & West Warwicks | 5-0 |
| Olton & West Warwicks | East Grinstead | 0-3 |
| East Grinstead | Neston | 2-0 |

| Pos | Team | P | W | D | L | F | A | Pts |
|---|---|---|---|---|---|---|---|---|
| 1 | East Grinstead | 2 | 2 | 0 | 0 | 5 | 0 | 6 |
| 2 | Neston | 2 | 1 | 0 | 1 | 2 | 5 | 3 |
| 3 | Olton & West Warwicks | 2 | 0 | 0 | 2 | 0 | 8 | 0 |

| = Qualified for semi-finals |

=== Semi-finals & Final ===
| Round | Team 1 | Team 2 | Score |
|---|---|---|---|
| Semi-final | East Grinstead | Isca | 2-1 |
| Semi-final | Slough | Neston | 3-1 |
| Final | East Grinstead | Slough | 2-1 |

East Grinstead
Ian Taylor, David Payne, William Bartlett, Simon Cole, Neil Longstreet (Simon Whalley sub), G Lee, Gerry Mott, James Leman, Peter Head, Richard Leman (capt), Bram van Asselt, Andrew Bass
Slough
Paul Loudon, Paul Barber (capt), D Knott, Manjit Flora, Suti Khehar, Kartar Davatwal, Ken Partington, Bhaji Flora, Chris Maskery, Ravinder Laly, Kuki Dhak (Kalli Saini sub)

== Men's Cup (National Clubs Championship/Hockey Association Cup) ==
=== Quarter-finals ===
| Team 1 | Team 2 | Score |
|---|---|---|
| Hounslow | Edgbaston | 10-0 |
| Teddington | Southgate | 1-2 |
| Trojans | Pickwick | 0-0 Pickwick pens |
| Blackheath | Slough | 1-0 |

=== Semi-finals ===
| Team 1 | Team 2 | Score |
|---|---|---|
| Hounslow | Southgate | 0-1 |
| Blackheath | Pickwick | 2-0 |

=== Final ===
(Held at Willesden Sports Centre on 19 May)

| Team 1 | Team 2 | Score |
|---|---|---|
| Southgate | Blackheath | 2-1 |

Southgate
David Owen, David Craig, James Duthie, Mike Spray, Richard Dodds, A Wallace (capt), Steve Batchelor (Ian Jennings sub), John Shaw, David Thomas (Nick Clark sub), Sean Kerly, Paul Moulton
Blackheath
Mohan Singh Kalsi, Harjinder Singh Dhami, Parminder Singh Kalsi, Brad Rehling, Brajinder Daved, Badar Butt, Albert De Souza, Peter Abreo, Wasim Butt (Neil Watson sub), Sheikh Imtiaz (capt), Nirman Singh Kalsi

== Women's Cup (National Club Championship finals) ==
(Held at the Pressed Steel Fisher Ground, Oxford, April 20–21)

=== Pool A ===
| Pos | Team |
|---|---|
| 1 | Sutton Coldfield |
| 2 | Chelmsford |
| 3 | Hightown |
| 4 | Portsmouth Civil Service |
| 5 | Clifton |

=== Pool B ===
| Pos | Team |
|---|---|
| 1 | Slough |
| 2 | Ipswich |
| 3 | Great Harwood |
| 4 | Wimborne |
| 5 | Bedford College |

| = Qualified for semi-finals |

=== Semi-finals & Final ===
| Round | Team 1 | Team 2 | Score |
|---|---|---|---|
| Semi-final | Ipswich | Sutton Coldfield | 1-0 |
| Semi-final | Slough | Chelmsford | 3-1 |
| Final | Ipswich | Slough | 2-1 |
