= 1977–78 in English field hockey =

English field hockey season

The 1977–78 in English field hockey.

The Men's Cup was won by Guildford and the inaugural Women's Cup was won by the Chelsea College of Physical Education (Eastbourne) Hockey Club.

The Men's National Inter League Championship, sponsored by Truman's Brewery, brought together the winners of their respective regional leagues. The championship (held in September 1978) was won by Southgate.

As from the 1980–81 season the National Inter League Championship would be held in the spring of the same season instead of the Autumn of the following season.

== Men's National Inter League Championship ==
(Held at Officers' Club, Aldershot, September 23–24)

=== Group A ===
Team 1	Team 2	Score
Blueharts	St George's	1-1
Trojans	Isca	3-0
Trojans	Blueharts	0-0
Isca	St George's	2-0
Isca	Blueharts	1-1 Isca pens
Trojans	St George's	3-1

Pos	Team	P	W	D	L	F	A	Pts
1	Trojans	3	2	1	0	6	1	5
2	Isca	3	2	0	1	3	4	4
3	Blueharts	3	0	2	1	2	2	2
4	St George's	3	0	1	2	2	6	1

=== Group B ===
Team 1	Team 2	Score
Bournville	Liverpool Sefton	1-2
Indian Gymkhana	Southgate	1-4
Liverpool Sefton	Indian Gymkhana	1-4
Bournville	Southgate	1-5
Liverpool Sefton	Southgate	0-0
Bournville	Indian Gymkhana	3-0

Pos	Team	P	W	D	L	F	A	Pts
1	Southgate	3	2	0	1	9	2	4
2	Liverpool Sefton	3	1	1	1	3	5	3
3	Bournville	3	1	0	2	4	7	2
3	Indian Gymkhana	3	1	0	2	5	8	2

= Qualified for final

=== Final ===
Team 1	Team 2	Score
Southgate	Trojans	2-0

Southgate
David Owen (gk), Robert Cattrall, Nigel Woolven, Andy Wallace, Ian McGinn, Raj Rawal, Michael Corby, Alistair McGinn, Roly Brookeman, Jimmy Neale, Imtiaz Sheikh
Trojans
P Goss, D Legg, A Muller, G Kirkham, K Chambers, G Leach, J Isaacs, G Lucas, A Fernandes, Brian Purdy, B Hiscock

== Men's Cup (Rank Xerox National Clubs Championship) ==
Guildford won the Men's National Cup final, held at Guildford Hockey Club on 7 May.

=== Quarter-finals ===
Team 1	Team 2	Score
Bedfordshire Eagles	Neston	
Slough	Royal Army Pay Corps	
Guildford	Nottingham	
Ipswich	Isca	

=== Semi-finals ===
Team 1	Team 2	Score
Guildford	Ipswich	2-1
Slough	Bedfordshire Eagles	3-2

=== Final ===
Team 1	Team 2	Score
Guildford	Slough	2-1

Guildford
R Wright, I Carley, N Taylor, M Read (C Basey sub), Ian Pinks, M Perrin, N Marchington, P Pennock, A Jeans, C Cottrell, B Pett
Slough
Ian Taylor, Mike Parris, Manjit Flora, Andy Churcher, John Allen, John Murdock, Suti Khehar, Ken Partington (Pami Saini sub), Stuart Collins, Bal Saini, Masood Ahmad

== Women's Cup (National Clubs Championship) ==
Chelsea College of Physical Education HC won the Women's National Cup, held in Liverpool, on 9 April.

=== Final ===
Team 1	Team 1	Score
Chelsea College of Physical Education (Eastbourne)	Prestwich	1-0
