= 1980–81 in English field hockey =

English field hockey season

1980–81 in English field hockey. The principal event for men was the National Inter League Championship which brought together the winners of their respective regional leagues. The Men's championship was won by Slough

The Men's Cup was won by Slough and the Women's Cup was won by Sutton Coldfield.

== Men's Truman National Inter League Championship ==
(Held at Eastcote, April 25–26)

=== Group A ===
Team 1	Team 2	Score
Isca	St George's	0-0
Trojans	Westcliff	0-3
Westcliff	Isca	0-2
Trojans	St George's	2-0
Trojans	Isca	3-1
Westcliff	St George's	3-2

Pos	Team	P	W	D	L	F	A	Pts
1	Westcliff	3	2	0	1	6	4	4
2	Trojans	3	2	0	1	5	4	4
3	Isca	3	1	1	1	3	3	3
4	St George's	3	0	1	2	2	5	1

=== Group B ===
Team 1	Team 2	Score
Bowdon	Nottingham]	1-3
Slough	Old Williamsonians	3-1
Nottingham]	Old Williamsonians	
Bowdon	Slough	
Bowdon	Old Williamsonians	
Nottingham]	Slough	

Pos	Team	P	W	D	L	F	A	Pts
1	Slough	3						
2	Nottingham	3						
3	Bowdon	3						
3	Old Williamsonians	3						

= Qualified for final

=== Final ===
Team 1	Team 2	Score
Slough	Westcliff	3-0

Slough
Ian Taylor, Paul Barber, Manjit Flora, Andy Churcher (Steve Partington sub), John Allen, Suti Khehar, Brajinder Daved, Ken Partington (Bhaji Flora sub), Stuart Collins, Bal Saini, Kuki Dhak
Westcliff
A Christmas, R Holmes, P Wakeford, R Hilton, N Havens, P Anderson, N Boddington, T Copping, M Bond, J French, Ian Towler (L Bastow sub)

== Men's Cup (Rank Xerox National Clubs Championship) ==
=== Quarter-finals ===
Team 1	Team 2	Score
Southgate	St Albans	1-0
Slough	Guildford	3-0
Olton & West Warwicks	Bromley	2-1
Neston	Gloucester Club	5-0

=== Semi-finals ===
Team 1	Team 2	Score
Southgate	Olton & West Warwicks	5-1
Slough	Neston	4-1

=== Final ===
(Held at Guildford Hockey Club on 5 April)

Team 1	Team 2	Score
Slough	Southgate	2-1

Slough
Ian Taylor, Paul Barber, Manjit Flora, Andy Churcher, John Allen, Suti Khehar, Brajinder Daved, Ken Partington, Ravinder Laly, Bal Saini, Kuki Dhak
Southgate
David Owen, James Duthie, Mike Spray, David Craig, Andy Wallace, Alistair McGinn, M Driver, Roly Brookeman, Sean Kerly, Imtiaz Sheikh, Steve Batchelor

== Women's Cup (National Clubs Championship) ==
(Cheltenham Ladies' College Ground, April 11–12)

=== Participants ===
Group 1

Team 1
Sutton Coldfield (Winners)
Ipswich
Redland
Sheffield
Slough

Group 2

Team 1
Cambridge University
Chelsea College of Physical Education (Eastbourne)/Brighton Polytechnic
East Gloucester
Hightown
Leicester

=== Semi finals ===
Team 1	Team 1	Score
Sutton Coldfield		
Hightown	Ipswich	(3-2 penalties)

=== Final ===
Team 1	Team 1	Score	Scorers
Sutton Coldfield	Hightown	1-1 (4-2 penalties)	Jane Swinnerton/
