= 2008–09 England Hockey League season =

English field hockey season

2008–09 England Hockey League

The 2008–09 English Hockey League season took place from September 2008 until March 2009. The league was sponsored by Slazenger and the men's title was won by East Grinstead with the women's title going to Bowdon Hightown. There were no playoffs during the season.

The Men's Cup was won by Reading and the Women's Cup was won by Bowdon Hightown.

== Men's Slazenger Premier Division League Standings ==
Pos	Team	P	W	D	L	F	A	GD	Pts
1	East Grinstead	18	13	2	3	64	33	31	41
2	Reading	18	12	2	4	51	23	28	38
3	Beeston	18	11	4	3	54	35	19	37
4	Cannock	18	9	5	4	50	36	14	32
5	Surbiton	18	8	7	3	54	41	13	31
6	Loughborough Students	18	6	6	6	44	42	2	24
7	Hampstead and Westminster	18	5	3	10	37	52	-15	17*
8	Bowdon	18	4	2	12	30	53	-23	14
9	Havant	18	3	3	12	32	60	-28	12
10	Southgate	18	1	2	15	21	62	-41	5

deducted one point*

= Champions
= Relegated

=== Results ===
Home \ Away	Bee	Bow	Can	EG	HW	Hav	Lou	Rea	Sou	Sub
Beeston	—	5–3	5–3	2–4	2–2	2–1	4–2	3–0	8–1	2–1
Bowdon	3–4	—	2–2	1–1	1–0	3–2	0–1	0–1	3–0	1–4
Cannock	0–0	7–1	—	2–1	2–2	6–3	1–2	3–2	2–0	4–4
East Grinstead	2–3	6–0	2–0	—	5–1	3–2	5–4	2–1	3–1	0–0
Hampstead and Westminster	3–1	4–1	0–3	3–5	—	2–0	5–2	0–6	3–1	4–4
Havant	1–5	3–2	1–7	4–7	4–3	—	3–3	0–2	3–2	2–2
Loughborough Students	2–2	2–1	2–2	2–3	3–0	4–0	—	2–6	4–0	3–3
Reading	2–2	5–2	5–0	3–2	4–1	3–0	2–1	—	3–0	1–3
Southgate	1–4	1–2	1–2	1–8	3–2	2–2	2–2	1–4	—	2–3
Surbiton	4–0	5–4	3–4	3–5	5–2	2–1	3–3	1–1	4–2	—

Legend: Blue = home team win; Yellow = draw; Red = away team win.

== Women's Slazenger Premier Division League Standings ==
Pos	Team	P	W	D	L	F	A	Pts
1	Bowdon Hightown	18	17	0	1	60	12	51
2	Olton & West Warwicks	18	11	3	4	67	35	36
3	Canterbury	18	10	5	3	50	26	35
4	Leicester	18	9	4	5	39	19	31
5	Slough	18	9	2	7	46	30	29
6	Clifton	18	8	3	7	36	38	27
7	Brooklands Poynton	18	5	3	10	23	40	18
8	Trojans	18	3	5	10	17	31	14
9	Ipswich	18	2	3	13	18	54	9
10	Chelmsford	18	1	2	15	8	79	5

= Champions
= Relegated

== Men's Cup ==
=== Quarter-finals ===
Team 1	Team 2	Score
Reading	Old Loughtonians	w/o
Fareham	Brooklands MU	5-3
Canterbury	Bowdon	5-4
Beeston	Cannock	2-1

=== Semi-finals ===
Team 1	Team 2	Score
Beeston	Canterbury	5-1
Reading	Fareham	7-1

=== Final ===
(Held at the Highfields Hockey Centre, Nottingham on 17 May)

Team 1	Team 2	Score
Reading	Beeston	3-1

== Women's Cup ==
=== Quarter-finals ===
Team 1	Team 2	Score
Barnes	Cambridge City	4-1
Epsom	Reading	0-4
Bowdon Hightown	Sutton Coldfield	6-3
Univ of Birmingham	Clifton	4-3

=== Semi-finals ===
Team 1	Team 2	Score
Reading	Univ of Birmingham	5-4
Bowdon Hightown	Barnes	6-0

=== Final ===
(Held at Highfields Hockey Centre, Nottingham on 17 May)

Team 1	Team 2	Score
Bowdon Hightown	Reading	2-1
