= 1982–83 England Hockey League season =

English field hockey season

1982–83 England Hockey League

The 1982–83 English Hockey League season took place from September 1982 until May 1983.

The principal event for men was the National Inter League Championship which brought together the winners of their respective regional leagues. The Men's championship was won by Slough

The Men's Cup was won by Neston and the Women's Cup was won by Slough.

== Men's Truman National Inter League Championship ==
(Held at Eastcote, May 7–8)

=== Group A ===
Team 1	Team 2	Score
Slough	Swalwell	2-1
Trojans	Olton & West Warwicks	1-1
Trojans	Swalwell	3-0
Olton & West Warwicks	Slough	0-1
Olton & West Warwicks	Swalwell	0-4
Slough	Trojans	1-1

Pos	Team	P	W	D	L	F	A	Pts
1	Slough	3	2	1	0	4	2	5
2	Trojans	3	1	2	0	5	2	4
3	Swalwell	3	1	0	2	5	5	2
4	Olton & West Warwicks	3	0	1	2	1	6	1

=== Group B ===
Team 1	Team 2	Score
Fareham	Neston	1-1
Westcliff	Isca	1-1
Westcliff	Fareham	1-2
Isca	Neston	2-2
Fareham	Isca	1-0
Neston	Westcliff	2-1

Pos	Team	P	W	D	L	F	A	Pts
1	Fareham	3	2	1	0	4	2	5
2	Neston	3	1	2	0	5	4	5
3	Isca	3	0	2	1	3	4	2
3	Westcliff	3	0	1	2	3	5	1

= Qualified for final

=== Final ===
Team 1	Team 2	Score
Slough	Fareham	2-1 aet

Slough
Paul Loudon, Steve Partington, John Allen, Kartar Davatwal, Brajinder Daved, Avtar Singh Matharu, S Davatwal, Ken Partington, Bal Saini (Gurdial Davatwal sub), Ravinder Laly, Ahmed Maqsood
Fareham
Kevin Burge, Paul Burd, Paul Hastings, Derek Bradbury, Mike Farmer, Guy Lawson, Nigel Eves, Chris Kirkham, Colin Bradbury (Nigel Cook sub), Andy Atkins, Paul Jones

== Men's Cup (Rank Xerox National Clubs Championship) ==
Neston won the Men's National Cup.

=== Quarter-finals ===
Team 1	Team 2	Score
Southgate	Richmond	2-0
Slough	Teddington	4-1
Neston	Harborne	1-0
Beckenham	Cambridge City	1-0

=== Semi-finals ===
Team 1	Team 2	Score
Neston*	Southgate	0-0
Slough	Beckenham	5-0

*Neston won on penalty strokes

=== Final ===
(Apr 17, St Albans)

Team 1	Team 2	Score
Neston	Slough	3-2

Neston
Pete Wise, Colin Cubley, Phil McKeown, John Royce, Malcolm Wilkinson, Stan Stannard, Tony Pickthall, Steve Greene, Robbie Smith, Pete Renshaw, David Church
Slough
Paul Loudon, Paul Barber, Manjit Flora, Steve Partington, Brajinder Daved, Avtar Singh Matharu, Ken Partington, Bal Saini, Bhaji Flora, Ravinder Laly, Kuki Dhak

== Women's Cup (National Clubs Championship) ==
Slough won the Women's National Cup.

=== Semi-finals ===
(Apr 9, Oakham School)

Team 1	Team 2	Score
Chelmsford	Orpington	2–0
Slough	Ealing	3–1

=== Final ===
(Apr 23, Luton)

Team 1	Team 2	Score	Scorers
Slough	Chelmsford	2–0	Lesley Hobley (2)
