= 1983–84 England Hockey League season =

English field hockey season

1983–84 England Hockey League

The 1983–84 English Hockey League season took place from September 1983 until May 1984.

The principal event for men was the National Inter League Championship which brought together the winners of their respective regional leagues. The Men's championship was won by Neston

The Men's Cup was won by East Grinstead and the Women's Cup was won by Sheffield.

== Men's Truman National Inter League Championship ==
(Held at Willesden Leisure Centre, May 4–5)

=== Pool A ===
Team
Neston
Lyons
Isca

=== Pool B ===
Team
Southgate
Cambridge City
Harborne

= Qualified for semi-finals

=== Semi-finals & Final ===
Round	Team 1	Team 2	Score
Semi-final	Neston	Cambridge City	1-1 (6-5 p)
Semi-final	Lyons	Southgate	1-0
Final	Neston	Lyons	3-0

Neston
Chris Ashcroft, David Peters, Colin Cubley (capt), Phil McKeown, Mal Wilkinson, Stan Stannard, Tony Pickthall, John Royce, David Church, Pete Renshaw, Steve Greene
Lyons
B Potier, B deSouza, R Vikhu (capt), M Deegan, V Jolly, B Soor, R Rai, D Channa, M Shahzad, Sunny Soor, B Brar

== Men's Cup (National Clubs Championship/Hockey Association Cup) ==
The 1983-84 edition of the Men's Cup (the National Clubs Championship) saw a new trophy presented to the winners known as the Hockey Association Cup. In later years the competition would be known by this name.

=== Quarter-finals ===
Team 1	Team 2	Score
Blueharts	Hounslow	0-1
East Grinstead	Southgate	1-1 (8-7 p)
Fareham	Bedford	1-0
Pickwick	Blackheath	0-1

=== Semi-finals ===
Team 1	Team 2	Score
East Grinstead	Fareham	2-1
Hounslow	Blackheath	0-1

=== Final ===
(Apr 14, Willesden Sports Centre)

Team 1	Team 2	Score
East Grinstead	Blackheath	1-0

East Grinstead
Ian Taylor, Michael Leman, Longstreet, G Lee, H Bently (M Thompson sub), Peter Head, Richard Leman, S Cole, James Leman, Bram van Asselt, Ian Westwood
Blackheath
Mohan Singh Kalsi, Harjinder Singh Dhami, Parminder Singh Kalsi, Brad Rehling, Brajinder Daved, Badar Butt, Albert De Souza, Peter Abreo, Cyril Nazareth (Shahid Khan sub), Imtiaz Sheikh, Nirmal Singh Kalsi

== Women's Cup (National Clubs Championship) ==
(Cheltenham, April 14–15)

=== Pool A ===
Pos	Team	P	W	D	L
1	Sutton Coldfield	4	3	1	0
2	Sheffield	4	1	2	1
3	Cheltenham Civil Service	4	1	2	1
4	Orpington	4	1	1	2
5	Chelsea College	4	1	0	3

=== Pool B ===
Pos	Team	P	W	D	L
1	Ipswich	4	4	0	0
2	Hightown	4	2	1	1
3	Leicester	4	0	3	1
4	Wimbledon	4	0	2	2
5	Redland	4	0	2	2

= Qualified for semi-finals

=== Semi-finals & Final ===
Round	Team 1	Team 2	Score
Semi-final	Sheffield	Ipswich	?
Semi-final	Hightown	Sutton Coldfield	?
Final	Sheffield	Hightown	0-0 (4-2 p)
