= 1979–80 in English field hockey =

1979–80 in English field hockey. The Men's Cup was won by Slough and the Women's Cup was won by Norton.

The Men's National Inter League Championship brought together the winners of their respective regional leagues. The championship (held in September 1980) was won by Slough.

As from the 1980–81 season the National Inter League Championship would be held in the spring of the same season instead of the Autumn of the following season.

== Men's Truman National Inter League Championship ==
(Held at Barclays Bank Sports Ground, North Ealing, September 20–21)

=== Group A ===
Team 1	Team 2	Score
Cannock	Neston	1-3
Trojans	Slough	1-6
Trojans	Cannock	3-1
Slough	Neston	4-1
Slough	Cannock	5-1
Trojans	Neston	0-2

Pos	Team	P	W	D	L	F	A	Pts
1	Slough	3	3	0	0	15	3	6
2	Neston	3	2	0	1	6	5	4
3	Trojans	3	1	0	2	4	9	2
4	Cannock	3	0	0	3	3	11	0

=== Group B ===
Team 1	Team 2	Score
East Grinstead	Isca	1-4
Westcliff	Sheffield	4-3
East Grinstead	Westcliff	1-3
Sheffield	Isca	3-3
Sheffield	East Grinstead	4-0
Isca	Westcliff	2-3

Pos	Team	P	W	D	L	F	A	Pts
1	Westcliff	3	3	0	0	10	6	6
2	Sheffield	3	1	1	1	10	7	3
3	Isca	3	1	1	1	9	7	3
3	East Grinstead	3	0	0	3	2	11	0

= Qualified for final

=== Final ===
Team 1	Team 2	Score
Slough	Westcliff	5-0

Slough
Ian Taylor, Paul Barber, Manjit Flora, Andy Churcher, Steve Partington, Suti Khehar, Brajinder Daved, Stuart Collins, Ken Partington, Bal Saini, Ravinder Laly, Bhaji Flora
Westcliff
M Kay, R Holmes, P Wakeford, R Hilton, N Havens, P Anderson, N Boddington, T Copping, Ian Towler, M Bond, J French

== Men's Cup (Rank Xerox National Clubs Championship) ==
Slough won the Men's National Cup.

=== Quarter-finals ===
Team 1	Team 2	Score
Southgate	Westcliff	3-2
Slough	Isca	5-1
Guildford	Brooklands	2-1
St Albans	Royal Army Pay Corps	4-0

=== Semi-finals ===
Team 1	Team 2	Score
Guildford	Southgate	4-1
Slough	St Albans	2-0

=== Final ===
(Held at Guildford Hockey Club on 27 April)

Team 1	Team 2	Score
Slough	Guildford	2-1

Slough
Ian Taylor, Mike Parris, Paul Barber, Manjit Flora, John Allen, Suti Khehar, Brajinder Daved, Ken Partington, Ravinder Laly (Stuart Collins sub), Balwant Saini, John Murdock
Guildford
R Wright, I Carley, Andrew Cairns, J Bowerman, Ian Pinks, N Taylor, A Jeans, P Penock, Neil Francis, C Booker (P Rosomun sub), C Cottrell

== Women's Cup (National Clubs Championship) ==
Norton won the Women's National Cup.

=== Semi-finals ===
- Held at the University of East Anglia, Norwich, 13 April

Team 1	Team 2	Score
Norton	Wolverhampton	1–0
Chelmsford	Leicester	2–1

=== Final ===
- Held at the University of East Anglia, Norwich, 14 April

Team 1	Team 2	Score
Norton	Chelmsford	2–1

Norton squad
Jule Hopkins, Annette Imisson, Jenny Manser, Anne Whitworth, Delphine Brady, Sue Readhead, Judy Pringle, Gill Pedley, Maureen Thersby, Jackie Edwards, Dot Anderson, Anne Wright, Sue Driver
