= 1976–77 in English field hockey =

1976–77 England Hockey League

The 1976–77 English Hockey League season took place from September 1976 until May 1977.

The Men's Cup was won by Slough.

The Men's National Inter League Championship, sponsored by Courage Brewery, brought together the winners of their respective regional leagues. The championship (held in September 1977) was won by Southgate.

As from the 1980-81 season the National Inter League Championship would be held in the spring of the same season instead of the Autumn of the following season.

== Men's Courage National Inter League Championship ==
(Held at Aston University Grounds, Birmingham, September 10–11)

=== Group A ===
| Team 1 | Team 2 | Score |
|---|---|---|
| Bournville | Southgate | 1-2 |
| Furness Athletic | Havant | 2-1 |
| Furness Athletic | Southgate | 2-1 |
| Bournville | Havant | 2-1 |
| Southgate | Havant | 5-1 |
| Furness Athletic | Bournville | 2-6 |

| Pos | Team | P | W | D | L | F | A | Pts |
|---|---|---|---|---|---|---|---|---|
| 1 | Southgate | 3 | 2 | 0 | 1 | 8 | 4 | 4 |
| 2 | Bournville | 3 | 2 | 0 | 1 | 9 | 5 | 4 |
| 3 | Furness Athletic | 3 | 2 | 0 | 1 | 6 | 8 | 4 |
| 4 | Havant | 3 | 0 | 0 | 3 | 3 | 9 | 0 |

=== Group B ===
| Team 1 | Team 2 | Score |
|---|---|---|
| Hightown | Bedfordshire Eagles | 0-1 |
| Indian Gymkhana | Sheffield | 5-2 |
| Bedfordshire Eagles | Sheffield | 2-1 |
| Hightown | Indian Gymkhana | 3-2 |
| Bedfordshire Eagles | Indian Gymkhana | 3-0 |
| Hightown | Sheffield | 6-2 |

| Pos | Team | P | W | D | L | F | A | Pts |
|---|---|---|---|---|---|---|---|---|
| 1 | Bedfordshire Eagles | 3 | 3 | 0 | 0 | 6 | 1 | 6 |
| 2 | Hightown | 3 | 2 | 0 | 1 | 9 | 5 | 4 |
| 3 | Indian Gymkhana | 3 | 1 | 0 | 2 | 7 | 8 | 2 |
| 3 | Sheffield | 3 | 0 | 0 | 3 | 5 | 13 | 0 |

| = Qualified for final |

=== Final ===
| Team 1 | Team 2 | Score |
|---|---|---|
| Southgate | Bedfordshire Eagles | 2-1 |

Southgate
David Owen (gk), Nigel Woolven, Howard Manton, Andy Wallace, Geoffrey Hitchens, Raj Rawal, David Whitaker, Bernie Cotton, Peter Hazell, Alistair McGinn, Jimmy Neale
Bedfordshire Eagles
R Tatman, M Blake, H Dharml, M Kavanagh, Brajinder Daved, P Goodyear, P Ellis, M Ganesh, T Sharma, Benawra Singh, G Player

== Men's Cup (Benson & Hedges National Clubs Championship) ==
=== Quarter-finals ===
| Team 1 | Team 2 | Score |
|---|---|---|
| St Albans | Isca | 1-1 (4-2 p) |
| Slough | Marlborough | 4-1 |
| Beckenham | Liverpool Sefton | 2-0 |
| Nottingham | RAF Strike Command | 1-0 aet |

=== Semi-finals ===
| Team 1 | Team 2 | Score |
|---|---|---|
| St Albans | Beckenham | 1-2 |
| Slough | Nottingham | 0-0 Slough pens |

=== Final ===
(Held at Slough Hockey Club on 1 May)

| Team 1 | Team 2 | Score |
|---|---|---|
| Slough | Beckenham | 1-0 |

Slough
Ian Taylor, John Brindley, Mike Parris, Andy Churcher, John Allen, John Murdock, Suti Khehar, Pami Saini, Stuart Collins, Bal Saini, D S Earl (Partington sub)
Beckenham
S Port, B N Mills, R Fell, M B Swayne, B J Green, I Westwood, Chris Rule, A Matheson (P Taylor sub), J Armour (A Page sub), I S McIntosh, P Anderson
