= 2004–05 England Hockey League season =

English field hockey season

2004–05 England Hockey League

The 2004–05 English Hockey League season took place from September 2004 until May 2005.

The men's title was won by Cannock for the third consecutive year. The women's title went to Leicester who were known as Fyffes Leicester for sponsorship purposes. There were no playoffs to determine champions after the regular season but there was a competition for the top four clubs called the Super Cup which was held at Guildford Hockey Club from 30 April - 2 May.

The Men's Cup was won by Cannock and the Women's Cup was won by Leicester.

== Men's Premier Division League Standings ==
Pos	Team	P	W	D	L	F	A	GD	Pts
1	Cannock	22	18	3	1	97	38	59	57
2	Reading	22	15	4	3	74	33	41	49
3	Loughborough Students	22	13	6	3	72	41	31	45
4	Guildford	22	11	5	6	78	51	27	38
5	Surbiton	22	8	7	7	61	47	14	31
6	Chelmsford	22	9	4	9	61	57	4	31
7	Old Loughtonians	22	9	2	11	51	56	-5	29
8	Hampstead and Westminster	22	8	4	10	58	52	6	28
9	Canterbury	22	8	2	12	46	54	-8	26
10	Teddington	22	7	1	14	42	72	-30	22
11	Bristol Firebrands	22	5	4	13	51	73	-22	19
12	St Albans	22	0	0	22	10	127	-117	0

= Champions
= Qualified for Super Cup
= Relegated

== Women's Premier Division League Standings ==
Pos	Team	P	W	D	L	F	A	Pts
1	Leicester	22	16	5	1	64	26	53
2	Ipswich	22	16	2	4	57	29	50
3	Canterbury	22	14	4	4	55	21	46
4	Chelmsford	22	14	4	4	52	22	46
5	Slough	22	12	3	7	56	42	39
6	Bowdon Hightown	22	12	2	8	65	53	38
7	Olton & West Warwicks	22	10	4	8	61	45	34
8	Clifton	22	6	3	13	36	51	21
9	Doncaster	22	6	1	15	32	49	19
10	Harleston Magpies	22	4	4	14	36	67	16
11	Trojans	22	4	3	15	26	62	15
12	Sutton Coldfield	22	0	1	21	18	91	1

= Champions
= Qualified for Super Cup
= Relegated

== Men's Super Cup Standings ==
Pos	Team	P	W	D	L	F	A	Pts
1	Cannock	3	2	0	1	10	9	6
2	Reading	3	1	2	0	7	6	5
3	Loughborough Students	3	1	1	1	16	11	4
4	Guildford	3	0	1	2	8	15	1

= Winners

== Women's Super Cup Standings ==
Pos	Team	P	W	D	L	F	A	Pts
1	Canterbury	3	2	1	0	6	2	7
2	Leicester	3	2	0	1	6	4	6
3	Chelmsford	3	1	1	1	5	7	4
4	Ipswich	3	0	0	3	2	6	0

= Winners

== Men's Cup (EHA Cup) ==
=== Quarter-finals ===
Team 1	Team 2	Score
Cannock	Old Loughtonians	1-0
Loughborough Students	Holcombe	7-0
Belper	Reading	2-3 aet
Guildford	Southgate	2-1

=== Semi-finals ===
Team 1	Team 2	Score
Loughborough Students	Reading	1-0
Cannock	Guildford	6-5

=== Final ===
(Held at the Canterbury on 20 March)

Team 1	Team 2	Score
Cannock	Loughborough Students	2-0

== Women's Cup (EHA Cup) ==
=== Quarter-finals ===
Team 1	Team 2	Score	Note
Slough	Leicester	1-4	
Doncaster	Clifton	0-1	
Harleston Magpies	Preston Leyland	w/o	Preston withdrew
Chelmsford	Canterbury	2-0	

=== Semi-finals ===
Team 1	Team 2	Score
Clifton	Harleston Magpies	5-2
Leicester	Chelmsford	3-0

=== Final ===
(Held at Canterbury on 20 March)

Team 1	Team 2	Score
Leicester	Clifton	2-0
