= 1997–98 England Hockey League season =

English field hockey season

1997–98 England Hockey League

The 1997–98 English Hockey League season took place from October 1997 until May 1998.

The Men's National League was won by Cannock with the Women's National League going to Slough.

The Men's Hockey Association Cup was won by Cannock and the Women's Cup (AEWHA Cup) was won by Clifton.

== Men's National League Premier Division League Standings ==
Pos	Team	P	W	D	L	F	A	GD	Pts
1	Cannock	22	18	2	2	89	36	53	56
2	Canterbury	22	15	3	4	99	55	44	48
3	Reading	22	14	2	6	77	57	20	44
4	Southgate	22	12	3	7	71	56	15	39
5	Old Loughtonians	22	10	5	7	62	52	10	35
6	Teddington	22	10	3	9	65	65	0	33
7	East Grinstead	22	9	3	10	51	59	-8	30
8	Guildford	22	8	1	13	53	63	-10	25
9	Beeston	22	5	3	13	37	69	-32	18
10	Hounslow	22	4	5	12	38	60	-22	17
11	Barford Tigers	22	4	5	13	40	79	-39	17
12	Doncaster	22	2	5	15	55	86	-31	11

= Champions
= Relegated

== Women's National League Premier Division League Standings ==
Pos	Team	P	W	D	L	F	A	Pts
1	Slough	14	13	1	0	73	22	40
2	Clifton	14	8	2	4	27	21	26
3	Ipswich	14	8	1	5	32	20	25
4	Olton & West Warwicks	14	6	2	6	24	29	20
5	Hightown	14	5	3	6	18	24	18
6	Sutton Coldfield	14	4	2	8	23	38	14
7	Doncaster	14	2	4	8	19	40	10
8	Trojans	14	1	3	10	20	42	6

= Champions
= Relegated

== Men's Cup (Hockey Association Cup) ==
=== Quarter-finals ===
Team 1	Team 2	Score
Beeston	Doncaster	3-0
Chichester	Stourport	3-1
Cannock	Old Cranleighans	11-2
Canterbury	Barford Tigers	3-1

=== Semi-finals ===
Team 1	Team 2	Score
Beeston	Chichester	5-2
Cannock	Canterbury	3-2 aet

=== Final ===
(Held at the National Hockey Stadium (Milton Keynes) on 5 April)

Team 1	Team 2	Score
Cannock	Beeston	4-1

Cannock
Jimi Lewis, Paul Edwards, Andy Humphrey, Craig Parnham, Michael Johnson, Kalbir Takher, Justin Pidcock, Ben Sharpe, Chris Mayer, Bobby Crutchley, Ian Hughes-Rowlands subs Simon Organ, John Mills, Will Glover, Gareth Terrett
Beeston
Danny Williams, Richard Stamp, Steven Wood, Keith Reesby, Andrew Seagar, Ashley Garratt, Craig Keegan, Andrew West, Paul Sheardown, Iain Randall, Mike Huckle subs Jeff Longden, Phil Sully, James McBlane

== Women's Cup (AEWHA Cup) ==
=== Quarter-finals ===
Team 1	Team 2	Score
Loughborough Students	Aldridge	2-1
Clifton	Trojans	4-1
Hightown	Sutton Coldfield	4-1
Doncaster	Slough	2-7

=== Semi-finals ===
Team 1	Team 2	Score
Clifton	Hightown	4-1
Slough	Loughborough Students	5-1

=== Final ===
(Held at National Hockey Stadium (Milton Keynes) on 10 May)

Team 1	Team 2	Score
Clifton	Slough	1-1 (5-4 p)

Clifton
Claire Burr, Sue Brimble; J Martin, Michelle Robertson, J Scullion, Tammy Miller (capt), Lorraine Marsden, Louise Hipkins; Lucy Culliford, Denise Marston-Smith, Juliet Rayden. sub Elaine Basterfield
Slough
Sue Knight, Lisa Copeland, Mandy Pottow, Michelle Hall, Ashleigh Wallace, Lucy Cope, Sue Chandler (capt), Alison Burd, Julie Robertson, Lesley Hobley, Helen Thornalley sub C Cummins, K Brannigan
