= England Hockey Men's Championship Cup =

English field hockey cup

- First season: 1971–72
- Folded: 2025–26
- Administrator: England Hockey
- Country: England
- Most titles: Reading (10 titles)
- Website: England Hockey Championships

The England Hockey Men's Championship Cup was a field hockey cup competition organised by England Hockey that features men's teams from England. The competition was originally known as the National Clubs Championship. The inaugural competition was won by Hounslow in 1971–72. It has also been known as the Hockey Association Cup and the EHA Cup.

In 2025–2026 the event which included Premier division teams was discontinued in favour of a lower tier events.

== Finals ==
=== National Clubs Championship ===
| Season | Winners | Score | Runners Up | Venue |
|---|---|---|---|---|
| 1971–72 | Hounslow | 3–0 | Norwich Grasshoppers | Crystal Palace |
| 1972–73 | Hounslow | 4–0 | Bristol | Colston's School, Bristol |
| 1973–74 | Southgate | 3–0 | Bedfordshire Eagles | Luton |
| 1974–75 | Southgate | 4–0 | Nottingham | Bestwood Park |
| 1975–76 | Nottingham | 2–1 | Hounslow | Hounslow |
| 1976–77 | Slough | 1–0 | Beckenham | Slough |
| 1977–78 | Guildford | 2–1 | Slough | Guildford |
| 1978–79 | Slough | 3-1 | Neston | Slough |
| 1979–80 | Slough | 2–1 | Guildford | Guildford |
| 1980–81 | Slough | 2–1 | Southgate | Guildford |
| 1981–82 | Southgate | 2–1 | Slough | Walker Memorial Ground, Southgate |
| 1982–83 | Neston | 3–2 | Slough | St Albans |

=== Hockey Association Cup ===
| Season | Winners | Score | Runners Up | Venue |
|---|---|---|---|---|
| 1983–84 | East Grinstead | 1–0 | Blackheath | Willesden Sports Centre, Willesden |
| 1984–85 | Southgate | 2–1 | Blackheath | Willesden Sports Centre, Willesden |
| 1985–86 | Southgate | 3–0 | Pickwick | Willesden Sports Centre, Willesden |
| 1986–87 | Southgate | 3–2 | Slough | Old Loughtonians |
| 1987–88 | Southgate | 2–1 | Hounslow | Canterbury |
| 1988–89 | Hounslow | 2–1 | Bromley | Old Loughtonians |
| 1989–90 | Havant | 3–0 | Stourport | Luton |
| 1990–91 | Hounslow | 3–2 | Havant | Kenilworth Road |
| 1991–92 | Hounslow | 3–2 | Teddington | Kenilworth Road |
| 1992–93 | Hounslow | 4–1 | Teddington | Stantonbury Leisure Centre, Milton Keynes |
| 1993–94 | Teddington | 1–0 | Old Loughtonians | University of Birmingham |
| 1994–95 | Guildford | 4–1 | Teddington | Canterbury |
| 1995–96 | Reading | 2–2 (3–2p) | Old Loughtonians | Milton Keynes |
| 1996–97 | Teddington | 2–1 | Reading | Milton Keynes |
| 1997–98 | Cannock | 4–1 | Beeston | Milton Keynes |
| 1998–99 | Reading | 4–4 (5–4p) | Cannock | Milton Keynes |

=== EHA Cup ===
| Season | Winners | Score | Runners Up | Venue |
|---|---|---|---|---|
| 1999–00 | Reading | 3–2 | Old Loughtonians | Milton Keynes |
| 2000–01 | Guildford | 2–1 aet | Reading | Milton Keynes |
| 2001–02 | Cannock | 7–0 | Belper | Milton Keynes |
| 2002–03 | Reading | 4–1 | Cannock | Canterbury |
| 2003–04 | Reading | 2–1 | Surbiton | Cannock |
| 2004–05 | Cannock | 2–0 | Loughborough Students | Canterbury |
| 2005–06 | Reading | 5–2 | East Grinstead | Reading |
| 2006–07 | Cannock | 1–0 | East Grinstead | Reading |
| 2007–08 | Beeston | 4–3 | Bowdon | Highfields Sports Club, Nottingham |
| 2008–09 | Reading | 3–1 | Beeston | Highfields Sports Club, Nottingham |
| 2009–10 | Beeston | 2–1 | Hampstead & Westminster | Highfields Sports Club, Nottingham |
| 2010–11 | Beeston | 6–2 | Doncaster | Cannock |
| 2011–12 | Beeston | 2–1 | Hampstead & Westminster | Cannock |
| 2012–13 | Surbiton | 3–1 | Hampstead & Westminster | Wakefield Hockey Club |
| 2013–14 | Cannock | 2–2 (5–4p) | Brooklands MU | Highfields Sports Club, Nottingham |
| 2014–15 | Reading | 5–1 | Surbiton | Lee Valley |
| 2015–16 | Beeston | 3–0 | Chichester | Lee Valley |
| 2016–17 | Reading | 6–1 | Canterbury | Lee Valley |

=== EH Men's Championship Cup ===
| Season | Winners | Score | Runners Up | Venue |
|---|---|---|---|---|
| 2017–18 | Reading | 2–2 (4–2p) | Beeston | Lee Valley |
| 2018–19 | Bowdon | 4-3 | Canterbury | Lee Valley |
| 2019–20 | Beeston | 9-1 (Note: Final not held until 12 Sep due to COVID-19.) | Fareham | Nottingham Hockey Centre |
| 2020–21 | Oxted | 3-2 | Bowdon | Nottingham Hockey Centre |
| 2021–22 | Old Georgians | 3–0 | Oxted | Lee Valley |
| 2022–23 | Old Georgians | 5–5 (2–1p) | Beeston | Lee Valley |
| 2023–24 | Beeston | 4–2 | Banbury | Lee Valley |
| 2024–25 | Harborne | 2–1 | Indian Gymkhana | Nottingham Hockey Centre |

DISCONTINUED

== See also ==
- Men's England Hockey League
- Women's England Hockey League
- England Hockey Women's Championship Cup
