= 2006–07 England Hockey League season =

English field hockey season

2006–07 England Hockey League

The 2006–07 English Hockey League season took place from September 2006 until April 2007. The league was sponsored by Slazenger and the men's title was won by Reading with the women's title going to Leicester. There were no playoffs during the season.

The Men's Cup was won by Cannock and the Women's Cup was won by Bowdon Hightown.

== Men's Slazenger Premier Division League Standings ==
Pos	Team	P	W	D	L	F	A	GD	Pts
1	Reading	18	14	2	2	69	30	39	44
2	Cannock	18	14	1	3	72	36	36	43
3	Loughborough Students	18	12	2	4	55	42	13	38
4	East Grinstead	18	10	4	4	75	50	25	34
5	Surbiton	18	7	4	7	46	47	-1	25
6	Beeston	18	5	3	10	48	46	2	18
7	Hampstead and Westminster	18	3	7	8	41	57	-16	16
8	Canterbury	18	4	2	12	46	66	-20	14
9	Belper	18	3	3	12	35	73	-38	12
10	Guildford	18	3	2	13	31	70	-39	10*

= Champions
= Relegated

One point deducted*

=== Results ===
Home \ Away	Bee	Bel	Can	Can	EG	Gui	HW	Lou	Rea	Sub
Beeston	—	2–3	5–4	3–4	3–4	2–2	2–3	1–2	1–2	3–1
Belper	1–6	—	1–7	7–3	2–5	1–4	3–3	2–3	0–6	3–4
Cannock	5–1	7–1	—	4–3	3–2	6–2	4–4	6–3	2–3	3–2
Canterbury	4–3	1–2	2–5	—	2–2	3–1	4–5	3–4	4–7	2–2
East Grinstead	1–1	7–1	2–4	7–3	—	9–0	7–2	1–2	1–4	4–3
Guildford	1–7	3–2	2–3	2–4	4–5	—	2–2	2–3	0–5	2–7
Hampstead and Westminster	1–4	1–1	0–2	2–1	3–3	1–3	—	1–2	2–5	4–4
Loughborough Students	1–1	3–1	0–2	6–1	7–7	4–1	4–2	—	4–3	4–1
Reading	3–1	6–2	2–1	3–2	4–5	4–0	2–2	4–1	—	6–2
Surbiton	4–2	2–2	1–4	1–0	2–3	3–0	4–3	3–2	0–0	—

Legend: Blue = home team win; Yellow = draw; Red = away team win.

== Women's Slazenger Premier Division League Standings ==
Pos	Team	P	W	D	L	F	A	Pts
1	Leicester	18	14	2	2	66	22	44
2	Slough	18	13	3	2	58	30	42
3	Canterbury	18	11	3	4	45	22	36
4	Bowdon Hightown	18	10	4	4	72	33	34
5	Chelmsford	18	6	6	6	34	27	24
6	Ipswich	18	5	6	7	37	48	21
7	Olton & West Warwicks	18	5	3	10	29	45	18
8	Old Loughtonians	18	4	4	10	26	59	16
9	Sutton Coldfield	18	2	3	13	29	65	9
10	Doncaster	18	1	4	13	15	60	7

= Champions
= Relegated

== Men's Cup ==
=== Quarter-finals ===
Team 1	Team 2	Score
Cannock	Bournville	4-1
Bowdon	Loughborough Students	3-2
Havant	Surbiton	2-3
East Grinstead	Canterbury	7-3

=== Semi-finals ===
Team 1	Team 2	Score
Cannock	Surbiton	4-3
Bowdon	East Grinstead	2-3

=== Final ===
(Held at the Reading on 1 April)

Team 1	Team 2	Score
Cannock	East Grinstead	1-0

== Women's Cup ==
=== Quarter-finals ===
Team 1	Team 2	Score
Slough	Bristol Firebrands	2-1
Liverpool Sefton	Ipswich	0-1
Bowdon Hightown	St.Albans	6-0
Brooklands Poynton	Chelmsford	1-0

=== Semi-finals ===
Team 1	Team 2	Score
Bowdon Hightown	Ipswich	3-2 aet
Slough	Brooklands Poynton	5-1

=== Final ===
(Held at Reading on 1 April)

Team 1	Team 2	Score
Bowdon Hightown	Slough	2-0
