= 1986–87 England Hockey League season =

English field hockey season

1986–87 England Hockey League

The 1986–87 English Hockey League season took place from September 1986 until May 1987.

The season culminated in the National Inter League Championship for men which brought together the winners of their respective regions. The Men's championship was won by Slough

The Men's Hockey Association Cup was won by Southgate and the Women's Cup (National Club Championship finals) was won by Ealing.

== Men's National Inter League Championship finals ==
(Held at Prescot, Merseyside, May 2–3)

=== Group A ===
Team 1	Team 2	Score
Slough	Isca	2-2
Indian Gymkhana	Isca	2-1
Indian Gymkhana	Slough	0-1

Pos	Team	P	W	D	L	F	A	Pts
1	Slough	2	1	1	0	3	2	4
2	Indian Gymkhana	2	1	0	1	2	2	3
3	Isca	2	0	1	1	3	4	1

=== Group B ===
Team 1	Team 2	Score
Warrington	Coventry & North Warwickshire	3-6
Coventry & North Warwickshire	Old Loughtonians	2-4
Old Loughtonians	Warrington	3-2

Pos	Team	P	W	D	L	F	A	Pts
1	Old Loughtonians	2	2	0	0	7	4	6
2	Coventry & North Warwickshire	2	1	0	1	8	7	3
3	Warrington	2	0	0	2	5	9	0

= Qualified for semi-finals

=== Semi-finals & Final ===
Round	Team 1	Team 2	Score
Semi-final	Slough	Coventry & North Warwickshire	3-1
Semi-final	Old Loughtonians	Indian Gymkhana	5-2
Final	Slough	Old Loughtonians	3-1

Slough
Jon Clark (Paul Loudon sub), Paul Barber, Kartar Davatwal, Manjit Flora, Kalli Saini, Ken Partington, Sutinder Khehar (capt), Bhaji Flora, Chris Maskery, Sheikh Imtiaz (S Ali sub), Steve Partington (R Charlesworth)
Old Loughtonians
C Greenwood, K Hansen (N Thompson sub), M Donnelly, P Anderson, Chris Gladman, P Morris, S Ashton, Nick Thompson (M Hickling sub), D Camilleri (capt), Julian Halls, J Barber

== Men's Cup (En-Tout-Cas Sports Surfaces Hockey Association Cup) ==
=== Quarter-finals ===
Team 1	Team 2	Score
Leicester Westleigh	Hounslow	0-1
Neston	Southgate	1-2
Olton & West Warwick	Slough	0-6
Teddington	Indian Gymkhana	3-2

=== Semi-finals ===
Team 1	Team 2	Score
Slough	Teddington	3-2
Hounslow	Southgate	1-3

=== Final ===
(Held at Old Loughtonians, Chigwell on 17 May)

Team 1	Team 2	Score
Southgate	Slough	3-2

Southgate
David Owern (gk), Richard Dodds, Mike Spray, Chris Picken, Peter Boxell, Andy Western, Paul Moulton (Rupert Welch sub), John Shaw, David Thomas, Steve Batchelor, Sean Kerly
Slough
Jon Clark, Paul Barber, Kartar Davatwal, Manjit Flora, Sutinder (Suti) Khehar, Ken Partington, Kalli Saini, Bhaji Flora, Chris Maskery, Sheikh Imtiaz, Kuki Dhak

== Women's Cup (NatWest National Club Championship finals) ==
(April 25–26, Sheffield)

=== Final ===
Team 1	Team 2	Score
Ealing	Ipswich	1-0
