= 1975–76 in English field hockey =

1975–76 England Hockey League

The 1975–76 English Hockey League season took place from September 1975 until April 1976.

The Men's Cup was won by Nottingham.

The Men's National Inter League Championship brought together the winners of their respective regional leagues. The championship (held in September 1976) was won by Slough.

As from the 1980-81 season the National Inter League Championship would be held in the spring of the same season instead of the Autumn of the following season.

== Men's Courage National Inter League Championship ==
(Held at Aston University Grounds, Birmingham & September 11–12)

=== Group A ===
Team 1	Team 2	Score
Trojans	Hightown	0-0
Norton	Slough	0-3
Norton	Trojans	2-2
Hightown	Slough	0-1
Trojans	Slough	0-1
Hightown	Norton	3-0

Pos	Team	P	W	D	L	F	A	Pts
1	Slough	3	3	0	0	5	0	6
2	Hightown	3	1	1	1	3	1	3
3	Trojans	3	0	2	1	2	3	2
4	Norton	3	0	1	2	2	8	0

=== Group B ===
Team 1	Team 2	Score
Bury St Edmunds YMCA	Bournville	4-3
Eastcote	Sheffield	0-1
Bury St Edmunds YMCA	Eastcote	0-1
Bournville	Sheffield	1-2
Sheffield	Bury St Edmunds YMCA	0-2
Eastcote	Bournville	0-1

Pos	Team	P	W	D	L	F	A	Pts
1	Bury St Edmunds YMCA	3	2	0	1	6	4	4
2	Sheffield	3	2	0	1	3	3	4
3	Bournville	3	1	0	2	5	6	2
3	Eastcote	3	1	0	2	1	2	2

= Qualified for final

=== Final ===
Team 1	Team 2	Score
Slough	Bury St Edmunds YMCA	1-1 (3-1 p)

Slough
D Jackson, John Brindley, Mike Parris, Andy Churcher, John Allen, Suti Khehar, R Napier, John Murdock, Stuart Collins, Bal Saini, Masood Ahmad
Bury St Edmunds
M Sturgeon (D Aldous sub), H Waters, G Brown (A Harvey sub), J Grinham, S Jamieson, M Francis, G Waters, S R L Long, G Randle, L Turner, C Upson

== Men's Cup (Benson & Hedges National Clubs Championship) ==
=== Quarter-finals ===
Team 1	Team 2	Score
Hounslow	Bedfordshire Eagles	1-0 aet
Slough	Northampton Saints	2-1
Isca	RAF Support Command	4-0
Nottingham	Bury St Edmunds YMCA	3-0

=== Semi-finals ===
Team 1	Team 2	Score
Nottingham	Isca	2-0
Slough	Hounslow	0-1

=== Final ===
(Held at Church Meadow, Hounslow, on 25 April)

Team 1	Team 2	Score
Nottingham	Hounslow	2-1

Nottingham
Boddington, Watson, Gill, Elson, Harvey, Appelby, Walters, Maughan, Cassell, Sharpe, Stokes
Hounslow
Graham Brightwell, Mike Featherstone, Glen Evans, Ian Thompson, Peter Badger, Watts, Bill Smith (David Barker sub), Roly Brookeman, Watson, Ian Barrett, Chris Langhorne, Harvinder Sibia
