= 2002–03 England Hockey League season =

English field hockey season

2002–03 England Hockey League

The 2002–03 English Hockey League season took place from September 2002 until May 2003.

The men's title was won by Cannock with the women's title going to Slough. There were no playoffs to determine champions after the regular season but there was a competition for the top four clubs called the Premiership tournament which culminated with men's & women's finals on 5 May.

The Men's Cup was won by Reading and the Women's Cup was won by Canterbury.

== Men's Premier Division League Standings ==
Pos	Team	P	W	D	L	F	A	GD	Pts
1	Cannock	18	16	0	2	91	33	58	48
2	Reading	18	15	1	2	67	27	40	46
3	Surbiton	18	11	2	5	57	30	27	35
4	Loughborough Students	18	10	2	6	56	36	20	32
5	Guildford	18	8	4	6	44	37	7	28
6	Canterbury	18	7	2	9	39	45	-6	23
7	Teddington	18	6	2	10	34	56	-22	20
8	Hampstead and Westminster	18	5	1	12	32	72	-40	16
9	St Albans	18	3	0	15	26	68	-42	9
10	Doncaster	18	1	2	15	35	77	-42	5

= Champions
= Qualified for Premiership tournament
= Relegated

== Women's Premier Division League Standings ==
Pos	Team	P	W	D	L	F	A	Pts
1	Slough	18	14	1	3	65	17	43
2	Olton & West Warwicks	18	12	2	4	44	24	38
3	Canterbury	18	11	4	3	40	27	37
4	Ipswich	18	7	5	6	42	34	26
5	Chelmsford	18	6	8	4	28	30	26
6	Leicester	18	7	4	7	34	38	25
7	Clifton	18	7	2	9	37	34	23
8	Hightown	18	6	5	7	41	48	23
9	Sutton Coldfield	18	2	2	14	25	57	8
10	Trojans	18	0	3	15	19	66	3

= Champions
= Qualified for Premiership tournament
= Relegated

== Men's Premiership Tournament ==
Round	Date	Team 1	Team 2	Score
First round	Apr 26	Loughborough Students	Surbiton	3-2
Positional	Apr 26	Reading	Cannock	4-1
Second round	May 3	Loughborough Students	Cannock	3-2
Final	May 5	Reading	Loughborough Students	5-2

== Women's Premiership Tournament ==
Round	Date	Team 1	Team 2	Score
First round	Apr 26	Canterbury	Ipswich	3-0
Positional	Apr 26	Slough	Olton & West Warwicks	5-3
Second round	May 3	Canterbury	Olton & West Warwicks	3-2
Final	May 5	Slough	Canterbury	2-1

== Men's Cup (EHA Cup) ==
=== Quarter-finals ===
Team 1	Team 2	Score
Cannock	Beeston	10-3
Bowdon	Loughborough Students	2-5
Teddington	Guildford	2-3
St.Albans	Reading	0-6

=== Semi-finals ===
Team 1	Team 2	Score
Reading	Loughborough Students	4-3
Guildford	Cannock	3-3 (3-4 p)

=== Final ===
(Held at the Canterbury on 13 April)

Team 1	Team 2	Score
Reading	Cannock	4-1

Reading
Simon Mason, Rob Todd, Jon Wyatt, Ben Barnes, Rhys Joyce, Simon Towns, Manpreet Kochar, Richard Mantell, Mark Pearn, Ken Robinson, Jonty Clarke. Subs: Adam Mulholland, Howard Hoskin, Andy Watts, Scott Ashdown, Dave Cooper
Cannock
James Fair, Andrew Humphrey, Simon Ramsden, Andrew West, Craig Parnham, Matthew Taylor, Michael Johnson, Ben Sharpe, Andrew Brogdon, Scott Cordon, Martin Jones. Subs: Barry Middleton, Chris Mayer, James Tweddle, Richard Lane, Andrew Gooderham
Scorers
Mantell, Robinson, Ashdown, Hoskin / Lane

== Women's Cup (EHA Cup) ==
=== Quarter-finals ===
Team 1	Team 2	Score
Canterbury	Olton & West Warwick	1-0
Ipswich	Slough	2-3
Trojans	Hightown	1-0
Doncaster	Liverpool O	2-0

=== Semi-finals ===
Team 1	Team 2	Score
Doncaster	Canterbury	0-3
Trojans	Slough	0-8

=== Final ===
(Held at Canterbury on 13 April)

Team 1	Team 2	Score
Canterbury	Slough	4-0

Canterbury
Natalie Westcar, Frances Houslop, Susan Webber, Mel Clewlow, Lucy Burr, Nicky Litchfield, Jackie Laslett, S Sutton, Anna Bennett, Vanessa Lines, Jenny Wilson. Subs: Tasha Brennan, Alice Dunn, Juliet Chapman, Christina Houslop, Hayley Brown
Slough
Beth Storry, Lisa Scarborough, Kate Walsh, Fiona Greenham, Lucy Newcombe, Sue Chandler, A Brown, Carol Voss, Lucy Bevan, Vicky Goodacre, Alex Scott. Subs: Sarah Kelleher, L Walton, Lesley Hobley, L Smith
Scorers
Webber, Bennett (2), Clewlow
