= 2001–02 England Hockey League season =

English field hockey season

2001–02 England Hockey League

The 2001–02 English Hockey League season took place from September 2001 until May 2002.

The men's title was won by Reading with the women's title going to Slough. There were no playoffs to determine champions after the regular season but there was a competition for the top four clubs called the Premiership tournament which culminated with men's & women's finals on 6 May.

The Men's Cup was won by Cannock and the Women's Cup was won by Ipswich.

== Men's Premier Division League Standings ==
Pos	Team	P	W	D	L	F	A	GD	Pts
1	Reading	18	16	1	1	61	24	37	49
2	Surbiton	18	12	2	4	42	24	18	38
3	Cannock	18	10	3	5	45	30	15	33
4	Loughborough Students	18	8	2	8	49	36	13	26
5	Guildford	18	8	2	8	49	37	12	26
6	Canterbury	18	7	2	9	52	56	-4	23
7	Teddington	18	5	4	9	28	44	-16	19
8	Hampstead and Westminster	18	5	2	11	30	41	-11	17
9	Old Loughtonians	18	4	5	9	25	45	-20	17
10	Southgate	18	1	5	12	19	63	-44	8

= Champions
= Qualified for Premiership tournament
= Relegated

== Women's Premier Division League Standings ==
Pos	Team	P	W	D	L	F	A	Pts
1	Slough	18	12	3	3	40	22	39
2	Olton & West Warwicks	18	9	5	4	52	29	32
3	Leicester	18	10	2	6	34	23	32
4	Clifton	18	9	4	5	37	17	31
5	Canterbury	18	7	4	7	30	34	25
6	Chelmsford	18	6	5	7	26	26	23
7	Ipswich	18	6	5	7	34	41	23
8	Hightown	18	5	2	11	29	44	17
9	Sutton Coldfield	18	5	2	11	25	51	17
10	Doncaster	18	4	2	12	23	43	14

= Champions
= Qualified for Premiership tournament
= Qualified for Premiership tournament by virtue of winning EHA cup
= Relegated

== Men's Premiership Tournament ==
Round	Date	Team 1	Team 2	Score
First round	Apr 27	Cannock	Loughborough Students	3-2
Positional	Apr 27	Reading	Surbiton	4-1
Second round	May 4	Surbiton	Cannock	2-1
Final	May 6	Reading	Surbiton	3-2

== Women's Premiership Tournament ==
Round	Date	Team 1	Team 2	Score
First round	Apr 27	Leicester	Ipswich	4-0
Positional	Apr 27	Slough	Olton & West Warwicks	6-1
Second round	May 4	Olton & West Warwicks	Leicester	3-2
Final	May 6	Olton & West Warwicks	Slough	3-1

== Men's Cup (EHA Cup) ==
=== Quarter-finals ===
Team 1	Team 2	Score
Cannock	Bath Buccaneers	5-2
Bowdon	Havant	2-0
Southgate	Teddington	2-3
Belper	Doncaster	2-3

=== Semi-finals ===
Team 1	Team 2	Score
Belper	Bowdon	1-1 (7-6 p)
Teddington	Cannock	1-6

=== Final ===
(Held at the National Hockey Stadium (Milton Keynes) on 7 April)

Team 1	Team 2	Score
Cannock	Belper	7-0

Scorers
Ben Sharpe (3), Craig Parnham, Andy Humphrey, Simon Ramsden, Matt Taylor

== Women's Cup (EHA Cup) ==
=== Quarter-finals ===
Team 1	Team 2	Score
Ipswich	Bradford	4-0
Olton & West Warwick	St.Albans	2-1
Hounslow & Ealing	Sutton Coldfield	3-4
Deeside Ramblers	Leyland Motors	2-3

=== Semi-finals ===
Team 1	Team 2	Score
Olton & West Warwick	Leyland Motors	8-0
Ipswich	Sutton Coldfield	5-2

=== Final ===
(Held at National Hockey Stadium (Milton Keynes) on 7 April)

Team 1	Team 2	Score	Note
Ipswich	Olton & West Warwick	3-2	golden goal

Scorers
Leisa King (3)
