= 1995–96 England Hockey League season =

English field hockey season

1995–96 England Hockey League

The 1995–96 English Hockey League season took place from October 1995 until April 1996.

The Men's National League was won by Cannock with the Women's National League going to Hightown.

The Men's Hockey Association Cup was won by Reading and the AEWHA Cup was won by Ipswich.

== Men's National League First Division League Standings ==
Pos	Team	P	W	D	L	F	A	GD	Pts
1	Cannock	17	13	3	1	75	15	60	42
2	Reading	17	11	5	1	59	25	34	38
3	Old Loughtonians	17	12	2	3	54	24	30	38
4	Guildford	17	11	4	2	64	31	33	37
5	Southgate	17	11	3	3	57	22	35	36
6	Surbiton	17	9	4	4	44	28	16	31
7	East Grinstead	17	8	3	6	46	40	6	27
8	Canterbury	17	8	2	7	36	33	3	26
9	Havant	17	8	2	7	38	35	3	26
10	Teddington	17	7	4	6	35	35	0	25
11	Hounslow	17	7	2	8	30	32	-2	23
12	Barford Tigers	17	6	4	7	37	40	-3	22
13	Trojans	17	4	3	10	22	42	-20	15
14	Stourport	17	2	5	10	27	56	-29	11
15	Indian Gymkhana	17	3	2	12	25	64	-39	11
16	Bournville	17	3	1	13	20	61	-41	10
17	St Albans	17	3	1	13	18	62	-44	10
18	Hull	17	1	2	14	16	60	-44	5

= Champions
= Relegated

== Women's National League Premier Division League Standings ==
Pos	Team	P	W	D	L	F	A	Pts
1	Hightown	14	9	2	3	26	10	29
2	Ipswich	14	8	2	4	27	11	26
3	Sutton Coldfield	14	7	4	3	25	13	25
4	Slough	14	8	0	6	19	18	24
5	Clifton	14	7	2	5	17	12	23
6	Leicester	14	5	5	4	18	21	20
7	Doncaster	14	3	1	10	12	23	10
8	Bracknell	14	0	2	12	3	39	2

= Champions
= Relegated

== Men's Cup (Hockey Association Cup) ==
=== Quarter-finals ===
Team 1	Team 2	Score
East Grinstead	Havant	4-3
Old Loughtonians	Southgate	5-3
Teddington	Canterbury	4-2
Reading	Guildford	3-3

=== Semi-finals ===
Team 1	Team 2	Score
Reading	Teddington	3-2
Old Loughtonians	East Grinstead	1-0

=== Final ===
(Held at Milton Keynes on 28 April)

Team 1	Team 2	Score
Reading	Old Loughtonians	2-2 aet (3-2 p)

- Goals - Mark Pearn, Howard Hoskin / Julian Halls, Nicky Thompson
- Pens - Paddy Osborn, Jon Wyatt, Chris Willis / David Ralph Steve Carter

== Women's Cup (AEWHA Cup) ==
=== Quarter-finals ===
Team 1	Team 2	Score
Doncaster	Ealing	3-0
Clifton	Slough	1-1 (3-0 p)
Aldridge	Chelmsford	0-1
Ipswich	Olton & West Warwick	1-0

=== Semi-finals ===
Team 1	Team 2	Score
Clifton	Chelmsford	
Ipswich	Doncaster	

=== Final ===
(Held at Milton Keynes on 19 May)

Team 1	Team 2	Score
Ipswich	Clifton	0-0 (3-0 p)

Ipswich
Jo Thompson, Lorraine Catchpole, Lisa Copeland, Annette Strange, Colleen Adcock, Lucy Youngs, Sandy Lister (capt), Tracy Fry, Debbie Rawlinson, Jane Smith, Leisa King Subs Sarah Bamfield, Vickey Dixon, Kirsten Spencer
Clifton
Claire Burr, Sue Brimble, N Swan, Rachel O'Bryan (capt), Elaine Basterfield, A Wright, Michelle Robertson, Lorraine Marsden, Charlotte Merrett, Lucy Culliford, Ros Gollop Subs P Wiltshire, C Britten, J Scullion
