= 2003–04 England Hockey League season =

English field hockey season

2003–04 England Hockey League

The 2003–04 English Hockey League season took place from September 2003 until May 2004.

The men's title was won by Cannock for the second consecutive year with the women's title going to Hightown. There were no playoffs to determine champions or relegation after the regular season but there was a competition for the top six clubs called the Premiership tournament which culminated in a final held at Old Loughtonians Hockey Club on 9 May.

The Men's Cup was won by Reading and the Women's Cup was won by Hightown.

== Men's Premier Division League Standings ==
Pos	Team	P	W	D	L	F	A	GD	Pts
1	Cannock	18	13	4	1	69	35	34	43
2	Reading	18	13	3	2	73	38	35	42
3	Surbiton	18	9	6	3	44	35	9	33
4	Loughborough Students	18	8	4	6	44	36	8	28
5	Hampstead and Westminster	18	7	4	7	47	47	0	25
6	Old Loughtonians	18	6	2	10	37	50	-13	20
7	St Albans	18	5	2	11	33	60	-27	17
8	Guildford	18	4	4	10	27	39	-12	16
9	Canterbury	18	4	3	11	46	60	-14	15
10	Teddington	18	5	0	13	31	51	-20	15

= Champions
= Qualified for Premiership tournament

== Women's Premier Division League Standings ==
Pos	Team	P	W	D	L	F	A	Pts
1	Hightown	18	12	4	2	64	40	40
2	Chelmsford	18	11	2	5	50	29	35
3	Clifton	18	8	4	6	42	37	28
4	Canterbury	18	8	2	8	37	41	26
5	Doncaster	18	8	1	9	42	44	25
6	Slough	18	6	5	7	37	32	23
7	Leicester	18	6	5	7	27	27	23
8	Sutton Coldfield	18	6	5	7	39	43	23
9	Olton & West Warwicks	18	6	5	7	43	52	23
10	Ipswich	18	1	3	14	26	62	6

= Champions
= Qualified for Premiership tournament

== Men's Premiership Tournament ==
Round	Team 1	Team 2	Score
First round	Surbiton	Old Loughtonians	5-3
First round	Loughborough Students	Hampstead and Westminster	3-1
Second round	Loughborough Students	Surbiton	3-2
Third round	Reading	Cannock	5-2
Semi-final	Cannock	Loughborough Students	5-4
Final	Reading	Cannock	1-1 (5-4 p)

== Women's Premiership Tournament ==
Round	Team 1	Team 2	Score
First round	Canterbury	Doncaster	5-2
First round	Slough	Clifton	5-1
Second round	Canterbury	Slough	2-0
Third round	Hightown	Chelmsford	2-1
Semi-final	Chelmsford	Canterbury	1-1 (3-2 p)
Final	Hightown	Chelmsford	4-3

== Men's Cup (EHA Cup) ==
=== Quarter-finals ===
Team 1	Team 2	Score
Chelmsford	Cannock	1-8
Surbiton	Holcombe	6-2
Firebrands	Bath Buccaneers	3-2 aet
Teddington	Reading	2-7

=== Semi-finals ===
Team 1	Team 2	Score
Reading	Firebrands	3-2
Surbiton	Cannock	3-1

=== Final ===
(Held at the Cannock on 4 April)

Team 1	Team 2	Score
Reading	Surbiton	2-1

== Women's Cup (EHA Cup) ==
=== Quarter-finals ===
Team 1	Team 2	Score
Clifton	Leicester	1-3
Liverpool Q	Wimbledon	1-0
Hightown	Harleston Magpies	3-2
Olton & West Warwick	Old Loughtonians	5-1

=== Semi-finals ===
Team 1	Team 2	Score
Hightown	Olton & West Warwick	4-2
Leicester	Liverpool Q	7-0

=== Final ===
(Held at Cannock on 4 April)

Team 1	Team 2	Score
Hightown	Leicester	3-2
