= 1988–89 England Hockey League season =

English field hockey season

1988–89 England Hockey League

The 1988–89 English Hockey League season took place from October 1988 until April 1989.

A new league format was introduced to English hockey whereby two divisions of sixteen teams would compete in the first and second divisions with promotion and relegation. This replaced the previous format of regional leagues. The Men's National League attracted a sponsor in Poundstretcher and they would commit £300,000 over three years.

The inaugural competition was won by Southgate and the top four teams qualified to take part in the Poundstretcher League Cup tournament which was won by Hounslow.

The Men's Hockey Association Cup was won by Hounslow and the Women's Cup (National Club Championship finals) was won by Ealing.

== Men's Poundstretcher National League First Division League Standings ==
Pos	Team	P	W	D	L	F	A	GD	Pts
1	Southgate	15	10	4	1	52	12	40	34
2	Havant	15	11	1	3	26	8	18	34
3	Hounslow	15	9	2	4	41	23	18	29
4	Old Loughtonians	15	7	7	1	37	19	18	28
5	Indian Gymkhana	15	8	3	4	21	18	3	27
6	Bromley	15	6	5	4	23	19	4	23
7	Teddington	15	7	2	6	24	23	1	23
8	East Grinstead	15	6	4	5	22	14	8	22
9	Slough	15	6	4	5	22	14	8	22
10	Welton	15	6	2	7	27	33	-6	20
11	Stourport	15	5	4	6	27	25	2	19
12	Isca	15	6	0	9	20	37	-17	18
13	Harborne	15	4	2	9	18	36	-18	14
14	Wakefield	15	3	4	8	14	29	-15	13
15	Cambridge City	15	3	1	11	12	32	-20	10
16	Warrington	15	0	1	14	10	44	-34	1

= Champions
= Qualified for League Cup tournament
= Relegated

== Men's League Cup Tournament ==
Round	Date	Team 1	Team 2	Score
Semi-final	Mar 19	Havant	Hounslow	1-2
Semi-final	Mar 19	Southgate	Old Loughtonians	4-2
Final	April 1	Hounslow	Southgate	2-2 (4-3 p)

Hounslow
Veryan Pappin, Simon Hazlitt, Mike Williamson (Tony Diamond sub), Guy Swayne, Jon Potter, David Hacker, Nick Gordon, Andy Ferns, Jon Rees, Robert Thompson, Martyn Grimley
Southgate
Simon Rees, Peter Boxell, Richard Dodds, Mike Spray, James Duthie, Nick Clark, Robert Clift, Steve Batchelor, Paul Moulton (Soma Singh sub), Rupert Welch, Sean Kerly

== Men's Nationwide Anglia Cup (Hockey Association Cup) ==
=== Quarter-finals ===
Team 1	Team 2	Score
Hounslow	Slough	3-2
Bromley	Old Loughtonians	2-1 aet
Isca	Teddington	2-0
Havant	Neston	5-1

=== Semi-finals ===
Team 1	Team 2	Score
Bromley	Havant	1-0
Hounslow	Isca	2-0

=== Final ===
(Held at Old Loughtonians, Chigwell on 12 March)

Team 1	Team 2	Score
Hounslow	Bromley	2-1

Hounslow
Veryan Pappin, Simon Hazlitt, Mike Williamson, Jon Potter, Guy Swayne, Jon Rees, David Hacker, Martyn Grimley, Andy Ferns, Robert Thompson, Parmi Soor
Bromley
Craig Winter, Miles Richards, Andy King, Jon Gurney, Graeme Barnett, David Coombes, Matthew Cross, Mark Hunnisett, Neil Berry, Darren Willis, Jimmy Henderson

== Women's Cup (National Club Championship finals) ==
(Held at Southampton from 22–23 April)

=== Group A ===
Pos	Team	P	W	D	L	Pts
1	Sutton Coldfield	4	3	1	0	10
2	Great Harwood	4	1	2	1	5
3	Chelmsford	4	1	1	2	4
4	Bracknell	4	1	1	2	4
5	Redland	4	0	3	1	3

=== Group B ===
Pos	Team	P	W	D	L	Pts
1	Ealing	4	2	2	0	8
2	Hightown	4	2	2	0	8
3	Leicester	4	1	2	1	5
4	Clifton	4	1	2	1	5
5	Orpington	4	0	0	4	0

= Qualified for semi-finals

=== Semi-finals & Final ===
Round	Team 1	Team 2	Score
Semi-final	Ealing	Hightown	7-0
Semi-final	Sutton Coldfield	Great Harwood	4-1
Final	Ealing	Sutton Coldfield	1-0
