= 2005–06 England Hockey League season =

English field hockey season

2005–06 England Hockey League

The 2005–06 English Hockey League season took place from September 2005 until June 2006.

The men's title was won by Cannock for the fourth consecutive year with the women's title going to Leicester. There were no playoffs to determine champions after the regular season but there was a competition for the top four clubs called the Super Cup which was held at Cannock Hockey Club from June 16–18.

The Men's Cup was won by Reading and the Women's Cup was won by Bowdon Hightown.

== Men's Premier Division League standings ==
Pos	Team	P	W	D	L	F	A	GD	Pts
1	Cannock	18	17	1	0	86	22	64	52
2	Surbiton	18	14	1	3	74	40	34	43
3	Reading	18	12	2	4	50	28	22	38
4	Loughborough Students	18	11	2	5	62	42	20	35
5	Hampstead and Westminster	18	6	4	8	39	52	-13	22
6	East Grinstead	18	6	3	9	41	63	-22	21
7	Guildford	18	4	3	11	41	50	-19	15
8	Canterbury	18	3	4	11	42	57	-15	13
9	Old Loughtonians	18	2	6	10	48	68	-20	12
10	Chelmsford	18	0	4	14	39	100	-61	4

= Champions
= Qualified for Super Cup
= Relegated

=== Results ===
Home \ Away	Can	Can	Che	EG	Gui	HW	Lou	Olo	Rea	Sub
Cannock	—	3–1	11–0	7–2	3–2	8–0	4–0	6–5	4–2	5–0
Canterbury	2–3	—	2–2	4–4	4–3	1–3	1–2	4–4	1–3	4–6
Chelmsford	1–7	2–6	—	4–5	2–4	0–3	3–7	5–5	1–8	0–5
East Grinstead	0–4	0–3	6–5	—	3–2	3–2	1–2	3–2	1–1	3–4
Guildford	2–4	6–1	3–3	3–0	—	1–4	0–4	0–0	0–1	2–4
Hampstead and Westminster	1–3	2–1	4–4	1–3	3–3	—	2–3	3–3	5–4	1–4
Loughborough Students	2–5	3–2	9–1	6–2	5–3	2–2	—	5–3	1–2	3–3
Old Loughtonians	0–4	3–3	5–3	3–3	3–4	3–0	1–3	—	0–2	3–7
Reading	1–1	2–1	5–2	5–1	3–2	1–2	3–2	4–1	—	1–2
Surbiton	1–4	6–1	5–1	5–1	3–1	5–1	4–3	9–4	1–2	—

Legend: Blue = home team win; Yellow = draw; Red = away team win.

== Women's Premier Division League standings ==
Pos	Team	P	W	D	L	F	A	Pts
1	Leicester	18	13	2	3	43	16	41
2	Canterbury	18	10	5	3	41	23	35
3	Olton & West Warwicks	18	11	1	6	54	39	34
4	Bowdon Hightown	18	10	2	6	50	37	32
5	Slough	18	9	3	6	51	36	30
6	Ipswich	18	9	3	6	48	38	30
7	Chelmsford	18	7	5	6	40	35	26
8	Doncaster	18	2	4	12	34	66	10
9	Old Loughtonians	18	2	3	13	30	54	9
10	Clifton	18	2	2	14	24	67	8

= Champions
= Qualified for Super Cup
= Relegated

== Men's Super Cup standings ==
Pos	Team	P	W	D	L	F	A	Pts
1	Reading	3	2	0	1	9	9	6
2	Surbiton	3	1	2	0	10	8	5
3	Loughborough Students	3	1	1	1	7	7	4
4	Cannock	3	0	1	2	7	9	1

= Winners

== Women's Super Cup standings ==
Pos	Team	P	W	D	L	F	A	Pts
1	Leicester	3	2	1	0	10	6	7
2	Canterbury	3	2	1	0	7	5	7
3	Olton & West Warwicks	3	1	0	2	5	7	3
4	Bowdon Hightown	3	0	0	3	7	11	0

= Winners

== Men's Cup ==
=== Quarter-finals ===
Team 1	Team 2	Score
Univ of Birmingham	East Grinstead	2-4
Beeston	Guildford	1-1 (3-0 p)
Hampstead & Westminster	Reading	0-2
Southgate	Cannock	4-3

=== Semi-finals ===
Team 1	Team 2	Score
Beeston	Reading	1-3
East Grinstead	Southgate	6-2

=== Final ===
(Held at the Reading on 2 April)

Team 1	Team 2	Score
Reading	East Grinstead	5-2

== Women's Cup ==
=== Quarter-finals ===
Team 1	Team 2	Score
Slough	Canterbury	2-0
Doncaster	Ipswich	
Bowdon Hightown	Trojans	5-1
Chelmsford	Horsham	5-0

=== Semi-finals ===
Team 1	Team 2	Score
Bowdon Hightown	Slough	3-3 (4-2 p)
Doncaster	Chelmsford	1-1 (1-3 p)

=== Final ===
(Held at Reading on 2 April)

Team 1	Team 2	Score
Bowdon Hightown	Chelmsford	5-0
