= 2010–11 England Hockey League season =

English field hockey season

2010–11 England Hockey League

The 2010–11 English Hockey League season took place from September 2010 until April 2011. The Men's Championship was won by Beeston and the Women's Championship was won by Reading.

The Men's Cup was won by Beeston and the Women's Cup was won by Leicester.

== Men's Premier Division League Standings ==
Pos	Team	P	W	D	L	F	A	GD	Pts
1	East Grinstead	18	14	3	1	77	30	42	45
2	Beeston	18	11	1	6	47	33	14	34
3	Surbiton	18	11	1	6	47	40	7	34
4	Reading	18	8	3	7	43	38	5	27
5	Bowdon	18	7	5	6	34	34	0	26
6	Hampstead and Westminster	18	7	3	8	38	42	-4	24
7	Loughborough Students	18	7	2	9	43	46	-3	23
8	Cannock	18	4	5	9	36	54	-18	16*
9	Canterbury	18	3	4	11	35	58	-23	13
10	Brooklands Manchester University	18	3	3	12	20	45	-25	12

= Qualified for Semi-final play off
= Qualified for round one play off
= Relegated

=== Results ===
Home \ Away	Bee	Bow	Bro	Can	Can	EG	HW	Lou	Rea	Sub
Beeston	—	3–0	6–2	3–0	5–3	1–5	0–2	3–0	1–0	6–2
Bowdon	1–2	—	4–0	0–5	3–2	3–3	2–2	3–1	4–1	1–2
Brooklands MU	0–2	0–1	—	1–0	2–3	0–4	1–3	2–2	2–1	1–0
Cannock	3–1	1–1	1–1	—	4–4	3–6	2–4	0–2	1–1	3–2
Canterbury	2–2	2–3	2–1	2–5	—	0–4	0–2	0–4	3–5	2–4
East Grinstead	2–0	3–3	3–0	7–1	3–3	—	4–1	4–3	8–1	4–2
Hampstead and Westminster	2–3	1–3	2–1	6–2	2–2	2–4	—	1–2	1–1	3–1
Loughborough Students	1–4	4–1	3–3	4–1	2–3	3–6	5–2	—	1–4	0–2
Reading	2–1	0–0	6–2	8–3	3–1	3–2	3–0	2–3	—	2–3
Surbiton	6–4	2–1	2–1	1–1	4–1	1–5	6–2	5–3	2–0	—

Legend: Blue = home team win; Yellow = draw; Red = away team win.

== Play Offs ==
Match	Date	Team 1	Team 2	Score	Scorers
Round one	2 Apr	Reading	Bowdon	2-1	
Semi-finals	3 Apr	East Grinstead	Reading	3-2	
Semi-finals	3 Apr	Beeston	Surbiton	2-1	
Final	9 Apr	Beeston	East Grinstead	2-1	Stephen Lawrence, Ben Arnold/

== Women's Premier Division League Standings ==
Pos	Team	P	W	D	L	F	A	Pts
1	Leicester	18	13	3	2	51	12	42
2	Canterbury	18	13	1	4	50	19	40
3	Reading	18	12	0	6	50	27	36
4	Bowdon Hightown	18	10	2	6	34	31	32
5	Slough	18	9	3	6	28	27	30
6	University of Birmingham	18	8	1	9	36	39	25
7	Clifton	18	6	2	10	29	37	20
8	Cannock	18	4	3	11	40	60	15
9	Olton & West Warwicks	18	4	3	11	32	63	15
10	Brooklands Poynton	18	1	2	15	21	56	5

= Qualified for Semi-final play off
= Qualified for round one play off
= Relegated

== Play Offs ==
Match	Date	Team 1	Team 2	Score
Round one	Apr 2	Bowdon Hightown	Slough	2-1
Semi-finals	Apr 3	Reading	Canterbury	1-0
Semi-finals	Apr 3	Leicester	Bowdon Hightown	5-1
Final	Apr 9	Reading	Leicester	3-2

== Men's Cup ==
=== Quarter-finals ===
Team 1	Team 2	Score
Hampstead & Westminster	Old Loughtonians	4-0
Cannock	Univ of Birmingham	3-1
Doncaster	Chelmsford	4-2
Beeston	Reading	w/o

=== Semi-finals ===
Team 1	Team 2	Score
Beeston	Hampstead & Westminster	5-2
Doncaster	Cannock	3-0

=== Final ===
(Held at the Cannock on 14 May)

Team 1	Team 2	Score
Beeston	Doncaster	6-2

== Women's Cup ==
=== Quarter-finals ===
Team 1	Team 2	Score
Sutton Coldfield	Clifton	4-2
Surbiton	Reading	3-2
Bowdon Hightown	Olton & West Warwick	4-1
Univ of Birmingham	Buckingham	2-1 aet

=== Semi-finals ===
Team 1	Team 2	Score
Surbiton	Sutton Coldfield	3-2
Bowdon Hightown	Univ of Birmingham	2-0

=== Final ===
(Held at Cannock on 14 May)

Team 1	Team 2	Score
Bowdon Hightown	Surbiton	4-1
