= 1985–86 England Hockey League season =

English field hockey season

1985–86 England Hockey League

The 1985–86 English Hockey League season took place from September 1985 until May 1986.

The season culminated in the National Inter League Championship for men which brought together the winners of their respective regions. The Men's championship was won by East Grinstead

The Men's Hockey Association Cup was won by Southgate and the Women's Cup (National Club Championship finals) was won by Slough.

== Men's National Inter League Championship finals ==
(Held at Prescot, Merseyside, May 3–4)

=== Group A ===
Team 1	Team 2	Score
Hounslow	Cambridge City	1-1
Hounslow	Isca	0-0
Cambridge City	Isca	1-1

Pos	Team	P	W	D	L	F	A	Pts
1	Cambridge City	2	0	2	0	2	2	2
2	Isca	2	0	2	0	1	1	2
3	Hounslow	2	0	2	0	1	1	2

=== Group B ===
Team 1	Team 2	Score
Welton	Bournville	1-2
Bournville	East Grinstead	1-1
East Grinstead	Welton	1-0

Pos	Team	P	W	D	L	F	A	Pts
1	Bournville	2	1	1	0	3	2	4
2	East Grinstead	2	1	1	0	2	1	4
3	Welton	2	0	0	2	1	3	0

= Qualified for semi-finals

=== Semi-finals & Final ===
Round	Team 1	Team 2	Score
Semi-final	East Grinstead	Cambridge City	2-0
Semi-final	Isca	Bournville	1-0
Final	East Grinstead	Isca	1-0

== Men's Cup (Hockey Association Cup) ==
=== Quarter-finals ===
Team 1	Team 2	Score
Bournville	Isca	Mar 23
Welton	Southgate	2-7
Bishop's Stortford	Pickwick	Mar 23
Lewes	Cannock	Mar 23

=== Semi-finals ===
Team 1	Team 2	Score
Isca	Pickwick	Apr 19
Cannock	Southgate	Apr 19

=== Final ===
(Held at Willesden Sports Centre on 20 April)

Team 1	Team 2	Score
Southgate	Pickwick	3-0

== Women's Cup (National Club Championship finals) ==
=== Groups ===
(Held at Peterborough, April 19–20), Pool 1 was won by Ealing and Pool 2 was won by Slough.

=== Semi-finals ===
Team 1	Team 2	Score
Ealing	Orpington	Apr 27
Slough	Ipswich	Apr 27

=== Final ===
(Held at University of Essex, April 27)

Round	Team 1	Team 2	Score
Final	Slough	Ealing	1-1 (5-3 p)
