= 1999–2000 England Hockey League season =

English field hockey season

1999–2000 England Hockey League

The 1999–2000 English Hockey League season took place from September 1999 until May 2000.

The men's National League was won by Canterbury with the women's National League going to Hightown. The top four clubs entered the Premiership tournament which culminated with men's & women's finals on 1 May. Cannock won the men's Premiership tournament and Hightown claimed the women's Premiership tournament.

The Men's Cup was won by Reading and the Women's Cup was won by Clifton.

== Men's National League Premier Division League Standings ==
Pos	Team	P	W	D	L	F	A	GD	Pts
1	Canterbury	18	13	2	3	68	43	25	41
2	Cannock	18	13	1	4	62	35	27	40
3	Reading	18	12	3	3	71	37	34	39
4	Guildford	18	10	3	5	53	43	10	33
5	Surbiton	18	7	4	7	46	44	2	25
6	Old Loughtonians	18	5	8	5	46	46	0	23
7	Southgate	18	4	2	12	38	52	-14	14
8	Bournville	18	4	2	12	34	55	-21	14
9	Teddington	18	3	5	10	35	64	-29	14
10	Beeston	18	3	2	13	36	70	-34	11

= Champions
= Qualified for Premiership tournament
= Relegated

== Women's National League Premier Division League Standings ==
Pos	Team	P	W	D	L	F	A	Pts
1	Hightown	18	13	1	4	49	21	40
2	Ipswich	18	10	4	4	53	36	34
3	Leicester	18	9	6	3	38	22	33
4	Canterbury	18	9	3	6	36	29	30
5	Clifton	18	9	2	7	28	25	29
6	Slough	18	7	5	6	40	35	26
7	Sutton Coldfield	18	6	3	9	30	43	21
8	Olton & West Warwicks	18	5	5	8	31	41	20
9	Chelmsford	18	4	5	9	26	36	17
10	Doncaster	18	1	0	17	12	55	3

= Champions
= Qualified for Premiership tournament
= Relegated

== Men's Premiership Tournament ==
Round	Date	Team 1	Team 2	Score
First round	Apr 8	Guildford	Reading	2-2 (5-4 p)
Positional	Apr 8	Canterbury	Cannock	0-1
Second round	Apr 16	Canterbury	Guildford	5-1
Final	May 1	Cannock	Canterbury	3-2

== Women's Premiership Tournament ==
Round	Date	Team 1	Team 2	Score
First round	Apr 8	Leicester	Canterbury	2-0
Positional	Apr 8	Hightown	Ipswich	0-0 (4-2 p)
Second round	Apr 16	Ipswich	Leicester	2-1
Final	May 1	Hightown	Ipswich	3-1

== Men's Cup (EHA Cup) ==
=== Semi-finals ===
Team 1	Team 2	Score
Canterbury	Reading	1-3
Old Loughtonians	Southgate	6-3

=== Final ===
(Held at the National Hockey Stadium (Milton Keynes) on 7 May)

Team 1	Team 2	Score
Reading	Old Loughtonians	3-2

== Women's Cup (EHA Cup) ==
=== Quarter-finals ===
Team 1	Team 2	Score
Loughborough Students	Wimbledon	4-2
Clifton	Doncaster	5-0
Slough	Sutton Coldfield	0-1
Chelmsford	Hampton In Arden	5-1

=== Semi-finals ===
Team 1	Team 2	Score
Chelmsford	Clifton	1-3
Loughborough Students	Sutton Coldfield	4-5

=== Final ===
(Held at National Hockey Stadium (Milton Keynes) on 7 May)

Team 1	Team 2	Score
Clifton	Sutton Coldfield	4-2
