= 2000–01 England Hockey League season =

English field hockey season

2000–01 England Hockey League

The 2000–01 English Hockey League season took place from September 2000 until April 2001.

The men's title was won by Reading with the women's title going to Leicester. There were no playoffs to determine champions after the regular season but there was a competition for the top four clubs called the Premiership tournament which culminated with men's & women's finals on 22 April. Surbiton won the men's Premiership tournament and Slough claimed the women's premiership tournament.

The Men's Cup was won by Guildford and the Women's Cup was won by Slough.

== Men's Premier Division League Standings ==
Pos	Team	P	W	D	L	F	A	GD	Pts
1	Reading	18	14	2	2	50	23	27	44
2	Surbiton	18	12	3	3	62	36	26	39
3	Cannock	18	12	1	5	65	36	29	37
4	Guildford	18	7	3	8	35	41	-6	24
5	Old Loughtonians	18	7	2	9	29	41	-12	23
6	Southgate	18	6	4	8	47	50	-3	22
7	Loughborough Students	18	5	4	9	41	44	-3	19
8	Canterbury	18	5	4	9	34	46	-12	19
9	Teddington	18	3	6	9	30	47	-17	15
10	Bournville	18	4	1	13	34	63	-29	13

= Champions
= Qualified for Premiership tournament
= Relegated

== Women's Premier Division League Standings ==
Pos	Team	P	W	D	L	F	A	Pts
1	Leicester	18	12	2	4	37	21	38
2	Ipswich	18	11	4	3	37	25	37
3	Slough	18	10	2	6	54	35	32
4	Clifton	18	10	2	6	27	22	32
5	Olton & West Warwicks	18	8	4	6	31	27	28
6	Canterbury	18	6	5	7	23	25	23
7	Hightown	18	5	5	8	35	39	20
8	Chelmsford	18	4	5	9	20	29	17
9	Sutton Coldfield	18	3	4	11	19	49	13
10	Loughborough Students	18	3	3	12	35	46	12

= Champions
= Qualified for Premiership tournament
= Relegated

== Men's Premiership Tournament ==
Round	Date	Team 1	Team 2	Score
First round	Apr 7	Cannock	Guildford	3-3 (4-5 p)
Positional	Apr 7	Reading	Surbiton	2-3
Second round	Apr 8	Guildford	Reading	1-0
Final	Apr 22	Surbiton	Guildford	1-0

== Women's Premiership Tournament ==
Round	Date	Team 1	Team 2	Score
First round	Apr 7	Slough	Clifton	1-1 (4-2 p)
Positional	Apr 7	Ipswich	Leicester	1-0
Second round	Apr 8	Slough	Leicester	2-0
Final	Apr 22	Slough	Ipswich	3-1

== Men's Cup (EHA Cup) ==
=== Quarter-finals ===
Team 1	Team 2	Score
St.Albans	Reading	2-4
Guildford	Southgate	2-0
Teddington	Canterbury	2-3
Chelmsford	Surbiton	3-9

=== Semi-finals ===
Team 1	Team 2	Score
Reading	Surbiton	1-0
Guildford	Canterbury	3-2

=== Final ===
(Held at the National Hockey Stadium (Milton Keynes) on 25 March)

Team 1	Team 2	Score
Guildford	Reading	2-1 aet

== Women's Cup (EHA Cup) ==
=== Quarter-finals ===
Team 1	Team 2	Score
Hightown	Canterbury	1-0
Olton & West Warwick	Clifton	2-1
Loughborough Students	Slough	2-3
Sutton Coldfield	Doncaster	3-2

=== Semi-finals ===
Team 1	Team 2	Score
Olton & West Warwick	Hightown	2-0
Slough	Sutton Coldfield	2-1

=== Final ===
(Held at National Hockey Stadium (Milton Keynes) on 25 March)

Team 1	Team 2	Score
Slough	Olton & West Warwick	3-2
