= 2009–10 England Hockey League season =

Hockey competition series

2009–10 England Hockey League

The 2009–10 English Hockey League season took place from September 2009 until May 2010. The Men's Championship was won by East Grinstead and the Women's Championship was won by Slough.

The Men's Cup was won by Beeston and the Women's Cup was won by Leicester.

== Men's Premier Division League Standings ==
Pos	Team	P	W	D	L	F	A	GD	Pts
1	Reading	18	12	5	1	49	26	23	41
2	East Grinstead	18	10	5	3	69	48	21	35
3	Surbiton	18	10	3	5	59	47	12	33
4	Beeston	18	7	7	4	45	36	9	28
5	Loughborough Students	18	6	5	7	30	35	-5	23
6	Hampstead and Westminster	18	7	2	9	30	39	-9	23
7	Cannock	18	5	4	9	43	45	-2	19
8	Bowdon	18	4	7	7	41	44	-3	19
9	Brooklands Manchester University	18	4	3	11	31	50	-19	15
10	University of Exeter	18	3	3	12	26	53	-27	12

= Qualified for Semi-final play off
= Qualified for round one play off
= Relegated

=== Results ===
Home \ Away	Bee	Bow	Bro	Can	EG	HW	Lou	Rea	Sub	UoE
Beeston	—	3–1	3–0	1–1	4–4	5–2	1–1	0–0	5–1	2–2
Bowdon	2–2	—	4–1	2–2	3–6	0–1	3–0	2–2	3–4	1–1
Brooklands MU	1–2	2–5	—	2–3	2–1	0–1	3–0	1–1	0–4	1–0
Cannock	3–4	3–3	5–2	—	3–4	2–1	2–0	2–6	1–2	0–2
East Grinstead	1–1	2–2	8–5	5–3	—	6–2	2–2	2–3	5–5	6–3
Hampstead and Westminster	3–0	2–0	2–2	5–4	0–3	—	2–3	2–2	2–5	1–0
Loughborough Students	4–2	2–4	1–1	1–1	3–4	2–0	—	2–0	2–4	3–0
Reading	3–2	2–1	6–2	1–0	5–4	2–0	4–0	—	3–2	4–3
Surbiton	6–4	7–3	1–4	4–2	1–4	2–1	1–1	1–1	—	6–2
University of Exeter	1–4	2–2	3–2	0–6	1–2	1–3	1–3	0–4	4–3	—

Legend: Blue = home team win; Yellow = draw; Red = away team win.

== Play Offs ==
Match	Date	Team 1	Team 2	Score
Round one	Apr 24	Beeston	Loughborough Students	3-1
Semi-finals	Apr 25	East Grinstead	Surbiton	5-1
Semi-finals	Apr 25	Beeston	Reading	2-1
Final	May 3	East Grinstead	Beeston	4-4 (4-3 p)

== Women's Premier Division League Standings ==
Pos	Team	P	W	D	L	F	A	Pts
1	Leicester	18	17	1	0	64	9	52
2	Reading	18	13	3	2	56	27	42
3	Slough	18	12	4	2	51	23	40
4	University of Birmingham	18	7	3	8	38	41	24
5	Canterbury	18	6	4	8	40	32	22
6	Olton & West Warwicks	18	6	4	8	24	37	22
7	Brooklands Poynton	18	6	1	11	27	43	19
8	Bowdon Hightown	18	5	3	10	36	45	18
9	Clifton	18	4	2	12	22	47	14
10	Trojans	18	1	1	16	10	64	4

= Qualified for Semi-final play off
= Qualified for round one play off
= Relegated

== Play Offs ==
Match	Date	Team 1	Team 2	Score
Round one	Apr 24	Canterbury	University of Birmingham	5-3
Semi-finals	Apr 25	Slough	Reading	2-1
Semi-finals	Apr 25	Leicester	Canterbury	2-1
Final	May 1	Slough	Leicester	1-0

== Men's Cup ==
=== Quarter-finals ===
Team 1	Team 2	Score
Sevenoaks	Univ of Birmingham	0-0 (5-4 p)
Brooklands MU	Olton & West Warwick	4-2
Hampstead & Westminster	Old Loughtonians	4-1
Beeston	Doncaster	2-0

=== Semi-finals ===
Team 1	Team 2	Score
Beeston	Brooklands MU	1-0
Hampstead & Westminster	Sevenoaks	2-1

=== Final ===
(Held at the Highfields Hockey Centre, Nottingham on 15 May)

Team 1	Team 2	Score
Beeston	Hampstead & Westminster	2-1

== Women's Cup ==
=== Quarter-finals ===
Team 1	Team 2	Score
Leicester	Surbiton	6-2
Reading	Sunderland	6-0
Trojans	Dereham	w/o
Univ of Birmingham	Sutton Coldfield	6-3

=== Semi-finals ===
Team 1	Team 2	Score
Reading	Trojans	4-1
Leicester	Univ of Birmingham	4-0

=== Final ===
(Held at Highfields Hockey Centre, Nottingham on 15 May)

Team 1	Team 2	Score
Leicester	Reading	2-1
