= 1998–99 England Hockey League season =

English field hockey season

1998–99 England Hockey League

The 1998–99 English Hockey League season took place from October 1998 until May 1999.

The men's National League was won by Cannock with the women's National League going to Slough. The top four clubs entered the newly introduced Premiership play off tournament which culminated with men's & women's finals on 3 May. Cannock won the men's Premiership tournament and Slough claimed the women's Premiership tournament.

The Men's Hockey Association Cup was won by Reading and the Women's Cup (AEWHA Cup) was won by Slough.

== Men's National League Premier Division League Standings ==
Pos	Team	P	W	D	L	F	A	GD	Pts
1	Cannock	22	16	4	2	87	37	50	52
2	Southgate	22	15	2	5	62	50	12	47
3	Reading	22	13	4	5	77	49	28	43
4	Canterbury	22	13	3	6	87	60	27	42
5	Beeston	22	11	5	6	61	46	15	38
6	Teddington	22	11	3	8	67	54	13	36
7	Old Loughtonians	22	9	3	10	76	77	-1	30
8	Guildford	22	9	3	10	71	91	-20	30
9	Bournville	22	6	6	10	50	68	-18	24
10	Hounslow	22	3	6	13	38	63	-25	15
11	East Grinstead	22	2	3	17	52	87	-35	9
12	Brooklands	22	2	2	18	42	88	-46	8

= Champions
= Qualified for Premiership tournament
= Relegated

== Women's National League Premier Division League Standings ==
Pos	Team	P	W	D	L	F	A	Pts
1	Slough	14	10	2	2	53	25	32
2	Ipswich	14	9	2	3	36	20	29
3	Hightown	14	5	8	1	28	22	23
4	Clifton	14	7	2	5	27	21	23
5	Olton & West Warwicks	14	4	5	5	27	34	17
6	Leicester	14	4	2	8	26	34	14
7	Sutton Coldfield	14	3	1	10	19	38	10
8	Doncaster	14	2	2	10	23	45	8

= Champions
= Qualified for Premiership tournament

== Men's Premiership Tournament ==
Round	Date	Team 1	Team 2	Score
First round	Apr 17	Reading	Canterbury	8-2
Positional	Apr 17	Cannock	Southgate	1-0
Second round	Apr 18	Reading	Southgate	4-2
Final	May 3	Cannock	Reading	4-4 (4-3 p)

== Women's Premiership Tournament ==
Round	Date	Team 1	Team 2	Score
First round	Apr 17	Clifton	Hightown	2-1
Positional	Apr 17	Slough	Ipswich	2-1
Second round	Apr 18	Clifton	Ipswich	4-2
Final	May 3	Slough	Clifton	4-2

== Men's Cup (Hockey Association Cup) ==
=== Quarter-finals ===
Team 1	Team 2	Score
Southgate	Hounslow	8-3
Reading	Canterbury	5-2
Cannock	Lewes	4-3
Old Loughtonians	Teddington	3-2

=== Semi-finals ===
Team 1	Team 2	Score
Old Loughtonians	Reading	0-4
Cannock	Southgate	2-0

=== Final ===
(Held at the National Hockey Stadium (Milton Keynes) on 9 May)

Team 1	Team 2	Score
Reading	Cannock	4-4 aet (5-4 p)

== Women's Cup (AEWHA Cup) ==
=== Quarter-finals ===
Team 1	Team 2	Score
Hightown	Olton & West Warwick	1-2
Leicester	Clifton	4-0
Chelmsford	Bradford	2-1
Slough	Doncaster	7-1

=== Semi-finals ===
Team 1	Team 2	Score
Leicester	Clifton	1-0
Slough	Chelmsford	4-0

=== Final ===
(Held at National Hockey Stadium (Milton Keynes) on 16 May)

Team 1	Team 2	Score
Slough	Leicester	4-3

Slough
L Smith, Alison Burd, Sue Chandler (capt), Ashleigh Wallace, Julie Robertson, Karen Brown, Fiona Greenham, Sarah Kelleher, Jane Smith, Mandy Nicholson, Anna Bennett subs Lesley Hobley, Monique Slootmaekers, L Williams
Leicester
A Claxton, S Naylor, Emma Newbold, Joanne Mould, Tina Dullaghan, Carol Voss, Helen Richardson, Kirsty Bowden, Sarah Blanks, Lucy Beavon, Purdy Miller subs V Knott
