= 2007–08 England Hockey League season =

English field hockey season

2007–08 England Hockey League

The 2007–08 English Hockey League season took place from September 2007 until April 2008. The league was sponsored by Slazenger and the men's title was won by Reading with the women's title going to Slough. There were no playoffs during the season.

The Men's Cup was won by Beeston and the Women's Cup was won by Leicester.

== Men's Slazenger Premier Division League Standings ==
Pos	Team	P	W	D	L	F	A	GD	Pts
1	Reading	18	15	1	2	59	26	33	46
2	East Grinstead	18	12	2	4	77	46	31	38
3	Cannock	18	11	1	6	55	38	17	34
4	Havant	18	8	2	8	73	71	2	26
5	Bowdon	18	8	2	8	44	48	-4	26
6	Surbiton	18	8	0	10	38	48	-10	24
7	Beeston	18	6	3	9	45	57	-12	21
8	Loughborough Students	18	8	2	8	42	38	4	16*+
9	Hampstead and Westminster	18	3	5	10	31	49	-18	12*
10	Canterbury	18	2	0	16	31	74	-43	6

- + deducted 2 points for fielding a de-registered player
- * deducted 2 points for fielding an ineligible player

= Champions
= Relegated

=== Results ===
Home \ Away	Bee	Bow	Can	Can	EG	HW	Hav	Lou	Rea	Sub
Beeston	—	0–1	2–1	5–4	5–6	1–2	5–5	0–6	2–7	3–2
Bowdon	1–1	—	1–4	5–2	4–8	5–0	5–2	1–2	1–4	2–1
Cannock	6–2	3–4	—	4–2	1–2	1–1	5–4	2–0	0–3	2–3
Canterbury	2–5	2–0	2–3	—	2–6	3–5	5–8	1–0	0–2	0–1
East Grinstead	4–6	6–2	3–0	8–1	—	3–3	6–3	3–2	2–3	0–3
Hampstead and Westminster	1–1	2–4	0–3	2–1	1–4	—	4–4	1–1	0–2	2–3
Havant	3–2	4–1	4–5	10–2	3–8	3–1	—	3–6	4–3	2–6
Loughborough Students	2–1	2–1	3–8	6–2	1–1	2–1	3–5	—	1–2	3–2
Reading	3–1	3–3	0–2	3–0	2–1	4–2	4–3	3–2	—	5–1
Surbiton	1–3	2–3	2–5	1–0	4–6	4–3	0–3	1–0	1–6	—

Legend: Blue = home team win; Yellow = draw; Red = away team win.

== Women's Slazenger Premier Division League Standings ==
Pos	Team	P	W	D	L	F	A	Pts
1	Slough	18	14	0	4	56	31	42
2	Bowdon Hightown	18	13	2	3	72	29	41
3	Leicester	18	9	6	3	53	27	33
4	Olton & West Warwicks	18	11	0	7	47	36	33
5	Canterbury	18	8	3	7	41	35	27
6	Clifton	18	8	2	8	44	46	26
7	Ipswich	18	4	4	10	31	53	16
8	Brooklands Poynton	18	4	3	11	27	45	15
9	Chelmsford	18	3	6	9	25	45	15
10	Old Loughtonians	18	1	4	13	15	64	7

= Champions
= Relegated

== Men's Cup ==
=== Quarter-finals ===
Team 1	Team 2	Score
Reading	Doncaster	5-2
Bowdon	Old Georgians	3-0
Havant	East Grinstead	2-1
Beeston	Holcombe	3-1

=== Semi-finals ===
Team 1	Team 2	Score
Beeston	Havant	5-2
Bowdon	Reading	3-1

=== Final ===
(Held at the Highfields Sports Club, Nottingham on 18 May)

Team 1	Team 2	Score
Beeston	Bowdon	4-3

== Women's Cup ==
=== Quarter-finals ===
Team 1	Team 2	Score
Barnes	Staines	1-1 (3-4 p)
Slough	Ipswich	7-1
Olton & West Warwick	Bowdon Hightown	3-4
Old Loughtonians	Leicester	0-1

=== Semi-finals ===
Team 1	Team 2	Score
Leicester	Staines	8-0
Slough	Bowdon Hightown	3-2

=== Final ===
(Held at Highfields Sports Club, Nottingham on 18 May)

Team 1	Team 2	Score
Leicester	Slough	1-0
