= Roly Brookeman =

British field hockey player (born 1952)

Personal information
- Born: 1952

Sport
- Sport: Field hockey
- Position: midfielder/winger
Senior career
Years	Team	Caps	Goals
1971-1973	Loughborough Colleges	-	-
1973–1975	Slough	-	-
1975–1976	Hounslow	-	-
1977–1985	Southgate	-	-
1985–1999	Canterbury	-	-
National team
Years	Team	Caps	Goals
–	England & Great Britain	98	-
Medal record
Field hockey
Representing Great Britain
Champions Trophy
Bronze medal – third place	1978 Lahore	Team competition

Roland H. Brookeman (born 1952) is a former British hockey international.

== Biography ==
In 1971 Brookeman was representing Leicestershire and the Midlands at county level and Loughborough Colleges. He was a teacher at Windsor Grammar School and joined Slough Hockey Club in the Men's England Hockey League, where he made his full England debut in March 1974.

While at Slough, he was selected by England for the 1975 Men's Hockey World Cup in Kuala Lumpur and the Great Britain squad for the 1976 Summer Olympics but the team failed to qualify for the latter.

Brookeman signed for Hounslow Hockey Club before joining Southgate Hockey Club where he won the 1977–78 league title and played in the 1978 Men's Hockey World Cup in Buenos Aires and was part of the bronze medal winning Great Britain team that competed at the inaugural 1978 Men's Hockey Champions Trophy, in Lahore, Pakistan.

Brookeman was selected for the Great Britain team for the 1980 Olympic Games in Moscow, but subsequently did not attend due to the boycott.

He played in his third World Cup at the 1982 Men's Hockey World Cup in Bombay. In 1985, after moving to North Kent he joined Canterbury Hockey Club.

Brookeman coached the England's U21s and then taught at Physical Education and English at St Edmund's School Canterbury.

In 2023, Brookeman was in the newspaper headlines, stating about his depression following a marriage break-up and subsequent sleeping rough.
