= Belper Hockey Club =

English field hockey club

- Full name: Belper Hockey Club
- League: Women's England Hockey League; Men's England Hockey League
- Founded: 1908; 118 years ago
- Home ground: Belper Meadows, Bridge Street, Belper, Derbyshire DE56 1BA

Belper Hockey Club is a field hockey club that is based at Belper Meadows in Belper, Derbyshire. The club was founded in 1908.

The club runs eight men's teams with the first XI playing in the Men's England Hockey League Division 1 North and six women's teams with the first XI playing in the Women's England Hockey League Division One North.

== Notable players ==
=== Women's internationals ===
- (England) Sabbie Heesh
- (England) Hollie Pearne-Webb
- (England) Anna Toman
