= Craig Parnham =

British field hockey player (born 1973)

Personal information
- Born: 13 July 1973 (age 53) Bridgnorth, Shropshire, England
- Height: 180 cm (5 ft 11 in)
- Weight: 80 kg (176 lb)

Sport
- Sport: Field hockey
Senior career
Years	Team	Caps	Goals
1988–1991	Bridgnorth	-	-
1991-1996	Stourport	-	-
1996–2004	Cannock	-	-
National team
Years	Team	Caps	Goals
2000–2004	GB	64	-
2001-2004	England	51	-
Medal record
Men's field hockey
Representing England
European Championship
Bronze medal – third place	2003 Barcelona	Team

Craig Daniel Parnham (born 13 July 1973 in ) is an English field hockey defender and coach. He represented Great Britain in two Summer Olympics in 2000 and 2004.

== Biography ==
Parnham played club hockey for Cannock in the Men's England Hockey League after being signed from Stourport Hockey Club in 1996. He made his debut for Great Britain in 2000, shortly before being included in the team for the 2000 Summer Olympics.

The following year he made his debut for England, where he was appointed captain.

He sustained a serious throat injury in August 2001, when he was caught in the throat by a flying stick while playing for England against Pakistan in Malaysia. Parnham was put into intensive care and surgeons considered a tracheotomy before deciding that an operation was required on his larynx.

Still at Cannock, he represented England at the 2002 Commonwealth Games in Manchester and at the 2004 Olympic Games in Athens, Parnham represented Great Britain for his second Olympics. In total, Parnham won 64 caps for Great Britain and 51 for England.

He is now a coach, and has taken the Great Britain women's team to the 2008 and 2012 Olympic Games. In January 2013 he was appointed head coach of the USA Women's National Team, a position he held until the end of 2016.
