= Ealing Hockey Club =

English field hockey club

Ealing Hockey Club is a field hockey club based at Perivale Lane in Greenford and at St.Augustine's Prior School, W5, Middlesex

The original club was formed in 1884 and gained notable success in the 1980s when the women's team won three successive National Clubs Competitions during the 1986–87 England Hockey League season, 1987–88 England Hockey League season and 1988–89 England Hockey League season. Former internationals include Sheila Harding-Cornwallis, Katie Dodd, Mandy Nicholson-Langridge and Joan Lewis.

The club was re-formed by TotalHockey (a coaching agency of England Hockey) in 2012 and runs a ladies team who play in the Middlesex League. The club principally concentrated on the development of junior teams but is now growing an adult section. 2019 the club was handed to its members as a member owned not for profit community amateur sports club.

The club had to be reformed because in 2000 it went out of existence after a merger with Hounslow to form the Hounslow and Ealing Hockey Club which itself then merged with the Barnes Hockey Club.

In the 2018/19 Ealing Hockey Club fielded a second Ladies team. Having both Ladies Team gained promotion Total Hockey gifted the club to its members as a member-owned / member-run amateur sports club. The 2019/20 season the club will field 3 ladies' teams and 1 men's team with the Ladies 2s being promoted to Division 1. The Junior section is now fielding 370 juniors with many going on to represent the county and the adult section.
