= Fareham Hockey Club =

British hockey club

- Full name: Fareham Hockey Club
- League: Men's England Hockey League; Women's South League
- Founded: 1900
- Home ground: The Henry Cort Community College, Hillson Drive, Fareham PO15 6PH

Fareham Hockey Club is a field hockey club that is based at The Henry Cort Community College, in Fareham, Hampshire. The founding of the club was in 1900 but it was in existence by 1902 when known as Fareham & District Hockey Club.

== Teams ==
The club runs seven men's teams with the 1XI playing in the Men's England Hockey League Conference West and three women's teams with the 1XI playing in the England Hockey National League Conference West. The Club also has a thriving junior section which has produced many players to go on and represent England at International Level.

== Major Honours ==
- 1982–83 Men's National League Runner-up
- 2019–20 Men's Cup Runner-Up
- 2024-25 Men’s England Hockey Tier 1 Plate Winners

== Notable players ==
=== Men's internationals ===
Extended content

| Player | Events/Notes | Ref |
|---|---|---|
| (England) Brian Purdy | debut 1968 | |

Key

- Oly = Olympic Games
- CG = Commonwealth Games
- WC = World Cup
- CT = Champions Trophy
- EC = European Championships
