= Stephen Batchelor (field hockey) =

British field hockey player (born 1961)

Steve Batchelor
Personal information
- Born: 22 June 1961 (age 65) Beare Green, Surrey, England
- Height: 180 cm (5 ft 11 in)
- Weight: 79 kg (174 lb)

Sport
- Sport: Field hockey
Senior career
| Years | Team | Caps | Goals |
| 1979–1982 | Hounslow | - | - |
| 1982–1990 | Southgate | - | - |
| 1992–1993 | East Grinstead | - | - |
| 1995–1996 | Richmond | - | - |
National team
| Years | Team | Caps | Goals |
| – | Great Britain | | - |
| – | England | | - |
Medal record
Men's field hockey
Representing Great Britain
Olympic Games
| Gold medal – first place | 1988 Seoul | Team competition |
| Bronze medal – third place | 1984 Los Angeles | Team competition |
Champions Trophy
| Silver medal – second place | 1985 Perth | Team competition |
Representing England
World Cup
| Silver medal – second place | 1986 London | Team competition |
European Championship
| Silver medal – second place | 1987 Moscow | Team |
| Bronze medal – third place | 1991 Paris | Team |

Stephen James Batchelor (born 22 June 1961) is an English former field hockey player who competed at three Olympic Games and won a gold medal at the 1988 Summer Olympics.

== Biography ==
Batchelor was born in Beare Green, Surrey and educated at Millfield School. He started playing club hockey for Hounslow Hockey Club in the Men's England Hockey League.

After signing for Southgate Hockey Club, he was selected to represent Great Britain the 1984 Olympic Games in Los Angeles, where he won a bronze medal in the field hockey tournament. He was part of the silver medal winning Great Britain team that competed at the 1985 Men's Hockey Champions Trophy in Perth, Australia.

Batchelor won silver with the England squad at the 1986 Hockey World Cup before winning gold at his second Olympics in Seoul in 1988. During the hockey tournament, Batchelor set up Imran Sherwani in the final against West Germany.

Still at Southgate, Batchelor represented England at the 1990 Men's Hockey World Cup but shortly afterwards in August 1990, signed to play for East Grinstead Hockey Club.

While at East Grinstead, he represented Great Britain at the 1992 Olympic Games in Barcelona, which was his third Olympics.

Batchelor had played international hockey for twelve years before retiring after the 1992 Olympics, although he did go on to become player coach at Richmond Hockey Club.

He is head of admissions at Cranleigh School, and coaches the U14 boys and girls hockey teams. He lives in Cranleigh and has four children with his wife Jackie.
