= Men's England Hockey League =

English field hockey league structure

- Current season, competition or edition: 2025–26 Men's England Hockey League season
- Sport: Field hockey
- Founded: 1974; 52 years ago
- First season: 1974–75
- Administrator: England Hockey
- No. of teams: 12 (Premier Division); 10 (Division 1 South); 10 (Division 1 North); 30 (Conference teams)
- Country: England
- Confederation: EHF (Europe)
- Most recent champion: Old Georgians (4th title) (2025–26)
- Most titles: Cannock (7 titles)
- Relegation to: Division One (North or South)
- Domestic cup: England Hockey Men's Championship Cup
- International cup: Euro Hockey League
- Website: Men's Hockey League

The Men's England Hockey League is a field hockey league organised by England Hockey that features men's teams from England and Wales.

== Format ==
=== Regular season ===
There are 62 teams in the league, the top tier consists of a Premier Division of twelve teams. Below this is tier two, which consists of two ten-team Division One regional teams (North and South). The third tier consists of three regional conferences North, West, and East, all consisting of ten teams. The teams play each other home and away during an 18 week season from September to April. The league has a winter break between December and February. The winners of the Premier Division regular season automatically qualify to play in the Euro Hockey League.

=== League Finals Weekend ===
The top four Premier Division teams from the regular season qualify for the League Finals Weekend. The team that wins this tournament will be overall champions of the Men's England Hockey League and will qualify to play in the Euro Hockey League. If the team finishing top of the Premier Division at the end of the regular season also wins the League Finals Weekend tournament, the tournament runners-up will qualify as England's second team in the Euro Hockey League.

== List of champions ==
The Men's National League was introduced for the first time in 1974–75.

Season	Champions	Runners Up
1974–75	Bedfordshire Eagles (1)	Southgate
1975–76	Slough (1)	Bury St Edmunds YMCA
1976–77	Southgate (1)	Bedfordshire Eagles
1977–78	Southgate (2)	Trojans
1978–79	Isca (1)	Westcliff
1979–80	Slough (2)	Westcliff
1980–81	Slough (3)	Westcliff
1981–82	Slough (4)	Cambridge City
1982–83	Slough (5)	Fareham
1983–84	Neston (1)	Lyons
1984–85	East Grinstead (1)	Slough
1985–86	East Grinstead (2)	Isca
1986–87	Slough (6)	Old Loughtonians
1987–88	Southgate (3)	Stourport
1988–89	Southgate (4)	Havant
1989–90	Hounslow (1)	East Grinstead
1990–91	Havant (1)	Indian Gymkhana
1991–92	Havant (2)	Hounslow
1992–93	Hounslow (2)	Southgate
1993–94	Havant (3)	Hounslow
1994–95	Teddington (1)	Reading
1995–96	Cannock (1)	Reading
1996–97	Reading (1)	Teddington
1997–98	Cannock (2)	Canterbury
1998–99	Cannock (3)	Southgate
1999–2000	Canterbury (1)	Cannock
2000–01	Reading (2)	Surbiton
2001–02	Reading (3)	Surbiton
2002–03	Cannock (4)	Reading
2003–04	Cannock (5)	Reading
2004–05	Cannock (6)	Reading
2005–06	Cannock (7)	Surbiton
2006–07	Reading (4)	Cannock
2007–08	Reading (5)	East Grinstead
2008–09	East Grinstead (2)	Reading
2009–10	East Grinstead (3)	Beeston
2010–11	Beeston (1)	East Grinstead
2011–12	Reading (6)	East Grinstead
2012–13	Beeston (2)	Surbiton
2013–14	Beeston (3)	East Grinstead
2014–15	Wimbledon (1)	East Grinstead
2015–16	Wimbledon (2)	Reading
2016–17	Surbiton (1)	Wimbledon
2017–18	Surbiton (2)	Hampstead & Westminster
2018–19	Hampstead & Westminster (1)	Surbiton
2019–20	Surbiton (3)	Hampstead & Westminster
2020–21	Cancelled due to COVID-19	
2021–22	Old Georgians (1)	Wimbledon
2022–23	Old Georgians (2)	Holcombe
2023–24	Old Georgians (3)	Surbiton
2024–25	Surbiton (4)	Old Georgians
2025–26	Old Georgians (4)	Wimbledon

== Champions ==
=== By club ===
Club	Championships	Runners-up	Winning seasons
Cannock	7	2	1995–96, 1997–98, 1998–99, 2002–03, 2003–04, 2004–05, 2005–06
Reading	6	7	1996–97, 2000–01, 2001–02, 2006–07, 2007–08, 2011–12
Slough	6	1	1975–76, 1979–80, 1980–81, 1981–82, 1982–83, 1986–87
East Grinstead	4	6	1984–85, 1985–86, 2008–09, 2009–10
Southgate	4	3	1976–77, 1977–78, 1987–88, 1988–89
Surbiton	4	6	2016–17, 2017–18, 2019–20, 2024-25
Old Georgians	4	1	2021–22, 2022–23, 2023-24, 2024-25
Havant	3	1	1990–91, 1991–92, 1993–94
Beeston	3	1	2010–11, 2012–13, 2013–14
Hounslow	2	2	1989–90, 1992–93
Wimbledon	2	1	2014–15, 2015–16
Hampstead & Westminster	1	2	2018–19
Bedfordshire Eagles	1	1	1974–75
Isca	1	1	1978–79
Teddington	1	1	1994–95
Canterbury	1	1	1999–2000
Neston	1	0	1983–84
Westcliff	0	2	
Bury St Edmunds YMCA	0	1	
Trojans	0	1	
Cambridge City	0	1	
Fareham	0	1	
Lyons	0	1	
Old Loughtonians	0	1	
Stourport	0	1	
Indian Gymkhana	0	1	
Holcombe	0	1	

=== By region ===
Region	Championships	Clubs
South East England	28	Reading (6), Slough (6), East Grinstead (4), Surbiton (4), Old Georgians (4), Havant (3), Canterbury (1)
Greater London	10	Southgate (4), Hounslow (2), Wimbledon (2), Teddington (1), Hampstead & Westminster (1)
West Midlands	7	Cannock (7)
East Midlands	3	Beeston (3)
South West England	1	Isca (1)
North West England	1	Neston (1)
East of England	1	Bedfordshire Eagles (1)

== Premiership Tournament/Super Cup winners ==
Season	Champions	Runners Up
1998–99	Cannock	Reading
1999–2000	Cannock	Canterbury
2000–01	Surbiton	Guildford
2001–02	Reading	Surbiton
2002–03	Reading	Loughborough Students
2003–04	Reading	Cannock
2004–05	Cannock	Reading
2005–06	Reading	Surbiton

== See also ==
- England Hockey Men's Championship Cup
- Women's England Hockey League
- England Hockey Women's Championship Cup
