= Nottingham Hockey Club =

Field hockey club

Nottingham Hockey Club is a field hockey club based at Goosedale Lane in Bestwood Village, Nottingham

The club was formed in 1919 with the merger of Notts Hockey Club and Notts Grosvenor and played at the Riverside pitch at Trent Bridge. The club moved to its current home at Goosedale Lane in 1937.

Nottingham run five men's sides with the first X1 featuring in the East Midlands Premier League. In addition to the senior men's teams the club also runs a ladies team, juniors and veterans.

The club has a strong history and won the 1976 Men's National Clubs Championship one year after finishing runner-up in the same event.
