= Paul Barber (field hockey) =

British field hockey player (born 1955)

Personal information
- Born: 21 May 1955 (age 71) Peterborough, England
- Height: 189 cm (6 ft 2 in)
- Weight: 85 kg (187 lb)

Sport
- Sport: Field hockey
- Position: left back
Senior career
| Years | Team | Caps | Goals |
| 1976–1979 | Peterborough Town | - | - |
| 1979–1993 | Slough | - | - |
National team
| Years | Team | Caps | Goals |
| – | Great Britain | 67 | - |
| – | England | 99 | - |
Medal record
Field hockey
Representing Great Britain
Olympic Games
| Gold medal – first place | 1988 Seoul | Team |
| Bronze medal – third place | 1984 Los Angeles | Team |
Champions Trophy
| Bronze medal – third place | 1978 Lahore | Team |
| Silver medal – second place | 1985 Perth | Team |
Representing England
World Cup
| Silver medal – second place | 1986 London | Team |
European Championship
| Silver medal – second place | 1987 Moscow | Team |

Paul Jason Barber (born 21 May 1955) is an English former field hockey player, who won a gold medal at the 1988 Summer Olympics.

== Biography ==
Barber was born in Peterborough, England, and was educated at King's School, Peterborough and Monkton Combe School in Bath. He played club hockey for his home town club, Peterborough Town Hockey Club and was the Peterborough Adveritser's sportsman of the year in 1977 and won a bronze medal with England at the 1978 European Cup, was part of the bronze medal winning Great Britain team that competed at the inaugural 1978 Men's Hockey Champions Trophy, in Lahore, Pakistan and played at the 1978 Men's Hockey World Cup. However, he signed to play for Slough Hockey Club in the Men's England Hockey League in 1979.

He was selected for the Great Britain team for 1980 Olympic Games but missed out due to the boycott of the Moscow Games. He did however play in the 1982 Men's Hockey World Cup and win a bronze medal at the 1984 Summer Olympics in Los Angeles. He was part of the silver medal winning Great Britain team that competed at the 1985 Men's Hockey Champions Trophy in Perth, Australia.

He also won silver with the England squad at the 1986 Men's Hockey World Cup in London, and scored both the goals in the semi-final that helped England defeat West Germany 2-1 and progress to the final.

He was vice-captain of the gold medal-winning Great Britain squad in the 1988 Summer Olympics in Seoul.

In a career that spanned over 25 years, Barber won 99 caps for England and 68 caps for Great Britain.

A player of uncompromising physicality and determination, he was recognised as one of the finest defenders and short corner strikers in the world. In 1983 Barber was awarded UK Hockey Player of the Year. Following the 1988 tournament, in which he scored 5 goals, Barber retired from international hockey at all levels, but continued to play for Slough Hockey Club until the early 1990s when he joined Newbury & Thatcham Hockey Club. He played on for several more years until retiring from all forms of hockey in 1998.

He lives in Bath with his wife, Jennie and has three sons, Michael, Stephen and Mark.
