= Cambridge City Hockey Club =

Field hockey club based at Wilberforce Road in Cambridge, England

- Full name: Cambridge City Hockey Club
- League: Men's England Hockey League; Women's England Hockey League
- Founded: 1906
- Home ground: The Olympic Dave Arena, Wilberforce Road, Cambridge, England

Cambridge City Hockey Club is a field hockey club based at Wilberforce Road in Cambridge, England. Facilities at the Wilberforce Road Sports Ground were expanded to include three artificial pitches in October 2018.

Founded in 1906, the club now runs seven men's teams, five women's teams, and a junior section. The men's first team play in the Men's England Hockey League and the women's first team play in the Women's England Hockey League. Former GB International Jon Peckett runs the Junior Academy.

== Major national honours ==
- 1981–82 Men's League Runner Up

== Notable players ==
=== Men's internationals ===
Extended content

Player	Events/Notes	Ref
(England) James Albery		
(Wales) Rhodri Furlong		
(England) Nick Thompson		
(England) David Wilman	Oly (1964, 1968)	

Key

- Oly = Olympic Games
- CG = Commonwealth Games
- WC = World Cup
- CT = Champions Trophy
- EC = European Championships

=== Women's internationals ===
Extended content

Player	Events/Notes	Ref
(England) Joanne Ellis		
(England) Katie Curtis		
(Wales) Becca Daniel		
(England) Helen Grant		
(Wales) Emma Griffiths		
(England) Tess Howard		
(Wales) Eloise Laity		
(England) Helen Richardson-Walsh		

Key

- Oly = Olympic Games
- CG = Commonwealth Games
- WC = World Cup
- CT = Champions Trophy
- EC = European Championships

== Other honours ==
- Best Marketing Campaign, England Hockey Awards, 2013
- CCHC 3rd XI - shortlisted for England Hockey Team of the Year 2018
- Living Sport Club of the Year 2014/15
- Shortlisted for England Hockey Club of the Year 2014/15
