= Balwant Singh Saini =

British field hockey player

Bal Saini
Personal information
- Born: 22 September 1949 (age 76) Kisumu, Kenya

Sport
- Sport: Field hockey
- Position: Forward
Senior career
| Years | Team | Caps | Goals |
| 1971–1973 | Impala | - | - |
| 1973–1974 | London Sikh Union | - | - |
| 1975–1982 | Slough | - | - |
| 1997–1998 | Indian Gymkhana | - | - |
National team
| Years | Team | Caps | Goals |
| 1977–1984 | England | 18 | - |

Balwant Singh Saini (born 22 September 1949) is a Kenyan born former British hockey international of Indian descent.

== Biography ==
Saini was born in Kisumu, Kenya and educated at Kisumu High School before studying at Newcastle University in England. He played club hockey for Slough Hockey Club in the Men's England Hockey League.

He made his debut for England on 12 March 1977 in the Rank Xerox hockey tournament, when he played against West Germany at Lords, London. He scored a spectacular goal on his debut at Lords which is still remembered.

He went on to win 18 England caps and played in the 4th World Cup in Buenos Aires in 1978.

Bal also won his first England Indoor cap on 10 January 1981 against Scotland in Cardiff. He went on to win 18 England caps and another 18 indoor caps, scoring 11 goals.

On the domestic circuit, he was also a member of Slough's successful teams in the late 70s and early 80s.
