= Sutinder Khehar =

British field hockey player

Suti Khehar
Personal information
- Full name: Sutinder Singh Khehar
- Born: 4 June 1953 (age 73) Nairobi, British Kenya

Sport
- Sport: Field hockey
- Position: Centre half
Senior career
Years	Team	Caps	Goals
1971–1990	Slough	-	-
1990–1992	Indian Gymkhana	-	-
1994–1995	Maidenhead	-	-
National team
Years	Team	Caps	Goals
1974–1982	England	60	-
1979–1980	Great Britain	12	-

Sutinder "Suti" Singh Khehar (born 4 June 1953) is a Kenyan-born former British hockey international player.

== Biography ==
Khehar was born in Nairobi, Kenya after his parents moved from Punjab in India in 1947 because his father joined the Kenyan Police Force. He played hockey for Sikh Union in Nairobi and represented Kenya Juniors against Uganda on 2 August 1970 before emigrating to England in February 1971, where he studied at Slough College.

He played club hockey for Slough Hockey Club in the Men's England Hockey League from the 1971/72 season and made his debut for England on 23 March 1974 against West Germany at Lords, London.

With Slough, he won the league title during the 1975–76 season, the European Club Championship in 1980, four consecutive league titles from 1980 to 1983 and was club captain from 1985 to 1988.

He played in the 4th World Cup in Buenos Aires in 1978 and made his Great Britain debut on 10 January 1980 against India in Karachi but missed out on an Olympic appearance in 1980 because of the British boycott of the Games. He played in his second World Cup at the 1982 Men's Hockey World Cup in Bombay and acted as captain in the last pool game.

Khehar also won his first England indoor cap on 29 February 1980 against Switzerland in Zurich. He went on to win 60 England caps, 12 Great Britain caps and another 12 indoor caps.

After leaving Slough he joined the Indian Gymkhana Hockey Club and Maidenhead Hockey Club.
