= Ian Taylor (field hockey) =

British field hockey player (born 1954)

Personal information
- Born: 24 September 1954 (age 71) Bromsgrove, England
- Height: 185 cm (6 ft 1 in)
- Weight: 78 kg (172 lb)

Sport
- Sport: Field hockey
- Position: Goalkeeper
Senior career
Years	Team	Caps	Goals
1977–1982	Slough	-	-
1982–1988	East Grinstead	-	-
National team
Years	Team	Caps	Goals
–	Great Britain		-
–	England		-
Medal record
Field hockey
Representing Great Britain
Olympic Games
Gold medal – first place	1988 Seoul	Team
Bronze medal – third place	1984 Los Angeles	Team
Champions Trophy
Bronze medal – third place	1978 Lahore	Team
Bronze medal – third place	1984 Karachi	Team
Silver medal – second place	1985 Perth	Team
Representing England
World Cup
Silver medal – second place	1986 London	Team
European Championship
Silver medal – second place	1987 Moscow	Team

Ian Charles Boucher Taylor (born 24 September 1954) is a former field hockey goalkeeper who won a gold medal at the 1988 Summer Olympics. Taylor carried the flag at the opening ceremony of the 1988 Olympic Games and served in a director capacity at multiple companies since retiring from playing.

== Biography ==
Taylor was born in Bromsgrove, England, and was a student at Borough Road College, Isleworth, London. He has played club hockey for Slough Hockey Club in the London League but represented Worcestershire at county level. He made his England debut in 1977 at the Nehru tournament in front of 47,000 in Jabalpur, India.

Taylor cemented the goalkeeping position for England and played at the 1978 Men's Hockey World Cup and was part of the bronze medal winning Great Britain team that competed at the inaugural 1978 Men's Hockey Champions Trophy, in Lahore, Pakistan.

He was selected for the Great Britain team for the 1980 Olympic Games in Moscow, but subsequently did not attend due to the boycott.

After the 1982 Men's Hockey World Cup, he switched clubs for the 1982/83 season, opting to join East Grinstead Hockey Club. While at East Grinstead, Taylor was considered the world's leading goalkeeper and helped Great Britain win a bronze in the hockey tournament at the 1984 Olympic Games in Los Angeles. He was part of the bronze medal winning Great Britain team that competed at the 1984 Men's Hockey Champions Trophy, in Karachi, Pakistan and the silver medal winning team the following year at the 1985 Men's Hockey Champions Trophy in Perth, Australia.

In February 1985, Taylor was selected for the England men's training squad at Bisham Abbey that remarkably contained three goalkeepers with the surname Taylor. The others being Nick Taylor and Steve Taylor.

Taylor also won silver with the England squad at the 1986 Hockey World Cup and in the European Cup with the England squad he won silver in 1987 and bronze in 1978.

Taylor was a member of the gold winning Great Britain squad in the 1988 Summer Olympics in Seoul, during which he was a teacher at Bromsgrove School and had the honour to carry the flag at the opening ceremony.

Taylor has held a number of honorary roles within sports administration including Minister's nominee on the Sports Council (with a UK remit), director of the GB ice hockey Board and a director of the British Olympic Association. He was also a commentator for BBC Sport between 1988 and 1996. He was previously the chief executive for sportscotland, following the departure of Ian Robson in July 2004. He was also the short lived CEO of the Greyhound Board of Great Britain but resigned over a policy introduced under his tenure that saw the pooling of samples.
