= Isca Hockey Club =

English field hockey team

- League: Men's England Hockey League; Women's England Hockey League
- Founded: 1913; 112 years ago
- Home ground: University of Exeter Sports Park

Isca Hockey Club is a field hockey club that plays in Exeter. The club plays fixtures at several locations, primarily on the water-based pitch at the University of Exeter and Exeter School. The name of the club, Isca, originates from Isca Dumnoniorum, the Roman name for the Exeter area. The club has secured several major national honours since it was created in 1913, and recently celebrated its 100-year anniversary in 2013.

== Teams ==
The club has six men's and five women's teams, junior teams at all age groups, and also mixed and veteran's teams. The men's 1st XI play in the England Hockey Men's League Conference West and the women's 1st XI play in the England Hockey Investec Women's Hockey League Division One South

== History ==
During the 1978–79 season, Isca were surprise winners of the Men's National Inter League Championship, which was the tournament held to determine the champions of England. They defeated Southgate on the way to reaching the final where they beat Westcliff. They had qualified for the tournament by virtue of winning the Debenhams' sponsored West League.

In 2019, the women's section of the club joined the University of Exeter Hockey Club and now play as the Isca and University of Exeter Hockey Club.

== Major national honours ==
- 1978–79 - Men's National League champions
- 1985-86 - Men's National League runners Up
