= Trojans Hockey Club =

Women's England Hockey League field hockey club

- Full name: Trojans Hockey Club
- League: Women's England Hockey League; Men's South Premier Hockey League
- Founded: 1900s+ + as Southampton HC
- Home ground: Stoneham Lane, Southampton SO50 9HT

Trojans Hockey Club is a field hockey club that plays at Stoneham Lane in Southampton.

The club runs six men's, five women's and junior teams. The men's first XI play in the South Premier Division 2 (4th tier of English hockey) and the women's first XI play in the England Hockey League Investec Conference West (2nd tier of English hockey).

== Major national honours ==
Trojans hockey club has reached two major national finals during its history.

- 1977-78 Men's National League Runner Up
- 1994-95 Women's National Cup Runner-Up

== Notable players ==
=== Men's internationals ===
Extended content

Player	Events/Notes	Ref
(England) Brian Purdy	WC (1975)	
(South Africa) Ignatius Malgraff		

Key

- Oly = Olympic Games
- CG = Commonwealth Games
- WC = World Cup
- CT = Champions Trophy
- EC = European Championships

=== Women's internationals ===
Extended content

Player	Events/Notes	Ref
(England) Alex Danson		
(England) Sally Gibson		
(England) Sophie Bray		
(England) Takara Haines		
(India) Dipika Murthy		
(England) Stephanie Farmer		

Key

- Oly = Olympic Games
- CG = Commonwealth Games
- WC = World Cup
- CT = Champions Trophy
- EC = European Championships
