= Slough Hockey Club =

British

- Full name: Slough Hockey Club
- Founded: 1921
- Home ground: Upton Park, Upton Road, Slough, Berkshire

Slough Hockey Club is a professional field hockey club established in 1921 and now based at Upton Park, Upton Road in Slough, Berkshire, England.

The ladies 1st XI play in the Women's England Hockey League. The club fields men's, ladies and age group youth sides.

The club is historically the most successful in England with six Men's Championships, eleven Women's Championships, four Men's National Cup wins and six Women's National Cup wins.

== Major National Honours ==
National League

- 1975–76 Men's League Champions
- 1979–80 Men's League Champions
- 1980–81 Men's League Champions
- 1981–82 Men's League Champions
- 1982–83 Men's League Champions
- 1986–87 Men's League Champions
- 1989–90 Women's League Champions
- 1990-91 Women's League Champions
- 1991-92 Women's League Champions
- 1994-95 Women's League Champions
- 1996-97 Women's League Champions
- 1997-98 Women's League Champions
- 1998-99 Women's League Champions
- 2001-02 Women's League Champions
- 2002-03 Women's League Champions
- 2007-08 Women's League Champions
- 2009-10 Women's League Champions

National Cup

- 1976-77 Men's National Cup Winners
- 1978–79 Men's National Cup Winners
- 1979–80 Men's National Cup Winners
- 1980-81 Men's National Cup Winners
- 1981-82 Women's National Cup Winners
- 1982–83 Women's National Cup Winners
- 1985–86 Women's National Cup Winners
- 1993-94 Women's National Cup Winners
- 1998-99 Women's National Cup Winners
- 2000-01 Women's National Cup Winners

National Tournaments

- 1998-99 Women's Premiership Tournament Winners
- 2000-01 Women's Premiership Tournament Winners
- 2002-03 Women's Premiership Tournament Winners

== Notable players ==
=== Men's internationals ===
Extended content

Player	Events	Notes/Ref
(England) Paul Barber	Oly (1984, 1988), WC (1982, 1986), CT (1980, 1985, 1986, 1987)	
(England) Roly Brookeman	WC (1975)	
(England) Sutinder Khehar	WC (1978, 1982), CT (1980, 1981)	
(England) Simon Nicklin	Oly (1992), CT (1991, 1992)	
(England) Mike Parris	WC (1973)	
(England) Balwant Singh Saini	WC (1978)	
(England) Ian Taylor	WC (1978, 1982), CT (1978, 1980, 1981)	

Key

- Oly = Olympic Games
- CG = Commonwealth Games
- WC = World Cup
- CT = Champions Trophy
- EC = European Championships

=== Women's internationals ===
Extended content

Player	Events	Notes/Ref
(England) Ashleigh Ball		
(England) Karen Brown		
(England) Alex Danson		
(England) Fiona Greenham		
(England) Shona McCallin		
(England) Mandy Nicholls		
(England) Kate Richardson-Walsh		
(England) Jane Smith		
(England) Nicola White		

Key

- Oly = Olympic Games
- CG = Commonwealth Games
- WC = World Cup
- CT = Champions Trophy
- EC = European Championships
