= Sutton Coldfield Hockey Club =

West Midlands field hockey club

- Full name: Sutton Coldfield Hockey Club
- Founded: 1891
- Home ground: Sutton Coldfield Hockey & Cricket Club, Rectory Road

Sutton Coldfield Hockey Club is a field hockey club based at Rectory Park in Sutton Coldfield, West Midlands.

== Teams ==
The club runs eight men's, seven women's teams in addition to mixed, veterans and junior teams. The women's first XI play in the Investec Women's Hockey League Conference North and the men's first XI play in the Midlands 1 Division.

== History ==
In November 1961 the club began celebration for their 70th anniversary by playing a match against the Warwickshire President's XI.

The women's team has gained significant honours -

== Major honours ==
=== National honours ===
- 1980-81 Cup Champions
- 1988-89 Cup Runner-Up
- 1989-90 Cup Champions
- 1990-91 Cup Champions
- 1999-2000 Cup Runner-Up

=== European honours ===
- 1992 European Cup Winners Cup winners

== Notable players ==
=== Men's internationals ===
Extended content

Player	Events|Notes	Ref
(England) John Bell	Oly (1960)	
(England) Eric Crockford	Oly (1920)	

Key

- Oly = Olympic Games
- CG = Commonwealth Games
- WC = World Cup
- CT = Champions Trophy
- EC = European Championships

=== Women's internationals ===
Extended content

Player	Events|Notes	Ref
(England) Laura Unsworth		

Key

- Oly = Olympic Games
- CG = Commonwealth Games
- WC = World Cup
- CT = Champions Trophy
- EC = European Championships
