= Ipswich Hockey Club =

Former English field hockey team

- Full name: Ipswich Hockey Club
- Founded: 1899
- Home ground: Tuddenham Road

Ipswich Hockey Club is a field hockey club founded in 1899 and based at the Ipswich Sports Club in Henley Road, Ipswich, Suffolk with matchday fixtures held at Tuddenham Road. The women's team have been champions of England on one occasion (1992–93).

== Teams ==
The club runs 6 women's teams, 6 men's teams and a number of junior teams. The women's first X1 play in the East Women's League and the men's first X1 play in the East Men's League

== Honours ==
The women's team has gained significant honours -

- 1992-93 National League Champions
- Seven times National League Runner-up
- 1984-85 Cup Champions
- 1995-96 Cup Champions
- 2001-02 Cup Champions

== Notable players ==
=== Women's internationals ===
- (England) Hannah Martin
