= 1994–95 England Hockey League season =

1994-95 EHL Hockey season

1994–95 England Hockey League

The 1994–95 English Hockey League season took place from October 1994 until April 1995.

The Men's National League won by Teddington and the Women's National League was won by Slough.

The Men's Hockey Association Cup was won by Guildford and the AEWHA Cup was won by Hightown.

== Men's National League First Division League Standings ==
Pos	Team	P	W	D	L	F	A	GD	Pts
1	Teddington	17	13	1	3	50	25	25	40
2	Reading	17	13	1	3	45	22	23	40
3	Cannock	17	11	5	1	57	19	38	38
4	Guildford	17	11	1	5	54	30	29	34
5	Southgate	17	9	5	3	45	25	20	32
6	Hounslow	17	9	4	4	33	21	12	31
7	Old Loughtonians	17	8	2	7	45	34	11	26
8	Surbiton	17	7	5	5	30	22	8	26
9	East Grinstead	17	8	2	7	32	27	5	26
10	Havant	17	6	5	6	34	32	2	23
11	Bournville	17	5	4	8	33	42	-9	19
12	Canterbury	17	4	6	7	29	33	-4	18
13	Trojans	17	5	3	9	27	42	-15	18
14	Indian Gymkhana	17	5	2	10	23	39	-16	17
15	Stourport	17	3	6	8	25	37	-12	15
16	Hull	17	4	1	12	20	59	-39	13
17	Firebrands	17	2	2	13	15	44	-29	8
18	Slough	17	1	3	13	17	61	-44	5

= Champions
= Relegated

== Women's National League Premier Division League Standings ==
Pos	Team	P	W	D	L	F	A	Pts
1	Slough	14	12	1	1	41	9	37
2	Hightown	14	8	4	2	32	10	28
3	Ipswich	14	9	1	4	22	15	28
4	Sutton Coldfield	14	5	4	5	19	18	19
5	Leicester	14	4	5	5	14	16	17
6	Clifton	14	4	2	8	14	24	14
7	Bracknell	14	2	3	9	8	29	9
8	Chelmsford	14	1	2	11	11	40	5

= Champions
= Relegated

== Men's Cup (Hockey Association Cup) ==
=== Quarter-finals ===
Team 1	Team 2	Score
Guildford	Barford Tigers	4-1
Isca	Cannock	2-1
Teddington	Southgate	1-0
Formby	Richmond	1-0

=== Semi-finals ===
Team 1	Team 2	Score
Guildford	Isca	5-1
Formby	Teddington	1-4

=== Final ===
(Held at Canterbury on 28 May)

Team 1	Team 2	Score
Guildford	Teddington	4-1

Guildford
Kevin Priday, Stuart Matton, Tony Robertson, Julian Barker, Ian Jennings, Hamish Ferguson, Graham Cartmell, Mark Morris, Danny Hall, Rob Bilsland, Richard Markham Subs Neil Powell, C Burnell
Teddington
Garry Meredith, Paul Way, Phil McGuire, Simon Nicklin, Tony Colclough, Renwick Irvine, Jimmy Wallis, Tyrone Moore, Peter Gibbins, Jason Laslett, Andy Billson subs Neil D'Mello, Mark Sully

== Women's Cup (AEWHA Cup) ==
=== Quarter-finals ===
Team 1	Team 2	Score
Exmouth	Ealing	4–0
Leicester	Winchester	7-0
Hightown	Chelmsford	2-0
Trojans	Harleston Magpies	2-0

=== Semi-finals ===
Team 1	Team 2	Score
Trojans	Leicester	1-1 (4-3 p)
Exmouth	Hightown	1-3

=== Final ===
(Held at Milton Keynes Sports Club on 21 May)

Team 1	Team 2	Score
Hightown	Trojans	5-0

Hightown
Carolyn Reid, Jackie Crook, Julie Aspin, Chris Cook, Lorraine Marsden (capt), Fiona Lee, Maggie Souyave, Linda Carr, Michaela Morton, Lucy Newcombe, Tina Cullen subs Caroline Gilbert, T Mawdsley, Donna Mills
Trojans
Julie Williams, K Smith, Lisa Copeland, S Hibberd, E Teague, J Moss, Sally Gibson, A Wakefield, M Sutter, Kathryn James, C Manchester Subs S Strange, J Greenham
