= 1993–94 England Hockey League season =

English field hockey season

1993–94 England Hockey League

The 1993–94 English Hockey League season took place from October 1993 until April 1994.

The Men's National League was sponsored by PizzaExpress and won by Havant. The Women's National League was won by Leicester.

The Men's Hockey Association Cup was won by Teddington and the AEWHA Cup was won by Slough.

== Men's Pizza Express National League First Division League Standings ==
Pos	Team	P	W	D	L	F	A	GD	Pts
1	Havant	17	14	2	1	39	13	26	44
2	Hounslow	17	12	3	2	48	14	34	39
3	Old Loughtonians	17	10	6	1	48	19	29	36
4	Southgate	17	10	4	3	45	15	30	34
5	Teddington	17	10	3	4	36	23	13	33
6	Cannock	17	7	7	3	31	21	10	28
7	Stourport	17	8	4	5	26	16	10	28
8	East Grinstead	17	8	4	5	32	23	9	28
9	Reading	17	8	2	7	30	27	3	26
10	Trojans	17	6	2	9	25	32	-7	20
11	Indian Gymkhana	17	4	6	7	18	29	-11	18
12	Welton	17	5	2	10	18	35	-17	17
13	Bournville	17	5	1	11	23	34	-11	16
14	Firebrands	17	3	7	7	15	30	-15	16
15	Canterbury	17	3	5	9	20	39	-19	14
16	Slough	17	4	2	11	17	37	-20	14
17	St Albans	17	4	1	12	15	42	-27	13
18	Bromley	17	1	1	15	18	45	-27	4

= Champions
= Relegated

== Women's National League Premier Division League Standings ==
Pos	Team	P	W	D	L	F	A	Pts
1	Leicester	14	9	3	2	23	11	30
2	Ipswich	14	8	4	2	24	8	28
3	Sutton Coldfield	14	8	3	3	19	14	27
4	Slough	14	7	4	3	19	8	25
5	Hightown	14	8	1	5	20	12	25
6	Clifton	14	2	3	9	10	25	9
7	Chelmsford	14	2	1	11	9	31	7
8	Ealing	14	1	3	10	11	26	6

= Champions
= Relegated

== Men's Cup (Hockey Association Cup) ==
=== Quarter-finals ===
Team 1	Team 2	Score
Old Loughtonians	Havant	3-0
Reading	Harrogate	7-0
Teddington	Beeston	2-1
Hounslow	Southgate	2-2 (6-5 p)

=== Semi-finals ===
Team 1	Team 2	Score
Old Loughtonians	Reading	3-2
Hounslow	Teddington	2-2 (2-4 p)

=== Final ===
(Held at University of Birmingham on 15 May)

Team 1	Team 2	Score
Teddington	Old Loughtonians	1-0

Teddington
Garry Meredith, Phil McGuire, Simon Nicklin, Jimmy Wallis, Tony Colclough, Clive Camburn, Jon Hauck, Tyrone Moore, Peter Gibbins, Jason Laslett (capt), Andy Billson, Russell Benzies

Old Loughtonians
Alasdair Seaton (capt), Gerald Crymble, Julian Halls, Ian Morrison, D Allen, Colin Hector, Neil Barker, Chris Gladman, Nick Thompson, Paul Krishman, Alan Philpot

== Women's Cup (AEWHA Cup) ==
=== Quarter-finals ===
Team 1	Team 2	Score
Exmouth	Ealing	3-2
Chelmsford	Doncaster	1-2
Hightown	Loughborough Students	1-0
Slough	Sutton Coldfield	1-0

=== Semi-finals ===
Team 1	Team 2	Score
Slough	Exmouth	5-0
Hightown	Doncaster	2-0

=== Final ===
(Held at Milton Keynes on 14 May)

Team 1	Team 2	Score
Slough	Hightown	1-1 (4-2 p)

Slough
Sue Knight, Ali Burd, Mandy Pottow, Sue Chandler, Michelle Hall, Sam Wright, Anna Bennett, Karen Brown (capt), Lesley Hobley, Julie Robertson, Kate White sub Helen Thornalley
Hightown
Carolyn Reid, Fiona Lee, Maggie Souyave, Julie Aspin, Linda Carr, Michaela Morton, Jackie Crook, Lorraine Marsden (capt), Chris Cook, Tina Cullen, Donna Mills subs Lucy Newcombe, N Jones
