= 1996–97 England Hockey League season =

English field hockey season

1996–97 England Hockey League

The 1996–97 English Hockey League season took place from October 1996 until April 1997.

The Men's National League was won by Reading with the Women's National League going to Slough.

The Men's Hockey Association Cup was won by Teddington and the AEWHA Cup was won by Ipswich.

== Men's National League Premier Division League Standings ==
Pos	Team	P	W	D	L	F	A	GD	Pts
1	Reading	22	15	2	5	79	53	26	47
2	Teddington	22	15	1	6	78	56	32	46
3	Southgate	22	13	2	7	68	55	13	41
4	Cannock	22	12	3	7	79	52	27	39
5	Canterbury	22	10	5	7	65	59	6	35
6	East Grinstead	22	9	7	6	65	52	13	34
7	Guildford	22	10	3	9	76	64	12	33
8	Old Loughtonians	22	10	2	10	59	56	-3	32
9	Hounslow	22	5	6	11	43	65	-22	21
10	Barford Tigers	22	6	2	14	36	70	-34	20
11	Surbiton	22	4	7	11	44	73	-29	19
12	Havant	22	2	2	18	36	73	-37	8

= Champions
= Relegated

== Women's National League Premier Division League Standings ==
Pos	Team	P	W	D	L	F	A	Pts
1	Slough	14	11	1	2	41	15	34
2	Ipswich	14	9	3	2	36	17	30
3	Clifton	14	7	4	3	33	20	25
4	Sutton Coldfield	14	4	5	5	26	32	17
5	Doncaster	14	3	4	7	21	28	13
6	Hightown	14	4	1	9	19	38	13
7	Trojans	14	3	3	8	18	29	12
8	Leicester	14	3	3	8	17	32	12

= Champions
= Relegated

== Men's Cup (Hockey Association Cup) ==
=== Quarter-finals ===
Team 1	Team 2	Score
St Albans	Chelmsford	2-1
Old Loughtonians	Reading	2-5
Cannock	Teddington	4-6 aet
Surbiton	Guildford	5-1

=== Semi-finals ===
Team 1	Team 2	Score
Reading	St Albans	10-1
Surbiton	Teddington	1-3

=== Final ===
(Held at the Stadium, Milton Keynes on 11 May)

Team 1	Team 2	Score
Teddington	Reading	2-1

Teddington
Jon Ebsworth, Tyrone Moore, Phil McGuire, S Dawkins, Tony Colclough, Jason Laslett, Jimmy Wallis, Simon Nicklin, Jon Hauck, Nick Conway, Andy Billson subs D Haydon, Paul Way, G Read
Reading
Wayne Box GK, John Slay, Jon Wyatt, Charlie Oscroft, Andy Holden, Mark Hoskin, G Edwards, K Sanders, Robert Todd, Mark Pearn, Scott Ashdown subs A Jones, Simon Briscoe, Jonathan Loose

== Women's Cup (AEWHA Cup) ==
=== Quarter-finals ===
Team 1	Team 2	Score
Doncaster	Sutton Coldfield	4-1
Clifton	Canterbury	3-1
Hightown	Aldridge	3-1
Ipswich	Slough	4-2

=== Semi-finals ===
Team 1	Team 2	Score
Clifton	Ipswich	4-2
Hightown	Doncaster	2-0

=== Final ===
(Held at Milton Keynes on 25 May)

Team 1	Team 2	Score
Hightown	Clifton	2-2 (3-2 p)

Hightown
Carolyn Reid; Linda Carr (capt), Michaela Morton, Caroline Gilbert, K Walsh; Julie Aspin, Fiona Lee, Michelle Liptrot, Lucy Newcombe, Tina Cullen, Yana Williams Sub Maggie Souyave
Clifton
Claire Burr; Sue Brimble, Rachel O'Bryan, Michelle Robertson, Louise Hipkins, Lorraine Marsden, Tammy Miller (capt), Elaine Basterfield, Lucy Culliford, Denise Marston-Smith, Juliet Rayden Subs J Martin, J Scullion
