= 2023 Men's FIH Hockey World Cup – European Qualifier =

2021 hockey event

2021 Men's European Qualifier
Tournament details
- Host country: Wales
- City: Cardiff
- Dates: 21–24 October
- Teams: 8 (from 1 confederation)
- Venue: Sport Wales National Centre

Final positions
- Champions: Wales
- Runner-up: France
- Third place: Austria

Tournament statistics
- Matches played: 12
- Goals scored: 52 (4.33 per match)
- Top scorer: (Scotland) Cameron Golden (4 goals)

The 2021 Men's European Qualifier was the European qualification tournament for the 2023 Men's FIH Hockey World Cup. The tournament was held at the Sport Wales National Centre in Cardiff, Wales from 21 to 24 October 2021.

The top five teams from the 2021 EuroHockey Championship were already qualified for the 2023 Men's FIH Hockey World Cup and the top two teams from this tournament joined them.

== Qualification ==
The bottom three teams from the 2021 EuroHockey Championship and the top 5 from the 2021 EuroHockey Championship II participated in the tournament.

Dates	Event	Location	Quotas	Qualifiers
4–12 June 2021	2021 EuroHockey Championship	Amstelveen, Netherlands	3	France; Russia; Wales
15–21 August 2021	2021 EuroHockey Championship II	Gniezno, Poland	5	Austria; Italy; Ireland; Poland; Scotland
Total			8	

== Results ==
All times are local (UTC+1).

=== Bracket ===
Quarter-finals
21 October
France	5
Poland	0
21 October
Austria (p.s.o.)	0 (3)
Scotland	0 (2)
21 October
Ireland	2
Russia	0
21 October
Wales	2
Italy	0

Semi-finals
23 October
France	4
Austria	1
23 October
Ireland	1 (1)
Wales (p.s.o.)	1 (2)

Final
24 October
France	1
Wales	2
Third place
24 October
Austria (p.s.o.)	3 (4)
Ireland	3 (3)

=== Quarter-finals ===
21 October 2021
11:00

France	5–0	Poland
Clément 14', 15'; Rogeau 18'; Baumgarten 33'; Branicki 57'	Report

Umpires:
Shane O'Donnell (IRL)
Kevin Roberts (WAL)

21 October 2021
13:30

Austria	0–0	Scotland
	Report
Penalties
Unterkircher (penalty shoot-out scored); Fröhlich (penalty shoot-out scored); Losonci (penalty shoot-out missed); Hasun (penalty shoot-out missed); Körper (penalty shoot-out scored)	3–2	(penalty shoot-out missed) Forsyth; (penalty shoot-out missed) McConnell; (penalty shoot-out scored) Golden; (penalty shoot-out scored) Morton; (penalty shoot-out missed) Field

Umpires:
Antonio Ilgrande (ITA)
Jakub Mejzlík (CZE)

21 October 2021
16:00

Ireland	2–0	Russia
Walker 4', 34'	Report

Umpires:
Ian Diamond (SCO)
Paul van den Assum (NED)

21 October 2021
18:30

Wales	2–0	Italy
G. Furlong 26', 55'	Report

Umpires:
Nick Bennett (ENG)
Ben Göntgen (GER)

=== Fifth to eighth place classification ===
5–8th place semifinals
22 October
Poland	2
Scotland	10
22 October
Russia	4
Italy	3

Fifth place
24 October
Scotland	4
Russia	2
Seventh place
24 October
Poland (p.s.o.)	1 (3)
Italy	1 (2)

==== 5–8th place semifinals ====
22 October 2021
16:00

Poland	2–10	Scotland
Kurowski 2'; Gumny 60'	Report	Walker 9', 58'; Forsyth 12', 17'; Coultas 38'; Riddell 42'; Bull 48'; Golden 52', 55'; McConnell 54'

Umpires:
Antonio Ilgrande (ITA)
Shane O'Donnell (IRL)

22 October 2021
18:30

Russia	4–3	Italy
Zheleznyakov 26'; Matkovskiy 36'; Skiperskiy 39'; Golubev 60'	Report	Sior 16'; Núñez 20'; Amorosini 52'

Umpires:
Ian Diamond (SCO)
Kevin Roberts (WAL)

==== Seventh and eighth place ====
24 October 2021
09:30

Poland	1–1	Italy
Hillyer 48'	Report	Núñez 28'
Penalties
Kurowski (penalty shoot-out scored); Jarzyński (penalty shoot-out missed); Pawlak (penalty shoot-out missed); Rutkowski (penalty shoot-out scored); Gumny (penalty shoot-out scored)	3–2	(penalty shoot-out scored) Garbaccio; (penalty shoot-out scored) Amorosini; (penalty shoot-out missed) Keenan; (penalty shoot-out missed) Sior; (penalty shoot-out missed) Núñez

Umpires:
Nick Bennett (ENG)
Paul van den Assum (NED)

==== Fifth and sixth place ====
24 October 2021
12:00

Scotland	4–2	Russia
Golden 24', 48'; Morton 51'; Greaves 52'	Report	Loginov 50'; Yankun 54'

Umpires:
Jakub Mejzlík (CZE)
Kevin Roberts (WAL)

=== First to fourth place classification ===
==== Semi-finals ====
23 October 2021
12:00

France	4–1	Austria
Charlet 19'; Goyet 48'; Tynevez 55'; Branicki 60'	Report	Unterkircher 39'

Umpires:
Ben Göntgen (GER)
Paul van den Assum (NED)

23 October 2021
14:30

Ireland	1–1	Wales
Robson 1'	Report	Naughalty 19'
Penalties
Empey (penalty shoot-out missed); Walsh (penalty shoot-out missed); McKee (penalty shoot-out missed); Murray (penalty shoot-out scored); Cole (penalty shoot-out missed)	1–2	(penalty shoot-out missed) Prosser; (penalty shoot-out scored) Shipperley; (penalty shoot-out missed) Naughalty; (penalty shoot-out scored) Pritchard

Umpires:
Nick Bennett (ENG)
Jakub Mejzlík (CZE)

==== Third and fourth place ====
24 October 2021
14:30

Austria	3–3	Ireland
Wellan 11'; Unterkircher 29'; Binder 58'	Report	McKee 33', 44'; Duncan 54'
Penalties
Unterkircher (penalty shoot-out scored); Fröhlich (penalty shoot-out scored); Losonci (penalty shoot-out scored); Hasun (penalty shoot-out missed); Körper (penalty shoot-out scored)	4–3	(penalty shoot-out missed) Empey; (penalty shoot-out scored) Walsh; (penalty shoot-out scored) Murray; (penalty shoot-out missed) Walker; (penalty shoot-out scored) O'Donoghue

Umpires:
Ian Diamond (SCO)
Ben Göntgen (GER)

==== Final ====
24 October 2021
17:00

France	1–2	Wales
Baumgarten 23'	Report	Hawker 43'; Shipperley 55'

Umpires:
Antonio Ilgrande (ITA)
Shane O'Donnell (IRL)

== Statistics ==
=== Final standings ===
Rank	Team
1	Wales
2	France
3	Austria
4	Ireland
5	Scotland
6	Russia
7	Poland
8	Italy

Qualified for the 2023 Men's FIH Hockey World Cup

=== Goalscorers ===
There were 52 goals scored in 12 matches, for an average of 4.33 goals per match.

4 goals

- (Scotland) Cameron Golden

2 goals

- (Austria) Fabian Unterkircher
- (France) Gaspard Baumgarten
- (France) Maximilien Branicki
- (France) Timothée Clément
- (Ireland) John McKee
- (Ireland) Benjamin Walker
- (Italy) Agustín Núñez
- (Scotland) Alan Forsyth
- (Scotland) Struan Walker
- (Wales) Gareth Furlong

1 goal

- (Austria) Oliver Binder
- (Austria) Nikolas Wellan
- (France) Victor Charlet
- (France) François Goyet
- (France) Blaise Rogeau
- (France) Etienne Tynevez
- (Ireland) Michael Robson
- (Ireland) Jeremy Duncan
- (Italy) Mattia Amorosini
- (Italy) Francois Sior
- (Poland) Mikołaj Gumny
- (Poland) Joseph Hillyer
- (Poland) Jacek Kurowski
- (Russia) Pavel Golubev
- (Russia) Iaroslav Loginov
- (Russia) Semen Matkovskiy
- (Russia) Alexander Skiperskiy
- (Russia) Nikolay Yankun
- (Russia) Dmitry Zheleznyakov
- (Scotland) Andy Bull
- (Scotland) Dan Coultas
- (Scotland) Edward Greaves
- (Scotland) Andrew McConnell
- (Scotland) Lee Morton
- (Scotland) Duncan Riddell
- (Wales) Luke Hawker
- (Wales) Joseph Naughalty
- (Wales) Rupert Shipperley

Source: FIH

== See also ==
- 2022 Women's FIH Hockey World Cup – European Qualifier
