= 2015–16 England Hockey League season =

English field hockey season

2015–16 England Hockey League

The 2015–2016 English Hockey League season took place from September 2015 until April 2016. The regular season consisted of two periods September until December and then February until March. The end of season playoffs known as the League Finals Weekend was held on the 16 & 17 of April.

Wimbledon won the Men's Premier League title despite finishing fourth in the regular season league standings. Surbiton won the Women's Premier League as well as finishing top of the regular season league standings.

The Men's Cup was won by Beeston and the Women's Cup was won by Clifton.

== Men's Premier Division League Standings ==
Pos	Team	P	W	D	L	F	A	GD	Pts
1	Holcombe	18	13	5	0	57	24	33	44
2	Surbiton	18	12	1	5	67	46	21	37
3	Reading	18	10	2	6	51	41	11	32
4	Wimbledon	18	10	2	6	41	35	6	32
5	Brooklands Manchester University	18	7	4	7	49	46	3	25
6	Beeston	18	5	4	9	38	40	-2	19
7	Hampstead and Westminster	18	5	4	9	26	36	-10	19
8	East Grinstead	18	5	3	10	36	50	-14	18
9	Canterbury	18	5	1	12	32	58	-26	16
10	Cannock	18	4	2	12	45	66	-21	14

= Qualified for League finals weekend
= Relegated

=== Results ===
Home \ Away	Bee	Bro	Can	Can	EG	HW	Hol	Rea	Sub	Wim
Beeston	—	2–2	6–2	3–1	2–2	3–2	1–1	2–3	2–3	1–0
Brooklands MU	2–2	—	3–3	5–0	3–1	3–2	2–5	3–1	4–6	2–2
Cannock	2–1	6–4	—	2–4	4–3	1–2	2–3	2–6	3–6	2–4
Canterbury	4–3	3–2	1–3	—	2–2	1–2	0–3	2–4	4–2	0–4
East Grinstead	0–3	1–2	5–2	4–3	—	4–1	2–3	4–3	1–5	1–2
Hampstead and Westminster	2–1	3–1	2–2	1–3	0–0	—	0–3	3–1	1–4	2–2
Holcombe	4–1	3–1	4–1	7–2	3–0	1–1	—	3–3	3–1	3–1
Reading	3–2	3–1	3–2	4–0	2–4	1–0	2–2	—	1–2	5–3
Surbiton	4–3	3–5	5–3	6–2	7–0	4–2	1–1	5–4	—	2–3
Wimbledon	3–0	0–4	4–3	1–0	3–2	1–0	3–5	1–2	4–1	—

Legend: Blue = home team win; Yellow = draw; Red = away team win.

== Women's Investec Premier Division League Standings ==
Pos	Team	P	W	D	L	F	A	Pts
1	Surbiton	18	14	4	0	53	11	46
2	Canterbury	18	12	4	2	45	18	40
3	University of Birmingham	18	11	3	4	37	20	36
4	Holcombe	18	9	3	6	28	31	30
5	East Grinstead	18	7	4	7	36	30	25
6	Leicester	18	7	1	10	24	36	22
7	Clifton	18	5	3	10	30	46	18
8	Reading	18	4	2	12	24	44	13
9	Bowdon Hightown	18	4	1	13	21	44	13
10	Buckingham	18	3	3	12	19	37	12

= Qualified for League finals weekend
= Relegated

=== Results ===
Home \ Away	Bow	Buc	Can	Cli	EG	Hol	Lei	Rea	Sub	Bir
Bowdon Hightown	—	1–2	0–1	2–3	0–5	1–2	2–0	0–3	1–1	0–2
Buckingham	0–1	—	2–3	0–0	1–3	1–3	3–3	1–1	1–3	0–1
Canterbury	7–1	3–1	—	2–0	2–3	1–1	2–1	5–0	1–1	2–1
Clifton	2–1	2–1	0–4	—	3–0	2–3	2–6	1–3	1–4	2–4
East Grinstead	2–1	1–2	0–1	2–2	—	4–1	4–0	3–2	0–2	1–3
Holcombe	2–1	3–2	0–0	2–2	2–1	—	1–3	3–0	0–5	3–1
Leicester	0–2	2–0	0–4	4–3	2–1	1–0	—	1–0	0–2	0–1
Reading	3–5	1–2	2–3	1–2	3–3	0–1	4–1	—	0–1	0–5
Surbiton	4–1	5–0	4–3	3–1	1–1	4–0	2–0	7–0	—	1–1
University of Birmingham	5–1	1–0	1–1	4–2	2–2	2–1	3–0	0–1	0–3	—

Legend: Blue = home team win; Yellow = draw; Red = away team win.

== League Finals Weekend ==
Semi-finals

Division	Team 1	Team 2	Score
Men's Premier	Surbiton	Reading	2-4
Men's Premier	Holcombe	Wimbledon	2-3
Women's Premier	Surbiton	Holcombe	2-0
Women's Premier	Canterbury	University of Birmingham	6-0

=== Finals ===
Men

Division	Team 1	Team 2	Score
Men's Premier	Wimbledon	Reading	1-1 (4-3 p)

Squads
Wimbledon
James Bailey (gk), Chris Rea (gk), James Jewell, Tom Woods, Henry Weir, Ian Sloan, James Osborn, Steve Ebbers, Alastair Brogdon (capt), Michael Hoare, Peter Millar, Phil Roper, Richie Dawson-Smith, Phil Ball, Caspar Phijffer, Chris Gregg, Pieter Wiegman, Johnny Kinder, Coach: Ben Hawes

Reading
Tommy Alexander (gk), Chris Wyver (gk), John Jackson, Richard Mantell, Simon Mantell, Dan Shingles, Peter Kelly, Jonty Clarke, Andy Watts, Tim Atkins, Tom Carson, Ben Boon, Jack Smart, Chris Newman (capt), Nick Park, Montgomery Jefferson, James O'Neill, Oliver Deasy, Coach: Andy Watts

Women

Division	Team 1	Team 2	Score
Women's Premier	Surbiton	Holcombe	0-0 (3-1 p)

== Men's Cup ==
=== Quarter-finals ===
Team 1	Team 2	Score
Chichester	Havant	3-1
Beeston	Sheffield University Bankers	2-1
City of Peterborough	Banbury	5-2
Surbiton	Univ of Birmingham	3-1

=== Semi-finals ===
Team 1	Team 2	Score
Beeston	City of Peterborough	5-1
Chichester	Surbiton	1-0

=== Final ===
(Held at the Lee Valley Hockey & Tennis Centre on 14 February)

Team 1	Team 2	Score
Beeston	Chichester	3-0

== Women's Cup ==
=== Quarter-finals ===
Team 1	Team 2	Score
Brooklands Poynton	Barnes	2-1
Holcombe	Bowdon Hightown	1-0
Buckingham	Ben Rhydding	3-2
Clifton	Univ of Birmingham	3-2

=== Semi-finals ===
Team 1	Team 2	Score
Buckingham	Brooklands Poynton	5-1
Clifton	Holcombe	3-1

=== Final ===
(Held at Lee Valley Hockey & Tennis Centre on 30 April)

Team 1	Team 2	Score
Clifton	Buckingham	1-0
