= 2015 Boys' EuroHockey Youth Championships =

Tournament details
- Host country: Spain
- City: Santander
- Dates: 19–25 July 2015
- Teams: 8
- Venue: Ruth Beitia Municipal Sports Complex

Final positions
- Champions: Germany (2nd title)
- Runner-up: Netherlands
- Third place: Spain

Tournament statistics
- Matches played: 20
- Goals scored: 122 (6.1 per match)
- Top scorer: (Germany) Timm Herzbruch (11 goals)
- Best player: (Germany) Jesper Kamlade

The 2015 Boys' EuroHockey Youth Championships was the 8th edition of the Boys' EuroHockey Youth Championship. The tournament was held from 19 to 25 July 2015 in Santander, Spain at the Ruth Beitia Municipal Sports Complex.

Germany won the tournament for the second time after defeating the Netherlands 7–1 in the final.

== Qualified teams ==
The following teams participated in the 2015 EuroHockey Youth Championship:

Dates	Event	Location	Quotas	Qualifier(s)
–	Host		1	Spain
22–28 July 2013	2013 EuroHockey Youth Championship	Vienna, Austria	5	Belgium; England; Germany; Netherlands; Scotland
–	2013 EuroHockey Youth Championship II	Gąsawa, Poland	2	Ireland; Russia
Total			8	

== Format ==
The eight teams were split into two groups of four teams. The top two teams advanced to the semifinals to determine the winner in a knockout system. The bottom two teams played in a new group with the teams they did not play against in the group stage. The last two teams were relegated to the EuroHockey Youth Championship II.

== Results ==
=== Preliminary round ===
==== Pool A ====
Pos	Team	Pld	W	D	L	GF	GA	GD	Pts	Qualification
1	Belgium	3	2	1	0	13	2	+11	7	Semi-finals
2	Spain	3	2	1	0	11	3	+8	7	Semi-finals
3	England	3	1	0	2	8	5	+3	3	
4	Russia	3	0	0	3	4	26	−22	0	

Source: EuroHockey
Rules for classification: 1) points; 2) goal difference; 3) goals scored; 4) head-to-head result.

19 July 2015
15:30

England	8–1	Russia
Gilmour 8', 59'; Waller 11', 62', 65'; Bowden 25'; Crowson 29'; Way 58'	Report	Arusiia 42'

Umpires:
Tim Meissner (GER)
Russell Donaldson (IRE)

19 July 2015
17:45

Spain	1–1	Belgium
Basterra 67'	Report	Stockbroekx 28'

Umpires:
Maarten Boxma (NED)
Alistair Munro (SCO)

21 July 2015
13:15

Belgium	9–1	Russia
De Sloover 6'; Verhoeven 10'; Raes 33'; Branicki 43'; Tombroff 45', 66'; Meurmans 53'; Sidler 56'; Stockbroekx 64'	Report	Arusiia 70+'

Umpires:
Tim Meissner (GER)
Maarten Boxma (NED)

21 July 2015
20:00

England	0–1	Spain
	Report	González 42'

Umpires:
Russell Donaldson (IRE)
Hristiyan Vasilev (BUL)

22 July 2015
17:00

Belgium	3–0	England
Raes 38'; Meurmans 49'; Branicki 56'	Report

Umpires:
Hristiyan Vasilev (BUL)
Tim Meissner (GER)

22 July 2015
20:00

Spain	9–2	Russia
Miralles 5'; Álvarez 24', 25'; Escudé 28', 62'; Cobos 37'; Gispert 64'; De Bruijn 65', 69'	Report	Gilev 3'; Arusiia 23'

Umpires:
Alistair Munro (SCO)
Russell Donaldson (IRE)

==== Pool B ====
Pos	Team	Pld	W	D	L	GF	GA	GD	Pts	Qualification
1	Germany	3	3	0	0	17	5	+12	9	Semi-finals
2	Netherlands	3	2	0	1	14	4	+10	6	Semi-finals
3	Ireland	3	1	0	2	7	12	−5	3	
4	Scotland	3	0	0	3	0	17	−17	0	

Source: EuroHockey
Rules for classification: 1) points; 2) goal difference; 3) goals scored; 4) head-to-head result.

19 July 2015
10:45

Netherlands	5–1	Ireland
Van Dam 9'; Kronenberg 11'; Stuve 13', 57'; De Geus 70'	Report	Dale 5'

Umpires:
Hristiyan Vasilev (BUL)
Daniel Rodríguez Fernández (ESP)

19 July 2015
10:45

Germany	7–0	Scotland
Herzbruch 17', 31', 41'; Kamlade 40'; Hellwig 47'; Blumensaat 47'; Rothländer 67'	Report

Umpires:
Nathan Steiner (BEL)
Vitaly Miklushevich (RUS)

20 July 2015
17:45

Scotland	0–3	Ireland
	Report	Morris 55'; Dale 63'; O'Hare 69'

Umpires:
Vitaly Miklushevich (RUS)
Daniel Rodríguez Fernández (ESP)

20 July 2015
20:00

Netherlands	2–3	Germany
Van Heijningen 1'; Papa 15'	Report	Herzbruch 4'; Prinz 10'; Rothländer 64'

Umpires:
Rob Argent (ENG)
Nathan Steiner (BEL)

22 July 2015
09:45

Germany	7–3	Ireland
Rothländer 11'; Herzbruch 20', 21', 40'; Terber 41'; Werner 44'; Hellwig 68'	Report	Cole 13'; Nolan 29'; Nelson 53'

Umpires:
Rob Argent (ENG)
Vitaly Miklushevich (RUS)

22 July 2015
12:00

Scotland	0–7	Netherlands
	Report	Brinkman 7'; Van Dam 11', 56'; Papa 25'; Stuve 31', 65'; Huijbregts 42'

Umpires:
Daniel Rodríguez Fernández (ESP)
Nathan Steiner (BEL)

=== Classification round ===
==== Fifth to eighth place classification ====
===== Pool C =====
Pos	Team	Pld	W	D	L	GF	GA	GD	Pts	Relegation
1	Ireland	3	3	0	0	14	2	+12	9	
2	England	3	1	1	1	13	7	+6	4	
3	Scotland	3	1	1	1	7	9	−2	4	Relegated to 2016 EuroHockey Youth Championship II
4	Russia	3	0	0	3	4	20	−16	0	Relegated to 2016 EuroHockey Youth Championship II

Source: EuroHockey
Rules for classification: 1) points; 2) goal difference; 3) goals scored; 4) head-to-head result.

24 July 2015
15:00

England	1–2	Ireland
Hibell 18'	Report	Nolan 4'; Nelson 43'

Umpires:
Alistair Munro (SCO)
Daniel Rodríguez Fernández (ESP)

24 July 2015
15:30

Russia	2–3	Scotland
Arusiia 64', 65'	Report	McQuade 18'; Harwood 50'; Christie 54'

Umpires:
Hristiyan Vasilev (BUL)
Russell Donaldson (IRE)

25 July 2015
11:30

Russia	1–9	Ireland
Gilev 35'	Report	Mullins 7', 32'; McClelland 17'; Dale 23', 48'; O'Hare 25'; De Boe-Agnew 28'; Robson 54'; Morris 61'

Umpires:
Nathan Steiner (BEL)
Daniel Rodríguez Fernández (ESP)

25 July 2015
12:00

England	4–4	Scotland
Hibell 14'; Crowson 34'; Gilmour 36'; Page 38'	Report	McConnell 4'; McFadden 65'; McCurry 68'; Webb 70+'

Umpires:
Maarten Boxma (NED)
Vitaly Miklushevich (RUS)

==== First to fourth place classification ====
Semi-finals
24 July 2015
Belgium	1 (3)
Netherlands (p.s.o)	1 (4)
24 July 2015
Germany	7
Spain	3

Final
25 July 2015
Netherlands	1
Germany	7
Third place
25 July 2015
Belgium	1 (1)
Spain (p.s.o)	1 (3)

===== Semi-finals =====
24 July 2015
17:30

Germany	7–3	Spain
Herzbruch 9', 25'; Kamlade 17'; Blumensaat 30', 46'; Bosserhoff 31'; Rothländer 39'	Report	Álvarez 18'; Cobos 48'; López Alonso 58'

Umpires:
Maarten Boxma (NED)
Nathan Steiner (BEL)

24 July 2015
20:00

Belgium	1–1	Netherlands
Verhoeven 62'	Report	Van Dam 61'
Penalties
Lootens (penalty shoot-out scored); Stockbroekx (penalty shoot-out missed); Raes (penalty shoot-out scored); De Sloover (penalty shoot-out scored); Verhoeven (penalty shoot-out missed)	3–4	(penalty shoot-out scored) Van Dam; (penalty shoot-out scored) Stuve; (penalty shoot-out missed) Schoenaker; (penalty shoot-out scored) Huijbregts; (penalty shoot-out scored) De Geus

Umpires:
Tim Meissner (GER)
Rob Argent (ENG)

===== Third and fourth place =====
25 July 2015
14:30

Belgium	1–1	Spain
Capelle 25'	Report	Cobos 35'
Penalties
Lootens (penalty shoot-out scored); Stockbroekx (penalty shoot-out missed); Branicki (penalty shoot-out missed); De Sloover (penalty shoot-out missed)	1–3	(penalty shoot-out missed) González Mesones; (penalty shoot-out scored) Cobos; (penalty shoot-out scored) Miralles; (penalty shoot-out scored) De Bruijn

Umpires:
Tim Meissner (GER)
Hristiyan Vasilev (BUL)

===== Final =====
25 July 2015
19:30

Netherlands	1–7	Germany
Stuve 48'	Report	Kamlade 17', 24'; Herzbruch 20', 70+'; Hellwig 27', 46'; Harms 45'

Umpires:
Rob Argent (ENG)
Alistair Munro (SCO)

== Awards ==
Player of the Tournament	Top Goalscorer	Goalkeeper of the Tournament	Fair Play
(Germany) Jesper Kamlade	(Germany) Timm Herzbruch	(England) Toby Reynolds-Cotterill	Spain

== Statistics ==
=== Final standings ===
As per statistical convention in field hockey, matches decided in extra time are counted as wins and losses, while matches decided by penalty shoot-outs are counted as draws.

Pos	Team	Pld	W	D	L	GF	GA	GD	Pts	Status
1st place, gold medalist(s)	Germany	5	5	0	0	31	9	+22	15	
2nd place, silver medalist(s)	Netherlands	5	2	1	2	16	12	+4	7	
3rd place, bronze medalist(s)	Spain	5	2	2	1	15	11	+4	8	
4	Belgium	5	2	3	0	15	4	+11	9	
5	Ireland	5	3	0	2	18	14	+4	9	
6	England	5	1	1	3	13	11	+2	4	
7	Scotland	5	1	1	3	7	23	−16	4	Relegated to 2016 EuroHockey Youth Championship II
8	Russia	5	0	0	5	7	38	−31	0	Relegated to 2016 EuroHockey Youth Championship II

Source: EuroHockey

=== Goalscorers ===
There were 122 goals scored in 20 matches, for an average of 6.1 goals per match.

11 goals

- (Germany) Timm Herzbruch

5 goals

- (Netherlands) Tijn Stuve
- (Russia) Georgii Arusiia

4 goals

- (Germany) Malte Hellwig
- (Germany) Jesper Kamlade
- (Germany) Moritz Rothländer
- (Ireland) Julian Dale
- (Netherlands) Thijs van Dam

3 goals

- (England) Euan Gilmour
- (England) Jack Waller
- (Germany) Carl Blumensaat
- (Spain) Alejandro Álvarez
- (Spain) Ignacio Cobos

2 goals

- (Belgium) Maximilien Branicki
- (Belgium) Augustin Meurmans
- (Belgium) Herni Raes
- (Belgium) Gregory Stockbroekx
- (Belgium) Ethan Tombroff
- (Belgium) Stanley Verhoeven
- (England) Thomas Crowson
- (England) Elliot Hibell
- (Ireland) Fred Morris
- (Ireland) Jonathan Mullins
- (Ireland) Matthew Nelson
- (Ireland) David Nolan
- (Ireland) Keith O'Hare
- (Netherlands) Camil Papa
- (Russia) Aleksandr Gilev
- (Spain) Arnau de Bruijn
- (Spain) Marc Escudé

1 goal

- (Belgium) Louis Capelle
- (Belgium) Loïc Sidler
- (Belgium) Arthur de Sloover
- (England) Laurence Bowden
- (England) Nicholas Page
- (England) Edward Way
- (Germany) Niklas Bosserhoff
- (Germany) Leopold Harms
- (Germany) Thies Prinz
- (Germany) Tobias Terber
- (Germany) Maximilian Werner
- (Ireland) Ziggy de Boe-Agnew
- (Ireland) Geoffrey Cole
- (Ireland) Zachary McClelland
- (Ireland) Callum Robson
- (Netherlands) Jasper Brinkman
- (Netherlands) Jonas de Geus
- (Netherlands) Steijn van Heijningen
- (Netherlands) Bram Huijbregts
- (Netherlands) Bart Kronenberg
- (Scotland) Patrick Christie
- (Scotland) Robert Harwood
- (Scotland) Joseph McConnell
- (Scotland) Ryan McCurry
- (Scotland) Christopher McFadden
- (Scotland) Aidan McQuade
- (Scotland) Andrew Webb
- (Spain) José Basterra
- (Spain) Xavier Gispert
- (Spain) Eduardo González
- (Spain) Álvaro López-Alonso
- (Spain) Marc Miralles

Source: EHF
