= 2012–13 Euro Hockey League =

Sixth season of the Euro Hockey League

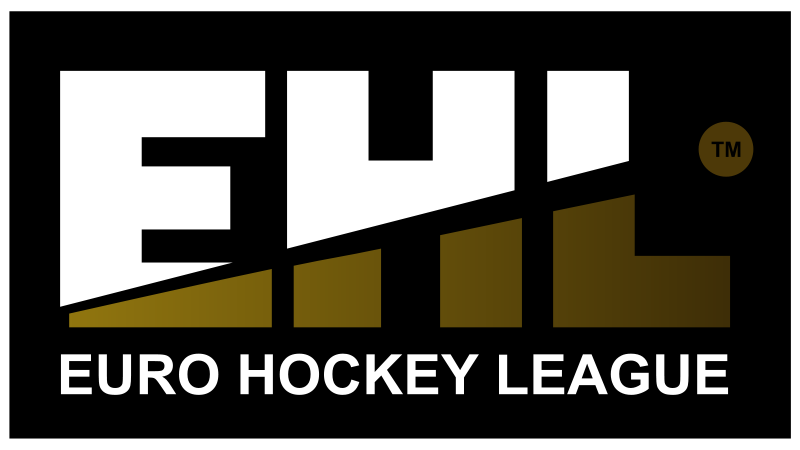

Tournament details
- Dates: 12 October 2012 – 19 May 2013
- Teams: 24
- Venue: 4 (in 4 host cities)

Final positions
- Champions: (Netherlands) Bloemendaal (2nd title)
- Runner-up: (Belgium) Dragons
- Third place: (Netherlands) Amsterdam

Tournament statistics
- Matches played: 40
- Goals scored: 229 (5.73 per match)

The 2012–13 Euro Hockey League was the sixth season of the Euro Hockey League, Europe's premier club field hockey tournament organized by the EHF. It was held at four different locations from October 2012 to May 2013.

The final was played between Bloemendaal and Dragons at Sportpark 't Kopje, in Bloemendaal, Netherlands. The hosts Bloemendaal defeated Dragons 2–0 to win their second title. UHC Hamburg were the defending champions but they did not qualify for this season's edition. Amsterdam took the bronze medal.

== Teams ==
Champions
(Netherlands) Amsterdam	(Spain) Atlètic Terrassa	(Ireland) Lisnagarvey
(Germany) Berliner HC	(Russia) Dinamo Kazan	(Poland) Grunwald Poznań
(England) Reading	(France) Lille	(Belarus) Stroitel Brest
(Belgium) Waterloo Ducks	(Scotland) Kelburne	(Austria) AHTC Wien
Runners-up		Third placed
(Netherlands) Rotterdam	(Spain) Club de Campo	(Netherlands) Bloemendaal
(Germany) Rot-Weiss Köln	(Russia) Izmaylovo	(Germany) Uhlenhorst Mülheim
(England) East Grinstead	(France) Saint Germain	(England) Beeston
(Belgium) Dragons	(Scotland) Grange	(Belgium) Léopold

== Group phase ==
The 24 teams were drawn into eight pools of three. In each pool, teams played against each other once in a round-robin format. The pool winners and runners-up advanced to the round of 16. Pools A, C, E, and F were played in Barcelona, Spain from 12 to 14 October 2012 and the other pools were played in East Grinstead, England from 26 to 28 October 2012. If a game was won, the winning team received five points. A draw resulted in both teams receiving two points. A loss gave the losing team one point unless the losing team lost by three or more goals, then they received zero points.

=== Pool A ===
Pos	Team	Pld	W	D	L	GF	GA	GD	Pts	Qualification
1	(England) Beeston	2	2	0	0	11	4	+7	10	Advance to knockout stage
2	(Netherlands) Amsterdam	2	0	1	1	6	7	−1	3	Advance to knockout stage
3	(Poland) Grunwald Poznań	2	0	1	1	2	8	−6	2	

Source: EHF

12 October 2012
09:30

Beeston (England)	6–0	(Poland) Grunwald Poznań
Ames 45'; Arnold 47'; Egerton 48', 51', 59'; Martin 70+'	Report

Pau Negre Stadium, Barcelona
Umpires:
Coen van Bunge (NED)
Sebastien Duterme (BEL)

13 October 2012
09:30

Amsterdam (Netherlands)	4–5	(England) Beeston
Freixa 6'; Oliva 20'; Bakker 41'; Taekema 56'	Report	Ames 27', 62'; Dixon 45'; Jones 61'; Wadsley 65'

Pau Negre Stadium, Barcelona
Umpires:
Fabian Blasch (GER)
Gregory Maya-Perez (FRA)

14 October 2012
09:30

Amsterdam (Netherlands)	2–2	(Poland) Grunwald Poznań
Taekema 35+', 42'	Report	Marcinkowski 26', 30'

Pau Negre Stadium, Barcelona
Umpires:
Warren McCully (IRL)
Benjamin Mauss (FRA)

=== Pool B ===
Pos	Team	Pld	W	D	L	GF	GA	GD	Pts	Qualification
1	(Belgium) Dragons	2	2	0	0	6	4	+2	10	Advance to knockout stage
2	(England) Reading	2	1	0	1	5	5	0	6	Advance to knockout stage
3	(France) Saint Germain	2	0	0	2	2	4	−2	2	

Source: EHF

26 October 2012
12:00

Dragons (Belgium)	2–1	(France) Saint Germain
Luypaert 16'; J. Thys 58'	Report	Pauchet 8'

Saint Hill, East Grinstead
Umpires:
Will Drury (WAL)
Jonas van 't Hek (NED)

27 October 2012
12:00

Reading (England)	3–4	(Belgium) Dragons
S. Mantell 2'; Peel 32'; Clarke 51'	Report	Van Minde 11', 40'; Luypaert 49'; J. Thys 55'

Saint Hill, East Grinstead
Umpires:
Geoff Conn (IRL)
Roderick Wijsmuller (NED)

28 October 2012
12:00

Reading (England)	2–1	(France) Saint Germain
Cargo 38'; Carson 69'	Report	Pauchet 9'

Saint Hill, East Grinstead
Umpires:
Gregory Uyttenhove (BEL)
Jonas van 't Hek (NED)

=== Pool C ===
Pos	Team	Pld	W	D	L	GF	GA	GD	Pts	Qualification
1	(Netherlands) Rotterdam	2	1	1	0	15	2	+13	7	Advance to knockout stage
2	(Germany) Berliner HC	2	1	1	0	10	2	+8	7	Advance to knockout stage
3	(Scotland) Grange	2	0	0	2	0	21	−21	0	

Source: EHF

12 October 2012
17:00

Rotterdam (Netherlands)	13–0	(Scotland) Grange
J. Hertzberger 4', 29', 54', 60', 62'; Child 24'; Melkert 31', 52', 65'; Wilson 44'; Gerretsen 48'; Campbell 69'; Van den Berg 70'	Report

Pau Negre Stadium, Barcelona
Umpires:
Gregory Maya-Perez (FRA)
Warren McCully (IRL)

13 October 2012
17:00

Berliner HC (Germany)	8–0	(Scotland) Grange
Häner 13', 29', 43'; R. Braun 22'; Lim 34'; Zwicker 38'; Gomoll 39'; Cartsburg 49'	Report

Pau Negre Stadium, Barcelona
Umpires:
Jakub Mejzlik (CZE)
Sebastien Duterme (BEL)

14 October 2012
17:00

Berliner HC (Germany)	2–2	(Netherlands) Rotterdam
Ebeling 14'; O.G. 64'	Report	J. Hertzberger 18+'; Wilson 46'

Pau Negre Stadium, Barcelona
Umpires:
Michael Gholami-Eilmer (AUT)
Sebastien Duterme (BEL)

=== Pool D ===
Pos	Team	Pld	W	D	L	GF	GA	GD	Pts	Qualification
1	(Belgium) Waterloo Ducks	2	2	0	0	6	1	+5	10	Advance to knockout stage
2	(England) East Grinstead (H)	2	1	0	1	6	2	+4	6	Advance to knockout stage
3	(Belarus) Stroitel Brest	2	0	0	2	0	9	−9	0	

Source: EHF
(H) Hosts

26 October 2012
17:00

East Grinstead (England)	5–0	(Belarus) Stroitel Brest
Piper 23', 34'; Pearn 27'; Kirkham 32'; Jordan 45'	Report

Saint Hill, East Grinstead
Umpires:
Gregory Uyttenhove (BEL)
Pawel Linkowski (POL)

27 October 2012
17:00

Waterloo Ducks (Belgium)	4–0	(Belarus) Stroitel Brest
Luycx 6'; Capelle 13'; De Saedeleer 39'; Cosyns 55'	Report

Saint Hill, East Grinstead
Umpires:
Michal Margolien (SVK)
Andres Ortiz (ESP)

28 October 2012
17:00

Waterloo Ducks (Belgium)	2–1	(England) East Grinstead
Cosyns 3'; Brogdon 28'	Report	Gay 41'

Saint Hill, East Grinstead
Umpires:
Pawel Linkowski (POL)
Geoff Conn (IRL)

=== Pool E ===
Pos	Team	Pld	W	D	L	GF	GA	GD	Pts	Qualification
1	(Spain) Atlètic Terrassa	2	1	1	0	7	3	+4	7	Advance to knockout stage
2	(Belgium) Léopold	2	1	1	0	7	4	+3	7	Advance to knockout stage
3	(Russia) Izmaylovo	2	0	0	2	1	8	−7	0	

Source: EHF

12 October 2012
12:00

Léopold (Belgium)	4–1	(Russia) Izmaylovo
Van Strydonck 13'; Tys 13'; A. Verdussen 65'; Mazzilli 69'	Report	Komarov 16'

Pau Negre Stadium, Barcelona
Umpires:
Bruce Bale (ENG)
Jakub Mejzlik (CZE)

13 October 2012
12:00

Atlètic Terrassa (Spain)	4–0	(Russia) Izmaylovo
Pablo 20'; Sallés 26'; Enrique 60'; Béltran 70'	Report

Pau Negre Stadium, Barcelona
Umpires:
Coen van Bunge (NED)
Benjamin Mauss (FRA)

14 October 2012
12:00

Atlètic Terrassa (Spain)	3–3	(Belgium) Léopold
O.G. 17', 51'; Freixa 66'	Report	Rossi 31'; Beckers 48'; Tys 52'

Pau Negre Stadium, Barcelona
Umpires:
Fabian Blasch (GER)
Bruce Bale (ENG)

=== Pool F ===
Pos	Team	Pld	W	D	L	GF	GA	GD	Pts	Qualification
1	(Germany) Uhlenhorst Mülheim	2	1	0	1	7	5	+2	6	Advance to knockout stage
2	(Spain) Club de Campo	2	1	0	1	6	6	0	6	Advance to knockout stage
3	(Russia) Dinamo Kazan	2	1	0	1	4	6	−2	5	

Source: EHF

12 October 2012
14:30

Dinamo Kazan (Russia)	3–2	(Spain) Club de Campo
Kornilov 11'; Siuskin 16'; Warsi 52'	Report	O.G. 28', 48'

Pau Negre Stadium, Barcelona
Umpires:
Michael Gholami-Eilmer (AUT)
Fabian Blasch (GER)

13 October 2012
14:30

Dinamo Kazan (Russia)	1–4	(Germany) Uhlenhorst Mülheim
Nikolaev 65'	Report	Stralkowski 38', 56'; Fürk 39'; Windfeder 51'

Pau Negre Stadium, Barcelona
Umpires:
Bruce Bale (ENG)
Warren McCully (IRL)

14 October 2012
14:30

Uhlenhorst Mülheim (Germany)	3–4	(Spain) Club de Campo
Fürk 30'; Keusgen 50'; Schmiedel 68'	Report	Fürste 14'; Lasso 51', 53'; Deecke 55'

Pau Negre Stadium, Barcelona
Umpires:
Coen van Bunge (NED)
Jakub Mejzlik (CZE)

=== Pool G ===
Pos	Team	Pld	W	D	L	GF	GA	GD	Pts	Qualification
1	(Netherlands) Bloemendaal	2	2	0	0	10	2	+8	10	Advance to knockout stage
2	(Ireland) Lisnagarvey	2	0	1	1	3	6	−3	2	Advance to knockout stage
3	(France) Lille	2	0	1	1	5	10	−5	2	

Source: EHF

26 October 2012
14:30

Lille (France)	2–7	(Netherlands) Bloemendaal
V. Lockwood 34'; Mondaca 70'	Report	Hofman 8'; Bovendeert 14', 49'; O. Meijer 20'; De Nooijer 43', 50'; Brouwer 66'

Saint Hill, East Grinstead
Umpires:
Geoff Conn (IRL)
Andres Ortiz (ESP)

27 October 2012
14:30

Lille (France)	3–3	(Ireland) Lisnagarvey
Mondaca 14'; Clin 15'; Schambert 31'	Report	Cockram 55', 59'; Stirling 57'

Saint Hill, East Grinstead
Umpires:
Pawel Linkowski (POL)
Moritz Meissner (GER)

28 October 2012
14:30

Bloemendaal (Netherlands)	3–0	(Ireland) Lisnagarvey
Martens 58'; Brouwer 60'; Bovendeert 63'	Report

Saint Hill, East Grinstead
Umpires:
Moritz Meissner (GER)
Andres Ortiz (ESP)

=== Pool H ===
Pos	Team	Pld	W	D	L	GF	GA	GD	Pts	Qualification
1	(Germany) Rot-Weiss Köln	2	2	0	0	20	2	+18	10	Advance to knockout stage
2	(Scotland) Kelburne	2	1	0	1	4	9	−5	5	Advance to knockout stage
3	(Austria) AHTC Wien	2	0	0	2	2	15	−13	1	

Source: EHF

26 October 2012
09:30

Kelburne (Scotland)	1–8	(Germany) Rot-Weiss Köln
Peterson 35'	Report	Becuwe 6'; Miltkau 16', 44'; J. M. Montag 34', 53+', 58'; C. Zeller 56'; Schöllkopf 68'

Saint Hill, East Grinstead
Umpires:
Michal Margolien (SVK)
Roderick Wijsmuller (NED)

27 October 2012
09:30

Kelburne (Scotland)	3–1	(Austria) AHTC Wien
Marshall 12'; A. Forsyth 40'; J. Christie 65'	Report	Amtmanski 5'

Saint Hill, East Grinstead
Umpires:
Gregory Uyttenhove (BEL)
Jonas van 't Hek (NED)

28 October 2012
09:30

Rot-Weiss Köln (Germany)	12–1	(Austria) AHTC Wien
Miltkau 2', 7', 68'; Thiel 3'; J. M. Montag 14'; Meurer 15', 69'; C. Menke 21'; Trompertz 24'; C. Zeller 28', 35'; Schöllkopf 48'	Report	Gerö 66'

Saint Hill, East Grinstead
Umpires:
Will Drury (IRL)
Michal Margolien (SVK)

== Knockout stage ==
The round of 16 and the quarter-finals were played in Amstelveen, Netherlands from 29 March to 1 April 2013 and the semi-finals, bronze medal match and the final were played in Bloemendaal, Netherlands from 18 to 19 May 2013.

=== Bracket ===
Round of 16
29 March
(Germany) Uhlenhorst Mülheim	5
(Scotland) Kelburne	0
29 March
(Germany) Rot-Weiss Köln	3
(Belgium) Léopold	2
29 March
(Netherlands) Rotterdam	2 (3)
(England) Reading (s.o.)	2 (4)
29 March
(Belgium) Dragons	7
(Ireland) Lisnagarvey	2
30 March
(England) Beeston (a.e.t.)	3
(England) East Grinstead	2
30 March
(Netherlands) Bloemendaal	6
(Spain) Club de Campo	1
30 March
(Spain) Atlètic Terrassa	1
(Netherlands) Amsterdam	2
30 March
(Belgium) Waterloo Ducks	0
(Germany) Berliner HC	3

Quarter-finals
31 March
(Germany) Uhlenhorst Mülheim	2
(Germany) Rot-Weiss Köln (a.e.t.)	3
31 March
(England) Reading	1
(Belgium) Dragons	5
1 April
(England) Beeston	1
(Netherlands) Bloemendaal	4
1 April
(Netherlands) Amsterdam	3
(Germany) Berliner HC	2

Semi-finals
18 May
(Germany) Rot-Weiss Köln	4 (4)
(Belgium) Dragons (s.o.)	4 (5)
18 May
(Netherlands) Bloemendaal (s.o.)	2 (3)
(Netherlands) Amsterdam	2 (1)

Final
19 May
(Belgium) Dragons	0
(Netherlands) Bloemendaal	2
Bronze medal match
19 May
(Germany) Rot-Weiss Köln	3
(Netherlands) Amsterdam	5

=== Round of 16 ===
29 March 2013
10:00

Uhlenhorst Mülheim (Germany)	5–0	(Scotland) Kelburne
Stralkowski 5'; Rühr 20', 33'; Schmitz 24', 49'	Report

Wagener Stadium, Amstelveen
Umpires:
Gregory Uyttenhove (BEL)
Dan Barstow (ENG)

29 March 2013
12:00

Rot-Weiss Köln (Germany)	3–2	(Belgium) Léopold
Mitlkau 16'; Weissenborn 38'; C. Zeller 52'	Report	A. Verdussen 36'; J. Verdussen 67'

Wagener Stadium, Amstelveen
Umpires:
Marcin Grochal (POL)
Jonas van 't Hek (NED)

29 March 2013
14:30

Rotterdam (Netherlands)	2–2 (a.e.t.)	(England) Reading
Campbell 19'; Wilson 42'	Report	Carson 22'; R. Mantell 63'
Penalties
Wilson (penalty shoot-out missed); J. Hertzberger (penalty shoot-out scored); Polkamp (penalty shoot-out scored); Child (penalty shoot-out scored); Edwards (penalty shoot-out missed)	3–4	(penalty shoot-out scored) S. Mantell; (penalty shoot-out scored) Cargo; (penalty shoot-out scored) Cheesman; (penalty shoot-out missed) Peel; (penalty shoot-out scored) Clarke

Wagener Stadium, Amstelveen
Umpires:
Colin Hutchinson (IRL)
Geoff Conn (IRL)

29 March 2013
17:00

Dragons (Belgium)	7–2	(Ireland) Lisnagarvey
Luypaert 14', 16', 55', 62'; Cobbaert 27'; J. Thys 37'; Van Aubel 40'	Report	Raphael 19', 33'

Wagener Stadium, Amstelveen
Umpires:
Diego Estebanez (ESP)
Mike Gerwig (GER)

30 March 2013
10:00

Beeston (England)	3–2 (a.e.t.)	(England) East Grinstead
Smith 13'; Dixon 48'; Willars 75'	Report	Kirkham 19', 25'

Wagener Stadium, Amstelveen
Umpires:
Gregory Uyttenhove (BEL)
Mike Gerwig (GER)

30 March 2013
12:00

Bloemendaal (Netherlands)	6–1	(Spain) Club de Campo
Ciriello 5', 59'; Bovendeert 33'; S. Jolie 49'; Hofman 63'; W. Jolie 68'	Report	Deecke 41'

Wagener Stadium, Amstelveen
Umpires:
Martin Madden (SCO)
Geoff Conn (IRL)

30 March 2013
14:30

Atlètic Terrassa (Spain)	1–2	(Netherlands) Amsterdam
Freixa 35'	Report	Tigges 9'; Taekema 56'

Wagener Stadium, Amstelveen
Umpires:
Marcin Grochal (POL)
Dan Barstow (ENG)

30 March 2013
17:00

Waterloo Ducks (Belgium)	0–3	(Germany) Berliner HC
	Report	Häner 29'; Gomoll 38'; Marx 43'

Wagener Stadium, Amstelveen
Umpires:
Diego Estebanez (ESP)
Jonas van 't Hek (NED)

=== Quarter-finals ===
31 March 2013
12:00

Uhlenhorst Mülheim (Germany)	2–3 (a.e.t.)	(Germany) Rot-Weiss Köln
Rabente 18'; Stralkowski 31'	Report	J. M. Montag 23'; C. Zeller 63'; Weß 75'

Wagener Stadium, Amstelveen
Umpires:
Gregory Uyttenhove (BEL)
Diego Estebanez (ESP)

31 March 2013
14:30

Reading (England)	1–5	(Belgium) Dragons
Newman 47'	Report	M. Dubois 8', 18'; Van Aubel 37'; J. Thys 64'; Luypaert 69'

Wagener Stadium, Amstelveen
Umpires:
Jonas van 't Hek (NED)
Martin Madden (SCO)

1 April 2013
12:00

Beeston (England)	1–4	(Netherlands) Bloemendaal
Willars 60'	Report	Vos 17'; Ciriello 57', 68'; W. Jolie 58'

Wagener Stadium, Amstelveen
Umpires:
Marcin Grochal (POL)
Mike Gerwig (GER)

1 April 2013
14:30

Amsterdam (Netherlands)	3–2	(Germany) Berliner HC
Pruyser 49', 57'; Freixa 50'	Report	Marx 41'; Lim 53+'

Wagener Stadium, Amstelveen
Umpires:
Colin Hutchinson (IRL)
Dan Barstow (ENG)

=== Semi-finals ===
18 May 2013
12:00

Rot-Weiss Köln (Germany)	4–4 (a.e.t.)	(Belgium) Dragons
C. Menke 17'; C. Zeller 18', 80'; Rickli 66'	Report	J. Thys 35'; Cobbaert 52'; Stumpe 66'; Denayer 76'
Penalties
C. Zeller (penalty shoot-out scored); Trompertz (penalty shoot-out scored); Miltkau (penalty shoot-out scored); Weißenborn (penalty shoot-out scored); Weß (penalty shoot-out missed)	4–5	(penalty shoot-out scored) Cobbaert; (penalty shoot-out scored) Van Aubel; (penalty shoot-out scored) Luypaert; (penalty shoot-out scored) A. Van Doren; (penalty shoot-out scored) J. Thys

Sportpark 't Kopje, Bloemendaal
Umpires:
Hamish Jamson (ENG)
Colin Hutchinson (IRL)

18 May 2013
14:30

Bloemendaal (Netherlands)	2–2 (a.e.t.)	(Netherlands) Amsterdam
Kessing 53'; Kavanagh 63'	Report	Pruyser 14', 20'
Penalties
Brouwer (penalty shoot-out missed); Swann (penalty shoot-out scored); Hofman (penalty shoot-out scored); W. Jolie (penalty shoot-out scored)	3–1	(penalty shoot-out missed) Bakker; (penalty shoot-out missed) Verga; (penalty shoot-out scored) Buissant; (penalty shoot-out missed) Leijs

Sportpark 't Kopje, Bloemendaal

=== Bronze medal match ===
19 May 2013
10:15

Rot-Weiss Köln (Germany)	3–5	(Netherlands) Amsterdam
Delarber 32'; Miltkau 47'; J. M. Montag 70'	Report	Horn 19'; Verga 40'; Taekema 46'; Bakker 60', 64'

Sportpark 't Kopje, Bloemendaal
Umpires:
Martin Madden (SCO)
Colin Hutchinson (IRL)

=== Final ===
19 May 2013
15:15

Dragons (Belgium)	0–2	(Netherlands) Bloemendaal
	Report	Hofman 21', 60'

Sportpark 't Kopje, Bloemendaal
Umpires:
Christian Blasch (GER)
Hamish Jamson (ENG)
