= Robbie Shepherdson =

Scottish field hockey player

Personal information
- Born: 24 August 1995 (age 30) Edinburgh, Scotland

Sport
- Sport: Field hockey
- Position: Defender
Senior career
Years	Team	Caps	Goals
2013–2018	Loughborough Students'	-	-
2018–2022	Grange	-	-
2022–2024	Teddington	-	-
National team
Years	Team	Caps	Goals
2016–2022	Scotland	45	-
Medal record
Representing Scotland
European Championship II
Silver medal – second place	2021 Gniezno	Team

Robbie Shepherdson (born 25 August 1995) is a Scottish field hockey player who represented the Scottish national team at the 2022 Commonwealth Games.

== Biography ==
Shepherdson was born in Edinburgh and educated at Blackhall Primary School and the Royal High School, Edinburgh. He studied Mechanical Engineering at Loughborough University. While at university he played club hockey for Loughborough Students' Hockey Club in the Men's England Hockey League.

After university he signed to play for Grange Hockey Club in the Scottish Hockey Premiership and in 2021 he helped Scotland win the silver medal at the 2021 Men's EuroHockey Championship II, in Gniezno, Poland

The following year was selected to represent Scotland at the 2022 Commonwealth Games in Birmingham, England, in the men's tournament and around the same time, he returned to play his club hockey in England with Teddington, from the 2022–23 season.
