= Hightown Hockey Club =

Former English field hockey team

Hightown
- Full name: Hightown Hockey Club
- Founded: 1914
- Dissolved: 2004

Hightown Hockey Club was a field hockey club based at Hightown, Merseyside.

The men's section of the hockey club was formed in 1914 and was part of the Hightown Club which ran several sports including cricket, rugby, tennis and football. The women's section was formed later and became one of the leading clubs in England winning three league championships and four national cup wins.

The men's team disbanded following the 1980s merger with the Northern Hockey Club and in 2004 the women's team merged with Bowdon Hockey Club which ended the hockey association with the village of Hightown.

== Major National Honours ==
National champions

- 1995–96 Women's League Champions
- 1999–2000 Women's League Champions
- 2003–04 Women's League Champions

National Cup Winners

- 1991–92 Women's National Cup Winners
- 1994–95 Women's National Cup Winners
- 1996–97 Women's National Cup Winners
- 2003–04 Women's National Cup Winners

== Notable players ==
=== Men's internationals ===
Extended content

Player	Events/Notes	Ref
(Wales) Cemlyn Foulkes	CT (1978, 1980)	
(Wales) Austin Savage	Welsh caps from 1977	
(England) Colin Whalley	Oly (1968), WC (1973, 1975)	

Key

- Oly = Olympic Games
- CG = Commonwealth Games
- WC = World Cup
- CT = Champions Trophy
- EC = European Championships

=== Women's internationals ===
Extended content

Player	Events/Notes	Ref
(England) Maggie Souyave		

Key

- Oly = Olympic Games
- CG = Commonwealth Games
- WC = World Cup
- CT = Champions Trophy
- EC = European Championships
