= David Savage (disambiguation) =

David Savage may refer to:

- David Savage (1830–1893), an English-born Canadian Methodist minister
- Dave Savage (born 1973), Irish footballer
- David Savage, singer of the English 1990s synthpop duo Sexus, part of the Romo movement
- Austin Savage (field hockey), (1940–2024), Welsh field hockey Olympian with the first name David

== See also ==
- David McSavage (1965/1966), Irish comedy writer and comic
- Dan Savage (1964), American journalist and activist
