= Robert Todd (field hockey) =

British field hockey player

Personal information
- Born: 1975 (age 50–51) Epsom, England

Sport
- Sport: Field hockey
- Position: Defender
Senior career
Years	Team	Caps	Goals
1993–1995	Gloucester City	-	-
1995–1996	Havant	-	-
1996–2006	Reading	-	-
National team
Years	Team	Caps	Goals
–	GB	14	-
–	England	63	-
Medal record
Men's field hockey
Representing England
European Championship
Bronze medal – third place	2003 Barcelona	Team

Robert Todd (born 1975) is a British former field hockey player who played for GB and England.

== Biography ==
Todd was born in Epsom, England, and educated at Millfield. While at Millfield, he played a few games for Brean Hockey Club and then signed for Gloucester City in the Men's England Hockey League second division in 1993. He moved on to division 1 side Havant for the 1995/96 season.

He left Havant to play club hockey for Reading for the 1996/97 season and experienced success in his first season with them, winning the league title during the 1996–97 England Hockey League season.

Todd made his England debut against Japan in 1999 and participated at the 2002 Men's Hockey World Cup in March 2002 and shortly afterwards in July represented England at the 2002 Commonwealth Games in Manchester, where he helped England finish in fifth position.

In January 2003, Todd, an investment banker by trade was voted British player of the year by the Hockey Writers Club and also became the club captain at Reading.

During his career at Reading, the team won multiple national trophies, including, English Hockey League Premierships (1996/97, 2000/01, 2001/02), English Hockey League Playoffs (2001/02, 2002/03, 2003/04), English Hockey Association Cups (1998/99, 1999/00, 2002/03, 2003/04) and English Hockey Association Indoor Cup (1997/98).

Reading also successfully won the European Club Hockey Championship (A Division) in 2002/03 hosted at the Royal Leopold Club in Belgium.

At international retirement Todd has won 14 caps for Great Britain and 63 caps for England.
