= 2011–12 División de Honor de Hockey Hierba =

División de Honor
- Season: 2011–12
- Dates: 25 September 2011 – 29 April 2012
- Champions: Atlètic Terrassa (20th title)
- Relegated: Barcelona; Benalmádena
- Euro Hockey League: Atlètic Terrassa; Club de Campo
- Matches played: 102
- Goals scored: 481 (4.72 per match)
- Top goalscorer: Gabriel Dabanch (20 goals)
- Biggest home win: Atlètic Terrassa 9–0 CD Terrassa
- Biggest away win: Barcelona 0–10 Club de Campo
- Highest scoring: Barcelona 0–10 Club de Campo; Atlètic Terrassa 8–2 Pozuelo; Benalmádena 2–8 Real Club de Polo; Club Egara 3–7 Atlètic Terrassa

The 2011–12 División de Honor de Hockey Hierba was the 46th season of the División de Honor de Hockey Hierba, the highest field hockey league in Spain. The season began on 25 September 2011 and concluded on 29 April 2012.

== Competition ==
=== Format ===
The División de Honor season takes place between September and April, and it divides into two phases. In the first phase every team playing each other once for a total of 11 matches. Upon completion of the first phase, the standings split into two groups of 6 teams each one. In group A, the top team wins the championship. In group B, the two bottom teams are relegated. Points are awarded according to the following:

- 2 points for a win
- 1 point for a draw

Upon completion of the second phase, the top team from group A become champions.

=== Promotion and relegation ===
Upon completion, the second phase, the two bottom teams from group B are relegated to División de Honor B, while the two top teams from División de Honor B are promoted.

== Teams ==
Location of teams in the 2011–12 División de Honor
Location of teams in the 2011–12 División de Honor (Canary Islands)

Team	Location	Autonomous Community	Stadium
Atlètic Terrassa	Terrassa	Catalonia	Estadi de Hockey Josep Marquès
Atlètico San Sebastián	San Sebastián	Basque Country	Bidebieta
Barcelona	Barcelona	Catalonia	Pau Negre Stadium
Benalmádena	Benalmádena	Andalusia	La Estupa
CD Terrassa	Matadepera	Catalonia	Les Pedritxes
Club de Campo	Madrid	Madrid	Club de Campo
Club Egara	Terrassa	Catalonia	Pla de Bon Aire
Complutense	Madrid	Madrid	San Sebastián de los Reyes
Las Palmas	Las Palmas	Canary Islands	Campo de Hockey Gran Canaria
Pozuelo	Pozuelo de Alarcón	Madrid	Valle de las Cañas
Real Club de Polo	Barcelona	Catalonia	Eduardo Dualde
Tenis	Santander	Cantabria	Ruth Beita

=== Number of teams by autonomous community ===
Autonomous Community	Number of teams	Teams
Catalonia	5	Atlètic Terrassa, Barcelona, CD Terrassa, Club Egara and Real Club de Polo
Madrid	3	Club de Campo, Complutense and Pozuelo
Andalusia	1	Benalmádena
Basque Country	1	Atlètico San Sebastián
Canary Islands	1	Las Palmas
Cantabria	1	Tenis
Total	12	

== Regular season ==
=== League table ===
Pos	Team	Pld	W	D	L	GF	GA	GD	Pts	Qualification
1	Atlètic Terrassa	11	10	1	0	48	12	+36	21	Qualification for the Championship round
2	Real Club de Polo	11	9	1	1	47	12	+35	19	Qualification for the Championship round
3	Club de Campo	11	9	1	1	54	15	+39	19	Qualification for the Championship round
4	Club Egara	11	5	4	2	28	16	+12	14	Qualification for the Championship round
5	Complutense	11	4	3	4	22	25	−3	11	Qualification for the Championship round
6	CD Terrassa	11	3	3	5	17	27	−10	9	Qualification for the Championship round
7	Pozuelo	11	2	4	5	19	34	−15	8	Qualification for the Relegation round
8	Tenis	11	3	2	6	21	29	−8	8	Qualification for the Relegation round
9	Atlético San Sebastián	11	3	2	6	23	33	−10	8	Qualification for the Relegation round
10	Benalmádena	11	3	1	7	14	38	−24	7	Qualification for the Relegation round
11	Las Palmas	11	2	1	8	13	29	−16	5	Qualification for the Relegation round
12	Barcelona	11	1	1	9	3	39	−36	3	Qualification for the Relegation round

Source: RFEH

=== Results ===
Home \ Away	ATL	ASS	BAR	BEN	CDT	CDC	EGA	COM	LPA	POZ	RCP	TEN
Atlètic Terrassa	—	—	—	5–1	—	—	3–2	5–1	6–0	8–2	2–1	—
Atlético San Sebastián	1–3	—	—	—	3–1	—	0–0	—	5–0	2–2	—	—
Barcelona	0–8	0–2	—	—	—	0–10	—	—	1–0	—	0–5	0–2
Benalmádena	—	3–2	1–0	—	—	—	0–6	—	2–1	—	2–8	—
CD Terrassa	0–3	—	2–0	4–0	—	2–6	0–3	—	1–0	—	—	—
Club de Campo	2–2	5–1	—	6–1	—	—	—	5–1	—	—	2–3	—
Club Egara	—	—	3–0	—	—	1–4	—	1–1	1–1	3–2	—	—
Complutense	—	4–2	4–0	2–1	2–2	—	—	—	—	—	1–4	2–2
Las Palmas	—	—	—	—	—	3–6	—	1–3	—	3–0	1–3	3–1
Pozuelo	—	—	2–2	2–2	3–3	0–4	—	2–1	—	—	—	3–2
Real Club de Polo	—	6–0	—	—	5–0	—	2–2	—	—	4–1	—	6–1
Tenis	2–3	5–3	—	2–1	2–2	1–4	3–6	—	—	—	—	—

Source: RFEH
Legend: Blue = home team win; Yellow = draw; Red = away team win.

== Championship round ==
=== League table ===
Pos	Team	Pld	W	D	L	GF	GA	GD	Pts	Qualification
1	Atlètic Terrassa (C)	6	5	1	0	32	11	+21	11	Qualification for the Euro Hockey League
2	Real Club de Polo	6	4	2	0	20	7	+13	10	
3	Club de Campo	6	3	1	2	22	19	+3	7	Qualification for the Euro Hockey League (Note: Club de Campo qualified for the Euro Hockey League by winning the 2012 Copa del Rey.)
4	Club Egara	6	0	3	3	9	16	−7	3	
5	CD Terrassa	6	1	1	4	7	26	−19	3	
6	Complutense	6	0	2	4	8	19	−11	2	

Source: RFEH
(C) Champions

=== Results ===
Home \ Away	ATL	CDT	CDC	EGA	COM	RCP
Atlètic Terrassa	—	9–0	6–2	3–2	–	–
CD Terrassa	–	—	–	1–1	3–2	1–2
Club de Campo	–	7–2	—	3–2	5–1	–
Club Egara	3–7	1–1	–	—	–	2–2
Complutense	1–4	–	4–4	0–0	—	–
Real Club de Polo	3–3	5–0	5–1	–	3–0	—

Source: RFEH
Legend: Blue = home team win; Yellow = draw; Red = away team win.

== Relegation round ==
=== League table ===
Pos	Team	Pld	W	D	L	GF	GA	GD	Pts	Relegation
7	Atlético San Sebastián	6	3	2	1	14	8	+6	8	
8	Las Palmas	6	3	2	1	10	11	−1	8	
9	Tenis	6	3	1	2	18	16	+2	7	
10	Pozuelo	6	1	4	1	13	13	0	6	
11	Barcelona (R)	6	1	2	3	10	13	−3	4	Relegation to the División de Honor Masculina B
12	Benalmádena (R)	6	0	3	3	9	13	−4	3	Relegation to the División de Honor Masculina B

Source: RFEH
(R) Relegated

=== Results ===
Home \ Away	ASS	BAR	BEN	LPA	POZ	TEN
Atlético San Sebastián	—	2–1	0–0	5–0	–	4–3
Barcelona	–	—	2–0	–	4–4	0–2
Benalmádena	–	–	—	–	1–2	4–5
Las Palmas	2–1	2–0	2–2	—	–	–
Pozuelo	2–2	–	2–2	1–1	—	–
Tenis	–	3–3	–	2–3	3–2	—

Source: RFEH
Legend: Blue = home team win; Yellow = draw; Red = away team win.

== Top goalscorers ==
Rank	Player	Club	Goals
1	(Spain) Gabriel Dabanch	Real Club de Polo	20
2	(Spain) Santi Freixa	Atlètic Terrassa	18
2	(Spain) Jorge Rodriguez	Club de Campo	18
4	(Spain) Roger Padros	Real Club de Polo	17
5	(Spain) Diego Arana	Club de Campo	12
5	(Spain) Peio Azkoaga	Atlético San Sebastián	12
5	(Spain) Roc Oliva	Atlètic Terrassa	12
8	(Spain) Xavi Lleonart	CD Terrassa	10
9	(Spain) Ignasi Guerrero	Atlètic Terrassa	9
9	(Spain) Bernardo Guerrero	Benalmádena	9
9	(Spain) Juan Lainz	Club de Campo	9
9	(Ireland) Michael Watt	Tenis	9
