= Phil McGuire =

Phil McGuire may refer to:

- Phil McGuire (footballer) (born 1980), Scottish footballer
- Phil McGuire (field hockey) (born 1970), British former field hockey player
