= Edward Greaves =

Edward Greaves may refer to:

- Edward Greaves (Australian politician) (1910–1964), member of the New South Wales Legislative Assembly
- Edward Greaves (MP) (1803–1879), English banker and Conservative politician
- Sir Edward Greaves, 1st Baronet (1608–1680), English royal physician
- Edward Evelyn Greaves (born 1940), High Commissioner of Barbados to Canada
- Ed Greaves (born 1995), Scottish field hockey player
