= James Bailey (field hockey) =

English field hockey player

Personal information
- Born: 13 May 1991 (age 35) Bath, England
- Height: 6 ft 2 in (188 cm)
- Spouse: Lucinda Bailey (m. 2021)

Sport
- Sport: Field hockey
- Position: Goalkeeper
Senior career
Years	Team	Caps	Goals
2011	Team Bath Buccaneers	-	-
2012–2014	Reading	-	-
2014–2024	Wimbledon	-	-
National team
Years	Team	Caps	Goals
–	England & GB		-

James Bailey (born 13 May 1991) is an English international field hockey player who played as a goalkeeper for England and Great Britain.

== Biography ==
Bailey played club hockey in the Men's England Hockey League for Reading and made his England international debut on 6 June 2013 against Belgium.

He has also played for Old Loughtonians.

Bailey joined Premier Division side Wimbledon in 2014 and participated in the 2014 Men's Hockey World Cup and was named as reserve for Great Britain at the 2016 Olympic Games in Rio de Janeiro.
