= Zak Jones (field hockey) =

Welsh field hockey player (born 1973)

Personal information
- Born: 2 December 1973 (age 52)

Sport
- Sport: Field hockey
- Position: Midfield
Senior career
Years	Team	Caps	Goals
1996–1999	Hounslow	-	-
1999–2006	Canterbury	-	-
2006–2010	Beeston	-	-
National team
Years	Team	Caps	Goals
–	Wales		-

Zak Jones (born 2 December 1973) is the head coach of the Great Britain and England national teams and previously coached the Welsh team. He is also former field hockey player who captained Wales at the 2002 Commonwealth Games and played at the 1998 Commonwealth Games. His brother is Huw Jones.

== Biography ==
Jones was playing club hockey for Hounslow Hockey Club in the Men's England Hockey League, when he represented Wales at the 1998 Commonwealth Games. He moved from Hounslow to Canterbury Hockey Club and started coaching around the same time for Wokingham Hockey Club. Jones then represented and captained Wales at the 2002 Commonwealth Games in Manchester. before becoming the coach of women's team at the Buckingham Hockey Club.

In 2006/07 he moved to Beeston Hockey Club where he would become the player/head coach.

In 2014, Jones, coached Wales at the 2014 Commonwealth Games in Glasgow and the 2019 Men's EuroHockey Championship.

In July 2020, Jones left Wales to become the assistant coach to Danny Kerry for the Great Britain team and England teams. In January 2022, he became England interim coach following the resignation of Kerry.

On 5 March 2025 he was announced as the new head coach for both Great Britain and England.
