= Michael Leonard (field hockey) =

Scottish field hockey player and cricketer

Personal information
- Born: 20 February 1974 (age 52) Knutsford, Cheshire, England

Sport
- Sport: Field hockey
Senior career
Years	Team	Caps	Goals
2001–	Grange	-	-
National team
Years	Team	Caps	Goals
1996–	Scotland		-

Michael Leonard (born 20 February) is an English born former field hockey defender who played for Scotland.

== Biography ==
Leonard earned his first cap for the Scotland men's national field hockey team in 1996. He played club hockey for Grange in the Scottish leagues.

Leonard captained and was part of the Scotland Commonwealth Games team at the 2006 Commonwealth Games in Melbourne. He made his 100th appearance for the Scotland men's national field hockey team during the tournament.

Leonard has also been capped six times for the Scotland B cricket team.

After retiring from playing Leonard went into coaching and was the head coach of Watsonians from 2018 to 2020.
