= Tommy Alexander =

Scottish field hockey player

Personal information
- Born: 11 September 1989 (age 36) Chertsey, Surrey, England

Sport
- Sport: Field hockey
- Position: Goalkeeper
Senior career
Years	Team	Caps	Goals
–	Indian Gymkhana	-	-
2010–2011	Surbiton	-	-
–2014	Indian Gymkhana	-	-
2014–2018	Reading	-	-
2019–2025	Alster	-	-
National team
Years	Team	Caps	Goals
–	Scotland	85	-
Medal record
Representing Scotland
European Championship II
Gold medal – first place	2017 Glasgow	Team
Silver medal – second place	2021 Gniezno	Team
Bronze medal – third place	2023 Dublin	Team

Thomas Alexander (born 11 September 1989) is a Scottish field hockey player who represented the Scottish national team at two Commonwealth Games.

== Biography ==
Alexander was educated at Hall Grove School and Pangbourne College.

Playing for Reading Hockey Club in the Men's England Hockey League as a goalkeeper, he was a three-times winner of the Hockey Association Cup from 2015 to 2018.

Alexander won a gold medal with Scotland at the 2017 Men's EuroHockey Championship II in Glasgow and represented Scotland at the 2018 Commonwealth Games in Gold Coast, Australia, in the men's tournament.

He played for Scotland at the 2019 Men's EuroHockey Championship. In 2021 and 2023, he helped Scotland win the silver and bronze medals at the 2021 Men's EuroHockey Championship II in Gniezno, Poland and the 2023 Men's EuroHockey Championship II in Dublin.

In between the two medal wins in 2022, he was selected to represent Scotland at the 2022 Commonwealth Games in Birmingham, England, in the men's tournament.
