= Livy Paige =

English field hockey player

Personal information
- Born: 28 July 1996 (age 30) England

Sport
- Sport: Field hockey
- Position: Midfielder
- Club: Hampstead & Westminster
National team
Years	Team	Caps	Goals
2017–2017	England	7	(0)
2017–	Great Britain	0	(0)
Medal record
Women's field hockey
Representing England

Olivia 'Livy' Paige (born 28 July 1996) is an English international field hockey player who played as a midfielder for England and Great Britain.

She plays club hockey in the Women's England Hockey League Premier Division for Hampstead & Westminster.

Paige has also played for hdm, Uni of Birmingham, Reading and Marlow.
