= Cemlyn Foulkes =

British field hockey player

Personal information
- Born: Q4. 1949 Borough of Fylde, Lancashire, England
- Died: 30 July 2014 (aged 64)

Sport
- Sport: Field hockey
Senior career
Years	Team	Caps	Goals
1969	Crosby	-	-
1970–1981	Hightown	-	-
National team
Years	Team	Caps	Goals
1978–1980	Great Britain		-
1969–1981	Wales		-
Medal record
Field hockey
Representing Great Britain
Champions Trophy
Bronze medal – third place	1978 Lahore	Team competition

James Edward Cemlyn Foulkes (1949 – 30 July 2014) was a former British and Welsh hockey international. He was selected for the 1980 Summer Olympics.

== Biography ==
Foulkes was educated at Croxton Preparatory School in Southport and Millfield School. He studied mathematics and natural sciences at Downing College, Cambridge.

At Cambridge he won his field hockey blue and made his international debut for Wales against Ireland in Dublin in 1969. After leaving university he took up a position with Denbighshire County Council.

He played club hockey for Crosby, Hightown, Wrexham and Denbigh and in 1974 helped Wales win their first triple crown.

He was part of the bronze medal winning Great Britain team that competed at the inaugural 1978 Men's Hockey Champions Trophy, in Lahore, Pakistan. Foulkes went to his second Champions Trophy in 1980 and was selected for the Great Britain team for the 1980 Olympic Games in Moscow, but subsequently did not attend due to the boycott.

After he retired from playing he was President of the Welsh Masters' Hockey Association and in 1996 he became Head of Exchequer and Financial Accountancy with the council until his retirement in 2009.
