= Billy McLean (field hockey) =

British field hockey player

Sport
- Sport: Field hockey
- Position: Forward
Senior career
Years	Team	Caps	Goals
1967–1971	Kirkcaldy	-	-
1971–1973	Uddingston	-	-
1973–1980	Edinburgh Civil Service	-	-
1980–1985	Grange	-	-
National team
Years	Team	Caps	Goals
1976–1982	Great Britain	19	-
1972–1985	Scotland	89	-
Medal record
Field hockey
Representing Great Britain
Champions Trophy
Bronze medal – third place	1978 Lahore	Team competition

William McLean is a former British and Scottish hockey international. He was selected for the 1980 Summer Olympics.

== Biography ==
McLean was educated at Kirkcaldy High School and played club hockey for Kirkcaldy. In August 1971 was selected for the Scottish national team pool.

He spent two years at Uddingston before joining Edinburgh Civil Service, where he would go on to win the Scottish title five times (1975–76, 1976–77, 1977–78, 1978–79 and 1979–80).

He made his Great Britain debut on 13 March 1976. McLean was part of the bronze-medal winning Great Britain team that competed at the inaugural 1978 Men's Hockey Champions Trophy, in Lahore, Pakistan.

McLean went to his second Champions Trophy in 1980 and was selected for the Great Britain team for the 1980 Olympic Games in Moscow, but subsequently did not attend due to the boycott.

After the Olympics he joined Grange and captained the Scotland and Great Britain teams. After missing out on a 1984 Summer Olympics place he retired from playing in 1985.
