= Huw Jones (field hockey) =

Welsh field hockey player

Personal information
- Born: 15 September 1980 (age 45) Nairobi, Kenya

Sport
- Sport: Field hockey
- Position: Midfield
Senior career
Years	Team	Caps	Goals
1998–1999	Sourport	-	-
1999–2002	Teddington	-	-
2003–2006	Hampstead & Westminster	-	-
2007–2013	Reading	-	-
2013–2014	Oxted	-	-
National team
Years	Team	Caps	Goals
2002–2014	Wales		-

Huw Jones (born 15 September 1980) is a former field hockey player who represented Wales. He competed for Wales at the 2002 Commonwealth Games and the 2014 Commonwealth Games. His brother is Zak Jones.

== Biography ==
Jones, born in Nairobi, played club hockey for Stourport Hockey Club in the Men's England Hockey League before joining Teddington Hockey Club in September 1999. While at Teddington, he represented Wales at the 2002 Commonwealth Games in Manchester.

He moved from Teddington to Hampstead & Westminster Hockey Club and then signed for Reading Hockey Club and played for them for five years before joining Oxted Hockey Club for the 2013–14 season.

While at Oxted in 2014, he was selected to represent the Welsh team at the 2014 Commonwealth Games in Glasgow, Scotland in the men's tournament.
