= Jonny Gooch =

Welsh field hockey player

Personal information
- Born: 3 January 1994 (age 32)

Sport
- Sport: Field hockey
- Position: Defender
Senior career
Years	Team	Caps	Goals
2013–2016	Birmingham Univ	-	-
2016–2017	Reading	-	-
2017–2023	Hampstead & Westminster	-	-
National team
Years	Team	Caps	Goals
2016–2022	Wales		-

Jonathan Gooch (born 3 January 1994) is a Welsh field hockey player who has represented Wales. He competed for Wales at the 2018 Commonwealth Games.

== Biography ==
Gooch studied Geography at University of Birmingham . He played club hockey for University of Birmingham Hockey Club in the Men's England Hockey League and made his Welsh debut against France in April 2016.

After Birmingham he studied Real Estate at the University of Reading and played for Reading Hockey Club. In 2017, he moved to London for work and subsequently joined Hampstead & Westminster Hockey Club.

In 2018 he was selected to represent the Welsh team at the 2018 Commonwealth Games in Gold Coast, Australia. He also represented Wales at the 2019 Men's EuroHockey Championship.

In July 2022 he announced his retirement from international hockey.
