= Donny Hay =

Scottish field hockey player

Personal information
- Born: 1959
- Died: 29/08/2026

Sport
- Sport: Field hockey
- Position: Forward
Senior career
Years	Team	Caps	Goals
1980–1994	Grange	-	-
National team
Years	Team	Caps	Goals
–	Scotland	51	-

Donny Hay (born 1959) was a former field hockey player who played for the Scotland men's national field hockey team gaining 51 caps as a forward during the 1980s. Hay also played for the Scotland indoor hockey team.

== Biography ==
He played club hockey for Grange in the Scottish Hockey National Leagues and indoors for Plexus Mercian.

While at Grange, Hay was called up to the Scottish training squad in April 1980.

Hay played in Scotland's first ever outdoor victory against Spain in 1983. Scotland won the match 1–0 in Barcelona.

Hay was part of the Grange squad that played in the 1995 European Cup Winners' Cup tournament in Sardinia. Grange losing to Real Club de Polo de Barcelona (ESP) 3–1, Harvestehuder THC (GER) 3–0, SKA Ekaterinburg (RUS) 3-1 and beating MZKS Poczotwiec (POL) 3–1 to finish sixth overall.

In 2003 he was in the Scotland squad that played in the Home Countries Veterans' Tournament held in Edinburgh.
