= Ed Greaves =

Scottish field hockey player

Personal information
- Born: 15 April 1995 (age 31) Balloch, West Dunbartonshire, Scotland

Sport
- Sport: Field hockey
- Position: Midfielder
Senior career
Years	Team	Caps	Goals
2014–2019	Loughborough Students'	-	-
2019–2023	Teddington	-	-
National team
Years	Team	Caps	Goals
2017–2023	Scotland	63	-
Medal record
Representing Scotland
European Championship II
Silver medal – second place	2021 Gniezno	Team

Ed Greaves (born 15 April 1995) is a Scottish field hockey player who represented the Scottish national team at the 2022 Commonwealth Games.

== Biography ==
Greaves was born in Balloch, West Dunbartonshire and educated at Jamestown Primary School and Lomond School. He studied Sports Technology at Loughborough University While at Loughborough, he played club hockey for Loughborough Students' Hockey Club in the Men's England Hockey League.

After university he signed for Teddington Hockey Club for the 2019–20 season and played for Scotland at the 2019 Men's EuroHockey Championship. In 2021, he helped Scotland win the silver medal at the 2021 Men's EuroHockey Championship II in Gniezno, Poland.

In 2022 he was selected to represent Scotland at the 2022 Commonwealth Games in Birmingham, England, in the men's tournament.

In 2023, he left Teddington to pursue a career in Vietnam.
