= Teddington Hockey Club =

English field hockey team

- Full name: Teddington Hockey Club
- League: Men's England Hockey League; Women's South League
- Founded: 1871; 155 years ago
- Colors: Pink
- Home ground: Teddington School
- Website: www.teddingtonhockey.club
Home

Teddington Hockey Club is a field hockey club based at Teddington School, Teddington in the London Borough of Richmond upon Thames. The club is one of the oldest in the world after being formed in 1871; the club advertise that they are the oldest in the world but the claim is disputed by the Blackheath Hockey Club.

== Teams ==
Teddington runs a large number of teams including eight men's team and seven women's teams. The men's first X1 play in the Men's England Hockey League Division One South.

== History ==
The men's team have been champions of England on one occasion (1994–95).

In March 2006, a new £125,000 clubhouse in Broom Road was opened by former players Jason Laslett and Jon Potter.

== National honours ==
The club has gained significant honours:

- 1994-95 National League Champions
- 1996-97 National League Runner-up
- 1993-94 Cup winners
- 1996-97 Cup winners

== Notable players ==
=== Men's internationals ===
Extended content

| Player | Events | Notes/ref |
|---|---|---|
| (Scotland) Murray Collins | CG (2022) | |
| (England) Matt Daly | Oly (2008, 2012) | |
| (England) Brett Garrard | Oly (2000, 2004) CG (1998), WC (1998) | |
| (England) Calum Giles | Oly (1996, 2000) | |
| (Scotland) Ed Greaves | | |
| (Malaysia) Chua Boon Huat | 2005 | |
| (England) Danny Haydon | CT (2001) | |
| (Wales) Huw Jones | CG (2002) | |
| (Wales) David Kettle | CG (2018) | |
| (England) Jason Laslett | Oly (1992, 1996), WC (1994) | |
| (Scotland) Robin Lindsay | Oly (1948) | |
| (England) Phil McGuire | Oly (1996), WC (1994) | |
| (England) Rob Moore | Oly (2004, 2012) | |
| (England) Simon Nicklin | Oly (1992), WC (1994), CT (1993) | |
| (Scotland) Robbie Shepherdson | CG (2022) | |
| (England) Jimmy Wallis | Oly (2000), CG (1998), WC (1998) | |
| (England) Ali Wilson | Oly (2008, 2012) | |
| (England) Mark Woodbridge | WC (1973) | |
| (South Africa) Luke Wynford | WC (2023) | |

Key

- Oly = Olympic Games
- CG = Commonwealth Games
- WC = World Cup
- CT = Champions Trophy
- EC = European Championships

=== Women's internationals ===
Extended content

| Player | Events | Notes/ref |
|---|---|---|
| (Australia) Michelle Mitchell | Oly (1996), CG (1998) | |
| (South Africa) Kayla de Waal | Oly (2024), WC (2022) | |

Key

- Oly = Olympic Games
- CG = Commonwealth Games
- WC = World Cup
- CT = Champions Trophy
- EC = European Championships
