= Hardeep Jawanda =

English field hockey player

Hardeep ("Harry") Jawanda (born in Wolverhampton, West Midlands) is an English international hockey player who plays as a Midfielder/forward.

He joined Wolverhampton Hockey club, where he scored over 600 goals in his 5 seasons there. He then left Wolverhampton to join Cannock Hockey Club. With Cannock he won 5 National Titles and 2 European titles.

He then moved to Reading Hockey Club in the 2009/2010 transfer window due to work commitments.
