= Lee Morton =

Scottish field hockey player (born 1995)

Personal information
- Born: 23 May 1995 (age 31) Glasgow, Scotland
- Height: 1.8 m (5 ft 11 in)
- Weight: 71.5 kg (158 lb)

Sport
- Sport: Field hockey
- Position: Midfielder / Forward
Youth career
- Team
- –: Kelburne
Senior career
Years	Team	Caps	Goals
–2017	Kelburne	-	-
2017–2019	Reading	-	-
2019–2024	Old Georgians	-	-
2024–2025	Amsterdam	-	-
National team
Years	Team	Caps	Goals
2014–2025	Scotland	91	(15)
2018–2024	Great Britain	44	(7)
Medal record
Representing Scotland
European Championship II
Gold medal – first place	2017 Glasgow	Team
Silver medal – second place	2021 Gniezno	Team

Lee Morton (born 23 May 1995) is a Scottish field hockey player who plays as a midfielder or forward for Dutch Hoofdklasse club Amsterdam and the Scotland and Great Britain national team. He competed at the 2024 Summer Olympics.

== Biography ==
Morton, born in Glasgow, Scotland, began his career at his childhood side Kelburne, based in Paisley, where Morton originates from. He amassed a total of seven league titles, 5 Scottish cups and a bronze medal at the EuroHockey Club Challenge I held in Glasgow, Scotland before moving south of the border.

Morton won a gold medal with Scotland at the 2017 Men's EuroHockey Championship II in Glasgow. Also in 2017, Morton joined Reading in the Men's England Hockey League Premier Division and success followed him down south with a two league titles, an English Cup and three indoor titles. While at Reading, he represented Scotland at the 2018 Commonwealth Games and was selected in the Scotland squad for the 2019 EuroHockey Championship. He made his Great Britain debut on 16 June 2018.

Morton transferred from Reading to Old Georgians for the 2019–20 season. He was selected to represent Scotland at the 2022 Commonwealth Games in Birmingham and helped Old Georgians win two league and cup doubles during the 2021–22 season and 2022-23 season and the league title during the 2023-24 season.

Morton was selected to represent Great Britain at the 2024 Summer Olympics. During the group stage, he scored a late equaliser from a penalty against the Netherlands, to level the game 2-2. The team were eliminated in the quarter-finals after losing a penalty shootout to India.

In 2024 he left the British leagues to play for Dutch Hoofdklasse club Amsterdam.
