= Rob Harwood =

Scottish field hockey player

Personal information
- Born: 15 July 1997 (age 29) Milngavie, Glasgow, Scotland

Sport
- Sport: Field hockey
- Position: Forward
Senior career
Years	Team	Caps	Goals
2015–2025	Western Wildcats	-	-
National team
Years	Team	Caps	Goals
–	Scotland	55	(13)
Medal record
Representing Scotland
European Championship II
Silver medal – second place	2021 Gniezno	Team
Bronze medal – third place	2025 Lousada	Team

Rob Harwood (born 15 July 1997) is a Scottish field hockey player who has represented Scotland at two Commonwealth Games.

== Biography ==
Harwood was born in Milngavie, Glasgow and attended Milngavie Primary and Douglas Academy. He studied Psychology at the University of Strathclyde (2015 to 2020) and Psychology of Sport at the University of Stirling (2020 to 2022).

Harwood played club hockey for Western Wildcats Hockey Club in the Scottish Hockey Premiership and was captain in 2015. While at Western, he attended his first Commonwealth Games hockey tournament at the 2018 Commonwealth Games in Gold Coast, Australia. He made another appearance at the Commonwealth Games in 2022, representing Scotland at the Commonwealth Games in Birmingham.

In 2021, he helped Scotland win the silver medal at the 2021 Men's EuroHockey Championship II in Gniezno, Poland and since 2022 he has been the Head of U.S Sports Scholarships based in Glasgow.

In 2025, he helped Scotland win another bronze medal at the 2025 Men's EuroHockey Championship II in Lousada, Portugal, defeating Italy in the third place play off.
