= Maximilien Branicki =

French field hockey player

Personal information
- Born: 16 December 1997 (age 28)
- Height: 180 cm (5 ft 11 in)
- Weight: 74 kg (163 lb)

Sport
- Sport: Field hockey
- Position: Forward
- Club: Royal Orée
National team
Years	Team	Caps	Goals
2015	Belgium U–18	5	(0)
2018–	France	46	(10)
Medal record
Men's field hockey
Representing France
FIH Hockey Series
Gold medal – first place	2018–19 Le Touquet	Team

Maximilien Branicki (born 16 December 1997) is a Belgian–French field hockey player.

== Personal life ==
Maximilien Branicki has a younger brother, Stanislas, who also plays international hockey for France.

== Career ==
=== Club level ===
In club competition, Branicki plays for Royal Orée in the Belgian Hockey League.

=== Belgium ===
Maximilien Branicki made his international debut at Under–18 level. He represented Belgium at the 2015 EuroHockey Youth Championship in Santander.

=== France ===
After competing at a junior level for Belgium, Branicki made the switch to his home country, France, in 2018. He made his debut for Les Bleus during a test series against Belgium in Brussels. Later that year he competed at the FIH World Cup in Bhubaneswar.

In 2019 he won his first medal with the French team, winning gold at the 2018–19 FIH Series Finals in Le Touquet.

Branicki was named in the French squad for the season three of the FIH Pro League.
