= Austin Savage (field hockey) =

British field hockey player

Personal information
- Born: 15 December 1940 St Asaph, Wales
- Died: 1 May 2024 (aged 84) Wales

Sport
- Sport: Field hockey
- Position: Goalkeeper
Senior career
Years	Team	Caps	Goals
1963–1977	Oxton	-	-
1977–1989	Hightown	-	-
National team
Years	Team	Caps	Goals
1962–1981	Wales		-
1966–	Great Britain		-

David Austin Savage (15 December 1940 – 1 May 2024) was a Welsh field hockey player who competed for Great Britain at the 1972 Summer Olympics.

== Biography ==
Savage was raised in Trelogan, Flintshire in Wales and studied biology at Bangor University where he started playing hockey.

Savage played as a goalkeeper and made his Welsh debut against England in 1962 and Great Britain debut in 1966. He was a member of the Oxton Hockey Club. While at Oxton he represented Great Britain at the 1972 Olympic Games in Munich in the men's tournament.

He represented Cheshire at county level and left Oxton to play for Hightown Hockey Club.

After hockey he continued his job as a biology teacher and was a regular contributor for BBC Wales.
