= John McKee (field hockey) =

Irish field hockey player (born 1996)

Personal information
- Born: 22 December 1996 (age 29) Banbridge, Northern Ireland

Sport
- Sport: Field hockey
- Position: Forward
Senior career
Years	Team	Caps	Goals
–	Banbridge	-	-
National team
Years	Team	Caps	Goals
2014	Ireland U–21	8	(6)
2015–	Ireland	88	(42)
Medal record
Men's field hockey
Representing Ireland
FIH Nations Cup
Silver medal – second place	2022 Potchefstroom	Team
EuroHockey Championship II
Gold medal – first place	2023 Dublin	Team
Bronze medal – third place	2021 Gniezno	Team

John McKee (born 22 December 1996) is a field hockey player from Ireland, who plays as a forward.

== Life ==
McKee was born on 22 December 1996.

His younger sister, Katie, also plays international field hockey for Ireland.

== Field hockey ==
=== Domestic league ===
McKee currently competes in the Irish Hockey League, where he represents Banbridge.

=== Under–21 ===
He made his debut for the Irish U–21 team in 2014 during a four-nations tournament in Belfast. He then went on to represent the team at the EuroHockey Junior Championship II in Lousada.

=== Senior national team ===
McKee made his senior international debut in 2015. He appeared in a test series against Argentina in Dublin.

Since his debut, McKee has been present at numerous international events and has medalled with the national team on three occasions. He took home gold at the 2023 EuroHockey Championship II in Dublin, silver at the 2022 FIH Nations Cup in Potchefstroom, and bronze at the 2021 EuroHockey Championship II in Gniezno.

He competed at the 2024 FIH Olympic Qualifiers in Valencia.
