= Moritz Rothländer =

German field hockey player

Personal information
- Born: 10 November 1997 (age 28) Germany

Sport
- Sport: Field hockey
- Position: Midfield
- Club: TSV Mannheim
National team
Years	Team	Caps	Goals
2015–2018	Germany U–21	30	(10)
2016–	Germany	19	(4)
Medal record
Men's field hockey
Representing Germany
FIH Champions Trophy
Bronze medal – third place	2016 London
EuroHockey Junior Championship
Bronze medal – third place	2017 Valencia

Moritz Rothländer (born 10 November 1997) is a German field hockey player.

== Career ==
=== Club level ===
In club competition, Rothländer plays for TSV Mannheim in the German Bundesliga.

=== Junior national team ===
Moritz Rothländer made his debut for the German U–21 team in 2016. His first appearance was during a test series against England in Bisham.

In 2017, he won a bronze medal with the junior team at the EuroHockey Junior Championship in Valencia.

=== Die Honamas ===
Rothländer made his debut for Die Honamas in 2016, winning bronze at the FIH Champions Trophy in London.

In 2019, following a string of appearances in test matches, Rothländer gained a more permanent role in the national squad and went on to compete in the first season of the FIH Pro League.

Following the retirements of senior players following the 2020 Summer Olympics, Rothländer was officially added to the national squad.
