= Duncan Riddell =

Scottish field hockey player

Personal information
- Born: 26 September 1993 (age 32) Edinburgh, Scotland
- Weight: 72 kg (159 lb)

Sport
- Sport: Field hockey
- Position: Midfielder
Senior career
Years	Team	Caps	Goals
–2018	Grange	-	-
2018–2019	Reading	-	-
2019-2025	Grange	-	-
National team
Years	Team	Caps	Goals
2016–2025	Scotland	73	(5)
Medal record
Representing Scotland
European Championship II
Gold medal – first place	2017 Glasgow	Team

Duncan MacLeod Riddell (born 26 September 1993) is an international field hockey player who played as a midfielder for Scotland.

== Biography ==
Riddell won a gold medal with Scotland at the 2017 Men's EuroHockey Championship II in Glasgow and was selected to represent Scotland at the 2018 Commonwealth Games in Gold Coast.

In August 2019, he was selected in the Scotland squad for the 2019 EuroHockey Championship.

Riddell played club hockey in the Men's England Hockey League for Reading Hockey Club before returning to Grange in 2019 and helped them win the Scottish title. He was selected to represent Scotland at the 2022 Commonwealth Games in Birmingham

Riddell announced his international retirement in April 2025.
