= Grange Hockey Club =

Field hockey club in Edinburgh, Scotland

Grange
- Full name: Grange Men's Hockey Club
- Nickname(s): The Stags
- League: Scottish Hockey National Leagues
- Founded: 1905; 121 years ago
- Home ground: The Grange Club, Portgower Place, Edinburgh

Personnel
- Chairman: Jonathan Baird
- Website: Official website
Home	Away

Grange Hockey Club is one of four sections of The Grange Club situated at Portgower Place in Edinburgh. The three other sports that can be enjoyed through the parent club are Cricket, Squash and Tennis. The Grange home kit is white shirts with blue shorts and blue socks and training for men at all skill levels takes place every Tuesday at St George's Girls School.

== History ==
Grange Hockey Club, originally Edinburgh Northern Hockey Club, was formed in April 1905 and was one of the early hockey clubs in Scotland. The club first started playing at Raeburn Place in 1928 and changed its name to Grange Hockey Club in 1972.

The ladies' section began life in 1919 as Edinburgh Western and then changed its name to Edinburgh Western Wanders in 1946, followed by another name change to Grange Western Wanderers in 1976. The latter won National League 2 in 1984 and 1993. They finally became Grange Ladies in 1999.

The men's first team became champions of Scotland after winning the National League 1 in 1983 and further wins came in 1995, 1996, 2002, 2018 and 2019. The top tier was renamed the Premiership in 2020 and Grange won three more titles in 2020, 2023 and 2024.

== Teams ==
With eight men's teams, four ladies teams, veterans and active youth section the Grange Hockey Club is one of the largest in Scotland.

=== Men ===
The 1st XI is one of the sides in the country and regularly supplies players to the Scotland national side.

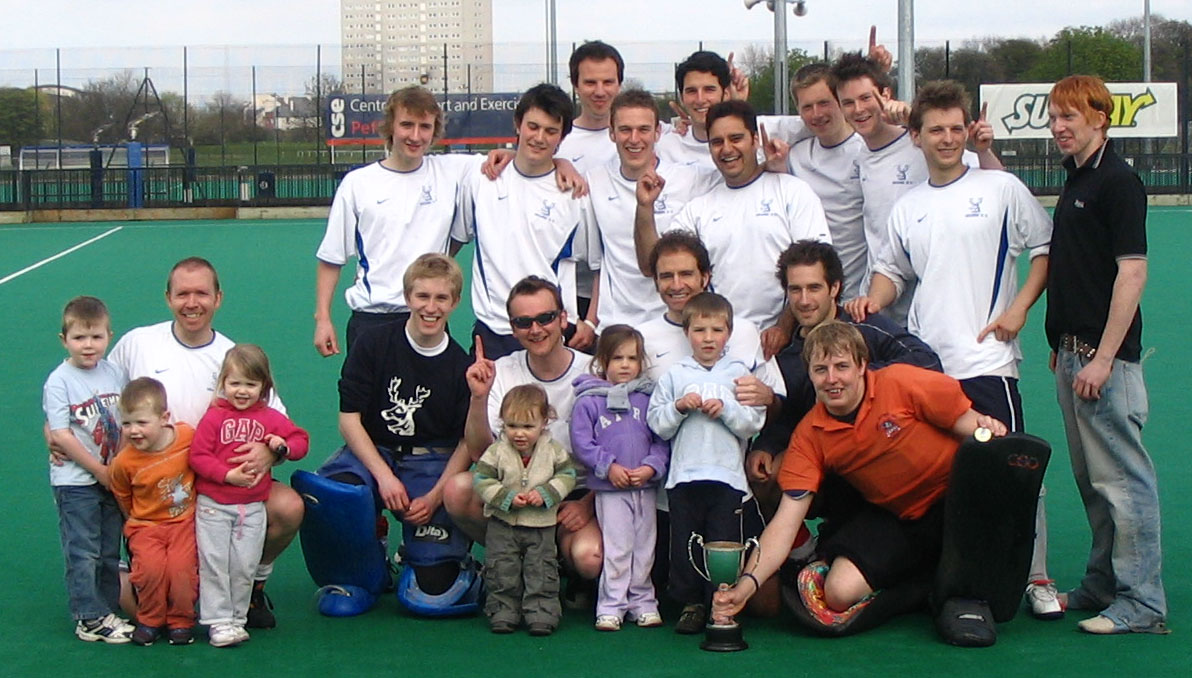
Grange 2nd XI

Grange 3rd XI

Grange 2nd XI and 3rd XI's are in Regional Central League 1, the highest division in which a club 2nd XI are permitted to play by the sport’s governing body. Grange's 5th team (the development team) were established to allow younger players the opportunity to become involved in men's senior hockey under the guidance of a host of more experienced, high calibre and ex-international players. Grange Development team have been a permanent fixture of East District League 1 for a number of years. Grange 6th to 8th XIs play in East District Leagues 1, 2 and 4 respectively, acting as a development base for new or inexperienced players, and providing an opportunity for those that seek more enjoyment than competitive edge from their hockey.

In addition, Grange Hockey Club has an Youth section Under 18 membership of some 160 youngsters between the ages of nine and fifteen, both boys and girls, fielding teams at U18, U16, U14 and U12. Grange Under 16 teams compete in National Leagues while the Under 14 teams take part in a local League for that age group. In recent years Grange have had representatives in the Scotland Boys Under 18 and Scotland Boys and Girls Under 16 Squads, in addition to several representatives in District Squads at both age groups.

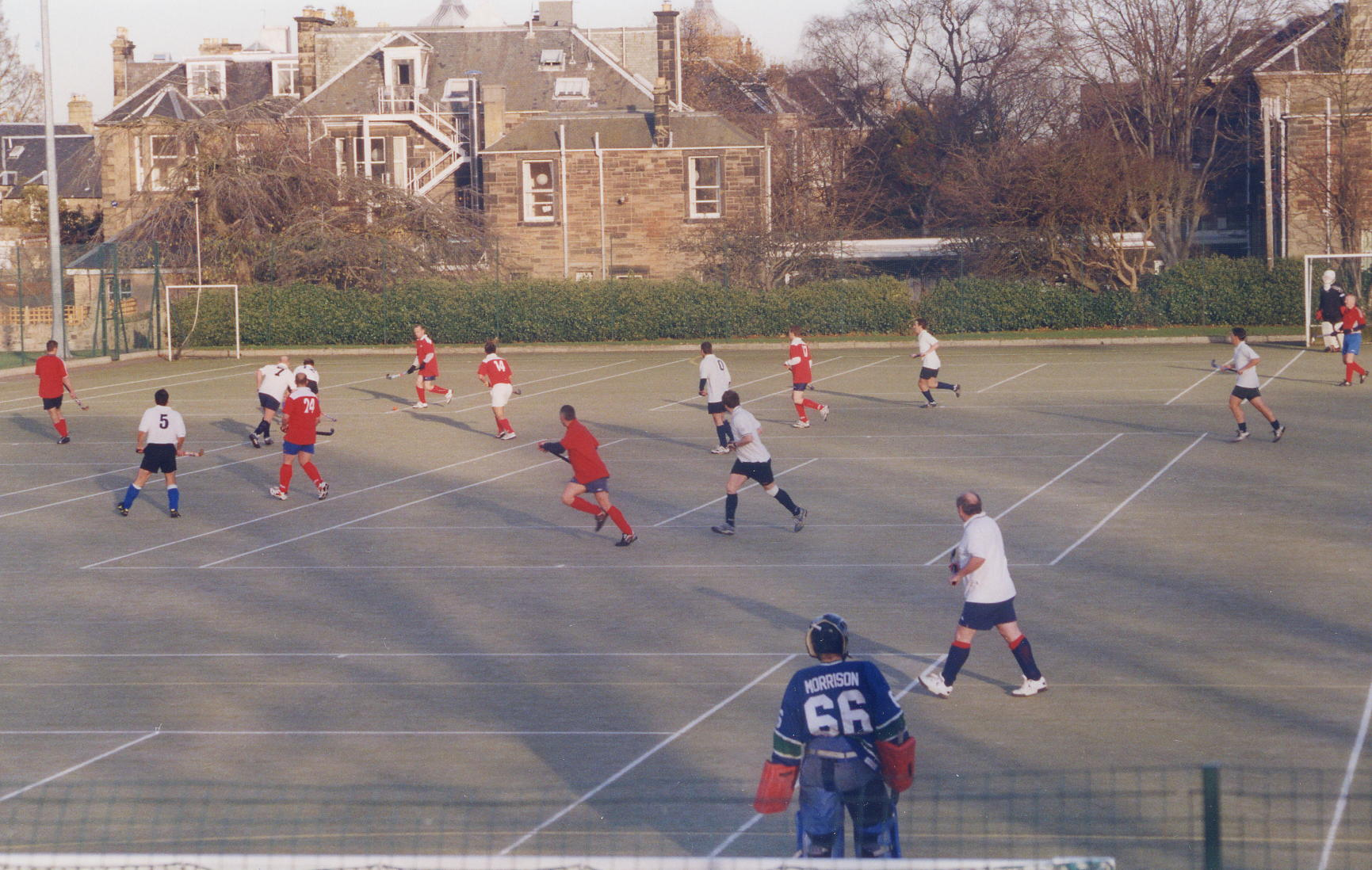
Training takes place at St George's School

=== Women ===
There are four teams and indoor teams.

== Honours ==
- Scottish champions:
- 1982-1983
- 1994-1995
- 1995-1996
- 2001-2002
- 2017-2018
- 2018-2019
- 2019-2020
- 2022-2023
- 2023-2024

Men's EuroHockey Club Trophy

2018

== Notable players ==
=== Men's internationals ===
Extended content

Player	Events/Notes	Ref
(Scotland) Robert Barr		
(Scotland) Dan Coultas	2017–2020	
(Scotland) Dave Forrester	CG (2022), EC (2021, 2023)	
(Scotland) Cameron Fraser	CG (2010, 2018)	
(Scotland) Jamie Green	EC (2025)	
(Scotland) Donny Hay	1980–1995	
(Scotland) Michael Leonard	CG (2006)	
(Scotland) Callum Mackenzie	2017–2019	
(Scotland) Alistair McGregor	2001–2002	
(Scotland) Billy McLean	1980–1984	
(Scotland) David Nairn	EC (2025)	
(Scotland) Duncan Riddell	CG (2022)	
(Republic of Ireland) Michael Watt	2005–2009	

Key

- Oly = Olympic Games
- CG = Commonwealth Games
- WC = World Cup
- CT = Champions Trophy
- EC = European Championships
