= Clifton Robinsons Hockey Club =

English field hockey club

- League: Men's England Hockey League; Women's England Hockey League
- Home ground: Coombe Dingle Sports Centre
- Website: http://www.cliftonrobinsonshockey.co.uk/
Home	Away

Clifton Robinsons Hockey Club is a field hockey club based at Westbury-on-Trym in Bristol. It was formed by the merging of Clifton Ladies Hockey Club and Robinsons Hockey Club. The clubs had shared close links for many years, sharing pitches, umpires, coaches and annual dinners and in summer 2016 joined to form a single club.

The Ladies' 1st XI play in the Women's England Hockey League and the Men's 1st XI play in the Men's England Hockey League. The club fields six ladies' and seven men's league sides and as well as junior and masters teams.

As Clifton Ladies, the club has won the Women's Cup on four occasions (1998, 2000, 2016 and 2019) and was runner-up in 1996, 1997, 2005, 2013 and 2015. They also finished runner-up in the 1997-98 Women's National League.

== Teams ==
=== Ladies First Team Squad 2025–26 season ===
- 1. Nicole Pollastrone (goalkeeper)
- 3. Livvy Lane
- 4. Lily Webb
- 6. Ella Cusack
- 8. Ashley Mainwaring (captain)
- 10. Victoria McCabe
- 11. Sara Davies
- 15. Jade Vardon-Cardy
- 16. Eloise Moat
- 20. Darcy Shields
- x. Emilia Puddicombe
- x. Isabel Hinde-Smith
- x. Evie Grindal
- x. Lilly Holmes

== Major National Honours ==
National League

- 1997–98 Women's League Runner-Up

National Cup

- 1995–96 Women's National Cup Runner-Up
- 1996–97 Women's National Cup Runner-Up
- 1997–98 Women's National Cup Winners
- 1999–00 Women's National Cup Winners
- 2004–05 Women's National Cup Runner-Up
- 2012–13 Women's National Cup Runner-Up
- 2014–15 Women's National Cup Runner-Up
- 2015–16 Women's National Cup Winners
- 2018-19 Women's National Cup Winners
- 2019–20 Women's Cup Runner-Up

National Tournaments

- 1998–99 Women's Premiership Tournament Runner-Up

== Notable players ==
=== Women's internationals ===
- (England) Sophie Hamilton
- (Wales) Ellie Laity
- (England) Kathryn Lane
- (England) Georgie Twigg
- (England) Holly Munro
- (Wales) Phoebe Richards
- (Wales) Izzy Webb

=== Men’s internationals ===
- (Scotland) Tim Atkins
- (Republic of Ireland) Stuart Loughrey

== Past squads ==
Extended content

Ladies First Team Squad 2020–21 season Note: Flags indicate national team as defined under FIFA eligibility rules; some limited exceptions apply. Players may hold more than one non-FIFA nationality.

No.	Pos.	Nation	Player
1	GK	NED	Aline De Visser
2	DF	ENG	Holly Munro
3	DF	ENG	Kathryn Lane
4		ENG	Flora Fletcher
5	MF	ENG	Maria Jones
6	MF	ENG	Holly Savage
7	MF	WAL	Ellie Laity
8	MF	ENG	Ashley Mainwaring
9	FW	WAL	Phoebe Richards
10	FW	IRL	Catherine Macaulay
11	FW	WAL	Natasha Marke-Jones
12	FW	ENG	Claire Thomas (captain)
13	MF	ENG	Kitty Chapple
14	MF	WAL	Izzy Webb
15	FW	ENG	Meg Crowson
16	MF	ENG	Carmen Ansley
17		ENG	Abi Porter
25	FW	WAL	Sarah-Jayne Thorburn
44	FW	ENG	Sophie Hamilton
