= Chris Newman (field hockey) =

English field hockey player

Personal information
- Born: 17 September 1990 (age 35)

Sport
- Sport: Field hockey
Senior career
Years	Team	Caps	Goals
2015–2016	Reading	-	-

Christopher Mark Newman is an English field hockey player and Indoor field hockey International.

== Education ==
Newman was educated at Abingdon School and was captain of the first eleven.

== Hockey career ==
He joined Reading Hockey Club and was made the club captain in 2014. An international call up arrived in 2014 when he was selected as part of the team that took part in the EuroHockey Indoor Nations Championship in Vienna, Austria. He represented England again in the 2016 EuroHockey Indoor Nations Championship II in Espinho, Portugal assisting England to a third-place finish.

== See also ==
- List of Old Abingdonians
