= 2021 Men's EuroHockey Championship II =

Field hockey tournament

Tournament details
- Host country: Poland
- City: Gniezno
- Dates: 15–21 August
- Teams: 8 (from 1 confederation)
- Venue: Alfonsa Flinika Hockey Stadium

Final positions
- Champions: Austria (1st title)
- Runner-up: Scotland
- Third place: Ireland

Tournament statistics
- Matches played: 20
- Goals scored: 82 (4.1 per match)
- Top scorer: (Scotland) Alan Forsyth (7 goals)

The 2021 Men's EuroHockey Championship II was the ninth edition of the Men's EuroHockey Championship II, the second level of the men's European field hockey championships organized by the European Hockey Federation. It was held from 15 to 21 August 2021 in Gniezno, Poland.

The top five teams qualified for the European qualifier for the 2023 Men's FIH Hockey World Cup.

Austria won their first EuroHockey Championship II title by defeating Scotland 7–6 in the penalty shoot-out following a 1–1 draw in regular time. Ireland won the bronze medal by defeating the hosts Poland 4–2.

== Qualified teams ==
Participating nations have qualified based on their final ranking from the 2019 competition.

Dates	Event	Location	Quotas	Qualifiers
16–25 August 2019	2019 EuroHockey Championship	Antwerp, Belgium	2	Ireland (13); Scotland (19)
28 July – 3 August 2019	2019 EuroHockey Championship II	Cambrai, France	4	Austria (20); Italy (23); Poland (26); Ukraine (29)
28 July – 3 August 2019	2019 EuroHockey Championship III	Gibraltar	2	Croatia (39); Switzerland (34)
Total			8	

== Umpires ==
The following 10 umpires were appointed for the tournament by the EHF:

- Antonio Ilgrande (ITA)
- Ivan Grgurev (CRO)
- Tim Meissner (GER)
- Greig Cunningham (SCO)
- Lukas Orzeł (POL)
- Maksym Perepelytsya (UKR)
- Ian Strange (IRL)
- Friedrich Weiland (AUT)
- Benjamin Messerli (SUI)
- Lukasz Zwierzchowski (POL)

== Preliminary round ==
=== Pool A ===
Pos	Team	Pld	W	D	L	GF	GA	GD	Pts	Qualification
1	Ireland	3	2	1	0	9	2	+7	7	Semi-finals and 2023 World Cup qualifier
2	Poland (H)	3	2	0	1	7	4	+3	6	Semi-finals and 2023 World Cup qualifier
3	Italy	3	1	1	1	5	4	+1	4	
4	Croatia	3	0	0	3	3	14	−11	0	

Source: FIH
Rules for classification: 1) points; 2) matches won; 3) goal difference; 4) goals for; 5) head-to-head result; 6) field goals for.
(H) Hosts

15 August 2021
17:45

Italy	4–1	Croatia
M. Mondo 30'; Amorosini 51'; Blom 54'; Nunez 59'	Report	Mucić 7'

Umpires:
Friedrich Weiland (AUT)
Benjamin Messerli (SUI)

15 August 2021
20:10

Ireland	2–1	Poland
Walker 15'; McKee 60'	Report	Sudoł 41'

Umpires:
Tim Meissner (GER)
Maksym Perepelytsya (UKR)

17 August 2021
17:45

Italy	1–1	Ireland
Sior 13'	Report	O'Donoghue 7'

Umpires:
Tim Meissner (GER)
Friedrich Weiland (AUT)

17 August 2021
20:00

Poland	4–2	Croatia
R. Pawlak 30'; Gumny 35'; Jarzyński 55'; Rutkowski 57'	Report	Mucić 6', 8'

Umpires:
Benjamin Messerli (SUI)
Ian Strange (IRL)

18 August 2021
17:45

Ireland	6–0	Croatia
Murray 4'; O'Donoghue 29', 52'; Duncan 31'; McKee 40', 52'	Report

Umpires:
Greig Cunningham (SCO)
Friedrich Weiland (AUT)

18 August 2021
20:00

Poland	2–0	Italy
Głowacki 13'; Jarzyński 30'	Report

Umpires:
Tim Meissner (GER)
Benjamin Messerli (SUI)

=== Pool B ===
Pos	Team	Pld	W	D	L	GF	GA	GD	Pts	Qualification
1	Austria	3	2	0	1	4	4	0	6	Semi-finals and 2023 World Cup qualifier
2	Scotland	3	1	1	1	11	6	+5	4	Semi-finals and 2023 World Cup qualifier
3	Ukraine	3	1	1	1	10	7	+3	4	
4	Switzerland	3	1	0	2	3	11	−8	3	

Source: FIH
Rules for classification: 1) points; 2) matches won; 3) goal difference; 4) goals for; 5) head-to-head result; 6) field goals for.

15 August 2021
13:15

Austria	0–2	Switzerland
	Report	Grandchamp 48'; Stomps 58'

Umpires:
Antonio Ilgrande (ITA)
Lukasz Orzeł (POL)

15 August 2021
15:30

Scotland	4–4	Ukraine
McConnell 12'; Forsyth 13'; Harwood 15'; Golden 56'	Report	Kalinchuk 34'; Solomianyi 39'; Paziuk 57'; Kovalenko 58'

Umpires:
Ivan Grgurev (CRO)
Ian Strange (IRL)

16 August 2021
17:15

Ukraine	5–1	Switzerland
Koshelenko 17'; Solomianyi 21'; Popov 38'; Onofriiuk 54'; Kalinchuk 55'	Report	Hengartner 39'

Umpires:
Greig Cunningham (SCO)
Lukasz Orzeł (POL)

16 August 2021
19:30

Austria	2–1	Scotland
Uher 4'; Kölbl 24'	Report	Walker 52'

Umpires:
Tim Meissner (GER)
Antonio Ilgrande (ITA)

18 August 2021
13:15

Scotland	6–0	Switzerland
Field 10'; Forsyth 12', 38', 45'; Shepherdson 41'; Walker 53'	Report

Umpires:
Lukasz Zwierzchowski (POL)
Ian Strange (IRL)

18 August 2021
15:30

Ukraine	1–2	Austria
Onofriiuk 19'	Report	Uher 39', 60'

Umpires:
Antonio Ilgrande (ITA)
Ivan Grgurev (CRO)

== Fifth to eighth place classification ==
=== Pool C ===
The points obtained in the preliminary round against the other team are taken over.

Pos	Team	Pld	W	D	L	GF	GA	GD	Pts	Qualification
5	Italy	3	2	1	0	7	3	+4	7	2023 World Cup qualifier
6	Ukraine	3	2	0	1	10	5	+5	6	
7	Switzerland	3	1	1	1	7	7	0	4	
8	Croatia	3	0	0	3	4	13	−9	0	

Source: FIH
Rules for classification: 1) points; 2) matches won; 3) goal difference; 4) goals for; 5) head-to-head result; 6) field goals for.

20 August 2021
10:15

Croatia	0–4	Switzerland
	Report	G. Wyss-Chodat 13'; B. Wyss-Chodat 15'; Stomps 23', 58'

Umpires:
Friedrich Weiland (AUT)
Ian Strange (IRL)

20 August 2021
12:30

Italy	1–0	Ukraine
Amorosini 52'	Report

Umpires:
Lukasz Zwierzchowski (POL)
Tim Meissner (GER)

21 August 2021
09:00

Italy	2–2	Switzerland
Nunez 19'; Keenan 20'	Report	Flück 20'; M. Wyss-Chodat 52'

Umpires:
Tim Meissner (GER)
Friedrich Weiland (AUT)

21 August 2021
11:15

Ukraine	5–3	Croatia
Koshelenko 10', 34'; Kaplinskyi 10'; Kovalenko 46'; Shevchuk 50'	Report	Mucić 28', 32', 39'

Umpires:
Greig Cunningham (SCO)
Ian Strange (IRL)

== First to fourth place classification ==
=== Bracket ===
Semi-finals
20 August
Ireland	2
Scotland	3
20 August
Austria (s.o.)	0 (3)
Poland	0 (2)

Final
21 August
Scotland	1 (6)
Austria (s.o.)	1 (7)
Third place
21 August
Ireland	4
Poland	2

=== Semi-finals ===
20 August 2021
14:45

Ireland	2–3	Scotland
O'Dea 7'; Walker 16'	Report	Forsyth 28', 45', 51'

Umpires:
Antonio Ilgrande (ITA)
Benjamin Messerli (SUI)

20 August 2021
17:00

Austria	0–0	Poland
	Report
Penalties
Unterkircher (penalty shoot-out scored); Thörnblom (penalty shoot-out scored); Uher (penalty shoot-out missed); Losonci (penalty shoot-out missed); Fröhlich (penalty shoot-out scored)	3–2	(penalty shoot-out scored) Kurowski; (penalty shoot-out missed) Jarzyński; (penalty shoot-out scored) R. Pawlak; (penalty shoot-out missed) Chumeńczuk; (penalty shoot-out missed) Bembenek

Umpires:
Greig Cunningham (SCO)
Ivan Grgurev (CRO)

=== Third place game ===
21 August 2021
13:45

Ireland	4–2	Poland
O'Dea 9', 57'; Walker 15'; O'Donoghue 39'	Report	Rutkowski 36'; Kurowski 44'

Umpires:
Antonio Ilgrande (ITA)
Ivan Grgurev (CRO)

=== Final ===
21 August 2021
16:00

Scotland	1–1	Austria
Walker 36'	Report	Uher 52'
Penalties
Forsyth (penalty shoot-out scored); Golden (penalty shoot-out scored); Morton (penalty shoot-out missed); Walker (penalty shoot-out scored); Field (penalty shoot-out scored); Forsyth (penalty shoot-out scored); Golden (penalty shoot-out scored); Morton (penalty shoot-out missed)	6–7	(penalty shoot-out scored) Unterkircher; (penalty shoot-out scored) Thörnblom; (penalty shoot-out missed) Fröhlich; (penalty shoot-out scored) Losonci; (penalty shoot-out scored) Hasun; (penalty shoot-out scored) Unterkircher; (penalty shoot-out scored) Thörnblom; (penalty shoot-out scored) Fröhlich

Umpires:
Benjamin Messerli (SUI)
Tim Meissner (GER)

== Statistics ==
=== Final standings ===
Pos	Team	Qualification
1	Austria	2023 World Cup qualifier
2	Scotland	2023 World Cup qualifier
3	Ireland	2023 World Cup qualifier
4	Poland (H)	2023 World Cup qualifier
5	Italy	2023 World Cup qualifier
6	Ukraine	
7	Switzerland	
8	Croatia	

Source: FIH
(H) Host

=== Goalscorers ===
There were 82 goals scored in 20 matches, for an average of 4.1 goals per match.

7 goals

- (Scotland) Alan Forsyth

6 goals

- (Croatia) Mario Mucić

4 goals

- (Austria) Dominic Uher
- (Ireland) Shane O'Donoghue

3 goals

- (Ireland) John McKee
- (Ireland) Kevin O'Dea
- (Ireland) Ben Walker
- (Scotland) Struan Walker
- (Switzerland) Boris Stomps
- (Ukraine) Andrii Koshelenko

2 goals

- (Italy) Mattia Amorosini
- (Italy) Agustin Nunez
- (Poland) Gragjan Jarzyński
- (Poland) Wojciech Rutkowski
- (Ukraine) Vitalii Kalinchuk
- (Ukraine) Bohdan Kovalenko
- (Ukraine) Maksym Onofriiuk
- (Ukraine) Oleksandr Solomianyi

1 goal

- (Austria) Benjamin Kölbl
- (Ireland) Jeremy Duncan
- (Ireland) Sean Murray
- (Italy) Fabio Blom
- (Italy) Thomas Keenan
- (Italy) Manuel Mondo
- (Italy) Francois Sior
- (Poland) Mikolaj Gumny
- (Poland) Mikołaj Głowacki
- (Poland) Jacek Kurowski
- (Poland) Robert Pawlak
- (Poland) Krystian Sudoł
- (Scotland) Rob Field
- (Scotland) Cameron Golden
- (Scotland) Rob Harwood
- (Scotland) Andy McConnell
- (Scotland) Robbie Shepherdson
- (Switzerland) Jens Flück
- (Switzerland) Loris Grandchamp
- (Switzerland) Lukas Hengartner
- (Switzerland) Benoit Wyss-Chodat
- (Switzerland) Gael Wyss-Chodat
- (Switzerland) Matthieu Wyss-Chodat
- (Ukraine) Volodymyr Kaplinskyi
- (Ukraine) Viacheslav Paziuk
- (Ukraine) Oleksii Popov
- (Ukraine) Vitalii Shevchuk

Source: FIH

== See also ==
- 2021 Men's EuroHockey Championship III
- 2021 Men's EuroHockey Nations Championship
- 2021 Women's EuroHockey Championship II
