= Old Loughtonians Hockey Club =

English hockey club

- League: Men; Men's England Hockey LeagueWomen Women’s England Hockey League https://www.englandhockey.co.uk/teams/old-loughtonians-1-womens
- Founded: 1921; 105 years ago
- Home ground: Roding Sports Centre, Luxborough Lane, Chigwell, Essex

Old Loughtonians Hockey Club is a field hockey club based at the Roding Sports Centre, Luxborough Lane in Chigwell.

== Club ==
The club runs nine men's and six women's teams in addition to junior teams from u7s to u18s. The men's first XI play in the Division 1 South of the Men's England Hockey League. The women's first XI play in Division 1 South of the Women’s England Hockey League https://www.englandhockey.co.uk/teams/old-loughtonians-1-womens.

== History ==
The club was founded in 1921 after the Loughton Hockey Club had disbanded during World War I. The name Old Loughtonians referred to members of the Old Loughtonians, former pupils of Loughton School which opened in 1890. In 1963 the club opened its doors to all-comers following the demise of Old Buckwellians’ Hockey Club. Ladies teams were also created and in 1980 the club opened its new grounds at Luxborough Lane.

In 1986, the Old Loughtonians Hockey Club was the first English hockey club to own an all-weather pitch. A second sand-based pitch was completed in 1992. In 1997 the main pitch was upgraded to a water-base. This was followed by the building of a mini pitch. Old Loughtonians Hockey Club was selected as the hockey and football (5-a-side and 7-a-side) training venue for the London 2012 Olympic and Paralympic Games resulting in the conversion of the two main pitches to international waterbase standard.

== Honours ==
=== Men ===
Outdoor

- 1986-87 National Inter League Championship Runner-Up
- 1993-94 HA Cup Runner-Up
- 1995-96 HA Cup Runner-Up
- 1999-00 EHA Cup Runner-Up
- 2002-03 National League Division 1
- 2016-17 East Premier A Division
- 2021-22 England Hockey Conference East

Indoor

- 1994-95 National Indoor Championships Champions
- 1995-96 National Indoor Championships Champions
- 1999-2000 National Indoor Championships Champions

=== Women ===
Outdoor

- 2004-05 Premier 2 League Champions
- 2025-2026 Conference East Champions

== Notable players ==
=== Men's internationals ===
Extended content

Player	Events/Notes	Ref
(Scotland) David Forrester	2013–2014	
(England) Julian Halls	Olym (1996), WC (1990, 1994)	
(England) Jason Lee	Olym (1996), WC (1998)	
(England) Harry Martin	Oly (2012)	
(England) Nick Thompson	Oly (1996), WC (1990, 1994, 1998)	

Key

- Oly = Olympic Games
- CG = Commonwealth Games
- WC = World Cup
- CT = Champions Trophy
- EC = European Championships
