= Simon Nicklin =

British field hockey player

Personal information
- Born: 23 September 1972 (age 53) Wallingford, Oxfordshire, England
- Height: 172 cm (5 ft 8 in)
- Weight: 71 kg (157 lb)

Sport
- Sport: Field hockey
- Position: Defender
Senior career
Years	Team	Caps	Goals
1991–1993	Slough	-	-
1993	Bath University	-	-
1993–1999	Teddington	-	-
National team
Years	Team	Caps	Goals
–	England & Great Britain	32	-

Simon Roger Nicklin (born 23 September 1972) is a British former field hockey player who competed in the 1992 Summer Olympics.

== Biography ==
Nicklin was born in Wallingford, Oxfordshire, England and educated at Sir William Borlase's Grammar School. While at the school he was selected for the England U21 team.

He played club hockey for Slough in the Men's England Hockey League and at the 1992 Olympic Games in Barcelona, he represented Great Britain.

Nicklin studied at the University of Bath and played games for the university team while also continuing to play for Slough but after the 1992/93 season he signed for Teddington Hockey Club.

While at Teddington, he played for England during the 1994 Men's Hockey World Cup.

He later became a player coach at Spencer Hockey Club and then coached the junior section in 2021.
