= Jason Laslett =

British field hockey player

Personal information
- Born: 1 July 1969 (age 57) Canterbury, England
- Height: 178 cm (5 ft 10 in)
- Weight: 74 kg (163 lb)

Sport
- Sport: Field hockey
Senior career
| Years | Team | Caps | Goals |
| 1985–1988 | Canterbury | - | - |
| 1988–2006 | Teddington | - | - |
National team
| Years | Team | Caps | Goals |
| – | England & Great Britain | | - |
Medal record
Men's field hockey
Representing England
European Championship
| Bronze medal – third place | 1995 Dublin | Team |

Jason George Laslett (born 1 July 1969) is a former international field hockey player who competed at the 1992 Summer Olympics and the 1996 Summer Olympics.

== Biography ==
Laslett was born in Canterbury, Kent. He was educated at Millfield School. He made his England U18 debut in April 1986, while at Millfield and Canterbury Hockey Club.

He left Canterbury to play club hockey for Teddington Hockey Club in the Men's England Hockey League for the 1988/89 season. He would go on to win the league title in 1995 and the Hockey Association Cup twice in 1994 and 1996.

He made his Great Britain debut during the June 1990 BMW Trophy tournament in Amsterdam. Laslett won the Hockey Writers UK Player of the Year Award in 1991 and the National League Player of the Year Award for the 1990–91 season.

Still at Teddington, he represented Great Britain at the 1992 Olympic Games in Barcelona, participated in the 1994 Men's Hockey World Cup and represented Great Britain at the 1996 Olympic Games in Atlanta, where in the latter he captained the team.

In 2006, he unveiled the new Teddington HC clubhouse along with former teammate Jon Potter.
