= Carolyn Reid =

British field hockey player

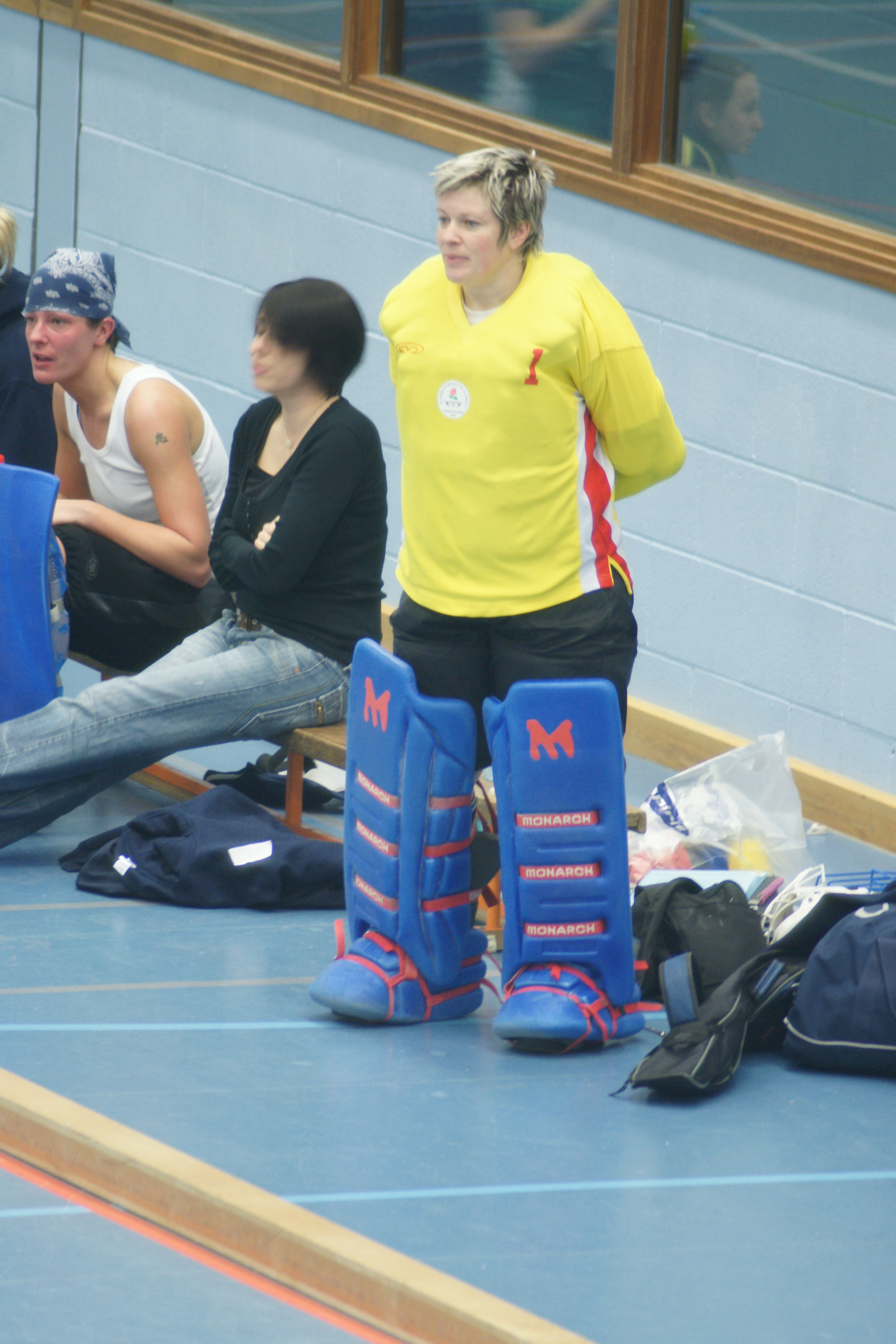

Personal information
- Nationality: English
- Born: 28 March 1972 (age 54) Liverpool, Lancashire, England

Sport
- Sport: Field Hockey
Medal record
Women's field hockey
Commonwealth Games
Representing England
Silver medal – second place	1998 Kuala Lumpur	Team
Silver medal – second place	2002 Manchester	Team
Bronze medal – third place	2006 Melbourne	Team
European Championship
Bronze medal – third place	1999 Cologne	Team

Carolyn Marie Reid (born 28 March 1972) is a retired female field hockey goalkeeper, who was a member of the British squad that competed at the 2000 Summer Olympics in Sydney, Australia. She won a total number of three medals (two silver, one bronze) during her career at the Commonwealth Games.

In 1998, Reid, a teacher at St Nicholas Catholic High School in Northwich won a silver medal at the Commonwealth Games in Malaysia and won the 1998 Hockey Writers' UK Player of the Year, becoming the third Hightown player to have received the award.
