= Jimmy Wallis =

British field hockey player (born 1974)

Personal information
- Born: 13 June 1974 (age 52) London, England
- Height: 5 ft 7 in (170 cm)
- Weight: 146 lb (66 kg)

Sport
- Sport: Field hockey
Senior career
Years	Team	Caps	Goals
1995–2001	Teddington	-	-
2001–2007	Surbiton	-	-
National team
Years	Team	Caps	Goals
–	GB & England		-
Medal record
Men's field hockey
Representing England
Commonwealth Games
Bronze medal – third place	1998 Kuala Lumpur	Team
European Championship
Bronze medal – third place	1999 Padua	Team
Bronze medal – third place	2003 Barcelona	Team

James Wallis (born 13 June 1974) is an English former field hockey midfielder. He competed at the 2000 Summer Olympics and the 2004 Summer Olympics.

== Biography ==
Wallis nicknamed Wal, Kipper and Ratty, played club hockey for Teddington Hockey Club in the Men's England Hockey League. In January 1995 he was selected for the England U21 team.

He made his debut for England in 1995 and represented England and won a bronze medal, at the 1998 Commonwealth Games in Kuala Lumpur.

Still with Teddington he participated in the 1998 Men's Hockey World Cup and appeared for Great Britain at the 2000 Olympic Games in Sydney.

Wallis joined Surbiton from Teddington and represented England at the 2002 Commonwealth Games in Manchester and at the 2004 Olympic Games in Athens he represented Great Britain in the field hockey tournament again.

He now works as a hockey coach and physics teacher at Reed's School in Surrey and plays golf competitively. In 2014, he finished tied first at The Open Championship Regional Qualifying tournament at Hankley Common GC with a 3-under par score of 68.
