= Reading Hockey Club =

English field hockey team

- Founded: 1904
- League: Men's England Hockey League; Women's England Hockey League
- Based in: Reading, England
- Home ground: Sonning Lane
- Colours: Sky Blue, Navy, Navy (H); Navy Blue, Sky, Sky (A)
- President: Geoff Ash
- Chairman: Tim Hunt
- Members: 950

Reading Hockey Club is a professional field hockey club based at Sonning Lane in the English town of Reading. It is one of the most successful clubs in the United Kingdom with National League and Cup honours. The men's team have been champions of England on six occasions and the women's team on three occasions.

The men's first team play in the Men's England Hockey League Premier Division and the Ladies 1st XI team play in the Women's England Hockey League Premier Division.

RHC runs 11 men's teams, 8 ladies teams and has a flourishing junior (colts) section. It is also runs an England Hockey Talent academy. Players range from 5 to 70+ years old. RHC has over 500 senior and nearly 550 junior members and is based at a top class facility in Sonning Lane, where they have been since 1984. There are 2 pitches at the clubhouse, Sonning Lane Water and Sonning Lane Sand.

== History ==
The origins of the club are slightly confusing despite the official formation listed as 1904. A club by the same name existed previously alongside a second club in Reading called Reading Thistles. Mentions of the Reading Hockey Club included a fixture cancellation due to Influenza in 1895 and a defeat to Marlborough in 1900. The Athenian Hockey Club based in Earley, changed its name to Reading Hockey Club in 1903 but to confuse matters further, the club is listed a being re-formed in 1912 following a meeting at the Queen's Hotel and then disbanded in 1913. Once the effects of World War I were out of the way, a new club was formed following a meeting at the George Hotel in September 1920, with a ground at Cintra. By the mid-1920s the club had multiple teams and played at Prospect Park.

A new two-storey clubhouse was constructed and built during 1985.

In 1997, Reading hosted the European Cup Winners Tournament, and more recently, Reading has hosted International matches, alongside charity matches for the Hockey For Heroes.

The men's team have been champions of England on six occasions (1996–97, 2000–01, 2001–02, 2006–07, 2007–08, 2011–12) and the women's team were premier league champions in 2010-11 and 2012-13.

In 2025, Reading won the women's 2024–25 league title and the men's team won Division One South title to return to Premier Division again.

== Players ==
=== Men's First Team Squad 2025–26 season ===
- 2. Chris Wyver (goalkeeper)
- 5. Jamie Rawlings
- 6. Euan Dyer
- 7. Sam Welsh
- 9. Ben Hooper
- 10. Tom Minall
- 11. Caspar Beyer
- 12. Aiden Fraser
- 13. Gregor Hearn
- 15. Rohit Jakhu
- 16. Michael Chapman (captain)
- 17. Callum Smith
- 19. Maks Wyndham-Smith
- 20. Toby Heywood-Bourne
- 22. Frederik Pollard
- 23. Daniel Cox
- 26. Joe Mallett
- 28. George Johnstone
- x. William Holderness

=== Women's First Team Squad 2025–26 season ===
- 2. Nicki Cochrane (goalkeeper)
- 4. Lorna Mackenzie
- 5. Abbie Dixon
- 8. Emma McKenzie Findlay
- 9. Jemima Copeman
- 10. Lizzie Neal
- 11. Annie Wilson
- 12. Madeleine Goodman
- 16. Katie Partridge
- 18. Anna-Rose Gabbitass
- 19. Georgia Jones
- 20. Caroline Spence
- 21. Lucie Daman (captain)
- 22. Rebecca Daniel
- 30. Megan Crowson

== Major National Honours ==
National champions

- 1996-97 Men's League champions
- 2000–01 Men's League champions
- 2001–02 Men's League champions
- 2006–07 Men's League champions
- 2007–08 Men's League champions
- 2011–12 Men's League champions
- 2010–11 Women's League champions
- 2012–13 Women's League champions
- 2024-25 Women's League champions

National Cup Winners

- 1995-96 Men's National Cup winners
- 1998-99 Men's National Cup winners
- 1999-00 Men's National Cup winners
- 2002–03 Men's National Cup winners
- 2003–04 Men's National Cup winners
- 2005–06 Men's National Cup winners
- 2008–09 Men's National Cup winners
- 2014–15 Men's National Cup winners
- 2015–16 Men's National Cup winners
- 2017–18 Men's National Cup winners

National Tournaments

- 2001-02 Men's Premiership Tournament Winners
- 2002-03 Men's Premiership Tournament Winners
- 2003-04 Men's Premiership Tournament Winners
- 2005-06 Men's Super Cup Winners

== Notable players ==
=== Men's internationals ===
Extended content

Player	Events	Notes/Ref
(Scotland) Tommy Alexander	CG (2018)	
(Scotland) Tim Atkins		
(Wales) Matt Wright	WC 2027	
(England) James Bailey	WC (2014)	
(England) Tom Bertram	Oly (2004)	
(England) Nick Brothers	WC (2006, 2010)	
(Wales) James Carson	CG (2018)	
(England) Tom Carson	WC (2014)	
(England) Nicholas Catlin	Oly (2012), WC (2014)	
(England) Darren Cheesman	CT (2012)	
(Republic of Ireland) Chris Cargo		
(England) Jonty Clarke	Oly (2008, 2012), CG (2006), WC (2006, 2010)	
(Wales) Owain Dolan-Gray	CG (2018)	
(Wales) Benjamin Francis	CG (2018)	
(Wales) Jonny Gooch	2016–2017	
(Wales) Howard Hoskin	CG (2002)	
(Wales) Dale Hutchinson	CG (2018)	
(Republic of Ireland) John Jackson		
(England) Hardeep Jawanda		
(Wales) Huw Jones	CG (2014)	
(Wales) Daniel Kyriakides	CG (2018)	
(Republic of Ireland) Stuart Loughrey	WC (2018)	
(England) Iain Mackay	Oly (2012), CG (2010), WC (2010)	
(England) Richard Mantell	Oly (2008), CG (2010), WC (2006, 2010)	
(England) Simon Mantell	Oly (2008), CG (2006, 2010, 2014), WC (2006, 2014)	
(England) Simon Mason	Oly (1996, 2000, 2004), CG (1998, 2002), WC (1998, 2002)	
(Scotland) Lee Morton	CG (2018)	
(Wales) Fred Newbold	WC (2023), EC (2021, 2023, 2025)	
(England) Chris Newman		
(England) Richard Norris	1957–1959	
(England) Mark Pearn	Oly (2000, 2004), CG (1998, 2002), WC (1998, 2002)	
(Scotland) Duncan Riddell	CG (2018)	
(England) Liam Sanford	CG (2018), WC (2018)	
(England) Peter Scott		
(England) Dan Shingles	WC (2014)	
(South Africa) Austin Smith	Oly (2008)	
(Wales) Peter Swainson	2006–2009	
(England) Robert Todd	CG (2002), WC (2002)	
(England) Jimmy Wallis	WC (2002)	
(England) Jon Wyatt	Oly (1996, 2000), CG (1998, 2002), WC (1998, 2002)	

Key

- Oly = Olympic Games
- CG = Commonwealth Games
- WC = World Cup
- CT = Champions Trophy
- EC = European Championships

=== Women's internationals ===
Extended content

Player	Events	Notes/Ref
(England) Alex Danson		
(Netherlands) Chantal de Bruijn		
(England) Susie Gilbert		
(Wales) Sarah Jones		
(Scotland) Emily Maguire		
(England) Livy Paige		
(England) Helen Richardson-Walsh		
(England) Kate Richardson-Walsh		
(England) Beth Storry		
(England) Amy Tennant		
(England) Susannah Townsend		

Key

- Oly = Olympic Games
- CG = Commonwealth Games
- WC = World Cup
- CT = Champions Trophy
- EC = European Championships
