= Phil McGuire (field hockey) =

British field hockey player

Personal information
- Born: 25 August 1970 (age 55) Manchester, England
- Height: 180 cm (5 ft 11 in)
- Weight: 78 kg (172 lb)

Sport
- Sport: Field hockey
Senior career
Years	Team	Caps	Goals
1985–1988	Maidenhead	-	-
1989–1999	Teddington	-	-
National team
Years	Team	Caps	Goals
–	England & Great Britain		-
Medal record
Men's field hockey
Representing England
European Championship
Bronze medal – third place	1995 Dublin	Team

Phillip McGuire (born 25 August 1970) is a British former field hockey player who competed in the 1996 Summer Olympics.

== Biography ==
McGuire, born in Manchester played club hockey for Maidenhead before joining Teddington in the Men's England Hockey League for the 1988/89 season.

While at Teddington, he represented England at the 1994 Men's Hockey World Cup and represented Great Britain at the 1996 Olympic Games in Atlanta.
