= 1990–91 England Hockey League season =

English field hockey season

1990–91 England Hockey League

The 1990–91 English Hockey League season took place from October 1990 until May 1991.

The Men's National League was sponsored by Poundstretcher and was won by Havant. The top four teams qualified to take part in the Poundstretcher League Cup tournament which was won by Hounslow. The Women's National League was sponsored by Typhoo and was won by Slough.

The Men's Hockey Association Cup was won by Hounslow and the Women's Cup (National Club Championship finals) was won by Sutton Coldfield.

== Men's Poundstretcher National League First Division League Standings ==
Pos	Team	P	W	D	L	F	A	GD	Pts
1	Havant	15	11	3	1	45	18	27	36
2	Indian Gymkhana	15	9	3	3	22	16	6	30
3	Hounslow	15	8	4	3	44	18	26	28
4	East Grinstead	15	8	3	4	30	16	14	27
5	Southgate	15	8	1	6	39	27	12	25
6	Old Loughtonians	15	7	4	4	32	22	10	25
7	Slough	15	7	3	5	28	24	4	24
8	Teddington	15	7	3	5	22	27	-5	24
9	Stourport	15	6	4	5	31	29	2	22
10	Bromley	15	6	3	6	24	25	-1	21
11	St Albans	15	6	3	6	34	36	-2	21
12	Cannock	15	5	3	7	19	29	-10	18
13	Neston	15	3	4	8	20	34	-14	13
14	Welton	15	3	2	10	18	28	-10	11
15	Isca	15	2	0	13	17	39	-22	6
16	Wakefield	15	1	3	11	12	49	-37	6

= Champions
= Qualified for League Cup tournament
= Relegated

== Men's League Cup Tournament ==
Round	Date	Team 1	Team 2	Score
Semi-final	Apr 21	Havant	East Grinstead	3-2
Semi-final	Apr 21	Indian Gymkhana	Hounslow	0-2
Final	May 26	Hounslow	Havant	4-1

Hounslow
Richard Purvis, Owen Mackney, Mike Williamson, Jon Potter (capt), Guy Swayne, Jon Rees (Mike Rose sub), Dave Hacker, Andy Ferns, Nick Gordon (Guy Fordham sub), Robert Thompson, Mike Alcock (Andy Thompson sub)
Havant
Jimmy Lewis, David Faulkner (capt), David Roberts, Rob Hill, Steve Lawson, A Cave, M Coleman, Russell Garcia, Stuart Avery, Colin Cooper, J Goldring (Gary Roberts sub)

== Women's Typhoo National League First Division League Standings ==
Pos	Team	P	W	D	L	F	A	Pts
1	Slough	9	7	1	1	20	8	22
2	Leicester	9	5	4	0	15	5	19
3	Sutton Coldfield	9	4	4	1	20	9	16
4	Ipswich	9	4	3	2	16	13	15
5	Hightown	9	5	0	4	9	6	15
6	Chelmsford	9	3	2	4	7	11	11
7	Ealing	9	2	4	3	11	12	10
8	Clifton	9	2	3	4	10	14	9
9	Wimbledon	9	1	1	7	9	26	4
10	Doncaster	9	0	2	7	7	20	2

= Champions

== Men's Nationwide Anglia Cup (Hockey Association Cup) ==
Hounslow won the Men's National Cup.

=== Quarter-finals ===
Team 1	Team 2	Score
Hounslow	Slough	4-1
Stourport	Bromley	2-4
Firebrands	Cannock	2-3 aet
Havant	East Grinstead	3-2 aet

=== Semi-finals ===
Team 1	Team 2	Score
Cannock	Havant	0-5
Bromley	Hounslow	1-3

=== Final ===
(Held at Luton Town Football Club on 7 April)

Team 1	Team 2	Score
Hounslow	Havant	3-2

Hounslow
Richard Purvis, Mike Williamson, Jon Potter (capt), Simon Hazlitt, Paul Bolland, Jon Rees, David Hacker, Andy Ferns, Nick Gordon, Robert Thompson, Andy Thompson (Mike Alcock sub)
Havant
Sean Rowlands, David Faulkner (capt), David Roberts, Rob Hill, Peter Nail, Steve Lawson, M Coleman (J Golding sub), Russell Garcia, Don Williams, Colin Cooper, Stuart Avery (Gary Roberts sub)

== Women's Cup (National Clubs Championship finals) ==
Sutton Coldfield won the Women's National Cup.

=== Group A (Ashford) ===
Pos	Team
1	Ipswich
2	Leicester
3	Ealing
4	Exmouth
5	Great Harwood

=== Group B (Canterbury) ===
Pos	Team
1	Sutton Coldfield
2	Chelmsford
3	Wimbledon
4	Hightown
5	Clifton

= Qualified for semi-finals

=== Semi-finals ===
Team 1	Team 2	Score
Sutton Coldfield	Ipswich	4-2
Leicester	Chelmsford	1-1 (5-3p)

=== Final ===
(Held at Ashford on 21 April)

Team 1	Team 2	Score
Sutton Coldfield	Leicester	1–1 (4-3 p)

Sutton Coldfield
Barbara Hambly
