= 1992–93 England Hockey League season =

English field hockey season

1992–93 England Hockey League

The 1992–93 English Hockey League season took place from October 1992 until March 1993.

The Men's National League was sponsored by PizzaExpress and won by Hounslow. The Women's National League was won by Ipswich.

The Men's Hockey Association Cup was won by Hounslow and the AEWHA Cup was won by Leicester.

== Men's Pizza Express National League First Division League Standings ==
Pos	Team	P	W	D	L	F	A	GD	Pts
1	Hounslow	17	16	0	1	58	14	44	48
2	Southgate	17	13	2	2	54	24	30	41
3	Old Loughtonians	17	11	4	2	42	22	20	37
4	Havant	17	11	2	4	43	23	20	35
5	Firebrands	17	9	5	3	33	27	6	32
6	Stourport	17	9	3	5	31	31	0	30
7	Teddington	17	7	4	6	33	24	9	25
8	St Albans	17	7	4	6	33	24	9	25
9	Slough	17	6	4	7	23	28	-5	22
10	East Grinstead	17	6	3	8	38	31	7	21
11	Bournville	17	6	1	10	22	33	-11	19
12	Cannock	17	6	1	10	25	39	-14	19
13	Bromley	17	4	6	7	25	26	-1	18
14	Trojans	17	4	6	7	25	29	-4	18
15	Welton	17	4	5	8	19	33	-14	17
16	Canterbury	17	4	3	10	26	39	-13	15
17	Neston	17	1	2	14	15	45	-30	5
18	Surbiton	17	0	3	14	26	56	-30	3

= Champions
= Relegated

== Women's National League Premier Division League Standings ==
Pos	Team	P	W	D	L	F	A	Pts
1	Ipswich	11	9	1	1	23	7	28
2	Hightown	11	9	0	2	20	4	27
3	Slough	11	8	1	2	24	8	25
4	Sutton Coldfield	11	7	1	3	19	7	22
5	Clifton	11	5	1	5	12	9	16
6	Ealing	11	4	3	4	9	9	15
7	Leicester	11	4	2	5	13	16	14
8	Chelmsford	11	3	4	4	14	22	13
9	Wimbledon	11	3	2	6	11	25	11
10	Pickwick	11	3	1	7	8	17	10
11	Doncaster	11	1	3	7	4	12	6
12	Exmouth	11	0	1	10	4	25	1

= Champions
= Relegated

== Men's Royal Bank of Scotland Cup (Hockey Association Cup) ==
=== Quarter-finals ===
Team 1	Team 2	Score
Hampstead & Westminster	East Grinstead	0-1
Reading	Beeston	1-0
Guildford	Teddington	1-1 (2-4 p)
Cannock	Hounslow	1-2

=== Semi-finals ===
Team 1	Team 2	Score
Reading	Teddington	1-1*
Hounslow	East Grinstead	3-1

Teddington won on Penalty strokes*

=== Final ===
(Held at Stantonbury Leisure Centre, Milton Keynes on 2 May)

Team 1	Team 2	Score
Hounslow	Teddington	4-1

Hounslow
Jason Barrow, Mike Williamson, Scott Hobson, Paul Bolland, Guy Swayne, Jon Potter, David Hacker, Jon Rees, Nick Gordon, Robert Thompson, Bobby Crutchley
Teddington
Garry Meredith, D Cross, Tony Colclough, Jon Royce, Jimmy Wallis, Jason Laslett (capt), Tyrone Moore, Mark Riley, Jon Hauck, Phil McGuire, Andy Bilson

== Women's Cup (AEWHA Cup) ==
=== Quarter-finals ===
Team 1	Team 2	Score
Leicester	St Albans	5-0
Ipswich	Chelmsford	2-1
Sutton Coldfield	Exmouth	4-0
Ealing	Wimbledon	1-0

=== Semi-finals ===
Team 1	Team 2	Score
Sutton Coldfield	Leicester	0-0 (2-4 p)
Ealing	Ipswich	2-2 (5-3 p)

=== Final ===
(Held at Milton Keynes on 16 May)

Team 1	Team 2	Score
Leicester	Ealing	1-0

Leicester
A Claxton, Emma Newbold, Sue Holwell, Joanne Mould, Kathy Johnson, S Saunders, Gill Moss, Mary Nevill, M Laird, Kim Gordon, Justine Williams subs Gaynor Nash, Lucy Cope, S Naylor
Ealing
Sue Lawrie, Katie Dodd, Sarah Lawfull, Mandy Nicholls, Sally Eyre, Anne Green, Liz Moors, J Hurt, J Caudwell, K Harvey, Rachel O'Grady subs R O'Brien, H North
