= 1989–90 England Hockey League season =

English field hockey season

1989–90 England Hockey League

The 1989–90 English Hockey League season took place from October 1989 until May 1990.

The Men's National League was sponsored by Poundstretcher and was won by Hounslow. The top four teams qualified to take part in the Poundstretcher League Cup tournament which was won by Havant.

The Women's National League was introduced for the first time and the inaugural Women's National League title sponsored by Typhoo was won by Slough.

The Men's Hockey Association Cup was won by Havant and the Women's Cup (National Club Championship finals) was won by Sutton Coldfield.

== Men's Poundstretcher National League First Division League Standings ==
Pos	Team	P	W	D	L	F	A	GD	Pts
1	Hounslow	15	12	2	1	45	16	29	38
2	East Grinstead	15	11	1	3	30	13	17	34
3	Havant	15	10	3	2	36	15	21	33
4	Slough	15	10	3	2	29	16	13	33
5	Southgate	15	10	1	4	36	19	17	31
6	Stourport	15	7	5	3	31	15	16	26
7	Teddington	15	6	4	5	33	25	8	22
8	Welton	15	6	4	5	24	24	0	22
9	Isca	15	6	2	7	28	26	2	20
10	Bromley	15	5	2	8	24	25	-1	17
11	Indian Gymkhana	15	5	2	8	15	27	-12	17
12	Cannock	15	4	3	8	21	35	-14	15
13	Old Loughtonians	15	2	7	6	24	25	-1	13
14	Wakefield	15	3	2	10	17	39	-22	11
15	Harborne	15	1	2	12	15	58	-43	5
16	Reading	15	0	1	14	10	40	-30	1

= Champions
= Qualified for League Cup tournament
= Relegated

== Men's League Cup Tournament ==
Round	Date	Team 1	Team 2	Score
Semi-final	Apr 22	Hounslow	Slough	4-2
Semi-final	Apr 22	Havant	East Grinstead	2-1
Final	May 6	Havant	Hounslow	3-2

Havant
Jimi Lewis, David Faulkner, Steve Lawson, Robert Hill, Peter Nail, A Cave, M Coleman (Stuart Avery sub), Russell Garcia, Don Williams, Colin Cooper, R Seabrook
Hounslow
Richard Purvis, Mike Williamson, Jon Potter (capt), Paul Bolland, Guy Swayne, Martyn Grimley, David Hacker, Andy Ferns, Nick Gordon (Parmi Soor sub), Robert Thompson, Jon Rees

== Women's Typhoo National League First Division League Standings ==
Pos	Team	P	W	D	L	F	A	Pts
1	Slough	9	8	1	0	30	5	34
2	Leicester	9	5	4	0	18	7	26
3	Sutton Coldfield	9	5	2	2	17	6	22
4	Hightown	9	4	3	2	19	12	21
5	Chelmsford	9	4	1	4	14	14	18
6	Clifton	9	3	2	4	7	9	15
7	Ealing	9	3	2	4	12	11	14
8	Orpington	9	1	2	6	6	23	8
9	Great Harwood	9	1	2	6	5	22	7
10	Exmouth	9	1	1	7	4	23	5

= Champions
= Relegated

== Men's Nationwide Anglia Cup (Hockey Association Cup) ==
=== Quarter-finals ===
Team 1	Team 2	Score
Stourport	Southgate	1-0
Reading	Harleston Magpies	1-0
Havant	Isca	3-2 aet
Old Loughtonians	East Grinstead	2-1

=== Semi-finals ===
Team 1	Team 2	Score
Reading	Havant	0-3
Stourport	Old Loughtonians	4-0

=== Final ===
(Held at Luton on 8 April)

Team 1	Team 2	Score
Havant	Stourport	3-0

Havant
Sean Rowlands, David Faulkner, A Cave, Robert Hill, Peter Nail, Steve Lawson, M Coleman (Gary Roberts sub), Russell Garcia, Don Williams, Colin Cooper (Stuart Avery sub), R Seabrook
Stourport
S Taylor, J Lee, N Chaudry, R Lee, J Roberts, D Bleach, G Carlisle, John McPhun (P Harradine sub), David Knott, A Watson (R Jones sub), Imran Sherwani

== Women's Cup (National Clubs Championship finals) ==
=== Group A ===
Pos	Team
1	Hightown
2	Wimbledon
3	Leicester
4	Chelmsford
5	Yate & Gloucester

=== Group B ===
Pos	Team
1	Sutton Coldfield
2	Orpington
3	Exmouth
4	Bracknell
5	Philadelphian Bedans

= Qualified for semi-finals

=== Semi-finals ===
Team 1	Team 2	Score
Sutton Coldfield	Wimbledon	4-2
Hightown	Orpington	2-0

=== Final ===
(Held at Bournemouth Sports Centre on 22 April)

Team 1	Team 2	Score
Sutton Coldfield	Hightown	1-0
