= 1991–92 England Hockey League season =

English field hockey season

1991–92 England Hockey League

The 1991–92 English Hockey League season took place from October 1991 until March 1992.

The Men's National League was sponsored by PizzaExpress and won by Havant . The Women's National League was sponsored by Typhoo and was won by Slough.

The Men's Hockey Association Cup was won by Hounslow and the AEWHA Cup was won by Hightown.

== Men's Pizza Express National League First Division League Standings ==
Pos	Team	P	W	D	L	F	A	GD	Pts
1	Havant	17	14	2	1	54	19	35	44
2	Hounslow	17	13	4	0	52	24	28	43
3	Stourport	17	12	4	1	41	21	20	40
4	Teddington	17	11	4	2	46	23	23	37
5	East Grinstead	17	11	3	3	43	27	16	36
6	Southgate	17	10	2	5	47	27	20	32
7	Old Loughtonians	17	9	1	7	30	23	7	28
8	Cannock	17	8	1	8	38	35	3	25
9	Slough	17	6	4	7	31	30	1	22
10	St Albans	17	6	1	10	31	35	-4	22
11	Neston	17	4	6	7	25	32	-7	18
12	Trojans	17	4	5	8	20	32	-12	17
13	Firebrands	17	4	4	9	28	32	-4	16
14	Bromley	17	4	4	9	18	17	1	16
15	Welton	17	4	2	11	23	33	-10	14
16	Bournville	17	3	4	10	18	41	-23	13
17	Indian Gymkhana	17	3	1	13	12	54	-42	10
18	Lyons	17	1	0	16	11	53	-42	3

= Champions
= Relegated

== Women's Typhoo National League First Division League Standings ==
Pos	Team	P	W	D	L	F	A	Pts
1	Slough	11	10	0	1	38	5	30
2	Leicester	11	8	0	3	18	9	24
3	Hightown	10*	6	2	2	15	9	20
4	Ipswich	10*	5	4	1	23	9	19
5	Ealing	10*	6	1	3	30	11	19
6	Sutton Coldfield	10*	6	1	3	26	8	19
7	Chelmsford	10*	4	3	3	16	11	15
8	Doncaster	11	4	1	6	11	12	13
9	Wimbledon	10*	4	0	6	14	28	12
10	Clifton	11	2	0	9	10	23	6
11	Yate & South Gloucester	10*	1	0	9	6	44	3
12	Sherwood	10*	0	0	10	5	43	0

Missing results* - Ealing v Chelmsford (15 Mar), Sutton Coldfield v Yate (15 Mar), Sherwood v Hightown (15 Mar), Ipswich v Wimbledon

= Champions
= Relegated

== Men's Cup (Hockey Association Cup) ==
=== Quarter-finals ===
Team 1	Team 2	Score
Hounslow	Doncaster	4-0
St Albans	East Grinstead	0-2
Stourport	Teddington	1-1 (4-5p)
Havant	Southgate	0-2

=== Semi-finals ===
Team 1	Team 2	Score
Southgate	Teddington	1-2
Hounslow	East Grinstead	2-0

=== Final ===
(Held at Luton Town Football Club on 3 May)

Team 1	Team 2	Score
Hounslow	Teddington	3-2

Hounslow
Jason Barrow, Simon Hazlitt, Paul Bolland, Mike Williamson, Jon Potter, David Hacker, Andy Ferns (capt), Martyn Grimley, Nick Gordon, Robert Thompson, Jon Rees
Teddington
Garry Meredith, Mark Riley, Stuart Blan, Paul Smith, Jason Laslett (capt), Tyrone Moore, Jon Hauck (N Gardiner sub), Jon Royce, Phil McGuire, Tony Colclough (Martin Le Huray sub), Andy Billson

== Women's Cup (AEWHA Cup) ==
=== Quarter-finals ===
Team 1	Team 2	Score
Leicester	Sutton Coldfield	0-1
Bradford	Blueharts	0-2
Clifton	Hightown	0-1
Slough	Ealing	5-1

=== Semi-finals ===
Team 1	Team 2	Score
Sutton Coldfield	Hightown	2-3
Slough	Blueharts	11-1

=== Final ===
(Held at Milton Keynes on 11 April)

Team 1	Team 2	Score
Hightown	Slough	3-3 (3-2 p)

Scorers
Hightown - Jackie Crook, Fiona Lee, Tina Cullen / Slough - Lesley Hobley, Denise Shorney (2)
