= 1971–72 in English field hockey =

1971–72 England Hockey League

The 1971–72 English Hockey League season took place from September 1971 until April 1972.

The principal event was the inaugural Men's Cup (National Clubs Championship) which was won by Hounslow.

The vast majority of the season consisted of regional leagues. The first National League tournament (The National Inter League Championship) would not be introduced until September 1975.

== Men's Cup (Benson & Hedges National Clubs Championship) ==
=== National rounds (quarter-finals) ===
Team 1	Team 2	Score
Norwich Grasshoppers	Burton-on-Trent	1-0
Portsmouth Command	Hounslow	1–4

=== National rounds (semi-finals) ===
Team 1	Team 2	Score
Norwich Grasshoppers	Bowdon	2-1
Marlborough	Hounslow	0-1

=== Final ===
(Held at Crystal Palace on 16 April)

Team 1	Team 2	Score
Hounslow	Norwich Grasshoppers	3-0

P Morgan F H Scott M Harris Ian Thompson Richard Oliver T Hill Mike Corby Bill Smith Davy McManus Christopher Langhorne Ian Barrett	C Harvey D Clarke G Goodley Robert Stimpson (capt) D Harmer T Hawksley M Eastwood D Storey B Pallett P Wilmore T Weston
