= Loughborough Students' Hockey Club =

English field hockey team

- League: Men's England Hockey League; Women's England Hockey League; Midland Regional Hockey Association; BUCS League
- Home ground: Loughborough University

Personnel
- Captain: Daniel Faulkner (m), Jessica Dyson (w)
- Coach: Jerome Goudie (m), Brett Holland (w)
- Manager: Nick K (m), Paul Gannon (w)
- Website: www.lboro.ac.uk/sport/sports/hockey/

Loughborough Students' Hockey Club is the field hockey club of Loughborough University.

== Recent history ==
The men's 1st XI compete in the Men's England Hockey League and were winners of the BUCS championships for eight of the past thirteen years. They have also won the National Indoor Championships four times since 2003, as well as gold (2004) and bronze (2005) at the European Indoor Challenge, and were quarter-finalists in the Euro Hockey League in 2008. The other men's teams compete in the Midlands League.

The club currently run four teams and compete in the following competitions;

- 1st XI – Men's England Hockey League, BUCS Premier League, BUCS KO Championship
- 2nd XI – Midlands Premier League, BUCS National League, BUCS Trophy KO Cup
- 3rd XI – 1st XI Midlands Premier League, BUCS League Midlands 1A, BUCS Trophy KO Cup
- 4th XI – Central League – Midlands Premier Division, BUCS League Midlands 2A, BUCS Conference KO Cup

The Women's 1st XI team competes in the Premier league of the Women's England Hockey League, BUCS . The team has had great success in BUCS having previously won the Hockey Championship for eleven years straight up to 2008 and are current champions.

The women's club currently run five teams and compete in the following competitions;

- 1st XI - EH Premier League, BUCS Premier League, BUCS KO Championship
- 2nd XI - EH National League North, BUCS League National league, BUCS Trophy KO Cup
- 3rd XI - Midlands Division 1, BUCS League Midlands 2B, BUCS Conference KO Cup
- 4th XI - Leicestershire Women's League Premier Division, BUCS League Midlands 2B, BUCS Conference KO Cup
- 5th XI - Leicestershire Women's League Division 1, BUCS League Midlands 4B, BUCS Conference KO Cup

== Teams ==
=== Women's First Team Squad 2025–26 season ===
- 1. Molly Smith (goalkeeper)
- 3. Amy Birch
- 5. Jessica Dyson (captain)
- 6. Faith Joubert
- 7. Bethany Gardens
- 8. Niamh McIvor
- 9. Emma Uprichard
- 10. Olivia Breed
- 12. Mia Moore
- 13. Philippa Spawforth
- 14. Amy Cradden
- 15. Hollie Dring-Richardson
- 16. Lucy Mackey
- 17. Charlotte Triggs
- 19. Hannah Boss
- 20. Tilly Crampsie

== Notable players ==
=== Men's internationals ===
Extended content

Player	Events/Notes	Ref
(England) Jon Bleby	Olympics (2008), Commonwealths (2006), WC (2006)	
(England) Andy Bull	CT (2010)	
(England) Nicholas Catlin	Commonwealths (2010), WC (2010)	
(Wales) James Davies-Yandle	Commonwealths (2002)	
(Wales) Owain Dolan-Gray	Commonwealths (2014)	
(England) Jerome Goudie	Commonwealths (2002), WC (2002, 2006)	
(England) Glenn Kirkham	Commonwealths (2006), WC (2006)	
(Scotland) Alistair McGregor	Olympics (2008), Commonwealths (2010)	
(England) Richard Smith	Olympics (2012), Commonwealths (2010), WC (2010)	

England

- Richard Alexander
- David Beckett
- Paul Bolland
- Clyde Camburn
- David Condon
- Harry Gibson
- Mark Gleghorne
- Chris Griffiths
- Adam Harper
- Michael Johnson
- Jason Lee
- Iain Lewers
- Steve Long
- Iain Mackay
- James Mazarelo
- Sean Rowlands
- Stuart Rushmere
- Ian Sloan
- Samuel Ward
- Henry Weir
- David Whitaker
- Alastair Wilson
- Duncan Woods

Ireland

- Timothy Cockram
- Fergus Gibson
- Mark Gleghorne
- Paul Gleghorne
- John Jackson
- Iain Lewers
- Stuart Loughrey
- Ian Sloan
- David Smyth

Scotland

- David Ralph
- Derek Salmond
- Mark Zander

Wales

- Matt Grace
- Zak Jones

Canada

- Rob Smith

Switzerland

- Fabio Reinhard

Others

- Danny Kerry - England/Great Britain coach

=== Women's internationals ===
England

- Giselle Ansley
- Jennie Bimson
- Catherine De Ledesma
- Fiona Greenham
- Sabbie Heesh
- Beckie Herbert
- Maddie Hinch
- Katie Long
- Hannah Macleod
- Lizzie Neal
- Mary Nevill
- Charlotte Watson
- Isabelle Petter
- Miriam Pritchard
- Ellie Rayer
- Laura Unsworth
- Nicola White
- Kerry Williams

Wales

- Emma Batten
- Beth Bingham
- Hannah Cozens
- Sarah Jones
- Megan Lewis-Williams
- Phoebe Richards
- Leah Wilkinson

Scotland

- Robyn Collins

== Honours ==
- Men's National Cup
  - Runners Up: 2004–05
