= 1978–79 in English field hockey =

English field hockey season

- Teams: westcliff

1978–79 was the fifth official season in English field hockey since the introduction of an organised league structure and the eighth season featuring the National Clubs Championship.

The Men's Cup was won by Slough who defeated Neston in the final. In the final of the women's cup Chelmsford defeated Leicester 3-0.

The Men's National Inter League Championship, sponsored by Truman's Brewery, brought together the winners of their respective regional leagues. The championship finals were held at Ealing on 22 and 23 September 1979 and won by Isca.

== Men's National Inter League Championship ==
(Held at the Barclays Bank Ground, Ealing, 22–23 September)

=== Group A ===
Team 1	Team 2	Score
Isca	Preston	4–0
Southgate	Sheffield	–
Isca	Sheffield	4–2
Southgate	Preston	–
Preston	Sheffield	–
Isca	Southgate	1–0

Pos	Team	P	W	D	L	F	A	Pts
1	Isca	3	3	0	0	9	2	6
	Southgate	3						
	Preston	3						
	Sheffield	3						

=== Group B ===
Pos	Team	P	W	D	L	F	A	Pts
1	Westcliff	3						
	Stourport	3						
	Trojans	3						
	Worthing	3						

= Qualified for final

=== Final ===
Team 1	Team 2	Score	Ref
Isca	Westcliff	3–1	

== Men's Cup (Rank Xerox National Clubs Championship) ==
Sough won the Men's National Cup.

=== Semi-finals ===
(Held on 21 April 1979)

Team 1	Team 2	Score	Ref
Blueharts	Neston	1–4	
Slough	Ipswich	1–0	

=== Final ===
(Held on 6 May 1979 at Slough)

Team 1	Team 2	Score	Scorers
Slough	Neston	FT 3-1 (HT 2-0)	Kehar (2), Churcher / Smith

Slough
Ian Taylor, Andy Churcher
Sutinder Khehar
Neston
Nick Mullen, Peter Wise (gk), Steve Greene, John Swift, Colin Cubley, George Haslam, Julian Manchett, Robbie Smith, Malcolm Wilkinson, Bob Lloyd, Geoff Poole (capt), Doug Norval, Pete Renshaw, Phil McKeown

== Women's Cup (National Clubs Championship) ==
Chelmsford won the Women's National Cup final, held on 7 April at Bedford.

=== Semi-finals ===
Team 1	Team 2	Score
Chelmsford	Orpington	0-0 (Chelsford won on pens)
Leicester		-

=== Final ===
Team 1	Team 1	Score
Chelmsford	Leicester	3-0
