= Midland Regional Hockey Association =

Midlands Hockey Association
- Sport: Field Hockey
- Jurisdiction: Midlands
- Abbreviation: MHA
- Affiliation: England Hockey

Official website
- www.mrha.co.uk

The Midlands Hockey Association is the organising body for field hockey in the Midlands, England. It feeds teams into the Men's and Women's England Hockey Leagues and receives teams from regional and county leagues.

== League structure ==
The men's and women's Midlands Hockey league structure consists of a Premier Division 1 that feeds into the National League, and then regional and sub-regional divisions. The Midlands area covers following counties:

- Derbyshire
- Leicestershire
- Northamptonshire
- Nottinghamshire
- Rutland
- Shropshire
- Staffordshire
- Warwickshire
- West Midlands
- Worcestershire

== Recent champions ==
Extended content

=== Midlands Men's Premier Division ===
Season	Champions	Runners Up
2000–01		Leek M1s
2001–02		Leek M1s
2002–03	Leek M1s	Coventry & North Warwick M1s
2003–04	University of Birmingham M1s	Coventry & North Warwick M1s
2004–05	Lichfield M1s	West Bridgford M1s
2005–06	Sikh Union (Nottingham) M1s	Telford & Wrekin M1s
2006–07	Telford & Wrekin M1s	Harborne M1s
2007–08	Harborne M1s	Chesterfield M1s
2008–09	Harborne M1s	Coventry & North Warwick M1s
2009–10	Olton & West Warwicks M1s	Lichfield M1s
2010–11	Lichfield M1s	Khalsa M1s
2011–12	Khalsa M1s	West Bridgford M1s
2012–13	West Bridgford M1s	Rugby & East Warwickshire M1s
2013–14	Barford Tigers M1s	Bournville M1s
2014–15	Lichfield M1s	Bournville M1s
2015–16	Leek M1s	University of Nottingham M1s
2016–17	University of Nottingham M1s	Khalsa M1s
2017–18	Belper M1s	Harborne M1s
2018–19	Harborne M1s	Barford Tigers M1s
2019–20	University of Birmingham M2s	Beeston M2s
2020–21	Cancelled due to COVID-19	
2021–22	University of Nottingham M2s	Loughborough Students M2s
2022–23	Stourport M1s	Khalsa Leamington M1s
2023–24	Repton M1s	Khalsa Leamington M1s
2024–25	Leek M1s	Loughborough Students M2s
2025–26	Nottingham Trent University M1s	Telford & Wrekin M1s

=== Midlands Women's Premier Division ===
Season	Champions	Runners Up
2000–01		
2001–02		
2002–03	Worcester Norton W1s	Nottingham Highfields W1s
2003–04	Nottingham Highfields W1s	Belper W1s
2004–05	Belper W1s	Cannock W1s
2005–06	Cannock W1s	Olton & West Warwicks W2s
2006–07	Bedford W1s	Matlock Baileans W1s
2007–08	Leicester W2s	Loughborough Students W2s
2008–09	Northampton Saints W1s	Loughborough Students W2s
2009–10	Worcester W1s	Kettering W1s
2010–11	Northampton Saints W1s	Bedford W1s
2011–12	Stourport W1s	Beeston W2s
2012–13	Beeston W2s	Boots W1s
2013–14	Beeston W2s	University of Birmingham W2s
2014–15	Belper W1s	University of Birmingham W2s
2015–16	University of Birmingham W2s	Northampton Saints W1s
2016–17	Beeston W2s	University of Birmingham W2s
2017–18	University of Birmingham W2s	Belper W1s
2018–19	University of Nottingham W1s	Beeston W2s
2019–20		
2020–21	Cancelled due to COVID-19	
2021–22	Rugby & East Warwickshire W1s	Matlock Baileans W1s
2022–23	Repton M1s	Khalsa Leamington W1s
2023–24	Loughborough Students W2s	University of Nottingham W2s
2024–25	Nottingham Trent University W1s	University of Nottingham W2s
2025–26	University of Nottingham W2s	Loughborough Students W3s
