= 2003 Men's EuroHockey Nations Championship =

Tournament details
- Host country: Spain
- City: Barcelona
- Dates: 1–13 September 2003
- Teams: 12 (from 1 confederation)
- Venue: Pau Negre Stadium

Final positions
- Champions: Germany (6th title)
- Runner-up: Spain
- Third place: England

Tournament statistics
- Matches played: 42
- Goals scored: 219 (5.21 per match)
- Top scorer: (Spain) Santiago Freixa (10 goals)

The 2003 Men's EuroHockey Nations Championship was the ninth edition of the Men's EuroHockey Nations Championship, the quadrennial international men's field hockey championship of Europe organized by the European Hockey Federation. It was held from 1 until 13 September 2003 in Barcelona, Spain.

This was the last EuroHockey Nations Championship with 12 teams. The 4 teams ending 9th, 10th, 11th, and 12th were relegated to the EuroHockey Nations Trophy. The 8 remaining teams played in the 2005 Men's EuroHockey Nations Championship. The tournament also served as a direct qualifier for the 2004 Summer Olympics, with the winner Germany qualifying.

Three-time defending champions Germany won their sixth overall title by defeating the hosts Spain 5–4 in penalty strokes after the match finished 1–1 after extra time. England won the bronze medal by defeating the Netherlands 6–5 in penalty strokes after the match finished 1–1 after extra time.

== Qualified teams ==
| Dates | Event | Location | Quotas | Qualifier(s) |
|---|---|---|---|---|
| —N/a | Host | —N/a | 1 | Spain |
| 1–12 September 1999 | 1999 European Championship | Padua, Italy | 4 | Belgium; England; Germany; Netherlands |
| 8–14 July 2002 | 2003 European Championship qualification | Poznań, Poland | 2 | Poland; Scotland |
| 8–14 July 2002 | 2003 European Championship qualification | Dublin, Ireland | 2 | Italy; Ireland |
| 8–14 July 2002 | 2003 European Championship qualification | Moscow, Russia | 2 | Russia; Switzerland |
| 13–15 September 2002 | 2003 European Championship play-off | Terrassa, Spain | 1 | France |
| Total | | | 12 | |

== Format ==
The twelve teams were split into two groups of six teams. The top two teams advanced to the semi-finals in order to determine the winner in a knockout system. The 3rd and 4th placed teams from each pool played for the 5th to 8th place, while the 5th and 6th placed teams from each pool played for the 9th to 12th place. The last four teams were relegated to the EuroHockey Nations Challenge.

== Results ==
All times were local (UTC+2).

=== Preliminary round ===
==== Pool A ====
| Pos | Team | Pld | W | D | L | GF | GA | GD | Pts | Qualification |
|---|---|---|---|---|---|---|---|---|---|---|
| 1 | Germany | 5 | 5 | 0 | 0 | 21 | 5 | +16 | 15 | Semi-finals |
| 2 | Spain (H) | 5 | 4 | 0 | 1 | 22 | 11 | +11 | 12 | Semi-finals |
| 3 | France | 5 | 2 | 1 | 2 | 11 | 11 | 0 | 7 | 5–8th place semi-finals |
| 4 | Belgium | 5 | 1 | 2 | 2 | 13 | 13 | 0 | 5 | 5–8th place semi-finals |
| 5 | Ireland | 5 | 1 | 1 | 3 | 12 | 17 | −5 | 4 | 9–12th place semi-finals |
| 6 | Russia | 5 | 0 | 0 | 5 | 2 | 24 | −22 | 0 | 9–12th place semi-finals |

(H) Hosts

1 September 2003
13:00

| France | 3–0 | Russia |

1 September 2003
16:00

| Belgium | 1–4 | Germany |

1 September 2003
19:00

| Ireland | 4–6 | Spain |

3 September 2003
11:30

| Germany | 2–0 | France |

3 September 2003
14:30

| Russia | 0–3 | Ireland |

3 September 2003
19:00

| Spain | 3–2 | Belgium |

4 September 2003
16:00

| Ireland | 1–4 | Germany |

4 September 2003
19:00

| France | 2–2 | Belgium |

4 September 2003
20:00

| Russia | 0–5 | Spain |

6 September 2003
11:00

| Ireland | 1–4 | France |

6 September 2003
13:00

| Russia | 1–5 | Belgium |

6 September 2003
19:00

| Germany | 3–2 | Spain |

8 September 2003
11:00

| Belgium | 3–3 | Ireland |

8 September 2003
13:00

| Germany | 8–1 | Russia |

8 September 2003
19:00

| Spain | 6–2 | France |

==== Pool B ====
| Pos | Team | Pld | W | D | L | GF | GA | GD | Pts | Qualification |
|---|---|---|---|---|---|---|---|---|---|---|
| 1 | Netherlands | 5 | 4 | 0 | 1 | 25 | 9 | +16 | 12 | Semi-finals |
| 2 | England | 5 | 3 | 1 | 1 | 14 | 9 | +5 | 10 | Semi-finals |
| 3 | Poland | 5 | 3 | 0 | 2 | 18 | 13 | +5 | 9 | 5–8th place semi-finals |
| 4 | Scotland | 5 | 3 | 0 | 2 | 10 | 11 | −1 | 9 | 5–8th place semi-finals |
| 5 | Italy | 5 | 1 | 1 | 3 | 4 | 17 | −13 | 4 | 9–12th place semi-finals |
| 6 | Switzerland | 5 | 0 | 0 | 5 | 8 | 20 | −12 | 0 | 9–12th place semi-finals |

2 September 2003
11:00

| Scotland | 3–4 | Poland |

2 September 2003
14:30

| England | 2–2 | Italy |

2 September 2003
17:30

| Switzerland | 2–8 | Netherlands |

4 September 2003
13:00

| Poland | 3–2 | Switzerland |

4 September 2003
14:00

| Netherlands | 0–3 | England |

4 September 2003
15:00

| Italy | 0–1 | Scotland |

5 September 2003
14:00

| Poland | 3–4 | Netherlands |

5 September 2003
16:00

| Switzerland | 1–2 | Italy |

5 September 2003
18:00

| Scotland | 2–1 | England |

7 September 2003
11:00

| Netherlands | 5–1 | Scotland |

7 September 2003
13:00

| Italy | 0–5 | Poland |

7 September 2003
19:00

| England | 4–2 | Switzerland |

8 September 2003
15:00

| Italy | 0–8 | Netherlands |

8 September 2003
17:00

| Switzerland | 1–3 | Scotland |

8 September 2003
19:00

| Poland | 3–4 | England |

=== Ninth to twelfth place classification ===
9–12th place semi-finals
10 September
Italy | 2
Russia | 1
10 September
Ireland | 5
Switzerland | 2

Ninth place
12 September
Italy | 2
Ireland | 3
Eleventh place
12 September
Russia | 2
Switzerland | 4

==== 9–12th place semi-finals ====
10 September 2003
14:00

| Italy | 2–1 | Russia |

10 September 2003
14:00

| Ireland | 5–2 | Switzerland |

==== Eleventh place game ====
12 September 2003
09:00

| Russia | 2–4 | Switzerland |

==== Ninth place game ====
12 September 2003
11:00

| Italy | 2–3 | Ireland |

=== Fifth to eighth place classification ===
5–8th place semi-finals
10 September
France (p.s.o.) | 1 (4)
Scotland | 1 (2)
10 September
Poland | 4
Belgium | 5

Fifth place
12 September
France (a.e.t.) | 4
Belgium | 3
Seventh place
11 September
Scotland | 1
Poland | 2

==== 5–8th place semi-finals ====
10 September 2003
16:30

| France | 1–1 (a.e.t.) | Scotland |
Penalties
| | 4–2 |

10 September 2003
19:00

| Poland | 4–5 | Belgium |

==== Seventh place game ====
12 September 2003
14:00

| Scotland | 1–2 | Poland |

==== Fifth place game ====
12 September 2003
19:00

| France | 4–3 (a.e.t.) | Belgium |

=== First to fourth place classification ===
Semi-finals
11 September
Netherlands | 2
Spain | 5
11 September
Germany | 5
England | 1

Final
13 September
Germany (p.s.o.) | 1 (5)
Spain | 1 (4)
Third place
13 September
England (p.s.o.) | 1 (6)
Netherlands | 1 (5)

==== Semi-finals ====
11 September 2003
16:30

| Germany | 5–1 | England |

11 September 2003
19:00

| Netherlands | 2–5 | Spain |

==== Third place game ====
13 September 2003
16:30

| England | 1–1 (a.e.t.) | Netherlands |
Penalties
| | 6–5 |

==== Final ====
13 September 2003
19:00

| Germany | 1–1 (a.e.t.) | Spain |
|---|---|---|
| C. Zeller 33' | Report | Freixa 20' |
Penalties
| C. Zeller (penalty shoot-out scored); Kunz (penalty shoot-out scored); Landshut (penalty shoot-out scored) (penalty shoot-out missed); Weißenborn (penalty shoot-out scored); C. Zeller (penalty shoot-out scored) | 5–4 | (penalty shoot-out missed); (penalty shoot-out scored) Amat; (penalty shoot-out scored) Freixa; (penalty shoot-out scored) Ribas; (penalty shoot-out scored) Garza (penalty shoot-out missed) |

== Final standings ==
| Pos | Team | Qualification or relegation |
|---|---|---|
| Gold medal | Germany | Qualification for the 2004 Summer Olympics |
| Silver medal | Spain | |
| Bronze medal | England | |
| 4 | Netherlands | |
| 5 | France | |
| 6 | Belgium | |
| 7 | Poland | |
| 8 | Scotland | |
| 9 | Ireland | Relegation to the Nations Trophy |
| 10 | Italy | Relegation to the Nations Trophy |
| 11 | Switzerland | Relegation to the Nations Trophy |
| 12 | Russia | Relegation to the Nations Trophy |

== Goalscorers ==
There were 219 goals scored in 42 matches, for an average of 5.21 goals per match.

10 goals

- (Spain) Santiago Freixa

9 goals

- (France) Frederic Soyez
- (Ireland) Justin Sheriff

8 goals

- (Germany) Björn Michel
- (Netherlands) Bram Lomans

7 goals

- (Switzerland) Thierry Grandchamp

6 goals

- (Poland) Tomasz Dulkiewicz
- (Poland) Zbigniew Juszczak

5 goals

- (Belgium) Xavier Reckinger
- (Germany) Christoph Bechmann
- (Netherlands) Taeke Taekema

4 goals

- (Belgium) Jérôme Toussaint
- (England) Benjamin Hawes
- (England) Martin Jones
- (Germany) Matthias Witthaus
- (Ireland) Mark Irwin
- (Poland) Artur Mikula
- (Spain) Pol Amat

3 goals

- (Belgium) Jean-Philippe Brulé
- (France) Julien Boyer
- (Germany) Florian Kunz
- (Germany) Christopher Zeller
- (Ireland) Stephen Butler
- (Italy) Massimo Lanzano
- (Netherlands) Ronald Brouwer
- (Poland) Piotr Mikula
- (Scotland) David Ralph
- (Spain) Alberto Esteban
- (Spain) Eduardo Tubau

2 goals

- (Belgium) Maxime Luycx
- (Belgium) Charles Vandeweghe
- (England) Barry Middleton
- (Germany) Maximilian Landshut
- (Italy) Andrea De Bortoli
- (Netherlands) Rob Derikx
- (Netherlands) Piet-Hein Geeris
- (Netherlands) Karel Klaver
- (Netherlands) Rob Reckers
- (Poland) Tomasz Choczaj
- (Poland) Miroslaw Juszczak
- (Russia) Dmitri Chelesttouk
- (Scotland) David Mitchell
- (Scotland) Graham Moodie
- (Scotland) Andrew Sewnauth
- (Spain) Juan Escarré
- (Spain) Xavier Ribas
- (Switzerland) Michael Kloter
- (Switzerland) Xavier Peny

1 goal

- (Belgium) Marc Coudron
- (Belgium) Dennis Dijkshoorn
- (Belgium) Philippe Goldberg
- (Belgium) Gilles Pètre
- (Belgium) Loïc Vandeweghe
- (England) Brett Garrard
- (England) Jerome Goudie
- (England) Daniel Hall
- (England) Craig Parnham
- (England) Mark Pearn
- (England) James Wallis
- (France) Florent Durchon
- (France) Nicolas Gaillard
- (France) Nicolas Monnier
- (France) Frédéric Verrier
- (Germany) Christoph Eimer
- (Germany) Björn Emmerling
- (Ireland) Andrew Barbour
- (Ireland) Gordon Elliott
- (Ireland) Christopher Jackson
- (Ireland) Jonathan Jermyn
- (Italy) Gianluca Cirilli
- (Italy) Michele Cirina
- (Italy) Loris Perelli
- (Netherlands) Matthijs Brouwer
- (Netherlands) Nick Meijer
- (Netherlands) Teun de Nooijer
- (Netherlands) Sander van der Weide
- (Poland) Dariusz Małecki
- (Russia) Igor Ivanov
- (Russia) Alexei Tchernikov
- (Russia) Dmitry Volkov
- (Scotland) Jonathan Christie
- (Scotland) Graham Dunlop
- (Scotland) Mark Ralph
- (Spain) Ramón Alegre
- (Spain) Pau Quemada
- (Spain) Josep Sánchez
- (Spain) Víctor Sojo
- (Switzerland) Oliver Bilgerig
- (Switzerland) Thomas Gähwiler
- (Switzerland) Beni Steinemann

Source: EHF

== Medalists ==
| Pos | Team | Players |
|---|---|---|
| 1 | Germany | Clemens Arnold, Christoph Bechmann, Sebastian Biederlack, Philipp Crone, Christoph Eimer, Björn Emmerling, Michael Green, Florian Kunz, Max Landshut, Björn Michel, Sascha Reinelt, Christian Wein, Tibor Weissenborn, Timo Wess, Matthias Witthaus, Christopher Zeller, Philipp Zeller, Christian Schulte |
| 2 | Spain | Eduardo Aguilar, Nacho Alborch, Ramón Alegre, Pol Amat, Miquel Codina, Quico Cortés, Juan Escarré, Alberto Esteban, Alex Fábregas, Kiko Fábregas, Santi Freixa, Rodrigo Garza, Bernardino Herrera, Pau Quemada, Xavier Ribas, Josep Sanchez, Victor Sojo, Eduard Tubau |
| 3 | England | Jimi Lewis, Simon Mason, Robert Todd, Jason Collins, Jon Peckett, Craig Parnham, Guy Fordham, Andy West, Mark Pearn, Jimmy Wallis, Brett Garrard, Danny Hall, Ben Hawes, Barry Middleton, Martin Jones, Mike Johnson, Jerome Goudie, Jonty Clarke |

== See also ==
- 2003 Women's EuroHockey Nations Championship
