= John Jackson (field hockey) =

Irish field hockey player (b. 1986)

Personal information
- Full name: John Jackson
- Born: 21 February 1986 (age 40) County Antrim, Northern Ireland
- Height: 170 cm (5 ft 7 in)
- Weight: 73 kg (161 lb)

Sport
- Sport: Field hockey
- Position: Defender/Midfielder
Youth career
- Years: Team
- 1990–2004: Mossley
- 1997–2003: → Ballyclare High School
- 2003–2004: → RBAI
Senior career
Years	Team	Caps	Goals
2004–2010	Loughborough Students	-	-
2010–2011	Mossley	-	-
2011–2013	Braxgata HC	-	-
2013–2016	Reading	-	-
2016–2021	Team Bath Buccaneers	-	-
2017	→ Mossley	-	-
2023–	City of Bath Hockey Club	-	-
National team
Years	Team	Caps	Goals
2006–	Ireland	254	-
Coaching career
- 2013–2016: Marlborough College
- 2016–2021: Prior Park College
- 2021-: Kingswood School
Medal record
Representing Ireland
EuroHockey Championships
Bronze medal – third place	2015 London

John Jackson (born 21 February 1986) is an Ireland men's field hockey international. He was a member of the Ireland team that won the bronze medal at the 2015 Men's EuroHockey Nations Championship. He also represented Ireland at the 2016 Summer Olympics. At club level, he has played for both Loughborough Students and Reading in the Euro Hockey League. He also won the EHA Cup with Reading in 2014–15. He is currently head coach of City of Bath Hockey Club and plays for the club's first team, helping them gain promotion to the West Open - Men's Division 1 North

== Early years, family and education ==
Jackson's father, Peter Jackson, has been involved in hockey since the 1970s as a player, coach, manager, administrator and supporter. He played for Collegians, Parkview and Mossley. Between 2003 and 2018 he served as the Ireland men's national field hockey team manager. Jackson's mother also acted as the team doctor at the 2014–15 Men's FIH Hockey World League Semifinals. Between 1997 and 2003 John Jackson attended Ballyclare High School. Between 2003 and 2004 he attended the Royal Belfast Academical Institution. Jackson subsequently attended Loughborough University where he completed a degree in Ergonomics. In 2013 Jackson married Rachel Arnold, a fellow graduate of Loughborough University. She works as a sports psychologist in the Department for Health at the University of Bath. She is also field hockey player and has played for Team Bath Buccaneers, Loughborough Students and Clifton.

== Domestic teams ==
=== Mossley ===
Jackson began playing field hockey as a four-year old at Mossley He continued playing for Mossley until he left for Loughborough University in 2004. He returned to Mossley during the 2010–11 season while working for Sport Northern Ireland. In December 2017 he returned to Mossley and helped them reach the final of the Kirk Cup.

=== RBAI ===
In 2003–04, together with Paul Gleghorne and Michael Watt, Jackson was a member of the Royal Belfast Academical Institution team that won the McCullough Cup, the Burney Cup and the All Ireland Schoolboys Hockey Championship.

=== Loughborough Students ===
Between 2004 and 2010 Jackson played for Loughborough Students. Jackson captained Loughborough Students and was named player of the year in 2005–06 and 2009–10. Together with Paul Gleghorne, he also played for Loughborough in the 2007–08 Euro Hockey League.

=== Braxgata ===
Between 2011 and 2013 Jackson played as a professional for Braxgata in the Men's Belgian Hockey League.

=== Reading ===
Between 2013 and 2016 Jackson played for Reading in the Men's England Hockey League. Together with Chris Cargo, he also played for Reading in the 2013–14 Euro Hockey League. In 2014–15, Jackson helped Reading win the EHA Cup.

=== Team Bath Buccaneers ===
In 2016 Jackson began playing for Team Bath Buccaneers in Tier 2 of the Men's England Hockey League (MEHL). In the autumn of 2019, Jackson suffered the second hockey-related skull fracture of his career, during training with the Buccaneers; by January 2021, he had recovered enough to return to training with the team, preparing for competition in Tier 2 of the 2021–22 MEHL season.

== Ireland international ==
Jackson made his senior debut for Ireland in June 2006 against England. He was a member of the Ireland teams that won the 2009 Men's EuroHockey Nations Trophy and the 2011 Men's Hockey Champions Challenge II. Jackson also helped Ireland win Men's FIH Hockey World League tournaments in 2012 and 2015. Jackson captained Ireland at the 2013 Men's EuroHockey Nations Championship and he scored the equaliser in a 3–3 draw against the Czech Republic. This draw secured Ireland's place in the top level of EuroHockey Nations Championship. He has since captained Ireland over forty times. He was also a member of the Ireland team that won the bronze medal at the 2015 Men's EuroHockey Nations Championship. He also represented Ireland at the 2016 Summer Olympics. In June 2017 Jackson was a member of the Ireland team that won the Hamburg Masters, defeating Germany 4–2 in the final. In July 2019, during a two-match series against Scotland, Jackson became the third Ireland men's international, after Eugene Magee and Ronan Gormley, to make 250 senior appearances. In December 2021, having already returned to his Bath Buccaneers club from an autumn 2020 skull fracture, Jackson was a member of the Irish side that played three indoor friendlies against Scotland.

Tournaments	Place
2009 Men's Hockey Champions Challenge II	2nd
2009 Men's EuroHockey Nations Trophy	1st
2009 Men's Hockey World Cup Qualifiers	3rd
2011 Men's Hockey Champions Challenge II	1st
2011 Men's EuroHockey Nations Championship	5th
2012 Men's Field Hockey Olympic Qualifier	2nd
2012–13 Men's FIH Hockey World League Round 1	1st
2012 Men's Hockey Champions Challenge I	3rd
2012–13 Men's FIH Hockey World League Round 2	2nd
2012–13 Men's FIH Hockey World League Semifinals	7th
2013 Men's EuroHockey Nations Championship	6th
2014 Men's Hockey Champions Challenge I	4th
2014 Men's Hockey Investec Cup	2nd
2014–15 Men's FIH Hockey World League Round 2	1st
2014–15 Men's FIH Hockey World League Semifinals	5th
2015 Men's EuroHockey Nations Championship	3rd place, bronze medalist(s)
2016 Summer Olympics	10th
2017 Hamburg Masters	1st
2016–17 Men's FIH Hockey World League Semifinals	5th
2017 Men's EuroHockey Nations Championship	6th
2018 Men's Four Nations Cup	4th
2018–19 Men's FIH Series Finals	2nd
2019 Men's EuroHockey Nations Championship	8th

== Coaching and teaching ==
Throughout his field hockey playing career, Jackson has also worked as coach. Between 2004 and 2010, while attending Loughborough University he coached several university teams. During this time he also coached at Ratcliffe College. Between April 2010 and September 2011, Jackson worked for Sport Northern Ireland as an 'active communities' coach, coaching elderly, disabled and youth groups. Between 2011 and 2013, while playing for Braxgata, he served as an assistant coach of the women's first eleven and as head coach of the under-16 girls team that won a 2012–13 national championship.

In September 2013 he was appointed senior hockey coach at Marlborough College, and began coaching youth teams at Marlborough Hockey Club. In 2016 he was appointed head of hockey at Prior Park College, Bath, where he also teaches academic Physical education. He also began coaching the University of Bath Hockey Club women's first eleven.

== Honours ==
Ireland

- Hamburg Masters
  - Winners: 2017
- Men's FIH Hockey World League Round 1
  - Winners: 2012 Cardiff
- Men's FIH Hockey World League Round 2
  - Winners: 2015 San Diego
  - Runners up: 2013 New Delhi
- Men's FIH Series Finals
  - Runners up: 2019 Le Touquet
- Men's Hockey Champions Challenge II
  - Winners: 2011
  - Runners up: 2009
- Men's EuroHockey Nations Trophy
  - Winners: 2009
- Men's Field Hockey Olympic Qualifier
  - Runners up: 2012
- Men's Hockey Investec Cup
  - Runners up: 2014

Reading

- EHA Cup
  - Winners: 2014–15

Mossley

- Kirk Cup
  - Runners up: 2017

RBAI

- All Ireland Schoolboys Hockey Championship
  - Winners: 2003–04
- Burney Cup
  - Winners: 2003–04
- McCullough Cup
  - Winners: 2003–04
