= Brian Purdy =

British field hockey player

Personal information
- Born: Q2.1946 Portsmouth, England

Sport
- Sport: Field hockey
Senior career
Years	Team	Caps	Goals
1966–1967	R.A.F	-	-
1967–1973	Fareham	-	-
1973–1975	Trojans	-	-
1977–1987	Havant	-	-
National team
Years	Team	Caps	Goals
–	Great Britain		-
–	England		-

Brian M. Purdy (born Q2.1946) is a former British hockey international.

== Biography ==
Purdy was in the R.A.F and was capped by the England U23 team in 1966.

He played club hockey for Fareham Hockey Club in the Men's England Hockey League and while at Fareham made his England debut in March 1968 and was in the training squad for the 1973 Men's Hockey World Cup but eventually missed out on the final 16.

After moving from Fareham to Trojans Hockey Club he was selected by England for the 1975 Men's Hockey World Cup in Kuala Lumpur.

He later played for Havant Hockey Club.
