= 1972–73 in English field hockey =

1972–73 England Hockey League

The 1972–73 English Hockey League season took place from September 1972 until May 1973.

The principal event was the Men's Cup (National Clubs Championship) which was won by Hounslow.

The vast majority of the season consisted of regional leagues. The first National League tournament (The National Inter League Championship) would not be introduced until September 1975.

== Men's Cup (Benson & Hedges National Clubs Championship) ==
=== Quarter-finals ===
Team 1	Team 2	Score
Bristol	Hightown	1-0
Colchester	Hounslow	0-4

=== Semi-finals ===
Team 1	Team 2	Score
UK Land Forces	Bristol	1-2
Cannock	Hounslow	0-3

=== Final ===
(Held at Colston's School, Bristol on 6 May)

Team 1	Team 2	Score
Hounslow	Bristol	4-0

P Morgan F H Scott I S Steepe Ian Thompson W Morris Glen Evans John Grimmer Mike Corby Bill Smith Christopher Langhorne Ian Barrett	C Davis D Wright P Gillsland R Lang J Spencer B Allfrey D Gibbs J Evans R Jacob B Stokes R Reid
