= John Hurst (field hockey) =

British field hockey player (born 1952)

Personal information
- Born: Q1 1952 St Albans, England

Sport
- Sport: Field hockey
- Position: Goalkeeper
Senior career
Years	Team	Caps	Goals
1976–1989	St Albans	-	-
National team
Years	Team	Caps	Goals
–	GB		-
–	England		-
Medal record
Field hockey
Representing Great Britain
Champions Trophy
Silver medal – second place	1985 Perth	Team competition

John Hurst (born Q1 1952) is a British former field hockey player who played for GB and England. He was the manager of the women's gold winning team at the 2016 Summer Olympics.

== Biography ==
Hurst born in St Albans, England, and educated at St Albans Grammar School and Furzedown College. He played club hockey for his home town St Albans Hockey Club in the Men's England Hockey League. He was a schoolteacher by trade at Durrants School in Watford.

Hurst became the number one goalkeeper at St Albans and Hertfordshire at county level. He made his England debut in March 1977 at the Rank Xerox hockey tournament at Lords and played at the 1978 Men's Hockey World Cup and the 1982 Men's Hockey World Cup.

In February 1985, Hurst was selected as the fourth goalkeeper for the England men's training squad at Bisham Abbey that remarkably contained three goalkeepers with the surname Taylor, Nick Taylor Steve Taylor and Ian Taylor. He made his Great Britain debut on against Malaysia at Luton. He was part of the silver medal winning Great Britain team that competed at the 1985 Men's Hockey Champions Trophy in Perth, Australia.

Hurst was named in the training squad for the 1988 Summer Olympics, but did not make the final cut having to settle for being a non-travelling reserve.

After retiring from playing, he became a coach and coached the England team during the 1990 Men's Hockey World Cup. He also managed the GB men's team to European bronze in 1991. He became a consultant for the national governing body and was involved with Team GB at six Olympic Games and five Commonwealth Games. He was the England goalkeeping performance coach from 1989 to 2011 and a GB and England coaching consultant until 2019.

Hi career highlight was being the manager of the women's gold winning team at the 2016 Olympics in Rio. A position in which he retired from afterwards.
