= John Bell (field hockey) =

British hockey player (born 1933)

Personal information
- Born: 26 February 1933 (age 93) Luton, England

Sport
- Sport: Field hockey
- Position: Centre-half
Senior career
| Years | Team | Caps | Goals |
| 1960–1961 | Army | - | - |
| 1961–1962 | Sutton Coldfield | - | - |
National team
| Years | Team | Caps | Goals |
| – | Great Britain | | - |
| – | England | | - |

John H. Bell (born 26 February 1933) is a British field hockey player. He competed at the 1960 Summer Olympics.

== Biography ==
Bell was a Sutton Coldfield doctor serving in the Royal Army Medical Corps. He played club hockey for the Army and for Sutton Coldfield Hockey Club.

He played at county level for Staffordshire and the Warwickshire before entering the British Army.

He represented Great Britain in the field hockey tournament at the 1960 Olympic Games in Rome.
