= City of Bath Hockey Club =

British field hockey club

- Sport: Field hockey
- Founded: 2000
- League: West Hockey Association
- Location: Bath, Somerset, England
- Website: https://www.cobhc.org.uk/

City of Bath Hockey Club is an English field hockey club based in Bath, Somerset.

The club was formed in 2000 through the merger of Bath Hockey Club and Phillipians Hockey Club, continuing a hockey tradition in the city dating back to the nineteenth century.

In 2026, Mendip Hockey Club merged with City of Bath Hockey Club.

The club operates five men's teams and three women's teams competing in the West Hockey Association leagues. The club also fields mixed and masters teams and operates a junior section.

The club's clubhouse facilities are provided by Lansdown Cricket Club, while playing pitches are provided by Kingswood School.

== History ==
City of Bath Hockey Club traces its origins to two historic Bath hockey clubs: Bath Hockey Club, founded in 1889, and Phillipians Hockey Club, founded in 1957.

=== Bath Hockey Club ===
Bath Hockey Club was formed in 1889 by Weston Cricket Club and is regarded as one of the oldest hockey clubs in Somerset.

Early records of the club are limited, with many documents lost during air raids on Bath during the Second World War. However, surviving records and newspaper reports confirm matches being played against clubs including Bristol, Weston-super-Mare and East Gloucestershire during the late nineteenth and early twentieth centuries.

In the 1903–04 season, Bath Hockey Club hosted an England versus Wales international match at Lansdown Ground.

In the 1910–11 season, Bath, Weston and Green Park hockey clubs amalgamated to form Bath Hockey Club.

The club experienced one of its most successful seasons in 1912–13, recording 20 wins from 23 matches.

During the First World War, hockey activity was suspended, but the club was reformed in 1919. Following the war, matches were played at the Recreation Ground, with changing facilities provided at the Bath Swimming Baths.

During the Second World War, hockey was again suspended, with normal club activities resuming in 1945.

In 1947, Bath Hockey Club established a relationship with Alkmaar Mixed Hockey Club in the Netherlands. This relationship continued for several decades, including player exchanges between the two clubs.

During the 1950s, Bath enjoyed one of the most successful periods in its history. The club later expanded its activities during the 1970s, joining the West of England League during the 1977–78 season and introducing mixed hockey.

A youth coaching programme was introduced during the 1980s, initially under the guidance of Paul Keen. The programme expanded to include teams across multiple age groups, including an under-18 side competing in the Somerset County League during the 1987–88 season.

By the late 1980s, the club had expanded to five teams, veterans teams and indoor hockey participation.

In 1989, Bath Hockey Club celebrated its centenary with the publication of A Centenary Celebration 1889–1989, compiled by club secretary Patrick Ost.

=== Phillipians Hockey Club ===
Phillipians Hockey Club was established in 1957 and later became one of the clubs that contributed to the formation of City of Bath Hockey Club.

=== Formation of City of Bath Hockey Club ===
In 2000, Bath Hockey Club merged with Phillipians Hockey Club to form City of Bath Hockey Club.

The merger created City of Bath Hockey Club, with the aim of maintaining competitive hockey opportunities within the city.

=== Recent history ===
In 2018, the club redesigned its crest to recognise the history of the clubs that contributed to City of Bath Hockey Club, incorporating the foundation years of Bath Hockey Club (1889) and Phillipians Hockey Club (1957).

In 2026, Mendip Hockey Club merged with City of Bath Hockey Club following Mendip Hockey Club's decision to dissolve after 50 seasons. The club crest was subsequently updated to recognise Mendip Hockey Club's formation in 1975.

== Teams ==
City of Bath Hockey Club operates teams across men's, women's, mixed, masters and junior sections.

The club currently fields five men's teams and three women's teams competing in the West Hockey Association leagues.

The club's teams have received coverage in local sports reporting, including match results involving the men's, women's and mixed teams.

The club's mixed team has also featured in local sports reporting through match coverage against other local hockey sides.

The club also runs mixed and masters hockey alongside a junior development programme, providing opportunities for players across a range of ages and abilities.

== Facilities ==
City of Bath Hockey Club is based in Bath, Somerset.

The club's clubhouse facilities are provided by Lansdown Cricket Club, while training and match pitches are provided by Kingswood School.
