= Jimi Lewis =

British field hockey player (born 1974)

Personal information
- Born: 5 July 1974 (age 52) Lydney, Gloucestershire, England
- Height: 180 cm (5 ft 11 in)
- Weight: 74 kg (163 lb)

Sport
- Sport: Field hockey
- Position: Goalkeeper
Senior career
Years	Team	Caps	Goals
1992–1997	Havant	-	-
1997–2004	Cannock	-	-
2004–2013	Großflottbeker THGC	-	-
National team
Years	Team	Caps	Goals
–	GB & England		-
Medal record
Men's field hockey
Representing England
European Championship
Bronze medal – third place	2003 Barcelona	Team

James Lewis (born 5 July 1974) is an English former field hockey goalkeeper, who was a member of the Great Britain squad that finished ninth at the 2004 Summer Olympics in Athens.

== Biography ==
Lewis played club hockey for Havant in the Men's England Hockey League and became an England U21 international. He made his international debut in Malaysia in 1994, playing against South Africa but was second choice goalkeeper behind Simon Mason for many major tournaments.

After joining Cannock, he represented England at the 2002 Commonwealth Games in Manchester.

At the 2004 Olympic Games in Athens he represented Great Britain in the field hockey tournament. After the Olympics he left Cannock to join Gross Flottbeker in Germany.

From 1 March 2016, Lewis coached the German DHB Hockey national team goalkeepers. Lewis often travelled to Spain, and coached hockey for Marshland High School in Norfolk, along with another former international, Paul Swinburn.

As of 2023, he was living in Germany.
