= Team Bath Buccaneers Hockey Club =

British field hockey team

- Full name: Team Bath Buccaneers Hockey Club
- Nickname(s): Team Bath Buccs or 'Buccs'
- League: Men's England Hockey League; West Hockey Association
- Founded: 1955
- Home ground: University of Bath, Bath (Capacity 1,000)
- Website: www.teambathbuccaneers.co.uk

Team Bath Buccaneers Hockey Club is a field hockey club based in Bath, Somerset, England. It is one of the largest and most successful Hockey Clubs in the West of England with over 800 members. The club enter teams in both the Men's The club also enters men's teams in the Gocrea8 League www.wswhl.co.uk and ladies teams playing in West Hockey Association. It also has a thriving Junior Academy of 450 players and 19 teams plus Masters, Summer and Indoor sections.

The Club's motto is Fast, Fearless, Fun.

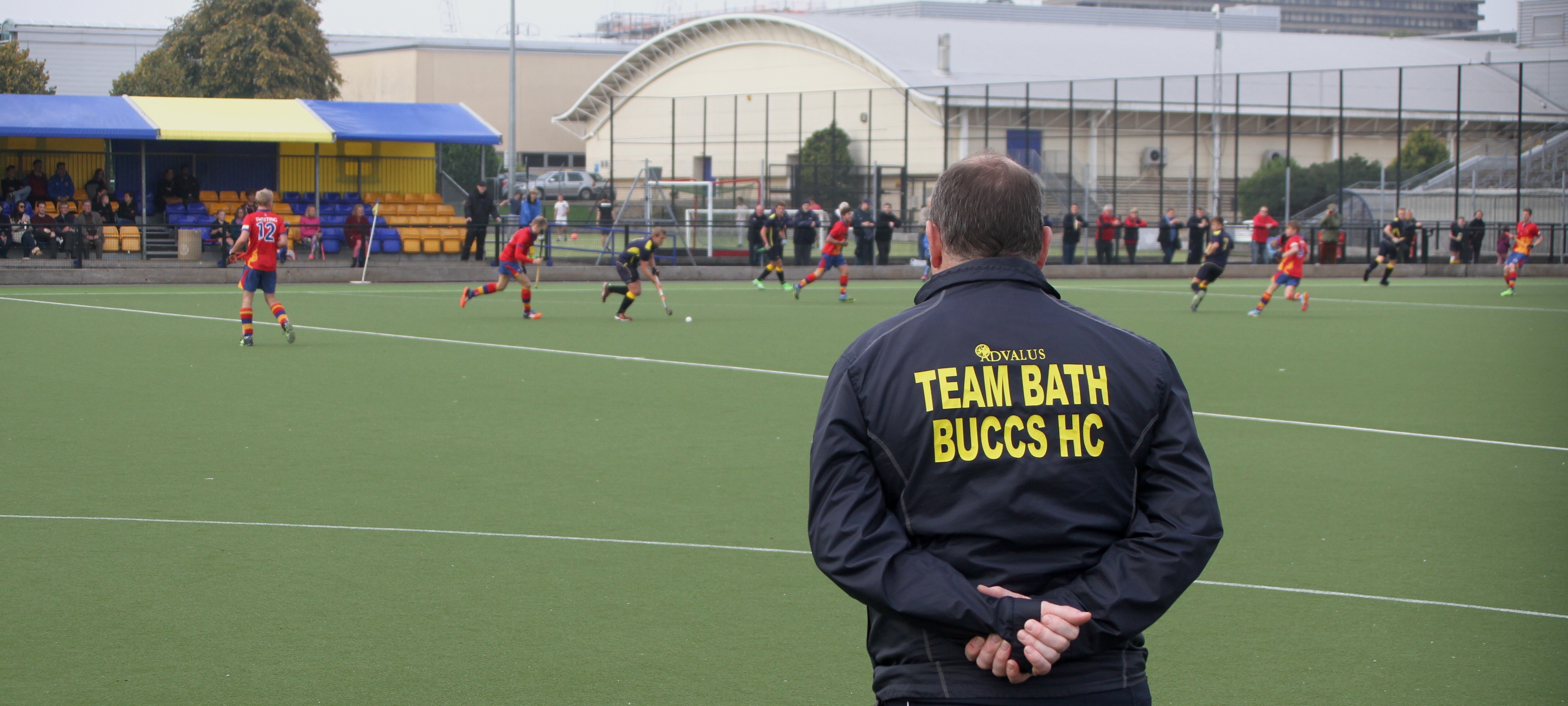
Sitec Arena, Sports Training Village, University of Bath in 2015

The Club was established in 1955. The Club has had a partnership with the University of Bath since 1999, and the home ground at University of Bath sports training village, with a clubhouse at the Lime Tree on campus.

== Notable players ==
Oliver Brown

=== Men's internationals ===
Extended content

Player	Events/notes	Ref
(Scotland) Tim Atkins		
(England) James Bailey		
(Republic of Ireland) Chris Cargo		
(Wales) Benjamin Carless	CG (2014)	
(England) Bobby Crutchley	(WC 2006), assistant coach	
(South Africa) Wayne Denne		
(Republic of Ireland) John Jackson		
(Republic of Ireland) Stuart Loughrey		
(England) Simon Nicklin	Olym (1992), WC (1994)	
(South Africa) Jody Paul		
(Wales) Lewis Prosser	CG (2014)	
(England) Stuart Rushmere		
(Wales) Matthew Ruxton	CG (2014)	
(England) Liam Sanford		
(England) Peter Scott		
(England) Oliver Brown		

Key

- Oly = Olympic Games
- CG = Commonwealth Games
- WC = World Cup
- CT = Champions Trophy
- EC = European Championships

=== Women's internationals ===
Extended content

Player	Events	Notes/Ref
(England) Sophie Hamilton		
(England) Denise Marston-Smith		
(England) Zoe Shipperley		
