= Robbie Smith (field hockey) =

British field hockey player

Personal information
- Born: England

Sport
- Sport: Field hockey
- Position: Forward
Senior career
Years	Team	Caps	Goals
1971–1977	Oxton	-	-
1977–1989	Neston	-	-
National team
Years	Team	Caps	Goals
–	Great Britain		-
–	England		-

Robert William Smith is a former British hockey international.

== Biography ==
Smith played club hockey for Oxton Hockey Club and represented Cheshire at county level. While at Oxton, he was called up for England during November 1974 and was selected by England for the 1975 Men's Hockey World Cup in Kuala Lumpur.

For the 1977/78 season he moved from Oxton to join Neston Hockey Club in the Men's England Hockey League. and while at Neston was selected by England again for the 1978 Men's Hockey World Cup.

He played for Neston in the final of the National Clubs Championship during the 1978–79 season and helped the club win it during the 1982–83 season.
