= West Hockey Association =

Field hockey governing body in England

- Sport: Field Hockey
- Jurisdiction: West of England, South West of England, South Wales
- Abbreviation: WHA
- Affiliation: England Hockey

Official website
- west.englandhockey.co.uk

West Hockey Association runs field hockey leagues for teams based in the West of England, the South West of England and South Wales. The leagues feed teams into the Men's and Women's England Hockey Leagues and receives teams from sub-regional (county) leagues.

== League Structure ==
The West Men's Hockey League is the men's league and covers fifteen counties from England and South Wales. The league comprises 25 divisions across seven tiers of the league pyramid.

The West Women's Hockey League is the women's league and predominantley covers nine counties from England, with the Premier Division covering additional counties from South Wales. There is a separate South Wales Women's Hockey League that covers teams in South Wales and feeds teams from their Premier 1 into the West Women's Premier. The catchment area covers the following counties:

- Avon
- Cornwall
- Devon
- Dorset
- Gloucestershire
- Herefordshire
- Somerset
- Wiltshire
- Channel Islands
- Carmarthenshire (men's general, women's Premier)
- Ceredigion (men's general, women's Premier)
- Glamorgan (men's general, women's Premier)
- Monmouthshire (men's general, women's Premier)
- Pembrokeshire (men's general, women's Premier)
- Powys (men's general, women's Premier)

== Recent champions ==
Extended content

=== West Men's Premier Division ===
Season	Champions	Runners Up
2001–02	Team Bath Buccaneers M1s	Isca M1s
2002–03	Whitcurch M1s	Taunton Vale M1s
2003–04	Whitcurch M1s	Isca M1s
2004–05	Plymouth Marjon M1s	Cardiff M1s
2005–06	University of Exeter M1s	Isca M1s
2006–07	Cardiff M1s	Robinsons M1s
2007–08	Cardiff & Met M1s	Gloucester City M1s
2008–09	Plymouth Marjon M1s	Taunton Vale M1s
2009–10	University of Exeter M1As	Cheltenham M1s
2010–11	Cardiff & Met M1s	Robinsons M1s
2011–12	Bristol Firebrands M1s	University of Exeter M1As
2012–13	Isca M1s	University of Exeter M1As
2013–14	University of Exeter M1As	Whitchurch M1s
2014–15	Isca M1s	Bristol Firebrands M1s
2015–16	University of Bristol M1s	Cardiff & Met M1As
2016–17	Clifton Robinsons M1s	University of Cardiff M1s
2017–18	University of Bristol M1s	Plymouth Marjon M1s
2018–19	Ashmoor M1s	Cheltenham M1s
2019–20		
2020–21	Cancelled due to COVID-19	
2021–22		
2022–23	Cheltenham M1s	Team Bath Buccaneers M2s
2023–24	Team Bath Buccaneers M2s	Whitchurch M1s
2024–25	Cardiff & Met M2s	Cheltenham M1s
2025–26	Bristol Firebrands M1s	Truro M1s

=== West Women's Premier Division ===
Season	Champions	Runners Up
2001–02		
2002–03		
2003–04		
2004–05		
2005–06		
2006–07		
2007–08		
2008–09		
2009–10		
2010–11	Gloucester City W1s	Bournemouth W1s
2011–12	Taunton Vale W1s	Bournemouth W1s
2012–13	Exe W1s	Cheltenham W1s
2013–14	Cheltenham W1s	Team Bath Buccaneers W1s
2014–15	University of Bristol W1s	Exe W1s
2015–16	Exe W1s	Cheltenham W1s
2016–17	Clifton Robinsons W2s	Team Bath Buccaneers W1s
2017–18	Clifton Robinsons W2s	Exe W1s
2018–19	Team Bath Buccaneers W1s	Cheltenham W1s
2019-20		
2020–21	Cancelled due to COVID-19	
2021–22		
2022–23	Clifton Robinsons W2s	Cardiff & Met W1s
2023–24	Lansdown W1s	Penarth W1s
2024–25	Cardiff & Met W1s	University of Bristol W1s
2025–26	Penarth W1s	University of Bristol W1s
