= Martin Jones (field hockey) =

British field hockey player (born 1981)

Personal information
- Born: 8 February 1981 (age 45) England
- Height: 176 cm (5 ft 9 in)
- Weight: 65 kg (143 lb)

Sport
- Sport: Field hockey
- Position: Forward
Senior career
Years	Team	Caps	Goals
1998–2008	Cannock	-	-
2009–2017	Beeston	-	-
2018–2019	Repton	-	-
National team
Years	Team	Caps	Goals
–	GB & England	118	-
Medal record
Men's field hockey
Representing England
European Championship
Bronze medal – third place	2003 Barcelona	Team

Martin Jones (born 8 February 1981) is a British former field hockey player, who played for Great Britain and England.

== Biography ==
Jones was educated at Repton School and was an under-18 England international when he signed to play club hockey for Cannock in the Men's England Hockey League for the 1998/99 season.

He made his full senior England debut in 2001 and was selected for the 2002 Men's England Hockey League. Jones scored a match-winning hat-trick against the Netherlands during the 2003 Men's EuroHockey Nations Championship.

Still at Cannock, he represented England at the 2005 Men's EuroHockey Nations Championship and was part of the England Commonwealth Games team at the 2006 Commonwealth Games in Melbourne. Additionally, he played at the 2006 Men's Hockey World Cup.

He left Cannock to join Beeston, and after his international retirement, Jones had won 118 caps for England and Great Britain. He became head coach at Beeston, winning two England Hockey Men's Championship Cups and two Premier League Championship titles as coach.

Later, Jones became Director of hockey Repton School and head hockey coach of Repton Hockey Club.
