= David Thomas (field hockey) =

British field hockey player (1927–2024)

Personal information
- Born: 27 June 1927 Pontypridd, Wales
- Died: 24 June 2024 (aged 96)

Sport
- Sport: Field hockey
Senior career
Years	Team	Caps	Goals
1949–1962	Hounslow	-	-
National team
Years	Team	Caps	Goals
–	Great Britain		-
–	Wales		-

David Frederick Colman Thomas (27 June 1927 – 24 June 2024) was a British field hockey player. He competed at the 1956 Summer Olympics.

== Biography ==
Thomas played club hockey for Hounslow Hockey Club and county hockey for Middlesex. He represented Wales at national level.

Thomas represented Great Britain in the field hockey tournament at the 1956 Olympic Games in Melbourne.

Thomas died on 24 June 2024, at the age of 96.
