= Matthew Ruxton =

Welsh field hockey player

Matt Ruxton
Personal information
- Born: 7 September 1981 (age 44) Isle of Sheppey, Kent, England

Sport
- Sport: Field hockey
- Position: Midfield
Senior career
Years	Team	Caps	Goals
2001–2009	Stourport	-	-
2009–2015	Team Bath	-	-
National team
Years	Team	Caps	Goals
2003–2015	Wales	117	-

Matthew Morgan Ruxton (born 7 September 1981) is a former field hockey player who represented Wales. He competed for Wales at the 2014 Commonwealth Games.

== Biography ==
Ruxton, born in Isle of Sheppey, Kent, studied Sport and Exercise Sciences at the University of Birmingham.

Ruxton played club hockey for Stourport Hockey Club in the Men's England Hockey League, with whom he made his Wales debut against Belgium in 2003 and in June 2009, he became the captain of his nation and earned his 50th cap.

Ruxton joined Team Bath Buccaneers Hockey Club and earned his 100th Welsh cap and was selected to represent the Welsh team at the 2014 Commonwealth Games in Glasgow, Scotland in the men's tournament.

In September 2017, Ruxton became Director of Sport at Bradfield College.
