= Jerome Goudie =

British field hockey player (born 1977)

Personal information
- Born: 21 February 1977 (age 49) Hong Kong, China

Sport
- Sport: Field hockey
Senior career
Years	Team	Caps	Goals
1995–2007	Loughborough Students	-	-
National team
Years	Team	Caps	Goals
–2007	GB	21	-
2001–2007	England	106	-
Medal record
Men's field hockey
Representing England
European Championship
Bronze medal – third place	2003 Barcelona	Team

Jerome Goudie (born 21 February 1977) is a Hong Kong born, British former field hockey player who played for GB and England.

== Biography ==
Goudie born in Hong Kong, was educated at Millfield Academy and was a competent squash player, playing for the Hong Kong U19 team and competing in the 1992 World Junior Championships. He studied Sports Science and Recreation Management at Loughborough University in 1995 and played for Loughborough Students' in the Men's England Hockey League.

He played international hockey initially for Hong Kong, appearing in the 1998 Asian Games in Bangkok but while at Loughborough he made his debut for England in 2001 and represented England at the 2002 Commonwealth Games in Manchester.

In 2007, Goudie retired from international competition but continued to play for Loughborough Students and became a full-time hockey coach with them at the same time. He won 21 caps for Great Britain and 106 caps for England.

In 2013 Goudie became the Head Coach for Loughborough Students, replacing David Ralph and Jon Bleby who had joined England Hockey as assistant coaches.
