= Veryan Pappin =

Scottish field hockey player

Personal information
- Born: 19 May 1958 (age 68) Henley-on-Thames, England
- Height: 183 cm (6 ft 0 in)
- Weight: 82 kg (181 lb)

Sport
- Sport: Field hockey
- Position: Goalkeeper
Senior career
Years	Team	Caps	Goals
1980–1986	RAF	-	-
1986–1990	Hounslow	-	-
National team
Years	Team	Caps	Goals
1983–1988	Great Britain	18	-
–	Scotland	37	-
Medal record
Men's field hockey
Representing Great Britain
Olympic Games
Gold medal – first place	1988 Seoul	Team competition
Bronze medal – third place	1984 Los Angeles	Team competition
Champions Trophy
Bronze medal – third place	1984 Karachi	Team competition

Veryan Guy Henry Pappin (born 19 May 1958) is an English born former field hockey player who represented Scotland and was a member of the gold medal-winning Great Britain squad at the 1988 Summer Olympics in Seoul.

== Biography ==
Pappin was born in Henley-on-Thames, Oxfordshire but represented Scotland. He grew up on a farm in Moretonhampstead and was educated at Wolborough Hill School, Newton Abbot, Kelly College and the University of Exeter.

His association with Scotland started when he played Highland league hockey while posted at RAF Lossiemouth. By trade he was a physical education officer in the Royal Air Force. He made his Great Britain debut on 15 December 1983.

At the 1984 Olympic Games in Los Angeles, he represented Great Britain in he hockey tournament and won a bronze medal, although he had to play understudy to Ian Taylor, arguably the world's leading goalkeeper at the time and consequently did not get any game time. He was also part of the bronze medal winning Great Britain team that competed at the 1984 Men's Hockey Champions Trophy, in Karachi, Pakistan.

He signed to play club hockey for Hounslow Hockey Club in the Men's England Hockey League from 1986 and at the 1988 Olympic Games in Seoul, Pappin represented Great Britain again but was still reserve behind Ian Taylor. He played in the last minute of the final and was able to collect his gold medal as a result.

At retirement he had earned 37 caps for Scotland and 18 for Great Britain.
