= Justin Pidcock =

British field hockey player

Personal information
- Born: Q2. 1968 Market Bosworth, Leicestershire, England

Sport
- Sport: Field hockey
Senior career
Years	Team	Caps	Goals
1988–1992	Neston	-	-
1993–2000	Cannock	-	-
2000–2013	Bowdon	-	-
National team
Years	Team	Caps	Goals
–	England	50	-
Medal record
field hockey
Representing England
Commonwealth Games
Bronze medal – third place	1998 Kuala Lumpur	Team

Justin Thomas Pidcock (born Q2. 1968) is a British former field hockey player.

== Biography ==
Pidcock represented Cheshire at county level before he joined Neston to play club hockey in the Men's England Hockey League for the 1988/89 season. He was called up for the full England squad in April 1992.

Midway through the 1992/93 season he signed to play for Cannock and while at the club represented England and won a bronze medal, at the 1998 Commonwealth Games in Kuala Lumpur and participated in the 1998 Men's Hockey World Cup. He missed much of the 1999/2000 season after snapping a kneecap. He joined Bowdon in late 2000 and became a player coach before being their full time coach.

== Family ==
His nephew is cyclist Tom Pidcock.
