= Simon Mason (field hockey) =

English field hockey player

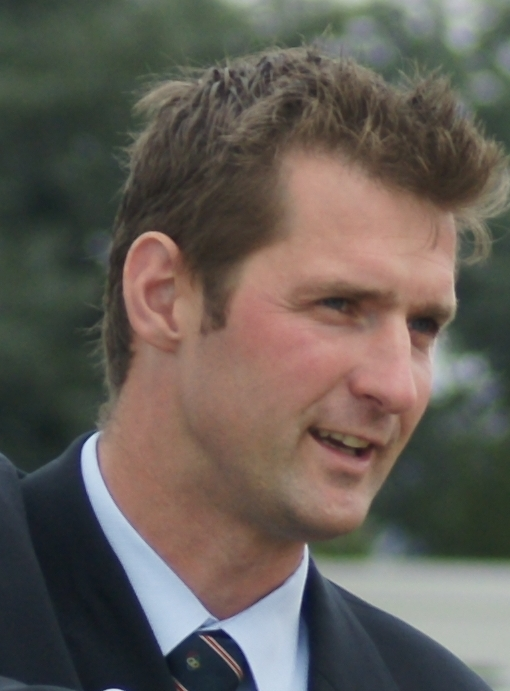
- Mason in 2010

Personal information
- Born: 30 March 1973 (age 53) Harpenden, Hertfordshire, England
- Height: 196 cm (6 ft 5 in)
- Weight: 88 kg (194 lb)

Sport
- Sport: Field hockey
- Position: Goalkeeper
Senior career
| Years | Team | Caps | Goals |
| 1990–1995 | Firebrands | - | - |
| 1995–2008 | Reading | - | - |
| 2008–2015 | Guildford | - | - |
| 2015–2017 | Indian Gymkhana | - | - |
National team
| Years | Team | Caps | Goals |
| 1993–2005 | GB | 74 | - |
| 1993–2005 | England | 120 | - |
Medal record
field hockey
Representing England
Commonwealth Games
| Bronze medal – third place | 1998 Kuala Lumpur | Team |
European Championship
| Bronze medal – third place | 1995 Dublin | Team |
| Bronze medal – third place | 1999 Padua | Team |
| Bronze medal – third place | 2003 Barcelona | Team |

Simon Graham Mason (born 30 March 1973) is an English male former field hockey goalkeeper who competed at three Olympic Games in 1996, 2000 and 2004.

== Biography ==
Mason born in Harpenden, Hertfordshire, England and was educated at Katharine Lady Berkley School and called up to the England U18 squad in 1990. Nicknamed Long Arm of the Law, he played club hockey for Firebrands in the Men's England Hockey League becoming club captain and making his England and Great Britain debuts and participating in the 1994 Men's Hockey World Cup, before joining Reading in 1995, following the Bristol club's relegation.

While at Reading, he competed at the 1996 Olympic Games in Atlanta, representing Great Britain, won a bronze medal for England at the 1998 Commonwealth Games in Kuala Lumpur, and went to his second Olympics, at the 2000 Olympic Games in Sydney.

Mason represented England at the 2002 Commonwealth Games in Manchester before appearing at his third Olympic Games in 2004 in Athens.

He retired from international hockey in 2005 but continued to play for Reading before joining Guildford for seven seasons and then Indian Gymkhana.

He is a resident of Woking, and is co-owner and managing director of Mercian Sports Company a specialist field hockey equipment company. He was the President of the England Hockey Board (2010–2013), is a current member of the executive board for the European Hockey Federation and was on the Athlete Committees for both the International Hockey Federation and the Organising Committee for the London Olympic Games (2005–2012).
