= Jon Bleby =

British field hockey player (born 1979)

Personal information
- Born: 11 September 1979 (age 46) Torquay, England
- Height: 180 cm (5 ft 11 in)
- Weight: 75 kg (165 lb)

Sport
- Sport: Field hockey
- Position: Defender
Senior career
Years	Team	Caps	Goals
2002–2009	Loughborough Students	-	-
National team
Years	Team	Caps	Goals
–2009	GB	37	-
2001–2009	England	54	-

Jonathan David Bleby (born 11 September 1979) is a former international field hockey player who played as a defender for England and Great Britain and appeared at the 2008 Summer Olympics.

== Biography ==
Bleby made his England debut against Poland in 2001.

Bleby played club hockey for Loughborough Students in the Men's England Hockey League and while at Loughborough he represented England at the 2006 Commonwealth Games in Melbourne and represented Great Britain at the 2008 Olympic Games in Beijing in the field hockey tournament.

By the time Bleby retired from international hockey in 2009, he had won 54 caps representing England and 37 caps representing Great Britain.

He took up coaching and was the coach of his club side Loughborough Students but in 2013, he left Loughborough at the same time as fellow coach David Ralph as the pair took appointments with England Hockey as an assistant coaches. They were replaced by Jerome Goudie.

In 2016 he became England coach after stepping up from being the England U21 men's head coach. In 2022 and 2023 Bleby was head coach of the Great Britain men's national field hockey team.

He now works for Independent Coach Education, the leading provider of coach education in the UK.
