= Ian Thomson (field hockey) =

British field hockey player

Personal information
- Born: 1952 England
- Died: 22 January 2016 (aged 63–64)

Sport
- Sport: Field hockey
- Position: Centre half
Senior career
Years	Team	Caps	Goals
1972–1980	Houslow	-	-
National team
Years	Team	Caps	Goals
–	England	39	-
–	Great Britain	21	-

Ian Andrew Thomson (born 1952) was a field hockey international player who represented England and Great Britain.

== Biography ==
Thomson played club hockey for Hounslow Hockey Club in the Men's England Hockey League.

While at Hounslow he played for England at the 1975 Men's Hockey World Cup in Kuala Lumpur and the 1978 Men's Hockey World Cup. He would have gone to the 1980 Summer Olympics but for the Great Britain boycott of the Games.

At international retirement he had earned 39 caps for England and 21 caps for Great Britain. He became an active member of the Ladykillers Hockey Club and was their captain from 1977 to 1985.

Thomson worked as a senior partner and GP at Lechlade Medical Centre. He was diagnosed with a brain tumour and died shortly afterwards on 22 January 2016.
