= 2003 Men's EuroHockey Nations Championship qualification =

Field hockey tournament

Tournament details
- Dates: 8 July – 15 September 2002
- Teams: 21 (from 1 confederation)
- Venue: 4 (in 4 host cities)

Tournament statistics
- Matches played: 53
- Goals scored: 290 (5.47 per match)

The 2003 Men's EuroHockey Nations Championship qualification was the seventh and last edition of the qualifying round for the Men's EuroHockey Nations Championship. It took place from 8 July to 15 September 2002 in four different venues with 21 teams playing for seven quotas at the 2003 European Championship.

Spain qualified directly as the hosts while Belgium, England, Germany and the Netherlands qualified by their position in the 1999 European Championship.

== Tournament 1 ==
Tournament 1
Tournament details
- Host country: Poland
- City: Poznań
- Dates: 8–14 July 2002
- Teams: 7 (from 1 confederation)

Final positions
- Champions: Scotland
- Runner-up: Poland
- Third place: France

Tournament statistics
- Matches played: 15
- Goals scored: 87 (5.8 per match)

The first tournament was played from 8 to 14 July 2002 in Poznań, Poland with seven teams participating.

=== Preliminary round ===
==== Pool A ====
Pos	Team	Pld	W	D	L	GF	GA	GD	Pts	Qualification
1	Scotland	2	2	0	0	7	2	+5	6	Semi-finals
2	France	2	1	0	1	8	3	+5	3	Semi-finals
3	Slovenia	2	0	0	2	0	10	−10	0	

Source: Todor66

8 July 2002
10:00

France	6–0	Slovenia

10 July 2002
12:00

Slovenia	0–4	Scotland

11 July 2002
16:00

France	2–3	Scotland

==== Pool B ====
Pos	Team	Pld	W	D	L	GF	GA	GD	Pts	Qualification
1	Poland (H)	3	3	0	0	32	3	+29	9	Semi-finals
2	Sweden	3	2	0	1	9	9	0	6	Semi-finals
3	Croatia	3	1	0	2	3	16	−13	3	
4	Hungary	3	0	0	3	4	20	−16	0	

Source: Todor66
(H) Hosts

8 July 2002
16:00

Sweden	3–0	Croatia

8 July 2002
18:00

Poland	12–2	Hungary

9 July 2002
18:00

Croatia	0–11	Poland

10 July 2002
10:00

Hungary	0–5	Sweden

11 July 2002
10:00

Croatia	3–2	Hungary

11 July 2002
18:00

Poland	9–1	Sweden

=== Fifth to seventh place classification ===
5–7th place semi-final
13 July
Slovenia	1
Hungary	2

Fifth place
14 July
Hungary (a.e.t.)	2
Croatia	1

==== 5–7th place semi-final ====
13 July 2002
09:30

Slovenia	1–2	Hungary

==== Fifth place game ====
14 July 2002
09:30

Hungary	2–1 (a.e.t.)	Croatia

=== First to fourth place classification ===
Semi-finals
13 July
Scotland	5
Sweden	0
13 July
Poland	2
France	1

Final
14 July
Scotland	2
Poland	0
Third place
14 July
Sweden	2
France	6

==== Semi-finals ====
13 July 2002
15:30

Scotland	5–0	Sweden

13 July 2002
18:00

Poland	2–1	France

==== Third place game ====
14 July 2002
14:00

Sweden	2–6	France

==== Final ====
14 July 2002
16:30

Scotland	2–0	Poland

=== Final standings ===
Pos	Team	Qualification
1	Scotland	2003 European Championship
2	Poland (H)	2003 European Championship
3	France	Play-off
4	Sweden	
5	Hungary	
6	Croatia	
7	Slovenia	

(H) Host

== Tournament 2 ==
Tournament 2
Tournament details
- Host country: Ireland
- City: Dublin
- Dates: 8–14 July
- Teams: 8 (from 1 confederation)

Final positions
- Champions: Ireland
- Runner-up: Italy
- Third place: Wales

Tournament statistics
- Matches played: 20
- Goals scored: 109 (5.45 per match)

The second tournament was held in Dublin, Ireland from 8 to 14 July 2002 with eight teams participating.

=== Preliminary round ===
==== Pool A ====
Pos	Team	Pld	W	D	L	GF	GA	GD	Pts	Qualification
1	Austria	3	3	0	0	12	5	+7	9	Semi-finals
2	Wales	3	2	0	1	14	1	+13	6	Semi-finals
3	Gibraltar	3	1	0	2	12	10	+2	3	
4	Greece	3	0	0	3	2	24	−22	0	

Source: Todor66

8 July 2002
09:00

Austria	5–4	Gibraltar

8 July 2002
13:00

Greece	0–10	Wales

9 July 2002
11:00

Austria	1–0	Wales

9 July 2002
13:00

Gibraltar	8–1	Greece

11 July 2002
09:00

Austria	6–1	Greece

11 July 2002
11:00

Gibraltar	0–4	Wales

==== Pool B ====
Pos	Team	Pld	W	D	L	GF	GA	GD	Pts	Qualification
1	Ireland (H)	3	3	0	0	28	0	+28	9	Semi-finals
2	Italy	3	2	0	1	14	4	+10	6	Semi-finals
3	Finland	3	1	0	2	3	19	−16	3	
4	Malta	3	0	0	3	0	22	−22	0	

Source: Todor66
(H) Hosts

8 July 2002
11:00

Finland	0–8	Italy

8 July 2002
17:00

Malta	0–13	Ireland

9 July 2002
17:00

Finland	3–0	Malta

9 July 2002
19:00

Ireland	4–0	Italy

11 July 2002
17:00

Ireland	11–0	Finland

11 July 2002
17:00

Italy	6–0	Malta

=== Fifth to eighth place classification ===
5–8th place semi-finals
13 July
Gibraltar (a.e.t.)	3
Malta	2
13 July
Finland	0
Greece (a.e.t.)	1

Fifth place
14 July
Gibraltar	1
Greece	0
Seventh place
14 July
Malta	0
Finland	2

==== 5–8th place semi-finals ====
13 July 2002
16:30

Gibraltar	3–2 (a.e.t.)	Malta

13 July 2002
16:30

Finland	0–1 (a.e.t.)	Greece

==== Seventh place game ====
14 July 2002
16:30

Malta	0–2	Finland

==== Fifth place game ====
14 July 2002
16:30

Gibraltar	1–0	Greece

=== First to fourth place classification ===
Semi-finals
13 July
Wales	0
Ireland	1
13 July
Austria	1
Italy	2

Final
14 July
Ireland	3
Italy	2
Third place
14 July
Wales	4
Austria	2

==== Semi-finals ====
13 July 2002
11:30

Wales	0–1	Ireland

13 July 2002
11:30

Austria	1–2	Italy

==== Third place game ====
14 July 2002
11:30

Wales	4–2	Austria

==== Final ====
14 July 2002
14:00

Ireland	3–2	Italy

=== Final standings ===
Pos	Team	Qualification
1	Ireland (H)	2003 European Championship
2	Italy	2003 European Championship
3	Wales	Play-off
4	Austria	
5	Gibraltar	
6	Greece	
7	Finland	
8	Malta	

(H) Host.

== Tournament 3 ==
Tournament 3
Tournament details
- Host country: Russia
- City: Moscow
- Dates: 8–14 July 2002
- Teams: 6 (from 1 confederation)

Final positions
- Champions: Russia
- Runner-up: Switzerland
- Third place: Czech Republic

Tournament statistics
- Matches played: 15
- Goals scored: 77 (5.13 per match)

The third tournament was held in Moscow, Russia from 8 to 14 July 2002 with six teams participating.

=== Standings ===
Pos	Team	Pld	W	D	L	GF	GA	GD	Pts	Qualification
1	Russia (H)	5	4	1	0	16	6	+10	13	2003 European Championship
2	Switzerland	5	4	0	1	12	5	+7	12	2003 European Championship
3	Czech Republic	5	3	0	2	15	13	+2	9	Play-off
4	Belarus	5	2	1	2	11	9	+2	7	
5	Ukraine	5	1	0	4	10	18	−8	3	
6	Portugal	5	0	0	5	7	20	−13	0	

Source: Todor66
(H) Hosts

=== Results ===
8 July 2002

Switzerland	4–1	Ukraine

8 July 2002

Russia	4–2	Portugal

8 July 2002

Czech Republic	3–1	Belarus

9 July 2002

Switzerland	4–1	Czech Republic

9 July 2002

Belarus	4–1	Portugal

9 July 2002

Russia	5–1	Ukraine

11 July 2002

Czech Republic	3–2	Ukraine

11 July 2002

Switzerland	2–1	Portugal

11 July 2002

Russia	1–1	Belarus

13 July 2002

Ukraine	4–2	Portugal

13 July 2002

Switzerland	2–1	Belarus

13 July 2002

Russia	5–2	Czech Republic

14 July 2002

Belarus	4–2	Ukraine

14 July 2002

Czech Republic	6–1	Portugal

14 July 2002

Russia	1–0	Switzerland

== Play-off ==
Play-off
Tournament details
- Host country: Spain
- City: Terrassa
- Dates: 13–15 September 2002
- Teams: 3 (from 1 confederation)

Final positions
- Champions: France
- Runner-up: Wales
- Third place: Czech Republic

Tournament statistics
- Matches played: 3
- Goals scored: 17 (5.67 per match)

The play-off tournament was held in Terrassa, Spain from 13 to 15 September 2002 with three teams participating.

=== Standings ===
Pos	Team	Pld	W	D	L	GF	GA	GD	Pts	Qualification
1	France	2	2	0	0	10	1	+9	6	2003 European Championship
2	Wales	2	1	0	1	5	5	0	3	
3	Czech Republic	2	0	0	2	2	11	−9	0	

Source: Todor66

=== Results ===
13 September 2002

France	3–1	Wales

14 September 2002

Czech Republic	0–7	France

15 September 2002

Wales	4–2	Czech Republic
