= Richard Oliver (field hockey) =

British hockey player

Personal information
- Born: 25 September 1944 (age 81) Haryana, India
- Height: 175 cm (5 ft 9 in)
- Weight: 76 kg (168 lb)

Sport
- Sport: Field hockey
Senior career
Years	Team	Caps	Goals
1964–1966	Oxford University	-	-
1967–1973	Hounslow	-	-
National team
Years	Team	Caps	Goals
–	England & Great Britain		-

Richard Michael Oliver (born 25 September 1944) is a British former field hockey player who competed at the 1968 Summer Olympics and the 1972 Summer Olympics.

== Biography ==
Oliver gained a blue when playing for the hockey club during his time studying geography at the University of Oxford and was selected for the England U23 team in 1964.

Oliver played club hockey for Hounslow Hockey Club and while at the club represented Great Britain at the 1968 Olympic Games in Mexico City and was again a member of the Great Britain team at the 1972 Olympic Games in Munich.
