= Sean Rowlands =

British field hockey player

Personal information
- Born: 12 September 1966 (age 59) London, England
- Height: 188 cm (6 ft 2 in)
- Weight: 92 kg (203 lb)

Sport
- Sport: Field hockey
- Position: Goalkeeper
Senior career
| Years | Team | Caps | Goals |
| 1985–1986 | Lewes | - | - |
| 1986–1988 | Leicester Westleigh | - | - |
| 1988–1995 | Havant | - | - |
National team
| Years | Team | Caps | Goals |
| – | Great Britain | | - |
| – | England | | - |
Medal record
Men's field hockey
Representing England
European Championship
| Bronze medal – third place | 1991 Paris | Team |

Sean Anthony Rowlands (born 12 September 1966) is a British former field hockey player who competed in the 1992 Summer Olympics.

== Biography ==
Rowlands studied at Durham University and represented England Under 21's at field hockey while still an undergraduate.

He played club hockey for Lewes and then Leicester Westleigh, with the latter making his Great Britain debut at the six nations tournament in Barcelona in January 1988. Later that year, Rowlands joined Havant in the Men's England Hockey League for the 1988/89 season.

While at Havant, he represented England at the 1990 Men's Hockey World Cup and Great Britain at the 1992 Olympic Games in Barcelona.

Rowlands won three league titles with Havant in 1990/91, 1991/92 and 1993/94, before he retired after the 1995 season.
