= Joanne Mould =

British field hockey player

Joanne "Jo" Mould (born 21 July 1970) is a British former field hockey player who competed in the 1996 Summer Olympics. She now works at Leicester Grammar School. She teaches the Prep.
