= Malcolm Wilkinson =

British field hockey player

Personal information
- Born: November 1953 (age 72) Merseyside, England

Sport
- Sport: Field hockey
- Position: Forward
Senior career
Years	Team	Caps	Goals
1972–1989	Neston	-	-
National team
Years	Team	Caps	Goals
–	England & Great Britain		-

Malcolm Derek Wilkinson (born November 1953) is a former British hockey international.

== Biography ==
Wilkinson was educated at Calday Grange Grammar School and played club hockey for Neston Hockey Club in the Men's England Hockey League, where he would later captain the club from 1985 to 1986.

He represented Cheshire at county level and would captain the county from 1978.

In January 1979 he was called up to the full England squad, having previously playing for the England schoolboys and England juniors. He helped Neston win the Rank Xerox National Clubs Championship during the 1982–83 England Hockey League season.

While at Neston he was selected by England for the 1981 Men's Hockey Champions Trophy and for the 1982 Men's Hockey World Cup in Bombay.

He retired from competitive hockey in 1989.

In 2003, he was appointed as head coach for the women's team at Worcester Hockey Club.
