= Bobby Crutchley =

English field hockey player and coach

Personal information
- Born: 24 May 1970 (age 56) Wirral Peninsula, England

Sport
- Sport: Field hockey
Senior career
Years	Team	Caps	Goals
1986–1992	Neston	-	-
1992–1995	Hounslow	-	-
1995	Canberra Lakers	-	-
1995–1999	Cannock	-	-
1999–2006	Team Bath Buccaneers	-	-
National team
Years	Team	Caps	Goals
–	GB & England	80	-
Medal record
field hockey
Representing England
Commonwealth Games
Bronze medal – third place	1998 Kuala Lumpur	Team

Robert Crutchley (born 24 May 1970) is the Performance Director for Great Britain and England Hockey. He was previously the Head of Performance Coaching at British Gymnastics (2018-2025) and former male Great Britain and England field hockey coach & player. He was the Head Coach of the Great Britain team at the 2016 Summer Olympics.

== Biography ==
=== Playing career ===
Crutchley was born in the Wirral Peninsula, England and was educated at Calday Grange Grammar School. Crutchley played club hockey for Neston in the Men's England Hockey League and became part of the England U18 and U21 set ups before gaining full senior honours with the club. At the beginning of the 1992–-93 season Crutchley signed for Hounslow.

While at Hounslow he played for England at the 1994 Men's Hockey World Cup. Crutchley starred in the 1994 World Cup in Australia and this led to him playing in Australia during 1995.

After his Australian adventure he joined Cannock for the 1995–96 season. While at Cannock, he represented England at the 1998 Commonwealth Games in Kuala Lumpur, where he won a bronze medal in the men's hockey.

Crutchley announced his international retirement after winning 80 international caps for Great Britain and England. He took up a coaching position at Bath University.

=== Coaching career ===
He was Assistant Coach for the England & Great Britain men's teams from 2005 to 2012 and Head Coach from 2013 to 2018. During this time he coached at 3 Olympic Games, 3 World Cups, 7 European Championships and 4 Commonwealth Games.

He was appointed Performance Coach Developer (later becoming Head of Performance Coaching) at British Gymnastics from 2018 until 2025. In 2025, he then took the role of Performance Director for Great Britain and England and Hockey.
