= Rob Hill (field hockey) =

British field hockey player

Personal information
- Born: 11 June 1967 (age 59) Maidstone, England
- Height: 182 cm (6 ft 0 in)
- Weight: 84 kg (185 lb)

Sport
- Sport: Field hockey
Senior career
Years	Team	Caps	Goals
1989–1992	Havant	-	-
1992–1993	Firebrands	-	-
1993–1994	Havant	-	-
National team
Years	Team	Caps	Goals
–	Great Britain		-
–	England		-

Robert William Hill (born 11 June 1967) is a British former field hockey player who competed in the 1992 Summer Olympics.

== Biography ==
Hill attended Millfield from 1981 to 1986 and became a farmer by trade.

For the 1989/90 season he signed for Havant Hockey Club. While at Havant, he represented England at the 1990 Men's Hockey World Cup and represented Great Britain at the 1992 Olympic Games in Barcelona.

After the Olympics, he joined Bristol hockey club Firebrands for one season before rejoining Havant the following season. He retired from playing hockey in 1994 to concentrate on his agricultural business.

In 2013, Hill joined Eastbourne College as Director of Hockey.
