= Hounslow Hockey Club =

Former English field hockey team

- Full name: Hounslow Hockey Club
- Founded: 1901
- Dissolved: 2005
- Home ground: Church Meadow, Hounslow West (1923-1993); Duke's Meadow, Chiswick (1993-2005)

Hounslow Hockey Club was a field hockey club based at Duke's Meadows, Chiswick, West London and was formed in 1901, initially playing at a variety of locations in the Hounslow Area until becoming a section of Hounslow Cricket and Sports Club, sited at Church Meadow in Hounslow West, circa 1923. The men's team were champions of England on two occasions (1989–90 and 1992–93).

== History ==
The Ladies Hockey club formally became a member of Hounslow Cricket and Sports Club in 1925. In 1936, the club merged with the Brondesbury Club, enabling access to fixtures with the leading teams in the sport. The resulting Hounslow and Brondesbury continued playing, with great success, until being disbanded during World War 2. The club restarted in 1945-46 as Hounslow Hockey Club, continuing to be based at Church Meadow until 1993, when the Club separated from Hounslow Cricket and Sports Club and relocated to Duke's Meadow, where a purpose built water based synthetic pitch had been constructed.

During the period from the late 1950s onwards the men's section became one of the premier hockey clubs in the country, with much success in the London League and subsequently, following its formation, in the National League.

Hounslow's mens 1st XI won the Hockey Association Cup for the third time during the 1988–89 England Hockey League season and became league champions for the first time the following season during 1989-90.

The move to Duke's Meadow provided access to a first class pitch and the success of the men's 1st XI continued into the mid-nineties. However, during this period membership numbers of both men's and women's sections declined. Retirement of many key members of the men's 1st XI, who could not be easily replaced, resulted in relegation through the leagues and loss of status, reinforcing the difficulty in recruiting new members.

In 2000-2001 season the club merged with Ealing Ladies Hockey Club to form Hounslow and Ealing Ladies Hockey Club but this failed to stem the gradual decline of the club. In 2005, the club went out of existence, with the men's section joining Richmond Hockey Club and the women's section merging with Barnes Hockey Club, playing for a period under the name of Barnes Hounslow and Ealing, before reverting to simply Barnes Hockey Club.

== Major Honours ==
The club was hugely successful and gained significant honours -

- 1971-72 Cup winners
- 1972-73 Cup winners
- 1975 National Indoor Club Champions
- 1978 National Indoor Club Champions
- 1988-89 Cup winners
- 1989-90 Inaugural winners of European Cup Winners Cup
- 1989-90 League Champions
- 1989 National League Cup
- 1989 Heineken Trophy winners
- 1990 Heineken Trophy winners
- 1991 National League Cup
- 1990-91 Cup winners
- 1991-92 Cup winners
- 1992-93 League Champions
- 1992-93 Cup winners
- 1994 National League Cup

== Notable players ==
=== Men's internationals ===
Extended content

Player	Events/Notes	Ref
(Wales) W.K.Abdo		
(Scotland) J.Balmer		
(England) D.Barker		
(England) I.S.Barrett		
(England) J.Barrow		
(England) Kulbir Bhaura	Oly (1984), WC (1982, 1986)	
(England) Roly Brookeman	1975–1976	
(England) Paul Bolland	Oly (1992), WC (1990)	
(England) J.K.Bunnell		
(Wales) Robert Cattrall	CT (1984)	
(England) Robert Clift	WC (1986)	
(England) J.V.Conroy		
(England) Mike Corby	Oly (1964, 1972)	
(England) Bobby Crutchley	WC (1994)	
(England) A.N.Diamond		
(England) S.D.Dickins		
(England) G.J.Evans		
(South Africa) S.Evans		
(Scotland) Peter .J.Ewles		
(England) Gavin Featherstone		
(England) M.D.Featherstone		
(England) A.M.Ferns		
(England) Guy Fordham	CG (1998)	
(Wales) O.Griffiths-Jones		
(Wales) S.N.Griffiths		
(England) Martyn Grimley	Oly (1988), WC (1990)	
(England) J.H.Grimmer		
(England) N.V.Gordon		
(England) D.J.Hacker		
(Republic of Ireland) P.M.Hardy		
(England) Simon Hazlitt	Oly (1996), WC (1994)	
(England) T.R.G.Hill		
(New Zealand) S.Hobson		
(Wales) P.M.Howells		
(Wales) Z.D.Jones		
(Sri Lanka) S.Jumar		
(Wales) M.J.Kirkland		
(England) M.R.Kittrell		
(Wales) D.Knapp		
(Wales) A.D.Lewis		
(England) Chris Langhorne	Oly (1964, 1972)	
(Wales) E.Mackney		
(Republic of Ireland) W.E.F.Martin		
(Republic of Ireland) D.L.McManus		
(England) Peter Mills		
(New Zealand) B.Miskimmin		
(New Zealand) P.Miskimmin		
(England) Richard Oliver	Oly (1968, 1972)	
(Scotland) Veryan Pappin	Oly (1988)	
(England) Jon Potter	Oly (1984, 1988, 1992), WC (1986, 1990, 1994)	
(England) Mark Precious	Oly (1984), WC (1982)	
(Wales) J.Rees		
(Wales) S.J.Rees		
(England) F.H.Scott		
(Kenya) H.S.Sibia		
(Republic of Ireland) I.S.Steepe		
(England) G.E.B.Swayne		
(Wales) J.F.Thomas		
(Wales) David Thomas	Oly (1956)	
(England) Ian Thomson	WC (1975, 1978)	
(England) Rob Thompson	Oly (1992)	
(England) J.B.Watson		
(Wales) D.L.Williams		
(Wales) M.Williamson		
(Wales) D.F.C.Woodcock		
(Netherlands) F.Zweerts		

Key

- Oly = Olympic Games
- CG = Commonwealth Games
- WC = World Cup
- CT = Champions Trophy
- EC = European Championships
