= David Ralph =

Scottish field hockey player and coach

Personal information
- Born: 17 August 1972 (age 53) Glasgow, Scotland

Sport
- Sport: Field hockey
- Position: Forward
Senior career
Years	Team	Caps	Goals
1994–	Kelburne	-	-
–	Loughborough Students	-	-
National team
Years	Team	Caps	Goals
–	Scotland		-

David Ralph (born 17 August 1972) is a former international hockey player who played as a forward for Scotland.

== Biography ==
Ralph earned his first Scotland cap in 1994.

Ralph played club hockey for Kelburne in the Scottish leagues and Loughborough Students' Hockey Club in the Men's England Hockey League.

Ralph was part of the Scotland Commonwealth Games team at the 2006 Commonwealth Games in Melbourne.

Ralph, an experienced international hockey coach was appointed Head Coach for the England and Great Britain women's hockey teams in September 2021. He has previously been Assistant Head Coach for the England women's national field hockey team and Great Britain women's national field hockey team and the England men's national field hockey team and Great Britain men's national field hockey team.

His first coaching position was held at Brentwood Hockey Club, Essex before moving onto become head coach for Loughborough Students.

In 2013, he left Loughborough at the same time as fellow coach Jon Bleby as the pair took appointments with England Hockey as an assistant coaches. They were replaced by Jerome Goudie.
