= Steve Taylor (field hockey) =

British field hockey player

Personal information
- Born: May 1960 (age 66) Kidderminster, England

Sport
- Sport: Field hockey
- Position: Goalkeeper
Senior career
Years	Team	Caps	Goals
1976–1995	Stourport	-	-
National team
Years	Team	Caps	Goals
–	GB		-
–	England		-
Medal record
Men's field hockey
Representing England
European Championship
Silver medal – second place	1987 Moscow	Team

Stephen Donald Taylor (born May 1960) is a British former field hockey player who played for GB and England.

== Biography ==
Taylor was born in Kidderminster and played hockey in the position of goalkeeper. He began his hockey career at Stourport Hockey Club, representing them at U16 level. He progressed to the Stourport first team and became an England U21 international, in addition to representing Worcestershire at county level

In February 1985, Taylor was selected for the England men's training squad at Bisham Abbey that remarkably contained three goalkeepers with the surname Taylor. The others being Nick Taylor and Ian Taylor. Later in 1985, Taylor was capped for England against Malaysia but he did not appear again until 1987, after being called up for the 1987 Men's EuroHockey Nations Championship in Moscow.

Still at Stourport, he became the club captain in January 1989, a role he would continue to serve until 1995. He represented England at the 1990 Men's Hockey World Cup, He would captain the club from 1988 to 1995.

In October 1995, Stourport received a Lottery grant and this signalled the retirement of three of their players, including Taylor.

Taylor would however continue to be involved with the club, coaching, managing and later becoming club chairman. As of 2025, he was still heavily involved behind the scenes and is the managing director of the Stourport Sports Club, which includes the hockey facilities.
