= Russell Garcia (field hockey) =

British field hockey player

Personal information
- Born: 20 June 1970 (age 56) Portsmouth, Hampshire, England
- Height: 175 cm (5 ft 9 in)
- Weight: 79 kg (174 lb)

Sport
- Sport: Field hockey
Senior career
| Years | Team | Caps | Goals |
| 1987–1993 | Havant | - | - |
| 1993–1996 | Barcelona | - | - |
| 1996–1998 | HDM | - | - |
| 1998–2000 | Harvestehuder THC | - | - |
National team
| Years | Team | Caps | Goals |
| 1988–2000 | England & Great Britain | 307 | - |
Medal record
Men's field hockey
Representing Great Britain
Olympic Games
| Gold medal – first place | 1988 Seoul | Team competition |
Representing England
Commonwealth Games
| Bronze medal – third place | 1998 Kuala Lumpur | Team competition |
European Championship
| Bronze medal – third place | 1991 Paris | Team |
| Bronze medal – third place | 1995 Dublin | Team |
| Bronze medal – third place | 1999 Padua | Team |

Russell Simon Garcia (born 20 June 1970) is an English field hockey coach and a former England & GB field hockey player. He won a gold medal with Great Britain at the 1988 Summer Olympics in Seoul at the age of 18 years 3 months, making him Britain's youngest ever Olympic champion. Garcia also competed in the 1992 Summer Olympics and 1996 Summer Olympics.

== Biography ==
Garcia was born in Portsmouth, England. He played club hockey for Havant in the Men's England Hockey League and played international hockey from 1988 to 2000 and was awarded his first cap aged 17. While at Havant he won his Olympic Gold medal in 1988, played in the 1990 Men's Hockey World Cup and went to his second Olympics in 1992.

Between 1993 and 1996 he was player coach at Real Club de Polo de Barcelona. Between the ages of 23-26 he took his Spanish club team to two European Cup Winners tournaments, 1995 winning a bronze medal in Italy, and three cup finals (Copa del Rey). After his third Olympics Garcia switched from Spain to the Netherlands to play for Haagsche Delftsche Mixed, a Dutch field hockey club based in The Hague. During his time in the Netherlands he coached the youth under 18 boys team of Leiden to the national field playoffs and becoming national indoor champions.

While at HDM, he represented England and won a bronze medal in the men's hockey, at the 1998 Commonwealth Games in Kuala Lumpur and participated in the 1998 Men's Hockey World Cup.

Between 1998 and 2000 he played in Germany, where he won two league titles and one cup winners medal with Harvestehuder THC. Also in 1998 he was nominated by the International Hockey Federation for World Best Player of the Year.

He was invited back into the British team in January 2004 to try and strengthen the squad preparing for the 2004 Summer Olympics, being cut in the final selection period. At international retirement he had played 307 games ( arecord at the time) and scored more than 70 goals for England and Great Britain. His 307 caps record was surpassed by Barry Middleton during 2014.

Garcia was appointed Head Coach of HC Bloemendaal in Netherlands between June 2012 and 2016. Bloemendaal won the European Hockey League in 2013 and came second in the Hoofdklasse in 2014. In July 2016 he was appointed Head Coach of Der Club an der Alster, Hamburg, Germany.

At International level Garcia was head coach of the Scotland men's national field hockey team between 2008 and 2011. He also worked as assistant coach for the Netherlands, Germany, England and Great Britain. In 2018 Garcia helped England to 4th place at the World Cup in Bhubaneswar.
