= Havant Hockey Club =

English field hockey team

- League: Men's England Hockey League; Women's South League
- Founded: 1907; 118 years ago
- Home ground: Havant Park

Havant Hockey Club is a field hockey club based in Havant, Hampshire, England. The club was established in 1907.

The men's 1st XI play in the National Men's Division One South. The club fields men's teams and ladies' teams as well as a junior section teams. Many of the club's players have gone on to earn international caps at both senior and junior level. The men's team have been champions of England on three occasions (1990–91, 1992–92, 1993–94).

== History ==
Havant Hockey Club came into existence in 1907. The club took to the field at least two seasons earlier, and therefore 2004/5 was the club's centenary season. The home ground, Havant Park, was originally named The Recreation Ground, and in 1905, the club were tenants of an almost new pavilion, which they shared with Havant Cricket Club, Havant Rovers F.C, The Lawn Tennis Club, Athletics, and Bowls.

From the 1950s the club fielded five sides and other grounds had to be found. A ladies section was formed in the early 50s and a mixed hockey team in the mid 60s. The 1960s and 70s saw a large expansion of the club.

Havant won their first National League title in 1974. The club contributed several players to the British Olympic gold medal-winning side of 1988. In the 1990s Havant became one of the best known clubs in the country, when they were National League Champions again, three times in four years, hosting the B Division of the European Cup, and representing England in the European Cup A Division twice in Spain, and once in the Netherlands. Mini hockey was introduced to Havant one of the first clubs to do so in England.

In 1998 the club installed a Water-Based astroturf pitch at Havant College that met FIH international standards, and funding was aided by the National Lottery Fund.

Havant also achieved success from 2005-2008 when the club won back-to-back league titles, and once again found themselves competing in the England Hockey League Men's Premier Division. In the Men's National South Division 2005/2006 they scored 116 goals, in the Men's Division One 2006/2007 they scored 90, and in the Men's Premier Division 2007/2008 they scored 73.

In the 2018/2019 season, Havant were crowned champions of the National Conference West but unfortunately missed out on promotion to the England Hockey League Men's Premier Division via the playoffs.

== Honours ==
Men's England Hockey League

- Winners (3): 1990-91, 1991–92, 1993–94
- Runners-up (1): 1988-89

England Hockey Men's Championship Cup

- Winners (1): 1989-90
- Runners-up (1): 1990-91

Men's EuroHockey Club Trophy I

- Winners (1): 1993

== Notable players ==
=== Men's internationals ===
Extended content

Player	Events/Notes	Ref
(England) Calum Giles	Oly (1996)	
(England) David Faulkner	Oly (1988), WC (1986, 1990)	
(England) Russell Garcia	Oly (1988, 1992), WC (1990)	
(England) Rob Hill	Oly (1992), WC (1990)	
(England) Jimi Lewis	England debut 1994	
(South Africa) Thornton McDade		
(England) Rob Moore		
(England) Sean Rowlands	Oly (1992), WC (1990)	
(India) Sandeep Singh		
(England) Donald Williams	Oly (1992), WC (1994)	

Key

- Oly = Olympic Games
- CG = Commonwealth Games
- WC = World Cup
- CT = Champions Trophy
- EC = European Championships
