= Christopher Langhorne =

British field hockey player

Chris Langhorne
Personal information
- Born: 18 September 1940 (age 85) Hammersmith, London, England
- Height: 170 cm (5 ft 7 in)
- Weight: 66 kg (146 lb)

Sport
- Sport: Field hockey
- Position: midfield/forward
Senior career
Years	Team	Caps	Goals
1962–1976	Hounslow	-	-
National team
Years	Team	Caps	Goals
–	England & Great Britain		-

Christopher John Langhorne (born 18 September 1940) is a British field hockey player. He competed at the 1964 Summer Olympics and the 1972 Summer Olympics.

== Biography ==
Lenghorne was a competent cricketer and topped the 1963 Shepherds Bush CC batting averages. In field hockey he represented Middlesex at county level.

Langhorne played club hockey for Hounslow Hockey Club and while at the club represented Great Britain at the 1964 Olympic Games in Tokyo and was again a member of the Great Britain team at the 1972 Olympic Games in Munich.

He coached the England team at the 1975 Men's Hockey World Cup.
