= Donald Williams (field hockey) =

British field hockey player (born 1966)

Personal information
- Born: 11 September 1966 (age 59) Altrincham, England
- Height: 185 cm (6 ft 1 in)
- Weight: 86 kg (190 lb)

Sport
- Sport: Field hockey
Senior career
Years	Team	Caps	Goals
1989–1994	Havant	-	-
National team
Years	Team	Caps	Goals
–	Great Britain		-
–	England		-
Medal record
Men's field hockey
Representing England
European Championship
Bronze medal – third place	1991 Paris	Team

Donald Scott Williams (born 11 September 1966) is a British former field hockey player who competed in the 1992 Summer Olympics.

== Biography ==
Williams played club hockey for Havant Hockey Club in the Men's England Hockey League from 1989 and made his Great Britain debut during the June 1990 BMW Trophy tournament in Amsterdam.

Still at Havant, he represented Great Britain at the 1992 Olympic Games in Barcelona and participated in the 1994 Men's Hockey World Cup.
