= Simon Hazlitt =

British field hockey player

Personal information
- Born: 16 October 1966 (age 59) Woking, England
- Height: 178 cm (5 ft 10 in)
- Weight: 74 kg (163 lb)

Sport
- Sport: Field hockey
Senior career
Years	Team	Caps	Goals
1986-1987	Leicester Westleigh	-	-
1988–1997	Hounslow	-	-
1997–2000	Winchester	-	-
National team
Years	Team	Caps	Goals
–	England & Great Britain		-
Medal record
Men's field hockey
Representing England
European Championship
Bronze medal – third place	1995 Dublin	Team

Simon Charles Hazlitt (born 16 October 1966) is a British former field hockey player who competed in the 1996 Summer Olympics.

== Biography ==
Hazlitt played club hockey for Hounslow in the Men's England Hockey League having previously played for Leicester Westleigh. While at Hounslow, he represented England at the 1994 Men's Hockey World Cup and Great Britain at the 1996 Olympic Games in Atlanta.

Hazlitt joined Winchester Hockey Club in 1997 and was elected club president in May 2012. He continues to coach Junior players in the club.

He was formerly the information director at Majedie Asset Management and iscurrently is the CEO of Supl Ltd. He is married to Karen and has three children Annabel, Olivia and Freddie and 2 dogs Rosie and Mabel.
