= David Faulkner (field hockey) =

English field hockey player

Personal information
- Born: 10 September 1962 (age 63) Portsmouth, Hampshire, England
- Height: 182 cm (6 ft 0 in)
- Weight: 73 kg (161 lb)

Sport
- Sport: Field hockey
Senior career
Years	Team	Caps	Goals
1984–1986	Guildford	-	-
1986–2000	Havant	-	-
National team
Years	Team	Caps	Goals
–	Great Britain		-
–	England		-
Medal record
Men's field hockey
Representing Great Britain
Olympic Games
Gold medal – first place	1988 Seoul	Team
Champions Trophy
Bronze medal – third place	1984 Karachi	Team
Silver medal – second place	1985 Perth	Team
Representing England
World Cup
Silver medal – second place	1986 London	Team
European Championship
Silver medal – second place	1987 Moscow	Team

David Andrew Vincent Faulkner MBE (born 10 September 1962) is an English former field hockey player who won a gold medal at the 1988 Summer Olympics. He is the current head of women's performance at The FA.

== Biography ==
Faulkner was born in Portsmouth, England and played club hockey for Guildford Hockey Club in the Men's England Hockey League. He made his England and Great Britain debuts with the club and was part of the warm up squad for the 1984 Summer Olympics, although ultimately he did not make the cut for the final 16 players. He did however win the bronze medal with the Great Britain team that competed at the 1984 Men's Hockey Champions Trophy, in Karachi, Pakistan and won the silver medal the following year at the 1985 Men's Hockey Champions Trophy in Perth, Australia.

He moved from Guildford to Havant Hockey Club for the start of the 1986/87 season, where he was made club captain (and much later Director of Hockey). While at Havant, he won silver with the England squad at the 1986 Men's Hockey World Cup, was part of the Great Britain squad that won the gold medal at the 1988 Olympics in Seoul in the hockey tournament and represented England at the 1990 Men's Hockey World Cup.

He was the sport's performance director, working with England Hockey and Great Britain Hockey. His sons, Simon and Daniel, have both represented Great Britain and England at junior level and play club hockey in the Men's England Hockey League.

Faulkner joined The FA in April 2017 as head of women's performance having previously held the position of director of sport at Millfield School

He was appointed Member of the Order of the British Empire (MBE) in the 2021 Birthday Honours for services to sport.
