= David Hacker =

British field hockey player

Personal information
- Born: 25 March 1964 (age 62) Hampshire, England
- Height: 185 cm (6 ft 1 in)
- Weight: 79 kg (174 lb)

Sport
- Sport: Field hockey
- Position: Forward
Senior career
Years	Team	Caps	Goals
1988–1994	Hounslow	-	-
1994–2000	Canterbury	-	-
2000–2002	Firebrands	-	-
National team
Years	Team	Caps	Goals
–	GB		-
–	Wales		-

David John Hacker (born 25 March 1964) is a British former field hockey player who competed in the 2000 Summer Olympics.

== Biography ==
Hacker was born in Hampshire but gained qualification for Wales by virtue of his mother's Welsh ancestry. He played his club hockey for Hounslow in the Men's England Hockey League and by 1987 he was representing Wales at international level. He helped Hounslow win the Hockey Association Cup during the 1988–89 England Hockey League season.

He made his Great Britain debut during the June 1990 BMW Trophy tournament in Amsterdam and in June 1991 became Wales' all-time record scorer.

Hacker took a role as a PE teacher at St Edmund's School Canterbury in September 1990 and then took on a similar role at Millfield. He transferred from Hounslow to Canterbury for the 1994/95 season.

While at Canterbury, he captained and coached Wales in the men's tournament at the 1998 Commonwealth Games in Kuala Lumpur, Malaysia and won the 1998 Hockey Writers' UK Player of the Year. He then represented Great Britain at the 2000 Olympic Games in Sydney in the men's hockey tournament.

Hacker retired from International hockey soon after the Olympics and joined Firebrands as a player coach and helped then win promotion to Division One.
