= Neston Hockey Club =

English field hockey team

Neston Hockey
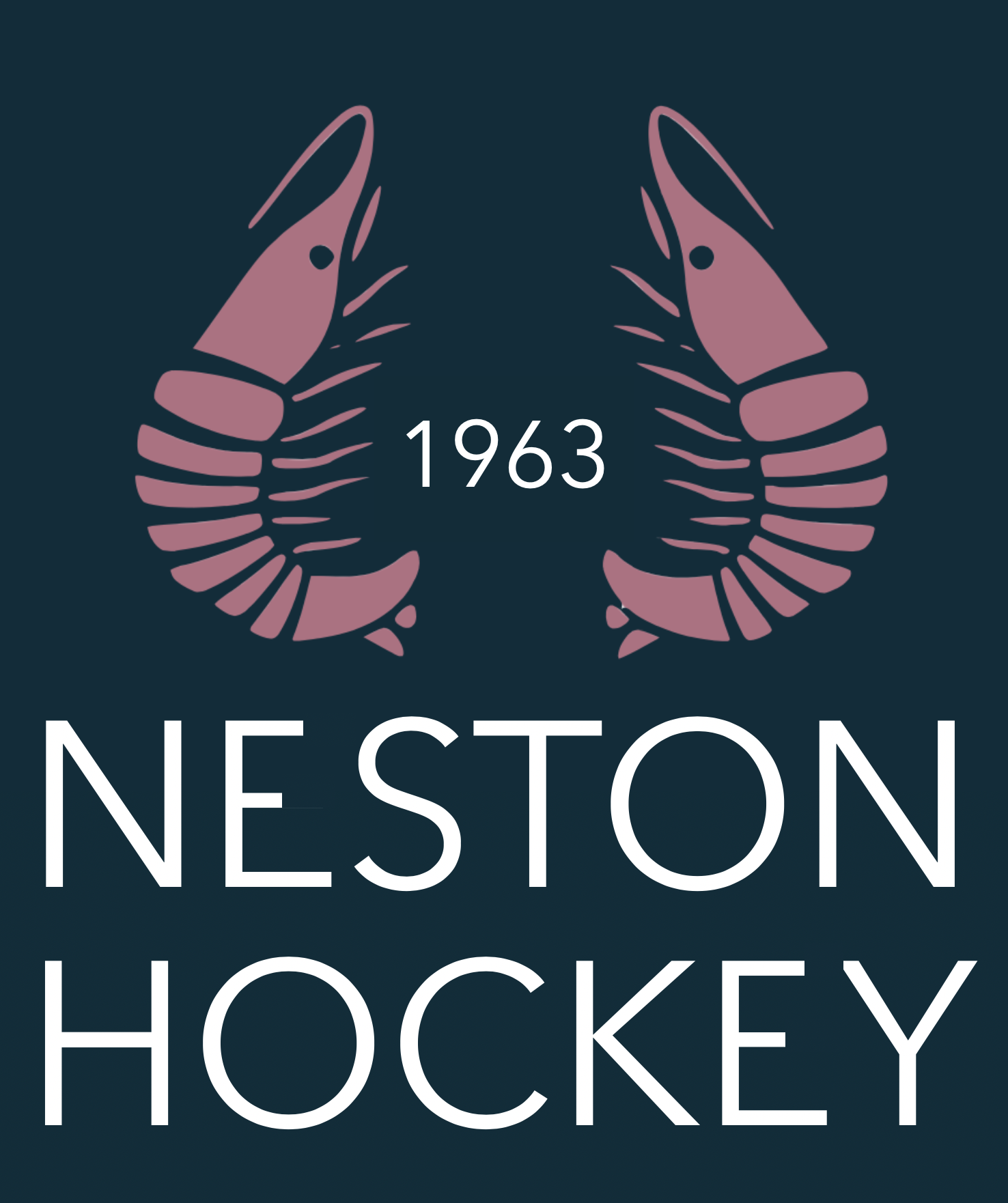
- League: Men's North Hockey League; Women's North Hockey League
- Founded: 1963; 62 years ago
- Home ground: Station Road, Parkgate, South Wirral, Cheshire CH64 6QJ

Neston Hockey Club is a field hockey club that is based at Parkgate in South Wirral, Cheshire. Founded in 1963 the team became National Champions of England in 1984.

== Major National honours ==
- 1978–79 Men's Cup Runner-up
- 1982–83 Men's Cup winners
- 1983–84 Men's League champions
- England Hockey Ladies Hockey Team of the Year 2014

== Teams ==
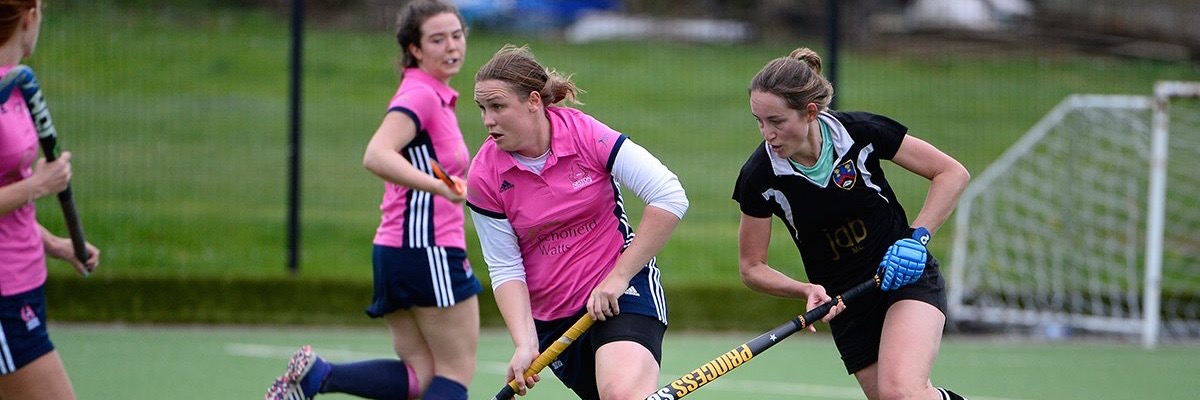
Emma Nokes moves forward.

The club runs eight men's teams and five women's teams and the Mens 1s and Ladies 1s compete in the North Premier Hockey League, as of 2020/21 season.

== The Facilities ==
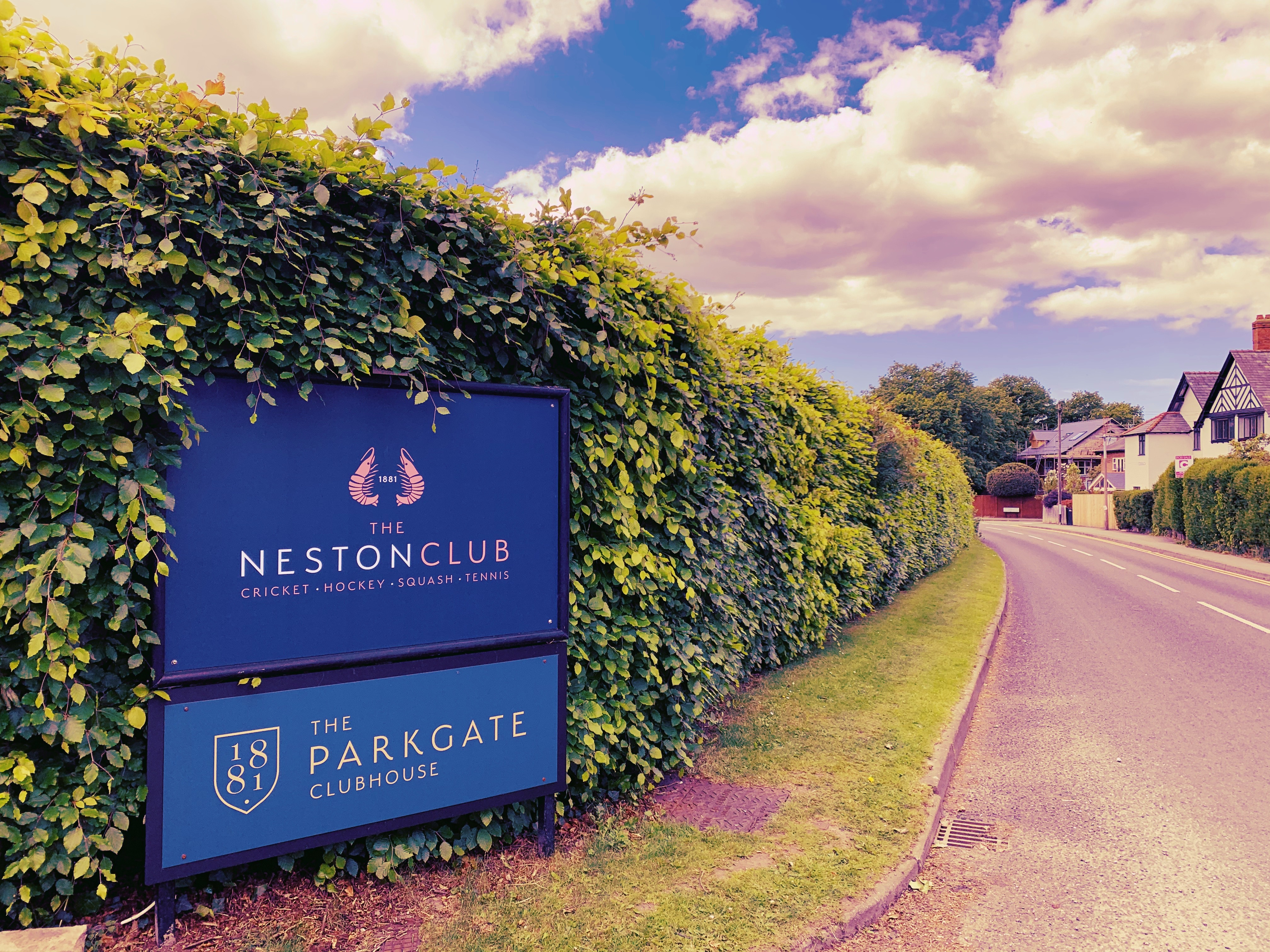
The Neston Club, four sports One Club.

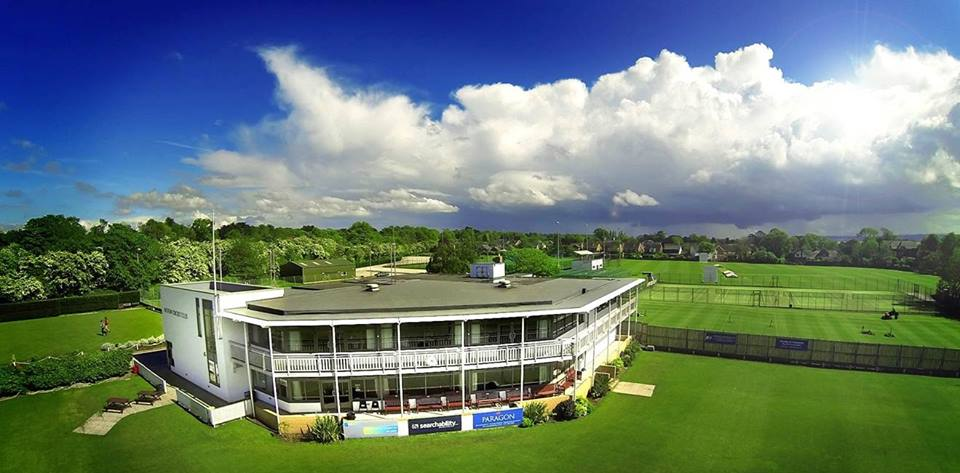

The club also offers 12 tennis courts, two cricket pitches and three squash courts. Three function rooms each with its own bar, the club has a very busy events side to it, The Parkgate Clubhouse hosts weddings, conferences, parties and other events.

== Notable players ==
=== Men's internationals ===
Extended content

Player	Events	Notes/Ref
(England) Chris Ashcroft		
(England) Bobby Crutchley	debut 1992	
(England) David Cutter		
(England) Paul Edwards		
(England) Martyn Grimley		
(England) Donald Hughes		
(England) David Peters		
(England) Justin Pidcock	debut 1992	
(England) Geoff Poole		
(England) Robbie Smith	WC (1978)	
(England) Malcolm Wilkinson	WC (1982), CT (1981)	

Key

- Oly = Olympic Games
- CG = Commonwealth Games
- WC = World Cup
- CT = Champions Trophy
- EC = European Championships

=== Women's internationals ===
Extended content

Player	Events	Notes/Ref
(Wales) Izzie Howell		

Key

- Oly = Olympic Games
- CG = Commonwealth Games
- WC = World Cup
- CT = Champions Trophy
- EC = European Championships
