= St Albans Hockey Club =

British field hockey club

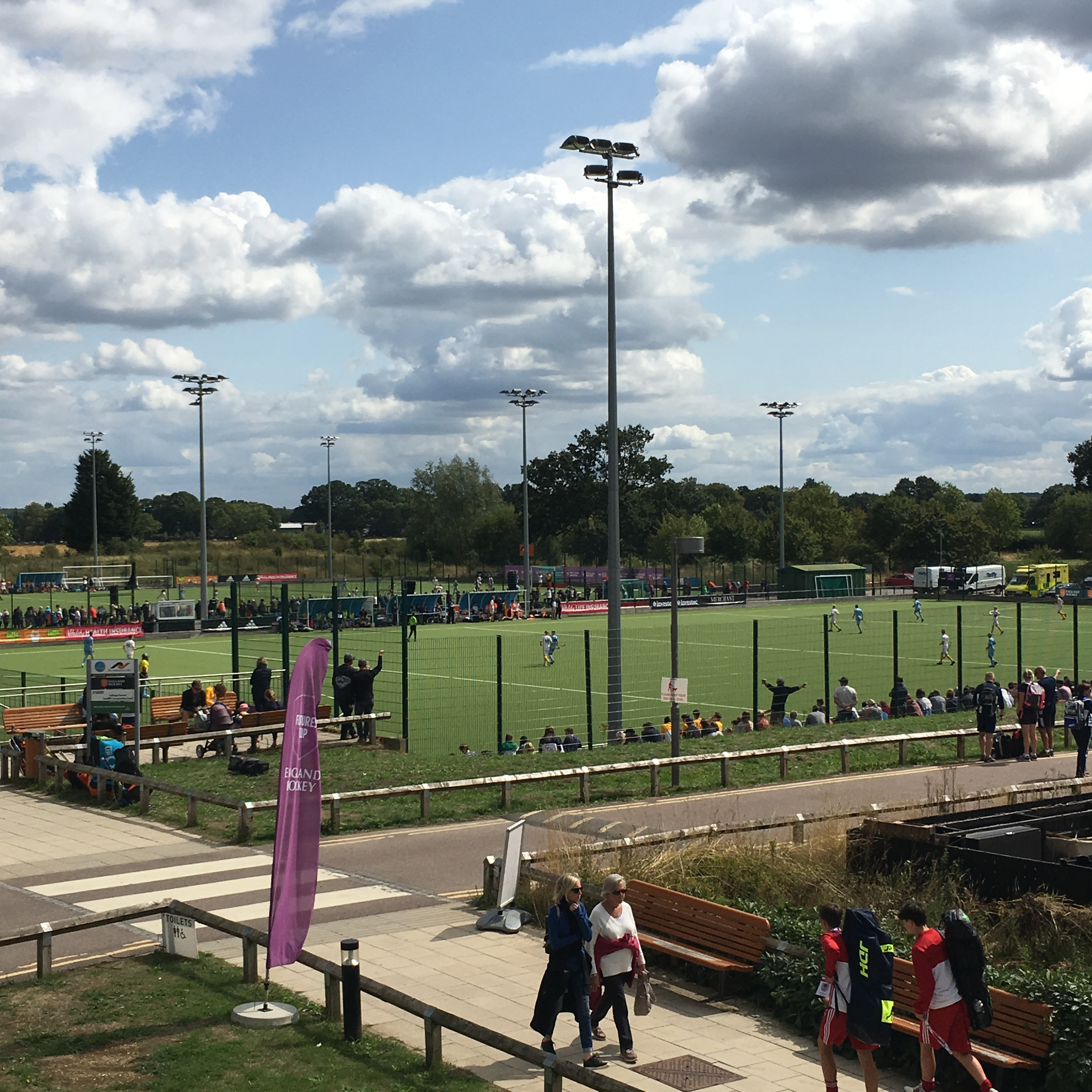
- St Albans HC at Oaklands
- League: Women's England Hockey League; Men's England Hockey League
- Founded: 1898; 127 years ago
- Home ground: Oaklands College, Hatfield Road, St Albans
- Website: www.stalbanshc.co.uk

St Albans Hockey Club is a field hockey club that is based at Oaklands College in Hatfield Road, St Albans, Hertfordshire. The club was founded in 1898.

The club runs twelve men's teams with the first XI playing in the Men's England Hockey League Midlands Conference and eight women's teams with the first XI playing in the Women's England Hockey League Midlands Conference.

== Notable players ==
Former players at the club include two of the team who won gold medals at the Rio 2016 Olympic Games: Ellie Watton, who played for England and Great Britain 2013-18; and Hannah Macleod, who has represented England and Great Britain since 2003. Other former players are John Hurst, who played in goal for England and Great Britain, indoors and out, between 1977 and 1988; and Andy Halliday, the Team Manager of the England / GB Mens Olympic Hockey Team.

=== Men's internationals ===
Extended content

Player	Events/Notes	Ref
(England) John Hurst	WC (1978, 1982, 1986)	
(England) David Westcott	WC (1982), CT (1980, 1981)	

Key

- Oly = Olympic Games
- CG = Commonwealth Games
- WC = World Cup
- CT = Champions Trophy
- EC = European Championship

=== Women's internationals ===
Extended content

Player	Events/Notes	Ref
(England) Hannah Macleod		
(England) Ellie Watton		

Key

- Oly = Olympic Games
- CG = Commonwealth Games
- WC = World Cup
- CT = Champions Trophy
- EC = European Championship
