= Nick Thompson (field hockey) =

British field hockey player

Personal information
- Born: 21 September 1967 (age 58) Hackney, London

Sport
- Sport: Field hockey
- Position: Forward
Senior career
Years	Team	Caps	Goals
1986–2003	Old Loughtonians	-	-
2003–2010	Cannock	-	-
National team
Years	Team	Caps	Goals
–	England & Great Britain	196	(58)
Medal record
Men's field hockey
Representing England
European Championship
Bronze medal – third place	1995 Dublin	Team

Nicholas Thompson (born 21 September 1967) is a British former field hockey player who competed in the 1996 Summer Olympics. He gained 196 caps and scored 58 goals.

== Biography ==
Thompson, born in Hackney, only picked up a hockey stick in 1981 aged 14 but by 1983 was representing the England U16 team.

Thompson played club hockey for Old Loughtonians Hockey Club in the Men's England Hockey League from 1986 and was involved in the Seoul 1988 Olympic training squad. He was selected for the 1990 Men's Hockey World Cup. After missing selection for the 1992 Olympics he was added to the squad for the 1994 Men's Hockey World Cup.

Still at Old Loughtonians he was selected for the 1996 Olympic Games in Atlanta and participated in the 1998 Men's Hockey World Cup.

Thompson left Old Loughtonians to join Cannock and experienced a legue title success during the 2003–04 England Hockey League season and in 2010 would become the England Hockey leagues all–time record scorer with 280 goals.

Thompson coached after finishing his playing career and coached the U21 England U21 squad from 2006 until 2008. In 2010 coached Cambridge City Hockey Club to National League status.
