= Paul Bolland (field hockey) =

British field hockey player

Personal information
- Born: 13 March 1965 (age 61) Weston-super-Mare, England
- Height: 180 cm (5 ft 11 in)
- Weight: 76 kg (168 lb)

Sport
- Sport: Field hockey
Senior career
Years	Team	Caps	Goals
–1986	York	-	-
1986–1988	Leicester Westleigh	-	-
1988–1989	Wakefield	-	-
1989–1998	Hounslow	-	-
1998–2001	St Albans	-	-
National team
Years	Team	Caps	Goals
–	Great Britain		-
–	England		-
Medal record
Men's field hockey
Representing Great Britain
Champions Trophy
Silver medal – second place	1985 Perth	Team competition
Representing England
Hockey World Cup
Silver medal – second place	1986 London	Team competition
European Championship
Silver medal – second place	1987 Moscow	Team

Paul Michael Bolland (born 13 March 1965) is a British former field hockey player who competed at the 1992 Summer Olympics.

== Biography ==
Bolland was born in Weston-super-Mare, England.

Bolland played club hockey for York Hockey Club and represented Yorkshire at county level and while at the club was part of the silver medal winning Great Britain team that competed at the 1985 Men's Hockey Champions Trophy in Perth, Australia and won a silver medal with the England team at the 1986 Men's Hockey World Cup in London.

Bolland signed to play for Leicester Westleigh Hockey Club and then Wakefield Hockey Club before joining Hounslow Hockey Club in the Men's England Hockey League from the 1989/90 season.

At Hounslow, he represented England at the 1990 Men's Hockey World Cup and competed with the Great Britain squad in the men's tournament at the 1992 Summer Olympics in Barcelona.

Bolland continued to play for Hounslow for another six seasons and became the club captain. He moved to St Albans Hockey Club in October 1998.
