= Stourport Hockey Club =

Field hockey club in Worcestershire

- Full name: Stourport Hockey Club
- League: Women's England Hockey League; Midland Men's Hockey League
- Colors: Blue and Gold
- Home ground: Stourport Sports Club, The Kingsway, Stourport-on-Severn, Worcestershire, DY13 8BQ

Stourport Hockey Club is a field hockey club that is based at the Stourport Sports Club in Stourport-on-Severn in Worcestershire.

== Teams ==
The club runs three women's teams with the first XI playing in the Women's England Hockey League Division One North. The men's section has six men's teams with the first XI playing in Midlands Conference of the England Hockey Men's National League League.

== History ==
In October 1995, Stourport received a Lottery grant and this signalled the retirement of three of their international players, Imran Sherwani, Richard Jones and Steve Taylor.

== Achievements ==
- 1987–88 Men's League Runner-up
- 1989–90 Men's Cup Runner-up

== Notable players ==
=== Men's internationals ===
Extended content

Player	Events/Notes	Ref
(Wales) Richard John	CG (2002)	
(Wales) Matthew Ruxton	2001–2009	
(England) Imran Sherwani	OG (1988)	
(England) Steve Taylor	WC (1990)	
(Wales) Jamie Westerman	CG (2002)	

Key

- Oly = Olympic Games
- CG = Commonwealth Games
- WC = World Cup
- CT = Champions Trophy
- EC = European Championship
