= Firebrands Hockey Club =

English field hockey club

- Full name: Firebrands Hockey Club
- League: West Men's Premier; Women's England Hockey League
- Founded: 1940; 86 years ago
- Home ground: Clevedon Road (Firebrands HC & QEH Sports Ground)
- Website: Official website

Firebrands Hockey Club sometimes called Bristol Firebrands is a field hockey club that is based at Firebrands Hockey Club on Clevedon Road in Failand, Bristol, England. The club was founded in 1940 and took the name Firebrands in 1947. The club runs five men's teams and six women's teams, in addition to various junior teams.

== History ==
The club were founded in 1940 as the Bristol Fire Service Hockey Club, formed by members of the auxiliary fire service and police regulars from the Bristol area. In 1947 the club changed its name to become the Firebrands Hockey Club and from 1947 played on the Portway until 1964.

Firebrands then spent three years at Brook Road in Speedwell until 1967 before moving to the current site in Failand, joining with the Optimists Cricket Club.

In 1985, Harry Iles a founder of the club died and in 1990 councillors refused an application for lighting at the pitch.

Under the player/coaching role of David Hacker the club sealed promotion to the men’s first division during the 1990–91 England Hockey League season and during the 1990s Firebrands played in the Premier League.

In 1995 and at the cost of £65,000 the club installed new changing rooms, a first floor balcony and bar and lounge extensions. Meanwhile in 1996 the women’s teams merged with Portishead Hockey Club.

In 2005 the men's first team played their last Premier Division match after suffering relegation during the 2004–05 England Hockey League season, while the women's team fared better under the coaching of Andy Catchpole, they achieved promotion to the National League.

The women's first XI were promoted to the Division 1 South for the 2024–25 Women's England Hockey League season following a successful campaign winning the Conference West league in 2023/24

== Notable players ==
=== Women's internationals ===
Extended content

| Player | Events/Notes | Ref |
|---|---|---|
| (England) Lily Owsley | CG (2016, 2020) | |

Key

- Oly = Olympic Games
- CG = Commonwealth Games
- WC = World Cup
- CT = Champions Trophy
- EC = European Championships
