= 2024–25 Men's England Hockey League season =

English field hockey season

Men's England Hockey League
- Champions: Surbiton (league); Harborne (cup)

The 2024–25 Men's England Hockey League season is the 2024–25 season of England's field hockey league structure and the England Hockey Men's Championship Cup for men.

The season started on 21 September 2024. Old Georgians were the defending league champions, having won the league for three successive seasons and Beeston would defend the cup.

Surbiton won the league title and Harborne won the Cup.

== Format ==
- Phase 1 - 11 matches per club determining the top six and bottom six clubs for phase 2.
- Phase 2 - 5 additional matches per club determining the top eight and bottom four clubs for phase 3.
- Phase 3 - 3 additional matches per club determining the top four to progress to league finals weekend and the bottom two to be relegated.

== 2024-25 teams ==
=== Premier Division ===
Team	City/town	Home pitch
Beeston	Beeston	Nottingham Hockey Centre
Bowdon	Bowdon	The Bowdon Club
Cardiff & Met	Cardiff	Sophia Gardens
East Grinstead	East Grinstead	East Grinstead Sports Club, Saint Hill Rd
Hampstead & Westminster	Paddington	Paddington Recreation Ground
Holcombe	Rochester	Holcombe Park, Curtis Way
Old Georgians	Addlestone	St George's College
Oxted	Oxted	Caterham School
Richmond	Chiswick	Quintin Hogg Memorial Sports
Southgate	Trent Park	Southgate Hockey Centre
Surbiton	Long Ditton	Surbiton HC, Sugden Road
Wimbledon	Wimbledon	Raynes Park High School

=== Division One South ===
Team	City/town	Home pitch
Canterbury	Canterbury	Polo Farm
Havant	Havant	Havant Park
Indian Gymkhana	Isleworth	Indiana Gymkhana Club, Thornbury Ave
Old Loughtonians	Chigwell	Roding Sports Centre, Luxborough Lane
Reading	Reading	Sonning Lane
Sevenoaks	Sevenoaks	Vine Cricket Ground, Hollybush Lane
Team Bath Buccaneers	Bath	University of Bath
Teddington	Teddington	Teddington School
University of Bristol	Bristol	Coombe Dingle Sports Complex
University of Exeter	Exeter	Streatham Campus

=== Division One North ===
Team	City/town	Home pitch
Brooklands Manchester University	Sale	Brooklands Sports Club
Deeside Ramblers	Tiverton	Whitchurch Road
Durham University	Durham	The Graham Sports Centre
Harborne	Harborne	Eastern Road, King Edward School
Lindum	Lincoln	Lindum Sports Club Ground, St Giles Ave
Loughborough Students	Loughborough	Loughborough University
Olton & West Warwicks	Olton	West Warwickshire Sports Club
Stourport	Stourport-on-Severn	Stourport Sports Club
University of Birmingham	Birmingham	Bournbrook
University of Nottingham	Nottingham	University of Nottingham

== League Tables ==
=== Premier Division ===
Pos	Team	P	W	D	L	Pts	Section
1	Old Georgians	16	15	1	0	46	Top 6-top 8
2	Surbiton	16	12	2	2	38	Top 6-top 8
3	Holcombe	16	10	2	4	32	Top 6-top 8
4	Wimbledon	16	9	4	3	31	Top 6-top 8
5	Hampstead & Westminster	16	7	1	8	22	Top 6-top 8
6	Oxted	16	5	2	9	17	Top 6-top 8
7	Beeston	16	7	4	5	25	Bottom 6-top 8
8	East Grinstead	16	5	4	7	19	Bottom 6-top 8
9	Cardiff & Met	19	7	1	11	22	Bottom 6-bottom 4
10	Southgate	19	5	4	10	19	Bottom 6-bottom 4
11	Bowdon (R)	19	5	1	13	16	Bottom 6-bottom 4
12	Richmond (R)	19	1	2	16	5	Bottom 6-bottom 4

==== Top 8 - Phase 3 ====
Pool A
Pos	Team	Pts
1	Old Georgians	9
2	Wimbledon	6
3	Hampstead & Westminster	3
4	East Grinstead	0

Pool B
Pos	Team	Pts
1	Surbiton	9
2	Oxted	5
3	Holcombe	4
4	Beeston	0

==== Finals weekend ====
All matches were played at the Nottingham Hockey Centre in Nottingham.

Semi-finals
3 May
Old Georgians	4
Oxted	0
3 May
Surbiton	6
Wimbledon	2

Final
4 May
Old Georgians	1
Surbiton	2
Third place
4 May
Oxted	0 (2)
Wimbledon (pen.)	0 (3)

Semi-finals

3 May 2025
11:00

Old Georgians	4–0	Oxted
Roper 7'; Forsyth 23'; Marshall 30'; Proctor 42'	Report

Nottingham Hockey Centre, Nottingham
Umpires:
Nicholas Bennett (ENG)
Sean Edwards (ENG)

3 May 2025
13:15

Surbiton	6–2	Wimbledon
Furlong 13', 40'; Walker 30', 39', 48'; Ja. Gall 49'	Report	Fox 9'; Gilmour 47'

Nottingham Hockey Centre, Nottingham
Umpires:
Daniel Barstow (WAL)
Paul Walker (ENG)

Third and fourth place

4 May 2025
11:00

Oxted	0–0	Wimbledon
	Report
Penalties
Bennett (penalty shoot-out missed); Royden-Turner (penalty shoot-out scored); Axford (penalty shoot-out scored); Porter (penalty shoot-out missed); Finnegan (penalty shoot-out missed)	2–3	(penalty shoot-out missed) Gilmour; (penalty shoot-out scored) Horler; (penalty shoot-out missed) Francis; (penalty shoot-out scored) Scott; (penalty shoot-out scored) Patterson

Nottingham Hockey Centre, Nottingham
Umpires:
Nicholas Bennett (WAL)
Paul Walker (ENG)

Final

4 May 2025
15:30

Old Georgians	1–2	Surbiton
T. Carson 20'	Report	Payton 14'; Walker 42'

Nottingham Hockey Centre, Nottingham
Umpires:
Daniel Barstow (WAL)
Sean Edwards (ENG)

==== Finals squads ====
Old Georgians
- 3. Henry Weir
- 4. Liam Sanford
- 5. David Ames
- 6. Kyle Marshall
- 8. Tom Carson
- 9. James Carson
- 10. Ashley Jackson
- 11. Dan Shingles
- 13. Sam Ward
- 15. Phil Roper
- 16. Edward Carson
- 17. Chris Griffiths
- 18. James Albery (c)
- 19. Chris Proctor
- 21. Thabang Modise
- 22. Matthew Brown
- 23 David Condon
- 24. Ian Sloan
- 27. George Pinner (gk)
- 77. Alan Forsyth
Oxted
- 1. Max Christopher (gk)
- 2. Josiah Wood
- 5. Lucas Ward
- 7. Robert Mugridge
- 8. Matthew Crookshanks
- 9. Thomas Rhodes-Young
- 10. Jack Jamieson
- 13. Josh Nurse
- 14. Chris Porter
- 16. Owen Williamson (c)
- 17. Thomas Finnegan
- 18. Jamie Batten
- 20. Adam Miller
- 21. Peter Jarvis
- 22. Charlie Axford
- 23. Guy Morgan
- 24. Michael Royden-Turner
- 25. Oliver Bennett
- 26. Isaac Dale
- 36. Doug Allison
- 45. Nick Page
Surbiton
- 1. James Mazarelo (gk)
- 3. Luke Taylor
- 4. Rob Farrington
- 5. Max Anderson
- 6. Nick Nurse
- 7. Jonny Gall
- 8. Tim Nurse
- 10 Nick Park
- 11. Jacob Payton
- 12. Ben Park
- 13. Struan Walker
- 14. Louis Gittens
- 15. Barry Middleton
- 16. Jacob Smith
- 17. Stuart Rushmere
- 19. David Goodfield (c)
- 21. Adam Buckle
- 22. William Haspel
- 26. James Gall
- 27. Conor Williamson
- 28. Gareth Furlong
Wimbledon
- 5. Jack Turner
- 6. Fred Newbold
- 7. Duncan Scott
- 8. Evan Kimber
- 9. Rhys Bradshaw
- 10. Rory Patterson
- 11. Ed Horler (c)
- 13. Eddie Way
- 15. Sam Hooper
- 16. James Vallely
- 17. Ben Fox] *18. Euan Gilmour *19. Benjamin Francis (field hockey)|Ben Francis
- 21. Liam Ansell
- 23. Jonathan Lankfer
- 24. Kaden Draysey
- 25. Nathaniel O'Dwyer
- 26. Connor Greentree
- 28. Lewis Wilcher
- 30. Ore Ogunlana (gk)
- 32. Callum Mackenzie

=== Division One South ===
Pos	Team	P	W	D	L	Pts
1	Reading M1s	18	15	1	2	46
2	Indian Gymkhana M1s	18	13	3	2	42
3	Old Loughtonians M1s	18	9	5	4	32
4	Sevenoaks M1s	18	9	2	7	29
5	Teddington M1s	18	8	5	5	29
6	University of Exeter M1s	18	8	1	9	25
7	Havant M1s	18	5	4	9	19
8	Canterbury M1s	18	4	2	12	14
9	Team Bath Buccaneers M1s (R)	18	3	3	12	12
10	University of Bristol M1s (R)	18	3	0	15	9

=== Division One North ===
Pos	Team	P	W	D	L	Pts
1	Brooklands Manchester University M1s	18	15	1	2	46
2	Loughborough Students M1s	18	14	3	1	45
3	University of Nottingham M1s	18	13	0	5	39
4	Harborne M1s	18	7	3	8	24
5	Deeside Ramblers M1s	18	6	3	9	21
6	University of Birmingham M1s	18	6	2	10	20
7	Olton & West Warwicks M1s	18	5	4	9	19
8	Durham University M1s	18	4	7	7	19
9	Lindum M1s (R)	18	3	4	11	13
10	Stourport M1s (R)	18	3	1	14	10

=== Conference East ===
Pos	Team	P	W	D	L	Pts
1	Surbiton M2s	18	11	3	4	36
2	London Wayfarers M1s	18	10	3	5	33
3	Spencer M1s	18	9	5	4	32
4	Brighton & Hove M1s	18	9	2	7	29
5	Bromley & Beckenham M1s	18	7	6	5	27
6	Old Cranleighan M1s	18	7	3	8	24
7	Hampstead & Westminster M2s	18	6	6	6	24
8	Wimbledon M2s	18	7	0	11	21
9	Tunbridge Wells M1s (R)	18	4	6	8	18
10	West Herts M1s (R)	18	2	2	14	8

=== Conference Midlands ===
Pos	Team	P	W	D	L	Pts
1	Repton M1s	18	13	4	1	43
2	Norwich City M1s	18	10	5	3	35
3	Chelmsford M1s	18	10	4	4	34
4	St Albans M1s	18	8	4	6	28
5	Barford Tigers M1s	18	6	6	6	24
6	City of Peterborough M1s	18	7	2	9	23
7	University of Nottingham M2s	18	6	4	8	22
8	University of Birmingham M2s	18	4	4	10	16
9	Harleston Magpies M1s (R)	18	4	2	12	14
10	Cambridge City M1s (R)	18	4	1	13	13

=== Conference North ===
Pos	Team	P	W	D	L	Pts
1	Timperley M1s	18	15	3	0	48
2	Leeds M1s	18	12	3	3	39
3	Doncaster M1s	18	11	3	4	36
4	Didsbury Northern M1s	18	9	3	6	30
5	Oxton M1s	18	8	1	9	23
6	Ben Rhydding M1s	18	4	5	9	17
7	Sheffield M1s	18	4	5	9	17
8	Durham University M2s	18	4	3	11	15
9	Wakefield M1s (R)	18	4	2	12	14
10	Brooklands Manchester University M2s (R)	18	4	2	12	14

=== Conference West ===
Pos	Team	P	W	D	L	Pts
1	Guildford M1s	18	17	1	0	52
2	Clifton Robinsons M1s	18	14	2	2	44
3	Chichester M1s	18	8	3	7	27
4	University of Exeter M2s	18	7	6	5	27
5	Ashmoor M1s	18	7	4	7	25
6	Oxford Hawks M1s	18	7	1	10	22
7	Isca M1s	18	6	3	9	21
8	Fareham M1s	18	6	2	10	20
9	Reading M2s (R)	18	3	4	11	13
10	Team Bath Buccaneers M2s (R)	18	1	2	15	5

== England Hockey Men's Championship Cup ==
=== Semi-finals ===
Date	Team 1	Team 2	Score
15 Feb	Beeston	Indian Gymkhana	0–1
6 Apr	Harborne	Canterbury	2–1

=== Final ===
- Venue Nottingham Hockey Centre

Date	Team 1	Team 2	Score
17 May	Harborne	Indian Gymkhana	2–1

Final teams

Harborne
- 1 Daniel Whittingham (gk)
- 3. Jake Litchfield
- 4. Pete Jackson
- 6. Tom Thorne
- 7. Cameron Ley
- 10. James Hall
- 11. Louie Morris (c)
- 12. Tom Poustie
- 14. Timothy Idoine
- 18. Oliver Horsler
- 24. Alexander Idoine
- 25. Joshua Jones
- 26. Duncan Miller
- 52 Niall Devaney-Dykes
- 66. Owen Raw
Indian Gymkhana
- 4. Ollie Willars
- 5. Yurav Saund
- 6. Gagan Hanspal
- 7. Ekam Bachu
- 8. Amrit Singh
- 10. James Tindall
- 11. Dylan Coleman
- 12. Ippel Fujimoto
- 13. Ranjeev Deol
- 14. Jaggy Hanspal (c)
- 16. Nihal Bilkhu
- 18. Amaraj Flora
- 20. Daman Bansal
- 24. Amraj Soor
- 31. Vishal Kapila
- 41 Jack Christian (gk)
- Paul Reeves (gk)

== See also ==
- 2024–25 Women's England Hockey League season
