= 2025–26 Men's England Hockey League season =

English field hockey season

Men's England Hockey League

The 2025–26 Men's England Hockey League season is the 2025–26 season of England's field hockey league structure for men.

The regular league season started on 20 September 2025 and ended on 29 March 2026. Surbiton are the defending league champions, having won the Premier Division in 2024–25.

The England Hockey Men's Championship Cup which included Premier division teams was discontinued in favour of a lower tier events.

== Summary ==
Reading returned to the Premier Division again following their recent relegation at the end of the 2024 season. They were joined by Brooklands Manchester University, who themselves were relegated in 2022–23. The four teams promoted to Division 1 from the conference divisions were Guildford, Surbiton 2nd XI, Repton and Timperley.

Old Georgians won their fourth title in five seasons after defeating Wimbledon 3–2 in the Premier Division finals.

== Format ==
- Phase 1 - 11 matches per club determining the top six and bottom six clubs for phase 2.
- Phase 2 - 5 additional matches per club determining the top eight and bottom four clubs for phase 3.
- Phase 3 - 3 additional matches per club determining the top four to progress to league finals weekend and the bottom two to be relegated.

== 2025-2026 teams ==
=== Premier Division ===
Team	City/town	Home pitch
Beeston	Beeston	Nottingham Hockey Centre
Brooklands Manchester University	Sale	Brooklands Sports Club
Cardiff & Met	Cardiff	Sophia Gardens
East Grinstead	East Grinstead	East Grinstead Sports Club, Saint Hill Rd
Hampstead & Westminster	Paddington	Paddington Recreation Ground
Holcombe	Rochester	Holcombe Park, Curtis Way
Old Georgians	Addlestone	St George's College
Oxted	Oxted	Caterham School
Reading	Reading	Sonning Lane
Southgate	Trent Park	Southgate Hockey Centre
Surbiton	Long Ditton	Surbiton HC, Sugden Road
Wimbledon	Wimbledon	Raynes Park High School

=== Division One South ===
Team	City/town	Home pitch
Canterbury	Canterbury	Polo Farm
Guildford	Guildford	Broadwater School
Havant	Havant	Havant Park
Indian Gymkhana	Isleworth	Indiana Gymkhana Club, Thornbury Ave
Old Loughtonians	Chigwell	Roding Sports Centre, Luxborough Lane
Richmond	Chiswick	Quintin Hogg Memorial Sports
Sevenoaks	Sevenoaks	Vine Cricket Ground, Hollybush Lane
Surbiton 2nd XI	Long Ditton	Surbiton HC, Sugden Road
Teddington	Teddington	Teddington School
University of Exeter	Exeter	Streatham Campus

=== Division One North ===
Team	City/town	Home pitch
Bowdon	Bowdon	The Bowdon Club
Deeside Ramblers	Tiverton	Whitchurch Road
Durham University	Durham	The Graham Sports Centre
Harborne	Harborne	Eastern Road, King Edward School
Loughborough Students	Loughborough	Loughborough University
Repton	Repton	Repton Sports Centre, Willington Road
Timperley	Altrincham	Timperley Sports Club, Stockport Road
Olton & West Warwicks	Olton	West Warwickshire Sports Club
University of Birmingham	Birmingham	Bournbrook
University of Nottingham	Nottingham	University of Nottingham

== League Tables ==
=== Premier Division ===
Pos	Team	P	W	D	L	Pts	Section
1	Surbiton	16	16	0	0	48	Top 6-top 8
2	Wimbledon	16	11	3	2	36	Top 6-top 8
3	Old Georgians	16	10	2	4	32	Top 6-top 8
4	Hampstead & Westminster	16	9	3	4	30	Top 6-top 8
5	Holcombe	16	8	1	7	25	Top 6-top 8
6	Oxted	16	3	4	9	13	Top 6-top 8
7	East Grinstead	16	6	5	5	23	Bottom 6-top 8
8	Cardiff & Met	16	5	2	9	17	Bottom 6-top 8
9	Reading	16	4	3	9	15	Bottom 6-bottom 4
10	Southgate	16	3	5	8	14	Bottom 6-bottom 4
11	Beeston	16	3	2	11	11	Bottom 6-bottom 4
12	Brooklands Manchester University	16	1	4	11	7	Bottom 6-bottom 4

==== Top 8 - Phase 3 ====
Pool A
Pos	Team	Pts
1	Surbiton	9
2	Hampstead & Westminster	6
3	Holcombe	2
4	Cardiff & Met	1

Pool B
Pos	Team	Pts
1	Old Georgians	9
2	Wimbledon	6
3	East Grinstead	3
4	Oxted	0

==== Finals weekend ====
All matches were played at the Sugden Road in Long Ditton.

Semi-finals
3 May
Surbiton	2
Wimbledon	4
3 May
Old Georgians	3
Hampstead & Westminster	1

Final
4 May
Wimbledon	2
Old Georgians	3
Third place
4 May
Surbiton	2 (3)
Hampstead & Westminster	2 (1)

Semi-finals

2 May 2026
15:30

Surbiton	2–4	Wimbledon

2 May 2026
17:45

Old Georgians	3–1	Hampstead & Westminster

Third and fourth place

3 May 2025
13:15

Surbiton	2–2 (3–1p)	Hampstead & Westminster
T Nurse, Anderson		Jones, French

Final

3 May 2025
18:00

Old Georgians	3–2	Wimbledon
Weir, Ames, Croft		Kaeppeler, Tipper

==== Finals squads ====
Old Georgians
- 1. James Mazarelo (goalkeeper)
- 2. Pablo Usoz Jr.
- 3. Henry Weir
- 4. Liam Sanford
- 5. David Ames
- 6. Kyle Marshall
- 8. Tom Carson
- 9. James Carson
- 10. Henry Croft
- 11. Dan Shingles
- 13. Sam Ward
- 15. Phil Roper
- 18. James Albery (captain)
- 19. Chris Proctor
- 23. David Condon
- 77. Alan Forsyth
Hampstead & Westminster
- 3. Kevin O'Dea
- 4. Damon Steffens
- 5. James Oates
- 9. Rupert Shipperley (captain)
- 10. Ted Graves
- 11. Rhys Bradshaw
- 12. Sam French
- 14. Hywel Jones
- 15. Jolyon Morgan
- 17. Toby Vaughan
- 21. Lekan Ogunlana (goalkeeper)
- 22. Michael Robson
- 24. Archie Foster
- 26. Matt Richards
- 29. Robbie Gleeson
- 42. Jake Glew
Surbiton
- 1. Calum Douglas (goalkeeper)
- 5. Max Anderson
- 6. Nick Nurse
- 7. Jonny Gall
- 8. Tim Nurse
- 9. Tommy Austin
- 10. Nick Park
- 15. Barry Middleton
- 17. Stuart Rushmere
- 18. Gareth Furlong
- 19. David Goodfield (captain)
- 21. Adam Buckle
- 23. Nick Bandurak
- 26. James Gall
- 27. Conor Williamson
- 31. Will Calnan
Wimbledon
- 1 Toby Reynolds-Cotterill (goalkeeper)
- 3. Alex Sheldon
- 5. Jack Turner
- 7. Duncan Scott
- 9. Eddie Harper
- 12. Jules Bournac
- 13. Eddie Way
- 14. Louis Tipper
- 15. Sam Hooper (captain)
- 16. James Vallely
- 17. Ben Fox
- 18. Euan Gilmour
- 19. Benjamin Francis
- 21. Liam Ansell
- 23. Jonathan Lankfer
- 25. Kei Käppeler

=== Division One North ===
Pos	Team	P	W	D	L	Pts
1	Bowdon M1s	18	13	4	1	43
2	Repton M1s	18	12	4	2	40
3	Loughborough Students M1s	18	11	3	4	36
4	Harborne M1s	18	8	6	4	30
5	University of Nottingham M1s	18	9	3	6	30
6	University of Birmingham M1s	18	7	3	8	24
7	Durham University M1s	18	4	4	10	16
8	Timperley M1s	18	3	7	8	16
9	Deeside Ramblers M1s (R)	18	3	2	13	11
10	Olton & West Warwicks M1s (R)	18	2	0	12	6

=== Division One South ===
Pos	Team	P	W	D	L	Pts
1	University of Exeter M1s	18	14	2	2	44
2	Guildford M1s	18	9	6	3	33
3	Sevenoaks M1s	18	9	5	4	32
4	Teddington M1s	18	6	8	4	26
5	Old Loughtonians M1s	18	7	5	6	26
6	Richmond M1s	18	6	5	7	23
7	Indian Gymkhana M1s	18	4	8	6	20
8	Surbiton M2s	18	5	4	9	19
9	Canterbury M1s (R)	18	4	1	13	13
10	Havant M1s (R)	18	3	2	13	11

=== Conference East ===
Pos	Team	P	W	D	L	Pts
1	Hampstead & Westminster M2s	18	14	3	2	42
2	Holcombe M2s	18	10	4	4	34
3	Old Cranleighan M1s	18	10	2	6	32
4	London Wayfarers M1s	18	9	4	5	31
5	Spencer M1s	18	7	3	8	24
6	Southgate M2s	18	7	3	8	24
7	Bromley & Beckenham M1s	18	7	2	9	23
8	Chelmsford M1s	18	5	1	12	16
9	Brighton & Hove M1s (R)	18	4	4	10	16
10	Wimbledon M2s (R)	18	4	2	12	14

=== Conference Midlands ===
Pos	Team	P	W	D	L	Pts
1	Leek M1s	18	13	5	0	44
2	Oxford Hawks M1s	18	12	4	2	40
3	St Albans	18	8	8	2	32
4	Norwich City M1s	18	7	4	7	25
5	Barford Tigers M1s	18	7	4	7	25
6	City of Peterborough M1s	18	7	2	9	23
7	Banbury M1s	18	5	5	8	20
8	University of Nottingham M2s	18	5	4	9	19
9	University of Birmingham M2s (R)	18	4	2	12	14
10	Stourport M1s (R)	18	1	4	13	7

=== Conference North ===
Pos	Team	P	W	D	L	Pts
1	Leeds M1s	18	14	3	1	45
2	Neston M1s	18	13	3	2	42
3	Lindum M1s	18	12	3	3	39
4	Sheffield M1s	18	10	5	3	35
5	Doncaster M1s	18	8	3	7	27
6	Durham University M2s	18	5	2	11	17
7	Newcastle University M1s	18	4	4	10	16
8	Didsbury Northern M1s	18	5	1	12	16
9	Ben Rhydding M1s (R)	18	3	2	13	11
10	Oxton M1s (R)	18	1	4	13	7

=== Conference West ===
Pos	Team	P	W	D	L	Pts
1	Clifton Robinsons M1s	18	11	5	2	38
2	Marlow M1s	18	12	2	4	38
3	Chichester M1s	18	9	6	3	33
4	Team Bath Buccaneers M1s	18	10	2	6	32
5	Ashmoor	18	8	3	7	27
6	Indian Gymkhana	14	4	6	4	18
7	University of Exeter M2s	18	4	4	6	16
8	Fareham M1s	18	5	2	11	17
9	University of Bristol M1s (R)	18	5	1	12	16
10	Isca M1s (R)	18	3	5	10	14

== See also ==
- 2025–26 Women's England Hockey League season
