= 2023–24 Men's England Hockey League season =

English field hockey season

Men's England Hockey League
- Champions: Old Georgians (league); Beeston (cup)

The 2023–24 Men's England Hockey League season was the 2023–24 season of England's field hockey league structure and England Hockey Men's Championship Cup for men. The season started on 16 September 2023. Old Georgians were the defending league and cup champions, having won the league and cup double twice during the last two seasons.

Old Georgians secured a third successive league championship defeating Surbiton 3-1 in the play off final. Beeston regained the England Hockey Men's Championship Cup that they last won in 2020.

== Format ==
The Premier Division changed the system of phases and matches, whereby it was possible for a team finishing eighth after phase 2 to still win the title.

- Phase 1 - 11 matches per club determining the top six and bottom six clubs for phase 2.
- Phase 2 - 5 additional matches per club determining the top eight and bottom four clubs for phase 3.
- Phase 3 - 3 additional matches per club determining the top four to progress to league finals weekend and the bottom two to be relegated.

== 2023-24 teams ==
=== Premier Division ===
Locations of the 2023–24 Premier Division teams
Greater London Premier Division hockey teams

Team	City/town	Home pitch
Beeston	Beeston	Nottingham Hockey Centre
Cardiff & Met	Cardiff	Sophia Gardens
East Grinstead	East Grinstead	East Grinstead Sports Club, Saint Hill Rd
Hampstead & Westminster	Paddington	Paddington Recreation Ground
Holcombe	Rochester	Holcombe Park, Curtis Way
Old Georgians	Addlestone	St George's College
Oxted	Oxted	Caterham School
Reading	Reading	Sonning Lane
Southgate	Trent Park	Southgate Hockey Centre
Surbiton	Long Ditton	Sugden Road
University of Nottingham	Nottingham	University of Nottingham
Wimbledon	Wimbledon	King's College School

=== Division One South ===
Locations of the 2023–24 Division One teams; red = South, blue = north
Greater London Division One hockey teams

Team	City/town	Home pitch
Brighton & Hove	Brighton & Hove	Blatchington Mill
Canterbury	Canterbury	Polo Farm
Havant	Havant	Havant Park
Old Cranleighans	Thames Ditton	Portsmouth Road
Old Loughtonians	Chigwell	Roding Sports Centre, Luxborough Lane
Richmond	Chiswick	Quintin Hogg Memorial Sports
Sevenoaks	Sevenoaks	Vine Cricket Ground, Hollybush Lane
Team Bath Buccaneers	Bath	University of Bath
Teddington	Teddington	Teddington School
University of Exeter	Exeter	Streatham Campus

=== Division One North ===
Team	City/town	Home pitch
Bowdon	Bowdon	The Bowdon Club
Brooklands Manchester University	Sale	Brooklands Sports Club
Cambridge City	Cambridge	University Sports Ground
Deeside Ramblers	Tiverton	Whitchurch Road
Durham University	Durham	The Graham Sports Centre
Harborne	Harborne	Eastern Road, King Edward School
Leeds	Leeds	Sports Park Weetwood
Loughborough Students	Loughborough	Loughborough University
Olton & West Warwicks	Olton	West Warwickshire Sports Club
University of Birmingham	Birmingham	Bournbrook

== Final tables ==
=== Premier Division ===
Pos	Team	P	W	D	L	Pts	Section
1	Old Georgians	16	15	0	1	45	Top 6-top 8
2	Surbiton	16	13	0	3	39	Top 6-top 8
3	Wimbledon	16	12	0	4	36	Top 6-top 8
4	Holcombe	16	11	0	5	33	Top 6-top 8
5	Hampstead & Westminster	16	8	0	7	24	Top 6-top 8
6	Southgate	16	5	1	10	16	Top 6-top 8
7	Oxted	16	7	2	7	23	Bottom 6-top 8
8	Beeston	16	7	1	8	22	Bottom 6-top 8
9	East Grinstead	19	8	1	10	25	Bottom 6-bottom 4
10	Cardiff & Met	19	3	5	11	14	Bottom 6-bottom 4
11	Reading (R)	19	3	2	14	11	Bottom 6-bottom 4
12	University of Nottingham (R)	19	2	4	13	10	Bottom 6-bottom 4

==== Top 8 - Phase 3 ====
Pool A
Pos	Team	Pts
1	Old Georgians	9
2	Hampstead & W	6
3	Holcombe	3
4	Beeston	0

Pool B
Pos	Team	Pts
1	Surbiton	7
2	Wimbledon	7
3	Southgate	4
4	Oxted	0

==== Finals weekend ====
Semi-finals
13 Apr – Sugden Road, Long Ditton
Surbiton	4
Hampstead	1
13 Apr – Sugden Road, Long Ditton
Old Georgians	4
Wimbledon	3

Final
14 Apr – Sugden Road, Long Ditton
Surbiton	1
Old Georgians	3

Old Georgians
George Pinner (gk), Henry Weir, Liam Sanford, Thabang Modise, Tom Carson, James Carson (fg 57th minute), Ashley Jackson, Dan Shingles (c) (pc 45th minute), Josh Pavis, Lee Morton (fg 22nd minute), Edward Carson, Chris Griffiths, Chris Proctor, Sam Hiha, Matthew Brown, Alan Forsyth

Surbiton
James Mazarelo (gk), Luke Naylor, Rob Farrington, Jonny Gall, Tim Nurse (c), Nick Park, Struan Walker (fg 2nd minute), Louis Gittens, Stuart Rushmere, Brendan Creed, Adam Buckle, Alex Williams, Sam Corney, Conor Williamson, Gareth Furlong, Jack Hobkirk

=== Division One South ===
Pos	Team	P	W	D	L	Pts
1	Richmond M1s	18	14	1	3	43
2	Teddington M1s	18	11	3	4	36
3	University of Exeter M1s	18	10	4	4	34
4	Old Loughtonians M1s	18	9	3	6	30
5	Canterbury M1s	18	7	5	6	26
6	Team Bath Buccaneers M1s	18	6	4	8	22
7	Sevenoaks M1s	18	5	6	7	21
8	Havant M1s	18	5	5	8	20
9	Old Cranleighan M1s (R)	18	5	3	10	18
10	Brighton & Hove M1s (R)	18	1	0	17	3

=== Division One North ===
Pos	Team	P	W	D	L	Pts
1	Bowdon M1s	18	15	2	1	47
2	Loughborough Students M1s	18	12	3	3	39
3	Brooklands Manchester University M1s	18	11	2	5	35
4	Durham University M1s	18	10	2	6	32
5	Olton & West Warwicks M1s	18	8	2	8	26
6	Harborne M1s	18	6	5	7	23
7	University of Birmingham M1s	18	6	4	8	22
8	Deeside Ramblers M1s	18	4	3	11	15
9	Leeds M1s (R)	18	3	2	13	11
10	Cambridge City M1s (R)	18	1	3	14	6

=== Conference East ===
Pos	Team	P	W	D	L	Pts
1	Indian Gymkhana M1s	18	12	4	2	40
2	London Wayfarers M1s	18	11	3	4	36
3	Guildford M1s	18	10	3	5	33
4	Spencer M1s	18	10	1	7	31
5	Surbiton M2s	18	7	4	7	25
6	Hampstead & Westminster M2s	18	6	5	7	23
7	Wimbledon M2s	18	6	2	10	20
8	Bromley & Beckenham M1s	18	4	6	8	18
9	Old Georgians M2s (R)	18	4	3	11	15
10	Ipswich M1s (R)	18	4	1	13	13

=== Conference Midlands ===
Pos	Team	P	W	D	L	Pts
1	University of Nottingham M2s	18	14	2	2	44
2	Stourport M1s	18	12	5	1	41
3	Norwich City M1s	18	11	4	3	37
4	Barford Tigers M1s	18	11	4	3	37
5	Banbury M1s	18	5	5	8	20
6	Harleston Magpies M1s	18	4	5	9	17
7	University of Birmingham M2s	18	4	4	10	16
8	St Albans M1s	18	4	4	10	16
9	Bedford M1s (R)	18	3	3	12	12
10	City of Peterborough M1s (R)	18	2	4	12	10

=== Conference North ===
Pos	Team	P	W	D	L	Pts
1	Lindum M1s	18	16	1	1	49
2	Timperley M1s	18	15	1	2	46
3	Doncaster M1s	18	14	1	3	43
4	Wakefield M1s	18	8	0	10	24
5	Ben Rhydding M1s	18	8	0	10	24
6	Brooklands Manchester University M2s	18	7	2	9	23
7	Oxton M1s	18	6	2	10	20
8	Sheffield M1s	18	5	3	10	18
9	Beeston M2s (R)	18	5	2	11	17
10	Belper M1s (R)	18	0	0	18	0

=== Conference West ===
Pos	Team	P	W	D	L	Pts
1	University of Bristol M1s	18	14	2	2	44
2	Isca M1s	18	10	3	5	33
3	Clifton Robinsons M1s	18	10	1	7	31
4	Oxford Hawks M1s	18	9	4	5	31
5	University of Exeter M2s	18	9	1	8	28
6	Chichester M1s	18	7	2	9	23
7	Fareham M1s	18	7	1	10	22
8	Ashmoor M1s	18	6	3	9	21
9	Cheltenham M1s (R)	18	6	2	10	20
10	Plymouth Marjon M1s (R)	18	1	3	14	6

== England Hockey Men's Championship Cup ==
=== Semi-finals ===
Date	Team 1	Team 2	Score
7 Apr	Beeston	Norwich City	5–3
7 Apr	Old Georgians	Banbury	3–5

=== Final ===
- Lee Valley Hockey and Tennis Centre

Date	Team 1	Team 2	Score
6 May	Beeston	Banbury	4–2

Beeston
Toby Jackson (gk), Toby Stanley, Alasdair Richmond, Robbie Gleeson, Gareth Griffiths (c), Ben Collinson, Ollie Ashdown, Henry Croft (pc 51st minute, fg 66th minute), Brendan Andrews, Owen Sutton, Joe Paul, William Prentice (fg 40th minute), Max Sowter (fg 58th minute), Dylan Lim, Jack Stamp, Ryan Day

Banbury
Fergus Dunleavy (gk), Charlie Camp, Pete Lamb, Josh Nunneley (pc 55th minute), Sam Pick, Joe Allen, Tyson Nunneley (pc 30th minute), Connor Roberts, Jacob Buckner-Rowley, George Brooker (c), Jamie Boardman, Will Kellett, Jonty Duffy, Tom Crowfoot, James Long, Will Crowfoot

== See also ==
- 2023–24 Women's England Hockey League season
