= 2022–23 Men's England Hockey League season =

English field hockey season

Men's England Hockey League
- Champions: Old Georgians (league); Old Georgians (cup)

The 2022–23 Men's England Hockey League season was the 2022–23 season of England's field hockey league structure and England Hockey Men's Championship Cup. The season started on 24 September 2022.

Old Georgians were the defending league and cup champions. The Premier Division created a system of three phases; the first phase would consist of 10 matches per club and would be completed by the end of 2022, determining the top six clubs (irrespective of home and away advantage) for phase 2. Phase three saw the play offs return and included the bottom four sides competing in a relegation play off.

Old Georgians Hockey Club successfully defended their title after beating Holcombe 5–1 in the play off final. They then won the double after winning the England Hockey Men's Championship Cup, defeating Beeston in the final.

== 2022-23 teams ==
=== Premier Division ===
Team	City/town	Home pitch
Beeston	Beeston, Nottinghamshire	Nottingham Hockey Centre
Brooklands Manchester University	Sale, Greater Manchester	Brooklands Sports Club
East Grinstead	East Grinstead, West Sussex	East Grinstead Sports Club, Saint Hill Rd
Hampstead & Westminster	Maida Vale, Paddington	Paddington Recreation Ground
Holcombe	Rochester, Kent	Holcombe Park, Curtis Way
Old Georgians	Addlestone	St George's College
Oxted	Oxted	Caterham School
Reading	Reading, Berkshire	Sonning Lane
Surbiton	Long Ditton, Surrey	Sugden Road
University of Exeter	Exeter	Streatham Campus
University of Nottingham	Nottingham	University of Nottingham
Wimbledon	Wimbledon, London	King's College School

=== Division One South ===
Team	City/town	Home pitch
Brighton & Hove	Brighton and Hove	Blatchington Mill
Canterbury	Canterbury	Polo Farm
Old Cranleighans	Thames Ditton	Portsmouth Road
Old Loughtonians	Chigwell	Roding Sports Centre, Luxborough Lane
Oxford Hawks	Oxford	Banbury Road North
Sevenoaks	Sevenoaks, Kent	Vine Cricket Ground, Hollybush Lane
Southgate	Trent Park	Southgate Hockey Centre
Team Bath Buccaneers	Bath	University of Bath
Teddington	Teddington	Teddington School
University of Bristol	Bristol	Coombe Dingle Sports Complex, Coombe Lane

=== Division One North ===
Team	City/town	Home pitch
Barford Tigers	Birmingham	Hamstead Hall Academy
Belper	Belper	Belper Meadows, Bridge Street
Bowdon	Bowdon, Greater Manchester	The Bowdon Club
Cambridge City	Cambridge	University Sports Ground
Cardiff & Met	Cardiff	Sophia Gardens
Deeside Ramblers	Tiverton	Whitchurch Road
Durham University	Durham	The Graham Sports Centre
Loughborough Students	Loughborough	Loughborough University
Olton & West Warwicks	Olton	West Warwickshire Sports Club
University of Birmingham	University of Birmingham	Bournbrook

== Final tables ==
=== Premier Division ===
Pos	Team	P	W	D	L	Pts	Section
1	Old Georgians	16	15	1	0	46	Top 6
2	Surbiton	16	12	2	2	38	
3	Wimbledon	16	10	1	5	31	
4	Holcombe	16	9	3	4	30	
5	Hampstead and Westminster	16	8	2	6	26	
6	Reading	16	4	1	11	13	
7	Oxted	16	6	4	6	22	Bottom 6
8	Beeston	16	6	3	7	21	
9	University of Nottingham	19	7	1	11	22	Phase 3
10	East Grinstead	19	6	3	10	21	
11	University of Exeter (R)	19	6	2	11	20	
12	Brooklands Manchester University (R)	19	0	3	16	3	

==== Play-offs ====
The semi-finals took place on 1 April and the final on 2 April, at the Surbiton Hockey Club.

Semi-finals
1 Apr – Long Ditton
Old Georgians	0 (4)p
Wimbledon	0 (3)p
1 Apr – Long Ditton
Surbiton	1
Holcombe	2

Final
2 Apr – Long Ditton
Old Georgians	5
Holcombe	1

Old Georgians
George Pinner (gk), Henry Weir, Liam Sanford, Nick Page, Kyle Marshall, Tom Carson, James Carson, James Tindall, Dan Shingles, Sam Ward, Josh Pavis, Lee Morton, Edward Carson, James Albery (c), Chris Proctor, James Cunningham

Holcombe
Ollie Payne (gk), Tim Guise-Brown, Sam Taylor, Jose Maldonado, Greg Nolan, Phil Roper, Hayden Phillips, Rhodri Furlong, Jake Owen, Louis Parker, Thomas Russell, Alex Moen, Robert Field, Barry Middleton, Mo Mea, Nick Bandurak (c)

=== Division One North ===
Pos	Team	P	W	D	L	Pts
1	Cardiff & Met M1s (P)	18	16	0	2	48
2	Bowdon M1s	18	14	0	4	42
3	Durham University M1s	18	12	2	4	38
4	Loughborough Students M1s	18	12	2	4	38
5	Olton & West Warwicks M1s	18	6	3	9	21
6	Cambridge City M1s	18	6	2	10	20
7	University of Birmingham M1s	18	5	3	10	18
8	Deeside Ramblers M1s	18	4	3	11	15
9	Belper M1s (R)	18	4	0	14	12
10	Barford Tigers M1s (R)	18	3	1	14	10

=== Division One South ===
Pos	Team	P	W	D	L	Pts
1	Southgate M1s (P)	18	15	1	2	46
2	Old Loughtonians M1s	18	12	1	5	37
3	Teddington M1s	18	11	3	4	36
4	Canterbury M1s	18	10	3	5	33
5	Sevenoaks M1s	18	8	2	8	26
6	Team Bath Buccaneers M1s	18	7	4	7	25
7	Brighton & Hove M1s	18	5	3	10	18
8	Old Cranleighans M1s	18	4	3	11	15
9	University of Bristol M1s (R)	18	2	5	11	11
10	Oxford Hawks M1s (R)	18	2	3	13	9

=== Conference East ===
Pos	Team	P	W	D	L	Pts
1	Richmond M1s	18	14	1	3	43
2	Spencer M1s	18	14	1	3	43
3	Guildford M1s	18	12	3	3	39
4	Surbiton M2s	18	9	3	6	30
5	London Wayfarers M1s	18	7	5	6	26
6	Indian Gymkhana M1s	18	5	2	11	17
7	Hampstead & Westminster M2s	18	5	2	11	17
8	Bromley & Beckenham M1s	18	3	6	9	15
9	Wapping M1s (R)	18	3	5	10	14
10	Oxford University M1s (R)	18	3	2	13	11

=== Conference Midlands ===
Pos	Team	P	W	D	L	Pts
1	Harborne M1s	18	16	0	2	48
2	University of Nottingham M2s	18	10	4	4	34
3	Norwich City M1s	18	10	3	5	33
4	City of Peterborough M1s	18	9	3	8	30
5	Harleston Magpies M1s	18	9	1	8	28
6	St Albans M1s	18	7	3	8	24
7	University of Birmingham M2s	18	6	3	9	21
8	Bedford M1s	18	5	5	8	20
9	Lichfield M1s (R)	18	4	2	12	14
10	Loughborough Town M1s (R)	18	0	14	4	4

=== Conference North ===
Pos	Team	P	W	D	L	Pts
1	Leeds M1s	18	13	3	2	42
2	Timperley M1s	18	12	3	3	39
3	Wakefield M1s	18	10	1	7	31
4	Brooklands Manchester University M2s	18	10	1	7	31
5	Beeston M2s	18	8	1	9	25
6	Ben Rhydding M1s	18	7	3	8	24
7	Sheffield M1s	18	6	4	8	22
8	Doncaster M1s	18	6	3	9	21
9	Didsbury Northern M1s (R)	18	4	3	11	15
10	Preston M1s (R)	18	3	0	15	9

=== Conference West ===
Pos	Team	P	W	D	L	Pts
1	Havant M1s	18	12	5	1	41
2	Chichester M1s	18	9	6	3	33
3	Isca M1s	18	10	3	5	33
4	University of Exeter M2s	18	7	5	6	26
5	Clifton Robinsons M1s	18	7	3	8	24
6	Plymouth Marjon M1s	18	5	8	5	23
7	Ashmoor M1s	18	5	7	6	22
8	Fareham M1s	18	5	6	7	21
9	Cardiff University M1s (R)	18	3	4	11	13
10	Cardiff & Met M2s (R)	18	2	3	13	9

== England Hockey Men's Championship Cup ==
=== Semi-finals ===
Date	Team 1	Team 2	Score
15 Apr	Beeston	Brooklands	2–1
16 Apr	Teddington	Old Georgians	1–6

=== Final ===
- Lee Valley Hockey and Tennis Centre

Date	Team 1	Team 2	Score	Scorers
30 Apr	Old Georgians	Beeston	5–5 (2–1p)	Carson J (2), Weir, Tindall, Shingles / Golden (3), Bhuhi, Fletcher

Old Georgians
Nick Bull (gk), Henry Weir, Nick Page, Kyle Marshall, Tom Carson, James Carson, James Tindall, Dan Shingles (c), Josh Pavis, Edward Carson, Chris Proctor, James Cunningham, Alex Clayton-Jones, Willem Owens, Arthur Owens, Pravinder Hanspal

Beeston
Simon Hujwan (gk), Toby Stanley, Gareth Griffiths (c), Jamie Golden, Henry Croft, Ollie Ashdown, Balraj Panesar, Brendan Andrews, Will Prentice, Alasdair Richmond, Rohan Bhuhi, George Fletcher, Ben Collinson, Louis Duprez, David Bond, Andrew Leonard

== See also ==
- 2022–23 Women's England Hockey League season
