= 2021–22 Men's England Hockey League season =

Men's England Hockey League
- Champions: Old Georgians (league); Old Georgians (cup)

The 2021–22 Men's England Hockey League season is the 2021–22 season of England's field hockey league structure and England Hockey Men's Championship Cup. The 2021–22 season returned to normality following two seasons of disruption caused by the COVID-19 pandemic in the United Kingdom. The 2021-22 Premier Division saw the same teams competing from the following season, which had been cancelled. Therefore Surbiton were the defending champions, having won the league during the 2019–20 season.

The season started on 19 September 2021, with the Premier Division using a new system of two phases. The first phase would consist of 10 matches per club and would be completed by the end of 2021, determining the top six clubs (irrespective of home and away advantage) for phase 2. The other divisions would use the traditional format.

Old Georgians secured their first ever Premier division title with two games to spare. The success continued a remarkable rise in English hockey because the team had only been promoted into the league at the start of the 2019-20 season. Six times champions Reading won Division One South and therefore sealed promotion back to the Premier Division following their 2019 relegation (their first in 30 years). University of Nottingham won Division One North to also gain promotion.

Old Georgians went on to secure a league and cup double after winning the 2022 England Hockey Men's Championship Cup.

== Final Tables ==
=== Premier Division ===
Pos	Team	P	W	D	L	GF	GA	Pts	Section
1	Old Georgians	20	17	1	2	89	20	52	Top 6
2	Wimbledon	20	14	2	4	72	34	44	
3	Surbiton	20	13	3	4	82	38	42	
4	Hampstead and Westminster	20	10	2	8	54	46	32	
5	Holcombe	20	10	2	8	61	60	32	
6	East Grinstead	20	3	2	15	32	80	11	
7	Oxted	18	8	2	8	44	51	26	Bottom 5
8	Brooklands Manchester University	18	6	4	8	39	73	22	
9	Beeston	18	5	3	10	34	48	18	
10	University of Exeter	18	4	2	12	46	57	14	
11	Durham University (R)	18	3	1	14	19	65	10	relegated

=== Division One South ===
Pos	Team	P	W	D	L	GF	GA	Pts
1	Reading	18	13	0	5	63	30	39
2	Canterbury	18	11	3	4	52	26	36
3	Team Bath Buccaneers	18	9	5	4	39	26	32
4	Sevenoaks	18	9	3	6	36	29	30
5	Old Cranleighans	18	7	6	5	36	41	27
6	Teddington	18	7	3	8	45	48	24
7	Southgate	18	7	1	10	29	36	22
8	Oxford Hawks	18	6	3	9	28	37	21
9	Brighton & Hove	18	4	3	11	31	62	15
10	Havant (R)	18	3	1	14	25	49	10

=== Division One North ===
Pos	Team	P	W	D	L	GF	GA	Pts
1	University of Nottingham	18	17	0	1	67	19	51
2	Loughborough Students	18	15	12	1	83	21	47
3	Cardiff & Met	18	11	4	3	69	30	37
4	Olton & West Warwicks	18	8	1	9	40	46	25
5	Bowdon	18	8	0	10	48	42	24
6	University of Birmingham	18	5	3	10	39	54	18
7	Cambridge City	18	5	2	11	33	61	17
8	Deeside Ramblers	18	3	5	10	36	77	14
9	Sheffield Hallam (R)	18	3	4	11	30	51	13
10	City of Peterborough (R)	18	3	3	12	33	77	12

== England Hockey Men's Championship Cup ==
=== Quarter-finals ===
Date	Team 1	Team 2	Score
10 Apr	Timperley	Brooklands	w/o
10 Apr	Oxford Hawks	Oxted	w/o
24 Apr	City of Peterborough	Old Georgians	0–5
24 Apr	Bowdon	Beeston	0–2

=== Semi-finals ===
Date	Team 1	Team 2	Score
30 Apr	Brooklands	Old Georgians	1–8
15 May	Oxted	Beeston	1–0

=== Final ===
- Lee Valley Hockey and Tennis Centre

Date	Team 1	Team 2	Score	Scorers
28 May	Old Georgians	Oxted	3–0	Shingles, Tindall, Carson

Old Georgians
George Pinner (gk), Andy Bull, Henry Weir, Nick Page, Kyle Marshall, James Carson, James Tindall, Dan Shingles (capt), Lee Morton, Edward Carson, Ashley Jackson; reps: Tom Carson, Thomas Doran, Elliott Messem, Dan Boden, Ben Jansen; dnp:Chris Proctor, James Cunningham; coach: Mike Hughes; manager:Jonny Stephens.
Oxted
Sam Williams (gk), Owen Williamson (capt), Lewis Fraser, Alex Blumfield, Lucas Ward, Sam Driver, Nick Giles, Chris Webster, Chris Porter, Jamie Batten, Cameron Heald; reps: Edward Carr, Ryan Kavanagh, Adam Miller, Oliver Bennett, Oscar Loft; coach: James Simpson; manager: Peter Crook.

== See also ==
- 2021–22 Women's England Hockey League season
