= 2020–21 Men's Hockey League season =

British field hockey season

Men's England Hockey League
- Champions: No winner declared (league); Oxted (cup)

The 2020–21 Men's England Hockey League season was the 2020–21 season of England's field hockey league structure and England Hockey Men's Championship Cup. The COVID-19 pandemic in the United Kingdom caused severe disruption with the season starting on 20 September 2020, five months later than scheduled and just one week after the delayed 2019–20 season had finally ended. However, after just five rounds of games the season was suspended during October due to COVID-19 once again. During March 2021 it became evident that the fixtures could not be fulfilled and the season was cancelled.

The 2020-21 Premier Division would have seen Surbiton defend the title. Oxted (winners of Division 1 South) and Durham University (winners of Division 1 North) joined the division to make an eleven team league instead of ten teams, with Reading being relegated. After five rounds from 20 September until 24 October, Surbiton topped the table before the league was suspended and eventually cancelled.

The Championship Cup was consolidated and rearranged as an early Summer tournament, some of the Premier Division sides were unable to field teams in the Cup, partly due to the delayed 2020 Summer Olympics preparation. Oxted from the Premier Division defeated Bowdon 3–2 in the final.

== Standings at time of league cancellation ==
=== Premier Division ===
Pos	Team	P	W	D	L	GF	GA	GD	Pts
1	Surbiton	5	4	0	1	26	7	19	12
2	Old Georgians	5	3	1	1	26	11	15	10
3	Hampstead and Westminster	5	3	1	1	17	9	8	10
4	Wimbledon	5	3	1	1	16	13	3	10
5	Holcombe	4	3	0	1	10	7	3	9
6	Beeston	5	2	2	1	14	13	1	8
7	East Grinstead	6	2	2	2	16	20	-4	8
8	Oxted	5	2	0	3	11	15	-4	6
9	Brooklands Manchester University	4	0	1	3	5	17	-12	1
10	University of Exeter	4	0	0	4	6	18	-12	0
11	Durham University	4	0	0	4	6	23	-17	0

== Play-offs ==
- Cancelled

=== Division One South ===
Pos	Team	P	W	D	L	GF	GA	GD	Pts
1	Teddington	6	4	1	1	15	10	5	13
2	Reading	6	4	0	2	17	5	12	12
3	Sevenoaks	6	3	2	1	17	15	2	11
4	Southgate	6	3	1	2	14	13	1	10
5	Canterbury	6	3	1	2	15	15	0	10
6	Oxford Hawks	6	3	0	3	17	19	-2	9
7	Brighton & Hove	6	1	3	2	14	15	-1	6
8	Team Bath Buccaneers	6	1	2	3	7	13	-6	5
9	Old Cranleighans	6	1	1	4	9	13	-4	4
10	Havant	6	1	1	4	13	20	-7	4

=== Division One North ===
Pos	Team	P	W	D	L	GF	GA	GD	Pts
1	Loughborough Students	5	5	0	0	20	7	13	15
2	University of Nottingham	4	2	2	0	9	6	3	8
3	Cardiff & Met	3	2	1	0	12	1	11	7
4	University of Birmingham	4	2	1	1	7	10	-3	7
5	Bowdon	3	2	0	1	9	3	6	6
6	Olton & West Warwicks	4	1	1	2	12	12	0	4
7	Cambridge City	5	1	1	3	13	16	-3	4
8	Deeside Ramblers	6	1	1	4	12	27	-15	4
9	City of Peterborough	5	1	0	4	9	14	-5	3
10	Sheffield Hallam	3	0	1	2	5	12	-7	1

== England Hockey Men's Championship Cup ==
=== Quarter-finals ===
Date	Team 1	Team 2	Score
27 June	Beeston	Repton	5-2
27 June	East Devon	Fareham	1-9
27 June	Oxted	Norwich City	3-0
27 June	Oxton	Bowdon	1-9

=== Semi-finals ===
Date	Team 1	Team 2	Score
4 July	Bowdon	Beeston	7-3
4 July	Fareham	Oxted	2-7

=== Final ===
- Nottingham Hockey Centre

Date	Team 1	Team 2	Score	Scorers
10 July	Oxted	Bowdon	3-2	Loft, Porter, Kavanagh / Egerton (2)

== See also ==
- 2020–21 Women's Hockey League season
