= Ollie Willars =

English field hockey player

Personal information
- Born: 25 June 1990 (age 36) Leicester, England

Sport
- Sport: Field hockey
- Position: Defender
Youth career
- Years: Team
- 2003: Beeston
Senior career
Years	Team	Caps	Goals
2003–2021	Beeston	-	-
2021-2024	HGC	-	-
2024-2025	Indian Gymkhana	-	-
National team
Years	Team	Caps	Goals
2012–2019	England & GB	138	(3)
Medal record
Men's field hockey
Representing England
EuroHockey Championship
Bronze medal – third place	2017 Amstelveen
Commonwealth Games
Bronze medal – third place	2014 Glasgow	Team
Bronze medal – third place	2018 Gold Coast	Team
Hockey World League
Bronze medal – third place	2014 New Delhi	Team

Oliver Wilton Willars (born 25 June 1990) known as Ollie Willars is an English field hockey player who plays as a defender for Dutch club HGC. He played a total of 138 matches for the England and Great Britain national teams, from 2012 until 2019.

== Biography ==
Willars was educated at Worksop College and joined Beeston when he was 12 years old and played club hockey for them in the Men's England Hockey League Premier Division.

While at Beeston, Willars competed for England in the men's hockey tournament at the 2014 Commonwealth Games where he won a bronze medal and repeated the bronze medal success four years later when he represented England at the 2018 Commonwealth Games in Gold Coast.

In March 2021 it was announced that he had joined Dutch Hoofdklasse club HGC for the 2021–22 season.

In April 2021 he announced his retirement from international hockey and during the Summer of 2024 he became the Head of Hockey at Marlborough College, ending his time in the Netherlands.

He joined Indian Gymkhana for the 2024–25 season.
