= James Tindall =

British field hockey player (born 1983)

Personal information
- Born: 22 April 1983 (age 43) Redhill, Surrey, England

Sport
- Sport: Field hockey
- Position: Forward
Senior career
Years	Team	Caps	Goals
2003–2005	Old Georgians	-	-
2005–2014	Surbiton	-	-
2014–2023	Old Georgians	-	-
2023–2025	Indian Gymkhana	-	-
National team
Years	Team	Caps	Goals
2005–2012	England	126	(56)
2005–2012	Great Britain	70	(24)
Medal record
Men's field hockey
Representing England
Champions Trophy
Silver medal – second place	2010 Mönchengladbach	Team
European Championship
Gold medal – first place	2009 Amsterdam	Team
Bronze medal – third place	2011 Mönchengladbach	Team

James Tindall (born 22 April 1983) is a former English international field hockey player. He was part of the England and Great Britain from January 2005 until the end of 2012 and competed at the 2008 Summer Olympics and the 2012 Summer Olympics. He has 126 England caps and 56 goals, as well as 70 Great Britain caps and 24 goals.

== Biography ==
Tindall is from Virginia Water, Surrey and spent his first two his seasons playing club hockey for at Old Georgians from 2003 to 2005, having been part of Surbiton's youth setup. He was named as the Hockey Writers Club Player of the Year in 2005.

He joined Surbiton Hockey Club for the start of the 2005–2006 season, scoring 24 goals in his debut season and while at Surbiton, represented England at the 2006 Commonwealth Games in Melbourne was part of the England team that won the European Championship in 2009, achieved bronze in 2011, and won silver in the 2010 Champions Trophy. He also competed at the 2010 Commonwealth Games.

Tindall was selected for the 2008 Summer Olympics in Beijing and infamously was given a yellow card in the 1–1 draw against Canada at the 2008 Olympics by flipping his opponent over his head. He was part of the silver medal winning England team that competed at the 2010 Men's Hockey Champions Trophy in Mönchengladbach, Germany.

Tindall while still with Surbiton, represented Great Britain at the 2012 Olympic Games in London in the men's tournament.

Centralised training for the England and GB hockey teams limited his club appearances in subsequent seasons but when he was not included in the post-Olympics squad in Autumn 2012, he was given an opportunity to recapture some of his earlier career form. He finished the 2012/13 season as the 2nd top goalscorer in the Men's England Hockey League Premier Division with 18 goals. Work commitments and injuries limited Tindall to 12 league appearances in the 2013/14 season but he still managed 9 goals for a Surbiton team which eventually finished 4th in the league. He also made one appearance in the NOW:Pensions Men's Cup and scored twice.

Tindall returned to Old Georgians in 2014/15, as part of the Weybridge club's aim to return to the Men's England Hockey League from the South League Premier. Despite their 2nd-place finish in that season, the following campaign saw them promoted and they finished a respectable 5th place in the 10-team Conference West. During this season he achieved a total of 100 goals in the three seasons of his second stint at the club.

Tindall was part of the Old Georgians team that won two league and cup doubles during the 2021-22 season and 2022-23 seasons.

Tindall left Old Georgians to join Indian Gymkhana for the 2023-24 season.
