= Ben Fox (field hockey) =

English field hockey player (born 2001)

Personal information
- Born: 15 September 2001 (age 24) England

Sport
- Sport: Field hockey
- Position: Defender
Senior career
Years	Team	Caps	Goals
2018–2021	Sevenoaks	-	-
2020–2023	Exeter Univ	-	-
2023–2026	Wimbledon	-	-
National team
Years	Team	Caps	Goals
2025	England	15	-

Ben Fox (born 15 September 2001) is an English field hockey player who plays as a defender for the England men's national field hockey team.

== Biography ==
Fox was educated at Marlborough House School and Eastbourne College and studied Economics at the University of Exeter.

He began playing hockey at Sevenoaks Hockey Club before he went to Exeter and while at university played for the University of Exeter Hockey Club in the Men's England Hockey League. Fox progressed through the England U21 and Great Britain U21 teams in 2022

He signed for Wimbledon Hockey Club for the start of the 2023–24 and in 2025, was added to Great Britain's centralised programme.

Fox made his England debut on 19 February 2025 during the Men's FIH Pro League against India and was part of the England team that was selected for the 2025 Men's EuroHockey Championship in Mönchengladbach, where England finished in sixth place.
