= James Carson (field hockey) =

Welsh field hockey player (born 1994)

Personal information
- Born: 29 April 1994 (age 32)

Sport
- Sport: Field hockey
- Position: Forward
Senior career
Years	Team	Caps	Goals
–	Cardiff & Met	-	-
–2018	Reading	-	-
2018–2019	Exeter	-	-
2019–2020	Beerschot	-	-
2020–2026	Old Georgians	-	-
National team
Years	Team	Caps	Goals
2015–2023	Wales	100	(67)

James Christopher Carson (born 29 April 1994) is a Welsh international field hockey player who plays as a forward for Wales. He competed for Wales at two Commonwealth Games.

== Biography ==
Carson plays club hockey in the Men's England Hockey League Premier Division for Old Georgians, along with his two older brothers. He was selected to represent Wales at the 2018 Commonwealth Games in Gold Coast.

At the end of the 2018 season, he left Reading for the University of Exeter Hockey Club.

Carson joined Old Georgians in 2020 and was part of the Old Georgians team that won two league and cup doubles during the 2021-22 season and 2022-23 seasons and the league title during the 2023-24 season.

He was selected to represent Wales at the 2022 Commonwealth Games in Birmingham and the 2023 Hockey World Cup. He became the first player to score a goal for Wales at a Hockey World Cup, during the team's 5-1 loss to Spain on 15 January 2023.

He won another Premier league title with Old Georgians in 2026.
