= James Albery (field hockey) =

English field hockey player (born 1995)

Personal information
- Full name: James Peter Albery
- Born: 2 October 1995 (age 31) Hertfordshire, England
- Height: 5 ft 5 in (165 cm)

Sport
- Sport: Field hockey
- Position: Defender/Midfielder
Senior career
Years	Team	Caps	Goals
2008–2015	Cambridge City	-	-
2015–2019	Beeston	-	-
2019–2026	Old Georgians	-	-
National team
Years	Team	Caps	Goals
2013–2016	England & GB U-21	33	(2)
2017–present	England & GB	10	(0)
Medal record
Men's field hockey
Representing England
EuroHockey Championship
Silver medal – second place	2023 Mönchengladbach
Commonwealth Games
Bronze medal – third place	2022 Birmingham	Team

James Peter Albery (born 2 October 1995) is an English field hockey player who plays as a defender or midfielder for Old Georgians and the England and Great Britain national teams. He competed at the 2024 Summer Olympics.

== Biography ==
Albery attended Heath Mount and The Leys School, Cambridge and in the Upper Sixth was Head Boy. He played hockey for Cambridge City and Beeston before joining Old Georgians in the Men's England Hockey League Premier Division for the 2015 season.

Albery made his senior England debut on 2 March 2017 against South Africa, in Cape Town, South Africa. He won a bronze medal with England in the Men's tournament at the 2022 Commonwealth Games in Birmingham.

Albery helped Old Georgians complete the league and cup double during the 2022–23 season. He won a silver medal with England at the 2023 Men's EuroHockey Championship in Mönchengladbach.

He was selected to represent Great Britain at the 2024 Summer Olympics. The team went out in the quarter-finals after losing a penalty shootout to India.

He Captained and won another Premier league title with Old Georgians in 2026.
