= Liam Sanford =

English field hockey player (born 1996)

Personal information
- Born: 14 March 1996 (age 30) Wegberg, Germany
- Height: 1.83 m (6 ft 0 in)
- Weight: 80 kg (176 lb)

Sport
- Sport: Field hockey
- Position: Defender
Senior career
Years	Team	Caps	Goals
–2017	Team Bath Buccaneers	-	-
2017–2019	Reading	-	-
2019–2026	Old Georgians	-	-
National team
Years	Team	Caps	Goals
2014–2016	England & GB U21	23	-
2017–present	England & GB	76	(0)
Medal record
Men's field hockey
Representing England
EuroHockey Championship
Silver medal – second place	2023 Mönchengladbach
Bronze medal – third place	2017 Amstelveen
Commonwealth Games
Bronze medal – third place	2018 Gold Coast	Team
EuroHockey Junior Championship
Bronze medal – third place	2014 Waterloo

Liam Sanford (born 14 March 1996) is an English field hockey player who plays as a defender for Old Georgians and the England and Great Britain national teams. He competed at the 2020 Summer Olympics and 2024 Summer Olympics.

== Biography ==
Sanford began playing hockey for Wycombe Hockey Club and the RAF before joining Team Bath Buccaneers. Sanford became the first-ever Team Bath Buccaneers men's player to represent England Hockey at senior level when he helped his country to a 5–2 win over South Africa in Cape Town.

In 2017, Sanford joined Reading in the Men's England Hockey League Premier Division for the 2017–18 season, and while there represented England and won a bronze medal at the 2018 Commonwealth Games in Gold Coast.

He transferred to Old Georgians for the 2019–20 season. Sanford earned a call-up to the Great Britain Olympic squad for the delayed 2020 Olympics Games in Tokyo.

Sanford helped Old Georgians win the league and cup double during the 2022-23 season and the league title during the 2023-24 season.

He was selected to represent Great Britain at the 2024 Summer Olympics. The team went out in the quarter-finals after losing a penalty shootout to India.

He won another Premier league title with Old Georgians in 2026.
