= Andy Bull (field hockey) =

Scottish field hockey player

Personal information
- Born: 3 February 1992 (age 34) Bury, England

Sport
- Sport: Field hockey
- Position: Defender
Senior career
Years	Team	Caps	Goals
2009–2010	Brooklands	-	-
2010–2014	Loughborough Students'	-	-
2014–2015	East Grinstead	-	-
2015–2016	Pinoké	-	-
2017–2018	Beerschot	-	-
2018–2019	Royal Wellington	-	-
2019–2025	Old Georgians	-	-
National team
Years	Team	Caps	Goals
2010–2015	England	5	-
2014	Great Britain	4	-
2019–2023	Scotland	46	(3)
Medal record
Men's field hockey
Representing England
Champions Trophy
Silver medal – second place	2010 Mönchengladbach	Team
Representing Scotland
European Championship II
Silver medal – second place	2021 Gniezno	Team

Andrew Peter Bull (born 3 February 1992) is a British field hockey player who represented England and Great Britain before representing the Scottish national team at the 2022 Commonwealth Games.

== Biography ==
Bull was born in Bury, England, educated at Holy Cross College and studied at Loughborough University.

He was part of the silver medal winning England team that competed at the 2010 Men's Hockey Champions Trophy in Mönchengladbach, Germany.

After several years playing on the continent in Belgium and the Netherlands, he signed for Old Georgians Hockey Club in the Men's England Hockey League for the 2019/20 season. On his return and by virtue of having a Scottish grandmother, Bull was able to switch allegiance to Scotland.

He played for Scotland at the 2019 Men's EuroHockey Championship. In 2022 he was selected to represent Scotland at the 2022 Commonwealth Games in Birmingham, England, in the men's tournament.

In 2023, Bull announced his retirement from international hockey, although he continued to play for Old Georgians. He had earned 46 caps.
