= Tom Carson (field hockey) =

English field hockey player (born 1990)

Personal information
- Born: 29 June 1990 (age 36)

Sport
- Sport: Field hockey
- Position: Forward
Senior career
Years	Team	Caps	Goals
2013-2018	Reading	-	-
2018–2019	Beerschot	-	-
2019–2026	Old Georgians	-	-
National team
Years	Team	Caps	Goals
2013–2018	England & GB	77	(23)
Medal record
Representing England
World League
Bronze medal – third place	2014 New Delhi	Team

Tom Carson (born 29 June 1990) is an English international field hockey player who played as a forward for England and Great Britain.

== Biography ==
Carson is the oldest of four brothers, all of whom attended Wellington School, Somerset, where their father was a boarding housemaster. His younger brother James Carson has represented Wales in international hockey. In January 2014 he won a bronze medal at the 2012–13 Men's FIH Hockey World League Final in New Delhi.

He played club hockey for six years, including two years as captain for Reading in the Men's England Hockey League Premier Division. He played in Belgium during the 2018–19 season for Beerschot.

Carson also played for University of Exeter. while he was a student at the University of Exeter he founded YoungOnes Apparel, a fashion company which began by making and selling onesies. He appeared on an episode of Dragons' Den, where they were offered £75,000 by Duncan Bannatyne, which they ultimately turned down.

Carson joined Old Georgians for the 2019/20 season and was part of the Old Georgians team that won two league and cup doubles during the 2021-22 season and 2022-23 seasons and the league title during the 2023-24 season.

He won another Premier league title with Old Georgians in 2026.
