= Nicholas Park (field hockey) =

English field hockey player

Nick Park
Personal information
- Born: 8 April 1999 (age 27)

Sport
- Sport: Field hockey
- Position: Midfielder
Senior career
Years	Team	Caps	Goals
2016–2018	Reading	-	-
2018–2020	Nottingham Trent University	-	-
2019-2020	Beeston	-	-
2021–2026	Surbiton	-	-
National team
Years	Team	Caps	Goals
2017–2019	England & GB U-21	36	(0)
2022–present	England & GB	2	(0)
Medal record
EuroHockey Championship
Silver medal – second place	2023 Mönchengladbach

Nicholas Park (born 8 April 1999) is an English field hockey player who plays as a midfielder for Surbiton and the England and Great Britain national teams. He competed at the 2024 Summer Olympics.

== Biography ==
Park played hockey for Reading, Nottingham Trent University and Beeston before joining Surbiton in the Men's England Hockey League Premier Division for 2021/2022 season.

While at Surbiton, Park made his senior England debut against Spain on 4 February 2022 and won a silver medal with England at the 2023 Men's EuroHockey Championship in Mönchengladbach.

He was selected to represent Great Britain at the 2024 Summer Olympics. The team went out in the quarter-finals after losing a penalty shootout to India.

Park was part of the Surbiton team that won the league title during the 2024–25 Men's England Hockey League season.
