= Lindum Sports Club Ground =

Cricket ground in England

Coordinates: 53°14′17.77″N 0°31′44.69″W

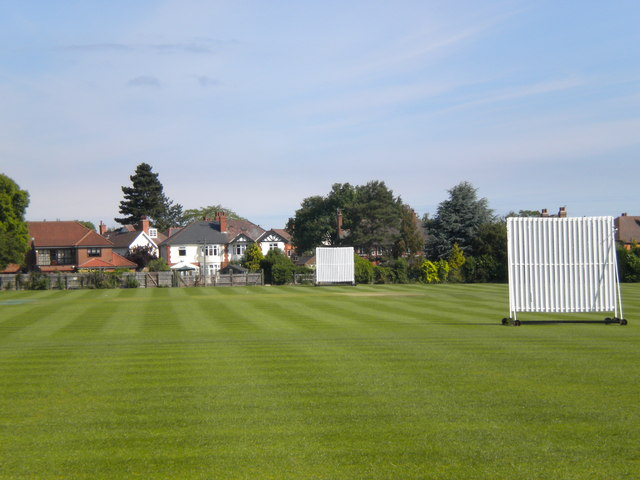
- Interactive map of Lindum Sports Club Ground

Ground information
- Location: Lincoln, Lincolnshire
- Country: England
- Establishment: 1861 (first recorded match)

Team information
Lincolnshire	(1907-1914, 1924-1937, 1948-1950, 1956-2007)
Minor Counties	(1969)
Minor Counties North	(1979)
- As of 17 August 2010; Source: Ground profile

Lindum Sports Club Ground is a cricket ground in Lincoln, Lincolnshire. The first recorded match on the ground was in 1861, when Lincolnshire played an All England Eleven. Lincolnshire played their first Minor Counties Championship match at the ground in 1907 against Staffordshire. Lincolnshire used the ground during a number of periods during the 21st century, playing their final Minor Counties Championship match at the ground in 2000 against Cumberland. The first MCCA Knockout Trophy watch played the ground saw Lincolnshire play Bedfordshire in 1996. From 1996 to 2007, the ground held 4 MCCA Knockout Trophy matches, with the final match played on the ground to date against Lincolnshire and Staffordshire.

The ground has held a single first-class match, when a combined Minor Counties team played the touring New Zealanders in 1969.

The ground has also held a single List-A matches. The first List-A match came in the 1974 Gillette Cup when Lincolnshire played Surrey. In 1979, Minor Counties North used the ground as a home venue against Kent in the Benson and Hedges Cup. From 1974 to 2004, the ground hosted 6 List-A matches. The final List-A match held on the ground came in the 2nd round of the 2004 Cheltenham & Gloucester Trophy when Lincolnshire played Glamorgan.

In local domestic cricket, the ground is the home of Lindum Cricket Club who play in the Lincolnshire Cricket Board Premier League.

In the summer of 2013 Lindum Sports Club gained funding from Sport England and England Hockey to put down an all weather astro-turf pitch. With this new facility in place Lincoln Hockey Club moved to play their matches at the ground, as they used to up to the 1980s when the game of field hockey was played on grass. In 2015, this club merged with Lincoln Roses Hockey Club to form Lindum Hockey Club, another club based at the Lindum Sports Ground, and this new club is now based here.
