= Dan Shingles =

Field hockey player

Personal information
- Born: 5 July 1986 (age 40) London, England

Sport
- Sport: Field hockey
- Position: Midfielder / Defender
Senior career
| Years | Team | Caps | Goals |
| –2013 | Southgate | - | - |
| 2013–2018 | Reading | - | - |
| 2018–2026 | Old Georgians | - | - |
National team
| Years | Team | Caps | Goals |
| 2012–2016 | GB | 17 | (0) |
| 2012–2016 | England | 53 | (2) |

Dan Shingles (born 5 July 1986) is an English field hockey player who plays as a midfielder for Old Georgians. He represented the England and Great Britain national teams from 2012 to 2016.

== Biography ==
Shingles played for club hockey for Southgate and Reading in the Men's England Hockey League Premier Division. While at Reading, Shingles was selected as a reserve for Great Britain at the 2016 Summer Olympics in Rio.

Shingles appeared in the World Cup and two EuroHockey Championships for England.

At the end of 2016, Shingles announced his international retirement having played 53 times for England and 17 times for Great Britain. He became the head of hockey at St George's College, Weybridge.

Shingles joined Old Georgians in 2018. He was part of the Old Georgians team that won two league and cup doubles during the 2021-22 season and 2022-23 seasons and the league title during the 2023-24 season. He won another Premier league title with Old Georgians in 2026.
