= Henry Weir =

English field hockey player (born 1990)

Personal information
- Born: 13 February 1990 (age 36) Croydon, England
- Height: 1.76 m (5 ft 9 in)
- Weight: 75 kg (165 lb)

Sport
- Sport: Field hockey
- Position: Defender
- Club: Old Georgians
Senior career
Years	Team	Caps	Goals
–2010	Crewe Vagrants	-	-
2010–2011	Brooklands MU	-	-
2011–2013	Loughborough Students	-	-
2013–2021	Wimbledon	-	-
2021–2026	Old Georgians	-	-
National team
Years	Team	Caps	Goals
2012–present	England & GB	185	(6)
Medal record
Men's field hockey
Representing England
EuroHockey Championship
Bronze medal – third place	2017 Amstelveen
Commonwealth Games
Bronze medal – third place	2014 Glasgow	Team
Bronze medal – third place	2018 Gold Coast	Team
Hockey World League
Bronze medal – third place	2014 New Delhi	Team

William Henry Weir (born 13 February 1990) is an English field hockey player who played for the England and Great Britain national teams. He competed at the 2016 Summer Olympics.

== Biography ==
Weir moved to Crewe aged 11 and started playing junior club hockey for the Crewe Vagrants before moving to Brooklands MU in 2010 and then on to Loughborough Students' from 2011 to 2013. While at Loughborough, Weir made his international debut against India in December 2012 at the Melbourne Champions Trophy.

He joined Wimbledon in 2013 and played for England in the men's hockey tournament at the 2014 Commonwealth Games where he won a bronze medal.

Still at Wimbledon, Weir represented Great Britain at the 2016 Olympic Games in Rio de Janeiro and represented England and won a bronze medal at the 2018 Commonwealth Games in Gold Coast.

He missed out on the 2020 Olympic Games after breaking his ankle in a Great Britain training session.

In 2021, Weir left Wimbledon in the Men's England Hockey League Premier Division for Old Georgians.

Weir was part of the Old Georgians team that won two league and cup doubles during the 2021-22 season and 2022-23 seasons and the league title during the 2023-24 season.

He won another Premier league title with Old Georgians in 2026.
