= James Gall (field hockey) =

English field hockey player

Personal information
- Born: 20 May 1995 (age 31) Frimley, Surrey, England
- Height: 1.68 m (5 ft 6 in)
- Weight: 63 kg (139 lb)

Sport
- Sport: Field hockey
- Position: Midfielder
Senior career
Years	Team	Caps	Goals
2012-2014	Surbiton	-	-
2014–2015	Beeston	-	-
2015–2017	University of Nottingham	-	-
2017–2026	Surbiton	-	-
National team
Years	Team	Caps	Goals
2013–2016	England & GB U21	36	-
2017–present	England & GB	94	(5)
Medal record
Men's field hockey
Representing England
Commonwealth Games
Bronze medal – third place	2018 Gold Coast	Team
EuroHockey Championship
Silver medal – second place	2023 Mönchengladbach
EuroHockey Junior Championship
Bronze medal – third place	2014 Waterloo

James Richard Gall (born 20 May 1995) is an English field hockey player who plays as a midfielder for Surbiton and the England and Great Britain national teams. He competed at the 2020 Summer Olympics.

== Biography ==
Gall was educated at Cranleigh School, Surrey and began his hockey career with Surbiton, making his league debut in 2016. He played for England under-21 in the 2013 and 2016 Junior World Cups and won a bronze medal at the 2014 European under-21 championships.

He then played for Beeston, joining in September 2014 and the University of Nottingham from 2015. He joined the Great Britain's centralised programme in 2017.

Gall made his senior debut for England versus South Africa in March 2017 and was a member of the Great Britain squad which won the 2017 Sultan Azlan Shah Cup Final in Ipoh, Malaysia, on 6 May 2017 – the first time either Great Britain or England had won this title since 1994.

Gall re-joined Surbiton for the 2017-18 season and represented England and won a bronze medal at the 2018 Commonwealth Games in Gold Coast.

He was selected to represent Great Britain for the delayed 2020 Olympic Games in Tokyo. He won a silver medal with England at the 2023 Men's EuroHockey Championship in Mönchengladbach.

Gall was part of the Surbiton team that won the league title during the 2024–25 Men's England Hockey League season.
