= George Pinner =

British field hockey player (born 1987)

Personal information
- Born: 18 January 1987 (age 39) Ipswich, Suffolk, England
- Height: 1.93 m (6 ft 4 in)

Sport
- Sport: Field hockey
- Position: Goalkeeper
Senior career
Years	Team	Caps	Goals
–2006	Ipswich	-	-
2006–2014	Beeston	-	-
2014–2019	Holcombe	-	-
2019–2025	Old Georgians	-	-
National team
Years	Team	Caps	Goals
2009–2021	England & GB	195	(0)
Medal record
Men's field hockey
Representing England
European Championships
Bronze medal – third place	2017 Amstelveen
World League
Bronze medal – third place	2014 New Delhi	Team
Champions Trophy
Silver medal – second place	2010 Mönchengladbach	Team
Commonwealth Games
Bronze medal – third place	2014 Glasgow	Team
Bronze medal – third place	2018 Gold Coast	Team

George Christopher Pinner (born 18 January 1987) is an English former field hockey player who played as a goalkeeper for Old Georgians and from 2009 to 2021 played for the England and Great Britain national teams. He competed at the 2016 Summer Olympics.

== Biography ==
Pinner, born in Ipswich, played club hockey for Ipswich until 2006 when he joined Beeston in the Men's England Hockey League Premier Division. While at Beeston, he made his senior international debut in 2009 against the Netherlands and his tournament debut at the 2011 Champions Trophy. He was the reserve goalkeeper at the 2012 Olympic Games.

In June 2012 he was one of seven GB hockey athletes to pose for the centerfold of Cosmopolitan magazine as part of a campaign to raise awareness of male cancers and the Everyman cancer charity. Pinner represented England in the 2014 Commonwealth Games in Glasgow, where he won a bronze medal.

After the Commonwealth Games, Pinner joined Holcombe for the 2014/15 season and won goalkeeper of the tournament for Great Britain at the 2016 Champions Trophy before heading off to Rio for his first Olympics as the first choice goalkeeper at the 2016 Olympic Games.

In 2017 Pinner married England international Jo Hunter and represented England and won a bronze medal at the 2018 Commonwealth Games in Gold Coast.

On 30 May 2019 it was announced that he was joining Old Georgians ahead of their first season in the Men's England Hockey League Premier Division.

On 4 November 2021 he announced his retirement from International Hockey. At Old Georgians, Pinner was part of the team that won two league and cup doubles during the 2021-22 season and 2022-23 seasons and the league title during the 2023-24 season.

At the end of the 2025 season, he retired from all hockey.
