= Conor Williamson =

English field hockey player

Personal information
- Full name: Conor Michael Williamson
- Born: 20 December 2001 (age 24) Esher, Surrey, England

Sport
- Sport: Field hockey
- Position: Defender
- Club: Bloemendaal
Youth career
- Team
- –: Surbiton
Senior career
Years	Team	Caps	Goals
–2020	Surbiton	-	-
2020–2023	University of Nottingham	-	-
2023–2026	Surbiton	-	-
2026–present	Bloemendaal	-	-
National team
Years	Team	Caps	Goals
2019–2022	England & GB U21	16	(2)
2023–present	England & GB	68	(2)
Medal record
Men's field hockey
Representing England
EuroHockey Championship
Silver medal – second place	2023 Mönchengladbach

Conor Michael Williamson (born 20 December 2001) is an English field hockey player who plays as a defender for Dutch Hoofdklasse club Bloemendaal and the England and Great Britain national teams. He competed at the 2024 Summer Olympics.

== Club career ==
Williamson came through the youth ranks of Surbiton and played for University of Nottingham for three years while attending university. He returned to Surbiton in 2023. Williamson was part of the Surbiton team that won the league title during the 2024–25 Men's England Hockey League season. He signed for Dutch Hoofdklasse club Bloemendaal in 2026.

== International career ==
Williamson made his England debut at the four Nations Invitational in Barcelona. A month later, he played in England's 2023 EuroHockey Championship. He was named Men's Junior Performance Player of the Year at the 2023 England Hockey Awards. He won a silver medal with England at the 2023 Men's EuroHockey Championship in Mönchengladbach.

He represented Great Britain at the 2024 Summer Olympics. The team went out in the quarter-finals after losing a penalty shootout to India.
