= Old Georgians Hockey Club =

English field hockey team

Old Georgians
- Full name: Old Georgians Hockey Club
- Short name: OGHC
- League: Men's England Hockey League
- Founded: 1995; 31 years ago
- Colors: Maroon and sky blue

Personnel
- Coach: Ashley Jackson (player coach), Chris Bowen, Brett Garrard, Leigh Maasdorp (Director of Hockey), Natalie Turner (physiotherapist), Ralph Day (S&C coach), Colin Huet (video analyst)
- Chairman: Noel Doran
- Manager: Jonny Stephens (Men's 1s)
- Website: Club website

Old Georgians Hockey Club (OGHC) is an English professional field hockey club based in Addlestone, Surrey. The club was founded in 1995 and the men's team are the current English champions. The club currently has six men's teams (including 2 veterans team) and four ladies teams. The junior section is the OGHC Dragons.

== History ==
In 2019, the men's first team won the Hockey League Conference East and subsequent promotion play off tournament to earn promotion to the 2019-20 Premier Division. This is the first time in the club's history that they played in the elite (tier one) division of the Men's England Hockey League.

The men's first team secured their first ever Premier Division title (with two games to spare) when winning the 2021–22 Premier Division. The success continued a remarkable rise in English hockey because the team had only been promoted into the league at the start of 2019. The teams then went on to secure a league and cup double after winning the 2022 England Hockey Men's Championship Cup.

In 2023, Old Georgians successfully defended their Premier League title after beating Holcombe 5–1 in the play off final. They then completed their second successive double after winning the 2023 Men's Cup. In 2024, Old Georgians secured a third successive league championship defeating Surbiton 3-1 in the play off final, as well as winning the National Indoor title for the first time, defeating Wimbledon Hockey Club in the final. They also finished in third place in the EHL tournament recording notable victories against Mannheimer HC, Waterloo Ducks H.C., and Rot-Weiss Köln.

During the 2025–26 season the club won their fourth title in five seasons after defeating Wimbledon 3–2 in the Premier Division finals.

== Players ==
=== Men's First Team Squad 2025–26 season ===
- 1. James Mazarelo (goalkeeper)
- 2. Pablo Usoz Jr.
- 3. Henry Weir
- 4. Liam Sanford
- 5. David Ames
- 6. Kyle Marshall
- 8. Tom Carson
- 9. James Carson
- 10. Henry Croft
- 11. Dan Shingles
- 13. Sam Ward
- 15. Phil Roper
- 16. Edward Carson
- 17. Chris Griffiths
- 18. James Albery (captain)
- 19. Chris Proctor
- 20. Ashley Jackson
- 21. Thabang Modise
- 23. David Condon
- 24. Ian Sloan
- 77. Alan Forsyth

== Major National Honours ==
National champions

- 2021–22 Men's League Champions
- 2022–23 Men's League Champions
- 2023–24 Men's League Champions
- 2025–26 Men's League Champions

Tier 1 Cup winners

- 2021–22 Men's Cup winners
- 2022–23 Men's Cup winners

== Notable players ==
=== Men's internationals ===
Extended content

Player	Events	Notes/Ref
(England) James Albery	Oly (2024), CG (2022), WC (2023), EC (2023, 2025)	
(Scotland) Andy Bull	CG (2022), EC (2021)	
(Wales) James Carson	CG (2022)	
(England) Tom Carson		
(Wales) Andy Cornick		
(England) Henry Croft		
(England) Chris Griffiths	Oly (2020), CG (2022)	
(England) Ashley Jackson		
(Republic of Ireland) Kyle Marshall	Oly (2024)	
(Scotland) Lee Morton	Oly (2024), CG (2022)	
(England) George Pinner		
(England) Phil Roper	EC (2025)	
(England) Liam Sanford	Oly (2020, 2024), WC (2023), EC (2025)	
(England) Dan Shingles		
(England) James Tindall		
(England) Samuel Ward	Oly (2020, 2024), CG (2022), WC (2018, 2023), EC 2023, 2025)	
(England) Henry Weir		

Key

- Oly = Olympic Games
- CG = Commonwealth Games
- WC = World Cup
- CT = Champions Trophy
- EC = European Championships
