= Tim Nurse =

English field hockey player

Personal information
- Full name: Timothy Nurse
- Born: 11 May 1999 (age 27) Bouremouth, England

Sport
- Sport: Field hockey
- Position: Midfielder
Senior career
Years	Team	Caps	Goals
2017–2020	Team Bath Buccaneers	-	-
2020–2026	Surbiton	-	-
National team
Years	Team	Caps	Goals
2022-present	England	15	(0)
2022-present	GB	14	(2)
Medal record
Men's field hockey
Representing England
EuroHockey Championship
Silver medal – second place	2023 Mönchengladbach

Timothy Nurse (born 11 May 1999) is an English field hockey player, who was named in the 2024 Summer Olympics team.

== Biography ==
Nurse, born in Bournemouth, was educated at Ballard School (New Milton) and studied Sports Performance under a King Scholarship at the University of Bath. He was part of the Team Bath Buccaneers Hockey Club while at University. He helped the Great Britain U21 team win consecutive Sultan of Johor Cups in 2017 and 2018.

Nurse made his England debut on 19 February 2022 against Argentina in the FIH Pro League and played in the 2023 EuroHockey Championships in Mönchengladbach, Germany, winning a silver medal.

He was named in the Great Britain squad at the 2024 Summer Olympics. The team went out in the quarter-finals after losing a penalty shootout to India.

Nurse was part of the Surbiton team that won the league title during the 2024–25 Men's England Hockey League season.
