= Timperley Hockey Club =

English field hockey club

- Full name: Timperley Hockey Club
- League: Men's England Hockey League; Women's England Hockey League North Conference
- Founded: 1886; 139 years ago
- Home ground: Timperley Sports Club, Stockport Road
- Website: Official website

Timperley Hockey Club is a field hockey club that is based at the Timperley Sports Club between Timperley and Altrincham, England. The club was founded in 1886 and runs eight men's teams and six women's teams in addition to various junior teams.

== History ==
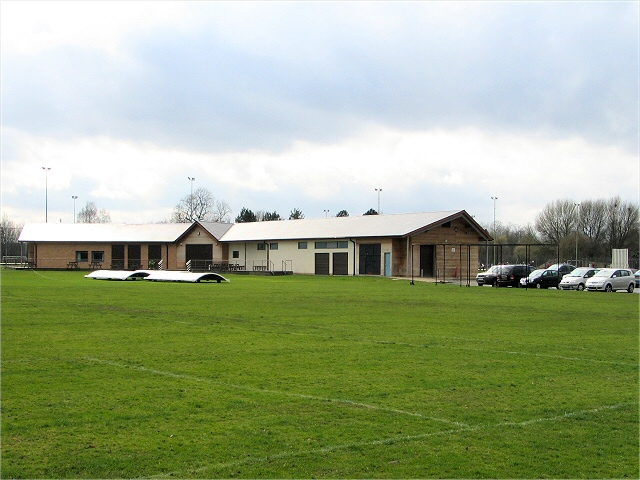
Timperley sports club in 2006

The club was formed in 1886 with a men's section. The secretary R.R. Deane was advertising for fixtures the following year in 1887 and reported membership of over 40 by September 1888.

In 1898 the club's balance sheet was recorded as £5, 18s, 7d, due to increased membership and it was stated that the club won more games than any other team from the North, having played 20, won 10 and drawn 7.

In 1908, the club played at Stockport Road for the first time. Shortly before World War I the honorary secretary was Arthur G. Dyson and club member Alfred Ernest Boucher was killed during the war.

A women's section was added in 1922/23.

In 1987, the club celebrated its centenary with a tournament at their ground in Stockport Road and a European tour to Eindhoven.

The men's first XI were promoted to the Men's England Hockey League for the 2025–26 Men's England Hockey League season following a successful campaign winning the Conference North league in 2024/25.
