= Lindum Hockey Club =

Field hockey club in Lincoln, England

- Nickname: The Yellow Submarine
- Founded: 2015
- League: Men's England Hockey League; Yorkshire & North East Hockey League
- Based in: Lincoln, England, Lincolnshire, England
- Home ground: Lindum Sports Club Ground
- Colours: Yellow shirts, Navy shorts, Red Socks
- Captain: Cameo Jefferson, Louie Sadler
- Website: lindumhockey.co.uk

Lindum Hockey Club is a field hockey club located in Lincoln, England. The club was formed in the Spring of 2015, a merger between Lincoln Hockey Club and Lincoln Roses Hockey Club. Lindum Hockey Clubs plays its home games at the Lindum Sports Association on St Giles Avenue in Lincoln.

The Men's 1st Team play in the Men's England Hockey League Conference North following relegation from Division 1 North in the 24-25 season, while the Ladies 1st Team play in the Women's Yorkshire & North East Hockey League Premier Division. The majority of the other teams compete in the Yorkshire & North East Hockey League. As Lincoln's only field hockey club, the club fields seven men's teams, including one development side, five ladies' teams, two veterans sides, one mixed team, and has a well established junior hockey section.

== History ==
Despite being founded only relatively recently, the club's history stretches back over a combined 200-year period. Lincoln Roses Hockey Club began life as a part of the Sports Club of Rose Brothers (Gainsborough) Limited, a manufacturer of sweet wrapping equipment. Gainsborough Rose Hockey Club, as they were known at the time following an amalgamation with Gainsborough Ladies Hockey Club, started to take on organised hockey with the formation of the Lincolnshire Hockey League. Later, with the advent of artificial turf becoming the de facto playing surface in the sport, facilities were sought in Lincoln and in time a formal link with Lincoln University saw the club renamed Lincoln Roses Hockey Club.

Lincoln Hockey Club was built on the foundations of Lincoln Ladies Hockey Club, started in 1898. The club's first links with the Lindum Sports Association came about in 1946 where the men's club was also formerly created - named Lincoln Imps Hockey Club. The Lindum Sports Association was to be the base for both hockey clubs over the next 43 years before the need to use artificial turf took the club elsewhere in the city for their home games. In 1980 the two clubs were merged to become a single entity, continuing to be called Lincoln Imps Hockey Club, until 1998 when it became simply Lincoln Hockey Club. Olympic medalist and England / Great Britain International player Georgie Twigg is a former player of Lincoln Hockey Club.

== The Merger ==
An attempt to arrange a merger between Lincoln Roses Hockey Club and Lincoln Hockey Club in the mid to late-2000s proved unsuccessful and the two clubs continued to provide opportunities to play hockey and promote the sport side by side in the same city. In 2013 a purpose-built artificial turf hockey pitch was laid at the Lindum Sports Association, in part funded by England Hockey and Sport England. Some of the logic behind the funding of the new facility was that two hockey clubs would benefit and so both Lincoln Hockey Club and Lincoln Roses Hockey Club were playing most of their home games at the same location. In early 2014, a team consisting of Gary Johnson, John Harrison, Mark Sadler and John Sisman put in place the plans and foundations for a merger of the two clubs. Extraordinary General Meetings were called at both clubs to present a vision for the future of hockey in Lincoln and, with that, both clubs formerly dissolved on 8 June 2015 and, on the same date, Lindum Hockey Club was created in their place.

== Branding ==
In order to strike a balance between the two clubs, the decision was made to start afresh with branding. The new club name wouldn't involve any merging of the two former names but instead adopt the name used at the Lindum Sports Association, which is also used by other member clubs using the same facilities (the Lindum Cricket Club and Lindum Squash Club). The logo was inspired by Lindum Cricket Club's logo; the Roman of the 9th Roman Legion who founded Lindum Colonia.

== Current season ==
The season saw an affiliation in excess of 350 players. Lindum teams played primarily at the Lindum Sports Association but also at Yarborough Leisure Centre.

The Men's 1st Team competed in the Men's England Hockey League Division 1 North for the first time but were relegated back to Conference North with two games to spare, finishing in 9th place (out of 10). Sam Dixon was the team's top scorer with 13. The Ladies 1st Team consolidated their position in the Women's Yorkshire & North East Hockey League Premier Division with a 7th-placed finish (out of 12), improving from the previous season's 9th-place.

There was further success throughout the club with the Men's 2nd and 3rd Teams achieving promotion as champions of Yorkshire & North East Hockey League Division One and YNE Peak & Wold Division One, respectively. The Men's 2nd Team will compete in the Yorkshire & North East Hockey League Premier Division for the 25-26 season, whilst the Men's 3rd Team will compete in the Yorkshire & North East Hockey League Yorkshire Division Two. The Ladies 2nd Team were also crowned champions of Yorkshire & North East Hockey League Yorkshire Division Two and will compete in Yorkshire & North East Hockey League Yorkshire Division One next season.
