= Barford Tigers Hockey Club =

English field hockey club

- League: Men's England Hockey League; Midlands Women's Hockey League; Midlands's Men's Hockey League
- Founded: 1966; 60 years ago
- Home ground: Hamstead Hall Academy, Craythorne Ave, Handsworth Wood, Birmingham B20 1HL

Barford Tigers Hockey Club is a field hockey club that is based at Hamstead Hall Academy in Birmingham. The club was founded in 1966.

The club runs five men's teams, two ladies teams and two veterans teams. with the men's first XI playing in the Men's England Hockey League Division 1 North.
