= Southgate Hockey Centre =

Coordinates: 51°39′23″N 0°08′20″W

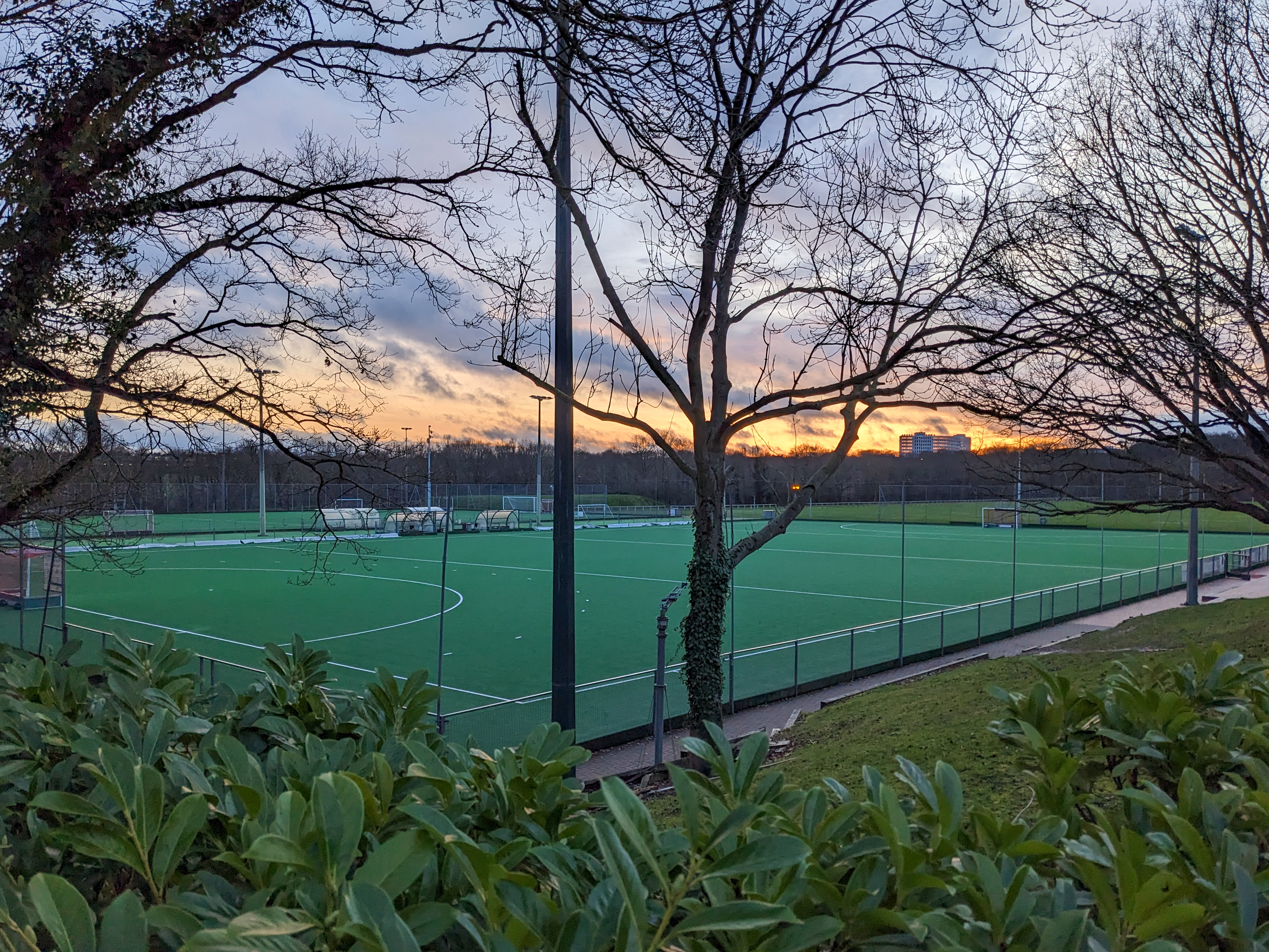
Southgate Hockey Centre in January 2023

Southgate Hockey Centre is a sports ground in Trent Park in North London, near Oakwood. The Centre is home to Southgate Hockey Club and Trent Park Running Club. Southgate Hockey Club's top men's and ladies' teams play in the England Hockey National League, and its numerous other teams cater for players from 6 to 86. The Centre hosts international tournaments during the year. The all-weather pitches are hired by numerous local football clubs and teams as their winter training facility. Nordic Walking UK hold regular courses throughout the year.

It has two artificial grass pitches (one water, one sand dressed), and a grass area (which can fit three football pitches). The upper part of the building contains a bar and catering facilities, which are used for sports/social purposes, and are hired by external organisations for parties and conferences.

The land is owned by Berkeley Homes, and is currently leased to Southgate Sports and Leisure Trust (SSLT). An agreement with the original landowners, Middlesex University, allowed SSLT, in 1997–98, to build the pitches and clubhouse as part of a £1.4 million project, partly funded (£626,000) by the Sports Lottery Fund.
