= University of Bristol Hockey Club =

Field hockey club

- Full name: University of Bristol Hockey Club
- League: Men; Men's England Hockey League; Women; West Premiership
- Home ground: Coombe Dingle Sports Complex, Coombe Lane, Bristol BS9 2BJ

University of Bristol Hockey Club is a field hockey club that is based at the University of Bristol, the club plays at the Coombe Dingle Sports Complex on Coombe Lane in Bristol.

The club runs five men's teams with the first XI playing in the Men's England Hockey League Division One South and seven women's teams with the first XI playing in the Premiership of the West Hockey League.

Both the men's and women's teams also compete in the British Universities and Colleges Sport South Premier.
