= Ashmoor Hockey Club =

Hockey club in Devon, England

Ashmoor Hockey Club is a hockey club that was formed in 2003, based primarily in Ashburton, Devon, England.

The club has had to play its league matches at Isca College Exeter since around 2007, because the 3G pitch at their home base of South Dartmoor Community College did not meet the new requirements of the International Hockey Federation (FIH) or England Hockey Board, but moved to King Edward VI Community College (KEVICC) in Totnes for the 2017–18 season after their new astro turf was built, so they rarely play at ISCA College during their home matches. They play in purple, green and white hooped socks, white shorts, and purple shirts.

The Men's 1st team (formed when the club was established) has risen the equivalent of 8 divisions in their 7 seasons as a team winning 3 leagues and finishing strongly in the other seasons. The Ladies' team won Channel 2B in their first season as a team. The majority of Ashmoor's success however comes from their junior teams. The most notable successes have been the 5 National Indoor appearances and the National U15 Plate run that took them to a final with Teddington Hockey Club (the oldest club in the world), which they lost 3 – 0. During the 2018–19 season the Men's 1s will be playing the in Verde ReCreo Hockey League Premiership, which is one league above the Men's Conference West League (National League)

The Men's 2nd Team won promotion to the Men's Verde Recreo Hockey League Southern 2 during the 2017–18 season coming behind Devonport Service in the second with a goal difference of 69 in the 2017–18 Verde Recreo Men's Hockey League South West 1, which this season will be the highest the 2s have ever played in league history.

Many players have represented Devon county and played for the West of England teams, and several players have made the full England Junior squads, the Wales squads, and 6 being selected for the UK Lions.

As of 2023-24 they compete in the Men's national league western division.

== Senior teams ==
As of the 2023–24 season Ashmoor has six senior teams:

Team	League	Division	Captain	Vice-Captain
Men's 1st XI (Ashmoor Men)	England Hockey League	West Men's Conference	Jamie Bishop	Richard Ashworth
Men's 2nd XI (Ashmoor Men)	England Hockey League	Men's Division 2 South	Reuben Stanley	Neil Titford
Men's 3rd XI (Ashmoor Men)	England Hockey League	Men's Riviera Division 2	John Lilley	Rik Fox
Men's 4th XI Dev (Ashmoor Men)	England Hockey League	Men's Riviera Division 3 Dev	Jamés Bromfield	Dave Stokes
Women's 1st XI (Ashmoor Women)	England Hockey League	Women's Petroc Division 1	Jordan Wright	Emily Hunter
Women's 2nd XI Dev (Ashmoor Women)	England Hockey League	Women's Petrov Division 3	TBC	TBC

== 2018–19 season ==
The 2018–19 season began on 22 September with the Ashmoor Ladies kicking of their league campaign, Ashmoor Ladies won 4–2 at home to Okehampton in the West Club Women's Hockey League Petroc Division 1 and Ashmoor Ladies 2 lost away to Dawlish Hockey Club 6–0 in the West Club Women's Petroc Division 2.

The Verde ReCreo Men's hockey league got underway on Saturday 29 September with Ashmoor away to Wotton Under-Edge away at the Katherine Lady Berkeley School in the Verde ReCreo Men's Hockey League Premiership, Ashmoor A with play Caradon home at King Edward VI Community College (KEVICC) in the Verde ReCreo Men's Hockey League Southern 2, Ashmoor B will play Plymouth University C at home at ISCA in the Verde ReCreo Men's Hockey League South West 2 and Ashmoor C will travel East Devon D at St Peters in the Verde ReCreo Men's Hockey League South East 3.

The Verde ReCreo Men's Hockey League Season gets underway on 29 September with Ashmoor defeating Wotton Under-Edge 2–1 in the Premiership, Ashmoor A narrowly lost 2–1 to Caradon, Ashmoor B got off to a stunning start winning 12–0 against Plymouth University C in the South west 2 League ending the 3s losing streak via 22 matches and Ashmoor C also got off to a good start winning 2–0 against East Devon D in the South East 3 League.

The Ladies 1s travelled to Honiton Hornets and came away with a 6–1 win in the Petroc Division 1 and the Ladies 2 only just lost 4–2 to Okehampton 3 in the Petroc Division 2

During the next week on 6 October 2018, Ashmoor ladies Ashmoor men's 1s played host to Penarth winning 2–1 against their opponents who they had played against last season in the Championship, Ashmoor A travelled to Penzance A and came away with a 3–0 win, while Ashmoor B had no match due to Tavistock B pulling out of the South West Division 2 league and Ashmoor C played against a newly formed Taunton Vale E side and only lost 4–3 in a tight match. the Ladies 1s played host to Newton Abbot Ladies and lost via 2–1 and the Ladies 2 lost 3–1 to ISCA 5s at the University of Exeter (Water Based Pitch)

The following week on Saturday 13 October Ashmoor Men's once against came away with a narrow win this time away to Witchurch 3–2, with Richard Ashworth scoring 2 and Jamie Bishop scoring the other on his return from University, Ashmoor A also got an outstanding 4–2 win over Camborne School of Mines in the Southern Division 2 league going third in the league during the week, Ashmoor B had another week off as they had no match due to Tavistock B pulling out, but are scheduled to play Caradon A next week in the South West Division 2 League, while Ashmoor C were scheduled to play Sidmouth and Ottery D, but the match was in the end postponed due to Sidmouth Shockingly pulling out of the South East Division 3 League but will travel to face Bridgwater D next week in Bridgwater.

On 20 October Ashmoor men's 1s played host to Firebrands from Bristol and came away with a 3–1 in the Verde ReCreo Premiership the week after winning at Whitchurch the week before, Ashmoor A travelled to Bodmin to face Bodmin Hockey Club and came away with a 1–1 draw, whilst Ashmoor B lost 2–1 away to Caradon A at Lux Leisure Centre in South West Division 2 and Ashmoor C travelled to face Bridgwater D and narrowly lost 2–0 at Chilton Trinity School, but the match was marked with Forward and vice-captain Jamés Bromfield out-skilling five of Bridgwater's players and their captain Steve Morrish decided to go and take the ball himself at the start of the second half pushback.

The week after during 27 October Ashmoor men's 1s faced Westbury UB away and comfortably won the match 30 to maintain their top place in the Verde ReCreo men's premiership league, Ashmoor A played host to Bude from Cornwall in the Southern 2 league lost the match 4–3 which was a close encounter and Ashmoor B played host to Penzance A and put three goals past them winning 3–1 in the South West division 2 league, Ashmoor C weren't in league action that week.

On 3 November Ashmoor men's 1s travelled to former Men's Conference West side from Bristol Clifton Robinson's and drew 1–1 in the Premiership league, Ashmoor A took the trip to the University of Saint Mark and Saint John in Plymouth and taught a Plymouth Marjon C side a lesson in hockey via winning the match 6–0, Ashmoor B were back in Cornwall and this time playing at Duchy against Duchy B and winning the match 5–0 and Ashmoor men's 4s played host to newly relegated Minehead B who were in South East Division 2 last season and lost the match 3–1 in a very close encounter, next week on 10 November Ashmoor men's 1s travel to Exeter to face University of Exeter A on water based pitch, Ashmoor men's A play host to O.P.M with AShmoor men's B playing host to Okehampton A and Ashmoor men's C playing East Devon D at home.

During the week after on 10 November Ashmoor men's took the trip to Exeter to face University of Exeter A on the water based pitch and they ended losing the match 4–2 which became their first defeat of the season and their first in the Verde ReCreo men's Premiership league, Ashmoor men's A were at home to O.P.Ms and the score was 4–2 in the match but this one was to Ashmoor A and Ashmoor men's B were also home too against Okehampton A in the South west division 2 league and the match ended in a draw 1–1 and Ashmoor men's C had their worst defeat of the season losing 7–2 to a young East Devon D side in the South East division 3 league, the week after on 17 November Ashmoor men's 1s will play host to Cheltenham hoping to main their stay at the top of the men's Premiership league, Ashmoor A will travel to University of Exeter to face ISCA C on the sand based pitch in the men's Southern 2 division with Ashmoor men's B will be at home to Torbay B from the English Riviera in the south West Division 2 league and Ashmoor men's C travel to Taunton to face Taunton Vale E at Taunton Vale Sports Club.

The weekend on 17 November Ashmoor men's 1s put their 4–2 defeat against University of Exeter A in Exeter behind them winning 3–2 at home to Cheltenham, Ashmoor men's A took the trip to Exeter this time to the University of Exeter to face ISCA C in the Southern 2 division league and the result didn't go their way thus losing 3–0 to a strong ISCA C side, Ashmoor men's B played host to Torbay B from the English Rivera and taught the young team in Maroon a lesson of how hockey is supposed to be played winning the match 6–0 in the South West Division 2 league and Ashmoor men's C took the trip to Taunton Vale Sports Centre to face Taunton Vale E losing 4–1 despite taking an early lead in the first half of the match. Next week Ashmoor men's a taking the trip to the famous city of Bath to face Team Bath Buccs A in the men's Premiership Division winning 3–0, Ashmoor men's A are played host to University of Exeter F who are also new to the men's Southern 2 division and losing the match 5–1 with Ashmoor men's B taking the trip to Plymouth to face O.P.Ms at the University of Saint Mark Saint John where they won by a score of 8–4 to maintain second place in the Verde ReCreo South West Division 2 and Ashmoor men's C are not in league action the following week.

The next month on Saturday 1 December, two weeks before the league break, Ashmoor men's 1s played host to Cardiff University and won the match comfortably 3–0 to maintain their top spot at the Verde ReCreo men's Premiership, Ashmoor men's A put their 5–1 defeat of University of Exeter F behind them and travelled up to newly promoted Devonport Services, the away side took an early lead and went in being 1–0 up at half time, but Devonport thought back and won the match 3–1, with Ashmoor C Vice-Captain Jamés Bromfield making his Southern division 2 debut and keeping a clean sheet in the first half, Ashmoor men's B hosted PSGSOB C (Plympton Grammar School Old Boys) at home and put nine goals past the time in black and yellow winning the match 9–2, Ashmoor men's C played host to Bridgwater D in the Verde ReCreo Men's South East 3 division and lost the match 6–0. The week after is the final league matches of the first half before the break with Ashmoor mwen's 1s travelling to Plymouth to face Plymouth Marjon in the derby match in the men's Verde Recreo Premiership, Ashmoor men's A play host to Plymouth University A in the men's Southern 2 division, Ashmoor men's B and Ashmoor men's C are not in league action until the new year.

The week after, on 8 December, Ashmoor men's took the trip to face Plymouth Marjon at the University of Saint Mark and Saint John and won the match 2–1 with near a last minute goal to stay at the top of men's Verde Recreo Premiership going into the league break, Ashmoor men's played host to Plymouth University A with Ashmoor men's C Vice-captain Jamés Bromfield playing in goal again at this time making his home debut in the Men's Verde ReCreo South 2 division and they lost the match 2–1, but Bromfield pulled of some amazing saves to keep the score low for the Uni side, Ashmoor men's B and Ashmoor men's C were not in league action until the new year that week too.

During the beginning of the new year on 12 January 2019 in the second half of the season Ashmoor men's A took the trip up to Cornwall to face Caradon at the Lux Leisure park venue in the men's Southern division and came away 2–2 this time as last time they lost the match 2–1 at home, Ashmoor men's B faced the inexperience team of Plymouth University C again this time away and won 12–1 this time, the last being 12–0 to Ashmoor B in the men's South West 2 division and Ashmoor men's C took the trip to Exeter to face East Devon D and the last time the sides met Ashmoor men's C won the match 2–0, but this time it was East Devon D who would take centre stage winning 3–2 despite Ashmoor men's C taking an early lead. Next week on 19 January Ashmoor men's 1s league match is postponed due to the men's under 18 National club indoor finals in Telford, Ashmoor men's A is cancelled due to the same event, Ashmoor men's B are not in the league action that week and Ashmoor men's C are playing host to Taunton Vale E at ISCA college in the men's South East 3 division.

On 21 January Ashmoor men's 1s travelled to Ysgol Stanwell School to face a Penarth side sitting 11 points in 3rd in the Premiership table, Ashmoor were without a few of their younger players including England Under-18 Samuel Taylor who was in Telford for the England Under National Finals, Ashmoor 1s came away with a 2–2 this time.

== Alf Dinnie ==
Alf Dinnie is a Welsh hockey player who represents Cardiff & Met Hockey Club and the Wales men's national field hockey team, he represented Wales in the 2018 Commonwealth Games at the Gold Coast in Australia where he wore the number 5 jersey. Dinnie started his career with Ashmoor Hockey Club when the club was formed in 2003 alongside his older brother Jack Dinnie and both attended South Dartmoor Community College both hockey players have been both picked for Devon and UK Lions and have also represented School and Club in both Regionals and Nationals together.

== League finishes ==
Season	Men's 1st XI	Men's 2nd XI	Men's 3rd XI	Men's 4th XI	Ladies' 1st XI	Ladies' 2nd XI
2003–04	1st, South Central District 1	N/A, (Team Not Formed)	N/A, (Team Not Formed)	N/A, (Team Not Formed)	N/A, (Team Not Formed)	N/A, (Team Not Formed)
2004–05	1st, South West Division 1	5th, South Western District 2	N/A, (Team Not Formed)	N/A, (Team Not Formed)	N/A, (Team Not Formed)	N/A, (Team Not Formed)
2005–06	3rd, South Division 2	9th, South West District 1	N/A, (Team Not Formed)	N/A, (Team Not Formed)	N/A, (Team Not Formed)	N/A, (Team Not Formed)
2006–07	5th, South Division 2	10th, South West District 1	N/A, (Team Not Formed)	N/A, (Team Not Formed)	N/A, (Team Not Formed)	N/A (Team Not Formed)
2007–08	6th, South Division 2	8th, South Western District 1	N/A (Team Not Formed)	N/A (Team Not Formed)	N/A, (Team Not Formed)	N/A, (Team Not Formed)
2008–09	1st, South Division 2	8th, South Western District 1	6th, South Eastern District 2	N/A, (Team Not Formed)	N/A, (Team Not Formed)	N/A (Team Not Formed)
2009–10	4th, South Division 1	1st, South Eastern District 1	7th, South Eastern District 2	N/A (Team Not Formed)	N/A, (Team Not Formed)	N/A, (Team Not Formed)
2010–11	3rd, South Division 1	7th, South East Division 2	10th, South Eastern District 2	N/A, (Team Not Formed)	5th, Sedgemoor Division 1	N/A, (Team Not Formed)
2011–12	1st, South Division 1	4th, South East Division 2	2nd, South Eastern District 2	N/A (Team Not Formed)	?	8th, Petroc Division 2
2012–13	4th, Conference South	9th, South East Division 1	8th, South East Division 3	N/A (Team Not Formed)	3rd, Petroc Division 2	N/A, (Team Not Formed)
2013–14	4th, Conference South	11th, South East Division 1	10th, South East Division 3	N/A (Team Not formed)	1st, Petroc Division 2	N/A, (Team Not Formed)
2014–15	1st, Conference South	2nd, South East Division 2	2nd, South West Division 2	7th, South East Division 3	10th, Petroc Division 1	11th, Petroc Division 2
2015–16	6th, Championship	7th, South East Division 1	9th South East Division 1	5th South East Division 3	5th, Petroc Division 2	N/A, (Team Not Formed)
2016–17	7th, Championship	5th, South East Division 1	7th, South East Division 1	6th, South East Division 3	2nd, Petroc Division 2	N/A, (Team Not Formed)
2017–18	1st, Championship	2nd, South West Division 1	12, South East Division 1	4th, South East Division 3	6th, Petroc Division 1	N/A (Team Not Formed)
2018–19	1st, Premiership	5th, Southern Division 2	2nd, South West Division 2	5th, South East Division 3	6th, Petroc Division 1	12th, Petroc Division 2
2019–20	5th, Men's Conference West	2nd, Southern Division 2	8th, South West Division 1	8th, South West Division 2	6th, Petroc Division 1	6th, Petroc Division 2
2020-21	N/A, Men's Conference West	N/A, Southern Division 1	N/A, South West Division 1	N/A, South West Division 2	N/A, Petroc Division 1	N/A, Petroc Division 2
2021-22	N/A, Men's Conference West	N/A, Southern Division 1	N/A, South West Division 1	N/A, South West Division 2	N/A, Petroc Division 1	N/A, (Team Not Formed)
2022-23	7th, Men's Conference West	9th, Men's Division 2 South	7th, Men's Riviera Division 1	5th, Men's Riviera Division 2	10th, Petroc Division 1	N/A, (Team Not Formed)
2023-24	8th, Men's Conference West	11th, Men's Division 2 South	10th, Men's Riviera Division 1	5th, Men's Riviera Division 2	4th, Petroc Division 2	N/A, (Team Not Formed)
2024-25	5th, Men's Conference West	1st, Men's Riviera Division 1	5th, Men's Riviera Division 1	8th, Men's Riviera Division 2	1st, Petroc Division 2	N/A, (Team Not Formed)
2025-26	5th, Men's Conference West	4th, Men's Division 2 South	11th, Men's Riviera Division 1	7th Men's Riviera Division 2	4th, Petroc Division 1	N/A, (Team Not Formed)
2026-2027	TBC, Men's Conference West	TBC, Men's Riviera Division 1	TBC, Men's Riviera Division 1	TBC, Men's Riviera Division 2	TBC, Petroc Division 2	TBC, (Team Not Formed)
