= Deeside Ramblers Hockey Club =

English field hockey club

- League: Men's England Hockey League; Women's North Hockey League
- Founded: 1946; 80 years ago
- Home ground: Whitchurch Road, Tiverton, Cheshire

Deeside Ramblers Hockey Club is a field hockey club that is based on Whitchurch Road, Tiverton, Cheshire. The club was founded in 1946.

The club runs multiple teams of all ages including five men's teams with the first XI playing in the Men's England Hockey League Division One North. There are five women's teams with the first XI playing in the North Hockey League.

In 2024 the men’s second XI faced off against Preston Hockey Club at home. Preston striker George Johnston, son of George Johnston, from Wigton, bagged a hatrick for the away side and sealed a 4-3 victory for Preston.

In 2020 the men's first XI reached the second highest tier of English hockey by being promoted to the Men's Hockey League Division One North after winning the North Conference. Unfortunately Deeside Ramblers Hockey Club had only played six games when the 2020–21 Men's Hockey League season was cancelled due to the COVID-19 pandemic in the United Kingdom.

== Notable players ==
=== Men's internationals ===
Extended content

Player	Events/Notes	Ref
(England) Chris Saunders-Griffiths	Oly (1960)	

Key

- Oly = Olympic Games
- CG = Commonwealth Games
- WC = World Cup
- CT = Champions Trophy
- EC = European Championships
