= Leeds Hockey Club =

Hockey club in West Yorkshire, England

- Nickname(s): Cheetahs
- League: Men's England Hockey League; Women's England Hockey League
- Founded: 1934; 91 years ago
- Home ground: Sports Park Weetwood, Outer Ring Road, Leeds LS16 5AU

Leeds Hockey Club is a field hockey club that is based at the Sports Park Weetwood in Leeds, West Yorkshire. The club was founded in 1936 as Rawdon and District Hockey Club. The club runs eight men's teams, with the first XI playing in the Men's England Hockey League Division One North, and six women's teams, with the first XI playing in the Women's England Hockey League Division One North.
