= Teddington School =

Location
- Broom Road; Teddington, London, TW11 9PJ; England; 51°25′24″N 0°18′45″W

Information
- Type: Academy
- Established: 1962; 64 years ago
- Department for Education URN: 138460 Tables
- Ofsted: Reports
- Headteacher: Paul Grills
- Gender: Coeducational
- Age: 11 to 18
- Enrolment: c. 1350
- Houses: Cygnus, Ursa, Delphinus, Phoenix
- Colours: Teal, grey and orange
- Website: www.teddingtonschool.org

Teddington School is a co-educational state school for ages 11–18 (11-16 for the main school and 16-18 for the sixth form), located in Teddington in the borough of Richmond upon Thames. It has had academy status since 2012, and is operated by the Bourne Trust. It opened a co-educational sixth form in 2014.

== Performance ==
As with other schools, latest exam results and related data are published in the Department for Education's national tables.

An Ofsted inspection in February 2014 rated the school as "Good", stating that pupils were making "strong progress", and that the "teaching standard was good".

In the 2015-year school leaving examinations the school exceeded its target results, however concerns were raised with the fact that around 40% of the school's sixth form AS-level examinees had failed to achieve pass grades in the subjects of Mathematics and Biology. John Wilkinson the School's newly appointed Headteacher addressed the concerns by stating that the results in this regard had under-performed because the Biology syllabus needed to be restructured, and the Mathematics results had been impaired by the admission of sixth-form students with lower GCSE grades than was standard educational practice, citing the need for schools to "be brave" in such matters, and not play safe in pursuance of short-term results statistics.

In September 2018 the Government's Education and Skills Funding Agency issued Teddington School with a formal "Financial Notice to Improve" due to failing to set a balanced budget, and concerns over its financial control.

In November 2021, Teddington School's Ofsted rating was returned to 'Good'. When Kathy Pacey became the Head of nearby Orleans Park School in 2022, the Bourne Trust appointed Paul Grills as Teddington School's new Headteacher.

== History ==
The school opened in 1962 as the Teddington Secondary School, a single-sex school, taking over the senior boys of Stanley Road School when it ceased to cater for the full age-range, as well as the boys from Twickenham Technical School. Pupils from the former St Mark's School in St Marks Road joined Teddington School in April 1963.

From the late 1960s to the mid-1980s it was called Teddington Boys' School, the name being changed to Teddington School on the admission of girls in 1985 for the first time.

In 2010 under a central government public works programme entitled Building Schools for the Future, the original mid-20th century design school buildings on the Broom Road site and its attached hardcourt sports fields of an athletics field, football pitch and tennis courts, were demolished, and a new school building and sports ground were constructed by the builder Mace Group Limited at a cost of £36 million. The new building was given a BREEAM "Excellent" utility rating and was opened on 13 May 2011 by Vince Cable, the Member of Parliament for Twickenham, who in a speech praised its "brilliant architectural design", and how its structure "explores new ways of learning, creating a learning village around a social square". Richard Weeks, the Headteacher of the school at the time, stated that the new building "created a new learning environment physically and culturally which is very much more appropriate to the needs of the 21st Century".

The new school was initially designated as a "Specialist Visual Arts College", but was reclassified to Academy status in August 2012.

A new two-storey building was constructed for an additional 240 pupils in 2014 with the inauguration of a sixth form at the school in 2014, in line with Richmond Borough Council's secondary school education policy.

In September 2017 on his appointment to the post of Chief Executive of the Richmond West Schools' Trust, John Wilkinson was re-designated as the Teddington School's "Executive Headteacher",

== Exchange programme ==
The school has run an exchange programme with the Geschwister-Scholl-Schule in Konstanz since 1976.

== Notable alumni ==
- Sandy Abi-Elias, international women's footballer for Lebanon
- Stewart Castledine, professional footballer and television presenter
- Nell Tiger Free, actress
- Tom Ilube CBE, Chair of the Rugby Football Union
- Daniel Khalife, former soldier and prison escapee
- Keira Knightley, actress
- Bill Milner, actor
- Sean Pertwee, actor
- Lenny Pidgeley, professional footballer
