= Indian Gymkhana Hockey Club =

Field hockey club in London

- Full name: Indian Gymkhana Hockey Club
- League: Men's England Hockey League
- Founded: 1916
- Colors: Yellow and Green
- Home ground: The Indian Gymkhana Club; Thornbury Avenue; Osterley; Isleworth, London TW7 4NQ

Indian Gymkhana Hockey Club is a field hockey club that is based at the Indian Gymkhana Club in Isleworth, London, England.

== History ==
The Indian Gymkhana Club was founded in 1916 as a cricket club, with the hockey club being formed later.

In 1984, Kulbir Bhaura was selected to represent Great Britain at the 1984 Summer Olympics and famously won the gold medal four years later in the Field hockey at the 1988 Summer Olympics – Men's tournament at the 1988 Summer Olympics.

In 1991, the club finished runner-up during the 1990–91 England Hockey League season behind Havant Hockey Club.

In 2015 former international players Ian Jennings MBE and Simon Mason were appointed as Directors.

In 2025, the Men's 1st XI reached England Hockey's Tier 1 Championship Cup final (formerly known as the HA Cup) on the 17 May at the end of the 2024–25 season. They lost to Harborne 2-1 in the final.

== Teams ==
The club runs various women's teams, with the Men's first team playing in the Men's England Hockey League.

There are five men's teams and additional teams for women, juniors and a grandmasters team.

== Achievements ==
- 1990–91 Men's League Runner-up

== Notable players ==
=== Men's internationals ===
Extended content

Player	Events	Notes/Ref
(England) Kulbir Bhaura	oly (1988)	

Key

- Oly = Olympic Games
- CG = Commonwealth Games
- WC = World Cup
- CT = Champions Trophy
- EC = European Championships
