= Tiverton, Cheshire =

Village in Cheshire, England

Coordinates: 53.145°N 2.686°W

Tiverton
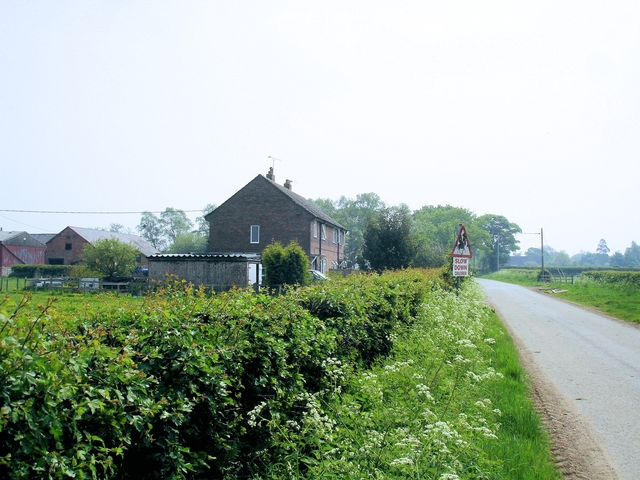
- Ferney Lees Cottages

- Location within Cheshire
- Population: 318 (2011)
- OS grid reference: SJ5461
- Civil parish: Tiverton and Tilstone Fearnall
- Unitary authority: Cheshire West and Chester
- Ceremonial county: Cheshire
- Region: North West
- Country: England
- Sovereign state: United Kingdom
- Post town: TARPORLEY
- Postcode district: CW6
- Dialling code: 01829
- Police: Cheshire
- Fire: Cheshire
- Ambulance: North West
- UK Parliament: Chester South and Eddisbury

Tiverton is a village and former civil parish, now in the parish of Tiverton and Tilstone Fearnall, in the Cheshire West and Chester district and ceremonial county of Cheshire in England. It had a population of 406 in 2001, reducing to 318 at the 2011 census. Tiverton became a civil parish in 1866, on 1 April 2015 the parish was abolished to form Tiverton and Tilstone Fearnall; part also went to Tarporley. The former civil parish of Tiverton and the current parish of Tiverton and Tilstone Fearnall both include the hamlet of Four Lane Ends.

== See also ==
- Listed buildings in Tiverton, Cheshire
