= Oxted Hockey Club =

English field hockey club

- Full name: Oxted Hockey Club
- League: Men's England Hockey League; Surrey Ladies Hockey League
- Founded: 1936; 89 years ago
- Home ground: Oxted School, Oxted, Surrey

Oxted Hockey Club is a field hockey club that is based at Oxted School, in Oxted and Caterham School in Caterham, Surrey, England. The club was founded in 1936, originally as the Oxted Women’s Hockey Club.

== History ==
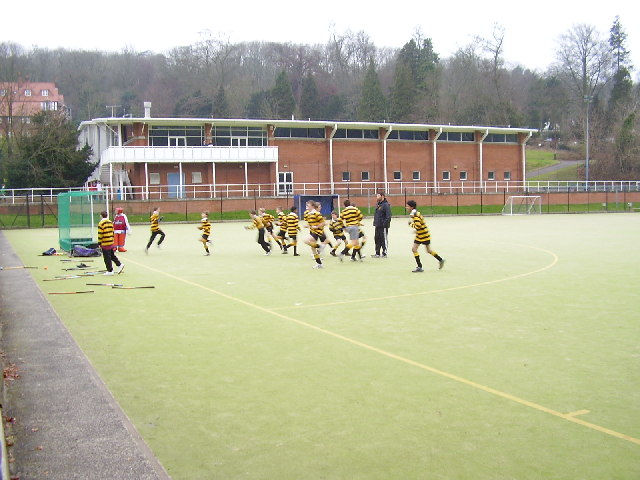
Caterham School Hockey pitch in 2006

The club runs six men's teams with the first XI playing in the Men's England Hockey League Division One South and three women's teams with the first XI playing in the Women's South League.

During the 2020–21 Men's Hockey League season, the league was cancelled due to COVID-19 pandemic but the men's team defeated Bowdon 3–2 in the final of the Men's Championship Cup.

== Honours ==
- Men's Championship Cup winners 2020–21

== Men's First Team Squad 2025–26 season ==
- 1. Max Christopher (goalkeeper)
- 2. Josiah Wood
- 3. Ollie Drummond
- 4. Owen Williamson (captain)
- 5. Lucas Ward
- 6. Lewis Wilcher
- 7. Rob Mugridge
- 8. Matthew Crookshanks
- 12. Jack Webb
- 13. Josh Nurse
- 14. Chris Porter
- 16. Archie Phillips
- 17. Thomas Finnegan
- 18. Jamie Batten
- 21. Damian Knott
- 22. Charlie Axford
- 23. Peter Jarvis
- 25. Oliver Bennett
- 26. Isaac Dale

== Notable players ==
=== Men's internationals ===
Extended content

Player	Events	Notes/Ref
(New Zealand) Dominic Dixon	Oly (2024)	
(Republic of Ireland) Nick Page	Oly (2024)	
(South Africa) Bradley Sherwood	Oly(2024)	
(Wales) Peter Swainson	CG (2014)	

Key

- Oly = Olympic Games
- CG = Commonwealth Games
- WC = World Cup
- CT = Champions Trophy
- EC = European Championships
