= University of Nottingham Hockey Club =

English field hockey club

- Full name: University of Nottingham Hockey Club
- League: Men's England Hockey League; Women's England Hockey League
- Home ground: David Ross Sports Village, Beeston Lane, NG7 2RD & Nottingham Hockey Centre, University Boulevard, NG7 2PS

University of Nottingham Hockey Club is a field hockey club that is based at the University of Nottingham, the club plays at two grounds; the David Ross Sports Village and the Nottingham Hockey Centre.

The club runs seven men's teams with the first XI playing in the Men's England Hockey League Premier Division and the second XI playing in the Conference Midlands It also has seven women's teams with the first XI playing in the Women's England Hockey League Premier Division.

== Teams ==
=== Ladies First Team Squad 2024–25 season ===
- 1. Isabel Field (goalkeeper)
- 22 Katie Alexander
- 129. Ciara Comley
- 135. Monica Watkins (captain)
- 145. Kea Murray
- 147. Sienna Dunn
- 154. Freya Diamond
- 165. Amelia Pollock
- 169. Freya Robinson
- 175. Julie Read
- 176. Kate Barker
- 183. Amie Hunt
- 196. Poppy Dring-Richardson
- 233. Star Horlock
- 234. Lucy Millington
- 241. Maelona Rees

== Notable players ==
=== Men's internationals ===
Extended content

Player	Events	Notes/Ref
(United States) Sean Cicchi		
(England) Robert Clift		
(England) James Gall		
(United States) Mohan Gandhi		
(England) Harry Martin		
(England) George Pinner		
(England) Tom Sorsby		
(Wales) Ieuan Tranter		
(England) Conor Williamson	EC (2023)	

Key

- Oly = Olympic Games
- CG = Commonwealth Games
- WC = World Cup
- CT = Champions Trophy
- EC = European Championships

=== Women's internationals ===
Extended content

Player	Events	Notes/Ref
(England) Darcy Bourne		
(England) Esme Burge		
(England) Jo Hunter		
(Germany) Nike Lorenz		
(England) Alex Malzer		
(England) Anne Panter		

Key

- Oly = Olympic Games
- CG = Commonwealth Games
- WC = World Cup
- CT = Champions Trophy
- EC = European Championships
