= Old Cranleighan Hockey Club =

Field hockey club

- Full name: Old Cranleighan Hockey Club
- Nickname(s): OC's
- League: England Hockey League
- Founded: 1928; 98 years ago
- Home ground: Portsmouth Road, Thames Ditton, Surrey
- Website: https://oldcranleighanhc.com/

Old Cranleighan Hockey Club also known as OC Hockey Club is a field hockey club that is based on Portsmouth Road, in Thames Ditton, Surrey. The club was founded in 1928 for former pupils of Cranleigh School and was originally a men's only club based on the fact that the school was a boys only school. Girls started at the school during the 1970s and the club introduced ladies teams some years later.

The club runs 17 teams including ten men's teams with the first XI playing in the Men's Open Conference East. There are seven women's teams with the first XI playing in the London Women's Division 1.

In 2020 the men's first XI reached the second highest tier of English hockey by being promoted to the Men's Hockey League Division One South after winning the West Conference. Unfortunately OC Hockey Club had only played six games when the 2020–21 Men's Hockey League season was cancelled due to the COVID-19 pandemic in the United Kingdom.
