= Oxford Hawks Hockey Club =

English field hockey club

Oxford Hawks
- League: Men's England Hockey League; Women's England Hockey League
- Founded: 1938; 88 years ago
- Home ground: Banbury Road North

The Oxford Hawks Hockey Club are a field hockey club based inBanbury Road North in Oxford. It was founded in 1938. Some fixtures are held at other venues including Gosford Hill School, St Edward's School, Oxford and Headington School, Oxford.

== The Club ==
The club runs eight men's and eight women's teams and also has a large junior section. Both first XI teams have progressed in recent years with the men's first XI playing in the Men's England Hockey League Division One South and the women's first XI playing in the England Hockey League Investec Conference West

== History ==
The Beginning

In April 1938 and subsequently, the Oxford County Council Staff Hockey Club held several meetings. The outcome of these meetings was that, in order to increase membership, they decided to form an entirely new club, to be called the Oxford Hawks.

The inaugural meeting of this new club took place that the King's Arms Hotel on 12 September 1938 – Major C. H. B. Shepherd was elected president. John Critchley was the club's first captain and Frank Hughes the secretary.

The club chose blue and white for its new colors, with the intention of changing the colors for the 1939–40 season. Subscription: £1/1/- per season (16/- for those under 20 years of age on Oct. 1st.) and a playing fee of 6d. per home match.

Oxford Hawks Hockey Club was now in its first season but the club soon had to bring progress to a halt in 1939, as war broke out. The club ceased to operate from 1939 to 1945, but was restarted thanks to the strenuous efforts of C W Hough, F M Hughes, L Carden and others.

In the early days, the team, with an incomplete fixture list, played their home matches at various grounds around the city, but always returned to take tea in the “backroom” at the Kings Arms Hotel, Holywell. This pub is still popular today with students and tourists. This “backroom” was treated as H.Q. for many years before and after the war and holds a special place in the history of the club, since it was from here that Hawks made their first impressions on local hockey.

By the late 1940s, at a time when many were re-establishing their lives after the warring years, a settled ground had been obtained from the city, at Banbury Road North. The “backroom”, though still H.Q., had become redundant for after-match teas, and these were now taken in a small restaurant just below the Old Bank in the High Street, owned and run by the Co-operative Society. This restaurant, The Angel, likely derived its name from the old coaching inn, The Angel Inn, Oxford's busiest until the mid-19th century.

Matches were occasionally played on Sunday, and after a dip in a converted urn to clean up, tea taken at the Angel, teams such as Bournemouth were then taken to the Territorial Drill Hall, near the New College Cricket Ground in Manor Road.

Source: Club Newsletter 1963, G.J. Wilsdon

School Links

Magdalen College School has played a large part in the formation of Oxford Hawks Hockey Club, being one of the few local schools, in the early days, which played hockey. A famous figure of local hockey, Major C.H.B. Shepherd, former president and patron of the club, was a master at the school and ran their hockey. He did a great amount of umpiring for both school and Oxford Hawks and because of this influence, a large number of people with hockey interests were channeled into the club. Until sometime in the late 1970s, all club captains were first team captains, and all were ex-Magdalen College School boys.

In 2011, Magdalen College School strengthened its link with Oxford Hawks, as together with Oxford High School, they partnered the club in the project to build a new artificial turf pitch on the site. The £900,000 project also involved resurfacing the existing turf.

The Early Years

After many years taking visitors on an after-match conducted tour of Oxford, the Hawks were presented with a golden opportunity for buying its own land. In the 1953–54 season, the girls’ school playing field in Five Mile Drive came up for sale at £4,000. In those days this vast sum of money was way out of the club's reach, but for the help of the local residents. They virtually guaranteed the club the money to save the land from residential building, which would no doubt have taken place. Much discussion took place, but the offer was turned down because it was felt that the club could not exist without a summer sport and Five Mile Drive was not big enough to include a cricket pitch. This was not the end of the tale, however. The City Council bought the land and Oxford Hawks moved there as tenants.

Now the use of pitches was more stable, clubhouse facilities were still a problem. The Angel was closing for teas, the Kings Arms was developing into the center of sport in Oxford and was therefore becoming crowded with the City Rugby and Cricket Clubs visiting, along with other sports and Hawks once again began searching for more pleasant surroundings. These were found in a room above the main bars at the Victoria Arms in Walton Street where teas were taken for several seasons, with the added luxury of its own private bar, until the forced move to the Cherwell Hotel in Cutteslowe.

Tragedy

Tragedy hit Oxford Hawks in 1954, when Richard Munsey, the "leading light" of the club in the early days, was killed in a car accident. Dick, along with his girlfriend and another passenger, were returning from the club's dinner dance at the Kings Arms, Bicester. The accident had a great effect on the club since Dick was "the club" at the time and organized most things, both on and off the field. After the tragedy, the club slowly got back on its feet and set up a fund in the name of Dick Munsey. It gave a cup to Magdalen College School to present each year to the pupil that did the most for hockey at the school.

This tradition continues today, much to the pleasure of the clubs older members, who remember how much Dick Munsey did for Oxford Hawks. Dick's great-great-niece Emily Munsey also played at Hawks and kept the Munsey link to the club going strong.

The Middle Years

In the late fifties, the City Sports Club was formed, comprising rugby, hockey and tennis sections with its own purpose-built facility. However, it soon became apparent that if the club were to compete and hold its own, separate facilities were needed. This was brought about by one man - Geoff Wilsdon. Geoff had the drive and the right connections, with minimal financial support to bring about Hawks own club facilities in the grounds of the Cherwell.

The club was financed by a debenture scheme of which only one has been redeemed to this day. The land was leased from the Brewery, an old service hut was brought to the site and erected on a brick platform, with a concrete block toilet building and a block kitchen facility added to the side of the hut. Once after a very strong wind and storm, the whole building moved, which caused a panic, but Geoff once again came to the rescue and had it shored up with bulk timbers. At times, to ease financial strain, the club opened on a Sunday lunchtime and it was packed out, most support coming from North Oxford Tennis and Bowls section.

Towards the end of its life the building was rather contemptuously referred to as “that old hut” but at the time it was built, was a very big undertaking for a small club. Many happy hours were passed in the old clubhouse and it remained the club headquarters until Oxford Hawks Hockey Club moved to Banbury Road North.

With the benefit of hindsight the move to BRN was a major and upward turning point for Hawks. Moving into its own Clubhouse adjacent to its own 3 grass pitches was in itself a step forward. It also enabled Hawks - Men only at the time - to eventually form an integrated Ladies section (see later). Further, as the BRN ground was too small for a full sized cricket table, Hawks were in due course able to build their own synthetic turf pitch (the first in Oxfordshire) and have just completed a second. How did the move to BRN come about?

By the mid-1970s, Hawks fielded four men's first teams on Saturdays. The club's clubhouse, known as "The Hut", had become inadequate for the club's needs. According to the cited source, club members supported plans to relocate and develop improved facilities. Paddy Roche, Richard Clarke, Dave Robson, and Bob Phillips were among the members involved in these efforts.

In 1977, Oxford City Council (OCC) was approached by Hawks to see if a site could be found for a sports ground. Coincidentally the Tennis Club (NOLTC) with Bernard Wyatt at the helm, had been in dialogue with OCC for the same purpose - NOLTC played its early summer tennis at the Council owned Alexander grass courts and after the university went down in June, moved to the grass courts at St John's College. NOLTC also wanted a permanent home of its own.

OCC offered Hawks and NOLTC the ground at BRN as a hockey and tennis center. Ladies Etceteras Hockey and Adastral Hockey were already playing at BRN and so had 'vested' interests. In this way, they became part of the new partnership of four clubs under an 'umbrella' club called North Oxford Sports Club. Later, Ladies Etceteras and Adastral Ladies merged with Hawks to become Hawks Ladies but Adastral Mixed is still an independent partner. It took nearly four years from the initial discussions with OCC in 1977 to the opening of the new Clubhouse in 1981. OCC laid eight new grass tennis courts and refurbished three existing hard courts (previously played on by the then defunct Bohemians TC), as well redefining the three grass hockey pitches and putting in drainage. The Clubhouse project was a lengthy process of leases, planning, building specs, grant applications, general funding—and finally construction. The original Clubhouse was designed by past Hawks President Dave Robson, who was still at the helm in the most recent refurbishment. Construction of the Clubhouse was undertaken by Francis Builders of Bicester. The total cost including furnishing was about £36,000. This was funded by a loan from OCC of £20,000, £2,500 from the Sports Council, a small brewery loan from Morrells and Club funds and general fundraising. The 'Hut' was dismantled by Hawks members completing the end of one period in the Hawks history and representing the start of another.

Barcelona

In January 1984, Oxford Hawks’ went to Barcelona to play in the prestigious Los Reyes Tournament, against other European teams.

To arrive and play at a club where membership costs begin at £3,000 was certainly an escape for the players.

Surrounded by an international show jumping arena, a massive polo field and stables, dozens of floodlit tennis courts and many more acres of sporting land, filmed by the local T.V. station, watched by people crowded into the stands. Such was the reputation gained by the side that a second invitation was extended to the club to fill a late vacancy in January 1988.

Jubilee

On Saturday and Sunday 9, 10 September 1989, the club held the “Golden Jubilee Tournament” to mark its 50 years. Chairman John Elliott had hoped to officially open the new artificial turf pitch that weekend—however, due to planning delays, the club only received approval at the end of July, so this was postponed until after September.

The festival was organized by E. Minty, D. Blomley, R. Hubble, P. Bennett, S. Griffiths, T. Abbott, P. Baddeley, J. Elliot, R. Kelly, J. Kaluza, D. Robson, some of whom are still very actively involved in the club. John Kaluza is now employed as the Clubhouse Manager at BRN.

The Recent Years

Neil Biggs and Richard Clarke were instrumental in the laying of the first artificial turf in 1990. Home games and training at Bisham Abbey was impractical and expensive, and it was clear that hockey of the future would be played on artificial turf. Working closely together the plan was hatched, funding raised and pitch delivered. The energy and enthusiasm of both Richard and Neil had galvanized the club towards a clear target and it was delivered. Oxford Hawks were the first club in the area to have artificial turf. Neil and Richard were also heavily involved in the relaying of the artificial turf in 2000 with a sand-dressed surface that plays effectively like a water based pitch.

In 2007, Oxford Hawks, jointly with their N.O.S.C. partners North Oxford Lawn Tennis Club undertook to refurbish the clubhouse at a cost of £300,000. This was completed in 2008 due to the exceptional hard work of Richard Clarke, Neil Biggs, Dave Robson and John Kaluza. During the construction the clubhouse was out of action and Hawks teams had to entertain their opposition at the local Woodstock Arms after matches. On May 10, 2008, Tim Henman, son of longstanding Hawks member Tony, officially opened the clubhouse.

In 2008, Club President Paddy Roche reinstated the President’s Punch Up, a traditional event on the final Sunday before Christmas. Hundreds of members past and present fill the clubhouse for a day where many former members enjoyed the facilities that the newly refurbished clubhouse had to offer. This fixture has remained in the Club Calendar for many years.

In 2011, the Club completed a £900,000 project to build a second artificial turf pitch on the site, as well as resurfacing the existing turf. The project was driven again by Neil Biggs, and was officially opened by the Non-Executive Chairman of England Hockey, Philip Kimberley on Saturday 7 May 2011. The project was made possible by both grants from England Hockey and the National Hockey Foundation, as well as partnership with Oxford High School and Magdalen College School.

Teams at the Club

The need for Oxford Hawks to develop its potential in terms of an active youth policy had long been evident. Finally, in the Jubilee Year 1989, this happened. Posters were distributed to Schools in the hope of encouraging youngsters to come along to the Sunday morning coaching sessions held at the Banbury Road North ground. The response was tremendous - no doubt helped by the success of Great Britain in winning the Olympic Gold, aided by the news that the Club hoped to put down its own artificial turf pitch.

The club now has 250 young hockey players in its Junior Section. Hawks has hosted the venue for England Hockey's ‘Junior Regional Performance Centres, in which the strongest youngsters from the South of England convene for training and assessments.

Some years after the formation of the junior section, in 1990 the ladies clubs Oxford Etceteras and Adastral Ladies merged with Oxford Hawks to create the Ladies’ section. The Ladies currently running 8 teams and the 1st XI were promoted to the National League having won South Division 1 in the 2010–11 season. The Harriers and the Kestrels are development teams, providing the perfect stepping stone between the Junior section and the Adult sides.

The Men's section now run 8 sides, one of which is a veterans’ team.

The Men won the South League in the 91/92 under the captaincy of Neil Abbott but failed to gain promotion to the National League through the play-offs losing a tight and nervy final game to Old Kingstonians. It took another four years until, in the 95/96 season, they won the league again losing only one game all season. They then face the dreaded National League play-offs again. After a mixed set of results they again headed into a one-off deciding game, this time against Hampstead and Westminster, who were playing to retain their place in the top flight. This was one of the most memorable games in the club's history. No goals were scored in the first half. Hawks then went ahead through a Simon Dawson goal 10 minutes into the 2nd half. But the lead didn't last long and two quick goals from Hampstead and Westminster gave them a 2–1 lead, which they held on to until the game had less than two minutes to go. Hawks then equalized through a short corner from Adam Laird. As the seconds ticked away, Laird stole the game with another trademark clinical finish, again from a short corner and Hawks were promoted to the National League.

Hawks enjoyed 11 seasons in the topflight although they had to survive another set of play-offs in 1998. They were finally relegated in 2006–2007 after losing in yet another set of play-off games, this time the opposition being Sheffield. Hawks were relegated for a 2nd time in 3 years in 2008–2009.

The Men's 1s were promoted in 2018–2019 and in 2019–2020. In 2020–21 the Men's 1s are playing in the Men's England Hockey League Division One South, just one tier below the premiership.
