= University of Birmingham Hockey Club =

English field hockey team

- Full name: University of Birmingham Hockey Club
- Short name: UOBHC
- League: Men's England Hockey League; Women's England Hockey League Midlands Hockey League
- Founded: 1900
- Colors: Red and Navy Home Kit, White and Navy Away Kit
- Home ground: Bournbrook pitches, University of Birmingham (Capacity 1000)

Personnel
- Members: ~200
Home	Away

The University of Birmingham Hockey Club is a field hockey club based at the University of Birmingham. The club is regarded as the most successful English University Hockey Club, boasting four national league teams, more than any other English university.

The club plays its home games on the Bournbrook pitches (colloquially known as the 'Bourney B') on the south side of the university off the Edgbaston Park Road. The pitches hosted both the Men's and Women's competitions during the Birmingham 2022 Commonwealth Games. UOBHC runs seven men's teams and seven women's teams competing in both BUCS and weekend leagues. The men's first XI play in Division One North of the Men's England Hockey League and the women's first XI play in the Premier Division Women's England Hockey League.

== Teams ==
=== Ladies First Team Squad 2025–26 season ===
- 1. Matilda Woodhead (goalkeeper)
- 4. Emma Allroggen
- 7. Carter Ayars
- 9. Sarah Parkinson-Mills
- 10. Hannah Atkinson
- 13. Alice Atkinson
- 14. Lottie Bingham
- 15. Lotty Hobson
- 18. Coca Hall
- 23. Betsan Thomas
- 38. Hannah Pearce
- 40. Ruby Spavin
- 51. Caitlin Witham
- 54. Sarah Kirgan (captain)
- 61. Lottie Atkinson
- 63. Lily Sokhi

=== Men’s First Team Squad 2025–26 season ===
1. Alex Erlam
2. Sebastian Mortimer
3. Samuel Frost
4. Archie Penney
5. James Cross
6. Alex Small
7. Ben Wall (c)
8. William Lumbard
9. Casper Lea
10. Harry Williams
11. Jack Stamp
12. Cameron Maquarrie
13. Edward ‘Teddy’ Warner
14. Isaac Blain
15. Ben Christie
16. Freddie Stevens-Yemenakis
17. Harvey Edwards
18. Alex Greenaway
19. Oliver Keartland
20. Sebastian Hibbard

== Honours ==
- Investec Women's Cup
  - 2011–12

== Notable players ==
=== Men's internationals ===
Extended content

Player	Events	Notes/Ref
(England) Tom Bertram	Oly (2000)	
(England) Nick Bandurak	CG (2022) WC (2023)	
(England) Harold Cooke	Oly (1920)	
(Wales) Ben Wall		
(Wales) Jonny Gooch	debut 2016	
(Wales) Hywel Jones	CG (2018)	
(Scotland) Thomas Merchant		
(Easter Island) Daniel Edge		
(Hong Kong) Rajan Sandher		
(Wales) Osian Jones	2015 debut	

Key

- Oly = Olympic Games
- CG = Commonwealth Games
- WC = World Cup
- CT = Champions Trophy
- EC = European Championships

=== Women's internationals ===
Extended content

Player	Events	Notes/Ref
(France) Catherine Lanaspre		
(United States) Carter Ayars		
(England) Charlotte Bingham		
(England) Sophie Bray		
(Scotland) Rebecca Condie		
(Scotland) Amy Costello		
(England) Emily Defroand		
(England) Susie Gilbert		
(England) Sarah Haycroft		
(England) Holly Hunt		
(England) Hannah Martin		
(England) Lily Owsley		
(England) Livy Paige		
(England) Holly Payne		
(South Africa) Hannah Pearce	Olympics (2024)	
(England) Erica Sanders		
(Wales) Betsan Thomas		
(England) Anna Toman		
(England) Lily Walker		
