= Olton & West Warwickshire Hockey Club =

English field hockey team

Coordinates: 52.42931°N 1.80515°W

- Full name: Olton & West Warwickshire Hockey Club
- League: Men's England Hockey League; Women's England Hockey League
- Founded: 1898
- Home ground: West Warwickshire Sports Club, Grange Road

Olton & West Warwickshire Hockey Club (Olton & West Warwick for short) is a field hockey club based at the West Warwickshire Sports Club in Grange Road, Olton, Solihull, West Midlands. The club runs a large number of teams featuring men's, women's, juniors and veteran sides.

Olton & West Warwicks men's first X1 play in the Men's England Hockey League Division One North. and the women's first X1 play in the England Hockey League Investec Conference West.

== History ==
The club was founded in 1898 and joined the Midland Association. The club rented part of the cricket ground from the Olton Cricket Club and George Godfrey was elected as President.

In 1970 new premises at the West Warwickshire Club were opened. The West Warwickshire Club was formed in 1968 following a merger of Olton Cricket and Hockey Club and three tennis clubs, Moseley, Newton and Olton. Initially the hockey club continued by the name Olton, but by 1974 the club was being referred to as the Olton & West Warwickshire Hockey Club.

The women's team have been runner-up in the English league title on two occasions (2002 and 2009).

== Honours ==
The women's team has gained significant honours -

- 2001–02 National League Runner-Up
- 2008–09 National League Runner-up
- 2001–02 Premiership Tournament Champions
- 2000–01 Cup Runner-Up
- 2001–02 Cup Runner-Up

== Notable players ==
=== Men's internationals ===
Extended content

Player	Events/Notes	Ref
(Wales) Martin Brough	1981–1989	
(Wales) James Kyriakides	CG (2014)	

Key

- Oly = Olympic Games
- CG = Commonwealth Games
- WC = World Cup
- CT = Champions Trophy
- EC = European Championships
