= City of Peterborough Hockey Club =

British field hockey club

- League: Men's England Hockey League; Women's East Region Hockey League
- Founded: 2006; 19 years ago
- Home ground: The City of Peterborough Sports Club

City of Peterborough Hockey Club is a field hockey club that is based at The City of Peterborough Sports Club, Bretton Gate, Westwood, Peterborough.

== Teams ==
The club runs eight men's teams and four women's teams, with the women's first XI playing in the Women's East Region Premier Division.

== History ==
The club is a relatively new club only being formed in 1996. However this was as a result of a merger between the Peterborough Town Hockey Club (founded in the 1930s) and the Peterborough Athletic Hockey Club. Despite only being formed in recent times the club has experienced significant success in recent seasons with the men's team reaching the Men's England Hockey League Division One North.

== Notable players ==
=== Men's internationals ===
Extended content

Player	Events	Notes/Ref
(England) Paul Barber	WC (1978), EC (1978), CT (1978)	Peterborough Town

Key

- Oly = Olympic Games
- CG = Commonwealth Games
- WC = World Cup
- CT = Champions Trophy
- EC = European Championships
