= Sevenoaks Hockey Club =

British hockey club

- Full name: Sevenoaks Hockey Club
- League: Men's England Hockey League; Women's England Hockey League
- Founded: 1911; 114 years ago
- Home ground: Hollybush Lane, Sevenoaks (Capacity ~100)

Sevenoaks Hockey Club is a field hockey club that is based at Hollybush Lane in Sevenoaks, Kent. The club was founded in 1911.

The club runs seven men's teams with the first XI playing in the Men's England Hockey League Division One South and eight women's teams with the first XI playing in the Women's England Hockey League Division One South.

== Notable players ==
=== Men's internationals ===
Extended content

Player	Events/otes	Ref
(Wales) John Bennett	EC (2025)	

Key

- Oly = Olympic Games
- CG = Commonwealth Games
- WC = World Cup
- CT = Champions Trophy
- EC = European Championships
