= 2026 Women's FIH Hockey World Cup squads =

This article lists the confirmed squads for the 2026 Women's FIH Hockey World Cup held in Wavre, Belgium and Amstelveen, Netherlands from 15 to 30 August 2026.

== Pool A ==
=== Australia ===
The squad was announced on 6 July 2026.

Head coach: (South Africa) Rhett Halkett

1. Claire Colwill
3. Morgan Mathison
4. Amy Lawton
5. Grace Young
6. Sarah Byrnes
7. Aleisha Power (GK)
10. Abigail Wilson
11. Alice Arnott
13. Makayla Jones
14. Stephanie Kershaw
15. Kaitlin Nobbs (C)
16. Courtney Schonell
17. Lucy Sharman
18. Alana Kavanagh
19. Jocelyn Bartram (GK)
20. Karri Somerville
22. Tatum Stewart
24. Mariah Williams
30. Grace Stewart (C)
31. Neasa Flynn

=== Chile ===
The squad was announced on 17 July 2026.

Head coach: Cristóbal Rodríguez

3. Fernanda Villagrán
4. Doménica Ananías
5. Denise Rojas
6. Fernanda Flores
7. Sofía Filipek
8. María Maldonado
9. Fernanda Arrieta
10. Manuela Urroz (C)
11. Josefa Salas
13. Antonia Orchard
15. Simone Avelli
16. Constanza Palma
17. Francisca Irazoqui
18. Laura Müller
19. Agustina Solano
22. Paula Valdivia
23. Florencia Barrios
28. Natalia Salvador (GK)
29. Antonia Sáez (GK)
31. Constanza Muñoz

=== Japan ===
The squad was announced on 10 July 2026.

Head coach: Akira Takahashi

1. Akio Tanaka (GK)
2. Miyu Suzuki
3. Ikumi Matsu
4. Hanami Saito
5. Nanako Tateiwa
6. Emi Nishikori
7. Mayuri Horikawa
8. Shiho Kobayakawa
9. Mai Toriyama
10. Amiru Shimada
11. Akari Nakagomi
13. Hiroka Murayama
16. Saki Tanaka
17. Miyu Hasegawa
18. Yu Kudo (C, GK)
19. Maho Ueno
21. Rui Takashima
23. Maho Segawa
25. Haruka Kawaguchi
27. Nanami Kaneko

=== Netherlands ===
The squad was announced on 29 July 2026.

Head coach: Raoul Ehren

1. Anne Veenendaal (GK)
3. Rosa Fernig
5. Lisa Post
6. Daantje de Kruijff
7. Xan de Waard
8. Yibbi Jansen
9. Renée van Laarhoven (C)
10. Felice Albers
11. Pien Sanders
12. Luna Fokke
14. Sanne Koolen
15. Frédérique Matla
16. Joosje Burg
17. Marleen Jochems
18. Freeke Moes
19. Marijn Veen (C)
21. Pien Dicke
22. Josine Koning (GK)
34. Eline Jansen
37. Guusje Moes

== Pool B ==
=== Argentina ===
The squad was announced on 9 July 2026.

Head coach: Fernando Ferrara

2. Sofía Toccalino
3. Agustina Gorzelany
4. Valentina Raposo
5. Agostina Alonso (C)
10. María Granatto (C)
13. Cristina Cosentino (GK)
18. Victoria Sauze
20. Sofía Cairó
21. Victoria Granatto
22. Eugenia Trinchinetti
23. Lara Casas
25. Juana Castellaro
26. Paula Ortíz
28. Julieta Jankunas
29. Victoria Miranda
33. Zoe Díaz
40. Mercedes Artola (GK)
43. Emma Knobl
60. Brisa Bruggesser
64. Milagros Alastra

=== Germany ===
The squad was announced on 30 June 2026.

Head coach: (Netherlands) Janneke Schopman

6. Friederike Heusgen
7. Linnea Weidemann (C)
10. Lisa Nolte (C)
11. Lena Micheel
12. Ines Wanner
13. Hanna Rothländer
14. Lucina von der Heyde
15. Nathalie Kubalski (GK)
16. Sonja Zimmermann
17. Lynn Krings
18. Lilly Stoffelsma
19. Finja Starck (GK)
21. Sara Strauss
23. Emma Davidsmeyer
25. Johanna Hachenberg
26. Felicia Wiedermann
27. Stine Kurz
28. Jette Fleschütz
55. Emilia Landshut
77. Yani Zhong

=== Scotland ===
The squad was announced on 7 July 2026.

Head coach: Chris Duncan

1. Jennifer Eadie
4. Eve Pearson
8. Amy Costello
10. Sarah Robertson (C)
11. Katherine Birch
12. Charlotte Watson
13. Ruth Blaikie
15. Heather McEwan
17. Sarah Jamieson
18. Millie Steiger
20. Bronwyn Shields
21. Jessica Martin
22. Emily Overend (GK)
23. Jessica Buchanan (GK)
25. Rebecca Birch
27. Fiona Burnet
30. Katherine Holdgate
31. Zara Kennedy
35. Ellie Mackenzie
37. Ava Findlay

=== United States ===
The squad was announced on 11 July 2026.

Head coach: (Republic of Ireland) David Passmore

1. Abigail Tamer
2. Meredith Sholder (C)
3. Ashley Sessa
4. Sophia Gladieux
8. Madeleine Zimmer
10. Reese D'Ariano
11. Katie Dixon
13. Ashley Hoffman
14. Sanne Caarls
16. Emma DeBerdine
17. Elizabeth Yeager
18. Claire Danahy
20. Leah Crouse
21. Lauren Wadas
26. Lucy Adams
27. Ryleigh Heck
29. Bethany Dykema
31. Kelsey Bing (GK)
32. Jennifer Rizzo (GK)
36. Mia Schoenbeck

== Pool C ==
=== Belgium ===
The squad was announced on 25 July 2026.

Head coach: (Australia) Adam Commens

3. Justine Rasir
4. Delphine Marien
6. Charlotte Englebert (C)
7. Judith Vandermeiren
8. Emma Puvrez
11. Perrine de Clerck
12. Emilie Verhees
13. Alix Gerniers
15. Vanessa Blockmans
17. Michelle Struijk (C)
19. Hélène Brasseur
22. Stéphanie Vanden Borre
23. Elena Sotgiu (GK)
26. Lien Hillewaert
28. Lisa Moors
29. Elodie Picard (GK)
30. Ambre Ballenghien
32. Louise Dewaet
40. Camille Belis
77. Famke van Heel

=== Ireland ===
The squad was announced on 4 August 2026.

Head coach: Gareth Grundie

2. Elizabeth Murphy (GK)
3. Sarah McAuley
5. Michelle Carey
6. Róisín Upton
7. Niamh Carey
8. Sarah Hawkshaw (C)
9. Kathryn Mullan
10. Hannah McLoughlin
11. Sarah Torrans
12. Elena Tice
14. Ellen Curran
15. Caoimhe Perdue
16. Charlotte Beggs
17. Christina Hamill
23. Holly Micklem (GK)
28. Katie Larmour
29. Mikayla Power
30. Emily Kealy
31. Mia Jennings
44. Aisling Utri

=== New Zealand ===
The squad was announced on 6 July 2026.

Head coach: Phillip Burrows

2. Olivia Shannon (C)
3. Ella Hyatt-Brown
8. Hannah Cotter
9. Emelia Surridge
11. Casey Crowley
12. Tessa Reid
13. Josephine Murray
15. Grace O'Hanlon (GK)
16. Elizabeth Thompson
18. Anna Crowley
22. Katie Doar
24. Paige Blake
25. Ruby Baker
26. Kaitlin Cotter
27. Holly Pearson
31. Riana Pho
34. Julia Gluyas (GK)
37. Emma Findlay
38. Brittany Wang
40. Rebecca Baker

=== Spain ===
The squad was announced on 25 July 2026.

Head coach: Carlos García Cuenca

4. Laura Bosch
5. Berta Serrahima
6. Clara Badia
7. Florencia Amundson
8. Lucía Jiménez (C)
10. Patricia Álvarez
11. Marta Segú (C)
13. Constanza Amundson
14. Blanca Pérez
16. Candela Mejías
17. Luciana Molina
18. Berta Agulló
20. Xantal Giné (C)
22. Laia Vidosa
24. Estel Petchamé
26. Clara Pérez (GK)
27. Paula Fernández
28. María Tello (GK)
29. Paula Jiménez
31. Sofía Keenan

== Pool D ==
=== China ===
Head coach: (Australia) Alyson Annan

3. Yang Liu
6. Zhang Ying
7. Chen Yi
9. Ma Ning
10. Zhong Jiaqi
11. Dan Wen
13. Li Hong
16. Ou Zixia (C)
17. Peng Yang
18. Zou Meirong
20. He Jiangxin
23. Fan Yunxia
26. Chen Yang
29. Liu Ping (GK)
35. Tan Jinzhuang
36. Liu Chencheng
50. Li Tong (GK)
53. Chen Tong
58. Yu Anhui
64. Luo Yaxi

=== England ===
The squad was announced on 13 July 2026.

Head coach: (Scotland) David Ralph

2. Darcy Bourne
4. Lily Walker
6. Anna Toman
7. Hannah French
10. Amy Thompson
11. Holly Hunt
13. Elena Rayer
14. Tessa Howard
18. Katharine Curtis
21. Fiona Crackles
22. Elizabeth Neal
23. Sophie Hamilton
25. Sabrina Heesh (GK)
26. Lily Owsley
28. Flora Peel (C)
30. Martha Taylor
31. Grace Balsdon
39. Alice Atkinson
40. Miriam Pritchard (GK)
44. Charlotte Bingham

=== India ===
The squad was announced on 17 July 2026.

Head coach: (Netherlands) Sjoerd Marijne

6. Ishika Chaudhary
8. Nikki Pradhan
9. Bichu Devi Kharibam (GK)
11. Savita Punia (GK)
12. Shilpi Dabas
20. Lalremsiami Hmarzote
21. Deepika Soreng
22. Baljeet Kaur
23. Ishika
24. Jyoti Rumavat
25. Navneet Kaur
27. Sushila Chanu
29. Sunelita Toppo
30. Salima Tete (C)
32. Neha Goyal
35. Rutuja Pisal
37. Lalthantluangi
39. Sakshi Rana
52. Beauty Dungdung
55. Deepika Sehrawat

=== South Africa ===
The squad was announced on 26 July 2026.

Head coach: Inky Zondi

1. Morgan de Jager (GK)
4. Stephanie Botha
5. Edith Molikoe (C)
7. Taheera Augousti
8. Ané Janse van Vuuren
9. Shanna Mendonça
10. Onthatile Zulu
11. Bianca Wood
12. Ntsopa Mokoena
13. Paris-Gail Isaacs
14. Lerato Mahole
16. Baylee Engelke
17. Caylin Maree
18. Hannah Pearce
21. Ongeziwe Mali
23. Jean-Leigh du Toit
25. Nomsa Mzizi
26. Cailynn den Bakker
27. Kayla de Waal
31. Marlise van Tonder (GK)
