= 2023–24 Women's England Hockey League season =

English field hockey season

Women's England Hockey League
- Champions: Surbiton (league} Beeston (cup)

The 2023–24 Women's England Hockey League season (sponsored by Vitality) is the 2023–24 season of England's field hockey league structure and England Hockey Women's Championship Cup for women.

The season started on 16 September 2023. East Grinstead were the defending league champions and Beeston were the defending cup holders, having won the last two season's cup competitions.

Surbiton won the league championship, defeating Hampstead & Westminster 3-1 in the play off final. Beeston won the England Hockey Men's Championship Cup for the third consecutive season.

== Format ==
The Premier Division changed the system of phases and matches, whereby it was possible for a team finishing eighth after phase 2 to still win the title.

- Phase 1 - 11 matches per club determining the top six and bottom six clubs for phase 2.
- Phase 2 - 5 additional matches per club determining the top eight and bottom four clubs for phase 3.
- Phase 3 - 3 additional matches per club determining the top four to progress to league finals weekend and the bottom two to be relegated.

== 2023–2024 teams ==
=== Premier Division ===
Locations of the 2023–24 Premier Division teams

| Team | City/town | Home pitch |
|---|---|---|
| Beeston | Beeston | Nottingham HC |
| Bowdon Hightown | Bowdon | The Bowdon Club |
| Clifton Robinsons | Westbury-on-Trym | Coombe Dingle Sports Centre |
| East Grinstead | East Grinstead | East Grinstead Sports Club |
| Hampstead & Westminster | Paddington | Paddington Recreation Ground |
| Isca & University of Exeter | Exeter | University of Exeter Sports Park |
| Loughborough Students | Loughborough | Loughborough University |
| Reading | Reading | Sonning Lane |
| Surbiton | Long Ditton | Sugden Road |
| University of Birmingham | Birmingham | Bournbrook |
| University of Nottingham | Nottingham | David Ross Sports Village, Nottingham HC |
| Wimbledon W1s | Wimbledon | Raynes Park High School, King's College School |

=== Division One South ===
Locations of the 2023–24 Division One teams; red = South, blue = north
Greater London Division One hockey teams

| Team | City/town | Home pitch |
|---|---|---|
| Barnes W1s | Chiswick | Duke's Meadow, Dan Mason Drive |
| Canterbury W1s | Canterbury | Polo Farm |
| Harleston Magpies W1s | Harleston | Shotford Heath |
| Holcombe W1s | Rochester | Holcombe Park |
| Sevenoaks W1s | Sevenoaks | Vine Cricket Ground |
| Slough W1s | Slough | Upton Park, Upton Road |
| Southgate W1s | Oakwood | Southgate Hockey Centre |
| Surbiton W2s | Long Ditton | Sugden Road |
| Team Bath Buccaneers W1s | Bath | University of Bath |
| Wimbledon W2s | Wimbledon | Raynes Park HS, King's College School |

=== Division One North ===
| Team | City/town | Home pitch |
|---|---|---|
| Ben Rhydding W1s | Ben Rhydding | Coutances Way |
| Buckingham W1s | Buckingham | Stowe School |
| Durham University W1s | Durham | The Graham Sports Centre |
| Gloucester City W1s | Gloucester | Plock Court and St Peter's High School |
| Leicester City W1s | Leicester | Leicester Grammar School |
| Olton & West Warwicks W1s | Solihull | West Warwickshire Sports Complex |
| Stourport W1s | Stourport-on-Severn | Stourport Sports Club |
| Sutton Coldfield W1s | Sutton Coldfield | Rectory Park |
| Swansea W1s | Swansea | Swansea University's International Sports Village |
| Wakefield W1s | Wakefield | College Grove Sports Ground |

== Final tables ==
=== Premier Division ===
| Pos | Team | P | W | D | L | Pts | Section |
|---|---|---|---|---|---|---|---|
| 1 | Surbiton | 16 | 13 | 0 | 3 | 39 | top 6-top 8 |
| 2 | East Grinstead | 16 | 11 | 1 | 4 | 34 | top 6-top 8 |
| 3 | Reading | 16 | 11 | 1 | 4 | 34 | top 6-top 8 |
| 4 | Hampstead & Westminster | 16 | 8 | 3 | 5 | 27 | top 6-top 8 |
| 5 | University of Nottingham | 16 | 5 | 4 | 7 | 19 | top 6-top 8 |
| 6 | Bowdon | 16 | 3 | 6 | 7 | 15 | top 6-top 8 |
| 7 | Wimbledon | 16 | 7 | 6 | 3 | 27 | bottom 6-top 8 |
| 8 | Clifton Robinsons | 16 | 6 | 4 | 6 | 22 | bottom 6-top 8 |
| 9 | Loughborough Students | 18 | 6 | 4 | 8 | 22 | bottom 6 - bottom 4 |
| 10 | University of Birmingham | 18 | 4 | 8 | 6 | 20 | bottom 6 - bottom 4 |
| 11 | Beeston | 18 | 5 | 2 | 11 | 17 | bottom 6 - bottom 4 |
| 12 | Isca & University of Exeter | 18 | 1 | 1 | 16 | 4 | bottom 6 - bottom 4 |

==== Top 8 - Phase 3 ====
Pool A
| Pos | Team | Pts |
|---|---|---|
| 1 | Surbiton | 9 |
| 2 | Hampstead & W | 6 |
| 3 | Univ of Nott | 3 |
| 4 | Clifton Robinsons | 0 |

Pool B
| Pos | Team | Pts |
|---|---|---|
| 1 | East Grinstead | 8 |
| 2 | Wimbledon | 6 |
| 3 | Reading | 3 |
| 4 | Bowdon | 1 |

==== Finals weekend ====
Semi-finals
13 April – Surbiton HC, Long Ditton
East Grinstead | 2 (2)
Hampstead & Westminster (pen.) | 2 (3)
13 April – Surbiton HC, Long Ditton
Surbiton | 2
Wimbledon | 0

Final
14 April – Surbiton HC, Long Ditton
Hampstead & Westminster | 1
Surbiton | 3
Third place
14 April – Surbiton HC, Long Ditton
East Grinstead (pen.) | 1 (4)
Wimbledon | 1 (3)

Semi-finals

13 April 2024
11:00

| East Grinstead | 2–2 | Hampstead & Westminster |
|---|---|---|
| Faulstich 11'; Bray 15' | Report | Hunt 45'; Leigh 60' |
Penalties
| Bray (penalty shoot-out scored); Malzer (penalty shoot-out scored); Breed (penalty shoot-out missed); Fernández (penalty shoot-out missed); Brown (penalty shoot-out missed) | 2–3 | (penalty shoot-out scored) Brown; (penalty shoot-out missed) Leigh; (penalty shoot-out missed) Hunt; (penalty shoot-out scored) Ratcliffe; (penalty shoot-out scored) Martin |

Surbiton Hockey Club, Long Ditton
Umpires:
Rebecca Edwards (ENG)
Clare White (ENG)

13 April 2024
13:15

| Surbiton | 2–0 | Wimbledon |
|---|---|---|
| Taylor 8'; Sharp 21' | Report |

Surbiton Hockey Club, Long Ditton
Umpires:
Clare Barwood (WAL)
Zoe Hall (ENG)

Third and fourth place

14 April 2024
10:00

| East Grinstead | 1–1 | Wimbledon |
|---|---|---|
| Walker 36' | Report | Crowson 51' |
Penalties
| Walker (penalty shoot-out scored); Malzer (penalty shoot-out missed); Breed (penalty shoot-out scored); Bray (penalty shoot-out scored); Rayer (penalty shoot-out scored) | 4–3 | (penalty shoot-out missed) Crowson; (penalty shoot-out scored) Crackles; (penalty shoot-out scored) Toman; (penalty shoot-out missed) Eadie; (penalty shoot-out scored) Manton |

Surbiton Hockey Club, Long Ditton
Umpires:
Clare White (ENG)
Zoe Hall (ENG)

Final

14 April 2024
14:30

| Hampstead & Westminster | 1–3 | Surbiton |
|---|---|---|
| Ratcliffe 20' | Report | Wilkinson 39'; Sharp 49'; Hamilton 58' |

Surbiton Hockey Club, Long Ditton
Umpires:
Rebecca Edwards (ENG)
Clare Barwood (WAL)

==== Finals Squads ====
East Grinstead
1. Isabelle Field (GK)
4. Sally Sime
5. Alexandra Malzer
6. Amy Thompson
7. Guadalupe Fernández (C)
9. Courtney Hansford
10. Laura Roper
12. Lily Walker
13. Elena Rayer
14. Tessa Howard
15. Olivia Breed
16. Anna Faulstich
17. Chloe Brown
18. Mollie Mason
19. Sophie Bray
20. Summer Knight-Thompson
21. Charlotte Watkins
22. Pippa Lock
23. Biba Mills
25. Anna Moore
27. Katie Cardwell (GK)
31. Grace Balsdon
Hampstead & Westminster
1. Miriam Pritchard (GK)
2. Isabella Davison
5. Olivia Hamilton
6. Anna O'Flanagan
7. Amy Elliott
8. Phoebe Willars
10. Katherine Baker (C)
11. Sarah Robertson
12. Lily Owsley
13. Siofra Murdoch
14. Sofia Martin
16. Phillipa Lewis
17. Madeleine Ratcliffe
18. Hannah Davey
19. Emily Rowlands
20. Melanie Wilkinson
21. Rachel Greenwood
22. Joie Leigh
24. Holly Hunt
28. Victoria Drews
29. Esme Burge
30. Lauren Hunt
31. Iona Campbell (GK)
Surbiton
1. Jemma Woods (GK)
2. Giselle Ansley
4. Charlotte Ross
7. Sarah Evans
9. Meg Dowthwaite
10. Hannah Martin
11. Holly Payne
12. Sophie Hamilton
13. Eloise Stenner
14. Stephanie Elliott (C)
15. Martha Taylor
17. Leah Wilkinson
18. Isabelle Petter
19. Katie Curtis
20. Amy Costello
23. Alice Sharp
25. Lilie Lamacraft
27. Elani Sherwood
29. Isabelle Yonge
30. Amber Walton (GK)
31. Josefina Hippe
32. Sarah Johnston
33. Delphine Ayitey-Hammond (GK)
33. Laura Myers (GK)
Wimbledon
1. Nicola Cochrane (GK)
2. Maia Hendrickx (GK)
3. Ella Robinson
4. Tula Knowles
5. Jennifer Eadie
6. Anna Toman (C)
7. Harriet Naismith
8. Olivia Chilton
10. Rebecca Manton
11. Suzanna Petty
12. Lucy Holder
14. Megan Crowson
15. Elizabeth Bingham
17. Lydia Macdonell
18. Charlotte Lee
21. Fiona Crackles
22. Anna Reynolds
24. Amelie Rees
25. Nicole Bowen
26. Emily Gilbert
28. Flora Peel
30. Paige Gillott

=== Division One North ===
| Pos | Team | P | W | L | D | Pts |
|---|---|---|---|---|---|---|
| 1 | Sutton Coldfield W1s | 18 | 14 | 2 | 2 | 44 |
| 2 | Durham University W1s | 18 | 11 | 5 | 2 | 38 |
| 3 | Buckingham W1s | 18 | 10 | 5 | 3 | 35 |
| 4 | Ben Rhydding W1s | 18 | 9 | 4 | 5 | 31 |
| 5 | Leicester City W1s | 18 | 8 | 3 | 7 | 27 |
| 6 | Gloucester City W1s | 18 | 7 | 4 | 7 | 25 |
| 7 | Olton & West Warwicks W1s | 18 | 3 | 6 | 9 | 15 |
| 8 | Wakefield W1s | 18 | 4 | 2 | 12 | 14 |
| 9 | Stourport W1s | 18 | 3 | 3 | 12 | 12 |
| 10 | Swansea W1s | 18 | 1 | 6 | 11 | 9 |

=== Division One South ===
| Pos | Team | P | W | L | D | Pts |
|---|---|---|---|---|---|---|
| 1 | Surbiton W2s | 18 | 14 | 1 | 3 | 43 |
| 2 | Holcombe W1s | 18 | 12 | 3 | 3 | 39 |
| 3 | Barnes W1s | 18 | 12 | 1 | 5 | 37 |
| 4 | Sevenoaks W1s | 18 | 9 | 2 | 7 | 29 |
| 5 | Harleston Magpies W1s | 18 | 7 | 3 | 8 | 24 |
| 6 | Slough W1s | 18 | 5 | 6 | 7 | 21 |
| 7 | Southgate W1s | 18 | 6 | 2 | 10 | 20 |
| 8 | Wimbledon W2s | 18 | 5 | 1 | 12 | 16 |
| 9 | Canterbury W1s | 18 | 4 | 4 | 10 | 16 |
| 10 | Team Bath Buccaneers W1s | 18 | 3 | 3 | 12 | 12 |

=== Conference East ===
| Pos | Team | P | W | D | L | Pts |
|---|---|---|---|---|---|---|
| 1 | Guildford W1s | 18 | 14 | 2 | 2 | 44 |
| 2 | London Wayfarers W1s | 18 | 11 | 4 | 3 | 37 |
| 3 | Hampstead & Westminster W2s | 18 | 10 | 5 | 3 | 33 |
| 4 | Old Loughtonians W1s | 18 | 8 | 7 | 3 | 31 |
| 5 | Old Georgians W1s | 18 | 8 | 3 | 7 | 27 |
| 6 | Teddington W1s | 18 | 8 | 2 | 8 | 26 |
| 7 | Spencer W1s | 18 | 7 | 2 | 9 | 23 |
| 8 | East London W1s | 18 | 4 | 3 | 11 | 15 |
| 9 | Horsham W1s (R) | 18 | 2 | 2 | 14 | 8 |
| 10 | Ipswich W1s (R) | 18 | 2 | 2 | 14 | 8 |

=== Conference Midlands ===
| Pos | Team | P | W | D | L | Pts |
|---|---|---|---|---|---|---|
| 1 | Repton W1s | 18 | 13 | 3 | 2 | 42 |
| 2 | St Albans W1s | 18 | 12 | 3 | 3 | 39 |
| 3 | Cambridge City W1s | 18 | 12 | 2 | 4 | 38 |
| 4 | Beeston W2s | 18 | 7 | 7 | 4 | 28 |
| 5 | Cannock W1s | 18 | 8 | 3 | 7 | 27 |
| 6 | University of Birmingham W2s | 18 | 5 | 5 | 8 | 20 |
| 7 | Doncaster W1s | 18 | 5 | 4 | 9 | 19 |
| 8 | Bedford W1s | 18 | 4 | 5 | 9 | 17 |
| 9 | Oxford University W1s (R) | 18 | 3 | 3 | 12 | 12 |
| 10 | Belper W1s (R) | 18 | 2 | 3 | 13 | 9 |

=== Conference North ===
| Pos | Team | P | W | D | L | Pts |
|---|---|---|---|---|---|---|
| 1 | Pendle Forest W1s | 18 | 13 | 3 | 2 | 42 |
| 2 | Leeds W1s | 18 | 8 | 7 | 3 | 31 |
| 3 | Durham University W2s | 18 | 8 | 3 | 7 | 27 |
| 4 | Fylde W1s | 18 | 8 | 3 | 7 | 27 |
| 5 | Newcastle University W1s | 18 | 6 | 7 | 5 | 25 |
| 6 | Didsbury Northern W1s | 18 | 6 | 6 | 6 | 24 |
| 7 | Bowdon W2s | 18 | 4 | 7 | 7 | 19 |
| 8 | Harrogate W1s | 18 | 4 | 7 | 7 | 19 |
| 9 | Timperley W1s (R) | 18 | 4 | 6 | 8 | 18 |
| 10 | Brooklands-Poynton W1s (R) | 18 | 2 | 5 | 11 | 11 |

=== Conference West ===
| Pos | Team | P | W | D | L | Pts |
|---|---|---|---|---|---|---|
| 1 | Bristol Firebrands W1s | 18 | 12 | 5 | 1 | 41 |
| 2 | Clifton Robinsons W2s | 18 | 11 | 4 | 3 | 37 |
| 3 | Exeter W1s | 18 | 10 | 2 | 6 | 32 |
| 4 | Reading W2s | 18 | 9 | 2 | 7 | 29 |
| 5 | Witney W1s | 18 | 8 | 4 | 6 | 28 |
| 6 | Trojans W1s | 18 | 8 | 2 | 8 | 26 |
| 7 | Oxford Hawks W1s | 18 | 6 | 4 | 8 | 22 |
| 8 | Cheltenham W1s | 18 | 6 | 4 | 8 | 22 |
| 9 | Fareham W1s (R) | 18 | 0 | 8 | 10 | 8 |
| 10 | Basingstoke W1s (R) | 18 | 2 | 1 | 15 | 7 |

== England Hockey Women's Championship Cup ==
=== Semi-finals ===
| Date | Team 1 | Team 2 | Score |
|---|---|---|---|
| 7 Apr | Doncaster | Holcombe | 0–4 |
| 7 Apr | Surbiton 2nd XI | Beeston | 2–7 |

=== Final ===
- Lee Valley Hockey and Tennis Centre

| Date | Team 1 | Team 2 | Score |
|---|---|---|---|
| 6 May | Beeston | Holcombe | 2–1 |

Beeston
Steph Tirrell (gk), Nicola Moss, Ella Cusack, Cerys Miller, Jane Kilpatrick, Lauren Burrell (c), Hannah Grieve, Beatrice Bell, Lottie Summers (fg 59th minute), Lucy Millington (pc 39th minute), Lauren Dunn, Rosy Stephens, Katie Mason, Julia Spence, Amelie Clarkson, Jessica Mauro

Holcombe
Tilly Woodhead (gk), Robyn Hodges, Lottie Bingham, Tilly Tillings, Emma Bandurak, Deanna Ritchie, Lucy Whalley, Leisa Randall, Harriet Pittard (c), Bethan Hodges, Hattie Jones (pc 66th minute), Catherine Ledesma, Charlotte Daly, Hannah Bond, Hannah Carney, Marian Ledesma

== See also ==
2023–24 Men's England Hockey League season
