= 2026 Women's FIH Hockey World Cup =

Field hockey championship edition

Coupe du monde féminine de hockey sur gazon 2026 Wereldkampioenschap hockey voor vrouwen 2026
- Together for glory

Tournament details
- Host countries: Belgium; Netherlands
- Cities: Wavre; Amstelveen
- Dates: 15–29 August
- Teams: 16 (from 5 confederations)
- Venue(s): Belfius Hockey Arena; Wagener Stadium

Final positions
- Champions: Argentina (3rd title)
- Runner-up: Netherlands
- Third place: Belgium

Tournament statistics
- Matches played: 50
- Goals scored: 177 (3.54 per match)
- Top scorer: (Netherlands) Yibbi Jansen (8 goals)
- Best player: (Belgium) Charlotte Englebert
- Best young player: (Argentina) Zoe Díaz
- Best goalkeeper: (Australia) Jocelyn Bartram

The 2026 Women's FIH Hockey World Cup was the 16th edition of the Women's FIH Hockey World Cup, the quadrennial world championship for women's national field hockey teams organized by the International Hockey Federation. It was held from 15 to 29 August 2026 in Wavre, Belgium and Amsterdam, Netherlands.

Belgium and Netherlands were given the hosting rights in November 2022, beating bids from Australia, South Africa and Uruguay in the process. This was the second time the women's event was co-hosted after 2022. This also marked Belgium's first and Netherlands' fifth time hosting. This was also the first time the men's and women's world cup were held as one joint tournament.

16 teams participated for the third time after the expansion in 2018. Qualification was an amalgamation of the FIH Pro League, continental championships and the World Cup Qualifiers. Qualification took place from December 2023 to March 2026 to decide the qualifiers.

Netherlands were the defending champions after defeating the Argentina 3–1 at the 2022 final in Terrassa. Argentina returned the favour and won after penalties against the Netherlands to win their third title. Belgium beat Australia 1–0 to win their second bronze medal, the first since the 1978 World Cup.

South Africa-India at the 2026 Women’s FIH Hockey World Cup, played at Wagener Stadium, Amstelveen, the Netherlands, on August 18th 2026.

== Host selection ==
The International Hockey Federation announced on 15 June 2022 that they had received the following three bids for holding only women's 2026 World Cup:

- Australia
- South Africa
- Uruguay

The following two bids were received for holding combined women's and men's world cup simultaneously:

- Belgium and Netherlands
- South Africa

Wavre, Belgium and Amstelveen, Netherlands were awarded the hosting rights on 3 November 2022. This was the Netherlands' fifth time hosting after 1986, 1998, 2014, and 2022. This was Belgium's first time hosting.

== Teams ==
=== Qualification ===
Highlighted are the countries that are participating in the 2026 Women's FIH Hockey World Cup. Qualified Hosts

Just as in 2018 and 2023, 16 teams competed in the tournament. Alongside hosts, Belgium and Netherlands, the top-ranked team in the 2023–24 and 2024–25 seasons in the FIH Pro League and the five continental champions receive an automatic berth. The other 16 teams will compete for the last seven places in the World Cup Qualifiers. Of the qualified teams, 14 took part in the previous edition.

Returnees

- Scotland returns after last taking part in 2002.
- United States qualified after missing out in 2022.

Absentees

- South Korea failed to qualify for the first time since 1986, having made the previous nine editions.
- Canada didn't advance after making their first appearance since 1994 in 2022.

The highest ranked team to not qualify was France, ranked 16th, while the lowest ranked team to qualify was South Africa, ranked 18th.

Dates	Event	Location	Quotas	Qualifier(s)
3 November 2022	Hosts	—N/a	2	Belgium; Netherlands
6 December 2023 – 29 June 2024	2023–24 FIH Pro League	—N/a	1	Germany
30 November 2024 – 29 June 2025	2024–25 FIH Pro League	—N/a	1	Argentina
24 July – 3 August 2025	2025 Pan American Cup	(Uruguay) Montevideo	1	United States
9–17 August 2025	2025 EuroHockey Championship	(Germany) Mönchengladbach	1	Spain
4–7 September 2025	2025 Oceania Cup	(Australia) Darwin	1	New Zealand
5–14 September 2025	2025 Asia Cup	(China) Hangzhou	1	China
11–18 October 2025	2025 Africa Cup of Nations	(Egypt) Ismailia	1	South Africa
2–8 March 2026	2026 World Cup Qualifiers	(Chile) Santiago	4	Australia; Chile; Ireland; Japan
8–14 March 2026	2026 World Cup Qualifiers	(India) Hyderabad	3	England; India; Scotland
Total			16	

=== Summary of qualified teams ===
Team	Qualification method	Date of qualification	Appearance(s)				Previous best performance (Note: Bold text indicates they hosted that edition.)	WR (Note: World ranking at start of tournament)
Team	Qualification method	Date of qualification	Total	First	Last	Streak	Previous best performance	WR
Belgium	Co-hosts	3 November 2022	8th	1974	2022	4	Third place (1978)	3
Netherlands	Co-hosts	3 November 2022	16th	1974	2022	16	Champions (Nine times) (Note: Netherlands have won in 1974, 1978, 1983, 1986, 1990, 2006, 2014, 2018 and 2022.)	1
Germany	2023–24 FIH Pro League	27 June 2024	16th	1974	2022	16	Champions (1976, 1981)	5
Argentina	2024–25 FIH Pro League	22 June 2025	16th	1974	2022	16	Champions (2002, 2010)	2
United States	2025 Pan American Cup	1 August 2025	10th	1983	2018	1	Third place (1994)	11
Spain	2025 EuroHockey Championship	13 August 2025	13th	1974	2022	3	Third place (2018)	6
New Zealand	2025 Oceania Cup	7 September 2025	10th	1983	2022	5	Fourth place (1986)	10
China	2025 Asia Cup	14 September 2025	10th	1990	2022	10	Third place (2002)	4
South Africa	2025 Africa Cup of Nations	18 October 2025	8th	1998	2022	8	Seventh place (1998)	18
Australia	2026 World Cup Qualifiers	7 March 2026	13th	1981	2022	13	Champions (1994, 1998)	8
Chile	2026 World Cup Qualifiers	7 March 2026	2nd	2022		2	Thirteenth place (2022)	13
Ireland	2026 World Cup Qualifiers	8 March 2026	6th	1986	2022	3	Runners-up (2018)	12
England	2026 World Cup Qualifiers	13 March 2026	12th	1983	2022	12	Third place (2010)	7
India	2026 World Cup Qualifiers	13 March 2026	9th	1974	2022	3	Fourth place (1974)	9
Japan	2026 World Cup Qualifiers	13 March 2026	10th	1978	2022	4	Fifth place (2006)	15
Scotland	2026 World Cup Qualifiers	14 March 2026	5th	1983	2002	1	Eighth place (1983)	14

== Venues ==
The Belfius Hockey Arena in Wavre was renovated during the preparations for the tournament. The venue was completed in early 2026 and has a 4,000 capacity that was expanded to 10,000 for the tournament. The Wagener Stadium in Amstelveen is 8,000 but was also expanded to 10,000 for the event.

(Netherlands) Amstelveen	2026 Women's FIH Hockey World Cup is located in Benelux	(Belgium) Wavre
Wagener Stadium	2026 Women's FIH Hockey World Cup is located in Benelux	Belfius Hockey Arena
Capacity: 10,000	2026 Women's FIH Hockey World Cup is located in Benelux	Capacity: 10,000

== Draw ==
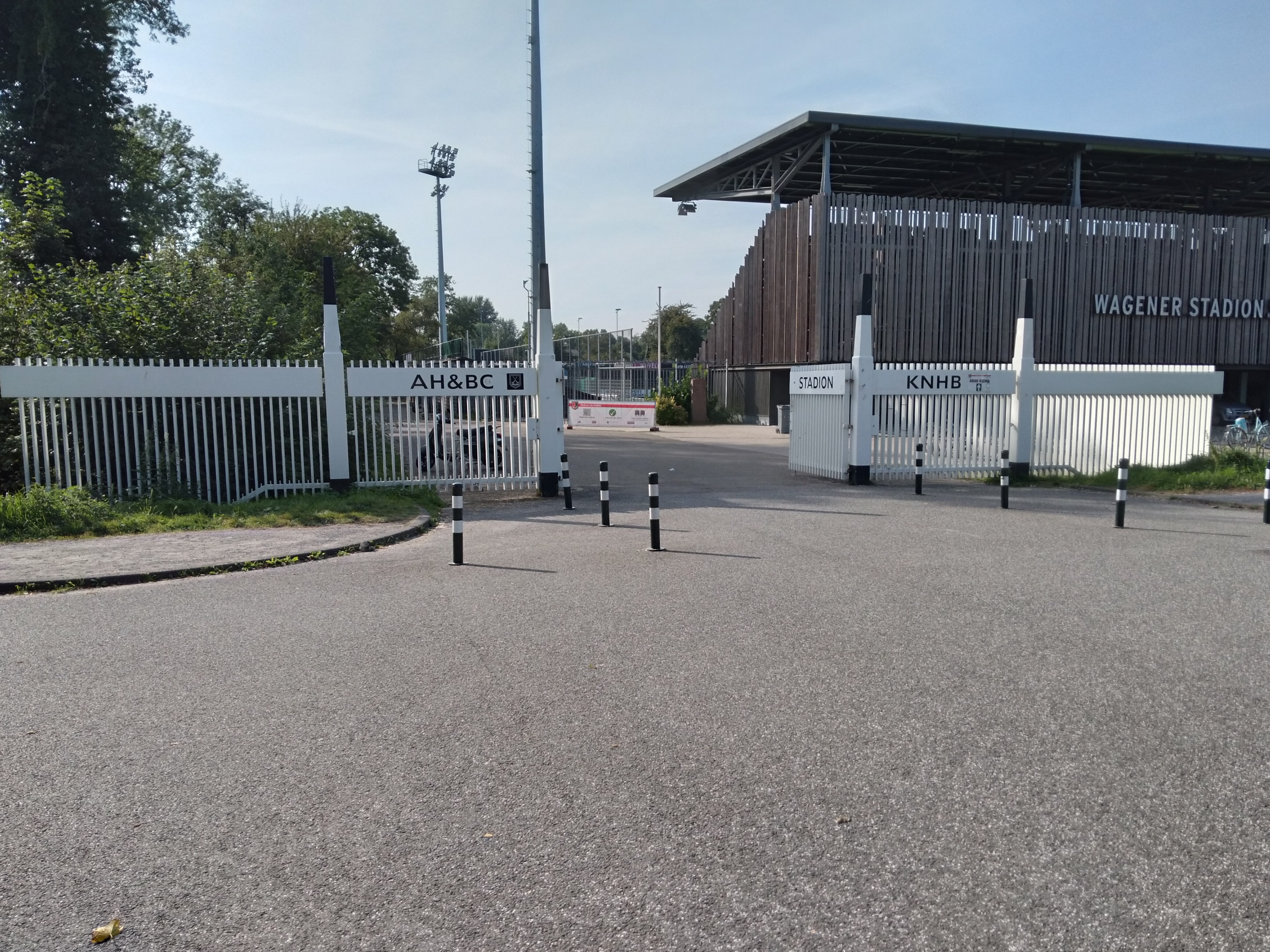
The Wagener Stadium in Amstelveen hosted the draw.

The final draw took place at 15:00 CET on 17 March 2026 at the Wagener Stadium in Amstelveen, Netherlands. Model and presenter, Joyce Colfs, hosted the draw. Field Hockey players, Naomi van As, Barbara Nelen and Teun de Nooijer, alongside Dutch rapper La Fuente, were the guests who assisted the draw. The draw started with the co-hosts being placed into their respective groups held in their country, as well as the two remaining pot 1 teams, Argentina and China, being pre-drawn into groups B and D respectively. The draw continued with, in order, pots 4, 3 and 2 being drawn, with each team selected then allocated into the first available group alphabetically. The position for the team within the group would then be drawn (for the purpose of the schedule). There were no restrictions.

- 2026 Women's FIH Hockey World Cup – Draw
- Draw Live Stream (log in required)

=== Seeding ===
Pot 1
Team
Netherlands (H)
Argentina
Belgium (H)
China

Pot 2
Team
Spain
England
Germany
Australia

Pot 3
Team
India
New Zealand
Chile
United States

Pot 4
Team
Ireland
Scotland
Japan
South Africa

=== Draw results ===
Group A in the Netherlands
Pos	Team
A1	Netherlands (H)
A2	Australia
A3	Chile
A4	Japan

Group B in Belgium
Pos	Team
B1	Argentina
B2	Germany
B3	United States
B4	Scotland

Group C in Belgium
Pos	Team
C1	Belgium (H)
C2	Spain
C3	New Zealand
C4	Ireland

Group D in the Netherlands
Pos	Team
D1	China
D2	England
D3	India
D4	South Africa

=== Schedule ===
Schedule
Round	Gameday	Date
Preliminary round	Gameday 1	15–16 August 2026
Preliminary round	Gameday 2	17–18 August 2026
Preliminary round	Gameday 3	19–20 August 2026
Second round Classification round
Second round Classification round	Gameday 4	21–22 August 2026
Second round Classification round	Gameday 5	23–24 August 2026
Knockout stage
Knockout stage	Semi-finals; Placement games	27 August 2026
Knockout stage	Final	29 August 2026

== Umpires ==
On 20 January 2026, 16 umpires were appointed by the FIH for this tournament.

- Irene Presenqui (ARG)
- Aleisha Neumann (AUS)
- Kristy Robertson (AUS)
- Laurine Delforge (BEL)
- Magali Sergeant (BEL)
- Liu Xiaoying (CHN)
- Hannah Harrison (ENG)
- Rachel Williams (ENG)
- Alison Keogh (IRL)
- Amber Church (NZL)
- Victoria Pazos (PAR)
- Sarah Wilson (SCO)
- Annelize Rostron (RSA)
- Wanri Venter (RSA)
- Kim Yoon-seon (KOR)
- Ayanna McClean (TTO)

== First round ==
The hosts schedule was published on 30 September 2025. The match schedule was revealed on 18 March 2026.

All times are local (UTC+2).

=== Pool A ===
Pos	Team	Pld	W	D	L	GF	GA	GD	Pts	Qualification
1	Netherlands (H)	3	3	0	0	15	2	+13	9	Second round
2	Australia	3	1	1	1	8	8	0	4	Second round
3	Japan	3	1	0	2	3	11	−8	3	9th–16th classification
4	Chile	3	0	1	2	4	9	−5	1	9th–16th classification

Source: FIH
Rules for classification: 1) points; 2) matches won; 3) goal difference; 4) goals for; 5) head-to-head result; 6) field goals scored.
(H) Hosts

15 August 2026
10:00

Australia	2–0	Japan
Colwill 27', 51'	Report

Wagener Stadium, Amstelveen
Umpires:
Irene Presenqui (ARG)
Kim Yoon-seon (KOR)

15 August 2026
16:00

Netherlands	2–0	Chile
Veen 23'; Y. Jansen 35'	Report

Wagener Stadium, Amstelveen
Umpires:
Magali Sergeant (BEL)
Amber Church (NZL)

17 August 2026
09:30

Chile	0–3	Japan
	Report	Hasegawa 8'; Murayama 17'; Ueno 22'

Wagener Stadium, Amstelveen
Umpires:
Alison Keogh (IRL)
Ayanna McClean (TTO)

17 August 2026
18:00

Australia	2–4	Netherlands
Kershaw 23'; Wilson 49'	Report	Y. Jansen 13'; Burg 22', 52'; Veen 56'

Wagener Stadium, Amstelveen
Umpires:
Laurine Delforge (BEL)
Annelize Rostron (RSA)

19 August 2026
09:00

Chile	4–4	Australia
Müller 34'; Urroz 47'; Barrios 53'; Villagrán 55'	Report	Schonell 30'; Wilson 41'; Colwill 52'; Williams 60'

Wagener Stadium, Amstelveen
Umpires:
Amber Church (NZL)
Kim Yoon-seon (KOR)

19 August 2026
18:00

Netherlands	9–0	Japan
Y. Jansen 5', 23', 25', 51'; Veen 15', 34'; Albers 21', 53'; Matla 46'	Report

Wagener Stadium, Amstelveen
Umpires:
Irene Presenqui (ARG)
Magali Sergeant (BEL)

=== Pool B ===
Pos	Team	Pld	W	D	L	GF	GA	GD	Pts	Qualification
1	Argentina	3	2	1	0	6	3	+3	7	Second round
2	Germany	3	2	0	1	8	4	+4	6	Second round
3	United States	3	1	1	1	5	6	−1	4	9th–16th classification
4	Scotland	3	0	0	3	2	8	−6	0	9th–16th classification

Source: FIH
Rules for classification: 1) points; 2) matches won; 3) goal difference; 4) goals for; 5) head-to-head result; 6) field goals scored.

15 August 2026
11:30

Germany	3–0	Scotland
Zhong 19'; Hachenberg 24'; Krings 59'	Report

Belfius Hockey Arena, Wavre
Umpires:
Kristy Robertson (AUS)
Wanri Venter (RSA)

15 August 2026
17:30

Argentina	1–1	United States
Bruggesser 11'	Report	DeBerdine 27'

Belfius Hockey Arena, Wavre
Umpires:
Sarah Wilson (SCO)
Liu Xiaoying (CHN)

17 August 2026
11:00

United States	3–2	Scotland
D'Ariano 4'; Gladieux 24'; Schoenbeck 39'	Report	Robertson 10'; Steiger 40'

Belfius Hockey Arena, Wavre
Umpires:
Hannah Harrison (ENG)
Victoria Pazos (PAR)

17 August 2026
17:00

Germany	2–3	Argentina
Nolte 51'; Zimmermann 53'	Report	Trinchinetti 3'; Gorzelany 48', 56'

Belfius Hockey Arena, Wavre
Umpires:
Aleisha Neumann (AUS)
Rachel Williams (ENG)

19 August 2026
11:00

Argentina	2–0	Scotland
M. Granatto 11'; Casas 41'	Report

Belfius Hockey Arena, Wavre
Umpires:
Victoria Pazos (PAR)
Kristy Robertson (AUS)

19 August 2026
14:00

United States	1–3	Germany
Sessa 39'	Report	Fleschütz 21', 43'; Nolte 33'

Belfius Hockey Arena, Wavre
Umpires:
Hannah Harrison (ENG)
Sarah Wilson (SCO)

=== Pool C ===
Pos	Team	Pld	W	D	L	GF	GA	GD	Pts	Qualification
1	Belgium (H)	3	2	1	0	8	4	+4	7	Second round
2	Spain	3	2	1	0	7	3	+4	7	Second round
3	Ireland	3	1	0	2	6	7	−1	3	9th–16th classification
4	New Zealand	3	0	0	3	4	11	−7	0	9th–16th classification

Source: FIH
Rules for classification: 1) points; 2) matches won; 3) goal difference; 4) goals for; 5) head-to-head result; 6) field goals scored.
(H) Hosts

16 August 2026
17:30

Belgium	5–2	New Zealand
Vanden Borre 9'; Puvrez 12'; Englebert 22'; Rasir 41', 47'	Report	Doar 4'; H. Cotter 33'

Belfius Hockey Arena, Wavre
Umpires:
Victoria Pazos (PAR)
Coen van Bunge (NED)

16 August 2026
20:30

Spain	3–2	Ireland
Vidosa 24'; Keenan 39'; Giné 56'	Report	McLoughlin 37'; N. Carey 42'

Belfius Hockey Arena, Wavre
Umpires:
Hannah Harrison (ENG)
Aleisha Neumann (AUS)

18 August 2026
11:00

New Zealand	2–3	Ireland
Surridge 35'; Doar 60'	Report	Hawkshaw 24'; Upton 49'; Mullan 57'

Belfius Hockey Arena, Wavre
Umpires:
Liu Xiaoying (CHN)
Kristy Robertson (AUS)

18 August 2026
20:30

Spain	1–1	Belgium
L. Jiménez 42'	Report	Vanden Borre 24'

Belfius Hockey Arena, Wavre
Umpires:
David Tomlinson (NZL)
Wanri Venter (RSA)

20 August 2026
14:00

New Zealand	0–3	Spain
	Report	Álvarez 40', 55', 60'

Belfius Hockey Arena, Wavre
Umpires:
Aleisha Neumann (AUS)
Wanri Venter (RSA)

20 August 2026
20:30

Belgium	2–1	Ireland
Englebert 49'; Ballenghien 60'	Report	Beggs 13'

Belfius Hockey Arena, Wavre

=== Pool D ===
Pos	Team	Pld	W	D	L	GF	GA	GD	Pts	Qualification
1	China	3	2	1	0	11	5	+6	7	Second round
2	India	3	1	2	0	8	3	+5	5	Second round
3	England	3	1	1	1	6	4	+2	4	9th–16th classification
4	South Africa	3	0	0	3	2	15	−13	0	9th–16th classification

Source: FIH
Rules for classification: 1) points; 2) matches won; 3) goal difference; 4) goals for; 5) head-to-head result; 6) field goals scored.

16 August 2026
10:00

England	4–0	South Africa
Bourne 10'; Howard 13'; Neal 30'; Hamilton 41'	Report

Wagener Stadium, Amstelveen
Umpires:
Rawi Anbananthan (MAS)
Ayanna McClean (TTO)

16 August 2026
13:00

China	2–2	India
Zhang 15'; Ma 39'	Report	Navneet 8'; Deepika 25'

Wagener Stadium, Amstelveen
Umpires:
Alison Keogh (IRL)
Annelize Rostron (RSA)

18 August 2026
12:30

England	2–4	China
Howard 54'; Hamilton 57'	Report	Zou 18', 35'; Chen Ya. 22'; Liu 23'

Wagener Stadium, Amstelveen
Umpires:
Amber Church (NZL)
Darren Hubach (RSA)

18 August 2026
15:00

India	6–1	South Africa
Sunelita 11'; Navneet 17'; Sushila 25'; Deepika 38'; Lalremsiami 44'; Sakshi 45'	Report	De Waal 55'

Wagener Stadium, Amstelveen
Umpires:
Magali Sergeant (BEL)
Irene Presenqui (ARG)

20 August 2026
09:30

China	5–1	South Africa
Zou 4', 58'; Zhong 25'; Yu 30'; Chen Yi 46'	Report	Isaacs 25'

Wagener Stadium, Amstelveen
Umpires:
Kim Yoon Seon (KOR)
Ayanna McClean (TTO)

20 August 2026
15:00

India	0–0	England
	Report

Wagener Stadium, Amstelveen
Umpires:
Irene Presenqui (ARG)
Annelize Rostron (RSA)

== Second round ==
=== Pool E ===
Pos	Team	Pld	W	D	L	GF	GA	GD	Pts	Qualification
1	Netherlands (H)	3	3	0	0	10	3	+7	9	Semifinals
2	Australia	3	0	2	1	3	5	−2	2	Semifinals
3	India	3	0	2	1	2	4	−2	2	Fifth place game
4	China	3	0	2	1	4	7	−3	2	Seventh place game

Source: FIH
Rules for classification: 1) points; 2) matches won; 3) goal difference; 4) goals for; 5) head-to-head result; 6) field goals scored.
(H) Hosts

21 August 2026
15:00

China	1–1	Australia
Zhang 39'	Report	Wilson 48'

Wagener Stadium, Amstelveen
Umpires:
Amber Church (NZL)
Irene Presenqui (ARG)

21 August 2026
18:00

Netherlands	2–0	India
Y. Jansen 2'; Matla 38'	Report

Wagener Stadium, Amstelveen
Umpires:
Laurine Delforge (BEL)
Alison Keogh (IRL)

23 August 2026
16:00

Netherlands	4–1	China
F. Moes 10'; Albers 11'; Burg 22'; Veen 28'	Report	Zhang 24'

Wagener Stadium, Amstelveen
Attendance: 10,286
Umpires:
Alison Keogh (IRL)
Annelize Rostron (RSA)

23 August 2026
19:00

Australia	0–0	India
	Report

Wagener Stadium, Amstelveen
Umpires:
Laurine Delforge (BEL)
Magali Sergeant (BEL)

=== Pool F ===
Pos	Team	Pld	W	D	L	GF	GA	GD	Pts	Qualification
1	Argentina	3	2	1	0	6	2	+4	7	Semifinals
2	Belgium (H)	3	1	2	0	4	2	+2	5	Semifinals
3	Germany	3	1	0	2	7	7	0	3	Fifth place game
4	Spain	3	0	1	2	2	8	−6	1	Seventh place game

Source: FIH
Rules for classification: 1) points; 2) matches won; 3) goal difference; 4) goals for; 5) head-to-head result; 6) field goals scored.
(H) Hosts

22 August 2026
17:30

Germany	1–3	Belgium
Nolte 32'	Report	Marien 23'; Vanden Borre 34'; Englebert 42'

Belfius Hockey Arena, Wavre
Umpires:
Victoria Pazos (PAR)
Sarah Wilson (SCO)

22 August 2026
21:00

Argentina	3–0	Spain
Gorzelany 1', 14'; Castellaro 3'	Report

Belfius Hockey Arena, Wavre
Umpires:
Aleisha Neumann (AUS)
Kristy Robertson (AUS)

24 August 2026
17:00

Spain	1–4	Germany
Giné 41'	Report	Krings 5'; Strauss 14'; Fleschütz 42'; Micheel 43'

Belfius Hockey Arena, Wavre
Umpires:
Aleisha Neumann (AUS)
Wanri Venter (RSA)

24 August 2026
20:30

Belgium	0–0	Argentina
	Report

Belfius Hockey Arena, Wavre
Umpires:
Hannah Harrison (ENG)
Sarah Wilson (SCO)

== Classification round ==
=== Pool G ===
Pos	Team	Pld	W	D	L	GF	GA	GD	Pts	Qualification
1	England	3	3	0	0	11	3	+8	9	Ninth place game
2	Japan	3	1	1	1	6	4	+2	4	Eleventh place game
3	South Africa	3	1	1	1	4	7	−3	4	13th place game
4	Chile	3	0	0	3	3	10	−7	0	15th place game

Source: FIH
Rules for classification: 1) points; 2) matches won; 3) goal difference; 4) goals for; 5) head-to-head result; 6) field goals scored.

21 August 2026
09:30

Japan	1–1	South Africa
Murayama 52'	Report	Mokoena 51'

Wagener Stadium, Amstelveen
Umpires:
Sean Edwards (ENG)
Magali Sergeant (BEL)

21 August 2026
12:30

England	4–1	Chile
Walker 5'; Bourne 29', 30'; Bingham 57'	Report	Valdivia 4'

Wagener Stadium, Amstelveen
Umpires:
Ayanna McClean (TTO)
Annelize Rostron (RSA)

23 August 2026
10:00

Chile	2–3	South Africa
Arrieta 13'; Avelli 51'	Report	Molikoe 22'; Mokoena 35'; Maree 48'

Wagener Stadium, Amstelveen
Umpires:
Amber Church (NZL)
Ayanna McClean (TTO)

23 August 2026
13:00

Japan	2–3	England
Kobayakawa 16'; Nishikori 38'	Report	Atkinson 2'; Hunt 8'; Balsdon 27'

Wagener Stadium, Amstelveen
Umpires:
Kim Yoon-seon (KOR)
Irene Presenqui (ARG)

=== Pool H ===
Pos	Team	Pld	W	D	L	GF	GA	GD	Pts	Qualification
1	United States	3	2	1	0	7	4	+3	7	Ninth place game
2	Scotland	3	2	0	1	6	5	+1	6	Eleventh place game
3	Ireland	3	1	0	2	5	7	−2	3	13th place game
4	New Zealand	3	0	1	2	4	6	−2	1	15th place game

Source: FIH
Rules for classification: 1) points; 2) matches won; 3) goal difference; 4) goals for; 5) head-to-head result; 6) field goals scored.

22 August 2026
11:30

Ireland	1–2	Scotland
Kealy 26'	Report	Mackenzie 6'; Watson 34'

Belfius Hockey Arena, Wavre
Umpires:
Hannah Harrison (ENG)
Rachel Williams (ENG)

22 August 2026
14:30

United States	1–1	New Zealand
Danahy 39'	Report	Surridge 8'

Belfius Hockey Arena, Wavre
Umpires:
Liu Xiaoying (CHN)
Wanri Venter (RSA)

24 August 2026
11:00

New Zealand	1–2	Scotland
Wang 23'	Report	Burnet 26'; McEwan 45'

Belfius Hockey Arena, Wavre
Umpires:
Liu Xiaoying (CHN)
Victoria Pazos (PAR)

24 August 2026
14:00

Ireland	1–3	United States
N. Carey 13'	Report	Adams 27'; Schoenbeck 42'; Tamer 52'

Belfius Hockey Arena, Wavre
Umpires:
Kristy Robertson (AUS)
Rachel Williams (ENG)

=== 15th place match ===
27 August 2026
11:00

Chile	2–3	New Zealand
Urroz 37', 45'	Report	K. Cotter 10'; Pho 50'; Doar 57'

Belfius Hockey Arena, Wavre
Umpires:
Wanri Venter (RSA)
Rachel Williams (ENG)

=== 13th place match ===
27 August 2026
09:30

South Africa	0–1	Ireland
	Report	M. Carey 14'

Wagener Stadium, Amstelveen
Umpires:
Ayanna McClean (TTO)
Sarah Wilson (SCO)

=== Eleventh place match ===
27 August 2026
12:30

Japan	2–1	Scotland
Suzuki 11'; Nakagomi 50'	Report	Mackenzie 58'

Wagener Stadium, Amstelveen
Umpires:
Amber Church (NZL)
Kim Yoon-seon (KOR)

=== Ninth place match ===
27 August 2026
14:00

England	3–1	United States
Neal 11'; Owsley 25'; Howard 55'	Report	Heck 20'

Belfius Hockey Arena, Wavre
Umpires:
Liu Xiaoying (CHN)
Victoria Pazos (PAR)

=== Seventh place match ===
27 August 2026
17:00

China	1–1	Spain
Yu 30'	Report	Segú 15'
Penalties
Li H. (penalty shoot-out missed); Liu C. (penalty shoot-out missed); Dan (penalty shoot-out missed); Fan (penalty shoot-out missed); Zhang (penalty shoot-out missed); Li H. (penalty shoot-out missed)	0–1	(penalty shoot-out missed) P. Jiménez; (penalty shoot-out missed) Vidosa; (penalty shoot-out missed) L. Jiménez; (penalty shoot-out missed) Agulló; (penalty shoot-out missed) Giné; (penalty shoot-out scored) L. Jiménez

Belfius Hockey Arena, Wavre
Umpires:
Kristy Robertson (AUS)
Magali Sergeant (BEL)

=== Fifth place match ===
27 August 2026
15:00

India	3–1	Germany
Ishika 43'; Navneet 44', 47'	Report	Krings 59'

Wagener Stadium, Amstelveen
Umpires:
Alison Keogh (IRL)
Annelize Rostron (RSA)

== First to fourth place classification ==
=== Bracket ===
Semi-finals
27 August
Netherlands	1
Belgium	0
27 August
Argentina	1
Australia	0

Final
29 August
Netherlands	1 (1)
Argentina (p.s.o.)	1 (3)
Third place
29 August
Belgium	1
Australia	0

=== Semifinals ===
27 August 2026
18:00

Netherlands	1–0	Belgium
Matla 28'	Report

Wagener Stadium, Amstelveen
Umpires:
Aleisha Neumann (AUS)
Irene Presenqui (ARG)

27 August 2026
20:30

Argentina	1–0	Australia
Jankunas 47'	Report

Belfius Hockey Arena, Wavre
Umpires:
Laurine Delforge (BEL)
Hannah Harrison (ENG)

=== Bronze medal match ===
29 August 2026
13:00

Belgium	1–0	Australia
Englebert 20'	Report

Wagener Stadium, Amstelveen
Umpires:
Alison Keogh (IRL)
Annelize Rostron (RSA)

=== Gold medal match ===
29 August 2026
16:00

Netherlands	1–1	Argentina
Y. Jansen 30'	Report 1 Report 2	M. Granatto 54'
Penalties
Sanders (penalty shoot-out missed); Albers (penalty shoot-out missed); Veen (penalty shoot-out scored); Moes (penalty shoot-out missed)	1–3	(penalty shoot-out scored) V. Granatto; (penalty shoot-out scored) Bruggesser; (penalty shoot-out missed) Díaz; (penalty shoot-out scored) Cairo

Wagener Stadium, Amstelveen
Attendance: 10,101
Umpires:
Amber Church (NZL)
Sarah Wilson (SCO)

== Final ranking ==
Pos	Grp	Team	Pld	W	D	L	GF	GA	GD	Pts	Final result
1st place, gold medalist(s)	B	Argentina	7	4	3	0	11	4	+7	15	Gold medal
2nd place, silver medalist(s)	A	Netherlands (H)	7	6	1	0	23	4	+19	19	Silver medal
3rd place, bronze medalist(s)	C	Belgium (H)	7	4	2	1	12	6	+6	14	Bronze medal
4	A	Australia	7	1	3	3	9	11	−2	6	Fourth place
5	D	India	6	2	3	1	11	6	+5	9	Fifth place
6	B	Germany	6	3	0	3	14	11	+3	9	Sixth place
7	C	Spain	6	2	2	2	9	11	−2	8	Seventh place
8	D	China	6	2	3	1	14	11	+3	9	Eight place
9	D	England	6	4	1	1	16	8	+8	13	Ninth place
10	B	United States	6	2	2	2	10	11	−1	8	Tenth place
11	A	Japan	6	2	1	3	8	16	−8	7	Eleventh place
12	B	Scotland	6	2	0	4	7	12	−5	6	Twelfth place
13	C	Ireland	6	2	0	4	9	12	−3	6	13th place
14	D	South Africa	6	1	1	4	6	19	−13	4	14th place
15	C	New Zealand	6	1	1	4	9	16	−7	4	15th place
16	A	Chile	6	0	1	5	9	19	−10	1	16th place

Source: FIH
(H) Hosts

== Goalscorers ==
There were 177 goals scored in 50 matches, for an average of 3.54 goals per match.

8 goals

- (Netherlands) Yibbi Jansen

5 goals

- (Netherlands) Marijn Veen

4 goals

- (Argentina) Agustina Gorzelany
- (Belgium) Charlotte Englebert
- (China) Zou Meirong
- (India) Navneet Kaur

3 goals

- (Australia) Claire Colwill
- (Australia) Abigail Wilson
- (Belgium) Stéphanie Vanden Borre
- (Chile) Manuela Urroz
- (China) Zhang Ying
- (England) Darcy Bourne
- (England) Tess Howard
- (Germany) Jette Fleschütz
- (Germany) Lynn Krings
- (Germany) Lisa Nolte
- (Netherlands) Felice Albers
- (Netherlands) Joosje Burg
- (Netherlands) Frédérique Matla
- (New Zealand) Katie Doar
- (Spain) Patricia Álvarez

2 goals

- (Argentina) María José Granatto
- (Belgium) Justine Rasir
- (China) Yu Anhui
- (England) Sophie Hamilton
- (England) Elizabeth Neal
- (India) Deepika Sehrawat
- (Ireland) Niamh Carey
- (Japan) Hiroka Murayama
- (New Zealand) Emelia Surridge
- (South Africa) Ntsopa Mokoena
- (Scotland) Ellie Mackenzie
- (Spain) Xantal Giné
- (United States) Mia Schoenbeck

1 goal

- (Argentina) Brisa Bruggesser
- (Argentina) Lara Casas
- (Argentina) Juana Castellaro
- (Argentina) Julieta Jankunas
- (Argentina) Eugenia Trinchinetti
- (Australia) Stephanie Kershaw
- (Australia) Courtney Schonell
- (Australia) Mariah Williams
- (Belgium) Ambre Ballenghien
- (Belgium) Delphine Marien
- (Belgium) Emma Puvrez
- (Chile) Fernanda Arrieta
- (Chile) Simone Avelli
- (Chile) Florencia Barrios
- (Chile) Laura Müller
- (Chile) Paula Valdivia
- (Chile) Fernanda Villagrán
- (China) Chen Yang
- (China) Chen Yi
- (China) Liu Chencheng
- (China) Ma Ning
- (China) Zhong Jiaqi
- (England) Alice Atkinson
- (England) Grace Balsdon
- (England) Charlotte Bingham
- (England) Holly Hunt
- (England) Lily Owsley
- (England) Lily Walker
- (Germany) Johanna Hachenberg
- (Germany) Lena Micheel
- (Germany) Sara Strauss
- (Germany) Yani Zhong
- (Germany) Sonja Zimmermann
- (India) Sushila Chanu
- (India) Lalremsiami Hmarzote
- (India) Ishika
- (India) Sunelita Toppo
- (India) Sakshi Rana
- (Ireland) Charlotte Beggs
- (Ireland) Michelle Carey
- (Ireland) Sarah Hawkshaw
- (Ireland) Emily Kealy
- (Ireland) Hannah McLoughlin
- (Ireland) Katie Mullan
- (Ireland) Róisín Upton
- (Japan) Miyu Hasegawa
- (Japan) Shiho Kobayakawa
- (Japan) Akari Nakagomi
- (Japan) Emi Nishikori
- (Japan) Miyu Suzuki
- (Japan) Maho Ueno
- (Netherlands) Freeke Moes
- (New Zealand) Hannah Cotter
- (New Zealand) Kaitlin Cotter
- (New Zealand) Riana Pho
- (New Zealand) Brittany Wang
- (Scotland) Fiona Burnet
- (Scotland) Heather McEwan
- (Scotland) Sarah Robertson
- (Scotland) Millie Steiger
- (Scotland) Charlotte Watson
- (South Africa) Paris-Gail Isaacs
- (South Africa) Caylin Maree
- (South Africa) Edith Molikoe
- (South Africa) Kayla de Waal
- (Spain) Lucía Jiménez
- (Spain) Sofía Keenan
- (Spain) Marta Segú
- (Spain) Laia Vidosa
- (United States) Lucy Adams
- (United States) Reese D'Ariano
- (United States) Claire Danahy
- (United States) Emma DeBerdine
- (United States) Sophia Gladieux
- (United States) Ryleigh Heck
- (United States) Ashley Sessa
- (United States) Abigail Tamer

Source: FIH

== Awards ==
2026 Women's FIH Hockey World Cup

Argentina
Third title

Team squad: Sofía Toccalino, Agustina Gorzelany, Valentina Raposo, Agostina Alonso, María Granatto (Captain), Cristina Cosentino, Victoria Sauze, Sofía Cairó, Victoria Granatto, Eugenia Trinchinetti, Lara Casas, Juana Castellaro, Paula Ortíz, Julieta Jankunas, Victoria Miranda, Zoe Díaz, Mercedes Artola, Emma Knobl, Brisa Bruggesser, Milagros Alastra.
Head Coach: Fernando Ferrara

The awards were announced on 29 August 2026.

Award	Player
Player of the tournament	(Belgium) Charlotte Englebert
Goalkeeper of the tournament	(Australia) Jocelyn Bartram
Young player of the tournament	(Argentina) Zoe Díaz

== Broadcasting rights ==
The television channels broadcasting the event was as follows:

=== Qualified teams ===
Territory	Rights holder
Argentina Chile	ESPN
Australia	Seven Sport
Belgium	VRT, RTL Play
China	Shanghai Media Group
England	Channel 4
Germany	Magenta Sport
India	Star Sports, Jio Hotstar
Ireland	RTÉ
Malaysia	RTN
Netherlands	NOS
Pakistan	Tapmad, PTV Sports
Spain	TDP, TVE
Scotland	BBC Alba
United States	CBS Sports
Wales	S4C
France Japan New Zealand South Africa	Watch.Hockey

=== Non-qualified teams ===
Territory	Rights holder
Americas	ESPN
Middle East	ON Sport
Canada	CBS Sports
South Asia	Star Sports 2, Jio Hotstar
Rest of World	Watch.Hockey

== See also ==
- 2026 Men's FIH Hockey World Cup
- 2026 FIH Para Hockey World Cup
