= Hockey at the 2022 Commonwealth Games =

Field hockey at the 2022 Commonwealth Games
- Venue: University of Birmingham Hockey and Squash Centre
- Dates: 29 July – 8 August 2022
- Competitors: 360 from 11 nations

Hockey at the 2022 Commonwealth Games was the seventh appearance of Hockey at the Commonwealth Games. The field hockey competition was among the sports contested at the 2022 Commonwealth Games, held in Birmingham, England. This was the seventh hockey edition since its debut in 1998, and the second staging within England specifically.

The tournaments took place between 29 July and 8 August 2022.

== Schedule ==
The competition schedule was as follows:

G	Group stage	CM	Classification matches	½	Semi-finals	B	Bronze medal match	F	Gold medal match

Date Event	Fri 29			Sat 30			Sun 31			Mon 1			Tue 2		Wed 3			Thu 4			Fri 5		Sat 6		Sun 7			Mon 8	
Session →	M	A	E	M	A	E	M	A	E	M	A	E	M	A	M	A	E	M	A	E	M	E	M	E	M		A	M	A
Men			G	G			G				G					G			G				CM	½			CM	B	F
Women	G				G				G	G			G		G			G			CM	½			CM	B	F		

Detailed fixtures were released on 9 March 2022.

== Venue ==
The tournaments were held at the University of Birmingham Hockey and Squash Centre, where the squash competition also took place.

== Qualification ==
Ten nations from at least four CGF regions qualified for each tournament at the 2022 Commonwealth Games:

- The host nation.
- The defending champions (unless already qualified as host country).
- The highest-ranked nations in the FIH World Rankings as of 1 February 2022, excluding those already qualified.

=== Men ===
Means of qualification	Date	Location	Quotas	Qualified
Host Nation	—N/a	—N/a	1	England
2018 Commonwealth Games	5–14 April 2018	(Australia) Gold Coast	1	Australia
FIH World Rankings	1 February 2022	—N/a	8	India; New Zealand; ~~Malaysia~~ (Note: The Malaysian Hockey Confederation withdrew from the Commonwealth Games in order to optimise preparation for the 2022 Asian Games, where the winning team will qualify for the 2024 Summer Olympics. At the time, the Asian Games were scheduled to take place in September 2022.); Canada; South Africa; Wales; Pakistan; Scotland; Ghana
TOTAL			10	

=== Women ===
Means of qualification	Date	Location	Quotas	Qualified
Host Nation	—N/a	—N/a	1	England
2018 Commonwealth Games	5–14 April 2018	(Australia) Gold Coast	1	New Zealand
FIH World Rankings	1 February 2022	—N/a	8	Australia; India; Canada; South Africa; Scotland; ~~Malaysia~~ (Note: The Malaysian Hockey Confederation withdrew from the Commonwealth Games in order to optimise preparation for the 2022 Asian Games, where the winning team will qualify for the 2024 Summer Olympics. At the time, the Asian Games were scheduled to take place in September 2022.); Wales; Ghana; Kenya
TOTAL			10	

;Scheduling issues

== Men's tournament ==
=== Group stage ===
==== Pool A ====
Pos	Team	Pld	W	D	L	GF	GA	GD	Pts	Qualification
1	Australia	4	4	0	0	29	2	+27	12	Semi-finals
2	South Africa	4	2	1	1	11	12	−1	7	Semi-finals
3	New Zealand	4	1	1	2	14	17	−3	4	Fifth place match
4	Pakistan	4	1	1	2	6	15	−9	4	Seventh place match
5	Scotland	4	0	1	3	11	25	−14	1	Ninth place match

Source: Birmingham 2022
Rules for classification: 1) points; 2) number of wins; 3) goal difference; 4) goals scored; 5) head-to-head results.

==== Pool B ====
Pos	Team	Pld	W	D	L	GF	GA	GD	Pts	Qualification
1	India	4	3	1	0	27	5	+22	10	Semi-finals
2	England (H)	4	3	1	0	25	8	+17	10	Semi-finals
3	Wales	4	2	0	2	14	10	+4	6	Fifth place match
4	Canada	4	0	1	3	4	25	−21	1	Seventh place match
5	Ghana	4	0	1	3	2	24	−22	1	Ninth place match

Source: Birmingham 2022
Rules for classification: 1) points; 2) number of wins; 3) goal difference; 4) goals scored; 5) head-to-head results.
(H) Hosts

=== Medal round ===
Semi-finals
6 August
Australia	3
England	2
6 August
India	3
South Africa	2

Gold medal match
8 August
Australia	7
India	0
Bronze medal match
8 August
England	6
South Africa	3

== Women's tournament ==
=== Group stage ===
==== Pool A ====
Pos	Team	Pld	W	D	L	GF	GA	GD	Pts	Qualification
1	England (H)	4	4	0	0	21	1	+20	12	Semi-finals
2	India	4	3	0	1	12	6	+6	9	Semi-finals
3	Canada	4	2	0	2	14	5	+9	6	Fifth place match
4	Wales	4	1	0	3	5	12	−7	3	Seventh place match
5	Ghana	4	0	0	4	1	29	−28	0	Ninth place match

Source: Birmingham 2022
Rules for classification: 1) points; 2) number of wins; 3) goal difference; 4) goals scored; 5) head-to-head results.
(H) Hosts

==== Pool B ====
Pos	Team	Pld	W	D	L	GF	GA	GD	Pts	Qualification
1	Australia	4	4	0	0	16	0	+16	12	Semi-finals
2	New Zealand	4	3	0	1	21	2	+19	9	Semi-finals
3	Scotland	4	2	0	2	15	5	+10	6	Fifth place match
4	South Africa	4	1	0	3	18	13	+5	3	Seventh place match
5	Kenya	4	0	0	4	0	50	−50	0	Ninth place match

Source: Birmingham 2022
Rules for classification: 1) points; 2) number of wins; 3) goal difference; 4) goals scored; 5) head-to-head results.

=== Medal round ===
Semi-finals
5 August
England	0 (2)
New Zealand	0 (0)
5 August
Australia	1 (3)
India	1 (0)

Gold medal match
7 August
England	2
Australia	1
Bronze medal match
7 August
New Zealand	1 (1)
India	1 (2)

== Medal summary ==
=== Medal table ===
* Host nation (England)

Rank	Nation	Gold	Silver	Bronze	Total
1	Australia	1	1	0	2
2	England*	1	0	1	2
3	India	0	1	1	2
Totals (3 entries)		2	2	2	6

=== Medalists ===
Event	Gold	Silver	Bronze
Men	Australia; Jake Harvie; Tom Wickham; Matt Dawson; Nathan Ephraums; Johan Durst; Jacob Anderson; Joshua Beltz; Eddie Ockenden; Jacob Whetton; Blake Govers; Joshua Simmonds; Tim Howard; Aran Zalewski; Flynn Ogilvie; Daniel Beale; Tim Brand; Andrew Charter; Jeremy Hayward	India; Jarmanpreet Singh; Abhishek; Surender Kumar; Manpreet Singh; Hardik Singh; Gurjant Singh; Mandeep Singh; Krishan Pathak; Harmanpreet Singh; Lalit Upadhyay; P. R. Sreejesh; Nilakanta Sharma; Shamsher Singh; Varun Kumar; Akashdeep Singh; Amit Rohidas; Jugraj Singh; Vivek Prasad	England; Jack Waller; Zachary Wallace; Chris Griffiths; Ian Sloan; Sam Ward; James Albery; Phil Roper; James Mazarelo; Stuart Rushmere; Brendan Creed; David Goodfield; Ollie Payne; Liam Ansell; David Condon; Nick Bandurak; Tom Sorsby; Rhys Smith; Will Calnan
Women	England; Maddie Hinch; Laura Unsworth; Anna Toman; Hannah Martin; Holly Hunt; Lily Walker; Elena Rayer; Tessa Howard; Isabelle Petter; Giselle Ansley; Hollie Pearne-Webb; Fiona Crackles; Sophie Hamilton; Shona McCallin; Sabbie Heesh; Lily Owsley; Flora Peel; Grace Balsdon	Australia; Claire Colwill; Ambrosia Malone; Amy Lawton; Penny Squibb; Aleisha Power; Georgia Wilson; Shanea Tonkin; Madison Fitzpatrick; Greta Hayes; Stephanie Kershaw; Kaitlin Nobbs; Jane Claxton; Jocelyn Bartram; Karri Somerville; Renee Taylor; Mariah Williams; Rebecca Greiner; Grace Stewart	India; Gurjit Kaur; Deep Grace Ekka; Monika Malik; Sonika Tandi; Sharmila Devi; Nikki Pradhan; Savita Punia; Rajani Etimarpu; Sangita Kumari; Nisha Warsi; Vandana Katariya; Udita Duhan; Lalremsiami; Jyoti; Navneet Kaur; Sushila Chanu; Salima Tete; Neha Goyal
