= Famke van Heel =

Belgian field hockey player (born 2008)

Personal information
- Born: 11 March 2008 (age 18) London, United Kingdom

Sport
- Sport: Field hockey
- Position: Forward
Senior career
Years	Team	Caps	Goals
2024–	Waterloo Ducks	-	-
National team
Years	Team	Caps	Goals
2025–	Belgium U–21	6	(3)
2026–	Belgium	16	(2)
Medal record
Women's field hockey
Representing Belgium
FIH World Cup
Bronze medal – third place	2026 Wavre–Amsterdam	Team
FIH Pro League
Bronze medal – third place	Season Seven	Team
FIH Junior World Cup
Bronze medal – third place	2025 Santiago	Team

Famke van Heel (born 11 March 2008) is a field hockey player from Belgium.

== Personal life ==
Van Heel was born in London, United Kingdom. She moved with her family to Sint-Genesius-Rode, a small municipality in Belgium when she was young. She is of Irish and Dutch descent.

== Career ==
=== Domestic hockey ===
Van Heel currently competes in the Carlsberg 0.0 Hockey League. She has been a member of the Waterloo Ducks first squad since 2024.

=== Under–21 ===
In 2025 van Heel made her junior international debut for the Belgian U–21 team. She was a member of the bronze medal winning squad at the FIH Junior World Cup in Santiago.

=== Red Panthers ===
Following an outstanding FIH Junior World Cup campaign in 2025, van Heel was elevated to the Red Panthers squad in 2026. She made her senior international debut during the seventh season of the FIH Pro League, during a match against Spain in Valencia.

She was included in the squad for the 2026 FIH World Cup in Wavre and Amsterdam. The Red Panthers won an historic bronze medal at the tournament, defeating Australia 1–0 in the bronze medal match. Van Heel was at the centre of controversy at the tournament, having scored an equaliser against the Netherlands in the semi-final, which was later disallowed by video umpire Ayanna McClean for a third party obstruction. The decision was widely criticised by the international hockey community.
