= Sabbie Heesh =

English field hockey player

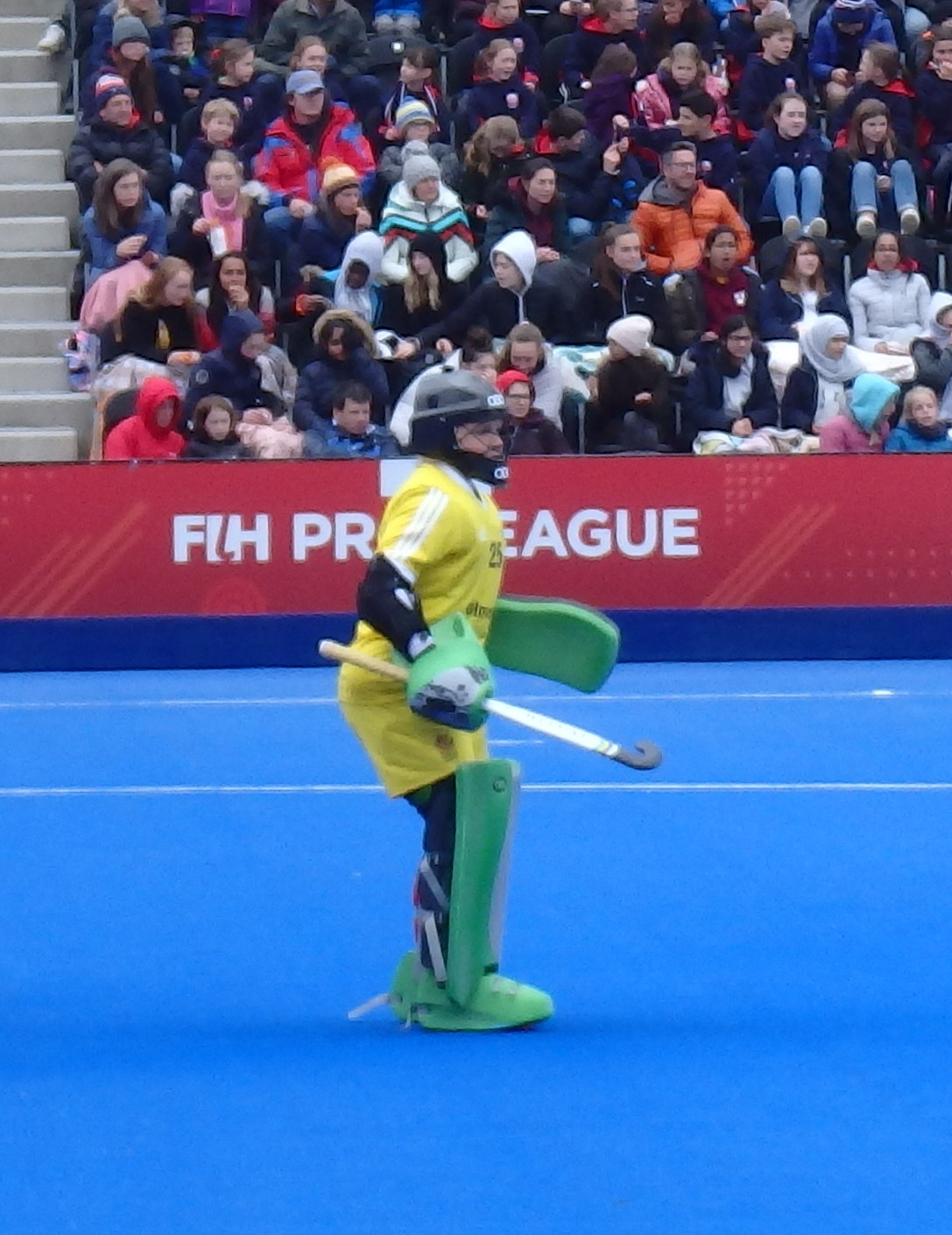
- Sabbie Heesh during the 2019 FIH Pro League game against USA

Personal information
- Born: 16 December 1991 (age 34) England

Sport
- Sport: Field hockey
- Position: Goalkeeper
- Club: Surbiton
National team
Years	Team	Caps	Goals
2017–present	England	2	(0)
2015–present	Great Britain	18	(0)
–	ENGLAND & GB TOTAL:	20	(0)
Medal record
Women's field hockey
Representing England
Commonwealth Games
Gold medal – first place	2022 Birmingham	Team
European Championships
Bronze medal – third place	2015 London
- Updated on 10 June 2021

Sabbie Heesh (/hɛʃ/ HESH; born 16 December 1991) is an English field hockey player who plays as a goalkeeper for Surbiton and the England and Great Britain national teams.

== Club career ==
She plays club hockey in the Women's England Hockey League Premier Division for Surbiton.

She has also played club hockey for Leicester, Loughborough Students, Bowdon & Hightown, Cannock and Belper.
