= 1987 Women's Field Hockey Olympic Qualifier =

The 1987 Women's Hockey Olympic Qualifier was held in Edinburgh, Scotland in April 1987. Six nations took part, and they played a round robin.

== Final rankings ==
Teams in bold are qualified

1. **Canada**
2. **Germany**
3. **Great Britain**
4. **China**
5. United States
6. Australia
