= Great Britain national field hockey team =

Great Britain national field hockey team may refer to:

- Great Britain men's national field hockey team
- Great Britain women's national field hockey team
