= Katie Curtis =

Katie Curtis may refer to:

- Katie Prankerd, née Curtis, Welsh cyclist
- Katie Curtis (field hockey), English field hockey player

== See also ==
- Catie Curtis, American singer-songwriter
