= Joie Leigh =

English field hockey player

Personal information
- Full name: Joanna Faye Leigh
- Born: 22 February 1993 (age 33) England

Sport
- Sport: Field hockey
- Position: Midfielder
- Club: Hampstead & Westminster
National team
Years	Team	Caps	Goals
2013–2017	England	15	(1)
2014–2016	Great Britain	33	(2)
Medal record
Women's field hockey
Representing England

Joanna "Joie" Faye Leigh (born 22 February 1993) is an English international field hockey player who played as a midfielder for England and Great Britain.

She plays club hockey in the Women's England Hockey League Premier Division for Hampstead & Westminster

Leigh has also played for Clifton Robinsons.
