= Isabelle Petter =

English field hockey player

Izzy Petter
Personal information
- Full name: Isabelle Catherine May Petter
- Born: 27 June 2000 (age 26) Guildford, Surrey, England

Sport
- Sport: Field hockey
- Position: Forward/ Midfielder
- Club: Surbiton
National team
Years	Team	Caps	Goals
2019–present	England	61	(6)
2019–present	Great Britain	70	(10)
–	ENGLAND & GB TOTAL: 131		(16)
Medal record
Women's field hockey
Representing Great Britain
Olympic Games
Bronze medal – third place	2020 Tokyo	Team
Representing England
Commonwealth Games
Gold medal – first place	2022 Birmingham	Team
- Updated on 21 February 2022

Isabelle Catherine May Petter (born 27 June 2000) is an English field hockey player who plays as a forward for the England and Great Britain national teams.

== Biography ==
Petter has played for GB and England hockey since 2019. Medalling at the Tokyo 2020 Olympics and winning a Commonwealth Gold with England in 2022. She participated in the 2024 Paris olympics as well as multiple Europeans.

In her younger years she played for Surbiton winning multiple national titles.

Petter played club hockey in the Women's England Hockey League Premier Division for Loughborough Students before returning to Surbiton Hockey Club. Winning 3 national titles in her time with Surbiton.

she has recently returned from spending a season in Hamburg with HTHC in Germany.
