= Olivia Hamilton (field hockey) =

English field hockey player

Personal information
- Born: 28 February 2001 (age 25)

Sport
- Sport: Field hockey
- Position: Defender
- Club: Loughborough Students
National team
Years	Team	Caps	Goals
2022–present	England	1	(0)
2022-present	Great Britain	0	(0)
–	ENGLAND & GB TOTAL:	1	(0)
Medal record
Women's field hockey
Representing England
- Updated on 21 February 2022

Olivia "Liv" Hamilton (born 28 February 2001) is an English field hockey player who plays as a defender for Loughborough Students and the England and Great Britain national teams.

== Club career ==
Hamilton plays club hockey in the Women's England Hockey League Premier Division for Loughborough Students. She previously played for Team Bath Buccaneers.

== Personal life ==
She has a twin sister, Sophie, who plays with her on the national team.
