= Chloe Walton =

Canadian field hockey player

Personal information
- Born: 28 April 2000 (age 26) North Vancouver, Canada
- Height: 175 cm (5 ft 9 in)

Sport
- Sport: Field hockey
- Position: Forward
- Club: University of Nottingham HC
National team
Years	Team	Caps	Goals
2021–	Canada	25	(3)

Chloe Walton (born 28 April 2000) is a field hockey player from Canada.

== Early life ==
Chloe Walton was born and raised in North Vancouver, a suburb of Vancouver, in the province of British Columbia in Western Canada.

She is a former student of the University of Maine.

== Career ==
=== Domestic hockey ===
At domestic level, Walton currently competes in England. She is a member of the University of Nottingham HC squad in the England Hockey League.

=== Senior national team ===
Walton made her senior international debut for Canada in 2021. She earned her first international cap during a test match against the United States in Chula Vista.

Following her debut in 2021, Walton received her first call-up to represent Canada at a major tournament in 2022. She was named in the squad to represent Team Canada at the XXII Commonwealth Games in Birmingham. During the tournament, she scored her first international goal.

In 2023 she was a member of the national squad at the XIX Pan American Games in Santiago.

Since her debut, Walton has made sporadic appearances for the national team. She has most recently been named in the squad for the 2025 Pan American Cup in Montevideo.

Major International Tournaments

- XXII Commonwealth Games – Birmingham
- XIX Pan American Games – Santiago
- 2024 FIH Olympic Qualifiers – Valencia
- 2023–24 FIH Nations Cup – Terrassa

== International goals ==
The following is a list of goals scored by Walton at international level.

Goal	Date	Location	Opponent	Score	Result	Competition	Ref.
1	2 August 2022	University of Birmingham Hockey Centre, Birmingham, England	Ghana	1–0	8–1	XXII Commonwealth Games	
2	26 October 2023	Claudia Schüler National Hockey Centre, Santiago, Chile	Cuba	2–0	7–1	XIX Pan American Games	
3	26 October 2023	Claudia Schüler National Hockey Centre, Santiago, Chile	Cuba	5–0	7–1	XIX Pan American Games	
