= Ellie Rayer =

English field hockey player

Personal information
- Full name: Elena Sian Rayer
- Born: 22 November 1996 (age 29) Maidenhead, England
- Height: 1.69 m (5 ft 7 in)
- Weight: 65 kg (143 lb)

Sport
- Sport: Field hockey
- Position: Midfielder or Forward
- Club: East Grinstead
National team
Years	Team	Caps	Goals
2017–	England	30	(0)
2018–	Great Britain	16	(1)
Medal record
Women's field hockey
Representing Great Britain
Olympic Games
Bronze medal – third place	2020 Tokyo	Team
Representing England
Commonwealth Games
Gold medal – first place	2022 Birmingham	Team
Bronze medal – third place	2018 Gold Coast	Team
European Championships
Bronze medal – third place	2017 Amsterdam

Elena Sian Rayer (born 22 November 1996) is an English international field hockey player who plays as a midfielder or forward for England and Great Britain.

Rayer plays club hockey in the Women's England Hockey League Premier Division for East Grinstead.
