= Darcy Bourne =

English field hockey player (born 2001)

Personal information
- Born: 13 October 2001 (age 24) London

Sport
- Sport: Field hockey
- Position: Forward
- Club: Surbiton
National team
| Years | Team | Caps | Goals |
| 2022– | England | 47 | (10) |
| 2022– | Great Britain | 5 | (1) |
| – | Total | 52 | (11) |
Medal record
Women's field hockey
Representing England

Darcy Tabitha Bourne (born 13 October 2001) is an English field hockey player who plays as a forward for Surbiton and the England and Great Britain national teams.

== Biography ==
Bourne was educated at Wellington College, Berkshire.

She re-joined Surbiton in the Women's England Hockey League after playing in the United States for Duke Blue Devils for the 2020–21 season.

During the 2024–25 Women's England Hockey League season she was part of the Surbiton team that finished runner-up in the league behind Reading.
