= Ellie Mackenzie =

Scottish field hockey player

Personal information
- Born: 30 December 2002 (age 23) Scotland

Sport
- Sport: Field hockey
- Position: Midfield
- Club: Surbiton
National team
Years	Team	Caps	Goals
2022–2022	Scotland U–21	5	(0)
2024–	Scotland	22	(2)
Medal record
Women's field hockey
Representing Scotland

Ellie Mackenzie (born 30 December 2002) is an international field hockey player from Scotland.

== Education ==
Mackenzie is an alumna of the Mary Erskine School.

== Career ==
=== Domestic league ===
In the English Hockey League, she plays for Surbiton.

=== Under–21 ===
Mackenzie made her international debut at under–21 level. She debuted for the Scotland U–21 team at the 2022 EuroHockey U–21 Championship in Ghent, where the team finished in eighth place.

=== Senior national team ===
In 2024, Mackenzie received her first call-up to the senior national team. She made her senior international debut later that year, earning her first cap during a test match against Canada in Glasgow.

She made her major tournament debut in 2025, representing the national team at the 2024–25 FIH Nations Cup in Santiago. Later that year she went on to appear at the EuroHockey Championships in Mönchengladbach, finishing in sixth.

She was named in the Great Britain EDP for 2026.

Mackenzie was a member of the squad that qualified for the 2026 FIH World Cup, the first time since 2002 that Scotland have qualified.
