= Sofía Keenan =

Australian field hockey player

Personal information
- Full name: Sofía Teresa Keenan Capurro
- Born: 19 September 2004 (age 21) Italy

Sport
- Sport: Field hockey
- Position: Forward
Senior career
Years	Team	Caps	Goals
–	Club Ègara	-	-
National team
Years	Team	Caps	Goals
2025–2025	Spain U–21	6	(0)
2026–	Spain	6	(1)
Medal record
Women's field hockey
Representing Spain

Sofía Teresa Keenan Capurro (born 19 September 2004) is a field hockey player who plays as a forward for Club Egara and the Spain national team.

== Early life ==
Keenan is a child of an Argentine couple. She was born in Italy, and moved to the Barcelona area of Spain at a young age.

She comes from a hockey family, with her father Patricio, her uncle Santiago, and her brother Nicolás all representing the Argentine national team. Her other brother Thomas also represented the Italian national team.

== Career ==
=== Domestic league ===
In the Liga Iberdrola and Euro Hockey League, Keenan represents Club Ègara.

=== Under–21 ===
Keenan was a member of the Spanish U–21 team at the 2025 FIH Junior World Cup in Santiago.

=== Redsticks ===
In 2026 Keenan made her senior international debut for Las Redsticks. She earned her first senior cap in a match against Belgium during the 2025–26 FIH Pro League in Valencia. Following her debut, she was named in the national squad for the 2026 FIH World Cup in Amsterdam and Wavre.

== International goals ==
The following is a list of international goals scored by Keenan.

Goal	Date	Location	Opponent	Score	Result	Competition	Ref.
1	16 August 2026	Belfius Hockey Arena, Wavre, Belgium	Ireland	2–1	3–2	2026 FIH World Cup	
