= Flora Peel =

English field hockey player

Personal information
- Full name: Flora Adeline Peel
- Born: 19 September 1996 (age 30) Cheltenham, Gloucestershire, England

Sport
- Sport: Field hockey
- Position: Midfield
- Club: Wimbledon Hockey Club
National team
Years	Team	Caps	Goals
2022–	England	30	(1)
2022–	Great Britain	19	(0)
Medal record
Women's field hockey
Representing England
Commonwealth Games
Gold medal – first place	2022 Birmingham	Team
- Updated on 18 June 2024

Flora Adeline Peel (born 19 September 1996) is an English field hockey player who won a gold medal as part of the England team at the 2022 Commonwealth Games. She was also a member of the Great Britain squad at the 2024 Summer Olympics.

== Career ==
Having previously played international hockey at youth level, Peel made her senior England debut in February 2022 in the FIH Pro League.

She set up both goals as England beat Australia 2–1 to win Commonwealth Games hockey gold for the first time at Birmingham 2022.

Selected for the training squad earlier in the year, Peel made her first appearance for Great Britain against Argentina on 15 December 2022.

After missing the previous year's Women's FIH Hockey World Cup due to injury, she was in the England team that placed fourth at the 2023 Women's EuroHockey Championship.

On 18 June 2024, Peel was named in the 16-player Great Britain squad to compete at the 2024 Summer Olympics in Paris. The team went out in the quarter-finals.

== Personal life ==
Born in Cheltenham, Peel spent much of her childhood living in France where she learned to ski, going on to win a British Skiing Championships title in slalom. She attended the University of Birmingham. Her five-times great-grandfather is former United Kingdom Prime Minister and Metropolitan Police founder Sir Robert Peel.
