= Guadalupe Fernández Lacort =

Argentine field hockey player

Personal information
- Born: 1 August 1996 (age 30) Argentina
- Height: 165 cm (5 ft 5 in)
- Weight: 54 kg (119 lb)

Sport
- Sport: Field hockey
- Position: Defender
- Club: Banco Provincia
National team
Years	Team	Caps	Goals
2020–	Argentina		-
Medal record
Junior World Cup
Gold medal – first place	2016 Santiago

Guadalupe Fernández Lacort (born 1 August 1996) is an Argentinian field hockey player.

== Hockey career ==
She was the part of the Argentine team that won the 2016 Women's Hockey Junior World Cup after a beating the Netherlands in the finals.

In 2020, Fernández was called into the senior national women's team.
