= England women's national field hockey team =

England
- Association: England Hockey
- Head Coach: David Ralph
- Assistant coach(es): Jon Bleby; Kwandwane Browne; Mark Hickman
- Manager: Samantha Beveridge
- Captain: Flora Peel
Home	Away

FIH ranking
- Current: 8 ▼1 (3 October 2026)

World Cup
- Appearances: 12 (first in 1983)
- Best result: (bronze) 3rd (2010)

EuroHockey Championship
- Appearances: 17 (first in 1984)
- Best result: (gold) 1st (1991, 2015)

The England women's national field hockey team are the current Commonwealth Games champions having previously won silver 3 times. England have also won the 2006 Women's Field Hockey World Cup Qualifier and the 2002 Champions Challenge.

== History ==
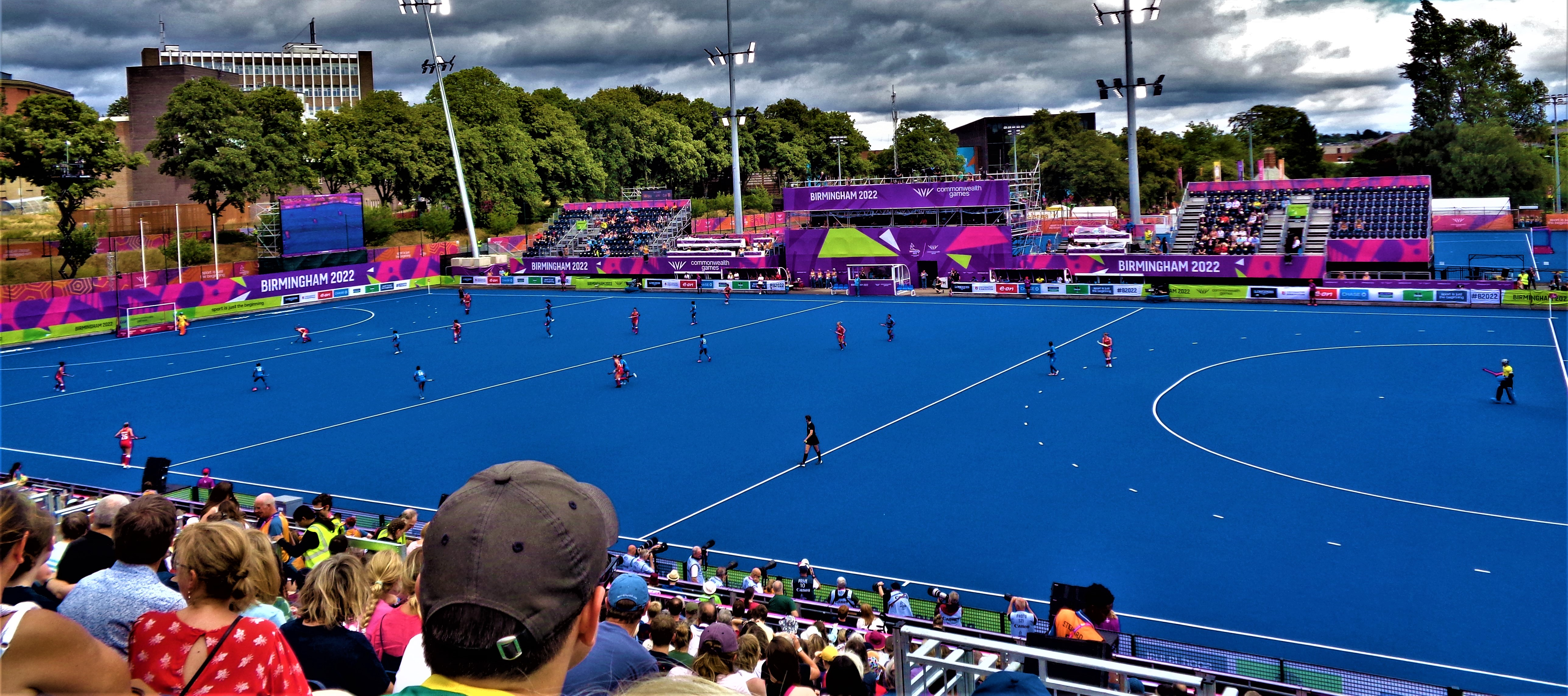
Englands vs India at the 2022 Commonwealth Games.

Marjorie Pollard played hockey nearly every year for England from 1921 to 1937.

The team toured New Zealand in 1938 and the US in 1947. Notable players were Barbara and Bridget West, Hilda Light and Mary Russell Vick. The teams had to play in long stockings whatever the heat until they were replaced with split skirts and knee high stockings.

== Competitive record ==
=== World Cup ===
- 1983 – 5th place
- 1986 – 5th place
- 1990 – 4th place
- 1994 – 9th place
- 1998 – 9th place
- 2002 – 5th place
- 2006 – 7th place
- 2010 – (bronze)
- 2014 – 11th place
- 2018 – 7th place
- 2022 – 8th place
- 2026 – 9th place

=== Commonwealth Games ===
- 1998 – (silver)
- 2002 – (silver)
- 2006 – (bronze)
- 2010 – (bronze)
- 2014 – (silver)
- 2018 – (bronze)
- 2022 – (gold)

=== World League ===
- 2012–13 – (bronze)
- 2014–15 – 7th place
- 2016–17 – 4th place

=== Pro League ===
- 2021–22 – 7th place
- 2024–25 – 8th place
- 2025–26 – 7th place

=== EuroHockey Nations Championship ===
- 1984 – 4th place
- 1987 – (silver)
- 1991 – (gold)
- 1995 – 4th place
- 1999 – (bronze)
- 2003 – 4th place
- 2005 – (bronze)
- 2007 – (bronze)
- 2009 – (bronze)
- 2011 – (bronze)
- 2013 – (silver)
- 2015 – (gold)
- 2017 – (bronze)
- 2019 – 4th place
- 2021 – 5th place
- 2023 – 4th place
- 2025 – 5th place
- 2027 – Qualified

=== Champions Challenge ===
- 2002 – (gold)
- 2005 – 4th place
- 2007 – (bronze)

=== Champions Trophy ===
- 2002 – 6th place
- 2003 – 5th place
- 2009 – 6th place
- 2010 – (bronze)
- 2011 – 5th place
- 2014 – 5th place

== Current squad ==
The squad for the 2026 Women's FIH Hockey World Cup.

Head coach: David Ralph

2. Darcy Bourne
4. Lily Walker
6. Anna Toman
7. Hannah French
10. Amy Thompson
11. Holly Hunt
13. Elena Rayer
14. Tessa Howard
18. Katharine Curtis
21. Fiona Crackles
22. Elizabeth Neal
23. Sophie Hamilton
25. Sabrina Heesh (GK)
26. Lily Owsley
28. Flora Peel (C)
30. Martha Taylor
31. Grace Balsdon
39. Alice Atkinson
40. Miriam Pritchard (GK)
44. Charlotte Bingham

== Results and fixtures ==
The following is a list of match results in the last 12 months, as well as any future matches that have been scheduled.

Win Draw Loss Fixture

=== 2025 ===
9 December 2025 Ireland Leg	England	0–3	Belgium	Dublin, Ireland
14:00		Report	Vanden Borre 7', 38'; Englebert 58'	Stadium: Sport Ireland Campus

11 December 2025 Ireland Leg	Ireland	1–1 (4–3 p)	England	Dublin, Ireland
14:00	Torrans 26'	Report	Rayer 36'	Stadium: Sport Ireland Campus
	Penalties
	Beggs (penalty shoot-out scored); McMaster (penalty shoot-out missed); Power (penalty shoot-out scored); McLoughlin (penalty shoot-out scored); Hawkshaw (penalty shoot-out missed); McLoughlin (penalty shoot-out scored)		(penalty shoot-out missed) S. Hamilton; (penalty shoot-out scored) Bourne; (penalty shoot-out scored) Rayer; (penalty shoot-out scored) Owsley; (penalty shoot-out missed) Howard; (penalty shoot-out missed) S. Hamilton

12 December 2025 Ireland Leg	Belgium	2–1	England	Dublin, Ireland
14:00	Englebert 42'; Vanden Borre 59'	Report	Bourne 14'	Stadium: Sport Ireland Campus

14 December 2025 Ireland Leg	Ireland	1–2	England	Dublin, Ireland
14:00	Perdue 53'	Report	Howard 4'; Hunt 50'	Stadium: Sport Ireland Campus

=== 2026 ===
6 February 2026 China Leg	England	0–3	Netherlands	Guangzhou, China
19:30		Report	Jansen 3', 28'; Matla 9'	Stadium: Yunfu Education Park Hockey Field

7 February 2026 China Leg	China	3–2	England	Guangzhou, China
17:00	Ma 53'; Hao 53'; Fan 57'	Report	Howard 34', 44'	Stadium: Yunfu Education Park Hockey Field

9 February 2026 China Leg	Netherlands	3–1	England	Guangzhou, China
19:30	Burg 27'; Y. Jansen 33'; P. Dicke 60'	Report	Bourne 13'	Stadium: Yunfu Education Park Hockey Field

10 February 2026 China Leg	China	0–2	England	Guangzhou, China
19:30		Report	Balsdon 8'; Howard 51'	Stadium: Yunfu Education Park Hockey Field

8 March 2026 World Cup Qualifiers Pool A	England	5–2	Italy	Hyderabad, India
12:45	Balsdon 12', 32'; Bingham 15'; Neal 16'; Toman 27'	Report	Pessina 19'; Carta 46'	Stadium: G. M. C. Balayogi Hockey Ground

9 March 2026 World Cup Qualifiers Pool A	South Korea	0–3	England	Hyderabad, India
15:00		Report	Walker 16'; Neal 38'; Balsdon 44'	Stadium: G. M. C. Balayogi Hockey Ground

11 March 2026 World Cup Qualifiers Pool A	England	2–0	Austria	Hyderabad, India
12:45	Balsdon 20'; Hunt 48'	Report		Stadium: G. M. C. Balayogi Hockey Ground

13 March 2026 World Cup Qualifiers Semi Final	England	2–0	Scotland	Hyderabad, India
17:15	Bingham 25'; Bourne 29'	Report		Stadium: G. M. C. Balayogi Hockey Ground

14 March 2026 World Cup Qualifiers Final	England	2–0	India	Hyderabad, India
19:30	Balsdon 13'; Neal 43'	Report		Stadium: G. M. C. Balayogi Hockey Ground

13 June 2026 England Leg	England	1–2	Germany	London, England
15:00	Howard 59'	Report	Fleschütz 26'; Hachenberg 34'	Stadium: Lee Valley Hockey and Tennis Centre

14 June 2026 England Leg	England	0–3	Germany	London, England
15:00		Report	Wiedermann 13'; Heusgen 45'; Hachenberg 48'	Stadium: Lee Valley Hockey and Tennis Centre

20 June 2026 England Leg	England	0–3	Australia	London, England
15:00		Report	Colwill 9', 27'; Arnott 17'	Stadium: Lee Valley Hockey and Tennis Centre

21 June 2026 England Leg	England	2–2 (3–4 p)	Australia	London, England
14:00	Toman 2', 3'	Report	Kershaw 26', 32'	Stadium: Lee Valley Hockey and Tennis Centre
	Penalties
	Bourne (penalty shoot-out missed); Rayer (penalty shoot-out scored); Crackles (penalty shoot-out scored); Hamilton (penalty shoot-out missed); Owsley (penalty shoot-out missed); Bourne (penalty shoot-out scored); Rayer (penalty shoot-out missed); Crackles (penalty shoot-out missed); Hamilton (penalty shoot-out missed)		(penalty shoot-out scored) Kershaw; (penalty shoot-out missed) Williams; (penalty shoot-out missed) Lawton; (penalty shoot-out scored) Nobbs; (penalty shoot-out missed) Stewart; (penalty shoot-out scored) Nobbs; (penalty shoot-out missed) Kershaw; (penalty shoot-out missed) Williams; (penalty shoot-out scored) Lawton

24 June 2026 England Leg	England	0–1	Spain	London, England
11:00		Report	Amundson 27'	Stadium: Lee Valley Hockey and Tennis Centre

25 June 2026 England Leg	England	0–0 (4–2 p)	Argentina	London, England
17:00		Report		Stadium: Lee Valley Hockey and Tennis Centre
	Penalties
	Crackles (penalty shoot-out scored); Bourne (penalty shoot-out scored); Bingham (penalty shoot-out missed); Curtis (penalty shoot-out scored); Howard (penalty shoot-out scored)		(penalty shoot-out scored) Bruggesser; (penalty shoot-out missed) Miranda; (penalty shoot-out missed) V. Granatto; (penalty shoot-out scored) Cairó

27 June 2026 England Leg	England	4–2	Spain	London, England
13:30	Howard 10'; Hamilton 22'; Owsley 51'; Bourne 59'	Report	Molina 11'; Amundson 52'	Stadium: Lee Valley Hockey and Tennis Centre

28 June 2026 England Leg	England	3–2	Argentina	London, England
13:30	Toman 11'; Rayer 16'; Hunt 33'	Report	Trinchinetti 5'; Gorzelany 45+'	Stadium: Lee Valley Hockey and Tennis Centre

30 July 2026 Friendly match 1	Netherlands	3–1	England

16 August 2026 World Cup Pool D	England	4–0	South Africa	Amstelveen, Netherlands
10:00	Bourne 10'; Howard 13'; Neal 30'; Hamilton 41'	Report		Stadium: Wagener Stadium

18 August 2026 World Cup Pool D	England	2–4	China	Amstelveen, Netherlands
12:30	Howard 54'; Hamilton 57'	Report	Zou 18', 35'; Chen 22'; Liu 23'	Stadium: Wagener Stadium

20 August 2026 World Cup Pool D	India	0–0	England	Amstelveen, Netherlands
15:00		Report		Stadium: Wagener Stadium

21 August 2026 World Cup Pool G	England	4–1	Chile	Amstelveen, Netherlands
12:30	Walker 5'; Bourne 29', 30'; Bingham 57'	Report	Valdivia 4'	Stadium: Wagener Stadium

23 August 2026 World Cup Pool G	Japan	2–3	England	Amstelveen, Netherlands
13:00	Kobayakawa 16'; Nishikori 38'	Report	Atkinson 2'; Hunt 8'; Balsdon 27'	Stadium: Wagener Stadium

27 August 2026 World Cup 9th place match	England	3–1	United States	Wavre, Belgium
14:00	Neal 11'; Owsley 25'; Howard 55'	Report	Heck 20'	Stadium: Belfius Hockey Arena

== See also ==
- England men's national field hockey team
- Great Britain men's national field hockey team
- Great Britain women's national field hockey team
