= Lizzie Neal =

English international field hockey player

Personal information
- Born: 8 October 1998 (age 27) England

Sport
- Sport: Field hockey
- Position: Defender or Midfielder
- Club: Reading
National team
| Years | Team | Caps | Goals |
| 2016–2017 | England U21 | 14 | (0) |
| 2021– | England | 5 | (0) |
| 2019– | Great Britain | 22 | (2) |
Medal record
Women's field hockey
Representing Great Britain
- Updated on 18 February 2022

Elizabeth Ann Neal (born 8 October 1998) is an English field hockey player who plays as a defender/midfielder for the England and Great Britain national teams.

== Biography ==
Neal played club hockey in the Women's England Hockey League Division 1 South for Canterbury and also played for Loughborough Students

At the end of the 2024 season, she joined Reading from Wimbledon.

During the 2024–25 Women's England Hockey League season she was part of the Reading Hockey Club team that won the league title.
