= Cristina Cosentino =

Argentine field hockey player

Personal information
- Born: 22 December 1997 (age 28) Argentina
- Height: 178 cm (5 ft 10 in)
- Weight: 70 kg (154 lb)

Sport
- Sport: Field hockey
- Position: Goalkeeper
- Club: Banco Nación
National team
Years	Team	Caps	Goals
2019–	Argentina	17	-
Medal record
Olympic Games
Bronze medal – third place	2024 Paris	Team
World Cup
Gold medal – first place	2026 Wavre/Amstelveen
Pan American Games
Gold medal – first place	2023 Santiago	Team
Pan American Cup
Gold medal – first place	2025 Montevideo
Junior World Cup
Gold medal – first place	2016 Santiago
Youth Olympic Games
Bronze medal – third place	2014 Nanjing	Team

Cristina Cosentino (born 22 December 1997) is an Argentine field hockey goalkeeper.

== Hockey career ==
She was part of the Argentine team that won the 2016 Women's Hockey Junior World Cup after beating the Netherlands in the finals.

In 2019, Cosentino was called into the senior national women's team. She competed in the team that finished fourth at the 2019 Pro League in Amstelveen.

In 2024, she won the bronze medal with Las Leonas at the 2024 Paris Summer Olympics.
