= Holly Hunt (field hockey) =

English international field hockey player

Personal information
- Born: 15 March 1997 (age 29) England

Sport
- Sport: Field hockey
- Position: Midfielder or Forward
- Club: Hampstead & Westminster
National team
Years	Team	Caps	Goals
2019–	England	2	(1)
2019–present	Great Britain	2	(0)
–	ENGLAND & GB TOTAL:	4	(1)
Medal record
Women's field hockey
Representing England
Commonwealth Games
Gold medal – first place	2022 Birmingham	Team
- Updated on 13 June 2021

Holly Elizabeth Hunt (born 15 March 1997) is an English field hockey player who plays as a midfielder or forward for Hampstead & Westminster and the England and Great Britain national teams.

Hunt won a Commonwealth gold medal at Birmingham in August 2022 with the England hockey team. She scored the first goal in the final in a 2-1 win over Australia. It was the first time in history that England had won the Commonwealth gold.

She was educated at Stockport Grammar School, Stockport, England.

In April 2021 Hunt joined the hockey coaching staff at Pangbourne College, Pangbourne, Berkshire.

== Club career ==
She plays club hockey in the Women's England Hockey League Premier Division for Hampstead & Westminster.

Hunt has also played for University of Birmingham and Bowdon Hightown.
