= Anna Toman =

English field hockey player

Personal information
- Full name: Anna Frances Toman
- Born: 29 April 1993 (age 33) Derby, England
- Height: 1.63 m (5 ft 4 in)
- Weight: 58 kg (128 lb)

Sport
- Sport: Field hockey
- Position: Midfielder or Defender
- Club: Wimbledon
National team
Years	Team	Caps	Goals
2017–present	England	67	(5)
2017–present	Great Britain	65	(8)
–	ENGLAND & GB TOTAL:	132	(13)
Medal record
Women's field hockey
Representing United Kingdom
Olympic Games
Bronze medal – third place	2020 Tokyo	Team
Representing England
Commonwealth Games
Gold medal – first place	2022 Birmingham	Team
Bronze medal – third place	2018 Gold Coast	Team
European Championships
Bronze medal – third place	2017 Amsterdam
- Updated on 16 March 2024

Anna Frances Toman (born 29 April 1993) is an English field hockey player who plays as a midfielder or defender for Wimbledon and the England and Great Britain national teams.

== Club career ==
Toman plays club hockey for Wimbledon.

She has also played for SCHC, Uni of Birmingham and Belper.

== International career ==
Toman made her senior international debut for England against South Africa on 25 February 2017.
