= Miriam Pritchard =

English field hockey player

Personal information
- Full name: Miriam Rose O'Neill Pritchard
- Born: 21 December 1998 (age 27) Loughborough, Leicestershire, England

Sport
- Sport: Field hockey
- Position: Goalkeeper
Senior career
Years	Team	Caps	Goals
–2021	Loughborough Students	-	-
2021–2022	Hampstead & Westminster	-	-
2022–2023	Holcombe	-	-
2023–2026	Hampstead & Westminster	-	-
National team
Years	Team	Caps	Goals
2017–present	England	2	(0)
2020–present	Great Britain	0	(0)
Medal record
Women's field hockey
Representing England
EuroHockey Junior Championship
Bronze medal – third place	2017 Valencia

Miriam Rose O'Neill Pritchard (born 21 December 1998) is an English international field hockey player who plays as a goalkeeper for England and Great Britain.

== Biography ==
Pritchard played hockey for Loughborough Students in the Women's England Hockey League.

She made her England debut on 23 May 2017 and was part of the 2018 Women's Hockey World Cup squad in London.

She left Loughborough to join Hampstead & Westminster for the 2021–22 season.
