= Lily Walker =

English field hockey player

Personal information
- Full name: Lily Mae Walker
- Born: 5 June 2002 (age 24) Cannock, England

Sport
- Sport: Field hockey
- Position: Midfield
- Club: East Grinstead
National team
| Years | Team | Caps | Goals |
| 2019 | England U–21 | 4 | (1) |
| 2022– | England | 30 | (0) |
| 2023– | Great Britain | 25 | (0) |
Medal record
Women's field hockey
Representing England
Commonwealth Games
| Gold medal – first place | 2022 Birmingham | Team |

Lily Mae Walker is an English field hockey player.

== Early life ==
Lily Walker was born in Cannock, England, on 5 June 2002.

== Career ==
=== Under–21 ===
In 2019, Walker made her debut for the England U–21 team at the EuroHockey Junior Championship in Valencia.

=== Senior national teams ===
Walker has represented both England and Great Britain in senior competition.

==== England ====
In 2022, Walker debuted for the English national team during season three of the FIH Pro League. She later competed at the 2022 FIH World Cup in Terrassa and Amsterdam, where the team finished in eighth place. She concluded her 2022 season by winning a gold medal at the XXII Commonwealth Games in Birmingham.

Walker was a member of the England squad at the 2023 EuroHockey Championship in Mönchengladbach.

==== Great Britain ====
Following her England debut, Walker received a call-up to the Great Britain squad in 2023, where she made her debut during season four of the FIH Pro League.
