= Sophie Hamilton =

English field hockey player

Personal information
- Born: 28 February 2001 (age 25) Banbury, England

Sport
- Sport: Field hockey
- Position: midfielder
- Club: Surbiton
National team
Years	Team	Caps	Goals
2022–present	England	2	(0)
2020–present	Great Britain	4	(0)
–	ENGLAND & GB TOTAL:	6	(0)
Medal record
Women's field hockey
Representing England
Commonwealth Games
Gold medal – first place	2022 Birmingham	Team
- Updated on 21 February 2022

Sophie Hamilton (born 28 February 2001) is an English field hockey player who plays as a midfielder for Surbiton and the England and Great Britain national teams.

== Club career ==
Hamilton plays club hockey in the Women's England Hockey League Premier Division for Surbiton.

She joined them after playing in the USA for UConn Huskies in 2019 and 2020. Hamilton has also played for Clifton Robinsons and Team Bath Buccaneers.

== Personal life ==
She has a twin sister, Liv, who plays with her on the national team.
