= Hannah McLoughlin =

Irish field hockey player

Personal information
- Nationality: Ireland
- Born: 2 December 1999 (age 26)
- Height: 1.76 m (5 ft 9 in)

Sport
- Sport: Field hockey

Hannah McLoughlin (born 2 December 1999) is an Irish field hockey player. She competed in the 2020 Summer Olympics.
