= Charlotte Beggs =

Irish field hockey player

Personal information
- Full name: Charlotte Victoria Beggs
- Born: 16 September 2002 (age 23) Derry, Northern Ireland

Sport
- Sport: Field hockey
- Position: Midfield
National team
Years	Team	Caps	Goals
2022–	Ireland	45	(0)
Medal record
Women's field hockey
Representing Ireland
FIH Nations Cup
Silver medal – second place	2023–24 Terrassa
Silver medal – second place	2024–25 Santiago

Charlotte Victoria Beggs (born 16 September 2002) is a field hockey player from Ireland.

== Personal life ==
Charlotte Beggs was born and raised in Derry, Northern Ireland.

She is an alum of Rainey Endowed School and Ulster University.

== Career ==
=== Under–21 ===
In 2022, Beggs was named in the Ireland U–21 squad for the FIH Junior World Cup in Potchefstroom. She was later ruled out of competing due to injury.

=== Green Army ===
Beggs received her first call-up to the Green Army in 2022. She was named in the squad for the FIH World Cup held in Terrassa and Amsterdam. She made her senior international debut at the tournament, earning her first cap in Ireland's opening match against the Netherlands.

Since her debut, Beggs has been a constant inclusion in the senior national squad. During her career she has won two silver medals with the side, at the 2023–24 and 2024–25 editions of the FIH Nations Cup in Terrassa and Santiago, respectively.

Major International Tournaments

- 2022 FIH World Cup – Terrassa and Amsterdam
- 2022 FIH Nations Cup – Valencia
- 2023 EuroHockey Championship – Mönchengladbach
- 2024 FIH Olympic Qualifiers – Valencia
- 2023–24 FIH Nations Cup – Terrassa
- 2025 EuroHockey Championship – Mönchengladbach
- 2024–25 FIH Nations Cup – Santiago
