= Lily Owsley =

English field hockey player

Lily Owsley MBE
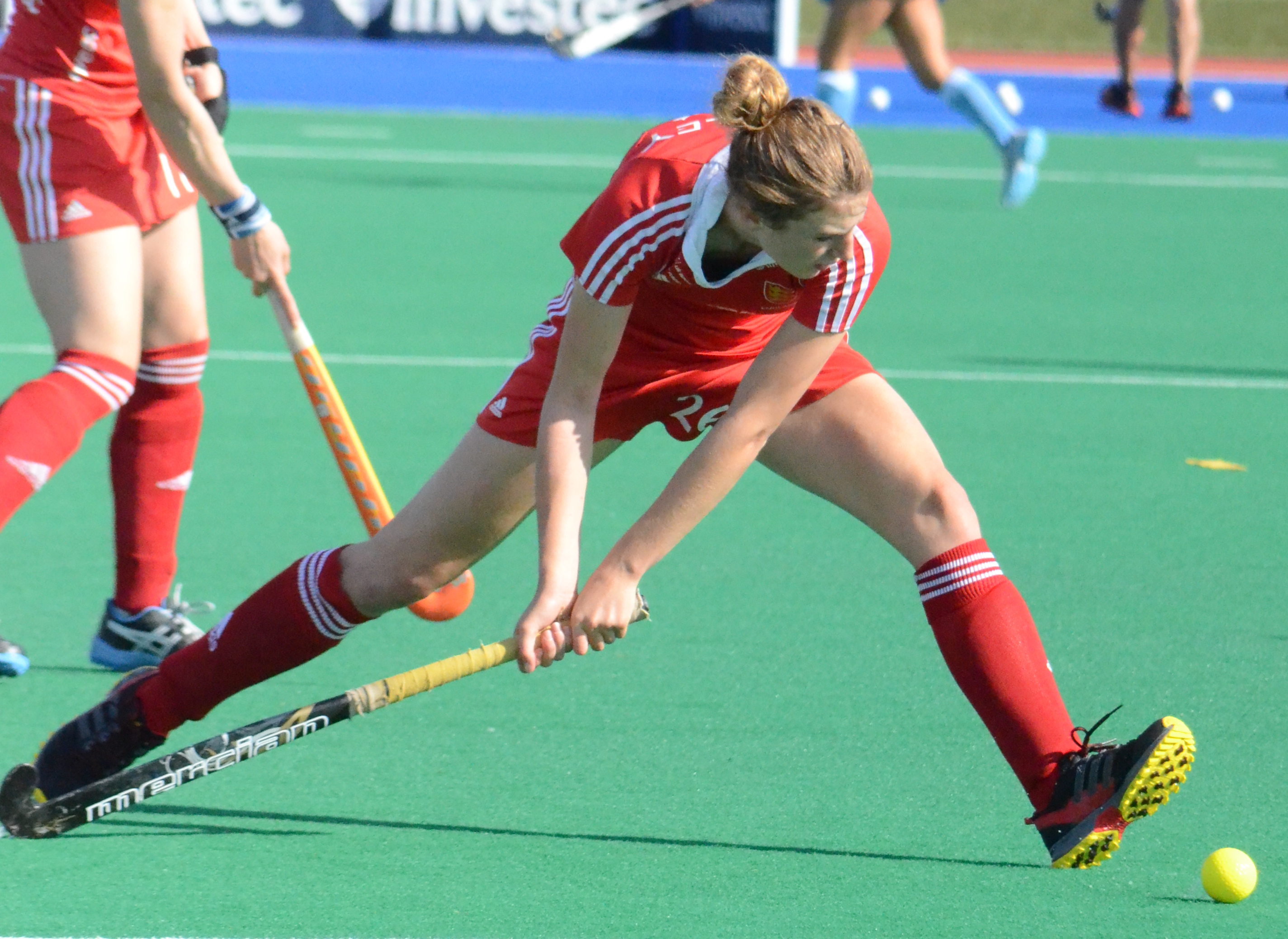
- Owsley in 2013

Personal information
- Full name: Lily Isabelle Owsley
- Born: 10 December 1994 (age 31) Bristol, England
- Height: 1.70 m (5 ft 7 in)
- Weight: 70 kg (154 lb)

Sport
- Sport: Field hockey
- Position: Midfield or Forward
- Club: Buenos Aires
National team
Years	Team	Caps	Goals
2013–present	England	88	(19)
2014–present	Great Britain	76	(17)
–	ENGLAND & GB TOTAL:	250	(36)
Medal record
Women's field hockey
Representing Great Britain
Olympic Games
Gold medal – first place	2016 Rio de Janeiro	Team
Bronze medal – third place	2020 Tokyo	Team
Representing England
European Championship
Gold medal – first place	2015 London
Bronze medal – third place	2017 Amstelveen
Commonwealth Games
Gold medal – first place	2022 Birmingham	Team
Silver medal – second place	2014 Glasgow	Team
- Updated on 8 August 2022

Lily Isabelle Owsley (born 10 December 1994) in Bristol, England is an English field hockey player who plays as a midfielder or forward for Argentine club Club Atlético Banco de la Provincia de Buenos Aires and the England and Great Britain national teams. She´s also a big argentine football fan, allegedly a Club Atlético Platense fan

== Club career ==
Owsley plays club hockey in the Dutch Hoofdklasse for hdm. She has been playing hockey in the Women's England Hockey League Premier Division for Hampstead & Westminster. and has also played for University of Birmingham

== International career ==
She won gold competing for Great Britain at the 2016 Rio Olympics, where she scored GB's first goal of the tournament as well as the first goal in the Gold Medal final. She competed for England in the women's hockey tournament at the 2014 Commonwealth Games where she won a silver medal. She was selected for the 2018 Commonwealth Team but had to withdraw due to injury.

Owsley won Euro hockey gold with England in August 2015 at the Queen Elizabeth Olympic Park in Stratford, London. She scored the final goal to end full-time 2–2 with the Netherlands, then England won the penalty shoot out.

In January 2016, Owsley was named global FIH Rising Star of 2015.

In June 2021, it was announced that Owsley would be partaking in her second Olympic Games at Tokyo 2020, representing Great Britain in the Women's field hockey team.

At the end of the 2024 season, Owsley joined Banco Provincia in Argentina.

== Education ==
Lily was educated at Clifton College, The University of Birmingham and King's College London.
