= Katie Curtis (field hockey) =

German field hockey player (born 2003)

Personal information
- Full name: Katharine Curtis
- Born: 30 April 2002 (age 24) Cambridge, England

Sport
- Sport: Field hockey
- Position: Midfield
- Club: Teddington
National team
Years	Team	Caps	Goals
2022–2023	England U–21	19	(0)
2024–	England	3	(0)
Medal record
Women's field hockey
Representing England
FIH Junior World Cup
Bronze medal – third place	2022 Potchefstroom	Team

Katharine 'Katie' Curtis (born 30 April 2002) is a field hockey player from England.

== Personal life ==
Katie Curtis was born and raised in Cambridge, England.

== England ==
=== Under–21 ===
In 2021, Curtis was named in the England U–21 squad for the FIH Junior World Cup in Potchefstroom. Due to the COVID-19 pandemic, the competition was later postponed resulting in squad changes, however Curtis retained her place in the side. At the delayed event, she helped the team to England's first ever bronze medal. Later that year she represented the team again at the EuroHockey U–21 Championship in Ghent.

In 2023, Curtis represented the English U–21 side again. She featured in the fourth-place finish at the FIH Junior World Cup in Santiago.

=== Senior national squad ===
Curtis received her maiden call up to the senior national squad in 2023. She was included in the English squad for a tour of Spain, where she made her debut in a match against India during a Four–Nations Tournament in Terrassa.

In 2025, she travelled with the national team to India for their second away leg of the 2024–25 FIH Pro League.

== Great Britain ==
Alongside nine other players, Curtis was officially raised to the Great Britain Hockey senior training programme in 2024.
