= Fiona Burnet =

Scottish field hockey player

Personal information
- Full name: Fiona Alexandra Burnet
- Born: 10 October 1996 (age 29) Alexandria, West Dunbartonshire, Scotland
- Height: 172 cm (5 ft 8 in)

Sport
- Sport: Field hockey
- Position: Forward
National team
Years	Team	Caps	Goals
2014–	Scotland	76	(13)
Medal record
Women's field hockey
Representing Scotland
EuroHockey Championship II
Gold medal – first place	2019 Glasgow	Team

Fiona Alexandra Burnet (born 10 October 1996) is a field hockey player from Scotland, who plays as a forward.

== Personal life ==
Fiona Burnet was born in Alexandria and raised in Helensburgh, Scotland.

Burnet is also a member of the eco-athletes group.

== Career ==
=== Under–21 ===
Jennifer Eadie made her debut for the Scotland U–21 team in 2014 at the EuroHockey Junior Championship II in Vienna.

=== Senior team ===
Fiona Burnet also made her senior international debut for Scotland in 2014, during a test series against Germany.

In 2022, Burnet was named in the national squad for the XXII Commonwealth Games in Birmingham.
