= Tess Howard =

English field hockey player

Tess Howard MBE OLY
Personal information
- Full name: Tessa Gillian Howard
- Born: 6 January 1999 (age 27) Cambridge, England

Sport
- Sport: Field hockey
- Position: Midfielder
- Club: East Grinstead
National team
| Years | Team | Caps | Goals |
| 2019–present | England | 4 | (0) |
| 2018–present | Great Britain | 33 | (7) |
| – | ENGLAND & GB TOTAL: | 37 | (7) |
Medal record
Women's field hockey
Representing England
Commonwealth Games
| Gold medal – first place | 2022 Birmingham |
- Updated on 21 November 2025

Tessa Gillian Howard MBE OLY (born 6 January 1999) is an English field hockey player who plays as a midfielder for East Grinstead and the England and Great Britain national teams.

== Club career ==
Howard plays club hockey in the Women's England Hockey League Premier Division for East Grinstead.

Howard has also played for Durham University and Cambridge City.

== Personal life ==
Howard has been heavily involved in the Inclusive Sportswear Charter, which advocates for changes in kit policies at clubs and schools to make women and girls feel more comfortable and welcome in sport, and to "ensure choice and comfort comes first at all levels of sport."

Howard was appointed a Member of the Order of the British Empire (MBE) in the 2025 New Year Honours for services to inclusive sportswear for women and girls.
