= Hockey at the 2022 Commonwealth Games – Women's tournament =

Women's hockey at the 2022 Commonwealth Games
Tournament details
- Host country: England
- City: Birmingham
- Dates: 29 July – 7 August 2022
- Teams: 10 (from 5 confederations)
- Venue: University of Birmingham Hockey and Squash Centre

Final positions
- Champions: England (1st title)
- Runner-up: Australia
- Third place: India

Tournament statistics
- Matches played: 27
- Goals scored: 139 (5.15 per match)
- Top scorer(s): (England) Grace Balsdon (South Africa) Jean-Leigh du Toit (6 goals)

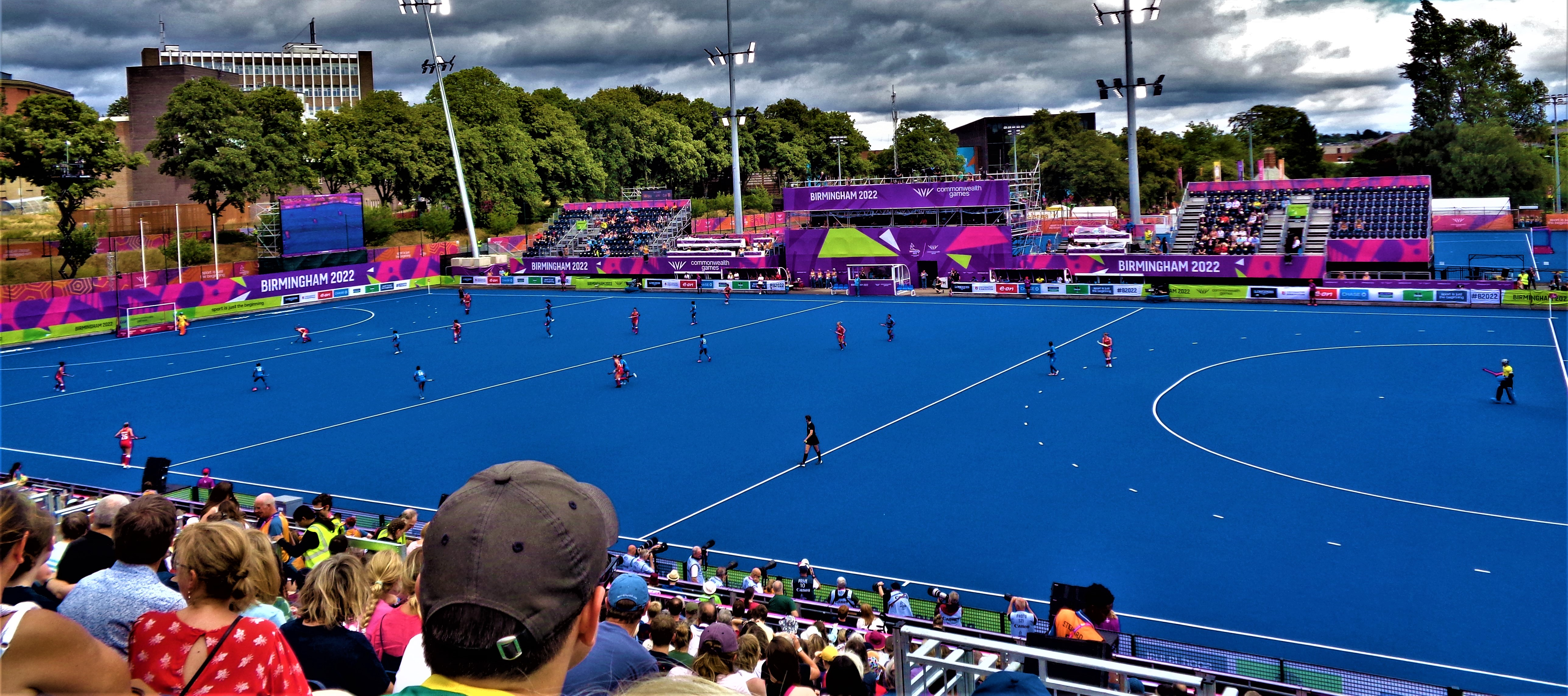
India vs England (Pool A - Group stage)

The women's field hockey tournament at the 2022 Commonwealth Games was held at the University of Birmingham Hockey and Squash Centre between 29 July and 7 August 2022.

== Qualification ==
England qualified as host nation, New Zealand qualified as defending champions, and the 8 other teams qualified by FIH Women's World Ranking.

Means of qualification	Date	Location	Quotas	Qualified
Host Nation	—N/a	—N/a	1	England
2018 Commonwealth Games	5–14 April 2018	(Australia) Gold Coast	1	New Zealand
FIH World Rankings	1 February 2022	—N/a	8	Australia; India; Canada; South Africa; Scotland; ~~Malaysia~~ (Note: The Malaysian Hockey Confederation withdrew from the Commonwealth Games in order to optimise preparation for the 2022 Asian Games, where the winning team will qualify for the 2024 Summer Olympics. At the time, the Asian Games were scheduled to take place in September 2022.); Wales; Ghana; Kenya
TOTAL			10	

Scheduling issues

== Competition format ==
In March 2022, ten teams were drawn into two groups of five; the top two performing teams in each group advance to the semi-finals, whilst the remaining teams are sent to lower classification matches to determine their final ranking.

== Umpires ==
- Rhiannon Murrie (AUS)
- Aleisha Neumann (AUS)
- Lelia Sacre (CAN)
- Hannah Harrison (ENG)
- Rachel Williams (ENG)
- Rebecca Woodcock (ENG)
- Amber Church (NZL)
- Katrina Turner (NZL)
- Binish Hayat (PAK)
- Wanri Venter (RSA)
- Cookie Tan (SGP)
- Cathy Wright (WAL)

== Group stage ==
=== Pool A ===
Pos	Team	Pld	W	D	L	GF	GA	GD	Pts	Qualification
1	England (H)	4	4	0	0	21	1	+20	12	Semi-finals
2	India	4	3	0	1	12	6	+6	9	Semi-finals
3	Canada	4	2	0	2	14	5	+9	6	Fifth place match
4	Wales	4	1	0	3	5	12	−7	3	Seventh place match
5	Ghana	4	0	0	4	1	29	−28	0	Ninth place match

Source: Birmingham 2022
Rules for classification: 1) points; 2) number of wins; 3) goal difference; 4) goals scored; 5) head-to-head results.
(H) Hosts

29 July 2022
14:00

India	5–0	Ghana
Gurjit 3', 34'; Neha 28'; Sangita 36'; Salima 56'	Report

Umpires:
Wanri Venter (RSA)
Katrina Turner (NZL)

29 July 2022
16:00

Canada	4–0	Wales
Haughn 21'; Stairs 33', 50'; McManus 45'	Report

Umpires:
Amber Church (NZL)
Binish Hayat (PAK)

30 July 2022
16:00

England	12–0	Ghana
Balsdon 10', 19', 47'; Martin 15', 34', 48'; Ansley 27'; Hunt 28'; Howard 33'; Owsley 38'; Toman 48'; Unsworth 54'	Report

Umpires:
Wanri Venter (RSA)
Rhiannon Murrie (AUS)

30 July 2022
19:00

India	3–1	Wales
Vandana 26', 48'; Gurjit 28'	Report	Hughes 45'

Umpires:
Cookie Tan (SGP)
Lelia Sacre (CAN)

31 July 2022
19:00

Canada	0–1	England
	Report	Toman 20'

Umpires:
Cookie Tan (SGP)
Aleisha Neumann (AUS)

1 August 2022
09:00

Wales	4–0	Ghana
Wilkinson 40'; Webb 50'; Holme 52'; Bingham 58'	Report

Umpires:
Binish Hayat (PAK)
Rebecca Woodcock (ENG)

2 August 2022
11:00

Ghana	1–8	Canada
Berko 51'	Report	Walton 7'; Delmotte 13', 47'; Thompson 14'; McManus 17', 17'; Stairs 49'; Secco 59'

Umpires:
Aleisha Neumann (AUS)
Rhiannon Murrie (AUS)

2 August 2022
14:00

India	1–3	England
Vandana 60'	Report	Ansley 3'; Howard 40'; Martin 52'

Umpires:
Wanri Venter (RSA)
Cookie Tan (SGP)

3 August 2022
11:00

Canada	2–3	India
Stairs 23'; Haughn 39'	Report	Salima 3'; Navneet 22'; Lalremsiami 51'

Umpires:
Katrina Turner (NZL)
Hannah Harrison (ENG)

4 August 2022
11:00

England	5–0	Wales
Balsdon 18', 34', 58'; Martin 28'; Ansley 54'	Report

Umpires:
Wanri Venter (RSA)
Binish Hayat (PAK)

=== Pool B ===
Pos	Team	Pld	W	D	L	GF	GA	GD	Pts	Qualification
1	Australia	4	4	0	0	16	0	+16	12	Semi-finals
2	New Zealand	4	3	0	1	21	2	+19	9	Semi-finals
3	Scotland	4	2	0	2	15	5	+10	6	Fifth place match
4	South Africa	4	1	0	3	18	13	+5	3	Seventh place match
5	Kenya	4	0	0	4	0	50	−50	0	Ninth place match

Source: Birmingham 2022
Rules for classification: 1) points; 2) number of wins; 3) goal difference; 4) goals scored; 5) head-to-head results.

29 July 2022
09:00

New Zealand	16–0	Kenya
Jaques 8', 30+'; Dickins 12', 28'; Shannon 13', 29', 45+'; Hull 18', 30'; Lukin 25'; Davies 37'; Tynan 43'; Cotter 46', 50'; Merry 53', 56'	Report

Umpires:
Rachel Williams (ENG)
Lelia Sacre (CAN)

29 July 2022
11:00

South Africa	2–4	Scotland
Deetlefs 8', 12'	Report	Watson 7'; S. Robertson 19'; Burnet 32'; Eadie 53'

Umpires:
Hannah Harrison (ENG)
Cathy Wright (WAL)

30 July 2022
14:00

Australia	8–0	Kenya
Nobbs 5', 12', 60'; Tonkin 5', 32'; Kershaw 15'; Colwill 25'; Stewart 36'	Report

Umpires:
Cathy Wright (WAL)
Katrina Turner (NZL)

30 July 2022
21:00

New Zealand	1–0	Scotland
Tynan 9'	Report

Umpires:
Aleisha Neumann (AUS)
Rebecca Woodcock (ENG)

31 July 2022
21:00

South Africa	0–5	Australia
	Report	Squibb 3', 48'; Taylor 32'; Kershaw 36'; Nobbs 46'

Umpires:
Rachel Williams (ENG)
Amber Church(NZL)

1 August 2022
11:00

Scotland	11–0	Kenya
Burnet 3', 45'; Watson 6', 27'; Eadie 7'; Jamieson 11', 42'; Campbell 13'; Costello 15+'; Shields 48'; K. Robertson 56'	Report

Umpires:
Hannah Harrison (ENG)
Rhiannon Murrie (AUS)

2 August 2022
09:00

New Zealand	0–1	Australia
	Report	Nobbs 9'

Umpires:
Rachel Williams (ENG)
Lelia Sacre (CAN)

2 August 2022
16:00

Kenya	0–15	South Africa
	Report	Du Toit 4', 27', 43', 46', 57'; Lombard 11', 56'; Du Plessis 12', 40', 51', 53'; Hunter 14', 27'; Paton 35'; Coston 60'

Umpires:
Rebecca Woodcock (ENG)
Binish Hayat (PAK)

3 August 2022
09:00

Australia	2–0	Scotland
Stewart 28'; Tonkin 47'	Report

Umpires:
Cathy Wright (WAL)
Amber Church (NZL)

4 August 2022
09:00

South Africa	1–4	New Zealand
Du Toit 50'	Report	Jopp 10'; Lench 11'; Ralph 12'; Cotter 49'

Umpires:
Rebecca Woodcock (ENG)
Lelia Sacre (CAN)

== Classification matches ==
=== Ninth place match ===
5 August 2022
09:00

Ghana	2–2	Kenya
Umaru 26'; Berko 32'	Report	Bwire 5'; Mutiva 58'
Penalties
Umaru (penalty shoot-out scored); Opoku (penalty shoot-out missed); Berko (penalty shoot-out scored); Copson (penalty shoot-out missed); Narkuor (penalty shoot-out missed); Umaru (penalty shoot-out missed)	2–3	(penalty shoot-out missed) Okumu; (penalty shoot-out scored) Chebet; (penalty shoot-out missed) Okumu; (penalty shoot-out scored) Guchu; (penalty shoot-out missed) Owiti; (penalty shoot-out scored) Chebet

Umpires:
Rhiannon Murrie (AUS)
Rebecca Woodcock (ENG)

=== Seventh place match ===
5 August 2022
11:15

Wales	0–1	South Africa
	Report	Du Plessis 38'

Umpires:
Lelia Sacre (CAN)
Cookie Tan (SGP)

=== Fifth place match ===
7 August 2022
11:15

Canada	3–1	Scotland
Haughn 4', 17'; Johansen 41'	Report	Costello 15'

Umpires:
Katrina Turner (NZL)
Hannah Harrison (ENG)

== Medal round ==
=== Bracket ===
Semi-finals
5 August
England (p.)	0 (2)
New Zealand	0 (0)
5 August
Australia (p.)	1 (3)
India	1 (0)

Gold medal match
7 August
England	2
Australia	1
Bronze medal match
7 August
New Zealand	1 (1)
India (p.)	1 (2)

=== Semi-finals ===
5 August 2022
18:00

England	0–0	New Zealand
	Report
Penalties
Howard (penalty shoot-out missed); Owsley (penalty shoot-out missed); Petter (penalty shoot-out scored); Martin (penalty shoot-out scored)	2–0	(penalty shoot-out missed) Ralph; (penalty shoot-out missed) Tynan; (penalty shoot-out missed) Doar; (penalty shoot-out missed) Shannon

Umpires:
Aleisha Neumann (AUS)
Wanri Venter (RSA)

5 August 2022
20:15

Australia	1–1	India
Greiner 10'	Report	Vandana 49'
Penalties
Malone (penalty shoot-out scored); Nobbs (penalty shoot-out scored); Lawton (penalty shoot-out scored)	3–0	(penalty shoot-out missed) Lalremsiami; (penalty shoot-out missed) Neha; (penalty shoot-out missed) Navneet

Umpires:
Amber Church (NZL)
Hannah Harrison (ENG)

=== Bronze medal match ===
7 August 2022
09:00

New Zealand	1–1	India
Merry 60'	Report	Salima 29'
Penalties
Hull (penalty shoot-out scored); Ralph (penalty shoot-out missed); Tynan (penalty shoot-out missed); Doar (penalty shoot-out missed); Shannon (penalty shoot-out missed)	1–2	(penalty shoot-out missed) Sangita; (penalty shoot-out scored) Sonika; (penalty shoot-out scored) Navneet; (penalty shoot-out missed) Neha

Umpires:
Rachel Williams (ENG)
Aleisha Neumann (AUS)

=== Gold medal match ===
7 August 2022
15:00

England	2–1	Australia
Hunt 22'; Howard 26'	Report	Malone 60'

Umpires:
Amber Church (NZL)
Wanri Venter (RSA)

== Final position ==
As per statistical convention in field hockey, matches decided in extra time are counted as wins and losses, while matches decided by penalty shoot-outs are counted as draws.

Pos	Team	Pld	W	D	L	GF	GA	GD	Pts	Final result
1st place, gold medalist(s)	England (H)	6	5	1	0	23	2	+21	16	Gold Medal
2nd place, silver medalist(s)	Australia	6	4	1	1	18	3	+15	13	Silver Medal
3rd place, bronze medalist(s)	India	6	3	2	1	14	8	+6	11	Bronze Medal
4	New Zealand	6	3	2	1	22	3	+19	11	
5	Canada	5	3	0	2	17	6	+11	9	
6	Scotland	5	2	0	3	16	8	+8	6	
7	South Africa	5	2	0	3	19	13	+6	6	
8	Wales	5	1	0	4	5	13	−8	3	
9	Kenya	5	0	1	4	2	52	−50	1	
10	Ghana	5	0	1	4	3	31	−28	1	

Source: FIH
(H) Hosts

== Goalscorers ==
There were 139 goals scored in 27 matches, for an average of 5.15 goals per match.

6 goals

- (England) Grace Balsdon
- (South Africa) Jean-Leigh du Toit

5 goals

- (Australia) Kaitlin Nobbs
- (England) Hannah Martin
- (South Africa) Lilian du Plessis

4 goals

- (Canada) Hannah Haughn
- (Canada) Brienne Stairs
- (India) Vandana Katariya

3 goals

- (Australia) Shanea Tonkin
- (Canada) Sara McManus
- (England) Giselle Ansley
- (England) Tessa Howard
- (India) Gurjit Kaur
- (India) Salima Tete
- (New Zealand) Kaitlin Cotter
- (New Zealand) Olivia Merry
- (New Zealand) Olivia Shannon
- (Scotland) Fiona Burnet
- (Scotland) Charlotte Watson
- (South Africa) Tarryn Lombard

2 goals

- (Australia) Stephanie Kershaw
- (Australia) Penny Squibb
- (Australia) Grace Stewart
- (Canada) Grace Delmotte
- (England) Holly Hunt
- (England) Anna Toman
- (Ghana) Mavis Berko
- (New Zealand) Stephanie Dickins
- (New Zealand) Megan Hull
- (New Zealand) Alia Jaques
- (New Zealand) Rose Tynan
- (Scotland) Amy Costello
- (Scotland) Jennifer Eadie
- (Scotland) Sarah Jamieson
- (South Africa) Lisa-Marié Deetlefs

1 goal

- (Australia) Claire Colwill
- (Australia) Rebecca Greiner
- (Australia) Ambrosia Malone
- (Australia) Renee Taylor
- (Canada) Karli Johansen
- (Canada) Madeline Secco
- (Canada) Madison Thompson
- (Canada) Chloe Walton
- (England) Lily Owsley
- (England) Laura Unsworth
- (Ghana) Nafisatu Umaru
- (India) Neha Goyal
- (India) Navneet Kaur
- (India) Sangita Kumari
- (India) Lalremsiami
- (Kenya) Grace Bwire
- (Kenya) Flavia Mutiva
- (New Zealand) Frances Davies
- (New Zealand) Tessa Jopp
- (New Zealand) Tyler Lench
- (New Zealand) Alexandra Lukin
- (New Zealand) Hope Ralph
- (Scotland) Louise Campbell
- (Scotland) Katie Robertson
- (Scotland) Sarah Robertson
- (Scotland) Bronwyn Shields
- (South Africa) Erin Christie
- (South Africa) Bernadette Coston
- (South Africa) Kristen Paton
- (Wales) Elisabeth Bingham
- (Wales) Millie Holme
- (Wales) Xenna Hughes
- (Wales) Isobel Webb
- (Wales) Leah Wilkinson

Source: FIH
