= Great Britain women's national field hockey team =

Great Britain
- Association: GB Hockey
- Confederation: EHF (Europe)
- Head Coach: David Ralph
- Assistant coach(es): Katie Glynn
- Manager: Samantha Beveridge
- Captain: Hollie Pearne-Webb
Home	Away

Olympic Games
- Appearances: 9 (first in 1988)
- Best result: 1st (2016)

The Great Britain women's national field hockey team represents the United Kingdom in international field hockey tournaments such as the Summer Olympics and the Pro League.

In most other competitions, including the Women's Hockey World Cup, the Commonwealth Games and some editions of the Hockey Champions Trophy, three of the home nations compete in their own right: England and Scotland and Wales, while Northern Ireland is represented as part of the all-Ireland team.

The team has won gold once and bronze on three occasions at the Summer Olympics, and silver once in the Champions Trophy.

== Tournament history ==
=== Summer Olympics ===
- 1988 – 4th place
- 1992 – (bronze)
- 1996 – 4th place
- 2000 – 8th place
- 2008 – 6th place
- 2012 – (bronze)
- 2016 – (gold)
- 2020 – (bronze)
- 2024 – 8th place

=== World League ===
- 2014–15 – 7th place

=== Pro League ===
- 2019 – 8th place
- 2020–21 – (bronze)
- 2022–23 – 6th place
- 2023–24 – 7th place
- 2026-27 – TBD

=== Champions Trophy ===
- 1987 – 5th place
- 1989 – 4th place
- 1993 – 6th place
- 1997 – 5th place
- 2012 – (silver)
- 2016 – 5th place
- 2018 – 5th place

== Players ==
=== Current squad ===
Roster for the 2024 Summer Olympics. The squad was announced on 18 June 2024.

Head coach: (Scotland) David Ralph

No.	Pos.	Player	Date of birth (age)	Caps	Goals	Club
4	MF	Laura Roper	8 March 1988 (aged 36)	350	22	(England) East Grinstead
6	DF	Anna Toman	29 April 1993 (aged 31)	139	14	(England) Wimbledon
7	FW	Hannah French	30 December 1994 (aged 29)	144	55	(England) Surbiton
8	FW	Sarah Jones	25 June 1990 (aged 34)	178	30	(England) Wimbledon
9	DF	Amy Costello	14 January 1998 (aged 26)	134	19	(England) Surbiton
10	FW	Sarah Robertson	27 September 1993 (aged 30)	207	26	(England) Hampstead & Westminster
12	FW	Charlotte Watson	23 April 1998 (aged 26)	115	33	(England) Loughborough Students
14	FW	Tessa Howard	6 January 1999 (aged 25)	91	35	(England) East Grinstead
16	MF	Isabelle Petter	27 June 2000 (aged 24)	105	15	(England) Surbiton
18	DF	Giselle Ansley	31 March 1992 (aged 32)	221	59	(England) Surbiton
20	DF	Hollie Pearne-Webb (Captain)	19 September 1990 (aged 33)	264	20	(England) Wimbledon
21	MF	Fiona Crackles	11 February 2000 (aged 24)	87	3	(England) Wimbledon
23	MF	Sophie Hamilton	28 February 2001 (aged 23)	71	7	(England) Surbiton
26	MF	Lily Owsley	10 December 1994 (aged 29)	235	79	(England) Hampstead & Westminster
28	MF	Flora Peel	19 September 1996 (aged 27)	56	1	(England) Wimbledon
40	GK	Miriam Pritchard	21 December 1998 (aged 25)	13	0	(England) Holcombe

== See also ==
- Great Britain men's national field hockey team
- England women's national hockey team
- Ireland women's national field hockey team
- Scotland women's national field hockey team
- Wales women's national field hockey team
