= 2025–26 Women's England Hockey League season =

English field hockey season

Women's England Hockey League

The 2025–26 Women's England Hockey League season is the 2025–26 season of England's field hockey league structure for women. The regular league season starts on 20 September 2025 and ends on 28 March 2026. Reading are the defending league champions, having won the league in 2024–25.

The England Hockey Women's Championship Cup which included Premier division teams was discontinued in favour of a lower tier events.

== Summary ==
There would be no place for the most successful women's club of all time, Slough, in the top three divisions following their relegation to the conference leagues. After several years of competing at the top of division 1 south and north respectively, Barnes and Durham University were in to the Premier Division following their promotions the previous season. There were now four University teams in the Premier division.

The four teams promoted to Division 1 from the conference divisions were the second XI teams from Reading and Loughborough Students, in addition to Leeds and Teddington.

Surbiton won the Premier league title after defeating Wimbledon 4–2 in the Premier finals.

== Format ==
- Phase 1 - 11 matches per club determining the top six and bottom six clubs for phase 2.
- Phase 2 - 5 additional matches per club determining the top eight and bottom four clubs for phase 3.
- Phase 3 - 3 additional matches per club determining the top four to progress to league finals weekend and the bottom two to be relegated.

== 2025–2026 teams ==
=== Premier Division ===
Team	City/town	Home pitch
Barnes	Chiswick	Duke's Meadow, Dan Mason Drive
Bowdon Hightown	Bowdon	The Bowdon Club
Clifton Robinsons	Westbury-on-Trym	Coombe Dingle Sports Centre
Durham University	Durham	The Graham Sports Centre
East Grinstead	East Grinstead	East Grinstead Sports Club
Hampstead & Westminster	Paddington	Paddington Recreation Ground
Loughborough Students 1st XI	Loughborough	Loughborough University
Reading 1st XI	Reading	Sonning Lane
Surbiton 1st XI	Long Ditton	Sugden Road
University of Birmingham	Birmingham	Bournbrook Astroturf pitches
University of Nottingham	Nottingham	David Ross Sports Village, Nottingham HC
Wimbledon	Wimbledon	Raynes Park High School, King's College School

=== Division One South ===
Team	City/town	Home pitch
Firebrands	Bristol	QEH Sports Ground, Failand
Guildford	Godalming	Broadwater School
Harleston Magpies	Harleston	Shotford Heath
Holcombe	Rochester	Holcombe Park
Reading 2nd XI	Reading	Sonning Lane
Sevenoaks	Sevenoaks	Vine Cricket Ground
Southgate	Oakwood	Southgate Hockey Centre
Surbiton 2nd XI	Long Ditton	Sugden Road
Teddington	Teddington	Teddington School
Isca & University of Exeter	Exeter	University of Exeter Sports Park

=== Division One North ===
Team	City/town	Home pitch
Beeston	Beeston	Nottingham HC
Ben Rhydding	Ben Rhydding	Coutances Way
Buckingham	Buckingham	Stowe School
Gloucester City	Gloucester	Plock Court and St Peter's High School
Leeds	Leeds	Sports Park Weetwood
Loughborough Students 2nd XI	Loughborough	Loughborough University
Olton & West Warwicks	Solihull	West Warwickshire Sports Complex
Pendle Forest	Nelson	Pendle Vale College
Repton	Repton, Derby	Repton School
Sutton Coldfield	Sutton Coldfield	Rectory Park

== League Tables ==
=== Premier Division ===
Pos	Team	P	W	D	L	Pts	Section
1	Surbiton	16	14	2	0	44	top 6-top 8
2	Hampstead & Westminster	16	11	2	3	35	top 6-top 8
3	East Grinstead	16	9	2	5	29	top 6-top 8
4	Wimbledon	16	8	4	4	28	top 6-top 8
5	Reading	16	6	4	6	22	top 6-top 8
6	Durham University	16	6	0	4	18	top 6-top 8
7	University of Birmingham	16	7	3	6	24	bottom 6-top 8
8	Loughborough Students	16	6	4	6	22	bottom 6-top 8
9	Bowdon	16	5	3	8	18	bottom 6 - bottom 4
10	University of Nottingham	16	4	3	9	15	bottom 6 - bottom 4
11	Clifton Robinsons	16	4	2	10	14	bottom 6 - bottom 4
12	Barnes	16	1	1	14	4	bottom 6 - bottom 4

==== Top 8 - Phase 3 ====
Pool A
Pos	Team	Pts
1	Surbiton	9
2	Wimbledon	6
3	Loughborough Students	3
4	Reading	0

Pool B
Pos	Team	Pts
1	Hampstead & Westminster	9
2	Durham University	5
3	University of Birmingham	4
4	East Grinstead	0

==== Finals weekend ====
All matches were played at the Nottingham Hockey Centre in Nottingham.

Semi-finals
2 May
Hampstead & Westminster	0
Wimbledon	2
2 May
Surbiton	3
Durham University	0

Final
3 May
Surbiton	4
Wimbledon	2
Third place
3 May
Hampstead & Westminster	1
Durham University	0

Semi-finals

2 May 2026

Surbiton	3–0	Durham University

2 May 2026

Wimbledon	2–0	Hampstead & Westminster

Third and fourth place

3 May 2025

Hampstead & Westminster	1–0	Durham University
Hyams

Final

3 May 2025

Surbiton	4–2	Wimbledon
Mackenzie, Taylor, Hamilton, Bourne		Gillott, Bingham

==== Finals squads ====
Durham University
- 7. Lizzy Pocknell (captain)
- 9. Elizabeth Gibbins
- 10. Scarlett Spavin
- 11. Katie Birch
- 12. Ava Wadsworth
- 13. Katie Rimmer
- 14. Emmie Gilbert
- 18. Laura Cottee
- 19. Amelie Hales
- 21. Helena Youmans
- 22. Lorna Crawford
- 28. Evelyn Wilson
- 34. Ava Findlay
- 36. Darcy Littlefield
- 43. Rebecca Birch
- 44. Ffion Horrell (goalkeeper)
Hampstead & Westminster
- 3. Rachel Greenwood
- 5. Olivia Hamilton
- 8. Phoebe Willars
- 10. Tyler Lench
- 11. Jane Kilpatrick
- 14. Sofia Martin
- 15. Catherine De Ledesma
- 16. Philippa Lewis
- 19. Emily Rowlands
- 22. Joie Leigh
- 24. Holly Hunt
- 25. Lucy Hyams
- 29. Esme Burge (captain)
- 48. Drew Victoria (goalkeeper)
- 29. Caoimhe Byrne
- 67. Gabriella Giles
Surbiton
- 1. Ayeisha McFerran (goalkeeper)
- 2. Giselle Ansley
- 5. Darcy Bourne
- 8. Erica Sanders (captain)
- 10. Georgie Gardens
- 12. Sophie Hamilton
- 13. Eloise Stenner
- 14. Madeleine Axford
- 15. Martha Taylor
- 17. Ellie Mackenzie
- 19. Katie Curtis
- 20. Amy Costello
- 21. Isabelle Yonge
- 23. Alice Sharp
- 24. Josefina Hippe
- 26. Ella Burnley
Wimbledon
- 5. Pippa Lock
- 6. Anna Toman (captain)
- 8. Olivia Chilton
- 9. Sarah Jones
- 10. Becky Manton
- 12. Charlotte Watson
- 13. Flora Fletcher
- 14. Emily Drysdale
- 15. Beth Bingham
- 17. Lydia Macdonell
- 20. Sarah Robertson
- 21. Fiona Crackles
- 23. Jessica Buchanan (goalkeeper)
- 24. Millie Holme
- 28. Flora Peel
- 30. Paige Gillott

=== Division One North ===
Pos	Team	P	W	L	D	Pts
1	Buckingham W1s	18	9	7	2	34
2	Gloucester City W1s	18	9	7	2	34
3	Loughborough Students W2s	18	8	4	6	28
4	Beeston W1s	18	8	2	8	26
5	Sutton Coldfield W1s	18	7	4	7	25
6	Ben Rhydding W1s	18	7	4	7	25
7	Pendle Forest W1s	18	6	6	6	24
8	Leeds W1s	18	6	3	9	21
9	Olton & West Warwicks W1s	18	6	2	10	20
10	Repton W1s	18	2	5	11	11

=== Division One South ===
Pos	Team	P	W	L	D	Pts
1	Teddington W1s	18	14	2	2	44
2	Isca & University of Exeter W1s	18	11	2	5	35
3	Holcombe W1s	18	10	3	5	33
4	Reading W2s	18	8	4	6	28
5	Bristol Firebrands W1s	18	8	4	6	28
6	Sevenoaks W1s	18	8	4	6	28
7	Surbiton W2s	18	8	3	7	27
8	Southgate W1s	18	5	5	8	20
9	Guildford W1s	18	4	1	13	13
10	Harleston Magpies W1s	18	0	0	18	0

=== Conference East ===
Pos	Team	P	W	D	L	Pts
1	Old Loughtonians W1s	18	12	2	4	38
2	Old Georgians W1s	18	12	2	4	38
3	Hampstead & Westminster W2s	18	10	2	6	32
4	Spencer W1s	18	9	4	5	31
5	London Wayfarers W1s	18	7	6	5	27
6	Canterbury W1s	18	6	4	8	22
7	Wimbledon W2s	18	5	4	9	19
8	Barnes W2s	18	5	4	9	19
9	Guildford W2s (R)	18	5	3	10	18
10	Wapping W1s (R)	18	0	7	11	7

=== Conference Midlands ===
Pos	Team	P	W	D	L	Pts
1	Leicester City W1s	18	12	4	2	40
2	University of Birmingham W2s	18	10	5	3	35
3	Oxford Hawks W1s	18	9	2	7	29
4	Nottingham Trent University W1s	18	8	4	6	28
5	Cambridge City W1s	18	8	3	7	27
6	St Albans W1s	18	7	6	5	27
7	Cambridge University W1s	18	7	3	8	24
8	Stourport W1s	18	6	4	8	22
9	Cannock W1s (R)	18	4	2	12	21
10	Harleston Magpies W2s (R)	18	0	0	18	0

=== Conference North ===
Pos	Team	P	W	D	L	Pts
1	Bowdon W2s	18	14	3	1	45
2	Alderley Edge W1s	18	13	3	2	42
3	Durham University W2s	18	12	1	5	37
4	Fylde W1s	18	11	3	4	36
5	Newcastle University W1s	18	9	1	8	28
6	Whitley Bay & Tynemouth Hockey W1s	18	8	2	8	26
7	Kirkby Stephen W1s	18	5	2	11	17
8	Didsbury Northern W1s	18	3	3	12	12
9	Sheffield W1s (R)	18	1	4	13	7
10	Wakefield W1s (R)	18	1	4	13	7

=== Conference West ===
Pos	Team	P	W	D	L	Pts
1	Team Bath Buccaneers W1s	18	12	4	2	40
2	Trojans W1s	18	12	1	5	37
3	Cardiff & Met W1s	18	11	4	3	37
4	Lansdown W1s	18	8	5	5	29
5	Oxford University W1s	18	7	6	5	27
6	Marlow W1s	18	5	5	8	20
7	Exeter W1s	18	5	2	11	17
8	Slough W1s	18	4	3	11	15
9	Clifton Robinsons W2s (R)	18	4	3	11	15
10	Cheltenham W1s (R)	18	4	3	11	15

== See also ==
2025–26 Men's England Hockey League season
