= 2024–25 Women's England Hockey League season =

English field hockey season

Women's England Hockey League
- Champions: Reading (league) tbc (cup)

The 2024–25 Women's England Hockey League season is the 2024–25 season of England's field hockey league structure and England Hockey Women's Championship Cup for women. The season started on 21 September 2024. Surbiton were the defending league champions and Beeston would defend the cup.

Reading won the league title but the England Hockey Women's Championship Cup was not completed for the first time in its history, due to a lack of organisation from England Hockey and the apparent lack of interest from clubs. The future of the cup was not known.

The most successful women's club of all time Slough were relegated to the conference leagues after a poor season.

== Format ==
- Phase 1 - 11 matches per club determining the top six and bottom six clubs for phase 2.
- Phase 2 - 5 additional matches per club determining the top eight and bottom four clubs for phase 3.
- Phase 3 - 3 additional matches per club determining the top four to progress to league finals weekend and the bottom two to be relegated.

== 2024–2025 teams ==
=== Premier Division ===
Team	City/town	Home pitch
Bowdon Hightown	Bowdon	The Bowdon Club
Clifton Robinsons	Westbury-on-Trym	Coombe Dingle Sports Centre
East Grinstead	East Grinstead	East Grinstead Sports Club
Hampstead & Westminster	Paddington	Paddington Recreation Ground
Holcombe	Rochester	Holcombe Park
Loughborough Students	Loughborough	Loughborough University
Reading	Reading	Sonning Lane
Surbiton	Long Ditton	Sugden Road
Sutton Coldfield	Sutton Coldfield	Rectory Park
University of Birmingham	Birmingham	Bournbrook
University of Nottingham	Nottingham	David Ross Sports Village, Nottingham HC
Wimbledon 1st XI	Wimbledon	Raynes Park High School, King's College School

=== Division One South ===
Team	City/town	Home pitch
Barnes	Chiswick	Duke's Meadow, Dan Mason Drive
Firebrands	Bristol	QEH Sports Ground, Failand
Guildford	Godalming	Broadwater School
Harleston Magpies	Harleston	Shotford Heath
Sevenoaks	Sevenoaks	Vine Cricket Ground
Slough	Slough	Upton Park, Upton Road
Southgate	Oakwood	Southgate Hockey Centre
Surbiton 2nd XI	Long Ditton	Sugden Road
Isca & University of Exeter	Exeter	University of Exeter Sports Park
Wimbledon 2nd XI	Wimbledon	Raynes Park HS, King's College School

=== Division One North ===
Team	City/town	Home pitch
Beeston	Beeston	Nottingham HC
Ben Rhydding	Ben Rhydding	Coutances Way
Buckingham	Buckingham	Stowe School
Durham University	Durham	The Graham Sports Centre
Gloucester City	Gloucester	Plock Court and St Peter's High School
Leicester City	Leicester	Leicester Grammar School
Olton & West Warwicks	Solihull	West Warwickshire Sports Complex
Pendle Forest	Nelson	Pendle Vale College
Repton	Repton, Derby	Repton School
Wakefield	Wakefield	College Grove Sports Ground

== Tables ==
=== Premier Division ===
Pos	Team	P	W	D	L	Pts	Section
1	Hampstead & Westminster	16	11	3	2	36	top 6-top 8
2	Surbiton	16	10	3	3	33	top 6-top 8
3	Reading	16	9	5	2	32	top 6-top 8
4	East Grinstead	16	9	4	3	31	top 6-top 8
5	Wimbledon	16	8	4	4	28	top 6-top 8
6	Loughborough Students	16	4	3	9	15	top 6-top 8
7	Clifton Robinsons	16	6	4	6	22	bottom 6-top 8
8	Bowdon	16	7	0	9	21	bottom 6-top 8
9	University of Birmingham	19	8	5	6	29	bottom 6 - bottom 4
10	University of Nottingham	19	6	5	8	23	bottom 6 - bottom 4
11	Holcombe (R)	19	4	3	12	15	bottom 6 - bottom 4
12	Sutton Coldfield (R)	19	0	1	18	1	bottom 6 - bottom 4

==== Top 8 - Phase 3 ====
Pool A
Pos	Team	Pts
1	Hampstead & Westminster	9
2	East Grinstead	6
3	Wimbledon	3
4	Bowdon	0

Pool B
Pos	Team	Pts
1	Surbiton	6
2	Reading	6
3	Loughborough Students	6
4	Clifton Robinsons	1

==== Finals weekend ====
All matches were played at the Nottingham Hockey Centre in Nottingham.

Semi-finals
3 May
Hampstead & Westminster	1 (0)
Reading (pen.)	1 (2)
3 May
Surbiton	3
East Grinstead	2

Final
4 May
Reading	1
Surbiton	0
Third place
4 May
Hampstead & Westminster	2
East Grinstead	3

Semi-finals

3 May 2025
15:30

Hampstead & Westminster	1–1	Reading
Willars 56'	Report	Spence 39'
Penalties
De Ledesma (penalty shoot-out missed); Hamilton (penalty shoot-out missed); Martin (penalty shoot-out missed); Lench (penalty shoot-out missed)	0–2	(penalty shoot-out missed) Findlay; (penalty shoot-out scored) Moore; (penalty shoot-out missed) Pinner; (penalty shoot-out scored) Dixon

Nottingham Hockey Centre, Nottingham
Umpires:
Hannah Harrison (ENG)
Clare White (ENG)

3 May 2025
17:15

Surbiton	3–2	East Grinstead
Bourne 3', 58'; Sanders 4'	Report	Mills 9', 50'

Nottingham Hockey Centre, Nottingham
Umpires:
Clare Barwood (WAL)
Rebecca Edwards (ENG)

Third and fourth place

4 May 2025
13:15

Hampstead & Westminster	2–3	East Grinstead
Hyams 11'; Tynan 52'	Report	Shannon 7'; Giglio 32'; Mills 55'

Nottingham Hockey Centre, Nottingham
Umpires:
Clare Barwood (WAL)
Clare White (ENG)

Final

4 May 2025
18:00

Reading	1–0	Surbiton
Findlay 25'	Report

Nottingham Hockey Centre, Nottingham
Umpires:
Rebecca Edwards (WAL)
Hannah Harrison (ENG)

==== Finals squads ====
East Grinstead
1. Mila Welch (GK)
2. Olivia Shannon
4. Sally Sime
5. Alexandra Malzer
7. Camilla Giglio
8. Pippa Lock
9. Courtney Hansford (C)
11. Carlota Gómez
12. Lily Walker
13. Elena Rayer
14. Tessa Howard
15. Biba Mills
17. Chloe Brown
18. Mollie Mason
19. Rosemary Hope
23. Emma Bandurak
23. Amelie Carter
27. Ruby Massey (GK)
31. Grace Balsdon
32. Connie Penlington
Hampstead & Westminster
1. Miriam Pritchard (GK)
3. Rose Tynan
4. Carys Isherwood
5. Olivia Hamilton
8. Phoebe Willars
9. Jasmine Clark
10. Tyler Lench
14. Sofia Martin
15. Catherine De Ledesma
16. Philippa Lewis
18. Hannah Davey
19. Emily Rowlands
22. Joie Leigh
23. Rachel Greenwood
24. Holly Hunt
25. Lucy Hyams
27. Freya Wilks
29. Esme Burge (C)
30. Lauren Hunt
31. Iona Campbell
34. Frederique Briscoe (GK)
49. Caoimhe Byrne
Reading
1. Ruby Butterfield (GK)
2. Nicola Cochrane (GK)
3. Anna Crowley
4. Lorna Mackenzie
5. Abbie Dixon
8. Emma Findlay
9. Jemima Copeman
10. Elizabeth Neal
11. Annie Wilson
12. Mia Moore
16. Katie Partridge
17. Sarah Spooner
18. Anna-Rose Gabbitass
19. Georgia Jones
20. Caroline Spence
21. Lucie Daman (C)
25. Eliza Chippendale
27. Joanne Pinner
28. Georgia Howe
Surbiton
1. Amber Walton (GK)
2. Giselle Ansley
3. Elizabeth Thompson
4. Charlotte Ross
5. Darcy Bourne
6. Alice Wills
8. Erica Sanders
9. Meg Dowthwaite
11. Holly Payne
12. Sophie Hamilton
13. Eloise Stenner
15. Martha Taylor
16. Emma Uprichard
17. Ellie Mackenzie
18. Isabelle Petter
19. Katherine Curtis
21. Isabelle Yonge
23. Alice Sharp (C)
24. Josefina Hippe
26. Ella Burnley
29. Katie Southorn
31. Matilda Gibson
34. Jemma Woods (GK)
35. Laura Myers (GK)

=== Division One North ===
Pos	Team	P	W	L	D	Pts
1	Durham University W1s	18	17	0	1	51
2	Beeston W1s	18	16	0	2	49
3	Buckingham W1s	18	11	2	5	35
4	Repton W1s	18	8	0	10	24
5	Gloucester City W1s	18	7	3	8	23
6	Ben Rhydding W1s	18	6	3	9	21
7	Olton & West Warwicks W1s	18	6	2	10	20
8	Pendle Forest W1s	18	5	3	10	18
9	Leicester City W1s (R)	18	6	0	12	18
10	Wakefield W1s (R)	18	1	1	16	4

=== Division One South ===
Pos	Team	P	W	L	D	Pts
1	Barnes W1s	18	14	1	3	43
2	Isca & University of Exeter W1s	18	12	3	3	39
3	Harleston Magpies W1s	18	8	5	5	29
4	Guildford W1s	18	8	5	5	29
5	Southgate W1s	18	8	4	6	28
6	Surbiton W2s	18	7	4	7	25
7	Sevenoaks	18	5	5	8	20
8	Bristol Firebrands W1s	18	5	2	11	17
9	Wimbledon W2s (R)	18	3	3	12	12
10	Slough W1s (R)	18	2	4	12	10

=== Conference East ===
Pos	Team	P	W	D	L	Pts
1	Teddington W1s	18	13	4	1	43
2	Hampstead & Westminster W2s	18	12	5	1	41
3	London Wayfarers W1s	18	9	4	5	31
4	Spencer W1s	18	8	7	3	26
5	Old Loughtonians W1s	18	6	4	8	22
6	Canterbury W1s	18	5	4	9	19
7	Wapping W1s	18	4	6	8	18
8	Old Georgians W1s	18	3	7	8	16
9	Sevenoaks W2s (R)	18	3	4	11	13
10	East London W1s (R)	18	2	5	11	11

=== Conference Midlands ===
Pos	Team	P	W	D	L	Pts
1	Loughborough Students W2s	18	15	2	1	47
2	Cambridge City W1s	18	12	2	4	38
3	Stourport W1s	18	9	2	7	29
4	University of Birmingham W2s	18	7	6	5	27
5	St Albans W1s	18	7	5	6	26
6	Cambridge University W1s	18	7	4	7	25
7	Cannock W1s	18	5	5	8	20
8	Oxford Hawks W1s	18	5	2	11	17
9	Beeston W2s (R)	18	4	4	10	16
10	Bedford W1s (R)	18	2	2	14	8

=== Conference North ===
Pos	Team	P	W	D	L	Pts
1	Leeds W1s	18	12	3	3	39
2	Fylde W1s	18	11	4	3	37
3	Whitley Bay & Tynemouth Hockey W1s	18	11	2	5	35
4	Bowdon W2s	18	10	2	6	32
5	Durham University W2s	18	8	4	6	28
6	Alderley Edge W1s	18	8	2	8	26
7	Newcastle University W1s	18	6	4	8	22
8	Didsbury Northern W1s	18	5	3	10	18
9	Doncaster W1s (R)	18	5	2	11	17
10	Harrogate W1s (R)	18	0	2	16	2

=== Conference West ===
Pos	Team	P	W	D	L	Pts
1	Reading W2s	18	14	3	1	45
2	Trojans W1s	18	10	4	4	34
3	Clifton Robinsons W2s	18	9	4	5	31
4	Lansdown W1s	18	8	6	4	30
5	Cheltenham W1s	18	9	3	6	30
6	Team Bath Buccaneers W1s	18	8	2	8	26
7	Marlow W1s	18	5	4	9	19
8	Exeter W1s	18	5	4	9	19
9	Swansea W1s (R)	18	4	2	12	14
10	Witney W1s (R)	18	0	4	14	4

== England Hockey Women's Championship Cup ==
Not completed

== See also ==
2024–25 Men's England Hockey League season
