= 2022–23 Women's England Hockey League season =

English field hockey season

Women's England Hockey League
- Champions: East Grinstead

The 2022–23 Women's England Hockey League season (sponsored by Vitality) was the 2022–23 season of England's field hockey league structure and England Hockey Women's Championship Cup.

The season started on 24 September 2022. Surbiton are the defending league champions and Beeston are the defending cup holders. The Premier League play offs returned.

East Grinstead won their first ever title after beating Surbiton 3–2 in the play off final.

Beeston defeated Guildford in the England Hockey Women's Championship Cup final.

== 2022–2023 teams ==
=== Premier Division ===
Team	City/town	Home pitch
Beeston	Beeston, Nottinghamshire	Nottingham Hockey Centre
Buckingham	Buckingham	Stowe School
Clifton Robinsons	Westbury-on-Trym, Bristol	Coombe Dingle Sports Centre
East Grinstead	East Grinstead, West Sussex	East Grinstead Sports Club
Hampstead & Westminster	Maida Vale	Paddington Recreation Ground
Holcombe	Rochester, Kent	Holcombe Park
Loughborough Students	Loughborough, Leicestershire	Loughborough University
Reading	Reading, Berkshire	Sonning Lane
Surbiton	Long Ditton, Surrey	Sugden Road
University of Birmingham	Birmingham	Bournbrook
University of Nottingham	Nottingham	David Ross Sports Village, Nottingham Hockey Centre
Wimbledon 1st XI	Wimbledon, London	Raynes Park High School, King's College School

=== Division One South ===
Team	City/town	Home pitch
Barnes W1s	Chiswick, West London	Duke's Meadow, Dan Mason Drive
Cambridge City W1s	Cambridge	Wilberforce Road
Canterbury W1s	Canterbury	Polo Farm
Harleston Magpies W1s	Harleston	Shotford Heath
Isca & University of Exeter W1s	Exeter	University of Exeter Sports Park
Sevenoaks W1s	Sevenoaks, Kent	Vine Cricket Ground
Slough W1s	Slough, Berkshire	Upton Park, Upton Road
Surbiton W2s	Long Ditton, Surrey	Sugden Road
Witney W1s	Witney, Oxfordshire	Wood Green School, Woodstock Road
Wimbledon W2s	Wimbledon, London	Raynes Park High School, King's College School

=== Division One North ===
Team	City/town	Home pitch
Ben Rhydding W1s	Ben Rhydding	Coutances Way
Bowdon Hightown W1s	Bowdon, Greater Manchester	The Bowdon Club
Brooklands Poynton W1s	Sale, Greater Manchester	Brooklands Sports Club
Durham University W1s	Durham	The Graham Sports Centre
Gloucester City W1s	Gloucester	Plock Court and St Peter's High School
Leeds W1s	Leeds	Sports Park Weetwood
Leicester City W1s	Leicester	Leicester Grammar School
Stourport W1s	Stourport-on-Severn	Stourport Sports Club
Sutton Coldfield W1s	Sutton Coldfield	Rectory Park
Swansea W1s	Swansea	Swansea University's International Sports Village

== Final table ==
=== Premier Division ===
Pos	Team	P	W	L	D	Pts	Section
1	Surbiton	16	15	0	1	45	top 6
2	Wimbledon	16	9	6	1	33	
3	Hampstead & Westminster	16	8	4	4	28	
4	East Grinstead	16	7	5	4	26	
5	Beeston	16	7	3	6	24	
6	Clifton Robinsons	16	4	4	8	16	
7	University of Nottingham	16	6	3	7	21	bottom 6
8	University of Birmingham	16	5	4	7	19	
9	Loughborough Students	16	4	5	7	17	
10	Reading	16	4	3	9	15	
11	Holcombe (R)	16	3	5	8	14	
12	Buckingham (R)	16	3	0	13	9	

==== Play-offs ====
The semi-finals took place on 1 April and the final on 2 April, at the Surbiton Hockey Club.

Semi-finals
1 Apr – Long Ditton
Surbiton	5
Hampstead & Westminster	3
1 Apr – Long Ditton
Clifton Robinsons	3 (8)p
East Grinstead	3 (9)p

Final
2 Apr – Long Ditton
Surbiton	2
East Grinstead	3

East Grinstead
Isabel Field (gk), Sally Sime (FG, 61st minute), Alex Malzer, Amy Thompson, Guadalupe Fernández Lacort (c), Harriet Mitchell, Courtney Hansford, Laura Roper (PC, 11th minute), Carlota Gomez, Tessa Howard, Olivia Breed, Anna Faulstich (FG, 18th minute), Chloe Brown, Mollie Mason, Sophie Bray, Pip Lock

Surbiton
Sabbie Heesh (gk), Louisa Bray (gk) Giselle Ansley, Darcy Bourne, Alice Wills, Meg Dowthwaite, Hannah Martin, Holly Payne, Sophie Hamilton (FG, 39th minute), Eloise Stenner, Steph Elliott (c), Leah Wilkinson (PC, 33rd minute), Izzy Petter, Amy Costello, Alice Sharp, Martha le Huray

=== Division One North ===
Pos	Team	P	W	L	D	Pts
1	Bowdon Hightown W1s (P)	18	15	1	2	46
2	Stourport W1s	18	14	2	2	44
3	Durham University W1s	18	11	5	2	38
4	Leicester City W1s	18	7	4	7	25
5	Sutton Coldfield W1s	18	6	4	8	22
6	Swansea W1s	18	5	4	9	19
7	Ben Rhydding W1s	18	5	3	10	18
8	Gloucester City W1s	18	4	4	10	16
9	Leeds W1s (R)	18	4	3	11	15
10	Brooklands Poynton W1s (R)	18	3	2	13	11

=== Division One South ===
Pos	Team	P	W	L	D	Pts
1	Isca & University of Exeter W1s (P)	18	14	3	1	45
2	Sevenoaks W1s	18	12	1	5	37
3	Barnes W1s	18	10	6	2	36
4	Slough W1s	18	8	5	5	29
5	Surbiton W2s	18	5	9	4	24
6	Wimbledon W2s	18	5	5	8	20
7	Canterbury W1s	18	4	5	9	17
8	Harleston Magpies W1s	18	4	4	10	16
9	Cambridge City W1s (R)	18	3	4	11	13
10	Witney W1s (R)	18	1	6	11	9

=== Conference East ===
Pos	Team	P	W	D	L	Pts
1	Southgate W1s	18	18	0	0	54
2	Guildford W1s	18	16	0	2	48
3	Hampstead & Westminster W2s	18	12	2	4	38
4	London Wayfarers W1s	18	9	3	6	30
5	Spencer W1s	18	7	1	10	22
6	Ipswich W1s	18	6	3	9	21
7	East London W1s	18	5	4	9	19
8	Horsham W1s	18	4	4	10	16
9	Chelmsford W1s (R)	18	2	2	14	8
10	Bishops Stortford W1s (R)	18	1	1	16	4

=== Conference Midlands ===
Pos	Team	P	W	D	L	Pts
1	Olton & West Warwickshire W1s	18	13	4	1	43
2	University of Birmingham W2s	18	8	4	6	28
3	Bedford W1s	18	8	4	6	28
4	St Albans W1s	18	7	3	8	24
5	Oxford University W1s	18	6	6	6	24
6	Beeston W2s	18	6	5	7	23
7	Cannock W1s	18	6	4	8	22
8	Belper W1s	18	6	3	9	21
9	Loughborough Students W2s (R)	18	4	8	6	19
10	Rugby & East Warwickshire W1s (R)	18	5	1	12	16

=== Conference North ===
Pos	Team	P	W	D	L	Pts
1	Wakefield W1s	18	12	3	3	39
2	Pendle Forest W1s	18	10	3	5	33
3	Didsbury Northern W1s	18	10	3	5	33
4	Doncaster W1s	18	8	5	5	29
5	Fylde W1s	18	8	5	6	26
6	Timperley W1s	18	7	5	6	26
7	Durham University W2s	18	6	5	7	23
8	Harrogate W1s	18	4	6	8	18
9	Liverpool Sefton W1s (R)	18	2	6	10	12
10	Alderley Edge W1s (R)	18	1	5	12	8

=== Conference West ===
Pos	Team	P	W	D	L	Pts
1	Team Bath Buccaneers W1s	18	13	3	2	42
2	Oxford Hawks W1s	18	10	4	4	34
3	Exe W1s	18	8	4	6	28
4	Bristol Firebrands W1s	18	8	3	7	27
5	Trojans W1s	18	8	2	8	26
6	Cheltenham W1s	18	6	3	9	21
7	Reading W2s	18	5	5	8	20
8	Basingstoke W1s	18	6	2	10	20
9	Penarth W1s (R)	18	5	4	9	19
10	Isca & University of Exeter W2s (R)	18	4	4	10	16

== England Hockey Women's Championship Cup ==
=== Semi-finals ===
Date	Team 1	Team 2	Score
16 Apr	Clifton Robinsons	Beeston	4–4 (p)
16 Apr	Liverpool Sefton	Guildford	2–7

=== Final ===
- Lee Valley Hockey and Tennis Centre

Date	Team 1	Team 2	Score	Scorers
1 May	Beeston	Guildford	4–2	Burrell (2), Robinson, Miller / Wood, Farrar

Beeston
Steph Tirrell (gk), Nicola Moss, Julie Whiting, Ella Cusack, Cerys Miller, Jane Kilpatrick, lauren Burrell (c), Hannah grieve, Beatrice Bell, Maddie Pendle, Sophie Robinson, Jess Hood, Madeleine Newitt, Nadia Benallal, Lauren Dunn, Rosy Stephens

Guildford
Rose Thomas, Kelly Taylor (c), Stephanie Smith, Anna Kurovska, Charlotte Barr, Nicola Wren, Valeriia Tyschenko, Georgie Lawes, Alex medlicott, Robyn Bentley, Alice Welland, Katerina Xenoudakis, Lucy Wood, Abbi Howgate, Helen Jelley, Juliet Farrar

== Conference divisions ==
Below the top three divisions are four Conference divisions - Midlands, North, East and West.

== See also ==
2022–23 Men's England Hockey League season
