= 2020–21 Women's Hockey League season =

Women's England Hockey League

The 2020–21 Women's England Hockey League season (sponsored by Vitality) was the 2020-21 season of England's field hockey league structure and the England Hockey Women's Championship Cup. The COVID-19 pandemic in the United Kingdom caused severe disruption with the season starting on 19 September 2020, five months later than scheduled and just two weeks after the delayed 2019-20 season had finally ended. However, after just five rounds of games the season was suspended during October 2020 due to COVID-19 once again. During March 2021 it became evident that the fixtures could not be fulfilled and the season was cancelled.

The 2020-21 Premier Division would see Surbiton defend the title. Wimbledon (winners of Division 1 South) and Swansea (winners of Division 1 North) joined the division to make an eleven team league instead of ten teams, with Bowdon being relegated. It was the first season since 2011 not to be sponsored by Investec. After five rounds from 19 September until 24 October East Grinstead topped the table before the league was suspended.

The Championship Cup was consolidated and rearranged as an early Summer tournament. East Grinstead who were leading the Premier Division at the time of its suspension gained consolation by defeating Clifton Robinsons 5-3 in the final.

== Standings at the time of league cancellation ==
=== Premier Division ===
Pos	Team	P	W	L	D	GF	GA	GD	Pts
1	East Grinstead	6	5	1	0	12	5	7	16
2	Wimbledon	6	4	0	2	11	7	4	12
3	Loughborough Students	4	3	1	0	7	2	5	10
4	Hampstead & Westminster	5	3	0	2	9	7	1	9
5	Surbiton	4	2	1	1	6	1	5	7
6	Buckingham	5	2	1	2	7	9	-2	7
7	Clifton Robinsons	4	2	0	2	9	6	3	6
8	Holcombe	5	2	0	3	9	6	3	6
9	Beeston	5	1	1	3	4	6	-2	4
10	University of Birmingham	5	0	1	4	4	11	-7	1
11	Swansea	5	0	0	5	1	19	-18	0

=== Division One South ===
Pos	Team	P	W	L	D	GF	GA	GD	Pts
1	Reading	6	4	2	0	14	8	6	14
2	Sevenoaks	5	3	1	1	8	5	3	10
3	Wimbledon 2nd XI	6	3	1	2	9	8	1	10
4	Cambridge City	5	2	3	0	9	7	2	9
5	Slough	6	2	2	2	9	7	2	8
6	Canterbury	5	2	2	1	5	4	1	8
7	Trojans	6	2	0	4	6	9	-3	6
8	Harleston Magpies	6	1	2	3	5	7	-2	5
9	Surbiton 2nd XI	6	0	2	4	5	11	-6	2
10	Isca & University of Exeter	3	0	1	2	1	5	-4	1

=== Division One North ===
Pos	Team	P	W	L	D	GF	GA	GD	Pts
1	Stourport	5	4	0	1	13	5	8	12
2	Leicester City	5	4	0	1	13	6	7	12
3	Bowdon Hightown	4	3	1	0	7	3	4	10
4	Durham University	5	3	0	2	14	6	8	9
5	Brooklands Poynton	3	3	0	0	7	2	5	9
6	Olton & West Warwicks	5	2	1	2	8	10	-2	7
7	Gloucester City	5	2	0	3	3	12	-9	6
8	Ben Rhydding	6	1	0	5	8	13	-5	3
9	University of Nottingham	3	0	0	3	3	7	-4	0
10	Belper	5	0	0	5	1	13	-12	0

== England Hockey Women's Championship Cup ==
=== Quarter-finals ===
Date	Team 1	Team 2	Score
27 June	Gloucester City	Clifton Robinsons	1-2
27 June	Sonning	East Grinstead	1-7
27 June	Spencer	Southgate	0-3
27 June	Timperley	Repton	0-12

=== Semi-finals ===
Date	Team 1	Team 2	Score
4 July	Repton	Clifton Robinsons	1-3
4 July	East Grinstead	Southgate	8-2

=== Final ===
- Nottingham Hockey Centre

Date	Team 1	Team 2	Score	Scorers
10 July	East Grinstead	Clifton Robinsons	5-3	Bray (4), Bowdon / Porter (2),

== See also ==
- 2020–21 Men's Hockey League season
