= Yorkshire and North East Hockey =

Field hockey governing body in England

Yorkshire & North East Hockey
- Sport: Hockey
- Jurisdiction: Yorkshire & North East
- Abbreviation: YNE Hockey
- Affiliation: England Hockey

Official website
- yne.englandhockey.co.uk

Yorkshire and North East Hockey runs hockey in Yorkshire and the North East of England. It feeds teams into the Men's and Women's England Hockey Leagues and receives teams from regional and county leagues.

== League Structure ==
The men's and women's leagues both share a similar structure consisting of a Premier Division and a Division 1, followed by regional and sub-regional divisions.

Yorkshire and North East Hockey was created in 2021 as part of England Hockey's "Eight Areas" restructuring of regional leagues. At a regional level, YNE Hockey replaced the Yorkshire Hockey Association and the North East League of the North Hockey Association. Lower-level sub-regional hockey associations were dissolved and their functions transferred to YNE Hockey. The YNE area covers the following counties:

- East Riding of Yorkshire
- North Yorkshire
- South Yorkshire
- West Yorkshire
- Lincolnshire
- Nottinghamshire
- County Durham
- Tyne and Wear

== Recent Champions ==
Extended content

Yorkshire & North East Men's League Premier Division

Season	Champions	Runners Up
2001–02	Bowdon M1s	Ben Rhydding M1s
2002–03	Sheffield University Bankers M1s	Ben Rhydding M1s
2003–04	Harrogate M1s	Sheffield University Bankers M1s
2004–05	Brooklands MU M2s	Sheffield Hallam M1
2005–06	Sheffield University Bankers M1s	Oxton M1s
2006–07	Kingston-upon-Hull M1s	University of Durham M1s
2007–08	University of Durham M1s	Preston M1s
2008–09	Bowdon M2s	Deeside Ramblers M1s
2009–10	Bowdon M2s	Ben Rhydding M1s
2010–11	Preston M1s	Wakefield M1s
2011–12	Wakefield M1s	Sheffield University Bankers M1s
2012–13	Deeside Ramblers M1s	Oxton M1s
2013–14	Doncaster M1s	Oxton M1s
2014–15	Brooklands MU M2s	Preston M1s
2015–16	Brooklands MU M2s	Oxton M1s
2016-17	Leeds M1s	Brooklands MU M2s
2017–18	Brooklands MU M2s	Alderley Edge M1s
2018–19	Wakefield M1s	Deeside Ramblers M1s
2019–20	University of Durham M2s	Leeds M2s
2020–21	Cancelled due to COVID-19	
2021–22		
2022–23	Lindum M1s	University of Durham M2s
2023–24	University of Durham M2s	Newcastle University M1s
2024–25	Newcastle University M1s	Stockton M1s
2025–26	Sheffield University Bankers M1s	Stockton M1s

Yorkshire & North East Women's Premier Division

Season	Champions	Runners Up
2001–02		
2002–03	Ben Rhydding W1s	Timperley W1s
2003–04	Chester W1s	Whitley Bay W1s
2004–05	Whitley Bay W1s	Pendle Forest W1s
2005–06	University of Durham W1s	Sheffield Hallam W1s
2006–07	Sheffield Hallam W1s	Springfield W1s
2007–08	Springfield W1s	Deeside Ramblers W1s
2008–09	Sheffield Hallam W1s	Wigton W1s
2009–10	Springfield W1s	Ben Rhydding W1s
2010–11	Liverpool Sefton W1s	Ben Rhydding W1s
2011–12	Ben Rhydding W1s	Bowdon W2s
2012–13	Bowdon W2s	University of Durham W2s
2013–14	University of Durham W2s	Liverpool Sefton W1s
2014–15	Springfield W1s	Doncaster W1s
2015–16	Timperley W1s	Doncaster W1s
2016–17	Fylde W1s	Whitley Bay and Tynemouth W1s
2017–18	Leeds W1s	Whitley Bay and Tynemouth W1s
2018–19	Pendle Forest W1s	Doncaster W1s
2019–20	Didsbury Northern W1s	University of Durham W2s
2020–21	Cancelled due to COVID-19	
2021–22		
2022–23	Newcastle University W1s	City of York W1s
2023–24	Whitley Bay and Tynemouth W1s	Morpeth W1s
2024–25	Sheffield W1s	University of Durham W3s
2025–26	City Of York W1s	Stokesley Ladies W1s
