= North West Hockey =

- Sport: Field Hockey
- Jurisdiction: North West of England
- Abbreviation: NWH
- Affiliation: England Hockey

Official website
- www.northhockey.org

North West Hockey runs hockey leagues based in the North West of England. It feeds teams into the Men's and Women's England Hockey Leagues and receives teams from regional and county leagues.

== League Structure ==
The men's and women's leagues both share a similar structure consisting of a Premier Division, and then regional and sub-regional divisions. North West Hockey was created in 2021 as part of England Hockey's "Eight Areas" restructuring of regional leagues.

At a regional level, the North Hockey Association was split and replaced with North West Hockey and Yorkshire and North East Hockey. The North West area covers the following counties:

- Cheshire
- Cumbria
- Greater Manchester
- Lancashire
- Merseyside

== Recent Champions ==
Extended content

North West Men's Premier Division

| Season | Champions | Runners Up |
|---|---|---|
| 2001–02 | Bowdon M1s | Ben Rhydding M1s |
| 2002–03 | Sheffield University Bankers M1s | Ben Rhydding M1s |
| 2003–04 | Harrogate M1s | Sheffield University Bankers M1s |
| 2004–05 | Brooklands MU M2s | Sheffield Hallam M1s |
| 2005–06 | Sheffield University Bankers M1s | Oxton M1s |
| 2006–07 | Kingston-upon-Hull M1s | University of Durham M1s |
| 2007–08 | University of Durham M1s | Preston M1s |
| 2008–09 | Bowdon M2s | Deeside Ramblers M1s |
| 2009–10 | Bowdon M2s | Ben Rhydding M1s |
| 2010–11 | Preston M1s | Wakefield M1s |
| 2011–12 | Wakefield M1s | Sheffield University Bankers M1s |
| 2012–13 | Deeside Ramblers M1s | Oxton M1s |
| 2013–14 | Doncaster M1s | Oxton M1s |
| 2014–15 | Brooklands MU M2s | Preston M1s |
| 2015–16 | Brooklands MU M2s | Oxton M1s |
| 2016-17 | Leeds M1s | Brooklands MU M2s |
| 2017–18 | Brooklands MU M2s | Alderley Edge M1s |
| 2018–19 | Wakefield M1s | Deeside Ramblers M1s |
| 2019–20 | University of Durham M2s | Leeds M2s |
| 2020–21 | Cancelled due to COVID-19 | |
| 2021–22 | | |
| 2022–23 | Oxton M1s | Neston M1s |
| 2023–24 | Didsbury Northern M1s | Neston M1s |
| 2024–25 | Neston M1s | Bowdon M2s |
| 2025–26 | Brooklands MU M2s | Bowdon M2s |

North West Women's Premier Division

| Season | Champions | Runners Up |
|---|---|---|
| 2001–02 | | |
| 2002–03 | Ben Rhydding W1s | Timperley W1s |
| 2003–04 | Chester W1s | Whitley Bay W1s |
| 2004–05 | Whitley Bay W1s | Pendle Forest W1s |
| 2005–06 | University of Durham W1s | Sheffield Hallam W1s |
| 2006–07 | Sheffield Hallam W1s | Springfield W1s |
| 2007–08 | Springfield W1s | Deeside Ramblers W1s |
| 2008–09 | Sheffield Hallam W1s | Wigton W1s |
| 2009–10 | Springfield W1s | Ben Rhydding W1s |
| 2010–11 | Liverpool Sefton W1s | Ben Rhydding W1s |
| 2011–12 | Ben Rhydding W1s | Bowdon W2s |
| 2012–13 | Bowdon W2s | University of Durham W2s |
| 2013–14 | University of Durham W2s | Liverpool Sefton W1s |
| 2014–15 | Springfield W1s | Doncaster W1s |
| 2015–16 | Timperley W1s | Doncaster W1s |
| 2016–17 | Fylde W1s | Whitley Bay and Tynemouth W1s |
| 2017–18 | Leeds W1s | Whitley Bay and Tynemouth W1s |
| 2018–19 | Pendle Forest W1s | Doncaster W1s |
| 2019–20 | Didsbury Northern W1s | University of Durham W2s |
| 2020–21 | Cancelled due to COVID-19 | |
| 2021–22 | | |
| 2022–23 | Bowdon W2s | Neston W1s |
| 2023–24 | Alderley Edge W1s | Liverpool Sefton W1s |
| 2024–25 | Kirkby Stephen W1s | Brooklands-Poynton W1s |
| 2025–26 | Timperley W1s | Liverpool Sefton W1s |
