= Phil Roper =

English field hockey player (born 1992)

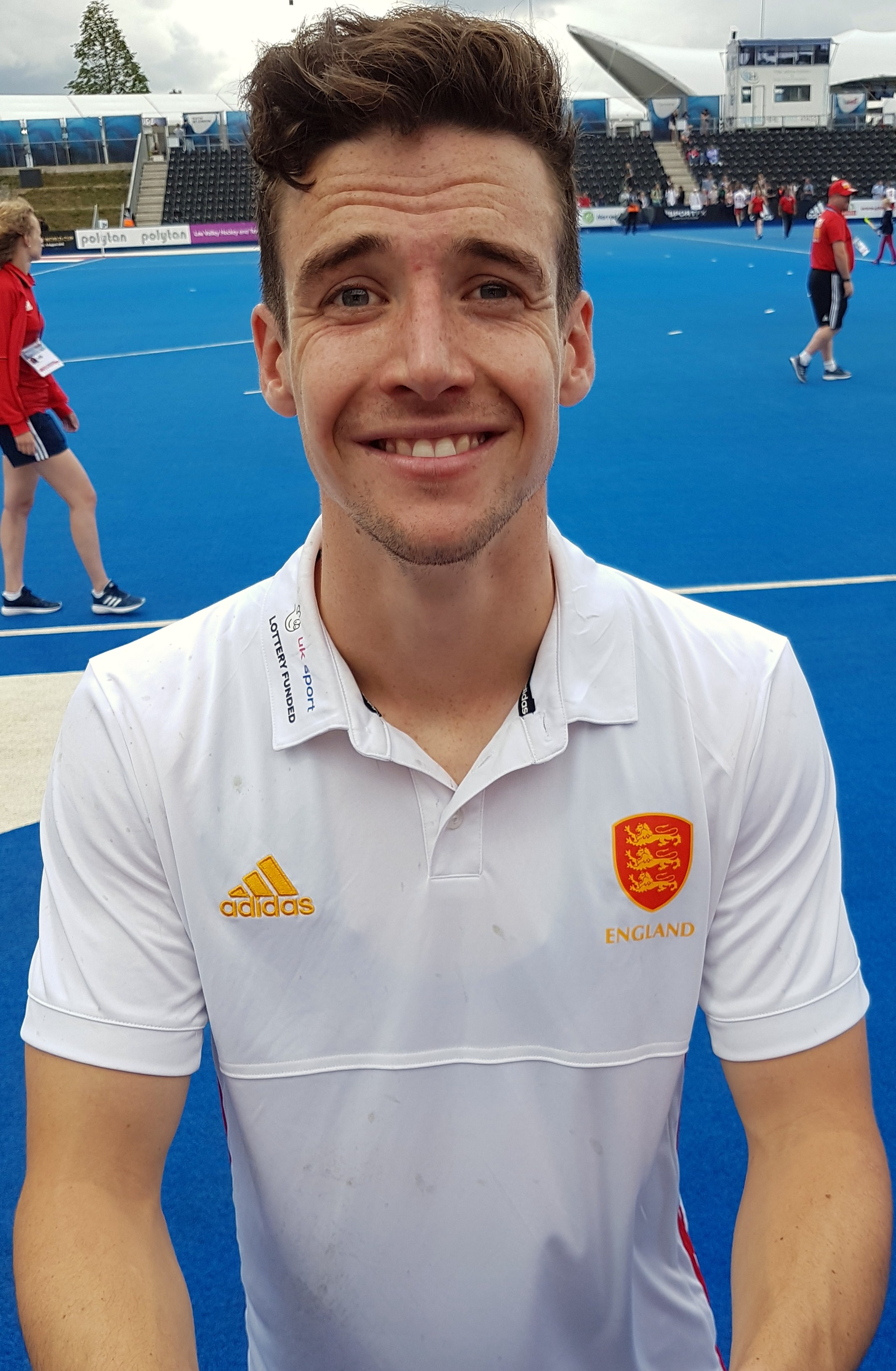

Personal information
- Born: 24 January 1992 (age 34) Chester, England
- Height: 1.80 m (5 ft 11 in)
- Weight: 66 kg (146 lb)

Sport
- Sport: Field hockey
- Position: Midfielder / Forward
Youth career
- Years: Team
- 2000–2010: Chester HC
Senior career
Years	Team	Caps	Goals
2008-2009	Brooklands MU	-	-
2010-2013	Sheffield Hallam	-	-
2013-2021	Wimbledon	-	-
2021-2022	Oranje-Rood	-	-
2022-2023	Holcombe	-	-
2024–2026	Old Georgians	-	-
National team
Years	Team	Caps	Goals
2013–present	England & GB	163	(39)
Medal record
Commonwealth Games
Bronze medal – third place	2014 Glasgow	Team
Bronze medal – third place	2018 Gold Coast	Team
Bronze medal – third place	2022 Birmingham	Team
EuroHockey Championship
Silver medal – second place	2023 Mönchengladbach
Bronze medal – third place	2017 Amstelveen

Phillip Andrew Roper (born 24 January 1992) is an English field hockey player who plays as a midfielder or forward for Old Georgians and the England and Great Britain national teams. He competed at the 2020 Summer Olympics and 2024 Summer Olympics.

== Biography ==
=== Club career ===
Roper started playing hockey, aged 8, for his local club Chester HC and played there for ten years before going to university, where he played for Sheffield Hallam. He played club hockey for Brooklands MU and Wimbledon before joining Dutch club Oranje-Rood for the 2021–22 season.

Roper played for Holcombe during the 2022-2023 season before joining Old Georgians. He helped Old Georgians finish runner-up to Surbiton during the 2024–25 season.

=== International career ===
Roper made his international debut in 2013. He competed for England in the men's hockey tournament at the 2014 Commonwealth Games where he won a bronze medal. On 24 May 2017 he was named as one of a three-man captaincy group, for England and Great Britain. It was a new captaincy structure for the men's international teams. He represented England and won a bronze medal at the 2018 Commonwealth Games in Gold Coast.

On 28 May 2021, he was selected in the England squad for the 2021 EuroHockey Championship and was selected to represent Great Britain for the delayed 2020 Olympic Games in Tokyo.

He won a bronze medal with England in the Men's tournament at the 2022 Commonwealth Games in Birmingham and won a silver medal with England at the 2023 Men's EuroHockey Championship in Mönchengladbach.

He was selected to represent Great Britain at the 2024 Summer Olympics. The team went out in the quarter-finals after losing a penalty shootout to India.

He won another Premier league title with Old Georgians in 2026.

=== Other pursuits ===
Roper presents the popular Let’s Stick Together podcast alongside fellow international hockey players Brendan Creed and Joep de Mol. He is also a partner in The Social Bean a boutique coffee business, alongside Old Georgians teammate Chris Griffiths (field hockey), as well as David Goodfield, and Jacob Draper.
