= Martin Brough =

Welsh field hockey player

Sport
- Sport: Field hockey
- Position: Right-half
Senior career
Years	Team	Caps	Goals
1974–1975	Swansea	-	-
1978–1980	Harborne	-	-
1981	Swansea	-	-
1981–1989	Olton & West Warwickshire	-	-
National team
Years	Team	Caps	Goals
–	Wales	50	-
–	Great Britain		-

Martin Brough is a former hockey international player, who represented Wales and Great Britain. He was selected in the training squad for the 1980 Summer Olympics.

== Biography ==
Brough studied at the University of Oxford and played for their hockey team during the 73rd varsity match in 1973, scoring the only goal of the game. Brough played club hockey for Swansea Hockey Club, earning Welsh caps while at the club.

A pivotal year arrived in 1978, when he took a position teaching at Solihull School, he taught History, Business Studies and Economics and much later in 2004 became head of Business Studies. The same year of 1978 saw Brough sign for Harborne Hockey Club and play in the Intercontinental Cup tournament in Kuala Lumpur.

Although missing out on the initial 22-strong squad for the Great Britain team for the 1980 Olympic Games in Moscow, he later made the 20-man squad selected but subsequently did not attend due to the boycott. He would later join Olton & West Warwickshire Hockey Club and became the club captain.

He retired from teaching in 2011 but continued to play masters hockey. In 2013 he was playing over-55 representative hockey for Wales at the Three Nations tournament in Edinburgh and in 2019 was in the over-65 age category for Wales at the Grand Masters Hockey European Cup 2019.
