= Derek Leaver =

Derek Leaver may refer to:

- Derek Leaver (footballer), English footballer
- Derek Leaver (chemist), British chemist
