= Jamie Cachia =

Scottish field hockey player

Personal information
- Born: 7 September 1987 (age 38)

Sport
- Sport: Field hockey
- Position: Goalkeeper
Senior career
Years	Team	Caps	Goals
2006–2010	Durham University	-	-
2010–2011	Bowdon	-	-
2011–2014	Sheffield	-	-
2014–2022	Beeston	-	-
National team
Years	Team	Caps	Goals
2010–2015	Scotland	50	-
Medal record
Representing Scotland
European Championship II
Bronze medal – third place	2011 Vinnytsia	Team
Bronze medal – third place	2015 Prague	Team

James Douglas Cachia (born 7 September 1987) is a Scottish former field hockey goalkeeper who played for the Scotland men's national field hockey team.

== Biography ==
Cachia was educated at Craigclowan Preparatory School and Strathallan School and studied at Durham University. He was first called into the Scotland squad whilst studying at Durham University in 2009, where he played for Durham University Hockey Club for five years.

He gained a 2:1 in Geography and Education and became a qualified geography teacher. Playing for Bowdon in 2010/11, he was selected as a travelling reserve for the Scotland squad that finished in ninth place at the 2010 Commonwealth Games. He won a bronze medal with the team at the 2011 Men's EuroHockey Championship II in Vinnytsia, Ukraine.

From 2011 to 2014 Cachia played for Sheffield Hockey Club and was also a member of the Scotland squad that played in the 2011 EuroHockey Nations Championship II in Ukraine and the 2013 EuroHockey Nations Championship II in Austria.

On 12 June 2014 Cachia was selected as a member of Team Scotland for the Glasgow 2014 Commonwealth Games. After the Commonwealth Games he joined Beeston Hockey Club in the Men's England Hockey League Premier Division. He won a bronze medal with Scotland at the 2015 Men's EuroHockey Championship II in Prague.

In 2022, Cachia became the Women's Hockey Performance Head Coach at Loughborough University - leaving his prior identical position at Birmingham University.
