= Norman Hughes =

British field hockey player

Personal information
- Born: 30 September 1952 (age 73) Nantwich, Cheshire, England
- Height: 172 cm (5 ft 8 in)
- Weight: 70 kg (154 lb)

Sport
- Sport: Field hockey
Senior career
Years	Team	Caps	Goals
1975–1989	Wakefield	-	-
National team
Years	Team	Caps	Goals
–	Great Britain		-
–	England		-
Medal record
Men's field hockey
Representing Great Britain
Olympic Games
Bronze medal – third place	1984 Los Angeles	Team competition
Champions Trophy
Bronze medal – third place	1984 Karachi	Team competition
Silver medal – second place	1985 Perth	Team competition
Representing England
World Cup
Silver medal – second place	1986 London	Team competition

Norman Hughes (born 30 September 1952) is an English former field hockey player who competed at the 1984 Summer Olympics and was a coach during the 1988 Summer Olympics.

== Biography ==
Hughes was born in Nantwich, Cheshire, and attended Crewe County Grammar School for Boys. He was also a competent cricketer.

He played club hockey for Wakefield Hockey Club in the Men's England Hockey League. He played at the 1978 Men's Hockey World Cup

He was selected for the Great Britain team for the 1980 Olympic Games in Moscow, but subsequently did not attend due to the boycott. He was however the captain of the England team at the 1982 Men's Hockey World Cup.

Hughes won a bronze medal with the Great Britain squad at the 1984 Olympic Games in Los Angeles. He was part of the bronze medal-winning Great Britain team that competed at the 1984 Men's Hockey Champions Trophy, in Karachi, Pakistan and the silver medal-winning team the following year at the 1985 Men's Hockey Champions Trophy in Perth, Australia.

He also won silver with the England squad at the 1986 Men's Hockey World Cup in London.

He later coached at Wakefield Hockey Club and went on to become both the coach of Great Britain and England.
