= Nicki Cochrane =

Scottish field hockey player

Personal information
- Born: 8 December 1993 (age 32) Glasgow, Scotland

Sport
- Sport: Field hockey
- Position: Goalkeeper
- Club: Reading
National team
Years	Team	Caps	Goals
2012–	Scotland	83	(0)
2018–2019	Great Britain	10	(0)
Medal record
Women's field hockey
Representing Scotland
EuroHockey Championship II
Gold medal – first place	2019 Glasgow	Team

Nicola Cochrane (born 8 December 1993) is a Scottish international field hockey player who plays as a goalkeeper for Scotland and Great Britain.

== Biography ==
Born in Glasgow, Cochrane attended Strathallan School and studied sport and recreation management at the University of Edinburgh.

She plays club hockey in the Investec Women's Hockey League Premier Division for Reading. Cochrane has also played club hockey for Beeston, Clifton Robinsons and Edinburgh University Hockey Club.

On the 9 February 2017 she earned her 50th cap for Scotland v Russia at the 2016–17 Women's FIH Hockey World League Round 2 tournament in Valencia; Scotland won the match 2–1.

In January 2018, Cochrane was named in the Great Britain squad to tour Argentina. She was selected for Scotland's teams at the 2018 Commonwealth Games and the 2022 Commonwealth Games.

At the end of the 2024 season, she joined Reading from Wimbledon. During the 2024–25 Women's England Hockey League season she was part of the Reading team that won the league title.
