= Bryn Williams (field hockey) =

British field hockey player

Personal information
- Born: July 1953 (age 73) Wales

Sport
- Sport: Field hockey
- Position: Centre-half
Senior career
Years	Team	Caps	Goals
1972–1975	Liverpool Univ	-	-
1975–1978	Harborne	-	-
1978–1984	Cardiff	-	-
National team
Years	Team	Caps	Goals
–	Wales		-
–	Great Britain	14	-
Medal record
Field hockey
Representing Great Britain
Champions Trophy
Bronze medal – third place	1978 Lahore	Team competition

Richard Bryn Williams (born July 1953) is a former hockey international player, who represented Wales and Great Britain. He was selected for the 1980 Summer Olympics.

== Biography ==
Williams was born in Wales, educated at Denbigh High School, Denbighshire and studied Economics at the University of Liverpool.

After University, Williams joined Harborne Hockey Club in 1975 and made his Welsh debut during the 1975 tour of South Africa. He represented Staffordshire at county level.

Williams was part of the bronze medal-winning Great Britain team that competed at the inaugural 1978 Men's Hockey Champions Trophy, in Lahore, Pakistan After moving to Cardiff Hockey Club he would later captain Wales. He was selected for the Great Britain team for the 1980 Olympic Games in Moscow, but subsequently did not attend due to the boycott.

After he stopped playing he had earned 110 caps for Wales indoors and outdoors. He then took up coaching and in 1988 took on the role of coach at Sudbury Hockey Club He was also the team manager for Wales at the 2002 Commonwealth Games in Manchester.

Williams was a chartered accountant by trade and was the executive chairman for Teamwork Technology Services, in addition to acting as a Director for Great Britain Hockey from 2006 to 2014.
