= Sally Walton =

British field hockey player, personal trainer, and hockey coach

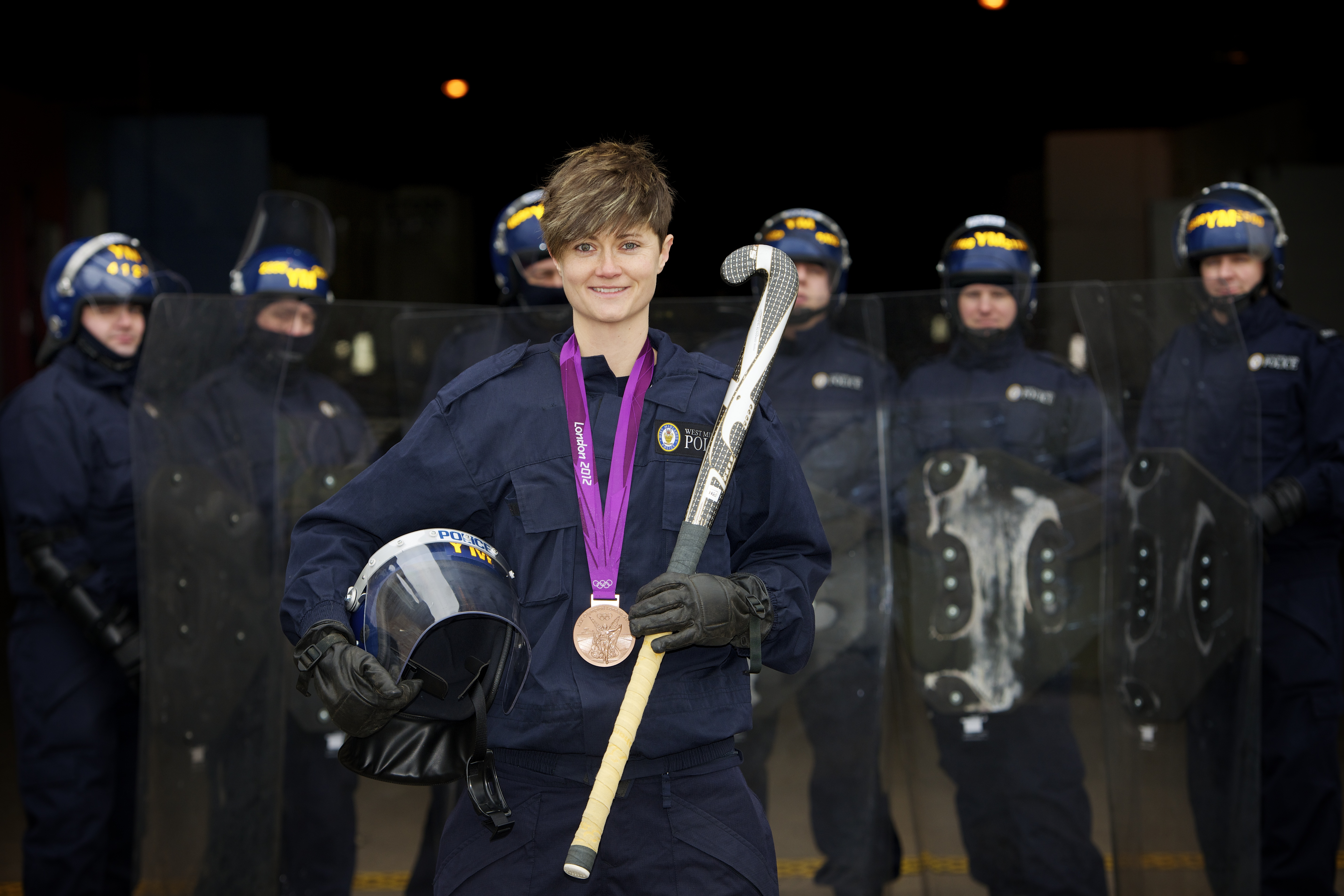
- Walton in 2013
- Born: Sally Ellen Walton; 10 June 1981 (age 45); Southport, England
- Height: 5 ft 11 in (1.80 m)
- Field hockey career
- Sport: Field hockey
- Position: Defender
Senior career
Years	Team	Caps	Goals
2024 - Present	Gloucester City	-	-
–	Bowdon Hightown	-	-
–	Hampton-in-Arden	-	-
–	Olton & West Warwick	-	-
National team
Years	Team	Caps	Goals
–	Great Britain / England		-
Medal record
Women's field hockey
Representing Great Britain
Olympic Games
Bronze medal – third place	2012 London	Team
Champions Trophy
Silver medal – second place	2012 Rosario	Team
Bronze medal – third place	2010 Nottingham	Team
Representing England
European Championship
Bronze medal – third place	2005 Dublin	Team
Bronze medal – third place	2007 Manchester	Team
Bronze medal – third place	2009 Amsterdam	Team
Bronze medal – third place	2011 Gladbach	Team
World Cup
Bronze medal – third place	2010 Rosario	Team
Commonwealth Games
Bronze medal – third place	2010 Dehli	Team
Champions Challenge
Bronze medal – third place	2007 Baku	Team
Indoor European Championship III
Gold medal – first place	2010	Team
Association football career
- Position: Left-back
Senior career*
Years	Team	Apps	(Gls)
2003–2004	Aston Villa	1+	(1+)
- * Club domestic league appearances and goals

Sally Ellen Walton (born 10 June 1981) is a British field hockey player, personal trainer, and the Head of Hockey at the Royal Grammar School Worcester. An Olympic bronze medallist at the 2012 Summer Olympics, she currently plays club hockey for Gloucester City Hockey Club in the England Hockey Women's Hockey League Division 1 North.

Walton made her international debut in 2005. At the 2012 Summer Olympics, she competed for the Great Britain in the women's tournament helping them to win the bronze medal.

Walton has played club hockey for Bowdon Hightown, Hampton-in-Arden Hockey Club, and Olton and West Warwickshire. She currently plays for Gloucester City Hockey Club in the England Hockey Women's Hockey League Division 1 North, where she also leads performance camps and coaching sessions for the club's junior section.[ref needed] She is the Head of Hockey at RGS Worcester.[ref]. She holds a Sports Science Degree from Liverpool John Moores University.

Walton once played football for Aston Villa L.F.C.

She was featured Diva Magazine's Visible Lesbian 100 in 2020.

== Club career ==
Walton began her club career at Bowdon Hightown before moving to Hampton-in-Arden Hockey Club and then Olton and West Warwickshire.

She currently plays for Gloucester City Hockey Club in the England Hockey Women's Hockey League Division 1 North, competing as a defender for the Ladies 1st XI.

== Coaching career ==
Walton is the Head of Hockey at Royal Grammar School Worcester, a position she has held since 2016. She also runs performance camps for junior players at Gloucester City Hockey Club.

She holds a Sports Science degree from Liverpool John Moores University.
