= Jack Adams (rugby union) =

English rugby player (1986–2021)

- Born: Jack Adams; 17 September 1986 Gloucester, England
- Died: 12 June 2021 (aged 34)
- Height: 6 ft 0 in (1.83 m)
- Weight: 15 st 2 lb (96 kg)
- School: St Peter's School

Rugby union career
- Position: Centre
- Current team: Moseley
Senior career
Years	Team	Apps	(Points)
2005–2009	Gloucester	17	(20)
2007–2009	Moseley (D-R)	30	(45)
2009–2011	Bristol		
2011–	Moseley		
National sevens team
Years	Team		Comps
- England Sevens

Jack Adams (17 September 1986 – 12 June 2021) was an English rugby union footballer, who last played for Chinnor RFC. He played at centre.

Adams made his Gloucester first-team debut against Sale Sharks at Kingsholm on 10 September 2005 (18 years old), he came on as a replacement for Mike Tindall. He tore his ACL shortly after and spent the rest of the 05/06 season in recovery, after finding out he had made the England U21s squad at age 18. After this long injury lay off, Adams started the 2006-07 Guinness Premiership with 2 tries in the first two home games of the season, they were both scored when he came on as a replacement. When Mike Tindall was away playing for England Adams replaced him, many times being man of the match, notably vs Wasps, Leicester Tigers & Newcastle Falcons all in the space of a few weeks. In total Adams scored 6 tries in all competitions during the 2006–07 season and set up countless others. During the 2007–08 and 2008–09 seasons, Adams was also dual-registered with Moseley, for whom he made many appearances, mostly at outside centre, and he also gained a cup winners medal as part of the EDF Energy Trophy winning side of 2009 and set up both tries. Adams played for England Sevens over three seasons from 2007 to 2009 travelling to Dubai, Adelaide, South Africa, Hong Kong, Edinburgh & Twickenham several times. He also played England Counties for two seasons running from 2012 to 2014 and was a remarkable addition to their program.

Adams joined Bristol Rugby in 2009 signing a two-year contract, after playing over 50 games for Bristol and winning the British & Irish Cup with them he was part of the squad who lost to Exeter in the Championship final. Adams then made the move to Moseley Rugby Club. The strong running centre badly broke his thumb vs Nottingham which kept him out for the remaining 14 games of the season. Due to this injury Adams had limited options moving into the 2012 season, but Cinderford RFC saw a chance and jumped at the ex Gloucester, Bristol & England 7s player. Adams then played for them for three seasons. He was their top try scorer in the 2013/14 season and was a huge part of their 2014/15 season survival.

Adams died on 12 June 2021 from cancer, at the age of 34.

== Honours ==
Gloucester Rugby Lv Cup Winners 2006

Premiership Finalist 2007

=== Moseley ===
- National Trophy: 2009

Bristol Rugby British & Irish Cup 2010 Winners

England Sevens 2007–2009

England Counties 2012–2014
