= Paul Fishwick =

British hockey player

Personal information
- Born: 21 August 1936 (age 89) Stoke-on-Trent, England
- Height: 174 cm (5 ft 9 in)
- Weight: 67 kg (148 lb)

Sport
- Sport: Field hockey
- Position: Goalkeeper
Senior career
Years	Team	Caps	Goals
1959–1969	Harborne	-	-
National team
Years	Team	Caps	Goals
–	Great Britain		-
–	England		-

Paul Darrell Fishwick (born 21 August 1936) is a British field hockey player who competed at the 1964 Summer Olympics.

== Biography ==
Fishwick was educated at Newcastle-under-Lyme School and studied at Cambridge University.

Fishwick played club hockey for Harborne Hockey Club and was selected for the 1960 Summer Olympics but ultimately did not play a game due to being the number two goalkeeper behind Harry Cahill. He represented Staffordshire at county level.

Fishwick represented Great Britain at the 1964 Olympic Games in Tokyo in the men's tournament.
