= Russell Anderson (field hockey) =

Scottish field hockey player

Personal information
- Born: 5 December 1984 (age 41) Chester, England

Sport
- Sport: Field hockey
- Position: Defender
Senior career
Years	Team	Caps	Goals
1999-2006	Chester	-	-
2006–2013	Brooklands	-	-
2013–2018	Cannock	-	-
2018–2021	Brooklands	-	-
2021–2025	Repton	-	-
National team
Years	Team	Caps	Goals
2010–2022	Scotland	100	(3)
Medal record
Representing Scotland
European Championship II
Bronze medal – third place	2015 Prague	Team
Gold medal – first place	2017 Glasgow	Team

Russell Anderson (born 5 December 1984) is a Scottish field hockey player who has represented Scotland at the 2018 Commonwealth Games.

== Biography ==
Anderson was born in Chester, England, and was educated at Cherry Grove Primary School and Christleton High School and studied Exercise and Nutrition at the University of Chester. Although born in England he had a Scottish family and made his debut against Ireland in the 2010 Celtic Cup.

He a bronze medal with Scotland at the 2015 Men's EuroHockey Championship II in Prague and won a gold medal with Scotland at the 2017 Men's EuroHockey Championship II in Glasgow.

He played club hockey for Brooklands and Cannock in the Men's England Hockey League. While at Cannock, he participated in the Commonwealth Games hockey tournament at the 2018 Commonwealth Games in Gold Coast, Australia.

Anderson retired from international hockey in October 2022 and as of 2025, he worked as a PE teacher and head of hockey at Repton Prep.
