= Michael Shaw (field hockey) =

Welsh field hockey player

Mike Shaw
Personal information
- Born: 21 September 1991 (age 34) Manchester, England

Sport
- Sport: Field hockey
- Position: Defender
Senior career
Years	Team	Caps	Goals
2011–2014	Sheffield Hallam	-	-
2014–2017	Bowdon	-	-
2018	Brooklands	-	-
National team
Years	Team	Caps	Goals
2011–2014	Wales	51	(2)

Michael Shaw (born 21 September 1991) is a former field hockey player who represented Wales. He competed for Wales at the 2014 Commonwealth Games.

== Biography ==
Shaw, born in Manchester, England, played club hockey for Sheffield Hallam and while at Sheffield in 2014, he was selected to represent the Welsh team at the 2014 Commonwealth Games in Glasgow, Scotland in the men's tournament.

He earned 51 caps for Wales and later played for Bowdon Hockey Club and Brooklands Hockey Club.
