= Craigclowan School & Nursery =

Location
- Edinburgh Road; Perth, PH2 8PS; Scotland; 56.371552°N 3.424934°W

Information
- Type: Preparatory school, Day school
- Motto: Laborare et ludere (Work and play)
- Established: 1952; 74 years ago
- Founder: Richard W Noad
- Head: Dougal Lyon
- Gender: Co-educational
- Age: 3 to 13
- Enrolment: 252 (2015)
- Website: www.craigclowan-school.co.uk

Craigclowan School & Nursery is a private day preparatory school for boys and girls aged 3 to 13 in Perth, Scotland.

== History ==
Craigclowan School and Nursery is located south of Perth.

Craigclowan was established in 1952 by Richard W Noad. Noad was educated at Sedbergh School and the University of Oxford, graduating with an MA in Philosophy, Politics and Economics (PPE). He was formerly second master at Ardvreck in Crieff. The school opened on 16 September 1952 with 36 pupils.

In May 1955 Noad bought Craigclowan with its extensive grounds from Isabella McArthur. Following the death of Noad in 1965, the parents and staff agreed to form a company, to take over and run the school. The company, with six governors and a chairman, bought Craigclowan from the Noads in 1965. Craigclowan School Limited continues to expand facilities and buy land to the present day.

In March 2018, Craigclowan announced a collaboration with the Chinese education company LUKEC to open nursery schools in mainland China using the name 'Craigclowan China', the first of which is planned to open in September 2018 in Beijing.

== Houses ==
There are four school houses, named after Scottish islands.

- Arran
- Harris
- Lewis
- Skye

== Notable alumni ==
- Jamie Cachia (born 1987), Scotland field hockey international.
- Graeme Connal (born 1969), winner of the 1991 and 2009 World Curling Championships with team Scotland.
- Phil Kay (born 1969), comedian.
