= Peter Marsh (field hockey) =

British hockey player

Personal information
- Born: 12 May 1951 (age 75) Dover, England
- Height: 180 cm (5 ft 11 in)
- Weight: 78 kg (172 lb)

Sport
- Sport: Field hockey
- Position: Forward
Senior career
Years	Team	Caps	Goals
1970–1981	Harborne	-	-
National team
Years	Team	Caps	Goals
–	Wales & Great Britain		-

Peter Richard James Marsh (born 12 May 1951) is a British former field hockey player who competed at the 1972 Summer Olympics.

== Biography ==
Marsh was born in Dover, England and educated at Millfield School. He chose to compete for Wales and made his debut aged just 18.

He lived in Redditch and represented Staffordshire at county level.

Marsh primarily played club hockey for Harborne Hockey Club. While at Harborne he competed in the men's tournament at the 1972 Olympic Games in Munich

He was selected for the Great Britain team for the 1980 Olympic Games in Moscow, but subsequently did not attend due to the boycott.
