= Harborne Hockey Club =

English field hockey club

- Full name: Harborne Hockey Club
- League: Men's England Hockey League; Women's Midlands Division
- Founded: 1903; 123 years ago
- Home ground: King Edward's School, Edgbaston, Birmingham

Harborne Hockey Club is a field hockey club that is based in Harborne, Birmingham. The club was founded in 1903. The club plays fixtures at the Eastern Road pitch of the King Edward's School, Birmingham (primarily men's fixtures) and the pitches of the King Edward VI High School for Girls (primarily women's fixtures). Matches are also held at the King Edward VI Five Ways School.

== Teams ==
The club runs multiple teams of all ages, including six men's teams with the first XI playing in the Men's England Hockey League Division One North (as of 2023/24). There are six women's teams with the first XI playing in the Midlands Hockey League. Additionally there are six junior teams, two vets teams and one mixed team. The club also hosts the Flyerz adults and juniors which are community teams for people with disabilities.

== History ==
The first recorded match was held in 1903 at the Harborne Cricket Club ground (which is also still the head office of the Hockey Club) on Church Avenue. In 1929, Frank Wainwright (a goalkeeper) was capped by England.

The club celebrated its 50th anniversary in 1953 by hosting a match against a Hockey Association XI.

Paul Fishwick participated in the men's tournament at the 1964 Summer Olympics and Peter Marsh competed in the men's tournament at the 1972 Summer Olympics.

The club started playing competitive league hockey in 1967 and the women's section was introduced during the 1983/4 season.

The Men's 1st XI played in the Poundstretcher National League Premier Division in the inaugural 1988-89 season, scoring the first ever National League goal, and then were relegated from the Premier Division in the 1989-90 season, and have not returned to the highest domestic division since.

The Men's 1st XI won England Hockey's Tier 1 Championship Cup (formerly known as the HA Cup) on the 17 May 2025, beating Indian Gymkhana 2-1 in the final during the 2024–25 season.

== Notable players ==
=== Men's internationals ===
Extended content

Player	Events|Notes	Ref
(Wales) Martin Brough	Oly (1980)	
(England) Paul Fishwick	Oly (1960, 1964)	
(England) Peter Marsh	Oly (1972)	
(Wales) Bryn Williams	CT (1978)	

Key

- Oly = Olympic Games
- CG = Commonwealth Games
- WC = World Cup
- CT = Champions Trophy
- EC = European Championships
