= Aaron Hinkley =

English rugby union player (born 1999)

- Born: Aaron Richard Hinkley; 29 March 1999 (age 27) Hereford, England
- Height: 1.83 m (6 ft 0 in)
- Weight: 105 kg (231 lb; 16 st 7 lb)
- School: St Peter's High School, Gloucester; Bromsgrove School
- University: Hartpury University

Rugby union career
- Position: Flanker
- Current team: Northampton Saints
Senior career
Years	Team	Apps	(Points)
2018–2020	Gloucester	13	(10)
2022–2022	Exeter Chiefs	4	(0)
2021–2022	→Coventry (loan)	7	(10)
2022–2023	Northampton Saints	4	(0)
2023-2025	Coventry RFC	23	(20)
- Correct as of 29 June 2022
International career
Years	Team	Apps	(Points)
2017	England U18	4	(5)
2018-2019	England U20	15	(15)
- Correct as of 26 January 2020

Aaron Richard Hinkley (born 29 March 1999 in Hereford, England) is an English professional rugby union player. He plays as a flanker for Coventry.

== Club career ==
Hinkley was a pupil at St Peter's High School, Gloucester, Bromsgrove School, and Hartpury University. He joined the Gloucester academy in the summer of 2017. He made his debut as a replacement for Ben Morgan in an Anglo-Welsh Cup game against Newcastle Falcons on 3 February 2018 and had a try disallowed for having a foot in touch. He made his Premiership debut, again as a replacement for Ben Morgan, against Exeter Chiefs on 24 November 2018. He was nominated for the 2019/20 Premiership Rugby Cup breakthrough player award after scoring a try against London Irish in the group stage.

It was announced on 2 March 2020 that Hinkley will be joining Exeter Chiefs for the 2020/21 season. On 31 May 2022, it was confirmed that Hinkley signed for Premiership rivals Northampton Saints following a successful trial from the 2022–23 season. On 23 March 2023 he was released from his Saints' contract.

== International career ==
Hinkley made a try-scoring debut for England under-18s against Scotland in March 2017. He also played on the under-18s' 2017 summer tour of South Africa.

Hinkley also scored a try on his debut for England under-20s in a bonus point win against Wales in the 2018 Six Nations Under 20s Championship. He was in the England squad for the 2018 World Rugby Under 20 Championship and appeared as a replacement in the defeat against France in the final. He played every minute of the 2019 Six Nations Under 20s Championship, winning two man of the match awards in the tournament and scoring a try against Scotland. He started every game of the 2019 World Rugby Under 20 Championship, scoring a try against Australia as England finished fifth.
