= Kirsty MacKay =

English field hockey player

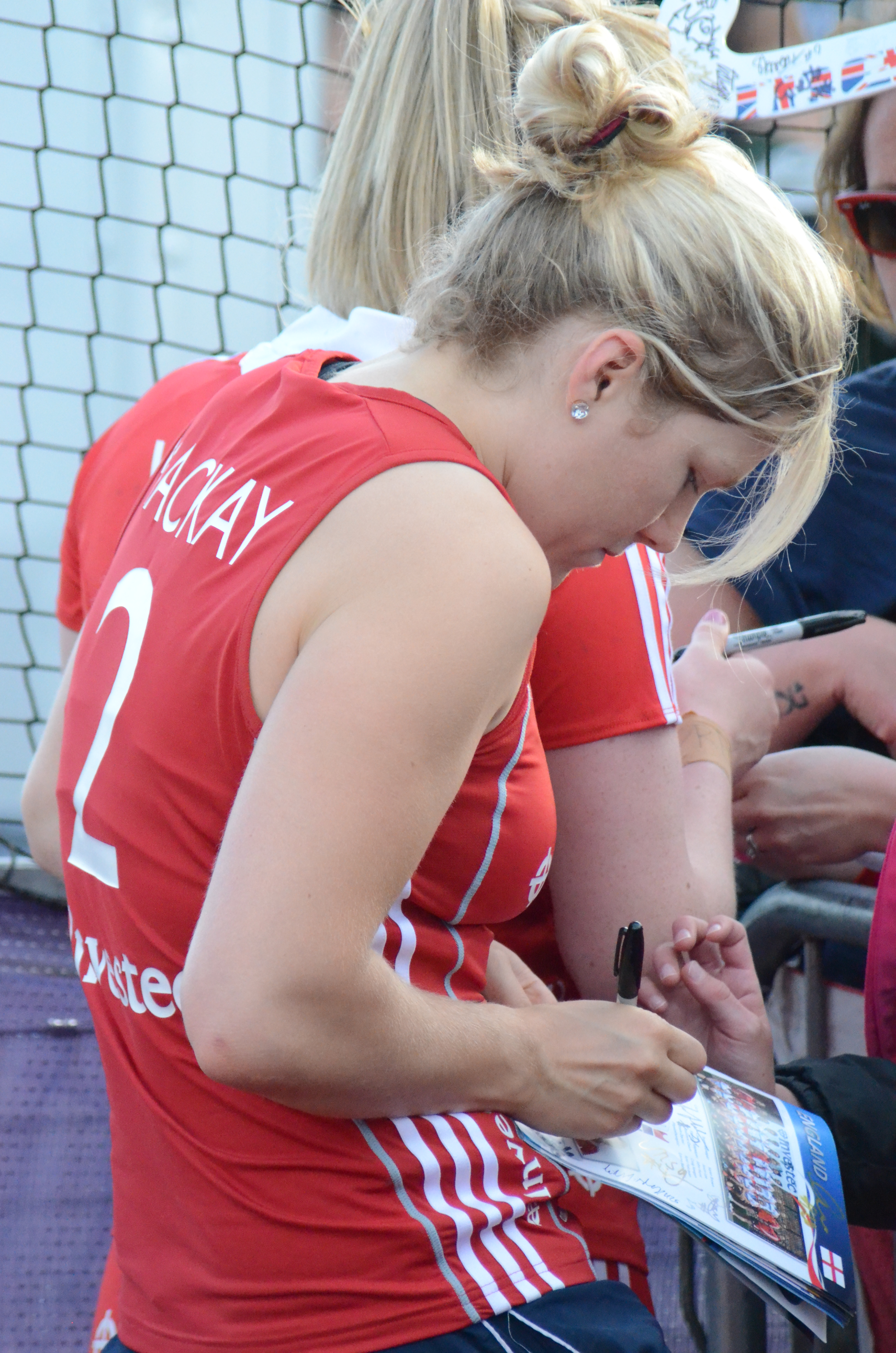

Personal information
- Born: 16 November 1986 (age 39) Blackpool, Lancashire, England
- Height: 1.72 m (5 ft 7 1/2 in)
- Weight: 71 kg (157 lb)

Sport
- Country: United Kingdom
- Sport: Field Hockey

Achievements and titles
- National finals: National team Years Team Apps 2013-2016 England 15 2009-2016 Great Britain 18

Kirsty MacKay (16 November 1986) is a goalkeeper for England national women's field hockey team. She plays club hockey in the Investec Women's Hockey League for Bowdon Hightown.

Mackay also played for East Grinstead, for four seasons helping them to gain promotion into the Premier League in 2014/15 for the first time in their history. Mackay also helped the team to become National Indoor Finals Champions - 2016, 2019, qualifying for the European Indoor Championships in both years.
