= Fiona Crackles =

England field hockey player (born 2000)

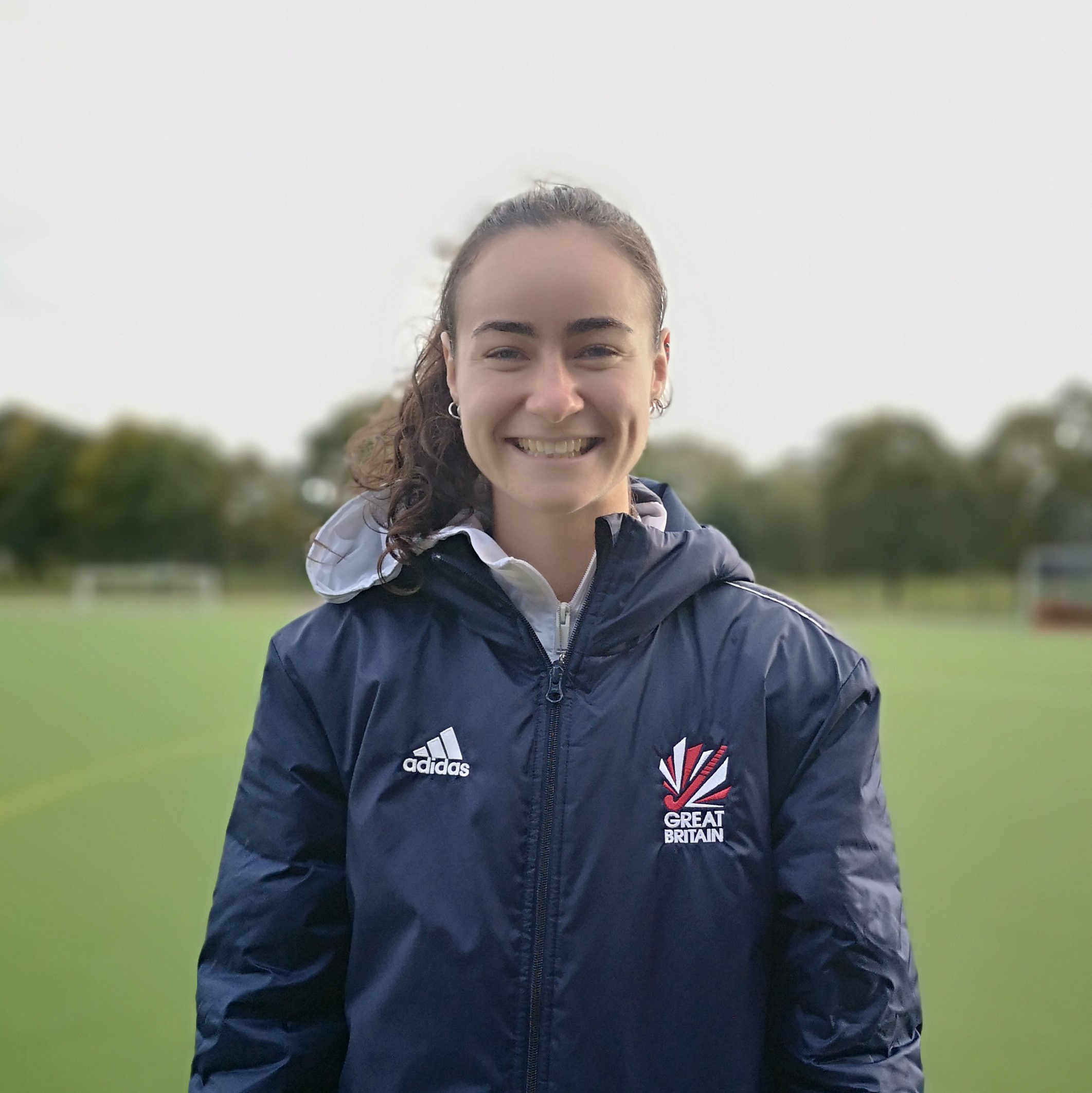
- Crackles in 2021

Personal information
- Full name: Fiona Anne Crackles
- Born: 11 February 2000 (age 26) Kirkby Lonsdale, Cumbria, England

Sport
- Sport: Field hockey
- Position: Midfielder or Defender
- Club: Durham University
Senior career
Years	Team	Caps	Goals
2014–2016	Lancaster Hockey Club	-	-
2016–2018	Ben Rhydding	-	-
2019–present	Durham University	-	-
2021-present	Wimbledon Hockey Club	-	-
National team
Years	Team	Caps	Goals
2021–present	England	5	(0)
2020–present	Great Britain	14	(0)
–	ENGLAND & GB TOTAL:	19	(0)
Medal record
Women's field hockey
Representing Great Britain
Olympic Games
Bronze medal – third place	2020 Tokyo	Team
Representing England
Commonwealth Games
Gold medal – first place	2022 Birmingham	Team
EuroHockey Junior Championship
Bronze medal – third place	2018 Santander
- Updated on 2 August 2021

Fiona Anne Crackles (born 11 February 2000) is an English field hockey player who plays as a midfielder for the England and Great Britain national teams.

== Early life ==
She was born 11 February 2000 in Kirkby Lonsdale, Cumbria. She attended Melling St. Wilfrid Primary school and Queen Elizabeth School in Cumbria.

== Club career ==
She plays club hockey in the Women's England Hockey League Division One North for Durham University.

She played overseas for the Queensland Under 21s in the National Championships in June 2019.

== International career ==
She competed in the 2020 Summer Olympics for Great Britain, receiving a bronze medal.
