= John W. Neill =

British field hockey player (1934–2019)

John Neill
Personal information
- Born: 15 May 1934 Frimley, England
- Died: 21 August 2019 (aged 85)
- Height: 184 cm (6 ft 0 in)
- Weight: 85 kg (187 lb)

Sport
- Sport: Field hockey
- Position: Full back
Senior career
Years	Team	Caps	Goals
1956–1958	Southgate	-	-
1958–1961	Army	-	-
1961–1971	Bowdon	-	-
National team
Years	Team	Caps	Goals
1960–1968	Great Britain		-
1958–1968	England		-

John Whitley Neill (15 May 1934 – 21 August 2019) represented Great Britain at three Olympic Games and was captain of the Great Britain Field Hockey team at the Mexico Olympics in 1968. He played 57 times for Great Britain between 1960 and 1968 (a record at the time).

== Biography ==
Born in Frimley, Surrey, England and was educated at Rugby School

Neill played club hockey for Southgate and made his debut for England in 1958 and toured South Africa the same year. He participated at the 1960 Olympics when playing for the Army at club level. After two years National Service in the Royal Artillery, Neill signed for Bowdon Hockey Club and represented Cheshire at county level 43 times.

Neill was at Bowdon when he received his second and third Olympic Games call ups.

Neill was also a Director of the family brewing and distilling company Greenall Whitley plc.
