= 2022 Masters Hockey World Cup =

Tournament details
- Venue(s): Nottingham Hockey Centre; Hartleyvale Stadium; Oi Hockey Stadium

The 2022 Masters Hockey World Cup an World Masters Hockey was a field hockey event. The event comprised a series of tournaments in both male and female competitions.

== Age Groups ==
Across both the men's and women's tournaments, a total five age groups were played:

=== 2022 World Cup: Nottingham ===
12 - 21 August 2022, Nottingham Hockey Centre, England

Men

- Over 35's
- Over 40's

Women

- Over 35's
- Over 40's

=== 2022 World Cup: Cape Town ===
1-10 October; Hartleyvale Stadium, Cape Town

Men

- Over 45's
- Over 50's
- Over 55's

Women

- Over 45's
- Over 50's
- Over 55's
- Over 60's
- Over 65's

=== 2022 World Cup: Tokyo ===
19 -29 October; Oi Hockey Stadium, Tokyo

Men

- Over 60's
- Over 65's
- Over 70's
- Over 75's
- Over 80's

== Venues ==
Following is a list of all venues and host cities.

2022 Masters Hockey World Cup is located in Earth	Nottingham	Cape Town	Tokyo
2022 Masters Hockey World Cup is located in Earth	Nottingham Hockey Centre	Hartleyvale Stadium	Oi Hockey Stadium
2022 Masters Hockey World Cup is located in Earth	Capacity: 1,600	Capacity: 3,000	Capacity: 15,000

== Results ==
=== 2022 World Cup: Nottingham ===
==== Men ====
Age group	Final			Third place match
Age group	Winner	Score	Runner-up	Third place	Score	Fourth place
Over 35's Details	England	1–0	South Africa	Ireland	6–3	Argentina
Over 40's Details	England	2–2 (3–1) penalty shootout	Australia	Ireland	1–0	Spain

==== Women ====
Age group	Final			Third place match
Age group	Winner	Score	Runner-up	Third place	Score	Fourth place
Over 35's Details	England	2–1	Ireland	Wales	1–0	Netherlands
Over 40's Details	England	2–0	Argentina	Czech Republic	3–1	Germany

=== 2022 World Cup: Cape Town ===
==== Men ====
Age group	Final			Third place match
Age group	Winner	Score	Runner-up	Third place	Score	Fourth place
Over 45's Details	Netherlands	3–0	Germany	England	4–2	South Africa
Over 50's Details	Netherlands	2–0	Germany	England	4–1	South Africa
Over 55's Details	Netherlands	2–0	England	Germany	1–1 (2–1 s.o.)	Wales
Over 55's SoM; Details	England	6–4	South Africa	Alliance SoM	2–0	Ireland

==== Women ====
Age group	Final			Third place match
Age group	Winner	Score	Runner-up	Third place	Score	Fourth place
Over 45's Details	Argentina	3–1	England	Germany	2–1	Netherlands
Over 50's Details	England	2–0	Argentina	Scotland	2–0	Germany
Over 55's Details	England	1–0	Scotland	Ireland	2–0	Netherlands
Over 60's Details	England	5–0	Scotland	Argentina	0–0 (1–0 s.o.)	Netherlands
Over 65's Details	England	2–0	Scotland	United States		England LX

=== 2022 World Cup: Cape Town ===
==== Men ====
Age group	Final			Third place match
Age group	Winner	Score	Runner-up	Third place	Score	Fourth place
Over 60's	Australia	2–1	England	Malaysia	3-1	Japan
Over 65's	Australia	4–1	Ireland	Japan	1–1 (4–3 s.o.)	Malaysia
Over 70's	Wales	2–0	South Africa	Australia	2–1	Japan
