= Jack Turner (field hockey) =

English field hockey player

Personal information
- Born: 26 March 1997 (age 29) Cookham Dean, Berkshire, England

Sport
- Sport: Field hockey
- Position: Forward
Senior career
Years	Team	Caps	Goals
2016–2020	Univ of Durham	-	-
2020–2026	Wimbledon	-	-
National team
Years	Team	Caps	Goals
2017-present	England	8	-
2016-2017	England U21	20	-
2015-2018	Great Britain U21	12	(1)

Jack Turner (born 26 March 1997) is an English international field hockey player who plays as a forward for England and Great Britain.

== Biography ==
Turner was educated at Sir William Borlase's Grammar School in Marlow, Buckinghamshire. He played for Maidenhead Hockey Club and Marlow Hockey Clubs.

He played for the Durham University Hockey Club when he received his first call up for England. He made his England debut in March 2017 playing four games in a tri-series against Germany and South Africa.

After Durham, Turner played his club hockey for Wimbledon Hockey Club in the Men's England Hockey League. He made his Great Britain debut in the 2022/23 FIH Pro League.
