= Walton High School, Nelson =

Walton High School
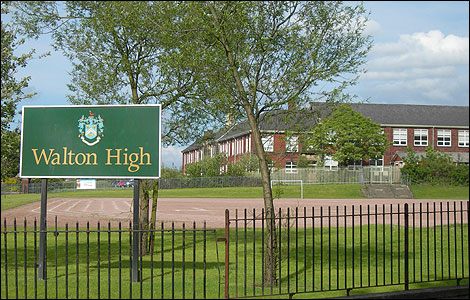

Location
- Oxford Road; Nelson, Lancashire, BB9 8JG; England

Information
- Type: Community
- Established: c.1920; 106 years ago Alumnus Hartley c1920–26
- Closed: 2007; 19 years ago
- Local authority: Lancashire County Council
- Department for Education URN: 134989 Tables
- Ofsted: Reports
- Gender: Coeducational
- Age: 11 to 16
- Colours: Green & Gold

Walton High School (formerly Nelson Grammar School prior to 1972) was located on Oxford Road, Nelson in Lancashire, England. The school existed between 1972 and 2006.

The school became Pendle Vale College in September 2006, and construction of the new building commenced July 2006. Construction was finished in time for the new term on 7 September 2008.

== History ==
The building had four different school names over its c.80 years. First, when the new building opened on Monday 14 October 1929, the school was known as Nelson Municipal Secondary School. In 1945, the named changed to Nelson Grammar School, then to Walton High School in 1972. Finally, in its last year as a building, the name changed to Pendle Vale College.

== Destruction ==
The Walton High School Complex had four buildings surrounded by a field and an all weather playing pitch. The school's main building hosted academic classes. The art and food building formerly stood to the left of the main building. Behind the main building were the science and French rooms.

Demolition of the Walton High complex began in December 2008 to make way for the new Pendle Vale College building, and was completed in January 2009.

== Alumni ==
=== Walton High School ===
- Khalil Ahmed, Headteacher, Fellow Royal Asiatic Society
- Jody Latham, actor in Shameless
- Nicola Wheeler, actress in Emmerdale
- Phil Woolas, Labour MP (Nelson Grammar 1970–1972, Walton High 1972–75)

=== Nelson Grammar School ===
- Prof Susan Birley, Professor of Entrepreneurship at Imperial College London from 1990 to 2003
- Christine Butler, Labour MP for Castle Point from 1997 to 2002
- Prof Brian Duerden, Professor of Medical Microbiology at Cardiff University since 1991
- Dr Derek Leaver FRSE (1929–1990) chemist
- Prof John Morton (neuroscientist) OBE, FRS, cognitive scientist
- Prof Barry T Pickup, Professor of Theoretical Chemistry at Sheffield University
- Sir John Oldham (health specialist), received an OBE for services to patients (2001) and awarded a knighthood for services to the NHS (2003)

=== Nelson Municipal Secondary School ===
- Sir Frank Hartley (pharmacist), Vice Chancellor, University of London, 1976 to 1978; attended from c.1920 to 1926
