= Brendan Creed =

English field hockey player

Personal information
- Born: 3 January 1993 (age 33) Solihull, England
- Height: 1.90 m (6 ft 3 in)
- Weight: 80 kg (176 lb)

Sport
- Sport: Field hockey
- Position: Defender
Senior career
Years	Team	Caps	Goals
2006–2010	Bowdon	-	-
2011–2015	Sheffield Hallam	-	-
2015–2016	Harvestehude	-	-
2016–2021	Surbiton	-	-
2021–2024	Beerschot	-	-
National team
Years	Team	Caps	Goals
2013–2014	England & GB U21	29	-
2017–2024	England & GB	93	(1)
Medal record
Men's field hockey
Representing England
EuroHockey Championship
Bronze medal – third place	2017 Amstelveen
Silver medal – second place	2023 Mönchengladbach
Commonwealth Games
Bronze medal – third place	2018 Gold Coast	Team
Bronze medal – third place	2022 Birmingham	Team
EuroHockey Junior Championship
Bronze medal – third place	2014 Waterloo

Brendan William John Creed (born 3 January 1993) is an English former field hockey player who played as a defender for the England and Great Britain national teams. He competed at the 2020 Summer Olympics.

== Biography ==
Creed played hockey in the Men's England Hockey League for Bowdon from 2006 to 2010 and Sheffield Hallam from 2011 to 2015. After one season away from England where he played for Men's Feldhockey Bundesliga German club Harvestehude he signed for Surbiton.

While at Surbiton from 2016 to 2021, he represented England and won a bronze medal at the 2018 Commonwealth Games in Gold Coast, played in the 2019 EuroHockey and appeared at the delayed 2020 Olympic Games in Tokyo.

Creed moved to play for Belgian club Beerschot for the 2021–22 season and won a bronze medal with England in the Men's tournament at the 2022 Commonwealth Games in Birmingham and won a silver medal with England at the 2023 Men's EuroHockey Championship in Mönchengladbach.

Creed retired from International hockey after missing selection for the 2024 Summer Olympics. One year later in 2025, he joined US Field Hockey as a high performance coach for the men's team after securing Level 1 and 3 certification and joined his wife Maddie Hinch in the United States.
