= Gavin Featherstone =

Field hockey coach

Gavin David Featherstone is a former hockey international player and field hockey coach from England.

He made his England debut in March 1977 at the Rank Xerox hockey tournament at Lords.

Featherstone coached the United States at the 1984 Olympics and South Africa at the 1996 Olympics. He joined Cornell University in 2012.
