= Derek Leaver (chemist) =

British chemist

- Born: 16 May 1929; Lancashire, England
- Died: 24 October 1990 (aged 61)
- Occupation: Chemist
- Spouse: Pam Goldman (m. 1960)
- Children: 4

Derek Leaver FRSE MRSC ARIC (16 May 1929 – 24 October 1990) was a British chemist.

== Life ==
Leaver was born on 16 May 1929 in Lancashire. He was educated at Nelson Grammar School then studied science at the University of Leeds graduating with a BSc in 1949. Leaver completed his postgraduate doctorate (PhD) in 1953. He then served two years National Service, 1953 to 1955.

In 1955, Leaver moved to Scotland to begin lecturing at the University of Edinburgh, and was promoted to Reader in 1972. He remained with the University until he retired. In 1962, Leaver oversaw the PhD of Dr David Vass.

In 1975, he was elected a Fellow of the Royal Society of Edinburgh. His proposers were Sir Edmund Langley Hirst, Neil Campbell, Sir John Cadogan, and Duncan Taylor.

Leaver died on 24 October 1990, following a long illness.

== Family ==
In 1960, he married Pam Goldman, with whom he had four sons.
