= Sheffield University Bankers Hockey Club =

English hockey club

- Founded: 2000
- Region: Yorkshire and North East Hockey
- Team history: Formed by a merger of the Sheffield Banker's Club and the Saturday teams of the University of Sheffield's hockey clubs.
- Based in: Sheffield, South Yorkshire, England
- Home ground: Norton Sports Centre
- Colours: Navy and White

Sheffield University Bankers Hockey Club is a hockey club based in Sheffield, South Yorkshire, England. It is associated with the University of Sheffield men's and women's hockey clubs, and many of its players are current students or alumni of the University of Sheffield. It is often abbreviated as SUBHC.

== History ==
Sheffield University Bankers Hockey Club was formed by a merger of the University of Sheffield Men & Women's hockey clubs' Saturday teams and the well-established Sheffield Bankers Hockey Club in 2000.

Sheffield Bankers Hockey Club was formed in 1927 by bank employees and originally played at Abbeydale Park. Membership rules were relaxed after World War II and the club grew significantly. When hockey pitches transitioned to astroturf in the 1980s, the club moved to the Concord Sports Centre before moving to the University of Sheffield facilities at Goodwin Sports Centre. In 2018, following the closure of the hockey pitches at Goodwin to make way for the university's new social sciences building, the club relocated to replacement facilities at the University of Sheffield's Norton Sports Centre.

In 2026, the Men's 1st XI won the 2025–26 Yorkshire and North East Hockey Men's Premier Division, securing promotion to the Men's England Hockey League where the team will compete in Conference North, the third tier of the League. The Men's 1st XI also won the Men's Tier 2 Trophy in the 2026 England Hockey Club Championships, beating Jersey 3–2 on shuffles after a 1–1 draw. The Men's 1st XI was named Open/Men's Team of the Year for the Yorkshire and North East area at the 2026 England Hockey Awards.

== Teams ==
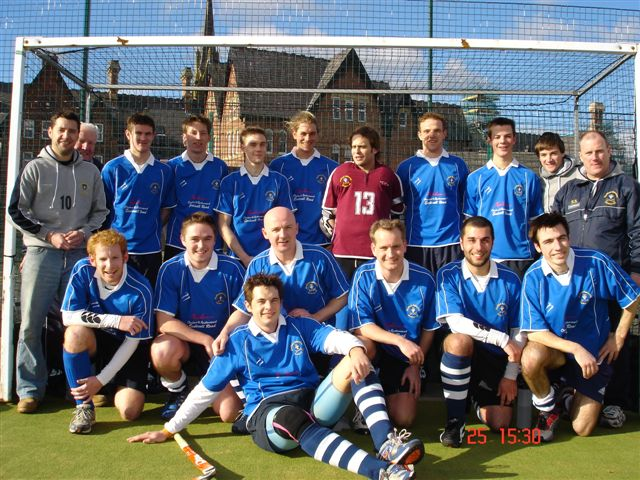
Men's 1st XI, 2005–06 season

The large club currently fields 7 Men's XIs and 4 Ladies' XIs, as well as a Juniors' development section re-established in 2024.

The Men's 1st XI play in the YNE Hockey Men's Premier Division, while the 2nd XI play in YNE Hockey Men's Division 1.

The Ladies' 1st XI play in the YNE Hockey Women's Division 1, while the 2nd XI play in YNE Women's Division 2.

== Club ==
The club plays most of its home games at the University of Sheffield's Norton Sports Centre, with some matches played at Meadowhead School. The club does not have its own clubhouse.
