= Pendle Forest Hockey Club =

English field hockey club

- Full name: Pendle Forest Hockey Club
- League: Women's England Hockey League
- Founded: 1967; 59 years ago
- Home ground: Pendle Vale College, Oxford Road
- Website: Official website

Pendle Forest Hockey Club is a field hockey club that is based at the Pendle Vale College, Nelson, Lancashire, England. The club was founded in 1967 and runs three women's teams in addition to various junior teams.

== History ==
The club was formed in 1967 as Nelson Ladies and played at the Nelson Cricket Club. The club played in the Lancashire Central Hockey League. The team trained at Mansfield High School, Lancashire in 1979.

In 1986 the club were the first to use the new all-weather floodlit facility at Pendle Leisure Centre in Colne and in 2000 a new astroturf pitch was laid as part of a £215,000 Pendle council scheme. After four decades as Nelson Ladies, the club were forced to move when the outdoor pitches were removed. They changed their name to the current name.

From 2018 the women's first team underwent an 87 game unbeaten run and won Team of the Year at the England Hockey awards.

The women's first XI were promoted to the Women's England Hockey League for the 2024–25 Women's England Hockey League season, following a successful campaign winning the Conference North league in 2023/24 and were shortlisted for Women's Team of the Year.
