= Broadwater School =

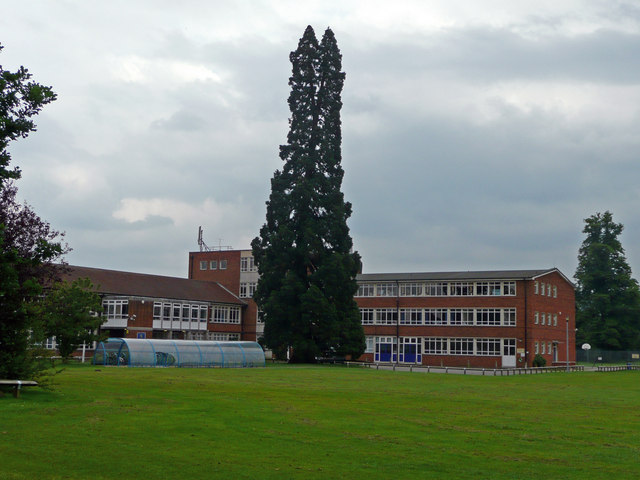
- Broadwater School pictured from the west, in May 2008

Location
- Summers Road; Farncombe, Surrey, GU7 3BW; England
- Coordinates: 51.201°N 0.594°W

Information
- Type: Academy
- Motto: By Increments Conquer
- Established: September 1967, initial first-year intake
- Local authority: Surrey County Council
- Trust: Greenshaw Learning Trust
- Ofsted: Reports
- Headteacher: Elizabeth Matthews
- Gender: 147935
- Age: 11 to 16
- Enrolment: c. 500
- Houses: Aquilla; Pegasus; Phoenix; Noctua
- Colour
- Website: www.broadwater.surrey.sch.uk

Broadwater School is a coeducational secondary school in the village of Farncombe, situated in the county of Surrey in England. Established as Broadwater County Secondary School the official opening was on Monday, 8 July 1968 [reference: Opening Programme]. The opening ceremony was performed by Chairman of Surrey County Council (Mr Louis A. White, J.P.) followed by a Prayer of Dedication by the Rector of Farncombe, Revd. E. R. Barnes. It has been a mixed comprehensive school since c.1970 and has approximately 600 students aged 11–16 years. Its main building has a multi-wing layout and between one and four floors. Elizabeth "Lizzi" Matthews succeeded Christopher Lee as Headteacher in 2017.

Previously a community school administered by Surrey County Council, in September 2020 Broadwater School converted to academy status. The school is now sponsored by the Greenshaw Learning Trust.

== Specialist staff ==
The school has Speech, Language and Communications Needs ('SCLN') and SEN departments to improve education for children who struggle in communication and in an educational setting respectively. SEN children are totally integrated into all aspects of the school community.

== Community resources ==
=== Academic, community group and charity group uses ===
The classrooms and specialist facilities such as the technology and food rooms are used for adult education. The assembly hall and classrooms may be hired at the school's discretion for fundraising or community group talks.

=== Music and performance ===
The school has internal and external concerts as the main centre for the South West Surrey Music Centre. Year groups arrange local and West End theatre trips and it has staged productions.

=== Sports ===
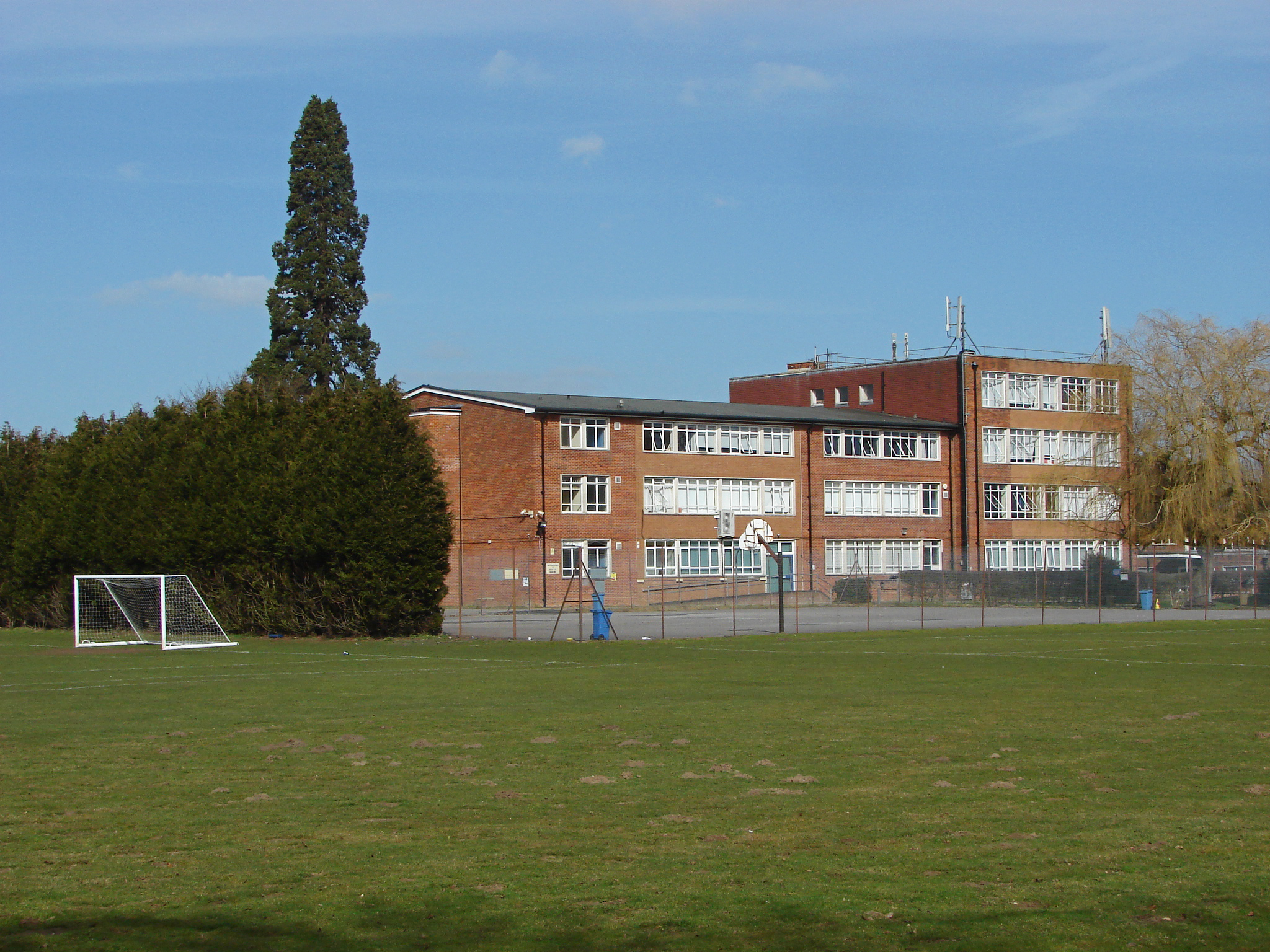
Broadwater School pictured from the east, in March 2015.

- Floodlit all-weather hockey pitch
- Netball pitch
- Tennis court
- Mainstream national sports pitches (rugby/football/cricket)
- Gymnasium and sports hall.

The school is the base of Guildford Hockey Club, the Premier Division hockey team, whose clubhouse is on the school site. Godalming rugby club adjoins the playing fields.

=== Other ===
A wildlife area is next to the lower school playground, used in school research.

== Assessment ==
The school was judged Good in 2012, under a reformed and more critical OFSTED inspection regime, the second highest category.

Depending on which of the main three subjects is analysed, results overall in 2012 were from the top to the 4th quintile (five equal groups) nationally.

Percentage of students achieving 5+ A*-C GCSEs (or equivalent) including English and maths	2010	2011	2012
School	56%	57%	51%
Local Authority	62%	63.5%	64.2%
England	53.5%	59%	59.4%

== Notable alumni ==
- Rikki Clarke (England cricketer)
- Mick Mills (Ipswich & England footballer)
