= Catherine De Ledesma =

English field hockey player

Personal information
- Born: 20 January 1999 (age 27)

Sport
- Sport: Field hockey
- Position: Forward
- Club: Loughborough Students
National team
Years	Team	Caps	Goals
2021–present	England	4	(1)
2021–present	Great Britain	0	(0)
–	ENGLAND & GB TOTAL:	4	(1)
Medal record
Women's field hockey
Representing England
- Updated on 11 June 2021

Catherine De Ledesma (born 20 January 1999) is an English field hockey player who plays as a forward for Loughborough Students and the England and Great Britain national teams.

== Club career ==
De Ledesma plays club hockey in the Women's England Hockey League Premier Division for Loughborough Students.

She has previously played for University of Birmingham, Wimbledon and Oxted.

== International career ==
De Ledesma has been part of the GB Elite Development Programme (EDP) and England U-21 set-ups for a number of years. She also captained England U18s.

She made her senior international debut for England against Italy on 6 June 2021, in the EuroHockey Championship 2021 Women. Where she scored on her debut from open play.

At the end of the 2024 season, Ledesma joined Hampstead & Westminster.
