= Repton Hockey Club =

English field hockey club

- Full name: Repton Hockey Club
- League: Men's England Hockey League; Women's England Hockey League
- Founded: 2016; 9 years ago
- Home ground: Repton Sports Centre, Willington Road
- Website: Official website

Repton Hockey Club is a field hockey club that is based in Repton, Derby, England. The club was founded in 2016. The club runs seven adult teams, 20 junior teams and 8 mini teams. The junior sections of the club are primarily associated with Repton School.

== History ==
The club was formed in May 2016 initially with the aim to coach juniors. However, after entering two senior teams in the Midlands Hockey League the women's first XI progressed through the divisions and gained promotion to the Women's England Hockey League after winning the 2024 Conference Midlands league. They then finished fourth in Division One North during the 2024–25 season.

The men's first XI then followed the women's team success by being promoted themselves to the Men's England Hockey League for the 2025–26 Men's England Hockey League season following a successful campaign winning the Midlands Conference league.

== Notable players ==
=== Men's internationals ===
Extended content

| Player | Events/Notes | Ref |
|---|---|---|
| (Scotland) Russell Anderson | 2021–2022 | |

Key

- Oly = Olympic Games
- CG = Commonwealth Games
- WC = World Cup
- CT = Champions Trophy
- EC = European Championships
