= Sheffield Hockey Club =

Field hockey club based in England

- Nickname(s): Sheffield Hallam
- League: Men's England Hockey League; North Hockey League
- Founded: 1898
- Home ground: Abbeydale Park, Dore, Yorkshire (Capacity 1000 Standing)

Personnel
- Captain: Ethan Chapman
- Coach: William Hearne
- Manager: Mark Beavis
- Website: www.sheffieldhockeyclub.com
Home	Away

Sheffield Hockey Club is a field hockey club based in Sheffield, South Yorkshire, England. The club is also known as Sheffield Hallam as a result of the partnership with Sheffield Hallam University.

== About ==
The men's 1st XI play in the Men's England Hockey League. The ladies' 1XI play in the North Hockey League. The club fields nine men's sides, five ladies' sides and junior sides based on a range of age groups.

The home ground at Abbeydale Park was established in 1919. There is a water-based pitch and clubhouse adjacent to a rugby and cricket pitch. The water-based pitch's (previously green) turf has been replaced with the donated blue turf that was used for field hockey at the London 2012 Olympics Queen Elizabeth Olympic Park.

== Teams ==
=== Current Men's 1st Team ===
No.	Pos.	Nation	Player
1	GK	ENG	Paul Hatton
10	DF	ENG	David Measom
5	DF	ENG	David Beckett
4	DF	ENG	Dylan Lim Hon
16	DF	ENG	Ethan Chapman(c)
7	MF	ENG	William Hearne
6	MF	ENG	Cameron Down
13	MF	ENG	Matt Godden
8	MF	ENG	Sam Tomlinson
11	MF	ENG	Nick Hale
3	MF	ENG	Joe Kopka
20	MF	ENG	Jack Simpkins
9	FW	ENG	Ben Stoney
12	FW	ENG	Oliver Ashdown
18	FW	ENG	Akshay Ahitan
17	FW	ENG	Miles King
19	FW	ENG	Taylor Bland

== Honours ==
Men

- 2017/2018 Yorkshire Cup Runners Up
- 2018/2019 Yorkshire Cup Runners Up
- 2019/2020 Yorkshire Cup Runners Up

== Notable players ==
=== Men's internationals ===
Extended content

Player	Events	Notes/Ref
(England) Liam Ansell		
(Scotland) Gavin Byers	2013–2014	
(Scotland) Jamie Cachia	CG (2014)	
(Wales) Dafydd Charles		
(England) Brendan Creed		
(Wales) Gareth Furlong	CG (2014)	
(England) David Goodfield		
(Wales) Rhys Gowman	CG (2014)	
(Wales) Alex Humphries		
(Scotland) William Marshall	CG (2014)	
(England) Phil Roper		
(Wales) Michael Shaw	CG (2014)	
(England) Tom Sorsby	Oly (2024)	

Key

- Oly = Olympic Games
- CG = Commonwealth Games
- WC = World Cup
- CT = Champions Trophy
- EC = European Championships
