= East Grinstead Hockey Club =

English field hockey team

- Founded: 1897
- League: Men's England Hockey League; Women's England Hockey League; London Hockey League; South League
- Based in: East Grinstead, West Sussex, England
- Home ground: Saint Hill
- Colours: White shirt, Navy shorts/skorts, White socks (Home); Navy shirt, White shorts/skorts, Navy socks (Away)
- Chairman: Chris Vallis-Wilson
- Captain: Dan Faulkner, Courtney Hansford

East Grinstead Hockey Club is a professional field hockey club based in East Grinstead, West Sussex, England. It is one of the most successful clubs in the United Kingdom with National League Outdoor and Indoor honours. It was founded in 1897. The home ground is at EGSC, near Saint Hill. The club has a water-based pitch with seats for the spectators as well as a 3G Hockey/Football pitch and clubhouse. The stadium is named Saint Hill.

The Men's 1st XI play in the Men's England Hockey League and the Women's 1st XI play in the Women's England Hockey League. The club currently fields five men's teams, four women's teams and respective youth development teams. The men's team have been champions of England on four occasions (1984–85, 1985–86, 2008–09, 2009–10) and the women's team have been champions of England on one occasion.

Every three years, the club hosts the Jacques Paloume tournament.

== History ==
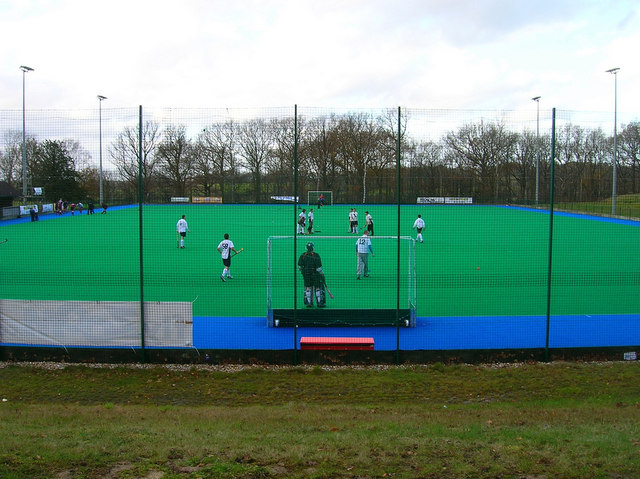
East Grinstead Sports Centre in 2007

EGHC Men's 1st Team first EHL title came in 1983, they then won the National Indoor Hockey League in 1986. In 2006 the men's Indoor squad were the National Indoor Champions, so that the 2006/7 season saw East Grinstead competing in Europe for the first time in many years. The Club represented England at the European Indoor Champions Trophy in Brussels, winning Silver medals, and securing promotion to the A Division of the Indoor Championship next season. In 2007 the indoor squad became National Indoor League Champions for the first time in their history, and finished runners up in the National Indoor Championship.

In the 2006/07 season the 1st XI finished 4th in the English Hockey League and were finalists in the EH National Cup for the second successive season. In order to gain experience of playing in a more competitive environment the men's 2nd XI and 3rd XI both made their debut in the London Higgins League, with the 2nd XI finished in top half of the Premier Division, while the 3rd XI entered the League in Division 2 and won promotion to Division 1 by finishing second. The U21 boys were Sussex Champions for the 4th year running; the Men's 2s and the Vets both won the Sussex Cup. Five of the 1st team squad and the team manager were selected to take part in the inaugural GB Super Leagues at the end of the season. EGHC won the BBC South East Club of the Year Award.

In 2008 EG successfully defended their National Indoor League title, were finalists in the English National Cup in 2006 and 2007 and obtained their highest ever placing in the English Hockey League in 2007/08 as runners-up meaning that they qualified for Euro Hockey League. In 2009 the 1st XI won the English Hockey League for the second time, they won the National Indoor Hockey League and also got to the last 8 of the European outdoor finals. They retained both their crowns and added the European Indoor Trophy after winning the competition for the first time in their history, but unfortunately got knocked out of the last 16 in the European outdoor finals.

The club was awarded England Hockey 'Club of the Year' in 2009 and is in the shortlisted for 2023. They competed in the National Indoor Finals 2011 as reigning champions and retained their crown after only losing 1 of 10 games and winning the rest on the way to the final at Wembley Arena, they beat Beeston 8-5 in the final. In the 2010-11 season outdoor season, despite dominating the league, they lost in the championship play off final to Beeston 2-1, in the Euro Hockey League they got knocked out in the Last 16 to rivals Reading HC.

The Women's 1st XI have been Sussex Premier Division champions on several occasions, and also won the EH Vase in 2009. They won promotion from the South Club's Women's Hockey League Division 3B to Division 2 in 2010/11, from Division 2 to Division 1 in 2011/12, to the National League East Conference in 2012/13 and to the Premier League in 2014/15 for the first time in their history.

The club mourned the death of Dennis Leman who died on 12 August 2010, he was a key figure in promoting EGHC status into what it is today. He was the EGHC president from 1972–1977 and was captain of the 1st XI side from 1952- 1962. EG also mourned the death of Frank Farrell who died on 3 June 2010. He was president of the Sussex Hockey Association between 1983–1993 and also managed Lewes HC for many years but was a frequent visitor to EGHC.

During the 2020–21 Women's Hockey League season, the women's team led the Premier Division before it was cancelled due to COVID-19 pandemic but the team gained consolation by defeating Clifton Robinsons 5-3 in the final of the Women's Championship Cup. The success continued during the 2022–23 Women's England Hockey League season when the women won their first ever title after beating Surbiton 3–2 in the play off final.

== Players ==
=== Men's First Team Squad 2025–26 season ===
- 1. Olly Smart (goalkeeper)
- 6. Fergus Jackson
- 7. James Smith
- 8. Samuel Knight
- 9. Jonty Elmes
- 10. Joseph Farmer
- 11. Joseph Roberts
- 12. Oliver Baxter
- 14. Bradley Read
- 15. Simon Faulkner
- 18. Kurt Lovett
- 20. Malachi Hayes
- 22. Ross Stott
- 23. Stephen Perry
- 27. Josh Barrott
- x. Daniel Faulkner (captain)

=== Women's First Team Squad 2025–26 season ===
- 1. Mila Welch (goalkeeper)
- 3. Beth Alexander
- 4. Sally Sime
- 5. Alexandra Malzer
- 6. Amy Thompson
- 7. Millie Giglio
- 9. Courtney Hansford (captain)
- 11. Carlota Gómez
- 12. Lily Walker
- 13. Elena Rayer
- 16. Rowena Hearn
- 17. Chloe Brown
- 24. Julia Balcerzak
- 31. Grace Balsdon
- x. Biba Mills
- x. Amelie Carter

== Men's first team honours ==
- EHL Premier Division Champions - 1984/85, 1985/86, 2008/09, 2009/10
- EHL Premier Division Play Off Runners Up - 1989/90, 2007/08, 2010/11, 2011/12, 2013/14, 2014/15
- EHL National Cup Winners - 1983/84
- EHL National Cup Runners Up - 2005/06, 2006/07
- European Indoor Trophy Champions - 2010, 2013
- National Indoor Finals Champions - 1986, 1992, 2004, 2005, 2008, 2009, 2010, 2011, 2012, 2013, 2014, 2015, 2017, 2018
- National Indoor League Champions - 2007, 2008, 2009, 2010, 2011, 2012, 2014, 2015, 2016
- Men's Vets National Plate Winners - 2010
- Euro Hockey League Participants - 2008/09, 2009/10, 2010/11, 2011/12, 2012/13, 2014/15, 2015/16

== Women's first team honours ==
- EHL Premier Division Champions - 2022–23
- Women's Championship Cup winners - 2020-21
- EHL East Conference Champions - 2014/15
- South Club's Women's Hockey League Division 1 Champions - 2012/13
- South Club's Women's Hockey League Division 2 Champions - 2011/12
- South Club's Women's Hockey League Division 3B Champions - 2010/11
- Indoor Team of the Year - 2010
- EH Vase Winners - 2009 & 2010
- National Indoor Finals Champions Women - 2016, 2019, 2024, 2025
- European Indoor Tier 2 Champions - 2023, 2025

== Notable players ==
=== Men's internationals ===
Extended content

Player	Events	Notes/Ref
(England) Liam Ansell	CG (2018), WC (2018)	
(England) Scott Ashdown		
(England) Nick Bandurak		
(England) Stephen Batchelor	Oly (1992)	
(Trinidad and Tobago) Kwandwane Browne		
(England) Andy Bull	2014–2015	
(England) Nicholas Catlin		
(South Africa) Gareth Carr		
(England) Darren Cheesman		
(England) Robert Clift	Oly (1992), WC (1990)	
(England) David Condon	Oly(2016), CG (2014, 2018), WC (2014, 2018)	
(Wales) Rick Gay		
(England) Mark Gleghorne	CG (2014), WC (2014)	
(England) Chris Griffiths	CG (2018)	
(Germany) Mats Grambusch		
(England) Danny Hall		
(Germany) Martin Häner		
(England) Adamson Harper		
(Wales) George Harris		
(England) Stuart Head	CG (1998)	
(England) Ashley Jackson	Oly (2008, 2012), CG (2014), WC (2014)	
(Wales) David Kettle	2011–2014	
(England) Glenn Kirkham	Oly (2008, 2012), WC (2010)	
(England) Jason Lee	Oly (1992)	
(England) Richard Leman	Oly (1984, 1988), WC (1982, 1986, 1990)	
(England) Iain Lewers	Oly (2012), WC (2014)	
(England) David Luckes	Oly (1992, 1996), CG (1998), WC (1994, 1998)	
(England) Barry Middleton	Oly (2012)	
(Wales) Joe Naughalty	2012–2016 & 2019–2021	
(England) Mark Pearn		
(England) Richard Potton		
(Wales) Lewis Prosser	CG (2022)	
(England) Patrick Smith		
(England) Rhys Smith		
(Scotland) Niall Stott	CG (2010, 2014)	
(Scotland) Ross Stott	CG (2014)	
(South Africa) Dylan Swanepoel		
(England) Ian Taylor	Oly {1984, 1988), WC (1986), CT (1984,85,86,87,88)	

Key

- Oly = Olympic Games
- CG = Commonwealth Games
- WC = World Cup
- CT = Champions Trophy
- EC = European Championships

=== Women's internationals ===
Extended content

Player	Events	Notes/Ref
(England) Grace Balsdon		
(England) Sophie Bray		
(Republic of Ireland) Chloe Brown		
(England) Millie Giglio		
(England) Rosie Hope		
(England) Tess Howard		
(England) Kirsty MacKay		
(England) Alex Malzer		
(England) Ellie Rayer		
(England) Laura Roper		
(New Zealand) Liv Shannon		
(England) Lily Walker		
(England) Mila Welch		
(Malaysia) Farah Yahya		

Key

- Oly = Olympic Games
- CG = Commonwealth Games
- WC = World Cup
- CT = Champions Trophy
- EC = European Championships

== Individual honours ==
- Ashley Jackson - World Young Player of the Year Award 2009
- Barry Middleton - Captain of England & GB
- England Hockey 'Club of the Year' 2009
