= Alex Malzer =

English field hockey player

Alexandra Malzer
Personal information
- Born: 19 August 2000 (age 25) England

Sport
- Sport: Field hockey
- Position: Midfielder
- Club: East Grinstead Hockey Club
National team
| Years | Team | Caps | Goals |
| 2019– | England | 0 | (0) |
| 2019– | Great Britain | 2 | (0) |
Medal record
Women's field hockey
Representing England

Alexandra Malzer also referred to as 'Malzer' (born 18 August 2000) is an English international field hockey player who plays as a midfielder for England and Great Britain.

She was educated at Ardingly College. She played club hockey in the British Universities and Colleges Sport (BUCS) league for the University of Nottingham.

Alex previously represented the England U16 and U18 national side winning a European bronze with the U18 team in the summer of 2018.

Malzer has also played for East Grinstead.
