= St Peter's High School, Gloucester =

St Peter's RC High School and Sixth Form Centre

Location
- Stroud Road; Gloucester, Gloucestershire, GL4 0DD; England; 51°49′43″N 2°14′43″W

Information
- Type: Academy
- Religious affiliation: Roman Catholic
- Established: 1964
- Local authority: Gloucestershire
- Department for Education URN: 136982 Tables
- Ofsted: Reports
- Chair of Governors: Mr Kofi Obbeng
- Headteacher: Mr Daniel Leiblich
- Gender: Coeducational
- Age: 11 to 18
- Enrolment: 1,642
- Colours: bottle green and yellow
- Motto: Faith and Learning in Pursuit of Excellence
- Website: http://www.sphs.uk.com

St Peter's High School and Sixth Form Centre is a Roman Catholic academy school and sixth form centre, on Stroud Road in the Tuffley area of Gloucester, England. The Headteacher (since September 2026) is Mr Daniel Leiblich. The main feeder schools are St. Peter's Catholic Primary School, St Mary's Churchdown, The Rosary School, Stroud and St Joseph's Primary School, Nympsfield.

== Notable alumni ==
- Jack Adams, rugby union player
- Jody Gooding, Great Britain Beach Volleyball
- Bridget Christie, comedian, actress and writer
- Adam Eustace, rugby union player
- Marcel Garvey, rugby union player
- Aaron Hinkley, rugby union player
- Ryan Lamb, rugby union player
- Mary-Jess Leaverland, singer and winner of a Chinese version of The X Factor
- Charlie Sharples, rugby union player
