= Durham University Hockey Club =

University sports team

- League: Men's England Hockey League; Women's England Hockey League; British Universities and Colleges Sport
- Home ground: Maiden Castle Sports Centre, Stockton Road, Durham DH1 3SE

Personnel
- Manager: Gareth Weaver-Tyler and Claire Dobison-Lee

Affiliation
- University: Durham University
- Website: www.dur.ac.uk/teamdurham/performance/universitysport/clubs/hockey/
| Home | Away |

Durham University Hockey Club is a field hockey club that is based at Durham University. The club's home ground is at the Maiden Castle Sports Centre in Durham. The club runs five men's teams, with the first XI playing in the Men's England Hockey League, and five women's teams, with the first XI playing in the Women's England Hockey League.

== Coaches ==
As of 2021, the club is coached by Gareth Weaver-Tyler and Claire Dobison-Lee. Durham graduate and Scottish international Jamie Cachia was previously part of the coaching staff.

Gavin Featherstone, a Durham alumnus and former England international who had coached the United States at the 1984 Olympics and South Africa at the 1996 Olympics, led the Durham coaching team from 2003. His period in charge saw an improvement in club fortunes, with the men participating in the National Hockey League for the first time. He eventually joined Cornell University in 2012.

== Ladies First Team Squad 2025–26 season ==
- 7. Lizzy Pocknell (captain)
- 9. Elizabeth Gibbins
- 10. Scarlett Spavin
- 11. Katie Birch
- 12. Ava Wadsworth
- 13. Katie Rimmer
- 14. Emmie Gilbert
- 18. Laura Cottee
- 19. Amelie Hales
- 21. Helena Youmans
- 22. Lorna Crawford
- 28. Evelyn Wilson
- 31. Amelia Tait
- 34. Ava Findlay
- 36. Darcy Littlefield
- 43. Rebecca Birch
- 44. Ffion Horrell (goalkeeper)

== Notable players ==
=== Men's internationals ===
Extended content

| Player | Events/Notes | Ref |
|---|---|---|
| (Scotland) Jamie Cachia | 2006–2010 | |
| (Scotland) Dan Coultas | EC (2011) | |
| (England) Ollie Payne | | |
| (England) Rhys Smith | | |
| (England) Jack Turner | 2017 debut | |
| (England) Jack Waller | | |

Key

- Oly = Olympic Games
- CG = Commonwealth Games
- WC = World Cup
- CT = Champions Trophy
- EC = European Championships

=== Women's internationals ===
Extended content

| Player | Events/Notes | Ref |
|---|---|---|
| (England) Fiona Crackles | | |
| (England) Tessa Howard | | |
| (Wales) Isabelle Howell | | |

Key

- Oly = Olympic Games
- CG = Commonwealth Games
- WC = World Cup
- CT = Champions Trophy
- EC = European Championships
