= Doncaster Hockey Club =

English field hockey club

- League: Men's England Hockey League; North Hockey League
- Home ground: Doncaster Town Field Sports Club, Doncaster
- Website: www.doncasterhockeyclub.co.uk

Doncaster Hockey Club is a field hockey club based in Doncaster, South Yorkshire, England. The home ground is at the Doncaster Town Field Sports Club.

The men's 1XI play in the Men's England Hockey League. The ladies' 1XI play in the North Hockey League. The club is one of the largest clubs in the North of England, and fields seven men's sides, four ladies' sides and various other sides.

Doncaster have been part of the National League since its inception and have had relative success in it. The men's 1st XI were relegated in 2012/13 but returned to the National League a season later. The Men's 1st XI reaching the EH Cup Final in 2010/11, narrowly losing out to Beeston, and achieving promotion to the EH National Indoor Premier Division in 2011/12 by finishing second in Division One, behind Loughborough.

The ladies' 1st XI reached the quarter-finals of the Ladies' Cup in 2011/12. The ladies 1st XI had been part of the National League for twenty-two years, since its inception, until their relegation in 2013/14 season. In Junior hockey Doncaster regularly compete both outdoor and indoor in cup competitions, and in 2011/12 reached the second tier of the under 16 Championships outdoors for both boys and girls.

Doncaster as well as having teams in the National League also has teams in Men's Conference North and Yorkshire Hockey Leagues. It has similar teams in the ladies leagues. Thus it has 6 men's teams and 5 ladies, making it one of the largest hockey clubs in Yorkshire.

== Major Honours ==
- 2010-11 Men's National Cup Runner-Up

== Internationals past and present ==
- W Chapman - Scotland
- Jo Ellis - England & Great Britain
- Barry Middleton - England & Great Britain
