= Pendle Vale College =

Coordinates: 53.8432°N 2.1946°W

Location
- Oxford Road; Nelson, Lancashire, BB9 8JG; England

Information
- Type: Community
- Motto: Think Pendle Vale, Think Achievement
- Established: 2006
- Local authority: Lancashire County Council
- Department for Education URN: 134989 Tables
- Ofsted: Reports
- Head teacher: Oliver Handley
- Gender: Coeducational
- Age: 11 to 16
- Enrolment: 1042
- Colour: Yellow Blue
- Website: http://www.pendlevale.lancs.sch.uk

Pendle Vale College is a mixed 11 to 16 comprehensive school located in Nelson, Lancashire.

== History ==
The school initially opened in 2006 as part of the first wave of Building Schools for the Future, occupying the site of the former Walton High School. New buildings were completed two years later.

The current headteacher is Oliver Handley, who was appointed in 2020.

The school's facilities include Information and communications technology rooms, a sports centre with climbing wall, multi-gym and all-weather pitches, music studios, and dance and drama suites.
