= Gloucester City Hockey Club =

Field hockey club in Gloucester, England

- League: Women's England Hockey League; Men's West Hockey League
- Founded: 1897; 129 years ago
- Home ground: Oxstalls Sports Park, Plock Court, Longford
- Website: gloucestercityhockey.co.uk

Gloucester City Hockey Club is a field hockey club based in Gloucester, England, founded in 1897. The club home venue operates from two home venue is Oxstalls Sports Park at Plock Court, Longford. The club runs five women's teams, four men's teams, and a comprehensive junior section. The Ladies' 1st XI competes in the Women's England Hockey League Division One North, while the Men's 1st XI plays in the West Hockey League.

== History ==
Gloucester City Hockey Club was founded in 1897, making it one of the oldest hockey clubs in the West Country. The club has grown from its origins to operate nine senior teams and a thriving junior section across multiple age groups.

In the 2024–25 season, the Ladies' 1st XI achieved their best-ever league finish, placing fifth in the Women's England Hockey League Division One North.

== Notable players ==
- Sally Walton – Olympic bronze medallist (2012 London Olympics),

 Great Britain international. 
 Walton plays for the Ladies' 1st XI and leads performance coaching sessions 
 for the club's junior players.[4]

== Junior section ==
The club runs a junior development programme for players from the age of eight, with squads organised by age group and gender: Mixed U8 and U10, and boys' and girls' squads at U12, U14, U16, and U18 levels. Training sessions are held at Plock Court and The King's School, Gloucester.

The club also runs holiday performance camps and coaching sessions, with visiting coaches including Olympic medallist Sally Walton.

== Teams ==
=== Women's section ===
The club fields five women's teams. The Ladies' 1st XI competes in the Women's England Hockey League Division One North, with lower teams playing in regional Gloucestershire leagues.

=== Men's section ===
The club has four men's teams. The Men's 1st XI plays in the West Hockey League Division 1 North, with lower teams competing in the West Open Men's Cotswold Divisions.
