= Nottingham Hockey Centre =

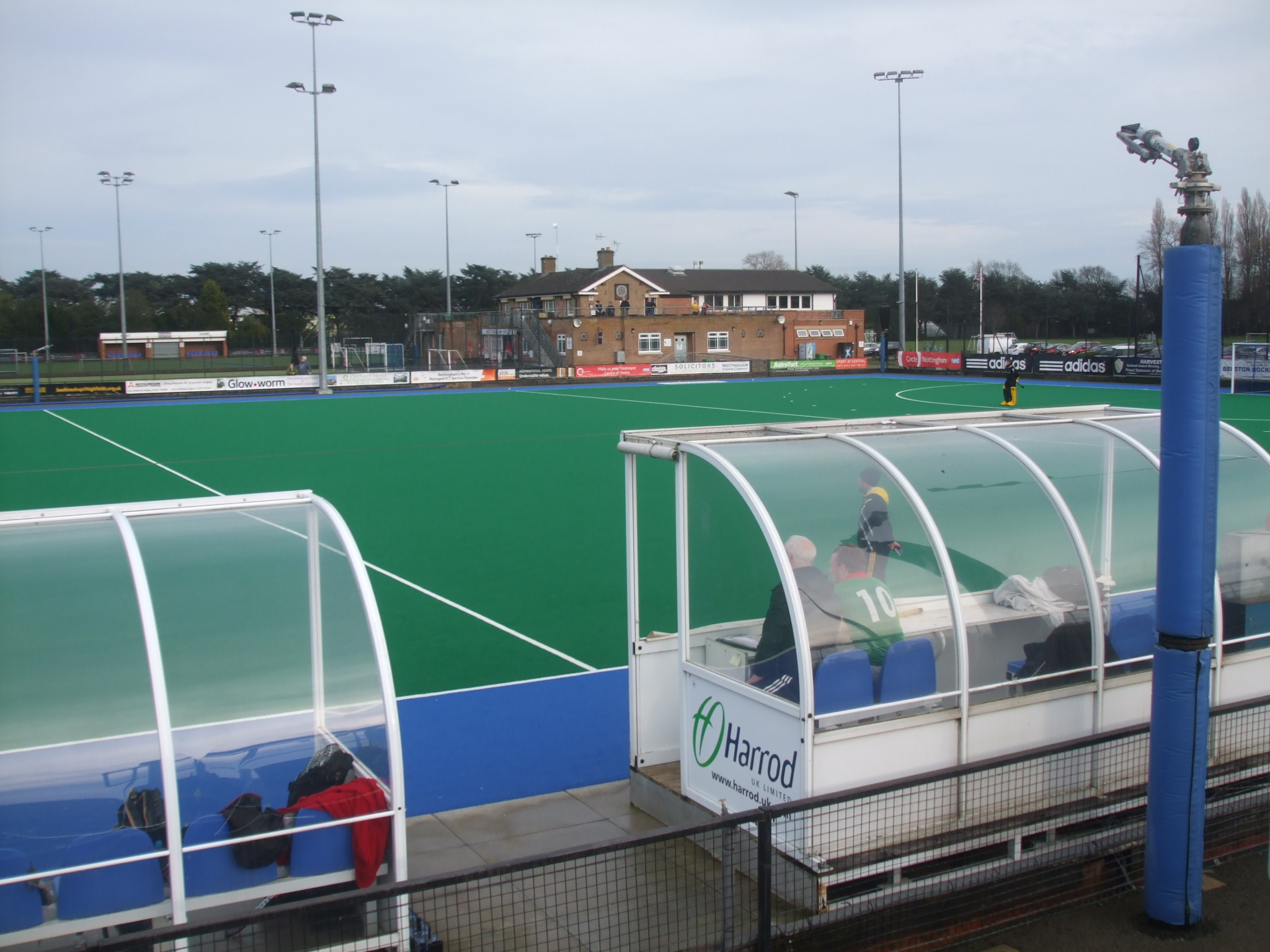
- Location: Highfields Parks, University Boulevard, Nottingham, NG7 2PS
- Coordinates: 52°55′59.59″N 1°11′44.34″W
- Owner: Nottingham Hockey Centre Ltd

Construction
- Expanded: 2020

Website
- www.nottinghamhockeycentre.com

Nottingham Hockey Centre previously called the Highfields Hockey Centre (and Highfields Sports Club originally), is a sports venue located in Nottingham. It is the premier field hockey venue in the Midlands and is one of the biggest hockey facilities in Europe.

The centre has six pitches consisting of the original four pitches (two nylon waterbase pitches, one sand dressed pitch and one half sized sand based pitch) and the two new blue Tiger Turf hockey pitches built by Nottingham High School in 2020. The clubhouse includes 16 changing rooms and hospitality including a conference room and an area called the Stick and Pitcher Bar. The Centre is adjacent to the Highfields Sports Complex, owned by the University of Nottingham and includes grass football and rugby pitches, a cricket pitch and volleyball courts.

The remaining founding sports clubs of the Hockey Centre are Beeston Hockey Club and Nottingham Players Hockey Club. The hockey centre is also shared by the University of Nottingham Hockey Club and Nottingham High School.

The centre is built on Highfields Park, which was land bequeathed in the 1920s by Jesse Boot, 1st Baron Trent (a former Nottingham High School pupil). The centre was originally called the Highfields Hockey Centre but through collaboration of the clubs the site has grown in size and is now known as the Nottingham Hockey Centre.

== Major events ==
In 2010, Nottingham Hockey Centre (then Highfields Sports Club), hosted the Women's Hockey Champions Trophy.

In 2022, the centre will host the Masters Hockey World Cups.
