= Swansea Hockey Club =

Field hockey club based at Swansea University

- League: Women's England Hockey League; Men's Verde Recreo Hockey League
- Founded: 2018; 8 years ago
- Home ground: Swansea University's International Sports Village

Swansea Hockey Club is a field hockey club based at Swansea University. The club was founded in 2018 following a merger between Swansea University Men's Hockey Club, Swansea University Ladies Hockey Club, Swansea City and Spartans. The Swansea University team had been founded in 1920 as one of the university's founding sports.

The club runs nine women's teams (including 3 University teams) with the first XI playing in the Women's England Hockey League Division One North and nine men's teams (including 3 University teams) with the first XI playing in a lower league called the Men's Verde Recreo League.

== Notable players ==
=== Men's internationals ===
Extended content

Player	Events	Notes/Ref
(Wales) Ioan Wall		

Key

- Oly = Olympic Games
- CG = Commonwealth Games
- WC = World Cup
- CT = Champions Trophy
- EC = European Championships
