= Wakefield Hockey Club =

English field hockey club

- Full name: Wakefield Hockey Club
- League: Men's England Hockey League; Women's England Hockey League
- Founded: 1899; 126 years ago
- Home ground: Eastmoor Road, Wakefield West Yorkshire, WF1 3RR

Wakefield Hockey Club is a field hockey club that is based in Wakefield, West Yorkshire, England. The club was founded in 1899. The club plays fixtures at the College Grove Sports Ground, Eastmoor Road pitches (green and blue).

== Teams ==
The club runs multiple teams of all ages, including six men's teams with the first XI playing in the Men's England Hockey League Conference North (as of 2023/24). There are six women's teams with the first XI playing in the Women's England Hockey League (as of 2023/24). Additionally there are six junior teams and the club also hosts the Flyerz, which are a community team for people with disabilities.

== Notable players ==
=== Men's internationals ===
Extended content

Player	Events/Notes	Ref
(England) Norman Hughes	Oly (1984), WC (1978, 1982, 1986)	

Key

- Oly = Olympic Games
- CG = Commonwealth Games
- WC = World Cup
- CT = Champions Trophy
- EC = European Championship
