= Ben Rhydding Hockey Club =

Field hockey club based in Yorkshire, England

- League: Women's England Hockey League; Men's England Hockey League
- Founded: 1901; 124 years ago
- Home ground: Coutances Way, Ben Rhydding, Ilkley, West Yorkshire LS29 8AW

Ben Rhydding Hockey Club is a field hockey club that is based at Coutances Way in Ben Rhydding, Ilkley, West Yorkshire. The club was founded in 1901.

The club runs five women's teams with the first XI playing in the Women's England Hockey League Division One North and five men's teams with the first XI playing in the Men's North Hockey League.

== Notable players ==
=== Men's internationals ===
Extended content

Player	Events/Notes	Ref
(England) Geoffrey Cutter	Oly (1964)	
(England) Marc Gledhill		

Key

- Oly = Olympic Games
- CG = Commonwealth Games
- WC = World Cup
- CT = Champions Trophy
- EC = European Championships

=== Women's internationals ===
Extended content

Player	Events/Notes	Ref
(England) Fiona Crackles		

Key

- Oly = Olympic Games
- CG = Commonwealth Games
- WC = World Cup
- CT = Champions Trophy
- EC = European Championships
