= Bowdon Hockey Club =

Field hockey club in England

Bowdon Hockey Club (men) Bowdon Hightown (women)
- League: Men's England Hockey League; Women's England Hockey League
- Founded: 1886; 140 years ago
- Home ground: The Bowdon Club

Bowdon Hockey Club is a field hockey club based in Bowdon, Greater Manchester, England. The hockey club was established in 1886 but the Bowdon Club which hosts the team was formed in 1856. The women's team have been champions of England on one occasion (2008–09).

== Teams ==
The men's 1st XI play in the Men's England Hockey League and the ladies 1st XI (known as Bowdon Hightown Ladies 1st XI ) play in the Investec Women's Hockey League. The club fields ten men's teams, seven ladies teams and various youth sides. The women's team is known as Bowdon Hightown due to the 2004 merger of the Hightown Hockey Club ladies section and Bowdon Hockey Club.

== History ==
In 1998, Carolyn Reid won the 1998 Hockey Writers' UK Player of the Year, becoming the third Hightown player to have received the award after Linda Carr and Maggie Souyave.

=== Ladies First Team Squad 2025–26 season ===
- 1. Ella Jackson (goalkeeper)
- 2. Anna Mollenhauer
- 3. Nicola Moss
- 4. Margot Willis
- 6. Alexandra Lukin
- 7. Lucy Tennant
- 9. Lauren Burrell
- 11. Maddie Scullion
- 12. Annabel Mills
- 15. Hannah Macdonald
- 17. Sian French (captain)
- 18. Freya Bellamy
- 21. Lucy Smith
- 22. Xenna Hughes
- 63. Ruth Wesson

== Major national honours ==
National champions

- 2008–09 Women's League Champions

National Cup Winners

- 2005–06 Women's National Cup Winners
- 2006–07 Women's National Cup Winners
- 2008–09 Women's National Cup Winners
- 2010–11 Women's National Cup Winners
- 2012–13 Women's National Cup Winners
- 2018–19 Men's Championship Cup Winners (formerly National Cup)

== Notable players ==
=== Men's internationals ===
Extended content

Player	Events/Notes	Ref
(Wales) Chris Ashcroft	CG (2002)	
(England) Alastair Brogdon	CG (2010), WC (2010)	
(England) Brendan Creed		
(Scotland) Alastair Denniston	Oly (1908)	
(England) Michael Hoare		
(Wales) Mike Shaw	2014–2017	
(England) John Neill	Oly (1960, 1964, 1968)	

Key

- Oly = Olympic Games
- CG = Commonwealth Games
- WC = World Cup
- CT = Champions Trophy
- EC = European Championships

=== Women's internationals ===
Extended content

Player	Events/Notes	Ref
(England) Tina Cullen		
(England) Sabbie Heesh		
(England) Holly Hunt		
(England) Kirsty MacKay		
(England) Sam Quek		
(England) Amy Tennant		
(England) Sally Walton		

Key

- Oly = Olympic Games
- CG = Commonwealth Games
- WC = World Cup
- CT = Champions Trophy
- EC = European Championships
