= School colors =

Identifying colors chosen by a school

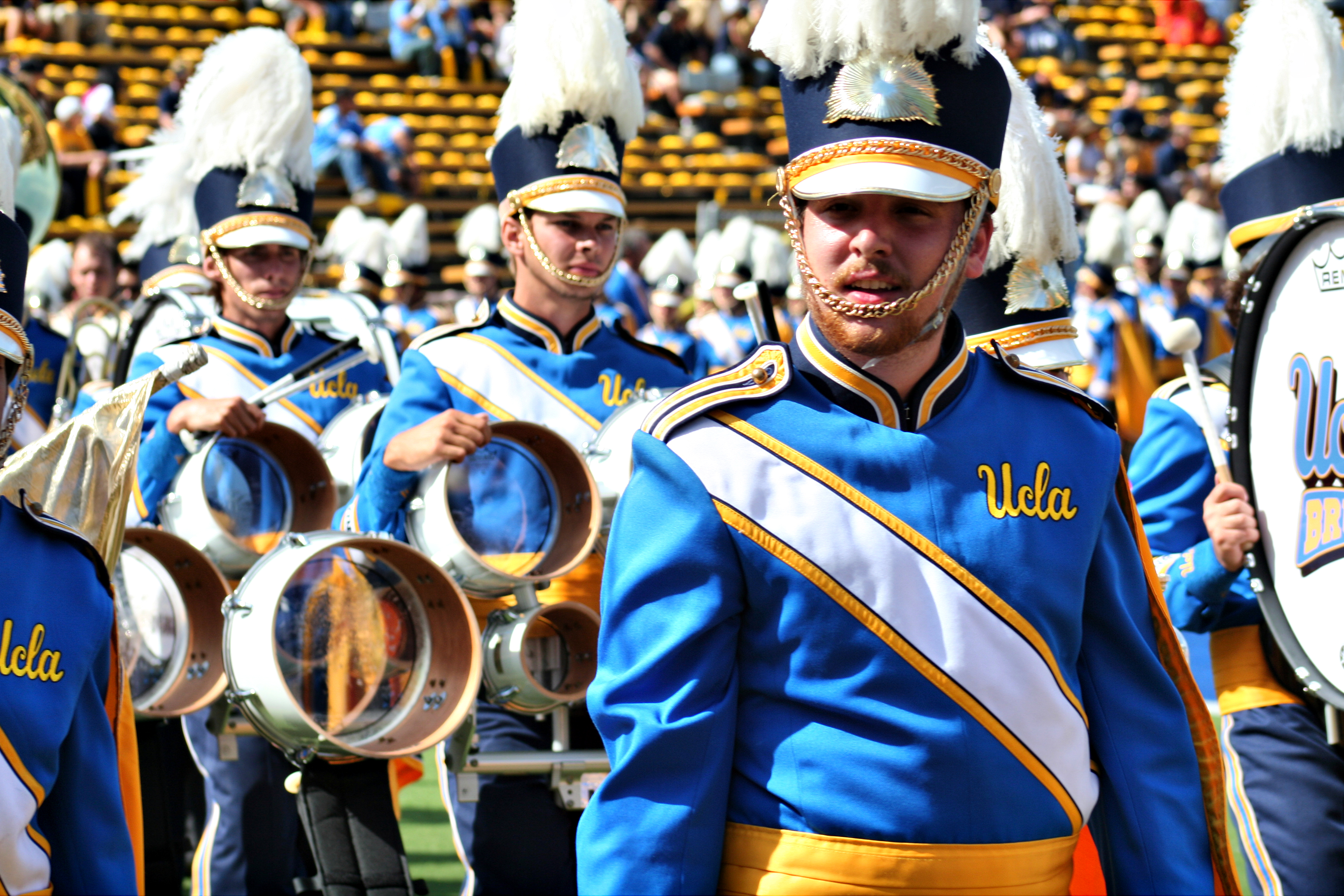
The UCLA marching band dressed in the school's "True Blue" and gold colors in 2010

School colors, also known as university colors or college colors, are the colors chosen by a school, academy, college, university or institute as part of its brand identity, used on building signage, web pages, branded apparel, and the uniforms of sports teams. They can promote connection to the school, known as "school spirit", and help differentiate it from other institutions.

== Background ==
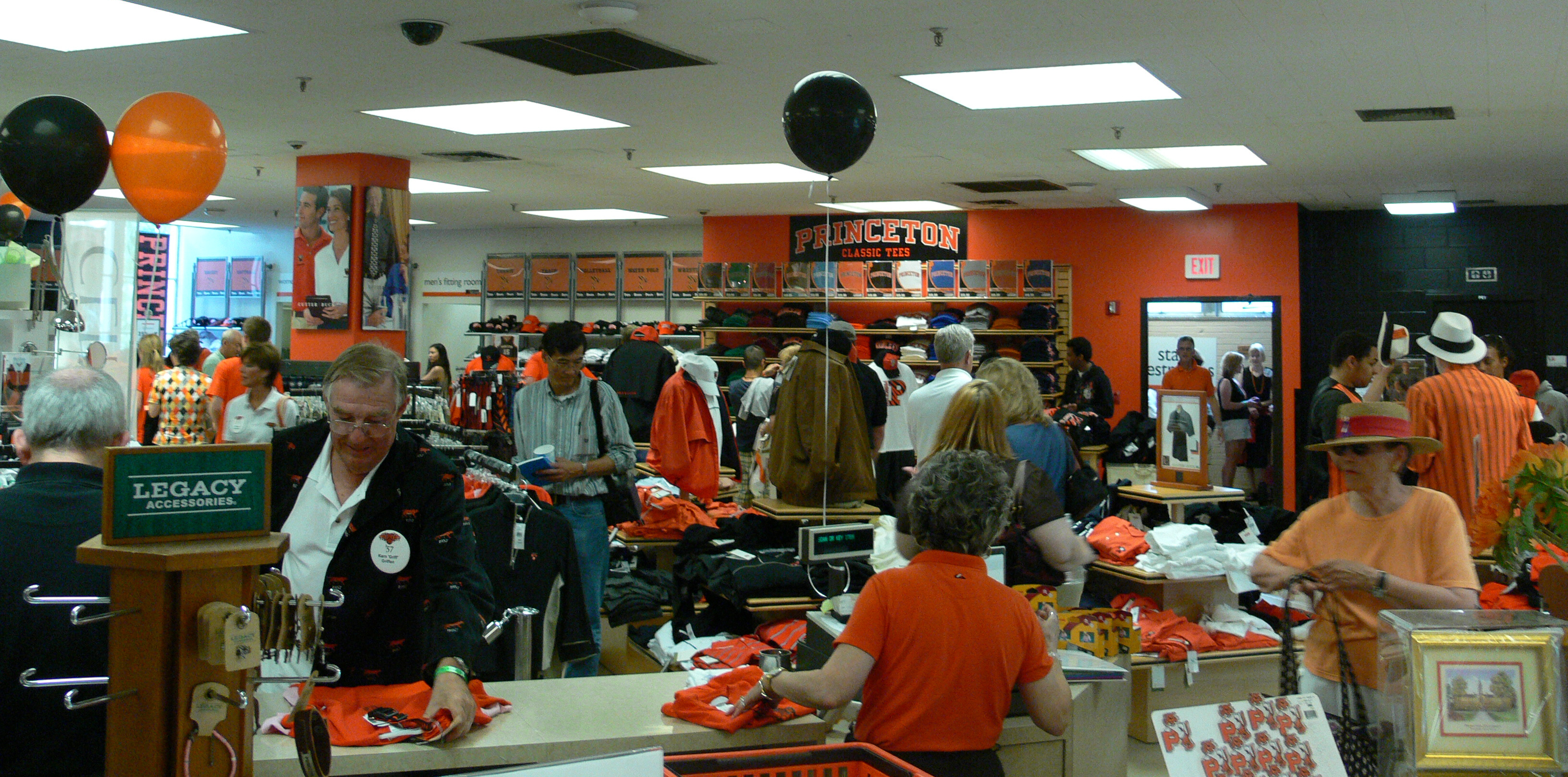
Princeton University's store, featuring the school's orange and black colors

The tradition of school colors appears to have started in England in the 1830s. The University of Cambridge chose Cambridge blue for the Boat Race against the University of Oxford in 1836, Westminster School have used pink as their color since a boat race against Eton School in 1837, and Durham University adopted palatinate purple for its MA hood some time before that degree was first awarded in 1838.

Many US colleges adopted school colors between 1890 and 1910. These were generally chosen to be distinctive, something that grew harder as more colors and color combinations were taken, although many Presbyterian colleges chose to imitate Princeton University's black and orange. Some American schools have adopted one or more of the colors of red, white or blue from the national flag.

The most popular colors among US colleges ranked in the 2012 Forbes Top 50 or in the 2012–13 NCAA basketball or cross-country rankings were white, blue, red, black, and gold. These same five colors were the most popular five colors among colleges in each of the three rankings individually.

== Sports ==
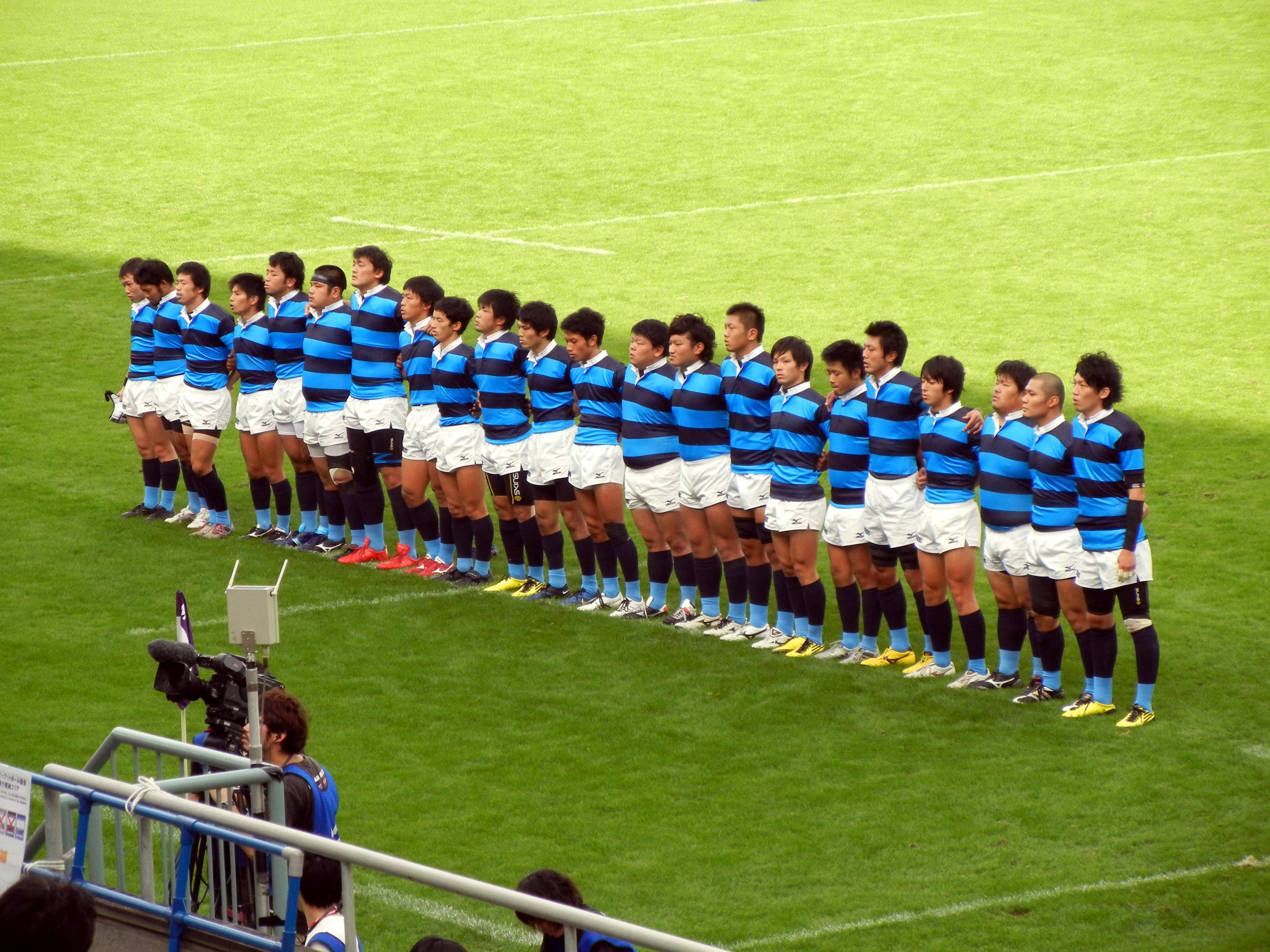
Nippon Sport Science University Rugby Football Club players wearing their light and dark blue colors

The use of colors to identify university sports teams dates back at least to the second Boat Race between Oxford and Cambridge in 1836. While most universities use the same color(s) for their sports and other university branding, Cambridge Blue is only one of twelve colors in the supporting palette for the university, not one of their six core colors. The University of Nottingham uses green and gold for its sports, but the rest of the university uses blue as its brand color. Roger Williams University changed its athletics colors in 2018 to match the university colors, in order to "foster a strong, unified visual identity for RWU Athletics that is more cohesive with the overall University", stating that "this combination will be powerful in strengthening RWU's brand identity and awareness".

Most competitive teams keep two sets of uniforms in different colors so the two teams in a match can be distinguished. In some sports, such as American football, a darker color, often the school's main color is emphasized on home uniforms, with the away team wearing a lighter color or white, while in other sports, such as basketball, a lighter color is used for the home team and a darker color for the away team. A third option used for some sports, such as association football, is that the home team gets to choose their color and the away team plays in a contrasting strip.

In addition, various groups that generate support for athletic teams, including cheerleaders and marching bands, wear uniforms with the colors of their school. At many private schools, or more traditional state schools, "colors" are awards presented for achievement in a sport.

=== Nicknames ===
The university color can sometimes become a nickname for the sports program. For example, the Palatinate (Durham) and the African Violet (Loughborough) in the UK, and the Harvard Crimson and Cornell Big Red in the US.

== Academic dress ==
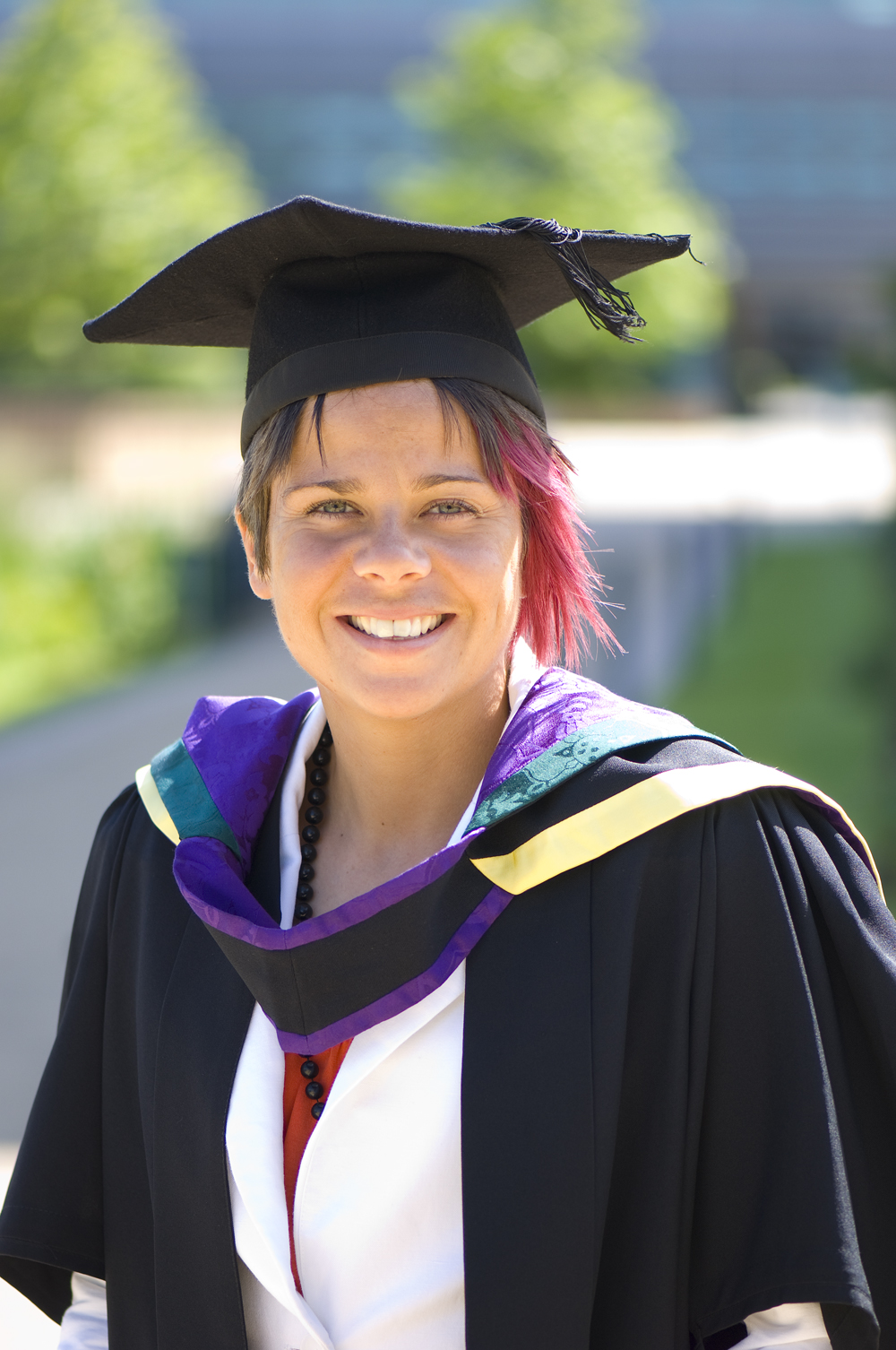
Edge Hill University's academic colors of heliotrope (purple), gold, and green seen on the hood of honorary graduate Sue Smith

School colors are also used in the academic dress of many institutions. The first school color adopted by a university for its academic dress was palatinate purple at Durham University, England, some time between 1835 and 1838. Schools in the US that award an academic hood to their students and abide by the American Council on Education guidelines use hoods lined with their school colors and trimmed with velvet in a color indicating the discipline of the degree. Some US doctoral robes will also be in the colors of the university which granted the degree, departing from the Academic Costume Code color of black.

== Academic scarves ==
Many British, Irish and Commonwealth universities and some American universities have an academic scarf in the university's colors, usually long, woollen and patterned only with lengthwise stripes of varying widths. At collegiate universities such as the universities of Oxford, Cambridge, Durham, and Lancaster, each college has its own colors and scarf. Other non-collegiate universities such as Glasgow and Newcastle have scarf colors for each faculty.

== Notable school colors ==
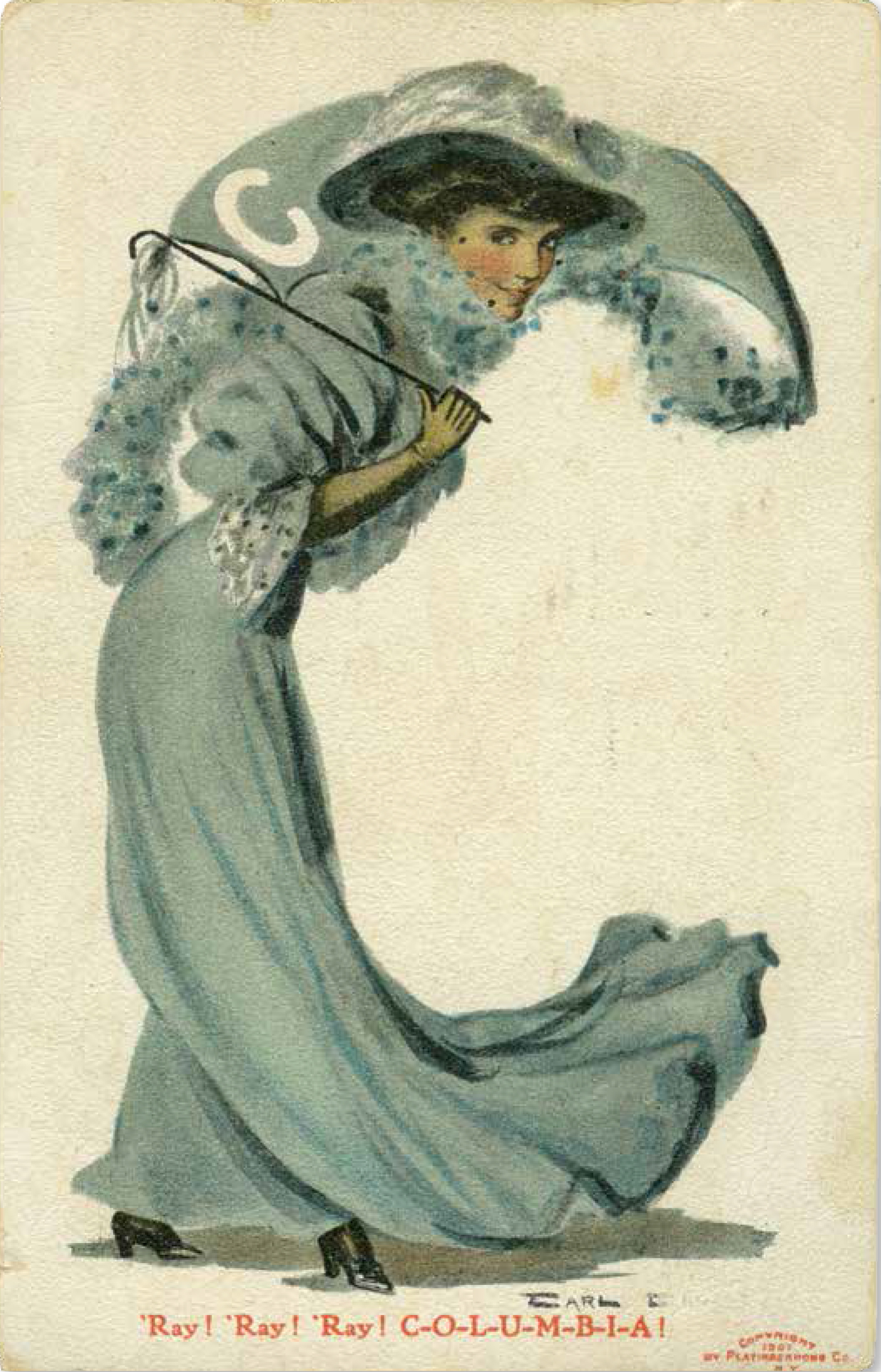
A 1907 postcard representing Columbia University, featuring a woman dressed in Columbia blue

- Cambridge blue – University of Cambridge
- Carolina blue – University of North Carolina
- Columbia blue – Columbia University
- Duke blue – Duke University
- Eton blue – Eton College
- Oxford blue – University of Oxford
- Palatinate – Durham University
- U of T blue – University of Toronto
- Yale blue – Yale University

== See also ==
- Gang colors
- Colors (motorcycling)
- Sports uniform
- Varsity letter
- Couleur
