= Team Durham =

Sport organisation of Durham University

- Institution: Durham University
- Location: Durham, England
- Established: 1927
- Affiliations: British Universities and Colleges Sport; Wallace Group
- Colours: Palatinate
- Type: Athletic Union

Team Durham (formerly Durham University Athletic Union, DUAU) is a student-run organisation responsible for sport at Durham University. Durham University's sports programme, run by Team Durham, has produced more professional sports people than any other UK university (141 as of 2022) and has twice seen Durham named Times and Sunday Times Sports University of the Year (2015 and 2023). It has ranked in the top three institutions in British Universities and Colleges Sport (BUCS) every season since 2011–12. Eight Team Durham alumni or current athletes have won nine Olympic and Paralympic medals since 1996.

Team Durham played first class cricket as Durham University Centre of Cricketing Excellence and Durham MCC University from 2001 to 2020. The rugby club plays in BUCS Super Rugby, BUCS's flagship competition and the highest level student rugby in the UK, and were league winners in 2019–20 and 2021–22. Team Durham compete as the Durham Palatinates in the top-level Women's British Basketball League. With two members in each of the men's and women's GB Hockey teams at the 2024 Summer Olympics, BBC Look North branded Durham "the talent factory of the north".

Team Durham awards the Palatinate as its sporting colours. Famous recipients of a Full Palatinate include cricketer Nasser Hussain, triple jumper Jonathan Edwards and rugby player Phil de Glanville.

Team Durham instituted a policy in 2016 allowing students to train and (if permitted by the national governing body) compete in the team that best fitted their gender identity. This was proposed to the National Union of Students as a model for a national policy.

== History ==
=== Administrative history ===
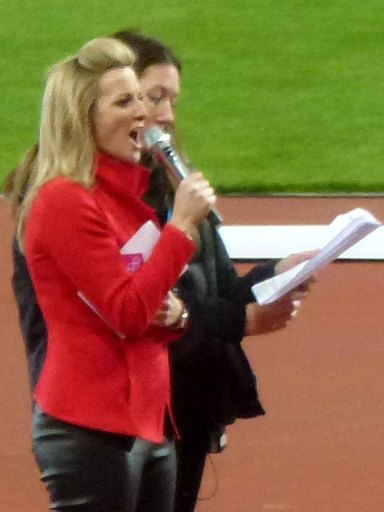
Team Durham alumna, Great Britain gymnast and TV presenter Gabby Logan hosting the BBC's coverage of the 2012 Olympics

The Durham Colleges Athletic Union was formed by the captains of the men's sports teams in the Durham division of Durham University in 1927, prior to which sport in the Durham division was organised by the university. A federal Durham University Athletic Union was formed in 1929 with representatives from the Durham Colleges Athletic Union, from the Armstrong College and College of Medicine athletic unions in the Newcastle division of the university, and from the men's and women's university teams. This took over the organisation of university-level sport from the sports sub-committee of the Durham University Students' Representative Council, which had run this from 1919. From 1931 it was affiliated as a full member to the Universities Athletic Union (now British Universities and Colleges Sport; BUCS).

In 1946, the Durham Colleges Athletic Union merged with the Durham Colleges Women's Athletic Union, which had been formed in 1938. It became the Durham University Athletic Union in 1963, when the Newcastle division of the university became the independent Newcastle University. In 2002, Gabby Logan launched Durham University's "Team Durham" initiative to provide coaching and facilities for talented athletes. The athletics union was re-branded as Team Durham in 2006.

As a consequence of the Charities Act 2006, which removed exempt charitable status from students' unions, Team Durham was, along with a number of other student associations and some junior common rooms, legally incorporated into the university as a Durham Student Organisation in 2011.

=== Sporting history ===
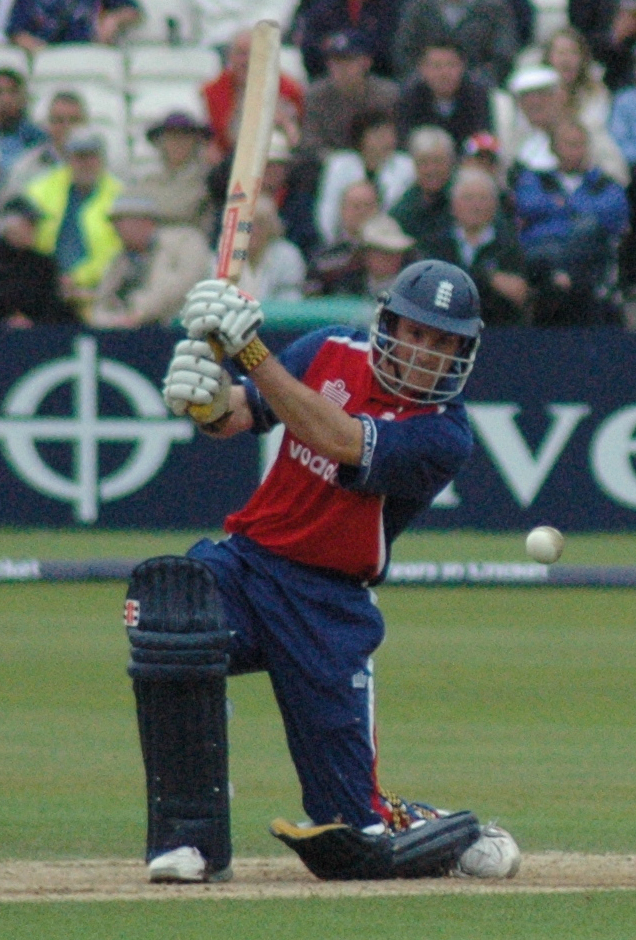
Team Durham alumnus Andrew Strauss, "the most famous MCC University graduate", playing for England at the Oval

Sport at Durham University dates back to the university's foundation, with boats having raced in the first Durham Regatta in 1834, at the end of the first academic year. The first recorded university cricket match was in 1842. Durham University was one of the founding members of the Inter Varsity Athletics Board in 1919.

After the formation of the athletics unions and joining the Universities Athletics Union, Durham's first national titles came in men's cricket, with victories in 1938 and 39. These were the only victories until after the Second World War, when victories came in women's netball in 1949, 50 and 51, men's tennis in 1949, men's rugby union in 1951 and 55, mixed rifles in 1951, men's fencing in 1952, 53, 59 and 60, men's golf in 1953, men's association football in 1956, men's badminton in 1957 and 59, men's table tennis in 1957, 58 and 59, women's fencing in 1959 and 62, and women's tennis in 1960, before the separation of the Newcastle division in 1963.

In recent years, Team Durham was ranked second (behind Loughborough) in the BUCS overall championship in 2012, 2013, 2014, 2015, 2016, 2017 and 2018. They came third (behind Loughborough and Nottingham) in 2019 and 2022 (the 2019–20 season was incomplete, and the 2020–21 season did not happen, due to COVID). Durham were ranked top in BUCS for team sports in 2014-15, when they also became only the second team (after Loughborough) to gain over 4000 BUCS points. Both of these achievements were repeated in 2015-16. In 2016-17, Durham had 30 top tier BUCS teams, three more than closest rivals Loughborough, and had a total of 119 teams entered in BUCS competitions, the most of any UK university.

Durham University Boat Club held the BUCS rowing Victor Ludorum for ten years consecutively from 2004 until 2013 and won it again in 2015 and 2023.

In 2022, Team Durham won BUCS national championships in women's cricket, men's rugby, men's fencing, women's futsal, men's lacrosse, women's rowing and women's volleyball.

==== BUCS/BUSA record ====
The Universities Athletics Union was formed from the Inter-Varsity Athletics Board in 1930. British Universities Sports Association (BUSA) was formed in 1994 by the merger of the Universities Athletics Union (UAU; formed 1919), the British Universities Sports Federation, the British Students Sports Federation, the British Polytechnics Sports Association and the British Colleges Sports Association. In 2008, BUSA merged with University College Sport to form BUCS. Durham participated in UAU competitions from 1931 to 1994, in BUSA from 1994 to 2008, and in BUCS from 2008 onwards.

Year	Position		Notes
2023–2024	3rd		
2022–2023	3rd		
2021–2022	3rd		
2020–21	-		Due to the ongoing COVID-19 pandemic the 2020–21 season was unable to go ahead.
2019–20	-		The competition was suspended early due to the COVID-19 pandemic, the points table was voided since the season was not completed.
2018–19	3rd		
2017–18	2nd		
2016–17	2nd		
2015–16	2nd		1st in league and cup competitions
2014–15	2nd		1st in league and cup competitions
2013–14	2nd		1st in league competitions
2012–13	2nd		
2011–12	2nd		
2010–11	5th		
2009–10	6th		
2008–09	6th		
2007–08	4th		
2006–07	6th		
2005–06	8th		
2004–05	5th		
2003–04	10th		
2002–03	5th		
2001–02	10th		
2000–01	9th		
1999–2000	4th (Men)	9th (Women)	
1998–99	4th (Men)	11th (Women)	
1997–98	2nd (Men)	12th (Women)	
1996–97	3rd (Men)	16th (Women)	
1995–96	6th (Men)	18th (Women)	

=== Olympics ===
The first Durham alumnus to compete in the Olympics was sprinter Reginald Reed at the 1906 Intercalated Games.

Since 1996, Durham alumni and students have won medals at:

- 1996 Summer Olympics: Jonathan Edwards – Silver in the men's triple jump
- 2000 Summer Olympics: Jonathan Edwards – Gold in the men's triple jump
- 2008 Summer Olympics: Stephen Rowbotham – Bronze in the men's double scull
- 2012 Summer Olympics: Sophie Hosking – Gold in the women's lightweight double scull
- 2012 Summer Paralympics: Lily van den Broecke – Gold as cox in the mixed coxed four
- 2016 Summer Paralympics: Hazel Macleod – Silver as sighted guide for Alison Peasgood is the women's PT5 paratriathalon
- 2020 Summer Olympics: Fiona Crackles – Bronze in women’s hockey
- 2020 Summer Olympics: Angus Groom – Silver in the men’s quadruple scull
- 2024 Summer Olympics: Lauren Irwin – Bronze in the women's eight

== Facilities ==
=== Maiden Castle ===
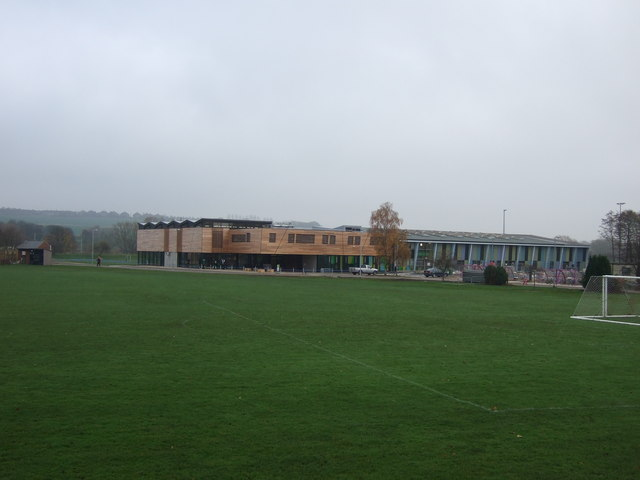
Maiden Castle sports centre in 2011

Team Durham is based at the Maiden Castle sports centre, with a large 2,000 square metres (22,000 sq ft), a smaller 1,000 square metres (11,000 sq ft) hall, an indoor cricket centre, a fencing salle, an ergo gallery, rowing tank, dojo, sports science labs, an esports room, and other facilities, along with three 3G pitches (used for association football, American football and lacrosse), two water-based hockey pitches, tennis courts, and a variety of grass pitches, including baseball/softball and cricket. The centre was upgraded at a cost of £35 million between 2017 and 2020. The football ground, which lies inside a running track and has a 300-seat grandstand and turnstile-controlled access, has been used since this upgrade as the home ground of Durham W.F.C. in the FA Women's Championship. The running track only has four lanes and very limited field facilities, so official meets cannot be held.

=== The Racecourse ===
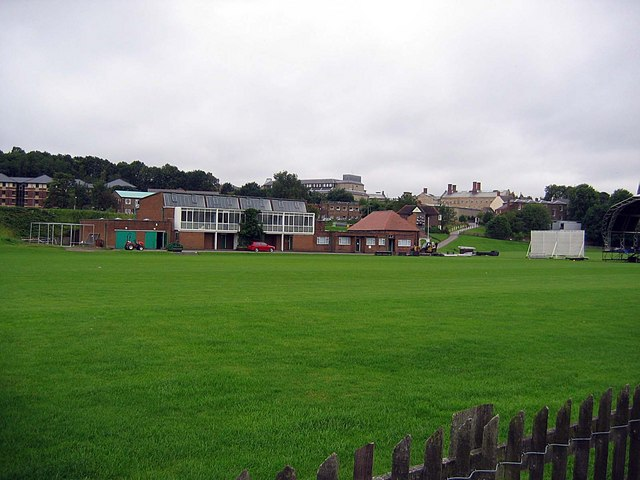
The Durham University pavilion at the Racecourse

There is a first class cricket ground at the Racecourse, along with other grass pitches and Green Lane Cricket Ground (Durham City Cricket Club), used for some inter-college games and non-first team BUCS matches. The Rugby fives club has two fives courts in the Racecourse pavilion.

=== Hollow Drift ===
The rugby club shares a ground with Durham City RFC at Hollow Drift, and the university has further grass pitches adjacent to this at Whinney Hill, used for inter-collegiate rounders and ultimate frisbee. Hollow Drift, which is owned by the university, has been earmarked for further development of its sporting facilities in the university's 2017–2027 estates masterplan. The ground has seen crowds of over 6,000 for the rugby club's annual charity matches against other top BUCS rugby teams. The Original All Blacks played at Hollow Drift in 1905, beating Durham County, the English county champions, 16–3 in front of a crowd of 8,000. There is also the Hollow Drift range, an indoor 25 yard smallbore target rifle range used by Durham University Rifle Club.

=== Elsewhere ===
The waterpolo team uses the pool at Durham County Council's Freeman's Quay Leisure Centre. In addition to courts at Maiden Castle, the tennis club uses the David Lloyd centre in Sunderland and the Durham Archery Lawn Tennis Club. The university boat club has a boat house on the River Tyne in Gateshead, shared with Tyne United Rowing Club, as well as at Maiden Castle, and many college clubs have boathouses along the River Wear in Durham. The sailing club uses Derwent Water reservoir, where they have a fleet of firefly dinghies, as their training ground.

== Inter-college sport ==
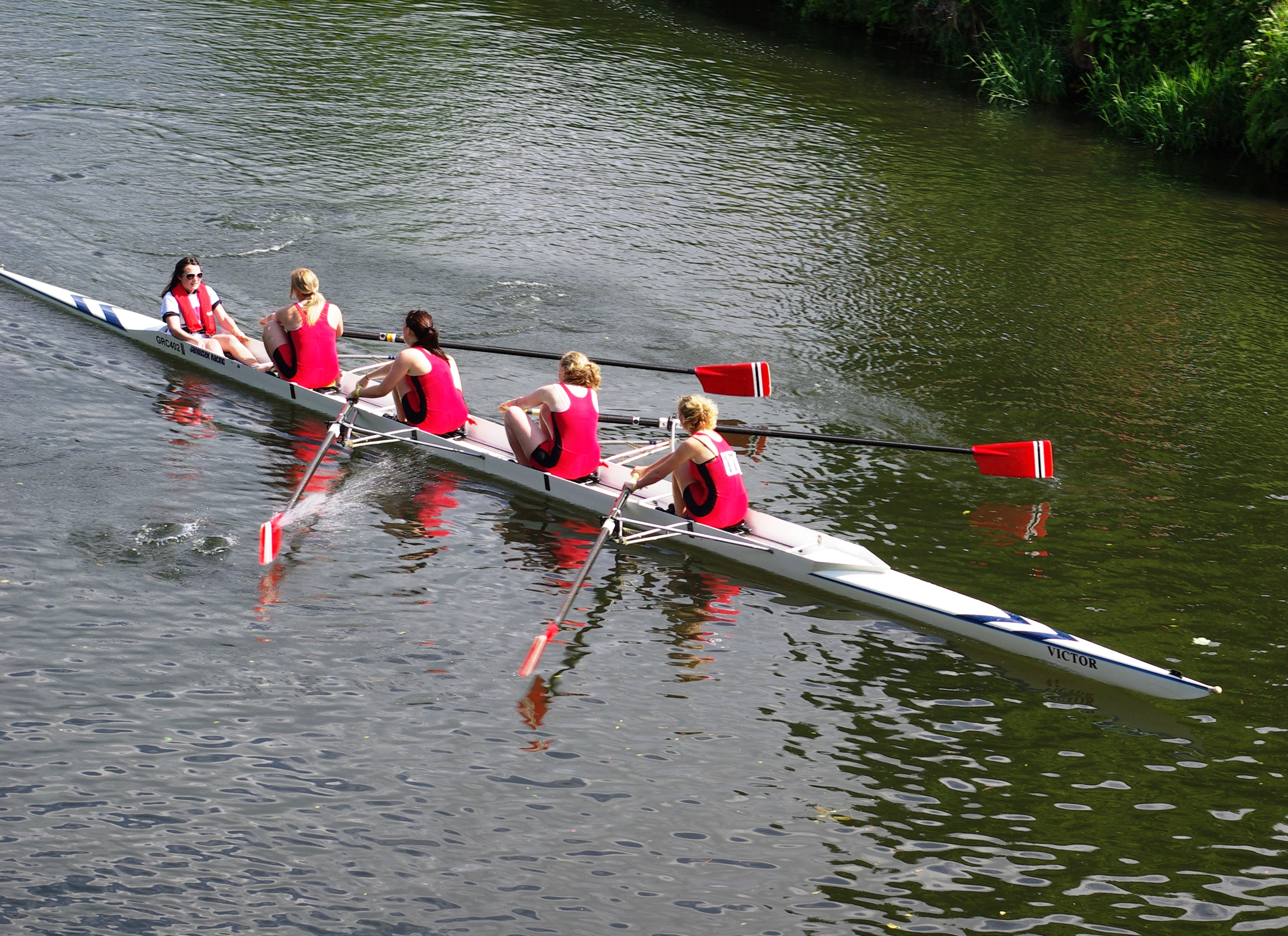
Rowers from Grey College

Team Durham runs a large intramural sports programme based around the colleges of Durham University, with three quarters of students participating. 550 college teams compete across eighteen sports: badminton, basketball, cheerleading, cricket (indoor and outdoor), football, hockey, futsal, lacrosse, netball, pool, rounders, rowing, rugby union (full-contact and touch), squash, table tennis, tennis, ultimate frisbee and volleyball.

Inter-college men’s football, in particular, is hugely popular, with around ninety 11-a-side teams playing regular matches. Collingwood College alone field 16 teams and claim to be the UK’s largest amateur football club. Netball is similarly popular, with around 50 teams competing.

Alongside the regular season, some colleges hold an inter-collegiate varsity tournament in Easter term, with two colleges pitting their A teams against one another in a variety of sports over one day.

== Varsity matches ==
=== BUCS Varsity ===
Durham competes in the BUCS Varsity against Loughborough University, which has been organised twice-yearly (home and away) as part of the BUCS fixture list since 2015.

Date	Venue	Durham	Tied	Loughborough
1 February 2017	Loughborough	5	2	6
23 November 2016	Durham	12	0	1
3 February 2016	Loughborough	8	1	7
25 November 2015	Durham	12	2	1

=== College varsities ===
Team Durham's best college teams participate in two annual college varsity competitions against their counterparts from colleges of the University of York and against teams from Loughborough Sport's intra-mural sports competition.

=== Boat Race of the North ===
Team Durham rowers compete against Newcastle University in multiple categories in the annual Boat Race of the North competition.

== Student performance programmes ==
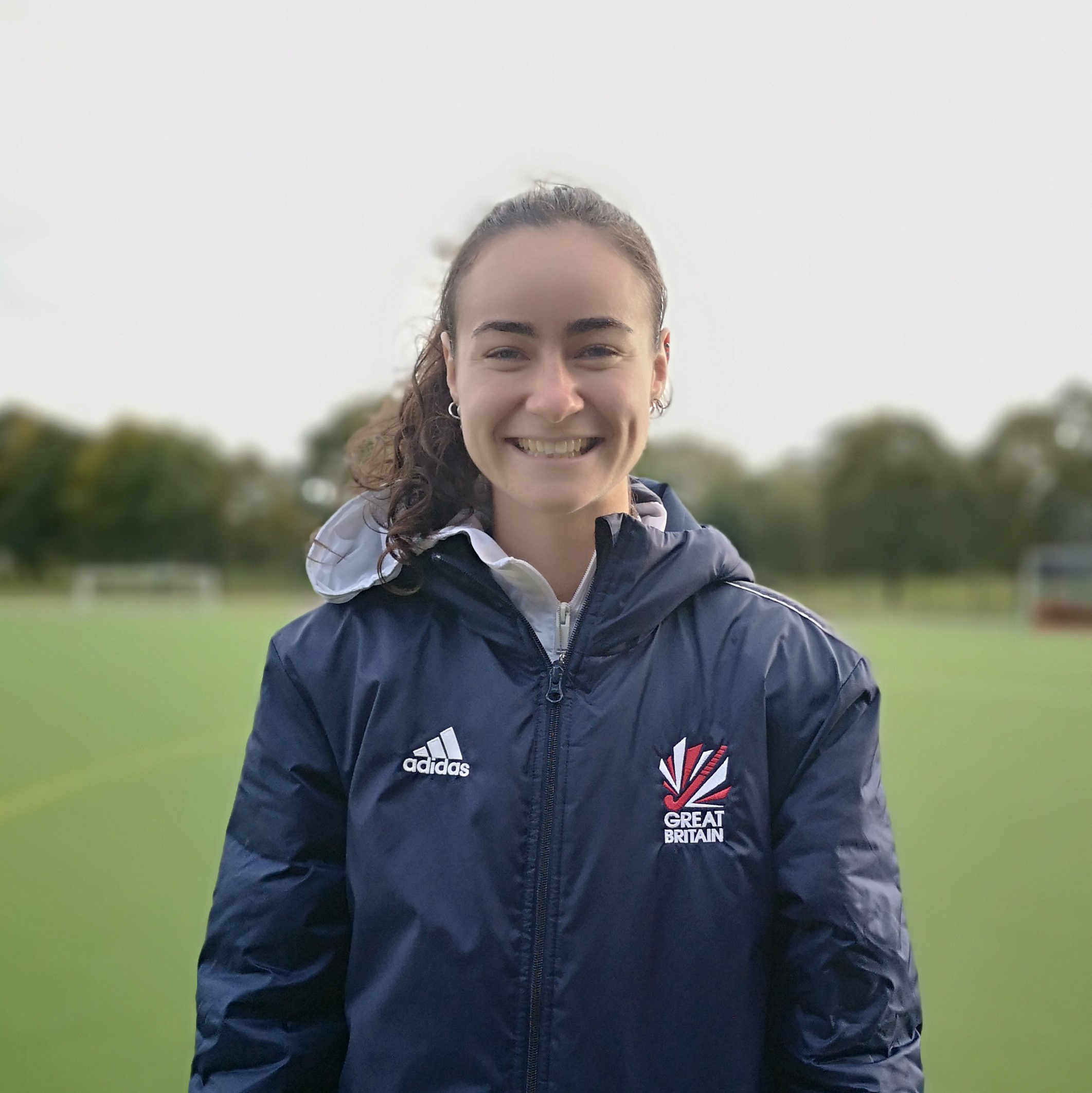
Fiona Crackles, winner of Olympic bronze and Commonwealth Games gold medals for hockey while a Team Durham player

Team Durham has student performance programmes covering 17 sports. It has recognised national centres of excellence in a number of sports, including the Durham MCC University cricket programme (funded by the England and Wales Cricket Board), British Rowing Performance Centre status, and Lawn Tennis Association University Partner status. It is also a Football Association Football Accredited University, with the highest 3* rating.

There are 25 Vice Chancellor's scholarships available annually for undergraduates across sports, arts and music (normally 8–10 awards in sports), 20 Palatinate scholarships for students who just missed out on a Vice Chancellor's Scholarship in sports, and 3 Weldon-le Huray scholarships in sports for students from low-income backgrounds. In addition, there are over 100 sports scholarships for postgraduate students. Durham is also one of the "delivery sites" for Sport England's Talented Athlete Scholarship Scheme.

=== Partnerships ===
Team Durham has partnerships with Durham W.F.C. (women's football), Durham United F.C. (men's football) and DMP Sharks (women's rugby).

== University clubs ==
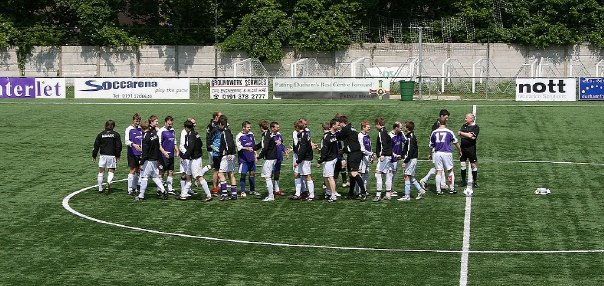
Durham University AFC vs Stirling Alumni at Durham City in 2008

Team Durham has 56 clubs representing the university across 53 sports, many of which compete in BUCS but including others in non-BUCS sports. Some of the more notable university clubs are:

- Durham University Boat Club
- Durham University Cricket Club
- Durham University Hockey Club
- Durham University Men's Lacrosse Club
- Durham University Rugby Football Club
- Durham University Rifle Club
- Durham University Swimming Club

Team Durham teams competing in non-student leagues include:

- Durham University Hockey Club – Women's England Hockey League Premier Division and Men's England Hockey League Division One North
- Durham University Athletic Football Club (through a partnership with Durham United F.C.) – Northern Football League Division Two

=== Esports ===
Team Durham also encompasses esports through Durham University Esports and Gaming (DUEG). DUEG participates in 12 games, across National Student Esports (NSE) and National University Esports League (NUEL) tournaments.

== Charity events ==
The Athletic Union hosts 3 charity events per year, the Rugby Charity Challenge, Durham Fun Run and Twenty:20 Charity cricket. These events raise money for Sport Action in Zambia, Team Durham's official charity.
