= Durham University Swimming Club =

University sports team

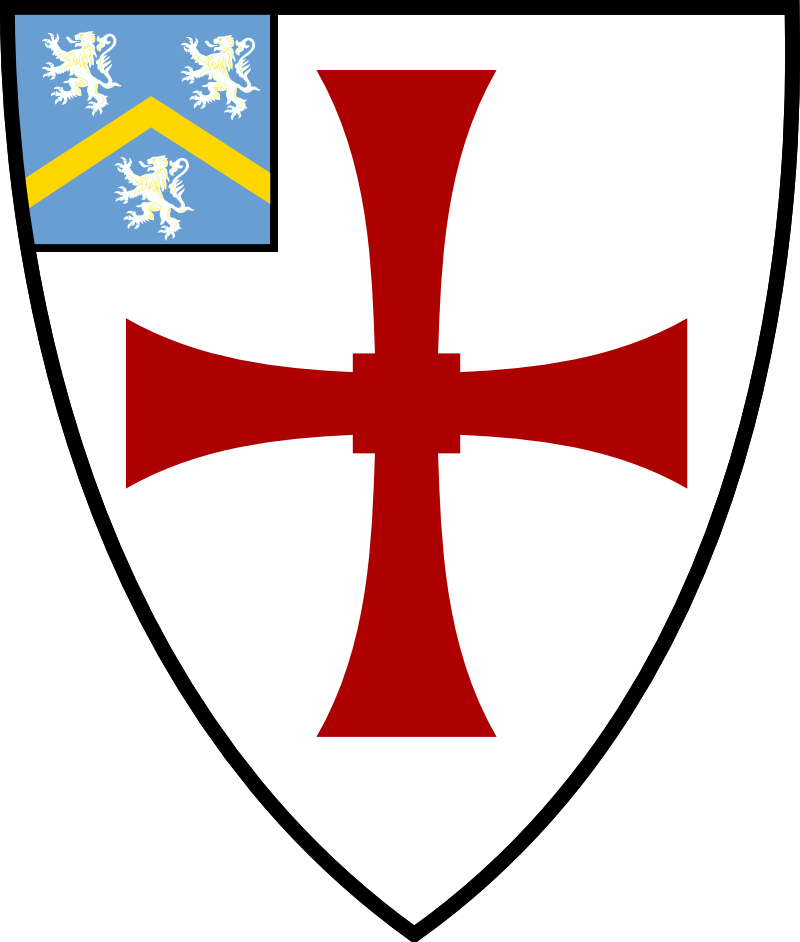
- Founded: 1832
- University: Durham University
- Conference: BUCS
- Location: Durham, England
- Home pool: Freeman's Quay; Durham School
- Nickname: DUSC
- Colors: Palatinate and white

Durham University Swimming Club (or DUSC) is the swimming club of Durham University. The club is made up of a wide selection of swimmers throughout the university from the various colleges, though is mainly aimed towards swimmers competing for the University. They compete every year in the British Universities and Colleges Sport Championships (or BUCS) in both the Short Course and Long Course championships, both held at the international swimming pool Ponds Forge, Sheffield in November and February respectively.

The club also competes in the BUCS team championships, where the 1st team compete in the Northern Division 1 and the 2nd team in Northern Division 2, having both winning promotion from Northern Division 2 and 3 respectively in the 2012/13 season.

== Club information ==
DUSC is associated with Team Durham, and receives funding as well as help in other areas from this organisation. DUSC does not have access to a university owned pool, and instead train predominantly at the Durham County Council owned Freeman's Quay, which opened in 2008, as well as weekly sessions at Durham School. They also have access to gym facilities at the Graham Sports Centre at Maiden Castle. DUSC were able to finance the services of part-time coaches; as of the 2014-2015 season, Durham student (2012-2015) Chris Dove (also a coach at local club Derwentside ASC) coaches the university squad several mornings each week. The club's gym sessions are also monitored by employees of Team Durham.

The BUCS championships at Sheffield twice a year are the most significant event of the club's competitive calendar.

The Inter-Collegiate swimming competition, hosted at Durham School on two separate nights (one for Hill colleges, the other for Durham colleges on the Bailey), is also a regular annual event with the winners receiving the Inter-College Cup.

== History ==
The club traces its origins back to the formation of the university in 1832. Gary Hollywood was the Swimming Club's first professional swimming coach from 2001 to 2005, having coached Caroline Saxby to two Commonwealth Games finals in 2002. Under Gary Hollywood's coaching DUSC had its most successful season finishing in 8th place overall at BUSA National Swimming Championships in 2004.
