= Oxford Blue (colour) =

Shade of blue used by Oxford University

Colour coordinates
- Hex triplet: #002147
- sRGB^{B} (r, g, b): (0, 33, 71)
- HSV (h, s, v): (212°, 100%, 28%)
- CIELCh_{uv} (L, C, h): (13, 26, 254°)
- Source: Oxford Branding Guidelines
- ISCC–NBS descriptor: Dark blue
- B: Normalized to [0–255] (byte)

Oxford Blue colour #002147

Oxford Blue, a shade of navy blue, is the official colour of the University of Oxford. The official Oxford branding guidelines set its definition as Pantone 282, equivalent to the hex code #002147.

With a hue code of 212, this colour is a very dark tone of azure.

== Usage ==
Oxford Blue stems from the University of Oxford's combined-colleges (whole-university) leading sport teams, thus including Oxford Blues (first sides) and Half-Blues (second sides). In UK rowing, blades consisting only of that colour are used only by these two sides. However it is used in combination with other colours on the blades of Ardingly, Bristol Ariel, City of Oxford, Isle of Ely, Sudbury, Torquay, and Hatfield College (Durham) clubs, Dragon School (Oxford), and by various Oxford colleges, most notably Oriel and Green Templeton. The colour (or a very close variant said to be the same) is used by the Toronto Argonauts of the Canadian Football League; Wycombe Wanderers F.C.; and universities commonly known, such as U of T (see U of T Blue); Duke (see Duke blue); Penn State; Georgetown; Michigan (as to many athletics teams); and Berkeley.

== Origin ==
The colour was originally chosen by Charles Wordsworth and Thomas Garnier, two members of the 1829 Boat Race crew using "the Christ Church guernsey as our pattern (four of the crew being Christ Church men), only with a broader and darker blue, instead of black stripe. Hence the origin of the 'Dark Blues'." The colour itself is said to have been borrowed from Harrow Blue, as Charles Wordsworth and Charles Merivale, the creators of The Boat Race, attended Harrow School. Similarly, Cambridge Blue is said to have derived from Eton blue.

== See also ==
- Blue (university sport)
  - Blue (university sport)#University of Oxford
- U of T Blue
- Duke blue
- Cambridge Blue (colour)
- Palatinate (colour)
- List of colours
