= Athletic Union =

An athletic union, athletics union (AU) or sports union usually refers to the group of student sports clubs within a university or other higher education institution in the United Kingdom.

== General information ==
Sports clubs affiliate to their athletic union for support and finance. If a sports club is not part of the athletic union then it is probably not an official or recognized club of the institution.

Each athletic union is often run and supported by the institute's students' union, but are sometimes operated by the institute itself or semi-autonomous from either the students' union or the university. Athletic unions can (and most do) affiliate to British Universities and Colleges Sport (BUCS).

In a typical structure, members of sports clubs automatically become members of the athletic union with all the benefits of the membership (including insurance and social aspects) included. Individual students who compete in individual sports, where no club exists in their chosen activity, can also join the athletic union.

Officers of the sports clubs generally become ex officio members of the AU standing committee and this committee typically elects an AU chair and vice-chair. The AU president (sometimes called sports officer or activities officer) is usually elected from the wider student body as part of executive committee elections.

Many athletic unions employ one or more administrators to work alongside the elected AU president in support of the sports clubs, and to keep a continuity from year to year within the athletic union.

== Athletic unions ==
- Durham University Athletic Union
- Hull University Athletic Union
- Manchester Metropolitan Athletic Union
- University of Nottingham Athletic Union
- University of St Andrews Athletic Union
