= Maiden Castle Sports Centre =

Sports complex in Durham, England

Maiden Castle
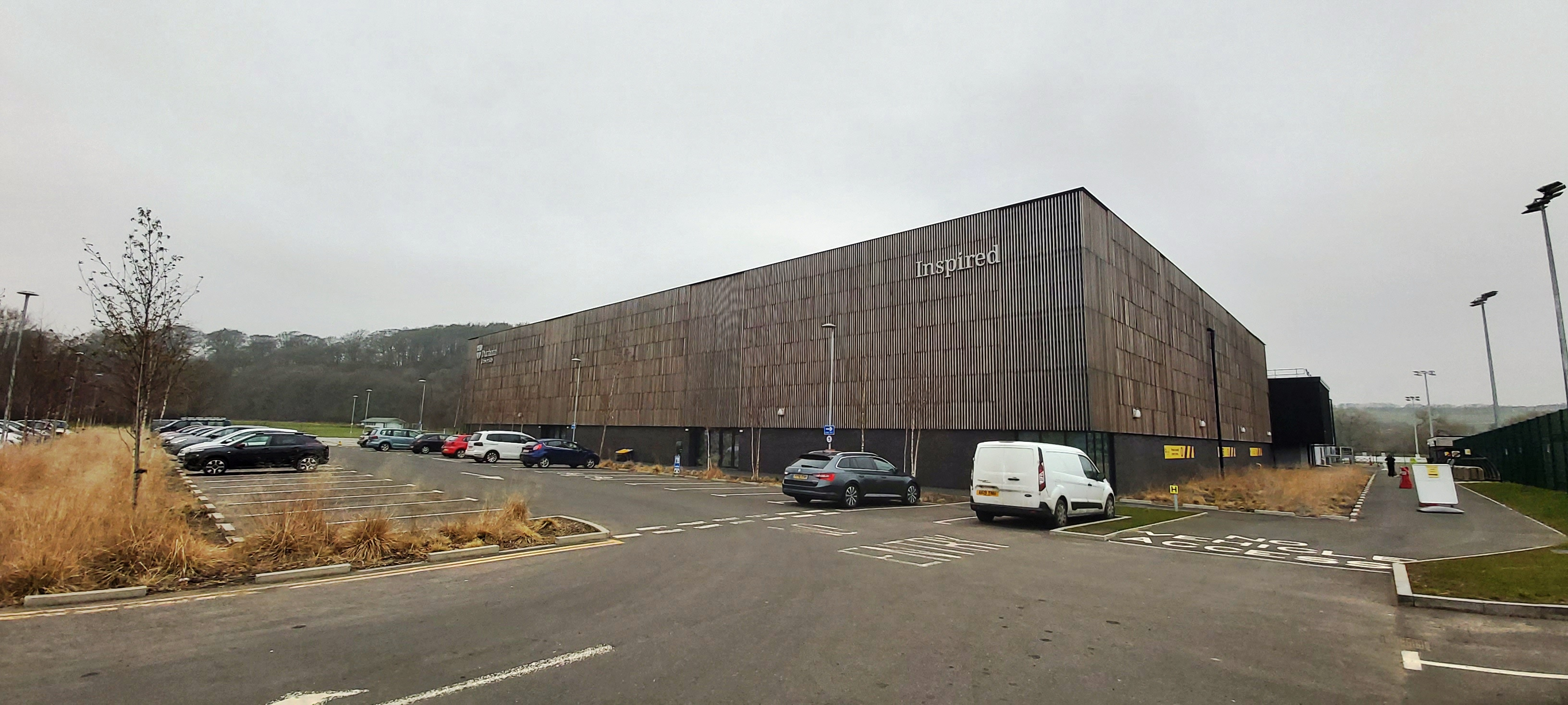
- Interactive map of Maiden Castle
- Address: Maiden Castle; Stockton Road; Durham; DH1 3SE; United Kingdom
- Coordinates: 54°46′01″N 1°33′32″W
- Elevation: 35 m (115 ft) to 36 m (118 ft)
- Owner: Durham University
- Capacity: 2,400 (football)
- Scoreboard: Yes (digital)
- Record attendance: 2,381 (football: Durham W.F.C. vs Manchester City W.F.C., Women's FA Cup, 14 January 2024)
- Public transit: "Houghall College" bus stop (multiple routes from Arriva and Go North East)
- Parking: 250 cars; 16 coaches

Construction
- Built: 1961–1965
- Opened: 8 May 1965
- Expanded: 1984–88, 2009–12, 2017–19

Tenants
- Team Durham (BUCS): 1965–present
- Durham W.F.C. (WSL2): 2020–present
- Hartlepool United (training ground): by 2009–2017 and 2021–present
- DMP Durham Sharks (Premier 15s): 2021
- Newcastle United (training ground): 1992–2001

Maiden Castle Sports Centre, also known as the Graham Sports Centre and the Durham University Sport and Wellbeing Park, is the main sports complex at Durham University and the home for many of the university's teams. It also stages professional football as the home of Durham W.F.C. since 2020 and is used as an international venue, including hosting one of the four 2023 Women's EuroHockey Championship Qualifiers tournaments in summer 2022 and the 1995 IAAF World Cross Country Championships. It has been used as a training ground by Hartlepool United since 2021, having previously been used by Newcastle United.

The sports centre is situated on the southeast side of Durham on the floodplain of the River Wear, just south of the Maiden Castle iron age fort from which it takes its name. The main sports complex, including the centre buildings and artificial pitches, are located on the west bank of the river, with vehicular access from the A177 Stockton Road, with additional playing fields on the east bank linked to the main complex via a footbridge. Paths along the river link Maiden Castle to the university's other sports fields at Hollow Drift (150 m north) and The Racecourse.

== Development ==
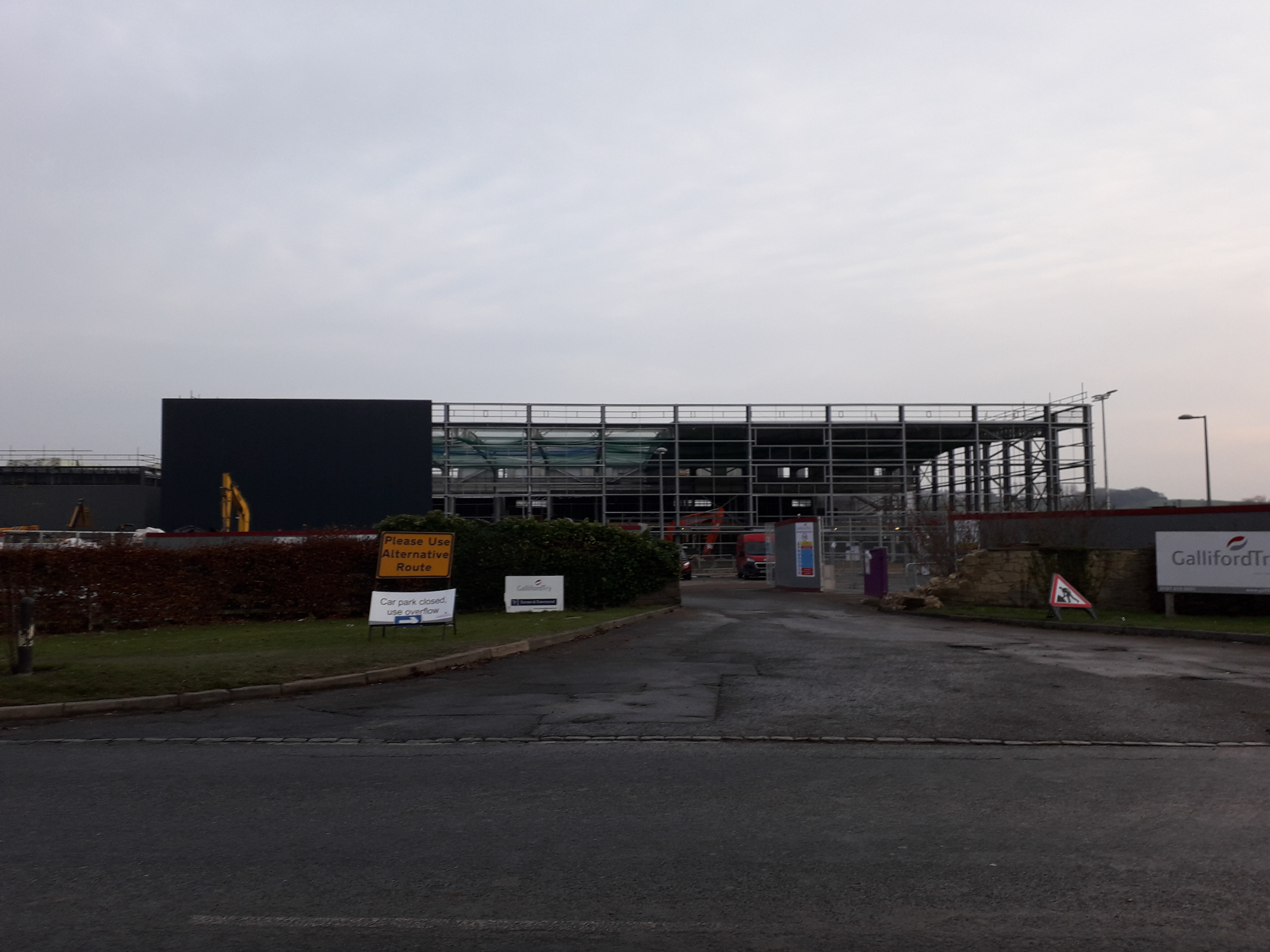
Construction work during the 2017–19 upgrade

The original sports centre was designed by Cordingley and McIntyre and constructed by R.E. Coleman Ltd between 1961 and 1965. It was opened on 8 May 1965 by Clive Rowlands, captain of the Welsh rugby team, as "Maiden Castle Sports Hall and Playing Fields", with an athletics meeting being held the same day. An all-weather hockey pitch was added in the early 1970s and a footbridge was built across the River Wear, allowing for the development of more pitches on the east bank of the river.

Expansion of the facilities was proposed in 1981 and funds were raised as part of Durham University's 150th anniversary appeal. This led to its redevelopment as the Graham Sports Centre over 1984 to 1988, named (from January 1985) after university registrar Ian Graham who had died in December 1984.

In 2001 the sports centre was refurbished and upgrades were made to the artificial pitch, running track and tennis courts. In 2002 a new water-based astroturf hockey pitch was opened alongside the existing all-weather pitch.

A £6.7 million upgrade to Maiden Castle, including £500,000 from Sport England, to add indoor cricket nets, a fencing piste and a powered indoor rowing tank was begun in 2009 as part of the sporting legacy of the 2012 Olympic Games. A 3G rubber crumb artificial pitch was installed for the start of the 2009/10 season. The renovated centre was opened in 2012 by Sport and Olympics Minister, Hugh Robertson. Facilities at Maiden Castle were used for training by the Sri Lanka Olympic badminton team prior to the games. A further £500,000 grant from Sport England in 2013 enabled construction of a second 3G rubber crumb artificial pitch. The pitch was officially opened with a lacrosse match between Durham University's women's team and the Team England development squad.

In 2017–19 a major upgrade to Maiden Castle was carried out at a cost of £35 million. External work in 2017 saw the installation of a third 3G rubber crumb inside the running track, the resurfacing of the existing water-based artificial hockey pitch and the reconstruction of the sand-based hockey pitch as a water-based pitch, as well as upgrades to the carparking at the site. Internal work and extensions to the existing buildings, designed by FaulknerBrowns Architects and built by Galliford Try over 2018–19, saw the addition of a 12 court sports hall, indoor cricket centre, sports labs, indoor tennis and squash courts and a new fitness suite, as well as the construction of sports laboratories for use in sports science degree programmes. However, the expansion raised opposition from the City of Durham Trust as the site lies within the North East Green Belt and there were concerns about the environmental impact of the floodlights. Durham County Council's senior planning officer found that the development was inappropriate for green belt land but that the harm was "less than substantial" and outweighed by the benefits of maximizing participation in sport.

== Use of the sports complex ==
=== For university sport ===
The sports centre is owned by Durham University and had been used for university sport since it opened in 1965. It hosts inter-varsity sport as one of Team Durham's home grounds and also inter-collegiate sport between the colleges of Durham University. Sports played at Maiden Castle include American football, athletics, association football, badminton, baseball, basketball, cricket (indoor and outdoor), fencing, field hockey, floorball, futsal, gymnastics, handball, judo, karate, lacrosse, mixed martial arts, netball, rugby league, rugby union, squash, tennis, touch rugby, ultimate frisbee, volleyball and wheelchair basketball. It has also hosted university teams playing in top-tier national leagues, including the Women's England Hockey League Premier Division and Super League Basketball.

Maiden Castle hosted the University Athletics Union Championships in 1966 and 1973, the British Universities Championships in 1970 and the British Students Cross Country Championships in 1994. It has hosted the British Universities and Colleges Sport Northern Conference finals from 2026.

=== As a training centre ===
During the group stages of the 1966 FIFA World Cup, group 4 was based in the northeast of England. The Soviet team was based at Grey College, Durham and trained at Maiden Castle. The Soviets ordered a larger flag when they realised that the flag of the Italian team, who were training across the road at Houghall College, was larger. The replacement flag was then stolen as a "spur of the moment thing" in broad daylight. Police were unable to trace it, but it was handed in to the offices of The Northern Echo over 50 years later and returned to the university.

From 1992 to 2001, Maiden Castle was the training ground for Newcastle United, attracting crowds of up to 5,000 fans. The openness of the Maiden Castle training sessions was credited with helping Kevin Keegan's team bond with their fans.

Hartlepool United used Maiden Castle as a training ground from at least 2008/9 up to 2017, when work began on the renovation, and returned in 2021/2 after the new facilities opened. In addition to training, Hartlepool have played friendly matches at Maiden Castle.

In July 2022, the Zambian team trained at Maiden Castle in the run up to the 2022 Commonwealth Games.

=== As an international venue ===
In December 1994, Maiden Castle hosted the County Durham International Cross Country (later the Great Edinburgh International Cross Country). A few months later it hosted the 1995 IAAF World Cross Country Championships.

Maiden Castle staged two under-21 international hockey matches between England and Scotland in 2004, with England winning both games.

Durham hosted its first full international hockey matches in 2022, with the six matches of 2023 Women's EuroHockey Championship Qualifier A, hosted by England, being held at Maiden Castle over 25–28 August. The four competing teams were England, Wales, Croatia and Slovakia, with Russia having been originally scheduled to participate prior to their exclusion following the Russian invasion of Ukraine. Prior to the qualifiers, Wales and Scotland played a three-match uncapped series at Maiden Castle in May 2022, with Scotland winning all three games.

=== As a professional club ground ===
Durham W.F.C. (association football) moved to Maiden Castle in summer 2020 following work on the facilities around the 3G pitch and running track to meet the requirements of the FA Women's Championship. Upgrades included the construction of a 300-seat, fully-covered stand, upgraded floodlights and changing rooms, facilities for broadcasting and press, and the installation of turnstiles and a barrier around the spectator area.

The Darlington Mowden Park Durham Sharks (rugby union) played their home games in the latter part of the 2020/21 Allianz Premier 15s season (from February 2021) at Maiden Castle.

Durham County Cricket Club have used the Maiden Castle cricket ground occasionally for Second XI Championship matches.

== Facilities ==
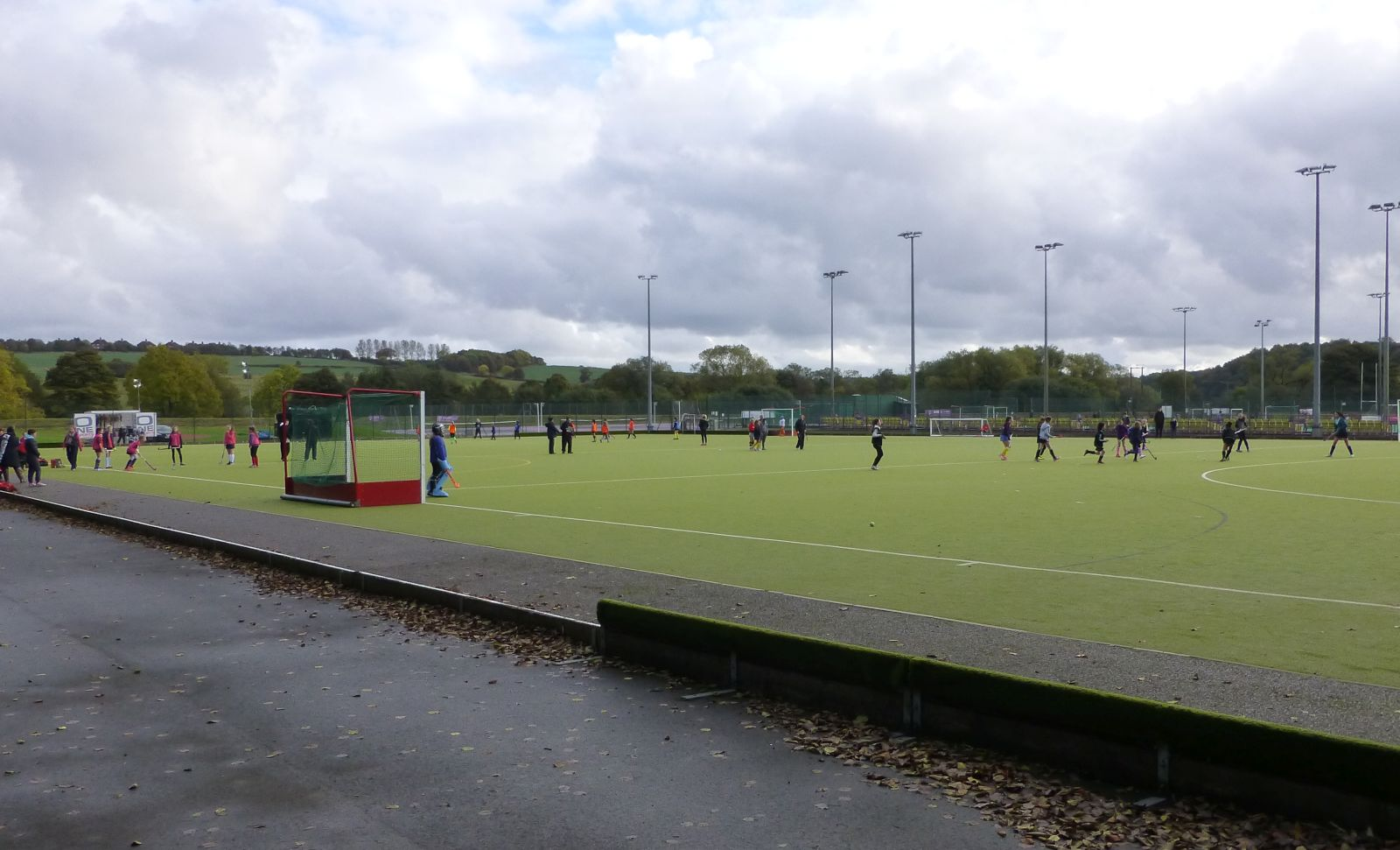
Artificial pitches at Maiden Castle

The indoor facilities along with the artificial pitches and a grass-wicket cricket field (with grass pitches in the outfield) are located on the west side of the River Wear, with access from the A177 Stockton Road. The remaining grass pitches and a cricket field with an artificial wicket are located on the east side of the river with access from the west bank via a footbridge. The Durham University Boat Club boathouse is also located at the Maiden Castle site, on the west bank of the river. All three 3G rubber crumb pitches are included on the register of full-size artificial pitches certified by the Rugby Football Union as meeting World Rugby standards and on the Football Association's 3G pitch register as meeting FIFA standards. In total, there are around 44 acres (18 ha) of playing fields.

Outdoor facilities include:

- Floodlit 100 metres (110 yd) × 64 metres (70 yd) playing surface, 3G rubber crumb artificial football pitch and four-lane running track with 300-seat stand, spectator fencing, scoreboard and turnstiles
- Two other floodlit 3G rubber crumb artificial pitches of 110 metres (120 yd) × 75 metres (82 yd) and 115 metres (126 yd) × 76 metres (83 yd) total area
- Two floodlit 91.4 metres (100.0 yd) × 55 metres (60 yd) playing surface, water-based astroturf artificial hockey pitches
- Seven grass pitches
- Cricket field with artificial wicket
- Cricket field with grass wicket
- Tarmac tennis and netball courts

Indoor facilities include:

- 2,106 square metres (22,670 sq ft) 12 court sports hall, with seating for 2,000 spectators in arena configuration
- 1,031 square metres (11,100 sq ft) sports hall (two basketball courts)
- Fitness suite
- Martial arts dojo
- Fencing salle
- Powered rowing tank
- Ergo gallery
- 885 square metres (9,530 sq ft) indoor cricket centre
- Aerobics room
- Weights room
- Physiotherapy centre

The centre also hosts the Durham University Esports Hub, which is equipped with 12 gaming PCs and streaming equipment.

== See also ==
- The Racecourse – Durham University's other major sports venue and main cricket ground
- Darsley Park – Newcastle United's current training ground
