= Flag of Kirkcudbrightshire =

Kirkcudbrightshire
- Proportion: 3:5
- Adopted: 11 June 2016
- Design: The cross of St. Cuthbert counterchanged on a green and white quartered background

The Flag of Kirkcudbrightshire is the flag of the county and Stewartry of Kirkcudbright. It was registered with the Flag Institute as the flag of the county on 11 June 2016 after the Lord Lieutenant petitioned the Lord Lyon.

It features a counterchanged design of green and white, with a charge of the pectoral cross found on the body of Saint Cuthbert, the patron saint of Northumbria.

== Design ==
The flag was designed by the Flag Institute's Philip Tibbetts. The green and white emblem represents the checked cloth used to count taxes by the Stewards of the Lords of Galloway with the St Cuthbert's cross sitting on top. The town and county of Kirkcudbright were named after the saint, with an early rendition of the name being Kilcudbrit, derived from the Scots Gaelic Cille Chuithbeirt (Chapel of Cuthbert). The Anglo-Saxon saint's remains were kept here for seven years between exhumation at Lindisfarne and re-interment at Chester-le-Street. A pectoral cross was found on the saint's body when his tomb was opened in the nineteenth century. The original is on display in Durham Cathedral where he was eventually buried. That cross is also depicted on the flag of County Durham.

=== Colours ===
The colours of the Kirkcudbrightshire flag are the following:

Scheme	Green	White
Pantone (paper)	356 C	Safe
HEX	#007a33	#FFFFFF
CMYK	100, 0, 58, 52	0, 0, 0, 0
RGB	0, 122, 51	255, 255, 255

== History ==
The flag of County Durham

A pectoral cross was found on the body of Saint Cuthbert when his tomb was opened in the nineteenth century, which ended up being depicted on both the flags of Kirkcudbrightshire and Durham.

The former county council of Kirkcudbrightshire adopted a coat of arms which used a chequered band of green and white to symbolise the checked tablecloth used by the Stewards of the Lords of Galloway when collecting taxes and other dues - the green and white colours being of the “Stewartry of Kirkcudbright”, counterchanged on the flag itself. The flag was registered with Philip Tibbetts of the Flag Institute following a consultation with Sir Malcolm Ross, who was at the time the Lord-Lieutenant for the Stewartry of Kirkcudbright. He said of the flag's adoption:

The only other county to receive this honour in recent times is Caithness. Arrangements will be made shortly so that anyone interested can obtain a Stewartry flag.

The flag is used across the county now.
