= Yale Blue =

Shade of blue used by Yale University

Color coordinates
- Hex triplet: #00356B
- sRGB^{B} (r, g, b): (0, 53, 107)
- CMYK^{H} (c, m, y, k): (100, 75, 8, 40) (Note: Process build percentages for coated paper. Yale specifies 100-70-5-35 for uncoated paper and describes both as general guidelines.)
- HSV (h, s, v): (210°, 100%, 42%)
- CIELCh_{uv} (L, C, h): (22, 45, 254°)
- Source: Yale University
- ISCC–NBS descriptor: Deep blue
- B: Normalized to [0–255] (byte); H: Normalized to [0–100] (hundred)

Yale Blue is the dark blue color used in association with Yale University.

== History ==
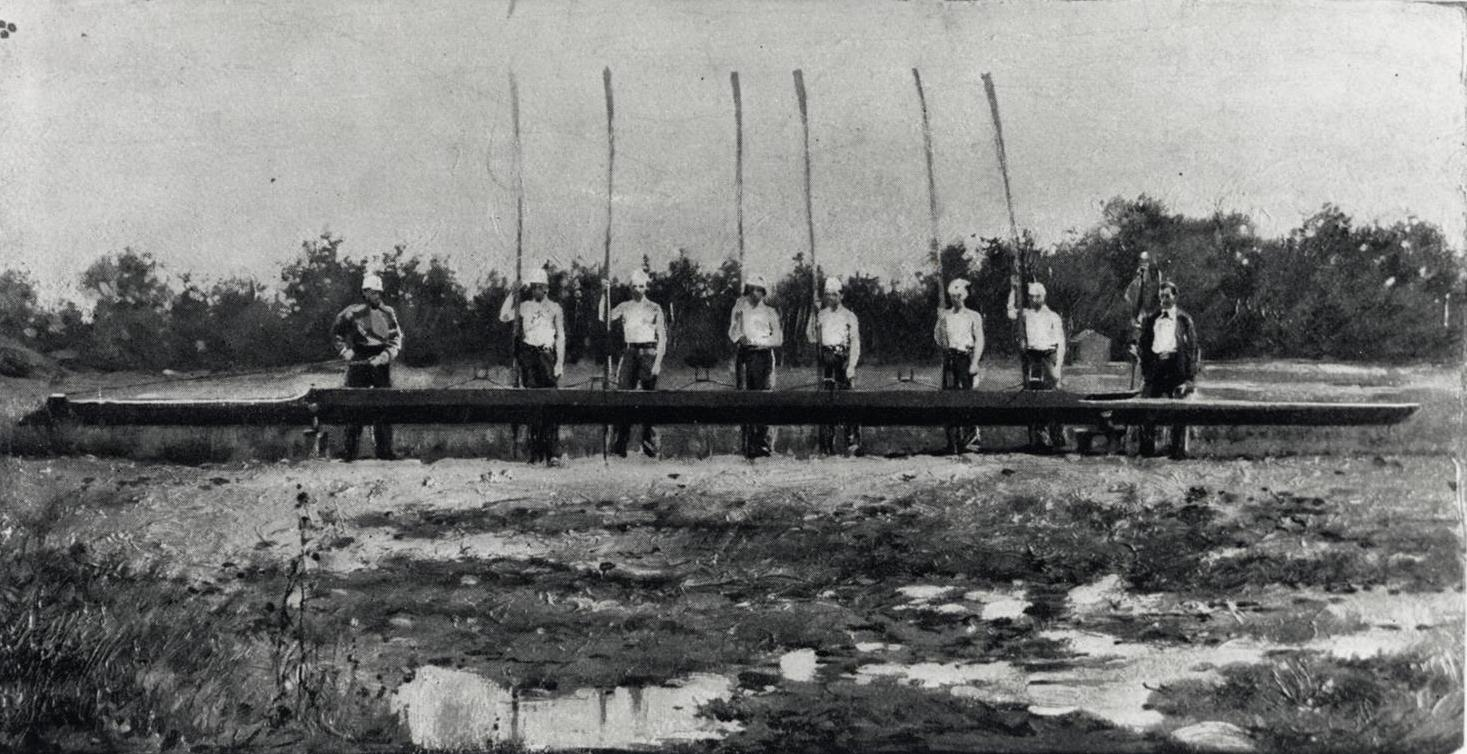
The flag in this painting of the Yale 1859 crew team is believed to be the first documented Yale Blue, though the photograph is in black and white.

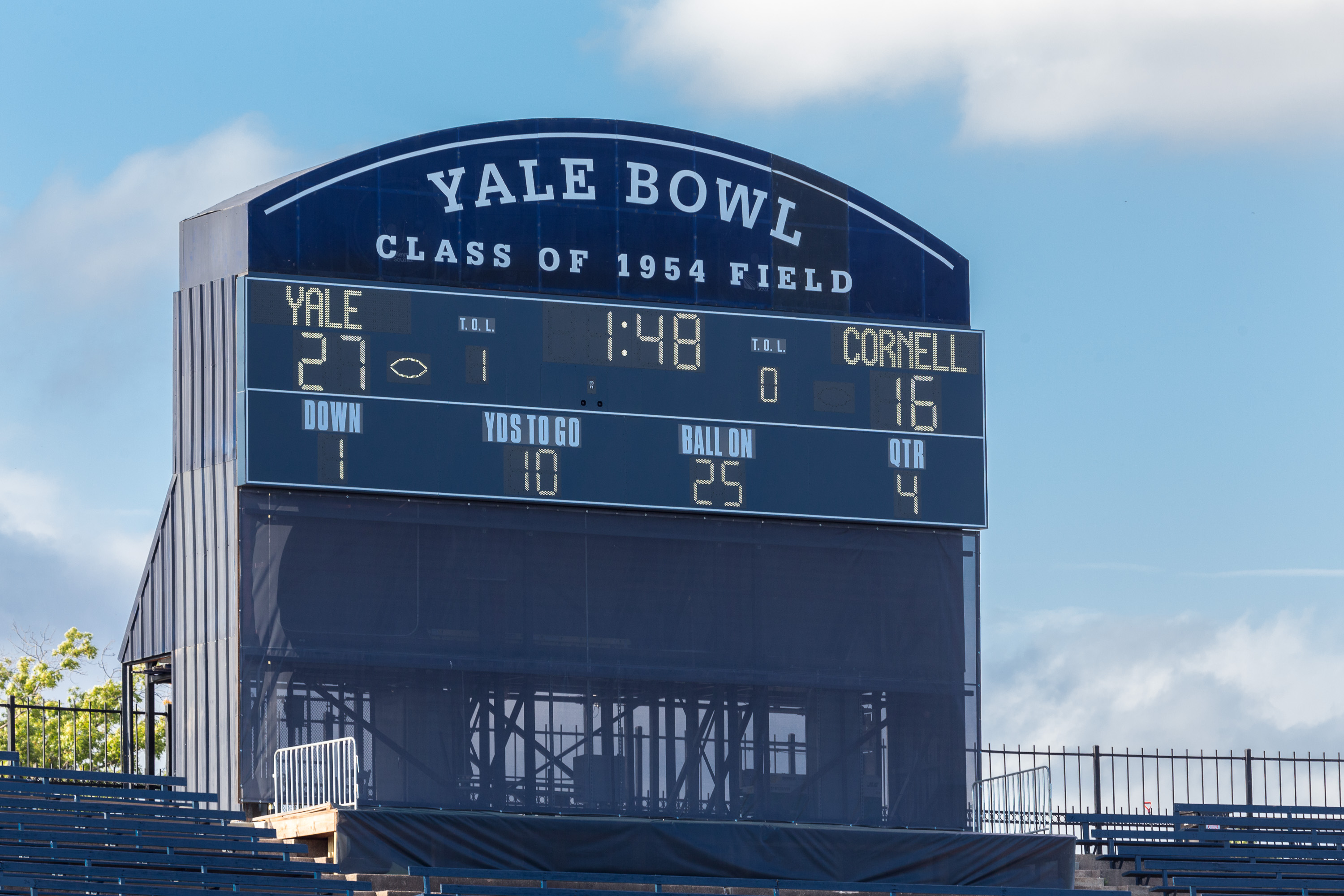
The Yale Bowl scoreboard, painted in Yale Blue.

Since the 1850s, Yale Crew has rowed in blue uniforms, and in 1894, "dark blue" was officially adopted as Yale's color, after half a century of the university being associated with green. In 1901, this was amended to "dark blue of the shade known as the color of the University of Oxford", although Oxford Blue, while only 2° different in hue, is now substantially darker than Yale Blue, with a brightness of 28% compared to Yale Blue's 42%. In 2005, University Printer John Gambell was asked to standardize the color. He had characterized its spirit as "a strong, relatively dark blue, neither purple nor green, though it can be somewhat gray. It should be a color you would call blue." A vault in the university secretary's office holds two scraps of silk, apocryphally from a bolt of cloth for academic robes, preserved as the first official Yale Blue.

The university administration defines Yale Blue as a custom color whose closest approximation in the Pantone system is Pantone 289. As a spot color, Yale Blue inks may be ordered from the Superior Printing Ink Co., formulas HB 6254 for coated paper and HB 6255 for uncoated paper. As a process color, Yale Blue is specified as CMYK 100-75-8-40 for coated paper and CMYK 100-70-5-35 on uncoated paper, with the university describing these percentages as general guidelines only.

== Other uses ==
Yale Blue is one of the two official colors of Indiana State University, the University of Mississippi, and Southern Methodist University.

Yale Blue is an official color of the University of California, Berkeley, adopted in 1868 by the university's founders, who were mostly Yale graduates. However, UC Berkeley uses a slightly different shade, Pantone 282 , from that adopted by Yale. The "Pomona Blue" (Pantone 2935) used by Pomona College is similar to Yale Blue and is a reference to the role of Yale alumni in the college's founding.

The color is similar to Duke University's Duke Blue as both are derived from prussian blue, where Pantone 289 remains an acceptable approximation.

The official color "DCU Blue" of Dublin City University is Pantone 289 , very close to Yale Blue, but with no acknowledged connection.

The zine produced by Yale's campus radio station WYBC is named Relatively Dark Blue Neither Purple Nor Green in reference to Gambell's description of the color.

== See also ==
- Columbia blue
- Duke blue
- Tiffany Blue
- Yale (typeface)
- Lists of colors
