= Flag of County Durham =

Flag of English historic county

- Proportion: 3:5
- Adopted: 2013
- Designed by: Katie, Holly and James Moffat

The flag of County Durham is used to represent the historic county of Durham. It consists of a blue and gold bicolour with a counterchanged depiction of the cross of St Cuthbert on top, and was designed in 2013 through a competition and public vote. It is intended to be freely used by anyone who wishes to fly it.

== Design and symbolism ==
The flag is a bicolour, the upper half gold and the lower blue. On this is a counterchanged depiction of the pectoral cross of St Cuthbert.

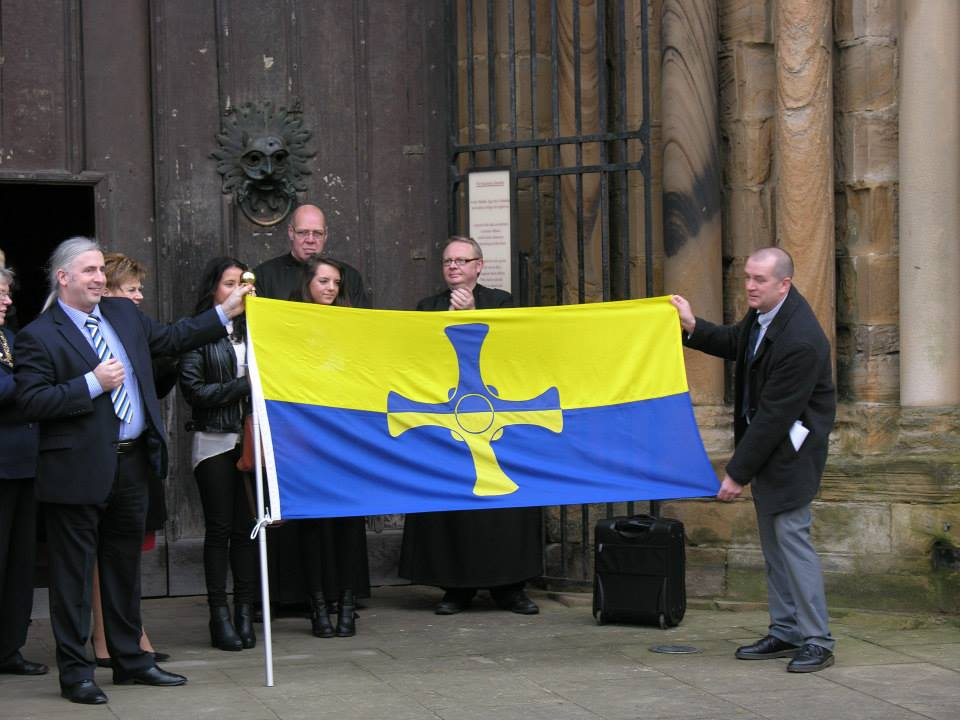
The unfurling of the county flag at Durham Cathedral in November 2013.

The colours blue and gold are associated with County Durham. They are used in the coat of arms and banner of arms of the diocese of Durham, which itself influenced the coat of arms and banner of arms of Durham County Council. The pectoral cross of St Cuthbert was either buried with him when he died in 687 or placed in his coffin in 698, when his sainthood was recognised. It was discovered in 1827 when his coffin was opened, and is now on display in Durham Cathedral.

The flag was designed by James Moffat and his daughters, Katie and Holly, from Chilton in the county. At the ceremony in which the flag was unfurled, James stated that “the design is simple. Holly’s favourite colour is yellow and Katie’s is blue which luckily coincides with our county’s historic colours. The St. Cuthbert’s cross was selected simply because, the first ever present my children bought me was a St. Cuthbert’s cross badge, on a trip with Chilton Primary School to Durham Cathedral in 2002.”

== Use ==
At the ceremony in which the flag was unfurled, the organiser of the competition to select it, Andy Strangeway, stated that it is "free, public symbol for all to use, especially on 20th March each year which is not only County Durham Day but also St Cuthbert’s birthday."

The flag has been flown at various locations within the historic county boundaries, including in Hetton-le-Hole, South Shields, and the wider metropolitan borough of South Tyneside. It was also flown from the building of the Department for Communities and Local Government on County Durham Day in 2014, and raised in Parliament Square in Westminster in 2022.

The road signs marking the historic boundary between County Durham and the North Riding of Yorkshire in the Borough of Stockton-on-Tees use the flag.

== Competition ==
The competition to design the flag was launched in July 2013 on the blog of Andy Strangeway, who had already established flags for the Ridings of Yorkshire. The competition noted that County Durham was the only historic county in the North of England without a flag, after the adoption of the flags of Cumberland and Westmorland in 2011 and 2012 respectively.

Six entries were shortlisted by councillors from Durham County Council, then put to a public vote. About 3,000 votes were received, with 26.51% cast for the winning design. The flag was unfurled at a ceremony in Durham Cathedral on 21 November 2013, during which it was blessed by Michael Sadgrove, the then dean of Durham. It was also registered with the Flag Institute, a charity that promotes vexillology in the United Kingdom.

=== Finalists ===
The five non-winning finalists of the flag competition were:

| Design | Flag | Symbolism |
|---|---|---|
| B | | Yellow, blue and purple are the three colours of County Durham. Yellow also represents the coast, blue the sea and rivers, black the county's coal seams, and purple is associated with the County Palatine. The Sanctuary Knocker in the centre played an important part in the history of Durham Cathedral. |
| C | | The yellow St Cuthbert’s cross set on a blue field along with the colliery wheel reflects the diverse cultural heritage of County Durham. |
| D | | The Venerable Bede recorded a banner of purple and gold which hung over the tomb of St Oswald of Northumbria. In the Middle Ages this banner was adopted by the first Earl of Northumberland with the purple replaced by the red; this design reverts to the original purple and gold, palatinate purple being the colour of County Durham. |
| E | | The flag is a stretched yellow Saint Cuthbert’s cross against a blue background, a form of cross and colour combination that are associated with the county. The five black diamonds on the cross symbolise the local coal industry. |
| F | | In the centre of the design is a St Cuthbert’s cross as the unifying emblem of the county. This is placed upon a fimbriated cross, in the style of other English county flags. Blue, purple and gold are the traditional colours of County Durham. |

== See also ==
- Flag of Kirkcudbrightshire, which also uses St Cuthbert's cross.
