= Durham University Men's Lacrosse Club =

Durham Palatinate
- Founded: ~2002
- University: Durham University
- Head coach: Dave Coldwell (3rd season)
- Stadium: Maiden Castle
- Location: Durham, England

Durham University Men's Lacrosse Club represents the University of Durham in the sport of lacrosse.

== History ==
Durham University Men's Lacrosse Club has existed for a number of years. The most recent incarnation of the club began in the early 2000s, with the club competing in the now defunct Anglo-Scottish League This was followed by competing in the initial BUSA precursor league & Regional Tournaments, and then being an ever present in the BUCS leagues.

From 2009, the university side has been supported by a number of American students who are encouraged to come to the UK to continue playing their chosen sport whilst pursuing a 1-year Master's degree. These students are expected to represent the university throughout the season, whilst also taking on some responsibility for development of existing a new players.

The club welcomes both experienced and new players, and has alumni playing for a variety of UK clubs. The club has participated in a number of tournaments, including the Bath 8s in 2007, and tours to tournaments in Dublin & Salou.

In 2012, Durham University Men's Lacrosse Club was awarded English Lacrosse High Performance University status.

In 2014, Durham was defeated by the England Men's National Team. In 2017, Durham defeated the England Men's National Team.

The team competes in the Cathedral Cup against Pellicani Bocconi Lacrosse.

The club successfully run a mixed tournament every year, playing without pitch boundaries. The club has also assisted in facilitating a large intra-mural mixed lacrosse league between the colleges of the university, providing further opportunities for new players to take up the game.

== Notable alumni ==
Durham Men's Lacrosse has a history of producing athletes who have been involved in lacrosse at the international level:

Name	College	Country
Pierre Mcilwee		France
Paul Lefebvre	St. Chads	France
Melih Yagci	St. John's	Turkey
Alex Majd	University	England
Dan Kelly		Ireland
Federico Galperti		Italy
Kyle Standiford		England
Andy Nicholls		Wales
Jeremy Nevin		Ireland
Jak Wawrzyniak	Ustinov	England
Dan Smith		England
Matthew Sheinfeld	Collingwood	Peru
Will Hardy		England
George Medd	Butler	England
Michael McTernan	Van Mildert	Ireland
Isaac Newland	Stevenson	Jamaica
Frank Vasconcelos		Portugal
Max Shafheutle-Evans		U-21 Wales
Trevor Jackson		Scotland
Henry Tucker	University	Bermuda
Jorge Salazar		Peru

In addition, several players have been involved with lacrosse at the professional level:

Name	College	Team
Jeremy Sieverts		Denver Outlaws (MLL), Whipsnakes (PLL)
Reagan Harding	Ustinov	Ohio Machine (MLL), Florida Launch (MLL), Saskatchewan Rush (NLL)
Vince Gravino	Hild Bede	Ohio Machine (MLL)
Alex Burkhead		Charlotte Hounds (MLL), Charlotte Copperheads (PLL)
Keegan Bal		Vancouver Stealth (NLL)
Pat Karole		Denver Outlaws (MLL)
Eli Gobrecht	Hild Bede	Vancouver Stealth (NLL) Denver Outlaws (MLL), Archers (PLL)
Jak Wawrzyniak	Ustinov	Boston Cannons (MLL)
Nico Capron		Charlotte Hounds (MLL)
Greg Weyl	St. Cuthbert's	Florida Launch (MLL)
