= Eton blue =

Shade of green used by Eton College

Colour coordinates
- Hex triplet: #A0D1CA
- sRGB^{B} (r, g, b): (160, 209, 202)
- HSV (h, s, v): (171°, 23%, 82%)
- CIELCh_{uv} (L, C, h): (80, 25, 179°)
- Source: Eton College
- ISCC–NBS descriptor: Light yellowish green
- B: Normalized to [0–255] (byte)

Eton blue is a shade of greenish blue or bluish green used since the early 19th century by sportsmen of Eton College. It is similar to the colour Cambridge blue used by the University of Cambridge.

Chelsea FC wore Eton blue from its founding in 1905 as the Earl Cadogan, who was the club's president and held the title Viscount Chelsea, was an Old Etonian. They changed to their darker shade of Royal Blue in 1907.

Eton blue is also used by Geelong Grammar School, a prestigious boarding school in Geelong, Australia, which has been dubbed as 'Australia's Eton', owing to its similarities with English public schools.

== See also ==
- List of colours
