= Sporting colours =

Sports awards at schools and universities in the UK

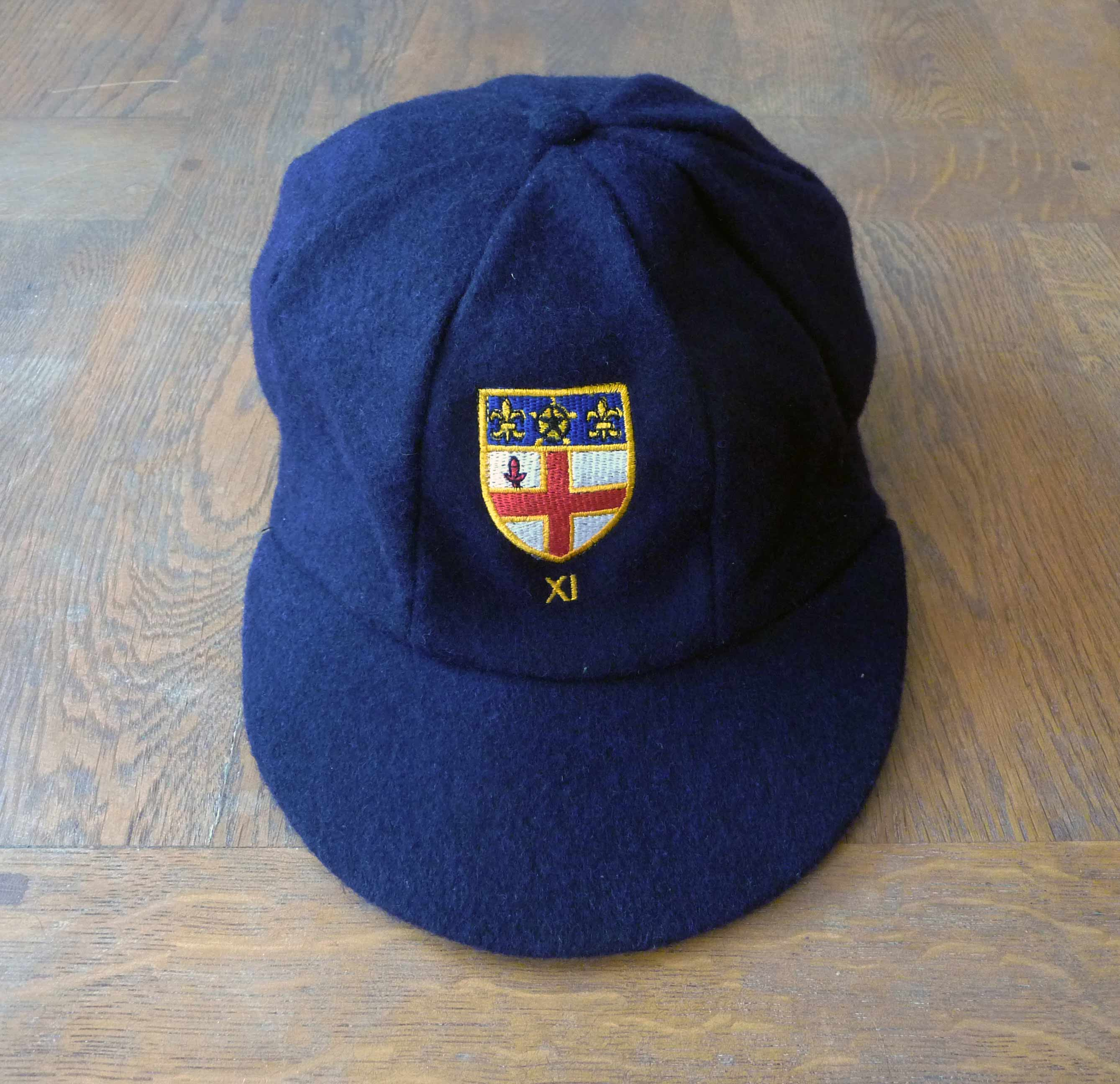
Pupils who are awarded Colours at Christ's Hospital school, receive a tie, and in the case of sporting colours awarded for cricket, they also receive a cricket cap with the school crest and cricket 'XI' embroidered at the front.

In Ireland and the United Kingdom, sporting colours or just colours (sometimes with a modifier, e.g. club colours or school colours) are awarded to members of a university or school who have excelled in a sport. Many schools do not limit their use to sport but may also give colours for academic excellence or non-sporting extra-curricular activities, Colours are traditionally indicated by the wearing of a special tie or blazer.

Many university colours are known by the name of the colour used, which is usually the colour worn by the university's sports teams, e.g. Blue at Oxford and Cambridge, Palatinate at Durham, Pink at Trinity College Dublin or Red at Bristol. These are similar to the varsity letters awarded by American universities.

The level of representation required for the award of a colour varies between the different schemes. A full Palatinate at Durham, a Royal Blue at Liverpool or Full Colours at Cardiff require a student to have represented their country, while at Oxford the requirement for a full Blue is to have represented the university in a varsity match against Cambridge in an eligible sport. In many colour award schemes, it is possible to receive a half colour. These are normally given for lower levels of achievement than a full colour.

== History ==
University colours were first introduced in the second University Boat Race between Oxford and Cambridge in 1836. Durham adopted palatinate purple for its degree hoods at about the same time. At Cambridge, teams would seek permission of the boat club to use their blue colour; by the 1860s the established sports with full blue status were rowing, cricket and athletics. In 1884, the rugby and football clubs awarded themselves blues following their varsity matches (against Oxford), leading to a debate at the Cambridge Union that was decisively lost by the boat club. The hockey club also gained full blue status (in 1894) before the system was formalised by the establishment of the blues committee in 1912. The award of Palatinates for sports at Durham dates to at least 1883, when the cricket "Eleven" were permitted to wear the "university coat" (i.e. blazer) of palatinate purple rather than the claret coat of the club, and the award of both Palatinates and half Palatinates was well established by the end of the century. Manchester adopted maroon in 1905. Trinity College Dublin adopted Pink in 1950.

== University colours ==
Different universities award different colours, often based on the colour worn by their athletes. Sometimes these are known by the colour used, but they may also simply be known as "colours". These include:

- Aberdeen: Blue
- Bath: Blue
- Birmingham: Blue
- Bristol: Red
- Cambridge: Blue
- Cardiff: Colours
- Dublin: Pink or Colours
- Dundee: Blue (with Colours as a lower-level below Half Blue)
- Durham: Palatinate
- Edinburgh: Colours
- Glasgow: Blue
- Heriot-Watt: Blue
- Leeds: Colours
- Liverpool: Blue or Colours (Note: A five-tier system of Royal Blue, University Blue, Full Colours, Half Colours and Club Colours)
- Loughborough: AU Colours
- Manchester (pre-2004): Maroon (Note: The present-day University of Manchester was created following the merger of UMIST and the Victoria University of Manchester in 2004. Before this point the VUM awarded Maroons and Half Maroons, having adopted the sporting colours of maroon and white in 1905. Since 2004 the university has not used maroon and white for sports kit, instead having kit in the university colours of purple and yellow. In recent years the university has awarded 'Performance Colours'.)
- Nottingham Trent: Colours
- Oxford: Blue
- Robert Gordon: Blue
- St Andrews: Blue or Colours (Note: A three-tier system of Full Blue, Half Blue and Colours)
- St Mary's: Blue
- Sheffield: Colours
- Stirling: Blue or Colours (Note: A three-tier system of Full Blue, Half Blue and Colours)
- UCL: Colours

== Gallery ==
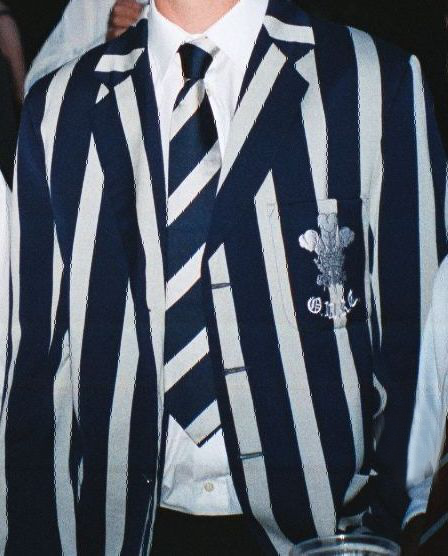
Oxford University, Oxford University Rifle Club Half Blue blazer and tie.

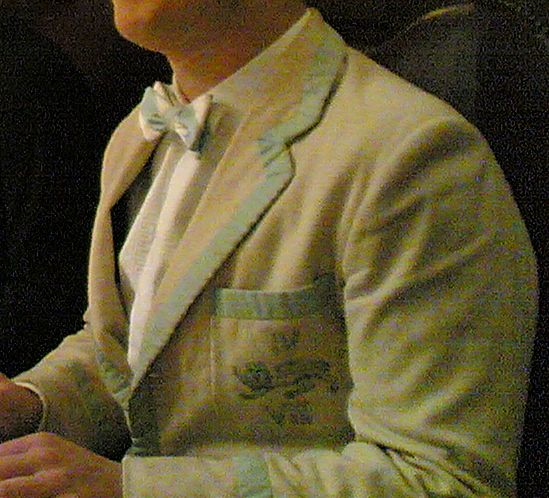
Cambridge University Half Blue blazer and bow tie.

An example of a blazer pocket from Carey Baptist Grammar School with school colours in umpiring and musical theatre, as well as house colours and music insignia. Pockets are a common method of displaying awards.

== See also ==
- School colors
