= Duke blue =

Color shade used by Duke University

Common connotations
- Duke University

Color coordinates
- Hex triplet: #012169
- sRGB^{B} (r, g, b): (1, 33, 105)
- HSV (h, s, v): (222°, 99%, 41%)
- CIELCh_{uv} (L, C, h): (16, 46, 261°)
- Source: Duke University
- ISCC–NBS descriptor: Deep blue
- B: Normalized to [0–255] (byte)

Duke blue is a dark blue color used in association with Duke University.

== History ==
The origins of Duke blue lie in the uniforms worn by the Duke (then Trinity College) football team in their first game against the University of North Carolina in 1888. These were a grayish dark blue, chosen by the team as an approximation of Yale blue to honor the college's president, John Franklin Crowell, a graduate of Yale who had introduced football at Trinity.

In 1961, Duke University President J. Deryl Hart recommended a standardization of the shades of blue used by the university when it was redesigning its academic gowns. In 1965, Duke's board of trustees officially adopted Prussian blue for official university use.

== Modern usage ==
Duke makes use of several shades of blue, with the official Duke blue, known as Duke Navy Blue, being the darkest of the official blues. The dark blue is used on the official university seal, but a lighter shade of blue, known as Duke Royal Blue (Hex: #00539B), has been used since 2009 on the Iron Duke logo, the logo of Duke Athletics.

== See also ==
- Yale blue
- Duke Blue Devils
- List of colors
