= Palatinate (colour) =

Shade of purple associated with Durham University and the City of Durham

Palatinate purple

Colour coordinates
- Hex triplet: #68246D
- sRGB^{B} (r, g, b): (104, 36, 109)
- CMYK^{H} (c, m, y, k): (51, 91, 0, 34)
- HSV (h, s, v): (296°, 67%, 43%)
- CIELCh_{uv} (L, C, h): (28, 48, 304°)
- Source: Durham University
- ISCC–NBS descriptor: Deep purple
- B: Normalized to [0–255] (byte); H: Normalized to [0–100] (hundred)

Palatinate blue

Colour coordinates
- Hex triplet: #0038A8
- sRGB^{B} (r, g, b): (0, 56, 168)
- CMYK^{H} (c, m, y, k): (100, 66, 0, 34)
- HSV (h, s, v): (220°, 100%, 66%)
- CIELCh_{uv} (L, C, h): (29, 83, 261°)
- Source: County of Durham
- B: Normalized to [0–255] (byte); H: Normalized to [0–100] (hundred)

Palatinate or palatinate purple is a purple colour associated with Durham University and the County and City of Durham. The term has been used to refer to a number of different shades of purple. The Oxford English Dictionary defines it as a "light purple or lavender colour", which is used for Durham (and Newcastle) academic hoods. For corporate purposes Durham University uses a darker shade.

A separate colour, 'palatinate blue', is derived from the coat of arms of County Durham. The name 'Palatinate' in both instances alludes to the historic status of Durham as a County Palatine.

== Use ==
Palatinate is widely used in the academic dress and sport kits of Durham University and in the faculties of medicine and law at Newcastle University (having been used for degrees in those faculties when Newcastle University was a college of Durham University). It was also formerly used (from 1894) in the BA and MA hoods of Trinity College (Connecticut), and the lavender colour used in the academic dress of the University of Portsmouth for degrees in architecture "is in fact Palatinate purple from Durham" according to its designer, Adrian Dorber. As used in academic dress, the colour is said to be "best described as 'a soft mauve'".

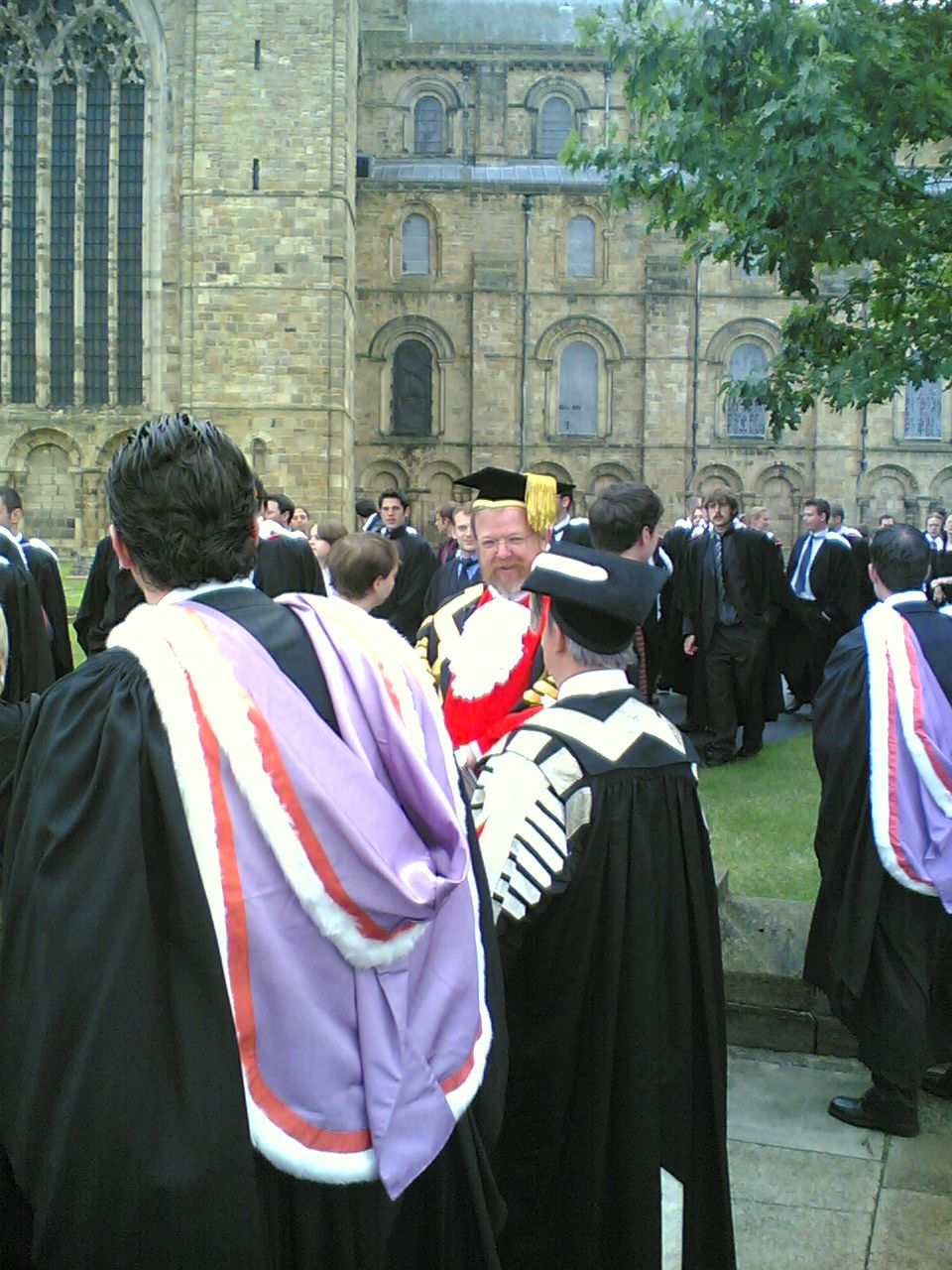
The Durham BSc hood, "Palatinate silk, bound with white fur, and with a scarlet band half-an-inch wide next to the fur".

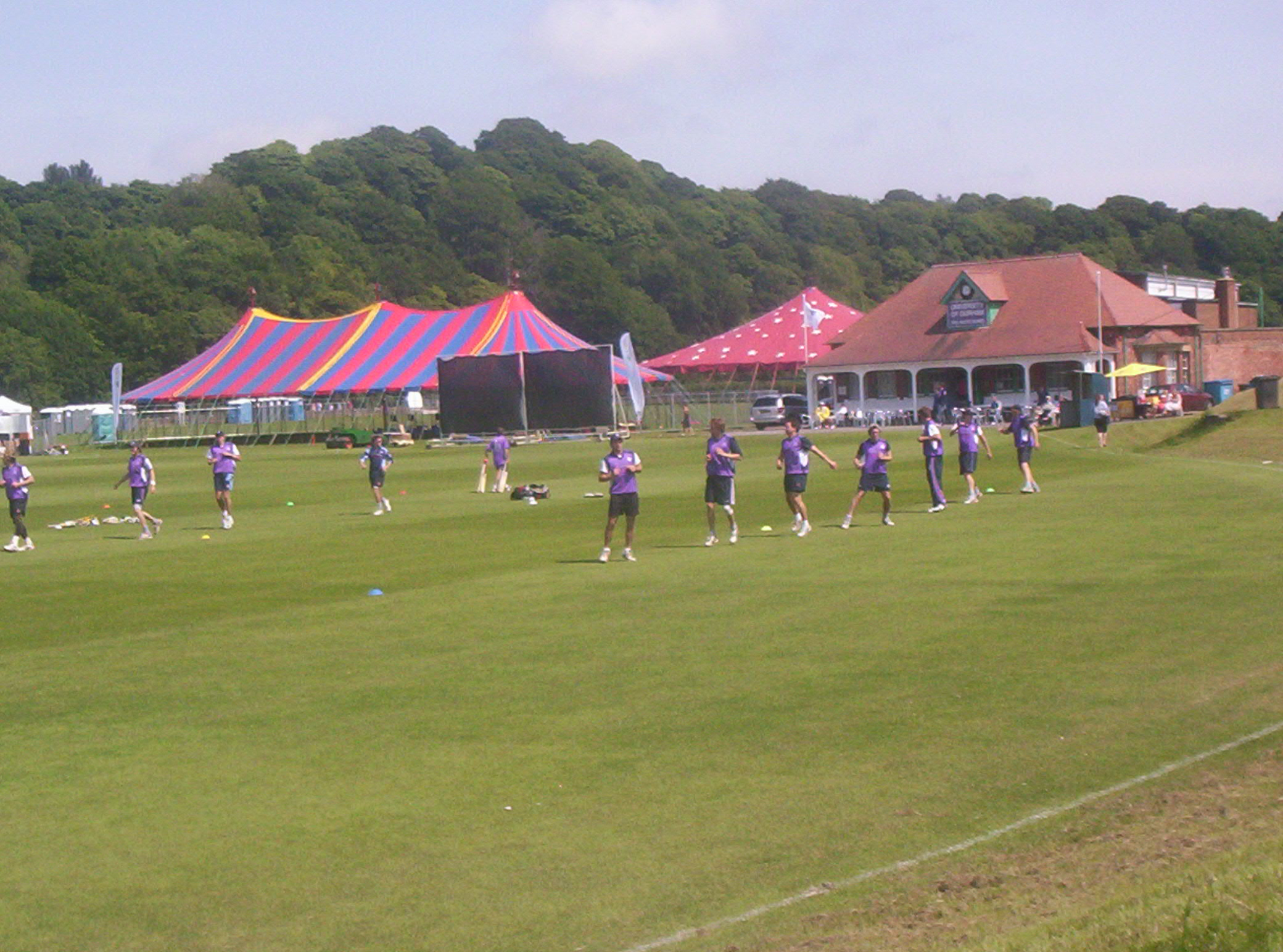
Durham University cricketers wearing palatinate kit for a Twenty20 match against Northumbria University at The Racecourse.

The choir of Durham Cathedral have worn robes of "the purple of the Palatinate" since the 1930s.

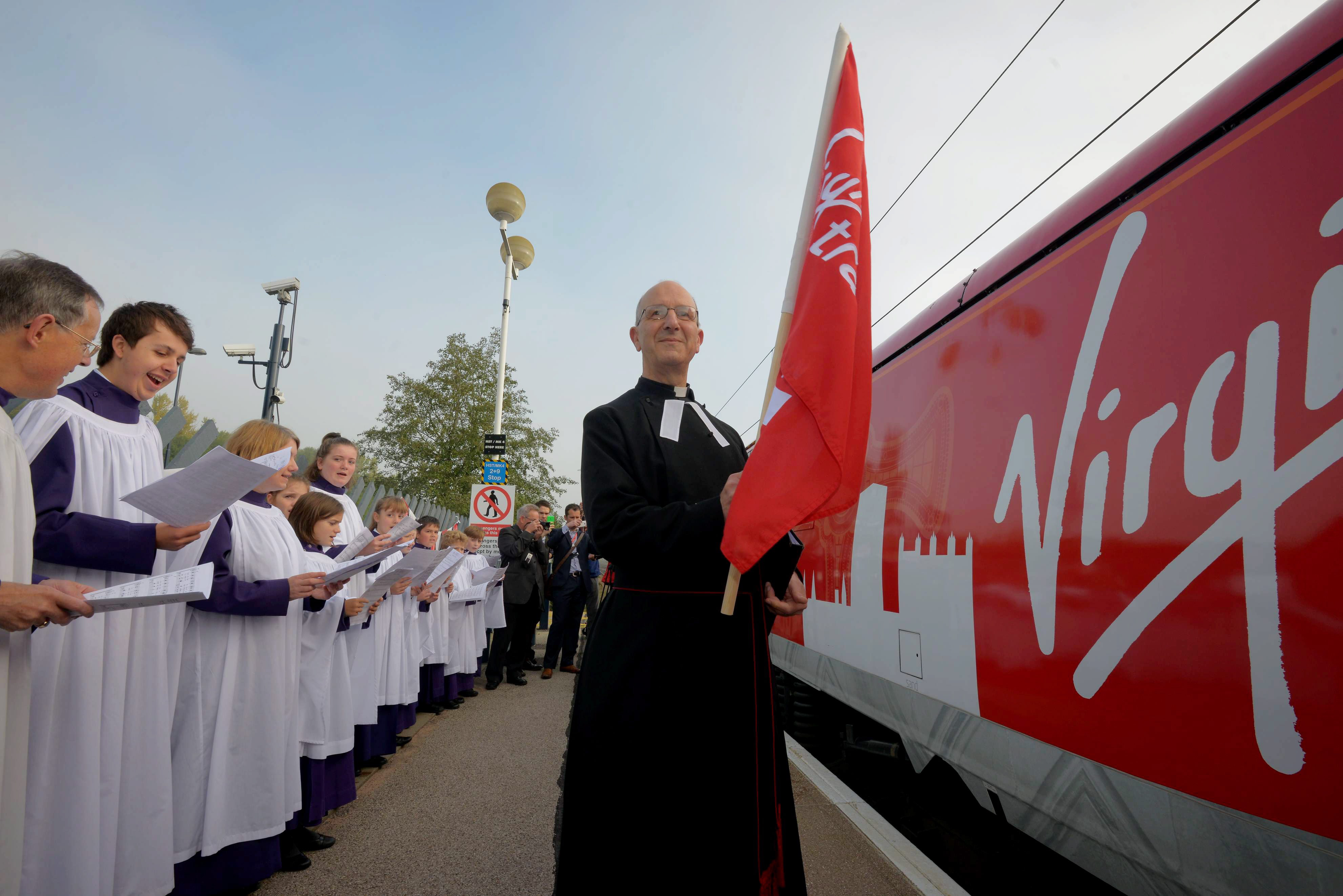
Durham Cathedral choir in their palatinate purple robes at Durham railway station

The scabbard of the civic sword of the City of Durham (dating from 1913) is described as being "of purple velvet, the colour of the old palatine of Durham".

Palatinate purple is also used as the name of some commercial products, including a photochromic dye from James Robinson Speciality Ingredients and a lipstick from Focallure.

== Origin and history ==
Accounts of its origin agree that the choice of palatinate purple as Durham University's colour relates to the key role played by William Van Mildert, the Bishop of Durham, in the foundation of the university (purple being the episcopal colour), as well as to the unique historical status of Durham County as a Palatinate, under the civil authority of the bishop, until Van Mildert's death in 1836. It was the first 'university colour' adopted by a British university for its academic dress.

C.E. Whiting's history of the university records the following story as being told to him by Revd Charles Whitley, Reader in Natural Philosophy at the University 1833-1854:

When the colour of the MA hood was discussed by Senate, he [Whitley] had proposed black and amber, but was outvoted on the grounds that people would call it 'Durham Mustard', a reference to the mustard factory then in existence in the city, and possibly to the popular saying that Durham was famous for 'old maids and mustard'. Mr Telfair, university tailor, afterwards produced a piece of a purple coat which had been worn by Bishop Van Mildert, and this colour was adopted for the MA hood.

— C.E. Whiting, The University of Durham 1832-1932

The Gentleman's Magazine, in an obituary in 1851 for Matthew Thompson, an artist and herald from Durham, stated that:

So completely was he [Thompson] at home in matters of taste that, as report goes, he was the person who suggested the purple of the Palatinate for the lining of the master's hood, making it differ from those of Oxford and Cambridge by a most appropriate distinction.

— The Gentleman's Magazine

An account, written sometime between 1876 and 1896, of Van Mildert's ceremonial entry into County Durham upon his election as bishop in 1826, refers to him wearing "a coat and waistcoat of the Palatinate purple".

In the mid-19th century, the university tailor referred to the colour used in the hoods as palatinate blue, despite it being "really a sort of purple".

A pseudonymous answer published in Notes and Queries in 1857 said that:

At Durham the M.A. hood is lined with silk of a peculiar colour, called "Palatinate Purple." It is the colour which the Bishops of Durham, as Counts Palatine, were entitled to wear, and differs not from the purple worn by other bishops. At the death of Bishop Van Mildert, in 1836, the Palatinate was separated from the See of Durham, and the peculiar colour, no longer required for the purpose for which it had been hitherto used, was adopted as a distinguishing characteristic of the University, of which Bishop Van Mildert, the last Bishop Count Palatine, was one of the munificent founders.

— M.A. of Oxford, Cambridge, and Durham, Notes and Queries, Volume 15

When Durham University Boat Club was formed in 1877, it adopted "a uniform of Palatinate purple, with oars (crossed) and the letters D.U.B.C as a badge". In 1883, Durham University Cricket Club began to award palatinates as their sporting colours, agreeing that "the Eleven should wear the University Coat, viz., Palatinate Purple with badge D.U.C.C. in place of the present claret coat." The rules also specified various conditions and "That the Captain with the Committee shall have the right of withdrawing the colours from any member of the Eleven not complying with the aforesaid rules." Later in the same year, Durham University Rugby Football Club adopted "a palatinate purple jersey with a badge in scarlet" for the first team.

During the Battle of Britain, the flight crews of No. 607 (County of Durham) RAF Squadron "all wore mauve, the County Palatinate colour" instead of the standard white flying overalls.

== Colour data ==
Palatinate purple (academic dress)

Colour coordinates
- Hex triplet: #A26BCD
- sRGB^{B} (r, g, b): (162, 107, 205)
- HSV (h, s, v): (274°, 48%, 80%)
- CIELCh_{uv} (L, C, h): (55, 74, 286°)
- Source: Shaw (1966)
- B: Normalized to [0–255] (byte); H: Normalized to [0–100] (hundred)

The precise colour of palatinate purple used by the university has varied with time. Its most long-established usage is in the university's academic dress and sporting colours, both of which use a significantly paler shade than that used by the university for corporate purposes.

The palatinate purple used for the academic robes is said by Shaw (1966) to be British Colour Council No. 177 "Crocus" from the second (1951) edition of the Dictionary of Colour Standards. BCC 177 Crocus has CIE 1931 colour space values of X=0.308, Y=0.223, Z=0.469 with a brightness factor of 7.76% under CIE Standard Illuminant B. This is equivalent to CMYK: 21%, 48%, 0%, 20%, RGB 162, 107, 205 or HEX #A26BCD.

The shade of purple used by Durham University in its corporate branding from 2019 is Pantone 255C with the digital translations: CMYK: 51, 91, 0, 34 and RGB: 104, 36, 109 (Hex: 68246D). Prior to this, Pantone 255C was used with the digital translation CMYK: 51, 91, 0, 34 but RGB: 126, 49, 123 (Hex: 7E317B) from 2005 to 2019 and a shade closer to plum prior to 2005. The corporate branding prior to 2019 also included a lighter purple, close in appearance to the palatinate silk used in the academic dress, as one of the secondary corporate colours. This is Pantone 257C; CMYK: 15, 38, 0, 0; RGB: 216, 172, 214; Hex: D8ACE0.

Palatinate Blue, used in the Flag of County Durham is: Pantone number 286 (equivalent to CMYK: 100%, 66%, 0%, 34%; RGB: 0, 56, 168; Hex: 0038A8).

== See also ==
- List of colours
- Oxford blue
- Cambridge blue
