= Cambridge Blue (colour) =

Colour commonly used by sports teams from the University of Cambridge

Colour coordinates
- Hex triplet: #85B09A
- sRGB^{B} (r, g, b): (133, 176, 154)
- HSV (h, s, v): (149°, 24%, 69%)
- CIELCh_{uv} (L, C, h): (68, 25, 150°)
- B: Normalized to [0–255] (byte)

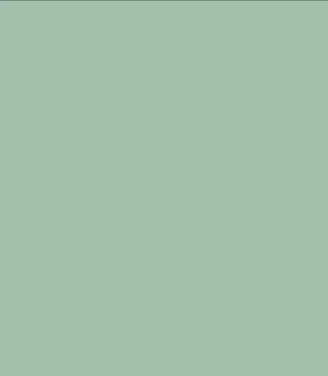
Cambridge Blue

Cambridge Blue is the shade of green commonly used by sports teams from the University of Cambridge. There is contextual and historical variation. The colour used since the mid-20th century by Cambridge University Boat Club is greener than that used by Cambridge University R.U.F.C. (in rugby union). This rowing colour was created when Alf Twinn, the boatman from 1934 to 1984, added more yellow to this shade, reportedly to distinguish it from the rugby club's colour.

== Background and reinforcement ==
The Cambridge University official colour style guide defines Cambridge Blue as Pantone 557 C; with RGB values of R 133, G 176, B 154.

This colour has evolved into a medium tone of spring green. Spring green colours are colours with an h code (hue code) of between 135 and 165; this colour has an h code of 140, putting it within the range of spring green colours on the RGB colour wheel.

University of Cambridge Development and Alumni Relations has endorsed a selection of clothing retailers restricting their goods to proven alumni. Their main colours range from Cambridge Navy: with red bands, or the university crests; through to a shade of Cambridge Blue (sometimes with Cambridge Navy bands) in the case of the main silk tie achieved through darkened Cambridge Blue and white interweaving.

Other colours selected for the iconic bands and stripes of the house styles are white, black, and Pantone 285 (blue), 158 (orange), 369 (green), 513 (purple) and 7466 (teal). Pantone 032 (red) and 109 (yellow) feature in the official University coat of arms.

A well-cited explanation to the origin of the colour goes back to the second Boat Race, held in 1836. Three of the participants in the Cambridge boat were from Gonville & Caius College. They thus sourced or had a light blue ribbon, the colour of their boat club. Given Cambridge won by 20 lengths, the University Boat Club asked the college whether the university could adopt the colour as well. In their training kit and at the formal socials the boat club recognises its full first boat participants in that they may wear blue's silk tie, and half-blues (the reserve boat's competitors) have their own version which is banded half-white.

== Usage ==
The jerseys of the Australian NSW Waratahs and the New Zealand Northland Rugby Union have been referred to incorrectly as Cambridge Blue since 1892 and 1920, but that may have been due to copying other Cambridge sporting teams and not the university colours. Their colours are now known as sky blue.

Other groups that refer to the original colour, along with Oxford Blue are Brisbane Grammar School, Wesley College, Colombo, Wycombe Wanderers F.C., the Toronto Argonauts of the Canadian Football League, Argonaut Rowing Club, Toronto and The King's Own Calgary Regiment.

Cranbrook School, Sydney use Cambridge Blue as the house colour for Davidson.

== Bailiffs of the city ==
The four bailiffs of the city wear an aquamarine gown when accompanying the charitable, ceremonial Mayor who wears a red-and-black gown-coat. These bailiffs' colours are shared with some other boroughs/cities. It is an urban myth that Cambridge City Council emulates the university's colours in its coat of arms, awarded in 1575, to colour the water representing the Cam in which three ships appear away from bare metal (silver). It is currently a far more common symbol – its crest – is in dark blue.

== See also ==
- Blue (university sport)
  - Blue (university sport) § University of Cambridge
- Oxford Blue (colour)
- Palatinate (colour)
- List of colours
