= Medallion Shield =

Irish rugby union competition

- Sport: Rugby union
- Founded: 1910
- No. of teams: 38 (season 2013-14)
- Most recent champion: Wallace High School (2025-26)
- Most titles: Royal Belfast Academical Institution 37 Won Outright
- Related competitions: Ulster Schools Cup
- Website: Ulster Rugby; Danske Bank Schools Cup

Notes
- Also includes subsidiary competitions - Medallion Plate, Medallion Bowl and Medallion Trophy

The Medallion Shield is an annual rugby union competition involving schools affiliated to the Ulster Branch of the Irish Rugby Football Union. The competition is open to all schools within Ulster, but only schools from within Northern Ireland currently enter, with no entries from schools situated in the three Ulster counties within the Republic of Ireland.

The competition has been contested continuously since its inception in 1910 and, in that time, fourteen different schools have secured at least a shared win of the shield. Teams entering the Medallion Shield are composed of boys who are under 15 years of age at the start of the school year. Entry in 2012-13 stood at 38 schools.

Royal Belfast Academical Institution have won the most titles, having 37 Won Outright titles and 3 shared.

The 2024 competition resulted in a final between Sullivan Upper and Royal Belfast Academical Institution with RBAI winning 36–10.RBAI have now won the competition 37 times outright and shared it 3 times.

== Foundation and growth ==
It was reported in 1909 that discussions had taken place between Belfast Royal Academy, Campbell College, Methodist College and Royal Belfast Academical Institution about setting up a rugby junior competition for pupils with an age qualification given as under fifteen years of age on 1 November. The success of the Leinster Schools Junior Cup which had started that year had prompted these discussions. Henry McIntosh, the Headmaster of Methodist College and respected rugby coach, was the main driving force behind the idea.

In 1910 Methodist College and Royal Belfast Academical Institution proceeded with the competition and for the first five years only these two schools competed. The third school to join was Royal School Dungannon in 1915. Bangor Grammar School entered for the first time in 1916, with Ballymena Academy and Coleraine Academical Institution following in 1917.

In 1977 the organising committee of Belfast Royal Academy, Methodist College Belfast, Royal Belfast Academical Institution and Royal School Dungannon ceded control of the competition to the Ulster Branch of the Irish Rugby Football Union.

== Trophy ==
Initially without a trophy, a medal was presented to the winning captain at the conclusion of the second final in 1911. The original Medallion Shield was presented by the Governors of Methodist College with the medal mounted on the shield. When the original shield was filled with the names of winners, the Governors also provided a replacement shield. The original shield is on exhibit and can be viewed at the Methodist College Heritage Centre.

== Venue of finals ==
All finals since 1973 had been played at Ravenhill. In 2014 the final was staged at the Queen's University Arena because of the ongoing development work at Ravenhill. Prior to 1973, the most commonly used venues were the North of Ireland grounds on the Ormeau Road in Belfast and the former Royal Belfast Academical Institution grounds at Orangefield, Belfast.

== Future international players ==
Over the years a selection of players who went on to win international caps appeared in the Medallion Shield final. One future international appeared in the first ever final in 1910 with James B O'Neill a member of the victorious Methodist College team. He would win one cap for Ireland in 1920.

Further examples of future international players include:

- Arthur Coates Douglas played for Royal Belfast Academical Institution in the 1917 final, won 5 caps for Ireland.
- Dick Milliken captained the Bangor Grammar School team to victory in 1966 appeared 14 times for Ireland and 4 British & Irish Lion appearances.
- Niall Malone played for Methodist College Belfast in the 1986 final, won 3 caps for Ireland.
- Jonny Bell played for Coleraine Academical Institution in the 1989 final, won 36 caps for Ireland.
- David Irwin played for Royal Belfast Academical Institution in the 1974 final, and was capped 25 times for Ireland and toured with the British Lions in 1983.

== Format ==
Until 2004 the Medallion Shield was competed for through an open draw, and since then a seeding system has been employed to determine the point at which a school enters the competition.

A Medallion Plate competition for first round losers was introduced in 1986.

The competition took on a new format in 2005 with further minor changes made since. Each team is assigned to a seeding group which determines the stage at which that team joins the competition. Each stage is run on a single tie knock-out basis, with replays for drawn games when necessary.

The structure since the 2009–10 season is as follows:

- Stage 1. Weakest twelve teams enter for round 1. If necessary, a preliminary round will be played to establish these twelve teams. The six winners progress to round 2. The losers enter the Medallion Trophy together with the losers of the round 2 fixtures. The matches are determined by an open draw.
- Stage 2. A further ten teams enter together with the six winners from round 1. The matches in round 2 are determined by an open draw. The eight winners progress to round 3. The eight losers join the six losers from round 1 and any preliminary round losers and compete for the Medallion Trophy.
- Stage 3. A further eight teams enter together with the eight winners from round 2. The matches in round 3 are determined by an open draw. The eight winners progress to round 4. The eight losers contest for the Medallion Bowl.
- Stage 4. The top eight seeded teams join the remaining eight winners from round 3. The matches in round 4 are determined by an open draw. The winners proceed to the quarter-finals, semi finals and final. The eight losers in round 4 play for the Medallion Plate.

== Performance by school ==
(Table incomplete; one finalist missing - 1934)

Performance table
School	Titles	Shared titles	Runners-up	Total finals	Last title	Last final
Royal Belfast Academical Institution	38	3	16	57	2025	2025
Methodist College Belfast	36	3	20	59	2019	2019
Coleraine Academical Institution	8	1	12	21	2000^{†}	2000
Campbell College	5	1	5	10	2022	2022
Belfast Royal Academy	4	2	10	16	1979	1994
Royal School Dungannon	3	0	10	13	1994	1994
Regent House, Newtownards	3	0	5	8	1998	2008
Bangor Grammar School	3	0	4	7	1985	1986
Ballymena Academy	2	2	7	11	2018	2022
Sullivan Upper School	2	0	2	3	2011	2026
Rainey Endowed School	1	0	2	3	1977	1993
Ballyclare High School	1	0	0	1	1990	1990
The Royal School, Armagh	1	0	0	1	2017	2017
Wallace High School	1	1	4	6	2026	2026
Annadale Grammar School^{‡}	0	3	1	4	1967^{†}	1967
Belfast Boys' Model School	0	0	1	1	N/A	1964
Belfast High School	0	0	1	1	N/A	1980
Foyle College	0	0	1	1	N/A	1939
Larne Grammar School	0	0	1	1	N/A	1955
Limavady Grammar School	0	0	1	1	N/A	2011
Friends' School Lisburn	0	0	2	2	N/A	2025

^{†} denotes a shared win
^{‡} Annadale Grammar School became Wellington College in a merger in 1990.

== Finals ==
=== 1910s ===
Year	Venue	Winner			Runner-up	Notes
1910	NIFC Ormeau	Methodist College	11	0	Royal Belfast Academical Institution	
1911	NIFC Ormeau	Royal Belfast Academical Institution	32	0	Methodist College	
1912	NIFC Ormeau	Royal Belfast Academical Institution	6	5	Methodist College	
1913	NIFC Ormeau	Royal Belfast Academical Institution	15	3	Methodist College	
1914	NIFC Ormeau	Methodist College	10	9	Royal Belfast Academical Institution	
1915	NIFC Ormeau	Royal Belfast Academical Institution	25	5	Methodist College	
1916	NIFC Ormeau	Royal Belfast Academical Institution	42	0	Methodist College	
1917	NIFC Ormeau	Royal Belfast Academical Institution	27	0	Royal School Dungannon	
1918		Royal School Dungannon	16	3	Methodist College	
1919		Royal School Dungannon	8	0	Methodist College	

=== 1920s ===
Year	Venue	Winner			Runner-up	Notes
1920		Royal Belfast Academical Institution	29	0	Royal School Dungannon	
1921		Royal Belfast Academical Institution	42	3	Royal School Dungannon	
1922		Royal Belfast Academical Institution	26	0	Methodist College	
1923		Royal Belfast Academical Institution	16	0	Royal School Dungannon	
1924		Methodist College	3	0	Royal School Dungannon	
1925		Royal Belfast Academical Institution	20	0	Royal School Dungannon	
1926		Royal Belfast Academical Institution	14	0	Methodist College	
1927		Methodist College	3	0	Ballymena Academy	
1928		Methodist College	25	0	Bangor Grammar School	
1929		Methodist College	12	3	Royal School Dungannon	

=== 1930s ===
Year	Venue	Winner			Runner-up	Notes
1930		Royal Belfast Academical Institution	32	0	Bangor Grammar School	
1931		Royal Belfast Academical Institution	12	0	Methodist College	
1932		Methodist College	15	3	Royal Belfast Academical Institution	
1933		Royal Belfast Academical Institution	28	0	Royal School Dungannon	
1934		Methodist College				
1935		Coleraine Academical Institution	10	0	Royal Belfast Academical Institution	
1936		Bangor Grammar School	5	3	Methodist College	
1937	Coleraine	Coleraine Academical Institution	8	3	Methodist College	
1938		Coleraine Academical Institution	27	0	Royal School Dungannon	
1939		Royal Belfast Academical Institution	11	0	Foyle College	

=== 1940s ===
Year	Venue	Winner			Runner-up	Notes
1940		Methodist College	9	0	Coleraine Academical Institution	
1941		Methodist College	8	0	Royal Belfast Academical Institution	
1942	RBAI Orangefield	Royal Belfast Academical Institution	6	0	Coleraine Academical Institution	
1943		Royal Belfast Academical Institution	25	3	Coleraine Academical Institution	
1944	Ballymena	Coleraine Academical Institution	6	0	Methodist College Belfast	
1945		Methodist College	6	0	Royal Belfast Academical Institution	
1946		Methodist College	9	0	Royal Belfast Academical Institution	
1947	RBAI Orangefield	Methodist College	6	3	Royal Belfast Academical Institution	
1948		Methodist College	8	3	Coleraine Academical Institution	
1949		Methodist College	6	3	Coleraine Academical Institution	

=== 1950s ===
Year	Venue	Winner			Runner-up	Notes
1950		Coleraine Academical Institution	3	0	Methodist College	
1951		Ballymena Academy & Royal Belfast Academical Institution	3	3	TROPHY SHARED	Replay - Game 1: 0-0
1952		Royal Belfast Academical Institution	3	0	Methodist College	
1953		Royal Belfast Academical Institution			Methodist College	
1954		Annadale Grammar School & Methodist College			TROPHY SHARED	
1955		Royal Belfast Academical Institution	14	3	Larne Grammar School	
1956		Royal Belfast Academical Institution	3	0	Belfast Royal Academy	Replay - Game 1: 3-3
1957		Methodist College	3	0	Royal Belfast Academical Institution	
1958		Royal Belfast Academical Institution	14	0	Belfast Royal Academy	
1959		Royal Belfast Academical Institution	5	3	Coleraine Academical Institution	

=== 1960s ===
Year	Venue	Winner			Runner-up	Notes
1960		Annadale Grammar School & Royal Belfast Academical Institution	0	0	TROPHY SHARED	
1961		Royal Belfast Academical Institution	6	0	Annadale Grammar School	
1962		Methodist College	8	0	Belfast Royal Academy	
1963		Coleraine Academical Institution	8	0	Ballymena Academy	
1964		Methodist College	3	0	Belfast Boys' Model School	
1965		Belfast Royal Academy	9	0	Royal Belfast Academical Institution	
1966		Bangor Grammar School	5	3	Rainey Endowed School	
1967		Annadale Grammar School & Belfast Royal Academy	0	0	TROPHY SHARED	
1968		Belfast Royal Academy	9	3	Coleraine Academical Institution	
1969		Ballymena Academy & Belfast Royal Academy	5	5	TROPHY SHARED	

=== 1970s ===
Year	Venue	Winner			Runner-up	Notes
1970	Ballyclare	Ballymena Academy	9	6	Methodist College	
1971		Methodist College	8	3	Regent House, Newtownards	
1972		Methodist College & Royal Belfast Academical Institution	14	14	TROPHY SHARED	
1973	Ravenhill	Methodist College	6	3	Belfast Royal Academy	
1974	Ravenhill	Methodist College	16	4	Royal Belfast Academical Institution	
1975	Hyde Park Mallusk	Coleraine Academical Institution	7	4	Regent House, Newtownards	
1976		Regent House, Newtownards	6	3	Bangor Grammar School	
1977		Rainey Endowed School	10	6	Methodist College	
1978	Ballymena RFC	Belfast Royal Academy	7	3	Coleraine Academical Institution	
1979	Ravenhill	Belfast Royal Academy	9	4	Royal Belfast Academical Institution	

=== 1980s ===
Year	Venue	Winner			Runner-up	Notes
1980	Ravenhill	Royal Belfast Academical Institution	15	0	Belfast High School	
1981	Ravenhill	Royal Belfast Academical Institution	8	6	Belfast Royal Academy	
1982	Ravenhill	Royal Belfast Academical Institution	14	3	Campbell College	
1983	Ravenhill	Methodist College	10	8	Royal Belfast Academical Institution	
1984	Ravenhill	Campbell College	6	4	Belfast Royal Academy	
1985	Ravenhill	Bangor Grammar School	11	6	Campbell College	
1986	Ravenhill	Methodist College	7	4	Bangor Grammar School	
1987	Ravenhill	Regent House, Newtownards	11	3	Belfast Royal Academy	
1988	Ravenhill	Methodist College	3	0	Coleraine Academical Institution	
1989	Ravenhill	Coleraine Academical Institution	10	3	Belfast Royal Academy	

=== 1990s ===
Year	Venue	Winner			Runner-up	Notes
1990	Ravenhill	Ballyclare High School	8	4	Coleraine Academical Institution	
1991	Ravenhill	Methodist College	20	0	Royal School Dungannon	
1992	Ravenhill	Royal Belfast Academical Institution	30	3	Belfast Royal Academy	
1993	Ravenhill	Campbell College	15	10	Rainey Endowed School	
1994	Ravenhill	Royal School Dungannon	17	13	Belfast Royal Academy	
1995	Ravenhill	Methodist College	21	11	Campbell College	
1996	Ravenhill	Methodist College	12	6	Royal Belfast Academical Institution	
1997	Ravenhill	Royal Belfast Academical Institution	17	7	Methodist College	
1998	Ravenhill	Regent House, Newtownards	21	15	Coleraine Academical Institution	
1999	Ravenhill	Methodist College	18	12	Coleraine Academical Institution	

=== 2000s ===
Year	Venue	Winner			Runner-up	Notes
2000	Ravenhill	Methodist College & Coleraine Academical Institution	18	18	TROPHY SHARED	
2001	Ravenhill	Methodist College	15	10	Ballymena Academy	
2002	Ravenhill	Sullivan Upper School	10	8	Regent House, Newtownards	
2003	Ravenhill	Methodist College	21	3	Wallace High School, Lisburn	
2004	Ravenhill	Royal Belfast Academical Institution	11	6	Methodist College	
2005	Ravenhill	Methodist College	18	15	Royal Belfast Academical Institution	
2006	Ravenhill	Methodist College	25	9	Ballymena Academy	
2007	Ravenhill	Methodist College	15	10	Regent House, Newtownards	
2008	Ravenhill	Royal Belfast Academical Institution	22	21	Regent House, Newtownards	
2009	Ravenhill	Methodist College	12	10	Campbell College	

=== 2010s ===
Year	Location	Winner			Runner-up	Notes
2010	Ravenhill	Campbell College & Wallace High School	10	10	TROPHY SHARED	
2011	Ravenhill	Sullivan Upper School	17	0	Limavady Grammar School	
2012	Ravenhill	Methodist College Belfast	10	7	Wallace High School	
2013	Ravenhill	Campbell College	17	0	Wallace High School	
2014	Queen's University	Royal Belfast Academical Institution	12	10	Ballymena Academy	
2015	Ravenhill Stadium	Royal Belfast Academical Institution	13	5	Wallace High School	
2016	Ravenhill Stadium	Royal Belfast Academical Institution	22	8	Wallace High School	
2017	Ravenhill Stadium	The Royal School, Armagh	10	6	Friends' School, Lisburn	
2018	Ravenhill Stadium	Ballymena Academy	10	8	Campbell College	
2019	Ravenhill Stadium	Methodist College	17	12	Ballymena Academy	

=== 2020s ===
Year	Location	Winner			Runner-up	Notes
2020	Ravenhill Stadium	Campbell College	20	15	Royal Belfast Academical Institution	
2021	Competition cancelled due to the COVID-19 pandemic					
2022	Upper Malone	Campbell College	23	5	Ballymena Academy	
2023	Ravenhill Stadium	Royal Belfast Academical Institution	10	7	Ballymena Academy	
2024	Ravenhill Stadium	Royal Belfast Academical Institution	36	10	Sullivan Upper School	
2025	Ravenhill Stadium	Royal Belfast Academical Institution	38	7	Friends' School Lisburn	
2026	Ravenhill Stadium	Wallace High School	19	17	Sullivan Upper School	

== Medallion Plate ==
=== 1980s ===
- 1986 Ballymena Academy 15-0 Rainey Endowed School
- 1987 Larne Grammar School 10-8 Coleraine Academical Institution
- 1988 (???? v Belfast High School)
- 1989 Royal School Dungannon 21-0 Sullivan Upper School

=== 1990s ===
- 1990 Campbell College 15-6 Coleraine Boys' Secondary School
- 1991 Wallace High School 14-0 Antrim Grammar School
- 1992 Ballyclare High School 7-6 Royal School Dungannon
- 1993 Bangor Grammar School 19-5 Antrim Grammar School
- 1994 Omagh Academy 10-5 Portadown College
- 1995 Ballymena Academy 22-6 Foyle College
- 1996 Rainey Endowed School 15-0 Portadown College
- 1997 Ballyclare High School 20-15 Foyle and Londonderry College
- 1998 Royal Belfast Academical Institution 30-7 Larne Grammar School
- 1999 Ballyclare High School 19-12 Larne Grammar School

=== 2000s ===
- 2000 Rainey Endowed School 13-6 Grosvenor Grammar School
- 2001 Royal Belfast Academical Institution 22-7 Dalriada School
- 2002 Campbell College 17-12 Portadown College
- 2003 Ballyclare High School 20-17 Portora Royal School
- 2004 Wallace High School 27-22 Coleraine Academical Institution
- 2005 Campbell College 17-10 The Royal School, Armagh
- 2006 Royal Belfast Academical Institution 28-5 Sullivan Upper School
- 2007 The Royal School, Armagh 10-5 Ballymena Academy
- 2008 Belfast Royal Academy 22-0 Foyle and Londonderry College
- 2009 Wallace High School 37-22 Sullivan Upper School

=== 2010s ===
- 2010 Dromore High School 12-12 Limavady Grammar School
- 2011 Methodist College Belfast 26-10 Ballymena Academy
- 2012 Ballymena Academy 34-10 Dalriada School
- 2013 Methodist College Belfast 63-3 Down High School
- 2014 Coleraine Academical Institution 24-21 Banbridge Academy
- 2015 Ballymena Academy 17-5 Down High School
- 2016 Sullivan Upper School 12-10 Campbell College
- 2017 Belfast Royal Academy 0-17 Sullivan Upper School
- 2018 The Royal School, Armagh 25 - 0 Sullivan Upper School
- 2019 Grosvenor Grammar School 8 - 7 Rainey Endowed School

=== 2020s ===
- 2020 Methodist College Belfast 0-0 Dromore High School (Cancelled due to COVID-19)
- 2022 Sullivan Upper School 22-12 Rainey Endowed School
- 2023 Methodist College 22-5 Royal School Dungannon
- 2024
- 2025 Down High School 32-13 Rainey Endowed School
- 2026 Campbell College 24-15 Ballymena Academy

== Medallion Bowl ==
Year	Winner		Runner-up	Notes
2026	Belfast Royal Academy	22-12	Friends' School, Lisburn	
2025	Royal School, Armagh	14-3	Enniskillen Royal Grammar School	
2024	Rainey Endowed School	22-21	Portadown College	
2023	Coleraine Grammar School	52-12	Antrim Grammar School	
2022	Banbridge Academy	19-10	Limavady Grammar School	
2021	Competition cancelled due to the COVID-19 pandemic			
2020	Down High School	13-6	Ballyclare High School	
2019	Omagh Academy	17-11	Down High School	
2018	Bangor Grammar School	39-14	Limavady Grammar School	
2017	Enniskillen Royal Grammar School	31-3	Down High School	
2016	Dalriada School	13-10	Bangor Grammar School	
2015	Coleraine Academical Institution	7-3	Grosvenor Grammar School	
2014	Bangor Grammar School	37-7	Belfast High School	
2013	Grosvenor Grammar School	17-10	Carrickfergus Grammar School	
2012	Carrickfergus Grammar School	14-7	Rainey Endowed School	
2011	Rainey Endowed School	27-7	Grosvenor Grammar School	
2010	Ballymena Academy	3-0	Sullivan Upper School	
2009	Dalriada School	19-17	Grosvenor Grammar School	
2008	Banbridge Academy	17-8	Belfast High School	
2007	Omagh Academy	5-0	Bangor Grammar School	
2006	Omagh Academy	13-0	Rainey Endowed School	
2005	Limavady Grammar	20-7	Foyle College	

=== Wins by School ===
Medallion Bowl
School	Wins	Runner-Up	Last Won
Omagh Academy	3	—N/a	2019
Bangor Grammar School	2	2	2018
Rainey Endowed School	2	2	2024
Banbridge Academy	2	—N/a	2022
Coleraine Grammar School^{†}	2	—N/a	2023
Dalriada School	2	—N/a	2016
Grosvenor Grammar School	1	3	2013
Limavady Grammar	1	2	2005
Down High School	1	2	2020
Carrickfergus Grammar School	1	1	2012
Enniskillen Royal Grammar School	1	1	2017
Ballymena Academy	1	—N/a	2010
Royal School, Armagh	1	—N/a	2025
Belfast High School	—N/a	2	—N/a
Antrim Grammar School	—N/a	1	—N/a
Ballyclare High School	—N/a	1	—N/a
Foyle College	—N/a	1	—N/a
Portadown College	—N/a	1	—N/a
Sullivan Upper School	—N/a	1	—N/a

== Medallion Trophy ==
Year	Winner		Runner-up	Notes
2026	Cambridge House Grammar School	24-14	Belfast High School	
2025	Belfast High School	31-7	Banbridge Academy	
2024	Banbridge Academy	24-21	Belfast High School	
2023	Banbridge Academy	12-12	Enniskillen Royal Grammar School	
2022	Dromore High	24-12	Omagh Academy	
2021	Competition cancelled due to the COVID-19 pandemic			
2020	Cambridge House Grammar School	10-8	Banbridge Academy	
2019	Enniskillen Royal Grammar School	15-5	Foyle College	
2018	Larne Grammar School	22-15	Carrickfergus Grammar School	
2017	Ballyclare Secondary School	12-10	Grosvenor Grammar School	
2016	Foyle College	16-12	Cambridge House Grammar School	
2015	Omagh Academy	22-0	Strabane Academy	
2014	Larne Grammar School	3-3	Rainey Endowed School	
2013	Lurgan College	8-0	Dalriada School	
2012	Wellington College Belfast	17-8	Grosvenor Grammar School	
2011	Dalriada School	12-0	Foyle and Londonderry College	
2010	Foyle and Londonderry College	38-7	Dalriada School	
2009	Limavady Grammar School	28-3	Downshire School	
2008	Larne Grammar School	13-12	Downshire School	
2007	Lisneal College	22-17	Downshire School	
2006	Craigavon Senior High School	13-8	Friends School Lisburn	
2005	Portora Royal School	13-8	Belfast High School	
