= Ulster Schools' Cup =

Annual Irish rugby union competition

- Most recent season or competition: 2026
- Sport: Rugby Union
- Founded: 1876
- First season: 1876
- Claim to fame: Third-oldest rugby competition.
- No. of teams: 33 (season 2017–18)
- Region: Ulster
- Venue: Ravenhill Stadium (final)
- Most recent champions: Campbell College (25 titles outright) (2026)
- Most titles: Methodist College Belfast (37 titles outright, 2 shared)
- Broadcaster: BBC (final)
- Related competitions: Medallion Shield
- Website: Ulster Rugby; Danske Bank Schools Cup

Notes
- Also includes subsidiary competitions - Schools' Shield, Schools' Bowl and Schools' Trophy

The Ulster Schools' Challenge Cup is an annual competition involving schools affiliated to the Ulster Branch of the Irish Rugby Football Union. The Schools' Cup has the distinction of being the world's second-oldest rugby competition, having been competed for every year since 1876. The trophy itself is a three-handled silver cup with a plinth mounted on a large shield.

Methodist College Belfast have won the most titles with 37 outright wins.

== Format ==
The Schools' Cup was reformatted in 2003/04. Previously teams defeated in the first round would enter the Subsidiary Shield competition, teams losing in later rounds would find their season over. All entrants, except those who drew byes, entered in the first round of the competition. It was felt that this could lead to significant mismatches. The reformatting sought to avoid this and to extend the amount of meaningful rugby played by school teams.

The first round was changed to act as a qualifying stage for weaker teams and first round losers entered a new Schools' Trophy competition.

The bulk of the teams entered the competition in the second round where they were joined by the first-round qualifiers. Teams losing at this stage are entered into another new competition, the Schools' Bowl.

In the third round, four seeded teams entered the fray. Third-round losers entered the Subsidiary Shield, renamed the Schools' Shield. The Subsidiary Shield was first introduced in 1971. It did not have its own trophy until 1980 when the Headmaster of Grosvenor High School and then Ulster Branch President Ken Reid presented the Grosvenor Shield.

The remaining teams contest for the Schools' Cup proper, the semi-finals and final of which are played at Ravenhill Stadium, the Ulster Branch HQ and home of the Ulster side.

The competition format was changed again in 2005/06. The first round was a round-robin competition involving three teams. The winner from this joined eleven other teams in the second round. The six winners from the second round joined ten more teams in the third round; the second round losers competed for the Schools' Trophy.

The eight third-round winners proceeded to the fourth round where they were joined by eight seeded teams. The third-round losers competed for the Schools' Bowl. The fourth round proceeded as per the old third round.

The increased number of competitions means that schools which are very unlikely to win the main competition have more competitive rugby and an opportunity to win a trophy.

== History ==
The first winners in 1876 were the Royal School, Armagh. When the Cup no longer had room to record the winners on it, the Cup was mounted on a wooden shield to which plaques were attached. In the centenary year of the competition after the 1976 final, the governors of Methodist College presented a new shield, as the original had no more room to record the winners. The Royal School won in 1977, thus claiming the place at the top of the new shield. The first wooden shield is on exhibit at the Ulster Branch offices at Ravenhill Stadium.

The first final to be played at Ravenhill was in 1924. Before that, finals were played at the Royal Ulster Agricultural Society grounds at Balmoral, the Ulster Sports Club grounds at Cross Parade in Belfast, and one final was played at the Linfield Football Club ground at Windsor Park.

A total of eighteen schools have won the trophy at least once.

The St. Patrick's Day final is televised live on BBC Northern Ireland.

== List of finals ==
Note: Prior to 1942 drawn finals were always replayed. In 1942 it was decided if the final was drawn, a replay would only take place if both schools agreed. It has since become the rule that replays are never held and the trophy is automatically shared. Shares occurred in 1942, 1953, 1954, 1960, 1962, 1963, 1964 & 1996.

Key

(R)	Replay
*	Trophy shared
†	After extra time

Ulster Schools' Cup Winners
Year	Winners	Score	Runners-up	Venue
1876	The Royal School, Armagh	3-0	Royal Belfast Academical Institution	RUAS Grounds
1877	The Royal School, Armagh	15-0	Methodist College Belfast	RUAS Grounds
1878	Methodist College Belfast	8-0	Royal School Dungannon	RUAS Grounds
1879	The Royal School, Armagh	6-0	Methodist College Belfast	RUAS Grounds
1880	The Royal School, Armagh	3-0	Methodist College Belfast	RUAS Grounds
1881	The Royal School, Armagh	6-0	Royal Belfast Academical Institution	RUAS Grounds
1882	Methodist College Belfast	3-0	Londonderry Academical Institution	RUAS Grounds
1883	The Royal School, Armagh	8-0	Royal Belfast Academical Institution	RUAS Grounds
1884	Coleraine Academical Institution	3-0	Foyle College	RUAS Grounds
1885	The Royal School, Armagh	5-0	Methodist College Belfast	RUAS Grounds
1886	Coleraine Academical Institution	5-0 †	Royal Belfast Academical Institution	RUAS Grounds
1887	Coleraine Academical Institution	11-0	Galway Grammar School	RUAS Grounds
1888	Royal Belfast Academical Institution	3-0	Coleraine Academical Institution	RUAS Grounds
1889	Methodist College Belfast	3-0	Coleraine Academical Institution	RUAS Grounds
1890	Royal Belfast Academical Institution	16-0	Coleraine Academical Institution	RUAS Grounds
1891	Methodist College Belfast	3-0	Coleraine Academical Institution	RUAS Grounds
1892	Methodist College Belfast	8-0	Coleraine Academical Institution	RUAS Grounds
1893	Methodist College Belfast	3-0	Coleraine Academical Institution	RUAS Grounds
1894	Coleraine Academical Institution	3-0	Methodist College Belfast	RUAS Grounds
1895	Royal Belfast Academical Institution	6-5	Coleraine Academical Institution	RUAS Grounds
1896	Methodist College Belfast	5-3	Londonderry Academical Institution	RUAS Grounds
1897	Coleraine Academical Institution	6-0	Methodist College Belfast	RUAS Grounds
1898	Campbell College	7-0	Coleraine Academical Institution	RUAS Grounds
1899	Methodist College Belfast	21-0	Portora Royal School	RUAS Grounds
1900	Foyle College	3-3 †	Methodist College Belfast	RUAS Grounds
1900 (R)	Foyle College	6-0 †	Methodist College Belfast	RUAS Grounds
1901	Methodist College Belfast	6-3	Coleraine Academical Institution	Ulster Sports Ground
1902	Methodist College Belfast	38-0	Portora Royal School	RUAS Grounds
1903	Royal Belfast Academical Institution	28-0	The Royal School, Armagh	RUAS Grounds
1904	Methodist College Belfast	11-0	Portora Royal School	RUAS Grounds
1905	Portora Royal School	16-5	Methodist College Belfast	RUAS Grounds
1906	Portora Royal School	8-5	Foyle College	RUAS Grounds
1907	Royal School Dungannon	5-0	Royal Belfast Academical Institution	RUAS Grounds
1908	Portora Royal School	52-0	Coleraine Academical Institution	RUAS Grounds
1909	Portora Royal School	42-0	Coleraine Academical Institution	RUAS Grounds
1910	Campbell College	7-0	Coleraine Academical Institution	RUAS Grounds
1911	Competition not finished			
1912	Royal Belfast Academical Institution	11-3	Methodist College Belfast	RUAS Grounds
1913	Campbell College	10-3	Foyle College	RUAS Grounds
1914	Methodist College Belfast	13-0	Foyle College	RUAS Grounds
1915	Foyle College	5-3	The Royal School, Armagh	RUAS Grounds
1916	Royal Belfast Academical Institution	3-0	Campbell College	RUAS Grounds
1917	Campbell College	9-3	Royal Belfast Academical Institution	RUAS Grounds
1918	Royal Belfast Academical Institution	24-5	Royal School Dungannon	RUAS Grounds
1919	Royal Belfast Academical Institution	8-0	Campbell College	RUAS Grounds
1920	Coleraine Academical Institution	3-0	Campbell College	RUAS Grounds
1921	Campbell College	8-0	Coleraine Academical Institution	RUAS Grounds
1922	Campbell College	10-0	Royal Belfast Academical Institution	Windsor Park
1923	Campbell College	23-0	Portora Royal School	RUAS Grounds
1924	Campbell College	16-3	Ballymena Academy	Ravenhill Stadium
1925	Coleraine Academical Institution	13-3	Methodist College Belfast	Ravenhill Stadium
1926	Campbell College	14-14 †	Coleraine Academical Institution	Ravenhill Stadium
1926 (R)	Campbell College	11-3	Coleraine Academical Institution	Ravenhill Stadium
1927	Methodist College Belfast	22-9	The Royal School, Armagh	Ravenhill Stadium
1928	Methodist College Belfast	24-3	Ballymena Academy	Ravenhill Stadium
1929	Methodist College Belfast	18-5	Portora Royal School	Ravenhill Stadium
1930	Royal Belfast Academical Institution	14-5	Methodist College Belfast	Ravenhill Stadium
1931	Campbell College	12-5	Methodist College Belfast	Ravenhill Stadium
1932	Campbell College	11-0	Royal Belfast Academical Institution	Ravenhill Stadium
1933	Royal Belfast Academical Institution	8-0	Methodist College Belfast	Ravenhill Stadium
1934	Royal Belfast Academical Institution	18-0	Lurgan College	Ravenhill Stadium
1935	Royal Belfast Academical Institution	6-6 †	Methodist College Belfast	Ravenhill Stadium
1935 (R)	Royal Belfast Academical Institution	14-0	Methodist College Belfast	Ravenhill Stadium
1936	Methodist College Belfast	12-3	Coleraine Academical Institution	Ravenhill Stadium
1937	Methodist College Belfast	5-3	Belfast Royal Academy	Ravenhill Stadium
1938	Royal Belfast Academical Institution	7-6	Coleraine Academical Institution	Ravenhill Stadium
1939	Coleraine Academical Institution	16-5	Methodist College Belfast	Ravenhill Stadium
1940	Portora Royal School	6-3 †	Coleraine Academical Institution	Ravenhill Stadium
1941	Portora Royal School	11-3	Coleraine Academical Institution	Ravenhill Stadium
1942	Portora Royal School	5-5*	Royal Belfast Academical Institution	Ravenhill Stadium
1943	Royal Belfast Academical Institution	8-0	Coleraine Academical Institution	Ravenhill Stadium
1944	Royal Belfast Academical Institution	10-0	Coleraine Academical Institution	Ravenhill Stadium
1945	Royal Belfast Academical Institution	5-0	Methodist College Belfast	Ravenhill Stadium
1946	Royal Belfast Academical Institution	8-3	Methodist College Belfast	Ravenhill Stadium
1947	Royal Belfast Academical Institution	7-3	Methodist College Belfast	Ravenhill Stadium
1948	Royal Belfast Academical Institution	0-0 †	Campbell College	Ravenhill Stadium
1948 (R)	Royal Belfast Academical Institution	11-3	Campbell College	Ravenhill Stadium
1949	Methodist College Belfast	12-3	Royal Belfast Academical Institution	Ravenhill Stadium
1950	Campbell College	5-0	Royal Belfast Academical Institution	Ravenhill Stadium
1951	Royal Belfast Academical Institution	6-0	Campbell College	Ravenhill Stadium
1952	Methodist College Belfast	15-0	Campbell College	Ravenhill Stadium
1953	Campbell College	0-0*	Methodist College Belfast	Ravenhill Stadium
1954	Campbell College	10-10*	Royal Belfast Academical Institution	Ravenhill Stadium
1955	Campbell College	6-5	Methodist College Belfast	Ravenhill Stadium
1956	Campbell College	6-3	Methodist College Belfast	Ravenhill Stadium
1957	Royal Belfast Academical Institution	5-3	Methodist College Belfast	Ravenhill Stadium
1958	Annadale Grammar School	5-0	Campbell College	Ravenhill Stadium
1959	Royal Belfast Academical Institution	8-0	Royal School Dungannon	Ravenhill Stadium
1960	Campbell College	0-0*	Royal Belfast Academical Institution	Ravenhill Stadium
1961	Campbell College	16-6	Royal Belfast Academical Institution	Ravenhill Stadium
1962	Belfast Royal Academy	6-6*	Royal Belfast Academical Institution	Ravenhill Stadium
1963	Belfast Royal Academy	8-8*	Rainey Endowed School	Ravenhill Stadium
1964	Belfast Royal Academy	0-0*	Campbell College	Ravenhill Stadium
1965	Campbell College	14-0	Rainey Endowed School	Ravenhill Stadium
1966	Campbell College	3-0	Coleraine Academical Institution	Ravenhill Stadium
1967	Rainey Endowed School	9-6	Methodist College Belfast	Ravenhill Stadium
1968	Campbell College	13-0	Belfast Royal Academy	Ravenhill Stadium
1969	Bangor Grammar School	6-3	Campbell College	Ravenhill Stadium
1970	Royal Belfast Academical Institution	11-3	Rainey Endowed School	Ravenhill Stadium
1971	Belfast Boys' Model School	14-3	Ballymena Academy	Ravenhill Stadium
1972	Ballymena Academy	13-9	Belfast Royal Academy	Ravenhill Stadium
1973	Ballyclare High School	13-8	Royal Belfast Academical Institution	Ravenhill Stadium
1974	Methodist College Belfast	7-6	Royal Belfast Academical Institution	Ravenhill Stadium
1975	Methodist College Belfast	18-7	Royal School Dungannon	Ravenhill Stadium
1976	Methodist College Belfast	21-3	Campbell College	Ravenhill Stadium
1977	The Royal School, Armagh	12-9	Regent House Grammar School	Ravenhill Stadium
1978	Bangor Grammar School	17-9	Annadale Grammar School	Ravenhill Stadium
1979	Methodist College Belfast	10-7	Bangor Grammar School	Ravenhill Stadium
1980	Campbell College	3-0	Royal Belfast Academical Institution	Ravenhill Stadium
1981	Ballymena Academy	12-3	Bangor Grammar School	Ravenhill Stadium
1982	Rainey Endowed School	6-4	Ballymena Academy	Ravenhill Stadium
1983	Grosvenor Grammar School	10-7	Royal Belfast Academical Institution	Ravenhill Stadium
1984	Methodist College Belfast	13-9	Belfast Royal Academy	Ravenhill Stadium
1985	Bangor Grammar School	12-3	Omagh Academy	Ravenhill Stadium
1986	Bangor Grammar School	17-4	Royal Belfast Academical Institution	Ravenhill Stadium
1987	Methodist College Belfast	10-9	Bangor Grammar School	Ravenhill Stadium
1988	Bangor Grammar School	13-4	Coleraine Academical Institution	Ravenhill Stadium
1989	Methodist College Belfast	26-12	Wallace High School	Ravenhill Stadium
1990	Methodist College Belfast	15-0	Campbell College	Ravenhill Stadium
1991	Methodist College Belfast	23-7	Coleraine Academical Institution	Ravenhill Stadium
1992	Coleraine Academical Institution	35-21	Methodist College Belfast	Ravenhill Stadium
1993	Campbell College	46-13	Dalriada School	Ravenhill Stadium
1994	Regent House Grammar School	8-3	Wallace High School	Ravenhill Stadium
1995	Royal Belfast Academical Institution	18-9	Bangor Grammar School	Ravenhill Stadium
1996	Methodist College Belfast	9-9 *	Regent House Grammar School	Ravenhill Stadium
1997	Belfast Royal Academy	12-0	Royal Belfast Academical Institution	Ravenhill Stadium
1998	Royal Belfast Academical Institution	57-3	Coleraine Academical Institution	Ravenhill Stadium
1999	Campbell College	18-7	Ballymena Academy	Ravenhill Stadium
2000	Royal Belfast Academical Institution	24-6	Ballymena Academy	Ravenhill Stadium
2001	Methodist College Belfast	8-6	Royal Belfast Academical Institution	Ravenhill Stadium
2002	Campbell College	12-10	Methodist College Belfast	Ravenhill Stadium
2003	Royal Belfast Academical Institution	23-10	Wallace High School	Ravenhill Stadium
2004	The Royal School, Armagh	14-5	Campbell College	Ravenhill Stadium
2005	Royal Belfast Academical Institution	12-10	Methodist College Belfast	Ravenhill Stadium
2006	Methodist College Belfast	11-5	Campbell College	Ravenhill Stadium
2007	Royal Belfast Academical Institution	15-0	Wallace High School	Ravenhill Stadium
2008	Methodist College Belfast	36-0	Regent House Grammar School	Ravenhill Stadium
2009	Methodist College Belfast	16-0	Royal Belfast Academical Institution	Ravenhill Stadium
2010	Ballymena Academy	10-7	Belfast Royal Academy	Ravenhill Stadium
2011	Campbell College	18-11	Royal Belfast Academical Institution	Ravenhill Stadium
2012	Methodist College Belfast	22-6	Ballyclare High School	Ravenhill Stadium
2013	Methodist College Belfast	20-5	Royal Belfast Academical Institution	Ravenhill Stadium
2014	Methodist College Belfast	27-12	Sullivan Upper School	Ravenhill Stadium
2015	Royal Belfast Academical Institution	14-10	Wallace High School	Ravenhill Stadium
2016	Royal Belfast Academical Institution	13-3	Campbell College	Ravenhill Stadium
2017	Royal Belfast Academical Institution	12-8	Methodist College Belfast	Ravenhill Stadium
2018	Campbell College	19-13	The Royal School, Armagh	Ravenhill Stadium
2019	Methodist College Belfast	45-17	Campbell College	Ravenhill Stadium
2020	The Royal School, Armagh	Not played*	Wallace High School	—N/a
2021	Competition cancelled due to the COVID-19 pandemic			
2022	Methodist College Belfast	20-17	Campbell College	Ravenhill Stadium
2023	Royal Belfast Academical Institution	22-17	Campbell College	Ravenhill Stadium
2024	Royal Belfast Academical Institution	21-14	Ballymena Academy	Ravenhill Stadium
2025	Wallace High School	24-15	The Royal School, Armagh	Ravenhill Stadium
2026	Campbell College	26-22	Royal Belfast Academical Institution	Ravenhill Stadium

=== Points values ===
The values for scores in rugby union have changed throughout the history of the competition. This table summarises them.

Change in scoring
Date	Try	Conversion	Penalty	Dropped goal	Goal from mark
1876–1885	1 try	1 goal	1 goal	1 goal	—N/a
1876–1885	Match decided by a majority of goals, or if the number of goals is equal by a majority of tries				
1886–1891	1 point	2 points	3 points	3 points	—N/a
1891–1894	2 points	3 points	3 points	4 points	4 points
1894–1904	3 points	2 points	3 points	4 points	4 points
1905–1947	3 points	2 points	3 points	4 points	3 points
1948–1970	3 points	2 points	3 points	3 points	3 points
1971–1977	4 points	2 points	3 points	3 points	3 points
1977–1991	4 points	2 points	3 points	3 points	—N/a
1992–present	5 points	2 points	3 points	3 points	—N/a

=== Records ===
- Most consecutive wins: 7, Royal Belfast Academical Institution 1942-48
- Greatest winning margin in final: 54 points, 1998: Royal Belfast Academical Institution 57-3 Coleraine Academical Institution
- Highest aggregate score in final: 62 points, 2019: Methodist College Belfast 45-17 Campbell College

== Results by school ==
Information as provided by Schools' Cup Final programme (various years)

Results by school
School	Location	Wins (incl. Shared)	Wins	First final won	Last final won	Runners-Up	Last final lost	Total final appearances
Methodist College Belfast	Belfast	39	37	1878	2022	26	2017	65
Royal Belfast Academical Institution	Belfast	38	34	1888	2024	21	2026	60
Campbell College	Belfast	29	25	1898	2026	16	2023	43
Coleraine Academical Institution	Coleraine	9	9	1884	1992	24	1998	33
The Royal School, Armagh	Armagh	9	9	1876	2004	4	2025	14
Portora Royal School	Enniskillen	7	6	1905	1941	5	1929	11
Bangor Grammar School	Bangor	5	5	1969	1988	4	1995	9
Ballymena Academy	Ballymena	3	3	1972	2010	6	2024	10
Foyle College	Derry	2	2	1900	1915	4	1914	6
Rainey Endowed School	Magherafelt	3	2	1967	1982	2	1970	5
Belfast Royal Academy	Belfast	4	1	1997	1997	5	2010	9
Wallace High School	Lisburn	2	1	2025	2025	5	2015	7
Royal School Dungannon	Dungannon	1	1	1907	1907	4	1975	5
Regent House Grammar School	Newtownards	2	1	1994	1994	2	2008	4
Annadale Grammar School	Belfast	1	1	1958	1958	1	1978	2
Ballyclare High School	Ballyclare	1	1	1973	1973	1	2012	2
Grosvenor Grammar School	Belfast	1	1	1983	1983	0	—	1
Belfast Boys' Model School	Belfast	1	1	1971	1971	0	—	1
Londonderry Academical Institution	Derry	0	0	—	—	2	1896	2
Dalriada School	Ballymoney	0	0	—	—	1	1993	1
Galway Grammar School	Galway	0	0	—	—	1	1887	1
Lurgan College	Lurgan	0	0	—	—	1	1934	1
Omagh Academy	Omagh	0	0	—	—	1	1985	1
Sullivan Upper School	Holywood	0	0	—	—	1	2014	1

== Subsidiary competitions ==
=== Schools' Shield ===
*	Trophy shared

Year	Winners	Score	Runners-up
1971	Royal Belfast Academical Institution	9–8	Down High School
1972	Grosvenor Grammar School	16–9	Royal School Dungannon
1973	Portadown College	7–0	Belfast Boys' Model School
1974	Down High School	9–4	Portadown College
1975	Dalriada School	4–3	Carrickfergus Grammar School
1976	Ballymena Academy	9–6	Belfast Royal Academy
1977	Campbell College	4–3	Belfast Royal Academy
1978	Coleraine Academical Institution	20–0	Belfast High School
1979	Ballymena Academy	10–0	Carrickfergus Grammar School
1980	Sullivan Upper School	3–0	Down High School
1981	Belfast High School	10–6	Larne Grammar School
1982	Friends School Lisburn	12–9	Down High School
1983	Belfast Royal Academy	11–6	Wallace High School
1984	Bangor Grammar School	9–9 *	Belfast High School
1985	Cambridge House Grammar School	10–3	Coleraine Academical Institution
1986	Omagh Academy	3–3 *	Wallace High School
1987	Belfast Royal Academy	8–6	Portadown College
1988	Royal Belfast Academical Institution	9–7	Ballyclare High School
1989	Bangor Grammar School	9–3	Coleraine Academical Institution
1990	Portadown College	7–0	Rainey Endowed School
1991	Royal School Dungannon	10–6	Larne Grammar School
1992	Ballymena Academy	15–0	Larne Grammar School
1993	Coleraine Academical Institution	31–16	Ballymena Academy
1994	Omagh Academy	13–0	Campbell College
1995	Coleraine Academical Institution	16–11	Ballymena Academy
1996	Royal Belfast Academical Institution	31–15	Portadown College
1997	Portadown College	16–9	Ballymena Academy
1998	Rainey Endowed School	8–6	The Royal School, Armagh
1999	The Royal School, Armagh	26–3	Bangor Grammar School
2000	Royal School Dungannon	22–19	Portadown College
2001	Coleraine Academical Institution	28–7	Royal School Dungannon
2002	Coleraine Academical Institution	23–12	Ballyclare High School
2003	Coleraine Academical Institution	17–17 *	Campbell College
2004	Methodist College Belfast	19–13	Wallace High School, Lisburn
2005	Belfast Royal Academy	16–12	Ballyclare High School
2006	Ballymena Academy	17–11	Regent House, Newtownards
2007	Ballymena Academy	32–12	Portadown College
2008	Royal Belfast Academical Institution	27–12	Coleraine Academical Institution
2009	Ballymena Academy	36–19	Coleraine Academical Institution
2010	The Royal School, Armagh	22–10	Campbell College
2011	Ballymena Academy	33–5	Bangor Grammar School
2012	The Royal School, Armagh	24–3	Limavady Grammar School
2013	Campbell College	19–5	Belfast Royal Academy
2014	Dalriada School	12–3	Ballymena Academy
2015	Ballymena Academy	20–10	Down High School
2016	Wallace High School	21–5	Down High School
2017	Down High School	19–13	Ballyclare High School
2018	Ballyclare High School	34–28	Down High School
2019	Sullivan Upper School	27–5	Bangor Grammar School
2020	Bangor Grammar School	Awarded to BGS *	Campbell College
2021	Competition cancelled due to the COVID-19 pandemic		
2022	Royal School Armagh	19-10	Royal School Dungannon
2023	Royal School Armagh	43-19	Down High School
2024	Campbell College	45-14	Royal School Armagh
2025	Campbell College	45-31	Methodist College Belfast
2026	Belfast Royal Academy	43-30	Coleraine Grammar School

=== Schools' Bowl ===
*	Trophy shared

Year	Winners	Score	Runners-up
2004	Regent House Grammar School	22–0	Dalriada School
2005	Rainey Endowed School	24–5	Carrickfergus Grammar School
2006	Foyle and Londonderry College	22–19	Limavady Grammar School
2007	Royal School Dungannon	11–11 *	Sullivan Upper School
2008	Foyle College	39–24	Cambridge House Grammar School
2009	The Royal School, Armagh	17–7	Grosvenor Grammar School
2010	Foyle College	28–7	Grosvenor Grammar School
2011	Rainey Endowed School	14–11	Friends School Lisburn
2012	Sullivan Upper School	24–12	Belfast Royal Academy
2013	Omagh Academy	24–0	Rainey Endowed School
2014	Foyle College	11–5	Banbridge Academy
2015	Dalriada School	31–15	Rainey Endowed School
2016	Portora Royal School	20–7	Grosvenor Grammar School
2017	Bangor Grammar School	41-3	Regent House Grammar School
2018	Belfast Royal Academy	26-14	Portadown College
2019	Coleraine Grammar School	26-16	Friends School Lisburn
2020	Dromore High School	33-17	Banbridge Academy
2021	Competition cancelled due to the COVID-19 pandemic		
2022	Rainey Endowed School	42-16	Belfast High School
2023	Banbridge Academy	31 - 15	Friends School Lisburn
2024	Ballyclare High School	10 - 7	Cambridge House Grammar School
2025	Ballyclare High School	38 - 3	Limavady Grammar School
2026	Bangor Grammar School	20 - 3	Enniskillen Royal Grammar School

=== Schools' Trophy ===
Year	Winners	Score	Runners-up
2004	Lurgan College	18–8	Cambridge House Grammar School
2005	Strabane Grammar School	24–13	Lurgan College
2006	Down High School	48–5	Lurgan College
2007	Larne Grammar School	11–3	Omagh Academy
2008	Larne Grammar School	12–0	Dalriada School
2009	Carrickfergus Grammar School	34–26	Down High School
2010	Portadown College	14–15 (*)	Cambridge House Grammar School
2011	Portora Royal School	22–5	Omagh Academy
2012	Omagh Academy	9–5	Larne Grammar School
2013	Banbridge Academy	32–0	Portora Royal School
2014	Royal School Dungannon	17–15	Wellington College Belfast
2015	Royal School Dungannon	29–10	Lurgan College
2016	Banbridge Academy	15–0	Belfast High School
2017	Foyle College	15-11	Banbridge Academy
2018	Banbridge Academy	25-16	Belfast High School
2019	Dromore High School	14-10	Limavady Grammar School
2020	Royal School Dungannon	39-14	Larne Grammar School
2021	Competition cancelled due to the COVID-19 pandemic		
2022	Lurgan College	21-12	Portadown College
2023	Portadown College	32-14	Cambridge House Grammar School
2024	Dalriada School	40-5	Antrim Grammar School
2025	Antrim Grammar School	22-19	Larne Grammar School
2026	Omagh Academy	17-12	Foyle and Londonderry College

(*) - Cambridge House fielded an ineligible player in the final: the Trophy was awarded to Portadown College.

== See also ==
- Ulster Rugby
- Medallion Shield
- Connacht Schools Senior Cup
- Leinster Schools Senior Cup
- Munster Schools Senior Cup
- Ireland national schoolboy rugby union team
- List of oldest rugby union competitions
