= Ulster Schoolgirls' Senior Cup (field hockey) =

Irish school hockey competition

Ulster Senior Schoolgirls' Cup
- Sport: Field hockey
- Founded: 1907
- No. of teams: 36
- Most recent champion: The Royal School, Armagh
- Most titles: Methodist College Belfast; 18 outright and 3 shared
- Website: Belfast Telegraph Senior Schools Cup

Notes
- Winners qualify for the Kate Russell All-Ireland Cup Finals

The Ulster Senior Schoolgirls' Cup is an annual competition competed for by schools affiliated to the Ulster Hockey Association, a branch of the Irish Hockey Association. The competition has been in existence since 1907 and is currently sponsored by the Belfast Telegraph.

Since 1980, the winners have qualified to represent Ulster in the Kate Russell All-Ireland Schools Hockey Cup.

The most successful school is Methodist College Belfast with 21 wins (18 outright wins and 3 shared wins). The current holder is The Royal School, Armagh.

== Trophy ==
The trophy is a small silver cup mounted on a plinth on a wooden shield.

== Format ==
The competition is run through an open draw format. The first round is held in November, progressing through to a showpiece final held in early March. The final attracts a crowd of roughly 1000 people, which is large for an attendance at a hockey match in Ulster.

== Performance table ==
School	Outright Titles	Shared Titles	Runners-Up	Total Finals	Last Title
Methodist College Belfast	20	3	12	35	2022
Victoria College, Belfast	14	2	8	24	1973
Belfast Royal Academy	12	3	8	23	2020
The Royal School, Armagh	9	0	3	12	2026
St Dominic's High School	7	6	7	20	1981
Ballymena Academy	6	3	9	18	2001
Lurgan College	5	0	7	12	2014
Strathearn School	5	2	5	12	1992
Regent House, Newtownards	4	1	2	7	1998
Portadown College	4	0	2	6	2025
Friends School Lisburn	3	1	6	10	1999
Londonderry High School	2	0	3	5	1954
Foyle and Londonderry College	2	0	2	4	2009
Princess Gardens, Finaghy	2	0	1	3	1971
Banbridge Academy	2	0	2	4	2018-19
Sullivan Upper School	1	1	2	4	2015
Dalriada School	1	0	5	6	1993
Omagh Academy	1	0	3	4	2005
Rainey Endowed School, Magherafelt	1	0	2	3	2018
Ballyclare High School	1	0	2	3	2012
Enniskillen Collegiate	1	0	1	2	1997
Larne Grammar School	1	0	0	1	2000
Royal School Dungannon	1	0	0	1	1995
Down High School	1	0	0	1	1939
Glenlola Collegiate School	0	1	0	1	1980
Wallace High School	0	0	2	2	NA
Ashleigh House School, Belfast	0	0	1	1	NA
Belmont Ladies' College	0	0	1	1	NA
Bloomfield Collegiate	0	0	1	1	NA
Coleraine High School	0	0	1	1	NA
Knock Ladies Collegiate	0	0	1	1	NA
Limavady Grammar School	0	0	1	1	NA
Oriel Collegiate School, Larne	0	0	1	1	NA

== Finals ==
=== 1900s ===
Year	Winner			Runner-up	Notes
1907	Victoria College, Belfast	2	1	Knock Ladies Collegiate	
1908	Methodist College	1	0	Belmont Ladies' College	
1909	Methodist College				

=== 1910s ===
Year	Winner			Runner-up	Notes
1910	Victoria College, Belfast	3	1	Methodist College	Replay - Game 1: 0-0
1911	Victoria College, Belfast	3	0	Oriel Collegiate School, Larne	
1912	Methodist College	2	0	Victoria College, Belfast	
1913	Methodist College	2	1	Victoria College, Belfast	
1914	Methodist College	2	0	Victoria College, Belfast	
1915	Victoria College, Belfast	2	0	Methodist College	Replay
1916	Methodist College	3	1	Victoria College, Belfast	
1917	Methodist College	5	0	Ashleigh House School, Belfast	
1918	Methodist College	1	0	Belfast Royal Academy	2nd replay - Game 1: 0-0; Game 2: 1-1
1919	Methodist College	2	0	Belfast Royal Academy	replay - Game 1: 0-0

=== 1920s ===
Year	Winner			Runner-up	Notes
1920	Methodist College	2	0	Belfast Royal Academy	
1921	Belfast Royal Academy	2	1	Methodist College	
1922	Methodist College	2	1	Belfast Royal Academy	
1923	Methodist College	2	0	Ballymena Academy	
1924	Victoria College, Belfast	4	3	Methodist College	Replay - Game 1: 2-2
1925	Victoria College, Belfast	1	0	Methodist College	
1926	Victoria College, Belfast	3	0	Methodist College	
1927	Victoria College, Belfast	2	1	St. Dominic's High School	After extra time in replay - Game 1:1-1
1928	Victoria College, Belfast	3	0	Friends School Lisburn	
1929	Belfast Royal Academy	1	0	St. Dominic's High School	

=== 1930s ===
Year	Winner			Runner-up	Notes
1930	Methodist College	2	0	St. Dominic's High School	
1931	Methodist College	3	1	Belfast Royal Academy	
1932	Methodist College & St. Dominic's High School	0	0	TROPHY SHARED	2nd replay, Game 1: 0-0; Game 2: 1-1
1933	Methodist College	3	0	Lurgan College	
1934	Belfast Royal Academy	1	0	Methodist College	
1935	St. Dominic's High School	2	0	Methodist College	
1936	Methodist College	4	0	Lurgan College	
1937	St. Dominic's High School	3	0	Methodist College	
1938	Methodist College	2	1	Londonderry High School	
1939	Down High School	1	0	Victoria College, Belfast	

=== 1940s ===
Year	Winner			Runner-up	Notes
1940					
1941	Belfast Royal Academy	8	0	Regent House, Newtownards	
1942	Victoria College, Belfast	3	1	Belfast Royal Academy	
1943	Belfast Royal Academy	3	0	Londonderry High School	
1944	Belfast Royal Academy	1	0	Lurgan College	
1945	Belfast Royal Academy	3	0	Victoria College, Belfast	
1946	Victoria College, Belfast	1	0	St. Dominic's High School	
1947	St. Dominic's High School & Victoria College, Belfast	1	1	TROPHY SHARED	three attempts at a replay were postponed by bad weather
1948	Victoria College, Belfast	4	2	Dalriada School	after extra time
1949	Methodist College & St. Dominic's High School	2	2	TROPHY SHARED	replay - Game 1: 1-1

=== 1950s ===
Year	Winner			Runner-up	Notes
1950	St. Dominic's High School	3	0	Belfast Royal Academy	
1951	Victoria College, Belfast	2	1	St. Dominic's High School	Replay - Game 1:
1952	Belfast Royal Academy	3	2	Londonderry High School	
1953	Londonderry High School	3	2	St. Dominic's High School	
1954	Londonderry High School	2	1	Ballymena Academy	
1955	Lurgan College	2	0	Ballymena Academy	
1956	St. Dominic's High School	3	2	Dalriada School	
1957	Belfast Royal Academy	2	1	Lurgan College	
1958	Belfast Royal Academy	2	1	Friends School Lisburn	
1959	St. Dominic's High School	1	0	Friends School Lisburn	Replay

=== 1960s ===
Year	Winner			Runner-up	Notes
1960	St. Dominic's High School & Belfast Royal Academy	0	0	TROPHY SHARED	
1961	St. Dominic's High School & Belfast Royal Academy	1	1	TROPHY SHARED	
1962	St. Dominic's High School & Strathearn School, Belfast	0	0	TROPHY SHARED	
1963	Portadown College	3	1	Strathearn School, Belfast	
1964	Portadown College	3	0	Friends School Lisburn	
1965					
1966	Friends School Lisburn	3	1	Methodist College	
1967	Strathearn School, Belfast			Bloomfield Collegiate	
1968	Strathearn School, Belfast & Belfast Royal Academy	0	0	TROPHY SHARED	
1969	Princess Gardens, Finaghy	1	0	Belfast Royal Academy	

=== 1970s ===
Year	Winner			Runner-up	Notes
1970	Strathearn School, Belfast	5	1	Portadown College	
1971	Princess Gardens, Finaghy	3	0	Strathearn School	
1972	Victoria College, Belfast	3	2	Strathearn School	
1973	Ballymena Academy & Victoria College, Belfast	0	0	TROPHY SHARED	
1974	Belfast Royal Academy	1	0	Ballymena Academy	
1975	St. Dominic's High School	2	0	Victoria College, Belfast	
1976	Ballymena Academy & Methodist College	0	0	TROPHY SHARED	
1977	Regent House, Newtownards	1	0	Rainey Endowed School	
1978	Ballymena Academy	1	0	Coleraine High School	
1979	Friends School Lisburn & Regent House, Newtownards	1	1	TROPHY SHARED	

=== 1980s ===
Year	Winner			Runner-up	Notes
1980	Glenlola Collegiate, Bangor & Sullivan Upper School	0	0	TROPHY SHARED	Glenlola proceeded to the All-Ireland competition after a playoff that was drawn and a penalty stroke tiebreaker that took 20 attempts each to separate the teams.
1981	St. Dominic's High School	2	1	Strathearn School, Belfast	
1982	Foyle & Londonderry College	2	0	St. Dominic's High School	
1983	Strathearn School	4	0	Limavady Grammar School	
1984	Strathearn School	2	0	Dalriada School	
1985	Regent House, Newtownards	2	0	Ballymena Academy	
1986	Friends School Lisburn	3	1	Ballymena Academy	
1987	Regent House, Newtownards	2	0	Princess Gardens, Finaghy	
1988	Methodist College	2	0	Friends School Lisburn	
1989	Ballymena Academy	1	0	Strathearn School	

=== 1990s ===
Year	Winner			Runner-up	Notes
1990	Ballymena Academy	3	0	Portadown College	
1991	Ballymena Academy	1	1	Methodist College	Ballymena Academy won 2–1 on pens
1992	Strathearn School, Belfast	1	0	Dalriada School	
1993	Dalriada School	0	0	Methodist College	Dalriada School won 4–2 on pens
1994	Ballymena Academy	0	0	Regent House	Ballymena Academy won 1–0 on pens
1995	Royal School Dungannon	0	0	Ballymena Academy	Royal School Dungannon won 3–1 on pens
1996	Portadown College	1	0	Foyle & Londonderry College	
1997	Enniskillen Collegiate	2	1	Foyle & Londonderry College	
1998	Regent House, Newtownards	0	0	Enniskillen Collegiate	Regent House won 3–2 on pens
1999	Friends School Lisburn	1	0	Omagh Academy	

=== 2000s ===
Year	Winner			Runner-up	Notes
1999-2000	Larne Grammar School	2	1	Ballymena Academy	
2000-01	Ballymena Academy	2	1	Dalriada School	
2001-02	Royal School, Armagh			Lurgan College	
2002-03	Lurgan College	9	4	Ballymena Academy	
2003-04	Royal School, Armagh	3	2	Lurgan College	
2004-05	Omagh Academy	1	0	Royal School, Armagh	
2005-06	Royal School, Armagh	3	0	Omagh Academy	
2006-07	Royal School, Armagh	1	0	Ballyclare High School	
2007-08	Royal School, Armagh	3	1	Sullivan Upper School	
2008-09	Foyle and Londonderry College	1	0	Ballymena Academy	

=== 2010s ===
Year	Winner			Runner-up	Notes
2009-10	Royal School, Armagh	2	0	Omagh Academy	
2010-11	Lurgan College	0	0	Wallace High School	Lurgan College won 4–3 on penalties
2011-12	Ballyclare High School	2	1	Lurgan College	golden goal in extra time
2012-13	Lurgan College	1	0	Victoria College, Belfast	
2013-14	Lurgan College	1	0	Rainey Endowed School	after extra time
2014-15	Sullivan Upper	2	1	Banbridge Academy	
2015-16	Methodist College Belfast	1	0	Sullivan Upper	
2016-17	Banbridge Academy	4	0	Wallace High School	
2017-18	Rainey Endowed School	1	1	Banbridge Academy	Rainey won 3–1 on penalties
2018-19	Banbridge Academy	2	1	Ballyclare High School	

=== 2020s ===
Year	Winner			Runner-up	Notes
2019-20	Belfast Royal Academy	4	2	Friends School Lisburn	
2021-22	Methodist College Belfast	1	0	The Royal School, Armagh	
2022-23	The Royal School, Armagh	2	0	Strathearn School	
2023-24	The Royal School, Armagh	1	0	Portadown College	
2024-25	Portadown College	1	1	The Royal School, Armagh	Portadown College won 2-0 on penalties
2025-26	The Royal School, Armagh	2	0	Portadown College	
