= Ballymena Academy =

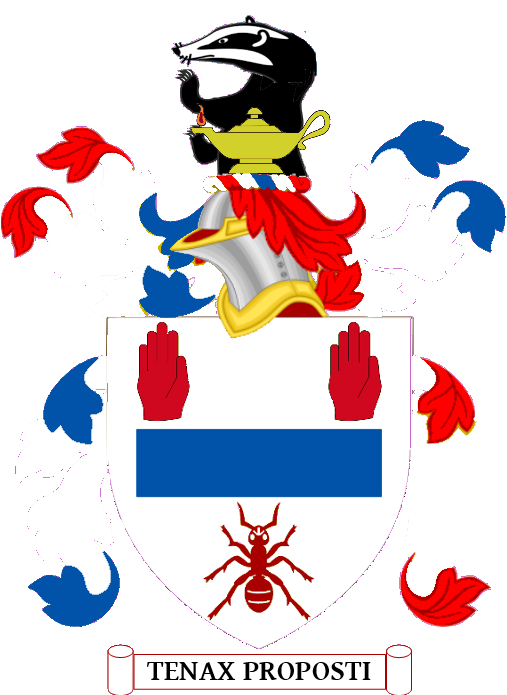

Location
- 89 Galgorm Road; Ballymena, County Antrim, BT42 1AJ; Northern Ireland; 54.864771°N 6.293615°W

Information
- Type: Grammar school
- Motto: Tenax Propositi (Steadfast in Purpose)
- Established: 1828; 198 years ago
- Local authority: Education Authority
- Chairperson: D. Johnston OBE
- Headmaster: Stephen Black
- Staff: 128
- Years offered: 8 to 14
- Gender: Mixed
- Age: 11 to 18
- Enrolment: 1500
- Campus size: 88 acres (360,000 m2)
- Houses: Knocklayde, Lurigethan, Slemish, Trostan
- Colours: Black/navy and red
- Publication: The Braid
- Website: www.ballymenaacademy.org.uk

Ballymena Academy is a co-educational voluntary grammar school in the market town of Ballymena in County Antrim, Northern Ireland. It was founded in 1828 as a small provincial school for children in the town and surrounding agricultural hinterland.

== Admissions ==
The school currently has approximately 1300 pupils and 128 members of staff. The school has 88 acres (360,000 m^{2}) of mature grounds situated on the Galgorm Road, just west of the town centre.

The school motto is Tenax Propositi meaning Steadfast in Purpose.

Following the August 2014 retirement of J. R. Hassard (announced on 19 November 2013), the appointment of Stephen Black (former headmaster at Antrim Grammar School) was announced on 7 March 2013; he became headmaster on 1 September 2014.

== Principals ==
No.	Name	Tenure
1	Rev. William Reeves	1847–1858
2	Rev. Robert King	1858–1900
3	William Fullerton	1900–1933
4	Joseph Fullerton	1933–1938
5	Wilson Bell	1939–1945
6	William Mol	1945–1974
7	Denis Jagoe	1974–1995
8	Peter Martin	1995–2004
9	Ronnie Hassard	2004–2014
10	Stephen Black	2014–2026

== Notable former pupils ==
- Marcus Rea, Ulster Rugby player
- Matty Rea, Ulster Rugby player
- Andrew Warwick, Ulster Rugby player
- John Andrew, Ulster Rugby player
- Stewart Moore, Ulster Rugby player
- Angus Kernohan, Ulster Rugby, Ealing Trailfinders player
- Matthew Shevlin, Irish League footballer, Ballymena United, Ards F.C, Linfield FC, Coleraine F.C
- John Alderdice, Baron Alderdice, Liberal Democrat peer, first Speaker of the Northern Ireland Assembly
- Kirsty Barr, Olympic Trap Shooter, Commonwealth Silver Medallist, World and European Silver Medallist, Olympian for Great Britain and Northern Ireland at the 2020 Tokyo Olympics
- William Booth CVO, chaplain
- Darwin Caldwell FREng, academic and expert in robotics who is Founding Director of the Italian Institute of Technology in Genoa, Italy, where he is also the Director of the Dept. of Advanced Robotics.
- Roger Casement, British diplomat and early human rights campaigner for the Congolese, later helped organise the Irish Volunteers and executed in 1916 under the Treason Act. Casement Park Ulster GAA grounds are named after him.
- Barry Cowan, journalist and broadcaster with BBC Northern Ireland
- George Dawson, DUP MLA from 2003 to 2007 for East Antrim
- George Alexander Duncan (1902–2005), (first) professor of political economy, Trinity College, Dublin and advocate of Austrian economics
- Steven Davis, Aston Villa, Glasgow Rangers, Southampton and Northern Ireland footballer
- Lucy Evangelista, Miss Northern Ireland 2005, placed in top ten at Miss World.
- Edgar Graham, Northern Irish Unionist political figure, assassinated by the IRA in 1983 at the age of 29
- George Hanna, Northern Irish Unionist politician and minister
- Air Vice-Marshal William Harbison CB CBE DFC, station commander from 1963 to 1965 of RAF Leuchars
- David Humphreys, Irish rugby union player
- Peter Johnston, Controller of BBC Northern Ireland (November 2006–present)
- Alan Jones, architect, professor at Queen's University Belfast and President of the Royal Institute of British Architects, 2019–21.
- Mark Logan, Conservative MP (2019-2024)
- Luke Marshall, is an Irish professional rugby union player, who currently plays for the Ulster Ravens
- James McAteer, Astrophysicist and author
- Commandant Vonla McBride - head of the WRNS 1976-9
- Willie John McBride, rugby union player. Captain of the Irish international team and British & Irish Lions rugby team
- Colin Murdock, former professional footballer, now lawyer
- James Sayers, professor of electron physics from 1946 to 1972 at the University of Birmingham, from 1939 to 1943 developed the cavity magnetron which was essential for centimetric radar, and later worked from 1943 to 1945 on the Manhattan Project
- Robert Simpson, Ulster Unionist MP (NI) from 1953 to 1972 for Mid Antrim
- Robin Swann, Ulster Unionist Party MP for South Antrim (2024–present); MLA (2011-2024) Party Leader (2017–2019), Minister for Health (2020-2024)
- Colin Wallace, former British soldier and psychological warfare operative, subject of a wrongful imprisonment case
- Neve Jones, professional rugby player for Gloucester-Hartpury in the PWR, Ulster at the regional, and Ireland at the international level. Tried to form a girls' rugby team for the school but was rejected.

== Sport ==
Sport is an important part of Ballymena Academy and the school is well known as one of the most successful in Northern Ireland, notably at rugby.

Head of girls' sport is Diane McNeill and head of boys' sport is John Nicholl.

The main boys' sport at Ballymena Academy is rugby. At the Kingspan Stadium, Belfast, the school won the 2010 Ulster Schools Cup final when they beat Belfast Royal Academy 10–7.In 2023 Ballymena Academy took another visit to the Kingspan Stadium where they played against Royal Belfast Academical Institution in the Ulster Schools Cup final. Previous wins were recorded in 1972 and 1981. The school has also won the Subsidiary Shield on seven occasions - more than any other school.

The Medallion (under 15) team has won the Medallion Shield twice, in 1970 and 2018. A share of the shield was secured twice after drawn finals.

In 2021, the school won the first ever Danske Bank U16s Schools Cup, beating Methodist College Belfast 29-17.

The main girls' sport is hockey and the Ulster Schools Cup has been won outright on six occasions. The trophy has also been shared a further three times after drawn finals. The most recent win was in 2001. Following this, they have proceeded to the Kate Russel All Ireland school girls hockey championship. In 2014 the 1XI reached the schools cup semi-final at Lisnagarvey, they lost on penalty flicks, after a 3–3 draw, to Rainey Endowed school.

== Coat of arms ==
The red hands are borrowed from the Adair family arms, who gave the 1-acre (4,000 m^{2}) of ground on which the original school was built, itself represented by the blue rectangle below. The worker ant represents hard work. The badger on the crest, accompanied by a lamp representing learning, is a pun on 'Brocklamont', site of the new school buildings, with 'brock' being an archaic word for badger (non-archaic Irish, "broc").

Sporting, academic, musical and other arts achievement are recognised by the award of a similar but distinctive coat of arms worn on the school blazer and also by the presentation of honours ties.

Coat of arms of Ballymena Academy

Crest
On a wreath Argent Azure and Gules in front of a demi badger Proper, an ancient lamp Or enflamed, also proper.
Escutcheon
Argent a humet Azure between in chief two dexter hands and in base an ant Gules.
Motto
Tenax Propositi
