= Crawford Mitchell =

Irish artist specialised in wood-engraving and lino-cuts

Crawford Mitchell ARCA ARUA
- Born: 5 October 1908; Belfast, Ireland
- Died: 26 November 1976 (aged 68)
- Education: Belfast School of Art
- Alma mater: Royal College of Art
- Known for: Printmaking

William Crawford Mitchell ARCA, ARUA (5 October 1908 – 26 November 1976) was an Ulster artist who specialized in lino-cuts and wood engraving.

== Early life and education ==
Crawford Mitchell was born on 5 October 1908, the son of Joseph Mitchell, a confectioner on the Grosvenor Road, Belfast, and his Scottish-born wife Catherine. Mitchell was the youngest of three children. He attended the Boys Model School, Belfast before gaining a scholarship from Dunville to study at the Belfast School of Art. In 1930 whilst a student at Belfast Art College, Mitchell won first prize in a competition at the Royal Dublin Society for his set of 3 nude life-drawings. He won a further scholarship to the Royal College of Art in 1932, where he studied alongside his cousin George MacCann, and MacCann's future wife Mercy Hunter.

== Career ==
Mitchell was a teacher who influenced several generations of children in the schools where he worked. In 1935 he taught part-time at Rainey Endowed School and at both Lurgan and Portadown Colleges. In 1950 he moved to the newly-opened Grosvenor High School at Roden Street in Belfast, where he remained until he retired in 1970. Following his retirement he concentrated on his printmaking and supplemented his income with part-time tuition at Rupert Stanley College of Further Education in Belfast. Mitchell was a longstanding member of the Art Teachers' Association in Northern Ireland.

Mitchell was also a set designer, occasional actor and theatre director with the Ulster Theatre from the 1930s. Whilst teaching at Grosvenor High School he created programmes and posters for school productions, designed sets, and also played instruments when necessary.

Mitchell was one of the original members of the Ulster Unit and showed 5 etchings in their inaugural exhibition at Locksley House, Belfast in December 1934. His contemporaries at the Ulster Unit included John Hewitt, Colin Middleton, John Luke, John Hunter, George MacCann and Kathleen Bridle. Mitchell's works in the exhibition were described by one critic as "each soundly competent" whilst another describes his Wayward Tree as "promising for this young artist".

In 1963 Mitchell showed alongside Colin Middleton, Dennis Osborne, Jean Osborne, TP Flanagan, Tom Carr, Cherith McKinstry, Wilfred Stewart, and David Crone in the Arts Council of Northern Ireland's New Gallery Painters Exhibition.

Mitchell showed several times at the Royal Ulster Academy, including 1965 when he presented a four coloured lino-cut, Gnarled Oak, with prints at a bargain price of £2. In the 1970 RUA annual show he offered Geese at Castleward. He won the silver medal at the Royal Ulster Academy's 94th annual show in 1975 for a lino-cut of Ballaghanery Church, Co, Down, one of the oldest ecclesiastical buildings in Ulster. In the same year Mitchell was elected as Associate Member of the RUA. In the following year he exhibited two works at the RUA, Grey Abbey and Yellow Water River, which critic Elizabeth Baird described as simply "outstanding".

In 1974 Mitchell joined the Masquers for their first exhibition. Formed in 1947 they were originally a play-reading group who embraced the visual arts in the pursuit of peace. Billed as showing 'Masquerpieces' the exhibition was held in the Centre Art Gallery at 150 Stranmillis Road in Belfast, where Mitchell showed alongside his wife Eileen, Mary Dugdale, and George Morrow. The same quartet of Masquers displayed work at the Centre Art Gallery in 1976, where Mitchell displayed ten works -five lino-cuts, four oils, and one gouache. The art critic Elizabeth Baird was impressed by Mitchell's work in the Masquers display:

"Working in lino Crawford Mitchell has produced some really excellent prints. Although often very detailed and intricate in cut and colour, 'Hillsborough' for example, they are invariably technically perfect and aesthetically very pleasing. There are several other local artists who work in lino but none can use and match colours as beautifully as Mr. Mitchell".

== Death and legacy ==
Crawford Mitchell died on 26 November 1976. He was 68 years old. Mitchell was survived by his wife Eileen (née Morrison) whom he had married in 1943, and his son Clive.

Mitchell's work was shown posthumously with the RUA in 1977, at the same time as a retrospective of 77 of his works showed at Rupert Stanley College on Tower Street, Newtownards. His work can be found in the collections of the British Council and the Victoria and Albert Museum.
