= Zoe Wilson =

Zoe Wilson may refer to:

- Zoe Wilson (Coronation Street)
- Zoe Wilson (field hockey) (born 1997), Irish field hockey player
