= Zoe Wilson (field hockey) =

Ireland women's hockey international (born 1997)

Personal information
- Born: 15 February 1997 (age 29) County Antrim, Northern Ireland
- Height: 168

Sport
- Sport: Field hockey
- Position: Defender/Midfielder
Youth career
- Years: Team
- 2004–2010: Ballyclare High School
Senior career
Years	Team	Caps	Goals
2012–2016	Randalstown	-	-
2015–2016	→ Syracuse Orange	-	-
2016–2017	Harvestehuder THC	-	-
2017–	Belfast Harlequins	-	-
National team
Years	Team	Caps	Goals
2016–	Ireland	74	-
Medal record
World Cup
Silver medal – second place	2018 London

Zoe Wilson (born 15 February 1997) is an Ireland women's field hockey international. She was a member of the Ireland team that played in the 2018 Women's Hockey World Cup final. She was also a member of the Syracuse Orange field hockey team that won the 2015 NCAA Division I Field Hockey Championship. This was the first time a Syracuse Orange women's team won a national championship.

== Early years, family and education ==
Wilson is the daughter of Debbie and Robert Wilson. She attended Ballyclare High School and Syracuse University and is currently studying nutrition at Ulster University at Coleraine.

== Club career ==
=== Ballyclare High School ===
Wilson, aged 14, scored the winning goal, a golden goal in extra time, for Ballyclare High School in the 2011–12 Ulster Senior Schoolgirls' Cup final as they defeated Lurgan College 2–1. A report in The News Letter declared "In the end, the result came down to a piece of sublime skill from Zoe Wilson who volleyed a chest high shot into the net, in the second period of extra-time." In October 2017 Wilson returned to Ballyclare as a volunteer coach.

=== Randalstown ===
Wilson began playing for Randalstown first-team when she was 15. On 26 December 2015, while on a break from Syracuse University, Wilson was a member of the Randalstown team that won the Ulster Shield. She also worked as an assistant coach with the team. In the final against Queen's University, Wilson scored a late equaliser. The game finished 2–2 before Randalstown eventually won 4–2 in a penalty shoot-out. After returning from Syracuse University permanently, Wilson continued to play for Randalstown during the second half of the 2015–16 season.

=== Syracuse Orange ===
In 2015 Wilson attended Syracuse University on a hockey scholarship. She subsequently helped Syracuse Orange win the 2015 NCAA Division I Field Hockey Championship. This was the first time a Syracuse Orange women's team won a national championship. In the final against North Carolina, Wilson scored the third goal in a 4–2 win. She was subsequently included in the NCAA All-Tournament Team Selection.

=== Harvestehuder THC ===
During the 2016–17 season, Wilson played for Harvestehuder THC in the Bundesliga. Wilson scored on her debut for Harvestehuder in a 2–1 win over Berliner HC.

=== Belfast Harlequins ===
In 2017 Wilson began playing for Belfast Harlequins in the Women's Irish Hockey League. Her teammates at Harlequins included Lizzie Colvin and Jenny McAuley. While playing for Harlequins, Wilson has also worked as a volunteer coach at both Ballyclare High School and for Armagh Hockey Club.

== Ireland international ==
Wilson represented Ireland at Under-16, Under-18 and Under-21 levels before making her senior debut. In July 2015 Wilson captained the Ireland U-18 team that won the EuroHockey Youth Championships II. She scored in final as Ireland defeated Poland 7–0. Elena Tice was also a member of the team.

In January 2016 Wilson was included in a squad for a series of away friendlies against Spain. On 15 January 2016 she made her senior debut in the opening game of series, a 3–0 win for Spain. In the third game of the series, on 18 January, Wilson scored her first senior goal for Ireland. She scored a late winner, from a penalty corner, as Ireland came back from 2–0 down to win 3–2. In January 2017 she was also a member of the Ireland team that won a 2016–17 Women's FIH Hockey World League Round 2 tournament in Kuala Lumpur. She scored in the final as Ireland defeated Malaysia 3–0 in the final. Wilson won her 50th cap at the 2017 Women's EuroHockey Nations Championship.

Wilson represented Ireland at the 2018 Women's Hockey World Cup and was a member of the team that won the silver medal. She featured in all of Ireland's games throughout the tournament, including the pool games against the United States, India, and England, the quarter-final against India, the semi-final against Spain and the final against the Netherlands.

Tournaments	Place
2016 Hawke's Bay Cup	5th
2016–17 Women's FIH Hockey World League	13th
→ 2017 Kuala Lumpur Tournament	1st
2017 Women's Four Nations Cup	2nd
2017 Women's EuroHockey Nations Championship	6th
2018 Women's Hockey World Cup	2nd place, silver medalist(s)
2018–19 Women's FIH Series Finals	2nd
2019 Women's EuroHockey Nations Championship	5th

== Honours ==
Ireland

- Women's Hockey World Cup
  - Runners Up: 2018
- Women's FIH Hockey World League
  - Winners: 2017 Kuala Lumpur
- Women's FIH Hockey Series
  - Runners Up: 2019 Banbridge
- Women's Four Nations Cup
  - Runners Up: 2017
- EuroHockey Youth Championships II
  - Winners: 2015

Syracuse Orange

- NCAA Division I Field Hockey Championship
  - Winners: 2015

Randalstown

- Ulster Shield
  - Winners: 2015–16

Ballyclare High School

- Ulster Senior Schoolgirls' Cup
  - Winners: 2011–12
