= Samuel Shephard =

Royal Marine

- Born: 20 July 1987 (age 39); Craigavon, County Armagh, Northern Ireland
- Military career
- Allegiance: United Kingdom
- Branch: Royal Marines
- Service years: 2011–present
- Rank: Captain
- Unit: 40 Commando
- Conflicts: War in Afghanistan
- Awards: George Cross

Captain Samuel John Shephard, GC (born 20 July 1987) is a former officer in the Royal Marines, who was awarded the George Cross in 2014 for his efforts to rescue a fellow officer, Lieutenant Damien "Day" Moran, during a diving exercise in El Qoseir, Egypt, the previous year. Sam founded 'Juice Jar' in 2019. It now operates 10 venues across the UK & Ireland, including Belfast, Dublin and Bristol.

== Early life and education ==
Shephard was born on 20 July 1987 in Craigavon, County Armagh, Northern Ireland. He was educated at The Royal School, Armagh as a day pupil. In March 2004, he was the youngest player to win the Rugby Schools Cup against Campbell College in the final at Ravenhill, Belfast. He studied at Queen's University, Belfast, and graduated with a Bachelor of Science degree in marine biology and a Master of Science degree in fisheries and aquaculture.

== Military career ==
On 5 September 2011, Shephard was commissioned in the Royal Marines as a second lieutenant; he was subsequently promoted to acting lieutenant. He was promoted to lieutenant on 13 December 2012, and to captain on 1 September 2013. In 2013, he served a four-month tour of duty in Afghanistan as part of the War in Afghanistan.

== Honours ==
On 3 October 2014, Shephard was awarded the George Cross (GC), the highest award in the United Kingdom honours system for gallantry "not in the face of the enemy". After his award he became a member and later trustee of the Victoria Cross and George Cross Association.

On 3 August 2013, Lieutenant Shephard Royal Marines was snorkelling in Egypt during a diving exercise when a fellow diver, who was also his friend, suffered an embolism and sank rapidly to the bottom. Shephard rescued his friend's body from a depth of approximately 60 metres. At 1700 hours, in fading light and tired after six hours in the water, the pair were snorkelling with four others off a shallow reef 200 metres from the shore. The other diver briefly surfaced with the others, lost consciousness, and sank rapidly to a depth estimated at 40 metres, where he lay bleeding from the nose and mouth. Amidst the panic Shephard immediately took command of the group. He alerted his colleagues and the Dive Instructor on the beach; prepared the group for an evacuation and for 25 minutes sought to rescue the casualty by descending alone, rapidly without air or equipment. A qualified and equipped Dive Instructor arrived within minutes but judged it too dark, deep and dangerous to mount a rescue. Without hesitation Shephard disregarded the instructor’s advice, took his equipment and attempted his own rescue. Without a weight belt he demanded that he be pushed below the surface by his comrades so that he could gain neutral buoyancy to enable him to swim down. Conscious that he was diving to the very edge of accepted safe limits, and following a series of dives that day, he knew the risk of decompression sickness, paralysis or even death, was significant as he made his descent in the fading light. He had to overcome tremendous upward forces, swimming down in less than 5 metres visibility, to reach the bottom. Disorientated, now in almost complete darkness, and with a perforated ear drum, he searched for and located the casualty suspended upside down on the reef. His dive watch recorded a depth over 60 metres, far in excess of his training and where the air he was breathing was extremely toxic. Despite the immediate danger, Shephard fought to free his friend, sustained deep lacerations to his legs in the process and, placing himself at even greater risk, removed his mask to give the lifeless diver two rescue breaths. Shephard, now with negative buoyancy, fought against the immense pressure forcing him down to carry the casualty’s limp body back to the surface. Dismissing the safety of a gradual ascent he risked a near certain severe decompression injury to get his friend to medical care. After 15 minutes in the gloomy water, and against his own expectation, he surfaced without incident. Shephard then led the ensuing evacuation, in the half light, over 200 metres of coral in bare and bloodied feet, providing continual emergency resuscitation until their arrival at the hospital. Unwavering throughout, he was focussed and extraordinarily composed during this most harrowing situation. Tragically, despite his heroic efforts, the casualty died. In the face of extreme known and manifest personal risk, Lieutenant Shephard showed truly exceptional courage and fortitude in his efforts to save the life of his friend. His unhesitating, selfless act, though ultimately unsuccessful, commands the highest national recognition.

— George Cross award from the London Gazette
