= Ivan Little =

Northern Irish actor

Ivan Little (born 1950) is a journalist and part-time actor from Northern Ireland.

== Journalism career ==
Little was born in September 1951, and began his career as a journalist working for The Portadown Times and the Belfast Telegraph. He moved into broadcasting by joining Downtown Radio. He joined Ulster Television as a reporter in 1980. In his career at UTV, he reported for Good Evening Ulster, Six Tonight and UTV Live.

Little took voluntary redundancy from the station in January 2009. At the time, he stated his intention to become a freelance journalist and to maintain an association with his employers of 29 years.

Since leaving UTV has penned occasional pieces for Belfast Telegraph. and co-edited Reporting the Troubles with his friend and fellow-retiree Deric Henderson.

== Stage career ==
Little has appeared on stage in the plays The Quare Gunk, Scenes from the Big Picture, Educating Rita and Dealer's Choice.

He most significant stage role was as Gerry Courtney in The History of the Troubles (according to my Da)'. This role, created for Little by Martin Lynch (writer), started as a short run in Belfast's Cathedral Quarter Arts Festival but took Little on tour across Britain and Ireland.

He appeared in a UTV documentary in 2007 discussing his involvement in the play's production.

On taking voluntary redundancy from UTV, Little stated in a newspaper interview his desire to devote more time to acting, confirming that he had two major roles in prospect.

Little has also appeared in the BBC Northern Ireland comedy Give My Head Peace from the late 1990s to mid 2000s.

== Personal life ==
Little attended Grosvenor Grammar School, Belfast and studied journalism at the Belfast College of Commerce. He published his autobiography Little by Little in 2005. He has two daughters, one of them being actress Emma Little Lawless.
