= John Dundee =

John Wharry Dundee OBE, (8 Nov 1921 - 1 Dec 1991) was an anaesthetist and prolific medical researcher from Ballyclare, County Antrim, Northern Ireland.

== Biography ==
=== Early life ===
Dundee was born the eldest son of a farmer, near Ballyclare, County Antrim, Northern Ireland. He was educated at Ballyclare High School, studied medicine at Queen's University Belfast, and undertook postgraduate studies at Liverpool, Oxford and Philadelphia. He graduated with a PhD from Liverpool University in 1957.

=== Career highlights ===
Dundee founded the Department of Anaesthetics at Queen's University Belfast in 1958. He was appointed Professor of Anaesthetics there in 1964—a post he held until his retirement in 1987. He worked as an anaesthetist in the Royal Victoria Hospital of Belfast, was a Fellow of the Faculty of Anaesthetists of the Royal College of Surgeons, and was Dean of the Faculty of Anaesthetists at the Royal College of Surgeons in Ireland. He presented the Joseph Clover Lecture in 1988.

A frequent international traveller, Dundee developed a great interest in acupuncture. One of his most notable achievements was the discovery that appropriate use of acupressure can provide relief of morning sickness in pregnant women. His 1988 report on this work, published in the Journal of the Royal Society of Medicine, demonstrates significant reduction of nausea and vomiting in a controlled trial.

Dundee originated many anaesthetic techniques which remain in use, and his extensive writings on the subject continue to be consulted. He was a principal researcher of the human and veterinary anaesthetic ketamine and assisted in the development of intravenous anaesthesia. He also assisted with the development of cyclomorph, a preparation combining morphine and cyclizine.

His "service to medicine in Northern Ireland" was acknowledged by the award of the Order of the British Empire in the 1989 New Year's Honours List. That year, he was also the first anaesthetist to be elected President of the Royal Academy of Medicine in Ireland. After his retirement, he was appointed Professor Emeritus and continued to undertake research into acupressure as an anti-emetic until his death, work which was sponsored by the Friends of Montgomery House, Belfast.

Besides receiving international awards and accolades in medicine, Dundee also held an internationally prestigious musical qualification (Associate of Trinity College London (ATCL). As a medical student, he had been an organist at Raloo Church near Larne. He continued to play the instrument in later life at church services throughout Northern Ireland, and he also sang in the choir at Windsor Presbyterian Church, Belfast. At various times, he was superintendent of Windsor Mission and a member of the board of Belfast City Mission. From 1985 to 1987, he was President of the Christian Medical Fellowship of UK and Ireland.
