= Ballyclare High School =

School in County Antrim, Northern Ireland

Coordinates: 54.754°N 6.002°W

- Ballyclare, Northern Ireland

Information
- Type: Grammar school
- Motto: Industria et Probitate
- School district: Education Authority
- Head of school: Dr M Rainey
- Enrollment: 1210
- Colours: Navy and red

Ballyclare High School is a co-educational, non-denominational grammar school in Ballyclare, County Antrim, Northern Ireland. There are approximately 1,200 pupils at the school, taught by around 80 students-teachers.

== History ==
The school was opened in the 1890s in the village of Doagh, a few miles south-west of Ballyclare. In 1902, the school was taken over by Miss Catherine Aiken, who in 1904, moved it to Ballyclare itself. In 1930, the school finally moved to its current premises on the Rashee Road in the town, designed by W.D.R. Taggart, FRIBA. In 1935, the current name of Ballyclare High School was officially adopted. In 2006, the school was awarded Investor in People.

== Sport ==
The Medallion (under 15) team won the Medallion Shield in 1990 when Coleraine Academical Institution were beaten 8-4 in the final at Ravenhill. The subsidiary Medallion Plate competition has been won four times in 1992, 1997, 1999 and 2003. The 1st XV won the Ulster Schools' Cup in 1973 and were runners up in 2012 to Royal Belfast Academical Institution. The 2012 team was coached by Mr Dan Soper and Mr G Shaw.

The 3rd XV shared the Ulster School' 3rd XV plate with Ballyclare Secondary School in 2016, winning the competition outright in 2020.

In boys' hockey, the school won the Burney Cup in 1931 and 1935. and also winning the Prior shield in 2012.

Girls hockey has risen to prominence in recent times, with the 1st team reaching the 2007 Ulster Senior Schoolgirls' Cup final in . In 2012 the senior girls 1st XI won the Ulster Senior Schoolgirls' Cup. The team was coached by Dr. Michelle Rainey and featured future Ireland and Scottish internationals including 2018 Women's Hockey World Cup silver medallist, Zoe Wilson, who scored the winner, aged 14. Goalkeeper Lucy Camlin went on to gain 25 caps as a Scottish International and has uniquely won both Senior Scottish and Irish League & Cup Doubles with Edinburgh club Watsonians and Ulster club Pegasus respectively

== Uniform ==
Uniform is compulsory at Ballyclare High School. All pupils wear a blazer - black for boys and navy for girls - with the school logo emblazoned on a pocket on the left. Special Emblems are worn by students who have received awards from the school, and those who represent the school for Ulster or Ireland may be awarded an "honours blazer" - this is a red blazer with an honours pocket.

Ties must be worn for all pupils. In first to fifth year, ties are diagonal stripes of the school's colours, red and navy. In Lower Sixth, pupils wear a tie that is mostly navy with intermittent, thin red stripes as well as a representation of the Ballyclare Mill which can be seen in the school's emblem. The Upper Sixth tie is similar to the first to fifth form tie, with a similar mill emblem to the Lower Sixth tie.

== Notable former pupils and staff ==
Notable Ballyclare High School Alumni
Name	Career	Years of attendance
Roy Beggs	Politician	
Stephen Boyd	Hollywood actor (birth name William Millar).	1940s
Andy Cairns	member of heavy metal band Therapy?	
Alan Duffy	Noted academic, astronomer, and science communicator	1990s
John Dundee	Noted anesthetist and medical researcher.	
John Jackson	Represented Ireland men's national field hockey team at the 2016 Summer Olympics.	1997–2003
Michael Nutt	2002 Commonwealth Games bronze medal winner in bowls	
Dick Strawbridge	Retired army officer, TV personality, environmentalist.	1970s
Jill Gallard	British Diplomat, Former Her Majesty's Ambassador To Germany & Portugal	1980s
Zoe Wilson	Ireland women's field hockey international and silver medallist at the 2018 Women's Hockey World Cup.	2004–2010

== Principals ==
No.	Name	Tenure
1	Catherine Aiken	1902–1923
2	Arthur Foweather	1923–1939
3	R E Russell	1939–1966
4	Joseph Williams	1966–1970
5	Cecil Millar	1971–1990
6	Robert Fitzpatrick	1990–2000
7	David Knox	2000–2015
8	Dr Michelle Rainey	2015–present
