= Darwin Caldwell =

Darwin Caldwell (born Ballymena, Northern Ireland) is a researcher and academic in robotics who is currently research director at the Italian Institute of Technology in Genoa, Italy. Besides other robots, he was involved in the development of the iCub, a small-size humanoid robot being designed by the RobotCub Consortium.

Caldwell has published over 600 papers and has received awards at several international conferences and events. He is visiting professor at the University of Sheffield, King's College London, University of Wales Bangor and University of Manchester.

Caldwell studied at Ballymena Academy and then completed his BSc and PhD in robotics from the University of Hull in 1986 and 1990 respectively, and completed an MSc in Management at the University of Salford in 1994

His research interests include innovative actuators and sensors, haptic feedback, force augmentation exoskeletons, dexterous manipulators, humanoid robotics (iCub), bipedal and quadrupedal robots, biomimetic systems, rehabilitation robotics, telepresence and teleoperation procedures, and robotics and automation systems for the food industry.

He was previously at the University of Salford between 1989 and 2007 as a lecturer, senior lecturer, reader and finally professor of Advanced Robotics in the Centre for Robotics and Automation between 1999 and 2007

He is currently chair of the IEEE Robotics and Automation Chapter (UKRI) and a past co-chair of the IEE (IET) Robotics and Mechatronics. He is on the editorial board of Industrial Robot as well as being guest editor of several journals.

In association with Professor John Gray of the University of Salford, he was responsible for the establishment of the Yorkshire Forward funded Centre for Food Robotics and Automation (CenFRA).
