= Omagh Academy =

Coordinates: 54.598°N 7.298°W

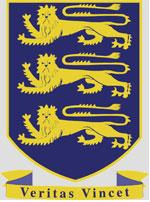

Location
- Dublin Road; Omagh, County Tyrone; Northern Ireland

Information
- Type: Controlled secondary school
- Motto: Veritas Vincet
- Established: 1903
- Local authority: WELB
- Principal: Ruth Maxwell
- Gender: Mixed
- Age: 11 to 18
- Enrolment: c. 670
- Houses: Camowen, Strule, Drumragh
- Colours: Yellow, Navy
- Website: https://www.omaghacademy.com

Omagh Academy is a grammar school in Omagh, County Tyrone, located at 21-23 Dublin Road. As of 2018, the school had approximately 670 pupils. The school is one of the top performing grammar schools in Northern Ireland and is ranked one of the top 30 Grammar Schools in the UK. In 2014, there was a 100% pass rate at GCSE Level, 82% pass rate at A-Level, and 69% achieved 5 A*-C grades at GCSE.

The School's motto is "Veritas Vincet" which is Latin and translates as "Truth will conquer".

The school offers 21 subjects at GCSE and 19 at 'A'-level.

== Sport ==
The school also contributes to schools sport in Northern Ireland. The 1st hockey team won the Northern Ireland Schools' Cup and the All Ireland Cup in 2005. The 1st XV rugby team reached the Ulster Schools Cup final in 1985 (losing to Bangor Grammar 12-3) and semi-final in 1993 (losing to eventual winners Campbell College). In 1994 they had success capturing the Schools Plate competition with a win over Campbell College, and in the same year Omagh Academy won the Medallion Plate competition with a win over Portadown College. In 2006, Omagh Academy won the Medallion Bowl, beating Rainey in the final. In 2015 they beat Strabane Academy to win the Medallion Trophy, and in 2019 they beat Down High School 17-11 to win the Medallion Bowl.

== Notable alumni ==
- Category:People educated at Omagh Academy
