= The Royal School, Armagh =

Grammar school in Armagh, Northern Ireland

Coordinates: 54.352°N 6.648°W

The Royal School
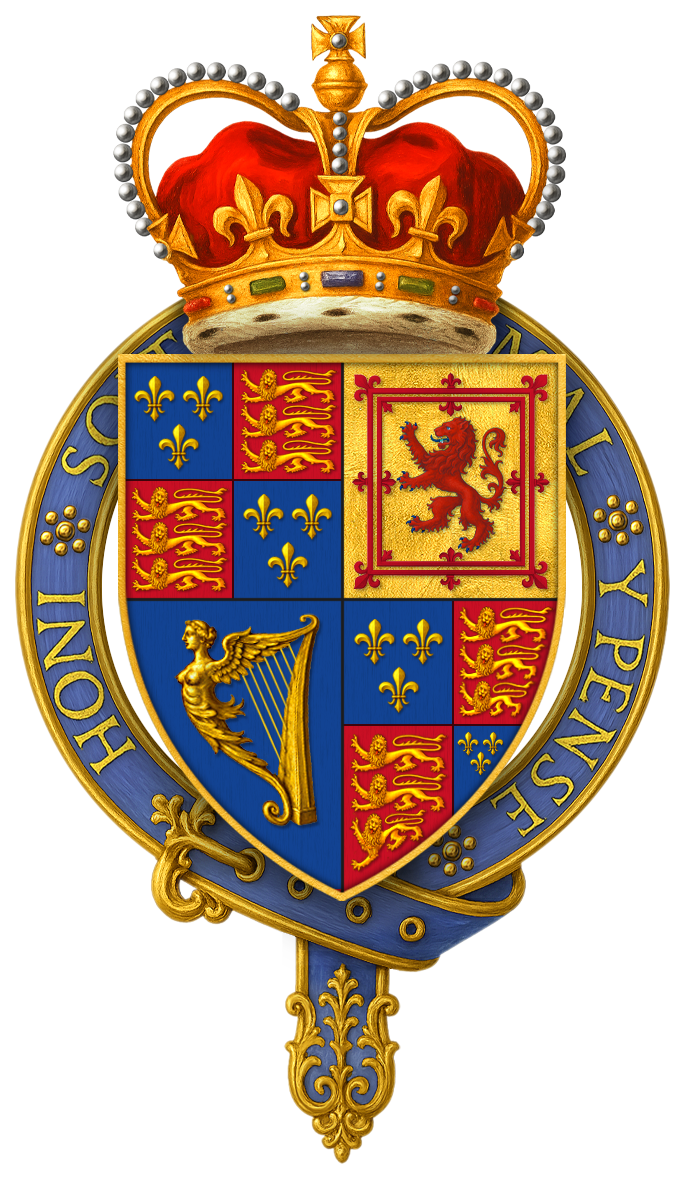

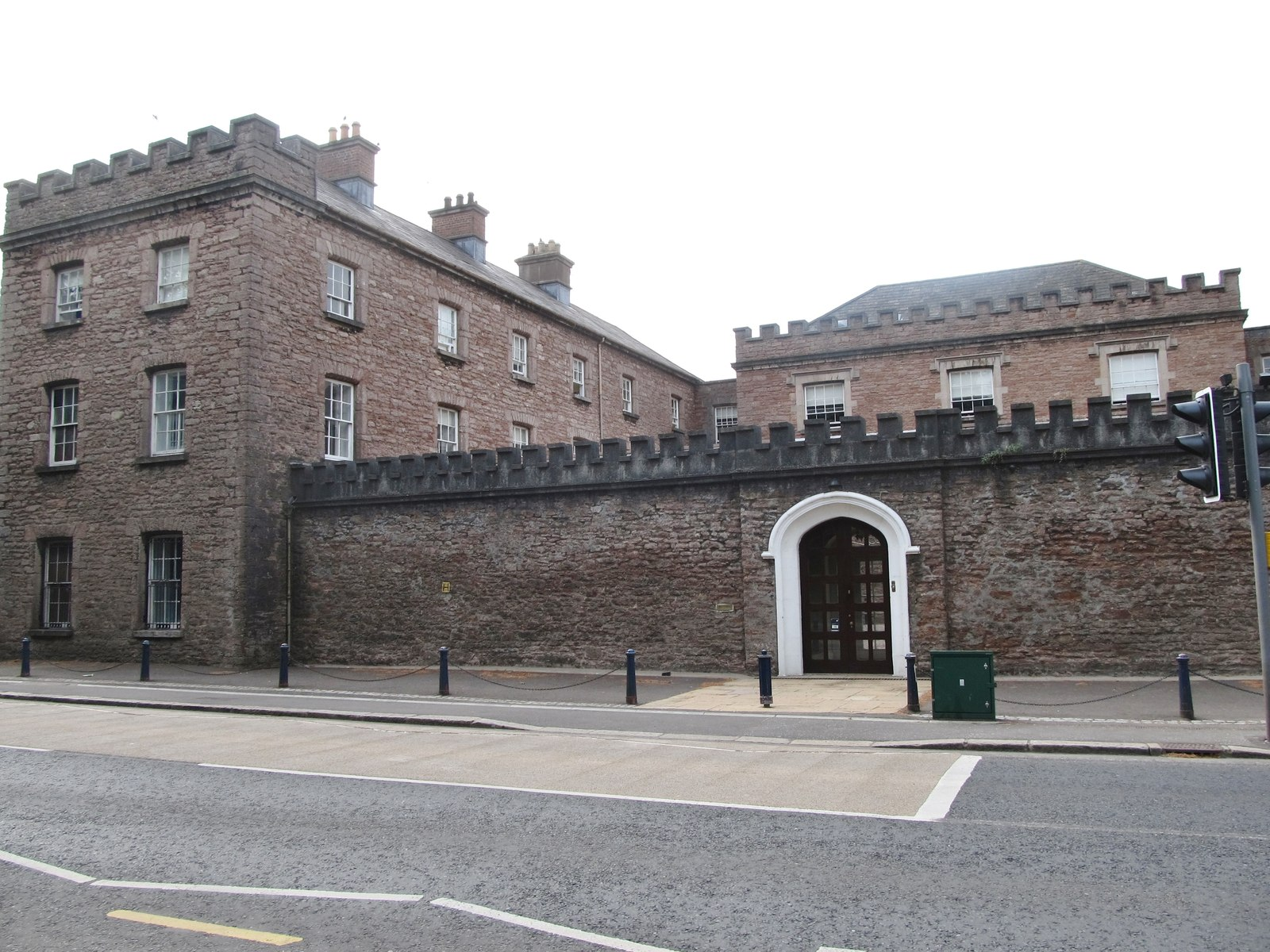
- Entrance to the school in 2016.
- College Hill, Armagh BT61 9DH, Northern Ireland; United Kingdom

Information
- Type: Voluntary Grammar
- Motto: For the increase of learning and good manners
- Religious affiliation: Church of Ireland
- Established: 1608; 418 years ago
- Gender: Coeducational
- Alumni: Old Armachians
- Website: royalschool.com

The Royal School, Armagh is a co-educational voluntary grammar school in Armagh, Northern Ireland. Founded in 1608 by King James I as one of a group of schools established during the Plantation of Ulster, it moved to its present site on College Hill in the 1770s. Originally a boys' school, it became co-educational in 1986 when it amalgamated with Armagh Girls' High School. It is a member of the Headmasters' and Headmistresses' Conference.

The school has a long association with schools rugby union in Ulster. It won the inaugural Ulster Schools Cup and seven of the competition's first ten editions, and won the cup again in 2004. That year, its girls' hockey team also won the Kate Russell Cup.

== History ==
One of a number of free schools created in 1608 by King James I of England & Ireland, the school was to educate the sons of local Protestant merchants and farmers during the plantation of Ulster. It has four "sister" schools: Royal School Dungannon in Dungannon, Enniskillen Royal Grammar School in Enniskillen, the Royal School Cavan in Cavan, and the Royal and Prior School in Raphoe. In November 2013 the school was placed 78th in The Sunday Times Top 200 UK Schools Guide for results at A level and GCSE combined. In May 2014, an inspection by the Education and Training Inspectorate found the leadership and management of the school to be 'outstanding'.

Originally intended to be sited at Mountnorris, the turbulent situation in Ulster at the time led to a move to the relative safety of Armagh city. Despite this, an early headmaster of the school, John Starkey, and his family, were drowned by insurgents during the 1641 Rebellion. The school arrived at its current 27-acre (110,000 m^{2}) site on College Hill in the 1770s. A boys' school from its inception, the school was amalgamated with Armagh Girls' High School in 1986 to become co-educational.

Each pupil is assigned to a house – Darcy, Rokeby, Beresford or Armstrong – which are named after former Church of Ireland archbishops. Successive archbishops have chaired the board of governors for over four centuries. In 2008, the school celebrated its quatercentenary along with the four other 1608 Royal Schools. To mark the occasion, Queen Elizabeth II and Prince Philip, Duke of Edinburgh, visited the school. A history of the 1608 Royal Schools was produced in the same year by former headmaster, Thomas Duncan.

== Royal sport ==
The school was the inaugural winner of the rugby union Ulster Schools Cup, beating Royal Belfast Academical Institution after three replays. They won it again the next year and continued to dominate the early years of the competition, winning it seven times in the first ten years. Fortunes waned after this, with only three finals contested between the victories in 1885 and 1977, none of which was won by the school. However, the school did not compete in the competition for around fifty years following the death of a pupil during a match in 1928.

The school won the Schools Cup in 2004, beating Campbell College in the final. John McCall, the captain of that team, died 10 days after the final while playing for the Ireland U19 rugby team in the IRB U19 World Championship in South Africa. He had been told of his selection for this team on the day of the Schools Cup final. A few months later, a second member of the squad, Todd Graham, was killed in a road accident while visiting his parents at their home in Zambia. These tragedies brought perspective to what had been an otherwise successful year, with the school becoming the first school since Methodist College Belfast in 1936 – and only the second school ever – simultaneously to hold the schools cups for rugby and girls' hockey. The cricket 1st XI were beaten semi-finalists in their equivalent competition. The girls' hockey team won the Kate Russell all-Ireland hockey trophy on the day that John McCall died.

== Notable alumni ==
The Old Armachians is a social organisation consisting of former pupils of the Royal School. Although at one time the Royal School educated politicians and novelists, its most recent notable exports have been rugby players.

- Tommy Bowe – Irish rugby international and British and Irish Lion
- Robert Stewart, Viscount Castlereagh (1769–1822) – British Foreign Secretary 1812–1822
- Frederic Charles Dreyer – Captain of HMS Iron Duke at the Battle of Jutland, British representative at the League of Nations Military Committee
- Mervyn A. Ellison (1909–1963) – astronomer
- Sir Reg Empey – Leader of the Ulster Unionist Party (2005–10)
- Willie Faloon – flanker for Connacht Rugby
- Frank Harris (1855–1931) – British editor, novelist, short story writer, journalist and publisher
- John Lennox – professor of mathematics at the University of Oxford
- George Green Loane (1865–1945) – classical scholar, schoolmaster, editor, and author
- Sir John Hall Magowan – British ambassador to Venezuela 1948–1951
- Richard Maunsell (1868–1944) – chief mechanical engineer of the Great Southern and Western Railway of Ireland and the Southern Railway of England
- Stuart Neville (b. 1972) – author best known for his novel The Twelve or, as it is known in the United States, The Ghosts of Belfast
- Edward Pakenham (1778–1815) – British Army general
- Thomas Preston (1860–1900) – scientist whose research was concerned with heat, magnetism, and spectroscopy
- Samuel Shephard – recipient of the George Cross and a serving Officer in the Royal Marine Commandos
- John Taylor, Baron Kilclooney – deputy leader of the UUP from 1995 to 2001
- Richard Wellesley, 1st Marquess Wellesley (1760–1842)– Lord Lieutenant of Ireland and Governor General of India, attended the Royal School in the 1770s
