= Grosvenor Grammar School =

Controlled grammar school in Belfast, County Antrim, Northern Ireland

Location
- Marina Park; Belfast, County Down, BT5 6BA; Northern Ireland; 54.58353°N 5.87575°W

Information
- Former name: Grosvenor High School
- Type: Grammar School
- Religious affiliation: Inter-denominational
- Established: 1945; 81 years ago
- Status: Open
- Local authority: Education Authority
- Principal: Dr Frances Vasey
- Staff: 73 (excludes any Non-Teaching Staff)
- Gender: Co-educational
- Age: 11 to 18
- Enrolment: 1203 (2024/25)
- Capacity: 1170
- Colour
- Website: www.grosvenorgrammarschool.org.uk

Grosvenor Grammar School (formerly Grosvenor High School) is an 11–18 co-educational, grammar school and sixth form in Belfast, Northern Ireland.

== History ==
Grosvenor Grammar School was founded in 1945 as Grosvenor High School, by the Belfast Corporation, to cope with the increase in demand for grammar-school education in the area. It was sited on Roden Street, off Grosvenor Road, and remained there until 1958, when the school moved to Cameronian Drive in the east of the city. In 2010, the school moved to its present location, Marina Park.

In order to avoid confusion with non-grammar 'high schools', the school changed its name in 1993 to Grosvenor Grammar School.

Although the school considers itself inter-denominational, within the major religious communities in Northern Ireland, a majority of its students are from the Protestant community, with 42% of its 2024/25 enrollment identifying as such. Only 7% of its enrollment, from the same year, came from the Roman Catholic community.

On 19 December 2014, the then principal, Robin McLoughlin, made his final speech at Grosvenor before moving on to Banbridge Academy. The school's first headmistress, Dr Frances Vasey, subsequently took over the role of principal.

== Sport ==
In rugby, the school has won the Ulster Schools Cup once in 1983 and the Schools Shield once in 1972. At medallion level the school has won the Medallion Plate once in 2019 and the Medallion Bowl once in 2013.

In football, Grosvenor has also had some success in the Ulster School's Cup, with wins in 2016 and 2017.

== Notable former pupils ==
- Jim Bennett, museum director and historian of science
- George Best, professional footballer
- Nathan Connolly, musician
- Ivan Little, journalist and actor
- Samuel James Patterson, mathematician
- Gavin Robinson, Democratic Unionist Party leader and MP for Belfast East
- Ross White, director and Academy Award and BAFTA winner for An Irish Goodbye
- Christopher J. H. Wright, theologian and author

== Notable staff ==
- Sammy Wilson, former economics teacher
- Michelle McIlveen, taught history and politics
- Willie Anderson, former PE teacher
- Kyle McCallan, teacher from 2005 to 2016, took a job in the PE department
- Andrew White, joined in September 2007

== See also ==
- List of grammar schools in Northern Ireland
