= Carrickfergus Grammar School =

Location
- North Road; Carrickfergus, Antrim, BT38 7RA; Northern Ireland; 54.729242°N 5.816703°W

Information
- Type: Controlled Grammar
- Motto: Praestantia (excellence)
- Established: 1962
- Local authority: Education Authority
- Specialist: Science
- Chairman of the Board of Governors: Maurice Smith
- Headmaster: James A. Maxwell
- Staff: 70
- Gender: Coeducational
- Age: 11 to 18
- Enrolment: c. 800
- Houses: Castle, Fergus, Knockagh and Thornfield
- Colours: Maroon, Navy blue & White
- Website: http://www.carrickfergusgrammar.com/

Carrickfergus Grammar School is a controlled grammar school situated in Carrickfergus, County Antrim, Northern Ireland. Since opening in 1962 with 60 pupils and 4 teachers, its pupil numbers have increased to just over 800 pupils from ages 11 to 18 in Years 8 to 14.

The school is situated on the former site of Thornfield Manor, overlooking the town of Carrickfergus, and has a view of Carrickfergus Castle and Belfast Lough.

The school is known for its sporting achievements, especially in rugby, hockey, and football and its music department, including the senior choir, which often performs in high-profile venues, such as The National Concert Hall in Dublin, and has made numerous television appearances.

== History ==
The school was founded in 1962 with just 60 pupils, but now accommodates approximately 800 students and 70 staff. In 2018, the school was the second top Controlled Grammar in Northern Ireland for GCSE Results.

The school was expanded to deal with an increase in numbers when an extension was built in 1983.The motto changed to Præstantia, the school crest was replaced with a new logo and the school colours changed to reflect better the diversity of the school community. The school continued to grow, and in 1999 was the first grammar school in Northern Ireland to achieve the Investors in People award. It was also later awarded the Goldmark by the Northern Ireland Sports Council for the quality of its physical education. In 2008, the school achieved specialist school status, specialising in science, and was awarded the International School Award in recognition of its work encouraging global awareness in school.

In 2009, the school achieved its first major school sports trophy for rugby in recent years, winning the Ulster Schools Trophy. In 2012, the school had more success, winning the Northern Bank Medallion Bowl.

The school's first principal was J McK Grainger, founding the school with 60 pupils. Grainger was at the school until his retirement in 1977, when he was succeeded by H Jamison, who was principal until 1989. K Irwin succeeded Jamison in 1990, and stayed in the position until his retirement in 2009. K Mulvenna took over the principalship in 2009 and retired in April 2019. Past principals have facilities within the school named after them, such as the Grainger Centre, the Jamison Room, and Irwin Park. The current principal is J A Maxwell.

== Houses ==
There are four school houses, Castle, Fergus, Knockagh and Thornfield, and new students are assigned to one of these houses when they arrive. A Boys' and Girls' House Captain and Vice-Captain are elected each year by members of Year 13.

== Notable former pupils ==
- John Stewart, Ulster Unionist Party politician, MLA
