= Annadale Grammar School =

School in Belfast, Northern Ireland

Coordinates: 54.571°N 5.919°W

Location
- Belfast; Northern Ireland

Information
- Motto: Virtus Fortunae Comes (Fortune favours the brave)
- Closed: 1990 (became Wellington College Belfast)
- Gender: Boys
- Houses: Alexander; Alanbrooke; Dill; Montgomery
- Song: De Brevitate Vitae

Annadale Grammar School for Boys was an all-boys school located on the Annadale Embankment skirting the River Lagan in south Belfast, Northern Ireland. In 1990, Annadale Grammar School (all boys) amalgamated with Carolan Grammar School (all girls) and became known as Wellington College Belfast.

== Name ==
The name "Annadale" originated from Anne Hill (later, briefly, Anne Hill-Trevor), mother of Field Marshal The 1st Duke of Wellington. Wellington's maternal grandfather, Arthur Hill (later created, in 1766, the 1st Viscount Dungannon), lived at Belvoir House on the Belvoir Estate near Knockbreda and had married Anne Stafford in 1737. They bore three children, a boy and two girls. In 1759, their eldest daughter, Anne, married the then 2nd Baron Mornington (who, in 1760, was created the 1st Earl of Mornington) and herself bore two sons and a daughter – Penelope Prudence, Richard and Arthur, the future Duke of Wellington. The site on which the school was built was originally known as Anna's Dale, a name referred to in letters from the Duke to his mother which are now held by the school. The school also possesses an oil painting of the area as it was at the time of Wellington and reputedly shows the famous Molly Ward's Tavern, an important meeting place during the time of the United Irishmen.

== Badge ==
Annadale Grammar School colours were red, black and white. The school badge, worn on the breast pocket of the black school blazer, was the "cockatrice" which is associated with the Duke of Wellington's coats of arms. Until its amalgamation in 2006 the cockatrice provided the Regimental capbadge of the Duke of Wellington's Regiment. It remains on the capbadge of the contemporary Yorkshire Regiment.

The school motto was "Virtus Fortunae Comes" meaning "Fortune favours the brave" – Wellington's motto.

The school song was "De Brevitate Vitae (On the Shortness of Life)", perhaps more commonly known by its first words "Gaudeamus Igitur (Let Us Therefore Rejoice)". This is a very old and popular academic song in many European countries.

The four school houses were named after Irish generals in the Second World War (all of them Ulstermen or of Ulster origin): Alexander; Alanbrooke; Dill; Montgomery.
