= Belfast Boys' Model School =

Boys only secondary school in Belfast, Northern Ireland

Location
- Ballysillan Road; Belfast, County Antrim, BT14 6RB; Northern Ireland; 54.630°N 5.963°W

Information
- Former name: Belfast Model School
- Type: Secondary
- Established: 1857; 169 years ago
- Authority: BELB
- Headmistress: Mary Montgomery
- Gender: Boys
- Website: www.bbms.org.uk

Belfast Boys' Model School (formerly Belfast Model School or Belfast District Model School) is a boys only secondary school in Belfast, Northern Ireland.

== History ==
During its long history, the Belfast Model School has been located on three sites:

- Divis Street 1857–1922
- Cliftonville Road 1922–1954
- Ballysillan Road (boys) since 1957

Building of the Belfast District Model School began in Divis Street in 1854, on a 100-acre tract of land leased by the Commissioners of Education in Ireland, and the school was opened on 19 May 1857. It was to be a model for all other schools in the district, and the thirteenth of its kind. On 22 December 1879, John Perry, president of the Institution of Electrical Engineers, highlighted the Belfast Model as an example to be followed in a proposed reform of technical education in England.

During riots and arson attacks surrounding the consideration of the Anglo-Irish Treaty in May 1922, the Divis Street premises were burned down. Premises were purchased in Cliftonville Road and classes resumed in Cliftonville Lodge, until a new building was opened in 1937. The Belfast Model remained on Cliftonville Road until implementation in 1954 of the Tripartite System, under the Education Act (Northern Ireland) 1947, caused the school to split into separate boys' and girls' schools. The Belfast Boys' Model School began operations in Ballysillan Road in 1957, while the Cliftonville Road premises became the site of present-day Cliftonville Integrated Primary School.

Notable Alumni

== See also ==
- Belfast Model School for Girls
- List of secondary schools in Belfast
