= Belfast High School =

Location
- 740 Shore Road, Jordanstown; Newtownabbey, County Antrim, BT37 0PX; Northern Ireland; 54.68678302189467°N 5.876565727605159°W

Information
- Other name: BHS
- Type: Voluntary grammar school
- Established: 1854
- Founder: John Pyper
- Local authority: Education Authority
- Principal: Michael Lowry
- Gender: Co-educational
- Houses: Boyd; Pyper; Storey; Watson
- Colours: Blue and Yellow
- Website: www.belfasthigh.org.uk

Belfast High School (BHS) is a co-educational voluntary grammar school in Jordanstown, Newtownabbey, County Antrim, Northern Ireland. It was established in 1854 and is within the North Eastern Region of the Education Authority.

In May 2007, it was awarded Specialist Status in Languages and in March 2012, it has been recognised as one of only six post-primary schools in Northern Ireland to be in the top 10% for performance at both GCSE and A-level.

== History ==
The institution now known as Belfast High School opened in 1854. In 1874, it moved to new premises at Glenravel Street, Belfast. Since the school was founded, there have been 7 head teachers:

- (1854–1867) John Pyper, who established the school as Pyper Academy, before changing its name to the Belfast Mercantile Academy shortly thereafter.
- (1867–1917) James Pyper, the school's longest-serving headmaster. He was responsible for the building of what the Ulster Star described as "Mr Pyper's splendid new seminary" in Glenravel Street.
- (1917–1937) Spring Pyper
- (1938–1966) Dr Robert Harte, who changed the school's name to its current title. Under his headship the school purchased Ardilea House, a large 19th-century villa in Jordanstown, in 1953. Between then and 1963, when the entire school re-located from Glenravel Street, its then Vice-Principal, Harry Towell, headed a small suburban campus at the site. The house now forms the administration block, containing the staff room, sick bay, and offices of the principal, her secretary, the bursar and vice-principal. Dr Harte suffered a severe stroke in 1964 and his son acted as temporary head until the appointment of Mr Dunlop in 1966. Dr Harte was a Doctor of Philosophy and an eminent classical scholar.
- (1966–1987) Samuel H Dunlop, who saw the building of a new science block (1970), the closure of Somerton House (the school's preparatory department) in 1981 and the enlargement of the school library (1980s)
- (1987–2006) Stephen R Hilditch, who saw the Harte Building opened in the 1990s to house Home Economics, Careers, Technology, ICT and a science lab, the refurbishment of the science block (2001–2003) and the refurbishment and enlargement of the Music Department
- (2006–2018) Lynn F Gormley, who saw the installation of a state-of-the-art sports and fitness building which was opened by Dame Mary Peters in 2016.
- (2018–2026) Charlotte Weir, who had previously served as Acting Head Teacher and Deputy Head Teacher.
- (2026–present) Michael Lowry, who had previously acted as Vice Principal.

== Houses ==
The school has a house system. The tie a pupil wears is blue with a thick yellow band pattern, and a thinner band pattern of an additional colour representing the pupil's house.

The houses and their colours are on the list below.

- Boyd (The Green House)
- Pyper (The Blue House)
- Storey (The Red House)
- Watson (The Yellow House)

== Sports ==
The main sport at Belfast High are rugby, hockey, netball, and cricket.

Aside from the four main sports, Belfast High students take part in association football, gymnastics, swimming, volleyball, basketball, badminton, athletics, tennis, softball, and power walking.

Two sixth-form students represent the school as Sports Ambassadors to encourage participation in sports among students.

== Notable alumni ==
- Steve Aiken, Member of the Northern Irish Assembly
- George Cassidy, former Bishop of Southwell and Nottingham
- Tommy Cassidy, Northern Ireland international footballer, who played for Newcastle United and Burnley
- Edward Samuel Wesley de Cobain, MP, disgraced Conservative politician
- Bev Craig, Mayor of Greater Manchester since August 2026; formerly the Leader of Manchester City Council from December 2021 to early August 2026.
- Fred Henderson, Socialist writer
- George MacDowell Kane, Artist and sculptor
- Alex Crawford, international footballer: Distillery and Cliftonville right-half and Captain of Ireland in 1880s and 1890s
- Jonny Evans, Manchester United and Northern Ireland international football player
- Sir Ronnie Flanagan, the first Chief Constable of the Police Service of Northern Ireland (PSNI); Sir Ronnie also served as the very last Chief Constable of the RUC
- Alan McNeill, professional football player
- Stephen Rea, film actor
- Mark McCrea, Ulster rugby player
- Maurice Field, former Ulster and Ireland rugby player
- Paul Stirling, Ireland cricketer
- Sinéad Morrissey, poet
- Harold Miller, the former Church of Ireland Bishop of Down and Dromore.

== See also ==
- List of grammar schools in Northern Ireland
