= Ballyclare Secondary School =

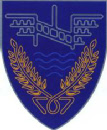

Location
- Ballyclare, Northern Ireland; 54°45′04″N 6°00′18″W

Information
- Type: Secondary school
- School district: NEELB
- Principal: Kathryn Bell
- Enrollment: 1040
- Colour: Royal Blue
- Website: ballyclaresecondary.co.uk

Ballyclare Secondary School is a co-educational school in Ballyclare, County Antrim, Northern Ireland.

== Overview ==
The school caters for ages 11–19 and was established in 1961. The current number of children on roll is approximately 1000 pupils with a teaching staff of 64. The principle is Kathryn Bell The school buildings were enlarged and modernised in 1993.

The school is linked with Toyama National College of Maritime Technology and this connection has been in existence for over ten years.

In 2009, the school received a fund of £1,776 from the charity Business in the Community as part of the programme "Adopt a School". The fund was to allow pupils from year 11 to partake in self-improvement and business awareness programmes as well as past pupil presentations.

In 2018, the school received the Top Investor in Careers National Quality Award recognised by Ofsted.

In 2021, the school was investigated by the Education Authority over the health and wellbeing of its staff and over inappropriate use of finances.

== Principals ==
No.	Name	Tenure
1	Bill Sterling	1961–1985
2	Uel McCrea	1985–2010
3	Kathryn Bell	2010–present
