= Regent House School =

Grammar school in Northern Ireland

Coordinates: 54.590°N 5.704°W

Regent House Grammar School

Location
- Circular Road; Newtownards, Down, BT22 4QA; Northern Ireland

Information
- Type: Controlled grammar school Preparatory School
- Religious affiliation: Non-denominational
- Established: 1924; 102 years ago
- Status: Open
- Local authority: Education Authority
- Principal: Mrs Julie Haugh
- Gender: Co-educational
- Age: 4 to 18; Prep is 4-11, grammar school is 11-18
- Enrolment: Grammar School; 1486 (2024/25); Prep Department; 95 (2024/25)
- Capacity: Grammar School; 1450
- Houses: Castlereagh; Clandeboye; Scrabo; Strangford
- Colours: (Boys) (Girls)
- School fees: Free
- Website: regenthouse.org.uk

Regent House School is a co-educational, controlled grammar school in Newtownards, County Down, Northern Ireland. The school comprises two parts: the grammar school and the preparatory department. Its current enrollment is 1486 (2024/25) students within the grammar school and 95 (2024/25) within the prep department.

Regent House considers itself to be non-denominational, however, its current statistics show students at the school to be 57% Protestant, 7% Roman Catholic and 36% other.

The school is divided into four houses: Castlereagh, Clandeboye, Scrabo and Strangford.

== Inspections ==
The school was inspected by the Controlled Schools' Support Council in 2015 and judged Satisfactory. In 2019 another inspection was carried out, but could not reach a judgement because of industrial action being taken by staff.

== Music ==
In 2017 the school's choir won BBC Radio Ulster School Choir of the Year. In 2024 the chamber choir placed third in the UK in the Barnardos National Choral Competition.

== Notable former pupils ==
Name	Notability	Ref
Jim Allister	MP, leader of the Traditional Unionist Voice (TUV), former MLA	
Nigel Carr	Former British Lions rugby player	
David Coulter	Minister in the Church of Scotland, Chaplain General in the British Army	
Holly Hamilton	BBC journalist and presenter	
Simon Hamilton	Politician (Democratic Unionist Party), former MLA	
Eddie Irvine	Formula One driver	
Phillip Matthews	Former Ireland rugby union international	
Maxine Mawhinney	BBC newsreader	
Lieutenant-Colonel Robert Blair "Paddy" Mayne DSO & 3 Bars	Founding member of the SAS, former British Lions rugby player	
Rhys McClenaghan	Olympic gymnast, gold medalist for Ireland at the 2024 Summer Olympics	
Michael McGimpsey	Former Ulster Unionist Party politician, former MLA	
Catherine Jean Milligan	Former Miss Northern Ireland	
Colin Murray	Broadcaster	
Ottilie Patterson	Blues singer with the Chris Barber jazz band	
