= Antrim Grammar School =

Location
- 10 Steeple Road; Antrim, BT41 1AF; Northern Ireland; 54.723°N 6.212°W

Information
- Other name: AGS
- Type: Grammar School
- Motto: "Educating for Life"
- Established: 1974
- Chairman: Roger McCune MBE
- Principal: Martin Wilson
- Age range: 11-18
- Enrollment: 820
- Colour: Navy/ gold
- Website: www.antrimgrammar.org

Antrim Grammar School is a co-educational grammar school in Northern Ireland. It is in County Antrim, in the North Eastern Region of the Education Authority. It is more commonly known by locals as "AGS". It has two neighbouring schools, Parkhall Integrated College and the Steeple Nursery School.

== History and performance ==
Antrim Grammar School was founded in 1974 to address the growing need for a secondary school due to an increasing population in the Antrim area.

It has long been one of the top grammar schools in Northern Ireland and the United Kingdom. In 2019, the school achieved its highest ever A-level results, an improvement on the previous year's, which were also record breaking.

In 2020, the Sunday Times placed Antrim Grammar in the Top 20 Schools in Northern Ireland for GCSE and A level examination success. 98% of GCSE students achieved 7 or more A*-C grades, including English and Mathematics and 92% of A level students achieved 3 A*-C grades.

== Principals ==
No.	Name	Tenure
1	Stanley Spence	1974–1989
2	Jim Hunniford	1989–2001
3	Janet Williamson	2001–2006
4	Stephen Black	2007–2014
5	Hilary Woods	2014–2017
6	Jenny Lendrum	2017–2022
7	Martin Wilson	2022–present

== International school ==
The school was accredited as an international school by the British Council. Four schools in Northern Ireland were accredited in 2006; other NI schools had already been accredited over the previous several years. This award is presented to schools for their work in promoting international awareness among students and staff. Previously the school has won numerous awards including the CICA award in 1994.

The school regularly has Language Weeks where pupils from various cultures teach the rest of the pupils their chosen language. They also take many trips, including school visits to America, Iceland, Rome, Paris, Poland, Bolivia, Italy, France and South Africa. This work and its continuation helped to secure Antrim Grammar International School accreditation.

== Modernisation ==
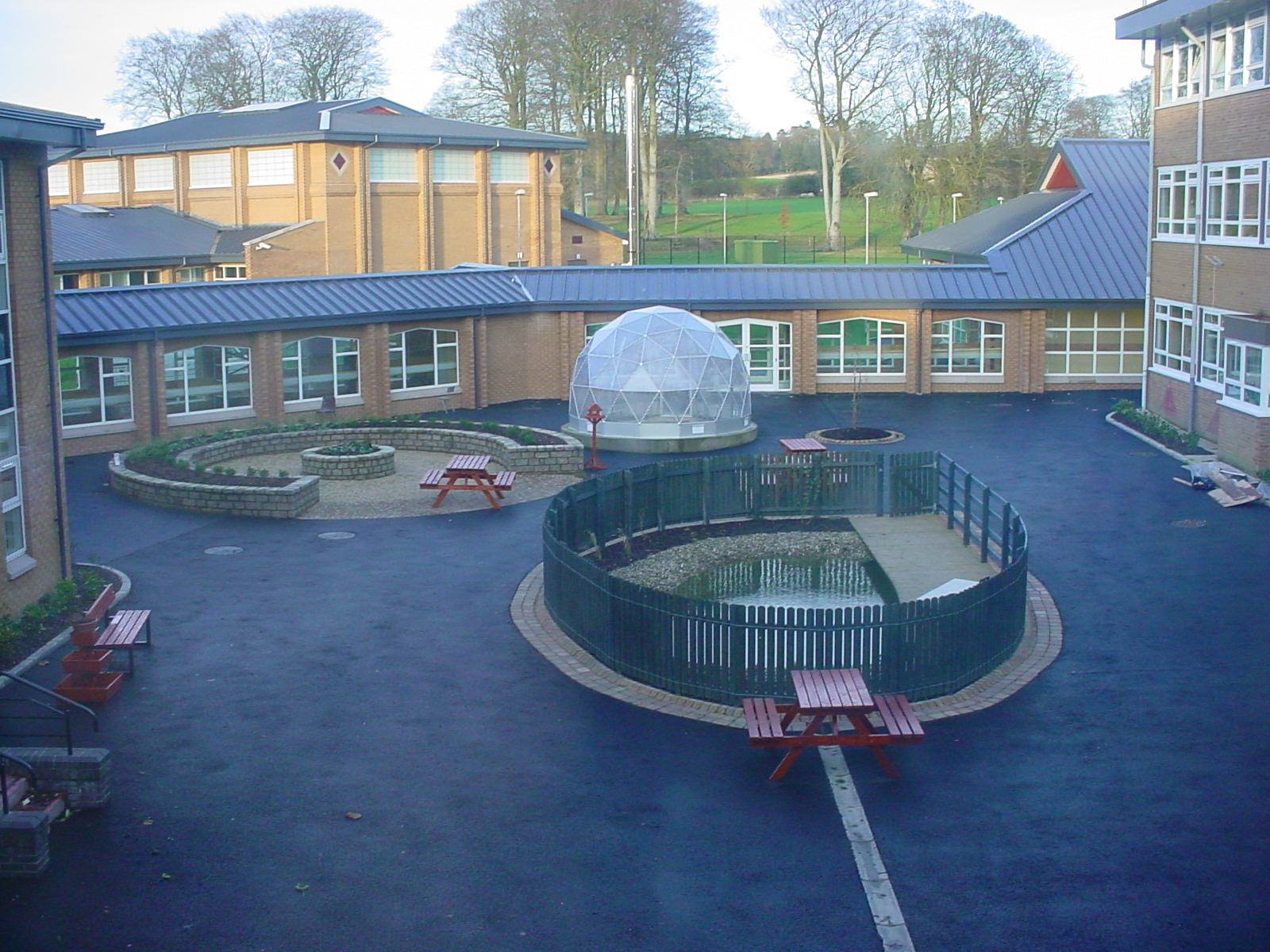
Antrim Grammar School's quad area with the Sports Centre in the background

In September 2001, after several years of planning and preparation, a £7.5 million refurbishment and rebuilding programme commenced at Antrim Grammar School. The programme was completed in January 2004. There were several phases to the work undertaken by the NEELB, McCombe Brothers, Samuel Stevenson & Sons; and Williams & Shaw. After completion, every department now has access to Interactive whiteboards and Information Technology cluster areas.

The school now has a new multi-purpose Learning Resource Centre, with its computing and library facilities. The school also received a new lecture theatre.

In 2015, Parkhall College commenced construction on their new building and facilities. Mainly completed in 2018, this included new pitches and a new entrance to the schools. This affected Antrim Grammar and has made traffic in the school more organised, as well as providing a new car park for teachers and pupils. Antrim Grammar also shares joint access to some of the pitches. However, over the 2019/20 academic year, Antrim Grammar and Parkhall have two new multi-purpose pitches, situated on the site of the old Parkhall school.

In January 2021, Antrim Grammar confirmed the completion of three new modular classrooms which were built to accommodate the increased demand for places at the school. Other refurbishments completed were the renovation of the ICT suite.

== Sports ==
In July 2024, Antrim Grammar School's rugby team embarked on a two-week tour of South Africa led by staff and attended by notable players such as Jack McNeilly, Eoin Byrne, Jake Quigley, Adomas Blazauskas, Liam McMullan, and Noah Smyth. A highlight of the tour was the 1st XV’s thrilling 10-7 victory, with an undefeated record of three wins out of three matches. Jamie Orr, director of rugby at Antrim Grammar School said “Getting the opportunity to play in the backyard of the Rugby World Champions will be an invaluable experience for our players,”.

The 1st XV of Antrim Grammar School then progressed to win the Danske Bank Schools' Trophy on March 6, 2025, the teams first 1st XV trophy since being established in 1974.

== Notable alumni ==
- Mark Allen, professional snooker player, world rank no.1.
- Joely Andrews, member of the Northern Ireland Women's National Football Team.
- Wayne Boyd, winner of the European Le Mans series title in Portugal.
- Michael Lennox, director of Channel 4 critically acclaimed comedy, Derry Girls.
- Ricky Whittle, English actor known for Hollyoaks and American Gods.
