= Down High School =

Coordinates: 54.34268°N 5.71064°E

Location
- Strangford Road; Downpatrick, County Down, BT30 6SL; Northern Ireland

Information
- Type: Controlled Grammar school
- Motto: Nothing achieved without effort Floreat Dunum (May Down flourish)
- Established: 1933; 93 years ago
- Status: Open
- Local authority: Education Authority
- Principal: Mrs M. Perry
- Teaching staff: 84
- Age: 11 to 18
- Enrollment: 953 (2024/25)
- Capacity: 934
- Houses: Down; Lecale; Rathkeltair; Mourne; Strangford
- Colour
- Nickname: DHS; Green High; Down High
- Alumni: Old Dunamians
- Website: http://www.downhighschool.org.uk

Down High School is a controlled co-educational grammar school located in Downpatrick, County Down, Northern Ireland. The school has students from the ages of eleven to eighteen in the senior school; there are 953 students (2024/25).

On 21 July 2014, John O'Dowd, the education minister, approved a development proposal to close the preparatory department of Down High School and it closed on 30 June 2014. There are roughly 250 pupils studying A-levels in the sixth form. In July 2015, some £20 million was granted by the education minister to begin the new build project in 2017.

== History ==
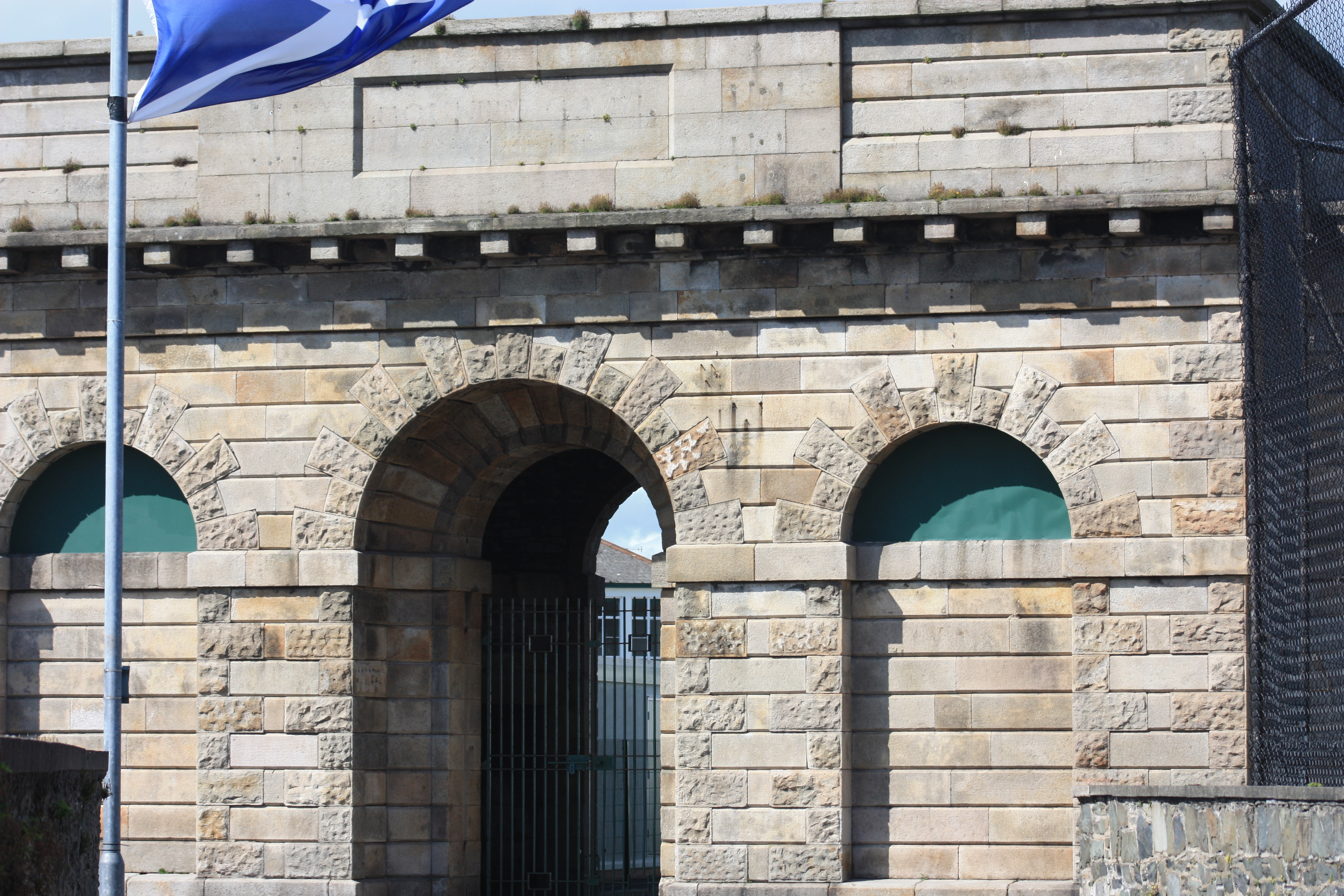
Down High School gate house

The gate house and stone walls surrounding the school were originally part of the county gaol. The stone walls were lowered to the deck when the school was established. It was argued that removing the walls completely would allow fog from the nearby River Quoile to rise into school grounds. There were tunnels, now sealed off, beneath the school and grounds which were used to transport prisoners to and from the court house on English Street. Convicts sentenced to death would often be hanged in the main gateway in front of the school. The large granite gatehouse is a prominent feature of the Mount Crescent area and is unused. Many of the classes are taught in temporary classrooms.

Down High School left the Mount Crescent campus in 2025 after 92 years, moving to a purpose‑built £44 million facility on the Strangford Road.

== School crest ==
The school's crest, designed by the late RWH Blackhood of Loughinisland near Downpatrick, is a reminder of another link with the past, dating back to the 12th century. The design itself is based upon the supposed badge of John De Courcy, the Norman soldier who captured Downpatrick in 1177 and established himself as the ruler of the north east of Ireland. The colours of the crest are taken from the arms of the Anglo-Irish aristocrat, Elizabeth Cromwell (1674–1709), the daughter of the 4th Earl of Ardglass, and owner of the Downpatrick estate. Lady Elizabeth was wife of the Rt Hon Edward Southwell, MP for Kinsale, and principal secretary of state for Ireland in the reigns of William III and Anne. Southwell was a well known benefactor of the town.

The school's motto, Floreat Dunum, Absque Labore Nihil, means "May Down Flourish, nothing is achieved without effort". Floreat Dunum appears on the blazer badge of the school. Previous pupils are known as "Old Dunumians".

== Notable alumni ==
- The members of the band Ash
- Ashleigh Baxter, Irish women's rugby player
- Brittany Hogan, Irish rugby international
- Dermot Nesbitt, Northern Irish Minister for the Environment and MLA for South Down from 1998 to 2007
- Denise McBride, joint-first female judge of the High Court of Northern Ireland
- Alister McGrath, Professor of Historical Theology at the University of Oxford and co-author of The Dawkins Delusion?
- Jim Patterson, first-class cricketer
- The 28th Lord de Ros, Northern Irish aristocrat
- Gareth Russell, historian and bestselling author
- Tommy Seymour, rugby player - Glasgow Warriors winger, 36 caps for Scotland scoring 16 tries, British and Irish Lion touring New Zealand in 2017
