= Lurgan College =

Location
- College Walk; Craigavon, County Armagh, BT66 6JW; Northern Ireland
- Coordinates: 54°28′19″N 6°20′53″W

Information
- Type: Selective Grammar school
- Motto: Meliora Sequor (To Follow Better Things)
- Religious affiliation: non-denominational
- Established: 1873
- Founder: Samuel Watts
- Headmaster: Kyle McCallan
- Staff: 45
- Gender: Co-educational
- Age: 14 to 19: Boulger; Cowan; Harper; Kirkpatrick
- Enrolment: 487
Colours
Navy, red, white
- Board of Governors: 16 members
- School Board: Southern Education and Library Board
- Website: www.lurgancollege.co.uk

Lurgan College is a selective, non-denominational, co-educational 14-19 Grammar School, situated in the town of Lurgan, County Armagh, Northern Ireland.

== History ==
In lieu of the establishment of Lurgan Model primary school in 1863, the town of Lurgan required a secondary education school which met the educational needs of the growing industrial town. The owner of a local brewery, Samuel Watts, set out plans for an endowment fund in his will for the formation of a middle class, secondary school which provided education to boys in Agriculture, Classics and English. After Watts’s death in February 1850, a Trustee Committee was formed to ensure the £9000 in Watts’s will would contribute towards creating a new school. However, it was not until December 1872 that the Trustee Committee had gathered enough funds to commence construction of the school.

The school was established at a residence on Market Hill, Lurgan in March 1873. The first headmaster was E. V. Boulger of Dublin. The construction of the school buildings in the township of Brownlowsderry was completed in August 1873 and the school accepted its first cohort of students in October of the same year.

Boulger was a Classical scholar and uncomfortable among small boys, and left in 1875, to be replaced by William T. Kirkpatrick of the Royal Belfast Academical Institution. Kirkpatrick oversaw the student population grow numerically and was responsible for the growth in academics at the college. Kirkpatrick retired in 1899 and James Cowan of Manchester Grammar School assumed principality of the college. Cowan was responsible for the introduction of Science education in the college in 1905 and the further integration of female student admission in 1918. Cowan retired in 1922 having failed to rectify the school's dwindling numbers with under 30 pupils enrolled when he retired.

In 1968, it became 'a selective, non-denominational, co-educational 14-19 Grammar School, offering a predominantly academic education up to Advanced Level in a wide range of subjects.'

== Present Day ==
The school continues to rank within the top 20 Northern Irish secondary level schools in the Sunday Times Parent Power Survey.

The school has received the necessary funding to proceed with plans to erect a new building, replacing all of the current accommodation except for the listed 1873 portion. Work was to commence in March 2009, but this still has not happened due to departmental cuts.

== Notable former pupils ==
- Jocelyn Bell Burnell, (born as Susan Jocelyn Bell, 15 July 1943) astrophysicist, attended Lurgan College Preparatory Department from 1948 to 1956 and returned to Lurgan College in 2007 while filming the BBC bio-doc 'Northern Star' and then again later that same year as the guest of honour at the school's speech day and prize-giving ceremony.
- Robert Wilkinson "Paddy" Turkington DSO DFC & Bar (1920-1945), World War Two Royal Air Force flying ace, attended the school from 1933 to 1939.

== Headmasters ==
- Mr. E. M. Boulger (1873-1875)
- Mr. W. T. Kirkpatrick (1875-1899)
- Mr. J. Cowan (1899-1922)
- Mr. V. M. Harper (1922-1952)
- Mr. J. Trewsdale (1952-1978)
- Mr. N. Eccles, MBE (1978-1988)
- Mr. W. D. Johnston (1988-2005)
- Mr. T. Robinson, OBE (2005-2022)
- Mr. K. McCallan, MBE (2022-present)

== Sports ==
=== Girls' hockey ===
The 1st XI girls hockey team have had notable success in the past number of years. In 2003 they won the Ulster Girls Senior Schools Cup and went on to win the Kate Russell All Irelands in 2003. They repeated this success three times more in 2011, 2013 and 2014. They have been in the final of the Ulster Girls Senior Schools Cup in 2010, 2011, 2012, 2013 and 2014.

The 2nd XI have also had great success. They reached the final of the McDowell Cup in 2012 and won this trophy in 2013.
