= Rainey Endowed School =

Coordinates: 54.757°N 6.612°W

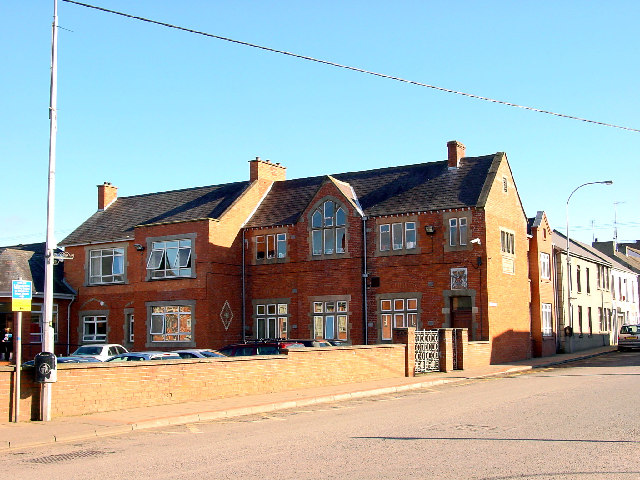

Location
- 79 Rainey Street; Magherafelt, County Londonderry, BT45 5DB; Northern Ireland

Information
- Type: Voluntary grammar school
- Motto: Sal Sapit Omnia (Salt Savours All)
- Established: 1713; 313 years ago
- Founder: Hugh Rainey
- Headmaster: Mark McCullough
- Gender: Mixed
- Age: 11 to 18
- Enrolment: 700
- Colours: Black and red
- Website: https://www.raineyendowed.com

Rainey Endowed School, known colloquially as "The Rainey", is a voluntary grammar school in Magherafelt, County Londonderry, Northern Ireland. The school was founded in 1713 and has an enrolment of around 700 pupils. Each year group has a total of about 100 students. The school borders three counties and draws its students from County Londonderry, County Antrim and County Tyrone. It offers the Northern Ireland curricula up to the age of 16 and a range of AS and A2 courses at post 16. It is also a member of a local inter-school program which shares its A-level classes with other schools in the area.

== History ==
=== Establishment ===
Rainey Endowed School was founded by Hugh Rainey, an iron smelter and wealthy merchant in the Magherafelt district. He was an elder in the Presbyterian Congregation of Castledawson, which at that time included Magherafelt. As a result of a vow made to God for his protection and favour, he, by his will dated 11 April 1707, devoted one half of his estate to fund a charity school for 24 boys: "sons of parents who were of good report and reduced to poverty". After three years of instruction, the boys were to be given a suit of clothes and £2.50 for an apprentice fee.

In his will, Hugh Rainey wrote "that what I have left may not only be for a generation or two, but that it may be for many not yet born", and so 'The Rainey' was founded.

=== Development ===
Hugh Rainey died in 1707 and the task of building the school fell to his only child, Elizabeth, and her husband. The school was built in 1713 on land leased from the Salters' Company, and is still on that site today.

In 1863 negotiations with the Salters' Company resulted in the development of a new building. On 21 January 1863 the Lord Chancellor of Ireland, confirmed a new scheme of management. In 1864 the Salters' Company built a teachers' residence and a single schoolroom in Rainey Street Magherafelt. Girls were permitted into the school at the end of the 19th century.

The school motto, taken from the Salters Company, is Sal Sapit Omnia, translated as Salt flavours all.

== Background ==
As of the academic year 2008-2009 pupils on roll were marked at 746 with four classes in each year, taught by 27 female teachers and 22 male teachers. There were more than 20 subjects at Key Stage 4. It was over-subscribed, with 1.7 applications per place.

There is a heavy emphasis on extra-curricular activity, including drama, public-speaking, choirs, orchestras, and Scripture Union. Sport is a dominant feature, especially rugby, hockey, tennis, and athletics. The Under 14 hockey team won the Junior Cup beating Friends School, Lisburn in the final in 2008/09.

The school has a strong musical tradition, with choirs, orchestras, traditional Irish musical groups, and encouragement of solo performance; as well as drama productions. More than 100 pupils take part in the Duke of Edinburgh Award scheme: 25 raised £35,000 for Gold Expedition in Kenya, with half of the money given to a charitable organisation that funds primary education in Nairobi. There has been a recent emphasis by the sixth form on charity fundraising: large amounts have been raised for tsunami appeal, Leukaemia Research, and Cystic Fibrosis Trust.

Plans were announced in April 2004 for a new £14.3 million school to be built.

The school ranks in the top 5 in Northern Ireland for GCSE and A-Level results each year.

In 2009 the school successfully applied to become a specialist maths college.

The Sunday Times Parent Power selected the school to be the Secondary School of the year 2016 for Northern Ireland.

In 2020 The NI Sunday Times selected the Rainey as its school of the decade.

== Notable Old Raineyites ==
- Joseph Burns, Unionist politician
- Erwin Gabathuler, nuclear physicist
- Robin Bailie, solicitor and politician
- Richard Ferguson (barrister), barrister and politician
- Wendy Houvenaghel (née McClean), Olympic cyclist and former Royal Air Force dentist
- Ian McCrea, Democratic Unionist Party MLA
- Patsy McGlone, Social Democratic and Labour Party MLA
- Philip Maini, Professor of Mathematical Biology at the University of Oxford
- Derrick Crothers, mathematician, physicist and politician
- Laura Pyper, actress
- The founding members of indie band General Fiasco
- Jonathan Anderson, fashion designer
- Michael Glancy, rugby union player
- TJ Anderson (rugby union), rugby union player
- Patrick McFlynn, the 26th president of the Gaelic Athletic Association
- JC Stewart, singer and songwriter
- Frank McGuigan, senior inter-county Gaelic footballer for Tyrone and 1984 All Star
- John Brennan, senior inter-county Gaelic footballer, and later manager, for Derry
- Adrian McGuckin, senior inter-county Gaelic footballer, and later manager, for Derry
