= Christopher Hill =

Christopher or Chris Hill may refer to:

== Academia ==
- Christopher Hill (historian) (1912–2003), English Marxist historian
- Christopher S. Hill (born 1942), American philosopher
- Christopher Hill (political scientist) (born 1948), British international relations scholar
- Christopher T. Hill (born 1951), American theoretical physicist
- Chris Hill (physicist), American particle physicist

== Sports ==
- Chris Hill (athletic director) (born c. 1950), American athletic director at the University of Utah
- Chris Hill (tennis) (born 1957), Welsh tennis player and coach
- Chris Hill (basketball) (born 1983), American basketball player
- Chris Hill (point guard) (born 1983), American basketball player
- Chris Hill (rugby league) (born 1987), English rugby league player

== Other people ==
- Christopher Hill (Royal Navy officer) (c. 1716–1778), British admiral
- Christopher Hill (bishop) (born 1945), English Anglican bishop
- Chris Hill (DJ) (1945–2025), British DJ
- Chris Hill (photographer) (born 1946), photographer from Northern Ireland
- Christopher R. Hill (born 1952), American diplomat
- Chris Hill (businessman) (born 1971), British businessman
- Christopher William Hill, British playwright and children's novelist

== Places ==
- Chris Hill, a mountain in Roosevelt County, Montana
