= Abertillery =

Town in Wales

Abertillery: Welsh: Abertyleri
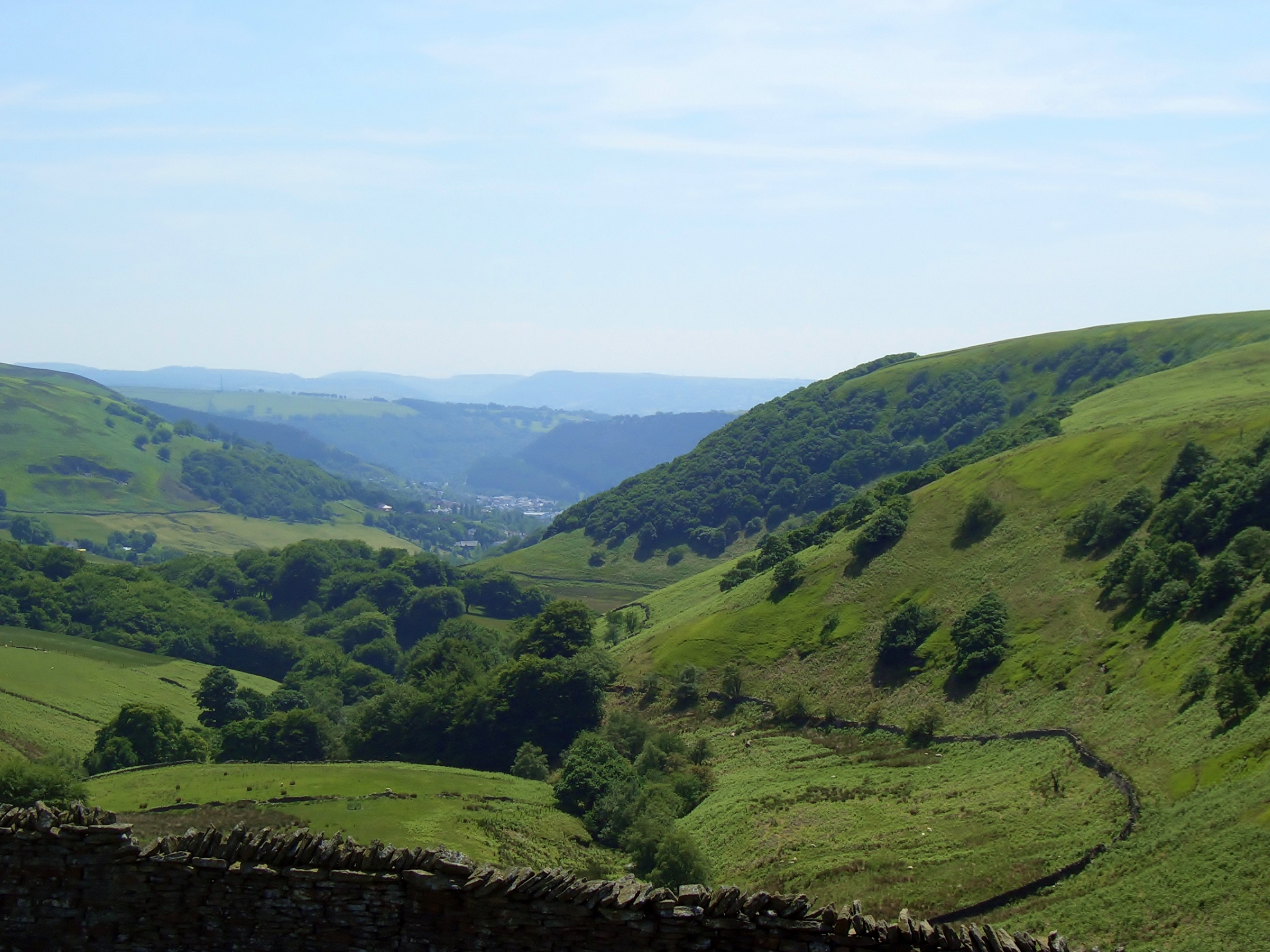
- The view towards Abertillery from the head of the Tyleri

- Location within Blaenau Gwent
- Population: 11,601 (2011 census)
- OS grid reference: SO215045
- Principal area: Blaenau Gwent
- Preserved county: Gwent
- Country: Wales
- Sovereign state: United Kingdom
- Post town: ABERTILLERY
- Postcode district: NP13
- Dialling code: 01495
- Police: Gwent
- Fire: South Wales
- Ambulance: Welsh
- UK Parliament: Blaenau Gwent and Rhymney
- Senedd Cymru – Welsh Parliament: Blaenau Gwent
- List of places UK Wales Blaenau Gwent 51.73°N 3.13°W Map of the community

Abertillery (/ˌæbərtɪˈlɛəri/; Welsh: Abertyleri) is a town and community in Blaenau Gwent County Borough, Wales. It is located in the Ebbw Fach valley, and the historic county of Monmouthshire.

The surrounding landscape borders the Brecon Beacons National Park and the Blaenavon World heritage Site. Formerly a major coal mining centre the Abertillery area was transformed in the 1990s using EU and other funding to return to a greener environment.

Situated on the A467 the town is 15 miles (24 km) north of the M4 and 5 miles (8 km) south of the A465 "Heads of the Valleys" trunk road. It is about 25 miles (40 km) by road from Cardiff and 47 miles (76 km) from Bristol.

According to the 2011 Census, 4.8% of the ward's 4,416 (212 residents) resident-population can speak, read, and write Welsh. This is below the county's figure of 5.5% of 67,348 (3,705 residents) who can speak, read, and write Welsh.

== Etymology ==
The name of the community means "the mouth of the River Tyleri", which flows into the town. The name Tyleri is probably derived from a personal name.

== Town centre ==
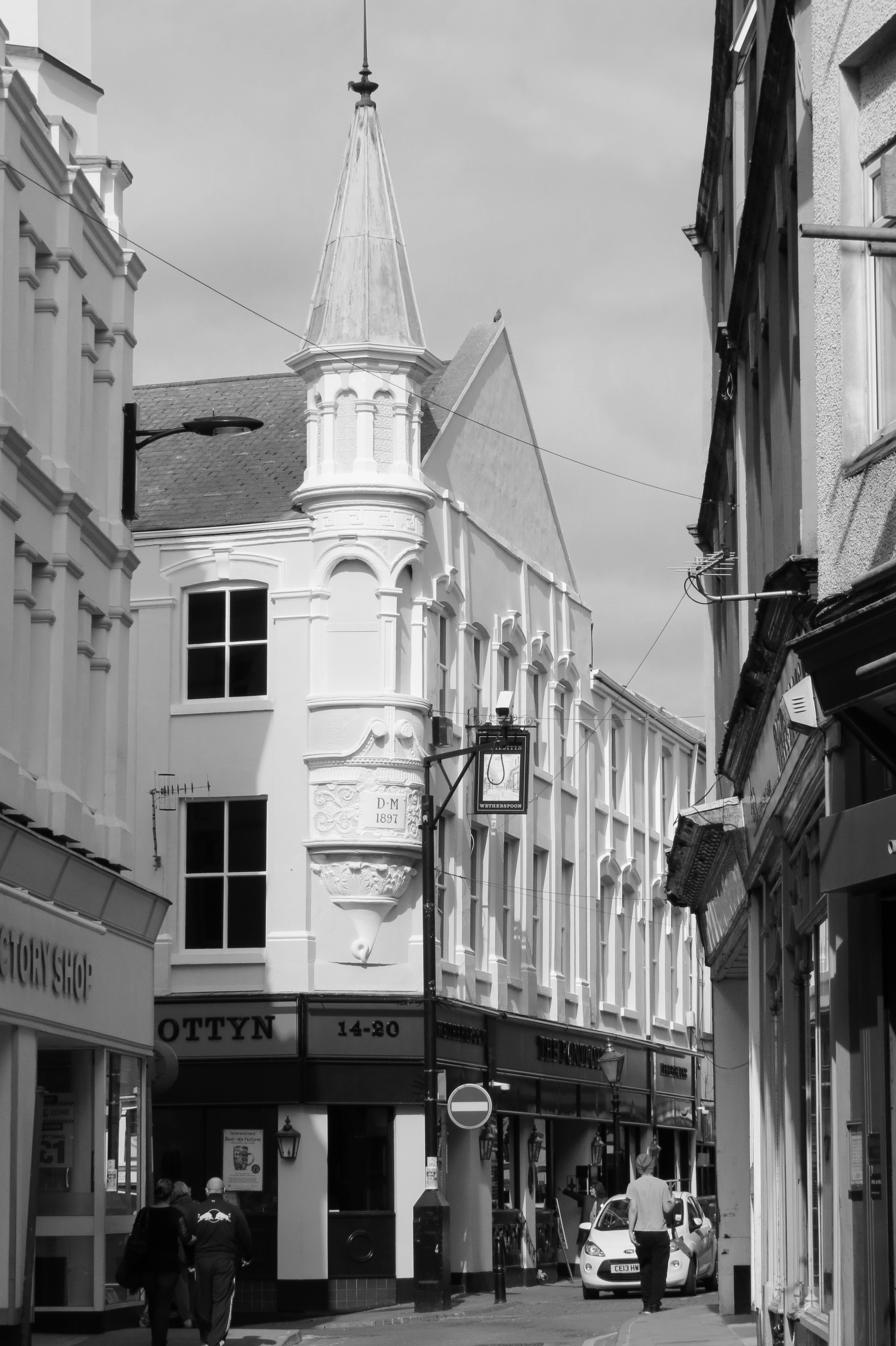
Former "Pontlottyn" department store

Abertillery's traditional-style town centre mainly developed in the late 19th century and as such has some interesting Victorian architecture. Spread over 4 main streets the town in its heyday had two department stores and a covered Victorian arcade linking two of the main shopping areas. These were all included in a Blaenau Gwent Borough Council remodelling and modernisation project using European Union funding in a £13 million programme spread over a 5-year period ending in 2015.

The project included a new multi-storey car park, a revamp of public areas and the town's Metropole Theatre. This building provides production, exhibition, conference and meeting facilities as well as housing Abertillery museum. In March 2014 Prince Edward, Earl of Wessex, officiated at the launch of Jubilee Square, a public facility in the town centre next to St Michael's Church.

== Coal mining ==
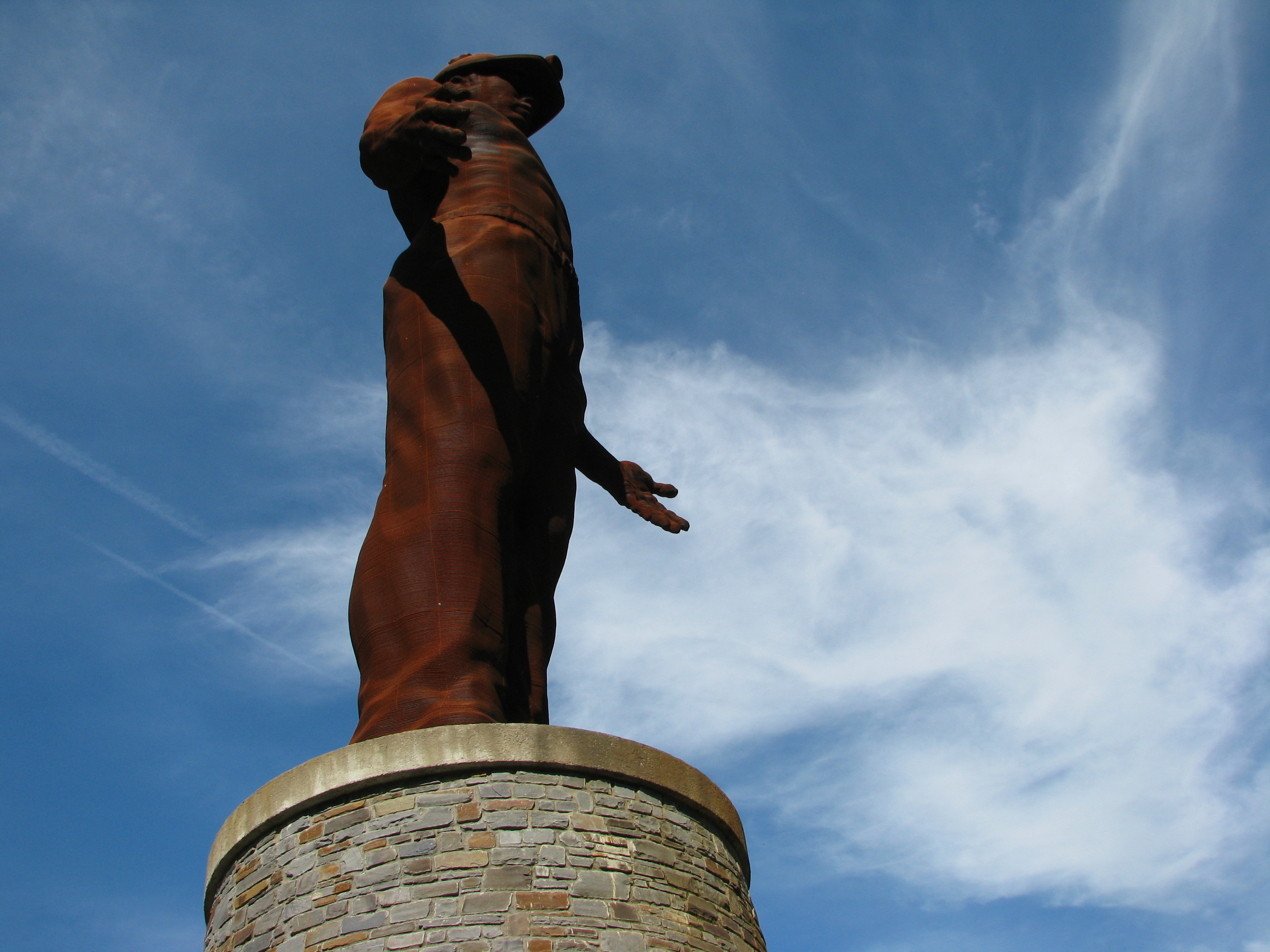
Guardian memorial at Parc Arael Griffin Six Bells.

Major industry came to the area in 1843 when the locality's first deep coal mine was sunk at Tir Nicholas Farm, Cwmtillery. The town developed rapidly thereafter and played a major part in the South Wales coalfield. Its population rose steeply, being 10,846 in the 1891 census and 21,945 ten years later. The population peaked just short of 40,000 around the beginning of the 1930s. Eventually there were six deep coal mines, numerous small coal levels, a tin works, brick works, iron foundry and light engineering businesses in the area. Just one of the coal mines, Cwmtillery, produced over 32 million tons of coal in its lifetime and at its height employed 2760 men and boys.

In 1960 an underground explosion at Six Bells Colliery resulted in the loss of life of 45 local miners. Fifty years later the Archbishop of Canterbury Rowan Williams officiated at the launch of the Guardian mining memorial. This artistically acclaimed monument standing at 20m tall overlooks Parc Arael Griffin, the now reclaimed and landscaped former colliery site. The adjoining Ty Ebbw Fach visitor centre provides conference facilities, a restaurant and a "mining valley" experience room. Not long after the disaster the renowned artist L. S. Lowry visited the area and recorded the scene. The resultant landscape painting now hangs in National Museum Cardiff.

The coal mines remained the predominant economic emphasis until the general run down of the industry in the 1980s.

== Abertillery Conurbation ==
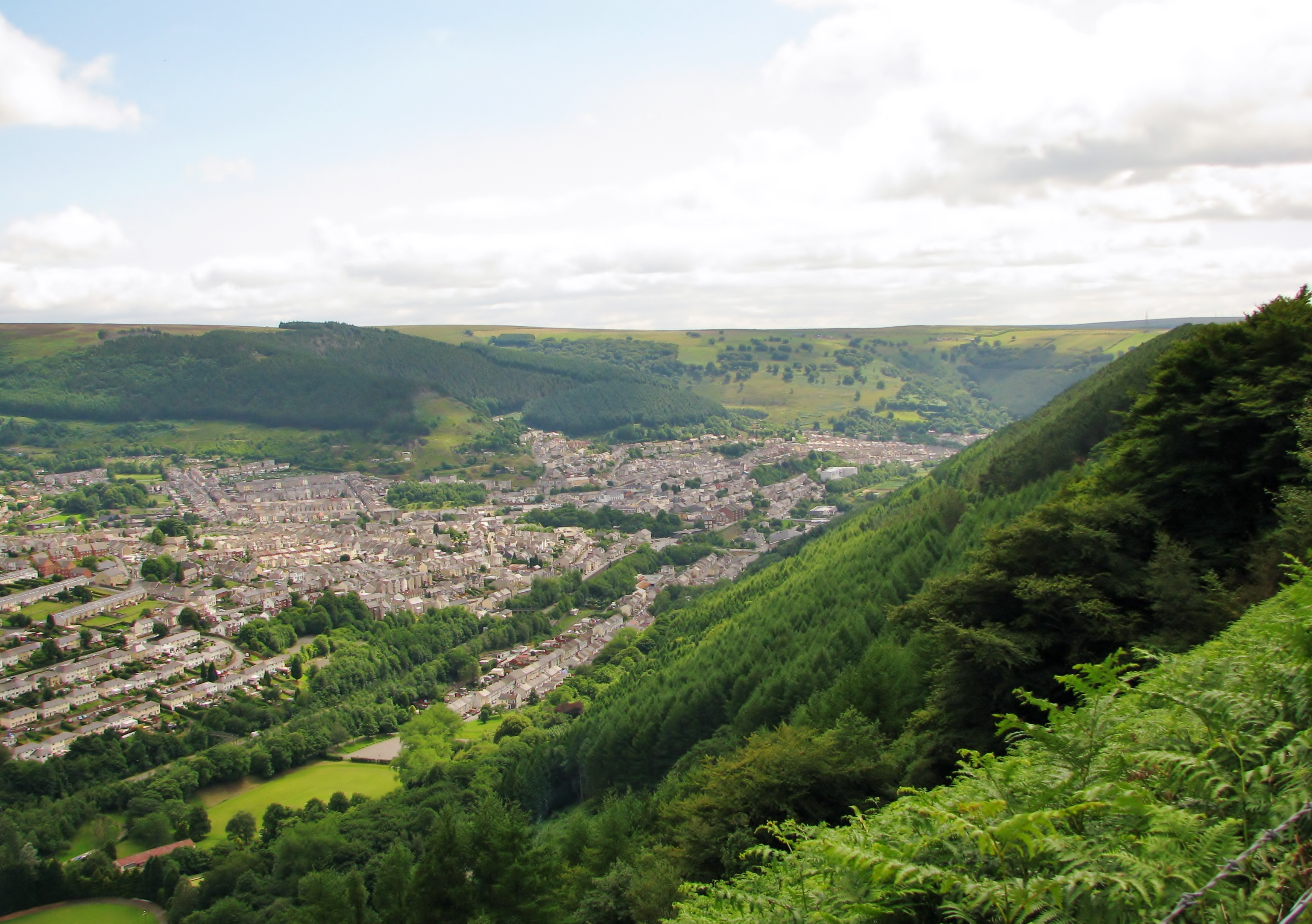
The western outskirts of Abertillery as seen from the hillside above "The Park".

Away from the town centre, the often steep-sided nature of the landscape imposes its own demands on development. Although this may appear limiting, it has helped provide the almost amphitheatre-like nature of Abertillery Park, often described as one of the most attractive rugby grounds in world rugby.

The street plan and housing stock flow uninterrupted from Cwmtillery in the north to Six Bells in the south, forming the town that is Abertillery. Prior to 1974 local government was provided by Abertillery Urban District Council (AUDC). Its area included the small neighbouring villages of Aberbeeg, Llanhilleth and Brynithel. Historical data relating to Abertillery occasionally refers to this AUDC area meaning that it can be difficult to compare like with like. For example, the 2014 population for the wider conurbation area is around 20,000 rather than the 11,000 often quoted for Abertillery itself.

Whilst in the main the area has an older housing stock there are several developments of modern, often large homes, generally found on the outskirts of the town with views out over the surrounding area. These apart, terraced council tax band A and B properties predominate, meaning that average house prices are among the most affordable in the UK.

== Local history ==
=== Early history ===
There are very few written historical records relating to the area before the town developed in the middle of the 19th century. Nevertheless, there are facts that you can use to outline important events.

- Abertillery museum has locally discovered artefacts dating as far back as the Bronze Age.
- St Illtyd's Church overlooking the town dates to the 13th century – probably with 6th century origins.
- St Illtyd's Motte lies just to the south west of the church. A Norman castle mound, it was probably destroyed in 1233.
- The ruins of two more recent, probably 14th century, castles lie on private land to the northeast of St Illtyd's Church.
- There are several ruined mediaeval farmhouses in the Abertillery area.
- The Local Blaenau Gwent Baptist church can trace its roots back to Tŷ Nest Llewellyn, a ruined 17th-century dwelling place often used by non-conformists to escape from the religious persecution of the times.

Before the coming of major industry, Abertillery was little more than an area of scattered farms in the ancient parish of Aberystruth. In 1779 the parish minister Edmund Jones described the area thus: "The valley of Tyleri ... is the most delightful. The trees ... especially the beech trees, abounding about rivers great and small, the hedges and lanes make these places exceeding pleasant and the passing by them delightful and affecting ... in these warm valleys, with the prospect of the grand high mountains about them would make very delightful habitations." In 1799 clergyman and historian Archdeacon William Coxe toured the area and in writing a diary of his travels described it as "... richly wooded, and highly cultivated...we looked down with delight upon numerous valleys ... with romantic scenery". The entire population of Aberystruth parish at the turn of the 19th century was just a little over 800. It is not known what the population of Abertillery was at the time but it was probably in the very low hundreds, all of whom would have spoken Welsh only.

=== From the mid-nineteenth century ===
==== Industrialisation ====
The area's first deep coal mine was sunk in 1843.

===== Collieries in Abertillery =====
- Six Bells Colliery

==== Abertillery Institute ====
The first reading rooms were set up in Abertillery in 1856. However, when Thomas Powell took over the Tillery Colliery in 1882 he made a commitment to establish educational facilities for his workers.

==== Local government ====
Formed in 1877, Abertillery Urban District Council incorporated the adjoining smaller communities of Six Bells, Cwmtillery, Brynithel, Aberbeeg and Llanhilleth. The population of this conurbation climbed to almost 40,000 in 1931 making it the second largest town in Monmouthshire. The council was abolished in 1974 as part of major UK wide local government reorganisation.

== Transport ==
The reopening of Abertillery railway station has been identified as a future development of the Ebbw Valley Railway.

== Education ==
Abertillery Learning Community provides all-through education for the town and neighbouring areas. Until the 1970s the town had its own local authority-run Grammar school providing education up to the age of eighteen. Tertiary education is now provided by Coleg Gwent at Ebbw Vale – opened in 2013.

== Industry ==
There are several small and medium-sized business parks in the area offering a range of business premises. In 2014 the largest employer was Tyleri Valley Foods, which closed in 2023. Many local people commute outside the area to work.

== Sport, leisure and tourism ==
Abertillery Town cricket club and Abertillery Blaenau Gwent RFC formed in the 1880s. Both have their playing headquarters at "the Park" one of the most picturesque sporting complexes in the UK.

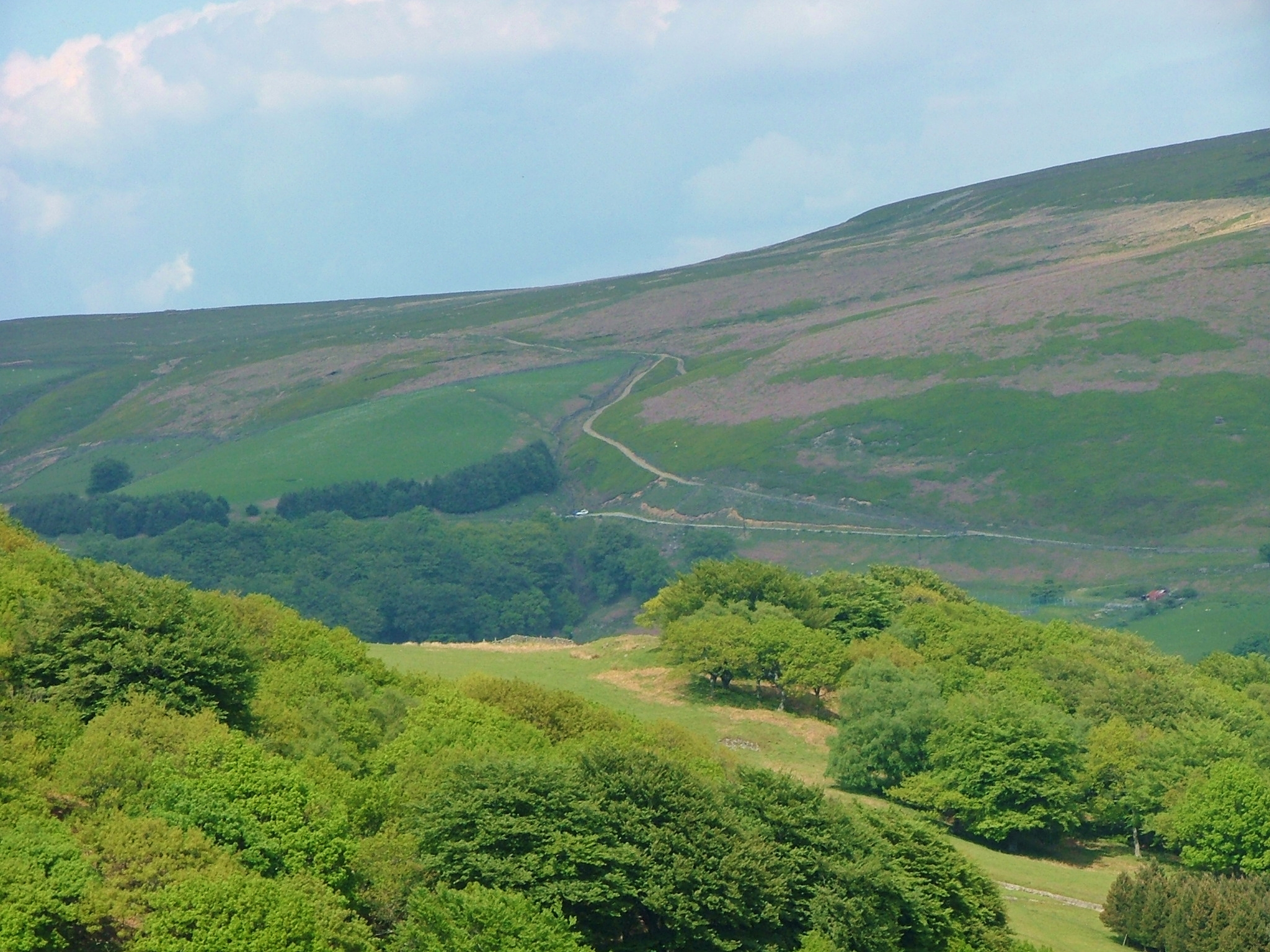
Walking country. Climb to over 550m on one of many routes in the Tyleri valley

The town supports two local Saturday football teams: Abertillery Bluebirds and Abertillery Excelsiors. There are numerous other sports activities running on an organized basis such as bowls, badminton, squash etc.

The surrounding landscape provides hill walking opportunities and walker led groups are thriving in the area. One example is Ebbw Fach Trekkers walking group.

The local museum has displays showing what life was like in the area in its heyday. It also has its own "valleys" Italian café complete with original furnishings.

The Metropole theatre holds musical and drama events – from Blues to amateur dramatics and dance.

The 20-metre-tall (66 ft) Guardian memorial is a destination for visitors to South Wales and amateur photographers. The visitor centre Tŷ Ebbw Fach stands nearby and provides cafe and visitor "mining valley" experience facilities.

== Notable people ==
See also Category:People from Abertillery.

Local people of note in the fields of civil engineering, sport, science, medicine, religion and art:

- Beatrice Green, labour activist and orator
- Chris Hill, professional tennis player
- Harold Jones (murderer), the 15-year old killer committed 2 murders in 1921.
- Jack Shore (MMA fighter), competes in the UFC
- Thora Silverthorne, leading activist within the Communist Party of Great Britain, veteran of the Spanish Civil War, founder of the Association of Nurses, and former president of the Socialist Medical Association
- Jake Blackmore, international rugby forward who played rugby union for Abertillery and represented his country in the rugby union and in the rugby league.

== International relations ==
Abertillery is twinned with Royat in France.

== See also ==
- Aber and Inver as place-name elements
- Abertillery and District Hospital
