= Rathmore Grammar School =

Catholic school in Belfast, Northern Ireland

Coordinates: 54.550°N 5.992°W

Rathmore Grammar School, Belfast
- Kingsway, Belfast, County Antrim, Northern Ireland

Information
- Type: Voluntary Grammar
- Motto: Ut Vitam Habeant (That they may have life)
- Religious affiliation: Roman Catholic
- Founded: 1953
- Local authority: Education Authority (Belfast)
- Principal: Arthur Donnelly
- Gender: Co-educational
- Age: 11 to 19
- Enrollment: 1269
- Colours: Blue, gold and white
- Sports: Badminton, Basketball, Cross country running, Gaelic football, golf, hurling, netball, orienteering, skiing, soccer, swimming, tennis
- Publication: Solas
- Alumni: Old Rathmorians
- School years: Year 8 - Year 14
- Website: rathmoregrammarschool.org

Rathmore Grammar School, normally referred to simply as "Rathmore", is a Catholic grammar school in Finaghy, Belfast, Northern Ireland. The current and second lay principal of the school is Arthur Donnelly, who succeeded Thérèse Hamilton as principal at the beginning of the academic year 2021/22. Rathmore is one of the highest-performing and most competitive schools in Northern Ireland. Rathmore was listed as the top Northern Ireland School 2026 by the Times.

The school is situated in extensive grounds behind the St. Anne's "campus", consisting of St. Anne's Primary School, Parish Church, and Parish Centre.

Rathmore Grammar School is paired with the Nicolaus-Cusanus-Gymnasium in Bonn, Germany and Colegio de San Jose in Madrid, Spain.

== History ==
The courtyard, the central part of the school. The drama/lecture theatre is situated here, it is a separate building, and can be seen in the background.

Rathmore Grammar School began as a stately home, Rathmore House, built in 1874 by Belfast businessman Victor Coates for his family, but the house was passed to the local Bishop who in turn sold it to the Religious of the Sacred Heart of Mary. The RSHM used the house as a convent, where they began a school for girls. The school became coeducational in 1973.

A new school building was designed by a past pupil of the school. The new building was completed in time for the school year beginning September 2005. This project included the restoration of the convent, which now houses History, Politics and Religious Education.

== Academics ==
In 2014, Rathmore was awarded the Sunday Times School of the Year award. It was the first year that the school had entered the competition. Similarly in 2016, it was the top-performing school in Northern Ireland in terms of GCSE and A-Level results, thus placing 38th in the UK. In 2018, the school placed 41st in the UK.

In 2019 the school was ranked 10th out of 159 secondary schools in Northern Ireland with 89.0% of its A-level students who sat the exams in 2017/18 being awarded three A*-C grades.

In 2018 it was ranked 20th in Northern Ireland for its GCSE performance with 98.3% of its entrants receiving five or more GCSEs at grades A* to C, including the core subjects English and Maths.

In 2026, Rathmore was named the Top Northern Ireland School for 2026 by the Times on Sunday

== Sport ==
Rathmore has a history in Gaelic games, winning the All-Ireland senior C title in 2006/7. Within Ulster, Rathmore has competed in the McLarnon Cup in Gaelic football and the Casement Cup in hurling, winning both in 2008 and 2012 respectively. In 2010, Rathmore 4th years won the Leopold Cup in hurling, defeating Belfast neighbors St. Malachy's in the final. They have also tasted success in basketball with the under-16 boys winning the Northern Ireland Cup in 2012 and finishing 2nd place the previous year. Within football, Rathmore 4th years won the Lisburn Cup, the League and the Belfast Cup in 2016.

== Notable Events ==
In September 2007, Rathmore closed its Amnesty International branch in response to a change in Amnesty International's policy on abortion.

In April 2010, the school debating team (Conor Heaney and Davin Clarke) won the Northern Ireland Schools Debating Championship, defeating the team from the Royal Belfast Academical Institution in the final at Stormont. It was the first time a team from the school had reached the final of the competition. They spoke in Opposition to the motion 'This House Would Welcome Being Part of a European Federal State'.

== Notable former teaching staff ==
- Bairbre de Brún, former Sinn Féin MEP
- Davy Hyland, former Sinn Féin MLA
- Máire Hendron, former Alliance Party MLA

== Notable alumni ==
- Vivian Campbell (b. 1962) - member of Def Leppard.
- Mairtín Crawford (1967–2004) - writer.
- Laura Donnelly (b. 1982) - actress
- Michelle Drayne (b. 1988) - Northern Ireland netball international
- Mairéad Farrell (1957–1988) - IRA volunteer killed in Gibraltar in 1988
- Jonathan Harden (b. 1979) - director and actor
- Claire Hanna (b. 1980) - MP for Belfast South.
- Conor Henry (b. 1970) - first Irish man to win the Milk Race
- Damien Johnson (b. 1978) - Footballer
- Frankie Wilson (1970–2022) - Gaelic footballer, association footballer and manager.

== See also ==
- List of secondary schools in Belfast
