= Dawson Stelfox =

Northern Irish architect

James Dawson Stelfox is an architect from Belfast, Northern Ireland. He is the former chairman of Consarc Design Group and in May 2008, he was elected president of the Royal Society of Ulster Architects.

== Education and career ==
He was born in Belfast in 1958, attended Rosetta Primary School, then Royal Belfast Academical Institution, and in 1976 began to study architecture at Queen's University Belfast. His first job was with the conservation architects, Consarc, which after a brief period of self-employment he rejoined in 1995. He became chairman in 2002.

Among the many projects on which he has worked are Parliament Buildings, Stormont; Belfast's Christ Church; the Odyssey Arena; and the Ormeau Gas Works. Several of these projects have been premiated by the Royal Institute of British Architects (RIBA) and the Belfast Civic Trust.

== Mountaineering ==
In 1993 he led the Irish Everest expedition which contained climbers from both jurisdictions on the island, was supported by both Sports Council as well as private companies. When he reached the peak of Everest via the North Ridge on 27 May 1993 he became the first person from Ireland to do so.

He is past president and current board member of Mountaineering Ireland.

Preceded by Trevor Leaker	RSUA President; 2008–2010	Succeeded by Norman Hutchinson
