= Royal Belfast Academical Institution =

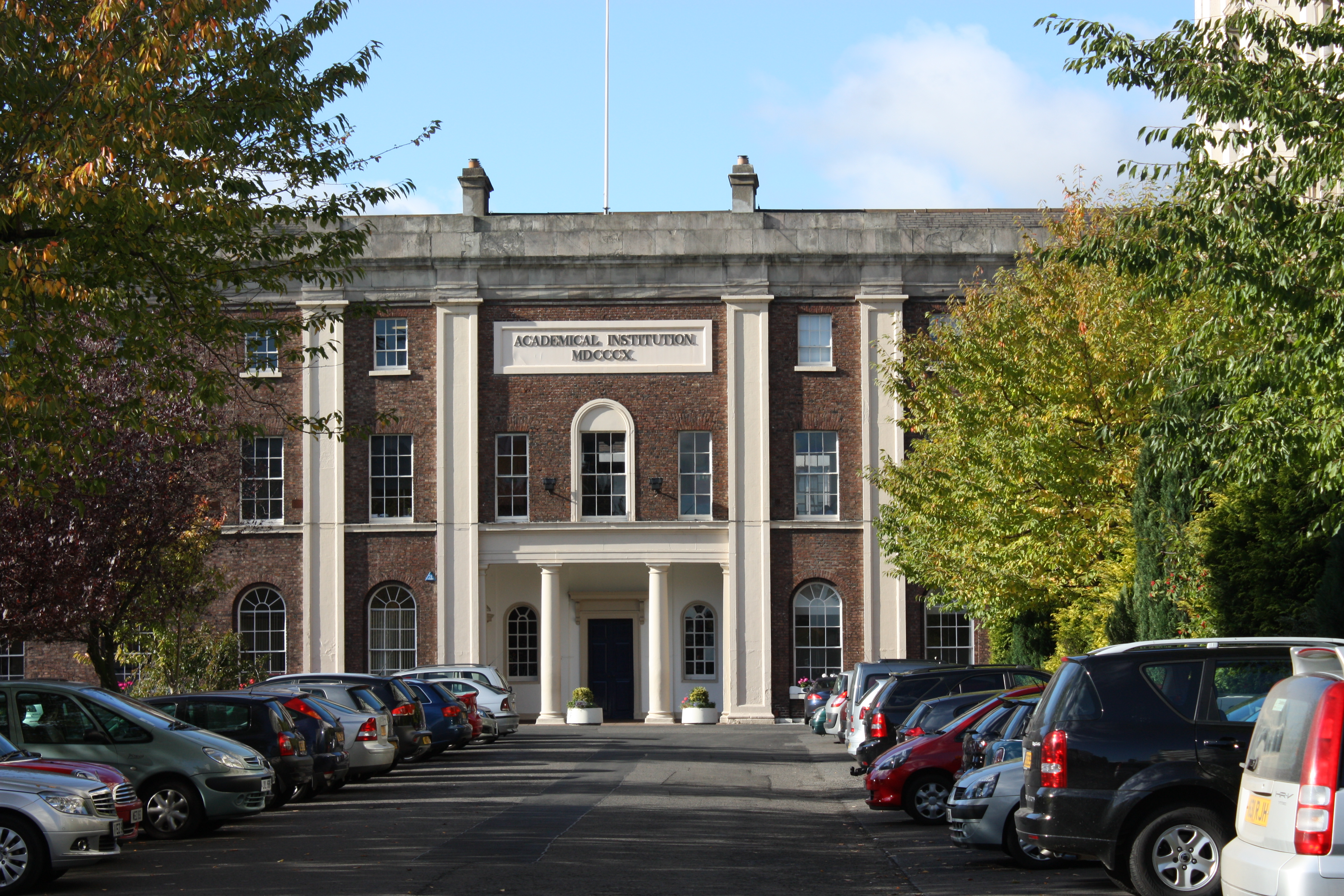

Location
- College Square East; Belfast, Northern Ireland, BT1 6DL; United Kingdom; 54°35′49″N 05°56′11″W

Information
- Other name: Inst
- Type: Voluntary Grammar; Boys Grammar
- Motto: Quaerere Verum (To Seek the Truth)
- Religious affiliation: Non-denominational
- Established: 1810; 216 years ago
- Founder: William Drennan
- Status: Open
- Chairman of the board of governors: Colin Gowdy
- Principal: Dr. Craig Walker
- Gender: Boys
- Age: 11 to 18
- Enrollment: 1063 (2023/24)
- Houses: Dill; Jones; Kelvin; Larmor; Pirrie; Stevenson
- Colour
- Newspaper: Sea Horse
- Yearbook: School News
- School fees: Years 8–12 £1740 (2025); Years 13–14 £1745 (2025); All fees charged per annum
- Affiliations: Inchmarlo Prep.
- Alumni: Old Instonians
- Website: https://rbai.org.uk

The Royal Belfast Academical Institution, known locally as Inst, is an independent grammar school in Belfast, Northern Ireland. With the support of Belfast's leading reformers and democrats, it opened its doors in 1814. Until 1849, when it was superseded by what today is Queen's University, the institution pioneered Belfast's first programme of collegiate education.The modern school educates boys from ages 11 to 18. It is one of the eight Northern Irish schools represented on the Headmasters' and Headmistresses' Conference. The school occupies an 18-acre site in the centre of the city on which its first buildings were erected.

== History ==
=== Dissident foundation ===
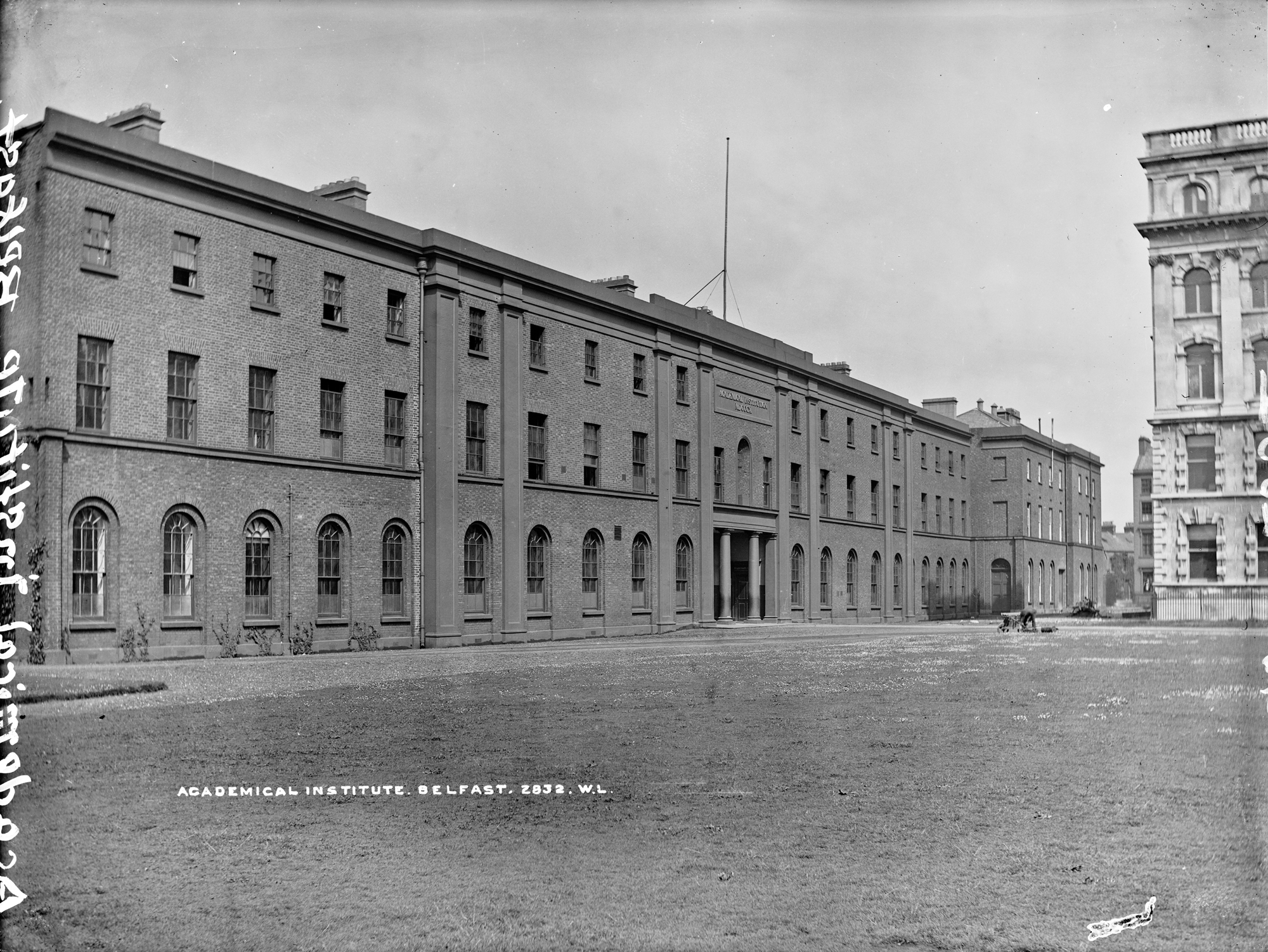
View of the institute, circa 1910

In 1806, writing in the Belfast News Letter, William Bruce dismissed "visionary notions" of new "academical institution". The town, he reminded his readers, already had "an excellent plan of school education for which it is indebted to the Belfast Academy funded in 1786". What was to become "Inst" was not the first vision of William Drennan's to be opposed by Bruce, the principal of the Belfast Academy. In the 1790s, Drennan and his Society of United Irishmen had called for complete and immediate Catholic Emancipation and for a radical and democratic reform of the Irish Parliament.

For Drennan, the new institution was an expression his resolve, in the wake of the 1798 rebellion, to "be content to get the substance of reform more slowly" and with "proper preparation of manners or principles"." He was joined by leading Belfast merchants and professional men. These included the former United Irishmen Robert Simms and Robert Caldwell, who had been among the proprietors of the United Irish paper, Northern Star; the Tennent brothers, William who had been a state prisoner, and Robert, who as a ship's surgeon had been a sympathetic witness to the 1797 Table Bay naval mutiny; and the botanist John Templeton. They seconded Drennan as he persuaded a town meeting in 1807 "to facilitate and render less expensive the means of acquiring education; to give access to the works of literature to the middle and lower classes of society; to make provision for the instruction of both sexes... "

The scheme was ambitious, comprising a school department for boys and a collegiate department in which both young men and women could receive lectures and instruction in the natural sciences, classics, modern languages, English literature and medicine. In 1808, it was further proposed that facilities should be provided for professors of divinity responsible to their respective denominations, so that the institution could become a seminary for the training of ministers. As might have been anticipated, the Presbyterian Church, which had no such facility in Ireland (their candidates for ordination had to train in Glasgow), alone took up the offer. Lord Castlereagh perceived "a deep laid scheme again to bring the Presbyterian Synod within the ranks of democracy". Arthur Wellesley (the future Duke of Wellington) concurred. The entire project was "democratical"—pervaded by "the republican spirit of the Presbyterians".

William Bruce and his friends mocked the proposed system of governance, comparing it to revolutionary French constitutions that had excited debate in Belfast in the 1790s. It was a "machine", they suggested, "so full of checks that it will not move". The sovereign body of the institution was as an annual general meeting of subscribers. They elected both boards of managers and visitors, but with a complicated system of rotation "to preclude the possibility of the management falling into the hands of a few individuals". The proposal for the institution, nonetheless, received sufficient establishment support to secure a charter in 1810.

Belfast Academical Institution Act 1810
- Act of Parliament
- Parliament of the United Kingdom
- Long title: An Act to incorporate and regulate an Institution, to be called "The Belfast Academical Institution," for affording to Youth a Classical and Mercantile Education.
- Citation: 50 Geo. 3. c. cxciii

Dates
- Royal assent: 15 June 1810

Text of statute as originally enacted

William Stuart, Anglican primate archbishop of Ireland, enrolled as a first class subscriber, and George Chichester, 2nd Marquess of Donegall, the town's landlord, leased the land to the institution and, on 3 July 1810, laid its foundation stone. The eminent English architect John Soane, who designed the new Bank of England in 1788, prepared drawings free of charge. A total of £25,000 was raised: £5,000 in India under the patronage of the Governor-General, Earl of Moira, Francis Rawdon-Hastings, the balance largely from Belfast merchants and businessmen able to nominate in return one boy to receive free education. The funds, however, sufficed to erect only one, comparatively plain brown-brick, section of Soane's intended stucco and Doric-column quadrangle. The institution was formally opened on 1 February 1814.

In his address at the opening of the grammar school on 1 February 1814, Drennan promised that "the mysterious veil that makes one knowledge for the learned and another for the vulgar... would be torn down". Admission would be "perfectly unbiased by religious distinctions" (Drennan counted among his subscribers Fr. William Crolly, who as Roman Catholic Archbishop of Armagh in 1831 was to support the government's plans for non-denominational National Schools). Fees would be held "as low as possible". More startling for the times, discipline would rely on "example" rather than on "manual correction of corporal punishment". This may have owed something to the example of an earlier Belfast schoolmaster whose portrait was to hang in the new institution, David Manson. As recounted by Drennan, in his Donegall Street school in 1760s Manson had banished "drudgery and fear" by teaching children on "the principle of amusement".

=== "Wars of independence" ===
When in the following year, 1815, the collegiate department enrolled its first students, it became the first university college to be established in the British Isles since Trinity College Dublin was founded at the end of the sixteenth century. It soon ran into controversy.

At a St. Patrick's Day dinner in 1816, chaired by Robert Tennent, board members did not disguise their broader political sympathies. They led one another, and staff, in a series of radical toasts: to the French and South American Revolutions, to Catholic Emancipation and a "Radical Reform of the Representation of the People in Parliament", and, perhaps most controversially, to "the exiles of Erin" under "the wing of the republican eagle" in the United States. Despite the resignation of all the board members present, the government seized upon the incident to attach conditions the annual £1,500 it had granted, reluctantly, for the college's seminary. Inst historian, James Jamieson, is convinced that "what the government really wanted was to do away with the collegiate status of Inst and so prevent the establishment of a native seminary for the Presbyterian ministry where a culture opposed to passive acceptance of the ideas of privilege and class distinction might be imbibed".

Tory critics of the institution might also have been noted that in 1815 a list of books prepared for the literary department included works by the English radicals John Horne Tooke, William Godwin, Joseph Priestley and Thomas Belsham. But, perhaps convinced that in the face of the "Catholic democracy" conjured by the great "Emancipator" Daniel O'Connell the republican spirit of Ulster Presbyterianism was sufficiently cooled, by 1831 government had not only restored the grant; King William IV bestowed upon the Institution the title "Royal".

Yet further controversy followed. Conservative Presbyterian clergy, led by Henry Cooke, believed the teaching staff combined theological laxity—their refusal to subscribe to Westminster Confession of Faith with its reference to the Pope as the "Antichrist", and affirmation of the Holy Trinity—with political error. Staff did not hide their support for the disestablishment of the Church of Ireland (privileged in relation to Presbyterians but, in Cooke's view, a bulwark of the Protestant interest in Ireland).

Cooke did not succeed in removing either of the principal objects of his ire: those he accused of anti-trinitarian "Arian" or "Socinian" heresy, Henry Montgomery, head of the English department, and the junior William Bruce (who had departed from his father's orthodoxy), Professor of Latin and Greek. The Board refused an inquisition into their religious orthodoxy. But while Inst may have won what Jamieson called its "wars of independence", the dispute contributed to the establishment in 1853 of Assembly College, a seminary under the direct control of the Presbyterian Synod, and to the government passing over the institution in establishing a Queens College (the later Queens University). Inst had upheld its principles but at the cost of its collegiate status and the associated government grant.

On 1 November 1855, Lord Lieutenant of Ireland, the Earl of Carlisle, unveiled a statue in front of the institution on College Square East of the popular Frederick Richard, Earl of Belfast, son of the Marquis of Donegall, patron of, among other causes in Belfast, the Working Class Association for the Promotion of General Improvement. After Henry Cooke died in 1868, significance was attached to his bronze likeness displacing that of the young liberal aristocrat, and that it should stand with its back to the institution Cooke distrusted.

Owing to the initiative of Dr. James MacDonnell ("the unchallenged doyen of Belfast medicine"). from 1835, the Collegiate Department had provided Ulster with its first medical school in Ulster. It had its own teaching hospital, the Royal Institution Hospital in Barrack Street, sometimes known as the College Hospital. In 1847 the school and college building themselves served as a fever hospital. In Belfast, typhus, a deadly companion of the hunger driving country people into the town, struck one in every five residents.

RBAI continued to provide college education until Queens College Belfast opened in October 1849. When it was found that the new college had made no provision for anatomical and dissecting rooms, RBAI continued to provide the necessary accommodation in its old medical department until 1862.

The Collegiate Department was to leave the town an important enlightenment legacy in the Belfast Natural History and Philosophical Society. Formed by staff and scholars in 1821, the society is the origin of both the Botanical Gardens and what is now the Ulster Museum.

=== First generations ===
Among the early graduates of the Institution was William Tennent's nephew, Robert Tennent, who in the 1820s was a member of John Stuart Mill's London Debating Society. Together with his friend James Emerson (Belfast Academy), he joined Byron in the Greek War of Independence. On return to Belfast they stood against one another in the 1832 election, Tennent the Whig losing to Emerson, the Tory, a result that marked the ebb-tide of political liberalism in Belfast.

In mid century, General Certificates from the Collegiate Department were common to several Presbyterian ministers who, in the wake of the Great Famine, became passionately involved in the tenants rights movement. Cooke denounced them for undermining, not only property, but also the Union by sharing platforms with Catholics intent on restoring a parliament in Dublin. His worst fears were realised in David Bell who, forced to resign his ministry and despairing of constitutional methods, was sworn into Irish Republican Brotherhood by Jeremiah O'Donovan Rossa.

Several campaigning newspaper editors were also students of the Institution: James Simms, editor of the Northern Whig; James MacNeight, editor of the Londonderry Standard and of the Belfast-based Banner of Ulster; and Charles Gavan Duffy, of the Young Ireland paper, The Nation. Duffy, a Roman Catholic from Monaghan, enrolled in the collegiate school of logic, rhetoric and belles-lettres in the early 1840s.

Duffy was also to contribute to the Belfast-based Northern Herald, edited between 1834 and 1835 by the "Old Instonian" Thomas O'Hagan. O'Hagan would go on to become the first Catholic Lord Chancellor of Ireland (1868–1874 and 1880–1881).

=== The limits of non-denominationalism ===
Drennan was adamant that the admission of scholars should be "perfectly unbiased by religious distinctions". Yet when O'Hagan was at RBAI in the 1820s, the Oxford Dictionary of National Biography records him as being the school's only Catholic pupil.

In the 1830s Henry Cooke and other leading Protestant evangelicals had been instrumental in defeating the prospects for integrated education. When the Dublin Castle administration sought to provide Ireland, "in advance of anything available at that time in England", a system of grant-aided non-denominational National Schools. Cooke, at once scented danger in the freedom that would have been granted priests to enter schools and instruct their "own" students in religion. The concept of educating Catholics and Protestants together, while it had been endorsed by Crolly as bishop and archbishop, was dealt a further blow when in the 1840s his colleagues in the Catholic hierarchy objected to the "Godless" Queen's Colleges, loudly seconded—despite the pleas of Duffy's fellow Young Irelander, Thomas Davis that "the reasons for separate education are reasons for separate life"—by Daniel O'Connell.

When in 1849 a Queen's College (now Queen's University) opened in Belfast, the Collegiate Department closed. RBAI continued as a school for boys, with both day and boarding pupils. There was no standard course as such. Boys’ parents paid only for the subjects their sons took. Mathematics, English and writing were the most popular subjects, classics and French less so.

The three hundred boys attending were largely, but not exclusively, Presbyterian in what remained a largely Presbyterian town. Those taking the Anglican communion (in the established Church of Ireland), had, from the seventeenth century, attended The Royal School, Armagh and Portora Royal School, and in Belfast favoured the older Belfast—now also "Royal"—Academy. From 1774 the Quakers had had Friends' School, Lisburn; and from 1865 Wesleyans attended Methodist College Belfast. Co-educational "Methody" was to emerge in the 20th century as RBAI's closest rival and competitor. The dramatist and novelist F. Frankfort Moore, attending RBAI in the 1860s, recalls "not half a dozen Roman Catholic boys". St Malachy's Catholic diocesan college had opened its doors in 1833.

=== Industry and empire ===
A study sample of 96 members of the Belfast's mid-nineteenth-century civic elite—leading figures in trade, industry and the professions—found a plurality, a third, had attended RBAI. The school clearly held "a proud place in Belfast society".

In industrial Belfast, the path to civic prominence did necessarily lead through further education. In the 1860s two boys left the school, age 15, to begin apprenticeships in Belfast's engineering giant, Harland and Wolff. William Pirrie rose to become the shipbuilder's chairman, and Alexander Carlisle the yard manager. In 1889, they were joined by another Instonian, Thomas Andrews, who became head of the draughting department. All of them were involved in the design and construction of what in their day were the largest ships afloat, the Oceanic II in 1899, and Olympic in 1911 and its sister ship the Titanic, with which Andrews went down on its lll-fated maiden voyage in 1912.

Beginning in the 1840s, the Indian Civil Service examination (administered in its last years by the Collegiate Department) opened the imperial service to Irish school graduates, both Catholic and Protestant. Service in India and in the broader British Empire was a common career path for Instonians over the coming century. Having applied to the Indian Civil Service at the end of this era in 1940, Noel Larmour (1934) had the task, and beginning with Burma, of helping wind up the Empire in several of its territories.

Over 700 old boys of the school served in the various theatres of the World War I. 132 of them died.

=== The modern school ===
Until the end of the nineteenth century, RBAI did not have a principal or a headmaster. The academic and administrative direction of the school had remained in the hands of a group of senior teachers (the headmasters) who sat on the board of masters. The first principal, Robert Dods, headmaster of modern languages, was appointed in 1898. Since then RBAI has had eight principals, R. M. Jones (1898–1925), G. Garrod (1925–1939), J. C. A. Brierley (1939–1940), J. H. Grummitt (1940–1959), S. V. Peskett (1959–1978), T. J. Garrett (1978–1990), R. M. Ridley (1990–2006). The current principal, J. A. Williamson was appointed in January 2007 and is the first female to hold the post until on 3 September 2025, it was announced that she would be retiring at the end of the 2025-2026 school year. On 5 January 2026, it has been announced that she is to be replaced by Dr. Craig Walker, the headmaster of Pitsford School, Northamptonshire.

At the end of the nineteenth century, improving transport services into Belfast and, more importantly, the need to provide additional classroom space to accommodate the greatly increasing numbers of pupils seeking enrolment persuaded the governors to end boarding. Since 1902 the school has been for day pupils only.

Between 1864 and 1898 RBAI had a small preparatory school on the main site in College Square, situated in the North Wing. In 1917, the board of governors opened a new preparatory school, with a small boarding department, Inchmarlo, in south Belfast, in Marlborough Park North. In 1935, Inchmarlo transferred from Marlborough Park to its present site at Mount Randal in Cranmore Park. The preparatory school is an integral part of The Royal Belfast Academical Institution.

In the 1920s, in the period of Geoffrey Garrod's principalship, the house system was founded, and a school uniform, including the ubiquitous yellow and black quartered cap, was worn for the first time.

In the Second World War, 106 Old Instonians fell in the conflict. During the war, younger pupils attended branch schools at The Royal School, Dungannon, and at the house known as Fairy Hill in Osborne Gardens. Air-raid shelters were built on the rear quad and a barrage balloon was anchored to the middle of the front lawn.

The serious civil disorder affecting Belfast in the 1970s and 1980s was a considerable challenge to RBAI as a city centre school. The Europa, close to the school, was reputedly "the most bombed hotel in the world", having been hit 36 times. RBAI had regular bomb alerts, causing the entire school to evacuate and assemble on the front lawn, but in the course of the Troubles not one day of school was lost.

Since the 1980s, RBAI has benefited from a number of major infrastructure investments: the Jack McDowell Pavilion at Osborne Park, the purpose-built sixth form centre, a multi-function sports centre and fitness suite, the Christ Church Centre of Excellence, the new pavilion at Bladon Park, a water-based synthetic hockey pitch at Shaw's Bridge and the Centre of Innovation in the technology department.

RBAI currently has over one thousand pupils on the main site and over two hundred pupils in the preparatory department, Inchmarlo. About 150 new pupils enter every year.

== Curriculum ==
For the first three years, boys normally follow a common curriculum: in the fourth year the curriculum is still general but certain options are introduced, and at the end of the fifth, boys sit the examination for the Northern Ireland GCSE. Subjects studied at AS/A2 level in the sixth form include English, modern history, geography, economics, French, German, Spanish, Greek, Latin, physical education, business studies, technology, mathematics, further mathematics, physics, politics, chemistry, biology, music and art.

== Principals ==
No.	Name	Tenure
1	Robert Dods	1897
2	Robert Jones	1898–1925
3	Geoffrey Garrod	1925–1939
4	John Brierley	1939–1940
5	John Grummitt	1940–1959
6	Victor Peskett	1959–1978
7	Tom Garrett	1978–1990
8	Michael Ridley	1990–2006
9	Janet Williamson	2007–2026
10	Dr. Craig Walker	2026–

== Houses ==
House	House colour
Jones	Yellow
Kelvin	Green
Larmor	Black {appears as white on tie}
Pirrie	Blue
Stevenson	Brown
Dill	Red

== Sports and societies ==
Clubs and societies include a school orchestra, choir and band, a contingent of the Combined Cadet Force, Scouts and Explorer Scouts (74th) and a community service group.

=== Sport ===
The school offers sports, with rugby union being the most dominant. RBAI have won the Ulster Schools Cup outright 34 times along with four shared titles, winning the cup most recently in 2024 for a back to back win against Ballymena Academy. Rugby and hockey are played in the winter; athletics, cricket (played at Osborne Park) and lawn tennis occupy the summer months; badminton, fencing, rowing, squash and swimming (including water polo and life-saving) take place throughout the year. Teams representing the school take part not only in matches and activities within the province, but also in events open to all schools in the United Kingdom.

The 1st XI has featured in the finals of all three competitions they enter (The Irish Schools Tournament, The McCullough Cup and the Burney Cup). In 2016 four Instonians played Olympic hockey, three for Ireland and one for Great Britain. RBAI is one of only four schools in Northern Ireland to participate in competitive rowing. In 2005 the first ever RBAI crew travelled to the Henley Royal Regatta in England. It participates in various regattas throughout Ireland and abroad.

In 1952 the school sent a team to the British Schools Athletic Championship at the White City, London. German schools also participated. RBAI won the 4 x 110 yards relay.

In swimming the school teams go to competitions within Ireland and abroad. In 2005, three of the team qualified for the Irish International Schools Squad. In the same year the senior team came 3rd in the Bath Cup competition held in London.

Water polo teams have competed in various events and tours, the most recent to the Netherlands in 2006. In January 2007 the team came runners-up in the Irish Schools Water Polo Championships. Football is played at Inst with three senior teams competing in league and cup competitions. Since 2010 the swimming team has won the Bath Cup three times, the Otter Medley Cup twice and the Otter Challenge Cup four times.

=== Music ===
Musical groups include the choir, the orchestra, the jazz band, and the string group.

=== Scouting ===
The school sponsors 74th Belfast (RBAI) Scout Group which opened on 12 February 1926. The first Group Scoutmaster was William (Billy) Greer who led the group for 38 years. One of the first patrol leaders, Wilfred M Brennan, became Chief Commissioner for Northern Ireland. In 1929, the group was so large it contained three troops.

War time saw a former assistant scoutmaster, John Haire, killed when his Hurricane fighter was shot down on 6 May 1940. His family donated an annual prize for scouting activity. By 1945, 205 out of 430 former members had served in the armed forces or in the merchant navy. A memorial cairn was built on Bessy Bell near Baronscourt in County Tyrone to commemorate the 18 old boys who were killed in the war. There is a memorial plaque in Baronscourt Parish Church.

In 1940, JH Grummit became school principal and later became the group's first county commissioner. In 1947, three Sea Scout Patrols were formed. The Duke of Edinburgh's Award Scheme was started in the early 1960s.

Ronnie Hiscocks led the group from 1965 to 1992. September 1970 saw the formation of the new venture unit for boys aged 16 and older. In 1987, the 100th Gold Duke of Edinburgh's Award was presented to a member of 74th. The sea and land sections combined in 1971. That same year saw the group travelled to the continent for the first time, to Kandersteg in Switzerland.

1995 saw a long record of consecutive summer camps come to an end.

In 1997, David Scott became the group's fourth leader. 2005 saw the group travel outside Europe for the first time, to Canada. In 2008, the group partnered with Habitat for Humanity NI to go to Argentina to build homes for the poor. Trips to Mozambique, Cambodia and Ethiopia followed. In 2011, a number of scouts met Prince Edward and Scott became Belfast County Commissioner. In 2012, a contingent of Scouts attended President Obama's visit to Belfast's Waterfront Hall. 2015 saw the group become a registered charity. 2016 saw a number of 90th anniversary celebrations.

The group continued to maintain participation with 85 young people in the scout troop (ages 10.5 to 14), the explorer unit (14 to 18) and the scout network (18 to 25) in 2017.

=== Debating ===
The school's debating society, more properly known as the Royal Academical Debating Society, is the oldest continuously extant body of its kind in Ireland and is currently overseen by Lynn Gordon and Chris Leathley. The society meets regularly at both junior and senior level and aims to develop initiative, confidence, and an appreciation of the culture of both debate and civilised argument. Two internal competitions are run within RBAI. There is an inter-house debating competition (current champions are Larmor), and the Gawin Orr Public Speaking Competition which are both held annually. The society also holds an annual dinner at which members celebrate past successes and wish leaving members well.

The inaugural RBAI Invitational Debating Tournament was held in 2007 and has continued on an annual basis since then. Inst have won this tournament on three occasions (2007, 2009 & 2010) whilst St Malachy's were the victors in 2008. In 2008, an Inst team won the first Debating Matters Competition to be held in Northern Ireland and the following year, Michael Frazer won Best Individual Speaker. School debating teams have recently been some of the most successful in the province, reaching the final of the Northern Ireland Schools Debating Championship on five occasions (1998, 2007, 2010, 2011 and 2014), and have won the competition twice, defeating Thornhill College, Derry in 2007 and Bangor Grammar School in 2011 in the final at Parliament Buildings, Stormont.

Royal Belfast Academical Institution has successfully competed in many European debating competitions. In 2009, the Inst team won the NI European Youth Parliament Competition and went on to represent Northern Ireland in the UK finals held in Durham. In March 2010, Inst also participated in the All-Ireland European Council Debates held annually at Dublin Castle. Representing Germany, the RBAI team were awarded 2nd place out of the 28 teams from across Ireland who competed, with RBAI also winning the TE Utley Memorial Award with an essay on the future of Britain in geopolitics. Inst also regularly participate in the European Council Debates held in Stormont.

== Inchmarlo ==
Royal Belfast Academical Institution has a preparatory department called Inchmarlo, founded in 1907 and now set in a 6-acre (24,000 m^{2}) site on Cranmore Park, off the Malone Road in South Belfast. Inchmarlo House was the former home of Sir William Crawford, a director of the York Street Flax Spinning Mill – it was called "Mount Randal". It employs 11 full-time staff and caters for boys aged between 4 and 11 whose standard uniform consists of traditional school-caps, shorts, knee-high socks, school-blazers and leather satchels. It constantly attains impressive results in the 'Eleven-plus' examination with 75% of pupils gaining an 'A' grade. Of those, approximately 99% (around 40) transfer to the main school every year. The headteacher of Inchmarlo Preparatory School is Mr Peter Moreland.

== Notable alumni ==
Academia and science
- Thomas Andrews (1813–1885), chemist and physicist.
- J. C. Beckett (1912–1996), Irish historian (The Making of Modern Ireland).
- George Benn (1801–1882), Belfast historian, one of the original alumni of the collegiate department, 1819
- Francis Joseph Bigger (1863–1926), antiquarian, architect, Gaelic revivalist, author, editor of the Ulster Journal of Archaeology, grandson of original Inst governors David Bigger
- William Thomson, Lord Kelvin (1824–1907), physicist. (The school's Kelvin house is named after him)
- Sir Joseph Larmor (1857–1942), Lucasian Professor of Mathematics, Cambridge University 1903–1933 (the school's Larmor house is named after him)
- John T. Lewis (1932–2004), Welsh mathematical physicist, Director of the School of Theoretical Physics, Dublin Institute for Advanced Studies (DIAS).
- Stephen Livingstone (1961–2004), Professor of Human Rights Law and head of School of Law, Queen's University Belfast; Equality Commission for Northern Ireland
- James McAdam (1801–1861), naturalist and geologist, President of the Belfast Natural History Society and one of the founders of Belfast Botanic Gardens.
- R. B. McDowell (1913–2011), fellow of Trinity College Dublin, historian of 18th-century Ireland
- Martin McKee (born 1956), professor of public health, London School of Hygiene and Tropical Medicine
- William D. Richardson (born 1951), director of the UCL Wolfson Institute
- Robert Templeton (1802–1892), naturalist, entomologist.

Arts and literature

- William Allingham (1824–1889), poet, diarist and editor
- Wesley Burrowes (1930–2015), playwright and screenwriter
- Alexander Faris (1921–2015), composer, conductor and writer
- Sir Samuel Ferguson (1810–1886), Irish poet, antiquarian, President of the Royal Irish Academy, founder of the (Young Ireland) Protestant Repeal Association.
- Paul Henry (1876–1958), Irish landscape painter
- David Ireland (born 1976), playwright
- Michael Longley (1939–2025), poet
- Robert Wilson Lynd (1879–1949), writer, London literary host, Sinn Féin activist
- Robert Shipboy MacAdam (1808–1895), Irish-language scholar and revivalist
- Denis MacEoin (1949–2022), Middle East analyst, novelist
- Derek Mahon (1941–2020), poet, journalist, screenwriter
- Frank Frankfort Moore (1855–1931), novelist, dramatist
- Kenneth Montgomery (1943–2023), orchestral conductor
- Forrest Reid (1875–1947), Ulster novelist and literary critic
- Christopher Rowden Hill (born 1946), landscape photographer
- Ian Shuttleworth (born 1963), theatre critic

Business and industry

- Thomas Andrews (1873–1912, great grandson of the founder William Drennan), chief naval architect at Harland and Wolff shipyards, went down with RMS Titanic
- Bowman Malcolm (1854–1933), railway civil and mechanical engineer
- Sir Donald Currie (1825–1909), Scottish shipowner, politician and philanthropist
- Henry Musgrave (1827–1922), businessman and philanthropist
- William Pirrie, Viscount Pirrie (1847–1924), chairman of Harland and Wolff. (Pirrie House is named in his memory)
- Mark Pollock (born 1976), blind international rower, entrepreneur and explorer
- Paul Rankin (born 1959), television chef, chain restaurateur.
- Leonard Steinberg, Baron Steinberg (1936–2009), businessman and Conservative life peer.

Government and politics

- J. M. Andrews (1871–1956), second Prime Minister of Northern Ireland
- James Armour (1841–1928), Liberal Home Ruler, tenant-right campaigner.
- David Bell (1818–1890), Executive Council Irish Republican Brotherhood; founding member of the Tenant League
- Sir Kenneth Percy Bloomfield (born 1931), Head of Northern Ireland Civil Service, NI Victims Commissioner.
- Sir Samuel Knox Cunningham (1909–1976), Unionist MP, Parliamentary Private Secretary to Prime Minister Harold Macmillan.
- Roy Bradford (1920–1988), NI Parliament MP and Government minister; minister in the 1974 "Sunningdale" Executive; journalist, novelist
- James Horner Haslett (1832–1905), Unionist MP for Belfast West and Mayor of Belfast
- Sir Francis Hincks (1807–1885), Co-Premier, Province of Canada; Minister of Finance, Confederation of Canada
- Denis Ireland (1894–1974), Clann na Poblachta member of Seanad Éireann (the Irish Senate), writer, journalist, broadcaster.
- John Kinnear (1824–1909), Liberal MP for Donegal, tenant-right campaigner
- Lord Laird (1944–2018), Ulster Unionist life peer
- Christopher Maccabe (born 1946), Political Director of the Northern Ireland Office and British Joint Secretary of the British-Irish Intergovernmental Conference
- Brian Mawhinney (1940–2019), Chairman of the Conservative Party, English Member of Parliament, Cabinet minister
- Lembit Öpik (born 1965), Liberal Democrat MP for Montgomeryshire (1997–2010).
- Thomas Sinclair (1838–1914), Liberal Unionist, drafted the Ulster Covenant
- William Pirrie Sinclair (1837–1900), tenant-right Liberal MP
- Robert James Tennent (1803–1880), Whig MP for Belfast, veteran of Greek War of Independence

Law

- Lord Carswell of Killeen (1934–2023), Lord Chief Justice of Northern Ireland, Law Lord*
- William Huston Dodd (1844–1930), Irish Liberal MP and High Court Justice
- Joseph R. Fisher (1855–1939), barrister, editor of the Belfast Newsletter, author, and Unionist commissioner on the Irish Boundary Commission
- Maurice Gibson (1913–1987), Northern Ireland Lord Justice of Appeal. Assassinated by the Provisional Irish Republican Army (IRA).
- Lord Lowry (1919–1999), Lord Chief Justice of Northern Ireland, Law Lord, President of RBAI (1996–1999)
- Lord Thomas O'Hagan (1812–1885), first Roman Catholic Lord Chancellor of Ireland
- Christopher Salmon Patterson (1823–1893), judge of the Supreme Court of Canada

Media

- Peter Barron (born 1962), editor of BBC Newsnight, Google's head of external relations for Europe, Middle East and Africa
- James Winder Good (1877–1930), Northern Whig, later Freeman's Journal/Irish Independent, lead writer; author and playwright.
- Ian Knox (born 1943), political cartoonist
- Jim Neilly, BBC boxing and rugby commentator
- Stephen Nolan (born 1973), BBC radio and television presenter

Medicine

- Philip Caves (1940–1978), Irish pioneer cardiothoracic surgeon
- Sir Henry Kenneth Cowan (1900–1971), physician and dietary expert, Chief Medical Officer of Health to Scotland
- Sir Ian Fraser (1901–1999), President of the Royal College of Surgeons in Ireland, President of the British Medical Association, founding Chairman of the Northern Ireland Police Authority
- Allen Hill (1937–2021), Emeritus Professor of Bioinorganic Chemistry at the University of Oxford

Military

- Colonel Tim Collins, Commanding Officer of the 1st Battalion, Royal Irish Regiment in Iraq during Operation Telic (2001)
- Maj Gen Jeremy Rowan (born 1957), Director General Army Medical Services
- Brigadier John Alexander Sinton (1884–1956), doctor, malariologist and recipient of the Victoria Cross
- General Sir James Stuart Steele (1894–1975), Commander-in-Chief (C-in-C) and High Commissioner in Austria in 1946
- Air Vice Marshal Sir William Tyrrell (1885–1968), rugby union international, Principal Medical Officer Middle East, honorary surgeon to King George VI
- Colonel Philip James Woods (1880–1961), led the Karelian Regiment ("Irish Karelians"), Allied Intervention North Russia; General Staff Lithuanian Army, Independent NI MP West Belfast.

Religion

- Robert Raymond Davey (1915–2012), Presbyterian minister, peace and reconciliation activist, founder of the Corrymeela Community
- John Edgar (1798–1866), Moderator of the Presbyterian Church of Ireland, originator of the Temperance movement, Gaelic revivalist
- James Haire (born 1946), Australian theologian, president of the National Council of Churches in Australia
- James McCann (1897–1983), Church of Ireland Archbishop of Armagh and Primate of All Ireland
- James Shannon (1799–1859), American pro-slavery evangelist, President of the University of Missouri.

Sport

- Keith Crossan, Irish rugby international, Ulster Rugby player
- Colin Patterson, Irish rugby international, Ulster Rugby player, British and Irish Lion
- Sam Walker, Irish rugby international, Ulster Rugby player, British and Irish Lion
- Ronnie Lamont, Irish rugby international, Ulster Rugby player, British and Irish Lion
- David Irwin, Irish rugby international, Ulster Rugby player, British and Irish Lion
- Mark Gleghorne, Irish and Great Britain hockey international, Olympian
- John Jackson, Irish hockey captain and Olympian
- Michael Lowry, Irish rugby international, Ulster Rugby player
- James Hume, Irish rugby international, Ulster Rugby player
- Paul Shields, Irish rugby international, Ulster Rugby player
- Roger Wilson, Irish rugby international, Ulster Rugby player
- Ryan Caldwell, Irish rugby international, Ulster Rugby player
- David Hewitt (rugby union, born 1939), British & Irish Lions, Ireland & Ulster Rugby player
- Dermott Monteith, the Ireland Cricket Team's all-time leading wicket taker
- Sammy Nelson, former Arsenal and Northern Ireland footballer
- Dawson Stelfox, the leader of the 1993 Irish Expedition to Mount Everest and the first Northern Irishman to reach the summit
- Albert Stewart, Irish rugby international who died in World War I
- Ian Stewart, Northern Ireland international footballer
- Robin Thompson, who captained the British and Irish Lions rugby team on their 1955 tour to South Africa
