= Mairtín Crawford =

Mairtín Crawford (25 November 1967 – 11 January 2004) was a poet and journalist who was born and educated in Belfast, Northern Ireland.

Crawford was educated at Rathmore Grammar School and then Queen's University Belfast. He died after a fall at home.

He co-founded and edited the Big Spoon literary arts magazine in the 1990s, was production and arts editor of Fortnight magazine, was a creative writing tutor at (amongst other places) the Crescent Arts Centre for eight years, and was appointed Director of Between The Lines Arts Festival for 2004.

Crawford brought "Beat" poet Allen Ginsberg to Belfast in 1993 for two public reading events. Among several trips to the US, in 2001 (as the recipient of an Arts Council Individual Artists’ Award) he travelled west and met with NASA personnel to research a book of poetry dealing with the concept and implications of space flight. Some of the resulting poems are published in his (posthumous) Selected Poems. His memory is kept alive by the annual Mairtin Crawford literature award which is part of the Belfast Book Festival.

== Bibliography ==
- Selected Poems (Lagan Press, 2005)

== See also ==
- List of Northern Irish writers
