= Six Bells Colliery =

Colliery located in Wales

Coordinates: 51°43′10.71″N 3°8′00.39″W

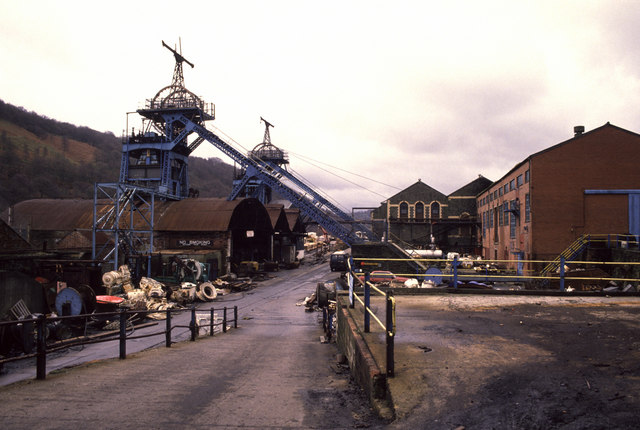
Six Bells colliery before demolition in 1989

Six Bells Colliery was a colliery located in Six Bells, Abertillery, Gwent, Wales. On 28 June 1960 it was the site of an underground explosion which killed 45 of the 48 miners working in that part of the mine. It is now the site of the artistically acclaimed Guardian memorial to those events, designed by Sebastian Boyesen; although the memorial primarily commemorates those who died at Six Bells, it is dedicated to all mining communities wherever they may be.

== Sinking ==
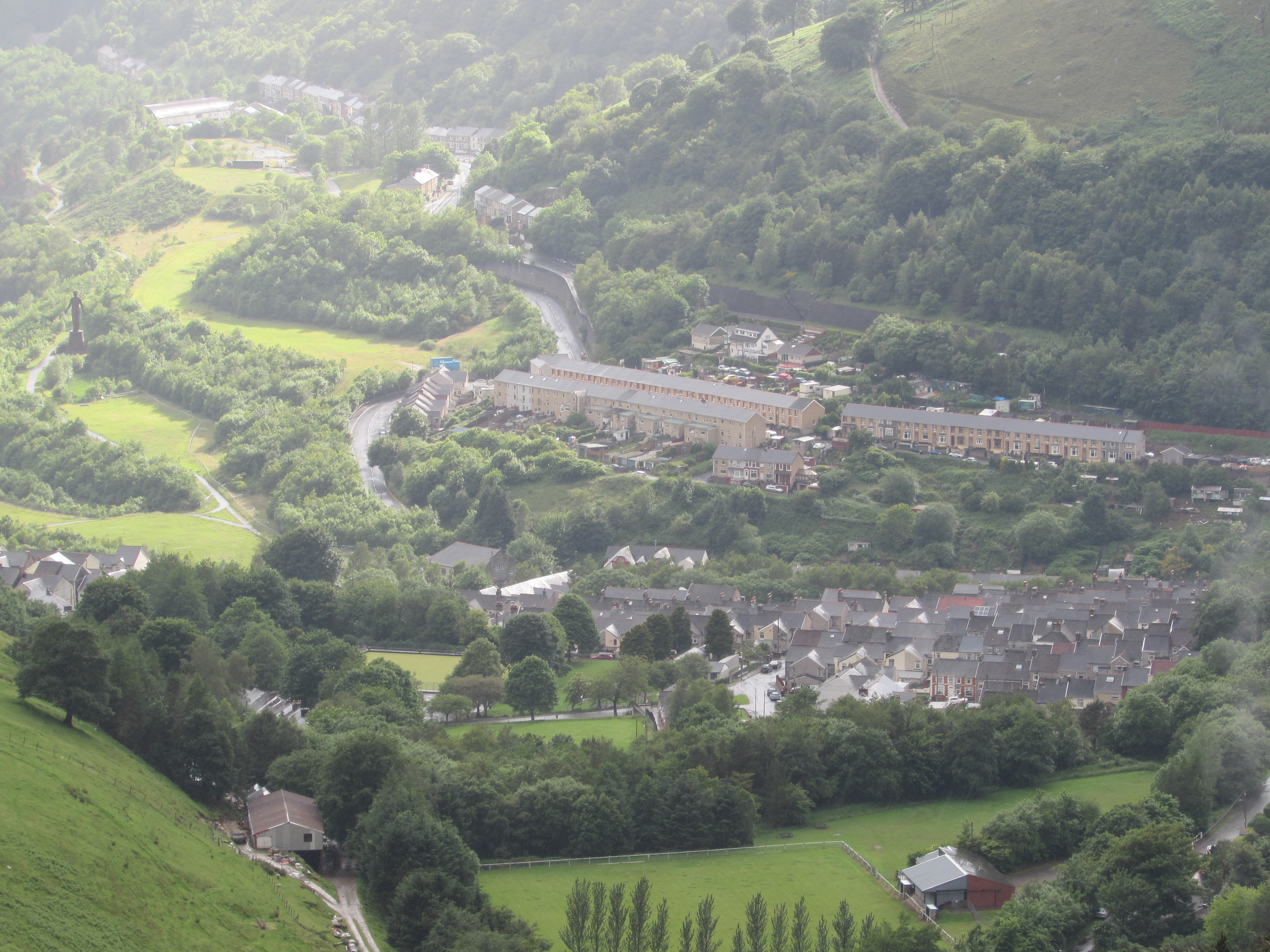
Six Bells as viewed from the mountain

The colliery was originally opened as Arael Griffin on the site of an earlier balance shaft which had been sunk in 1863 by Thomas Phillips Price at Hafod Van. In 1892 John Lancaster and Co. began sinking two 352 yards (322 m) shafts on the opposite side of the Ebbw Fach River. On 9 February 1895 four men lost their lives during the shaft sinking, when the bowk (large barrel) in which they were riding capsized, and they fell to the shaft bottom.

== Private operation: 1896-1947 ==
By 1896 it was owned by Partridge Jones and Co., when there were 173 men employed in the sinking, including 101 on the surface. Coal winding began at Six Bells in 1898, and was transported south to Newport on the Newport and Pontypool Railway, later part of the Great Western Railway.

Hafod Van slope was opened in 1909, and employed 122 men by 1910. It closed in 1914 due to a lack of manpower, when the colliery employed 2,857 men. A New Hafod Van slope was opened in 1922, and was worked until 1928. By 1923, there were 859 men employed at No.4 pit, working the Big Vein and Three Quarter seams. At No.5 there were 1,529 men employed, working the Black and Meadow Vein seams.

Due to the economic downturn, Six Bells was mothballed in 1930 for several years because of lack of trade. John Paton took over the mine in 1936 until nationalisation in 1947, when there were 1,534 men employed.

== Nationalisation ==
The neighbouring Vivian Colliery closed in 1958 and for some years the Vivian's shaft was used as a downcast for Six Bells. By the beginning of 1960, the colliery was producing 338,000 tonnes of coal and employed 1,291 men.

== Six Bells Colliery Disaster ==
On 28 June 1960, at approximately 10:45, an explosion took place in the West District of the Old Coal Seam, caused by an ignition of firedamp. Coal-dust in the air ignited and the explosion spread almost throughout the district. Killing 45 out of the 48 men who worked in that district of the mine, the tragedy would have been even worse had it not been for maintenance work taking place on the O.10 face where otherwise 125 men would have been working.

Lethal concentrations of carbon monoxide gas were found to be present. This suggested that the men lost consciousness rapidly and that death occurred within minutes. A public inquiry into the disaster took place at No 2 Court of Newport Civic Centre, between 19 and 28 September 1960. The Inspector of Mines reported that the probable cause of the explosion was firedamp ignited by a spark from a stone falling onto a steel girder.

== Merger with Marine Colliery, closure ==
As part of the National Coal Board's strategic move to super-pits in the 1970s, Six Bells was integrated with Marine Colliery at Cwm. All coal after that point was raised through Marine. The whole complex was closed by British Coal in 1988.

== Guardian memorial ==
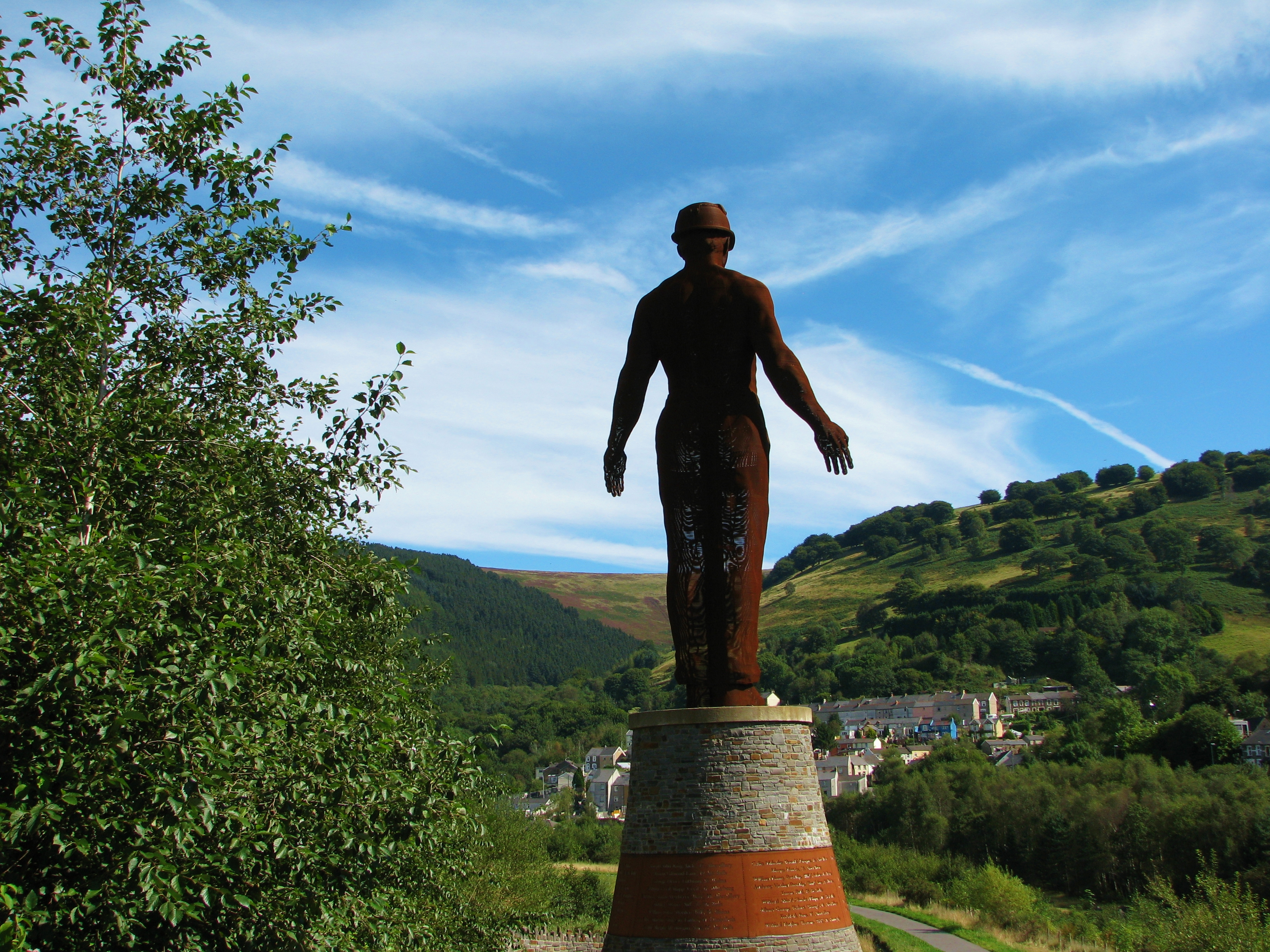
The Guardian sculpture, overlooking Six Bells

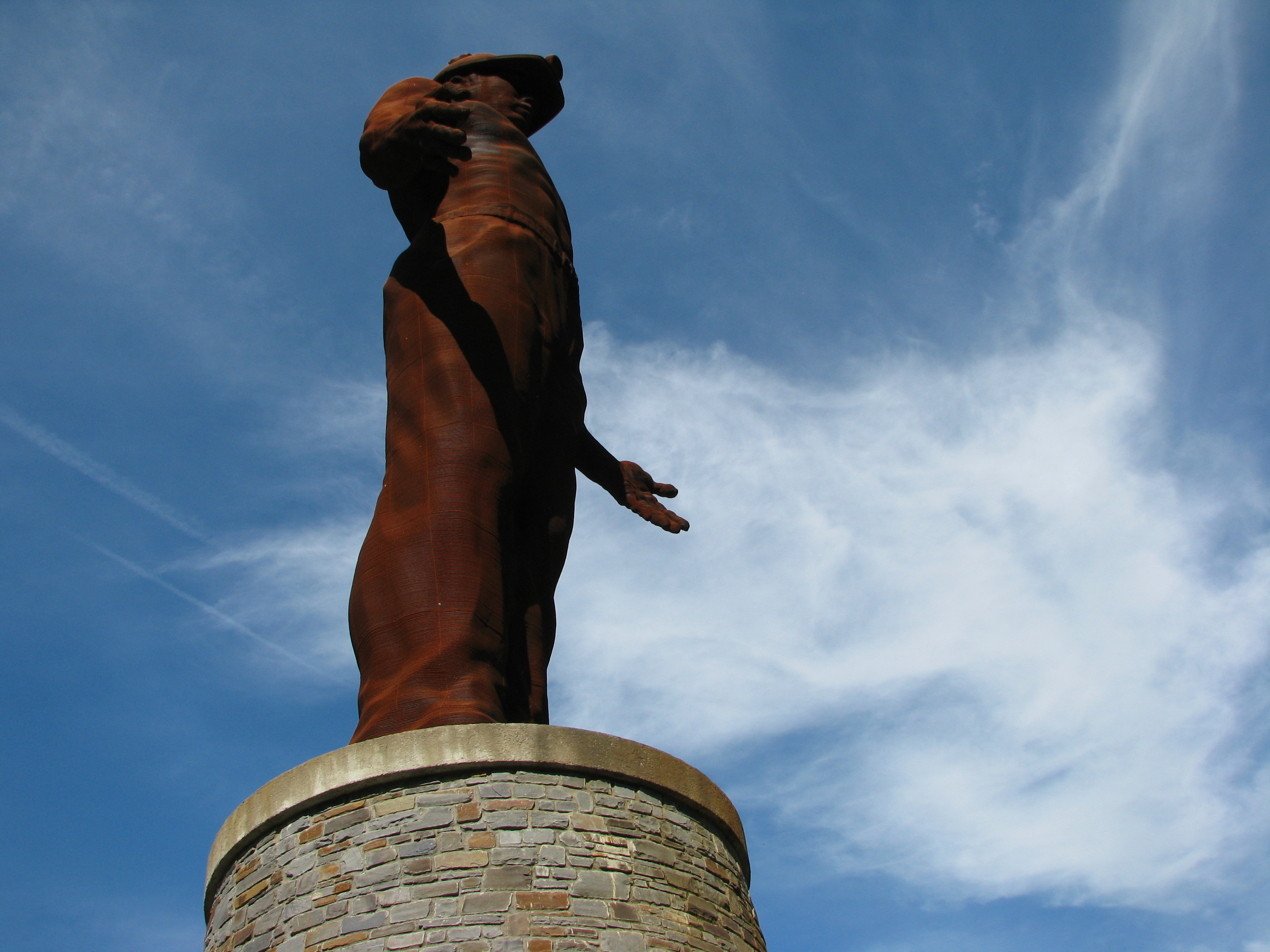
Close-up of the sculpture

The former colliery site has been landscaped and renamed Parc Arael Griffin. It has its own visitor centre in Ty Ebbw Fach just outside the main entrance. With a restaurant, conference and a "valleys mining town experience" room, it is open most days. The Parc is also now a point on the Ebbw Fach trail. In 2010 a 20-metre (66 ft) high statue called the Guardian was erected near the site of the old colliery to commemorate the 1960 disaster. Designed by Sebastian Boyesen, it was fabricated from thousands of steel ribbons. The statue was unveiled by The Archbishop of Canterbury, Dr Rowan Williams on 28 June 2010 and has been described as "a Welsh answer to Antony Gormley's Angel of the North".

== Notable workers at Six Bells Colliery ==
- Ness Edwards
- George Silverthorne - early recruit of the Communist Party of Great Britain.
