= Stephen Livingstone =

Irish law professor (1961–2004)

Stephen Livingstone (1961 – March 2004) was Professor of Human Rights Law at Queen's University Belfast from 1998 until his sudden death in March 2004. He was Head of the School of Law from 2000 to 2003 and Director of the Human Rights Centre thereafter. He was an internationally renowned scholar in the fields of human rights, constitutional law and prison law, and was a member of the Equality Commission for Northern Ireland. The QUB School of Law established a studentship in his honour in the areas of human rights law or public law. The fund is supported also by donations from his family and friends.

== Early life ==
He was born in Belfast and was educated at the Royal Belfast Academical Institution and Clare College, Cambridge, where he read law, and earned an LLM from Harvard Law School.

Guardian obituary
