= Henry Kenneth Cowan =

Irish-born Nutritionist

- Born: 17 June 1900; Belfast
- Died: 16 June 1971 (aged 70); Edinburgh
- Other names: Sir H K Cowan
- Occupation: British nutritionist

Sir Henry Kenneth Cowan FRSE LLD (1900–1971) was an Irish-born physician and dietary expert. He wrote several books on the subject of nutrition and his expertise was used by the British government during the Second World War. He served as Chief Medical Officer to Scotland for a decade (1954–64).

== Life ==
He was born in Belfast in Ireland on 17 June 1900 the son of Henry Cowan and Margaret Cowan née Curran. He attended the Royal Belfast Academical Institution and then the University of Belfast, graduating in 1921. He then studied Public Health at postgraduate level, receiving a Diploma in Public Health in 1924. He received his medical degree (MD) in 1925 and appears to have operated for around ten years as a general practitioner.

From 1937 to 1949 he was County Medical Officer of Health to Gloucester. From 1949 to 1954 he served the same role for the county of Essex. From 1954 until retiral in 1964 he was Chief Medical Officer to the Department of Health in Scotland.

In 1956 he was elected a Fellow of the Royal Society of Scotland his proposers including J. Norman Davidson, Norman Feather and Douglas Guthrie. In the 1957-8 New Years Honours List he was created a Knight for his services to British health. In 1964 Glasgow University awarded him an honorary Doctor of Letters (LLD).

He died in Edinburgh on 16 June 1971.

== Family ==
He married twice: firstly in 1933 to Elinor Margaret Graham; secondly, following Elinor’s death in 1966, he married in his old age (1970) to a widow, Mrs J. C. McMillan. He had no children.

== Publications ==
- Communal Dietaries in War-Time
- The Health Services in the County of Essex (1953)
- Glasgow’s X-Ray Campaign against Tuberculosis (1957)
- The Climate of Health (1959)
