= Colette Bryce =

Northern Irish poet

Colette Bryce FRSL
- Born: Derry, Northern Ireland
- Education: Thornhill College; St Mary's University, Twickenham
- Occupations: Poet, writer and editor
- Writing career
- Notable works: The Whole & Rain-domed Universe, 2014
- Notable awards: Cholmondeley Award, 2010; Eric Gregory Award, 1995
- Website: www.colettebryce.com

Colette Bryce is a poet, freelance writer, and editor. She was a Fellow in Creative Writing at the University of Dundee from 2003 to 2005, and a North East Literary Fellow at the University of Newcastle upon Tyne from 2005 to 2007. She was the Poetry Editor of Poetry London from 2009 to 2013. In 2019, Bryce succeeded Eavan Boland as editor of Poetry Ireland Review.

== Early life ==
Bryce was born in Derry, Northern Ireland, where she was educated at Thornhill College. Bryce lived in London until 2002, when she moved to Scotland. She moved to the North-East of England in 2005.

== Works ==
Bryce's first published work was included in the 1995 volume Anvil New Poets, ed. Carol Ann Duffy, which also introduced the work of poets Kate Clanchy and Alice Oswald, among others. That year she won an Eric Gregory Award. Her poetry appears in the recent anthologies Modern Women Poets (Bloodaxe), and The New Irish Poets (Bloodaxe), Forward Book of Poetry 2009 (Forward), Hand in Hand (Faber) and the Penguin Book of Irish Poetry (Penguin, 2010).

Her first collection The Heel of Bernadette, published in 2000 by Picador, won the Aldeburgh Poetry Festival Prize and the Strong Award (now known as the Strong/Shine Award) for new Irish poets.

In 2003, Bryce won the National Poetry Competition for her poem "The Full Indian Rope Trick", which became the title-poem of her 2004 collection, short-listed for the T.S. Eliot Prize the following year.

A pamphlet, The Observations of Aleksandr Svetlov, appeared from Donut Press in 2007.

Her third collection Self-Portrait in the Dark was published in 2008 and shortlisted for the Poetry Now Award in 2009. It includes the poem "Self-Portrait in a Broken Wing-Mirror" that won the Academi Cardiff International Poetry Competition in 2007.

In 2010, she received a Cholmondeley Award for poets from the Society of Authors.

A pamphlet ″Ballasting the Ark″, written in response to a Leverhulme fellowship at Dove Marine Laboratory in Cullercoats, was shortlisted for the Ted Hughes Award for new work in poetry in 2012.

Her 2014 collection The Whole & Rain-domed Universe, which draws on the author's experience of growing up in Derry during the Troubles, was awarded a special Christopher Ewart-Biggs Award in memory of Seamus Heaney. The book was also short-listed for Forward Prize for Best Poetry Collection, The Costa Poetry Award, and The Roehampton Poetry Prize.

Selected Poems was awarded the Pigott Prize for Irish poetry in 2017.

Her collection The M Pages was published by Picador in 2020.

Bryce was elected a Fellow of the Royal Society of Literature (FRSL) in 2025.

== Bibliography ==
- The Heel of Bernadette (Picador, 2000)
- The Full Indian Rope Trick (Picador, 2004)
- The Observations of Aleksandr Svetlov' (pamphlet Donut, 2007)
- Ink on Paper: Poetry and Art (ed. Mudfog, 2007)
- Self-Portrait in the Dark (Picador, 2008)
- Ballasting the Ark (pamphlet NCLA, 2012)
- "The Whole & Rain-domed Universe (Picador, 2014)
- Selected Poems (Picador, 2017)
- The M pages (Picador, 2020)
