= Northern Ireland Schools Debating Competition =

Debate tournament

The Northern Ireland Schools Debating Competition is an annual competition involving schools from across Northern Ireland. It was founded in 1993 by Dame Fionnuala Jay-O'Boyle DBE DStJ during her time as Chairman of the Belfast Civic Trust; the final of the competition is held every year in the Senate Chamber of Parliament Buildings, Stormont. It is organised by the Belfast Buildings Preservation Trust (BBPT), and is sponsored by both the Telegraph Media Group and the T.E. Utley Memorial Fund. Lord Lexden of Lexden and Strangford OBE has been President of the competition since 1997 and Mrs. Jay-O'Boyle is chairman. Lord Trimble and Lord Dubs were patrons in 2010.

An average of over seventy schools enter the competition each year, with the first round usually beginning in late October. Each team consists of two students, and each round's motion is chosen to reflect a particular civic, social, political or even economic issue of the day. Motions for the Final have included "This House would Tax and Spend", "This House believes that the power of the United States has increased, is increasing and ought to be diminished", "This House believes that Northern Ireland badly needs 'Bog Standard' Comprehensive Schools." In the 2010 Final the motion was, "This House would welcome being part of a European Federal State." In the 2011 final, the motion was, "This House believes that Northern Ireland requires an official opposition because it has reached political maturity." The 2012 Final motion was "This House Would Welcome the Break-Up of the United Kingdom." The motion for the 2013 final was "This House believes that Europe and America are no longer fit to compete with the rise of Asia and Latin America".

In 2024, the motion was “This House believes that the voting age in all local and UK elections should be reduced to 16”.

Guest adjudicators at the final have included Michael Gove MP, Secretary of State for Education; Viscount Cranborne, now the Marquess of Salisbury and former Leader of the House of Lords; the historian, Andrew Roberts; Guy Black, Lord Black of Brentwood, Executive Director of the Telegraph Media Group; author and parliamentarian Lord Dobbs, and the journalist and leader writer of The Times, Rosemary Righter.

== Winners ==
Year	Winners	Runners-up
1993/94	Belfast Royal Academy	St. Malachy's College, Belfast
1994/95	Coleraine Academical Institution	Portadown College
1995/96	Belfast Boy's Model School	Bangor Grammar School
1996/97	Belfast Royal Academy	Omagh Academy
1997/98	St Patrick's Girls Academy, Dungannon	Royal Belfast Academical Institution
1998/99	Belfast Royal Academy	Bangor Grammar School
1999/00	Bangor Grammar School	Cambridge House Grammar School, Ballymena
2000/01	St Patrick's Grammar School, Armagh	Bangor Grammar School
2001/02	Our Lady and St. Patrick's College, Belfast	Bangor Grammar School
2002/03	Our Lady and St. Patrick's College, Belfast	Cambridge House Grammar School, Ballymena
2003/04	Bangor Grammar School	Thornhill College, Derry
2004/05	Belfast Royal Academy	Methodist College Belfast
2005/06	Our Lady and St. Patrick's College, Belfast	Coleraine Academical Institution
2006/07	Royal Belfast Academical Institution	Thornhill College, Derry
2007/08	St Marys CBGS Belfast	Antrim Grammar School
2008/09	Bangor Grammar School	Our Lady and St. Patrick's College, Belfast
2009/10	Rathmore Grammar School	Royal Belfast Academical Institution
2010/11	Royal Belfast Academical Institution	Bangor Grammar School
2011/12	Dalriada School	Bangor Grammar School
2012/13	St Columb's College, Derry	Bangor Grammar School
2013/14	St Colman's College, Newry	Royal Belfast Academical Institution
2014/15	Belfast High School	Cross and Passion College, Ballycastle
2015/16	Bangor Grammar School	Abbey Christian Brothers Grammar School
2016/17	Bangor Grammar School	Belfast Royal Academy
2017/18	Abbey Christian Brothers Grammar School	Lurgan College
2018/19	Belfast Boy's Model School	Bedford Modern School
2023/24	Belfast Royal Academy	Foyle College
2024/25	Campbell College Belfast	St. Malachy's College, Belfast

=== By School ===
Team	Won	Runner-up	Years won	Years runner-up
Bangor Grammar School	5	7	1999/00, 2003/04, 2008/09, 2015/16, 2016/17	1995/96, 1998/99, 2000/01, 2001/02, 2010/11, 2011/12, 2012/13
Belfast Royal Academy	5	1	1993/94, 1996/97, 1998/99, 2004/05, 2023/24	2016/17
Our Lady and St. Patrick's College, Belfast	3	1	2001/02, 2002/03, 2005/06	2008/09
Royal Belfast Academical Institution	2	3	2006/07, 2010/11	1997/98, 2009/10, 2013/14
Belfast Boy's Model School	2	0	1995/96, 2018/19	-
Abbey Christian Brothers Grammar School, Newry	1	1	2017/18	2015/16
Coleraine Academical Institution	1	1	1994/95	2005/06
Campbell College Belfast	1	0	2024/25	-
Belfast High School	1	0	2014/15	-
St Colman's College	1	0	2013/14	-
St Columb's College	1	0	2012/13	-
Dalriada School	1	0	2011/12	-
Rathmore Grammar School	1	0	2009/10	-
St Marys CBGS Belfast	1	0	2007/08	-
St Patrick's Grammar School, Armagh	1	0	2000/01	-
St Patrick's Girls Academy, Dungannon	1	0	1997/98	-
Thornhill College, Derry	0	2	-	2003/04, 2006/07
Cambridge House Grammar School, Ballymena	0	2	-	1999/00, 2002/03
Foyle College	0	1	-	2023/24
Cross and Passion College, Ballycastle	0	1	-	2014/15
Antrim Grammar School	0	1	-	2007/08
Methodist College Belfast	0	1	-	2004/05
Omagh Academy	0	1	-	1996/97
Portadown College	0	1	-	1994/95
St. Malachy's College, Belfast	0	1	-	1993/94
Lurgan College	0	1	-	2017/18
Bedford Modern School	0	1	-	2018/19

(When sorted by years won or lost, the table is sorted by the date of each team's first win)

== See also ==
- International university debating
  - World Universities Debating Championship
  - Australasian Intervarsity Debating Championships
  - American Parliamentary Debate Association
  - Canadian University Society for Intercollegiate Debate
  - North American Debating Championship
- International high school debating
  - World Individual Debating and Public Speaking Championship
  - World Schools Debating Championships
