= Terri Scott =

Irish academic

Terri Scott is the former principal of Northern Regional College, Northern Ireland, a position she held from 2014 to 2021.

Prior to this post, she was the first female president of Institute of Technology, Sligo (ITS), from 2008 to 2014. She was the fourth woman in history to serve as president of one of the institutes of technology in Ireland. Her academic career consists of more than two decades of work on multiple continents.

Scott is originally from Derry, Northern Ireland, where she still resides with her husband. They have three children. She was schooled at Thornhill College before progressing to the University of Ulster and Queen's University Belfast. She spent time studying economics and geography. As a postgraduate she studied informatics.

At the University of Ulster she progressed to become dean and head of the university's School of Computing and Mathematics. She has been a visiting faculty member at Carnegie Mellon University (CMU) and the Massachusetts Institute of Technology (MIT) and been involved with other universities around Europe and in Asia.

In 2000, the British Computer Society awarded her with "IT Professional of the Year", the first time a woman had achieved this honour.

Scott established the Northern Ireland Centre for Entrepreneurship, also directing it. She was managing director of Invest Northern Ireland from 2002 to 2006. She then moved on to become the founding CEO of the Ryan Academy of Entrepreneurship. As of 2010, she was a director and boardmember of IDA Ireland.

In November 2008, she became president of the Institute of Technology, Sligo.

At the ninth annual Careers' Fair on 21 January 2009, she said:

Having a degree is no longer enough. Companies will be looking for the brightest and the best. The responsibility is on the individual to have a flexible attitude and work much harder at marketing and promoting yourself.
