= Ian Fraser (surgeon) =

Irish surgeon

Sir Ian Fraser FRSE PRCSI PBMA DSO OBE LLD (1901–1999) was a Northern Irish surgeon. He served as president of the Royal College of Surgeons in Ireland in 1954-1956 and was president of the British Medical Association. In the Second World War he was responsible for the implementation of the widespread use of the newly discovered penicillin throughout military hospitals, saving tens of thousands of lives. He was described as "Northern Ireland's best-known surgeon".

He was a lifelong campaigner for the harmonisation of relationships between Northern Ireland and the Republic of Ireland.

The Sir Ian Fraser Theatre in the Royal Victoria Hospital, Belfast, his named in his honour.

== Life ==
He was born on 9 February 1901 in Belfast the son of Dr Robert Moore Fraser a Belfast GP. He was educated at the Royal Belfast Academical Institution and then studied medicine at Queen's University Belfast where he won numerous prizes before graduating in 1923. He undertook practical training at both Guy's Hospital in London and the nearby Middlesex Hospital. He then worked at the Hotel Dieu and Hospital Necker in Paris and the Allgemeines Krankenhaus in Vienna.

He worked as a Consultant Surgeon at the Royal Victoria Hospital in Belfast and the Belfast Royal Hospital for Sick Children. During a period as RSO at St Helens Hospital in Lancashire, he had to attend a major mining disaster. Thereafter he saw a huge need for widespread first-aid training. As a result, in 1932 he became the first commissioner of the St Johns Ambulance Brigade in Northern Ireland and in 1935 became its first commander.

In 1939 he was elected a Fellow of the Royal Society of Edinburgh. His proposers were William J Hamilton, Sir Frederick W Ogilvie, Thomas H Bryce and Duncan M Blair.

In the Second World War he joined the Royal Army Medical Corps. After initial service in West Africa, the War Office called upon him to begin field trials of the then-new penicillin, which was felt to be of huge benefit in cases of sepsis. In this he was personally contacted by Howard Florey and Ernst Chain, seeking his valued medical opinion. This proved enormously successful. Not only did this save many lives but it also kept a far higher proportion of troops fighting fit, playing a major role in the winning of the war. He won the Distinguished Service Order (DSO) in 1943 for his bravery during the Battle of Salerno: at Cape Passero, he left the safety of the hospital ship St David to personally retrieve wounded from the beaches. He worked without sleep for 48 hours and even donated his blood to save lives. During the D-Day landings he set up a field hospital at Arromanches. He rose to the rank of Brigadier ending his final months of the war in Agra in northern India. In India he had the duty of delivering the first consignment of dichlorodiphenyltrichloroethane, better known as DDT, to the country.

From 1952 to 1954 he was president of the Royal College of Surgeons in Ireland. In 1958 he was president of the Association of Surgeons in Great Britain and Ireland. In 1962 he was president of the British Medical Association. In 1963 he received his first knighthood. In 1964 he was president of the Queens University Association. He was chairman of the Police Authority from 1970 to 1976. As founding chairman of the Northern Ireland Police Authority and a member of the Ulster Defence Regiment advisory council, he was at least twice the subject of IRA bomb attacks.

His more unusual awards and honours include Knight of Justice and Bailiff Grand Cross. He was knighted by Queen Elizabeth II in 1979 as Knight Commander of the Order of St John. He also received multiple honorary doctorates. France created him a Chevalier de Légion d'honneur, Belgium made him Ordre de la Couronne and the Dutch made him Ordre van Oranje-Nassau.

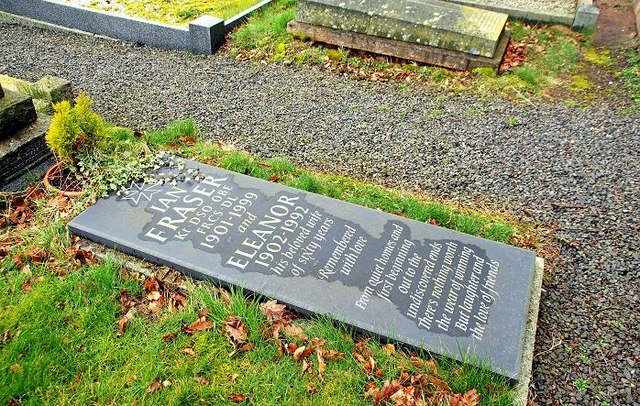
The grave of Sir Ian Fraser, St Patrick's Churchyard, Drumbeg

He died in Belfast on 11 May 1999. He is buried with his wife Eleanor Mitchell (1902-1999) at St Patrick's in Drumbeg, Northern Ireland.

== Publications ==
- Blood Sweat and Cheers (1989)
- Looking Back (1995)

== Artistic recognition ==
His portrait, by Carol Graham, hangs in the Great Hall at Queen's University, Belfast.
