= Frank Frankfort Moore =

Irish journalist, novelist, dramatist and poet

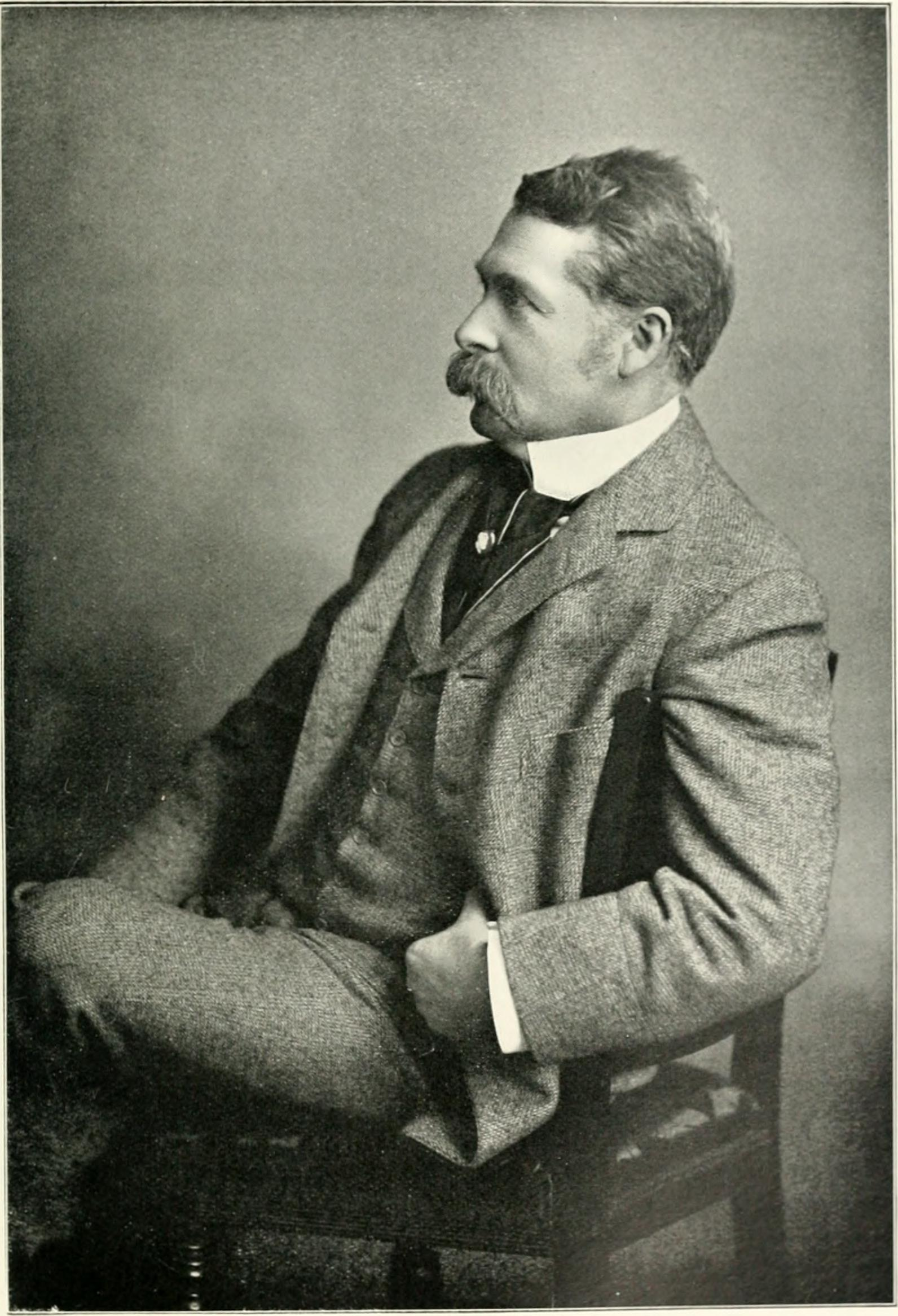

Frank Frankfort Moore (1855–1931) was an Irish journalist, novelist, dramatist, and poet. He was a Belfast Protestant and a unionist, but his historical fiction during the years of Home Rule agitation did not shy from themes of Irish-Catholic dispossession.

== Belfast years ==
Moore was born in Limerick, but was raised in Belfast where he records as his earliest memory was witnessing dragoons, sabres drawn, rushing sectarian rioters in the street below his nursery window.

Moore's father was a successful clockmaker and jeweller, and the home was relatively cultured (both French and German were spoken). However, as a member of the ultra-puritan Open Brethren sect the elder Moore sought to restrict his children's reading to religious and didactic titles. The evangelist Michael Paget Baxter, who identified the Emperor Napoleon III as the Beast of the Book of Revelation, was a regular visitor.

Moore was educated at the Royal Belfast Academical Institution where he quickly learned to distance himself from his father's beliefs. He recalled the circulation of some scurrilous verses entitled "Mr. Baxter and The Beast", "proving" that Baxter himself was the Antichrist.

In 1874 Moore hailed the declaration of scientific materialism by the Irish physicist John Tyndall at a conference of the British Science Association in Belfast and mocked the outraged reaction of local Presbyterian ministers. Moore did not disguise his disdain for the fevered evangelism of the Ulster Revival. He was to write that "if ever a mortal heard the voice of God, it would be in the garden at the cool of the day". He later took Anglican communion in the Church of Ireland.

From 1875 Moore worked for local, conservative and unionist, paper, The News Letter, but secured international assignments for a wider range of publications, including London titles. In 1878 he reported on the Berlin Congress which reconfigured the Balkans, and in 1879 (with an enthusiasm for empire) wrote despatches from South Africa on the Zulu War. He went on to travel and report from India, Burma and South America. Back in Belfast he became arts reviewer (sometimes writing with libellous invective), leader-writer and eventually assistant editor. He was described as "a compulsive writer - never revising - with an uncannily acute and retentive memory".

== Successful writer and commentator on Ulster ==
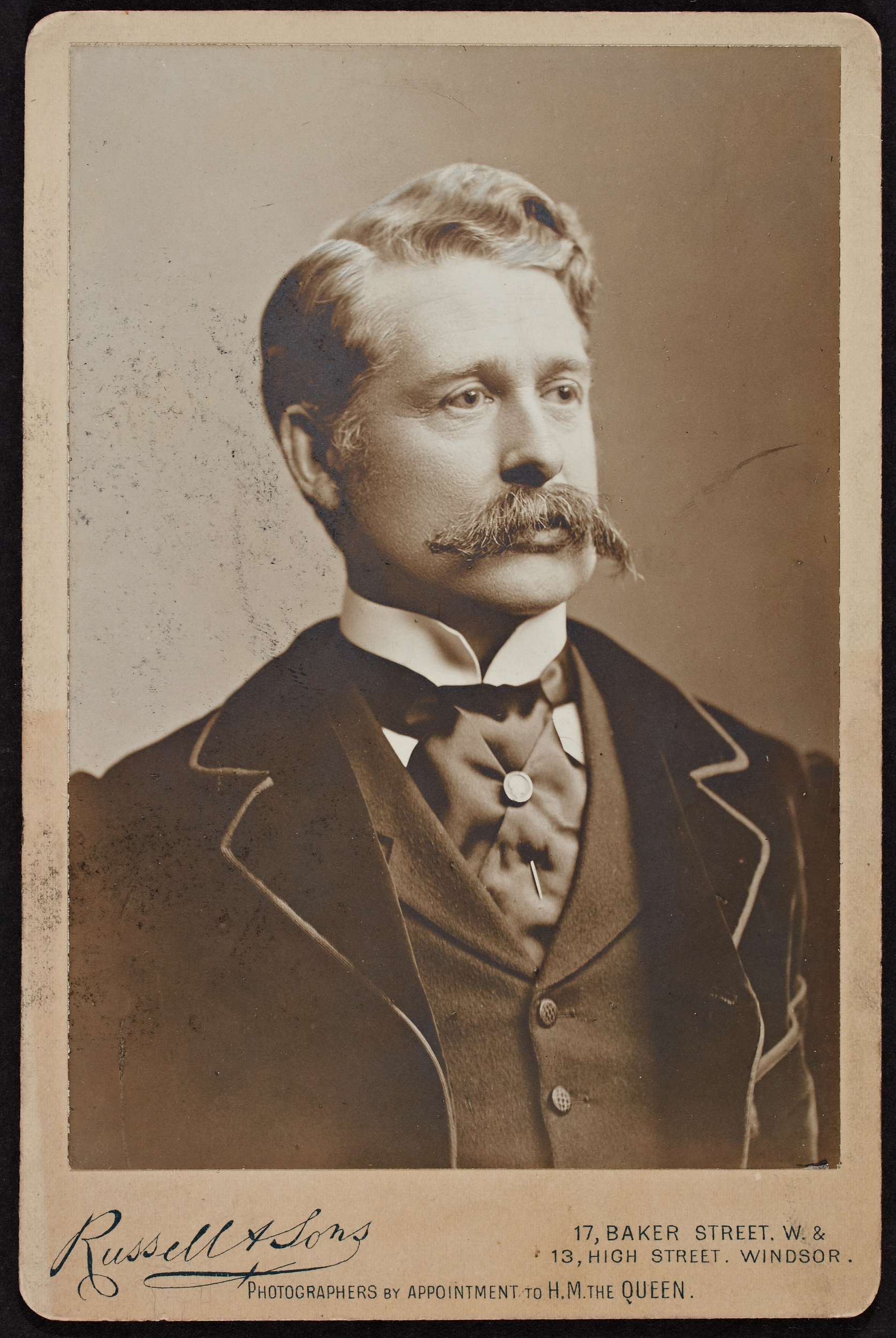
Frank Frankfort Moore carte de visite

It has been suggested that Moore's reputation in Belfast for journalistic vitriol "reflected a sense of entrapment among provincial philistines". As a schoolboy he had shown an early aptitude for poetry, publishing a volume of verse in 1872 which drew a letter of encouragement from the American poet Henry Wadsworth Longfellow. In 1875, at the age of 20, he published two further poetry collections, Flying from a shadow and Dawn, and one prose volume, Sojourners together. The first of these is an imaginary travelogue whose scope is the span of the British empire, the globe "charted by a vision tragic and romantic, much in the style of Tennyson or Wordsworth but in the rhythm of the Victorian hymnal".

Moore's 1893 novel, "I Forbid the Banns": the Story of a Comedy that was Played Seriously, was eventually to sell over half a million copies. The heroine, a young Australian women, scandalises society by operating on the principle that "if marriage is founded upon true affection, the tie will be regarded as sacred by the man and the woman without the necessity of any civil contract". Complications ensue and the experiment proves a failure.

The success of the novel gave Moore gave the confidence to launch himself a literary career--in London. He celebrated his departure from Belfast by publishing a collection of anecdotal reminiscences, A Journalist's Notebook (1894) which gave widespread offence to his former colleagues.

Moore was to publish over 80 novels. The Jessamy Bride (1897), a sentimental tale of romance between Mary Horneck and Oliver Goldsmith and involving, among other historical characters, Samuel Johnson and Edmund Burke, was a major success. He wrote several plays ranging from scenes of Goldsmith’s life to one on Nell Gwyn and including a four act verse play entitled The Mayflower (1892).

Moore was a committed unionist. “It is better", he wrote, "to be separated from the rest of Ireland than from Great Britain”. Yet in The Truth about Ulster (1914) Moore allowed that the Protestants, in important respects, remained a planted "colony" and he expressed understanding but little sympathy for their sectarian passions. In his novel The Ulsterman (1914) he has the son of a bigoted mill-owner marrying a Catholic girl. In The Lady of the Reef (1915) an English artist living in Paris travels to County Down to claim an inheritance and is baffled by the strength of local anti-Catholic feeling.

Moore also wrote novels with Irish historical themes that might have been thought more conducive to nationalist sympathies. Castle Omeragh (1903) is set in the west of Ireland during Cromwell’s ravages and its sequel Captain Latymer (1908) the Irish hero escapes transportation to Barbados with a clan daughter of the Irish chieftain Owen Roe O'Neill.

Yet Moore's ultimate sympathies were "never in doubt." In The Truth About Ulster he asserted that New York City's Tammany Hall "acted from generation to generation for the Ulstermen to point to as an example of the form of Home Rule that is the ideal of the Irishman". The ethno-Irish Democratic-Party machine was a demonstration of the corrupt practices that would be a mark an Irish parliament. On these lines Moore wrote satires of Irish Home Rule such as Diary of an Irish Cabinet Minister (1892), The Viceroy of Muldoon and The Rise and Fall of Larry O’Lannigan JP (1893), albeit in "the gentle mould of Somerville and Ross rather than the turbulent bigotry of [the unionist leaders] Carson and Craig".

Where Moore's fiction portrays Cromwell's crimes of conquest, the Lord Protector nonetheless retains the aura of "a Carlylean Great Man". His Gaels, by comparison, are "inefficient fantasists". It is suggested that Moore "feared the mass Catholicism of the western peasantry and the Belfast slums as the enemy of individual freedom and economic progress".

Moore’s wife of twenty years, Alice (Balcombe) (whose sister Florence, married to Bram Stoker, had given him access to the theatrical world.), died in 1901. He remarried to Dorothea Hatton and moved to Lewes, Sussex. Here he wrote A Garden of Peace (1919) under the pseudonym "Frank Littlemore" which celebrated "the settled order of the English countryside". He did write a series of articles on Victorian Belfast in the Belfast Telegraph in 1924, subsequently published as Belfast by the Sea (1928). While these celebrate "the achievements of late Victorian Belfast and the traders and professionals of its main streets", the Ireland that he describes in his last work, A Mixed Grill (1930), has been described as "a country best suited to the gentlemanly pursuit of hunting, now departed."

== Death and legacy ==
Moore died in Lewes in May 1931. He was survived by three daughters.

After his death several of his plays were published, and some staged at The Gaiety, Dublin and The Royal in Limerick as well as in London. He is mentioned briefly in Peter Kavanagh’s book The Irish Theatre (1946). But his fiction, some of which has been compared to the adventurous tales of Jack London, seems to have been mostly forgotten.

== Poetry ==
- Flying from a shadow (1875)
- Dawn (1875)
- The Discoverer

== Novels ==
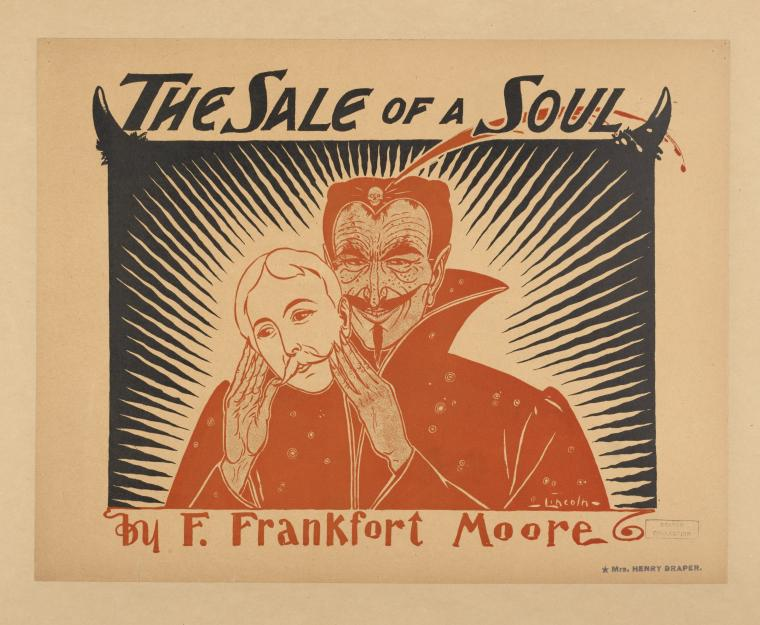
Promotional poster for The Sale of a Soul.

- Under Hatches (c. 1888, Blackie & Son)
- The Slaver of Zanzibar (1889)
- The Silver Sickle (1890)
- "I Forbid the Banns": the Story of a Comedy that was Played Seriously (1893)
- "A Gray Eye or So" (1893)
- The Two Clippers (1894)
- They Call it Love (1895)
- The Sale of a Soul (1895)
- Phyllis of Philistia (1895)
- "One Fair Daughter: Her Story" (1895)
- Highways and High Seas (c.1896, Blackie & Son), with illustrations by Alfred Pearse
- The Jessamy Bride (1896)
- The Millionaires (1898)
- "Nell Gwyn - Comedian: A Novel" (1900)
- A Nest of Linnets (1901)
- Castle Omeragh (1903)
- Love Alone is Lord (1905)
- The Artful Miss Dill (1906)
- The Love that Prevailed (1907)
- Captain Latymer (1908)
- Fanny's First Novel (1913)
- The Ulsterman (1914)
- The Lady of the Reef (1915)
- Courtship of Prince Charming (1920)
- A Garden of Peace: A Medley in Quietude (1920)
- The Hand and Dagger (1928)

== Plays ==
- A March Hare (1877)
- Moth and Flame (1878)
- The Mayflower (1892)
- Kitty Clive, Actress (1895)

== Satire ==
- Diary of an Irish Cabinet Minister (1892)
- The Viceroy of Muldoon (1893)
- The Rise and Fall of Larry O’Lannigan JP (1893)
- The Lighter Side of English Life (1914)
- A Mixed Grill (1914)

== Biography ==
- The Life of Oliver Goldsmith (1910)

== History ==
- A Georgian Pageant (1908)

== Travelogues and commentary ==
- The truth about Ulster (London : E. Nash, 1914)
- Belfast by the Sea (originally appeared as a series of 61 articles in the Belfast Telegraph, 1923-4) (1928).

== Notable Quotations ==
"He knew that to offer a man friendship when love is in his heart is like giving a loaf of bread to one who is dying of thirst." The Jessamy Bride

"I think that if ever a mortal heard the voice of God, it would be in a garden at the cool of the day." A Garden of Peace
