= Guardian (sculpture) =

Statue in Wales, United Kingdom

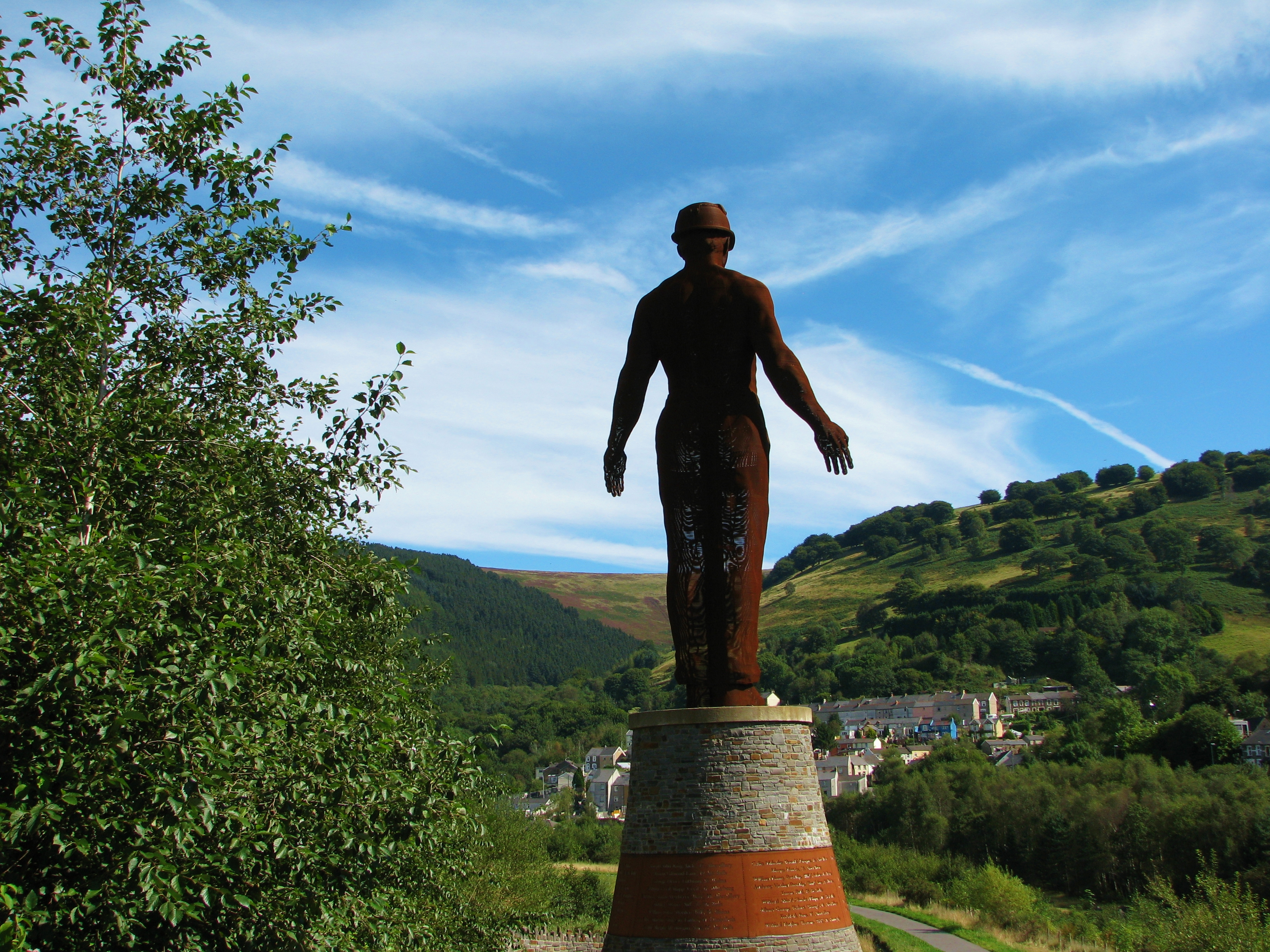
- Guardian overlooking Parc Arael Griffin
- Artist: Sebastien Boyesen
- Year: 2010
- Type: Statue
- Medium: Steel
- Dimensions: 20 m (66 ft)
- Location: Abertillery, Wales, United Kingdom; 51.718143°N 3.133275°W

The Guardian is a 20 m (66 ft) tall statue overlooking Parc Arael Griffin, the landscaped former Six Bells Colliery site, in the South Wales mining town of Abertillery, Blaenau Gwent. It was designed and created by artist Sebastien Boyesen.

== Background ==
On 28 June 1960, an underground explosion at the then Six Bells Colliery killed 45 miners. Caused by an ignition of firedamp, coal-dust in the air ignited and the explosion spread almost throughout a district of the mine, killing 45 out of the 48 men who worked there. The sculpture commemorates those events and is dedicated to all mining communities wherever they may be.

== Construction and moiré effect ==
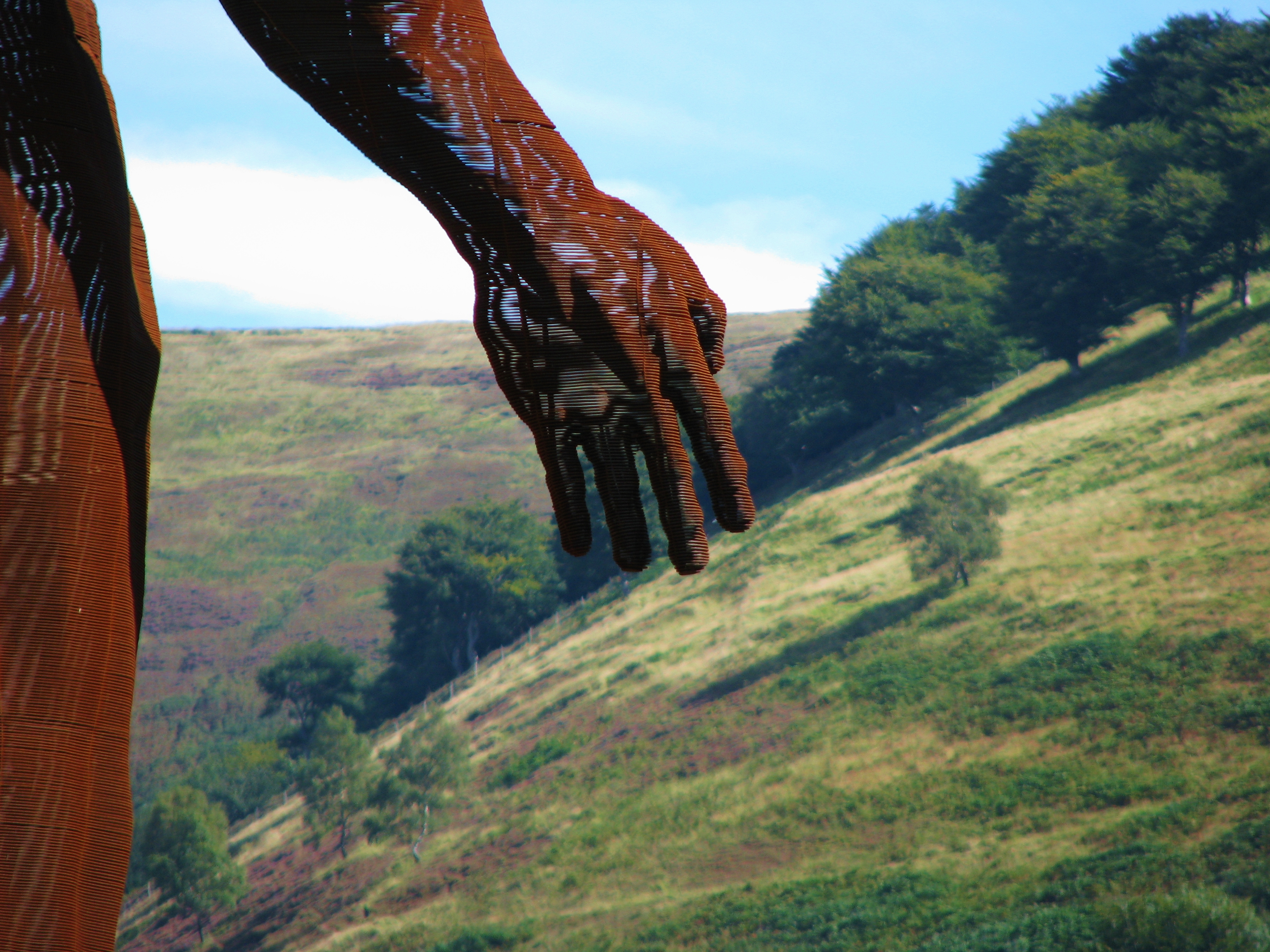
The moiré effect seen on hand and forearm

Costing in excess of £200,000, Guardian is made from over 20,000 horizontal strips of a special 10 mm (0.4 in) thick COR-TEN weathering steel, which allows a protective rust patina to form on its surface. Each strip is separated from but connected to the next so that, from a distance, The Guardian appears almost transparent. Close up and from the appropriate angle, the gaps between the strips disappear to give the appearance of a solid sculpture with full definition of all of its features. This style of construction creates a moiré effect where the steel sections appear to move or shimmer in the light. The statue itself is 12.6 m (41 ft) tall, weighs around eight tonnes and stands on a sandstone plinth 7.4 m (24 ft) tall. It has been compared to Sir Antony Gormley's Angel of the North.

== Unveiling ==
Exactly fifty years after the explosion, 28 June 2010, the statue was unveiled at a commemorative service led by the Archbishop of Canterbury, Rowan Williams. Around four hundred relatives were among 7,500 people from across the world attending the service. The names, ages and home town of each of the 45 victims appear on steel plates surrounding the plinth. In November 2011, Prince Charles visited the statue and the nearby visitor centre.
