= Thornhill College =

Coordinates: 55.035°N 7.284°W

- Coláiste Chnoc na nDealg

Location
- Culmore Road; Derry, BT48 8JF; Northern Ireland

Information
- Type: Grammar school
- Motto: Adveniat Regnum Tuum (Thy Kingdom come)
- Religious affiliation: Roman Catholic
- Established: 1886
- Local authority: Education Authority (Western)
- Principal: Sharon Mallett, BSSc PGDFHE MSc PQM
- Staff: 100
- Grades: 6-12
- Gender: Girls
- Age: 11 to 18
- Enrolment: 1409
- Colour
- Website: www.thornhillcollege.org.uk

Thornhill College is a Roman Catholic grammar school for girls. Located in Derry, Northern Ireland, it has a student population of approximately 1500 and a staff of 100 teachers.

== History ==
The nucleus of the present Thornhill College commenced shortly after the Sisters of Mercy came to Derry in 1848. The Sisters started a private school for girls in Pump Street. The school started in Artillery Street, Derry in 1887 as the Ard Scoil na Maighdine Mhuire - Convent of Our Lady of Mercy School. Its first Scheme of Government under the Ministry of Education was drawn up in February 1925. When Watt's Distillery closed in Derry, and the Estate at Thornhill, on the outskirts of Derry, became available for sale, the Sisters, with the kind assistance of Robert Boyle, a builder in Derry, completed the purchase of the property in 1929. The house was adapted to the needs of the nuns and of the boarders. The Sisters involved moved to Thornhill Convent along with the boarders, and the Convent of Our Lady of Mercy School was officially transferred and opened on 8 September 1932 with an intake of 120 pupils, and a staff of about seven Sisters and three lay teachers.

After the Education Act, Northern Ireland in 1947, the number of pupils had increased rapidly as grammar school education became available to more and more children through the eleven plus examination. The school also had a change of name to Thornhill College, Convent of Mercy Voluntary Maintained Grammar School and various new buildings completed but these were insufficient. After many years of much effort, the present building was approved and opened in 2002 across the road from the old site in the new Thornhill College. At that time, the Sisters of Mercy withdrew from trusteeship, and gave it over to the Bishop and the Diocese of Derry.

== Motto ==
The school motto is the Latin phrase "Adveniat Regnum Tuum", which translates as "Thy Kingdom come".

== Academics ==
In 2009, Thornhill College became a Specialist School in Mathematics and Physics.

In 2018, Thornhill College was ranked 17th out of 192 schools in Northern Ireland in terms of its A-level performance. A total of 84.3% of its students entered for A-Levels achieved a grade of A* – C.

In 2018, 97.4% of its entrants achieved five or more GCSEs at grades A* to C, including the core subjects English and Maths and the college was ranked 28th out of 191 schools in Northern Ireland.

In 2017, the college took first place in the Northern Ireland Schools' Analyst Competition which is organised by the local Analytical Division of the Royal Society of Chemistry and involved 12 schools from across Northern Ireland.

== Debating ==
Thornhill College has a Senior Debating Society, established in 1954. The team were runners-up in the final of the Northern Ireland Schools Debating Competition in 2007, and is known throughout the school for wearing the gold stripe around the lapel of the debating blazer. Thornhill had two teams in the semi-finals of this competition who debated against each other on 30 March 2007 in Belfast. In 2017, the society had two teams in the final of the Queen's Literific Society Debating Competition one of which was the outright winner. The society meets regularly to debate topical subjects and research up and coming competitions. The school also has an established Junior Debating Society who meet after school as part of the homework club. A member from the senior debating society made the national debating team and competed in the 2018 and 2019 World Schools Competition.

== Music ==
The college has a very active choir. In 2018, it won the School Choir of the Year at the International Choral Festival in Derry. The following year it won the BBC Northern Ireland School Choir of the Year.

== Notable former pupils ==
Name	Born	Died	Activities
Sheila McClean	1932	2011	artist
Nell McCafferty	1944	2024	journalist, writer and playwright
Dana Rosemary Scallon	1951		singer - winner of 1970 Eurovision Song Contest; politician - elected as Member of the European Parliament from 1999 to 2004 for Connacht–Ulster
Roma Downey	1960		actress
Terri Scott	1961		educator
Colette Bryce	1970		poet
Lisa McGee	1980		creator of TV show Derry Girls, set in a fictionalised version of Thornhill College
Sinead McLaughlin			SDLP politician; Member of the Northern Ireland Assembly (MLA) for Foyle 2020–2022
Elisha McCallion	1982		Sinn Féin politician; Mayor of Derry from 2015 to 2016
Nadine Coyle	1985		member of girlband Girls Aloud
Avilla Bergin	1991		association football player
