= Chris Hill (photographer) =

Irish photographer

Christopher Rowden Hill (born 25 December 1946) is a photographer from Belfast, Northern Ireland.

== Early life ==
Born on 25 December 1946, he was the second child to parents Verner and Margaret Hill. He has two brothers, Eric and Charles and one sister, Elizabeth.

Although training to go into the family's clothing business, he developed an early passion for photography at the age of 14, often taking photographs of bands at school dances and selling prints to his friends the next day.

He once photographed The Beatles and sold the pictures around the local schools, making himself "a small fortune"

He was educated at the Royal Belfast Academical Institution Prep school Inchmarlo and then RBAI itself.

Upon leaving school he became a member of the Old Boy association Instonians and a regular player for their rugby team up until his mid-thirties.

== Career ==
In 1978 he left the family firm to set up Christopher Hill Photographic, specialising in sports and theatre photography, and later all aspects of commercial photography including advertising, fashion, still life and architectural.

Winning several awards boosted his career, including Sports Photograph of the Year 1977 & 1978, from the Sports Council of Northern Ireland

Hill became known as a highly accomplished landscape photographer, regularly shooting assignments for the National Trust and the Northern Ireland Tourist Board.

Over the years, Hill has shot many Irish landscapes, with which he started one of Ireland's leading photographic libraries: Scenic Ireland.

The library, the largest independent photographic library in Ireland, now contains over 13,000 images of Irish landscapes and cityscapes.

In December, 2008 with designer Colin McCadden he launched the first in his book series entitled "Scenic Ireland," covering the province of Ulster.
