= St Illtyd's Church, Llanhilleth =

St Illtyd's Church
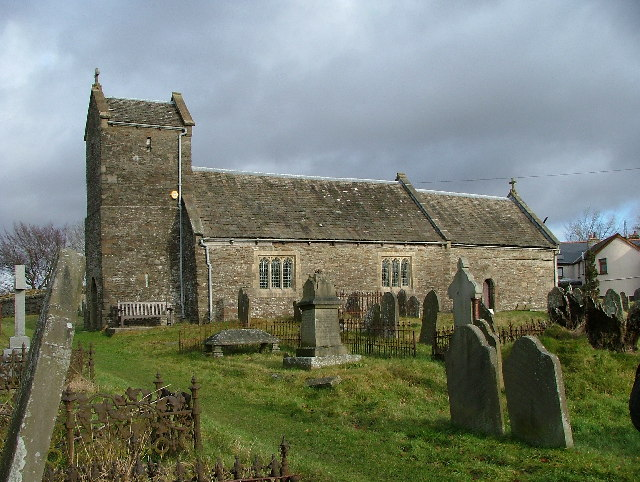

- Location within Blaenau Gwent
- 51.7109°N 3.1333°W
- Type: Church
- Location: Blaenau Gwent, Wales
- OS grid reference: SO 2179 0196

History
- Built: c. 1500

Listed Building – Grade II*
- Official name: St Illtyd's Church
- Designated: 6 June 1962
- Reference no.: 1866
- Community: Llanhilleth

St Illtyd's Church is a deconsecrated church in Llanhilleth, Blaenau Gwent, Wales. A Grade II* listed building, it is the oldest standing building in the county borough.

The use of the site for worship dates back to pre-Norman times, with references to the church in a poem written in the 9th or 10th century. The church was probably rebuilt by the Cistercians in the late 12th century. Much of what remains (particularly the saddleback west tower and the barrel roofs) suggests more rebuilding around 1500. Further refurbishment was completed in 1888–91.

The church closed for the first time in the 1930s because of subsidence from nearby coalmining. It was repaired and reopened in 1943, before closing again because of open cast mining in 1957. After the open cast operations ended in 1962, the church was found to have deteriorated further and was closed permanently.

The church was sold into private hands after closure. It was eventually acquired by Blaenau Gwent Borough Council in 1984 and has been restored to a safe condition. It is open to visitors and is sometimes used as a venue for community events.
