= Chris Hill (tennis) =

Welsh tennis player and coach

Christopher Charles Samuel Hill is a veteran tennis player and professional tennis coach based in South Wales.

== Personal life ==
Born in 1957 in Abertillery, Monmouthshire, Hill still lived in the area as of 2015. Hill is a strong advocate of tennis and the personal, social and sporting benefits associated with the game.

== Playing career ==
Hill started tennis at a very early age at his local “Six Bells” tennis club and was trained by Bob Wallace, the former Secretary of the Welsh Lawn Tennis Association (LTA).

His playing career continued in much the same vein through senior tournaments. He was a multiple Welsh Doubles Championship finalist, a Wales international player and captained his county side.

By 2015 he had been a Wimbledon Champion and achieved over 75 Wales and Great Britain title wins.

== Coaching career ==
Hill’s first venture into coaching came at just 16. It continued for more than 30 years on a part-time basis alongside full-time employment in the steel industry. Redundancy gave him the freedom to take up professional coaching.

In 2011, Hill was shortlisted by “Tennis Wales” for Welsh Tennis Coach of the year. That same year he coached Special Olympics tennis player Shain Lewis who went on to win two bronze medals at Athens. Lewis was selected from the competing 6000 athletes to give the closing ceremony speech.
