= Jabberwocky (disambiguation) =

"Jabberwocky" is an 1872 nonsense poem by Lewis Carroll, about an encounter between a young boy and a monster called the Jabberwock.

Jabberwocky or Jabberwock may also refer to:

== Books ==
- Jabberwocky, 2004 book by Lewis Carroll and Stéphane Jorisch

== Films and television ==
- Jabberwocky (1971 film), directed by Jan Švankmajer
- Jabberwocky (1977 film), directed by Terry Gilliam
- Jabberwocky (TV series) (1972–1974), American children's television series
- "Jabberwocky" (Better Off Ted), an episode of the TV series Better Off Ted
- Jabberwock, 2010 television movie directed by Steven R. Monroe

== Games ==
- Jabberwocky, a character in the 2000 computer game American McGee's Alice
- Jabberwock Island, the setting of the video game Danganronpa 2: Goodbye Despair
- Jabberwocky I and II, chapters of the visual novel Wonderful Everyday

== Music ==
- The Jabberwock (club), a nightclub in Berkeley, California, U.S.
- Jabberwocks, a cappella group at Brown University, Providence, Rhode Island, U.S.
- Jabberwocky (album), by Clive Nolan and Oliver Wakeman
- Jabberwocky (band), French electro-pop band
- Jabberwocky (musical), by Andrew Kay, Malcolm Middleton and Peter Phillips
- Jabberwocky, an unreleased Jani Lane album
- "Jabberwocky", a song by Omnia on the album Wolf Love (2010)

== Publications ==
- Jabberwock (magazine), published in London by Chapman & Hall and edited by Brenda Girvin
- Jabberwock Review, a literary journal
- The Jabberwock, the student newspaper of Boston Latin Academy

== Software ==
- Jabberwacky, a chatbot created by Rollo Carpenter, winner of the 2005 and 2006 Loebner prizes
- Jabberwock, a chatbot created by Juergen Pirner, winner of the 2003 Loebner Prize

== Other media and entertainment ==
- Jabbawockeez, a dance group
- Jabberwock (play), a 1972 play by Jerome Lawrence and Robert Edwin Lee

== Other uses ==
- 7470 Jabberwock, a minor planet
- Jabberwocky Graphix, media company owned by American artist Brad W. Foster

== See also ==
- Jabberwocky sentence, a type of sentence of interest in neurolinguistics
- "Mimsy Were the Borogoves", 1943 science fiction story by Lewis Padgett
- Beamish (disambiguation)
- Wabe (disambiguation)
- Vorpal (disambiguation)
- Tumtum (disambiguation)
