= Beamish =

Beamish may refer to:

== People ==
- Alfred Beamish (1879–1944), English tennis player
- Charles Beamish (1908–1984), Irish rugby player and RAF pilot
- David Beamish (born 1952), British public servant
- Emma Beamish (born 1982), Irish cricketer
- Francis Beamish (1802–1868), Irish Whig and Liberal politician
- Geordie Beamish (born 1996), New Zealand athlete
- George Beamish (1905–1967), British air marshal and Irish rugby player
- Geraldine Beamish (1883–1972), English tennis player
- Harold Beamish (1896–1986), New Zealand flying ace of World War I
- Henry Hamilton Beamish (1873–1948), British antisemitic journalist and Rhodesian politician
- Kevan Jones, Baron Beamish (born 1964), British Labour politician
- Olive Beamish (1890–1978), Irish-born suffragette
- Richard J. Beamish (1869–1945), Pennsylvania lawyer, journalist, author and public official
- Robert Beamish (1916–2001), Canadian physician and cardiologist
- Sally Beamish (born 1956), British composer
- Tufton Beamish (Royal Navy officer) (1874–1951), rear admiral in the Royal Navy and member of Parliament for Lewes
- Tufton Beamish, Baron Chelwood (1917–1989), son of the above; British Army officer and member of Parliament for Lewes
- Victor Beamish (1903–1942), RAF fighter pilot
- Beamish Murdoch (1800–1876), Canadian lawyer, historian and political figure in Nova Scotia

== Fictional characters ==
- Chet Beamish, from the television series The Big Valley
- Dr. Beamish, from the film Dracula's Daughter
- Leonard Beamish, from the film Carry On Regardless
- Bert Beamish, Mrs. Beamish and Major Beamish, in The Ickabog, a fairy tale by J. K. Rowling
- Wendy Beamish, from the film St. Elmo's Fire
- the protagonist of The Adventures of Willy Beamish, a 1991 computer game

== Places ==
- Beamish, County Durham, a village in England
  - Beamish Museum, an open-air museum
- Beamish Hall, a mid-18th-century country house near the town of Stanley, County Durham

== Other uses ==
- Beamish, a nonsense word from the 1872 poem "Jabberwocky" by Lewis Carroll
- Beamish Stout, an Irish stout formerly brewed by Beamish and Crawford
