= Tumtum =

Tumtum or Tum Tum may refer to:

- Tumtum language, a Kadu language spoken in Kordofan
- Tumtum (Judaism), a Talmudic gender concept for certain intersex people
- Tumtum Tree, a fictional tree mentioned in the poem "Jabberwocky" by Lewis Carroll
- Tumtum and Nutmeg, the first of a series of children's books by author Emily Bearn
- Lourawls Nairn Jr. (born 1994), a Bahamian basketball player
- Tum Tum, a boy ninja character from the 3 Ninjas film series

== Places ==
- Tumtum, Washington, a community in Stevens County, Washington, US
- Tumtum Lake, a small lake located in the Upper Adams River valley in the Interior of British Columbia, Canada
- Tumtum Peak, a summit in Mount Rainier National Park
- Tumtum River, a river in the U.S. state of Oregon

== See also ==
- Tummy, an informal word for the human abdomen or stomach
- Tum (disambiguation)
- Jabberwocky (disambiguation)
