= Nick Price (disambiguation) =

Nick Price (born 1957) is a Zimbabwean professional golfer.

Nick or Nicholas Price may also refer to:

- Nick Price (illustrator), British illustrator of The Wombles, Tumtum and Nutmeg, and Doctor Snuggles
- Nick Price (actor), appearing in the Three Investigators film series
- Nicholas Price (born 1983), backing drummer for Meg & Dia
- Nicholas A. Price (born 1962), visual artist

== See also ==
- Michael Price (disambiguation) (aka Mick Price)
