= Tum =

Tum or TUM can refer to:

== Education ==
- Technical University of Munich (German: Technische Universität München)
  - TUM Institute for Advanced Study
  - TUM Asia
- Technological University (Mandalay)
- The University of Manila

== Places ==
- Tum, Poland; a village
  - Tum Collegiate Church
- Tum, Ethiopia; a village in the Maji District near Tum Airport
- Tumut Airport, IATA airport code "TUM"
- Tumbes Region, Peru, ISO 3166-2 code PE-TUM, shortened to TUM
- Tuen Mun station, Hong Kong; MTR station code TUM

== People ==
- Tecla Tum, Kenyan politician
- Stephanie Tum (born 1987), Cameroonian actress
- Tum Saray (born 1992), Cambodian soccer player
- Rigoberta Menchú Tum, (born 1959), an indigenous Guatemalan and 1992 Nobel Peace Prize laureate
- Mehmet Tüm (born 1957), Turkish politician
- Hervé Tum (born 1979), Cameroonian soccer player
- Gerard Tum (1040–1120), founder of the Order of St John of Jerusalem (the Knights Hospitaller)

== Other uses ==
- The human stomach or abdomen
- Totally Unimodular Matrix, in mathematics
- Tumbuka language, of several Bantu peoples (ISO 639-2 and 639-3 language code tum)
- Tum, aka Toum, a variety of the Phong language cluster
- Tum: A Dangerous Obsession, 2004 Hindi film
- Tum: My Pledge of Love, 2011 Philippine film
- Truck Utility Medium, British Army designation for the long wheelbase variant of the Land Rover Wolf

== See also ==
- Atum, an Egyptian god
- Tums (disambiguation)
- Tumtum (disambiguation), including tum tum
