= Don College =

School in Devonport, Tasmania, Australia

Location
- Devonport, North-western Tasmania; Australia; 41°10′03″S 146°20′00″E

Information
- Type: Government, comprehensive senior college
- Established: February 1976; 50 years ago
- Educational authority: Department for Education, Children and Young People
- Oversight: Office of Tasmanian Assessment, Standards & Certification
- Principal: John Thompson
- Teaching staff: 54.1 FTE (2022)
- Years: 10–12
- Enrolment: 777 (2023)
- Campus type: Regional
- Website: doncollege.education.tas.edu.au

Don College is a government comprehensive senior secondary school located in Devonport on the north-western coast of Tasmania. "The Don", as it is commonly known to residents of Devonport, is situated by the Don River and enjoys views of the river and surrounding forest reserve. The college caters to approximately 800 students in Years 10, 11 and 12 and is administered by the Department for Education, Children and Young People. Don College attracts students from Penguin and Deloraine.

In 2023, student enrolments were 777. The principal, since 2010, is John Thompson.

== History ==
Don College, originally Devonport Matriculation College, commenced in temporary classrooms behind Devonport High School, while the college buildings were in construction. Students moved into the new buildings beside the Don River in February 1976 and the college was officially opened as a Senior Secondary College delivering the Grade 10/11/12 curriculum by Neil Batt, Minister For Education, in November of that year. The Don College, designed by architect John Gott, is an excellent example of brutalist architecture. Its scale makes it one of the largest examples of the style in Devonport. The site was covered with Melaleuca, also known locally as paper bark, which was used to construct the boxing for the concrete in the buildings. This left a distinctive texture on the concrete, a connection with the natural environment surrounding the college.

The first principal of the Don College was Thomas Bailey. Bailey was renowned for his progressive view of education.

"(Tom) [Bailey] had been frustrated by the petty rules of high schools, which he felt existed more to reinforce the authority of teachers than to benefit students"

Bailey did not see a school as a place where students were controlled. He believed that students should be guided and given a safe place to make mistakes.

During the late 1970s the Tasmanian Government developed proposals to amalgamate secondary colleges with the technical colleges (TAFE) and Adult Education to form Community Colleges. This proposal resonated with Bailey's vision of providing further education to a wider section of the community, the lost "60%". In 1980 The Don College combined with the Devonport Technical College and Mersey-Leven Adult Education to become the Devon Community College. The new college was managed by a board consisting of the principals of the three component institutions. The community college concept failed to gain wide enough support and a change of government finally saw the Devon Community College disbanded back to its component parts in 1982.

Bailey retired in 1991, and in 1992 John Lee-Archer took over as principal. At this time public education in Tasmania commenced a period of rapid and significant change. It fell to Lee-Archer to carry the college through this. Lee-Archer's style of leadership has been described as more traditional hierarchical than Bailey's. Certainly Lee-Archer needed to run a tighter ship and reign in the freedom that Bailey had allowed staff. Changes were coming which would require all staff to work as a tighter team and work towards collective goals rather than individual ones.

In 1992 the Tasmanian Certificate of Education was introduced to Years 10, 11 and 12. This involved the introduction of an entirely new curriculum.

Seeing the need to provide for a wider range of students Lee-Archer began to plan for the introduction of Australian Vocational Training Scheme (AVTS) courses. These were nationally accredited courses in vocational areas such as retail and trades. Through 1995 - 1997 these courses gradually grew. Don College was no longer simply a place to prepare for tertiary study. Another significant change that Lee-Archer had to accommodate was the introduction in the early 1990s of a new Tasmanian Department of Education Staffing Policy. Under this policy staff appointments were reviewed every five years. Staff working in isolated or 'difficult to staff' schools were assured that requests for transfer would be approved at review time. This coincided with an increase in college teaching load implemented as part of the state government response to the Cresap Report (1990). The result was a period of rapid staff changes in a college which until then had enjoyed a high degree of stability.

In 2004-5 the secondary curriculum framework was developed in collaboration with all government and non-government schools. By the end of 2005 Tasmania had, for the first time ever, an inclusive, values based framework for senior secondary education with clearly articulated purposes and outcomes. Lee-Archer was seconded to work on this project and Don College was a leader in its implementation on his return in 2006. Lee-Archer left the college in 2008 to take a senior position in the new Tasmanian Academy.

Once again Don College faced significant structural change with new and untried leadership when in 2009 the Tasmanian government restructured secondary colleges and the Don College became known as the Don Campus of the Tasmanian Polytechnic which delivered vocational (VET) courses, and the Don Campus of the Tasmanian Academy which delivered TCE courses. The staff on site were divided into 'Polytechnic' and 'Academy'. There were also staff movements as some staff were exchanged with the other Polytechnic campus in Valley Road Devonport. (previously known as the TAFE College).

There were now two separate administrative structures in place, with John Thompson appointed as acting principal of the Tasmanian Academy (Don Campus) and Michelle Best appointed as campus leader for the Polytechnic (Don Campus). After two years it was judged that this model, with two institutions on one campus, had not worked. The college was restructured back to a single college and renamed Don College, with Thompson as the principal. Don has, however, continued to offer vocational certificate courses.

Thompson was made permanent principal in 2010, and once the college had settled back to a single institution in 2011 his challenge was to rebuild and sustain the college ethos in a college which is much larger and more diverse than the one Bailey knew. Changing government policy on education has also continued to provide a turbulent leadership environment.

In March 2016 the Minister for Education announced that secondary schools in the Devonport area would offer Years 10, 11 and 12 courses from 2017. This announcement ended Don College's monopoly on state funded senior secondary education in Devonport.

=== Principals ===
Ordinal	Principal	Name of institution / structure	Start date	End date	Time in office	Notes
1	Thomas Bailey	Don College	February 1976	1980	14–15 years	
1	Thomas Bailey	Devon Community College	1980	1982	14–15 years	
1	Thomas Bailey	Don College	1982	1991	14–15 years	
2	John Lee-Archer	Don College	1992	2008	15–16 years	
3	John Thompson	Don Campus of the Tasmanian Academy	2009	2010	16–17 years	
3	John Thompson	Don College	2010	incumbent	16–17 years	

== Subjects ==
The subjects taught at Don College fall within either the curriculum of the Office of Tasmanian Assessment, Standards & Certification (TASC), or Australian Vocational Education and Training (VET).

TASC courses available at the college include Visual Arts, Performing Arts, Science, Mathematics, Languages, Media Production, Humanities, and many more. Upon successful completion of the equivalent of eight TASC subjects, including literacy, numeracy and ICT, students are awarded the Tasmanian Certificate of Education.

VET subjects include hospitality, automotive, animal studies, hair and beauty, retail etc. Students completing these courses receive the relevant certificate or statement of attainment.

There are no compulsory subjects, although students are encouraged to enroll in a literacy and a numeracy subject to satisfy the requirements of the Tasmanian Certificate of Education. All students are also required to attend Career and Life Planning classes, which cover a range of topics such as study skills, ICT skills, career planning, further education opportunities, etc.

A full-time course consists of four TASC subjects per year, or one VET subject and two TASC subjects per year.

Don College also has a transition education program for students with learning disabilities. This focuses on life skills and independence.

== Facilities ==
- A Block is the administration block with the main office as well as the lockers. It connects B and E blocks
- B Block contains Science, computer labs, Mathematics and Languages
- C Block contains MDT, Graphic Design, Media and Computer Science
- D Block contains the visual arts
- E Block contains the library, the common rooms and music
- MPC contains the Gym, weight training room, Drama and Dance
- Terrapins (prefabricated classrooms) contains English, transition education and health

== Timetable ==
Classes commence at 8:35 am and finish at 3:20 pm. The day consists of 4 teaching blocks of approximately 90 minutes. Students on a full load will attend 12 - 14 lessons each week. The remaining time is set aside for free study and tutorials.

== Productions ==
The Don College has a tradition of biennial musical productions, some of which include:

Year	Production	Notes
1981	Jabberwocky	
1985	Bye Bye Birdie	
1987	Joseph and the Amazing Technicolor Dreamcoat	
1989	Grease	
1991	Little Shop of Horrors	
1993	Man of Steel	
1995	Godspell	
1997	Hair	
1999	Pippin	
2001	Children of Eden	
2003	Carousel	
2005	Oliver!	
2007	Joseph and the Amazing Technicolor Dreamcoat	
2009	Eurobeat: Almost Eurovision	
2011	Guys and Dolls	
2013	RENT (School Edition)	
2015	Seussical	
2017	Shrek (School Edition)	
2019	Legally Blonde (School Edition)	
2021	Mary Poppins The Broadway Musical	
2023	School of Rock: The Musical	
2025	Roald Dahl's Charlie and the Chocolate Factory	

== Notable alumni ==
- Peter Binks, Rhodes Scholar 1983 – St John's
- Michael Gaffney, politician
- Tim Monks, Rhodes Scholar 1982 – St John's
- Matthew Richardson, former Australian rules football player
- Prema Smith, actor, director
- Sharifah Zaliah Syed Rohan, former Tasmania University Student Association President
- Alex Fuller, Former National Director Australian Youth Climate Coalition
- Rodney Croome, gay rights activist
