= Beamish brothers =

Irish fraternal sportsmen

The Beamish brothers were a family of four Irish brothers, Victor (1903–42), George (1905–67), Charles (1908–84) and Cecil (1915–99), who were all accomplished sportsmen - George and Charles played international rugby for Ireland, and Victor and Cecil played top-level club rugby for Leicester, Harlequins and London Irish - they were also quite good at golf - and all served as RAF officers during the Second World War, wherein Victor was killed on active service, and George and Cecil reached air ranks after the war. They were the sons of Frank George Beamish.
