= Colerain High School =

Colerain High School may refer to:

- Colerain High School in Cincinnati, Ohio, United States
- Colerain High School in Colerain, North Carolina, United States

It is not to be confused with Coleraine High School, Coleraine, County Londonderry, Northern Ireland.
