= Beautiful Soup =

Beautiful Soup may refer to:

- "Beautiful Soup", a song in the 1865 novel Alice's Adventures in Wonderland by Lewis Carroll
- "Beautiful Soup", a 1992 dystopian satire by Harvey Jacobs
- "Beautiful Soup", a 2014 work by Australian composer Leon Coward
- Beautiful Soup (HTML parser), an HTML parser written in the Python programming language

== See also ==
- Boeing Duveen and The Beautiful Soup, a British psychedelic rock band of the 1960s
- Soup, Beautiful Soup and South American Kitchen, a book by Felipe Rojas-Lombardi
