= Coleraine Academical Institution =

Voluntary grammar school in County Londonderry, Northern Ireland

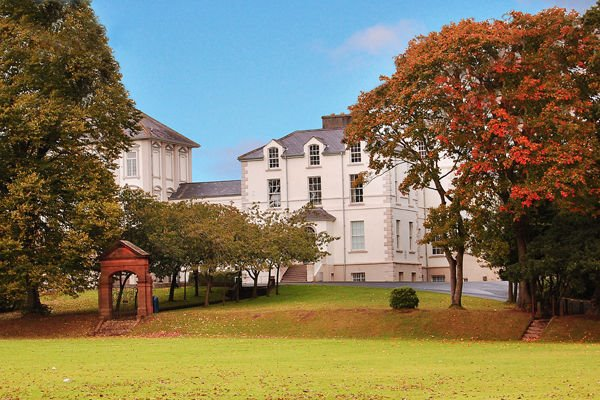

Location
- Castlerock Road; Coleraine, County Londonderry, BT51 3LA; Northern Ireland; 55.136°N 6.686°W

Information
- Type: Voluntary grammar school
- Motto: Εως Hμερα Εστιη (Work while it is day)
- Established: 1860
- Closed: 2015
- Local authority: NEELB
- Gender: Boys
- Age range: 11–19
- Enrolment: c. 750
- Campus size: 70-acre (28 ha)
- Houses: White; Hunter; Houston; Clarke; Henry
- Colours: Maroon, White and Navy
- Publication: The Inst
- Affiliation: Headmasters' and Headmistresses' Conference
- Alumni: Coleraine Old Boys
- Website: www.coleraineai.com/museum/

Coleraine Academical Institution (CAI and styled locally as Coleraine Inst) was a voluntary grammar school for boys in Coleraine, County Londonderry, Northern Ireland. Originally founded in 1860, the school merged with Coleraine High School in 2015 to become Coleraine Grammar School.

== History ==
Coleraine Academical Institution occupied a 70-acre (28 ha) site on the Castlerock Road, where it was founded in 1860. It was, for many years, a boarding school until the boarding department closed in 1999. It was one of eight Northern Irish schools represented on the Headmasters' and Headmistresses' Conference (HMC). As of 2012, the school had an enrolment of 778 pupils, aged 11–19.

The school has extensive sporting facilities, including 33-acre (13 ha) playing fields, indoor swimming pool, boathouse, rugby pavilion, sports pavilion and gymnasium. Coleraine Inst was nine times winner of the Ulster Schools Cup, the world's second-oldest rugby competition, in which it competed every year since 1876. The school has a past pupil organisation, "The Coleraine Old Boys' Association", which has several branches globally.

The school origins and land are tied to the Worshipful Company of Clothworkers, one of the Livery Companies making up the City of London Corporation.

As part of a general re-organisation of schools in the Coleraine area over a number of years, Coleraine Academical Institution was merged in September 2015 with Coleraine High School on Coleraine's Lodge Road and became a fully boys' and girls' grammar school called Coleraine Grammar School.

== Headmasters ==
The school's former headmasters include:

- (1860–1870) Alex Waugh Young, CAI's founding principal.
- (1870–1915) Thomas Galway Houston served the school for 45 years and had a long retirement in Portstewart until his death in 1939 at the age of 96. Houston served as a member of the senate in the Stormont Parliament for Queen's University, Belfast.
- (1915–1927) Thomas James Beare, known as "Tommy John", had a shorter tenure in office, until his premature retirement on health grounds in 1927.
- (1927–1955) William White, commonly known as "The Chief"
- (1955–1979) George Humphreys, by whom the major physical expansion of the school was guided. Previously on the staff at Campbell College, Belfast, it was during his headmastership that Inst became an H.M.C. school.
- (1979–1984) Robert F. J. Rodgers, former headmaster of Bangor Grammar School, was headmaster of Inst until his appointment as principal of Stranmillis Training College, Belfast.
- (1984–2003) R. Stanley Forsythe was appointed following a period as headmaster of The Royal School, Dungannon and remained in post until retirement.
- (2004–2007) Leonard F. Quigg was the first headmaster in the school's history to have been promoted "from within the ranks". Quigg served as an assistant master, head of English, senior master, as both junior and senior vice-principal before his appointment as headmaster in January 2004. Quigg retired in 2007.
- (2007–closure) David Carruthers was CAI's headmaster until its amalgamation to form Coleraine Grammar School. He was previously the head of mathematics at Royal Belfast Academical Institution.

== Notable alumni ==
- Richard Archibald, Irish Olympic rower 2004 and 2008. World silver medallist 2005, bronze medallist 2006
- Sir Dawson Bates, 1st Baronet, politician
- Air Marshal Sir George Beamish
- Victor Beamish RAF ace fighter pilot in WWII
- David Burnside, Ulster Unionist Party MLA and former MP
- Alan Campbell, 2004, 2008 and 2012 (bronze) Olympic rower, 2006 world champion, 2007 Henley diamond scull winner
- Mark Carruthers, TV presenter/personality
- Richard Chambers, 2007 World Champion and 2008 and 2012 (silver) Olympic rower
- Major General Ed Davis, Commandant General Royal Marines, Governor of Gibraltar
- John Clarke Davison, Ulster Unionist Party (UUP) politician
- Barry Hunter, former Northern Ireland international footballer
- Chris Hunter, British chemist and academic
- David McClarty, UUP MLA for Londonderry East
- Brigadier Mervyn McCord, former Commanding Officer of the Ulster Defence Regiment
- Graeme McDowell, Ryder Cup golfer and U.S. Open winner
- Jim Shannon, Democratic Unionist Party MP for Strangford
- Tommy Sheppard, Scottish National party MP for Edinburgh East.
- Edward H. Simpson, statistician and civil servant, known for Simpson's paradox
- James Stewart, lawyer
- Chris Cochrane - Irish National Team Rugby Player
- Andrew Trimble. Irish rugby union player
- James Nesbitt - Acclaimed actor known for his roles in TV shows like "Cold Feet" and "The Missing," as well as films like "Bloody Sunday" and "The Hobbit" trilogy.
- David Simpson - Former Member of Parliament (MP) for Upper Bann in Northern Ireland, serving from 2005 to 2019.
- Adrian Logan - Sports journalist and presenter, known for his work on BBC Northern Ireland and hosting "Sportscene."
- Darren Clarke - Professional golfer and Open Championship winner in 2011. Clarke has also represented Europe in several Ryder Cup tournaments.
- Philip Babington - Equestrian rider who competes in showjumping at international levels.
- Richard Rogers - Architect known for his innovative designs, including the Pompidou Centre in Paris and the Millennium Dome in London.
- Colin Bateman - Author and screenwriter known for his crime fiction novels, including the "Dan Starkey" series.
- Andy McBrine - Professional cricketer who represents Ireland internationally and plays for the North West Warriors domestically.
- Rodney McAree - Former professional footballer and manager, known for his time playing for Coleraine FC and managing Dungannon Swifts FC.
- Jonathan Rea - Motorcycle racer and multiple-time World Superbike Champion.
- Alastair Seeley - Motorcycle racer and the most successful rider in the history of the North West 200 road race.
- Gary Anderson - Professional darts player and two-time PDC World Darts Champion
- Stephen Bunting - Professional darts player and winner of the BDO World Darts Championship in 2014.
- Patrick McEleney - Professional footballer who plays as a midfielder and has represented clubs like Derry City and Dundalk FC.
- Trevor Ringland - Former professional rugby union player who played as a winger for Ulster and Ireland, and later became a politician and advocate for reconciliation.
- Robert Garrett - Former professional footballer who played as a midfielder for clubs like Linfield and Shamrock Rovers.
- Gareth McAuley - Former professional footballer who played as a defender for clubs like Ipswich Town, West Bromwich Albion, and the Northern Ireland national team.
- Richard Clarke - Former professional footballer who played as a midfielder for clubs like Linfield, Glentoran, and Portadown.
- Stephen Carson - Former professional footballer who played as a midfielder for clubs like Linfield, Coleraine, and Glentoran.
- Ryan Campbell - Former professional footballer who played as a forward for clubs like Linfield, Cliftonville, and Crusaders.Not a pupil
- John Bodkin Adams - mass murderer and convicted fraudster.
