= Vorpal (disambiguation) =

Vorpal is a nonsense word from the 1872 poem "Jabberwocky" by Lewis Carroll.

Vorpal or vorpal sword may also refer to:

- VORPAL, a computational plasma framework
- Vorpal sword, a phrase from "Jabberwocky" also used in popular culture
- Epyx Vorpal, a fastloading system for video games by Epyx Fast Load

== See also ==
- Vorpahl
