= Tülay Babuşcu =

Turkish politician (born 1976)

Tülay Babuşcu MP

Member of the Grand National Assembly
- In office 12 June 2011 – 7 June 2015
- Constituency: Balıkesir (2011)

Personal details
- Born: 26 January 1976 (age 50) Balıkesir, Turkey
- Party: Justice and Development Party
- Spouse: Lütfü Babuşcu
- Children: 1
- Education: Ege University
- Profession: Pharmacist
- Website: Official site

Tülay Babuşcu (born 26 January 1976) is a Turkish politician from Balıkesir who caused controversy in early 2015 for publicly declaring the end of the Turkish Republic and the resumption of the Ottoman Empire. She serves as a Member of Parliament for the Balıkesir electoral district from the ruling Justice and Development Party (AKP) since the 2011 general election. She was previously an AKP municipal councillor and also a member of the administrative committee of the AKP's Balıkesir branch.

Born and educated in Balıkesir, Babuşcu studied pharmaceutics at Ege University and worked as a pharmacist for ten years. She is married with one child. Her father is a retired İmam Hatip (religious) school teacher and her husband is a businessman.

Babuşcu failed to secure renomination for the June 2015 general election.

== Comments on the Republic ==
After President Recep Tayyip Erdoğan received Palestinian President Mahmoud Abbas with an Ottoman-style ceremony in 2015, Babuşcu wrote on her Facebook account that '90 years of adverts' had come to an end and the Ottoman Empire was beginning to resume. Her statements received huge controversy for referring to the Turkish Republic (established approximately 90 years ago in 1923) as '90 years of adverts after 600 years of the Ottoman Empire'. Despite criticism from several journalists, politicians and the Istanbul Bars Association, Babuşcu released a second statement claiming that 'the adverts have finished, the film has started and will be released in 2023'. This was a reference to the AKP's election slogan Hedef 2023 (Target 2023) which itself refers to the centenary of the establishment of the republic. She again caused controversy for retweeting a tweet that referred to İsmet İnönü, the 2nd President of Turkey, as a 'bitch' and 'friend of the Byzantines'. She was forced to apologise for the tweet in Parliament and subsequently deleted it.

It was revealed shortly after her statements that Babuşcu had made in excess of 3 million Turkish liras by selling antique Ottoman tulips, mainly to AKP-held municipalities through her multimillion lira flower business.

== See also ==
- List of MPs elected in the Turkish general election, 2011
