= Cecil Beamish =

RAF Air Vice Marshal & Irish rugby union player

Cecil Howard Beamish (31 March 1915 – 21 May 1999) was an Irish RAF officer, who served during the Second World War and was later Director of RAF Dental Services 1969–1973. He was the youngest of the Beamish brothers, the others being Victor, George and Charles, all RAF officers and accomplished sportsmen. Beamish played rugby for London Irish, the Barbarians and the RAF.

Beamish was an accomplished amateur golfer, who represented Ireland internationally; he won the Belgian Open Amateur Championship in 1951, was runner-up in the Irish Amateur Open Championship in 1952, was a semi-finalist in The Amateur Championship in 1953, won the Malayan Open Amateur Championship in 1954 and 1955, and won the Midland Amateur-Professional Foursomes alongside John Sharkey in 1958.

== Golf ==
=== Tournaments won ===
- 1951 Belgian Open Amateur Championship
- 1953 Hong Kong Open Amateur Championship
- 1954 Malayan Open Amateur Championship, Singapore Open Amateur Championship
- 1955 Malayan Open Amateur Championship
- 1958 Midland Amateur-Professional Foursomes (with John Sharkey)

=== Team appearances ===
- Men's Home Internationals (representing Ireland): 1950, 1951, 1953, 1956
