= Tums (disambiguation) =

Tums is brand of antacid.

Tums may also refer to:

- Tehran University of Medical Sciences (TUMS), located in Tehran, Iran
- Tabriz University of Medical Sciences (TUMS), located in Tabriz, Iran
- Tums Fast Relief 500, a NASCAR Sprint Cup Series stock car race in Martinsville, Virginia

== See also ==
- Tum (disambiguation)
