= Balıkesir (electoral district) =

Electoral district for the Grand National Assembly of Turkey

Coordinates: 37°50′N 34°45′E

- electoral district for the Grand National Assembly of Turkey
- Balıkesir shown within Turkey
- Province: Balıkesir
- Electorate: 866,739

Current electoral district
- Created: 1920
- Seats: 8 Historical: 9 (1999)
- Turnout at last election: 90.16%
- Representation
- AK Party: 4 / 8
- CHP: 3 / 8
- MHP: 1 / 8

Balıkesir is an electoral district of the Grand National Assembly of Turkey. It elects eight members of parliament (deputies) to represent the province of the same name for a four-year term by the D'Hondt method, a party-list proportional representation system.

== Members ==
Population reviews of each electoral district are conducted before each general election, which can lead to certain districts being granted a smaller or greater number of parliamentary seats. Balıkesir elected 9 MPs in 1999. The district has lost one seat since then and has elected 8 MPs since 2002.

MPs for Balıkesir, 2002 onwards
Election	2002 (22nd Parliament)	2007 (23rd Parliament)	2011 (24th Parliament)	June 2015 (25th Parliament)	November 2015 (26th Parliament)
MP	Ali Aydınlıoğlu; AK Party	Ayşe Akbaş; AK Party	Ali Aydınlıoğlu; AK Party		
MP	Turhan Çömez; AK Party	Mehmet Cemal Öztaylan; AK Party		Sema Kırcı; AK Party	
MP	Ahmet Edip Uğur; AK Party			Mahmut Poyrazlı; AK Party	
MP	Ali Osman Sali; AK Party		Tülay Babuşcu; AK Party	Recep Çetin; MHP	Kasım Bostan; AK Party
MP	Orhan Sür; CHP	Ahmet Duran Bulut; MHP		İsmail Ok; MHP	
MP	İsmail Özgün; AK Party		Ayşe Nedret Akova; CHP	Ahmet Akın; CHP	
MP	Ali Kemal Deveciler; CHP	Ergün Aydoğan; CHP	Haluk Ahmet Gümüş; CHP	Mehmet Tüm; CHP	
MP	Sedat Pekel; CHP	Hüseyin Pazarcı; CHP	Namık Havutça; CHP		

== General elections ==
=== 2011 ===
2011 general election: Balıkesir
Party	Candidate	Votes	%	±%
AK Party	4 elected ▼1: 1. Ahmet Edip Uğur ✓; 2. Mehmet Cemal Öztaylan ✓; 3. Tülay Babuşçu ✓; 4. Ali Aydınlıoğlu ✓; 5. Mehmet Akif Okur ✗; 6. Emin Mehmet Karatan ✗; 7. Ekrem Yavaş ✗; 8. Hilal Demirözer ✗	356,649	46.50	▲5.04
CHP	3 elected ▲1: 1. Namık Havutça ✓; 2. Ayşe Nedret Akova ✓; 3. Haluk Ahmet Gümüş ✓; 4. Ahmet Akın ✗; 5. Hasan İşgüzar ✗; 6. Hüsnü Erol ✗; 7. İrfan Barış ✗; 8. Ömür Mustafa Boyuer ✗	259,104	33.78	▲9.46
MHP	1 elected 0: 1. Ahmet Duran Bulut ✓; 2. Rafet Çetinel ✗; 3. Ahmet Keskin ✗; 4. Ruşen Aşkın Akçay ✗; 5. Kemal Girgin ✗; 6. Zakir Yılmaz ✗; 7. Yılmaz Uçak ✗; 8. Uğur Söğüt ✗	106,663	13.91	▼1.93
DP	None elected: 1. İlhan Erdinç ✗; 2. Ata Selçuk ✗; 3. Elif Zeynep Eken ✗; 4. Mehmet Efe ✗; 5. Ali Rıza Deniz ✗; 6. Mehmet Bakir Arslan ✗; 7. Sabir Arslan ✗; 8. Halil İbrahim Akkoca ✗	9,145	1.19	▼7.66
SAADET	None elected: 1. Bayram Ali Ayyıldız ✗; 2. Murat Sali ✗; 3. Ömer Taşkın ✗; 4. Abdullah Özlen ✗; 5. Lütfi Çelik ✗; 6. Mehmet Filiz ✗; 7. Zülfer Erol ✗; 8. Ahmet Pınar ✗	8,724	1.14	▼0.91
Independent	None elected: Turan Cengiz ✗ Kartal Cemil Demir ✗ Serap Yeşiltuna ✗	6,785	0.88	▲0.17
HAS Party	None elected: 1. Cengiz Yücel Özek ✗; 2. Nevzat Kulaoğlu ✗; 3. Necdet Debre ✗; 4. Tanju Akçe ✗; 5. Şükran Karaboğa ✗; 6. Hakan Demirtaş ✗; 7. Nejla Caner ✗; 8. Faruk Kulaksızoğlu ✗	4,583	0.60	▲0.60
Büyük Birlik	None elected: 1. Zekai Çakır ✗; 2. Barış Aybaşlı ✗; 3. Hüseyin Karagöz ✗; 4. Zeki Akın ✗; 5. Şeref Kafa ✗; 6. İsmail Şılmaz ✗; 7. Cemalettin Ateş ✗; 8. Ahmet Duman ✗	2,887	0.38	▲0.38
HEPAR	None elected: 1. Aysel Kökener ✗; 2. Çağlayan Yaşar ✗; 3. Esra Öztürkler ✗; 4. Hüseyin Uçar ✗; 5. Emrah Eruysal ✗; 6. Kazım Aka ✗; 7. Mehmet Gökhan Erten ✗; 8. Mehmet İlem ✗	2,504	0.33	▲0.33
DYP	None elected: 1. Eser Özaçıkgöz ✗; 2. Cem Erdeveciler ✗; 3. Mustafa Yalazı ✗; 4. Adem Dimici ✗; 5. Murat Aksakal ✗; 6. Burçak Çolak ✗; 7. Şahin Erbay ✗; 8. Murat Deringöl ✗	2,465	0.32	▲0.32
DSP	None elected: 1. Ahmet Aydoğdu ✗; 2. Ümit Ayhan ✗; 3. Metin Özyurt ✗; 4. Muharrem Yavuz ✗; 5. Süleyman Palalı ✗; 6. Ali Bozdak ✗; 7. İsmail Çalışkan ✗; 8. Hüseyin Kadıoğlu ✗	2,448	0.32	N/A
Labour	None elected: 1. Zeynep Henza Çalışkan ✗; 2. Ayten Çetin ✗; 3. Rıfat Ada ✗; 4. Cemil Tosunoğlu ✗; 5. Ferhat Gürkan ✗; 6. Zeynel Altan ✗; 7. Yetiş Yılmaz Şentürk ✗; 8. Elif Özer ✗	2,113	0.28	▲0.27
TKP	None elected: 1. Selami Kıymaç ✗; 2. Mustafa Yalazı ✗; 3. Yılmaz Altıntaş ✗; 4. Hasan Atilla ✗; 5. Selim Sarıcan ✗; 6. Bülent Acar ✗; 7. Münür Çalışkan ✗; 8. Nurten Kuşatan ✗	921	0.12	▼0.16
Nationalist Conservative	None elected: 1. Samet Ömer Oyal ✗; 2. Volkan Orhan Kutun ✗; 3. Sibel Türkoğlu ✗; 4. Ziya Önçırak ✗; 5. Serkan Tavşan ✗; 6. Hatice Gürsal ✗; 7. Naciye Çelik ✗; 8. Mahigül Yılmaz ✗	827	0.11	▲0.11
MP	None elected: 1. Ahmet Yakaner ✗; 2. Meral Atlıakın ✗; 3. Eyüp Baş ✗; 4. Ergün Yıldırım ✗; 5. Mehmet Bircan ✗; 6. İsmail Şen ✗; 7. Serdar Matışlı ✗; 8. Bekir Sezer ✗	679	0.09	▲0.09
Liberal Democrat	None elected: 1. Ahmet Doğru ✗; 2. Gökhan Takım ✗; 3. Aydın Ulaşan ✗; 4. Ahmet Denizeri ✗; 5. Onur Öz ✗; 6. Murad Tayoğlu ✗; 7. Halil İhsan Çakır ✗; 8. İbrahim Derli ✗	441	0.06	▼0.17
Total votes		766,938	100.00	
Rejected ballots		16,881	2.16	▲0.08
Turnout		781,410	90.16	▲1.42
AK Party hold Majority		92,074	12.72	▼4.43

=== June 2015 ===
Abbr.	Party	Votes	%
AK Party	Justice and Development Party	305,602	38.9%
CHP	Republican People's Party	267,677	34%
MHP	Nationalist Movement Party	159,274	20.3%
HDP	Peoples' Democratic Party	24,121	3.1%
SP	Felicity Party	14,324	1.8%
	Other	15,185	1.9%
Total		786,183	
Turnout		88.54	
source: YSK

=== November 2015 ===
Abbr.	Party	Votes	%
AK Party	Justice and Development Party	361,821	45.5%
CHP	Republican People's Party	275,229	34.6%
MHP	Nationalist Movement Party	117,551	14.8%
HDP	Peoples' Democratic Party	18,382	2.3%
SP	Felicity Party	6,788	0.9%
	Other	14,796	1.9%
Total		794,567	
Turnout		88.54	
source: YSK

=== 2018 ===
Abbr.	Party	Votes	%
AK Party	Justice and Development Party	338,879	40.4%
CHP	Republican People's Party	256,303	30.6%
IYI	Good Party	125,333	14.9%
MHP	Nationalist Movement Party	62,255	7.4%
HDP	Peoples' Democratic Party	32,275	3.8%
SP	Felicity Party	9,811	1.2%
	Other	13,751	1.6%
Total		838,607	
Turnout		90.81	
source: YSK

== Presidential elections ==
=== 2014 ===
2014 presidential election: Balıkesir
Party	Candidate	Votes	%
Independent	Ekmeleddin İhsanoğlu	368,822	49.36
AK Party	Recep Tayyip Erdoğan	357,170	47.80
HDP	Selahattin Demirtaş	21,273	2.85
Total votes		747,265	100.00
Rejected ballots		15,038	1.97
Turnout		762,303	83.17
Ekmeleddin İhsanoğlu win			
