= Vorpahl =

Vorpahl (from German: vor "before", "in front of" plus Pfahl "pole", "pale") is a Low German dwelling/habitational surname for a person who lived at a boundary marker (Grenzpfahl: "boundary post"). Notable people with the name include:

- Chris Vorpahl (born 1990), retired Chilean female volleyball player
- Kurt Vorpahl (1905–1944), German communist resistance fighter against Nazism
- Mildred Vorpahl Baass (1917–2012), American poet
- Nicole Vorpahl (born 1994), Chilean volleyball player

== See also ==
- Vorpal (disambiguation)
