= Wabe =

Wabe or WABE may refer to:

== Rivers ==
- Wabe (Schunter), a river of Lower Saxony, Germany
- Wabe River, a river of south-central Ethiopia

== Media ==
- WABE (FM), a radio station (90.1 FM) in Atlanta, Georgia, United States
- WABE-TV, a television station (channel 30) in Atlanta, Georgia, United States

== Other uses ==
- Wabe language, a language of Mexico
- Wabe (nonce word), a nonsense word coined by Lewis Carroll
- Ashea Wabe, (1871–1908) a belly dancer in New York City
- The Wabe, a house in London, England
