= Mischmasch =

Periodical written by Lewis Carroll

Mischmasch was a periodical that Lewis Carroll wrote and illustrated for the amusement of his family from 1855 to 1862. It is notable for containing the earliest version of the poem "Jabberwocky", which Carroll would later expand and publish in Through the Looking-Glass. It was collected into The Rectory Umbrella and Mischmasch, published in 1932.

In German, Mischmasch (masc.), pronounced [ˈmɪʃmaʃ], also refers to a disorderly mixture of things, see mish mash.
