= Coleraine Grammar School =

Grammar school in Northern Ireland

Location
- 23–33 Castlerock Road; Coleraine, County Londonderry, BT51 3LA; Northern Ireland; 55.1368°N 6.6855°W

Information
- Type: Voluntary grammar school
- Motto: In Scientia Opportunitas
- Established: 2015; 11 years ago
- Founders: Amalgamation
- Local authority: NEELB
- Headmaster: David Carruthers
- Staff: Approx >70 teaching staff
- Gender: Co-educational
- Age range: 11–18
- Enrolment: 1052 (1052)
- Capacity: 1052
- Campus size: >50 acres
- Colours: Maroon, White and Navy
- Affiliation: Headmasters' and Headmistresses' Conference
- Website: www.colerainegrammar.com

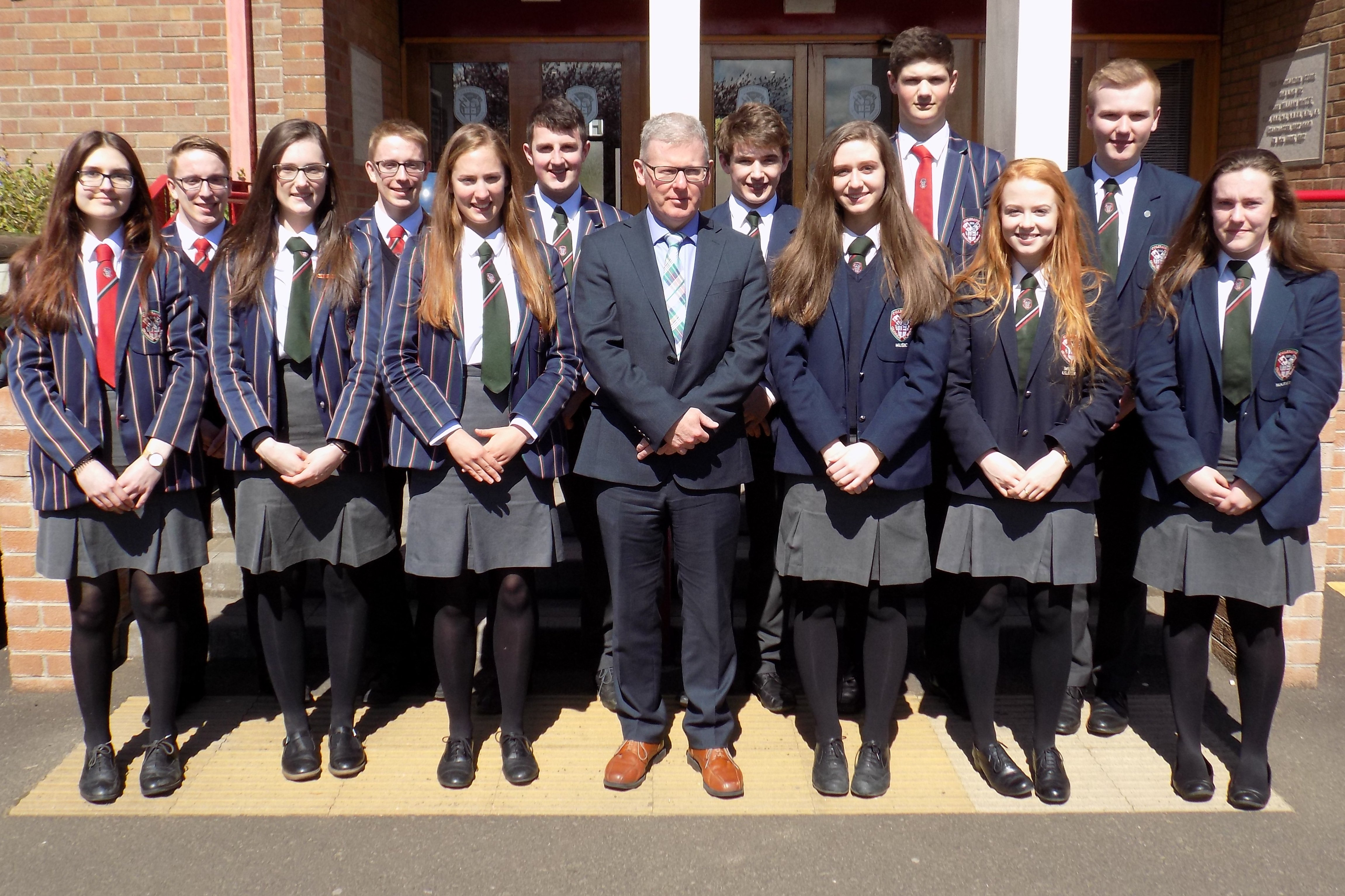
The 2018-2019 Senior Prefect Team from Coleraine Grammar School

Coleraine Grammar School is a co-educational grammar school in Coleraine, County Londonderry, Northern Ireland that was established in 2015 following the amalgamation of Coleraine Academical Institution and Coleraine High School. The school was split over two campuses - Castlerock Road and Lodge Road - in Coleraine until November 2024 when, following the completion of new school buildings, the whole school was able to be located on the Castlerock Road campus. The Castlerock Road campus also includes significant sports grounds including rugby pitches, hockey pitch (to be completed 2025) and boat house on the River Bann.
