= Robert Boyd (RAF officer) =

British flying ace of WWII

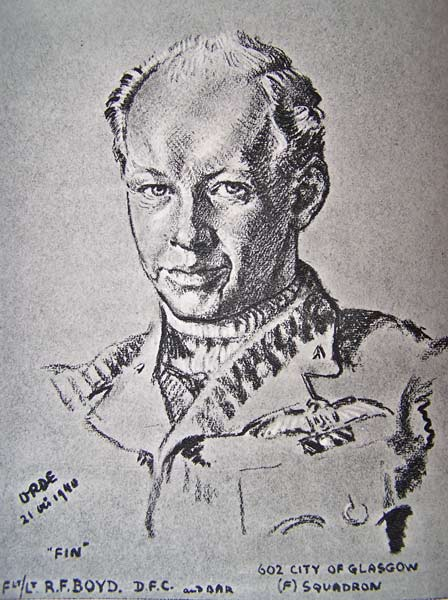
- Portrait of Boyd, made by Cuthbert Orde in October 1940
- Born: 8 June 1916; East Kilbride, Scotland
- Died: 22 February 1975 (aged 58); Renfrew, Scotland
- Military career
- Allegiance: United Kingdom
- Branch: Royal Air Force
- Service years: 1935–1945
- Rank: Group Captain
- Commands: No. 293 Wing; Kenley Wing; No. 54 Squadron
- Conflicts: Second World War: Battle of Britain; Circus offensive
- Awards: Distinguished Service Order; Distinguished Flying Cross & Bar; Mention in Despatches

Robert Findlay Boyd, DSO, DFC & Bar (8 June 1916 – 22 February 1975) was a British flying ace who served in the Royal Air Force (RAF) during the Second World War. He was credited with having shot down at least fourteen aircraft.

Born in East Kilbride, Scotland, Boyd joined the Royal Auxiliary Air Force in 1935, serving with No. 602 Squadron. Called up for service with the RAF upon the outbreak of the Second World War, he achieved several aerial victories during the Battle of Britain. His successes saw him awarded the Distinguished Flying Cross and Bar. Towards the end of 1940, he was appointed commander of No. 54 Squadron, leading it through the early phases of the Circus offensive the following year and claiming more victories over the Luftwaffe until he was taken off operations, by which time he had been awarded the Distinguished Service Order. From December 1941 to April 1942, he was wing leader of the Kenley Wing. Much of his later war service was spent in South Asia as commander of No. 293 Wing. By the end of the war, he held the rank of group captain. Returning to civilian life in the postwar period, his final years were spent on the Isle of Skye.

== Early life ==
Robert Findlay Boyd was born on 8 June 1916 in East Kilbride, Scotland. He joined No. 602 Squadron of the Royal Auxiliary Air Force in 1935, and was commissioned as a pilot officer later that year. He was promoted to flying officer two years later. He was working as a mining engineer at the time of the outbreak of the Second World War, and was called up for service with the Royal Air Force (RAF). He was promptly promoted to flight lieutenant.

== Second World War ==
At the start of the war in September 1939, No. 602 Squadron, which operated the Supermarine Spitfire fighter, was based at Abbotsinch but in October shifted to Grangemouth, from where it conducted patrols over the Firth of Forth. On 16 October it was involved in the interception of Luftwaffe attacks on the United Kingdom, recording the first aerial victories for British-based aircraft since the First World War. On 7 July 1940, Boyd shared, with two other pilots, in the destruction of a Junkers Ju 88 medium bomber that was intercepted to the east of St Abb's Head.

=== Battle of Britain ===
As the Battle of Britain escalated, No. 602 Squadron was transferred to Westhampnett, in the south of England, as part of the Tangmere Wing. The squadron was regularly scrambled to intercept bombers prior to their crossing the English coastline but later in the campaign, when the Luftwaffe's focus shifted to London, more of the squadron's inceptions were achieved over England itself. Boyd, who was now a flight commander, shared in the shooting down of a Dornier Do 17 medium bomber to the south of Portland on 15 August 1940. The next day, he destroyed a Junkers Ju 87 dive bomber south of the squadron's airfield at Westhampnett. He had only just taken off, and the Ju 87 had pulled out of a dive just in front of him, offering an easy target. Later in the day he helped shoot down a Heinkel He 111 medium bomber to the north of Worthing. On 18 August, which later became known as The Hardest Day, he destroyed a Ju 87 and a Messerschmitt Bf 109 fighter, and damaged a second Ju 87, all over the airfield at Ford. The following day, he and other pilots intercepted a Ju 88 over Tangmere and destroyed it.

Boyd shot down two Bf 109s intercepted over Dorchester on 25 August. He claimed a Do 17 as destroyed near Arundel on 4 September, and also shot down a Bf 109 in the vicinity the same day. On 11 September, south of Selsey Bill, he destroyed a Bf 109 and damaged another. He was one of several pilots that combined to destroy a Ju 88 to the south of Brighton on 21 September. This success was followed on 26 September with his shooting down of one Bf 109 and probable destruction of a second, both near Southampton. By this time, he had been awarded the Distinguished Flying Cross (DFC). The published citation read:

Flight Lieutenant Boyd has led his flight into action on all possible occasions and by his initiative and accurate shooting has personally destroyed nine enemy aircraft. He has displayed cool judgment and a keen desire to engage the enemy irrespective of the odds against him.

— London Gazette, No. 34951, 24 September 1940

At the start of October, Boyd together with his wing man destroyed a Ju 88 off Selsey Bill. Towards the end of the month, he was awarded a Bar to his DFC. The published citation read:

This officer has personally destroyed at least 12 enemy aircraft, and has assisted in the destruction of one other. His fine leadership has enabled his squadron to attain many successes with few losses to themselves. Flight Lieutenant Boyd has distinguished himself by his cool bearing and capable leadership.

— London Gazette, No. 34978, 25 October 1940

On 13 November, Boyd once again combined with other pilots to destroy a Ju 88, this time north of Brighton. At the start of the following month he was promoted to temporary squadron leader and appointed commander of No. 54 Squadron. His new command, which had been heavily engaged for much the fighting over the southeast of England, was based at Catterick for a rest period. Its Spitfires were only scrambled on a few occasions for the next few months but the squadron went south to Hornchurch in February 1941.

=== Circus offensive ===
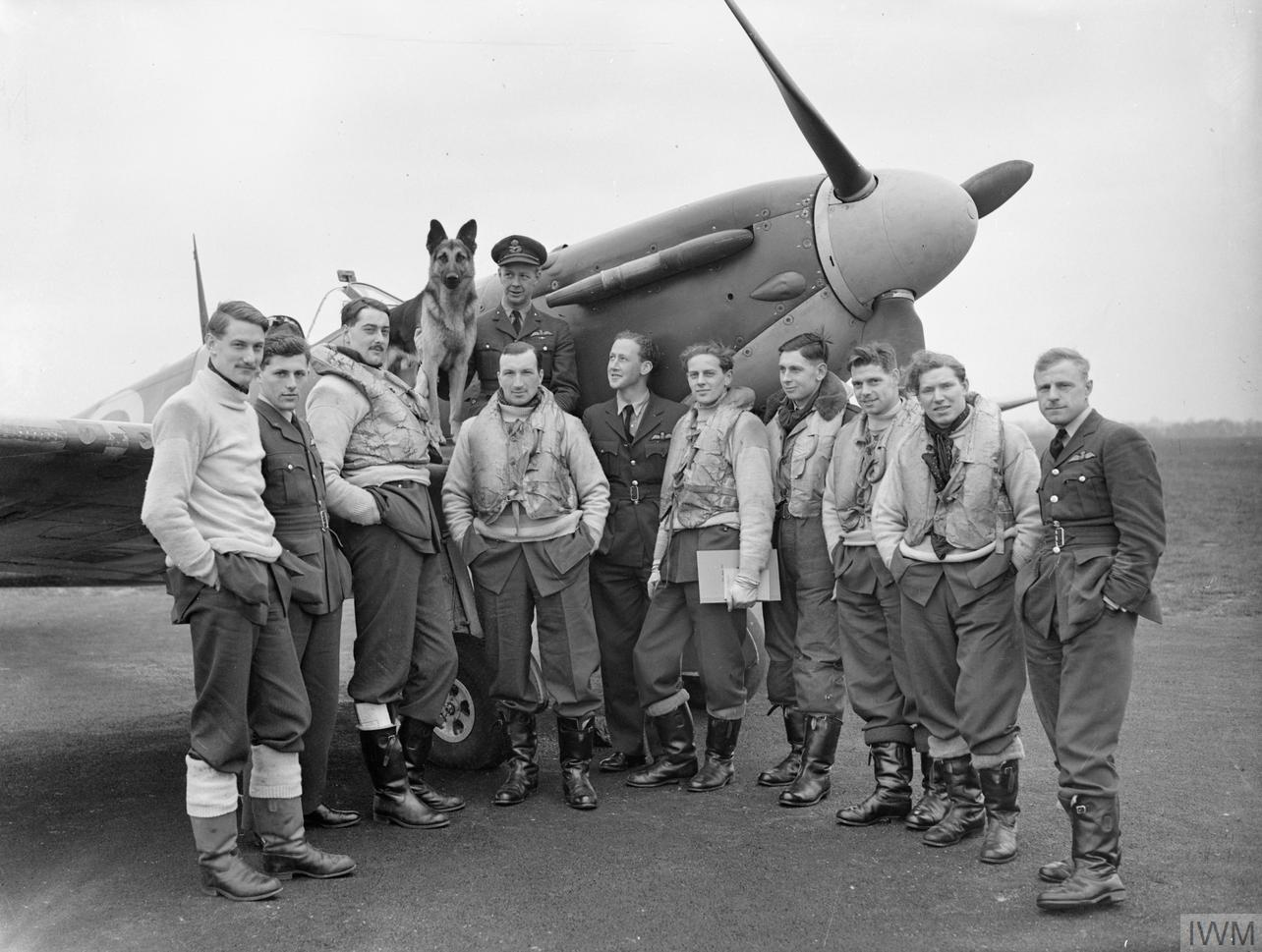
Pilots of No. 54 Squadron gathered round a Supermarine Spitfire, with Boyd sitting on the wing

The RAF mounted its Circus offensive in early 1941 and with its move south, No. 54 Squadron began to take part in operations to France, intended to draw out the Luftwaffe. On one of these, carried out on 17 April, Boyd shot down a Messerschmitt Bf 110 heavy fighter into the English Channel well to the east of Manston. While providing cover for Bristol Blenheim light bombers attacking railway infrastructure at Hazebrouck on 22 June, he probably destroyed a Bf 109. Four days later he shot down a second Bf 109 northeast of Gravelines. On 8 July, while escorting several Short Stirling heavy bombers to Lille, he destroyed one Bf 109 and damaged another. Two days later, back in the vicinity of Gravelines, he shot down a Bf 109. A week afterwards, he destroyed a Bf 109 over Hardelot.

Later in July, Boyd was taken off operations and posted to No. 58 Operational Training Unit at Grangemouth as an instructor. In November he returned to operations with an appointment as wing leader of the Kenley Wing. Based at Kenley, this was composed of three squadrons: No. 452 Squadron, No. 485 Squadron and No. 602 Squadron, his former unit.

On 12 February 1942, Boyd was flying a sortie with Group Captain Victor Beamish, the station commander at Hornchurch, over the English Channel when they spotted the German battleships Scharnhorst and Gneisenau, the heavy cruiser Prinz Eugen and escorting ships steaming past as they made their 'Channel Dash'. Maintaining radio silence in accordance with their instructions, the pair raised the alarm upon their return to Hornchurch. He damaged a Bf 109 near Beachy Head on 19 February. At the start of the following month, he was promoted to temporary wing commander. On 28 March, he claimed a Focke-Wulf Fw 190 fighter as probably destroyed near Cap Gris-Nez and damaged two Fw 190s near Gravelines on 12 April. He was awarded the Distinguished Service Order (DSO) the same month. The published citation read:

Since December, 1941, this officer has led a wing on many operational missions. Much of the outstanding successes which have been obtained can be attributed to the leadership, skill and fighting spirit of this officer. Since being awarded a bar to the Distinguished Flying Cross, Wing Commander Boyd has destroyed a further 12 enemy aircraft, bringing his total victories to 22.

— London Gazette, No. 35518, 10 April 1942

=== Later war service ===
Boyd ceded command of Kenley Wing soon after being awarded the DSO, and an appointment as the station commander at Eglinton followed. During this time, on 15 March 1943, Boyd achieved his final aerial victory to the northwest of Donegal, claiming a Ju 88 as damaged. He was subsequently dispatched to India, serving with the headquarters of the Third Tactical Air Force in Bengal. From April 1944, he led No. 293 Wing. His wing commander rank was made substantive later in the year.

By early January 1945, Boyd had attained the rank of group captain and had been mentioned in despatches. He ended his service with the RAF after the cessation of hostilities. He was credited with having destroyed fourteen German aircraft and shared in the destruction of seven others. He also claimed three aircraft as probably destroyed and seven damaged.

== Later life ==
In civilian life, Boyd worked as a pilot for Scottish Aviation, but subsequently took up farming and commercial fishing. In his later years, he lived on the Isle of Skye, where he kept a pub at Uig. He died on 22 February 1975 while visiting the home of fellow No. 602 Squadron veteran, George Pinkerton, at Renfrew on mainland Scotland.
