= Michael Price =

Michael, Mick or Mike Price may refer to:

== Sportspeople ==
- Michael Price (cricketer) (born 1981), South African cricketer
- Michael Price (footballer, born 1982), Welsh football defender
- Michael Price (footballer, born 1983), English football goalkeeper
- Mick Price (footballer) (1914–1973), Australian rules footballer
- Mick Price (snooker player) (born 1966), English snooker player
- Mike Price (born 1946), American college football coach
- Mike Price (basketball) (born 1948), American shooting guard

== Other people ==
- Michael F. Price (1951–2022), American value investor and fund manager
- Michael P. Price (born 1938), American theatre producer and artistic director
- Michael Price (composer), English film and TV composer
- Michael Price (sculptor) (1940–2001), American sculptor
- Michael Price (writer) (born 1958), American television writer and producer
- Mick Price (Irish republican) (born 1896), Irish republican revolutionary and political activist
- Mike Price (jazz trumpeter) (born 1941), American jazz trumpeter and composer
