= Richard Clarke (footballer, born 1979) =

Northern Irish footballer and manager

Personal information
- Date of birth: 29 May 1979 (age 47)
- Place of birth: Castlederg, Northern Ireland
- Position: Central midfielder

Youth career
- Dungoyne Boys

Senior career*
Years	Team	Apps	(Gls)
1994–2013	Portadown		
2013–2014	Dergview		

International career
1999–2000	Northern Ireland U21	5	(0)

Managerial career
- 2013–2018: Dergview
- * Club domestic league appearances and goals as of 12:39, 20 June 2013 (UTC)

Richard D. J. Clarke (born 29 May 1979) is a Northern Irish former footballer who was most recently manager of Dergview. Clarke played as a central midfielder.

== Career ==
=== Club career ===
Born in Castlederg, Clarke signed for Portadown in 1994, from amateur side Dungoyne Boys. He has appeared in European competition for Portadown, and won the Northern Ireland Football Writer's Association 'Young Player of the Year' award in 1999.

With Portadown, Clarke has won two leagues competitions and six cups.

Since 2009, Clarke has made over 60 appearances in the IFA for Portadown.

=== International career ===
Clarke was a Northern Ireland under-21 international.

In February 2007, Clarke was a squad member for a Northern Ireland representative side which competed against an England representative side.

=== Management career ===
Clarke was appointed player-manager of Dergview in June 2013. He resigned in January 2018.

== Personal life ==
Clarke is distantly related to his namesake and fellow footballer Richard Clarke.

Clarke had testicular cancer in 2012.

== Honours ==
Portadown

- Irish League - 2001–02
- Irish Cup - 1998-99, 2004–05
- IFA Championship - 2008–09
- Charity Shield - 1999–00
- Co-Op Insurance Cup - 2008–09
- Ivan Marshall Memorial Cup - 2004–05
- Royal Mail Community Action Cup - 2003–04, 2004–05
