= Mehmet Tüm =

Turkish politician

Mehmet Tüm MP
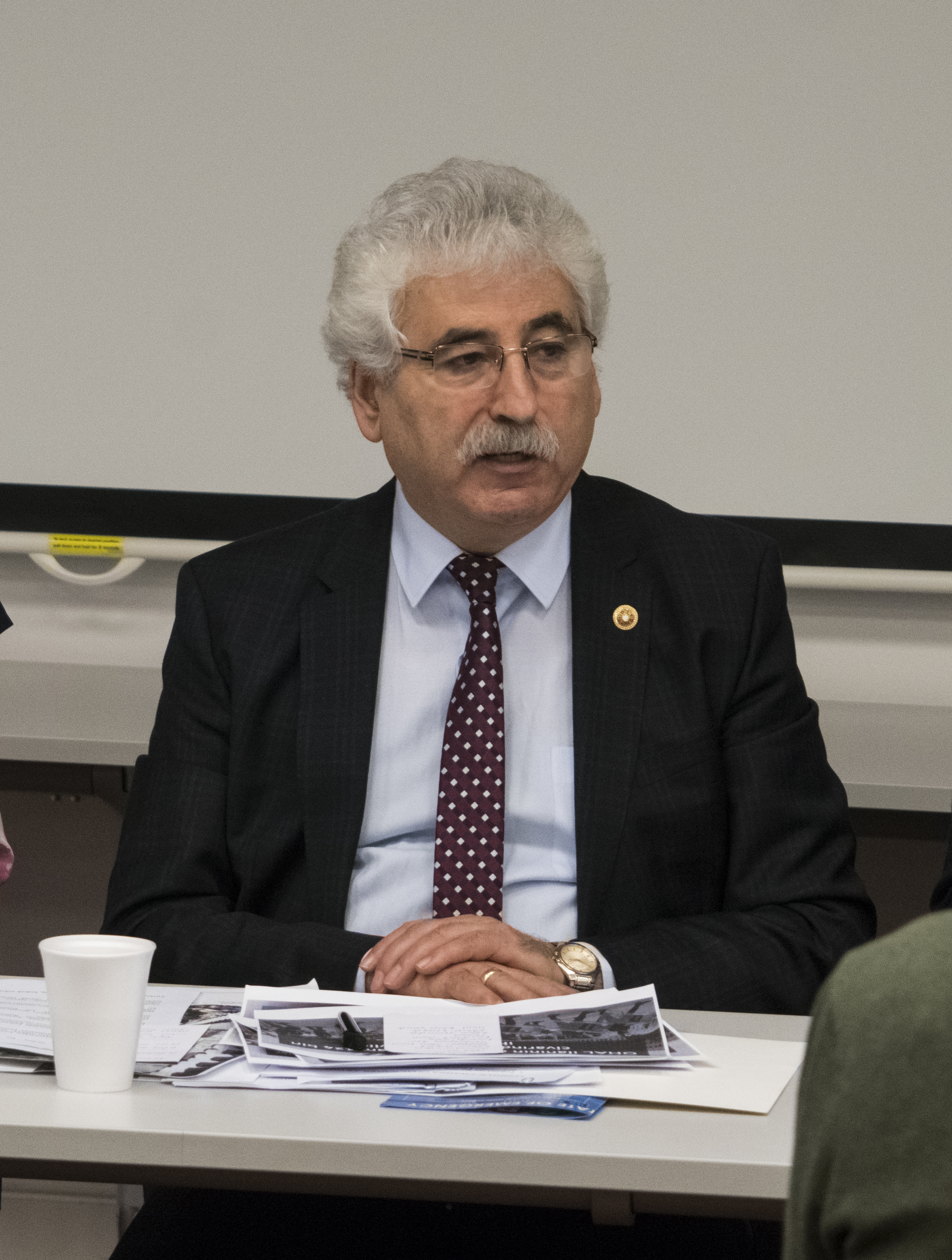

Member of the Grand National Assembly
- Incumbent
- Assumed office 7 June 2015
- Constituency: Balıkesir (Jun 2015, Nov 2015)

Personal details
- Born: 1 January 1957 (age 69) Kayseri, Turkey
- Party: Republican People's Party
- Website: Official site

Mehmet Tüm is a Turkish politician from the Republican People's Party (CHP) who currently serves as a Member of Parliament for the electoral district of Balıkesir since 7 June 2015. He was first elected in the June 2015 general election and was re-elected in the November 2015 general election. He is also a member of the CHP party council.

== Early life and career ==
Mehmet Tüm was born on 1 January 1957 in Kayseri and was educated at the Department of Construction and Technics at Kayseri Technical High School. He began working at the Ministry of Public Works (now the Ministry of Environment and Urban Planning) and was sent to Balıkesir for work reasons. While working at the ministry, he studied at the Necati Bey Evening Education Faculty. In 1990, Tüm founded Tüm Structures and Construction Limited, which began operations in the districts of Bandırma and Edremit.

== Political career ==
=== Early career ===
Between 1994 and 1999, Tüm served as a member of the Republican People's Party (CHP) district executive in Bandırma, having been elected to the Bandırma Municipal Council in the 1994 local elections. In 2000, he served as the Balıkesir representative of the Social Democracy Foundation (SODEV) and later served as the SODEV's national general secretary.

=== Member of Parliament ===
For the June 2015 general election, Mehmet Tüm became the CHP's top candidate on the party's candidate lists for the electoral district of Balıkesir and was elected to Parliament. He stood again as a candidate for the November 2015 general election and was re-elected, again as the top CHP candidate on the party's provincial list. He is a member of the parliamentary Environment Commission.

== See also ==
- 25th Parliament of Turkey
- 26th Parliament of Turkey
