= Coleraine High School =

Grammar school in Northern Ireland

Coordinates: 55.130°N 6.662°W

- Coleraine, County Londonderry; Northern Ireland

Information
- Type: All girls Grammar school
- Established: 1875
- Founder: Mrs Long
- Closed: June 2015
- Gender: Girls
- Enrollment: c.800

Coleraine High School was an all-girls' grammar school located in Coleraine, County Londonderry, Northern Ireland. Originally founded in 1875, Coleraine High School merged with Coleraine Academical Institution to form Coleraine Grammar School in 2015. As of 2024, the Lodge Road campus is now closed.

== History ==
In 1875, the High School, or Gordonville Ladies' Academy as it was originally known, was founded in Alexander Terrace, Coleraine, by Mrs Long, assisted by her daughter and staff.

From 1924 until 1959, the school, as a voluntary grammar school, was controlled by a board of governors. In 1959, the day school was transferred to the County Londonderry Education Committee, and then, in the local government re-organisation of 1973, to the North Eastern Education and Library Board as a controlled grammar school. The Boarding Department remained the responsibility of the Board of Governors until its closure in 1997. The school moved from the "Gordonville" site in 1966 when the present buildings were completed and a further extension was added in 1971. It was once home to both boarders and day pupils. Later, the boarding department closed but there were still over 800 day pupils.

In June 2015, Coleraine High School amalgamated with Coleraine Academical Institution to form Coleraine Grammar School. Between 2015 and 2024, the school operated on both the former site of Coleraine High School and the Coleraine Academical Institution site. From Autumn term 2024, all pupils attend lessons on the site of the former Coleraine Academical Institution following the closure of the Coleraine High School site. As of 2024, the Lodge Road campus was closed.

== Houses ==
The school was divided into four houses:

- Fermoyle - yellow
- Culrath - red
- Inverbann- indigo
- Cranagh - turquoise

== See also ==
- List of grammar schools in Northern Ireland
