= Charles Beamish =

British Lions & Ireland international rugby union player

- Born: Charles Eric St John Beamish; 23 June 1908 Cork, Ireland
- Died: 18 May 1984 (aged 75) Templemore, Ireland
- Notable relative: George Beamish (brother)

Rugby union career
- Position: prop
Senior career
Years	Team	Apps	(Points)
-1933	NIFC		
1933	Harlequins		
1926–1936	Leicester	17	
????	RAF		
1934–38	Barbarians	9	(3)
International career
Years	Team	Apps	(Points)
1933–1938	Ireland	12	(3)
1936	Great Britain	0	(0)

Group Captain Charles Eric St John Beamish (23 June 1908 – 18 May 1984) was an Irish rugby player and Second World War RAF pilot. He gained 12 caps for Ireland as a prop forward and also represented the British Isles on their 1936 tour of Argentina. He was one of the Beamish brothers - elder brother George also played for Ireland, and other brothers Victor and Cecil were also accomplished sportsmen and RAF officers.

== Rugby career ==
Beamish played his first international match for Ireland in the encounter against Wales in the 1933 Home Nations Championship. At the time Beamish was playing at club level for North of Ireland F.C., and when he joined the Ireland squad he came in at prop, with his elder brother George at No 8. and team captain. Ireland won the game 10-5, and Beamish was reselected for the final match of the tournament against Scotland in April. By this time Beamish was no longer recorded as playing for North of Ireland, and had switched clubs to English side Harlequins.

Although missing the opening loss to England, Beamish was back in the Ireland squad for the second game of the 1934 Home Nations Championship, against Scotland. He had again swapped club sides and was now turning out for Leicester, the same club as brother George. Beamish also played in the final game of the championship, against Wales. It was a poor campaign for Ireland and they finished bottom of the table without a win. The 1934/35 season was also notable as he was invited to play for the British touring team the Barbarians for whom he would play a total of 9 matches between 1934 and 1938.

The 1935 Championship saw Beamish play in all three matches, and despite a bad loss against England in the opening game, victories over Scotland and Wales gave Ireland the title, Beamish's first Championship win. In late 1935 Beamish was selected to face his first overseas team when the touring New Zealand team came to Ireland. Ireland played well, and despite Beamish scoring his only international try during this game, it was not enough to stop the All Blacks.

In 1936 Beamish was invited to tour Argentina with the Great Britain.

== Biography ==
- Godwin, Terry (1984). The International Rugby Championship 1883–1983. London: Willow Books. ISBN 000218060X.
