= Boeing Duveen and The Beautiful Soup =

Boeing Duveen and the Beautiful Soup was a 1960s British psychedelic rock act. 'Boeing Duveen' was Sam Hutt, a qualified doctor and associate of Pink Floyd who has been described as "the underground community's de facto house doctor" by David Wells, curator of Grapefruit. Hutt later became known for his work in the country and western genre under the name of Hank Wangford.

The band released one single on 10 May 1968, "Jabberwock" backed by "Which Dreamed It", on the Parlophone label. The single is one of the earliest productions by Tony Visconti. Both songs' lyrics were adapted from poems from Through the Looking-Glass by Lewis Carroll, and Carroll was credited as co-writer with Hutt. Hutt would later reflect "I'd learnt the guitar in the Fifties, but I couldn't write words". Hutt played sitar on "Which Dreamed It". Initial copies of the single featured a picture sleeve reproducing John Tenniel's original illustration of the Jabberwock. The band's name also comes from a poem by Lewis Carroll, Beautiful Soup, from Alice's Adventures in Wonderland. Both sides of the single were included in the Rubble series - "Jabberwock" in the 14th volume and "Which Dreamed It" in the 20th. The single is included in David Wells' 2005 book Record Collector 100 Greatest Psychedelic Records.
