= Victor Beamish =

Irish-born RAF flying ace (1903–1942)

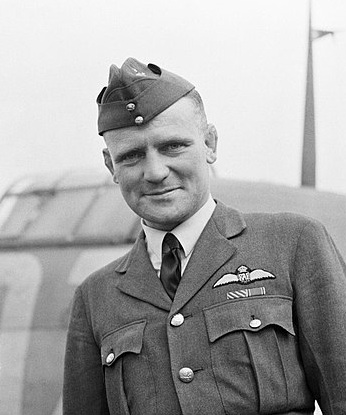
- Wing Commander FV Beamish
- Born: 27 September 1903; Dunmanway, County Cork, Ireland
- Died: 28 March 1942 (aged 38); English Channel, near Calais, occupied France
- Military career
- Allegiance: United Kingdom
- Branch: Royal Air Force
- Service years: 1921–1933; 1937–1942
- Rank: Group Captain
- Service number: 16089
- Commands: RAF Kenley (1942); RAF Debden (1941); RAF North Weald (1940–41); No. 504 Squadron RAF (1938–40); No. 64 Squadron RAF (1937–38)
- Conflicts: Second World War: Battle of Britain; Circus offensive
- Awards: Distinguished Service Order & Bar; Distinguished Flying Cross; Air Force Cross; Mentioned in Despatches

Group Captain Francis Victor Beamish, DSO & Bar, DFC, AFC (27 September 1903 – 28 March 1942) was an Irish-born Royal Air Force fighter pilot and flying ace of the Second World War. After flying during the Battle of Britain he continued to lead fighter operations until he was killed in action in 1942.

== Early life ==
Beamish was born at Dunmanway in County Cork, Ireland, on 27 September 1903, the oldest son of Francis George Beamish, a schoolmaster, and Mary Elizabeth Beamish. Initially educated locally, from 1913 to 1921, he went to Coleraine Academical Institution. He was captain of the facility's senior rugby team for the final two years of his education.

== Royal Air Force career ==
Beamish entered the Royal Air Force's Cranwell College at Cranwell as a flight cadet in September 1921. Graduating in August 1923, he was granted a permanent commission as a pilot officer with effect from 15 August. The following month he was posted to No. 4 Squadron, an army-co-operation unit, at Farnborough. In early 1925 Beamish was posted to the School of Army Co-operation at Old Sarum, subsequently being promoted to flying officer.

Towards the end of the year, Beamish was posted to British India, joining No. 31 Squadron at Ambala. He transferred to No. 60 Squadron at Kohat in April 1926. Returning to England in October, Beamish participated in a course at the Central Flying School at Wittering before commencing a tour as an instructor at No. 5 Flying Training School at Sealand.

Beamish played rugby union for Harlequins, Leicester, Hampshire, Royal Air Force and Irish Trials for several years. He was the eldest of the Beamish brothers who were all accomplished sportsmen and RAF officers; his brothers being George, Charles and Cecil.

In September 1927 Beamish returned to Cranwell College as a member of the staff. He was promoted flight lieutenant late the following year. Beamish was posted to Canada in March 1929 on an exchange with the Royal Canadian Air Force, where he worked in training and development of an aerobatics display team. During his time in Canada he developed pleurisy. On his return to the United Kingdom two years later, he was posted to No. 25 Squadron at Hawkinge as a flight commander. In January 1932 he was appointed personal assistant to the Air Officer Commanding (AOC) at Uxbridge. By 1933, his pleurisy worsened into tuberculosis and he was hospitalised. He reluctantly relinquished his commission in the RAF in October 1933 due to ill-health.

In 1934 Beamish secured a civilian post at No. 2 Flying Training School RAF Digby which he held until appointed civilian adjutant at RAF Aldergrove on 18 May 1936 simultaneously being granted a commission as flight lieutenant in the Reserve of Air Force Officers. A notice in the London Gazette in February 1937 recorded that Flight Lieutenant Francis Victor Beamish (RAF retired) had been reinstated on the active list as a flight lieutenant with effect from 27 January 1937 (with seniority dated 23 March 1932, having relinquished his commission with the Reserve of Air Force Officers, Having recovered his health he was reinstated with full flying status and posted to command No. 2 Armament Training Camp and then the Meteorological Flight at RAF Aldergrove. He was appointed to command No. 64 Squadron RAF at RAF Church Fenton on 8 December 1937.

Squadron Leader Beamish served as Honorary Aide-de-Camp representing the Royal Air Force on the staff of the Governor of Northern Ireland from 6 April 1937 until 6 January 1938.

Beamish was awarded the Air Force Cross on 1 January 1938, for his work in the formation of the "Met Flight".

== Second World War ==
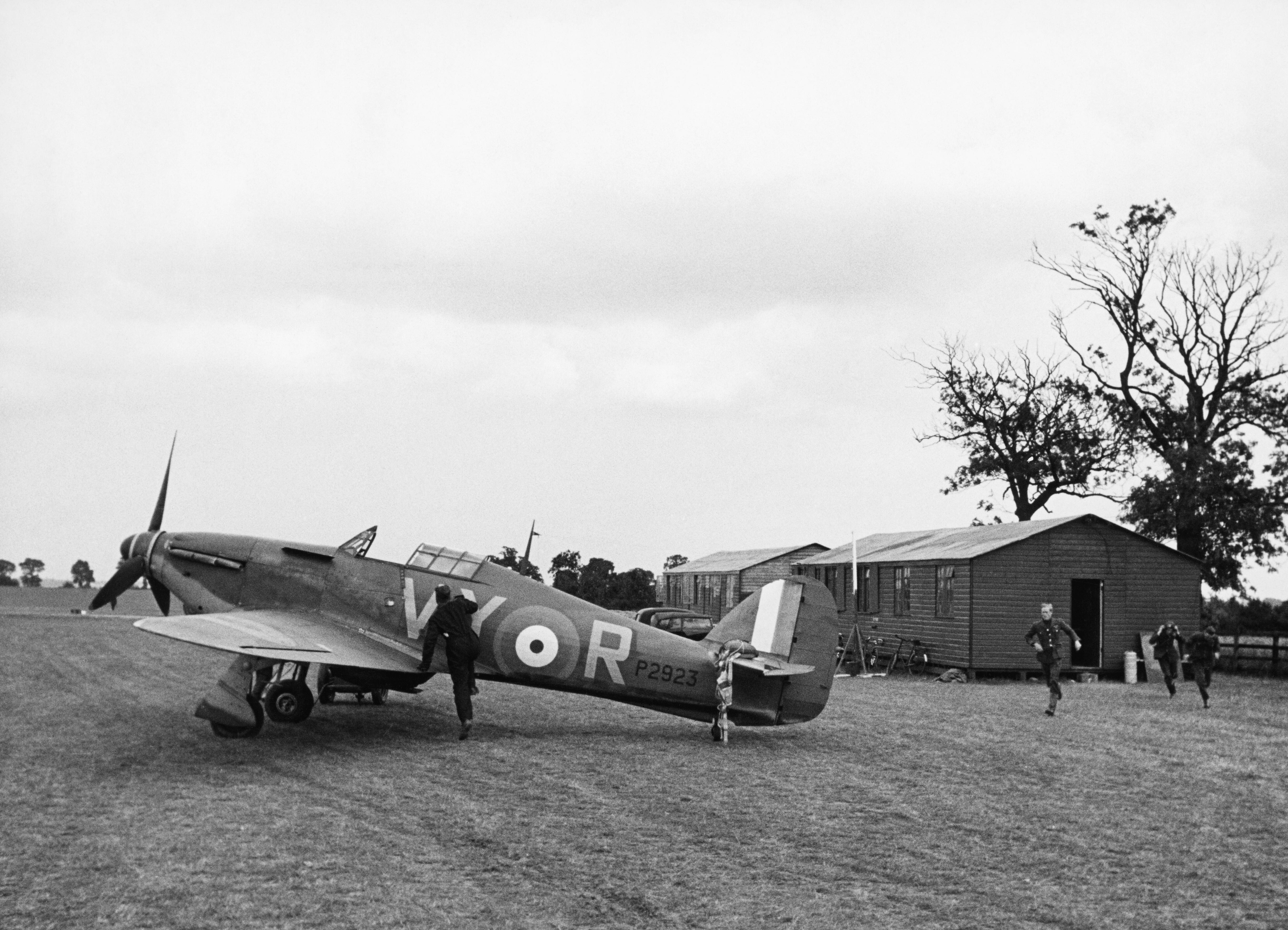
Hawker Hurricane during the Battle of Britain.

Beamish completed a course at RAF Staff College, Andover and was appointed to command No. 504 Squadron RAF at RAF Digby on 13 September 1939 before sailing to Canada in January 1940 on staff duty, he was Mentioned in Despatches on 20 February 1940 for his service in command. Beamish was promoted Wing Commander on 1 March 1940, and returned to England assuming command of RAF North Weald on 7 June 1940.

=== Battle of Britain ===
As evidenced by his tally as a fighter pilot he took every opportunity to fly operationally. On 18 June 1940 he claimed two Messerschmitt Bf 109s fighters destroyed, on 9 July 1940 one Messerschmitt Bf 110 heavy fighter damaged, then on 12 July 1940 a Dornier Do 17 bomber shot down. Beamish was awarded the Distinguished Service Order (DSO) on 23 July 1940, when his citation stated:

Wing Commander Beamish took over command of a Royal Air Force station after two squadrons there had been intensively engaged in successful fighting operations over France for thirteen days and personally led them on many patrols against the enemy. In June, 1940, during an offensive mission over France, six Messerschmitt Bf 109s were destroyed, two of them by Wing Commander Beamish himself and twelve driven off. One day recently he assisted in the destruction of a Messerschmitt Bf 110 whilst leading the escort to a convoy and three days later he shot down a Dornier Do 17. This officer's outstanding leadership and high courage have inspired all those under his command with great energy and dash.

— London Gazette, No. 34903, 23 July 1940

In action during the height of the Battle of Britain on 18 August 1940 Beamish claimed a probable Junkers Ju 88 bomber, on 24 August 1940 a Do 17 damaged and on 30 August 1940 two probable Bf 110s. On 6 September 1940 Beamish claimed two Junkers Ju 87 dive bombers, on 11 September 1940 a probable Heinkel He 111 bomber, on 15 September 1940 a shared He 111 and on 18 September 1940 and 27 September 1940 he scored probable Bf 109s. Beamish damaged a Bf 109 on 12 October 1940, on 25 October 1940 he probably destroyed a Bf 109 and damaged another and finally probably shooting down another on 30 October 1940.

On 7 November 1940 Beamish collided with Pilot Officer Tom Neil of No. 249 Squadron RAF whilst on patrol and made a forced-landing at Leeds Castle in Kent. The following day, it was announced in The London Gazette that Beamish had been awarded the Distinguished Flying Cross. The published citation read:

The work of this station commander has been outstanding. He has displayed exceptional keenness in his engagements against the enemy and has recently destroyed one and possibly a further seven enemy aircraft. His coolness and courage have proved an inspiration to all.

— London Gazette, No. 34987, 8 November 1940

In all his sorties in 1940, he was damaged by enemy action three times, on each occasion getting his aircraft down safely. On 11 November 1940 an attack was carried out by Italian aircraft based in Belgium during which Beamish claimed a probable Fiat CR.42 Falco bi-plane fighter. On 13 November 1940 he damaged a Bf 109 near Dover.

=== Circus offensive ===
On 10 January 1941 he shot down a Bf 109 but was posted to HQ No. 11 Group RAF on 17 March 1941. Beamish was unable to fly regularly by now but occasionally flew over occupied Europe and claimed a probable Bf 109 near Mardyck on 9 August. Beamish was awarded a Bar to the DSO on 2 September; his citation stated:

Group Captain Beamish commanded a Royal Air Force Station from October 1940 to March, 1941 and during that period carried out 71 operational sorties in which he destroyed an enemy fighter, probably destroyed three other hostile aircraft and damaged others. Since his appointment to Group headquarters he has taken part in further sorties and has probably destroyed two more enemy aircraft. The courage and devotion to duty displayed by Group Captain Beamish are of the highest order and he has set a magnificent example.

— London Gazette, No. 35263, 2 September 1941

Beamish was appointed to command RAF Kenley on 25 January 1942 and was able to fly more frequently with his squadrons. Accompanied by Wing Commander Robert Boyd he took off on the morning of 12 February on a reconnaissance flight during which they chased two Bf 109s before sighting part of the German Fleet making its 'Channel Dash'. The ships had been reported ten minutes earlier by two pilots of No. 91 Squadron RAF but the report had not been fully believed until such senior confirmation was received. Attacks were then planned. On 13 February Beamish shared in the destruction of a Heinkel He 115 float plane over the Channel. On 9 March, he claimed a Focke-Wulf Fw 190 fighter destroyed claiming a second one and a Bf 109 on 26 March 1942.

On 28 March, Beamish was flying with the New Zealand No. 485 Squadron, which operated from Kenley, on a sweep involving eight RAF squadrons along the French coast; the intention was to draw out Luftwaffe fighters. A formation of Fw 190s was sighted near Cap Griz Nez and in the engagement which followed, Beamish was attacked and damaged by a Fw 190. He requested a position over the radio and was last sighted crossing the French coast. Presumed to have crashed into the English Channel, he has no known grave and is commemorated on the Runneymeade Memorial at Englefield Green.

== Bibliography ==
- Shores, Christopher; Williams, Clive (1994). Aces High: A Tribute to the Most Notable Fighter Pilots of the British and Commonwealth Forces in WWII. London: Grub Street. ISBN 1-8-9869-7000.
- Thompson, H. L. (1953). New Zealanders with the Royal Air Force. Official History of New Zealand in the Second World War 1939–45. Vol. I. Wellington: War History Branch. OCLC 270919916.
- Wynn, Kenneth (1989). Men of the Battle of Britain. Norfolk: Gliddon. ISBN 1473847672.
