= Tumtum and Nutmeg =

First of a series of children's books by Emily Bearn (2008)

- First edition
- Author: Emily Bearn
- Illustrator: Nick Price
- Language: English
- Genre: Children's
- Publisher: EgmontUK; Little, Brown
- Publication date: 2008
- Publication place: United Kingdom
- Media type: Book
- ISBN: 978-0316027038
- OCLC: 262892538
- LC Class: PZ7.B38048 Tu 2009
- Followed by: The Great Escape, The Pirates' Treasure, The Christmas Adventure, The Seaside Adventure, A Circus Adventure, Trouble at Rose Cottage

Tumtum and Nutmeg is the first of a series of children's books by author Emily Bearn. The book is about Tumtum and Nutmeg Nutmouse who live in Nutmouse Hall, situated within the broom cupboard of Rose Cottage. It was first published in January 2008. The other books in the series include The Great Escape, The Pirates' Treasure, A Christmas Adventure, A Seaside Adventure, A Circus Adventure and Trouble at Rose Cottage.

== Synopsis ==
Mr and Mrs Nutmouse (respectively: Tumtum and Nutmeg) live in Nutmouse Hall a grand house (for mice) secreted within the broom cupboard of Rose Cottage. Rose Cottage is the home of a human family: Mr Walter Mildew and his children, Arthur and Lucy. Mr Mildew is an inventor and is struggling to maintain the family while he develops his latest invention, a mechanical mouse that cleans. Due to their father's absent-mindedness and financial situation, Rose Cottage is in poor repair and Arthur and Lucy wear threadbare clothes and are frequently hungry.

Nutmeg begins, with Tumtum's help, to help take care of the children. Using the cover of "Nutmeg, a Fairy of Sorts", Nutmeg cleans the attic in which the children sleep and mends their clothes while Tumtum makes repairs to both the room and the children's toys. The children repay Nutmeg's kindness by leaving treats for them in the doll's house.

Things change when Aunt Ivy comes to stay while her home in Scotland is being fumigated for mice (which she hates). After a chance sighting of Tumtum and Nutmeg, Ivy poisons Tumtum (though not fatally) and makes plans to gas Nutmouse Hall. In desperation Nutmeg enlists the help of General Marchmouse, a recently retired member of the mouse army. Marchmouse, with much unacknowledged help from Nutmeg, formulates a plan to drive Ivy from the house via a massed charge of the village mice.

== Characters ==
- Tumtum (Mr Nutmouse) - A rotund mouse, owner of Nutmouse Hall.
- Nutmeg (Mrs Nutmouse) - Wife of Tumtum, Nutmeg secretly takes care of the Mildew children who think of her as a "Fairy of Sorts".
- Walter Mildew - Owner of Rose Cottage. An inventor fallen on hard times.
- Arthur and Lucy Mildew - The Mildew children who sleep in the attic and are secretly cared for by Tumtum and Nutmeg.
- Aunt Ivy - Mr Mildew's sister-in-law. A nasty, vindictive and overbearing woman who comes to stay with the Mildews. Ivy is terrified of mice.
- General Marchmouse - An officious though good-hearted recently retired officer of the mouse army.
