= George Beamish =

British Lions & Ireland International and Royal Air Force officer (1905-1967)

- Born: George Robert Beamish; 29 April 1905 Dunmanway, Ireland
- Died: 13 November 1967 (aged 62) Castlerock, Northern Ireland
- School: Coleraine Academical Institution
- Notable relative: Charles Beamish (brother)

Rugby union career
- Position: No. 8
Senior career
Years	Team	Apps	(Points)
- Coleraine
1924–1933	Leicester Tigers	118	(74)
- London Irish
- RAF
1928	Barbarians	1	(0)
International career
Years	Team	Apps	(Points)
1925–1933	Ireland	25	(12)
1930	British Isles	5	(0)
- Military career
- Allegiance: United Kingdom
- Branch: Royal Air Force
- Service years: 1923–58
- Rank: Air Marshal
- Commands: Technical Training Command (1955–58); Transport Command (1954–55); Air Headquarters Iraq (1950–52); Royal Air Force College Cranwell (1949–50); No. 45 Group (1945–46); No. 44 Group (1943–45)
- Conflicts: Second World War
- Awards: Knight Commander of the Order of the Bath; Commander of the Order of the British Empire; Mentioned in Despatches (2); Gold Cross of the Royal Order of George I (Greece); Officer of the Legion of Merit (United States)

Air Marshal Sir George Robert Beamish, KCB, CBE (29 April 1905 – 13 November 1967) was a senior commander in the Royal Air Force from the Second World War to his retirement in the late 1950s. Prior to the Second World War, while Beamish was in the RAF, he was a keen rugby union player, playing for Leicester and being capped 26 times for Ireland and was selected for the 1930 British Lions tour. He was also the chairman of the RAF Rugby Union and an Air Force rugby selector.

== Personal history ==
George Beamish was born in Dunmanway, Ireland on 29 April 1905. He attended the Coleraine Academical Institution and he and his three younger brothers, Victor, Charles and Cecil were all accomplished sportsmen and went on to join the RAF, Charles also being capped by Ireland.

From 1923 Beamish attended the RAF College, Cranwell as a flight cadet and after he was commissioned in late 1924, Beamish was posted as a pilot on No. 100 Squadron. In 1934 he was made Flight Commander of No. 45 Squadron and in 1936 he was made Squadron Leader.

After attending RAF Staff College in 1937 he was attached to the Air Staff. In 1939 he was made Senior Operations Officer for Palestine and Transjordan. On 17 May 1941 he was appointed senior RAF officer on Crete overseeing the reception of units after their withdrawal from Greece. To aid him in this task he was allocated two RAF squadrons from Egypt, 30 and 205 to bolster the fighters already stationed on the island. But following the German Invasion of Crete this action turned into the defence of the island. Unable to convince the Army Commander of the need to defeat the invaders from the air, the island fell and Beamish ordered the RAF squadrons to withdraw to Egypt on 19 May. Beamish remained on Crete to assist General Freyberg, both men escaping the island aboard a Sunderland in late May. He was then appointed Senior Air Staff Officer first at Western Desert Air Force, then at North African Tactical Air Forces and then at Second Tactical Air Force before progressing to the roles of Air Officer Commanding No. 44 Group and then No. 45 Group.

After the war he became President of the RAF Selection Board and then Director of Weapons at the Air Ministry in 1947. He went on to be Commandant of the Royal Air Force College Cranwell in 1949, Air Officer Commanding, Air Headquarters Iraq in 1950 and Director-General of Personnel in 1952. His last appointments were as Air Officer Commanding-in-Chief at Transport Command in 1954 and Air Officer Commanding-in-Chief at Technical Training Command in 1955. In 1955, Beamish was appointed a Knight Commander of the Order of the Bath. He retired in 1958.

In 1962 he was made High Sheriff of County Londonderry.

== Rugby career ==
Beamish won his first international cap in 1925, at the age of 19, representing Ireland in that year's Home Nations Championship in a six all draw with England. At the time he was representing Coleraine at club level. Beamish was then selected for the remaining games of the tournament, a home loss to Scotland and an impressive 19–3 win over Wales. During the 1927–28 season, and now playing club rugby for Leicester, Beamish was approached to play for invitational touring team the Barbarians.

In 1928, nearly three years after his last international game, Beamish was recalled to the Ireland team. From the first game of the 1928 Five Nations Championship until the end of the 1933 tournament Beamish was rarely out of the squad. In 1930 Beamish was selected for the British Isles team on their tour of Australia and New Zealand. He played in all five Tests and 17 of the regional matches, scoring two tries, one each against Otago and a joint Marlborough/Nelson Bay team.

After the British tour Beamish returned to the Ireland squad for the 1931 Championship playing in all four games. He was then selected as Ireland team captain when the team faced the 1931 touring South African team in Dublin. He retained the captaincy for the 1932 Home Nations Championship, and steered Ireland to their first Championship win for twenty years. The 1933 campaign was Beamish's last for Ireland, playing in all three games and captaining the team in a win over Wales. During his career, Beamish also played club rugby for London Irish and was captain of the RAF rugby side.

George Beamish is also credited with getting the green of Ireland represented in the kit currently worn by the British & Irish Lions. On the 1930 tour to New Zealand, of which he was a member, the tourists wore what was by then the standard blue jerseys. These themselves caused some controversy because the New Zealand side, by then already synonymous with the appellation "All Blacks", had an all black kit that clashed with the Lions' blue. After much reluctance and debate, but having to defer to the rugby custom of accommodating guests, New Zealand agreed to change for the Tests and the All Blacks became the All Whites for the first time. Also on that tour, a delegation led by George Beamish expressed their displeasure at the fact that whilst the blue of Scotland, white of England and red of Wales were represented in the strip there was no green for Ireland. A green flash was added to the socks, which from 1938 became a green turnover and that has remained a feature of the strip ever since.

Military offices
Preceded by Richard Atcherley	RAF College Commandant; 1949–1950	Succeeded by Laurence Sinclair
Preceded by Sir Charles Guest	Commander-in-Chief Transport Command; 1954–1955	Succeeded by Sir Andrew McKee
Preceded by Sir Victor Groom	Commander-in-Chief Technical Training Command; 1955–1958	Succeeded by Sir Arthur McDonald
