= Jabberwocky (musical) =

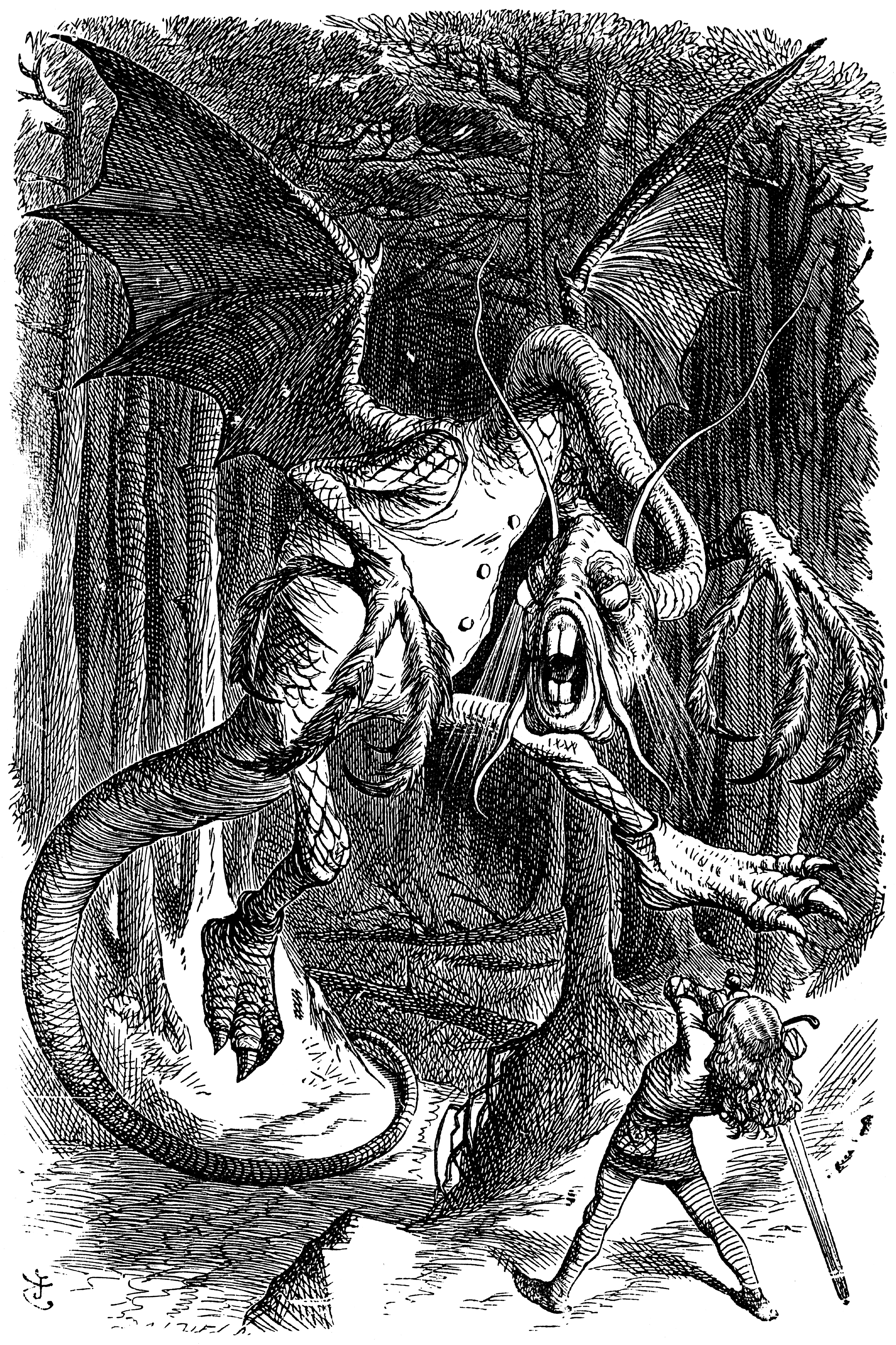
- Music: Conceived and written by Andrew Kay, Malcolm Middleton & Peter Phillips, with additional material by Rick Best, Robert Kay, Marian Arnold & Phil Young, band arrangements by Rick Best & Phil Young
- Basis: "Jabberwocky", an 1872 poem by Lewis Carroll
- Productions: 1973, 1978 Sydney; 1974 Perth; 1975 Adelaide; 1979 Melbourne

Jabberwocky, an adult pantomime by Andrew Kay, Malcolm Middleton and Peter Phillips, is a musical based on the English 1871 poem of the same name by Lewis Carroll. The music, book and lyrics are by Malcolm Middleton, Andrew Kay and Peter Philips, with additional material by Robert Kay and by many members of the original cast.

The plot takes the form of a quest, in which the Son searches for the Jabberwock and ultimately kills it. Jabberwocky was originally presented at the Union Theatre, University of Sydney, in March, 1973.

== Background ==
The show was originally conceived by Malcolm Middleton OAM and Peter Phillips—both architecture students and members of Sydney University Musical Society at the time—as a stage play set design exercise accompanied by a structure for the play and two songs.

It is set in a mythical, unnamed village and forest. With the exception of the Squire and the Lady, the characters are taken from the poem—slithy toves, Jubjub bird, and the like—and none of them have names. Even the principal character is known only as "Son".

Other plot elements also are derived from mentions in the poem, such as the vorpal sword and the tumtum tree, and words like manxome and frumious are casually used by characters in their dialogue.

Because of the mythical nature of the scenario, there is considerable scope for designers of sets and costumes to use imagination.

It was a major production of the inaugural Come Out Youth Arts Festival, Adelaide, 1975. It has since become popular with high schools.

== Synopsis ==
=== Brillig ===
The show begins with a scene-setting wordless prologue, "Brillig", which introduces the mythical characters, the mimsy borogoves, the slithy toves, and the mome raths.

The name "Brillig" comes from the first line of the poem.

=== Act 1 ===
"Jabberwocky" proper starts in a village with townsfolk going about their business ("Thinking of you every day"). The Father and Son appear and it appears that the Father is trying to give his son some life education, or as he puts it, "how to become a man". The Son quite misunderstands the rather unclear message and decides that he must go on a quest. This he will do with the Squire, and when he returns, he will be married to the Lady, who is asked to sing the townsfolks’ favourite song, "in the ancient tongue" ("Der Jammerwoch"). Hearing the story of the Jabberwock, the Son decides that it will be the object of his quest.

The Father, Son, Lady and townsfolk wish him well ("Cliché song"), and when all have left the stage, the heralds appear in a musical interlude and sing about his adventures on his quest ("Search for a legend").

The Son and Squire travel and meet the mimsy borogoves, who sing their national anthem ("Borogovia"). The borogoves explain that the Jabberwock is to be found in the Tulgey Wood ("I've never been there") and that to kill a Jabberwock, the weapon needed is a vorpal sword ("Ballad of the vorpal blade").

The Son and Squire next encounter the slithy toves ("Gimble"), who try to persuade them to abandon the quest and stay with them. But they decide to continue the quest and the mimsy borogoves and slithy toves encourage them in a large-scale production number ("Tulgey Wood").

The Son and Squire encounter a stream, from which the Squire suggests the Son drink ("Mystical Stream"). The Son collapses and the Squire departs.

The Jubjub Bird enters ("Dreamsong"), the Son wakes up and the two fall in love ("Ballad Duet (In the Twilight)") but suddenly, a cloaked figure (in fact, the Squire) abducts the Jubjub Bird as the Act 1 Finale ("What was he to do?") begins. Towards the end of the finale, the Son glimpses the vorpal sword, which is just out of reach. Mome raths enter and capture the Son and the sword.

=== Act 2 ===
Act 2 opens with a song ("Gribe-Out") by the mome raths and the Momest Rath. It becomes clear the raths and the Squire are the servants of the Bandersnatch ("Bandersnatch") who dismisses the raths ("There's no raths like mome").

The Bandersnatch and Squire taunt the captive Son and Jubjub Bird ("Torture Tango") but they escape by means of a coup de théâtre; the chains securing the Son and the Jubjub Bird fall away and a crazy chase ensues, culminating with their escape. The heralds recapitulate the story so far ("A vorpal hit").

At this point, the relationship between the Son and the Jubjub Bird starts to break down. The Son, urged on by the toves and borogoves ("A question of survival") and remembering the old song, is convinced that the Jabberwock is dangerous but the Jubjub Bird points out that there is no evidence for this and that the old song has already proved inaccurate in its injunction to "beware the Jubjub Bird" ("Rejection song"). But the Jabberwock makes its appearance and the Son kills it with the vorpal sword. As soon as he does so, he seems to realise that he has made a mistake.

The Son returns to the village where he is greeted with great acclaim ("Finale (There's just no doubt about it)"), but he wanders disconsolately among the folk and his eventual departure is not noticed.

=== Gillirb ===
The show ends with a wordless epilogue, named "Gillirb". The name "Gillirb" is the result of word play, being "Brillig" spelt backwards.

== Themes ==
The show eschews the traditional happy ending as it suggests that slaying the Jabberwock has had some unknowable but undesirable effect on the ecology of the environment. It therefore has a surprisingly modern attitude to conservation, which as a movement was only fledgling in 1973 when the musical "Jabberwocky" was written.

It is also a coming-of-age tale; the Son seems to have made a terrible and irretrievable mistake in the process of learning about growing up.

== Musical numbers ==
Overture

Music	Performer(s)
"Brillig"	Pre-recorded electronic music. Commissioned for the Perth production, 1974.

Act 1

Music	Performer(s)
"Thinking of you every day"	Chorus of townsfolk.
"Der Jammerwoch"	The Lady sings the poem "Jabberwocky" in a German realisation (represented in the script as "the ancient tongue"). The Son and Squire enter with a counter-melody.
"Cliché song"	Father, Son, Lady, townsfolk. The song contains many verbal and musical clichés.
"Search for a legend"	Heralds.
"Borogovia"	Borogoves. The Borogovian "national anthem".
"I've never been there"	Mimsiest Borogove, Son.
"Ballad of the vorpal blade"	Borogoves.
"Gimble"	Toves.
"Tulgey Wood"	Son, Squire, toves, borogoves.
"Mystical stream"	Band.
"Dreamsong"	Jubjub Bird.
"Ballad duet (In the Twilight)"	Toves.
"Act 1 Finale (What was he to do?)"	Chorus and off-stage choir.

Act 2

Music	Performer(s)
"Gribe-out"	Momest Rath, chorus of mome raths.
"Bandersnatch"	Bandersnatch.
"There's no raths like mome"	Mome raths.
"Torture tango"	Squire.
"A vorpal hit"	Heralds.
"A question of survival"	Son, toves, borogoves, raths. Not in the original production but added for the Perth production.
"Rejection song"	Jubjub Bird, Son.
"Finale (There's just no doubt about it)"	Father, Lady, townsfolk. Also not in the original production which featured a Handelian-style oratorio "O Frabjous Day". This proved unwieldy and was dropped in favour of this reprise style finale.

Epilogue

Music	Performer(s)
"Gillirb"	Pre-recorded electronic music. Commissioned for the Perth production, 1974.

== Characters ==
Listed in the order in which they appear.

Character	Description
Chorus of mimsy borogoves	Mixed chorus. The name "mimsy borogove" comes direct from the poem.
Chorus of slithy toves	Female chorus. The name "slithy tove" comes direct from the poem.
Chorus of mome raths	Male chorus. Unpleasant creatures whose attitudes are summarized in the song "Gribe-out". The name "mome rath" comes direct from the poem.
Chorus of townsfolk	Mixed chorus.
Son	Light baritone.
Father	Blustering and ineffectual.
Squire	Tenor. This character is not mentioned in the poem.
Lady	Soprano. The Son is to be betrothed to the Lady after successful completion of the quest. This character is not mentioned in the poem.
Chorus of heralds	Mixed chorus. The heralds are not mentioned in the poem.
Mimsiest Borogove	Tenor or Contralto. The leader of the chorus of mimsy borogoves.
Slithiest Tove	Soprano. The leader of the chorus of slithy toves.
Jubjub Bird	Soprano. The spirit of the Tulgey Wood.
Momest Rath	The leader of the chorus of mome raths.
Bandersnatch	An evil creature who lives in the Tulgey Wood. Played camp.
The Jabberwock	The Jabberwock is usually suggested by stage effects.

== Band ==
Instruments:

Piano

Alto Sax/Clarinet

Tenor Sax/Clarinet

Tenor Sax/Flute/Clarinet

Trumpets × 3

Trombones × 2

Percussion

Electronic effects

== Productions ==
=== Original Sydney production, 1973 ===
Presented at the Union Theatre, University of Sydney, in March, 1973.

=== Perth production, 1974 ===
Presented by University of Western Australia Undergraduate Choral Society, who commissioned the electronic music "Brillig" and "Gillirb". The vocal score was prepared after this production.

=== Adelaide production, 1975 ===
The lavish professional production in Adelaide in 1975 was presented by the inaugural Come Out Youth Arts Festival.

=== Sydney revival production, 1978 ===
This was staged in the now-defunct St James Theatre, Phillip Street, Sydney.

=== Melbourne production, 1979 ===
Presented by Melbourne University Choral Society at the Union Theatre, University of Melbourne, in May, 1979.

=== Other ===
There have been several productions by high schools and amateur companies in Perth, in regional South Australia and Western Australia, and in Auckland.

== Recordings ==
The 1973 and 1974 productions were recorded.

== See also ==
- Lists of musicals
