= Campbell College =

Location
- Belmont Road; Belfast, BT4 2ND; Northern Ireland; 54°36′07″N 5°50′57″W

Information
- Type: Voluntary Grammar School; Fee-Paying Preparatory Department
- Motto: Ne Obliviscaris (Lest We Forget)
- Religious affiliation: Non-denominational but religious services are based on Christianity
- Established: 1894
- Founder: Henry James Campbell
- Status: Open
- Local authority: Voluntary school – independent education authority
- Head teacher: Mr Jonathan Anderson
- Staff: ~70
- Gender: Boys
- Age: 4 to 18
- Enrolment: Grammar School (Y8-14); 985 (2024/25); Prep Dept (P1-7); 181 (2024/25); Total; 1,166 (2024/25)
- Houses: Day Houses; Alden's; Allison's; Davis's; Dobbin's; Price's; Yate's; Boarding Houses; School House
- Colour
- Publication: The Campbellian, The Insider (school magazines)
- School fees: 2025/26; Day School; Year 8-14: £3,932 (per annum); Boarding (Per Term); Years 8-14 (UK/IE): £7,966; Years 8-14 (EU): £9,218; Years 8-14 (Other): £11,172; Boarding (Per Annum); Years 8-14 (UK/IE): £23,897; Years 8-14 (EU): £27,654; Years 8-14 (Other): £33,517; Kindergarten £8.25 per hour Junior School; Prep 1-7: £7,321 (per annum); UK/IE/EU/Other refers to the child's nationality
- Alumni: Old Campbellians ("OCs")
- Website: http://www.campbellcollege.co.uk/

Campbell College located in Belfast, Northern Ireland, and founded in 1894 comprises a preparatory school department (junior age) and a senior Northern Ireland voluntary grammar school, the latter meaning, in terms of provision of education, a government-funded, selective secondary school.

The school is one of a number of schools in the state-funded grammar sector in Northern Ireland which can offer paid boarding places to some pupils, typically to be funded by the pupil, although most pupils are dayboys.

It is one of the eight schools of Northern Ireland represented on the Headmasters' and Headmistresses' Conference and is a member of the Independent Schools Council.

== Legal status ==
Campbell College is one of very few voluntary grammar schools in Northern Ireland entitled to be classified as a 'Voluntary B' grammar school, where most voluntary grammars within this state sector are 'Voluntary A'. Voluntary grammar schools, though state schools by educational funding, are each managed by independent educational charities on the privately owned grounds and infrastructure of those charities. The College's 'Voluntary B' designation enables this grammar school, which is state funded for education provision, to charge a degree of fees to pupils, separate completely to the education process, officially termed the "capital fee".

The capital fees charged to the grammar school pupils are purely for the upkeep of historic buildings and grounds and not for any part of the education. (Voluntary 'B' grammars receive much less state capital funding for physical upkeep than other voluntary grammars.) At Campbell College the schooling itself in the grammar school does not come under fee-paying terms. In common with all other Northern Ireland grammar schools of all types, the schooling itself is taxpayer funded per pupil through the government authority for those successful in admission within the school's own selection process.

== Location ==
The school occupies a 100-acre (40-hectare) estate in east Belfast, close to the Parliament Buildings at Stormont. All the school's facilities are located on this site, which also contains a small lake and forest named Netherleigh.

Campbell's junior school – formerly located on an adjacent site and called Cabin Hill – is now also located on the site. The school has the oldest Combined Cadet Force in Northern Ireland, with over 400 cadets. The school has an international reputation and attracts boarders from all over the world.

== History ==
It was founded in 1894 with a bequest by Henry James Campbell, who made his fortune in the linen trade, and left money to found a school based on the values of a Liberal Protestant education. Initially the school was primarily a boarding school but it has, particularly since the 1970s, become primarily a day school; in 2009 it had 879 pupils, only about 85 (10%) of whom were boarders. As a selective independent school, it admits pupils based on academic selection. Until 2006 pupils began at the school at age 11, but since the closure of the school's separate preparatory school, Cabin Hill, the school has accepted pupils from age 4 into the newly built Junior School, and both boys and girls into the school's kindergarten located on the school's grounds. The Latin motto of the school is Ne Obliviscaris ("Do Not Forget").

In 1935 Jimmy Steele led an attempted Irish Republican Army raid on the school to secure the arms inside the college Officers' Training Corps. The RUC at Strandtown was tipped off and the raid was unsuccessful. A gun battle took place at the gate lodge on Hawthornden Road in which Constable Ian Hay received five gunshot wounds, but survived. In 1936 Steele and three other IRA members were captured, prosecuted and imprisoned in Crumlin Road Gaol.

Campbell lost 126 former students in World War I. During World War II the school was requisitioned by the War Office as a hospital, with the pupils transferred to Portrush, north Antrim. There are separate memorials to the dead of both World Wars in the Central Hall.

On 1st June 1951 the Queen Elizabeth (latterly the Queen Mother) and Princess Margaret (deputising for King George VI) visited Campbell to present the College with the Royal Charter in recognition of this sacrifice. The College motto Ne Obliviscaris ("Do Not Forget") remains to this day and was most evident in 2018 when the College marked the centenary of the end of WW1 with a poignant heritage project entitled, ‘The Men Behind the Glass’ remembering the 126 pupils and one member of staff who died in WWI.

The author C.S. Lewis, who grew up nearby, attended the school for two months, but was withdrawn because of a serious respiratory illness and sent to Malvern (Cherbourg School), famous at the time for treating people with lung problems. The gas lamppost on the school drive is claimed to have been the inspiration for that mentioned in Lewis' The Lion, the Witch and the Wardrobe, though some sources state a lamppost in Crawfordsburn Country Park was the inspiration. Still others believe that the gas lamps in the lower area of the woods on the Malvern Hills above the town were his inspiration. Lewis claimed in his autobiography Surprised by Joy that Campbell retained the character of an English public school before to the reforms of Arnold.

Several Campbell students have been involved in filmmaking. These include William MacQuitty (A Night to Remember), Andrew Eaton (Resurrection Man), Nick Hamm (The Hole), Dudi Appleton (The Most Fertile Man in Ireland), and Mark Huffam (Saving Private Ryan). A collection of Lepidoptera by Thomas Workman is displayed in the school.

On 27 October 2016 the President of Ireland, Michael D. Higgins, visited Linen Hall Library for the first time. A choir combining students from Holy Cross Boys' Primary School and Campbell College performed at the special event.

During 2018, the college began an extended project provided by the National Lottery and the Heritage Lottery Fund. The Men Behind the Glass was established in order to commemorate and remember the 127 pupils and staff who gave their lives during the First World War. It involved to imbedding of over 100 photographs of the young men of the college who died; these photos will be preserved forever with help from PRONI. An exhibition and website were also established as part of the project to tell the stories of the extraordinary Old Cambellians. To mark the 100th anniversary of Armistice Sunday, the school also produced a musical of the same title as the project. The production was written by Mrs Elizabeth McIlvenny (head of drama, in the college) in cooperation with Dr David Catherwood (previous head of music and composer in residence). McIlvenny wrote the script while Catherwood composed the music. The production was a huge success with 3 performances seeing an audience of over 600 people.

== School houses ==
Currently there are six houses for day boys and one boarding house, which form the focus for participation across the curriculum. School houses are named after former masters and others associated with the history of the school. The names of the houses and their respective colours are:

- Alden's (dark green)
- Allison's (light green, formerly brown)
- Davis's (yellow)
- Dobbin's (light blue)
- Price's (dark blue)
- School (boarding house) (black)
- Yates's (red)

Each house is run by a "house master" who is in charge of managing the house and overseeing the "house tutors", all of whom have allocated year groups for which they are responsible. Each house has a designated student who is "head of house", and they usually have a deputy. However, this is not always the case. The head of house, along with his deputy are sixth form students who have earned responsibility within the school, and it is common place for them to also be prefects, or so called "peer mentors". These two students organise house sporting, charity and dramatic events, among various other things.

== Uniform ==
School colours are black and white and/or green if one is awarded major honours (in a sport, activity or roles in school) which enables one to also acquire a green blazer, with the reason for the green blazer and year awarded embroidered on breast pocket under the badge and a black and white tie accompanied by an optional green pullover. The school uniform consists of a black badged blazer, House tie (with colour representing house), black trousers, black shoes with an optional V-neck pullover or quarter zip.

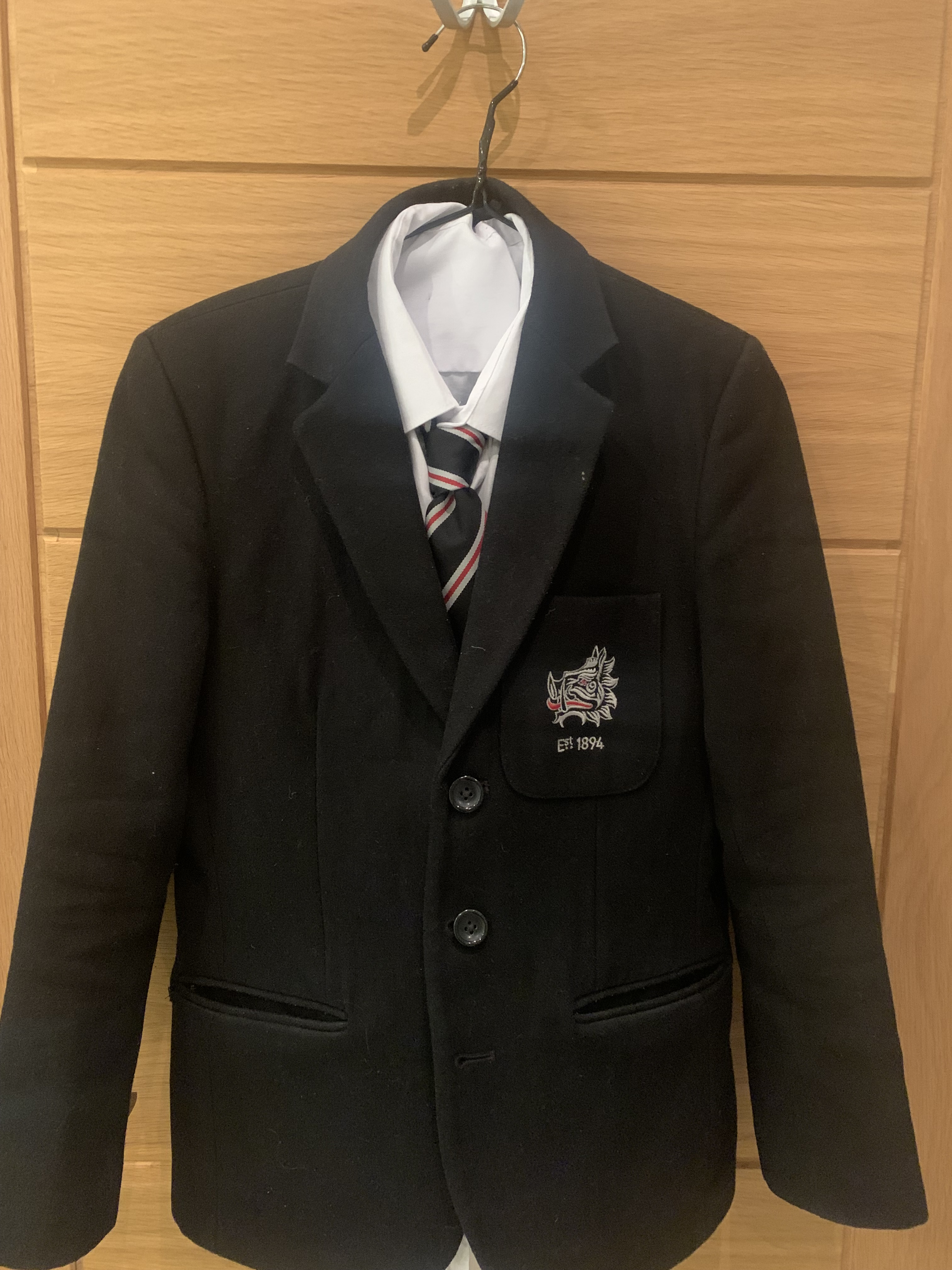
Campbell College uniform

== Sport ==
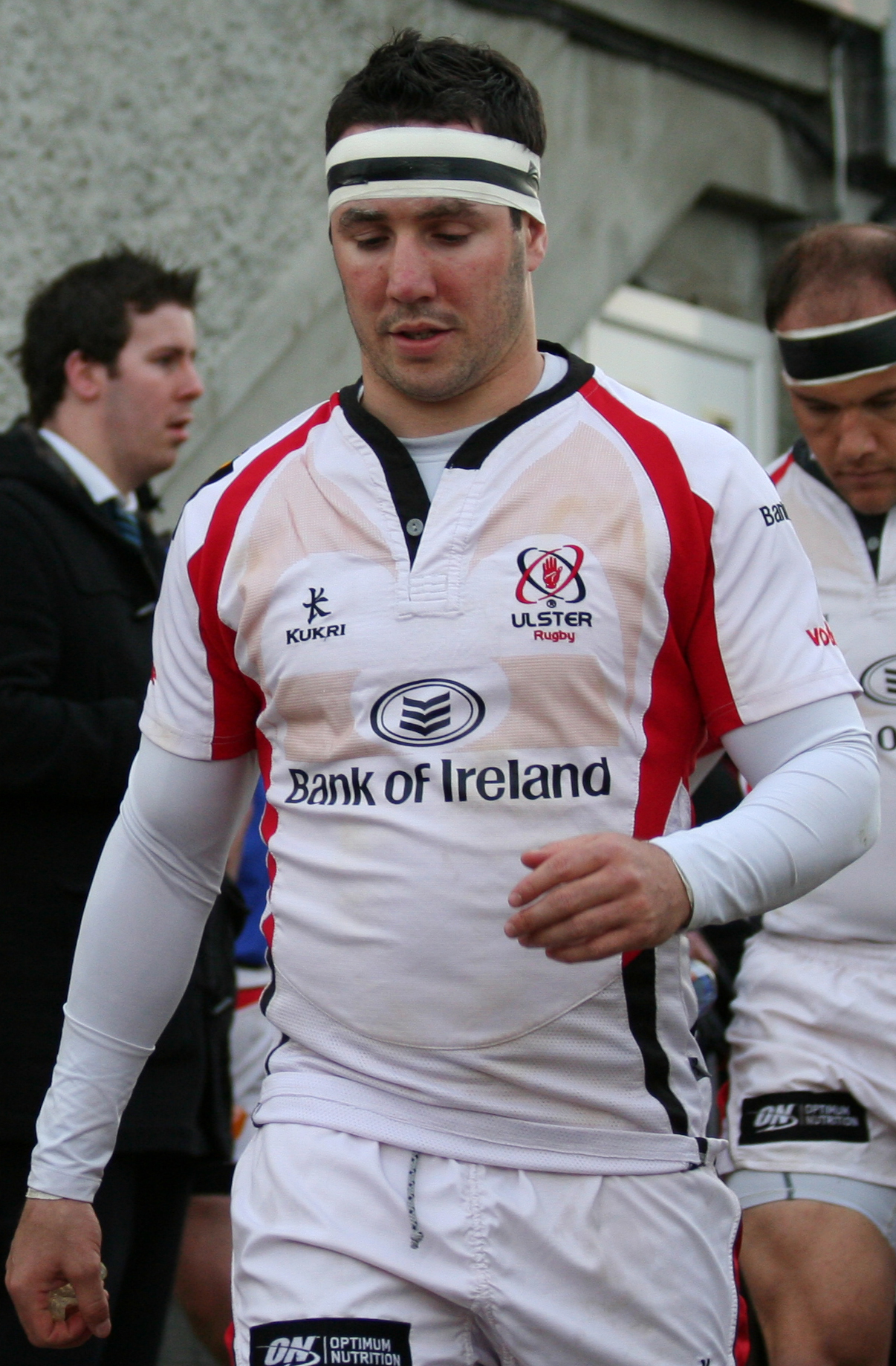
Paddy Wallace, past pupil of Campbell College and Ulster rugby player

The school's record in rugby includes winning the Ulster Schools Cup 25 times and sharing the cup four times. Their most recent success was in 2026, beating traditional rivals RBAI 26-22 at Ravenhill Stadium, in the cup's 150th year. The Campbell College sports facilities include rugby and football pitches, two water based hockey pitches, a 25-metre indoor shooting range, four tennis courts, squash courts and a fitness suite. The 2006 opening of the new synthetic hockey pitches was marked with an exhibition match between the gold-winning 1988 Summer Olympics Great Britain and Northern Ireland hockey team and the school's 1st XI, which ended 3–2 to the Olympic champions of old. The Campbellians Hockey Club play at this venue.

== Notable alumni ==
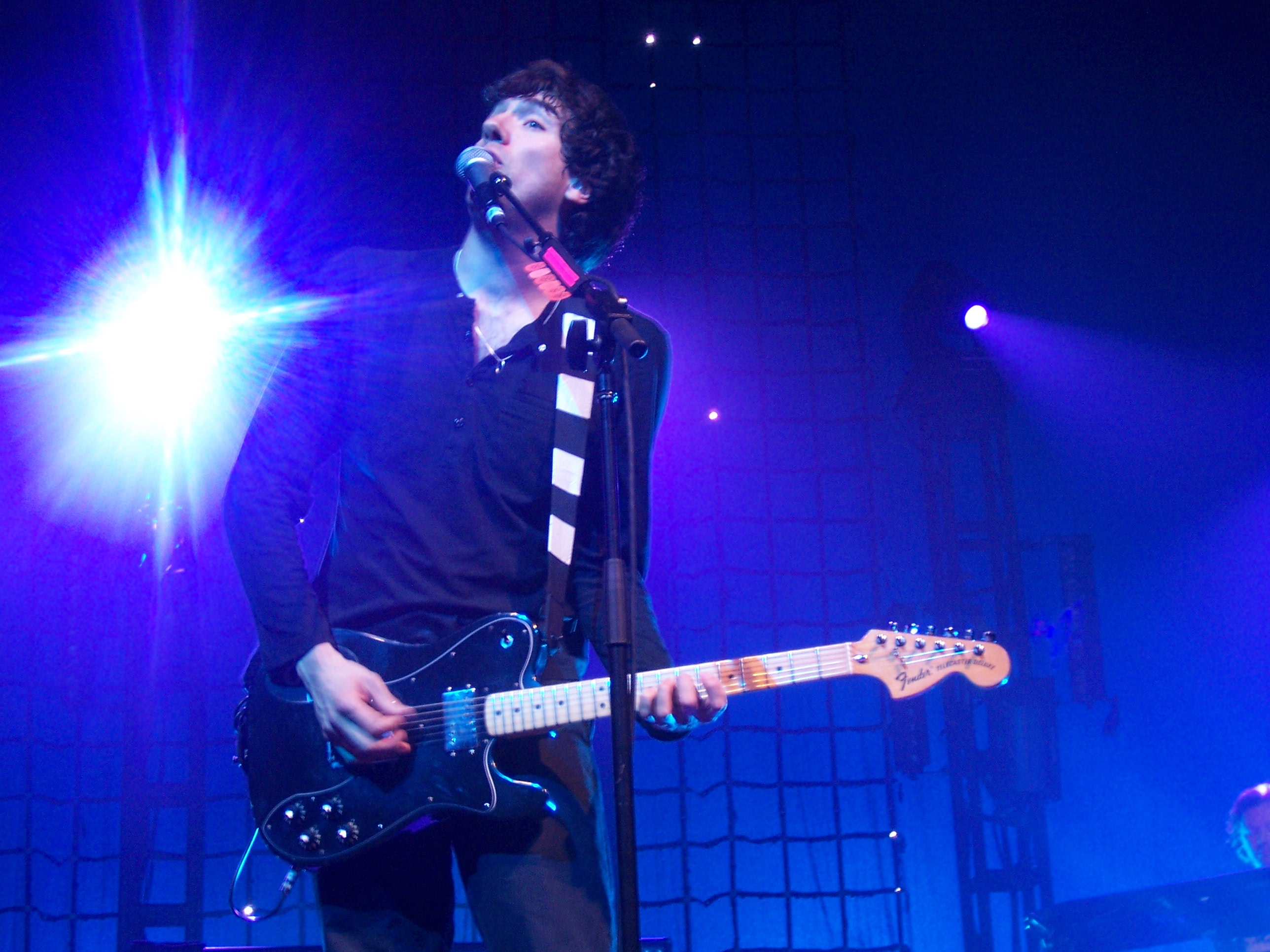
Gary Lightbody, Snow Patrol frontman and Campbell College past pupil

Past pupils are known as Old Campbellians or OCs and the school has an extensive past pupil organisation known as The Old Campbellian Society which has several branches across the United Kingdom, USA and Asia as well as regular OC reunions at the school itself. The school colours are black and white, whilst the OC colours are black, white and green.

- Dudi Appleton, director, screenwriter and journalist
- Peter Caruth, Ireland men's field hockey international and Olympian
- Derek Bell, harpist, member of The Chieftains
- Edward Armstrong Bennet, army chaplain, psychiatrist, analytical psychologist, friend of Carl Jung, author
- Paul Bew, scholar and life peer
- Nathan Braniff, actor
- Andrew Bree, swimmer
- Thomas Watters Brown, judge
- Gordon Burns, journalist and television presenter
- Sir Anthony Campbell, retired judge
- William C. Campbell, parasitologist and Nobel Laureate in Physiology/Medicine
- David Caves, actor who is perhaps best known for his role as Jack Hodgson in the BBC drama series Silent Witness
- Sir John Collins, businessman
- Freeman Wills Crofts, author; was a member of the school's first class in 1894
- George Currie, Northern Irish barrister and politician
- Edmund De Wind, Victoria Cross recipient
- Eric Robertson Dodds, classical scholar
- William John English, Victoria Cross recipient whose medal was bequeathed to the school
- Chris Farrell, rugby union footballer for Ireland
- Thomas Henry Flewett, virologist
- Mike Gibson, rugby union international player who represented Ireland and the British & Irish Lions
- Lloyd Hall-Thompson, British Member of Parliament
- Gordon Hamilton (rugby union)
- Paddy Hirsch, journalist, author, award-winning reporter, producer and presenter for NPR and Marketplace (radio program)
- Michael Hoey, golfer
- John Irvine, award-winning ITV News journalist
- Ken Kennedy (rugby union)
- Charles Lawson, actor
- C. S. Lewis, author
- Gary Lightbody, vocalist and guitarist in Snow Patrol
- Sir John MacDermott, Baron MacDermott, former Lord Chief Justice of Northern Ireland
- James Godfrey MacManaway, MP and Church of Ireland minister
- William MacQuitty, film producer
- Neil McComb, rugby union footballer for Ulster
- Colonel Sir Michael McCorkell – Northern Irish soldier
- Sir Percy McElwaine, barrister and Attorney General of Fiji
- Alan McFarland, former British Army officer and Ulster Unionist politician
- Alan McKibbin, British Member of Parliament
- F. E. McWilliam, sculptor
- A.P.W. Malcomson, historian
- Tim Martin, founder and chairman of JD Wetherspoon
- Mike McComish, Ulster and Ireland 7s rugby player
- Darren Meredith, footballer
- John Morrow, peace activist
- Freddy Murray, tennis player for the Ireland Davis Cup team
- Tom O'Toole, rugby union footballer for Ulster
- Julie Parkes now Brown, Northern Ireland's first Female Olympic Swimmer Los Angeles 1984
- Stuart Pollock, cricketer and cricket administrator
- Jonny Quinn, drummer in Snow Patrol
- John Thompson Shepherd, physician and medical researcher
- James Simmons, poet
- Jamie Smith, rugby union footballer for Ulster
- Patrick Taylor, novelist
- Noel Thompson, BBC journalist
- Air Chief Marshal John Thomson, RAF officer
- Paddy Wallace, rugby union footballer for Ireland
- Robyn Ward, Irish contemporary artist
- Charles Richard Whitfield, obstetrician and gynaecologist, pioneer of maternal-foetal medicine and a Regius Professor of Midwifery
