= Eileen Fogarty =

American actress

- Born: Singapore
- Occupation: Actress
- Years active: 2004–present
- Spouse: Paddy Hirsch (m. 1998)

Eileen Fogarty is an American actress, writer, and producer. She is known for playing Mrs. Nguyen in the television show Better Call Saul and Nguyen Nguyen in F is for Family.

== Background ==
Fogarty was born to an Irish father and Vietnamese mother and grew up in Singapore and Southern California. She can speak several languages, including German, Mandarin, and Vietnamese.

== Personal life ==
In 1998, Fogarty married Paddy Hirsch, a British journalist who was born in England and raised in Northern Ireland. The couple live in Los Angeles, California.

== Career ==
Fogarty performed her one-woman show It's Phuc Tap! (It's complicated) at the 2005 New York International Fringe Festival.

== Filmography ==
Year	Title	Role	Notes
2004	American Dreams	Pham Din's Wife	
2004	Will & Grace	Hostess	
2008	It's Always Sunny in Philadelphia	Female Bank Clerk	
2008	Grey's Anatomy	Mrs. Chen's Sister	
2009	Weeds	Vietnamese Attendant #2	
2010	Pretty Little Liars	Waitress	
2010	Desperate Housewives	Teller	
2010	Sons of Anarchy	Doctor	
2011	Criminal Minds: Suspect Behavior	Woman	
2011	Workaholics	Co-Worker #4	
2012	Criminal Minds	Dr. Lin	
2012	General Hospital	Nurse #2	
2013	Anger Management	Couple Woman #4	
2014	The Middle	Woman #1	
2014	The Fosters	Stage Manager	
2015	The Young and the Restless	Nurse	
2015	Extant	Reporter	
2015	Secret in Their Eyes	Angie - Receptionist	
2015–2022	Better Call Saul	Mrs. Nguyen	Recurring; 10 episodes
2016	Angie Tribeca	Reporter #2	
2016	Jane the Virgin	Woman in Line	
2016	Castle	Élodie	
2016	The Last Ship	Vietnamese Delegate	
2017	I'm Sorry	Joanne	
2017	Teen Wolf	Nurse	
2017	S.W.A.T.	Councilwoman Baliss	
2017	How to Get Away with Murder	Bar Representative	
2017	Modern Family	Susie	
2018–2021	F Is for Family	Nguyen Nguyen	Voice role; recurring; 12 episodes
2020	Stumptown	Laurel	
2020	Perry Mason	Madam Jin	
2021	B Positive	Dr. Maxwell	
