= Palladium, Llandudno =

Pub and former theatre in Llandudno, Wales

The Palladium
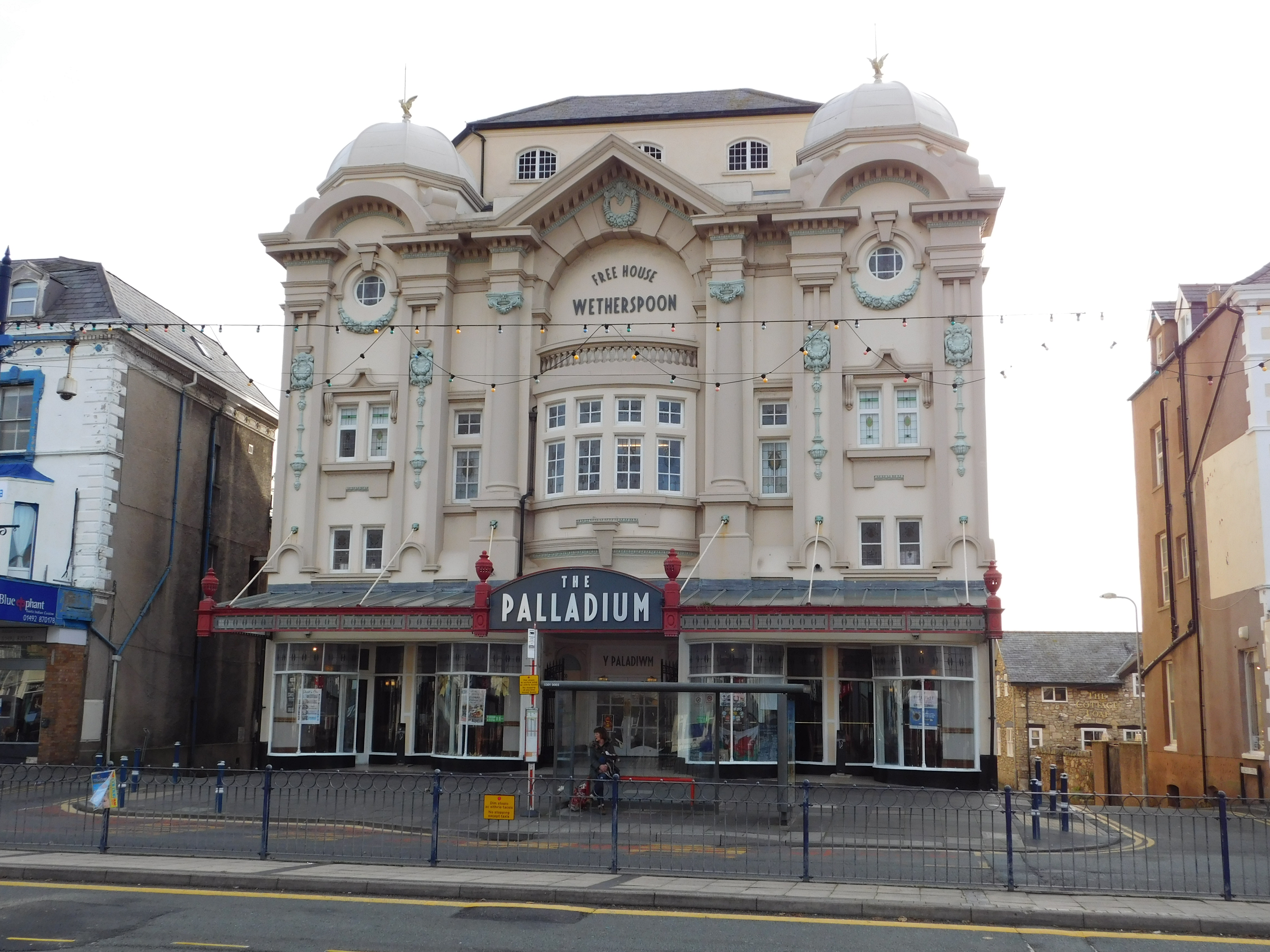
- Interactive map of The Palladium
- 53°19′30.22″N 3°49′56.14″W
- Location: Gloddaeth Street, Llandudno
- OS grid reference: SH 780 825

History
- Built: 1920
- Original use: theatre and cinema

Site notes
- Architect: Arthur Hewitt
- Current use: theme pub
- Website: www.jdwetherspoon.com/pubs/all-pubs/wales/conwy/the-palladium-llandudno

Listed Building – Grade II
- Designated: 16 March 1976
- Reference no.: 5794

The Palladium is a former theatre and cinema, since 2001 a pub, in Llandudno, Conwy County Borough, Wales. It is a Grade II listed building.

== History and description ==
The theatre, built on the site of a market hall, opened on Bank Holiday Monday 30 August 1920. It was designed in Baroque style by Arthur Hewitt, a councillor in Llandudno; he also designed Clare's Department Store and the Washington Hotel in the town.

The stuccoed facade has two domed towers to each side, and a central recess featuring an oriel window within pillars that support a pediment. On the ground floor there are shop fronts on either side of the entrance. The original theatre had a circular entrance foyer, leading to the auditorium, which seated 1,500 in stalls, a dress circle and a balcony. There were also boxes either side of the stage and behind the dress circle.

The building was a theatre and cinema during its early years. After the Second World War it was mainly a cinema, with stage productions during the summer. In 1972 there was a conversion, so that the interior was split into a bingo hall in the former stalls, and a cinema in the former dress circle. The building was closed in September 1999.

It was purchased by Wetherspoons in 2000; it was restored as much as possible into its original condition, in accordance with planning permission, and was opened as a theme pub in August 2001. There was restoration of the exterior in 2012–13.
