= Tim Martin (businessman) =

British businessman (born 1955)

Sir Tim Martin
- Born: Timothy Randall Martin; 28 April 1955 (age 71); Norwich, Norfolk, England
- Education: University of Nottingham (LLB)
- Occupation: Businessman
- Known for: Founder and chairman of J D Wetherspoon plc (1979–present)
- Spouse: Felicity Owen
- Children: 4

Sir Timothy Randall Martin (born 28 April 1955) is an English businessman and the founder and chairman of J D Wetherspoon plc, a pub chain in the UK and Ireland.

== Early life ==
Timothy Martin was born on 28 April 1955 in Norwich. His father served in the Royal Air Force and then worked for brewing multinational Guinness plc, where he became the Malaysian marketing director. He has two younger brothers, Trevor and Gerry, and a sister, Louise.

Martin was educated at eleven schools in New Zealand and Northern Ireland, including Campbell College, Belfast.

He earned a bachelor's degree in law from the University of Nottingham, and qualified as a barrister in 1979, but has never practised.

== Career ==
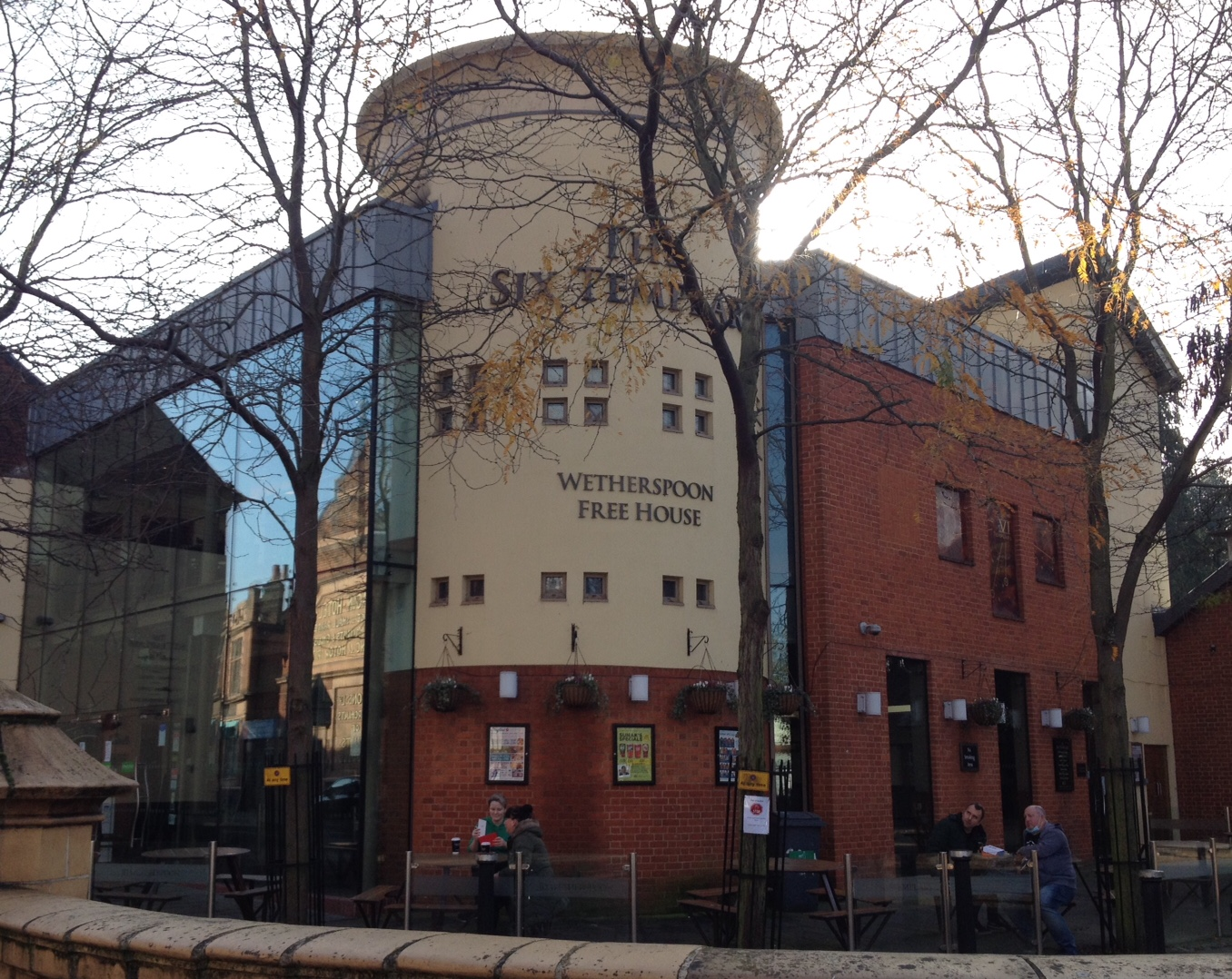
The Six Templars in Hertford, seen in November 2020

His early jobs included working on a building site in Ware, Hertfordshire, and acting as a sales representative for The Times.

Martin is the founder and chairman of J D Wetherspoon plc. He bought his first pub, in Muswell Hill, in 1979 which was originally named Martin's Free House before renaming to Wetherspoons, named after one of Martin's teachers who could not control his class. His brother Gerry also ran a pub chain, Old Monk, which was listed in 1998, but went out of business in 2002.

After the opening of Martin's first location, the organisation kept growing and expanding as Wetherspoons started opening more locations throughout the north of London, and eventually across the whole UK. In 1992, Wetherspoons was listed on the Stock Exchange as JD Wetherspoon plc.

In 1998, Martin kept expanding the company's operations and opened 20 locations in one month in July, with seven opening on the same day.

In 2000, under Martin's leadership, Wetherspoon opened its 400th location and by 2008 the number had increased to 800 Wetherspoon locations.

In 2005, Martin was voted the fifth most influential person in the UK pub industry. He is an admirer of Sam Walton's business philosophy. As of 2009, he visited at least 15 Wetherspoon outlets each week.

In January 2023, the Wetherspoon pub chain closed 11 pubs across the UK with 35 more up for sale, Martin stated that pubs across the UK were being crippled via unfair taxes in comparison to supermarkets. Martin went on to state that he was pushing for tax parity with supermarkets and unless this is implemented the pub industry would inevitably shrink.

As of February 2023, Martin owned 30.77m shares (23.90% of shares).

In February 2026, Tim Martin was listed on the Sunday Times Tax List with an estimated £199.7 million.

== Political views ==
=== Brexit ===
In 2016, Martin actively campaigned for the United Kingdom to leave the European Union and was a strong supporter of Brexit, donating £200,000 to the Vote Leave campaign in 2016. He also campaigned on BBC Radio 4 programmes including Today, Question Time and Farming Today. Throughout the campaign, he gave his reasons for the United Kingdom's withdrawal from the European Union.

In January 2017, Wetherspoon published figures showing an increase in sales of more than 3%. Martin used this as evidence that there was no post-Brexit referendum slowdown as predicted by economists.

In June 2018, Martin announced that Wetherspoon would be ceasing the sale of products from other European Union countries in a 24-month plan, with the immediate example of Prosecco and Champagne being replaced by Australian wines. He believes the prediction of food prices rising and food shortages leading to stockpiling of supplies in the UK post-Brexit is merely scaremongering tactics deployed by pro-EU journalists, and mentioned the fact there were no increased queues in his restaurants as a result; after he removed French brandy from sale in his restaurants as an example.

Wetherspoon mass posted a pro-Brexit magazine to an unknown number of households in January 2019. The magazine claims to have a readership of two million. The employee campaign group, Spoons Workers Against Brexit, described the publication as dangerous propaganda, and said that Martin was exploiting his position as CEO. Wetherspoons responded by defending the mass mailing, stating it contained "... pro and anti Brexit articles to stimulate debate"; the proportionately minor mentions of views critical to a no deal Brexit were preceded by statements by Martin, deriding expert opinions and "the elite".

In June 2021, Martin called on the UK government to introduce a "reasonably liberal immigration system" controlled by Britain rather than the European Union. He suggested the government should adopt a visa scheme for workers from the EU to help the UK's pubs and restaurants hire more staff.

=== COVID-19 pandemic ===
Martin criticised the shutdown of businesses during the COVID-19 pandemic, saying that it was "over the top" and that pubs should continue to operate but with social distancing measures in place. After criticism regarding the shutdown of all pubs due to the spread of COVID-19, Martin addressed his 40,000 employees by video message. He acknowledged the government would pay 80 per cent of the wages of staff at companies who have lost work during the crisis, but he said the money could take weeks to come through. Martin suggested that if some staff were offered jobs in supermarkets they should consider taking them and promised that he would give first preference to those who wanted to come back to Wetherspoons. A number of newspapers inaccurately reported Martin's suggestion, but later issued corrections. The majority of staff were placed on the Government furlough scheme after its announcement.

On 19 January 2022, in a statement to the London Stock Exchange (LSE), Martin accused the Prime Minister Boris Johnson of "hypocrisy" over the "Partygate" scandal, arguing that much of the controversy would have been avoided if Downing Street staff had been able to visit pubs which, at the time of the alleged lockdown parties, were closed due to coronavirus restrictions.

=== Cost of living crisis ===
Commenting in June 2023 on the effects of the cost-of-living crisis in the UK, Martin remarked that increasing costs in the British brewing industry may result in raised prices to consumers, and suggested that the price of a pint of beer could reach £8 or more. He also expressed concerns that breweries may consider watering down beer to gain tax breaks.

In November 2024, Martin said that pub drinkers should expect prices to rise as a result of Labour's budget. This is due to growing business pressures from the increased national minimum wage and employers' national insurance contributions. In February 2026, Martin backed Reform UK's plan to slash VAT for pubs, saying the policy would "utterly transform the competitiveness of pubs."

== Personal life ==
Martin is married to Felicity (née Owen), whom he met while at university; they have four children and live in Exeter, Devon.

In the 2024 New Year Honours, Martin was appointed Knight Bachelor for services to hospitality and culture.
