= Paddy Hirsch =

British-born author, journalist and economic commentator

Paddy Hirsch is a fiction and non-fiction author, award-winning journalist and economic commentator. He is the author of several novels: the contemporary revenge thriller PRIMED, which he self-published in 2026; and of the Justice Flanagan series of historical thrillers, including The Devil's Half Mile and Hudson's Kill, published by Macmillan Tor/Forge. His non-fiction work includes the book Man vs Markets, Economics Explained, Plain and Simple, a lighthearted, illustrated guide to the financial markets, published by HarperCollins.

As a freelance journalist, Hirsch works as a reporter for the NPR podcast The Indicator, from Planet Money, and as an editor for Bloomberg’s Big Take podcast.

Previously he was a Senior Editor at NPR, in charge of The Indicator; and a Senior Producer at the American Public Media production house Marketplace, where he produced the weekend personal finance program Marketplace Money and produced and hosted the Marketplace Whiteboard, a weekly video explainer covering the financial markets and the economy. Marketplace Whiteboard was a Webby Award Honoree in 2009. Hirsch was editor of the Marketplace New York Bureau throughout the 2008 financial crisis. In 2010, he was awarded a fellowship with the John S. Knight Fellowships for Professional Journalists at Stanford University. He was a Webby Award nominee in 2009 and was a 2014 winner of the Edward R Murrow award for excellence in reporting.

== Biography ==
Hirsch was born in Weymouth, England, and grew up in Northern Ireland and Dublin, Ireland. He joined Marketplace in March 2007. Previously, he worked as a senior editor for Leveraged Commentary & Data, a division of Standard and Poor's, and for Bank Letter, a newsletter in the Euromoney Institutional Investor portfolio. He worked as the editor of the Vietnam Economic Times in 1998, and as a field producer at CNBC Asia in Hong Kong between 1995 and 1997. Before becoming a journalist, he served as an officer in the Royal Marines from 1986 to 1995. He graduated top of his class from the Commando Training Centre Royal Marines, and was awarded the Sword of Honour. Hirsch attended the University of Warwick in the United Kingdom, and Campbell College in Belfast, Northern Ireland.
