= Wetherspoons =

British pub chain

J D Wetherspoon plc

- Wetherspoon pub The Metropolitan at Chiltern Court, London
- Formerly: J.D. Wetherspoon Organisation Limited (1983–1992)
- Type: Public limited company
- Traded as: LSE: JDW; FTSE 250 component
- Industry: Hospitality
- Founded: 1979
- Founder: Sir Tim Martin
- Headquarters: Watford, Hertfordshire, England
- Area served: United Kingdom, Ireland and Spain
- Key people: Sir Tim Martin (Chairman); John Hutson (CEO)
- Products: Public houses and hotels
- Revenue: ▲£2,238.0 million (2026)
- Operating income: ▼£120.2 million (2026)
- Net income: ▼£60.5 million (2026)
- Number of employees: 42,409 (2026)
- Website: jdwetherspoon.com

J D Wetherspoon plc (branded variously as Wetherspoon or Wetherspoons, and colloquially known as Spoons) is a British pub company that operates 827 pubs across the United Kingdom, the Isle of Man, the Republic of Ireland and, from January 2026, Spain.

The company was founded in 1979 by Sir Tim Martin and is based in Watford, Hertfordshire, England. It operates the sub-brand of Lloyds No. 1 bars, and 56 Wetherspoon hotels. Wetherspoon is known for converting unconventional premises, such as former cinemas and banks, into pubs – part of its wider engagement with local history. The company is publicly listed on the London Stock Exchange (LSE) and is a constituent of the FTSE 250 Index.

== History ==
=== Foundation and early years ===
Tim Martin opened his first pub in 1979 in Colney Hatch Lane in Muswell Hill, London. Many of the other early Wetherspoon pubs were also in the western part of Haringey. The name of the business originates from JD Hogg, a character in The Dukes of Hazzard, and Wetherspoon, the surname of one of Martin's teachers in New Zealand, who was known for not being able to control his classroom, similar to Martin's first pub, thus the name.

During the 1990s, Wetherspoons began a policy of routinely closing its smaller or less profitable outlets, often replacing them with larger premises close by. In 1998, Wetherspoons introduced the oversized pint glass to promote the "full pint". This initiative was withdrawn, supposedly because customers were still asking for top-ups, but arguably because other pub chains did not follow its lead.

Wetherspoons pioneered non-smoking areas in pubs before the Smoking, Health and Social Care (Scotland) Act 2005, The Smoking (Northern Ireland) Order 2006 and the Health Act 2006 in England and Wales became law in 2006.

In 2015, Wetherspoons was ordered to pay a total of £24,000 in damages for "direct racial discrimination" to eight individuals who were refused admittance to one of its pubs in north London (The Coronet on Holloway Road, Islington) based on what a judge described as "the stereotypical assumption that Irish travellers and English gypsies cause disorder wherever they go".

On 16 April 2018, Wetherspoons deleted all of its social media profiles. Chairman Tim Martin cited the "current bad publicity surrounding social media, including the trolling of MPs and others" as a reason for the decision.

The chain, whose founder is a strong supporter of Brexit, replaced champagne with British and Australian sparkling wines on 9 July 2018. The firm stated that the goal was to reduce prices for its two million weekly customers.

=== Development since 2020 ===
In mid-March 2020, during the COVID-19 pandemic in the United Kingdom, the government advised the public to avoid areas like pubs, clubs, restaurants, and gyms. As a result, many pub chains closed. However, Wetherspoon chairman Tim Martin rejected the government's advice and initially did not close any pubs, saying that his instinct was that "closure won't save lives but will cost thousands of jobs". The government ordered the closure of all pubs from 21 March.

Martin suggested that if some staff were offered jobs in supermarkets they should consider taking them and promised that he would give first preference to those who wanted to come back to Wetherspoons. A number of newspapers inaccurately reported Martin's suggestion, adding that Wetherspoons would withhold staff pay also, but later issued corrections.

Wetherspoons told its suppliers in March it would not pay them until its 874 pubs were allowed to reopen after the coronavirus lockdown. In October 2020, Wetherspoons reported its first loss in 36 years. For the year ending in July 2020, the company published a pre-tax loss of £34.1 million; the previous year, it reported a pre-tax profit of £102.5 million.

In March 2021, Wetherspoons reaffirmed its expansion plans including 75 projects, comprising 18 new pubs and 57 significant extensions to existing venues. Martin said that the ten-year project would create 2,000 jobs for staff, but that it would be "conditional on the UK opening back up again on a long-term basis, with no further lockdowns or the constant changing of rules".

The company opened its first pub in the Isle of Man in Douglas in May 2025. Manx hospitality groups expressed doubt about the viability of further expansion.

The company's first pub outside of the British Isles opened at Alicante Airport in Spain in January 2026.

In August 2026, Wetherspoons announced that it was banning its customers from playing music out loud or taking calls on speaker.

== Food and drink ==
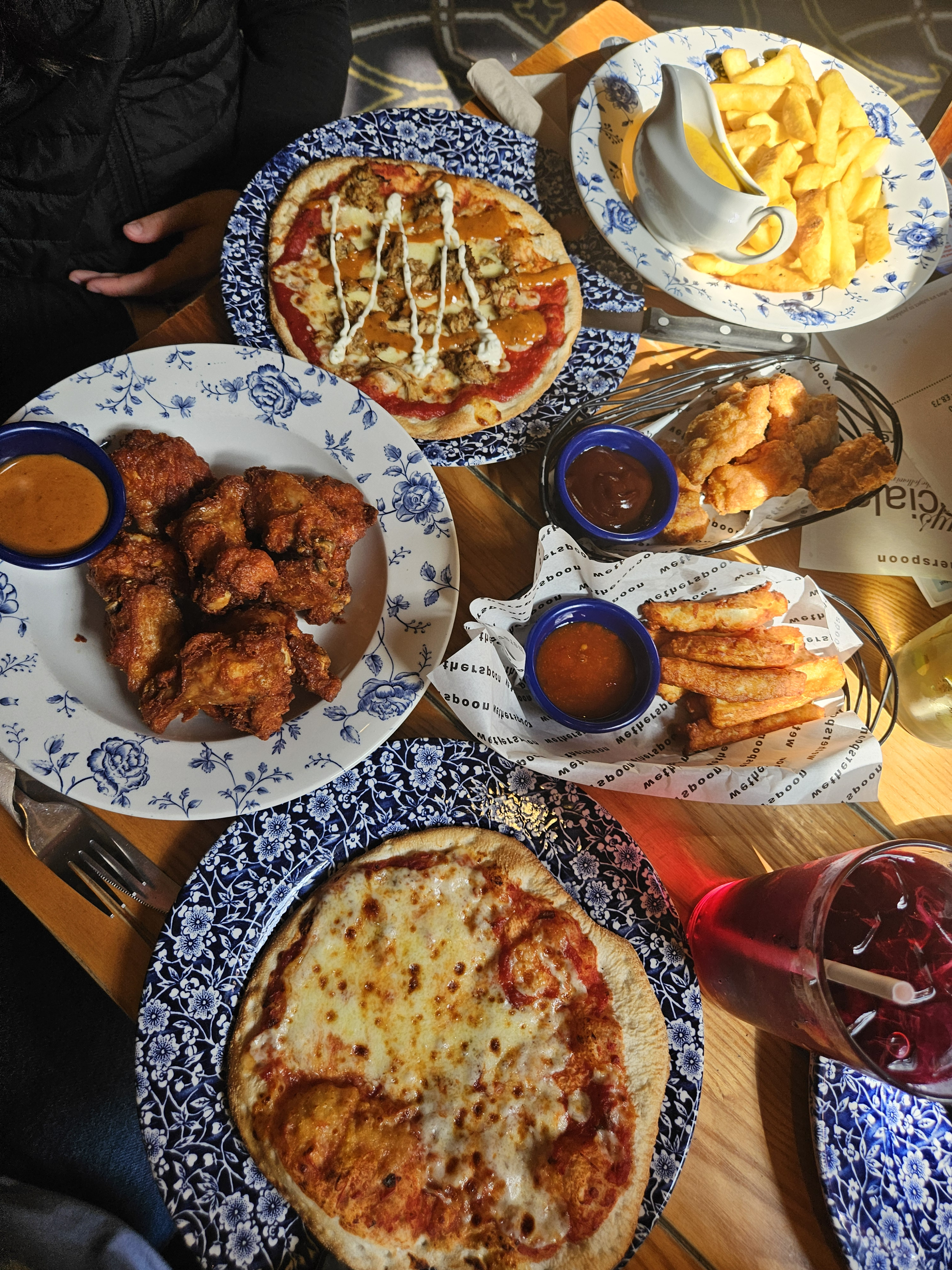
Food served as part of the "3 small plates" deal

Wetherspoon's food and drink is famously known for being offered for a low price. A large standardised menu is available all day in every pub, cultivating a perception of "unpretentious good value". Wetherspoons claims to be "the only large pub firm which opens all its pubs early in the morning", serving breakfast and coffee. The food menu has regularly incorporated additional healthier and allergen-friendly options, and displays a calorie rating next to every item.

Wetherspoons hosts ale Festivals every March/April and October, during which a larger than usual range of guest ales is available. The chain also hosts a cider festival during the summer. The company claims to be the biggest investor in craft beer in the country.

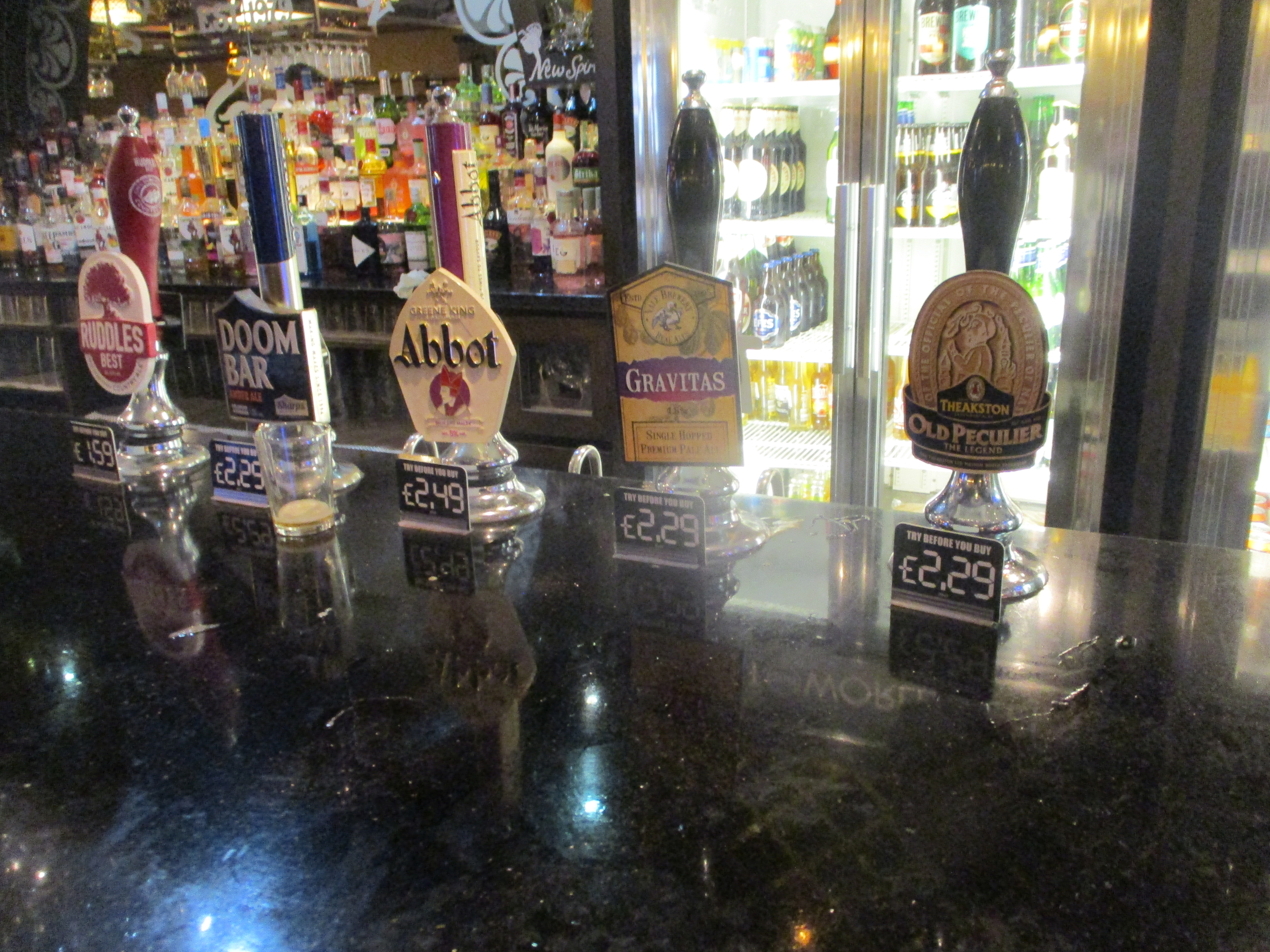
Cask ale pumps at the Broken Bridge in Pontefract

Wetherspoons holds different 'clubs' each week, offering discounts against normal prices, such as 'Curry Club' on Thursdays.

Wetherspoons objected to the value-added tax (VAT) rates on food sales in pubs and restaurants in the United Kingdom, and the fact they are higher than those paid by supermarkets. VAT rates on alcoholic drinks were the same in both pubs and supermarkets. When VAT was temporarily reduced from 20% to 5% during the COVID-19 pandemic in 2020, Wetherspoons was one of several chains to pass some of that saving to customers.

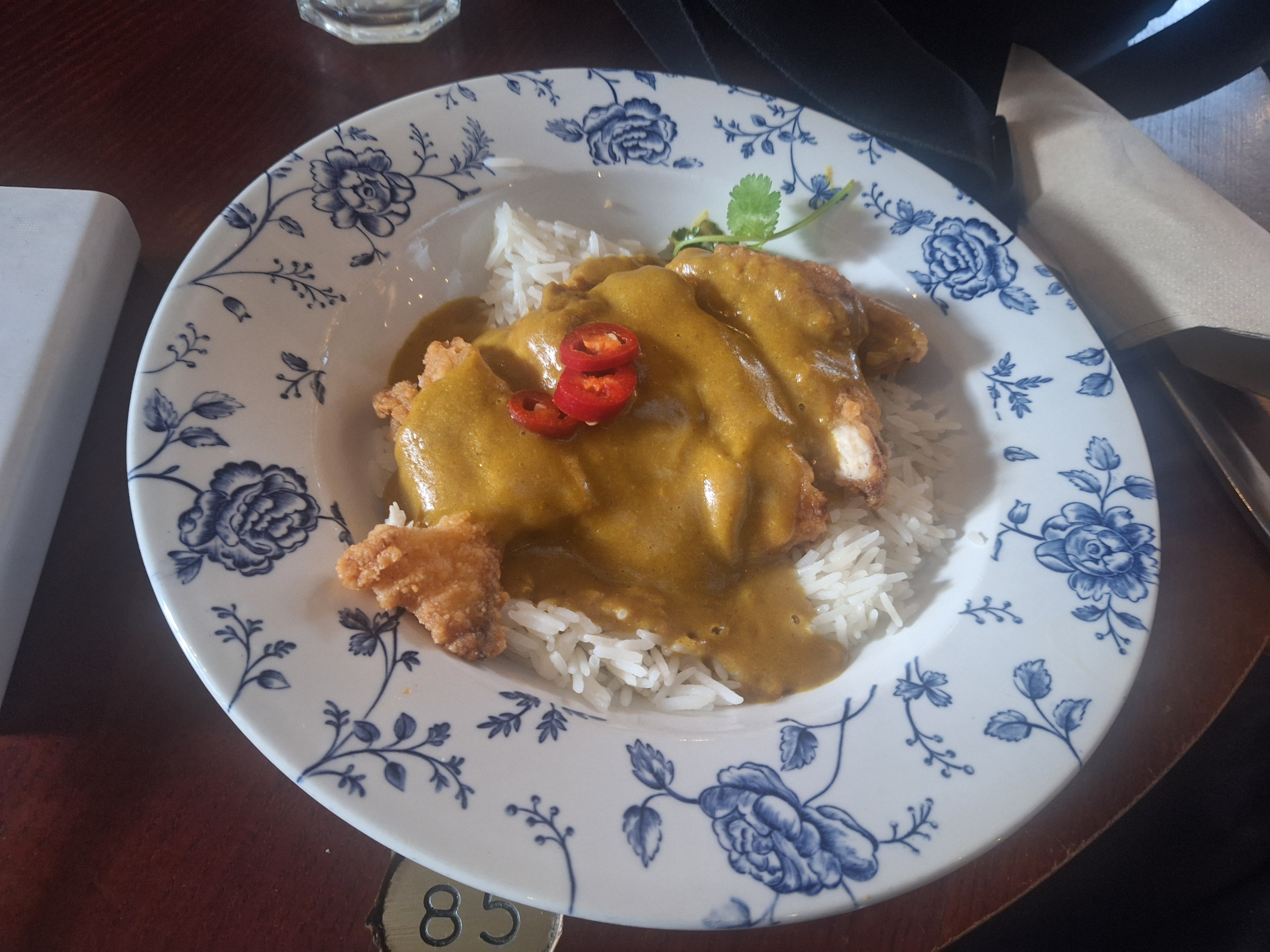
Chicken katsu curry served in The Regal Moon in Rochdale, as part of 'Curry Club' every Thursday

== Properties and operations ==
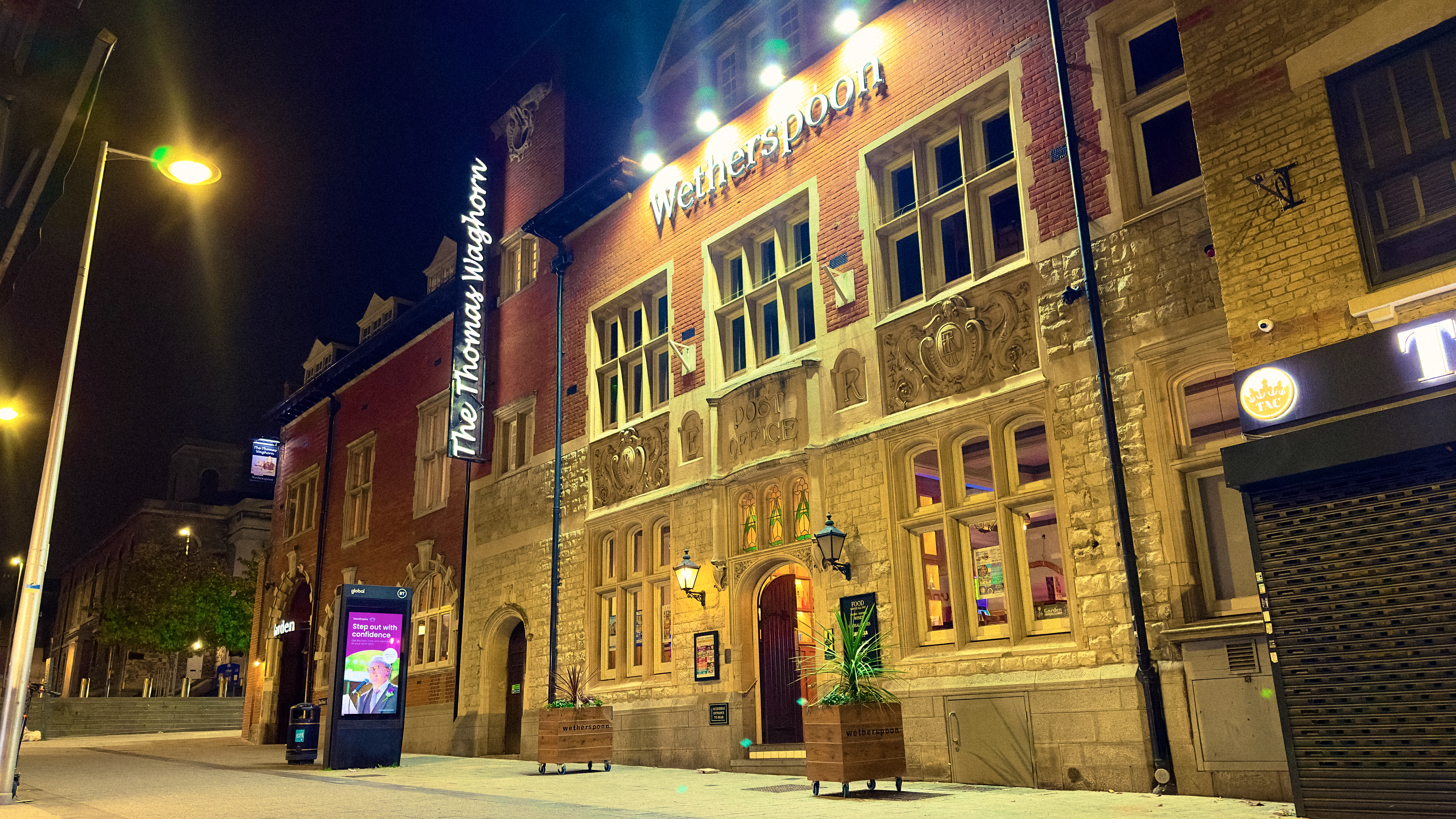
Exterior of the Thomas Waghorn at Railway Street in Chatham, Kent, England. The building, formerly as a post office, converted to a pub, is named after Thomas Fletcher Waghorn

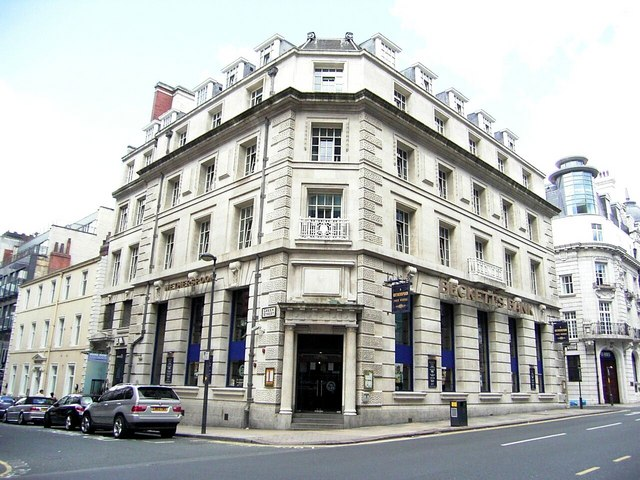
Beckett's Bank in Park Row, Leeds, its name reflecting the building's former use

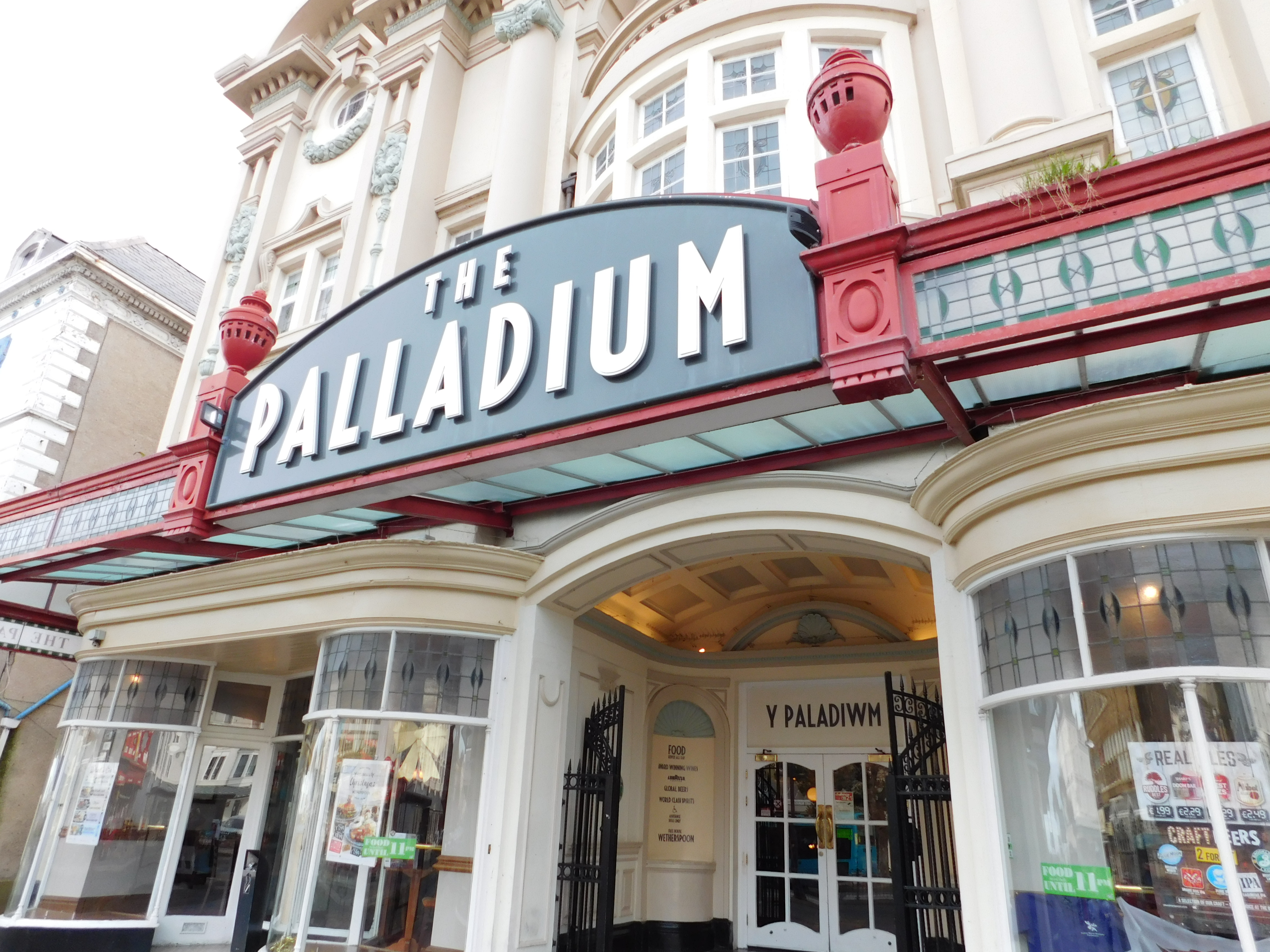
Entrance to The Palladium, Llandudno, a theatre converted to pub in 2001

Though some are new-build or late twentieth century properties, many Wetherspoon pubs are conversions of existing historic buildings which have become redundant, including banks, churches, post offices, theatres and a former public swimming pool, with many properties being listed buildings. Pubs are furnished thematically according to the heritage of the building or location, and have routinely won design awards. This has been seen as part of Wetherspoon's wider engagement with local history, which includes the prominent display of posters on local history, a dedicated pub history page, and unique carpets.

Wetherspoons has opened outlets in the passenger terminals of some UK airports, including Doncaster Sheffield Airport, Edinburgh Airport, Gatwick Airport, Heathrow Airport, and Stansted Airport, as well as at several major railway stations, including London Waterloo, Leeds, Liverpool Lime Street, London Cannon Street, London Liverpool Street, and London Victoria. The main station buildings at Aberystwyth railway station were converted to a Wetherspoons pub, Yr Hen Orsaf The Old Station, and received a National Railway Heritage Award in 2003.

The first Wetherspoons pub in all of Ireland was The Spinning Mill in Ballymena, County Antrim, Northern Ireland, which opened in August 2000. The first Wetherspoons pub in the Republic of Ireland, The Three Tun Tavern, opened in Blackrock, County Dublin, in 2014. Another opened in Cork in 2015. The Three Tun Tavern closed in January 2022 after it was bought by a consortium of former and current Irish rugby players, including Rob Kearney and Jamie Heaslip.

In 2014, Wetherspoons opened a pub at the Beaconsfield motorway service area on the M40. The move was criticised by road safety charities for potentially encouraging drink-driving.

Its largest pub is the Royal Victorian Pavilion in Ramsgate, in a building which was originally a concert hall, and later a nightclub.

Wetherspoons also operates a chain of hotels. In 2015, there were 34 hotels in England, Wales and Scotland, and also a pub and hotel in Camden Street, Dublin, Ireland.

Every Wetherspoons in Great Britain was visited by Mags Thomson from 1994 to October 2015. She visited 972, which included 80 that had subsequently closed.

In 2018, the company announced plans to open a National JD Wetherspoon Museum in Wolverhampton in the West Midlands. The existing pub, The Moon Under Water on Lichfield Street, would be expanded to take in the whole former Co-Op Department Store, to include a hotel and gift shop. Plans were approved in April 2020.

In 2022, the company announced it was selling 32 of its sites, including that at the Beaconsfield motorway service area.

=== Carpets ===
Each Wetherspoons pub has one or more unique carpets, inspired by the pub's name, location and building. They are made by Axminster Carpets and, sometimes having more than the usual six colours, have to be partially handmade on old fashioned looms, costing up to £30,000 – twice as much as stock designs. These have been the subject of a book, Spoons Carpets, by Kit Caliss and a colouring book, Colour Your Own Spoons Carpet.

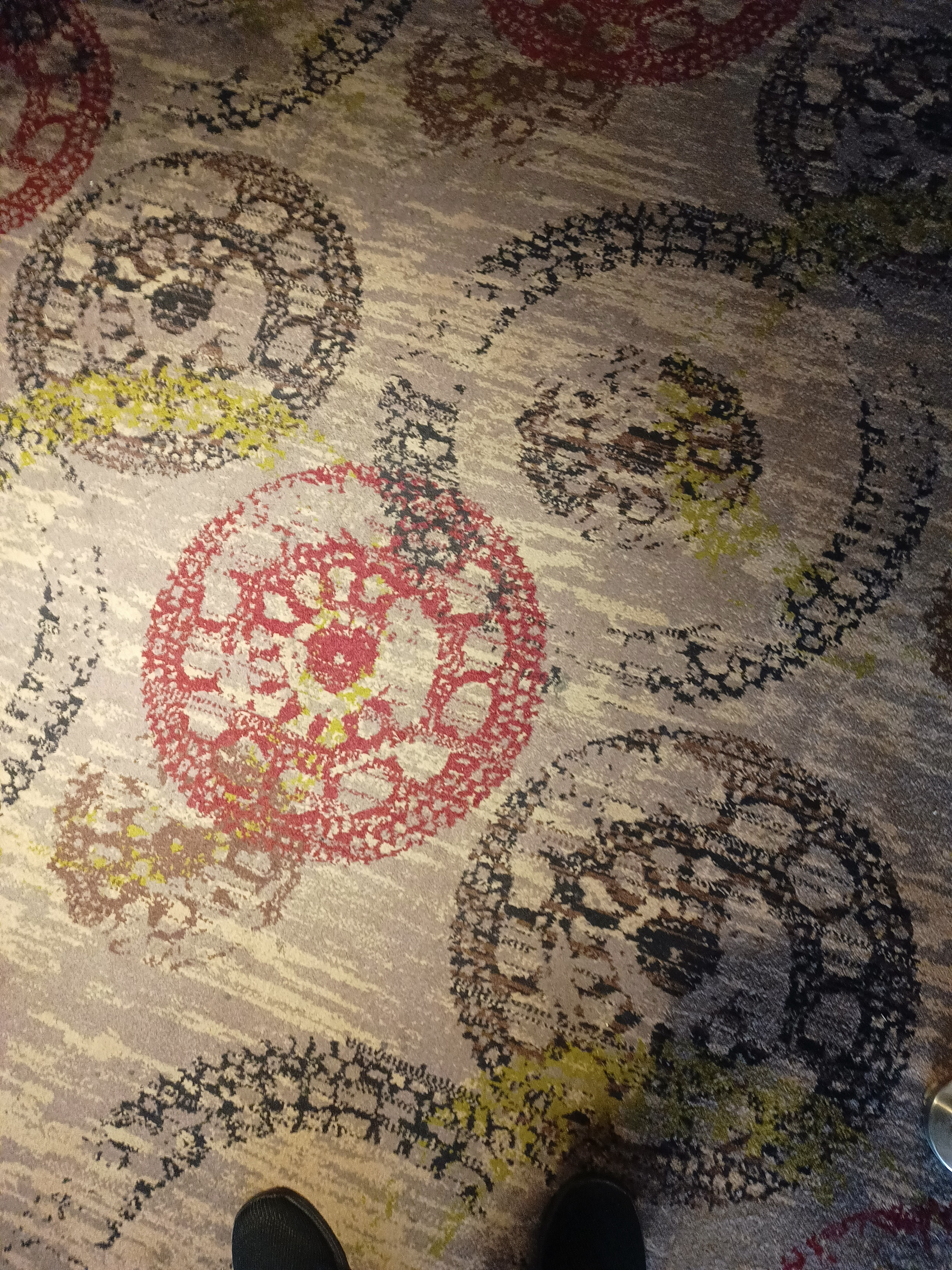
Raymond Mays, Bourne

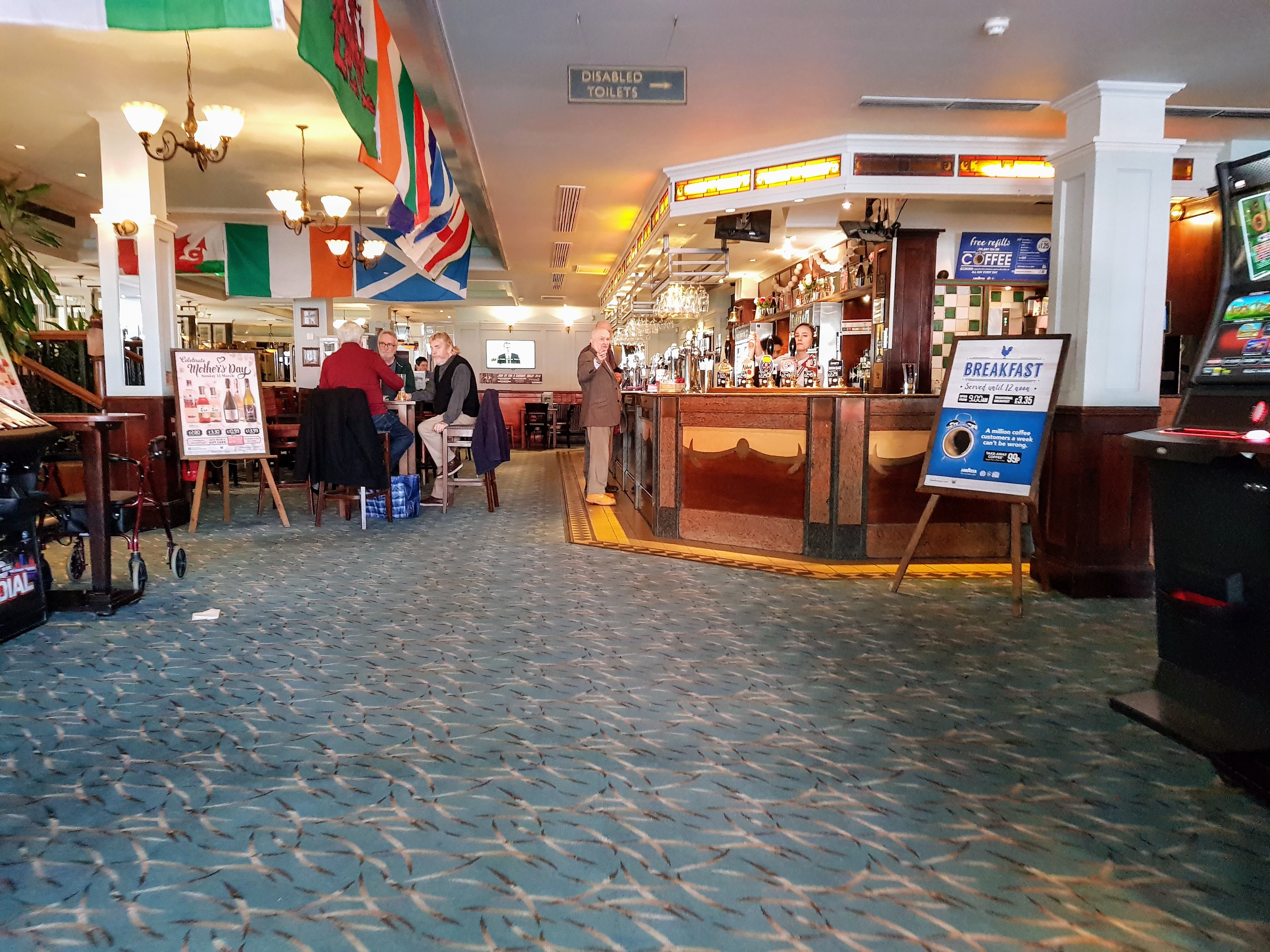
Moon and Spoon, Slough

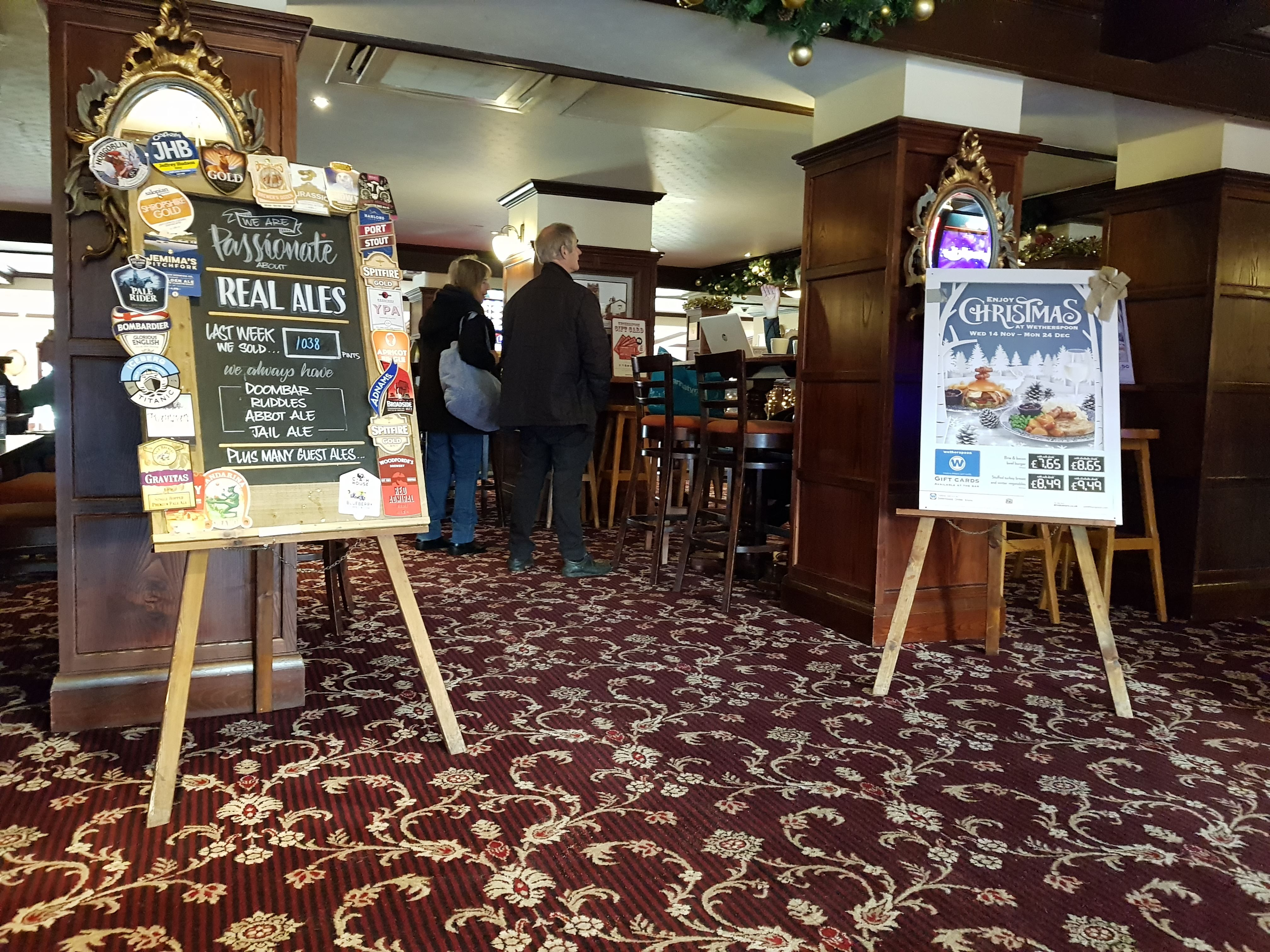
Talk of the Town, Paignton

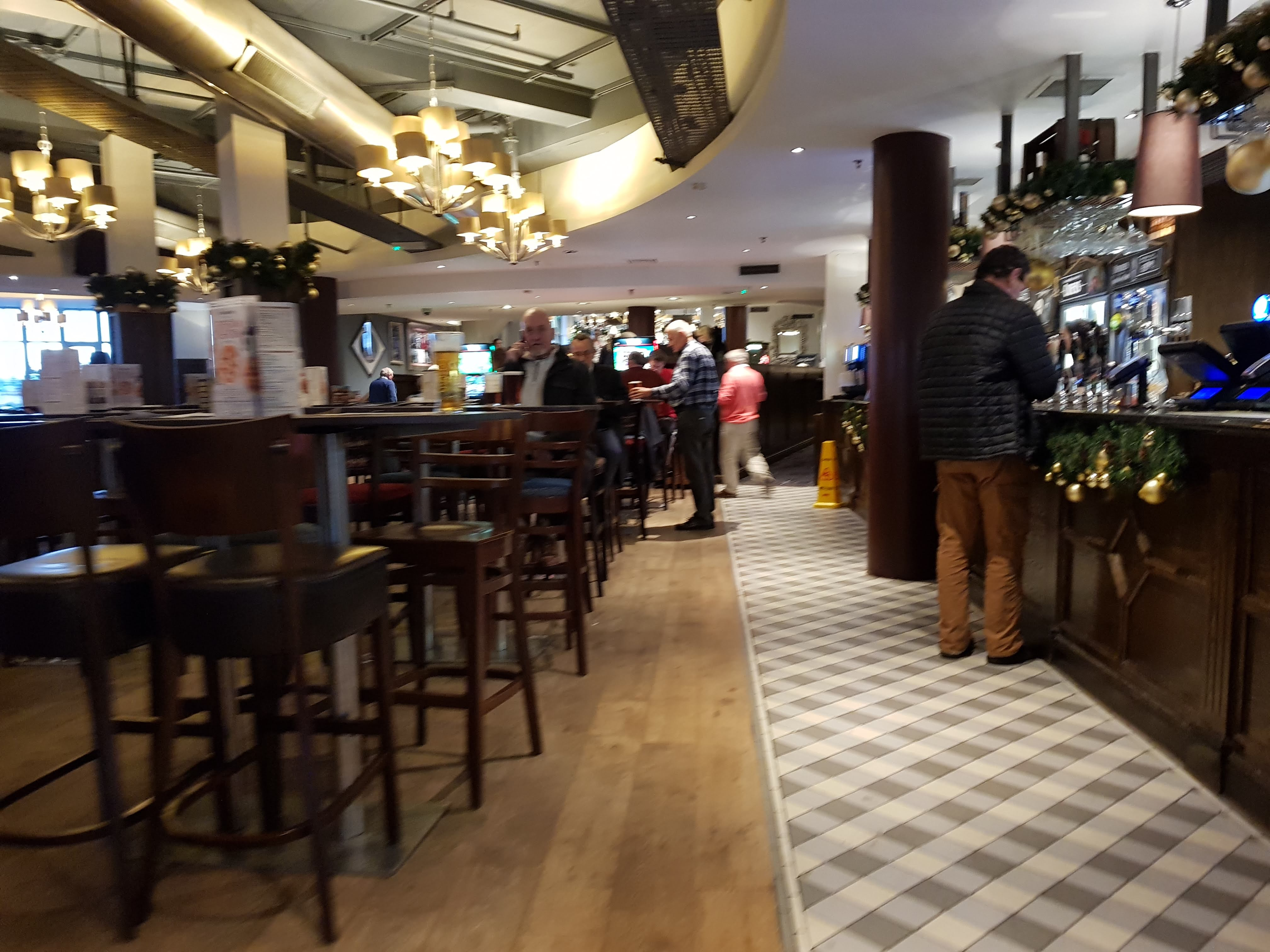
The Green Ginger, Torquay

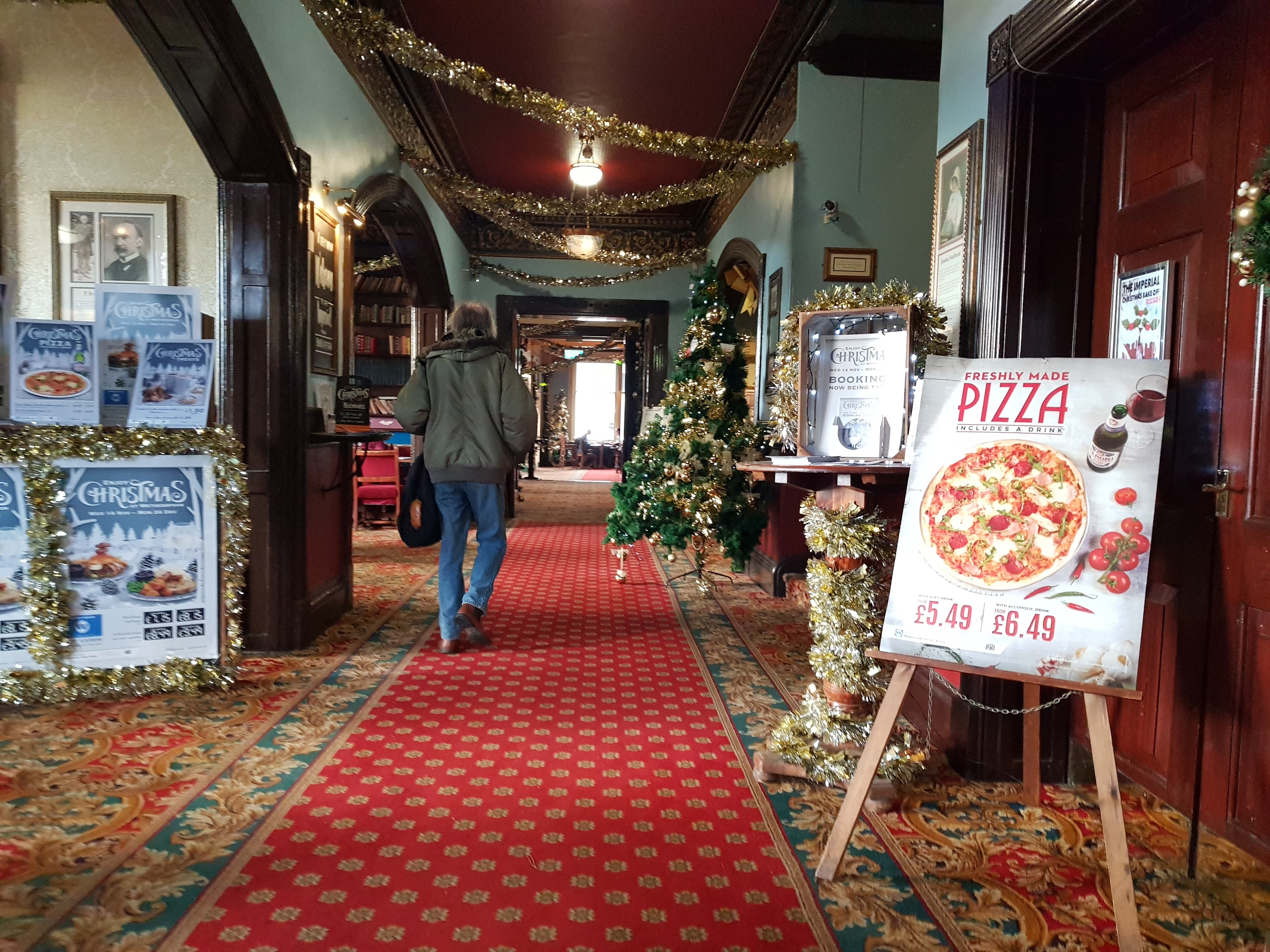
The Imperial, Exeter

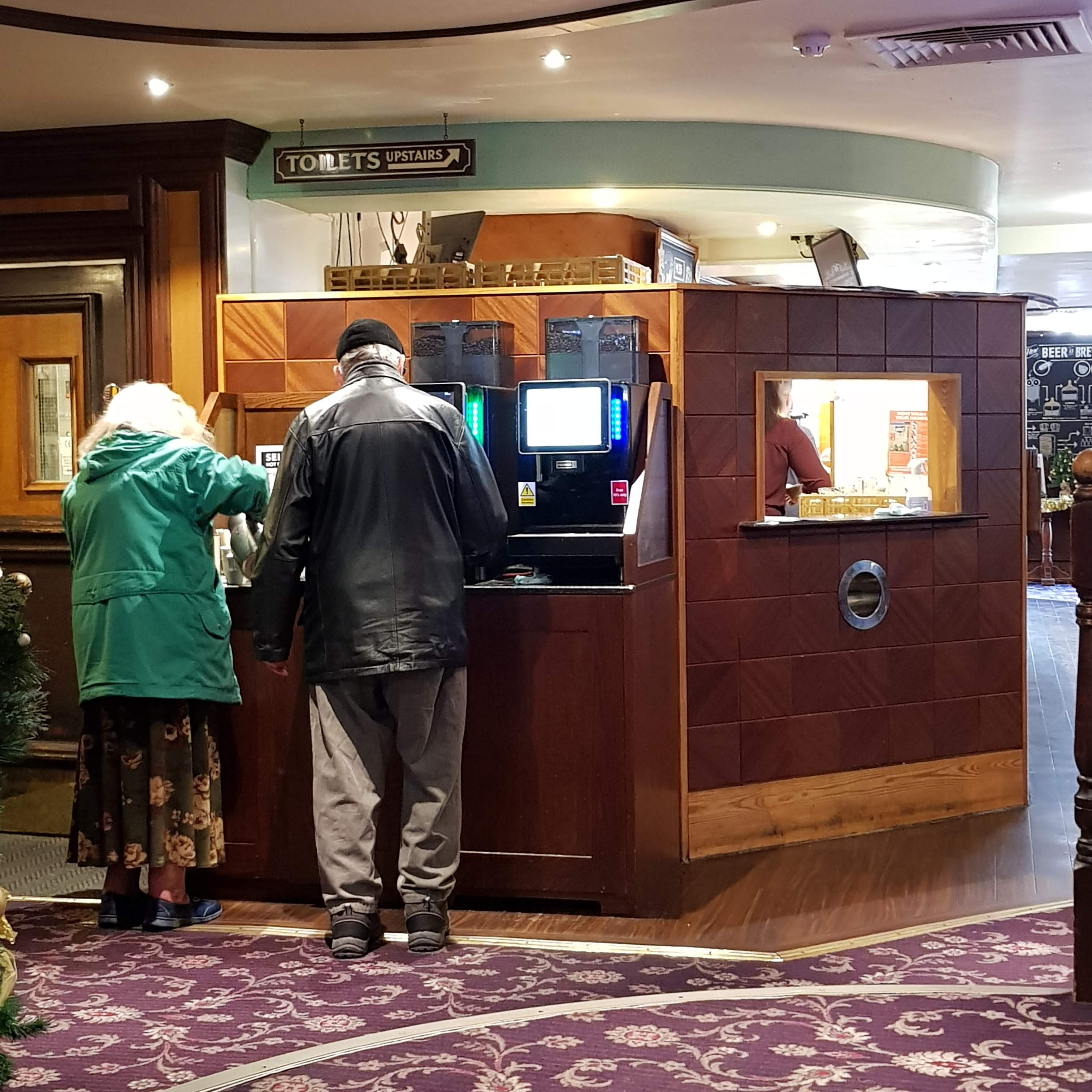
The Isaac Merritt, Paignton

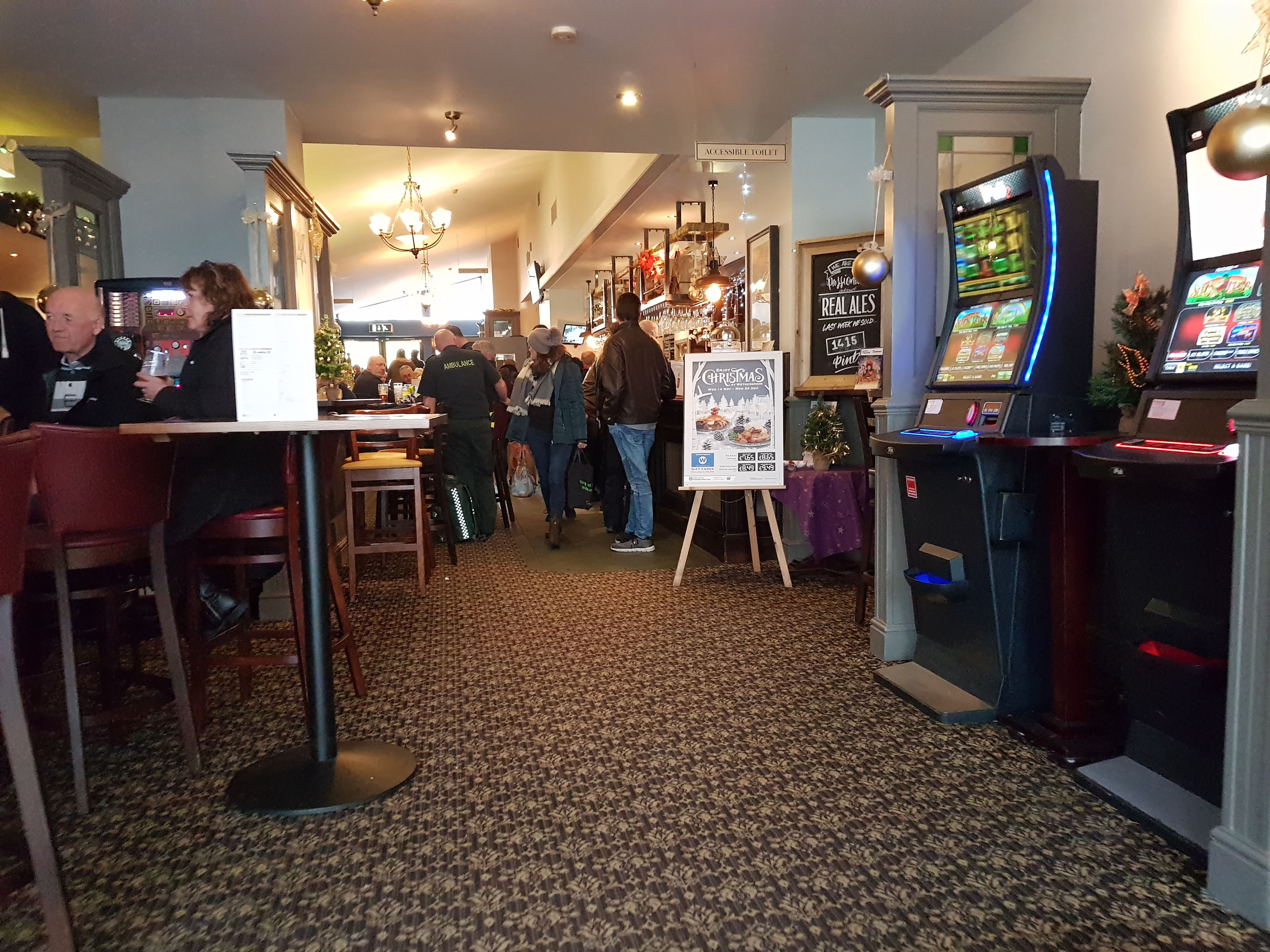
The Panniers, Barnstaple

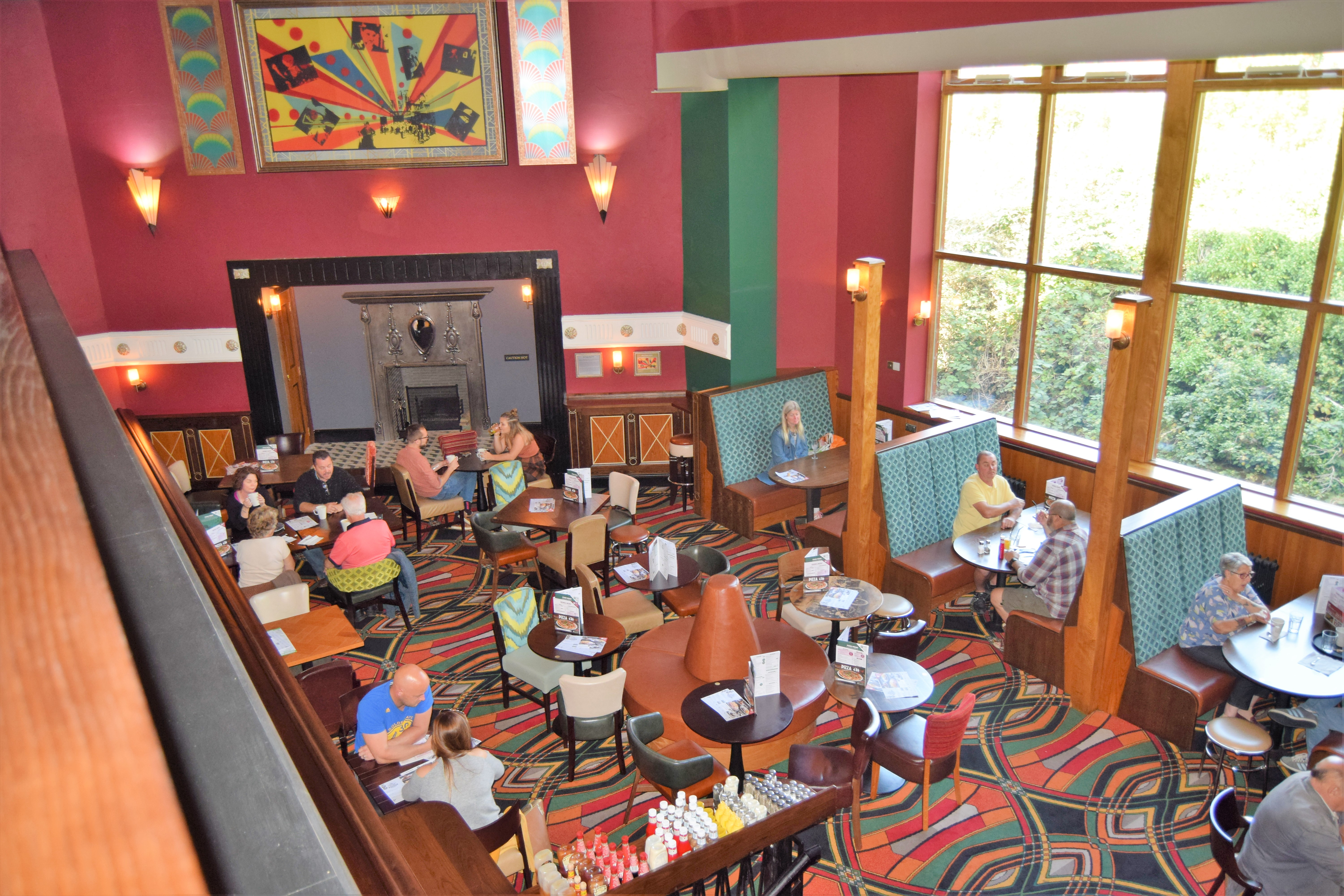
The Picture Playhouse, Bexhill

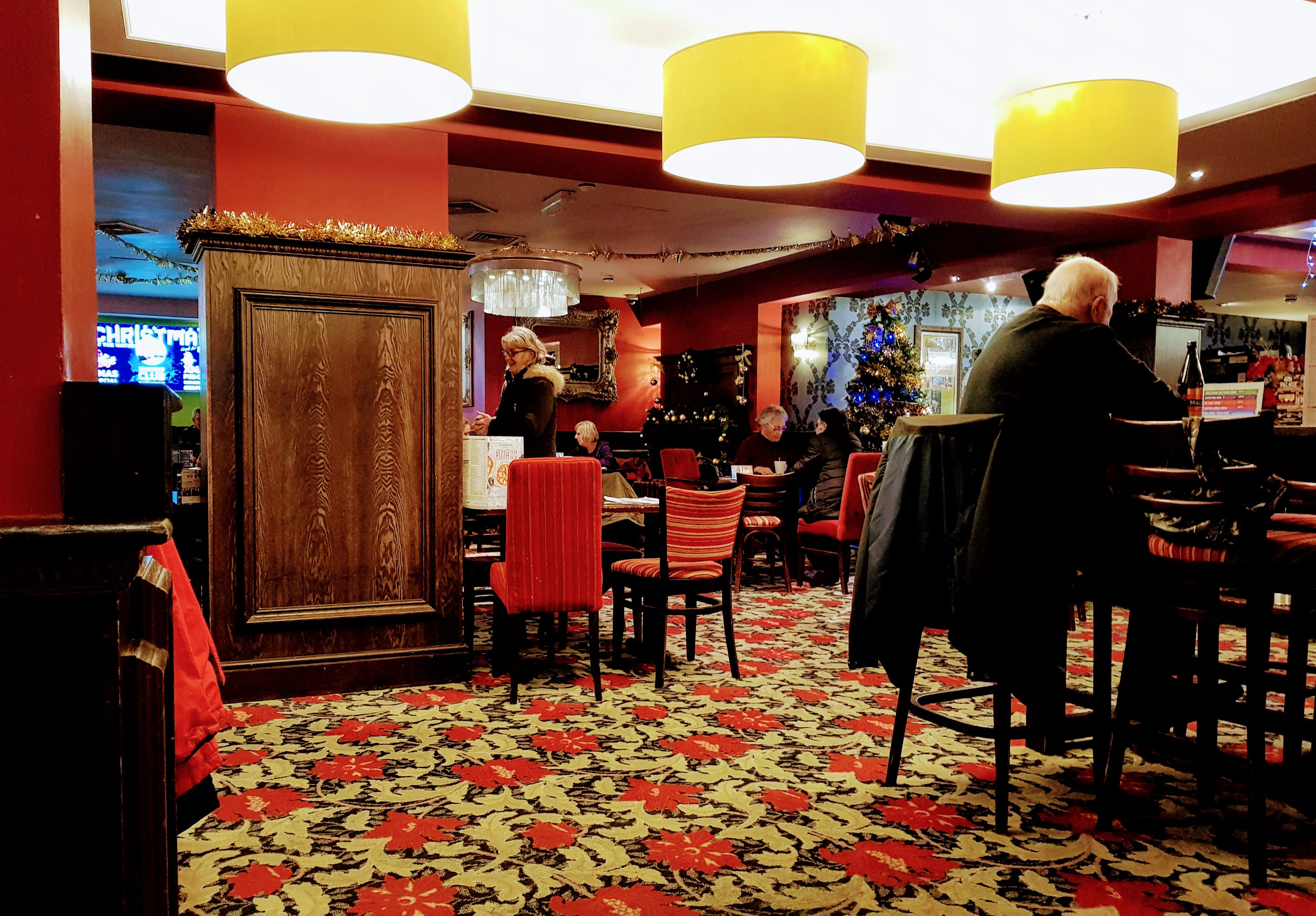
The Water Gate, Barnstaple

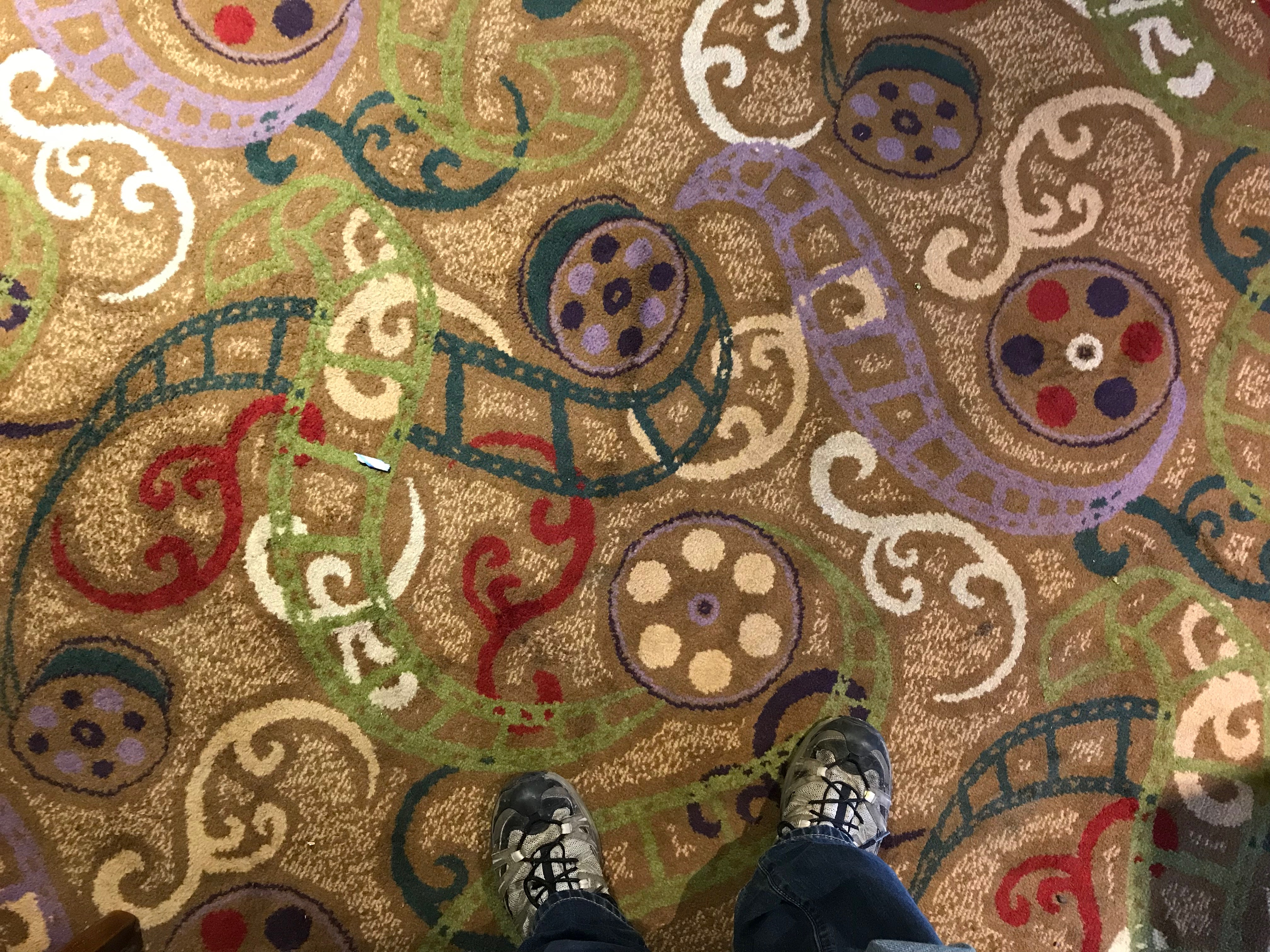
The Regal, Cambridge

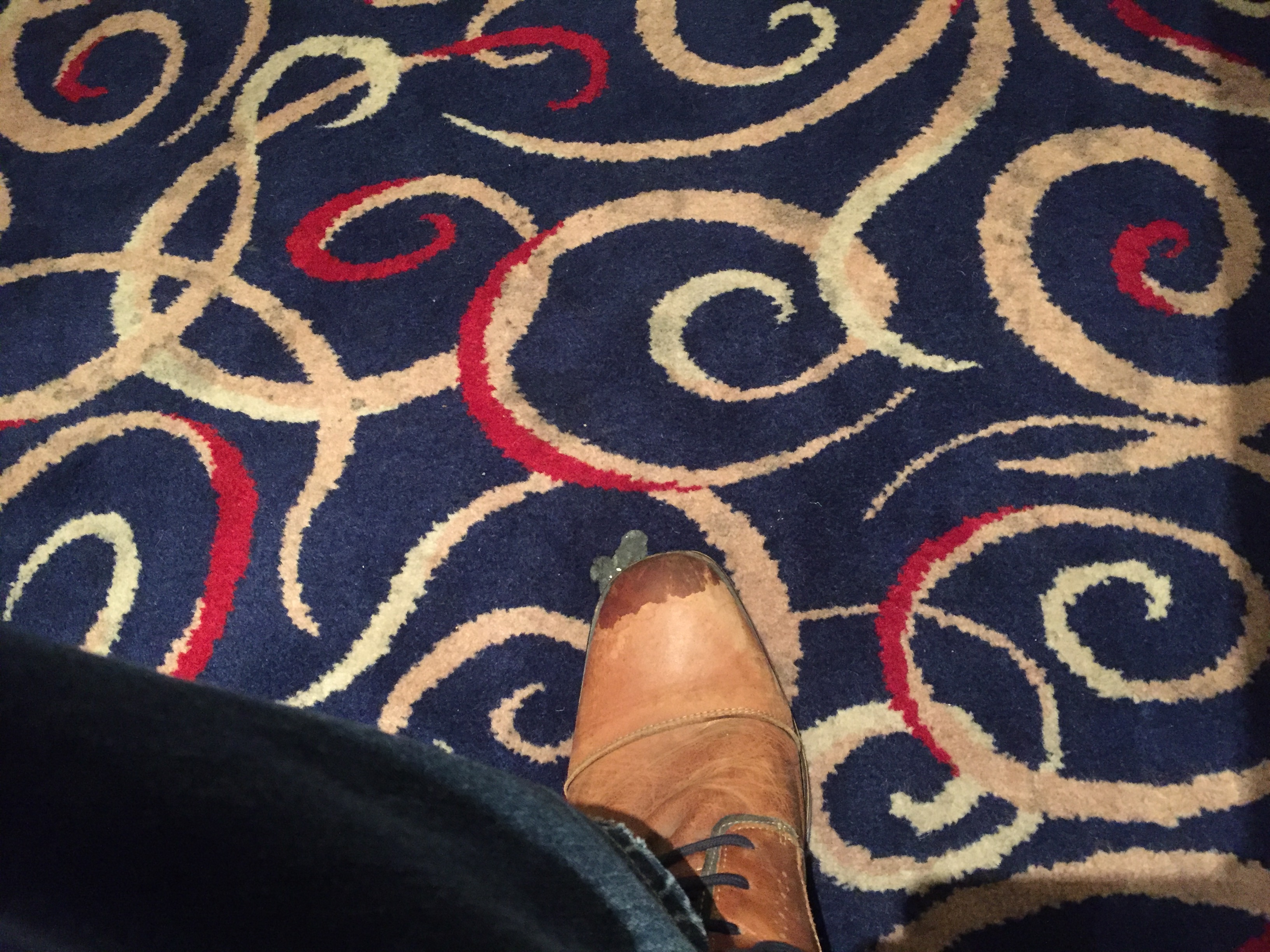
Rockingham Arms, Elephant and Castle

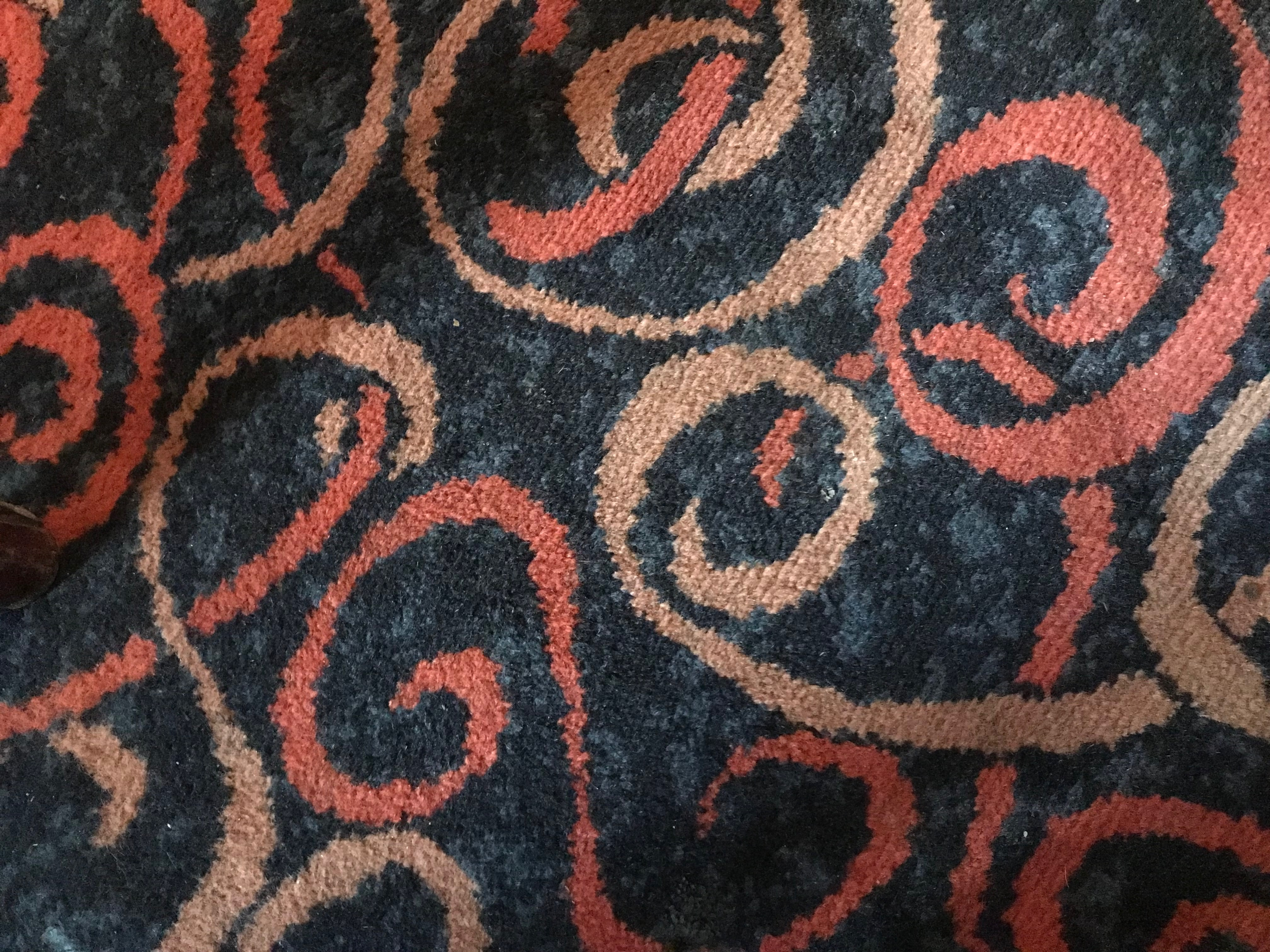
The King and Castle, Windsor

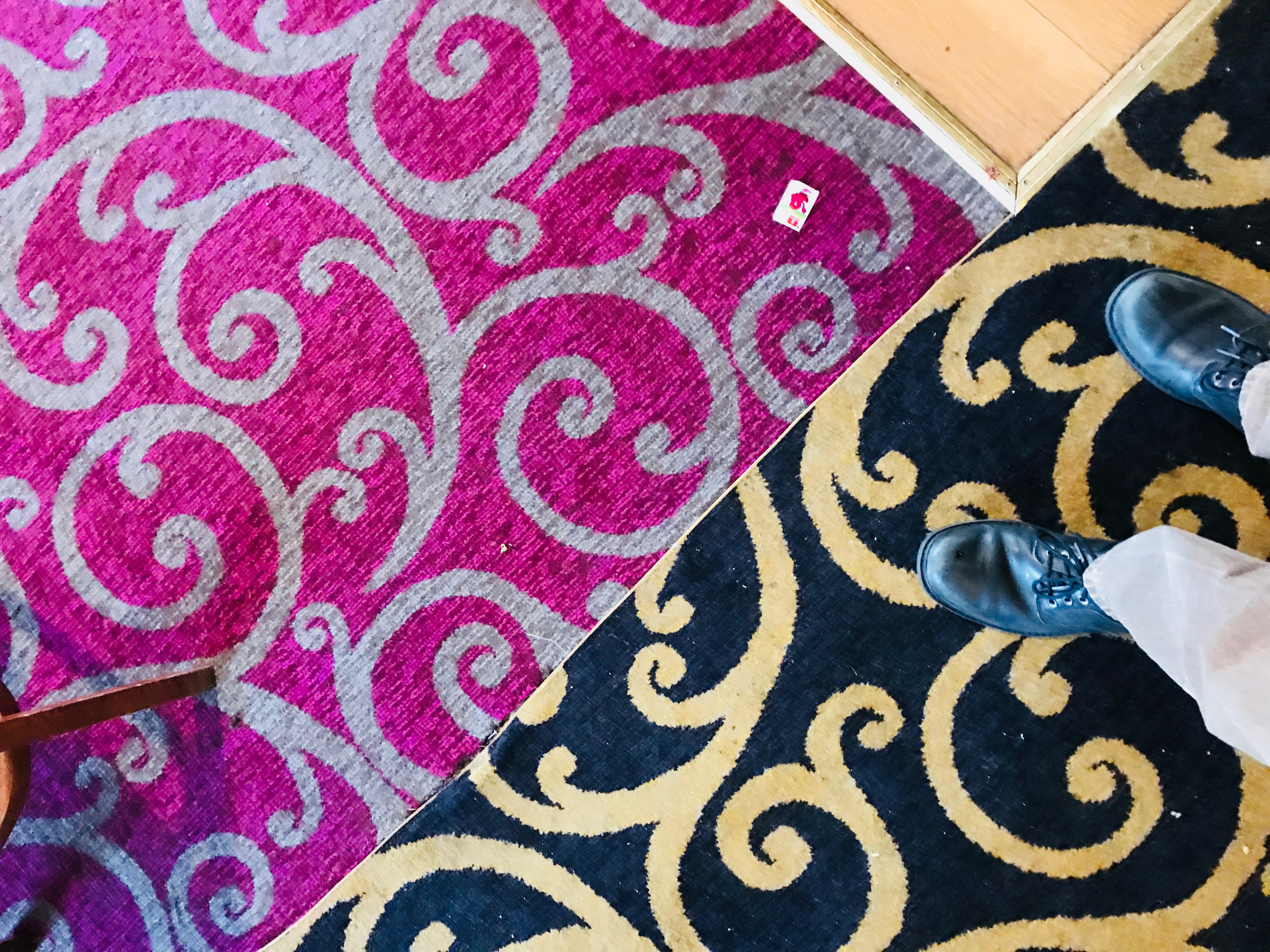
Wetherspoons, Milton Keynes

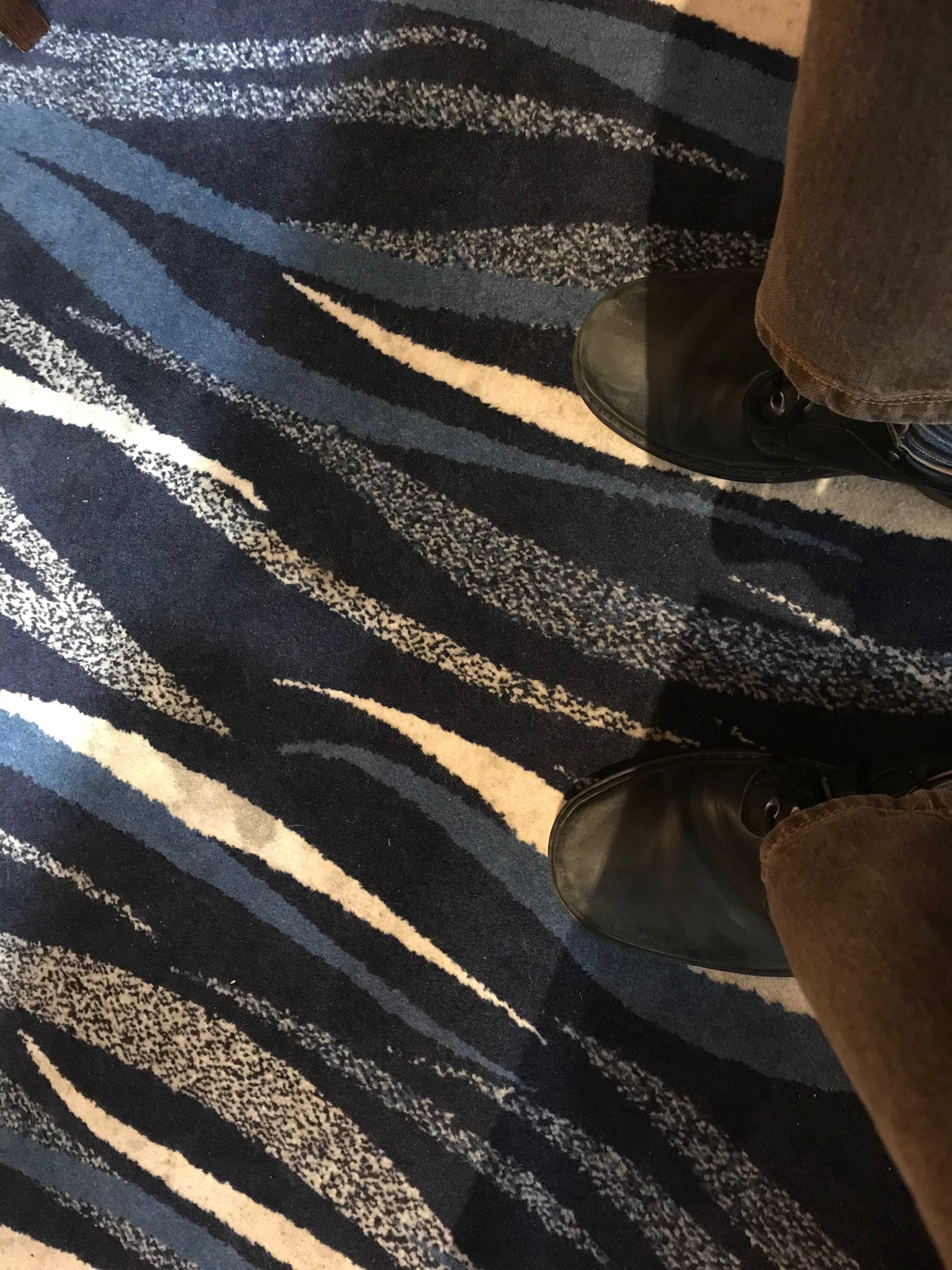
Moon Under Water, Milton Keynes

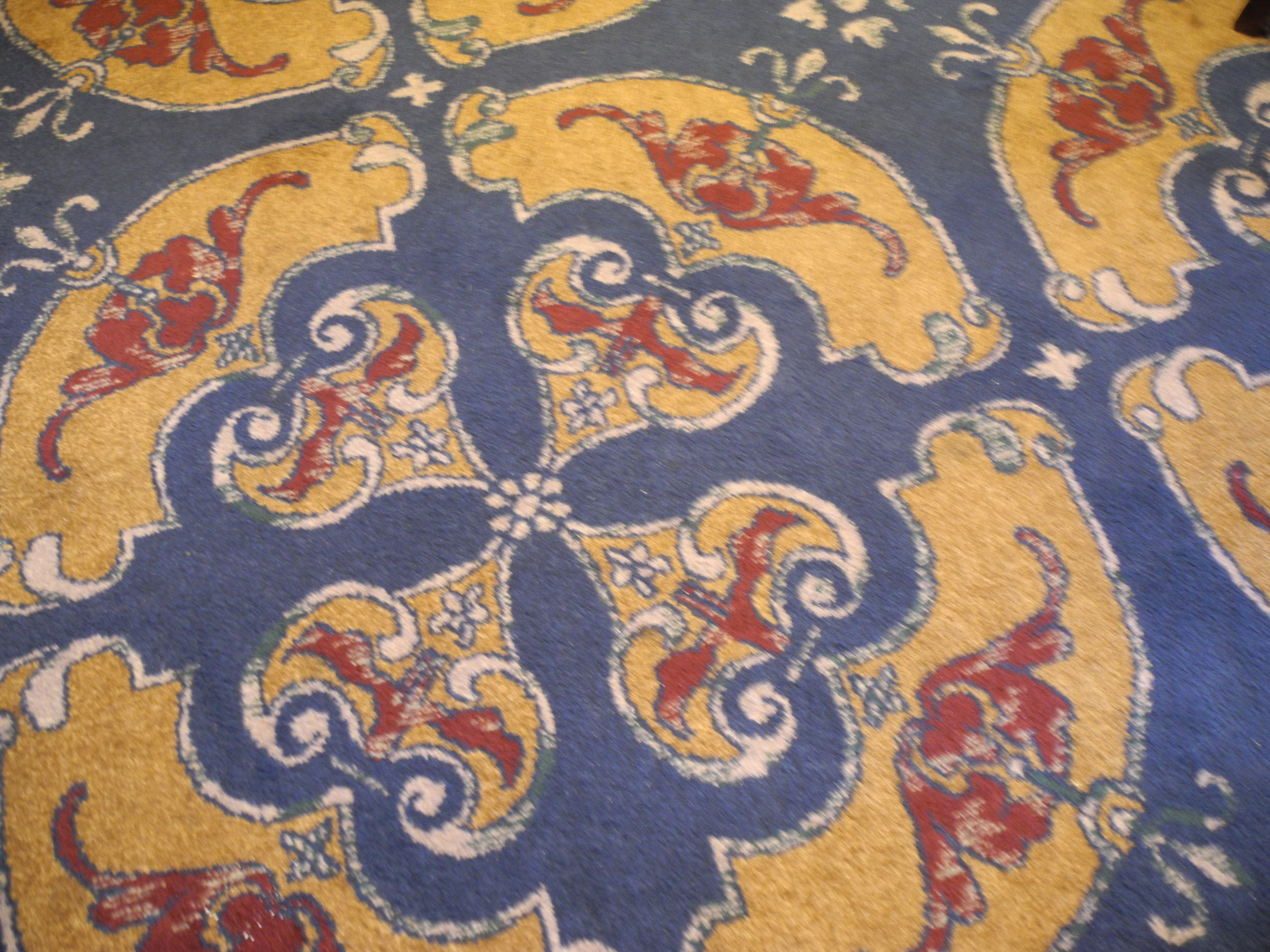
The White Lady, Corstorphine

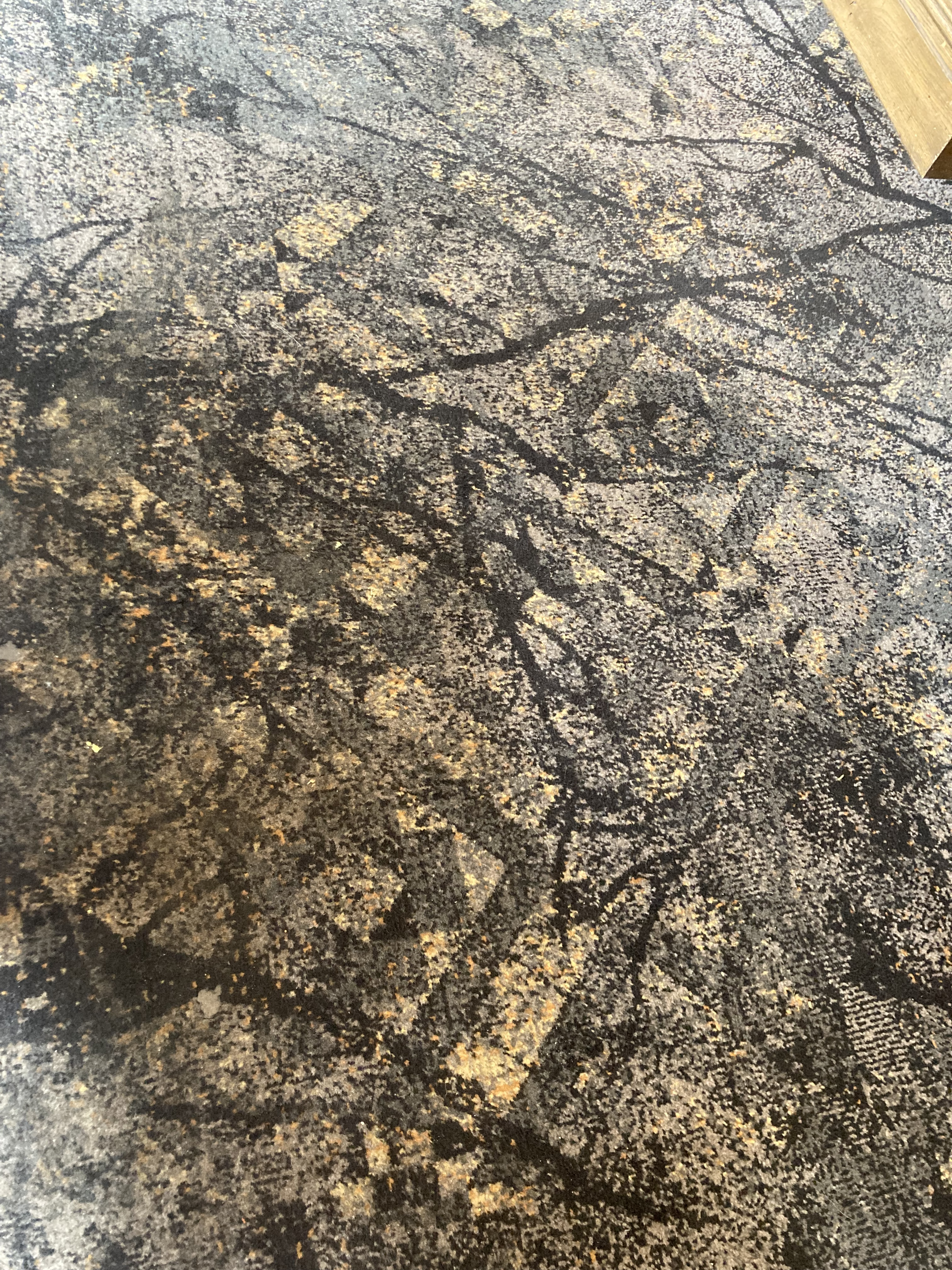
The Great Wood, Blanchardstown

== Publications ==
The company produces an in-house magazine, Wetherspoon News, which contains information on the company's activities, its employees, pubs, political views and comments on recent media mentions. The chain also offers a mobile app and provides on menu QR codes from which customers can order food and drink to their table to avoid queuing at the bar, even from outside the pub.

== See also ==
- McMenamins, an American chain notable for its use of historic properties
