= Darren Meredith =

Australian rugby league footballer

Personal information
- Full name: Darren Lee Meredith
- Born: 14 August 1962 (age 63)
- Height: 183 cm (6 ft 0 in)
- Weight: 82 kg (12 st 13 lb)

Playing information
- Position: Centre, Wing
Club
| Years | Team | Pld | T | G | FG | P |
|---|---|---|---|---|---|---|
| 1985 | Canterbury-Bankstown | 1 | 0 | 0 | 0 | 0 |
| 1986–87 | Canberra Raiders | 7 | 0 | 0 | 0 | 0 |
| 1988 | Newcastle Knights | 2 | 0 | 0 | 0 | 0 |
| | Total | 10 | 0 | 0 | 0 | 0 |

Darren Meredith (born 14 August 1962) is an Australian former professional rugby league footballer who played in the 1980s. He played for the Canterbury-Bankstown Bulldogs in 1985, the Canberra Raiders in 1986 - 1987 and the Newcastle Knights in 1988.

== Playing career ==
Meredith made his first grade debut for Canterbury-Bankstown in Round 26 1985 against Western Suburbs. Meredith did not feature in the club's 1985 premiership victory over St George.

In 1986, Meredith joined Canberra spending 2 seasons with them before signing with newly admitted club Newcastle in 1988.

Meredith played 2 games for Newcastle with his last being a 14–4 defeat against Western Suburbs in Round 17 1988.
