= Richardson Cup =

Field hockey competition in Ulster, Ireland

The Richardson Cup is a hockey competition for the boys' under-15 teams from schools affiliated to the Ulster Branch of the Irish Hockey Association. The trophy is currently held by Friends School Lisburn after a comprehensive 5-0 win over Regent in 2017. This particular Friends team has now won 3 cups in a row: the Ferris Cup, the Bannister Bowl and the Richardson Cup.

== Trophy ==
The Richardson Cup was presented by Mr R Richardson. The trophy has been dominated recently by Banbridge Academy as they had a winning streak of eleven straight wins following their win in 2009-10. This streak finally came to an end in the 2010-11 season with defeat in the quarter-final to Campbell College.

== Format ==
The trophy is competed for through an open draw competition. In 2016-17 seventeen schools entered a team. To qualify to play on a team, boys must be 15 years of age and under on 30 June immediately preceding the season of play.

== Finals ==
=== 1940s ===
Year	Winner			Runner-up	Notes
1946-47	Omagh Academy	6	0	Ballycastle High School	
1947-48	Bushmills Grammar School	1	0	Omagh Academy	
1948-49	Banbridge Academy				

=== 1950s ===
Year	Winner			Runner-up	Notes
1949-50	Friends School Lisburn	6	1	Banbridge Academy	
1950-51	Newry Grammar School			Ballycastle High School	
1951-52	Banbridge Academy				
1952-53	Cookstown High School	4	3	Newry Grammar School	
1953-54	Banbridge Academy	1	0	Royal & Prior School, Raphoe	
1954-55	Friends School Lisburn				
1955-56	Wallace High School			Friends School Lisburn	
1956-57	Wallace High School				
1957-58	Bushmills Grammar School			Wallace High School	Replay - Game 1: 0-0
1958-59	Friends School Lisburn				

=== 1960s ===
Year	Winner			Runner-up	Notes
1959-60	Royal Belfast Academical Institution	5	0	Banbridge Academy	
1960-61	Ashfield Secondary School & Wallace High School	0	0	TROPHY SHARED	
1961-62	Wallace High School	2	0	Friends School Lisburn	
1962-63	Ashfield Secondary School				
1963-64	Friends School Lisburn	2	1	Ashfield Secondary School	
1964-65	Cookstown High School & Wallace High School	0	0	TROPHY SHARED	
1965-66	Cookstown High School	4	0	Methodist College Belfast	
1966-67	Friends School Lisburn & Royal and Prior, Raphoe	0	0	TROPHY SHARED	
1967-68	Cookstown High School	3	1	Kilkeel High School	
1968-69	Cookstown High School	1	0	Methodist College Belfast	

=== 1970s ===
Year	Winner			Runner-up	Notes
1969-70	Cookstown High School & Newry High School			TROPHY SHARED	
1970-71	Cookstown High School	3	0	Newry High School	
1971-72	Kilkeel High School				
1972-73	Newry High School			Friends School Lisburn	
1973-74	Friends School Lisburn			Newry High School	
1974-75	Newry High School	1	0	Friends School Lisburn	
1975-76	Cookstown High School	1	0	Newtownbreda Secondary School	
1976-77	Friends School Lisburn	2	0	Cookstown High School	
1977-78	Newry High School & Royal & Prior School, Raphoe			TROPHY SHARED	
1978-79	Bangor Grammar School				

=== 1980s ===
Year	Winner			Runner-up	Notes
1979-80	Newry High School				
1980-81	Newry High School & Wallace High School			TROPHY SHARED	
1981-82	Newry High School				
1982-83	Banbridge Academy				
1983-84	Royal Belfast Academical Institution				
1984-85	Royal & Prior, Raphoe	4	0		
1985-86	Cookstown High School				
1986-87	Bangor Grammar School			Annadale Grammar School	
1987-88	Royal Belfast Academical Institution	0	0	Portadown College	RBAI won 4-2 on penalties
1988-89	Portadown College				

=== 1990s ===
Year	Winner			Runner-up	Notes
1989-90	Bangor Grammar School & Sullivan Upper School			TROPHY SHARED	
1990-91	Banbridge Academy				
1991-92	Royal Belfast Academical Institution				
1992-93	Royal Belfast Academical Institution	1	0	Methodist College Belfast	
1993-94	Friends School Lisburn	1	0	Kilkeel High School	
1994-95	Cookstown High School	2	1	Royal Belfast Academical Institution	
1995-96	Royal Belfast Academical Institution	3	0	Cookstown High School	
1996-97	Regent House, Newtownards	5	2	Royal Belfast Academical Institution	
1997-98	Sullivan Upper School				
1998-99	Cookstown High School				

=== 2000s ===
Year	Winner			Runner-up	Notes
1999-00	Banbridge Academy				
2000-01	Banbridge Academy				
2001-02	Banbridge Academy				
2002-03	Banbridge Academy				
2003-04	Banbridge Academy	3	1	Royal Belfast Academical Institution	
2004-05	Banbridge Academy			Friends School Lisburn	
2005-06	Banbridge Academy	2	0	Cookstown High School	
2006-07	Banbridge Academy	1	0	Wallace High School	
2007-08	Banbridge Academy	3	0	Wallace High School	
2008-09	Banbridge Academy	3	2	Cookstown High School	

=== 2010s ===
Year	Winner			Runner-up	Notes
2009-10	Banbridge Academy	5	0	Sullivan Upper School	
2010-11	Campbell College & Cookstown High School	2	2	TROPHY SHARED	
2011-12	Banbridge Academy	2	1	Friends School Lisburn	
2012-13	Sullivan Upper School	3	1	Wallace High School, Lisburn	
2013-14	Wallace High School				
2014-15					
2015-16					
2016-17	Friends' School	5	0	Regent House School	
2017-18	Banbridge Academy	4	2	Cookstown High School	
2018-19	Sch1			Sch2	
2019-20	Sch1			Sch2	
2020-21	Sch1			Sch2	
2021-22	Banbridge Academy	5	0	RBAI	
2022-23	RBAI	6	3	Bangor Grammar School	
2023-24	Cookstown High School	2	1	RBAI	
2024-25	Cookstown High School	2	0	RBAI	
2025-26	Sch1			Sch2	
