= Ian Sloan (field hockey) =

Northern Irish field hockey player (b. 1993)

Personal information
- Born: 19 November 1993 (age 32) County Tyrone, Northern Ireland
- Height: 180 cm (5 ft 11 in)
- Weight: 75 kg (165 lb)

Sport
- Sport: Field hockey
- Position: Midfielder / Defender
Youth career
- Years: Team
- 2007–2009: Cookstown High School
Senior career
Years	Team	Caps	Goals
20xx–2012	Cookstown	-	-
2012–2014	Loughborough Students	-	-
2014–2024	Wimbledon	-	-
2024–2026	Old Georgians	-	-
National team
Years	Team	Caps	Goals
2011–2012	Ireland	21	-
2015–present	England & GB	118	(5)
Coaching career
- –: Loughborough Students II
- –: Wycombe
Medal record
Representing England
Commonwealth Games
Bronze medal – third place	2018 Gold Coast	Team
Bronze medal – third place	2022 Birmingham	Team
European Championships
Bronze medal – third place	2017 Amstelveen
- Updated on 4 February 2022

Ian Martin Sloan (born 19 November 1993) is a Northern Irish field hockey player, who plays as a midfielder for Old Georgians and the England and Great Britain national teams. He represented Great Britain at the 2016 Summer Olympics and was a member of the England teams that won the bronze medals at the 2018 Commonwealth Games, 2022 Commonwealth Games and at the 2017 Men's EuroHockey Nations Championship. He also represented England at the 2018 Men's Hockey World Cup.

== Early years, family and education ==
Sloan is the youngest son of Martin and Adele Sloan. Martin Sloan is a former Ireland captain and Great Britain field hockey international. Adele Sloan is a former Ireland women's field hockey international and between 2007 and 2013 was the head teacher at Cookstown High School. Sloan's brother, Stephen, is also a field hockey player and has played for Cookstown. Sloan was educated at Cookstown High School and Loughborough University.

== Club career ==
Between 2007 and 2009 Sloan was a member of the Cookstown High School team that won the All Ireland Schoolboys Hockey Championship and two successive Burney Cup/McCullough Cup doubles. Among his teammates were his brother Stephen and David Ames. In 2007 Sloan scored in the All Ireland final as Cookstown High defeated Banbridge Academy 4–2. In 2007–08 he won the McCullough Cup, again defeating Banbridge Academy in the final and in the 2007–08 Burney Cup final defeated the Royal and Prior School of Raphoe 6–3 after extra time. In the 2008–09 McCullough Cup final Sloan scored as Cookstown High defeated Sullivan Upper School 3–0 in the final. In the 2008–09 Burney Cup final Sloan scored a hat-trick as Cookstown High defeated Banbridge Academy 4–3 in the final.

During his early Cookstown career, Sloan played in the seconds with his brother, Stephen, and his father Martin. In 2010–11 Sloan won the Irish Senior Cup, scoring twice in a 4–3 win against Monkstown and was subsequently named player of the match. Sloan also played for Cookstown in the Men's Irish Hockey League and the 2011–12 Euro Hockey League.

While attending Loughborough University and studying for a degree in Accounting and Financial Management, Sloan played for Loughborough Students in the Men's English Hockey League and at intervarsity level and coached the university's second team in the Midlands League.

In 2014 Sloan switched clubs from relegated Loughborough to Wimbledon and subsequently helped the team win four successive Men's English Hockey League titles in 2014–15, 2015–16, 2016–17 and 2017–18. He has represented Wimbledon in the 2016–17, 2017–18, and 2018–19 Euro Hockey Leagues.

In 2024 Sloan joined Old Georgians as both a player and as director of hockey for the club's junior section.

== International career ==
=== Ireland ===
Sloan captained the Ireland Under-18 team at the 2011 EuroHockey U18 Championship. He was the topscorer in the tournament, scoring seven of Ireland's 10 goals. Between 2011 and 2012, Sloan made 21 senior international appearances for Ireland. In June 2011 he made his senior debut for Ireland against China. He subsequently represented Ireland at the 2011 Men's EuroHockey Nations Championship and at a 2012 Men's Field Hockey Olympic Qualifier. In April 2012 Sloan made his last appearance for Ireland in a 2–1 away win against Germany. Sloan and David Ames both scored for Ireland. In January 2013 Sloan and Ames announced that they were switching allegiances from Ireland to England/Great Britain.

=== Great Britain ===
Having previously played for Ireland, Sloan had to wait for three years before he was eligible to play for Great Britain. He eventually made his debut for Great Britain in April 2015 in a 3–2 win against Germany in an unofficial international. He made his official debut for Great Britain on 14 May 2015, in a 1–1 draw against Argentina. He subsequently represented Great Britain at the 2016 Summer Olympics. Sloan captained Great Britain when they won the 2017 Sultan Azlan Shah Cup. In May 2017, together with George Pinner and Phil Roper, Sloan was named as one of three captains of England/Great Britain.

Sloan was selected to represent Great Britain for the delayed 2020 Olympic Games in Tokyo.

=== England ===
Sloan has represented England at the 2017 Men's EuroHockey Nations Championship, the 2018 Commonwealth Games (where he won a bronze medal) and the 2018 Men's Hockey World Cup. he won another bronze medal with England in the Men's tournament at the 2022 Commonwealth Games in Birmingham.

Tournaments	Place	Team
2011 Men's EuroHockey Nations Championship	5th	Ireland
2012 Men's Field Hockey Olympic Qualifier	2nd	Ireland
2014–15 Men's FIH Hockey World League Final	6th	Great Britain
2016 Men's Hockey Champions Trophy	4th	Great Britain
2016 Summer Olympics	9th	Great Britain
2017 Sultan Azlan Shah Cup	1st	Great Britain
2016–17 Men's FIH Hockey World League Semi-finals	3rd	England
2016–17 Men's FIH Hockey World League Final	8th	England
2017 Men's EuroHockey Nations Championship	3rd place, bronze medalist(s)	England
2018 Sultan Azlan Shah Cup	2nd	England
2018 Commonwealth Games	3rd place, bronze medalist(s)	England
2018 Men's Hockey World Cup	4th	England
2019 Men's FIH Pro League	4th	Great Britain
2019 Men's EuroHockey Nations Championship	5th	England

== Field hockey coach ==
Wycombe in the South League.

== Honours ==
Great Britain

- Sultan Azlan Shah Cup
  - Winners: 2017

England

- Sultan Azlan Shah Cup
  - Runners up: 2018

Ireland

- Men's Field Hockey Olympic Qualifier
  - Runners up: 2012

Wimbledon

- Men's English Hockey League
  - Winners: 2014–15, 2015–16, 2016–17, 2017–18: 4

Cookstown

- Irish Senior Cup
  - Winners: 2011: 2

Cookstown High School

- All Ireland Schoolboys Hockey Championship
  - Winners: 2007: 1
- Burney Cup
  - Winners: 2007–08, 2008–09: 2
- McCullough Cup
  - Winners: 2007–08, 2008–09: 2
