= Sean Murray (field hockey) =

Ireland men's hockey international

Personal information
- Born: 5 May 1997 (age 29) Detroit, United States

Sport
- Sport: Field hockey
- Position: Midfielder
- Club: Gantoise
Youth career
- Years: Team
- 2008–2015: Wallace High School
- 2014: → Ulster U18
Senior career
Years	Team	Caps	Goals
2014–2018	→ Ireland U21	-	-
2014–2016	Lisnagarvey	-	-
2018–2020	Rotterdam	-	-
2020–2022	Leuven	-	-
2022–present	Gantoise	-	-
National team
Years	Team	Caps	Goals
2015–present	Ireland	78	-
- Updated on 2 July 2020

Sean Murray (born 5 May 1997) is an Irish field hockey player who plays as a midfielder for Belgian Hockey League club Gantoise and the Irish national team.

He represented Ireland at the 2018 Men's Hockey World Cup. At club level, he was a member of the Lisnagarvey team that won the 2015–16 Men's Irish Hockey League title.

== Early years, family and education ==
Murray was educated at Wallace High School and at Queen's University Belfast, where he gained a maths degree. His father, Mark Murray, is involved with Lisnagarvey Hockey Club in various roles including as a coach, and several of his siblings are also field hockey players.

== Domestic teams ==
=== Wallace High School ===
In 2013–14 Murray was a member of the Wallace High School team that won a McCullough Cup/Burney Cup double. Murray scored in both finals. He also played for Wallace High School in the 2014 All Ireland Schoolboys Hockey Championship final, when they lost 3–1 to St. Andrew's College. He also played in the 2014–15 McCullough Cup final. He captained Wallace High School when they retained the Burney Cup in 2014–15. While playing for Wallace High School, Murray also represented Ulster U18 at inter-provincial level.

=== Lisnagarvey ===
During the 2014–15 season, Murray became an established member of the Lisnagarvey first team. In 2015–16, along with Jonathan Bell, Michael Watt and Paul Gleghorne, Murray was a member of the Lisnagarvey team that won the Men's Irish Hockey League and the EY Champions Trophy. Murray and Lisnagarvey also reached the final of the Irish Senior Cup but lost to Monkstown after a penalty shoot-out. Murray also played and scored for Lisnagarvey in the 2016–17 Euro Hockey League.

=== Playing abroad ===
In 2018 Murray began playing for HC Rotterdam in the Dutch Hoofdklasse. After two seasons he left Rotterdam for Leuven in Belgium. At Leuven he also only stayed for two seasons and left them in 2022 for Gantoise.

== Ireland international ==
Murray made his senior debut for Ireland in October 2015 in a 2–2 draw with Argentina. He has previously represented Ireland at under-18 and under-21 levels. In March 2017 Murray helped Ireland win a 2016–17 Men's FIH Hockey World League Round 2 tournament. In June 2017 Murray was also a member of the Ireland team that won the Hamburg Masters, defeating Germany 4–2 in the final.

Tournaments	Place
2016–17 Men's FIH Hockey World League Round 2	1st
2017 Hamburg Masters	1st
2016–17 Men's FIH Hockey World League Semifinals	5th
2017 Men's EuroHockey Nations Championship	6th
2018 Sultan Azlan Shah Cup	6th
2018 Men's Four Nations Cup	4th
2018 Men's Hockey World Cup	14th
2018–19 Men's FIH Series Finals	2nd
2019 Men's EuroHockey Nations Championship	8th

== Honours ==
Ireland

- Hamburg Masters
  - Winners: 2017
- Men's FIH Hockey World League Round 2
  - Winners: 2017 Belfast
- Men's FIH Series Finals
  - Runners up: 2019 Le Touquet

Lisnagarvey

- Men's Irish Hockey League
  - Winners: 2015–16
- EY Champions Trophy
  - Winners: 2016
- Irish Senior Cup
  - Runners up: 2015–16

Wallace High School

- All Ireland Schoolboys Hockey Championship
  - Runners up: 2014
- Burney Cup
  - Winners: 2014, 2015
- McCullough Cup
  - Winners: 2013
  - Runners up: 2014
