= David Ames (field hockey) =

Great Britain field hockey international

Personal information
- Full name: David Vincent Leslie Ames
- Born: 25 June 1989 (age 37) Durban, South Africa
- Height: 1.88 m (6 ft 2 in)
- Weight: 82 kg (181 lb)

Sport
- Sport: Field hockey
- Position: Midfielder / Defender
Youth career
- Years: Team
- 2001–2009: Cookstown High School
Senior career
Years	Team	Caps	Goals
20xx–2010	Cookstown	-	-
2009	→ Ulster Elks	-	-
2010–2016	Beeston	-	-
2016–2019 2023–2024	Holcombe	-	-
2021–2022	Oranje-Rood	-	-
2024–2026	Old Georgians	-	-
National team
Years	Team	Caps	Goals
2008–2012	Ireland	64	-
2015–present	England and GB	119	(4)
Coaching career
- 2010–2011: Repton School
- 2011–2012: Nottingham Trent University
- 2012–2015: University of Nottingham
Medal record
Representing England
EuroHockey Championship
Silver medal – second place	2023 Mönchengladbach
Bronze medal – third place	2017 Amsterdam

David Vincent Leslie Ames (born 25 June 1989) is a Northern Irish field hockey player, who plays as a defender or midfielder for Old Georgians and played for the England and Great Britain national teams.

He represented Great Britain at the 2016 Summer Olympics, 2020 Summer Olympics and 2024 Summer Olympics. He was a member of the England team that won the bronze medal at the 2017 Men's EuroHockey Nations Championship. He also represented England at the 2018 Men's Hockey World Cup.

== Career ==
Ames attended Cookstown High School between 2001 and 2009, where between 2007 and 2009 he captained the team that won the All Ireland Schoolboys Hockey Championship and two successive Burney Cup/McCullough Cup doubles. In the 2007–08 Burney Cup final Ames scored four goals in the 6–3 extra time win over the Royal and Prior School of Raphoe. In the 2008–09 McCullough Cup final Ames scored twice when beating Sullivan Upper School 3–0 in the final and in the 2008–09 Burney Cup final Ames opened the scoring as Cookstown High defeated Banbridge Academy 4–3 in the final.

In 2008–09 Ames was a member of the Cookstown team that played in the Irish Senior Cup final, losing 6–0 to Pembroke Wanderers. He was part of the Ulster Elks at intervarsity level, helping them win the 2009 Mauritius Cup.

Between 2008 and 2012, Ames made 64 senior international appearances for Ireland. He was a member of the Ireland team that won the 2011 Men's Hockey Champions Challenge II. He also represented Ireland at the 2009 Men's Hockey World Cup Qualifiers, the 2011 Men's EuroHockey Nations Championship and at a 2012 Men's Field Hockey Olympic Qualifier. In April 2012 Ames made his last appearance for Ireland in a 2–1 away win against Germany. Ames and Ian Sloan both scored for Ireland. In January 2013 Ames and Sloan announced that they were switching allegiances from Ireland to England/Great Britain in order to represent the British team at the Olympic Games.

Between 2010 and 2016 Ames played for Beeston in the Men's England Hockey League Premier Division. He also played for Beeston in the Euro Hockey League In 2015–16 Ames was voted Player's Player of the Year in the Men's English Hockey League. Ames left Beeston for Holcombe, where he played from 2016 to 2019.

Having previously played for Ireland, Ames had to wait for three years before he was eligible to play for Great Britain. He eventually made his debut for Great Britain in April 2015 in a 3–2 win against Germany in an unofficial international. He made his official debut for Great Britain on 14 May 2015, in a 1–1 draw against Argentina. He subsequently represented Great Britain at the 2016 Summer Olympics, the 2020 Olympic Games and was selected to represent Great Britain at the 2024 Olympic Games. The team went out in the quarter-finals after losing a penalty shootout to India. Ames also represented England at the 2015 and 2017 Men's EuroHockey Nations Championships, and the 2018 Men's Hockey World Cup.

In April 2021 he signed a 1-year contract at Dutch Hoofdklasse club Oranje-Rood for the 2021–22 season. He won a silver medal with England at the 2023 Men's EuroHockey Championship in Mönchengladbach.

After another season with Holcombe, Ames joined Old Georgians and helped them finish runner-up to Surbiton during the 2024–25 Men's England Hockey League season.

Ames announced his retirement from international hockey in February 2025.

He won another Premier league title with Old Georgians in 2026.

== International record ==
Tournaments	Place	Team
2009 Men's Hockey World Cup Qualifiers	3rd	Ireland
2011 Men's Hockey Champions Challenge II	1st	Ireland
2011 Men's EuroHockey Nations Championship	5th	Ireland
2012 Men's Field Hockey Olympic Qualifier	2nd	Ireland
2014–15 Men's FIH Hockey World League Semifinals	3rd	Great Britain
2015 Men's EuroHockey Nations Championship	4th	England
2016 Men's Hockey Champions Trophy	4th	Great Britain
2016 Summer Olympics	9th	Great Britain
2016–17 Men's FIH Hockey World League Semifinals	3rd	England
2016–17 Men's FIH Hockey World League Final	8th	England
2017 Men's EuroHockey Nations Championship	3rd	England
2018 Men's Hockey World Cup	4th	England
2019 Men's FIH Pro League	4th	Great Britain
2019 Men's EuroHockey Nations Championship	5th	England
2021 Men's EuroHockey Nations Championship		England

== Field hockey coach ==
In addition to playing the game, Ames has also worked as a field hockey coach. He was a coach at Repton School between 2010 and 2011. During the 2011–12 season he was the head coach of the Nottingham Trent University first team. Between 2011 and 2017 he was a junior coach at Beeston. Between 2012 and 2015 he was coach of the University of Nottingham first team and in 2015 guided them to an intervarsity title. Since 2012 Ames has worked for MT13, a field hockey coaching company, and since 2013 he has served as a field hockey development officer at Rugby School.

== Honours ==
Ireland

- Men's Hockey Champions Challenge II
  - Winners: 2011
- Men's Field Hockey Olympic Qualifier
  - Runners up: 2012

Beeston

- Men's English Hockey League
  - Winners: 2010–11, 2012–13, 2013–14: 3
- Men's Cup Winners
  - Winners: 2010–11, 2011–12, 2015–16: 3

Ulster Elks

- Mauritius Cup
  - Winners: 2009: 1

Cookstown

- Irish Senior Cup
  - Runners up: 2008–09: 1

Cookstown High School

- All Ireland Schoolboys Hockey Championship
  - Winners: 2007: 1
- Burney Cup
  - Winners: 2007–08, 2008–09: 2
- McCullough Cup
  - Winners: 2007–08, 2008–09: 2
