= Cookstown High School =

Coordinates: 54.643°N 6.737°W

Location
- Coolnafranky Demesne; Molesworth Street; Cookstown; County Tyrone; BT80 8PQ; Cookstown; Northern Ireland

Information
- Other name: The High School, Cookstown
- Former names: Cookstown Academy; Cookstown College; Cookstown Secondary Intermediate School; Ladies' Boarding School
- Type: Secondary school
- Motto: Virtus Cum Scientia (Character Through Knowledge)
- Religious affiliation: Protestant
- Established: 1806
- Principal: Gwyneth Evans
- Gender: Mixed
- Age range: 11-18
- Enrollment: 885
- Colours: Black and light blue
- Website: https://www.cookstownhighschool.org

Cookstown High School is a combined grammar school and secondary school in Cookstown, County Tyrone, Northern Ireland. It is one of the largest in the area, falling within the Southern Region of the Education Authority.

Unlike many grammar providers in Northern Ireland, the school is not a selective school and does not make use of extra transfer tests, instead offering children grammar provision on the basis of their academic ability as evidenced through their primary school attainment.

== History and development ==
To economically provide for his growing family and in devotion to education as a Presbyterian minister, the Reverend Thomas Millar Senior founded the original Cookstown Academy in the Masonic Hall on the Fairhill Road, in 1806. Taking up profession as a teacher, he would establish the core principles of the school through the education of his son, Thomas Millar Junior, with emphasis in his curriculum on Biblical scripture and classical novels. In the following centuries, the school has undergone numerous structural changes, triggered by the founding of the Ladies' Boarding School by Eliza Remington and her sisters in Loy House on Chapel Street, in 1834. The school amalgamated with the Ladies' Boarding School in 1924, by which time it was known as Cookstown College. The school was renamed Cookstown High School in 1934, by which time it was a grammar school with nine rooms and 200 students. In 1951, the Tyrone Education Committee acquired Coolnafranky Demesne, allowing for a new building with more adequate facilities to be erected by 1955, adjacent to a newly created school, Cookstown Secondary Intermediate School. These two schools shared the site and several facilities until the 1970s.

With temporary governance changes in Northern Ireland such as the Local Government Act (Northern Ireland) 1972 causing the education sector to become administrated by direct rule, educational reforms became easier to introduce and so a plan was approved to merge Cookstown High School and Cookstown Secondary Intermediate School. By 1977, this plan was fully implemented and the two schools merged into one, using the badge and motto of the grammar school with a slightly amended uniform. The contemporary school has retained its academic tradition and focus, while also providing vocational pathways to ensure that all pupils are able to access the curriculum. Pupils are placed on differentiated pathways guided by their academic ability and educational needs.

In 1982, the Southern Education and Library board carried out approximately £3 million worth of extensions to the contemporary school building. This was followed by the addition of two science mobile classrooms in September 1995, after an urgent need for new science accommodation. By November 2002, under funding created from the Department of Education's Specialist Accommodation Programme, the school opened a new Technology and Design block, alongside four refurbished science laboratories. In 2024, the school alongside the neighboring Holy Trinity College, received an increase in funding from the Seamus McAleer Fund, allowing both schools to implement activities which intend to increase morale from students.

== Site ==
The school is situated on the Coolnafranky site in Cookstown, previously known as Loymount. It consists of the large nineteenth-century gentleman James Gunning's residence, Coolnafranky House. The house is a listed building and provides accommodation for School Council meetings, first-aid intervention, a kitchen and examinations for students with special educational needs. The school site contains several wooded areas. In addition to a tennis court, it also contains two artificial turf pitches used by both the school and Cookstown Hockey Club.

The school has five main buildings, housing the following facilities:

- Block 1: The 'Upper' Building - Millar Hall, Boys' Gym, Careers Suite, Technology, ICT, Art, English, History, Religious Education, Physical Education, Home Economics, Geography, Business Studies and Health and Social Care departments.
- Block 2: The Morrison (Middle) Building - General Office, Principal's and Vice-Principals' offices, Lecture Theatre, Library, New Careers Suite, The Refectory (Junior Canteen) and The Granary (Senior Canteen), War Memorial, the Music department and the Sixth Form Centre, comprising a common room and study areas.
- Block 3: The 'Lower' Building - McClay Hall, Modern Languages (French and Spanish), Maths, Biology and Physics departments.
- Block 4: The Learning Support Centre and changing rooms for the pitches.
- Block 5: New Science Building (Chemistry department).

== Motto ==
The school's primary motto is "Virtus Cum Scientia", which translates from Latin to "character through knowledge". Beyond this, the school also uses secondary mottos such as "Excellence, Opportunity, Support" and "Character Counts" in posters and assemblies throughout the year, intending to motivate students to achieve their academic and behavioural potential.

The school has also established nine 'School Aims', displaying their intentions as an academic institution that serves to 'develop the full potential of each pupil', enabling them to gain qualifications, acquire self-discipline and live within a caring school community. In the 2024–2025 academic year, four visual displays titled 'Our Mission', 'Our Ethos', 'Our Values' and 'Our Actions' were distributed around the school premises and made available to view on the school website, further emphasising such 'School Aims' to students, staff and visitors.

The school anthem is "Lead Me, Lord, Lead Me in Thy Righteousness" by Samuel Sebastian Wesley, most often used during Prize Day and other significant assemblies.

== Headteachers ==
=== Cookstown Academy ===
- Reverend Thomas Millar Senior (1806–1840)
- Mr John A. Smyth BA (1840–1861)
- Mr Samuel McMullan (1861–1877)
- Mr John McKenzie MA (1877–1901)
- Mr Harry Lindsay BA (1901–1908)
- Mr J. Rutledge BA (1908–1917)
- Mr W. J. Vaughan BA (1917–1934)

=== Ladies' Boarding School ===
- Misses Remington (1834–1861)
- Misses Matilda Miller (1861–1877)
- Misses Houston (1877–1918)
- Miss Rowan BA (1918–1934)

=== Cookstown High School (pre-merger) ===
- Mr William McNeill BA (1934–1959)
- Mr J. C. Cooper BSc (1959–1971)
- Canon Wilfred Young MA (1971–1977)

=== Cookstown Secondary Intermediate School ===
- Mr J. E. Donaghey BA (1955–1974)
- Mr W. K. Armstrong BSc (1974–1977)

=== Cookstown High School ===
- Canon Wilfred Young OBE MA (1977–1990)
- Dr Samuel McGuinness (1990–1997)
- Mr Keith Hamilton (Acting Principal) (1997–1998)
- Mr Barry Freestone (1998–2006)
- Mrs Adele Sloan (2006–2012)
- Mr Richard Marsh (Acting Principal) (2012–2013)
- Mr Graham Montgomery (2013–2018)
- Miss Gwyneth Evans (2018–present)

== Magazine and news ==
First introduced in 1959 as The Magazine and alternatively as The Coolnafranky Chronicle in 1961, the high school has released an annual publication chronicling its academic and sporting successes, changes within the teaching staff and significant individual achievements by pupils. The editorial team has previously been led by Mrs Nicola Hagan, Mrs Leanne Johnston and Mr Richard Brown, assisted by contributing subject departments and pupils. Reports and pictures are categorised by subject, devoting sections in each publication to pupils' academic, sporting and extra-curricular achievements, school traditions and yearly statements from the School Council, Head Boy and Head Girl.

In the 2000–2001 academic year, the school established the 'Net Set', to expand their presence on the internet. The team of pupils from Years 9–13 was led by Mr Robert Johnston and assisted by the Art Department, establishing the school's current website to showcase news regarding the latest school formal, musical and successes in hockey, with a signable guest book. Another website, chsweb.org.uk, was also established to promote extra-curricular activities, including the school's 'Animagic Club'.

In the 2004–2005 academic year, the school would launch an online news service in collaboration with IN-service.biz, operating the website high-days.com alongside a virtual newsletter system, from 15 March 2004 to 3 February 2005. As late as 22 June 2006, the school had relaunched this service as HighDaysOnline.com.

In the 2006–2007 academic year, the style of the magazine was reverted to its original A4 size, which had been abandoned in 2003.

Between the 2012–2014 academic years, the school expanded its digital presence with official Facebook and Twitter pages to share news online on a more frequent basis. In following academic years, subject-specific social media pages were created, including a Biology Twitter page and a Geography Instagram page. While both Twitter pages were discontinued by April 2024, the Facebook and Instagram pages continue to post updates regarding school events, academic achievements and sporting successes.

In the 2020–2021 academic year, the physical sale of the magazine was discontinued, and each publication has instead been uploaded onto the school's website.

== Sport ==
Sport is a fundamental part of life at the high school, with football, netball, hockey, rugby union, cross-country running and athletics being offered and regularly promoted.

The school is known for its preference for hockey. In the 2008–2009 season, the 1st XI won both the McCullough Cup and Burney Cup for the second year running, beating Sullivan Upper School and Banbridge Academy in the finals respectively. However, the school lost their Irish Schools crown after losing 3–2 to St. Andrew's College, Dublin. They reversed this result at the inaugural John Waring All Ireland Schoolboys Championship's final, defeating St. Andrew's College in the final by 2 goals.

In the 2006–2007 season, the boys' first team reached the semi-final of both the McCullough Cup and the All Ireland Schoolboys Hockey Championship, and the final of the Burney Cup.

In the 2007–2008 season, the boys' first team won the All Ireland Schoolboys Hockey Championship when they defeated the holders, Banbridge Academy, 4-2 in the final. This was followed six weeks later by a penalty shoot-out victory over the same opponents in the final of the McCullough Cup. The boys capped their season through completing the treble, by winning the Burney Cup against the Royal and Prior School. This marked the first season the school had achieved this feat.

In the 2023–2024 season, the boys' U13 team won the Bannister Bowl on penalty shootouts, after drawing 2-2 with Friends' School, Lisburn. Soon afterwards, the boys' U14 team won a seventh Ferris Cup title after winning 2-1 against the Royal Belfast Academical Institution. The boys' U15 team marked the school's 13th Richardson Cup victory after yet again winning 2-1 against the Royal Belfast Academical Institution, marking the first time that the high school had held a treble in junior hockey.

In the 2024–2025 season, the school achieved a second consecutive treble in junior hockey, after their various boys' teams won the Bannister Cup, the Ferris Cup in a 7-0 victory against Banbridge Academy, and the Richardson Cup.

== School traditions ==
There are a number of annual events at the high school. Prize Day is a tradition where particular pupils are formally congratulated and rewarded on their successes. The event consists of an academic procession with teaching staff wearing academic dress, while a special guest, often a former pupil of the school, is invited to speak in the latter half of the ceremony. Typically held in late September, it celebrates those who have excelled in their Key Stage 3, GCSE, AS and A-Level studies, along with eligible sporting achievements and contributions to school life.

The School Formal Dinner Dance is held in June. This event is organized by the Head Boy, Head Girl and Senior Prefects, and is attended by pupils from Sixth Form and Year 12 as well as many members of staff. In most years, a School Formal Video is also created to commemorate the departing Sixth Form students, featuring a montage of satirical and humorous clips based on school events.

Since 1985 and during most years, the CHS Society for Music and Drama has staged a play or musical in the Millar Hall. Performances usually run over two or three nights in October, and up to 100 pupils and staff regularly participate. The current Musical Director is Mrs Fiona Gormley, Head of the Music Department, while the role of director/producer has often varied (Conor O'Brien held the role for Oliver! in 2024 and for Charlie and the Chocolate Factory in 2025).

In November, remembrance assemblies are held in the Millar and McClay Halls, and at morning break a Service of Remembrance is held at the school war memorial in the Middle Building. The memorial was dedicated in 2013, in memory of former pupils and staff who died in the service of their country during World War I. It was designed by local artist Mr George Gourley, a past pupil and former Head of the Art Department. Wreaths are laid on behalf of pupils, the Former Pupils' Association and the Parents, Teachers and Friends Association, also being attended by members of the school community and representatives of the standing Board of Governors.

On the last day of the Christmas term, pupils and staff depart from the school early to visit Molesworth Presbyterian Church for the annual carol service. Music is provided by the junior, chamber and senior school choirs with additional performances from the string group, while Biblical lessons are read by Senior Prefects, the Senior Leadership Team and representatives of the wider school community. Governors and guests are afterwards invited to a reception in Coolnafranky House.

To promote the school for prospective Year 8 students, each January an Open Day (previously Open Night prior to the 2021–2022 academic year) is held over the weekend, where parents and children are invited to visit the school building. Typically, the event consists of an introductory assembly led by the Principal in the Millar Hall, followed by an extensive tour of each subject department, featuring a range of activities.

The Spring Concert is held close to Easter and offers an opportunity for pupils to showcase musical performances across a range of genres. The event is co-hosted by the Head Boy and Head Girl.

Each term typically concludes with a Final Assembly. At this event, the Senior Leadership Team acknowledge significant pupil achievement across the school, and update pupils through farewells to departing staff and the results of the house competition. In the summer term, a Key Stage 3 Celebration of Achievement is held, where the Senior Leadership Team present certificates and rewards for pupil achievement in Year 8, Year 9 and Year 10. Most notably in the 2024-2025 academic year, a number of trophies were presented and musical performances took place, led by students who partake in music extra-curricular activities.

== Incidents ==
In the academic year 2000–2001, around 70 pupils were unable to complete a GCSE English Literature exam, after the play Pygmalion was taught despite being present on the GCSE drama syllabus for that year. The exams council rectified the error by applying special consideration to affected pupils, solely marking their poetry and prose answers.

In February 2020, an incident of anti-social behaviour occurred at the Cookstown Leisure Centre, where a group of senior pupils intimidated people within the centre's cafe area, before firing snowballs at exiting cars. The school resolved the incident by reminding pupils of the Code of Conduct, under its Positive Behaviour Policy.

In the academic year 2024–2025, the school experienced significant criticism over its uniform policy, after pupils were required to wear full blazer when moving between classrooms, despite the increased temperature within the buildings. In the following year, the school would permit pupils to wear partial uniform on warmer summer days.

== Notable alumni ==
- Stuart Dallas, represented Northern Ireland at Euro 2016.
- Aaron Hughes, represented Northern Ireland at Euro 2016.
- Jackie Burns, footballer for Bristol City W.F.C.
- Nick Laird, novelist.
- Ernest Walton (1903–1995); Nobel Prize in Physics (1951); known for his part in "splitting the atom".
- Jimmy Kennedy O.B.E. (1902–1984); songwriter and lyricist.
- Sir Allen McClay (1932–2010); pharmacist and entrepreneur.
- Martin Sloan, captained Ireland at the 1990 Men's Hockey World Cup.
- Ian Sloan, represented Great Britain at the 2016 Summer Olympics.
- David Ames, represented Great Britain at the 2016 Summer Olympics.
- Lisa Bowman, netball international.
- Nick Griggs, middle and long-distance runner.
- Rowley Elliott (1877–1944); Unionist politician and Parliamentary Secretary to the Ministry of Labour from 1941 to 1943.
- Sandra Overend, Ulster Unionist Party politician and Member of the Legislative Assembly for Mid-Ulster from 2011 to 2017.
- James Mullin (1846–1920); Irish doctor and Nationalist.
- Robert Huey, former Chief Veterinary Officer for Northern Ireland.
- Maud Kells OBE (1939–2023); missionary in the Democratic Republic of Congo.
- Augustine Henry (1857–1930); sinologist and botanist.
