= McCullough Cup =

Field hockey competition in Ulster, Ireland

- Sport: Field hockey
- Founded: 1961-62
- No. of teams: 14 (season 2017-18)
- Most recent champion: Royal Belfast Academical Institution
- Most titles: Royal Belfast Academical Institution; 18 outright and 1 shared
- Website: http://www.ulsterhockey.com

The McCullough Cup is a hockey competition. It is an annual tournament played for by schools affiliated to the Ulster Branch of the Irish Hockey Association. The competition is held in the winter term of each school year, with the older Burney Cup running in the Spring term.

The most successful school is Royal Belfast Academical Institution with 19 wins (18 outright wins and 1 shared win). The current holder is Royal Belfast Academical Institution.

== Trophy ==
The trophy is called The Ian McCullough Memorial Cup. It was donated by a well-known family in Northern Ireland hockey circles, in memory of their son Ian.

Ian (full name – John Truesdale McCullough) was a 15-year-old Newry Grammar School pupil. He was accidentally killed after being struck by a hockey ball during a match against Royal Belfast Academical Institution at Bladon Drive on 3 December 1960.

== Teams ==
The teams that compete for this trophy are the strongest boys' first teams from schools in Ulster. All players must be under 18 on 1 July at the start of the year of the competition. Fourteen teams from thirteen schools competed for the trophy in the 2013–14 season.

== Format ==
The competition started out as a straight knockout event with the first winners being the defunct Bushmills Grammar School. However it was soon decided to move all matches to the winter term, with a league format introduced to provide all schools with a guaranteed number of fixtures.

Under the current format, all teams are divided into two pools, with each school playing all the other schools in their pool once. The top two teams from each pool qualify for the semi-finals.

In the semi-finals the teams in first place in the pools play the second place teams from the other pool.

The winners of the semi-final ties contest the final, which is usually played at a neutral venue on the second Wednesday in December.

== Performance by school ==
Performance Table
School	Wins	Shared Wins	Beaten Finalists	Total Finals	Last Title
Royal Belfast Academical Institution	18	1	6	25	2025-26
Cookstown High School	11	1	10	22	2011-12
Banbridge Academy	10	0	12	22	2023-24
Wallace High School, Lisburn	5	0	6	11	2018-19
Friends' School Lisburn	5	0	3	8	2019-20
Bangor Grammar School	3	1	5	9	1997-98
Sullivan Upper School	2	0	3	5	2017-18
Ballycastle High School	2	0	1	3	1964-65
Wellington College Belfast^{†}	2	0	1	3	1995-96
Newry High School	1	0	6	7	1966-67
Methodist College Belfast	1	0	4	5	1965-66
Bushmills Grammar School	1	0	0	1	1961-62
Regent House, Newtownards	1	0	0	1	1999-00
Kilkeel High School	0	1	2	3	1970-71
Royal & Prior School, Raphoe	0	0	3	3	NA

Footnote

- ^{†} Total includes Annadale Grammar School performance (one win and one beaten finalist). Wellington College was formed as a result of merger involving Annadale Grammar School.

== Finals ==
=== 1960s ===
Year	Winner			Runner-up	Notes
1961-62	Bushmills Grammar School	4	1	Newry Grammar School	
1962-63	Ballycastle High School	3	0	Annadale Grammar School	
1963-64	Cookstown High School	1	0	Newry Grammar School	
1964-65	Ballycastle High School	3	2	Newry Grammar School	
1965-66	Methodist College Belfast	1	0	Ballycastle High School	
1966-67	Newry High School	1	0	Royal Belfast Academical Institution	
1967-68	Annadale Grammar School	2	1	Methodist College Belfast	
1968-69	Royal Belfast Academical Institution	1	0	Cookstown High School	

=== 1970s ===
Year	Winner			Runner-up	Notes
1969-70	Royal Belfast Academical Institution	2	1	Cookstown High School	
1970-71	Royal Belfast Academical Institution & Kilkeel High School	0	0	TROPHY SHARED	after extra time
1971-72	Royal Belfast Academical Institution	1	0	Cookstown High School	
1972-73	Cookstown High School	2	0	Kilkeel High School	
1973-74	Cookstown High School	2	0	Newry High School	
1974-75	Royal Belfast Academical Institution	1	0	Friends School Lisburn	
1975-76	Cookstown High School & Bangor Grammar School	3	3	TROPHY SHARED	after extra time
1976-77	Friends School Lisburn	2	1	Cookstown High School	after extra time
1977-78	Friends School Lisburn	2	1	Cookstown High School	
1978-79	Cookstown High School	2	1	Bangor Grammar School	

=== 1980s ===
Year	Winner			Runner-up	Notes
1979-80	Friends School Lisburn	3	2	Cookstown High School	
1980-81	Friends School Lisburn	2	0	Newry High School	
1981-82	Wallace High School	0	0	Newry High School	Wallace HS won 5–4 on penalties
1982-83	Bangor Grammar School	3	1	Methodist College Belfast	
1983-84	Wallace High School	3	2	Bangor Grammar School	
1984-85	Cookstown High School	2	1	Royal Belfast Academical Institution	
1985-86	Banbridge Academy	1	0	Cookstown High School	
1986-87	Royal Belfast Academical Institution	1	1	Methodist College Belfast	R.B.A.I. won 3–2 on penalties
1987-88	Royal Belfast Academical Institution	1	1	Banbridge Academy	R.B.A.I. won 4–2 on penalties
1988-89	Wallace High School	2	0	Bangor Grammar School	

=== 1990s ===
Year	Winner			Runner-up	Notes
1989-90	Royal Belfast Academical Institution	4	0	Bangor Grammar School	
1990-91	Bangor Grammar School	2	2	Cookstown High School	Bangor GS won 3–1 on penalties
1991-92	Royal Belfast Academical Institution	3	2	Banbridge Academy	
1992-93	Royal Belfast Academical Institution	3	0	Banbridge Academy	
1993-94	Banbridge Academy	1	1	Royal Belfast Academical Institution	Banbridge won 3–1 on penalties
1994-95	Royal Belfast Academical Institution	1	0	Cookstown High School	
1995-96	Wellington College Belfast	2	1	Royal Belfast Academical Institution	
1996-97	Royal Belfast Academical Institution	5	2	Bangor Grammar School	after extra time
1997-98	Bangor Grammar School	3	0	Methodist College Belfast	
1998-99	Cookstown High School	3	0	Royal Belfast Academical Institution	

=== 2000s ===
Year	Winner			Runner-up	Notes
1999-00	Regent House, Newtownards	2	0	Royal & Prior School, Raphoe	after extra time
2000-01	Cookstown High School	1	0	Royal & Prior School, Raphoe	
2001-02	Royal Belfast Academical Institution	3	3	Kilkeel High School	R.B.A.I. won 4–1 on penalties
2002-03	Banbridge Academy	3	0	Cookstown High School	
2003-04	Royal Belfast Academical Institution	4	3	Banbridge Academy	
2004-05	Royal Belfast Academical Institution	2	1	Banbridge Academy	
2005-06	Banbridge Academy	4	1	Royal Belfast Academical Institution	
2006-07	Royal Belfast Academical Institution	6	1	Banbridge Academy	
2007-08	Cookstown High School	4	4	Banbridge Academy	Cookstown won 4–3 on penalties
2008-09	Cookstown High School	3	0	Sullivan Upper School	

=== 2010s ===
Year	Winner			Runner-up	Notes
2009-10	Banbridge Academy	4	2	Wallace High School	
2010-11	Cookstown High School	4	2	Banbridge Academy	
2011-12	Cookstown High School	5	3	Banbridge Academy	
2012-13	Banbridge Academy	3	1	Sullivan Upper School	
2013-14	Wallace High School	3	2	Friends School Lisburn	after extra time
2014-15	Banbridge Academy	2	1	Wallace High School	
2015-16	Sullivan Upper School	4	3	Wallace High School	
2016-17	Banbridge Academy	2	1	Royal & Prior School	
2017-18	Sullivan Upper School	2	2	Friends School Lisburn	Sullivan won 4–3 on penalties
2018-19	Wallace High School	2	2	Sullivan Upper School	Wallace won 4–3 on penalties

=== 2020s ===
Year	Winner			Runner-up	Notes
2019-20	Friends School Lisburn	3	0	Wallace High School	
2020-21	not played due to COVID-19 pandemic				
2021-22	Banbridge Academy	3	1	Wallace High School	
2022-23	Royal Belfast Academical Institution	7	6	Banbridge Academy	
2023-24	Banbridge Academy	1	0	Wallace High School	
2024-25	Royal Belfast Academical Institution	2	0	Banbridge Academy	
2025-26	Royal Belfast Academical Institution	3	1	Banbridge Academy	
