= Kyle Thomas (influencer) =

British social media personality (born 2004)

- Born: September 2004 (age 22); Kent, England
- Years active: 2019-present
- Known for: Rescued animals
- Mother: Zena Foord

TikTok information
- Page: kyle thomas 🌿
- Followers: 35.3 million
- Last updated: 31 August 2023

Kyle Thomas (born September 2004) is a British social media personality. He often posts videos about rescued animals. He began posting on TikTok in 2019, and as of 2023 he is estimated to be one of the highest-earning UK content creators on the platform.

== Personal life ==
Thomas was born in Kent in September 2004, but is now based in Belfast, Northern Ireland. Thomas was educated at Wallace High School, a coeducational voluntary grammar school in Lisburn, Northern Ireland. He left school aged 16 to focus on his social media career.

== Career ==
=== TikTok ===
Thomas started posting on TikTok in 2019, which is now his primary platform, after initially gaining some followers on Instagram. He often produces content featuring rescued animals, including his meerkat, Mylo. He is also known for comedy sketches, dancing, and food reviews.

In 2021, Thomas participated in a TikTok pop-up venue in a Westfield London shopping centre offering sessions on how to become an influencer, and what it is like creating for the platform. As of 25 March 2023, he was estimated to be the highest-earning TikTok personality in the United Kingdom.

=== TV ===
Thomas has given a number of television interviews. During a 15 August 2022 interview on ITV's This Morning, he mentioned that he earns a "comfortable income" from his work; the interviewers were criticised for their invasive questions about his income.

In 2023, Thomas appeared in a Channel 4 documentary about his ownership of exotic animals. In late 2024, Thomas appeared in the BBC Three documentary We Build a Zoo, which documented his experience building The Mylo Project with co-owner Phil Hughes.

In November 2026 Thomas, along with Chris Packham and Megan McCubbin, began co-presenting the wildlife series Naturewatch on BBC Two, BBC iPlayer and BBC Sounds.

=== Books ===
In July 2022 Thomas released the book Guardian of the Realm, a graphic novel featuring himself and his pet meerkat, Mylo.

=== Exotic animals ===
In August 2023, Thomas's mother, Zena Foord, faced legal consequences when she was found guilty of smuggling a capybara from England to Northern Ireland. The operation involved collaboration with a pet shop owner named Michael Dickinson and a man named James Hammond, who transported the animal. Foord, Dickinson, and Hammond were apprehended and admitted guilt during their appearance at Lisburn Magistrate's Court. They received two-year conditional discharges but were not sentenced to jail time.

The capybara later died, and the Department of Agriculture, Environment and Rural Affairs opened an investigation into Thomas. The investigation was later closed, having "found no welfare concerns". The police closed their investigation later in the month. Whilst the investigation was ongoing, Thomas stated that he would "not delete controversial animal-related content".

In early 2024, Thomas attempted to establish a zoo for his exotic animals but ultimately failed. The site closed in January 2024, and the animals were moved after his mother claimed that people were poisoning the animals. Commenting on the zoo, Ulster Society for the Prevention of Cruelty to Animals chief Nora Smith stated "The 'sanctuary' Kyle Thomas claims to be building implies rescuing and rehabilitating animals. The images we have seen on social media including the latest footage of some of these animals having now been moved to a shed [are], in our opinion, not acceptable. They belong in their native environment, rather than being used to win likes, shares and followers on social media."

=== Mylo Project ===
Following the sale of his previous zoo, Thomas shared that he believed it was a mistake to keep exotic animals in his home and continued championing animal rights. In late 2024, Thomas opened a new sanctuary with Irish builder Phil Hughes named The Mylo Project. Hughes purchased the site as a previous cornmill and converted it into an animal farm, where he offered to look after Thomas's animals.
