= Allen McClay =

Businessperson from Northern Ireland (1932 – 2010)

Sir Allen McClay
- Born: Allen McClay; 21 March 1932; Cookstown, County Tyrone, Northern Ireland
- Died: 12 January 2010 (aged 77); Philadelphia, Pennsylvania, U.S.
- Education: Cookstown High School
- Alma mater: Belfast College of Technology
- Occupations: Pharmacist, entrepreneur
- Title: CBE
- Spouse: Heather Topping (1983–2010; his death)

Sir Allen McClay CBE (21 March 1932 – 12 January 2010) was a Northern Irish multi-millionaire businessman and philanthropist who founded Galen (later Warner Chilcott), a pharmaceutical company which was Northern Ireland's first one billion pound business. After resigning from Galen in 2001, he went on to form a second successful pharmaceutical company, the Almac Group.

== Career ==
McClay was born in Cookstown, County Tyrone, in 1932 and was the youngest of six children. He attended Cookstown High School and Belfast College of Technology (now Belfast Metropolitan College) later qualifying as a pharmacist in 1953 after apprenticeship.

In 1955, he joined Glaxo, where he worked for 13 years as a medical rep, before co-founding the company, Galen, with his friend and fellow Pharmacist turned medical rep Bertie Robinson in Craigavon in 1968. Sir Allen and Bertie Robinson shared many investments together including the Connors Chemists chain and Galen Research. Sir Allen left Galen, which produces contraceptives and hormone replacement therapy drugs, in 2001, having become unhappy with the company's direction after its London Stock Exchange flotation in 1997. McClay retired from Galen on 31 September, and the following day rented accommodation close to the site Galen occupied for what would become his second successful company, Almac Sciences. McClay purchased five divisions of Galen Holdings plc. and formed Almac in January 2002. Almac provides services including research & development and manufacturing to other pharmaceutical companies such as Pfizer and GlaxoSmithKline. The company, whose turnover is £167m, employs more than 1500 people in Craigavon and has expanded into England, Scotland and the United States.

In 1973, McClay and Bertie Robinson invested in Connors Chemists, a pharmacy in Warrenpoint, which developed into a chain of branches across the UK managed by his brother Howard, and was sold to The Boots Company in 1998.

== Philanthropy ==
McClay established the McClay Trust in 1997, a charitable organisation which "support[s] research and development activities within" Queen's University Belfast. The trust has donated £20 million to the university, which has included sponsorship of PhD studentships at the university's Cancer Research centre. The trust also funded the £3.5m McClay Research Centre at the School of Pharmacy which opened in 2002, and contributed money to the building of the new University Library at Queen's, which opened in 2009 and is now named after McClay. Sir George Bain, a former vice-chancellor at Queen's, has described McClay as "the most significant philanthropist Northern Ireland has ever known". In recognition the university commissioned two portraits of McClay by local artist Ian Cumberland, one of which was gifted to his wife the other is on display in the library.

McClay was reported by the 2009 Sunday Times Rich List to be Northern Ireland's sixth richest person, with his wealth estimated at £190 million. In 2009, he used his wealth to establish the McClay Foundation, a charitable trust focused on cancer research.

McClay received an OBE in 1994, followed by a CBE in 2000 for contributions to the pharmaceutical industry in Northern Ireland. In the New Year Honours List of 2006 he was made Knight Bachelor for services to business and charity.

McClay married his partner Heather Topping in 2009 in the United States. He had no children. He died on 12 January at Hahnemann University Hospital in Philadelphia, Pennsylvania. He had been receiving treatment for cancer.
