= Alan Snoddy =

Northern Ireland football referee (born 1955)

Alan Snoddy MBE
- Born: 29 March 1955 (age 71); Belfast, Northern Ireland

Domestic
Years	League	Role
1979–2000	Irish League	Referee

International
Years	League	Role
1980–2000	FIFA–listed	Referee

Alan Gordon Snoddy MBE (born 29 March 1955) is a retired Northern Irish football referee, known for having refereed two matches in the FIFA World Cup: one in 1986 and one in 1990. At the 1986 World Cup Snoddy was appointed to referee the game between Morocco and Portugal in Guadalajara which ended 3–1 to Morocco. In the 1990 World Cup Snoddy refereed the game between Colombia and West Germany which ended 1–1 at the San Siro in Milan.

Snoddy served as Referee Development Officer for the Irish Football Association a position which he left in 2014 although he still works as a Referee Observer for both the Irish Football Association (IFA) and UEFA. He is also a member of the UEFA Referee Convention Panel and is widely used in assisting countries develop their refereeing structures.

He is a Senior Course Leader at the UEFA Referee Centre of Excellence coaching young promising referees.

He is also a FIFA Referee Technical Instructor conducting technical seminars regularly.

He worked for 2.5 years as the President of the Cyprus FA Referee Committee, and in February 2020 finished a spell of 16 months as a Referee Consultant to the Latvia FF.

He has extensive experience in refereeing, observing/assessing, instructing, mentoring & coaching all levels of match officials, and has participated for numerous seminars and development projects.

Snoddy was appointed Member of the Order of the British Empire (MBE) in the 2020 Birthday Honours for services to association football.

== Personal life ==
Snoddy was one of four sons of the art historian Theo Snoddy and his wife Anna (Betty). He married wife Elaine on the 3rd of July 1976, and has three children, Philip, Graham and Victoria.

His younger brother Stephen is a Rugby Union referee for Manchester & District Rugby Union Referees.
