= All Ireland Schoolboys Hockey Championship =

The logo of the Irish Hockey Association.

The All Ireland Schoolboys Hockey Championship is an annual competition involving the strongest schools affiliated to Hockey Ireland. The competition is held in the Autumn term of each school year and 16 teams across the island compete.

Wesley College, Dublin, are the current champions, having defeated The High School 3-0 in the 2025 final at Villiers School, Limerick

== Venues ==
The venue of the competition is on a three-year rota between Munster, Leinster and Ulster

== History ==
The competition began in the 1982 school year. It was initially dominated by schools from Ulster, with the first fourteen winners coming from that province. The monopoly was finally broken in 1996-97 15th tournament, when Newpark School from Dublin became the first winners from Leinster. Ashton were the first school from Munster to win the All Ireland tournament. In 2019 all four semifinalists hailed from Leinster, with eventual winners, The High School, defeating King's Hospital 1-0 to reach their first ever final. The same scoreline stood in the other semi, where Wesley College were beaten by tournament runners-up St. Andrew's College.

== Format ==
Sixteen teams compete in the finals. The teams are drawn into four pools with four teams each. Each team plays the other three teams in their group once. Each group winner then play one of the other group winners in a semi-final match. The two semi-final winners then play each other in the final. The winner of the final is presented with the Tasmanian Shield. The four 2nd ranked teams in the Pools qualify to compete for the subsidiary trophy, the Herbie Sharman Trophy.

== Performance table ==
School	Winners	Runner-up	Total Finals	Year of last win
Banbridge Academy	7	6	13	2024
Royal Belfast Academical Institution	7	5	12	2013-14
St. Andrew's College, Dublin	7	2	9	2017-18
Wesley College, Dublin	4	10	14	2025
Newry High School	3	0	3	1984-85
Wallace High School, Lisburn	2	5	7	1987-88
Bandon Grammar School	2	3	5	2021-22
Ashton School, Cork	2	2	4	2000-01
Bangor Grammar School	2	0	2	1997-98
Cookstown High School	1	2	3	2007-08
Methodist College Belfast	1	2	3	1985-86
Newpark Comprehensive School	1	1	2	1996-97
Newtown School, Waterford	1	1	2	2018
The High School, Dublin	1	2	3	2019
Kilkenny College	1	0	1	1999-00
Wellington College Belfast	1	0	1	1993-94
Friends School Lisburn	0	2	2	

== Finals ==
=== 1982-1988 ===
Year	Venue	Winner	Runner-up	Notes
1982	Bangor	Newry High School	Banbridge Academy	
1983	Dublin	Newry High School	Wallace High School, Lisburn	
1984	Cork	Newry High School	Wallace High School, Lisburn	
1985	Cookstown	Methodist College Belfast	Wallace High School, Lisburn	
1986	Kilkenny	Royal Belfast Academical Institution	Bandon Grammar School	
1987	Limerick	Wallace High School, Lisburn	Methodist College Belfast	
1988	Lisburn	Royal Belfast Academical Institution	Banbridge Academy	

=== 1989-1998 ===
Year	Venue	Winner	Runner-up	Notes
1989	Dublin	Bangor Grammar School	Royal Belfast Academical Institution	
1990	Waterford	Royal Belfast Academical Institution	Newpark Comprehensive School	
1991	Cookstown	Royal Belfast Academical Institution	Wesley College, Dublin	
1992	Dublin	Banbridge Academy	Royal Belfast Academical Institution	
1993	Cork	Wellington College Belfast	Friends School Lisburn	
1994	Belfast	Royal Belfast Academical Institution	Cookstown High School	
1995	Dublin	Royal Belfast Academical Institution	Methodist College Belfast	
1996	Cork	Newpark Comprehensive School	Wesley College, Dublin	
1997	Bangor	Bangor Grammar School	Ashton School	
1998	Dublin	Ashton School	Wesley College, Dublin	

=== 1999-2008 ===
Year	Venue	Winner			Runner-up	Notes
1999	Cork	Kilkenny College			Ashton School	penalty strokes
2000	Bangor	Ashton School			Wesley College, Dublin	
2001	Dublin	St. Andrew's College, Dublin	1	0	Wesley College Dublin	
2002	Cork	Wesley College, Dublin			Royal Belfast Academical Institution	
2003	Banbridge	Royal Belfast Academical Institution			Bandon Grammar School	
2004	Dublin	Wesley College, Dublin			Bandon Grammar School	
2005	Cork	Bandon Grammar School	4	3	Royal Belfast Academical Institution	extra time
2006	Belfast	Banbridge Academy	5	4	Royal Belfast Academical Institution	extra time - golden goal
2007	Dublin	Cookstown High School	4	2	Banbridge Academy	
2008	Limerick	St. Andrew's College, Dublin	2	1	Wesley College, Dublin	

=== 2009- ===
Year	Venue	Winner			Runner-up	Notes
2009	Belfast	Wesley College, Dublin	3	2	Wallace High School, Lisburn	Extra time - Silver goal
2010	Dublin	Banbridge Academy	4	2	St. Andrew's College, Dublin	
2011	Cork	Banbridge Academy	2	1	Cookstown High School	
2012	Belfast	St. Andrew's College, Dublin	3	1	Wesley College, Dublin	
2013	Dublin	St. Andrew's College, Dublin	6	1	Wesley College, Dublin	
2014	Cork	St. Andrew's College, Dublin	3	1	Wallace High School, Lisburn	
2015	Belfast	Banbridge Academy	3	2	Wesley College, Dublin	
2016	Dublin	St. Andrew's College, Dublin	3	2	Banbridge Academy	
2017	Cork	St. Andrew's College, Dublin	1 (4)	1 (1)	Wesley College, Dublin	Penalty Strokes
2018	Belfast	Newtown School Waterford	1	0	Banbridge Academy	
2019	Dublin	The High School, Dublin	2 (7)	2 (6)	St. Andrew's College, Dublin	Penalty Strokes

=== 2020- ===
Year	Venue	Winner			Runner-up	Notes
2020	Belfast	No Competition	0	0	No Competition	
2021	Dublin	Bandon Grammar School	2 (3)	2 (1)	Banbridge Academy	Shuttles
2022	Cork	Banbridge Academy	2 (3)	2 (1)	The High School	Shuttles
2023	Banbridge	Wallace High School, Lisburn	1 (4)	1 (3)	Newtown School	Shuttles
2024	Dublin	Banbridge Academy	1	0	Friends School Lisburn	
2025	Limerick	Wesley College, Dublin	3	0	The High School	
