= Theo Snoddy =

Irish art historian

- Born: 30 November 1922; Lurgan, County Armagh
- Died: 12 June 2008 (aged 85); Finaghy, County Antrim
- Burial place: Friends Burial Ground, Balmoral, Belfast
- Known for: Art historian & journalist

Theo Snoddy (30 November 1922 - 12 June 2008) was a Northern Irish art historian and author of the Dictionary of Irish Artists: 20th century.

Theodore John Snoddy was born in Lurgan, County Armagh in 1922. He was the son of a shipyard worker John Snoddy and his wife Emily Sinton. Snoddy was one of three children. He was educated at Cooke Elementary Primary School and later at Friends' School, Lisburn. Snoddy's interest in art stemmed from frequent childhood visits to the Belfast Museum and Art Gallery.

Snoddy joined the staff at the News Letter in 1937, where he was to work until 1987. For thirty years Snoddy was the art critic at the newspaper where he wrote on exhibitions north and south of the border. He was also the paper's hockey correspondent throughout the 1960s and 1970s. Snoddy co-founded and played for the Friends' School Old Boys hockey club who had some success in the 1960s and 1970s. Snoddy was a Quaker and was for a time a Chair of the Board of Governor's at Friends' School. Snoddy also had a keen interest in bowls and was the founding editor and publisher of The Ulster Bowler in 1946.

In 1951, the year he met his wife, he travelled pillion on a motorcycle adventure across Europe. In 1954 Snoddy married Anna Elizabeth Magowan. Snoddy was a lifelong member of the Linen Hall Library in Belfast. For decades Snoddy researched and wrote the Dictionary of Irish Artists: 20th century, the natural successor to Walter Strickland's celebrated 1913 tome A Dictionary of Irish Artists. Snoddy's dictionary was first published in 1996 with a revised edition including a further one hundred artists following in 2002. The publication only included entries related to deceased artists and was met with widespread acclaim. Snoddy compiled the dictionary from painstaking research in art libraries, archives and from some 2500 letters received from artists and members of the public. Snoddy's work was initially funded by the Irish University Press until they went into liquidation. Subsequently he attracted a small grant from the Arts Council of Ireland and an Arts Council for Northern Ireland award of £250 for expenses, in 1976. In the following year Snoddy contributed monographs to John Hewitt's Art in Ulster 1 and Mike Catto's Art in Ulster 2.

For sixteen years between 1988 and 2004, Snoddy acted as an adviser to Ulster Television where along with Mike McCann he built an important collection of Irish art for the company. The large collection included work by Basil Blackshaw, Carolyn Mulholland, Rita Duffy, Dennis H Osborne, and Neil Shawcross, and has been widely exhibited throughout Ireland.

Theo Snoddy died on 12 June 2008 aged 85. He was survived by his wife Betty, four sons and a daughter. Son Alan Snoddy MBE has worked in the football industry as a referee and advisor for over 50 years. Stephen Snoddy is an artist and Director of The New Art Gallery, Walsall. His remains were interred at Friends Burial Ground, Balmoral, following a service at the Quaker Meeting House in South Belfast. In 2009 James Adam's Auctioneers in association with Bonham's sold part of Snoddy's personal art collection including works by Jack Butler Yeats, Markey Robinson and George Campbell.
