= Kids' Lit Quiz =

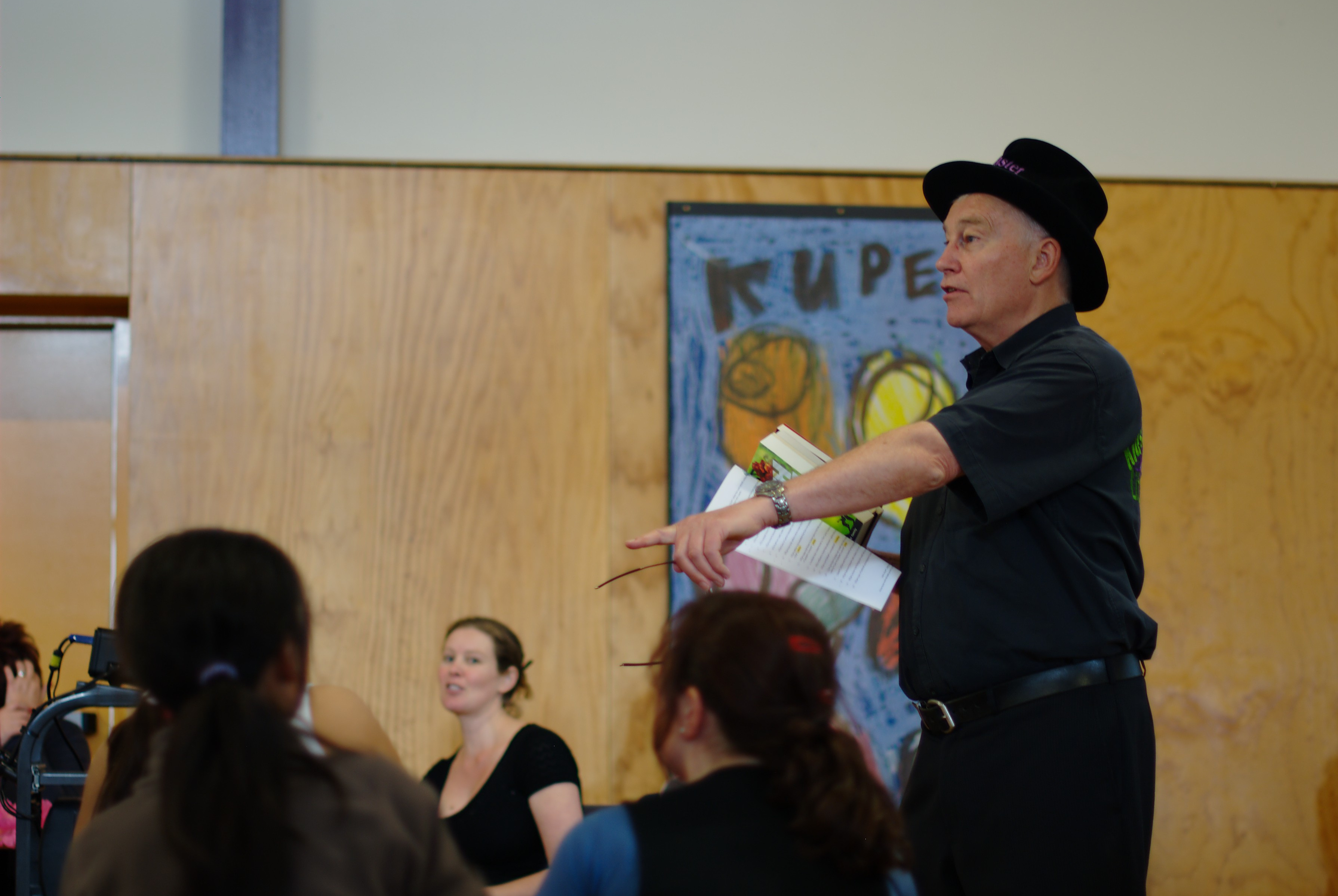
Wayne Mills awards the points in a sudden-death playoff during the Wellington Region Kids' Lit Quiz in 2010

The Kids' Lit Quiz is an annual literature competition, in which teams of four students, aged 10 to 14, work together to answer wide-ranging literary questions. The winning team from each region competes in the national final. The winner of the national final is then invited to the World Final held annually in July or August. Since its inception in 1991, thousands of students have participated each year throughout the world.

== History ==
The quiz was founded in 1991 by Wayne Mills in New Zealand a former senior lecturer at the University of Auckland, who wears a purple and black hat while hosting the literary quiz.

It was created following his observation when his children were teenagers that young readers were rarely recognized in school prize-givings. The competition was created to acknowledge and motivate children aged 11 to 13, a stage in adolescence where engagement with reading often dipped.

Wayne is joined by his wife, Pa Mills, who was born in Chiang Rai, Thailand, and assists in running the quiz internationally. Her responsibilities include preparing quiz sheets, collecting answers for marking, organizing teams during competitions, distributing prizes, and attending to the welfare of participants at international events.

In 2008 Wayne Mills was given the Storylines Margaret Mahy Medal and Lecture Award to recognize his achievement in establishing the Kids' Lit Quiz. He was made a Member of the New Zealand Order of Merit in the Queen's New Year's Honours in 2011 for meritorious services to education, specifically children's literature. In August 2018 he was granted Life Membership of Storylines Children's Literature Trust and Foundation.

Currently, the quiz takes place in Australia, Canada, Indonesia, New Zealand, South Africa, Thailand, and the USA. Hong Kong was part of it from 2013 to 2019 and are set to return in 2026.

There are three countries who were previously involved with the quiz but no longer take part in it. Singapore, the first country in Asia to join the quiz, participated from 2014 to 2019. Nigeria participated in 2019 and 2020. The United Kingdom participated from 2003 to 2020, and at its peak had over 400 schools participating in the heat The UK competition was resurrected in April 2026. The winning School was Arden Academy in Solihull but was unable to attend the World Final

== Structure ==
=== Heats/regionals ===
Heats take place regionally in individual countries, with the top few teams from each region progressing to the national finals.

=== National finals ===
National finals comprise the top teams from the country.

=== World Finals ===
One team represents each country in the World Finals.

== World Finals ==
Results
Year	Date	Location	Champion	Second place	Third place
2004	20 June	Auckland, New Zealand	Dunblane High School (United Kingdom)		
2005	11 June	Auckland, New Zealand	St Margaret's College (New Zealand)		
2006	18 June	Auckland, New Zealand	St Margaret's College, Christchurch (New Zealand)		
2007	9 July	Oxford, UK	Wellington College, Belfast (United Kingdom)		
2008	10 July	Oxford Playhouse, Oxford, UK	Arnold House School, London (United Kingdom)		
2009	3 August	Constitutional Court of South Africa, Johannesburg, South Africa	Bancroft's School, Woodford Green (United Kingdom)	Belmont Intermediate (New Zealand)	Grove Town (South Africa)
2010	14 August	Stewart's Melville College, Edinburgh, UK	City of London School for Girls (United Kingdom)	Mary Erskine School (Scotland)	Belmont Intermediate School, Auckland (New Zealand)
2011	19 July	Southwell School, Hamilton, New Zealand	Manor Gardens Primary School (South Africa)	Summit Heights, Toronto (Canada)	Cockermouth School (United Kingdom)
2012	4 July	University of Auckland, New Zealand	Awakeri Primary School (New Zealand)	Roedean School (South Africa)	University of Toronto Schools (Canada)
2013	3 July	Durban, South Africa	Roedean School (South Africa)	Takapuna Normal Intermediate (New Zealand)	University of Toronto Schools (Canada)
2014	8 July	Princess Pavilion, Falmouth, Cornwall, England	City of London School for Girls (United Kingdom)	Canberra Grammar School (Australia)	Awakeri Primary School (New Zealand)
2015	8 July	Central Connecticut State University, USA	Southwell School (New Zealand)	Manor Gardens (South Africa)	Sedgwick School (USA)
2016	19 August	Aotea Centre, Auckland, New Zealand	Wellesley College (New Zealand)	Hamilton College (United Kingdom)	Kinross Wolaroi School (Australia)
2017	3 July	Oakville Centre for the Performing Arts, Ontario, Canada	St John's College (South Africa)	Woodrow Wilson (USA)	Kingston Grammar (UK)
2018	4 July	St Kentigern Boys' School, Auckland, New Zealand	Canberra Grammar School (Australia)	Raffles Girls' School (Singapore)	Oxford High School (United Kingdom)
2019	12 July	School of the Arts, Singapore	Churchill Road Elementary School (USA)	Palmerston North Normal Intermediate School (New Zealand)	St John's College (South Africa)
2020–2022	Not held due to COVID-19 pandemic				
2023	22 July	Havelock North Intermediate School, New Zealand	Macquarie College (Australia)	Waimea Intermediate (New Zealand)	ACS Jakarta (Indonesia)
2024	10 July	Canberra Grammar School, Australia	ACS Jakarta (Indonesia)	Canberra Grammar School (Australia)	St John's College (South Africa)
2025	13 August	St. John's College, Johannesburg	The King's School Tudor House (Australia)	St. Mary's School (South Africa)	Nysmith School, Virginia (USA)

The 2004 World Final was held on 20 June in Auckland, New Zealand. The winner was Dunblane High School, Scotland (UK).

The 2005 World Final was held 11 June in Auckland, New Zealand, and was won by St Margaret's College, Christchurch (NZ).

The 2006 World Final was held 18 June in Auckland, NZ and the winner was St Margaret's College, Christchurch (NZ), who also won the 2005 Final.

The 2007 World Final was held on 9 July in Oxford, and the winner was Wellington College, Belfast (UK).

The 2008 World Final was held on 10 July at the Oxford Playhouse in Oxford. The winner was Arnold House School, London (UK).

The 2009 World Final was held on 3 August at the Constitutional Court of South Africa, in Johannesburg. The winner was Bancroft's School, Woodford Green (UK). The second-place team, from Belmont Intermediate (New Zealand), notably included singer-songwriter Lorde. Grove Town (South Africa) came in third place.

The 2010 World Final was held on 14 August in the Performing Arts Centre at Stewart's Melville College in Edinburgh. The winner was the City of London School for Girls (UK).

The 2011 World Final was held on 19 July at Southwell School in Hamilton, New Zealand. The winner was Manor Gardens Primary School, Durban (South Africa).

The 2012 World Final was held on 4 July at the University of Auckland, New Zealand. The winner was Awakeri Primary School, Bay of Plenty (New Zealand).

The 2013 World Final was held in Durban, South Africa. The winner was Roedean School, Johannesburg (South Africa).

The 2014 World Final was held in the Princess Pavilion, Falmouth, Cornwall, England. The winner was City of London School for Girls (UK).

The 2015 World Final was held on 8 July at the Central Connecticut State University, USA. The winner was Southwell School, Hamilton (New Zealand).

The 2016 World Final was held at the Aotea Centre, Auckland, New Zealand. The winner was Wellesley College (New Zealand).

The 2017 World Final was held at the Oakville Centre for the Performing Arts, Ontario, Canada. The winner was St John's College, Johannesburg (South Africa).

The 2018 World Final was held at St Kentigern Boys' School, Remuera, Auckland, New Zealand. The winner was Canberra Grammar School (Australia).

The 2019 World Final was held at Sota School of the Arts in Singapore. The winner was Churchill Road Elementary School from the United States of America, with New Zealand and South Africa taking 2nd and 3rd.

The 2020 World Final was to be held in Hamilton, New Zealand, but was cancelled due to COVID-19. The 2021 and 2022 World Finals were also cancelled.

In 2023, a financially constrained World Final was held at Havelock North Intermediate School. The guest speaker was the Honourable Jan Tinnetti, who at the time was the 48th Minister of Education. The Final was won by Macquarie College from Australia. Unexpectedly in September of the same year, Kids' Lit Quiz Patron, Chloe Wright ONZM, passed away.

In 2024, the quiz expanded after recovering from the Covid pandemic and an inaugural World Final was held in Australia. It was hosted by Canberra Grammar School, who won the 2018 World Final. The World Final was won by an Asian nation for the first time, Indonesia. The winning school was ACS Jakarta.

The 2025 edition was held on the 13th of August, hosted by St. John's College, Johannesburg, a long-time participant of the quiz (winner of the 2017 World Final and placed in the top 3 multiple times). The winning team came from The King's School Tudor House, Australia. St. Mary's School (South Africa) came second, and Nysmith School (USA) came in third. Author of South African book series Spud, John van de Ruit, spoke at the competition.

The 2026 World Final was held on 10 July (a public holiday celebrating the Māori New Year known as Matariki). The location was in the beautiful Bay of Islands, a historically important part of New Zealand. First was King Philip School, West Hartford, Connecticut, Second was Heaton Normal Intermediate, Christchurch NZ, and Third was Sha Tin College Hong Kong.
