= Davy Portrait Award =

The Davy Portrait Awards were set up in 2008 with the aim of celebrating the exacting art of portraiture and the Irish artists who practise it. It is open to artists based in Northern Ireland and the Republic of Ireland working in traditional and non-digital media. In addition Irish artists based outside Ireland are also eligible to apply. The best entries are exhibited at the Naughton Gallery in Belfast, and at Farmleigh House in Dublin. The awards offer a first prize of £10,000 or €11,500. Currently the awards appear to be held on a biennial basis.

The awards take their name from the primary sponsor, Davy, a Dublin-based stockbroking, wealth management and financial advisory company. The awards are also supported by Arts & Business who help business people to support the arts.

== Past winners ==
- 2008 - Joe Dunne
- 2009 - No award
- 2010 - Ian Cumberland
