= David Logan (chemist) =

David Edwin Logan (born 27 August 1956) is a Northern Irish chemist, and has been Coulson Professor of Theoretical Chemistry at the University of Oxford since 2005.

== Early life ==
He went to Gilnahirk Primary School in east Belfast. He attended the grammar school Sullivan Upper School in Holywood, County Down.

Originally reading Philosophy at Trinity College, Cambridge he quickly changed to the Natural Science Tripos, gaining a BA in 1978, and a PhD in 1982 in Theoretical Chemistry. From 1982-86 he was a Junior Research Fellow at Christ's College, Cambridge.

== Career ==
=== University of Oxford ===
From 1986 he worked at the University of Oxford. From 1986-2005 he was Waters Fellow at Balliol College, Oxford. From 1996-2005 he had the Title of Distinction of professor of chemistry. In 1996 he spent time at the Theory Division of the Institut Laue–Langevin in Grenoble.

From the Royal Society of Chemistry he was awarded the Marlow Medal and Prize in 1990.

He is based in the Physical and Theoretical Chemistry Laboratory on South Parks Road in Oxford and is responsible for the Theoretical Chemistry Group.

He is a professorial fellow of University College, Oxford.

Academic offices
Preceded by Mark Child	Coulson Professor of Theoretical Chemistry; 2005 –	Succeeded by Incumbent
