= Thomas Martin (cricketer) =

Irish cricketer

Personal information
- Full name: Thomas Martin
- Born: 15 January 1911; Lisburn, Ireland
- Died: 7 December 1937 (aged 26); Lisburn, Northern Ireland
- Batting: Right-handed
- Bowling: Right-arm fast-medium
- Relatives: Herbie Martin (brother)

Domestic team information
- Years: Team
- 1934: Ireland

Career statistics
Competition	First-class
Matches	1
Runs scored	7
Batting average	7.00
100s/50s	–/–
Top score	7
Balls bowled	108
Wickets	0
Bowling average	–
5 wickets in innings	–
10 wickets in match	–
Best bowling	–
Catches/stumpings	–/–
- Source: Cricinfo, 3 November 2018

Thomas Martin (15 January 1911 – 7 December 1937) was an Irish first-class cricketer.

Martin was born in Lisburn in January 1911, where he was educated at Lisburn Intermediate School. (Which is now The Wallace High School) After leaving secondary education, Martin went up to Queen's University Belfast. Playing his club cricket for Lisburn, as one of "Awty's Boys", a group of young cricketers coached by the Staffordshire minor counties cricketer Joe Awty. His move to Belfast saw him play his club cricket for Queen's University. A tall man, standing over six feet tall, Martin used his height to his advantage as a fast-medium bowler, able to extract good bounce and move the ball both ways. His debut for Ireland came in a minor match against Sir J Cahn's XI at Belfast in 1930. His next appearance for Ireland came in July 1934, again in a minor match, this time against the Marylebone Cricket Club (MCC) at Strabane. Later in August 1934, Martin made his only appearance in first-class cricket for Ireland against the MCC at Dublin. As a bowler, he bowled 18 wicket-less overs in the match, which conceded 49 runs. Batting from the tail, Martin ended Ireland's first-innings unbeaten without scoring, while in their second innings he was dismissed without scoring by Reginald Butterworth. Outside of cricket, Martin was a schoolteacher. However, he was afflicted with tuberculosis and fought a long battle against the illness, succumbing to it in December 1937. His brother, Herbie, was also a first-class cricketer, in addition to playing rugby union.
