= Florence Fulton Hobson =

Irish architect

Florence Fulton Hobson (11 February 1881 – 1 November 1978) was an Irish architect, the first woman in Ireland to gain accreditation from the Royal Institute of British Architects (RIBA).

The daughter of Benjamin Hobson, a grocer, and Mary Anne Bulmer, a campaigner for women's rights and amateur archaeologist, she was born in Monasterevin and grew up in Belfast. She and her family were Quakers. She attended Friends' School, Lisburn. Later, she studied at the Belfast School of Art with James John Phillips and James St John Phillips. A suffragette Quaker woman, Hobson's mother helped her daughter architectural practice where she could take an apprenticeship, a difficult task given the conflicting opinion of women in architecture in the time. She passed her preliminary examination with the Royal Institute of British Architects (RIBA) in 1899. Architect W. Hilton Nash (1850-1927) initiated a petition against her election and once she was approved he led efforts to overturn the decision. These efforts led to a vote the confirmed her election by a single vote. Hobson moved to London, where she worked in the office of Guy Dawber and then with James Glen Sivewright Gibson from 1903 to 1904. Despite Gibson being pleased with her work, Hobson was unable to find work and returned to London. She there became part of the architectural staff of Belfast Corporation in 1905. She was elected a licentiate of the RBA in 1911. While working as an assistant to the Royal Commission on Health and Housing, she travelled to Germany and Switzerland to study housing issues in those countries. She later worked on the Reconstruction Commission of the Irish White Cross. Hobson retired in 1937.

In 1948, she married William Forbes Patterson. The couple first lived in Crawfordsburn but is known to have been living in London during the period from 1957 to 1965. She later returned to Crawfordsburn, where she died at the age of 97.

Her brother John Bulmer Hobson was an Irish nationalist.
