= Joe Dunne (artist) =

Irish artist (born 1957)

Born in Dublin in 1957, Joe Dunne is an artist based in Dublin, Ireland. After graduating from NCAD in 1978 he worked as a painter, illustrator and designer before focusing on painting. He is known principally for his portraits, landscapes and still life paintings, executed in a wide variety of media (oil, tempera and watercolour). He has received a number of awards, most recently a first prize in the inaugural Davy Portrait Awards 2008 and the AXA Insurance Drawing Prize in 2009.

Commissions have included portraits of former Taoiseach Éamon de Valera and President Mary McAleese. Joe Dunne is a member of the Royal Hibernian Academy.
