= Violet McBride =

Great Britain and Ireland women's hockey player

Personal information
- Born: 16 October 1954 (age 71) Kilkeel, County Down; Northern Ireland
- Height: 160 cm (5 ft 3 in)
- Weight: 55 kg (121 lb)

Sport
- Sport: Field hockey
- Position: Midfielder/Centre half
Youth career
- Years: Team
- 196x–197x: Kilkeel High School
Senior career
Years	Team	Caps	Goals
197x–19xx	Portadown	-	-
197x–19xx	→ Ulster	-	-
200x–201x	Pegasus	-	-
National team
Years	Team	Caps	Goals
197x–198x	Ireland	38	-
198x–198x	Great Britain	64	-

Violet McBride MBE (born 16 October 1954) is a former women's field hockey player from Northern Ireland who represented both Ireland and Great Britain at international level. She represented Great Britain at the 1988 Summer Olympics. In 1989 she was awarded the MBE. In 2011 she was inducted into the Irish Hockey Association Hall of Fame. McBride is also a former drum major World champion, winning the title in both 1980 and 1982. McBride has also represented Ireland as a senior ladies golfer.

== Early years, family and education ==
McBride was raised in Kilkeel, County Down. She is the daughter of Henry and Dorothy McBride. She has two brothers, Alan and Harry. She was educated at Kilkeel High School.

== Domestic teams ==
While attending Kilkeel High School, McBride played field hockey on Saturday mornings for the school and for Portadown Ladies in the afternoon. She also represented Ulster at interprovincial level. In 2001–02 McBride played for the first official Pegasus veterans team and finished the season as player of the year.

== International ==
=== Ireland ===
McBride made 38 senior appearances for Ireland. In 1981, along with Jenny Givan, she was banned from playing for Ireland for six years by the Irish Ladies Hockey Union after opting to play for Great Britain. In 2011 McBride was inducted into the Irish Hockey Association Hall of Fame.

=== Great Britain ===
McBride made 64 senior appearances for Great Britain. While playing for Great Britain, she was named the team's Player of the Year for 1987. She represented Great Britain at the 1988 Summer Olympics and captained the team in the bronze medal match against the Netherlands.

Tournaments	Place	Team
1987 Women's Hockey Champions Trophy	5th	Great Britain
1988 Summer Olympics	4th	Great Britain

== Drum major ==
McBride is also a former drum major World champion, winning the title in both 1980 and 1982. She was the first ever woman to win the title. She has also won Ulster, All-Ireland, British, European, Cowal and Scottish championships. Her brother, Alan, was also a Drum major World champion, winning five titles in 1985, 1991, 1995, 1997 and 1999.

== Golf ==
McBride has also represented Ireland as a senior ladies golfer. She plays for Belvoir Park Golf Club. She is also a lifetime honorary member at her local club in Kilkeel.
