= Robert Moore (Irish cricketer) =

Irish cricketer

Personal information
- Full name: Robert William Moore
- Born: 15 August 1905; Brookland, Washington, D.C., United States
- Died: 27 October 1945 (aged 40); Rochdale, Lancashire, England
- Batting: Right-handed
- Bowling: Slow left-arm orthodox

Domestic team information
- Years: Team
- 1926: Ireland

Career statistics
Competition	First-class
Matches	2
Runs scored	51
Batting average	17.00
100s/50s	–/–
Top score	24
Balls bowled	0
Wickets	–
Bowling average	–
5 wickets in innings	–
10 wickets in match	–
Best bowling	–
Catches/stumpings	–/–
- Source: Cricinfo, 7 November 2018

Robert William Moore (15 August 1905 – 27 October 1945) was an Irish first-class cricketer.

Moore was born in the United States at Brookland, Washington, D.C. Moving to Ireland during his childhood, he was educated at Friends' School, Lisburn. He played his club cricket in Belfast for Cliftonville from 1922. Moore toured England and Wales with Ireland in June 1926, making his debut in first-class cricket on the tour against Oxford University at Oxford. Weeks later he played a second first-class match against Wales at Belfast. He scored 51 runs in these two matches, with a highest score of 22. Moore played club cricket for Cliftonville until 1934, after which he moved to Derry, where he played for City of Derry. He later played a minor match for Ireland against the Marylebone Cricket Club at Strabane in 1934. He later moved to England, where he died at Rochdale in October 1945.
