= Ian Cumberland =

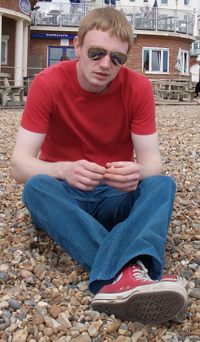
Ian Cumberland

Ian Cumberland is an Irish visual artist. He was born in Banbridge, Co. Down, 1983. His work focuses on portraits with his paintings typically using oils as the primary media. He studied fine art at the University of Ulster. He has won several prizes, the most significant of which was the Davy Portrait Award in 2010. In 2019 and 2020 Cumberland deals in his work with increased commercialization, technological development and its effects on the individual. In doing so, he creates scenes that seem like a private snapshot and transport the viewer into a voyeuristic experience. He develops these by integrating his paintings into an installation consisting of audio and video works, neon light, sculptures and other plastic materials. Through this kind of deconstruction of his created sceneries he achieves a visual construction that alienates the human being within his culture, the influence of the mass media and data surveillance.

In 2011 he won third place overall in the BP Portrait Award from a field of 2400 entries.

== Prizes ==
- BP Portrait Award, 3rd place, 2011
- KPMG Emerging Artist Award, Royal Ulster Academy, 2010
- Davy Portrait Award, 2010
- KPMG Emerging Artist Award, Royal Ulster Academy, 2009
- Selectors Choice Award, Art Society of Ulster, 2006
- John and Rachael Turner Award, University of Ulster, 2006

== Solo exhibitions ==
- 2020 "Presence in Absence", JD Malat Gallery, London, UK
- 2019 "A Common Fiction/Once removed", Josef Filipp Gallery, Leipzig, Germany
- 2018 "A Common Fiction", Golden Thread Gallery, Belfast, Northern Ireland
- 2012 Albemarle Gallery, London, UK
- 2008 Albemarle Gallery, London, UK

== Selected group exhibitions ==
- 2020 "The Contemporary Human Condition", JD Malat Gallery, London, UK
- 2019 "I’ll be your mirror", Josef Filipp Gallery, Leipzig, Germany
- 2018 "A Brand New Darkness", Abridged, Galway Arts Centre, Ireland
- 2017 "Delusional", Jonathan Levine Projects, New Jersey, USA
- 2016 "Portraits of a Nation", Farmleigh Gallery, Dublin, Ireland
- 2015 "BP Portrait Award" (Touring Exhibition), The National Portrait Gallery, London, Scottish National Portrait Gallery, Edinburgh, Ulster Museum, Belfast, UK
- 2014 "Presently", MCAC, Portadown, Northern Ireland
- 2013 "Precious Cargo", The London Street Gallery, Derry, Northern Ireland
- 2012 "182nd Annual Exhibition", The Royal Hibernian Academy, Dublin, Ireland
- 2011 BP Portrait Award, The National Portrait Gallery, London
- 2011 Wolverhampton Art Gallery, Wolverhampton
- 2011–2012 Aberdeen Art Gallery, Aberdeen
- 2010 Davy Portrait Award, Farmleigh Gallery, Dublin
- 2010 Naughton Gallery, Belfast
- 2009 BP Portrait Award, The National Portrait Gallery, London
- 2009 Dean Gallery of the National Galleries of Scotland, Edinburgh
