= Errol Hastings =

- Born: Errol Lewis Hastings; 9 July 1994 (age 31); Belfast, Northern Ireland
- Culinary career
- Cooking style: Baking

Errol Lewis Hastings (born in 1994) is a Northern Irish baker from Northern Ireland, best known for being Chief Artisan Baker of Sainsbury's since 2014.

He has worked as a baker since taking up the career as a teenager with an apprenticeship at Ashers Baking Company and has gone on to become head baker at a number of Sainsbury's stores around Britain. After returning from working in London, Hastings began creating recipes as Chief Artisan Baker at Sainsbury's.
