= Bill O'Hara (sailor) =

Irish sailor

Personal information
- Nationality: Irish
- Born: 28 November 1958 (age 66); Belfast, Northern Ireland

Sport
- Sport: Sailing

William Patrick Thomas O'Hara OBE (born 28 November 1958) is an Irish sailor from Northern Ireland. He competed at the 1984 Summer Olympics and the 1988 Summer Olympics.

O'Hara was appointed Officer of the Order of the British Empire (OBE) in the 2021 New Year Honours for services to sailing.
