= Burney Cup =

Irish school hockey competition

- Sport: Field hockey
- Founded: 1920
- No. of teams: 19 (season 2013-14)
- Most recent champion: Banbridge Academy
- Most titles: Friends' School Lisburn; 16 outright and 4 shared
- Website: Ulster Hockey Burney Cup

Notes
- Winners qualify for the All Ireland John Waring Schoolboys Championship

The Burney Cup (Ulster Schoolboys' Senior Hockey Cup) is an annual competition involving the strongest schools affiliated to the Ulster Branch of the Irish Hockey Association. The competition is held in the spring term of each school year and progress through to the final is via an open draw.

The most successful school is Friends' School Lisburn with 20 wins (16 outright wins and 4 shared wins).

The current holder is Banbridge Academy.

== Eligibility ==
To play in the competition, boys must be 19 years of age and under on 1 April immediately preceding the draw. The draw for the Cup takes places in early January. A fresh draw to determine pairings is held prior to each subsequent round.

== History ==
The trophy was presented by Andrew George Burney of East Antrim Hockey Club.

The first final took place on 22 April 1920 at the Ormeau Road grounds of North of Ireland Rugby & Cricket Club. The final was marked by future Irish rugby union and cricket international A.C. Douglas of Royal Belfast Academical Institution scoring all six goals in his team's victory.

== Performance table ==
(one finalist missing)

Performance Table
School	Wins	Shared	Beaten Finalists	Total Finals	Last Title
Wallace High School	19	0	6	25	2023
Friends School Lisburn	16	5	9	30	2018
Banbridge Academy	15	0	16	31	2026
Royal Belfast Academical Institution	14	3	5	23	2024
Cookstown High School	14	1	6	21	2009
Ballycastle High School	9	1	4	14	1964
Newry High School	6	0	9	15	1984
Methodist College Belfast	2	0	4	6	1999
Campbell College	2	0	4	6	1986
Belfast Royal Academy	2	0	1	3	1922
Ballyclare High School	2	0	0	2	1935
Banbridge Technical School	2	0	0	2	1924
Sullivan Upper School	2	1	4	7	2017
Bushmills Grammar School	1	1	5	7	1962
Bangor Grammar School	1	0	8	9	1983
Shaftesbury House	1	0	1	2	1927
Kilkeel High School	0	0	2	2	NA
Cavan Royal School	0	0	2	2	NA
Royal & Prior School, Raphoe	0	0	2	2	NA
Omagh Academy	0	0	1	1	NA
Strabane Grammar School	0	0	1	1	NA

== Finals ==
(records incomplete)

=== 1920s ===
Year	Winner			Runner-up	Notes
1920	Royal Belfast Academical Institution	6	1	Belfast Royal Academy	
1921	Belfast Royal Academy				
1922	Belfast Royal Academy	1	0	Cavan Royal School	
1923	Banbridge Technical School	3	2	Cavan Royal School	
1924	Banbridge Technical School	3	1	Methodist College	
1925	Ballycastle High School	2	0	Friends School Lisburn	
1926	Ballycastle High School	2	1	Shaftesbury House	after extra time
1927	Shaftesbury House	2	0	Ballycastle High School	
1928	Ballycastle High School	3	0	Friends School Lisburn	Replay - Game 1: 1-1
1929	Banbridge Academy			Ballycastle High School	Replay - Game 1: 2-2

=== 1930s ===
Year	Winner			Runner-up	Notes
1930	Ballycastle High School	2	1	Banbridge Academy	
1931	Ballyclare Intermediate School^{a}	1	0	Lisburn Intermediate School^{b}	
1932	Banbridge Academy	4	3	Ballycastle High School	after extra time
1933	Ballycastle High School	2	0	Banbridge Academy	
1934	Ballycastle High School	4	3	Newry Intermediate School^{c}	after extra time
1935	Ballyclare Intermediate School^{a}	2	1	Banbridge Academy	
1936	Newry Intermediate School^{c}			Lisburn Intermediate School^{b}	Replay - Game 1: 1-1
1937	Ballycastle High School	2	0	Newry Intermediate School^{c}	
1938	Ballycastle High School	1	0	Banbridge Academy	
1939	Banbridge Academy	1	0	Friends School Lisburn	Replay - Game 1: 2-2

=== 1940s ===
Year	Winner			Runner-up	Notes
1940	Friends School Lisburn	3	2	Banbridge Academy	AET in replay, Game 1: 1-1 2 x ET
1941					
1942					
1943					
1944	Friends School Lisburn	4	0	Bushmills Grammar School	
1945	Banbridge Academy	5	2	Friends School Lisburn	Replay - Game 1: 1-1
1946	Friends School Lisburn	4	0	Omagh Academy	
1947	Friends School Lisburn	1	0	Newry Intermediate School^{c}	After extra time in replay, Game 1: 1-1
1948	Newry Intermediate School^{c}	1	0	Friends School Lisburn	
1949	Friends School Lisburn	1	0	Methodist College	

=== 1950s ===
Year	Winner			Runner-up	Notes
1950	Newry Grammar School	2	1	Bushmills Grammar School	
1951	Bushmills Grammar School	3	0	Cookstown High School	
1952	Friends School Lisburn	2	1	Bushmills Grammar School	
1953	Friends School Lisburn	4	0	Cookstown High School	
1954	Friends School Lisburn	3	2	Banbridge Academy	
1955	Cookstown High School	1	0	Bushmills Grammar School	
1956	Banbridge Academy	1	0	Newry Grammar School	
1957	Campbell College	3	0	Friends School Lisburn	
1958	Friends School Lisburn	2	1	Banbridge Academy	
1959	Friends School Lisburn	3	1	Wallace High School	

=== 1960s ===
Year	Winner			Runner-up	Notes
1960	Friends School Lisburn	2	0	Bushmills Grammar School	
1961	Royal Belfast Academical Institution	2	1	Banbridge Academy	
1962	Ballycastle High School & Bushmills Grammar School	0	0	TROPHY SHARED	
1963	Friends School Lisburn & Royal Belfast Academical Institution	0	0	TROPHY SHARED	After extra time
1964	Ballycastle High School	3	0	Strabane Grammar School	
1965	Methodist College	1	0	Ballycastle High School	
1966	Friends School Lisburn	2	0	Methodist College	
1967	Royal Belfast Academical Institution	2	1	Newry High School	
1968	Friends School Lisburn & Royal Belfast Academical Institution	0	0	TROPHY SHARED	
1969	Cookstown High School	2	1	Royal Belfast Academical Institution	

=== 1970s ===
Year	Winner			Runner-up	Notes
1970	Royal Belfast Academical Institution	1	0	Bangor Grammar School	
1971	Friends School Lisburn & Royal Belfast Academical Institution	0	0	TROPHY SHARED	after extra time
1972	Cookstown High School	2	1	Kilkeel High School	
1973	Cookstown High School	2	0	Wallace High School	
1974	Cookstown High School	1	0	Newry High School	
1975	Friends School Lisburn	2	0	Royal Belfast Academical Institution	
1976	Friends School Lisburn & Cookstown High School	1	1	TROPHY SHARED	After extra time
1977	Friends School Lisburn	2	0	Newry High School	
1978	Friends School Lisburn	1	0	Kilkeel High School	
1979	Newry High School	1	0	Wallace High School	

=== 1980s ===
Year	Winner			Runner-up	Notes
1980	Cookstown High School	4	0	Bangor Grammar School	
1981	Newry High School	2	1	Cookstown High School	
1982	Banbridge Academy	1	0	Bangor Grammar School	
1983	Bangor Grammar School	3	0	Wallace High School	
1984	Newry High School	1	0	Royal & Prior School, Raphoe	
1985	Cookstown High School	3	2	Wallace High School	
1986	Campbell College	2	1	Friends School Lisburn	
1987	Royal Belfast Academical Institution	4	0	Bangor Grammar School	
1988	Royal Belfast Academical Institution	3	0	Bangor Grammar School	
1989	Wallace High School	3	1	Newry High School	

=== 1990s ===
Year	Winner			Runner-up	Notes
1990	Cookstown High School	3	1	Methodist College	
1991	Cookstown High School	4	3	Bangor Grammar School	after extra time
1992	Royal Belfast Academical Institution	4	1	Cookstown High School	
1993	Sullivan Upper	2	2	Banbridge Academy	Sullivan won 5-4 on penalties
1994	Royal Belfast Academical Institution	3	2	Banbridge Academy	
1995	Royal Belfast Academical Institution	2	1	Friends School Lisburn	
1996	Cookstown High School	1	0	Royal Belfast Academical Institution	
1997	Cookstown High School	1	0	Bangor Grammar School	
1998	Royal Belfast Academical Institution	3	0	Bangor Grammar School	
1999	Methodist College	3	0	Campbell College	

=== 2000s ===
Year	Winner			Runner-up	Notes
2000	Royal Belfast Academical Institution	4	0	Newry High School	
2001	Wallace High School	3	2	Royal Belfast Academical Institution	
2002	Cookstown High School	1	0	Royal Belfast Academical Institution	
2003	Royal Belfast Academical Institution	5	2	Banbridge Academy	
2004	Royal Belfast Academical Institution	1	1	Banbridge Academy	RBAI won on penalties
2005	Banbridge Academy	1	0	Campbell College	
2006	Banbridge Academy	4	2	Sullivan Upper School	
2007	Banbridge Academy	3	2	Cookstown High School	
2008	Cookstown High School	6	3	Royal and Prior School, Raphoe	after extra time
2009	Cookstown High School	4	3	Banbridge Academy	

=== 2010s ===
Year	Winner			Runner-up	Notes
2009-10	Banbridge Academy	3	0	Campbell College	
2010-11	Banbridge Academy	5	4	Cookstown High School	
2011-12	Banbridge Academy	3	2	Friends School Lisburn	
2012-13	Banbridge Academy	3	1	Sullivan Upper School	
2013-14	Wallace High School	3	3	Banbridge Academy	Wallace HS won 4-1 on penalty strokes
2014-15	Wallace High School	3	2	Banbridge Academy	
2015-16	Banbridge Academy	1	1	Sullivan Upper School	Banbridge won 4-1 on p/strokes
2016-17	Sullivan Upper School	3	2	Wallace High School	
2017-18	Friends' School, Lisburn	2	1	Sullivan Upper School	
2018-19	Wallace High School	3	3	Sullivan Upper School	Wallace won on penalties

=== 2020s ===
Year	Winner			Runner-up	Notes
2019-20	Friends' School and Sullivan Upper School shared			TROPHY SHARED	
2021-22	Banbridge Academy	4	1	Friends School Lisburn	
2022-23	Wallace High School	1	0	Campbell College	
2023-24	RBAI	2	1	Banbridge Academy	
2024-25	RBAI	4	1	Campbell College	
2025-26	Banbridge Academy	2	1	RBAI	

== Footnote ==
- ^{a} Ballyclare Intermediate School would later be renamed as Ballyclare High School.
- ^{b} Lisburn Intermediate School would later be renamed as Wallace High School.
- ^{c} Newry Intermediate School would later be renamed as Newry Grammar School (1948) and then Newry High School (1966).
