= Wellington College Belfast =

Coordinates: 54°34′16″N 05°55′07″W

Location
- 18 Carolan Road; Belfast, County Down, BT7 3HE; Northern Ireland

Information
- School type: Controlled Grammar
- Motto: Una Discamus (We Learn Together)
- Religious affiliation: Non-Denominational
- Established: 1989; 37 years ago
- Status: Open
- Local authority: Education Authority
- Principal: David Castles
- Staff: 69
- Gender: Co-Educational
- Age: 11 to 18
- Enrollment: 790 (2023-2024)
- Houses: Ferguson; Lewis; Heaney; Peters
- Colour
- Website: https://wellingtoncollegebelfast.org

Wellington College Belfast (better known as Wellington College or WCB) is a co-educational, grammar school located in Belfast, Northern Ireland. The most recent principal is David Castles. The school was formed when, in 1989, the all-boys' Annadale Grammar School and the all-girls' Carolan Grammar School merged to become a single school.

== History ==
Wellington College was founded in 1989 after Annadale Boys and Carolan Girls merged. The school is named after Arthur Wellesley, 1st Duke of Wellington. The school moved to its current location on Carolan Road in 2002, which included 2 new rugby pitches, a gravel pitch, an astro pitch and a running track.

In 2002 the new school buildings were officially opened by Andrew Mountbatten-Windsor who met staff and pupils and had lunch with the Head Girls and Boys.

== Principals ==
#	Name	Tenure
1	Mr Derick Woods	1989-1995
2	Mrs Jacqueline Weir	1995-2000
3	Mr Ronnie Hassard	2000-2004
4	Mrs Heather Reid	2004-2009
5	Mr Matthew Pitts	2010-2014
6	Mrs Nicola Connery	2015-2016
7	Mr David Castles	2017–present

== Uniform ==
The Wellington blazer takes its blue colour from that of the British Army during the 19th century which was the uniform worn by the Duke of Wellington during his service. The sports kit for Wellington was changed in May 2011.

== Extracurricular activities ==
Wellington offers a number of extracurricular activities to its pupils. These normally run after school or during lunch time, and are generally overseen by members of the teaching or library staff. In some cases a specialist in a particular subject may be invited to take a course (e.g. In January 2008 Neil Best and Rob Dewey helped with rugby training) Activities include;

- Scripture Union
- Science Club
- Art Club
- Concert Band
- Boys' Choir
- Junior Choir
- Senior Choir
- Junior Brass Group
- Senior Brass Group
- Woodwind Group
- String Trio
- School Council
- Senior Chess Club
- Senior Photography Club
- Drama Club
- Rugby Team
- Hockey Team

== Awards ==
- 2005 International School Award
- The school KLQ team won the Kids' Lit Quiz in 2007 at the world final in Oxford.
- Wellington received an award for raising money and providing donations of items to Haiti after the earthquake.
- In 2012, three pupils in Year 11 won the Northern Irish Regional heat of the WorldWise Geography quiz and then became runners up the next year. The team consisted of Jack Taylor (captain), Adam Callender and Marc Thompson.

=== Future Chef 2011 ===
Christopher Marshall, (a then year 10 pupil) represented Wellington in the Northern Ireland Future Chef competition 2011. He won the Northern Ireland competition on Wednesday 2 February 2011. He was then entered into the Future Chef Final and travelled to London on 21 March 2011 for the competition, getting the chance to meet Ainsley Harriott and Brian Turner.

=== Mathematical Olympiad 2011 ===
Dale Walmsley, (a then year 12 student at Wellington) was awarded a gold medal and a book prize in the UK Intermediate Mathematical Olympiad. Dale was the only student from Northern Ireland to achieve a gold medal and book prize in the Olympiad. This accolade means that he is ranked within the top 50 mathematicians of his age in the UK. Mr Cantley, head of the Mathematics department at Wellington at that time, stated that everyone at the college is absolutely delighted by Dale's achievement. Mr Cantley, who taught Dale since third year, stated that Dale is a truly remarkable young mathematician, having obtained an A* in GCSE Mathematics at only 14, an A* in both GCSE Additional Mathematics and A Level Mathematics at 15 and first place in the 2010 Northern Ireland GCSE Additional Mathematics examination.

== Notable former pupils ==
Name	Notable Accomplishments
Neil Best	Rugby player
Chris Brunt	Footballer
Brian Philip Davis	Film Editor
Stephen Scullion	Athlete
Errol Hastings	Chief artisan baker at J Sainsbury plc
Iain Lewers	Field hockey player
