= Mark Hutchinson (cricketer) =

Irish cricketer

Personal information
- Full name: Mark Kenneth Hutchinson
- Born: 17 October 1978 (age 48); Belfast, Northern Ireland
- Batting: Right-handed

Career statistics
Competition	List A
Matches	3
Runs scored	1
Batting average	0.33
100s/50s	–/–
Top score	1
Catches/stumpings	1/–
- Source: Cricinfo, 2 January 2022

Mark Hutchinson (born October 17, 1978) is an Irish former cricketer. He is a right-handed batsman. He represented Ireland A in three List A one-day cricket matches in the 2006 EurAsia cricket series.

Hutchinson was used as a middle to upper-order batsman, though finding form in the EurAsia tournament in the United Arab Emirates proved difficult for him as a right hand batsman.
