= Lisburn Courthouse =

Judicial facility in Northern Ireland

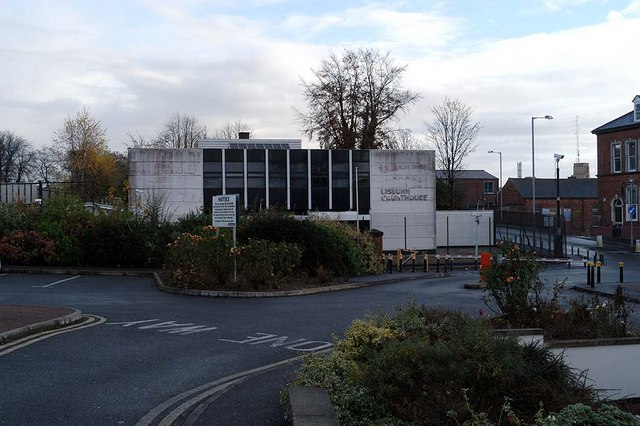
- Lisburn Courthouse

- Location within Northern Ireland

General information
- Architectural style: Brutalist style
- Location: Lisburn, County Antrim, Northern Ireland
- Coordinates: 54.5138°N 6.0443°W
- Completed: 1980

Website
- www.courtsni.gov.uk

Lisburn Courthouse is a judicial facility in Railway Street in Lisburn, County Antrim, Northern Ireland. It is home to the magistrate's and county courts.

== History ==
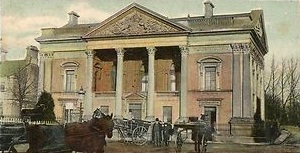
The Old Courthouse in Lisburn, as built in 1884 by Sir Richard Wallace, 1st Baronet. Demolished 1971

In the late 19th century and in much of the 20th century judicial matters were considered in the old courthouse which had been designed by John MacHenry and completed in 1884. It was built at the personal expense of the local landowner and Member of Parliament for Lisburn Sir Richard Wallace, 1st Baronet, of Antrim Castle, and demonstrated his significant financial and political commitment made to the town. The design was based on a largely un-executed design by Andrea Palladio for the Villa Ragona Cecchetto, in Ghizzole, Montegaldella, Veneto, Italy, for his client Girolamo Ragona, a deputy of the nearby City of Vicenza. It involved a symmetrical main frontage which featured a tetrastyle portico with Corinthian order columns supporting a frieze and a heavily carved pediment, on which was sculpted the Wallace coat of arms and his motto "Esperance" (English: "hope").

However, after it was not adequately maintained, its condition deteriorated and it was, ultimately, demolished in 1971. The demolition took place in the face of strong local opposition from local heritage groups and the author, Charles Brett, said shortly after the demolition that "the building was by no means beyond restoration when it was demolished."

It was replaced by a modern facility on the same site which was designed in the Brutalist style and was completed in around 1980. The design involved a central section which featured a glass entrance on the ground floor and a row of glazing on the first floor with black panels above and below; the left and right sections were left as bare concrete: it has been described by one of the local councillors as "one of the city's ugliest buildings".

In May 2012 the justice minister, David Ford, said that he accepted an inspection report recommending that the Lisburn Courthouse should close in a proposed rationalisation of the court system.

== Cases ==
Lisburn was initially used by magistrates before it was opened to county legal matters. Two sessions were regularly held each day by twelve staff in 2005.
