= Kilkeel High School =

Location
- Knockchree Avenue; Kilkeel, County Down, BT34 4BP; Northern Ireland; 54.0589°N 6.001°W

Information
- Type: Controlled
- Motto: Creating Opportunity, Realising Potential and Developing Individuals
- Religious affiliation: Christian Ethos
- Established: 1953
- Principal: Victor Coert
- Gender: Mixed
- Age: 11 to 18
- Enrollment: 750
- Houses: Donard; Eagle; Binnian
- Colour
- Website: kilkeelhigh.org

Kilkeel High School is a controlled secondary school located in Kilkeel, County Down, Northern Ireland. It is within the Southern Education and Library Board area.

== History ==
The school was opened in September 1953 as Kilkeel intermediate School. Mr. William Moore Macauley served as the first principal, and retired in 1971. Additions were made to the school in 1955 and again in 1960.

== Academics ==
This is a school in Northern Ireland where education was devolved matter. Students enter the school in year 8 in the year they will become 12. In the first three years they study a common timetable but classes are organized by ability using information supplied by the feeder primary school. The Key Stage 3 syllabus follows the guidelines set out in the Revised Curriculum for Northern Ireland.

In year 11, for Key Stage 4, students follow the Department of Education’s Entitlement Framework Curriculum, they are obliged to continue with core subjects augmented with options. The option choice will depend on their future aspirations as the choice of GCSE subjects will limit their A level opportunities in Key Stage 5 (Years 13 and 14), which are vital for tertiary education. This is all explained in Careers Guidance lessons, and in explanatory prospectuses.

The core subjects are: Careers, Citizenship, English, Mathematics, Personal Development, Physical Education and Religious Studies. The options must include a science.

To widen the option choice Kilkeel High School has formed a partnership with St Louis Grammar School and Newry and Kilkeel College.

== Sport ==
Kilkeel High has a successful hockey team and the school fields teams in competitions from U-13 to an U-18 1st XI. Despite being a state comprehensive school, it competes in cup competitions dominated by the powerhouse grammar schools in Ulster, and the school regularly qualifies for the "All-Ireland" schools hockey tournament. In 2001 the boys 1st XI reached the final of the prestigious McCullough Cup and despite a brave performance, they eventually lost in a penalty shoot-out.

Kilkeel High school also competes at rugby. All age groups in the school also compete locally at football. The rugby team reached the high schools cup semi-final in which they played against 5 mile town. The team was beaten narrowly due to refereeing errors.

Pupils from the school regularly qualify for County and "All-Ireland" athletics events including cross-country which the school has experienced great success in, in recent years.

== Other competition ==
In 2006 a team from Kilkeel High won the Business and Professional Women UK National Public Speaking Championship. The women's speaking team from Kilkeel has been very successful in recent years, winning various local and national competitions.

== Community activity ==
In 1981 Kilkeel High School students erected a memorial to the victims of the 1916 Carlingford Lough disaster.

== Notable former pupils ==
- Violet McBride; former Great Britain and Ireland women's field hockey international. She represented Great Britain at the 1988 Summer Olympics.
- Lee Feeney; Northern Irish football coach and former professional footballer.
- Diane Forsythe; member of the Democratic Unionist Party and MLA for South Down.
- Johnny Ward; travel blogger who uploads videos to social media. He is also known for travelling to every country in the world.
