= Wallace High School, Lisburn =

The Wallace High School

Location
- 12a Clonevin Park; Lisburn, County Antrim, BT28 3AD; Northern Ireland

Information
- Type: Voluntary grammar school
- Motto: French: Esperance (Hope)
- Established: 1880; 146 years ago
- Founder: Sir Richard Wallace
- Principal: J. Reid
- Gender: Co-educational
- Age range: 11–18
- Houses: Conway; Gracey; Barbour; Hanna; Hamilton; Seymour
- Website: www.wallacehigh.org

The Wallace High School is an 11–18 co-educational voluntary grammar school and sixth form in Lisburn, County Antrim, Northern Ireland.

== History ==
It was founded in 1880 by a bequest from the estate of Sir Richard Wallace, local landowner, Unionist MP and philanthropist, and was originally named Lisburn Intermediate and University School. It was built on a site fronting the Antrim Road. A board of trustees took charge in 1900 to oversee the development of the growing school and, when they renamed it in 1942 in memory of its founder, they adopted the word Esperance (Hope) as the school's motto from the Wallace coat of arms.

The post-war years witnessed rapid growth in pupil numbers and consequent accommodation provision. Land was purchased at Clonevin Park, initially for playing fields, and when the Antrim Road site proved inadequate, the decision was taken to build a new school in these extensive grounds.

Pupils and staff moved to the new building in 1976, and today the school has expanded to 1160 pupils in the grammar school and 200 in the preparatory department.

== School enhancement ==
The Wallace High School underwent construction on a new school expansion project. This included construction of a new two storey extension which includes the subjects of Art, Home Economics, and Moving Image Arts which was finished by the end of December 2017 and officially unveiled on 4 October 2018 . There is a fitness suite which was also unveiled on 4 October which included four power racks, a free weights area with weight-lifting platforms, a blue astro-turf track for conditioning and warm-ups, plate loaded resistance machines and cardio equipment. It also included new changing rooms, new showers and hairdryers. A technology extension is also completed, beginning in February 2018 and concluding in August 2018.

Existing 'mobile' classrooms, of which there are four, have been relocated to allow space for the expansion project. These mobile classrooms include the subjects of English, Maths, Modern Languages, Religious Education, among others.

== Principals ==
Name	Tenure
Hugh Maybin	1901-1936
Thomas Nunan	1936-1948
Thomas Coats Campbell Adam	1948-1969
Noel Gilpin	1969-1988
Ian McCallan	1988–2000
Anne McBride	2000–2009
Deborah O'Hare	2009–2025
Jennifer Reid	2025–present

== Sport ==
=== Rugby ===
Wallace have reached the final of the Ulster Schools' Cup 7 times, most recently in 2025, where they won 24–15 against The Royal School, Armagh. Wallace are one of eight schools who enters in the fourth round of the cup along with Ballyclare High School, Ballymena Academy, Campbell College, Enniskillen Royal Grammar School, Methodist College Belfast, Royal Belfast Academical Institution and the aforementioned Royal School, Armagh.

=== Hockey ===
Wallace High School is noted for men's hockey with wins in the Burney Cup, McCullough Cup and a single win in the All Ireland Championship in 1987–88. In 2011 the hockey girls created history by reaching the final of the Ulster Senior Schoolgirls' Cup for the first time, only to lose on penalties.

== Notable former pupils ==
- Blu Hydrangea, winner of RuPaul's Drag Race: UK vs the World
- The Dean, artist, musician, podcaster, Bon Jovi lookalike
- Dennis Kennedy, journalist, historial and a writer on Irish and European affairs
- Shauna Lowry, TV personality
- The Rt. Hon. Brian Maginess (1901–1967), government minister in the Stormont Parliament
- Drew Nelson (1956–2016), Grand Secretary of the Orange Order
- Edwin Poots, current minister in the Northern Ireland Executive
- Kyle Thomas, popular social media influencer

=== Sport ===
==== Rugby ====
- Chris Henry, professional rugby player for Ulster and Ireland
- Nevin Spence (1990–2012), professional rugby player for Ulster
- Jacob Stockdale, professional rugby player for Ulster and Ireland
- Ian Whitten, professional rugby player for AVIVA Premiership Club Exeter, formerly Ulster

==== Cricket ====
- Neil Doak, Irish cricketer and Irish rugby squad member
- Raymond Hunter, Irish cricketer, Irish rugby and British & Irish Lions
- Thomas Martin (1911–1937), cricketer
- Jack Simpson (1920–1997), cricketer
