= Sullivan Upper School =

Location
- Belfast Road; Holywood, County Down, BT18 9EP; Northern Ireland; 54.635°N 5.837°W

Information
- Motto: Lamh Foisdineach An Uachtar (With the Gentle Hand Foremost)
- Established: 1877
- Board: DENI - Department of Education Northern Ireland
- Head: Craig Mairs
- Enrolment: 1,100
- Colours: Black & Green
- Type: Voluntary Grammar
- Website: http://www.sullivanupper.co.uk/

Sullivan Upper School is a co-educational non-denominational voluntary grammar school in Holywood, Northern Ireland, and has approximately 1,100 enrolled pupils. The school motto is Lámh Foisdineach An Uachtar, Irish for "with the gentle hand foremost".

== History ==
Sullivan Lower School (equivalent to a primary school in modern terminology) was founded in 1862 by Robert Sullivan. After Sullivan's death in 1868, part of his estate was used to establish the upper school. Originally the two schools were based in Holywood's High Street, The lower school has been moved to a site beside the upper school and is now called Sullivan Prep which is a private school and the upper school has moved to a site on the edge of the town. The original building is now occupied by the town's public library.

=== The 1994 attack ===
On 17 June 1994, Garnet Bell, a former pupil, entered the school hall during an A Level exam carrying an improvised flame thrower, containing petrol and paraffin. Bell discharged the device, burning six pupils, three of them seriously. He was subsequently found guilty of three cases of attempted murder and three of grievous bodily harm, receiving six life sentences. Bell died in prison of bowel cancer on 25 March 1997, aged 47.

== Sports ==
Sullivan Upper participates in various sports, including rugby, hockey, golf, volleyball, badminton, tennis, and chess.

The school won the rugby Medallion Shield in 2001 and 2011, and the 2nd XV cup in 2009, beating Royal School, Armagh 14–12. Notable former players include David Erskine, a former senior Ireland international lock and current Ulster and Ireland centre Darren Cave.

In hockey, Sullivan won the 1993 Burney Cup, beating Banbridge Academy after sudden death penalty strokes. In 2006 they reached the final again, losing 4–2. Former team members include Irish senior international player Mark Raphael. In 2009 they also reached the McCullough Cup final for the first time in the school's history. In 2010, the team reached the semi-final of the Burney Cup but lost to Campbell College. In 2017 the school beat Wallace High School 3–2 in the Burnley cup final, the schools first victory since 1993. The school won the McCullough cup the following year beating friends after a late equaliser from Matthew Willis brought the game to a 2–2 draw with Fergus Gibson scoring the decisive penalty. The school also managed to reach the Burney Cup final this year but Friends avenged their earlier defeat, with the game again going to penalties. In 2019 Sullivan reached the Burnley cup final for the third year in a row but narrowly lost out to Wallace on penalty runs. Senior men’s Irish hockey currently still have past pupils Michael and Callum Robson. Michael made selection for the Irish Hockey team in the Rio Olympics.

In cricket, the school reached the Schools Cup final for the first time in their history in 2009, but ended up losing by nine wickets to Foyle and Londonderry College. One notable player was Mark Adair.

Sullivan Upper has a golf team competing in various competitions. One notable previous member is Rory McIlroy.

== The house system ==
The school is divided into four houses: Praeger (red), Grant (green), McAlester (blue), Speers (yellow). Two of the houses, Grant and Speers, were named after ex-headmasters of the school, whereas Praeger was named after the sculptor Rosamond Praeger and her brother Robert. McAlester was named after the Rev. Charles McAlester who sat on the Committee of Sullivan Schools in the 1800s when the school was founded. The school's Preparatory Department, however, only contains three of the four houses - Grant house, which was established in the 1974–75 school year, only exists in the main body of the school. Regular inter-house competitions are held to cultivate house pride, including the House Photography Competition, House Music Competition and Sports Day.

== Notable alumni ==
In 2016, the school launched an alumni directory program to establish a database of past pupils, staff, and governors to allow former pupils and personnel to reconnect.

=== Academia ===
- Prof David E. Logan - Coulson Professor of Theoretical Chemistry, University of Oxford
- Robert Lloyd Praeger - naturalist and historian
- Prof Ian McAllister - Distinguished Professor of Political Science, The Australian National University

=== Arts and media ===
- Garth Ennis - comics writer
- Dan Gordon - actor
- Colin Harper - music journalist
- Maurice Jay - DJ on radio station U105, composer, actor and broadcaster
- Bobby Kildea - guitarist (Belle & Sebastian)
- George Lowden - guitar-maker
- Mark McClelland - bass guitarist
- Gareth McLearnon - musician
- John McCrea - comic artist
- Dermot Murnaghan - Sky News news reader and television personality
- Rosamond Praeger - artist
- Mark Simpson - BBC News Ireland reporter
- Rebekah Fitch - singer-songwriter
- Louis McCartney - actor

=== Politics ===
- Jonathan Bell - former DUP MLA
- Thomas Loftus Cole - Unionist politician
- Chris Lyttle - Alliance Party MLA for East Belfast

=== Sport ===
- Darren Cave - rugby player
- David Erskine - rugby player
- David Jeffrey - Linfield F.C. manager
- Katie Kirk - London 2012 Olympic ceremony torch carrier and flame lighter
- Derek Lawther - footballer, coach (American Olympic, etc.)
- Rory McIlroy - golfer
- Aimee Fuller - snowboarder (Olympics, Sochi 2014)
- Mark Adair - cricketer
- Ross Adair - cricketer

== Notable former staff ==
- Willie Anderson - rugby coach
- Dan Soper- rugby coach
- James Hawthorne - BBC controller
