= Banbridge Academy =

Coordinates: 54.357°N 6.271°W

Location
- Lurgan Road; Banbridge, Down, BT32 4AQ; Northern Ireland

Information
- Motto: Per Deum et Industriam (By God and Industry)
- Religious affiliation: Christian
- Established: 1786
- Head teacher: Robin McLoughlin
- Gender: Male & Female
- Age: 11 to 18
- Enrolment: 1,318
- Houses: Crozier, McWilliam, Dunbar, Waddell
- Colour
- Website: www.banbridgeacademy.org.uk

Banbridge Academy is a grammar school in Banbridge, Northern Ireland, founded in 1786. As of January 2015, the Principal is Robin McLoughlin, previously a headmaster of Grosvenor Grammar School. McLoughlin succeeded Raymond Pollock (1995-2014). Former headmaster Pollock was preceded by Charles Winston Breen (1984–1995), a graduate of Trinity College, Dublin. Breen's work was continued by Pollock, who was made an Officer of the Order of the British Empire in the 2009 New Year Honours list "For services to Education in Northern Ireland".

As of 2014 enrollment stood at over 1,300 pupils and the school had around 90 teachers. The school was in the Top 100 Schools in the United Kingdom for A-Level results 2008 in a list compiled by The Times.

The school traces its roots to the building now known as Dunbar nursery near the current site of Banbridge Leisure Centre but moved to its present home, Edenderry House on the Lurgan Road, in 1950. A redevelopment begun in 1989 provided a new building, while retaining much of the original frontage; interiors and façade are listed. The school building has a glass atrium and dedicated technology suite and science block. The school has two sports halls, and a large amount of land serving as playing fields for hockey, rugby union, cricket, football and netball, together with five tennis courts.

In building work, the assembly hall was demolished and a new dining hall with a small sports hall and a large fitness suite inside were built. A science block was constructed in place of the old dining hall. The work took seven years to complete, finishing in 2012.

== Academic results ==
Banbridge Academy consistently ranks in the top 100 schools in the UK, as rated by The Times It fell in 2009 to 93rd, from 73rd in 2008. The 40.2% A grade success rate at A-Level and 53.8% of submissions achieving A/A* at GCSE level placed it as the 7th best school in Northern Ireland.

An inspection of the school in 2000 and follow up inspection noted many strengths of the school in Science and Technology, including, "the relationships between the pupils and their teachers; the commitment of the teachers; some very good teaching; some very high standards of pupils’ project work in technology and design, and the improvement in standards in science through effective target setting." The original report noted weaknesses in the range of teaching methods used, ICT skills and monitoring of pupils. Between 2000 and 2002 the inspectors found "thorough process of review and planning, to address the issues identified at the time of the inspection." It is noted in the follow-up inspection that results had improved, self-evaluation had been introduced, the opportunity for pupils to investigate scientifically and IT provisions had been improved.

== Extracurricular activities ==
Banbridge Academy is the strongest school in boys' hockey in Ireland, having won numerous Burney and McCullough Cups over the years. In 2006 and 2015 they were crowned Irish schools champions and in 2006 came 2nd in the European schools competition in The Hague.

The school gives pupils the opportunity to take part in a number of sports including badminton, cricket, football, hockey, netball and rugby

The school has two choirs (Girls' Choir and Junior Choir) and an orchestra. The school has an annual theatrical production in November/December, Christmas carol concert and Spring concert.

There are a number of other extracurricular activities, including Bridge Club, Craft Club, Young Enterprise, Creative Writing Club, Cadets and Junior and Senior Scripture Unions.

All internal school competitions are based around the House system. Every pupil is randomly assigned a House in Year 8 (if they have older siblings in the school they will be assigned to the same house as their sibling), and when they participate in any activities during their time in the school, points are awarded to their House. The Houses are named after notable local figures, and are:

- Dunbar (Hugh Dunbar, local linen merchant)
- Waddell (Helen Waddell, scholar and writer who spent her last years at Kilmacrew House, near Banbridge)
- McWilliam (F. E. McWilliam, surrealist sculptor born in Banbridge in 1909)
- Crozier (Captain Francis Crozier, British naval officer and Arctic explorer, born in Banbridge in 1796)

== Notable former pupils ==
- Joanne Cash, Baroness Cash of Banbridge is the front row spokesperson for human rights and education. A former Commissioner for the Equality and Human Rights Commission (EHRC) and Conservative parliamentary candidate
- Jo-Anne Dobson, former MLA for Upper Bann and councillor
- Diane Dodds, MLA for Upper Bann and former member of the European Parliament
- Gary Foster, phytopathologist
- Melissa Hamilton, ballet dancer
- Tyrone Howe, Irish rugby player and former UUP councillor
- Eugene Magee, field hockey player
- Alan Nelson, cricketer
- Lynda Patterson, priest, 13th dean of Christchurch, New Zealand
- Deirdre Heenan, first female provost of Magee College in Derry
- Ellie Scott, Northern Ireland goalkeeper
- Philip Doyle, Irish rower/ Irish X2 Olympic athlete (2020, 2024)
- Jack Carson, cricketer
