= Newry High School =

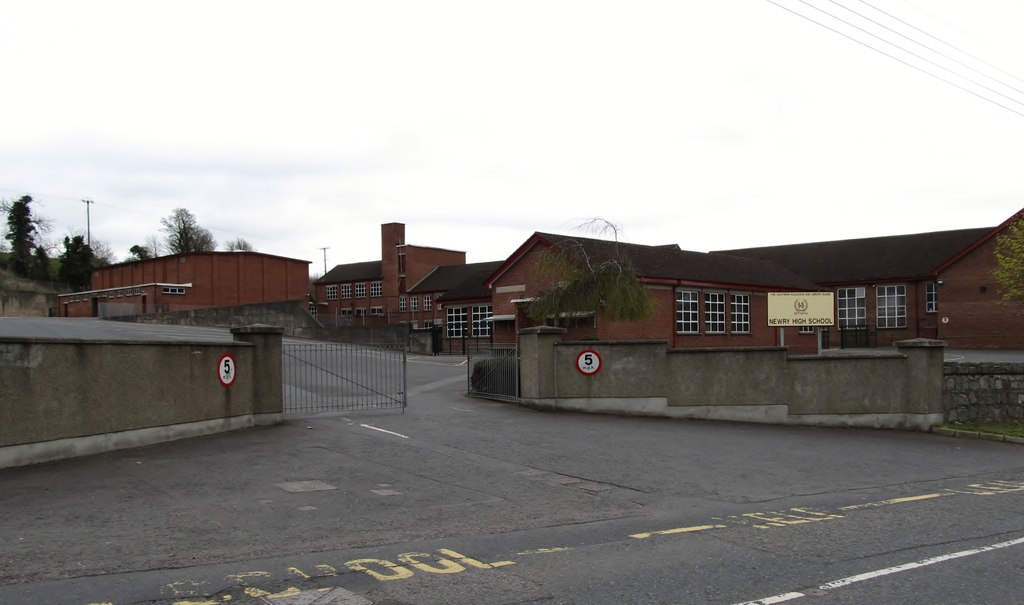

Location
- 23 Ashgrove Road; Newry, County Down, BT34 1QN; Northern Ireland; 54.190°N 6.333°W

Information
- Type: Secondary school
- Motto: Quality Education for All
- Established: 1896
- Local authority: Southern Education and Library Board
- Principal: I. Brown
- Gender: Mixed
- Age: 11 to 18
- Enrolment: 440
- Website: https://newryhigh.com/

Newry High School is a secondary school in Newry, County Down, Northern Ireland, UK. It is a controlled, co-educational school for pupils aged 11–18.

As of 2023, the principal was Iestyn Brown.

In November, 2012, The Guardian reported on a study examining the religious affiliation of Northern Irish schools in 2011 and 2012, which found that Newry High School students were 60.8 percent Protestant, 27.5 percent Catholic, and 11.7 percent "other."

== History ==
Following the passing of the Intermediate Education (Ireland) Bill in 1878, many secondary educational institutions were built across Ireland. In 1896, a group of local businessmen and clergy established the Newry Intermediate School on Hill Street.

Following changes to the educational system with the 1947 Education Act, the school changed its name to Newry Grammar School in 1948.

In 1966/1967, the school changed its name again to Newry High School and became a co-educational secondary school.

== Curriculum ==
The school follows the Northern Ireland Curriculum at Key Stages 3 and 4.

The school has a learning support centre that offers individualised programmes for students who need extra assistance.

== Notable former students ==
- Mary Haughey, Baroness Ballyedmond (b. 1947) is the richest person in Northern Ireland. She was Head Girl during her enrollment at Newry High School.
- Danny Kennedy (b. 1959), Ulster Unionist Politician and MLA for Newry and Armagh (1998-2017)
