= Friends' School, Lisburn =

School in Lisburn, Northern Ireland

Coordinates: 54.518°N 6.045°W

- Lisburn, County Antrim, Northern Ireland

Information
- Type: Voluntary grammar with preparatory department
- Motto: Quae sursum sunt quaerite – Seek the things that are above
- Religious affiliations: Religious Society of Friends (Quaker)
- Established: 1774
- Principal: Stephen Moore
- Enrolment: 1000
- Colours: Green, Red and Yellow
- Age range: 4 to 18
- Denomination: Quaker
- Website: www.friendsschoollisburn.org.uk/

Friends' School, Lisburn is a Quaker voluntary grammar school in the city of Lisburn, Northern Ireland, founded in 1774.

== History ==
Friends’ School Lisburn was founded – as The Ulster Provincial School – on the basis of a bequest in 1764 of a prosperous linen merchant, John Hancock, who left £1,000 for the purchase of land in or near Lisburn on which to build a school for the children of Quakers. Twenty acres (8 ha) at Prospect Hill were purchased from the Earl of Hertford. In 1774, the first headmaster, John Gough, took up his post. In 1794 The Ulster Provincial School became the responsibility of the Ulster Quarterly Meeting, the body representing the Religious Society of Friends in Ulster.

Pupils going to school in c. the 1920s

Friends' is one of two remaining Quaker schools in Ireland, the other being Newtown School, Waterford. Previously, a Quaker boarding school existed at Ballitore for much of the 18th and 19th centuries. There are eight in the United Kingdom.

The school has been named by The Sunday Times as Northern Ireland Secondary School of the Year on three occasions: 2011, 2017 and 2025.

== Principals ==
| No. | Name | Tenure |
|---|---|---|
| 1 | John Gough | 1774-1791 |
| 2 | Thomas Barrington | 1796–1800 |
| 3 | William Crothers | 1802 |
| 4 | Samuel Douglas | 1804-1817 |
| 4 | Henry Bragg | 1817-1822 |
| 5 | George Greer | 1822-1837 |
| 6 | Bedford Gilkes | 1837-1840 |
| 7 | William Bellows | 1840-1841 |
| 8 | Henry Beale | 1841-1843 |
| 9 | Seth Gill | 1844-1848 |
| 10 | Joseph Black | 1848-1850 |
| 11 | William Groom | 1850-1854 |
| 12 | John Ward | 1856-1860 |
| 13 | Samuel Evans | 1860-1862 |
| 14 | John Wardall | 1862-1863 |
| 15 | Frank Dymond | 1864-1869 |
| 16 | Thomas Robson | 1870-1874 |
| 17 | Joseph Radley | 1874-1899 |
| 18 | William Braithwaite | 1900-1911 |
| 19 | John Ridges | 1911-1921 |
| 21 | Cyril Spencer-Smith | 1921-1929 |
| 22 | John Douglas | 1929-1952 |
| 23 | Ivan Gray | 1952-1961 |
| 24 | Neville Newhouse | 1961-1970 |
| 25 | Arthur Chapman | 1970-1989 |
| 26 | Trevor Green | 1989-2001 |
| 27 | Elizabeth Dickson | 2001-2015 |
| 28 | Stephen Moore | 2015-present |

== Composition ==
The school consists of a fee-paying preparatory department, Prospect House, and a grammar school, the latter of which had, until the early 2000s, a boarding department attracting pupils from abroad (mostly Hong Kong). Friends' now only accepts day pupils, and has had an admissions number of 140 a year, with 5 "collect" groups (6 collect groups as of 2024) in each year contributing to a full enrolment of 970 for the grammar school. However, starting in 2022, a new system was introduced for Year 8 Pupils in which there are now 6 collects with a total of around 160 in the year.

The original school house is no longer standing, but the date stone from it is displayed in Middle House, a building dating from 1880, which was refurbished in 2015. The latest addition to the school is the East Suite, a teaching building containing Maths and Music classes, which was opened in 2016. It stands in place of the old basketball court, which was previously the location of the swimming pool. The swimming pool was reputed to be the oldest heated pool in Ireland (1901), and used to stand beside Harding House, a temporary teaching building which was demolished to make space for the East Suite. The school has five tennis courts and three rugby pitches. A sports hall was opened in 2000 and two floodlit, sand-dressed hockey pitches were laid in 2013. As well as hosting school fixtures, these pitches are home to South Antrim Hockey Club.

== Notable former pupils ==
- Wallace Arthur, biologist and author
- Michael Dibdin, author
- Stephen Ferris, rugby player for Ulster, Ireland, British and Irish Lions
- Keith Getty, musician and hymn writer
- Bulmer Hobson, leading member of Irish Volunteers and Irish Republican Brotherhood
- Florence Fulton Hobson, first licensed female architect in Ireland
- Rikki Keag, Irish badminton player
- Jimmy Kirkwood, Gold medal winning Olympic hockey player (Team GB, Seoul 1988)
- Robert Moore, first-class cricketer
- Gareth Murdock, musician and current bass guitarist of Alestorm
- Frank Pantridge CBE, cardiologist, inventor of the portable defibrillator
- Alastair Ross, former Member of the Northern Ireland Assembly (2007–2017), former Northern Ireland Executive Office Minister
- Theo Snoddy, art historian
- Sir William Tyrrell (1885-1968), physician and athlete.

== See also ==
- List of Friends schools
