= Peter Caruth =

Irish field hockey player (b. 1988)

Personal information
- Full name: Peter Caruth
- Born: 4 June 1988 (age 38) Belfast, Northern Ireland
- Height: 173 cm (5 ft 8 in)
- Weight: 73 kg (161 lb)

Sport
- Sport: Field hockey
- Position: Forward/Midfielder
Youth career
- Years: Team
- 19xx–20xx: Campbell College
Senior career
Years	Team	Caps	Goals
20xx–2012	Annadale	-	-
2012–2013	Braxgata (Belgium)	-	-
2013–2016	Monkstown	-	-
2016–	Annadale	-	-
National team
Years	Team	Caps	Goals
2008–	Ireland	148	(27)
Coaching career
- 2016–: Annadale
Medal record
Representing Ireland
EuroHockey Championships
Bronze medal – third place	2015 London	Team

Peter Caruth (born 4 June 1988) is an Ireland men's field hockey international. He was a member of the Ireland team that won the bronze medal at the 2015 Men's EuroHockey Nations Championship. He also represented Ireland at the 2016 Summer Olympics. At club level he has won Men's Irish Hockey League titles and the EuroHockey Club Trophy with Monkstown and the Kirk Cup with Annadale.

== Early years, family and education ==
Caruth is from Belfast, Northern Ireland. He was educated at Gilnahirk Primary School, Cabin Hill School and Campbell College.

In 2022, Caruth came out as gay, becoming the first Irish men's international hockey player to do so.

== Domestic teams ==
=== Early years ===
As a youth Caruth played field hockey for both Campbell College and Annadale. The 2012–13 season saw him play for Braxgata in the Men's Belgian Hockey League.

=== Monkstown ===
In 2013 Caruth began playing for Monkstown in the Men's Irish Hockey League. He subsequently helped Monkstown win the league title in both 2013–14 and 2014–15. In the 2013–14 league final he scored twice as Monkstown defeated Banbridge 2–1. Together with Graham Shaw and Kyle Good, Caruth was also a member of the Monkstown team that won the 2014 EuroHockey Club Trophy. He again scored in the final as Monkstown defeated HC OKS-SHVSM of Ukraine 2–0. Caruth also played for Monkstown in the 2014–15 and the 2015–16 Euro Hockey Leagues.

=== Annadale ===
In 2016 Caruth re-joined Annadale, this time as a player/coach. In 2016–17 he guided Annadale to promotion form the Ulster Senior League to the Men's Irish Hockey League. He also scored a hat-trick as Annadale defeated Cookstown 8–1 in the Kirk Cup final. In 2018 Caruth and Anndale again played in the Kirk Cup final but this time, they lost to Banbridge.

== Ireland international ==
Caruth made his senior debut for Ireland in October 2008 in a 2–2 draw with Argentina. He had previously played for Ireland A. He made his major tournament debut at the 2009 Men's Hockey World Cup Qualifiers. Caruth was a member of the Ireland team that won the 2011 Men's Hockey Champions Challenge II. He also helped Ireland win Men's FIH Hockey World League tournaments in 2012 and 2015. At the 2014–15 Men's FIH Hockey World League Semifinals, Caruth made his 100th senior appearance for Ireland. Caruth was also a member of the Ireland team that won the bronze medal at the 2015 Men's EuroHockey Nations Championship. He also represented Ireland at the 2016 Summer Olympics.

Tournaments	Place
2009 Men's EuroHockey Nations Trophy	1st
2009 Men's Hockey World Cup Qualifiers	3rd
2011 Men's Hockey Champions Challenge II	1st
2011 Men's EuroHockey Nations Championship	5th
2012 Men's Field Hockey Olympic Qualifier	2nd
2012–13 Men's FIH Hockey World League Round 1	1st
2012 Men's Hockey Champions Challenge I	3rd
2012–13 Men's FIH Hockey World League Semifinals	7th
2013 Men's EuroHockey Nations Championship	6th
2014–15 Men's FIH Hockey World League Round 2	1st
2014–15 Men's FIH Hockey World League Semifinals	5th
2015 Men's EuroHockey Nations Championship	3rd place, bronze medalist(s)
2016 Summer Olympics	10th

== Coach ==
In addition to his role as a player/coach with Annadale, Caruth has also coached at Muckross Hockey Club and Campbell College.

== Honours ==
Ireland

- Men's FIH Hockey World League Round 2
  - Winners: 2015 San Diego
- Men's FIH Hockey World League Round 1
  - Winners: 2012 Cardiff
- Men's Hockey Champions Challenge II
  - Winners: 2011
- Men's Field Hockey Olympic Qualifier
  - Runners up: 2012

Annadale

- Kirk Cup
  - Winners: 2016
  - Runners up: 2018

Monkstown

- EuroHockey Club Trophy
  - Winners: 2014
- Men's Irish Hockey League
  - Winners: 2013–14, 2014–15
- Irish Senior Cup
  - Winners: 2015–16
