= Jimmy Kirkwood (field hockey) =

Great Britain and Ireland hockey player

Personal information
- Born: 12 February 1962 (age 64) Lisburn, Northern Ireland
- Height: 182 cm (6 ft 0 in)
- Weight: 80 kg (176 lb)

Sport
- Sport: Field hockey
- Position: Forward
Senior career
Years	Team	Caps	Goals
19xx–1986	Queen's University	-	-
198x–198x	Belfast YMCA	-	-
198x–199x	Lisnagarvey	-	-
198x–19xx	→ Ulster	-	-
National team
Years	Team	Caps	Goals
1981–1995	Ireland	^{(Note 1)}	-
1987–19xx	Great Britain	^{(Note 2)}	-
Medal record
Representing Great Britain
Olympic Games
Gold medal – first place	1988 Seoul	Team
Representing Ireland
EuroHockey Junior Championship
Silver medal – second place	1978 Dublin	Team

James William Kirkwood (born 12 February 1962) is a former field hockey player from Northern Ireland who represented both Ireland and Great Britain at international level. He represented Great Britain at the 1988 Summer Olympics when they won the gold medal. He also represented Ireland at the 1990 Men's Hockey World Cup. Kirkwood was also an Ireland cricket international.

== Biography ==
=== Early years, family and education ===
Kirkwood was educated at Friends' School, Lisburn and Queen's University Belfast where he studied Economics. In his youth, in addition to playing field hockey and cricket, Kirkwood also included played rugby union, playing for Friends' School, Lisburn in the Ulster Schools' Cup.

=== Field hockey career ===
At senior club level, Kirkwood played for Queen's University, Belfast YMCA and Lisnagarvey. During his club career he won ten Irish Senior Cup winners medals. He won his first with Queen's in 1981 and his second with Belfast YMCA in 1985. Then between 1987–88 and 1993–94 he was an ever-present in the Lisnagarvey team that won the cup for seven successive seasons. He won his tenth medal when Lisnagarvey won the cup in 1996–97.

Kirkwood was a member of the Ireland team that were silver medallists at the 1978 EuroHockey Junior Championship. Other members of the team included Martin Sloan, Billy McConnell and Stephen Martin. He made his senior debut for Ireland at the age of 18 in 1981. He subsequently represented Ireland at the 1987, 1991 and 1995 Men's EuroHockey Nations Championships. He also represented Ireland at the 1990 Men's Hockey World Cup. During the latter tournament, during a match against Canada, Kirkwood sustained a horrific injury when he felt the full force of an opponent's stick in his face. He was taken to hospital and missed the rest of the tournament. In 2014 Kirkwood was inducted into the Irish Hockey Association Hall of Fame.

Kirkwood made his debut for Great Britain at the 1987 Men's Hockey Champions Trophy tournament. He subsequently represented Great Britain at the 1988 Summer Olympics, winning a gold medal.

Tournaments	Place	Team
1978 EuroHockey Junior Championship	2nd place, silver medalist(s)	Ireland
1981 Intercontinental Cup		Ireland
1985 Intercontinental Cup		Ireland
1987 Men's EuroHockey Nations Championship	6th	Ireland
1987 Men's Hockey Champions Trophy	4th	Great Britain
1988 Summer Olympics	1st place, gold medalist(s)	Great Britain
1988 Men's Hockey Champions Trophy ?	6th	Great Britain
1989 Intercontinental Cup		Ireland
1990 Men's Hockey World Cup	12th	Ireland
1990 Men's Hockey Champions Trophy	6th	Great Britain
1991 Men's EuroHockey Nations Championship	7th	Ireland
1993 Intercontinental Cup		Ireland
1995 Men's EuroHockey Nations Championship	5th	Ireland

=== Cricket career ===
Kirkwood began playing for Lisburn Cricket Club as a schoolboy. In 1985 his man of the match performance helped the club win the NCU Challenge Cup, defeating NICC in the final. He also represented Ulster Country at senior interprovincial level. Kirkwood represented Ireland at schoolboy, under-19 and under-23 levels before making his senior international debut on 17 August 1983 against Gloucestershire. During the same tour, Kirkwood also featured in matches against Wales and the MCC. Kirkwood made 27 runs at an average of 8.6, with his high score of 27 coming against Gloucestershire.

== Personal life ==
Kirkwood worked as a banker for HSBC in Belfast.

== Honours ==
=== Field hockey ===
Great Britain

- Olympic Games
  - Winners: 1988

Ireland

- EuroHockey Junior Championship
  - Runners up: 1978

Lisnagarvey

- EuroHockey Club Trophy
  - Winners: 1991: 1
  - Runners-up: 1989: 1
- Irish Senior Cup
  - Winners: 1987–88, 1988–89, 1989–90, 1990–91, 1991–92, 1992–93, 1993–94, 1996–97: 8
- Ulster Senior League
  - Winners: 1989–90, 1990–91, 1991–92, 1993–94, 1994–95, 1996–97: 6
- Kirk Cup
  - Winners: 1989–90
- Anderson Cup
  - Winners: 1986–87, 1993–94, 1995–96, 1996–97: 4

Belfast YMCA

- Irish Senior Cup
  - Winners: 1985

Queen's University

- Irish Senior Cup
  - Winners: 1981

=== Cricket ===
Lisburn

- NCU Challenge Cup
  - Winners: 1985

== Notes ==
- ^1 Some sources credit Kirkwood with 130 appearances for Ireland. Others credit him with 48.
- ^2 Some sources credit Kirkwood with 40 appearances for Great Britain. Others credit him with 31.
