= Martin Sloan =

Ireland men's field hockey international

Personal information
- Born: c. 1962 (age 63–64) County Tyrone, Northern Ireland

Sport
- Sport: Field hockey
- Position: Midfielder
Youth career
- Years: Team
- 197x–198x: Cookstown High School
- 1979–1980: → Ulster Schools
Senior career
Years	Team	Caps	Goals
197x–2010	Cookstown	-	-
198x–199x	→ Ulster	-	-
National team
Years	Team	Caps	Goals
1982–1995	Ireland	149	-
1987	Great Britain	6	-
Medal record
Representing Ireland
EuroHockey Junior Championship
Silver medal – second place	1978 Dublin	Team

Martin Sloan, also referred to as Marty Sloan, is a former field hockey player from Northern Ireland who represented Ireland and Great Britain at international level. Between 1982 and 1995 he made 149 senior appearances for Ireland. Between 1987 and 1995 he captained Ireland on 107 occasions. He represented Ireland at the 1983, 1987, 1991 and 1995 EuroHockey Nations Championships and at the 1990 Men's Hockey World Cup. Sloan also made 6 senior appearances for Great Britain. He is the father of Ian Sloan, the Ireland, England and Great Britain international.

== Domestic teams ==
=== Cookstown High School ===
Sloan attended Cookstown High School where he was a member of teams that won McCullough Cup and Burney Cup finals.

=== Cookstown ===
Sloan was a member of the Cookstown team that won the EuroHockey Club Trophy in 1981. He also helped Cookstown win the 1986–87 Irish Senior Cup, defeating Banbridge 4–0 in last final to be played on grass. Towards the end of Cookstown career, he played in the seconds with his two sons, Stephen and Ian. He retired from playing at end of 2009–10 season. He later helped coach youth teams at Cookstown.

=== Ulster ===
Sloan also represented Ulster at interprovincial level. He played at Under-18 before going on to play for the senior Ulster team for eleven years, captaining Ulster to seven interprovincial titles.

== International ==
=== Ireland ===
Between 1982 and 1995 Sloan made 149 senior appearances for Ireland. He represented Ireland at Under-18 and Under-21 levels before making his senior debut. Sloan was a member of the Ireland team that were silver medallists at the 1978 EuroHockey Junior Championship. Other members of the team included Stephen Martin, Jimmy Kirkwood and Billy McConnell. On 18 June 1982, aged 20, Sloan made his senior debut for Ireland in a 7–0 win against Sweden during a EuroHockey Nations Championship qualifying tournament. He subsequently represented Ireland at the 1983, 1987, 1991 and 1995 EuroHockey Nations Championships. He also played for Ireland at the 1985, 1989 and 1993 Men's Intercontinental Cups and at the 1990 Men's Hockey World Cup. On 3 July 1987 he captained Ireland for the first time in an 8–1 win against Belgium. In July 1995 he captained Ireland for the 100th time in a 4–0 win against Italy. In total he captained Ireland on 107 occasions, including at the 1990 Men's Hockey World Cup and at the 1995 Men's EuroHockey Nations Championship when they finished 5th.

=== Great Britain ===
Sloan also made 6 appearances in two tournaments for Great Britain. He played for Great Britain at the 1987 Sultan Azlan Shah Cup. He was a member of the Great Britain training squad for the 1988 Summer Olympics. However he did not make the final tournament squad.

Tournaments	Place	Team
1978 EuroHockey Junior Championship	2nd place, silver medalist(s)	Ireland
1983 Men's EuroHockey Nations Championship	10th	Ireland
1985 Men's Intercontinental Cup	6th	Ireland
1987 Men's EuroHockey Nations Championship	6th	Ireland
1987 Sultan Azlan Shah Cup	3rd	Great Britain
1989 Men's Intercontinental Cup	5th	Ireland
1990 Men's Hockey World Cup	12th	Ireland
1991 Men's EuroHockey Nations Championship	7th	Ireland
1993 Men's Intercontinental Cup	9th	Ireland
1995 Men's EuroHockey Nations Championship	5th	Ireland

== Personal life ==
Sloan is married to Adele and has two sons, Stephen and Ian. All three are also field hockey players. Adele Sloan is a former Ireland international. Between 2007 and 2013 she served as the head teacher at Cookstown High School. Stephen has played for Cookstown. Ian is an Ireland, England and Great Britain international. Away from field hockey, Martin Sloan served as a director of the Northern Health and Social Care Trust.

== Honours ==
Ireland

- EuroHockey Junior Championship
  - Runners up: 1978

Cookstown

- EuroHockey Club Trophy
  - Winners: 1981: 1
- Irish Senior Cup
  - Winners: 1986–87: 1
- Ulster Senior League
  - Winners: : ?
- Kirk Cup
  - Winners: : ?
- Anderson Cup
  - Winners: : ?

Cookstown High School

- Burney Cup
  - Winners: : ?
- McCullough Cup
  - Winners: : ?
