= Corinthian Hockey Club =

Field hockey club in Dublin, Ireland

- Union: Hockey Ireland
- Full name: Corinthian Hockey Club
- Founded: 1934
- Ground: St Columba's College; Rathfarnham; Dublin 16; Ireland
- Website: www.chc.ie
- League: Men's Irish Hockey League; Women's Irish Hockey League

Corinthian Hockey Club (Irish: Club Haca Corantaigh) is a field hockey club based at Saint Columba's College, Dublin, Ireland. In 2018–19 they became founder members of the new Division 2 in both the Men's Irish Hockey League and the Women's Irish Hockey League. The club's senior men also play in the Men's Irish Senior Cup while the senior women also play in the Women's Irish Senior Cup. Reserve teams play in the Men's Irish Junior Cup and the Women's Irish Junior Cup. Corinthian won the 2012 Men's Irish Junior Cup, defeating Cookstown in the final.

In the 1890s an earlier club named Corinthian, along with Monkstown and Three Rock Rovers, were among the pioneering field hockey clubs in Ireland. The modern club was founded in 1934.

== Notable former players ==
Ireland women's field hockey international

- Alison Meeke

== Honours ==
=== Men ===
- Irish Junior Cup
  - Winners: 2012
