= Parkview Hockey Club =

Sporting organisation in Northern Ireland

- Union: Ulster Hockey Union
- Founded: 1898
- League: Ulster Junior Leagues

Parkview Hockey Club is a hockey club affiliated to the Ulster Branch of the Irish Hockey Association. It was founded as Fisherwick Hockey Club in 1898, changing its name to Parkview in 1924. It is based in the County Antrim village of Doagh, near Ballyclare, where both teams primarily play their home games. The club's founding members were workers from the local spinning mills and from agriculture. The 1st XI plays in Junior 3 of the Ulster Junior Leagues with a 2nd XI playing in Junior 5.

== History ==
=== Pre World War II record ===
Prior to World War II, Parkview played as a Junior League club. The major success during this period came in the 1936-37 season when the club’s first team won the Irish Junior Cup for the only time in the club’s history.

=== Senior League progress ===
The period between World War II and mid 1970s was the most successful period for the club.

In 1948-49 Parkview won a test match against Antrim in the Ulster Senior League. In 1950, 1955 and 1956, Parkview lost three test matches to decide the destination of the Keightley Cup. The Kirk Cup was shared in 1955-56 and the Anderson Cup was won in 1958-59.

The 1960s saw Parkview bounce between the Senior League and the Qualifying League. However further success was achieved in knock-out competitions with another Kirk Cup win in 1966-67.

=== 1980s onwards ===
1983 saw the club relegated to the Intermediate League and it took 11 years to regain senior status. Promoted after the 1993-94 season, Parkview initially challenged for promotion to Section 1 in its first few years back. After seven years, however, senior status was relinquished again when the Senior League was reorganized after the 2000-01 season. Parkview returned briefly for one season when they won Section 2 in 2001-02. In the 2006–07 season, Parkview finished in fourth place in Section 2, fifteen points behind Down.

=== 2020s onwards ===
The 2010s produced years of poor results that threatened the club and their ability to regrow and develop. As a result, the club requested and was subsequently granted permission to drop from the Intermediate League to the bottom of the Junior Leagues, Junior 5, for the 2021-22 season. Remaining in the league for 1 season, the club was able to begin their rebuild, gaining more players and enjoying an unbeaten 2022-23 season in which they won the Minor Cup and gained promotion to Junior 4. In the 2023-24 season, the club founded a 2nd XI who joined Junior 5, finishing bottom of the league in their debut season but remaining in the league each season after despite the formation of Junior 6. The 1st XI earned promotion to Junior 3 in 2024-25, remaining in the league.

== Grounds ==
In 1970, a clubhouse built by the members was opened, and in 1974 it was renovated to include a bar. With no pitch at the clubhouse, the senior teams play their home matches on the artificial turf at Foundry Lane (Ballyclare High School).

== Honours ==
- Irish Junior Cup (1): 1936-37
- Kirk Cup (2): 1955-56 (shared), 1966-67
- Anderson Cup (1): 1958-59
