= Anderson Cup (field hockey) =

Sporting competition on the island of Ireland

The Anderson Cup is a hockey tournament for clubs that are members of the Premier League of the Ulster Senior League. The current holder is Bangor.

== Trophy ==
The trophy was donated to the Ulster Hockey Union of the Irish Hockey Association by Mr T N Anderson as a memorial for his brother Captain J G Anderson MC. Captain Anderson was a prominent member of the Banbridge Hockey Club and Irish International player who was killed whilst serving in the Royal Army Medical Corps in World War I. One of the conditions requested by the donor was that the Final should be played at the ground of Banbridge Hockey Club. The Ulster Hockey Union agreed to this condition except for when Banbridge was one of the Finalists.

== Current format ==
From 2015-16, the competition reverted from nine-a-side back to eleven-a-side. Played in the second half of the season, all Ulster Premier League teams take part. From 2018-19 Ulster members of the Irish Hockey League also take part.

== Historical formats ==
Until the reorganisation of Senior hockey after the 2000-01 season, all the senior league clubs participated in the Anderson Cup. The trophy was competed for through an open draw.

Between 2001-02 and 2008-09 the eight teams competing in the Premier League of the Ulster Senior League were drawn into two groups of four. The winners and runners-up of these two groups then proceeded to the semi-finals.

The competition became a nine-a-side tournament until reverting to eleven-a-side in 2015-16.

The gate receipts at the Final of the competition were donated to hospital charities, and the competition was often referred to as the Anderson Charity Cup. At the 1926 Final record gate receipts of £50 was reported.

Following the reorganisation of the league structure following the 2008-09 season until 2014-15, the ten clubs of the Premier League of the Ulster Senior League and the ten Section One teams competed for the trophy. The competition reverted to an open draw format.

== Finals ==
=== 1920s ===
Year	Venue	Winner	Score	Score	Runner-up	Notes
1919-20		Banbridge				
1920-21		Banbridge				
1921-22		Antrim	3	1	Queen's University	Replay - Game 1: 0-0
1922-23		Lisnagarvey			Antrim	
1923-24	Bladon Drive	Banbridge	2	1	Antrim	
1924-25	Banbridge	Lisnagarvey	1	0	Cliftonville	
1925-26	Banbridge	Antrim	2	1	South Antrim	
1926-27	Bladon Drive	Banbridge	2	1	Lisnagarvey	2nd Replay - Game 1: 2-2; Game 2:
1927-28	Lisburn	Banbridge	2	0	North Down	Replay - Game 1: 0-0
1928-29		Antrim	1	0	Cliftonville	

=== 1930s ===
Year	Venue	Winner	Score	Score	Runner-up	Notes
1929-30	Banbridge	Cliftonville	4	1	Antrim	
1930-31		Banbridge	2	0	Antrim	Replay - Game 1: 2-2
1931-32	Banbridge	Cliftonville	2	0	Holywood	
1932-33	Bladon Drive	Banbridge	1	0	Cliftonville	
1933-34	Bladon Drive	Lisnagarvey	2	1	Banbridge	
1934-35	Banbridge	Lisnagarvey	2	1	Antrim	
1935-36	Banbridge	Queen's University	2	1	North Down	
1936-37	Banbridge	Cliftonville	2	0	East Antrim	
1937-38	Banbridge	Lisnagarvey	3	1	East Antrim	
1938-39	Banbridge	Antrim	1	0	North Down	Replay - Game 1: 2-2

=== 1940s ===
Year	Venue	Winner	Score	Score	Runner-up	Notes
1939-40		Not Played				
1940-41		Not Played				
1941-42	Banbridge	Queen's University	2	1	Plebs	
1942-43	Banbridge	Lisnagarvey	3	2	Queen's University	
1943-44	Cliftonville	Banbridge	1	0	Lisnagarvey	
1944-45		Banbridge				
1945-46		Lisnagarvey	3	0	Banbridge	
1946-47	Banbridge	Lisnagarvey			Portrush	Replay - Game 1: 2-2
1947-48	Banbridge	Antrim	3	1	North Down	
1948-49	Banbridge	Antrim	3	1	North Down	

=== 1950s ===
Year	Venue	Winner	Score	Score	Runner-up	Notes
1949-50	Bladon Drive	Portrush	2	1	Banbridge	after extra time
1950-51	Bladon Drive	Antrim	1	0	Banbridge	2nd Replay - Game 1: 0-0; Game 2:
1951-52	Bladon Drive	Lisnagarvey	2	1	Banbridge	
1952-53	Banbridge	Antrim	2	1	Lisnagarvey	
1953-54	Cliftonville & Paisley Park	Lisnagarvey	5	2	Banbridge	Replay - Game 1: 0-0
1954-55		Lisnagarvey	2	1	Antrim	
1955-56	Cliftonville	Lisnagarvey	4	2	Banbridge	after extra time
1956-57	Blaris	Queen's University	3	2	Banbridge	
1957-58	Banbridge	Lisnagarvey	1	0	Belfast YMCA	2nd Replay - Game 1: 0-0; Game 2:1-1
1958-59	Banbridge	Parkview	1	0	Antrim	

=== 1960s ===
Year	Venue	Winner	Score	Score	Runner-up	Notes
1959-60	Cliftonville	Lisnagarvey	2	1	Banbridge	Replay - Game 1: 1-1
1960-61	Blaris	Lisnagarvey	4	1	Belfast YMCA	Replay - Game 1: 1-1
1961-62	Blaris	Cliftonville	1	0	Banbridge	Replay - Game 1: 0-0
1962-63	Blaris	Portrush	2	0	Queen's University	
1963-64	Banbridge; Blaris	Lisnagarvey	4	2	Belfast YMCA	Replay - Game 1: 0-0
1964-65	Portadown	Portrush	4	1	Lisnagarvey	
1965-66	Portadown	Cliftonville	1	0	Portrush	
1966-67		Mossley				
1967-68						
1968-69						

=== 1970s ===
Year	Venue	Winner	Score	Score	Runner-up	Notes
1969-70		Banbridge				
1970-71						
1971-72						
1972-73		Banbridge				
1973-74		Banbridge				
1974-75	Blaris	Banbridge	3	0	Belfast YMCA	
1975-76	Banbridge	Lisnagarvey	4	0	Instonians	
1976-77		Annadale	2	1	Lisnagarvey	
1977-78		Instonians	3	2	Lisnagarvey	after extra time
1978-79	Banbridge	Belfast YMCA	2	1	Mossley	

=== 1980s ===
Year	Venue	Winner	Score	Score	Runner-up	Notes
1979-80	Banbridge	Lisnagarvey	1	0	Antrim	
1980-81	Banbridge	Lisnagarvey	3	1	Mossley	
1981-82		Banbridge	1	0	Instonians	
1982-83		Cookstown	2	1	Banbridge	
1983-84		Banbridge	1	0	Cookstown	
1984-85		Belfast YMCA	1	0	N.I.C.S.	
1985-86		Banbridge	1	0	Antrim	after extra time
1986-87		Lisnagarvey	4	2	Banbridge	
1987-88		Holywood '87	4	1	Banbridge	
1988-89		Mossley	2	0	Bangor	

=== 1990s ===
Year	Venue	Winner	Score	Score	Runner-up	Notes
1989-90		Holywood '87	2	0	Banbridge	
1990-91		Banbridge	3	1	Mossley	
1991-92		Banbridge	6	1	Mossley	
1992-93		Cookstown	2	0	Banbridge	
1993-94	Blaris	Lisnagarvey	4	0	Banbridge	
1994-95	Blaris	Instonians	3	2	Banbridge	after extra time
1995-96	Blaris	Lisnagarvey	1	0	Annadale	
1996-97	Blaris	Lisnagarvey	2	1	Banbridge	
1997-98		Banbridge				
1998-99						

=== 2000s ===
Year	Venue	Winner	Score	Score	Runner-up	Notes
1999-00						
2000-01		Annadale	3	2	Mossley	
2001-02						
2002-03						
2003-04		Annadale				
2004-05		Annadale				
2005-06	Banbridge	Banbridge	2	1	Lisnagarvey	
2006-07	Banbridge	Annadale	2	1	Instonians	
2007-08	Banbridge	Lisnagarvey	2	1	Banbridge	after extra time
2008-09	Banbridge	Banbridge	1	1	Instonians	after extra time, 4-2 on penalties

=== 2010s ===
Year	Venue	Winner	Score	Score	Runner-up	Notes
2009-10	Banbridge	Banbridge	3	2	Lisnagarvey	
2010-11						
2011-12						
2012-13		Cookstown			Kilkeel	
2013-14	Banbridge	Cookstown			Lisnagarvey	Played on a group basis
2014-15	Banbridge	Banbridge			Lisnagarvey	
2015-16	Banbridge	Kilkeel	4	3	Belfast Harlequins	
2016-17	Banbridge	Cookstown	5	2	Kilkeel	
2017-18	Stormont	Kilkeel	3	3	Mossley	Kilkeel won on penalties
2018-19	Banbridge	Lisnagarvey	3	1	Banbridge	

=== 2020s ===
Year	Venue	Winner	Score	Score	Runner-up	Notes
2019-20		unknown				
2020-21		not played due to corona				
2021-22		unknown				
2022-23		Lisnagarvey	4	3	Banbridge	
2023-24		Banbridge	4	2	Lisnagarvey	
2024-25	Banbrisge	Bangor	3	2	South Antrim	
2025-26	Banbridge	Banbridge	5	4	Lisnagarvey	
