= Portrush Hockey Club =

Field hockey club in Northern Ireland

- League: Intermediate League of Ulster Hockey
- Conference: Ulster Hockey Union
- Founded: 1909
- Colors: Amber and Black

Portrush Hockey Club is a hockey club affiliated to the Ulster Branch of the Irish Hockey Association based in Portrush, County Antrim. The club currently plays in the Intermediate League of Ulster Hockey.

== Formation ==
The club was founded on 29 September 1909 at a meeting held in the Osborne Hotel, Portrush. The club initially joined and played in the North West Hockey League.

== Grounds ==
The first home ground from 1911 to 1935 was at Metropole, moving to Randal Park from 1935 to 1948. After 1948 the club found a permanent home at Seaview Park.

The advent of artificial turf pitches has necessitated playing home fixtures away from Portrush. Currently the club uses Ballycastle artificial turf pitches and UUC pitches for the occasional game

== 1920s and 1930s ==
After World War I Portrush achieved success in 1922 by winning the Braddell Shield. A win in the Intermediate Cup was gained the following year.

The North-West Senior Cup was won in 1924, 1927 and 1928.

Portrush won their first Major trophy when the Irish Junior Cup was secured in 1932. This team featured Fred Daly, who went on to become the Open Golf champion in 1947.

At this time, Portrush moved to play in the Senior Qualifying League of the Ulster Senior League. At the end of the 1930s they won the Ulster Section of the Irish Senior Cup.

== 1940s to 1970s ==
Portrush won the Irish Junior Cup for the second time in 1943, a feat that was repeated in 1946.

Senior status was granted in 1947, and was marked by the club winning the Kirk Cup and the Ulster Section of the Irish Senior Cup.

The Anderson Cup was won for the first time in the 1949–50 season.

In the 1957–58 Portrush tied a Test match against Banbridge and both were declared joint winners of the Keightley Cup for the Ulster Senior League champions.

In 1963–64, Portrush beat Lisnagarvey in the Ulster Final of the Irish Senior Cup, but went on to lose to Cork Church of Ireland in the all-Ireland semi-final.

The following year, 1964–65, was the club's most successful year. Portrush won the Anderson Cup for the third time and they also beat Banbridge in the Kirk Cup Final. In addition, the Final of the Irish Senior Cup was reached for the only time in Club history. After a 1–1 draw in Belfast, Portrush lost after extra time to Dublin YMCA in the replay.

The Kirk Cup success in 1969–70 was the last time that Portrush would win a Senior trophy.

== 1970s to present day ==
The closure of Busmills Grammar School in 1975, meant that Portrush no longer had a feeder school. A long decline eventually led to the loss of Senior status in 1988.

Senior status was obtained again for three years from 1993 to 1994 until 1995–96 and for two years in 1999-00 and 2000–01.

In 2007 the club moved their Home matches to The Quay Road, Ballycastle. As a result Ballycastle High School now became an excellent feeder school for the club and the club now has 7 players who are still attending Ballycastle High School.

Portrush won their first trophy since the Linden Cup victory in 1999. Portrush claimed a 3–2 victory over Ballynahinch on 1 January 2014 to claim the Sussex Regiment Cup. Senior Status was again obtained after a 13-year wait in 2014 after losing only one league game all season. Portrush will now play Senior League 1 hockey in the 2014/15 season.

== Honours ==
- Irish Junior Cup
  - 1931–32, 1942–43, 1945–46.
- Ulster Senior League
  - Shared 1957–58.
- Kirk Cup
  - 1948–49, 1964–65, 1969–70.
- Anderson Cup
  - 1949–50, 1962–63, 1964–65.

Sussex Regiment Cup 2014

Senior Two (Cliftonville Cup) 2014

Irish Hockey Challenge Cup 2020

== Irish Internationals ==
- James McVicker was capped for Ireland against Wales in 1914.
- Don Minihan
- Ronnie McManus
- Jimmy Shanks

Recent Junior Ulster representatives

- Aaron Kerr
- Graeme Christie
