= Stephen Martin (field hockey) =

Great Britain and Ireland hockey player

Personal information
- Full name: Stephen Alexander Martin
- Born: 13 April 1959 (age 67) Bangor, County Down; Northern Ireland
- Height: 182 cm (6 ft 0 in)
- Weight: 76 kg (168 lb)

Sport
- Sport: Field hockey
- Position: Defender
Youth career
- Years: Team
- 197x–197x: Bangor Grammar School
- 1976–1978: → Ulster Schools
Senior career
Years	Team	Caps	Goals
197x–198x	Bangor	-	-
1980–1991	→ Ulster	-	-
1983–1985	→ Ulster Elks	-	-
1980–1987	Belfast YMCA	-	-
1987–1994	Holywood 87	-	-
1994–2000	Newry Olympic	-	-
20x–20x	Annadale	-	-
2008–2009	Lisnagarvey	-	-
National team
Years	Team	Caps	Goals
1980–1991	Ireland	135	(10)
1983–1992	Great Britain	94	(4)
Medal record
Representing Great Britain
Olympic Games
Gold medal – first place	1988 Seoul	Team
Bronze medal – third place	1984 Los Angeles	Team
Champions Trophy
Silver medal – second place	1985 Perth	Team
Bronze medal – third place	1984 Karachi	Team
Representing Ireland
EuroHockey Junior Championship
Silver medal – second place	1978 Dublin	Team

Stephen Alexander Martin MBE (born 13 April 1959) is a former field hockey player from Northern Ireland who represented both Ireland and Great Britain at international level. Between 1980 and 1991 he made 135 senior appearances for Ireland. He also captained the Ireland team. He represented Ireland at the 1983, 1987 and 1991 EuroHockey Nations Championships and at the 1990 Men's Hockey World Cup. Between 1983 and 1992 Martin also made 94 senior appearances for Great Britain. He represented Great Britain at the 1984, 1988 and 1992 Summer Olympics, winning a bronze medal in 1984 and a gold medal in 1988. In 1994 he was awarded an MBE. In 2001 he was awarded an Honorary Doctorate by Ulster University. In 2011 Martin was inducted into the Irish Hockey Association Hall of Fame. After retiring as a field hockey player, Martin became a sports administrator. Between 1998 and 2005 he was Deputy Chief Executive of the British Olympic Association and between 2006 and 2018 he was Chief Executive of the Olympic Council of Ireland. He now runs his own leadership and management consultancy business and is an associate consultant at Lane 4. He is Chair Commonwealth Games NI.

== Early years, family and education ==
Martin is the son of Jim and Mamie Martin. His father was originally from Portadown while his mother was originally from Lisbellaw. They both moved to Donaghadee in the early 1950s and when Stephen was born on 13 April 1959, they were living in Bangor, County Down. The Martins ran a local garage and a car repair shop in Bangor. Martin was educated at Bangor Central Primary School, Bloomfield Road Primary School, Bangor Grammar School and Ulster University. He graduated from Ulster University in 1985 with a BA Honours Degree in Sport and Leisure Studies. In his youth he played both association football and rugby union before his older brother, Phillip, introduced him to field hockey. He was also a notable golfer. He was a member of the Bangor Grammar School team that won the Ulster and Irish schools golf championship in 1976 and 1977. Other members of the team included his older brother Philip Martin, David Feherty and Mark Robson, the Sky Sports rugby union commentator.

== Domestic teams ==
As a schoolboy Martin played field hockey for Bangor Grammar School and Ulster Schools. At senior club level he has played for several clubs including Bangor, Belfast YMCA, Holywood 87, Newry Olympic and Annadale. Martin also represented Ulster University at intervarsity level, helping Ulster Elks win the 1985 Mauritius Cup. He also represented Ulster at interprovincial level. In 2008 and 2009 he played alongside his son, Patrick, in the second team at Lisnagarvey.

== International ==
=== Ireland ===
Martin was a member of the Ireland team that were silver medallists at the 1978 EuroHockey Junior Championship. Other members of the team included Martin Sloan, Jimmy Kirkwood and Billy McConnell. He made his senior Ireland debut aged 19. Between 1980 and 1991 he made 135 senior appearances for Ireland. He also captained the Ireland team. He represented Ireland at the 1983, 1987 and 1991 EuroHockey Nations Championships and at the 1990 Men's Hockey World Cup. In 2011 Martin was inducted into the Irish Hockey Association Hall of Fame.

=== Great Britain ===
Between 1983 and 1992 Martin made 94 senior appearances for Great Britain. He made his debut for Great Britain against the United States. He subsequently represented Great Britain at the 1984, 1988 and 1992 Summer Olympics, winning a bronze medal in 1984 and a gold medal in 1988. Martin also represented Great Britain in Champions Trophy tournaments, winning a bronze medal in 1984 and a silver in 1985.

Tournaments	Place	Team
1978 EuroHockey Junior Championship	2nd place, silver medalist(s)	Ireland
1983 Men's EuroHockey Nations Championship	10th	Ireland
1984 Summer Olympics	3rd place, bronze medalist(s)	Great Britain
1984 Men's Hockey Champions Trophy	3rd place, bronze medalist(s)	Great Britain
1985 Men's Hockey Champions Trophy	2nd place, silver medalist(s)	Great Britain
1986 Men's Hockey Champions Trophy	4th	Great Britain
1987 Men's EuroHockey Nations Championship	6th	Ireland
1987 Men's Hockey Champions Trophy	4th	Great Britain
1988 Summer Olympics	1st place, gold medalist(s)	Great Britain
1988 Men's Hockey Champions Trophy	6th	Great Britain
1989 Men's Intercontinental Cup	5th	Ireland
1990 Men's Hockey World Cup	12th	Ireland
1990 Men's Hockey Champions Trophy	6th	Great Britain
1991 Men's EuroHockey Nations Championship	7th	Ireland
1991 Men's Hockey Champions Trophy	5th	Great Britain
1992 Men's Hockey Champions Trophy	5th	Great Britain
1992 Summer Olympics	9th	Great Britain

== Sports administrator ==
While still an active field hockey player, Martin worked for the Ulster Hockey Union as a Sports Development Manager. Between 1992 and 1998 he worked for Sport Northern Ireland as a Performance Manager. Between 1998 and 2005 he was Deputy Chief Executive of the British Olympic Association. He also was Chef de Mission for Great Britain at the 2000 and 2004 Summer Olympics and at the 2002 Winter Olympics. Between 2006 and 2018 he was Chief Executive of the Olympic Council of Ireland. He was Deputy Chef de Mission for Ireland at the 2012 Team Irelands most successful and best prepared team in Olympic history, and 2016 Summer Olympics. He was also Chef de Mission for Ireland at the 2014 and 2018 Winter Olympics. He was sports manager for Team NI at the Birmingham 2022 Commonwealth Games - Team NI's most successful in their history. In November 2022 he was elected as Chair Commonwealth Games NI.

Position	Employer	Years
Sports Development Manager	Ulster Hockey Union	1985–1991
Performance Manager	Sport Northern Ireland	1992–1998
Deputy Chief Executive	British Olympic Association	1998–2005
→ Chef de Mission	Great Britain at the 2000 Summer Olympics	
→ Chef de Mission	Great Britain at the 2002 Winter Olympics	
→ Chef de Mission	Great Britain at the 2004 Summer Olympics	
Chief Executive	Olympic Council of Ireland	2006–2018
→ Deputy Chef de Mission	Ireland at the 2012 Summer Olympics	
→ Chef de Mission	Ireland at the 2014 Winter Olympics	
→ Deputy Chef de Mission	Ireland at the 2015 European Games	
→ Deputy Chef de Mission	Ireland at the 2016 Summer Olympics	
→ Chef de Mission	Ireland at the 2018 Winter Olympics	

== Personal life ==
Martin is married to Dorothy Armstrong. They have two children, Patrick and Hannah. The Martin family home is in Holywood, County Down. Martin's wife and children have all played field hockey at a senior level. Dorothy played in the Ulster Senior League for Knock and Grosvenor. She later worked as a PE teacher at Priory Integrated College. Patrick Martin has played for Lisnagarvey in the Men's Irish Hockey League while Hannah Martin, a graduate of Ulster University, has played for Ards in the Women's Irish Hockey League. Her coaches have included her father.

== Honours ==
Great Britain

- Olympic Games
  - Winners: 1988
- Champions Trophy
  - Runners up: 1985

Ireland

- EuroHockey Junior Championship
  - Runners up: 1978

Ulster Elks

- Mauritius Cup
  - Winners: 1985: 1
