= Cookstown Hockey Club =

Hockey club in Northern Ireland

Cookstown Hockey Club is a hockey club based in Cookstown, County Tyrone, Northern Ireland. It is affiliated to the Ulster Branch of the Irish Hockey Association and was founded in 1951. The first team currently plays in the Premier League of the Ulster Senior League. In addition the club also fields five Junior League teams and two ladies' teams. The ladies' team currently play in the second tier of Ulster Hockey in senior league section one.

== Early years ==
From their foundation in 1951, Cookstown gained promotion from the Junior League to Intermediate League Section A of the Ulster Senior League in season 1954–55.

A period of consolidation followed before Cookstown started to progress upwards in the ranks of Ulster hockey. In 1966-67 Intermediate League Section A was finally won to gain entry to Qualifying League Section B. The following season saw their league won again and promotion to Qualifying League Section A.

When the Ulster Senior League was re-organised after the 1968–69 season, Cookstown had performed well enough in their first season in Qualifying League Section A to secure a place in the new Section 2. For the next five seasons Cookstown proved to be one of the stronger teams in the Section, but always fell just short of promotion to the top flight of Ulster hockey.

Season 1974-75 finally brought the long-awaited win of Section 2 and Cookstown secured their place in the top flight of the Ulster Senior League. Their position in the top Section of the League has been retained continuously from that date.

== 1980s ==
The 1980s was a period of success for the club and saw Cookstown experience European competition for the first time.

In 1979-80 the club fought its way through to the Irish Senior Cup Final for the first time, losing to Belfast YMCA by two goals to nil. The disappointment was tempered when their opponents were unable to represent Ireland in the European Club Cup as participation would involve playing on a Sunday and Cookstown accepted an invitation to take their place.

Cookstown won a qualifying tournament and went on to the main event in Rome. They won the Final on penalty-flicks. They became the first Club in Ireland to win a major European competition.

In 1983 the club won the Ulster Senior League Section 1 for the first time in their history. They made it a double by also winning the Anderson Cup.

The Irish Senior Cup came to Cookstown for the first time in 1986–87. As underdogs they beat Banbridge 4–0 at Blaris, in the last Final to be played on a real grass pitch.

In 1988, as a result of their Irish Senior Cup success, Cookstown were again in European competition and finished 7th in the Premier section of the tournament held in the Netherlands.

The only major trophy that had eluded Cookstown, the Kirk Cup, was finally won in 1988-89 when Mossley were beaten by one goal to nil at Blaris.

The 2nd team also joined the trophy winning when they won two Irish Junior Cups in 1983 and 1985.

== 1990 onwards ==
The successes of the 1980s were hard to follow and a long barren spell ensued before a return to success with the capture of the Kirk Cup in 2002-03 and 2006–07.

The club attained their best league position since the eighties, when they finished second in 2006–07. A winner-takes-all game against the eventual winners Annadale in the last fixture of the season was lost. A victory would have won the league for Cookstown.

In the 2007–08 season, Cookstown captured the Premier League for the second time in their history.

The premier league title was retained in the 2008–09 season and the Kirk Cup was also secured. The Premier League and Kirk Cup double was repeated in 2009–10.

The league title was lost in 2010–11. However, a 24-year wait came to an end when Cookstown once again won the Irish Senior Cup in 2011 by defeating Monkstown by four goals to three in the final.

== Honours ==
- Irish Senior Cup (2 wins)
  - 1986–87, 2010-11
- Irish Junior Cup (2 wins)
  - 1982–83, 1984–85
- Ulster Senior League (7 wins)
  - 1982–83, 2007–08, 2008–09, 2009-10 2011–12, 2016–17, 2023-24
- Kirk Cup (6 wins)
  - 1988–89, 2002–03, 2006–07, 2008–09, 2009–10, 2012-13
- Anderson Cup (5 wins)
  - 1982–83, 1992–93, 2012–13, 2013–14, 2016–17

== Notable players ==
=== Men's internationals ===
Ireland

- David Ames
- Andy Barbour
- Keith Black
- Mark Burns
- Colin Donaldson
- Geoff Hamilton
- Ian Hughes
- David Larmour
- Martin Sloan
- Ian Sloan
- Timmy Smyth

Great Britain

- David Ames
- Martin Sloan
- Ian Sloan

England

- David Ames
- Ian Sloan
- Max Anderson

== Facilities ==
- Sand Dressed Pitch
- Water Based Pitch
- Clubhouse
