= C.I.Y.M.S. Hockey Club =

CIYMS Hockey Club
- Club kit
- Founded: 1896
- Dissolved: 2025
- Colors: Black, green and red
- Home ground: CIYMS Sports Club, Belmont, Circular Road, Belfast, Northern Ireland

Personnel
- Manager: Dixon Rose (Secretary; 2011–2012)

Affiliation
- Conference: Ulster Branch of the IHA

CIYMS Hockey Club was a hockey club based at C.I.Y.M.S. Sports Club, Circular Road, Belfast. Home fixtures were played on a sand-filled artificial surface. The club was founded in 1896 as Cliftonville and was one of the founding members of the Ulster Hockey Union. The 1st XI currently plays in the Ulster Senior League. The first reported match was played against North Down at Comber in November 1896 where an eight-goal to nil loss was recorded. In 2018, the club changed its name to CIYMS. In 2025, it merged with Annadale, which became CI Annadale Hockey Club.

== Grounds ==
The club's origins lie in the Cliftonville area of north Belfast. The club played games at Solitude before finding a permanent home with the Cliftonville Cricket Club at the Cliftonville Cricket Ground on the other side of the Cliftonville Road.

In late August 1972, the clubhouse was burned and looted during civil unrest. Physical sectarian intimidation prevented the members from entering the grounds. The club sought help without success from local and government authorities, in the hope that the club could be protected and assisted in the continue playing hockey and cricket at the ground. As a result, the club abandoned the ground and took up a nomadic existence.Cliftonville Cricket Club web archive

The first grounds used in exile were the Girls' Model School pitches at Dunkeld Gardens. In 1981, the club moved to Boucher Road Playing Fields. Then, in 1986, the Boucher Playing Fields were closed and Cliftonville moved to the Queen's University pitches until taking over the tenancy of Belfast YMCA all-weather pitch at Bladon Drive in 1987.

In 1992, the decision was made that all 1st XI home games would be played on the artificial pitch at the Olympia Leisure Centre.

The club found a new permanent home with CIYMS Sports Club at Belmont in 2004.

Today the historic original ground is the property of the Belfast City Council and is used by the local community but not for cricket or hockey.

== 1960s and 1970s ==
Following the resumption of competitive hockey following World War II, from 1945 to 1962, the club won no senior trophies. The 1st XI were thus relegated from the Ulster Senior League to Qualifying League for the 1958–59 season. However, the following season, the team was promoted once again to the Ulster Senior League, where it would remain for the next 20 years.

In 1963–64, the 2nd XI won the Irish Junior Cup, this has proved to be the only success in this competition.

The Ulster Senior League was won seven times between the 1966–67 and 1975–76 seasons, and they were runners-up in 1965–66, 1969–70 and 1974–75. The Anderson Cup and Kirk Cup were also won in this period.

The Irish Senior Cup was won in 1974–75 and 1975–76, for only the second and third time in the club's history. This led to qualification to play in the European cup-winners' competition.

== Honours ==
- Irish Senior Cup (3 wins)
  - 1931–32, 1974–75, 1975–76.
- Irish Junior Cup (1 win)
  - 1963–64.
- Ulster Senior League (9 wins)
  - 1906–07, 1928–29, 1930–31, 1966–67, 1967–68, 1968–69, 1972–73, 1973–74, 1975–76.
- Ulster Senior League 2 (1 win)
  - 2014–15.
- Kirk Cup (6 wins)
  - 1903–04, 1911–12, 1929–30, 1930–31, 1967–68, 1968–69.
- Anderson Cup
  - 1929–30, 1931–32, 1936–37, 1961–62 (incomplete)
- Sussex Regiment Cup (2 win)
  - 2014–15, 2015–16, 2016–17.
