= Anderson Cup =

Anderson Cup may refer to:

- Anderson Cup (ice hockey)
- Anderson Cup (field hockey)
