= Men's Irish Hockey League =

Field hockey league

- First season: 2008–09
- Administrator: Hockey Ireland
- No. of teams: 10 (Division 1); 10 (Division 2)
- Country: Republic of Ireland; Northern Ireland
- Confederation: EHF (Europe)
- Most recent champion: Lisnagarvey
- Most titles: Lisnagarvey (6 titles)
- Level on pyramid: 1 and 2
- Relegation to: Senior provincial leagues
- Domestic cup: Irish Senior Cup
- International cups: Euro Hockey League; EuroHockey Club Trophy
- Website: www.hockey.ie

The Men's Irish Hockey League is a field hockey league organised by Hockey Ireland that features men's teams from both the Republic of Ireland and Northern Ireland. The league was first played for during the 2008–09 season. It replaced the All-Ireland Club Championships as the top level men's field hockey competition in Ireland. Since 2015–16 the league has been sponsored by Ernst & Young and, as a result, it is also known as the EY Hockey League.

== History ==
=== Format ===
The league was first played for during the 2008–09 season. Between 2008–09 and 2014–15 the league used pool stages and play-offs to determine the league champion. Teams were divides into two pools with the winners and runners-up in each pool then qualifying for the semi-finals. The league title was then decided by a final. Teams continued to play in their respective provincial leagues and qualified for the next season's national league via their position in the provincial league. However for the 2015–16 season the league was reorganised. The pool stages were abandoned and replaced with a full league programme consisting of 18 rounds of home and away matches. In addition the play-offs were effectively replaced by a new competition, the EY Champions Trophy. Furthermore the clubs no longer entered their senior teams in provincial leagues.

=== 2000s/2010s ===
The first season of the Irish Hockey League saw Pembroke Wanderers win the league following a shoot-out win against Glenanne, with goalkeeper David Harte saving multiple penalties to seal the victory. They would repeat the feat the next season, lead once again by player-coach Craig Fulton.

Lisnagarvey would win the 2011-12 title following successive final defeats in the previous years.
Graham Shaw guided Monkstown to three successive league titles in 2012–13, 2013–14 and 2014–15.

The 2015–16 season introduced a new format, replacing the previous pool-stage system with a full league structure. Lisnagarvey went on to win the inaugural title under the revised format. They would again win the league in the 2018-19 season

In 2017–18 Glenanne won the league title for the first time. They secured the title after defeating Lisnagarvey 4–2. Glenanne were 2–0 down before Shane O'Donoghue scored a hat-trick.

=== 2020s ===
The 2019–20 season began as normal, with Lisnagarvey leading the table after eleven games. The competition was suspended in March 2020 due to the COVID-19 pandemic and was later declared null and void by Hockey Ireland, with no champion awarded.
The 2020-21 season would also be cancelled due to the pandemic

The 2020s have thus far been dominated by two Ulster clubs — Lisnagarvey and Banbridge — with the league title alternating between them since competition resumed. Lisnagarvey claimed the league in 2022, 2025 and 2026, while Banbridge won back to back titles in 2023 and 2024.

The 2025-26 season would see the two teams fight for the title once again with Lisnagarvey winning the league after leapfrogging Banbridge on the final day of the season after Banbridge conceded a final play equaliser against Avoca, sending Lisnagarvey top after they came out as 1-0 victors over YMCA.

=== Division 2 ===
The 2018–19 season saw the introduction of a Division 2. The new division revived the original format of the league. From the initial season until the 2024-25 season the league used pool stages and play-offs to determine the Division 2 champion and which teams get promoted to Division 1. From the 2025–26 season the format changed to a singular league with 10 teams, the top two of which would be promoted to Division 1.

Teams qualify for the league by being part of the top three in their respective provincial leagues with the tenth place being alternated yearly between the Ulster and Leinster fourth place team. Division 2 teams continue to play in their respective provincial leagues.

== 2026–27 teams ==
2026–27 Men's Irish Hockey League Division 1
Location of Dublin teams

=== Division 1 ===
Team	Home town/suburb	Home pitch
Avoca	Dublin (Blackrock)	Newpark Comprehensive School
Banbridge	Banbridge	Havelock Park
Corinthians	Dublin (Rathfarnham)	St Columba's College
Cork Harlequins	Cork	Farmers Cross
Lisnagarvey	Hillsborough	Comber Road
Monkstown	Dublin (Dún Laoghaire–Rathdown)	Merrion Fleet Arena
Pembroke Wanderers	Dublin (Sandymount)	Serpentine Avenue
Portrane	Portrane/Donabate	Donabate Community College
Three Rock Rovers	Dublin (Rathfarnham)	Grange Road
YMCA	Dublin (Ballinteer)	Wesley College

For the 2026–27 EY Hockey League Division 1, Cork Harlequins and Portrane join the league having been promoted from the EYHL Division 2, while Cork Church of Ireland and Cookstown were relegated.

Cork Harlequins return to the division after a 12-year absence, having last competed at this level in 2013–14. Portrane make their debut in the division after winning Division 2 the previous season.

2025-26 Men's Irish Hockey League Division 2

=== Division 2 ===
2025–26 Teams

Team	Home town/suburb	Home pitch
Annadale	Belfast	Comber Road
Bandon	Bandon	Bandon Grammar School
Bray	Bray/Greystones	Temple Carrig School
Catholic Institute	Limerick	Catholic Institute Athletic Club
Clontarf	Dublin (Clontarf)	Mount Temple
Cork Harlequins	Cork	Farmers Cross
Instonians	Belfast	Shaws Bridge
Portrane	Portrane/Donabate	Donabate Community College
Queen's University	Belfast	Upper Malone
South Antrim	Lisburn	Friends' School

Five new teams joined the EY Hockey League Division 2 for the 2025-26 season with the league moving from a pool format to a round-robin league format. The newly qualified teams are Catholic Institute from Munster, Bray from Leinster and Annadale, South Antrim and Queen's University all being new sides from Ulster.
Annadale had been relegated from the EYHL Division 1 the previous season

== Winners ==
=== Division 1 ===
Pool Format

Season	Winners	Score	Runners up
2008–09	Pembroke Wanderers (1)	1-1 (Note: Pembroke Wanderers win 2–1 after shoot-out.)	Glenanne
2009–10	Pembroke Wanderers (2)	4–1	Lisnagarvey
2010–11	Banbridge (1)	2–2 (Note: Banbridge win after shoot-out.)	Lisnagarvey
2011–12	Lisnagarvey (1)	3–1	YMCA (Dublin)
2012–13	Monkstown (1)	4-3	Banbridge
2013–14	Monkstown (2)	2–1	Banbridge
2014–15	Monkstown (3)	2–1	Banbridge

League Format

Season	Winners	Runners up
2015–16	Lisnagarvey (2)	Monkstown
2016–17	Banbridge (2)	Three Rock Rovers
2017–18	Glenanne (1)	Three Rock Rovers
2018–19	Lisnagarvey (3)	Three Rock Rovers
2019–20	Season declared null and void due to the COVID-19 pandemic	
2020–21	Season not played due to COVID-19 pandemic	
2021–22	Lisnagarvey (4)	Three Rock Rovers
2022–23	Banbridge (3)	Lisnagarvey
2023–24	Banbridge (4)	Glenanne
2024–25	Lisnagarvey (5)	Three Rock Rovers
2025–26	Lisnagarvey (6)	Banbridge

Notes

=== Division 2 ===
Since the 2021-22 season both the winner and runner up of the EYHL2 Playoffs earn automatic promotion
In the 2025-26 Season the format changed to a round-robin league format from the previous pool format. The top two sides in the league would be promoted to EYHL1.

Pool Format

Year	Winners	Runners up
2018-19	Corinthians	UCD (Note: UCD beat Cork Church of Ireland in a promotion/relegation playoff)
2019-20	(Note: 2019–20 declared null and void. Season abandoned due to the COVID-19 pandemic in the Republic of Ireland and Northern Ireland)	
2020-21	(Note: Season not played due to COVID-19 pandemic)	
2021-22	Cookstown	Instonians
2022-23	Corinthians	UCD
2023-24	Avoca	Pembroke Wanderers
2024-25	Cork Church of Ireland	Cookstown

League Format

Year	Winners	Runners up
2025-26	Portrane	Cork Harlequins

== EY Champions Trophy ==
In addition to introducing a new format, the 2015–16 season also saw the introduction of the EY Champions Trophy. The top three placed teams from the league and/or the winners of the Irish Senior Cup all qualify for the end of season competition. The winners of the EY Champions Trophy qualify to represent Ireland in the Euro Hockey League.

Year	Winners	Score	Runners up
2015-16	Lisnagarvey ^{(1)}	3–1	Banbridge
2016-17	Three Rock Rovers ^{(1)}	2–1	Monkstown
2017-18	Three Rock Rovers ^{(2)}	2–1	Glenanne
2018-19	Three Rock Rovers ^{(3)}	2–0	Lisnagarvey
2019-20	not played		
2020-21	not played		
2021-22	Lisnagarvey ^{(2)}	2–2 (Note: Garvey won shoot-out 3-1)	Banbridge
2022-23	Banbridge ^{(1)}	3–1	Lisnagarvey
2023-24	Banbridge ^{(2)}	2–1	Lisnagarvey
2024-25	Banbridge ^{(3)}	1–1 (Note: Banbridge won shoot-out 4-3)	Lisnagarvey
2025-26	Lisnagarvey^{(3)}	2-2 (Note: Lisnagarvey won shoot-out 3-2)	Banbridge

Notes
