= Glenanne Hockey Club =

Field hockey club in Dublin, Ireland

- Union: Hockey Ireland
- Full name: Glenanne Hockey Club
- Nickname(s): The Glens
- Founded: 1943
- Ground: Glenanne Park; St Mark's Community School; Fortunestown Lane; Tallaght; Dublin 24
- Website: www.glenannehockeyclub.com
- League: Men's Irish Hockey League

Glenanne Hockey Club is a field hockey club based in Dublin 24, South Dublin, Ireland. The club enters teams in the Men's Irish Hockey League, the Irish Senior Cup and the Irish Junior Cup. Glenanne has represented Ireland in European competitions. They won the 2008 EuroHockey Club Trophy and were European Cup Winners' Cup runners up in 2002.

== Club history ==
=== Early years ===
The club was originally the staff sports association of the Brown Thomas department store based on Grafton Street and was originally known as the Graftonians. In 1943 when Graftonians became an open club, the club was reformed as Glenanne Sports Club. In addition to playing field hockey, in its early decades the club also had active table tennis, golf and tennis sections.

=== Golden era ===
Glenanne had to wait until 1985 before their men's section won their first senior trophy, the Neville Cup. In 1996 they won the Leinster Senior Cup for the first time. Glenanne won their first Leinster Division One title in April 2000 which was followed weeks later by their first All-Ireland Club Championship win. This marked the beginning of golden era for the club. During the 2000s they won a further five Leinster Division One titles, three Irish Senior Cups and four Leinster Senior Cups. They also won the 2008 EuroHockey Club Trophy and were European Cup Winners' Cup runners up in 2002. During this era the club's players included Ireland internationals Graham Shaw and Stephen Butler. Towards the end of the decade Glenanne teams also featured Shane O'Donoghue.

=== 75th anniversary ===
In 2018 Glenanne celebrated their 75th anniversary by winning a national double. In 2017–18 they won the Men's Irish Hockey League title for the first time. They secured the title after defeating Lisnagarvey 4–2. Glenanne were 2–0 down before Shane O'Donoghue scored a hat-trick. Meanwhile, Glenanne's men's reserve team also won the Irish Junior Cup after defeating Pembroke Wanderers 3–2 in the final.

=== Glenanne in Europe ===
Glenanne has represented Ireland in Europe on several occasions. After winning the 2001 Irish Senior Cup, they qualified for the 2002 European Cup Winners' Cup hosted in Gibraltar. They reached the final of the tournament and finished as runners up after they were defeated in the final by Atlètic Terrassa. Glenanne won the 2008 EuroHockey Club Trophy in Paris after an defeating the host team, CA Montrouge, in the final after extra-time. They subsequently played in the 2009–10 and the 2010–11 Euro Hockey Leagues.

== Women's section ==
Glenanne has also organised women's field hockey teams. In 1970, following the loss of their original home at Fortfield Road, the original ladies section was disbanded. However, in 1975 it was reformed. The Glenanne women have won the Irish Junior Cup in 1984 and 2008. In the 2008 final they defeated Railway Union 5–1. Prominent Glenanne women's players have included Mary Waldron and Nicola Daly. Waldron was a dual international who played for both the Republic of Ireland women's national football team and the Ireland women's cricket team. Daly was a member of the silver medal winning Ireland squad at the 2018 Women's Hockey World Cup. Another Ireland international, Nikki Symmons, has also coached the women's team.

== Grounds ==
Glenanne were originally based on Fortfield Road in Terenure. The club was named after St. Anne's, a local big house where the club played. The River Poddle also ran near the ground, creating a Glen like appearance. In 1958 the club installed floodlights. They were one of the first field hockey clubs in Ireland to do so. In 1970 the club lost its original grounds after the land was sold for building. Between 1970 and 1985 Tallaght Community School served as the club home. They also used a pitch at Londonbridge Road and a pitch in Templeogue which belonged to the Leinster Branch of the Irish Hockey Union. In 1985 Glenanne began renting the all-weather pitch at St Mark's Community School. The club gradually moved there, eventually abandoning the pitch in Tallaght Community School. In 1989 the club made an arrangement with the trustees of St Mark's Community School and the Department of Education which saw Glenanne lease a site from the school, build Glenanne Park and give the school permission to use the grounds during school time. Glenanne Park was officially opened by the President of Ireland, Mary Robinson on 21 April 1991. In 2001–02 Glenanne Park was upgraded and the arrangement with the school was extended. In 2017–18 the men's senior team began to play their home games at St. Andrew's College. Glenanne is currently undergoing a further pitch replacement programme 2018/2019.

== Notable players ==
=== Men's internationals ===
Ireland

- Joe Brennan
- Stephen Brownlow
- Stephen Butler
- Sam O'Connor
- Shane O'Donoghue
- Gary Shaw
- Graham Shaw
- Richard Shaw

=== Women's internationals ===
Ireland

- Nicola Daly
- Catherine Kennedy
- Colette Kane

=== Others ===
- Mary Waldron, dual international who played for both the Republic of Ireland women's national football team and the Ireland women's cricket team
- Paula Fitzpatrick(born 12 August 1985) is an Irish rugby union player. She was a member of the Irish squad to the 2014 Women's Rugby World Cup.[2] She took on the blindside Flanker role in their historical defeat of the Black Ferns.[3] Glenanne Ladies 1st player.

== Notable coaches ==
- (Ireland) Graham Shaw
- (Ireland) Nikki Symmons

== Honours ==
=== Men ===
- EuroHockey Club Trophy
  - Winners: 2008: 1
- European Cup Winners' Cup
  - Runners Up: 2002: 1
- Men's Irish Hockey League
  - Winners: 2017–18: 1
- All-Ireland Club Championship
  - Winners: 2000: 1 ?
- Irish Senior Cup
  - Winners: 2001, 2007, 2010: 3
  - Runners Up: : 1
- Irish Junior Cup
  - Winners: 1995, 2018: 2
  - Runners Up: 1985, 2006: 2
- Leinster Division One
  - Winners: 2000, 2002, 2006, 2007, 2011, 2012
- Leinster Senior Cup
  - Winners: 1996, 2002, 2004, 2007, 2008: 5

=== Women ===
- Irish Junior Cup
  - Winners: 1984, 2008: 2
