= YMCA Hockey Club =

Irish field hockey team

- Short name: YMCA
- Founded: 1909
- Based in: Dublin, Ireland
- Location: Wesley College Sports Grounds, Balinteer, Dublin, Ireland
- Colors: Black and red
- Head coach: Jason Klinkradt
- Website: Official website

YMCA Hockey Club is a field hockey club based in YMCA Sports Grounds, Claremont Road, Sandymount, Dublin. They are affiliated to the Leinster Branch of the Irish Hockey Association. The club fields five men's teams and two women's teams in the Leinster Hockey leagues. The team played at Wesley College as of 2018.

== Honours ==
(List of honours complete for all-Ireland competitions - all others incomplete)

- Irish Senior Cup (9 wins): 1939–40, 1943–44, 1948–49, 1949–50, 1953–54, 1956–57, 1964–65, 1977–78, 1978–79
- Irish Junior Cup (1 win): 1953–54
- Irish Hockey Challenge (Ladies Hockey) (2 wins): 2008–09, 2009–10
- Leinster Senior League (Men's hockey) (11 wins): 1943–44, 1953–54, 1954–55, 1955–56, 1958–59, 1974–75, 1976–77, 1977–78, 1978–79, 1979–80, 1980–81
