= North Down Hockey Club =

Sporting organisation in Northern Ireland

- Full name: North Down Hockey Club
- League: Ulster Branch of the IHA
- Founded: 1896
- Colors: White & Navy

Personnel
- Coach: Men's Head Coach: Gareth McKeown; Women's Head Coach: Vacant
- Chairman: Sam Pyper (2025-26)
- Website: Official website

North Down Hockey Club is a field hockey club affiliated to the Ulster Branch of Hockey Ireland. The club was founded in 1896.

The Men's and Women's section each field five teams, with both first XI squads competing in the Premier League of the Ulster Senior League. There are also boys' and girls youth teams at under-11, under-13 and under-15 levels, as well as veterans teams and youth indoor teams.

== Grounds ==
North Down Hockey Club is based at the Green in Comber, home of North Down Cricket Club. The first hockey pitch was at the Castle Lane side of the ground on the cricket outfield and this remained the home pitch for the first eleven until the early 1980s. A celebration game against Cliftonville as part of the Centenary in 1996 was played on this same pitch.

The first Council shale pitch in Comber was opened in September 1972 at Park Way in the town and this was followed by the opening of another shale pitch at Enler Park which is now the site of Comber Leisure Centre.

In 1994 the decision was taken to play all first-team games on the artificial turf pitch at Ards Leisure Centre in Newtownards. In 1999, the shale pitch at Comber Leisure Centre was replaced with a sand-based synthetic pitch where the majority of home games are now played. This pitch was replaced in 2010 with a sand-dressed surface. In addition to retaining a match slot at Ards Leisure Centre, North Down also uses the synthetic pitch at Nendrum College in Comber that was opened in 2010.

== Formation ==
The club was formed by members of North Down Cricket Club in 1896 and is one of the founder-members of the Ulster Hockey Union. The first reported Club match in Ulster was played in Comber against Cliftonville on 7 November 1896, with North Down winning 8–0.

In 1899–1900, North Down won its first two trophies. In the only year when the Keightley Cup for the Ulster Senior League was played for on a knock-out basis, Antrim was defeated 3–2 in the final and in the Kirk Cup final Cliftonville were beaten 4–2.

== 1930s successes ==
During the 1930s, North Down won the Ulster Senior League title five times in a six-year period. The Kirk Cup was won twice in 1935-36 and 1936–37.

The 1935–36 season was the zenith for North Down's achievements. J.L.O. Andrews was elected President of the Ulster Branch, and James MacDonald was selected as captain of Ireland for the first time. The club responded to these off-the-field honours by winning the Kirk Cup and the Ulster Senior League and was beaten finalist in the Irish Senior Cup final in Dublin.

== Post-war decline ==
When competitive fixtures resumed after World War II, North Down won the Kirk Cup for the eighth and last time by beating Banbridge 3–1 after two periods of extra time.

The 1950s, however, saw a gradual decline in playing standards and North Down lost its place in the top section of the Ulster Senior League at the end of the 1957–58 season.

== Recent achievements ==
A renewed youth policy in the early 1990s gradually saw a younger age profile for the Men's first eleven. This change in policy eventually led in 1999 to North Down regaining a place in the top section of the Ulster Senior League, after an interlude of 40 years. Two years in the top section ended at the end of the 2000/01 season when North Down, who finished ninth, were placed in the new Senior League One, the top league being renamed as the Premier League and reduced from ten to eight teams.

In the 2008/09 season North Down Men's 1st XI won the first ever Irish Hockey Trophy defeating Antrim 6–5 in the final and also regained promotion back to the Premier League. They followed up on their IHT success during the 2016/17 season with a 3–2 win against South Antrim Hockey Club. Following on from the disruption of the Coronavirus pandemic, the team reached their third IHT final in May 2022, however on this occasion were defeated 2–1 by Queen's University Belfast Men's 1st XI.

2016/17 resulted in the Women's 1st XI suffering relegation from the Ulster Premier League, condemning them to Senior One where they would remain until the 2021/22 season, when a renewed coaching team led by former men's player Richard Glover saw the side only lose one league match to win Senior One and regain Premier League status.

== Notable players ==
- James MacDonald, played 25 times for Ireland including a period as captain.
- Gail Linter (née Stevenson), played 53 times for Ireland between 1991 and 1995.
- Andrew Coates. In the 2007/08 season he became the first player at the club in 52 years to represent Ulster at Senior Level.
- Jamie Orr, represented Ireland at the 2022 European Indoor Hockey Championships in Portugal.

== Honours ==
Men's

- Ulster Senior League
  - 1899–1900, 1931–32, 1932–33, 1934–35, 1935–36, 1936–37.
- Kirk Cup
  - 1899–1900, 1901–02, 1920–21, 1928–29, 1935–36, 1936–37, 1943–44.
  - Shared 1907–08
- Irish Hockey Trophy
  - 2008–09, 2016–17
  - 2021-22 runners-up

Women's

- Ulster Hockey Senior One
  - 2021–22 winners
- Irish Hockey Trophy
  - 2013-14 runners-up

Youth

- BDO Global Ulster U18 Boy's Indoor Hockey Championship
  - 2018–19, 2019–20, 2021-22 (2020–21 season cancelled)

== North Down ladies ==
A ladies' team known as Comber Ladies associated with, but not part of, North Down played from 1898 until 1914. In late 1961, North Down ladies affiliated to the Ulster Women's Hockey Union and played in the Minor Cup towards the end of that first season. The ladies were assimilated into North Down which became, and remains, a joint club without formal men's or ladies' sections. The first eleven reached the top flight of Ulster hockey in 1979 where they remained for some 15 years. The club currently fields 5 women's teams.
