= Mossley Hockey Club =

Field hockey club in Antrim, Northern Ireland

- Full name: Mossley Hockey Club
- Founded: 1929
- Colors: amber, maroon
- Home ground: The Glade

Personnel
- President: Joe Robinson
- Chairman: Trevor Lorimer

Mossley Hockey Club is a field hockey club based in the village of Mossley in Newtownabbey, County Antrim. It was formed in 1929 following a meeting of employees of Henry Campbell's Mill in the village. The club currently fields five men's teams, with the first team playing in the Premier League of the Ulster Senior League.

== History ==
=== Early years ===
The club was formed in 1929 following a meeting of employees of Henry Campbell's Mill in the village.

During the 1930s, the club had some successes in the Intermediate and Junior League. In 1942, the first team won through to the Irish Junior Cup, but were on the receiving end of a 4–0 defeat by Pembroke Wanderers II. Two years later, fortunes were reversed when Mossley won the Irish Junior Cup for the first time with a 3–0 win over Graiguenamanagh.

The First XI were promoted to Qualifying League B and Senior status was attained when that section was won in 1951.

=== 1950s and 1960s ===
The first Senior trophy final was in the Kirk Cup in 1953–54, when defeat was suffered at the hands of Lisnagarvey by 2 goals to one after extra time.

The First XI were beaten in the Ulster Final of the Irish Senior Cup in 1964-65 by Portrush.

In 1966 the Second team won the Irish Junior Cup with a 4–0 win over the Catholic Institute II, Limerick.

The Anderson Cup was won by the First XI in 1966-67 and the following season promotion was gained to the top section of the Ulster Senior League. This position would be held until the end of 2002–03.

=== 1970s to 1990s ===
In 1973, Mossley made a second appearance in the Kirk Cup Final, losing to Lisnagarvey after a replay. In 1983, a third Kirk Cup Final appearance, again against Lisnagarvey was won 2–0.

The Second XI were successful in the 1986 Irish Junior Cup defeating Banbridge Second XI in the Final. The team was captained by David McKinstry, who was also a member of the 1966 Cup winning team.

In 1994, the club won a coaching award in recognition of its work with young players.

== Grounds ==
The original grass pitches at Mossley were abandoned in 1976 and the club played home games at the City of Belfast Playing Fields at Mallusk. The present site at The Glade was purchased in 1984, and in 1991 the club installed a synthetic surface. In 2004 the original artificial surface was replaced with a water based pitch.

== Notable players ==
=== Men's internationals ===
Ireland

In 1952 Bryan Gilroy became the first Mossley player to represent Ireland.

Other former internationals include:

- Harold Burns Jnr
- Paul Cooke
- Bryan Gilroy
- David Gordon
- John Jackson
- Richard Willis
- Simon Todd

== Honours ==
- Kirk Cup (1) 1983-84
- Anderson Cup 1966–67, 1988–89, 2013-2014
- Irish Junior Cup (3) 1943–44, 1965–66, 1985–86
