= Kirk Cup =

Irish field hockey tournament

The Kirk Cup is the oldest hockey tournament in Ulster and the oldest provincial hockey trophy in Ireland. It has become a tradition since the 1966–67 season for the final to be played on Boxing Day, a date previously reserved for the Anderson Cup Final. The final attracts the largest crowd of the Ulster hockey season. The cup is named after its donor, Mr. John Kirk, J.P, who was a member of the Antrim club. Following the creation of the Irish Hockey League, the competition remained open only to Ulster Senior League members, until 2018–19, when Irish Hockey League teams from Ulster were admitted.

In the early years of the competition it was also known as the Ulster Senior Challenge Cup.

== Historical format ==
From the introduction of the Cup in the 1897–98 season until the major re-organisation of the Ulster Senior League for the 1969–70 season, the format was that of a knockout competition. The Cup was competed for towards the end of the season.

From the 1969-70 all the teams in Senior League Section One and Two were split into four groups. The winner of each group would go forward to an open draw for semi-final matches.

From the 2000-01 until the 2008–09 season, the format of the competition was altered slightly. The eight teams in the Ulster Premier Hockey League were drawn into four groups. The top eight teams from Section One were drawn into these groups to create four groups of four teams each. The eight Section One teams were the relegated Premier League team from the previous season and the teams finishing in second to eighth places in the final league standings of the previous season.

Each club played the other teams in their Group once. The winners of each Group proceed to semi-final matches, with the ties decided via an open draw.

The Premier League reverted to ten teams for the 2009–10 season and these teams together with the top six teams in Section One were drawn into four groups of four teams. Each team played the other teams in their group once. The group winners contested the semi-final with the ties decided by an open draw. The two semi-final winners contested the final which is scheduled for Boxing Day. This format was used in 2010-11 too.

== Current format ==
For the start of the 2011–12 season the entry was restricted to the Premier League teams. The ten Premier League teams were drawn in two pools of five teams, with each team playing the other teams in their pool once. The semi-finals saw the winner of one pool playing the runner-up of the other pool, with the winners of the semi-finals going on to contest the final. In 2016–17, the top sixteen teams in the Ulster Senior League were drawn into four groups of four, but since 2017-18 it has reverted to two groups of five.

== Finals ==
(records incomplete)

=== 1890s ===
Year	Winner			Runner-up	Notes
1897–98	North Staffordshire Regiment	3	2	Antrim	
1898–99	Antrim	3	1	King's Own Liverpool Regiment	

=== 1900s ===
Year	Winner			Runner-up	Notes
1899–1900	North Down	4	2	Cliftonville	
1900–01	Antrim	3	1	Banbridge	
1901–02	North Down	2	1	Cliftonville	
1902–03	Strabane	1	0	North Down	
1903–04	Cliftonville	1	0	Banbridge	
1904–05	Antrim	2	1	Banbridge	after extra time
1905–06	Banbridge	1	0	Malone	
1906–07	Antrim	3	1	Downpatrick	
1907–08	Malone & North Down			SHARED	
1908–09	Banbridge	5	2	Malone	

=== 1910s ===
Year	Winner			Runner-up	Notes
1909–10	Banbridge	3	0	Malone	
1910–11	Banbridge	3	2	Queen's University	
1911–12	Cliftonville	2	1	North Down	
1912–13	Banbridge	3	1	Queen's University	
1913–14	Banbridge	2	0	Queen's University	
1914–05	Not played due to World War I				
1915–16	Not played due to World War I				
1916–17	Not played due to World War I				
1917–18	Not played due to World War I				
1918–19	Not played due to World War I				

=== 1920s ===
Year	Winner			Runner-up	Notes
1919–20	Banbridge	4	1	Queen's University	
1920–21	North Down	1	0	Banbridge	
1921–22	South Antrim	2	1	Banbridge	
1922–23	Lisnagarvey	3	0	North Down	
1923–24	Lisnagarvey	2	0	Cliftonville	
1924–25	Lisnagarvey	1	0	East Antrim	
1925–26	Banbridge	2	1	Antrim	
1926–27	Banbridge	3	0	East Antrim	
1927–28	Antrim	1	0	East Antrim	
1928–29	North Down	2	1	South Antrim	after extra time

=== 1930s ===
Year	Winner			Runner-up	Notes
1929–30	Cliftonville	3	0	Derry YMCA	
1930–31	Cliftonville	4	1	Derry YMCA	
1931–32	South Antrim	2	0	East Antrim	
1932–33	East Antrim	2	0	Banbridge	
1933–34	Lisnagarvey	5	4	Cliftonville	
1934–35	Banbridge	1	0	North Down	
1935–36	North Down	2	0	Wanderers	after extra time
1936–37	North Down	3	1	Lisnagarvey	after extra time
1937–38	Banbridge	3	1	North Down	after extra time
1938–39	Lisnagarvey	2	1	Antrim	

=== 1940s ===
Year	Winner			Runner-up	Notes
1939–40	Not Played due to World War II				
1940–41	Not Played due to World War II				
1941–42	Lisnagarvey	2	1	North Down	
1942–43	Lisnagarvey	2	0	Banbridge	
1943–44	North Down	3	1	Banbridge	after two periods of extra time
1944–45	Lisnagarvey	2	1	Short & Harland	
1945–46	Lisnagarvey	2	1	Wanderers	
1946–47	Portrush	1	0	Banbridge	
1947–48	Lisnagarvey	2	1	Belfast YMCA	
1948–49	Portrush	3	1	Lisnagarvey	

=== 1950s ===
Year	Winner			Runner-up	Notes
1949–50	Banbridge	2	0	Antrim	
1950–51	Banbridge			Parkview	
1951–52					
1952–53	Lisnagarvey				
1953–54	Lisnagarvey	2	1	Mossley	after extra time
1954–55					
1955–56	Parkview & Lisnagarvey			SHARED	
1956–57	Banbridge				
1957–58	Belfast YMCA			Banbridge	
1958–59	Belfast YMCA			Antrim	

=== 1960s ===
Year	Winner			Runner-up	Notes
1959–60	Belfast YMCA	1	0	Portrush	
1960–61	Lisnagarvey	2	1	Banbridge	
1961–62	Lisnagarvey	2	0	Banbridge	
1962–63	Competition abandoned due to severe winter weather				
1963–64	Lisnagarvey	2	0	Antrim	
1964–65	Portrush	4	2	Banbridge	AET – Replay – Game 1: 2-2
1965–66	Antrim	1	0	Lisnagarvey	
1966–67	Parkview	2	1	Banbridge	
1967–68	Cliftonville	3	0	Antrim	
1968–69	Cliftonville	1	0	Instonians	

=== 1970s ===
Year	Winner			Runner-up	Notes
1969–70	Portrush	3	1	Instonians	
1970–71	Lisnagarvey			Cliftonville	Replay – Game 1: 1-1
1971–72	Antrim & Instonians			SHARED	2nd replay – Game 1: 2-2, Game 2:
1972–73	Lisnagarvey	1	0	Friends School Old Boys	
1973–74	Lisnagarvey	3	0	Mossley	Replay – Game 1: 1-1
1974–75	Instonians	2	1	Lisnagarvey	
1975–76	Instonians	2	1	Cliftonville	
1976–77	Belfast YMCA	2	0	Instonians	
1977–78	Lisnagarvey	2	0	Belfast YMCA	
1978–79	Belfast YMCA	3	0	Antrim	

=== 1980s ===
Year	Winner			Runner-up	Notes
1979–80	Lisnagarvey			Instonians	Replay – Game 1: 1-1
1980–81	Instonians	3	1	Banbridge	
1981–82	Lisnagarvey	1	1	Banbridge	Replay – Lisnagarvey won 4–2 on penalty strokes – Game 1: 2-2
1982–83	Banbridge	2	1	Belfast YMCA	
1983–84	Mossley	2	0	Lisnagarvey	
1984–85	Belfast YMCA	3	0	Lisnagarvey	
1985–86	Banbridge	2	1	RUC	
1986–87	Banbridge	2	0	Cookstown	Replay – Game 1: 1-1
1987–88	Banbridge	2	1	Mossley	Replay – Game 1: 1-1
1988–89	Cookstown	1	0	Mossley	

=== 1990s ===
Year	Winner			Runner-up	Notes
1989–90	Lisnagarvey	2	0	Banbridge	
1990–91	Holywood 87	2	1	Lisnagarvey	Replay – Game 1: 2-2
1991–92	Holywood 87	1	0	Lisnagarvey	
1992–93	Holywood 87	2	0	Instonians	
1993–94	Instonians	3	1	Banbridge	
1994–95	Lisnagarvey	2	1	Instonians	
1995–96	Lisnagarvey	2	0	Newry	
1996–97	Lisnagarvey	3	2	Instonians	
1997–98	Lisnagarvey	2	0	Annadale	
1998–99	Lisnagarvey	2	1	Cookstown	

=== 2000s ===
Year	Winner			Runner-up	Notes
1999–2000	Annadale	1	1	Lisnagarvey	after extra time – Annadale won 3–1 on penalty strokes
2000–01	Lisnagarvey	2	1	Annadale	
2001–02	Lisnagarvey	2	1	Instonians	
2002–03	Cookstown	2	1	Instonians	
2003–04	Annadale	2	1	Banbridge	Annadale won with "Golden Goal" in 7th minute of extra time
2004–05	Instonians	2	2	Lisnagarvey	Instonians won 5–4 on penalty strokes
2005–06	Banbridge	2	1	Annadale	
2006–07	Cookstown	2	1	Lisnagarvey	
2007–08	Annadale	3	2	Lisnagarvey	
2008–09	Cookstown	4	3	Lisnagarvey	after extra time

=== 2010s ===
Year	Winner			Runner-up	Notes
2009–10	Cookstown	2	0	Banbridge	
2010–11	Banbridge	4	2	Cookstown	
2011–12	Lisnagarvey	2	1	Cookstown	
2012–13	Cookstown	3	1	Lisnagarvey	
2013–14	Annadale	1	1	Lisnagarvey	after extra time – Annadale win 4–2 on penalty strokes
2014–15	Banbridge	3	1	Cookstown	
2015–16	Instonians	8	2	Mossley	
2016–17	Annadale	8	1	Cookstown	
2017–18	Kilkeel	1	1	Mossley	Kilkeel win 3–2 on penalties.
2018–19	Banbridge	4	1	Annadale	

=== 2020s ===
Year	Winner			Runner-up	Notes
2019–20	Banbridge	3	2	Lisnagarvey	
2020–21	Not played due to Covid-19				
2021–22	Lisnagarvey	3	2	Banbridge	
2022–23	Lisnagarvey	2	2	Banbridge	Garvey won on penalty run-ins
2023–24	Lisnagarvey	2	0	Banbridge	
2024–25	Lisnagarvey	5	0	Cookstown	
