= Queen's University Hockey Club =

- Union: Ulster Branch of the IHA
- Founded: 1898
- Region: Belfast, Northern Ireland
- Chairman: Joaquim Novaes

Queen's University Hockey Club Men's Section was formed at Queen's in the latter part of the nineteenth century. The Belfast News Letter reported the Ulster Hockey Union AGM of 19 September 1808 and recorded that "a committee meeting was held afterwards when Queen's College Hockey Club was admitted to membership." Queen's was known as a 'College' until it was granted its charter as a university in 1908.

Members are given a "year's grace" in their playing career, to allow them to play one more season after they have left academic study at the university. In 2016–17 the first team plays in Section 1 of the Ulster Senior League.

== Past ==
In 1911-12 Queen's University were the first club from Ulster to win the Irish Senior Cup on the field of play - Banbridge were awarded the Cup in 1907 when their opponents refused to travel to Ulster to play a Replay. The club won the Irish Senior Cup in 1972 for the second time in its history. The Irish Senior Cup was won again in 1981 when the team was captained by Peter McCabe, later of Lisnagarvey and included future Great Britain Olympic Gold Medal Winner Jimmy Kirkwood.

== Playing Strength ==
The Club lives from year to year, with fortunes tied to the abilities of the new undergraduate intake each year. Sides vary from being 'useful' to 'formidable', the latter was demonstrated by the 1972 team which beat Monkstown 3-0 in the Irish Senior Cup Final. This side included Great Britain and Ireland International Terry Gregg and several other players that went on to gain International recognition.

== Present ==
Recently the team has had some significant success, winning the Ulster and Ireland Indoor hockey championships in 2015, therefore gaining qualification to Europe in 2016. With the backing of the university the club were able to send a squad to Bulgaria, who got the opportunities to test themselves against some top level players. Outdoors the 2nd XI won Ulster Junior league 3 in 2014 by an emphatic 12 point margin. Another recent success was winning the UK mixed hockey championship in Blackpool in 2014, finishing top of a 25 team league to go on to win a dramatic play off final on a 1 v 1 shoot out. Being awarded the Queen's SU Sports Club of the Year and Ulster hockey club of year in 2016 boosted the club considerably. Currently the team are playing in the Senior 1 division of Men's hockey in Ulster and are hoping to improve on a disappointing 2nd position last season.

== Future ==
The future of the club is only as good as the players that are eligible to play for the club, some seasons the club struggles to field a 2nd XI, others it could push for a 3rd XI. However, as long as the commitment and excellent facilities at Upper Malone continue to be taken forward, there should be a future for Queens University Hockey Club.

== Honours ==
- Irish Senior Cup (3 wins)
  - 1911-12, 1971–72, 1980-81.
- Anderson Cup
  - 1935-36, 1941–42, 1956-57.
- Linden Cup
  - 2005-06, 2006–07

Irish Indoor cup 2014-15

Ulster indoor cup 2014-2015

Ulster Premier League 2022-2023
