= 1981 EuroHockey Club Champions Cup =

Eighth edition of Europe's premier field hockey club

The 1981 EuroHockey Club Champions Cup, taking place in Brussels, was the eighth edition of Europe's premier field hockey club competition. It was the first edition were two divisions were established. Otherwise, the competition format established in 1977 was preserved.

It was won by HC Klein Zwitserland in a final match against SKA Sverdlovsk, which was the revelation of the competition considering Soviet hockey, represented by Dynamo Almaty, had failed to rank among the top 8 clubs in previous editions. It was the Dutch club's 2nd European Champions Cup trophy. Barcelona's Real Club de Polo attained the 3rd place by defeating defending champions Slough HC.

== EuroHockey Club Champions Cup ==
1981 Men's EuroHockey Club Champions Cup
Tournament details
- Host country: Belgium
- City: Brussels
- Dates: May 1982
- Teams: 8 (from 8 associations)

Final positions
- Champions: (Netherlands) Klein Zwitserland (2nd title)
- Runner-up: (Soviet Union) SKA-Sverdlovsk
- Third place: (Spain) Real Club de Polo

Tournament statistics
- Matches played: 16
- Goals scored: 62 (3.88 per match)

=== Teams ===
- (Scotland) Edinburgh
- (France) FC Lyon
- (Netherlands) Klein Zwitserland
- (Spain) Real Club de Polo
- (Soviet Union) SKA-Sverdlovsk
- (England) Slough
- (West Germany) TG Frankenthal
- (Belgium) Uccle Sport

=== Preliminary round ===
==== Pool A ====
Pos	Team	Pld	W	D	L	GF	GA	GD	Pts	Qualification or relegation
1	(Soviet Union) SKA-Sverdlovsk	3	2	1	0	7	3	+4	5	Advance to final
2	(England) Slough	3	1	1	1	7	5	+2	3	Advance to third place match
3	(West Germany) TG Frankenthal	3	0	2	1	4	5	−1	2	Advance to fifth place match
4	(France) FC Lyon (R)	3	1	0	2	5	10	−5	2	Relegation to Trophy

Source: EHF
(R) Relegated

May 1981

TG Frankenthal (West Germany)	2–2	(Soviet Union) SKA-Sverdlovsk

May 1981

Slough (England)	6–2	(France) FC Lyon

May 1981

FC Lyon (France)	2–1	(West Germany) TG Frankenthal

May 1981

SKA-Sverdlovsk (Soviet Union)	2–0	(England) Slough

May 1981

SKA-Sverdlovsk (Soviet Union)	3–1	(France) FC Lyon

May 1981

TG Frankenthal (West Germany)	1–1	(England) Slough

==== Pool B ====
Pos	Team	Pld	W	D	L	GF	GA	GD	Pts	Qualification or relegation
1	(Netherlands) Klein Zwitserland	3	2	1	0	9	2	+7	5	Advance to final
2	(Spain) Real Club de Polo	3	2	1	0	9	3	+6	5	Advance to third place match
3	(Belgium) Uccle Sport (H)	3	1	0	2	3	7	−4	2	Advance to fifth place match
4	(Scotland) Edinburgh (R)	3	0	0	3	2	11	−9	0	Relegation to Trophy

Source: EHF
(H) Hosts; (R) Relegated

May 1981

Klein Zwitserland (Netherlands)	4–1	(Scotland) Edinburgh

May 1981

Real Club de Polo (Spain)	3–1	(Belgium) Uccle Sport

May 1981

Klein Zwitserland (Netherlands)	1–1	(Spain) Real Club de Polo

May 1981

Uccle Sport (Belgium)	2–0	(Scotland) Edinburgh

May 1981

Real Club de Polo (Spain)	5–1	(Scotland) Edinburgh

May 1981

Klein Zwitserland (Netherlands)	4–0	(Belgium) Uccle Sport

=== Classification round ===
==== Seventh and eighth place ====
May 1981

FC Lyon (France)	2–3	(Scotland) Edinburgh

==== Fifth and sixth place ====
May 1981

TG Frankenthal (West Germany)	0–0 (a.e.t.)	(Belgium) Uccle Sport
Penalties
	8–7

==== Third and fourth place ====
May 1981

Slough (England)	2–5	(Spain) Real Club de Polo

==== Final ====
May 1981

SKA-Sverdlovsk (Soviet Union)	0–4	(Netherlands) Klein Zwitserland

== EuroHockey Club Trophy ==
EuroHockey Club Trophy in Rome.

=== Group stage ===
==== Group A ====
1. (Ireland) Cookstown HC - 5 points
2. (Poland) Warta Poznań - 4 points
3. (Gibraltar) Rock Gunners - 3 points
4. (Switzerland) HC Olten - 0 points

==== Group B ====
1. (Italy) HC EUR Algida - 5 points
2. (Austria) SV Arminen Vienna - 3 points
3. (Socialist Federal Republic of Yugoslavia) HK Jedinstvo - 3 points
4. (Wales) Withchurch HC - 1 point

=== Play-offs ===
==== 1st place ====
- Cookstown HC 1-1 HC EUR Algida (penalty shoot-out: 5-2)

==== 3rd place ====
- SV Arminen Vienna 2-1 Warta Poznań

==== 5th place ====
- HK Jedinstvo 3-2 Rock Gunners

==== 7th place ====
- Withchurch HC 3-2 HC Olten

==== Standings ====
1. (Ireland) Cookstown HC
2. (Italy) HC EUR Algida
3. (Austria) SV Arminen Vienna
4. (Poland) Warta Poznań
5. (Socialist Federal Republic of Yugoslavia) HK Jedinstvo
6. (Gibraltar) Rock Gunners
7. (Wales) Withchurch HC
8. (Switzerland) HC Olten
- Ireland and Italy are promoted to 1st Division for the 1982 Champions Cup.

== See also ==
- European Hockey Federation
