= Clontarf Hockey Club =

Hockey club in Ireland

- Location: Mount Temple, Malahide Road, Dublin 3, Ireland
- President: J. Turner
- Captain: S. Sterritt
- Website: Official website

Clontarf Hockey Club (Club Haca Chluain Tarbh in Irish) is a hockey club based on the Malahide Road, Dublin 3, Ireland. The club is affiliated to the Leinster Branch of the Irish Hockey Association. Clontarf fields teams in the Men's Second, Fourth and Seventh Divisions and the Ladies' Second, Fifth, Seventh, Ninth and Eleventh Divisions.
