= Avoca Hockey Club =

Field hockey club in County Dublin, Ireland

- Union: Hockey Ireland
- Full name: Avoca Hockey Club
- Founded: 1895
- Ground: Newpark Comprehensive School; Newtown Park Avenue; Blackrock; Dún Laoghaire–Rathdown; Ireland; 53.288844°N 6.171961°W
- Website: avocahockeyclub.com

Avoca Hockey Club (Irish: Cumann Haca Abhóca) is a field hockey club based at Newpark Comprehensive School in Blackrock, Dublin. The club was originally founded in 1895 and a women's team was added in 1973. Avoca enters various men's and women's teams in junior, senior and veterans leagues and cup competitions affiliated to the Leinster Hockey Association. Avoca men have won both the Men's Irish Senior Cup and the Men's Irish Junior Cup. Avoca Women won the Irish Hockey Trophy in 2022. The club has also represented Ireland in European competitions, finishing third in the 1993 EuroHockey Club Trophy.

== History ==
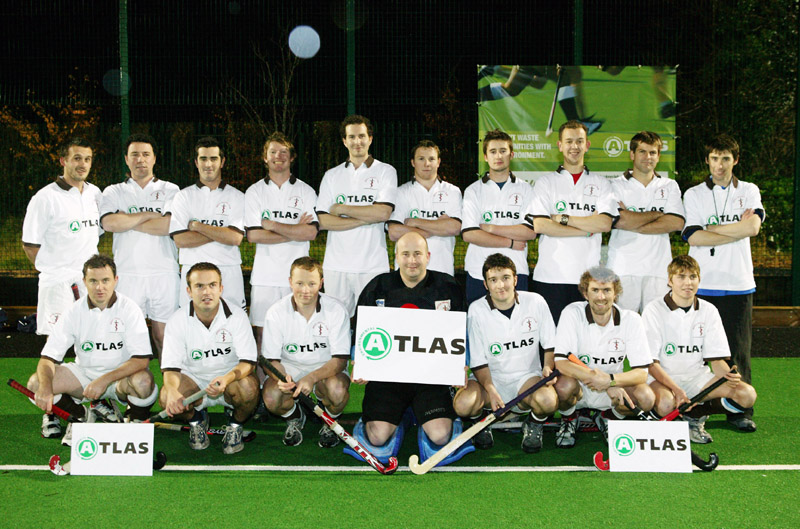
Men's Firsts 2005–06 Leinster League First Division

Avoca Hockey Club was originally formed in 1895 by past and current students at Avoca School. In 1897 the club won its first national trophy when the second team won the Irish Junior Cup. The modern club was re-formed in 1929. When Avoca School amalgamated with Kingstown Grammar School in 1973 to become Newpark Comprehensive School, the field hockey club retained the Avoca name. In 1996 Avoca celebrated its centenary season by winning the Irish Senior Cup for the first time.

Men's Irish Senior Cup

Season	Winners	Score	Runners up
1983	Belfast YMCA	2–1	Avoca
1985	Belfast YMCA	2–1	Avoca
1989	Lisnagarvey	1–0	Avoca
1993	Lisnagarvey	1–0	Avoca
1996	Avoca	3–2 (Note: After replay and two periods of extra time. First game finished 2–2.)	Lisnagarvey

Notes

Men's Irish Junior Cup

Season	Winners	Score	Runners up
1897	Avoca II		
1965	Avoca II	6–0	Deighton Wanderers
1997	Avoca II	2–0	Cork Harlequins II

== Home grounds ==
The club has played at the Avoca School/Newpark Comprehensive School site since 1936. The club also shares an astroturf pitch with Dominican College Sion Hill and rents a pitch at Loreto College, Foxrock.

== Notable players ==
=== Men's internationals ===
Ireland

When Ireland won the silver medal at the 1908 Summer Olympics, the squad included two former Avoca players, Jack Peterson and his brother Walter Peterson. Jack and Walter's four brothers – Cecil, Herbert, Nicholas and William – also played for Avoca and Ireland.

- Cecil Peterson
- Herbert Peterson
- Jack Peterson
- Nicholas Peterson
- Walter Peterson
- William Peterson

- R. F. Leitch (field hockey)
- D. Coulson (field hockey) Irish Captain
- Jonathan Cole (field hockey) Irish Captain
- David Richardson (field hockey)
- Simon Filgas (field hockey)
- Mark Cullen (field hockey)
- Johnny Watterson (field hockey)
- Peter Agnew (field hockey)
- Nigel Kingston (field hockey)
- Anton Scott (field hockey)
- Orla Bell (field hockey)
- Fion Breheny (field hockey)
- Carolyn Shankey (field hockey)
- Galahad Goulet (field hockey)
- Brian Long (field hockey)
- Liam Canning (indoor hockey)
- Colin Hade (field hockey)
- Peter Darley (field hockey)
- Robert Ryan (field hockey)
- Philip Shier (Indoor hockey)
- Jakim Berndsen (Indoor Hockey)

== Notable coaches ==
- David Judge

== Honours ==
=== Men ===
- Irish Senior Cup
  - Winners: 1995–96: 1
  - Runners Up: 1983, 1985, 1989, 1993: 4
- Irish Junior Cup
  - Winners: 1896–97, 1964–65, 1996–97: 3
- British and Irish Club Championship
  - Winners: 1984: 1
- Irish Club Champions
  - Winners 1991-92, 1992-93:
- Irish Indoor Club Champions
  - Winners 1990:
