= Men's Irish Junior Cup (field hockey) =

The logo of the Irish Hockey Association.

The Men's Irish Junior Cup is a knockout trophy played for field hockey clubs in Ireland. Entry is open to sides that do not qualify for the Irish Senior Cup and to the second teams of clubs that play in the Irish Senior Cup. The trophy was first played for in 1895, a year after the Senior version of the trophy.

== Historical format ==
From its start in 1895 until the 1980s, the tournament was played in regional tournaments. The winners of the regional tournaments in Leinster, Munster, Ulster and at times Connacht would proceed through to semi-final matches. The finals were played in one weekend until 1935. The final was then moved to a separate weekend. The change was prompted by the circumstances of the 1934 finals. Castlecomer played the semi-final against Cork Harlequins (with extra time) on the Friday afternoon and a semi-final replay (with more extra time) on the Saturday morning. After winning the marathon semi-final, the exhaustion of the Castlecomer team forced them to scratch from the Final that was due to be played on the Saturday afternoon.

== Current format ==
In the 1980s the format of the competition was changed when the last eight teams from the regions entered an open draw. After a few years of operating this system the competition was changed to a completely open draw.

The introduction of the Irish Trophy in 2008-09 meant that entry to the Irish Junior Cup was restricted to club's second teams. A small number of third eleven teams also qualify.

Both teams are allowed a squad of 18 as long as you have two fully kitted goalkeepers and there is no extra time, a drawn match will be finalised with penalty strokes.

The Irish Junior Cup Trophy is the only trophy in Ireland where the Captain's name is engraved as well as the team's name and year.

== Finals ==
(Records are incomplete)

=== 1890s ===
- 1895 Beechfield
- 1896 Sandyford
- 1897 Avoca
- 1898 Three Rock Rovers II
- 1899 Dublin University II

=== 1900s ===
- 1900 Corinthians II 2-1 Antrim II
- 1901 Dublin University II beat Antrim II
- 1902 Dublin University II
- 1903 Dublin University II
- 1904 Kingston GS
- 1905 Naas
- 1906 Monkstown II 5–0 (Note: After replay. First game finished 2–2 after extra time.) Lisnagarvey
- 1907 Dublin University II
- 1908 Monkstown II
- 1909 Monkstown II 3-0 Whitehead

=== 1910s ===
Year	Winner	Runner-up	Notes
1910	Three Rock Rovers 2XI		
1911	Dublin University 2XI	East Antrim	
1912	Three Rock Rovers 2XI		
1913	Dublin University 2XI		
1914	Ballinasloe	Dublin University II	
1915	Not Played		
1916	Not Played		
1917	Not Played		
1918	Not Played		
1919	Not Played		

=== 1920s ===
Year	Winner			Runner-up	Notes
1920	Three Rock Rovers II				
1921	Dublin University II				
1922	Waterford	2	1	Dublin University II	
1923	College of Science	2	1	Ards	
1924	Maryborough	3	2	East Antrim II	after extra time
1925	Railway Union II	2	0	Ennis	
1926	Pembroke Wanderers II	1	0	Athlone	after four periods of extra time
1927	Killyleagh	2	0	Maryborough	
1928	Ards	3	1	Portrane	
1929	Banbridge II	1	0	Naas	

=== 1930s ===
Year	Winner			Runner-up	Notes
1930	Naas	6	0	Cork Harlequins	
1931	Old Grammarians (Cork)	2	1	Kingstown GS II	
1932	Portrush	3	2	Portrane	after 2 periods of extra time
1933	Portrane	4	0	Castlecomer	
1934	Portrane	W	O	Castlecomer	walkover
1935	Newry	2	0	Corinthians II	
1936	Newry	2	0	Athlunkard, Limerick	
1937	Parkview	3	0	Portrane	
1938	Pembroke Wanderers II				
1939	Maryborough	2	1	Down County Mental Hospital	after 2 periods of extra time

=== 1940s ===
Year	Winner			Runner-up	Notes
1940	Maryborough			Railway Union II	
1941	Maryborough	2	0	Dublin University II	
1942	Pembroke Wanderers II	4	0	Mossley	
1943	Portrush	3	0	Graiguenamanagh	
1944	Mossley	3	0	Graiguenamanagh	
1945	Down	2	1	Graiguenamanagh	
1946	Portrush	2	1	Monkstown II	
1947	Antrim II	2	1	Roscrea	
1948	Antrim II	3	2	Pembroke Wanderers II	
1949	Banbridge II	1	0	Pembroke Wanderers II	

=== 1950s ===
Year	Winner			Runner-up	Notes
1950	Glenanne II	2	1	RUC	
1951	Monkstown II				
1952	RUC	2	1	Monkstown II	
1953	Banbridge II	1	0	Carlow	
1954	Dublin YMCA II	2	1	Lisnagarvey II	After extra time
1955	Lisnagarvey II	4	0	University College, Dublin	
1956	Lisnagarvey II	1	0	North Kildare	
1957	Railway Union II			Carlow	
1958	Lisnagarvey II	1	0	Dublin YMCA II	
1959	Lisnagarvey II	3	0	Dublin University II	

=== 1960s ===
Year	Winner			Runner-up	Notes
1960	Lisnagarvey II	2	0	Dublin University II	Replay - Game 1: 3-3
1961	Pembroke Wanderers II	2	0	Catholic Institute II	
1962	Lisnagarvey II	4	1	Waterford Y.M.C.A.	
1963	Lisnagarvey II	2	0	Éire Air Corp	After extra time in replay - Game 1: 1-1
1964	Cliftonville II	3	2	Three Rock Rovers II	
1965	Avoca II	6	0	Deighton Wanderers	
1966	Mossley II	4	1	Catholic Institute II	
1967	Lisnagarvey II	1	0	Railway Union II	
1968	Cork Church of Ireland II			Monkstown II	
1969	Monkstown II			Belvedere II	

=== 1970s ===
Year	Winner			Runner-up	Notes
1970	Lisnagarvey II	1	0	Pembroke Wanderers II	Replay - Game 1: 0-0
1971	Lorraine	2	0	Cork Church of Ireland II	
1972	Lisnagarvey II	3	0	Deighton Wanderers	
1973	Lisnagarvey II	4	0	Waterford II	
1974	Lisnagarvey II	4	0	St Brendan's	
1975	Railway Union II	3	1	Lisnagarvey II	after extra time
1976	Antrim II	2	1	Limerick PYMA II	
1977	Lisnagarvey II	3	1	Three Rock Rovers II	
1978	Instonians II	2	1	Cork Church of Ireland II	
1979	Three Rock Rovers II	3	2	Cork Harlequins II	

=== 1980s ===
Year	Winner			Runner-up	Notes
1980	Instonians II	1	0	Cookstown II	
1981	Belfast YMCA II	2	0	Instonians II	after extra time
1982	Newry	4	3	Monkstown II	
1983	Cookstown II	3	1	Three Rock Rovers III	
1984	Cork Church of Ireland II				
1985	Cookstown II	2	1	Glennane	
1986	Mossley II	2	0	Banbridge II	
1987	Lisnagarvey II				
1988	Aer Lingus	2	0	Cork Harlequins II	
1989	Banbridge II	3	0	Lisnagarvey III	

=== 1990s ===
Year	Winner			Runner-up	Notes
1990	Lisnagarvey II	1	0	Holywood '87 II	Replay - Game 1: 2-2
1991	Holywood '87 II	1	0	Cork Harlequins II	
1992	Holywood '87 II	1	0	Banbridge II	
1993	Cork Church of Ireland II	2	1	Lisnagarvey II	
1994	Banbridge II	4	0	Pembroke Wanderers II	
1995	Glennane II	4	2	Banbridge II	
1996	Pembroke Wanderers II	1	0	Banbridge II	
1997	Avoca II	2	0	Cork Harlequins II	
1998	Three Rock Rovers II	4	0	Annadale II	
1999	Cork Harlequins II	5	4	Lisnagarvey II	

=== 2000s ===
Year	Winner			Runner-up	Notes
2000	Annadale II	3	0	Three Rock Rovers II	
2001	Pembroke Wanderers II	2	1	Lisnagarvey II	
2002	Annadale II	2	1	Pembroke Wanderers II	
2003	Lisnagarvey II	5	0	Kilkenny (Kilkenny)	
2004	Annadale II	4	3	Lisnagarvey II	
2005	Banbridge II	2	1	Cork Harlequins II	
2006	Annadale II	2	1	Glenanne II	
2007	Pembroke Wanderers II	3	1	Cork Harlequins II	Captain - Douglas Good
2008	Pembroke Wanderers II	3	2	Annadale II	Captain - Douglas Good
2009	Cork Church of Ireland II	5	1	Pembroke Wanderers II	

=== 2010s ===
Year	Winner			Runner-up	Notes
2010	Monkstown II	3	1	YMCA II	Captain - Donal O Mearain
2011	Lisnagarvey II	3	1	Banbridge II	
2012	Corinthians II	3	1	Cookstown II	Captain Adrian Missen
2013	Monkstown II	2	1	Banbridge II	Captain - Daniel Poff
2014	Pembroke Wanderers II			Monkstown II	Captain - Craig Wilson
2015	Monkstown II	6	2	Three Rock Rovers II	Captain - Robert Mason
2016	Cork Church of Ireland II	2	0	Monkstown II	
2017	Cork Church of Ireland II	3	1	Three Rock Rovers II	
2018	Glenanne II	3	2	Pembroke Wanderers II	
2019	Three Rock Rovers II	4	1	Instonians II	Captain - Luke McSharry

=== 2020s ===
Year	Winner			Runner-up	Notes
2020	Corinthians II	1	0	Lisnagarvey II	Captain -Gareth Davis
2021					
2022	Cookstown				
2023	Lisnagarvey II	2*	2	Banbridge II	Captain- James Ritchie *Lisnagarvey won on run ins
2024	Corinthians II	3*	3	Lisnagarvey II	Captain - Ciarán O'Shea *Corinthians won on run ins
2025	Three Rock Rovers II	3	0	Portrane II	Captain -Mikey Maguire
2026	Lisnagarvey II	3	2	Corinthians II	Captain - Daniel Murray
