= Annadale Hockey Club =

Field hockey club based in Belfast

- Full name: Annadale Hockey Club
- League: Men's Irish Hockey League; Ulster Senior League
- Founded: 1968
- Colors: Home: White, black and red Alternate: Black, black and black
- Home ground: Strathearn School / Campbell College

Personnel
- Coach: Richard Fairman
- Chairman: John Stephens

Affiliation
- Conference: Ulster Branch of the IHA
- Website: annadale.co.uk

Annadale Hockey Club is a field hockey club based in Belfast playing all home games at Lagan College.

== Formation ==
The club started life as Annadale Grammar School Former Pupils in 1968. While it became an open club, the connection with Annadale Grammar School, now Wellington College, remained strong. Coaching continues and the school playing facilities are still used by junior teams.

== Current Kit ==
The current kit is manufactured by BLK and displays the logos of all the club's sponsors across the shirt and shorts. Current sponsors are Motis Ireland, Burger King, Rich Sauces, Tayto, Lowe, Johnston Kennedy DFK.

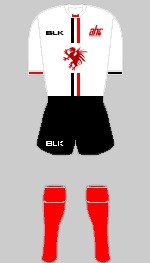
Current Home Kit

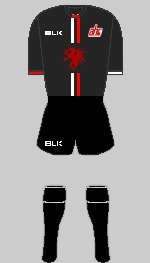
Current Away Kit

== Early ascent ==
The club rose through the league structure, gaining promotion to senior status following its Intermediate League win in 1970–71. Senior League 1 was attained for the first time after Section 2 was won in the 1975–76 season.

In 1977, the club lost in the Ulster Section final of the Irish Senior Cup. Consolation came in the form of the club's first senior trophy when the Anderson Cup was won in that same season.

== 1980s consolidation ==
The club's initial spell in the top section of the Ulster Senior League lasted five years. There followed a period when Annadale bounced between Section 1 and Section 2. The 1984–85 season saw Annadale win promotion to the top section again, a status that has been held ever since.

During this period the club reached the final of the Irish Senior Cup.

== Millennium successes ==
The 1999–2000 season saw Annadale win the Kirk Cup for the first time. And, in the 2002–03 season the club attained the top spot in the Premier League of the Ulster Senior League. The league was won for five consecutive seasons from 2002 to 2003 to 2006–7.

The second team also sampled success, with four Irish Junior Cup wins.

== Notable players ==
=== Men's internationals ===
Ireland

- Chris Jackson
- David Smyth
- Michael Robson
- Peter Caruth
- Iain Lewers
- Stephen Martin
- Graham Shaw

England

- Iain Lewers

Great Britain

- Iain Lewers
- Stephen Martin

== Honours ==
- Irish Junior Cup
  - 1999–00, 2001–02, 2003–04, 2005–06
- Premier League
  - 2002–03, 2003–04, 2004–05, 2005–06, 2006–07
- Kirk Cup
  - 1999–00, 2003–04, 2007–08, 2013–14, 2016–17
- Anderson Cup
  - 1976–77, 2000–01, 2003–04, 2004–05, 2006–07, 2011-2012
