= East Antrim Hockey Club =

Men's field hockey club in Northern Ireland

- Sport: Men's hockey
- Founded: 1902
- Disbanded: c. 2005
- Association: Ulster Branch, Irish Hockey Association
- Colours: Green and White

East Antrim Hockey Club was a men's field hockey club in Northern Ireland, founded in 1902. It was based in Newtownabbey, County Antrim, Northern Ireland, 7 miles north of Belfast. It was affiliated to the Ulster Branch of the Irish Hockey Association and was one of the oldest clubs in Irish hockey. The club's motto was Non Sibi Cunctus. Its local rivals were Larne Hockey Club.

East Antrim celebrated its centenary year in 2002, with a series of events including a recreation of the club's first-ever game against Down, which it played in period costume. In 2003, East Antrim hosted their first invitational tournament in nearly 20 years. It folded circa 2005.
