= Ulster Senior League (men's hockey) =

The Ulster Senior League is a league competition for the first teams of men's hockey clubs affiliated to the Ulster Hockey Union of Hockey Ireland.

== Formation ==
At a Special General Meeting of the Union held on 15 October 1897 in the Royal Avenue Hotel, Belfast, the clubs present resolved to form the Ulster Senior League. Eight teams participated in the first season: Antrim, Ards, Cliftonville, King's (Liverpool) Regiment, Lisburn, North Down, North Staffordshire Regiment and Ulster

== Current composition of the Senior League ==
In 2024–25, there are 10 clubs in the Ulster Senior League season.

Premier League
Belfast Harlequins
Bangor
Cookstown
Kilkeel
Kilkeel
North Down
PSNI
Portadown
Queen's University
South Antrim

== Early format ==
From its formation until 1953 entry to the Ulster Senior League could only be obtained by application to the Ulster Hockey Union. The applicant club would then have to be successful in a vote amongst the Senior Clubs. The size of the Senior League varied between seven competing clubs in the 1900s to as many as eighteen in the late 1920s. With eighteen teams it was necessary to play the league in two pools with the winners of the pools playing a Test Match to decide that year's league champions.

== 1953 reorganisation ==
In 1953 the eight team Senior League amalgamated with the eight team Qualifying League. There was no realignment of teams at this time, the only difference was the renaming of the two leagues as Senior League Section A (the old Senior League) and Senior League Section B (the old Qualifying League). Teams did not change Sections during this period and no teams were promoted or relegated to or from the Senior League.

At the end of each league season the winner of Section A played the winner of Section B in a Test Match to decide the winner of the Keightley Cup. The loser of the Test Match was awarded the Ireland's Saturday Night Cup. During this period the trophy was always won by the Section A winner.

Senior League 1953–54 to 1956–57
Section A	Section B
Antrim	Albert Foundry
Banbridge	Down
Belfast YMCA	East Antrim
Cliftonville	Holywood
Lisnagarvey	Mossley
North Down	Newry Olympic
Portrush	Parkview
Queen's University	South Antrim

== 1958 reorganisation ==
Prior to the start of the 1957–58 season, the Council of the Ulster Branch made a controversial decision. Portrush, who had finished bottom of Section A in 1956–57 were demoted to Section B. Parkview, the winners of Section B in 1956–57, were moved to Section A. This signalled the intention of the League to move to Promotion and Relegation. A report was commissioned by the Council of the Ulster Branch to establish new league structures.

The report and debate lead to the league reorganising to allow for promotion and relegation prior to the start of the 1958–59 season. There were eight teams in each league section. A Qualifying League in two sections provided two lower rungs for the league, with a further Intermediate section below that. The formation of the sections again proved controversial, as some clubs were not placed in the section that their previous seasons standing would merit. In particular, it was reported that Saintfield (Intermediate A) had finished above four clubs in 1957–58 that were placed in Qualifying B.

Ulster Leagues after re-alignment in 1958–59
Senior League	Qualifying A	Qualifying B	Intermediate A
Antrim	Albert Foundry	Ballymena	Cookstown
Banbridge	Down	Bangor	Courtalds
Belfast YMCA	East Antrim	King's Scholars	Dunmurry
Cliftonville	Holywood	Lisburn OB	Hollerith
Lisnagarvey	Mossley	NICS	Lisnafillin
Parkview	Newry Olympic	Old Bleach	Montalto
Portrush	North Down	RUC	Portadown
Queen's University	South Antrim	Shorts & Harland	Saintfield

== 1969 reorganisation ==
At the end of the 1968–69 season the Senior League expanded from eight to ten teams and was renamed as Senior League Section 1. The remaining six Qualifying League 'A' were joined by the top four teams from Qualifying 'B' to form a ten team league known as Senior League Section 2. All remaining club first teams were entered in the Intermediate League. In season 1975–76 Section 2 was increased to 12 teams.

Membership of the two Senior League Sections at the start of the 1969–70 season was as follows

Senior League prior to 1969–70
Section 1	Section 2
Antrim	Bangor
Banbridge	Cookstown
Belfast YMCA	Crossgar
Cliftonville	East Antrim
Friends School OB	Newry
Instonians	North Down
Lisnagarvey	N.I.C.S.
Mossley	Parkview
Portrush	R.U.C.
Queen's University	Saintfield

== 2001 reorganisation ==
In 2001 Section 1 was reduced to eight teams, and was renamed as the Premier League. Section 2 remained with twelve teams and was renamed as Senior 1. The Intermediate League was renamed as Senior 2, with all remaining teams placed in this section.

The top three teams in the Premier League at the end of the season qualify for the All-Ireland Club Championship.

== 2015 reorganisation ==
The top four teams departed for the new Irish Hockey League (IHL) and the league reduced from three divisions to two. The League champions now qualify for the Provincial play-offs where they compete for promotion to the IHL.

== 2017 reorganisation ==
Four teams dropped into junior hockey and the two divisions were amalgamated into a single Premier League of fourteen teams.

== 2018 reorganisation ==
The Intermediate League was revived.

== Trophies ==
- Winners of the Premier League are awarded the Keightley Cup.
- Winners of Senior 1 were awarded the Ireland's Saturday Night Cup.
- Winners of Senior 2 were awarded the Cliftonville Cup.

== League winners and relegated clubs ==
=== 2018–19 on ===
Year	Relegated from Irish Hockey League	Premier League winner	Promoted to Irish Hockey League ^{1}	Premier League relegated	Intermediate League promoted
2025–26	Cookstown	Queen's University	n/a	Kilkeel; North Down	NICS
2024–25	CI Annadale	Cookstown	Cookstown	PSNI	Mossley
2023–24	Instonians	Cookstown	n/a	NICS; Raphoe	PSNI
2022–23	Cookstown	Queen's University	n/a	Mossley; Newry	Raphoe
2021–22	n/a	Instonians	Cookstown; Instonians	Raphoe	Bangor
2019–20	n/a^{2}	Cookstown ^{2}	n/a^{2}	Bangor; Ballynahinch^{2}	Belfast Harlequins; NICS^{2}
2018–19	Cookstown	Instonians	n/a	Antrim; Belfast Harlequins; NICS	Ballynahinch

Key:

- 1 – Irish Hockey League Second Division formed in 2018–19 with teams competing in addition to the Ulster Premier League. Promotion to the Irish Premier League is via the IHL Second Division.
- 2 – 2019–20 Season abandoned due to coronavirus pandemic. Cookstown declared Premier League champions using percentage equalisation method. No promotion to or relegation from Irish Hockey League. Relegation to and promotion from Intermediate League based on percentage equalisation method.

=== 2017–18 ===
Year	Relegated from Irish Hockey League	Premier League winner	Also promoted from Premier League	Premier League relegated
2017–18	n/a	Kilkeel	n/a	Cliftonville^{1}

Key:

- 1 – 2017–18 Cliftonville relegated to revived Intermediate League (and changed name to CIYMS). Other teams joining Intermediate League were Armagh, Ballymena, Ballynahinch, Down, Parkview, PSNI, Portrush and Saintfield.

=== 2015–16 to 2016–17 ===
Year	Relegated from Irish Hockey League	Premier League winner	Also promoted from Premier League	Premier League relegated	Senior One winner
2016–17	Instonians	Cookstown^{1}	Annadale^{2}	Campbellians^{3}	South Antrim^{4}
2015–16	Annadale & Cookstown	Instonians^{5}	n/a	South Antrim	Campbellians

Key:

- 1 – 2016–17 Cookstown promoted to Irish Hockey League after winning the promotion/relegation play-off.
- 2 – 2016–17 Annadale promoted to Irish Hockey League after winning the Provincial play-offs.
- 3 – 2016–17 Campbellians dropped into junior hockey.
- 4 – 2016–17 Antrim, Bangor, Cliftonville and Queen's University promoted alongside South Antrim. Armagh, Ballynahinch and Portrush dropped into junior hockey.
- 5 – 2015–16 Instonians promoted to Irish Hockey League after winning the Provincial play-offs.

=== 2010–11 to 2014–15 ===
Year	Premier League Winner	Premier League Relegated	Senior One Winner	Senior One Relegated	Senior Two Winner
2014–15	Banbridge^{1}	Antrim	unknown^{2}	PSNI(?)	Cliftonville^{3}
2013–14	Lisnagarvey	Raphoe	Newry	Cliftonville	Portrush
2012–13	Banbridge	Mossley	Raphoe	Armagh; Ballynahinch	PSNI^{4}
2011–12	Cookstown	North Down	Antrim	Cliftonville	Ballynahinch
2010–11	Lisnagarvey	Bangor	Belfast Harlequins	Ballynahinch	Campbellians
2009–10	Cookstown	Raphoe	N.I.C.S.	Down	Ballynahinch
2008–09	Cookstown	Raphoe^{5}	Kilkeel^{6}	Ballynahinch	Down
2007–08	Cookstown	Kilkeel	Raphoe	Down	Armagh
2006–07	Annadale	N.I.C.S.	Mossley	PSNI	Down
2005–06	Annadale	North Down	Kilkeel	Armagh	South Antrim
2004–05	Annadale	Raphoe	North Down	South Antrim	Armagh
2003–04	Annadale	Kilkeel	Raphoe	Armagh	Ballynahinch
2002–03	Annadale	Mossley	Bangor	Parkview	Portadown
2001–02	Lisnagarvey	Newry	Kilkeel	Portadown	Parkview

Key:

- 1 – 2014–15 Banbridge along with Annadale, Cookstown and Lisnagarvey joined the Irish Hockey League for the 2015–16 season.
- 2 – 2014–15 Mossley, North Down, Portadown, Raphoe and South Antrim promoted.
- 3 – 2014–15 Armagh, Ballynahinch and Cliftonville promoted. (Ballymena, Down, Larne, Newcastle, Parkview and Saintfield were relegated to the Junior League.)
- 4 – 2012–13 Cliftonville were also promoted.
- 5 – 2008–09 Raphoe were not relegated due to increase in number of teams in premier league to ten.
- 6 – 2008–09 North Down were also promoted to enable increase of premier league to ten teams.

=== 2000–01 to 1969–70 ===
Year	Section 1 Winner	Section 1 Relegated	Section 2 Winner	Section 2 Relegated	Intermediate Winner
2000–01	Lisnagarvey	North Down & Raphoe	Bangor^{1}	Larne, Parkview & Portrush	Armagh
1999-2000	Lisnagarvey	Cliftonville	N.I.C.S.	Down	R.U.C.
1998–99	Lisnagarvey	Bangor	North Down	R.U.C.	Portrush
1997–98	Instonians	Holywood '87	Bangor	Ballynahinch	Larne & South Antrim^{2}
1996–97	Lisnagarvey	Cliftonville^{3}	Bangor^{3}	R.U.C.^{3}	Larne^{3}
1995–96	Instonians	Bangor	Cliftonville	Portrush	North Down
1994–95	Lisnagarvey	Cliftonville	Bangor	East Antrim	R.U.C.
1993–94	Lisnagarvey	Bangor	Raphoe	South Antrim	Parkview
1992–93	Holywood '87	Queen's University	Bangor	R.U.C.	Portrush
1991–92	Lisnagarvey	Bangor	Cliftonville	Wanderers	Portadown
1990–91	Lisnagarvey	R.U.C.	Bangor	North Down	Ballynahinch
1989–90	Lisnagarvey	Bangor	Newry	Friends School Old Boys	North Down
1988–89	Banbridge	Collegians	Queen's University	North Down	Wanderers
1987–88	Banbridge	Antrim	Collegians	Portrush	N.I.C.S.
1986–87	Banbridge	Raphoe	R.U.C.	Corinthians	Kilkeel
1985–86	Banbridge	R.U.C.	Raphoe	N.I.C.S.	Collegians
1984–85	Belfast Y.M.C.A.	Cliftonville	Annadale	Collegians	Down
1983–84	Belfast Y.M.C.A.	Annadale	R.U.C.	Parkview	Collegians
1982–83	Cookstown	Queen's University	Annadale	Portadown	East Antrim
1981–82	Belfast Y.M.C.A.	Portadown	Bangor	Down & East Antrim	Newry & Parkview
1980–81	Lisnagarvey	Annadale	Portadown	Newry & Parkview	Corinthians & Down
1979–80	Belfast Y.M.C.A.	Raphoe	Queen's University	Collegians & Down	North Down & Parkview
1978–79	Belfast Y.M.C.A.^{4}	Bangor	Raphoe	North Down & Parkview	Down & South Antrim
1977–78	Lisnagarvey	Mossley^{5}	N.I.C.S.^{5}	Crossgar & Stranmillis	Collegians & Newry
1976–77	Lisnagarvey	Portrush	Bangor	Collegians & Newry	Raphoe & Stranmillis
1975–76	Cliftonville	Friends School Old Boys	Annadale	Stranmillis	Portadown
1974–75	Instonians	Parkview	Cookstown	No relegation	N.I.C.S. & Newry
1973–74	Cliftonville	Queen's University	Belfast Y.M.C.A.	Newry	East Antrim
1972–73	Cliftonville	Collegians	Banbridge	East Antrim	Newry
1971–72	Lisnagarvey	Banbridge	Collegians	Newry	Stranmillis
1970–71		Belfast Y.M.C.A.	Parkview	N.I.C.S.	Annadale
1969–70	Lisnagarvey	Banbridge & Mossley^{6}	Parkview^{6}	Saintfield	Collegians

Key:

- 1 – 2000–01 Bangor won Section 2 but lost a Promotion Playoff
- 2 – 1997–98 South Antrim were runners-up and gained promotion when Holywood '87 folded.
- 3 – 1996–97 Promotion and relegation suspended.
- 4 – 1978–79 Belfast YMCA won League after 3–1 victory in Test Match against Instonians.
- 5 – 1977–78 Promotion and relegation between Section 1 and 2 suspended because of Ireland's participation in the Hockey World Cup in Argentina.
- 6 – 1969–70 Promotion and relegation between Section 1 and 2 suspended.

=== 1968–69 to 1957–58 ===
Year	Senior Winner	Senior Relegated	Qual. 'A' Winner	Qual. 'A' Relegated	Qual. 'B' Winner	Qual. 'B' Relegated	Inter. 'A' Winner
1968–69	Cliftonville		F.S.O.B.		North Down		Collegians
1967–68	Cliftonville	R.U.C.	Mossley	East Antrim^{1}	Cookstown		Short & Harland
1966–67	Cliftonville	Banbridge	R.U.C.	Portadown	East Antrim	Ballymena	Cookstown
1965–66	Lisnagarvey	Mossley	Instonians	Lissara^{2}	F.S.O.B.	Holywood	East Antrim
1964–65	Lisnagarvey^{3}	Parkview	Mossley	North Down	Lissara	Albert Foundry	Lisburn OB^{4}
1963–64	Y.M.C.A.	Bangor	Parkview	Montalto^{5}	Portadown	None^{5}	Lissara
1962–63	Lisnagarvey	Parkview	Portrush	Holywood	Instonians	South Antrim	King's Scholars
1961–62	Banbridge	Portrush	Bangor	Down	Old Bleach	East Antrim	Instonians
1960–61	Lisnagarvey	Mossley	Parkview	Albert Foundry	Bangor	Short & Harland	Portadown
1959–60	Lisnagarvey	Parkview	Cliftonville	South Antrim	Montalto	King's Scholars	Saintfield
1958–59		Cliftonville	Mossley	East Antrim	RUC	Lisburn OB	Montalto
1957–58		North Down	Portrush				

KEY

- 1 – 1967–68 Old Bleach(Qual. A) folded after this season. As a result, East Antrim were not relegated. In addition Holywood(Int. A) folded.
- 2 – 1965–66 Lissara renamed as Crossgar at the end of this season.
- 3 – 1964–65 Lisnagarvey won League after Test Match with Cliftonville
- 4 – 1964–65 Lisburn Old Boys renamed as Friends School Old Boys at the end of this season.
- 5 – 1963–64 Montalto withdrew from League during season. No relegation from Qualifying B.

=== 1956–57 to formation ===
- 1956–57
- 1955–56 Belfast YMCA (Won Test Match against Parkview)
- 1954–55 Lisnagarvey (Won Test Match against Parkview)
- 1953–54 Lisnagarvey (Won Test Match against Down)
- 1952–53 Lisnagarvey
- 1951–52 Lisnagarvey
- 1950–51 Lisnagarvey
- 1949–50 Lisnagarvey (Won Test Match 1–0 v Parkview)
- 1948–49 Parkview (Won Test Match 2–1 after extra time v Antrim)
- 1947–48
- 1946–47
- 1945–46
- 1944–45 Lisnagarvey
- 1943–44
- 1942–43
- 1941–42
- 1940–41
- 1939–40
- 1938–39 Lisnagarvey
- 1937–38 Lisnagarvey
- 1936–37 North Down
- 1935–36 North Down
- 1934–35 North Down
- 1933–34 Lisnagarvey (Won Test Match 3–1 v North Down) (2 section Senior League)
- 1932–33 North Down
- 1931–32 North Down
- 1930–31 Cliftonville
- 1929–30 Antrim
- 1928–29 Cliftonville
- 1927–28 Antrim
- 1926–27 Antrim
- 1925–26 Banbridge (Won Test Match 3–2 v Lisnagarvey)
- 1924–25 Lisnagarvey
- 1923–24 East Antrim (Won Test Match 4–3 v Banbridge)
- 1922–23
- 1921–22
- 1920–21 Antrim (Won Test Match 3–1 v Banbridge)
- 1919–20
- 1918–19 Not Played
- 1917–18 Not Played
- 1916–17 Not Played
- 1915–16 Not Played
- 1914–15 Not Played
- 1913–14 Banbridge
- 1912–13 Banbridge
- 1911–12 Queen's University
- 1910–11 Banbridge
- 1909–10 Banbridge (after a Test Match)
- 1908–09 Banbridge (after a Test Match)
- 1907–08 Antrim
- 1906–07 Cliftonville (after a Test Match)
- 1905–06 Malone
- 1904–05 Antrim (after a Test Match)
- 1903–04 Banbridge
- 1902–03 Antrim
- 1901–02 Banbridge
- 1900–01 Antrim
- 1899-1900 North Down
- 1898–99
- 1897–98 Antrim

== Sources ==
Information gathered from Belfast Newsletter and Ireland Saturday Night
