= N.I.C.S. Hockey Club =

Northern Ireland Civil Service Hockey Club (NICS Hockey Club) plays its hockey in the grounds of the Stormont Estate in County Down, Northern Ireland. The grounds are also home to the local Government administration, The Northern Ireland Assembly. The grounds also include football and rugby pitches, an international standard cricket pitch, tennis facilities and outdoor bowls. The extended grounds have hosted a number of events over recent years, including rock concerts, international cricket matches and cross-country running. Everyone is welcome to join the hockey club, whether public servant or not. For the 2011/12 year, the club is fielding 6 senior men's teams & 3 ladies' teams, participating in the Ulster HockeyLeagues.

The club also runs a Youth Section on Monday (girls) & Thursday (boys) evenings to help develop hockey skills for those not yet old enough to play Senior hockey.

The hockey club is affiliated to the Northern Ireland Civil Service Sports Association (NICSSA) who maintain the playing facilities.

== History ==
Northern Ireland Civil Service Ladies Hockey Club was formed in 1922 and the Men's Hockey Club was formed a year later, in September 1923. The club celebrated its 75th anniversary in 1998, publishing a 120-page book detailing the club's history.

During 2009, a major investment project commenced, with the development of two new pitches in time for the start of the 2010 season. The club now play on two state of the art hockey pitches, one water-based and the other sand-dressed.

2010 hailed a new era for the club, as the NICS Men and Ladies Hockey Clubs merged to form the NICS Hockey Club.
