= Men's Irish Senior Cup (field hockey) =

- Administrator: Hockey Ireland
- Country: Republic of Ireland; Northern Ireland
- Most recent champion: Lisnagarvey (28 titles)
- Official website: Men's Irish Senior Cup

The Men's Irish Senior Cup is the senior field hockey cup competition organised by Hockey Ireland, featuring men's teams from the Republic of Ireland and Northern Ireland. The competition was first established in 1893, making it the oldest field hockey cup competition in the world. Lisnagarvey are the competition's most successful team.

== 2018–19 format ==
The 2018–19 format saw the Men's Irish Hockey League Division 1 teams receive a bye into Round 3, the last sixteen. Rounds 1 and 2 feature teams from the Munster, Leinster and the Ulster Senior Leagues.

== Finals ==
=== 1890s ===
Season	Winners	Score	Runners up
1893–94	Dundrum	2–1	Dublin University
1894–95	Dublin University	3–1	Dundrum
1895–96	Dundrum	3–1	Dublin University
1896–97	Dublin University	3–1	Dundrum
1897–98	Three Rock Rovers	4–0	Dublin University
1898–99	Dublin University	w/o	(Note: North Down and Cork (Cork) scratched.)

=== 1900s ===
Season	Winners	Score	Runners up
1899–1900	Palmerstown (Palmerstown)		Cork (Cork)
1900–01	Dublin University	2–1	Corinthians
1901–02	Dublin University	5–2	Cork
1902–03	Palmerstown	5–0	Cork
1903–04	Palmerstown	5–1	Cork
1904–05	Palmerstown	6–0	North Down
1905–06	Dublin University	3–0	Malone
1906–07	Banbridge	1–1 (Note: Banbridge awarded Cup when Palmerstown scratched from the replay.)	Palmerstown
1907–08	Three Rock Rovers	6–0	North Down
1908–09	Dundrum	1–0	Banbridge

=== 1910s ===
Season	Winners	Score	Runners up
1909–10	Monkstown	3–1	Queen's University
1910–11	Royal Hibernians	3–2 (Note: Royal Hibernians win after extra time.)	Banbridge
1911–12	Queen's University	4–2	Three Rock Rovers
1912–13	Royal Hibernians	3–0	Banbridge
1913–14	Monkstown	1–0	Queen's University

=== 1920s ===
Season	Winners	Score	Runners up
1919–20	Royal Hibernians	2–1	Banbridge
1920–21	Royal Hibernians	9–0	Queen's University
1921–22	Limerick PYMA (Limerick)	1–0	Banbridge
1922–23	Banbridge	3–2	Monkstown
1923–24	Banbridge	1–0	Limerick PYMA
1924–25	Lisnagarvey	3–0 (Note: 2nd Replay - Game 1: 0-0 3 periods of extra time; Game 2: 1-1 4 periods of extra time.)	Limerick PYMA
1925–26	Banbridge	5–1	Railway & Steam Packet Union
1926–27	Lisnagarvey	2–1 (Note: After extra time)	Railway & Steam Packet Union
1927–28	Limerick PYMA	2–1 (Note: After extra time)	Antrim
1928–29	Railway & Steam Packet Union		Limerick PYMA

=== 1930s ===
Season	Winners	Score	Runners up
1929–30	Railway & Steam Packet Union	2–1 (Note: After extra time)	Limerick PYMA
1930–31	Railway Union	2–0	Maryville
1931–32	Cliftonville	4–1	Dublin University
1932–33	Pembroke Wanderers	2–0	Banbridge
1933–34	Dublin University	5–0	Limerick PYMA
1934–35	Dublin University	2–0	Cliftonville
1935–36	Dublin University	5–2	North Down
1936–37	Pembroke Wanderers	3–1 (Note: After replay. First game was 0–0 after two periods of extra time.)	Queen's University
1937–38	Railway Union	1–0 (Note: After replay and two periods of extra time, first game finished 0–0)	Cork Harlequins
1938–39	Three Rock Rovers	1–0	Limerick PYMA

=== 1940s ===
Season	Winners	Score	Runners up
1939–40	YMCA (Dublin)	2–1	Limerick PYMA
1940–41	Lisnagarvey	(Note: Bad weather originally delayed the final and when a date was eventually arranged it was again cancelled following the Belfast Blitz. A number of Lisnagarvey players served as A.R.P.s and were unable to travel to the final. The Irish Hockey Union and Limerick PMYA both agreed the trophy should be shared.)	Limerick PYMA
1941–42	Dublin University	2–1 (Note: After extra time.)	Maryborough
1942–43	Dublin University	5–0	Lisnagarvey
1943–44	YMCA (Dublin)	2–0 (Note: After two periods of extra time.)	Banbridge
1944–45	Lisnagarvey	2–1	Dublin University
1945–46	Lisnagarvey	4–3 (Note: After extra time.)	YMCA (Dublin)
1946–47	Dublin University	2–1	Catholic Institute (Limerick)
1947–48	Banbridge	3–0	Cork Church of Ireland
1948–49	YMCA (Dublin)	1–0	Lisnagarvey

=== 1950s ===
Season	Winners	Score	Runners up
1949–50	YMCA (Dublin)	4–1 (Note: After extra time.)	Cork Harlequins
1950–51	Lisnagarvey	2–1	YMCA (Dublin)
1951–52	Lisnagarvey	4–3 (Note: After extra time.)	Pembroke Wanderers
1952–53	Three Rock Rovers	3–1	Lansdowne
1953–54	YMCA (Dublin)	4–2	Antrim
1954–55	Lansdowne	2–1	YMCA (Dublin)
1955–56	Banbridge	1–0	Lansdowne
1956–57	YMCA (Dublin)	4–3 (Note: After extra time.)	Banbridge
1957–58	Lisnagarvey	2–0	Dublin University
1958–59	Three Rock Rovers	1–0	Lisnagarvey

=== 1960s ===
Season	Winners	Score	Runners up
1959–60	Lisnagarvey	4–3	Three Rock Rovers
1960–61	Belfast YMCA	1–0	Lansdowne
1961–62	Three Rock Rovers	0–0 (Note: Three Rock Rovers and Lisnagarvey shared the trophy shared after two replays. First game finished 2–2; Second game finished 1–1.)	Lisnagarvey
1962–63	Three Rock Rovers	1–0	Lansdowne
1963–64	Three Rock Rovers	3–1	Cork Church of Ireland
1964–65	YMCA (Dublin)	1–0 (Note: After extra time in replay - Game 1: 1-1.)	Portrush
1965–66	Lisnagarvey	3–0	Pembroke Wanderers
1966–67	Cork Church of Ireland	2–1	Pembroke Wanderers
1967–68	Cork Church of Ireland	1–0	Railway Union
1968–69	Cork Church of Ireland	1–0	Queen's University

=== 1970s ===
Season	Winners	Score	Runners up
1969–70	Lisnagarvey	1–0 (Note: After extra time.)	Monkstown
1970–71	Lisnagarvey	2–1 (Note: After 2 periods of extra time.)	Cork Church of Ireland
1971–72	Queen's University	3–0	Monkstown
1972–73	Pembroke Wanderers	1–0	Cork Church of Ireland
1973–74	Three Rock Rovers	2–1	Cork Church of Ireland
1974–75	Cliftonville	1–0	Railway Union
1975–76	Cliftonville	4–1	Waterford (Waterford)
1976–77	Belfast YMCA	1–0	Three Rock Rovers
1977–78	YMCA (Dublin)	1–0	Lisnagarvey
1978–79	YMCA (Dublin)	2–0	Belfast YMCA

=== 1980s ===
Season	Winners	Score	Runners up
1979–80	Belfast YMCA	2–0	Cookstown
1980–81	Queen's University	1–0	Lisnagarvey
1981–82	Banbridge	2–0	Cliftonville
1982–83	Belfast YMCA	2–1	Avoca
1983–84	Banbridge	3–1	Annadale
1984–85	Belfast YMCA	2–1	Avoca
1985–86	Banbridge	4–3	Three Rock Rovers
1986–87	Cookstown	4–0	Banbridge
1987–88	Lisnagarvey	3–2	Cookstown
1988–89	Lisnagarvey	1–0	Avoca

=== 1990s ===
Season	Winners	Score	Runners up
1989–90	Lisnagarvey	4–0	YMCA (Dublin)
1990–91	Lisnagarvey	3–0	Cork Harlequins
1991–92	Lisnagarvey	3–1 (Note: After extra time.)	Holywood '87 (Holywood)
1992–93	Lisnagarvey	1–0	Avoca
1993–94	Lisnagarvey	2–0	Banbridge
1994–95	Instonians	2–1	Cork Harlequins
1995–96	Avoca	3–2 (Note: After replay and two periods of extra time. First game finished 2–2.)	Lisnagarvey
1996–97	Lisnagarvey	4–3	Pembroke Wanderers
1997–98	Instonians	3–2	Three Rock Rovers
1998–99	Cork Church of Ireland	4–3	Three Rock Rovers

Notes

=== 2000s ===
Season	Winners	Score	Runners up
1999–2000	Pembroke Wanderers	3–3 (Note: After extra time. Pembroke Wanderers won 4–3 on penalties.)	Lisnagarvey
2000–01	Glennane	2–1	YMCA (Dublin)
2001–02	Instonians	2–1	Pembroke Wanderers
2002–03	Lisnagarvey	3–2	Cork Harlequins
2003–04	Instonians	1–0 (Note: After extra time)	Cork Harlequins
2004–05	Lisnagarvey	3–2	Instonians
2005–06	Cork Harlequins	2–1	Lisnagarvey
2006–07	Glennane	4–3 (Note: After extra time - golden goal.)	Annadale
2007–08	Pembroke Wanderers	3–0	Monkstown
2008–09	Pembroke Wanderers	6–0	Cookstown

Notes

=== 2010s ===
Season	Winners	Score	Runners up	Venue
2009–10	Glennane	4–1	Monkstown	Belfield
2010–11	Cookstown	4–3	Monkstown	Belfield
2011–12	Cork Harlequins	4–3	Railway Union	
2012–13	Monkstown	5–4	Pembroke Wanderers	Belfield
2013–14	Three Rock Rovers	2–2 (Note: After extra time. Three Rock Rovers won on penalties.)	Pembroke Wanderers	
2014–15	Banbridge	2–1 (Note: After extra time.)	Cork Church of Ireland	Belfield
2015–16	Monkstown	2–2 (Note: After extra time; Monkstown won 6–5 after a penalty shoot-out.)	Lisnagarvey	Belfield
2016–17	Banbridge	3–1	Monkstown	Belfield
2017–18	Three Rock Rovers	5–2	Pembroke Wanderers	Belfield
2018–19	Three Rock Rovers	1–0	Lisnagarvey	Grange Road

Notes

=== 2020s ===
Season	Winners	Score	Runners up	Venue
2019–20	Lisnagarvey	3–2	UCD	Comber Road
2021-22	Lisnagarvey	3-1	Monkstown	Belfield
2022-23	Banbridge	2-2 Banbridge won 4-1 in shoot-out	Glennane	Belfield
2023-24	Lisnagarvey	3-2	Banbridge	Belfield
2024-25	Lisnagarvey	4-0	YMCA	Grange Road
2025-26	Lisnagarvey	3-3 Lisnagarvey won 3-1 in shoot-out	Three Rock Rovers	Grange Road

== List of winners by club ==
Club	Titles	Seasons
Lisnagarvey	28	1924–25, 1926–27, 1940–41^{(Note 1)}, 1944–45, 1945–46, 1950–51, 1951–52, 1957–58, 1959–60, 1961–62^{(Note 2)}, 1965–66, 1969–70, 1970–71, 1987–88, 1988–89, 1989–90, 1990–91, 1991–92, 1992–93, 1993–94, 1996–97, 2002–03, 2004–05, 2019–20, 2021-22, 2023-24, 2024-25, 2025-26
Dublin University	12	1894–95, 1896–97, 1898–99, 1900–01, 1901–02, 1905–06, 1933–34, 1934–35, 1935–36, 1941–42, 1942–43, 1946–47
Three Rock Rovers	12	1897–98, 1907–08, 1938–39, 1952–53, 1958–59, 1961–62^{(Note 2)}, 1962–63, 1963–64, 1973–74, 2013–14, 2017–18, 2018–19
Banbridge	12	1906–07, 1922–23, 1923–24, 1925–26, 1947–48, 1955–56, 1981–82, 1983–84, 1985–86, 2014–15, 2016–17, 2022-23
YMCA (Dublin)	9	1939–40, 1943–44, 1948–49, 1949–50, 1953–54, 1956–57, 1964–65, 1977–78, 1978–79
Pembroke Wanderers	6	1932–33, 1936–37, 1972–73, 1999–2000, 2007–08, 2008–09
Belfast YMCA	5	1960–61, 1976–77, 1979–80, 1982–83, 1984–85
Cork Church of Ireland	4	1966–67, 1967–68, 1968–69, 1998–99
Instonians	4	1994–95, 1997–98, 2001–02, 2003–04.
Monkstown	4	1909–10, 1913–14, 2012–13, 2015–16
Palmerstown (Palmerstown)	4	1899–1900, 1902–03, 1903–04, 1904–05
Railway Union	4	1928–29, 1929–30, 1930–31, 1937–38
Royal Hibernians	4	1910–11, 1912–13, 1919–20, 1920–21
Cliftonville	3	1931–32, 1974–75, 1975–76
Dundrum	3	1893–94, 1895–96, 1908–09
Glenanne	3	2000–01, 2006–07, 2009–10
Limerick PYMA (Limerick)	3	1921–22, 1927–28, 1940–41 ^{(Note 1)}
Queen's University	3	1911–12, 1971–72, 1980–81
Cookstown	2	1986–87, 2010–11
Cork Harlequins	2	2005–06, 2011–12
Avoca	1	1995–96
Lansdowne	1	1954–55

Notes

- ^1 In 1940–41 bad weather originally delayed the final and when a date was eventually arranged it was again cancelled following the Belfast Blitz. A number of Lisnagarvey players served as A.R.P.s and were unable to travel to the final. The Irish Hockey Union and Limerick PMYA both agreed the trophy should be shared.
- ^2 In 1961–62 Three Rock Rovers and Lisnagarvey shared the trophy shared after two replays. First game finished 2–2; Second game finished 1–1 and the Third game finished 0-0
