= Banbridge Hockey Club =

Hockey club in Northern Ireland

Bainbridge Hockey Club
- Full name: Banbridge Hockey Club
- League: Ulster Hockey Union
- Founded: 1897
- Colors: Red, amber and black
- Home ground: Havelock Park (Capacity 2,000)

Personnel
- President: Mrs Catherine Henderson
- Captain: Alexander Tinney (men), Samantha Bann (women)
- Coach: Scott McCandless (men), Finlay Marney (women)
- Manager: Colin Walker
- Website: https://www.banbridgehockeyclub.com

Banbridge Hockey Club is a hockey club based in Banbridge, County Down, Northern Ireland. The club was formed in 1897.

== Grounds ==
The club's first home was at Millmount Green, off the Lurgan Road in Banbridge. In 1949, the club purchased grounds at Castlewellan Road. These continued to be used until 1998 when the need for an artificial-turf pitch meant a move to the new Banbridge District Council facilities at Havelock Park. In March 2007, plans were announced for the laying of a new replacement water-based surface.

== Notable players ==
=== Men's internationals ===
Ireland

Edgar McCall was the first Banbridge player to be awarded an international cap when he represented Ireland against Wales in 1900. Over thirty Banbridge players have been selected for Ireland. These include:

- Aubrey Allister
- Colin Allister
- Matthew Bell
- Peter Brown
- Phillip Brown
- Drew Carlisle
- Stephen Dowds
- Fergus Gibson
- Jack Harvey
- Gareth Lennox
- Eugene Magee
- Owen Magee
- Paddy Malcomson
- Rodney Malcolmson
- David McAnulty
- Geoff McCabe
- Edgar McCall
- Bruce McCandless
- George McElroy
- Norman McGladdery
- John McKee Snr
- John McKee Jnr
- Luke Roleston
- Charlie Rowe
- Louis Rowe
- Mark Sinnamon
- Lee Tumilty
- Luke Witherow
- Jamie Wright

== Honours ==
- Irish Senior Cup (12 wins)
  - 1906–07, 1922–23, 1923–24, 1925–26, 1947–48, 1955–56, 1981–82, 1983–84, 1985–86, 2014–15, 2016–17, 2022–23
- Irish Hockey League (4 wins)
  - 2010–11, 2016–17, 2022–23, 2023–24
- Irish Champions Trophy (3 wins)
  - 2022–23, 2023–24, 2024–25
- Anderson Cup (list is incomplete)
  - 1919–20, 1920–21, 1923–24, 1926–27, 1927–28, 1930–31, 1932–33, 1943–44, 1944–45, 1972–73, 1973–74, 1974–75, 1981–82, 1983–84, 1985–86, 1990–91, 1991–92, 1997–98, 2005–06, 2008–09, 2009–10, 2014–15, 2023–24, 2025-26
- Euro Hockey League
  - 2011-12 (Round01), 2016-17 (KO16), 2017-18 (Round01), 2023-24 (17th Place), 2024-25 (13th Place), 2025–26 (13th Place)
- EuroHockey Club Trophy I (1 win)
  - 1985
- EuroHockey Club Trophy II (1 win)
  - 2023
- EuroHockey Club Challenge I (1 win)
  - 2014
- Irish Junior Cup (6 wins)
  - 1928–29, 1948–49, 1952–53, 1988–89, 1993–94, 2004–05.
- Kirk Cup (22 wins)
  - 1905–06, 1908–09, 1909–10, 1910–11, 1912–13, 1913–14, 1919–20, 1925–26, 1926–27, 1934–35, 1937–38, 1949–50, 1950–51, 1956–57, 1982–83, 1985–86, 1986–87, 1987–88, 2005–06, 2010–11., 2014–15, 2018–19, 2019–20
- Ulster Senior League (19 wins – list is incomplete)
  - 1901–02, 1903–04, 1908–09, 1909–10, 1910–11, 1912–13, 1913–14, 1925–26, 1961–62, 1985–86, 1986–87, 1987–88, 1988–89, 2012–13.
  - (Shared) 1957–58
