= Ulster Hockey Union =

Field hockey governing body

- Formation: 1896
- Headquarters: Stirling House; 478 Castlereagh Road; Belfast; BT5 6BQ
- Region served: Ulster
- Key people: Marc Scott - Chief Executive
- Parent organization: Hockey Ireland
- Website: https://ulsterhockey.com/
- Formerly called: Ulster Branch of the Irish Hockey Association; Ulster Women's Hockey Union

The Ulster Hockey Union is the governing body for field hockey in Ulster. It is affiliated to Hockey Ireland. It organises a number of leagues and cup competitions for clubs and schools in the province. These include the Ulster Senior League, the Kirk Cup and the Ulster Shield. Over 70 clubs are affiliated to the union.

== Foundation ==
The modern Ulster Hockey Union was founded in May 2009 following the merger of the Ulster Branch of the Irish Hockey Association and the Ulster Women's Hockey Union. The UBIHA was originally formed in December 1896. Founding members of the original association included the North Down, Cliftonville and Antrim hockey clubs. At a special general meeting on 15 October 1897 at the Royal Avenue Hotel, Belfast, members of the association agreed to form the Ulster Senior League. The 1897–98 season also the introduction of the association's senior men's cup competition, the Kirk Cup.

== Competitions ==
=== Men's ===
- Ulster Senior League
- Kirk Cup
- Anderson Cup

=== Women's ===
- Ulster Shield

=== Schoolboys ===
- Burney Cup
- McCullough Cup
- Richardson Cup

=== Schoolgirls ===
- Ulster Schoolgirls' Senior Cup

== Representative players ==
The Ulster Hockey Union also organises representative teams. They mainly play against teams representing the other provinces of Ireland. A number of Ireland, England and Great Britain internationals have also played for Ulster at interprovincial level.

=== Men ===
Ireland

- Harry Cahill
- Mark Gleghorne
- David Judge ^{(Note 1)}
- Iain Lewers
- Eugene Magee
- Stephen Martin
- Martin Sloan

Great Britain

- Harry Cahill
- Mark Gleghorne
- David Judge ^{(Note 1)}
- Iain Lewers
- Stephen Martin
- Martin Sloan

England

- Mark Gleghorne
- Iain Lewers

Notes

- ^1 David Judge represented Ulster at schoolboy level.

=== Women ===
Ireland

- Margaret Gleghorne
- Violet McBride
- Jackie McWilliams
- Maeve Kyle

Great Britain

- Margaret Gleghorne
- Violet McBride
- Jackie McWilliams

== Personnel ==
- Stephen Martin worked for the union as a sports development manager from 1985 until 1991.
- Shirley McCay has worked as a coach for the union since 2013.
- Angela Platt served as the executive manager of the union from 2009 until 2017.
