= Hockey Ireland =

Field hockey governing body

- Formation: 1893; 133 years ago
- Headquarters: Unit 6 Sports HQ2; Sport Ireland Campus; Blanchardstown; Dublin 15
- Region served: Ireland; Northern Ireland
- Secretary: Pamela Bastable
- Chair: Niamh Byrne
- President: Barbara O'Malley
- Parent organization: International Hockey Federation
- Affiliations: European Hockey Federation; Sport Ireland; Sport Northern Ireland; Olympic Federation of Ireland
- Website: hockey.ie
- Formerly called: Irish Hockey Union; Irish Ladies Hockey Union; Irish Hockey Association

Hockey Ireland, previously known as the Irish Hockey Association, is the governing body for field hockey in both the Republic of Ireland and Northern Ireland. It is responsible for organising both the Ireland men's national field hockey team and the Ireland women's national field hockey team, as well as national leagues and cup competitions. Hockey Ireland is mainly funded through grants as well as small contributions from Sport Ireland, Sport Northern Ireland and the Olympic Council of Ireland. In 2013 Hockey Ireland became a limited company. Approximately 168 clubs and 280 schools are affiliated to Hockey Ireland.

== History ==
The Irish Hockey Union was founded on 6 February 1893, following a meeting at the Wicklow Hotel. The men's Irish Senior Cup was first played for in 1893–94, making it the oldest field hockey cup competition in the world. The men's Irish Junior Cup was first played for in 1894–95. On 26 January 1895 the Ireland men's national field hockey team played in the first ever international field hockey match when they defeated Wales 3–0 in Rhyl. The Irish Ladies Hockey Union was established in 1894, following a meeting at Alexandra College. In March 1896 they hosted the first ever women's international field hockey match when the Ireland women's national field hockey team defeated England 2–0 at Alexandra College. Ireland joined the International Hockey Federation in 1950. The two unions merged in May 2000 to form the Irish Hockey Association. The merger came about after the International Hockey Federation declared in 1998 that each national member must be governed by just one organisation.

== National teams ==
- Ireland men's national field hockey team
- Ireland women's national field hockey team

== Men's competitions ==
- Men's Irish Hockey League
- Irish Senior Cup
- Irish Junior Cup

== Women's competitions ==
- Women's Irish Hockey League
- Irish Senior Cup
- Irish Junior Cup

== Affiliated bodies ==
- Irish Hockey Umpires Association
- Irish Universities Hockey Association
- Connacht Hockey
- Leinster Hockey Association
- Munster Hockey
- Ulster Hockey Union
