= 1974–75 in English field hockey =

1974–75 England Hockey League

The 1974–75 English Hockey League season took place from September 1974 until April 1975.

The Men's Cup was won by Southgate.

The Inaugural Men's National Inter League Championship brought together the winners of their respective regional leagues. The event was the predecessor of the National League and the championship (held in September 1975) was won by Bedfordshire Eagles in its first year.

As from the 1980-81 season the National Inter League Championship would be held in the spring of the same season instead of the Autumn of the following season.

== Men's Courage National Inter League Championship ==
(Held at Aston University Grounds, Birmingham, September 13–14)

=== Group A ===
Team 1	Team 2	Score
Coventry & North Warwickshire	Ashford	1-0
Southgate	Doncaster	1-0
Coventry & North Warwickshire	Southgate	1-1
Ashford	Doncaster	1-2
Coventry & North Warwickshire	Doncaster	3-3
Ashford	Southgate	0-3

Pos	Team	P	W	D	L	F	A	Pts
1	Southgate	3	2	1	0	5	1	5
2	Coventry & North Warwickshire	3	1	2	0	5	4	4
3	Doncaster	3	1	1	1	5	5	3
4	Ashford	3	0	0	3	1	6	0

=== Group B ===
Team 1	Team 2	Score
Norton	Bedfordshire Eagles	0-6
Havant	Liverpool Sefton	3-1
Norton	Havant	1-4
Bedfordshire Eagles	Liverpool Sefton	1-1
Bedfordshire Eagles	Havant	3-0
Norton	Liverpool Sefton	1-0

Pos	Team	P	W	D	L	F	A	Pts
1	Bedfordshire Eagles	3	2	1	0	10	1	5
2	Havant	3	2	0	1	7	5	4
3	Norton	3	1	0	2	2	10	2
3	Liverpool Sefton	3	0	1	2	2	5	1

= Qualified for final

=== Final ===
Team 1	Team 2	Score
Bedfordshire Eagles	Southgate	2-0

Bedfordshire Eagles
P Ball, M Blake, M Hodge, M Ganesh, Brajinder Daved, P Goodyear, P Ellis, Benawra Singh, R Jackson, M Kavanagh (capt), J Ashford
Southgate
David Owen (gk), David Collison, David Whitaker, Tony Ekins, R J Owen, Michael Corby, Alistair McGinn (Ian McGinn sub), Michael Crowe (capt), David Aldridge, John Walker, James Neale (G Pickard sub)

== Men's Cup (Benson & Hedges National Clubs Championship) ==
=== Quarter-finals ===
Team 1	Team 2	Score
Portsmouth Command Royal Navy		
Nottingham	Marlborough	
Bedfordshire Eagles	Brooklands	3-0
Southgate	Bromley	

=== Semi-finals ===
Team 1	Team 2	Score
Southgate	Bedfordshire Eagles	1-0
Nottingham	Portsmouth Command Royal Navy	3-0

=== Final ===
(Held at Goosedale Farm, Bestwood Park, Nottingham, on 27 April)

Team 1	Team 2	Score
Southgate	Nottingham	4-0

Southgate
David Owen (gk), David Collison, David Whitaker, Tony Ekins, Bernie Cotton, Michael Corby, Ian McGinn, Michael Crowe, (David Aldridge sub), John Walker, James Neale, t'Hoen
Nottingham
Sergeant, Watson, Appleby, Elson, Rivers, Stables, Walters, Cassell, Maughan, Stokes, Roper (Beck sub)
