= 1973–74 in English field hockey =

1973–74 England Hockey League

The 1973–74 English Hockey League season took place from September 1973 until May 1974.

The principal event was the Men's Cup (National Clubs Championship) which was won by Southgate.

The vast majority of the season consisted of regional leagues. The first National League tournament (The National Inter League Championship) would not be introduced until September 1975.

== Men's Cup (Benson & Hedges National Clubs Championship) ==
=== Quarter-finals ===
Team 1	Team 2	Score
St Luke's College, Exeter	Derby	March 16
RAF Strike Command	Brooklands	2-0
Bedfordshire Eagles		
Southgate	Guildford	3-0

=== Semi-finals ===
Team 1	Team 2	Score
Southgate	RAF Strike Command	7-0
Bedfordshire Eagles	St Luke's College, Exeter	2-1 aet

=== Final ===
(Held at Luton on 19 May)

Team 1	Team 2	Score
Southgate	Bedfordshire Eagles	3-0

Southgate
David Owen (gk), David Collison, David Whitaker, Tony Ekins, Ian McGinn, Bernie Cotton, P J White (J V Knight sub), Michael Corby, Michael Crowe, John Walker, James Neale
Bedfordshire Eagles
P K Ball, M W Blake, T J Machin, D Bunyan, Brajinder Daved, P Goodyear, P Ellis, K N Tubby, S Sharma, M Kavanagh, C M Hodge (G Player sub)
