= Roger Self =

British field hockey player (1939–2017)

Personal information
- Born: 10 June 1939
- Died: 5 June 2017 (aged 77)

Sport
- Sport: Field hockey
Medal record
Men's field hockey
Representing Great Britain
Olympic Games
Gold medal – first place	1988 Seoul	Team competition
Bronze medal – third place	1984 Los Angeles	Team competition
Champions Trophy
Bronze medal – third place	1978 Lahore	Team competition

Roger Douglas Self (10 June 1939 – 5 June 2017) was a hockey international coach and manager, who was the team manager of the Great Britain national field hockey team that won the gold medal at the 1988 Summer Olympics.

== Biography ==
Self played club hockey for Redditch and Worcestershire but his career as a player was unremarkable. However, the Welsh team manager Tony Bannister recognised his coaching ability and recruited Self to help coach the Welsh team that participated at the 1970 Men's EuroHockey Nations Championship in Brussels. He later managed and coached Wales at the 1974 Men's EuroHockey Nations Championship in Madrid and hoped to be chosen as the Great Britain coach for the 1976 Summer Olympics in Montreal. He was subsequently overlooked and then stepped down as the Welsh manager in 1977, to concentrate on his role at Southgate Hockey Club.

At Southgate, he steered the team to EuroHockey Club Champions Cup glory for three successive years in 1976, 1977 and 1978.

The success led the Great Britain hockey board to appointing Self as the coach for inaugural 1978 Men's Hockey Champions Trophy, in Lahore, Pakistan and the team secured a bronze medal. Self was to miss the Olympics for second time when the Great Britain team for the 1980 Olympic Games in Moscow did not attend due to the boycott.

Four years later Self and Great Britain received a late call for the 1984 Summer Olympics in Los Angeles and he finally got to attend an Olympic Games. He brought in David Whitaker as coach and the team secured a bronze medal.

The bronze medal was unexpected and as a consequence Self was in charge of Great Britain for the 1988 Summer Olympics and the gold medal win thereafter. After managing and coaching, he became involved in the administration of the sport. In 2004, he was appointed the GB Hockey board president. In 2007 he resigned his presidency from Great Britain Hockey.

Outside of hockey, he was a physical education teacher in Worcestershire before changing career and becoming an independent financial advisor.
