= 1987–88 England Hockey League season =

English field hockey season

1987–88 England Hockey League

The 1987–88 English Hockey League season took place from September 1987 until May 1988.

The season culminated in the National Inter League Championship for men which brought together the winners of their respective regions. The championship was won by Southgate.

The Men's Hockey Association Cup was won by Southgate and the Women's Cup (National Club Championship finals) was won by Ealing.

== Men's National Inter League Championship finals ==
(Held at Prescot, April 30 - May 1)

=== Group A ===
Team 1	Team 2	Score
Stourport	Warrington	1–0
Warrington	Isca	2-2
Isca	Stourport	1–3

Pos	Team	P	W	D	L	F	A	Pts
1	Stourport	2	2	0	0	4	1	6
2	Warrington	2	0	1	1	2	3	1
3	Isca	2	0	1	1	3	5	1

=== Group B ===
Team 1	Team 2	Score
Old Loughtonians	East Grinstead	1–3
East Grinstead	Southgate	0–2
Southgate	Old Loughtonians	2–1

Pos	Team	P	W	D	L	F	A	Pts
1	Southgate	2	2	0	0	4	1	6
2	East Grinstead	2	1	0	1	3	3	3
3	Old Loughtonians	2	0	0	2	2	5	0

= Qualified for semi-finals

=== Semi-finals & Final ===
Round	Team 1	Team 2	Score
Semi-final	Southgate	Warrington	3–0
Semi-final	Stourport	East Grinstead	2–1
Final	Southgate	Stourport	6–0

Southgate
David Owen (gk), Peter Boxell, Richard Dodds, Mark Donnelly, Soma Singh, Andy Western, Paul Moulton, John Shaw, David Thomas, Steve Batchelor, Sean Kerly (capt)
Stourport
Steve Taylor (gk), J Lee (capt), P Lee, M Reason, A Watson, D Shepherd, Mark Harradine, John McPhun, Imran Sherwani, Malcolm Evans, David Knott

== Men's Cup (Hockey Association Cup) ==
=== Quarter-finals ===
Team 1	Team 2	Score
Warrington	Hounslow	1-6
St Albans	Southgate	0-1
Havant	Coventry & North Warwickshire	3-2 aet
Slough	Welton	2-0

=== Semi-finals ===
Team 1	Team 2	Score
Southgate	Slough	3-1
Hounslow	Havant	4-0 aet

=== Final ===
(Held at Canterbury on 14 March)

Team 1	Team 2	Score
Southgate	Hounslow	2-1

Southgate
David Owen (gk), Richard Dodds, Mike Spray, James Duthie, Robert Clift, John Shaw, Soma Singh, Steve Batchelor, Paul Moulton (Rupert Welch sub), David Thomas, Sean Kerly
Hounslow
Veryan Pappin (gk), I Meakins, Dave Dixon, Guy Swayne, Jon Potter, David Hacker, Nick Gordon, Jon Rees, Robert Thompson, Tony Diamond, Martyn Grimley

== Women's Cup (National Club Championship finals) ==
(Held at Coventry School, Coundon, April 23–24)

=== Final ===
Team 1	Team 2	Score
Ealing	Hightown	1–0

=== Final Placings ===
Pos	Team
1	Ealing
2	Hightown
3	Sutton Coldfield
4	Slough
5	Ipswich
6	Leicester
7	Clifton
8	Yate & South Gloucester
9	Orpington
10	Great Harwood
