= David Aldridge (field hockey) =

British field hockey player (born 1951)

Personal information
- Born: Q2.1951 Norwich, England

Sport
- Sport: Field hockey
- Position: Inside left
Senior career
Years	Team	Caps	Goals
1969–1971	UWIST	-	-
1973–1978	Southgate	-	-
National team
Years	Team	Caps	Goals
–	Great Britain		-
–	England		-

David C. Aldridge (born Q2.1951) is a former British hockey international.

== Biography ==
Aldridge was born into a hockey family, his father Clem being President of the Norwich Union Hockey Club. He studied at the University of Wales Institute of Science and Technology and while there played hockey for them.

He joined Southgate Hockey Club in the Men's England Hockey League and while at Southgate he represented England at the 1973 Men's Hockey World Cup in Amstelveen.

He was also selected by England for the 1975 Men's Hockey World Cup in Kuala Lumpur.

He was part of the Southgate team that won the EuroHockey Club Champions Cup for three successive years in 1976, 1977 and 1978. Additionally he won two domestic league titles and the Hockey Association Cup.
