= Alistair McGinn =

British field hockey player (born 1952)

Personal information
- Born: Q4.1952 Wandsworth, London, England

Sport
- Sport: Field hockey
- Position: Midfielder
Senior career
Years	Team	Caps	Goals
1973–1974	St Lukes	-	-
1974–1992	Southgate	-	-
National team
Years	Team	Caps	Goals
–	England & Great Britain		-

Alistair Kirk McGinn (born Q4.1952) is a former British hockey international.

== Biography ==
McGinn was educated at Dane Court Grammar School and played club hockey for St Luke's College, Exeter in Devon. He was a physical education teacher at Slough Grammar School.

He signed to play for Southgate Hockey Club in the Men's England Hockey League and won back to back league titles with the club in 1976–77 and 1977–78.

He was part of the Southgate team that won the EuroHockey Club Champions Cup for three successive years in 1976, 1977 and 1978.

Still at Southgate he was selected by England for the 1978 Men's Hockey World Cup. He continued to play for Southgate and was a member of their veteran team.

His brother Ian McGinn played for England and his nephew (twin brother Gordon's son) Oliver played hockey for Chelmsford Hockey Club.
