= David Owen (field hockey) =

British field hockey player

Sport
- Sport: Field hockey
- Position: Goalkeeper
Senior career
Years	Team	Caps	Goals
1970–1973	Stourport	-	-
1973–1985	Southgate	-	-
National team
Years	Team	Caps	Goals
–	Great Britain		-
Medal record
Field hockey
Representing Great Britain
Champions Trophy
Bronze medal – third place	1978 Lahore	Team

David J. Owen is a former hockey international who represented Great Britain and England. He was selected for the 1980 Summer Olympics.

== Biography ==
Owen was educated at Loughborough College. and played club hockey for Stourport Hockey Club and represented Worcestershire at county level.

In 1971 he was capped by the England U23 team and introduced Ian Taylor to hockey.

In 1973, he left Stourport to join Southgate Hockey Club, where he helped the team dominate English club hockey, winning the National Clubs Championship during the 1973–74 and 1974–75 seasons, the Inter League Championship in 1976–77 and 1977–78, in addition to being part of the team that won the EuroHockey Club Champions Cup for three successive years in 1976, 1977 and 1978.

Owen was part of the bronze-medal winning Great Britain team that competed at the inaugural 1978 Men's Hockey Champions Trophy, in Lahore, Pakistan.

Owen went to his second Champions Trophy in 1980 and was selected for the Great Britain team for the 1980 Olympic Games in Moscow, but subsequently did not attend due to the boycott.
