= James Neale (field hockey) =

British field hockey player (born 1945)

Jimmy Neale
Personal information
- Born: Q4.1945 Colchester, England

Sport
- Sport: Field hockey
Senior career
Years	Team	Caps	Goals
1966	Colchester	-	-
1968–1978	Southgate	-	-
National team
Years	Team	Caps	Goals
–	Great Britain		-
–	England	42	-

James N. Neale (born Q4.1945) is a former British hockey international and convicted drug smuggler.

== Biography ==
While paying for Colchester, Neale played for the England U23 squad in 1966.

Neale primarily played club hockey for Southgate Hockey Club in the Men's England Hockey League.

While at Southgate he played for England at the 1973 Men's Hockey World Cup in Amstelveen, captained England and was selected by England for the 1975 Men's Hockey World Cup in Kuala Lumpur.

He was part of the Southgate team that won the EuroHockey Club Champions Cup for three successive years in 1976, 1977 and 1978.

In 1980, Neale a lawyer by trade, was struck off the Law Society for breaking accounting rules.

In 2002, Neale was convicted of smuggling 270,000 ecstasy tablets into Australia. He received a life sentence, which was later reduced to 15 years.
