= Tony Ekins =

British hockey player

Personal information
- Born: 4 January 1944 (age 82) Bovey Tracey, Devon, England
- Height: 185 cm (6 ft 1 in)
- Weight: 82 kg (181 lb)

Sport
- Sport: Field hockey
- Position: Centre half
Senior career
Years	Team	Caps	Goals
1965–1966	Cambridge Nomads	-	-
1966–1978	Southgate	-	-
National team
Years	Team	Caps	Goals
–	Great Britain		-
–	England		-

Anthony Howard Ekins (born 4 January 1944) is a British field hockey player who competed at the 1968 Summer Olympics and the 1972 Summer Olympics.

== Biography ==
While paying for Cambridge Nomads, Ekins played for the England U23 squad in 1966. He joined Southgate Hockey Club and represented Great Britain at the 1968 Olympic Games in Mexico City.

Ekins went to his second Olympics in 1972 when he represented Great Britain in Munich.

He was part of the Southgate Hockey Club team that won the EuroHockey Club Champions Cup for three successive years in 1976, 1977 and 1978.

Ekins was the England manager during the 1978 Men's Hockey World Cup.
