= Michael Crowe (field hockey) =

British hockey player (born 1942)

Personal information
- Born: 14 August 1942 (age 84) Surrey, England
- Height: 181 cm (5 ft 11 in)
- Weight: 72 kg (159 lb)

Sport
- Sport: Field hockey
- Position: Forward
Senior career
Years	Team	Caps	Goals
1964–1967	Tulse Hill	-	-
1967–1978	Southgate	-	-
National team
Years	Team	Caps	Goals
–	England & Great Britain		-

Michael John Brook Crowe (born 14 August 1942) is a British former field hockey player. He competed in the men's tournament at the 1972 Summer Olympics.

== Biography ==
Crowe played club hockey for Tulse Hill and made his England debut in 1965.

After joining Southgate Hockey Club in 1968, Crowe would go on to appear at the Olympics and would captain England during their 1973 Men's Hockey World Cup campaign.

He was part of the Southgate team that won the EuroHockey Club Champions Cup for three successive years in 1976, 1977 and 1978.
