= Andy Western =

Welsh field hockey player

Personal information
- Born: 1956 (age 69–70) Surrey

Sport
- Sport: Field hockey
Senior career
Years	Team	Caps	Goals
1976–1977	Cambridge University	-	-
1978–1988	Southgate	-	-
National team
Years	Team	Caps	Goals
–	Wales		-
–	Great Britain		-
Medal record
Field hockey
Representing Great Britain
Champions Trophy
Bronze medal – third place	1978 Lahore	Team

Andy Western (born 1956) is a former hockey international player, who represented Wales and Great Britain.

== Biography ==
Western studied at St Catharine's College, Cambridge and was already a Welsh international by the time he entered the University of Cambridge.

After University, Western played club hockey for Southgate Hockey Club and was part of the Southgate team that won the EuroHockey Club Champions Cup in 1978, which was the club's third successive victory .

Western was part of the bronze medal winning Great Britain team that competed at the inaugural 1978 Men's Hockey Champions Trophy, in Lahore, Pakistan. He was a surprise exclusion from the initial 22-strong squad for the Great Britain team for the 1980 Olympic Games in Moscow, which subsequently did not feature a British hockey team due to the boycott.

Still at Southgate, he helped the team win the Hockey Association Cup during the 1986–87 season and the league title during the 1987–88 season and represented Wales at the 1987 Men's EuroHockey Nations Championship.
