= Bernie Cotton =

British field hockey player

Personal information
- Born: 30 June 1948 (age 78) Hitchin, England
- Height: 180 cm (5 ft 11 in)
- Weight: 73 kg (161 lb)

Sport
- Sport: Field hockey
- Position: Wing half
Senior career
Years	Team	Caps	Goals
1970–1971	Cambridge University	-	-
1971–1980	Southgate	-	-
National team
Years	Team	Caps	Goals
1970-1978	England	73	-
1970-1978	Great Britain	54	-
Medal record
Field hockey
Representing Great Britain
Champions Trophy
Bronze medal – third place	1978 Lahore	Team competition

Bernard James Cotton MBE (born 30 June 1948) is a field hockey coach and former player and captain. He won 73 caps for England and 54 for Great Britain, representing the country at the 1972 Summer Olympics. He went on to serve as Great Britain's assistant manager at the 1988 Summer Olympics, where the team won a gold medal, and as manager at the 1992 Summer Olympics, where they finished sixth.

== Biography ==
Having gained a degree in Geography at Fitzwilliam College, Cambridge, where he became the captain of the Cambridge hockey team. He worked as a geography teacher at Bishop's Stortford College for six years in the late 1960s and 1970 and then taught at Bedford School before returning to Bishop's Stortford College during the 1990s. He left the school to work as a performance director for the British Olympic Association, later becoming Performance Manager. In 2009 he was appointed MBE for services to sports.

Cotton initially played club hockey for Cambridge University, becoming captain of both Cambridge and England in 1970. and then joined Southgate Hockey Club in the Men's England Hockey League. He was part of the Southgate team that won the EuroHockey Club Champions Cup for three successive years in 1976, 1977 and 1978.

Cotton captained the England team at both the 1975 Men's Hockey World Cup in Kuala Lumpur and at the 1978 Men's Hockey World Cup in Buenos Aires. He was part of and also captained the bronze medal winning Great Britain team that competed at the inaugural 1978 Men's Hockey Champions Trophy, in Lahore, Pakistan.

Cotton was selected as captain for the Great Britain team for the 1980 Olympic Games in Moscow, but subsequently did not attend due to the boycott.
