= Ian McGinn =

British field hockey player (born 1946)

Personal information
- Born: October 1946 (age 79–80) Lewisham, London, England

Sport
- Sport: Field hockey
Senior career
Years	Team	Caps	Goals
1966–1969	St Luke's	-	-
1969–1982	Southgate	-	-
National team
Years	Team	Caps	Goals
1975-1976	Great Britain	19	-
1968-1978	England	54	-

Ian Stuart McGinn (born October 1946) is a former British hockey international.

== Biography ==
McGinn was educated at Chatham House Grammar School and played club for St Luke's College, Exeter in Devon and represented Essex at county level

He signed to play for Southgate Hockey Club in the Men's England Hockey League and while there was selected by England for the 1975 Men's Hockey World Cup in Kuala Lumpur.

He was part of the Southgate team that won the EuroHockey Club Champions Cup for three successive years in 1976, 1977 and 1978, won back to back league titles with the club in 1976–77 and 1977–78. before going to his second World Cup with England for the 1978 Men's Hockey World Cup.

McGinn won the Men's Cup with Southgate during the 1981–82 season.

At international retirement McGinn had earned 19 caps for Great Britain.

His brother Alistair McGinn played for England and his nephew Oliver played hockey for Chelmsford Hockey Club.
