= Mark Gleghorne =

Great Britain hockey international

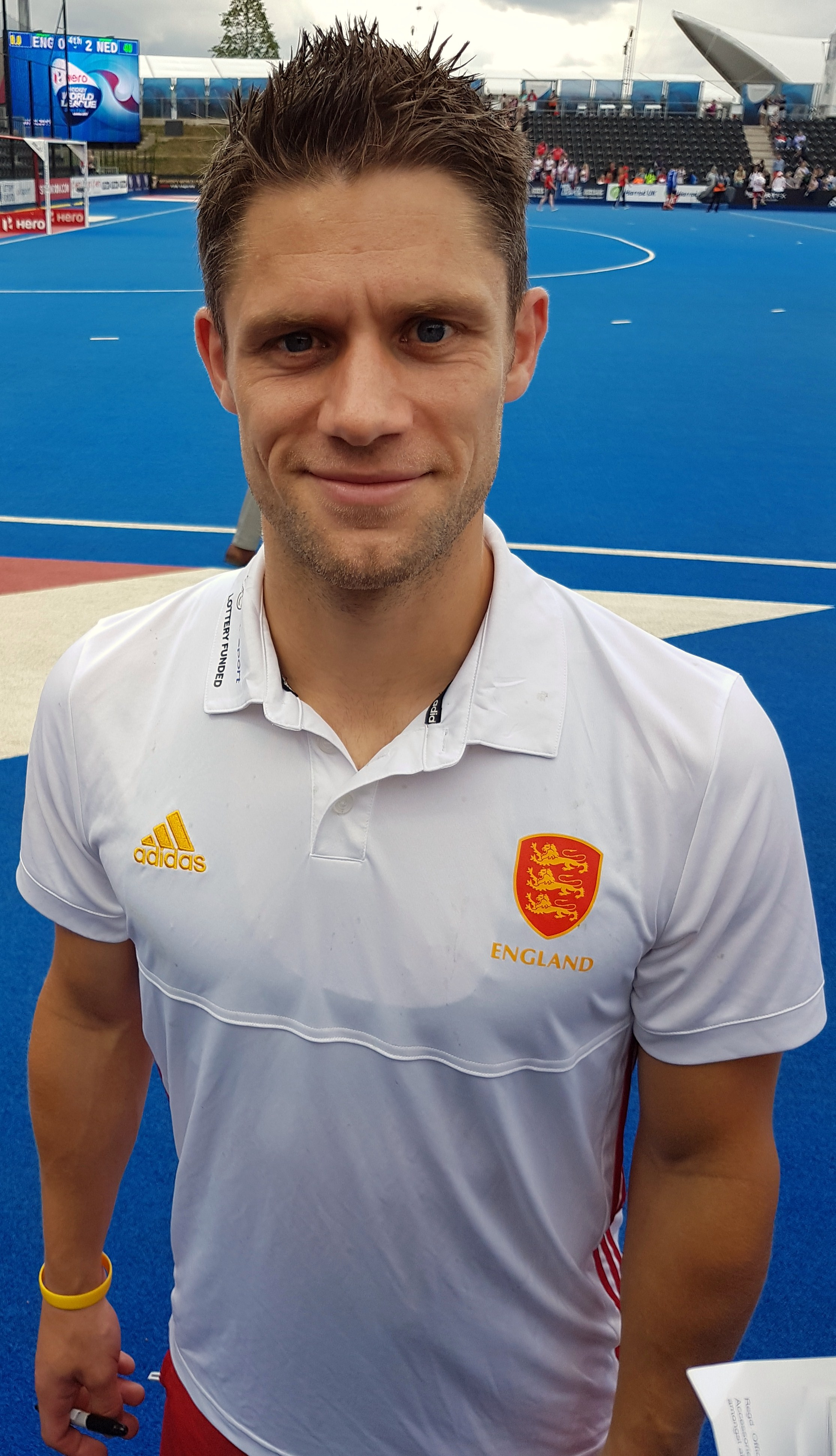

Personal information
- Born: 19 May 1985 (age 41) Ballymena, County Antrim; Northern Ireland
- Height: 180 cm (5 ft 11 in)

Sport
- Sport: Field hockey
- Position: Midfielder/Wing-back
Youth career
- Years: Team
- 1996–2003: RBAI
Senior career
Years	Team	Caps	Goals
200?–2004	Instonians	-	-
2004–2007	Loughborough	-	-
2008–2009	Instonians	-	-
2009	→ Ulster	-	-
2009–2010	HC Den Bosch	-	-
2010–2011	Loughborough	-	-
2011–2015	East Grinstead	-	-
2014	→ Mumbai Magicians	-	-
2015–2019	Beeston	-	-
2016–2017	→ Punjab Warriors	-	-
2019–2020	Holcombe	-	-
2020–2023	Instonians	-	-
National team
Years	Team	Caps	Goals
2004–2008	Ireland	80	-
2011–2020	Great Britain	52	-
2012–2020	England	112	-
Medal record
Representing England
Commonwealth Games
Bronze medal – third place	2014 Glasgow	Team
Bronze medal – third place	2018 Gold Coast	Team
European Championships
Bronze medal – third place	2017 Amstelveen	Team
World League
Bronze medal – third place	2014 New Delhi	Team

Mark Gleghorne (born 19 May 1985) is a field hockey player from Northern Ireland who has represented Ireland, England and Great Britain at international level. He represented Great Britain at the 2016 Summer Olympics. Gleghorne was a member of the England teams that won the bronze medals at the 2014 and 2018 Commonwealth Games and at the 2017 Men's EuroHockey Nations Championship. He also represented England at the 2014 and 2018 Men's Hockey World Cups. At club level, Gleghorne was a member of the Instonians team that won the Irish Senior Cup in both 2002 and 2004. He was also a member of the Punjab Warriors team that won the 2016 Hockey India League title.

== Early years, family and education ==
Gleghorne was born into a field hockey family. His father, Andy, was a player and club secretary at Antrim Hockey Club while his mother, Anne, played with and coached Randalstown. Anne Gleghorne died in 2003. His younger brother, Paul, is an Ireland international. Two of his aunts, Margaret Gleghorne and Jackie McWilliams, were also Ireland and Great Britain women's internationals. Between 1996 and 2003 he attended Royal Belfast Academical Institution. Between 2004 and 2007 he attended Loughborough University and gained a degree in Sport Science. He is also a qualified PE teacher. In addition to field hockey, in his youth Gleghorne played association football, rugby union and cricket. He played cricket for Muckamore Cricket Club and was also member of Ireland teams that won under-15 and under-17 European championships in 2000 and 2001. His teammates included, among others, Eoin Morgan, William Porterfield, Kevin O'Brien, Boyd Rankin and Gary Wilson.

== Domestic teams ==
=== RBAI ===
In 2002–03 Gleghorne captained the Royal Belfast Academical Institution team that won the Burney Cup and finished as runners-up in the All Ireland Schoolboys Hockey Championship. His teammates included Michael Watt.

=== Instonians ===
Gleghorne began playing for Instonians while still attending RBAI. His teammates at Instonians included his brother, Paul. Gleghorne was a member of the Instonians team that won the Irish Senior Cup in both 2002 and 2004. In the 2002 final, against Pembroke Wanderers, he scored a bizarre goal. His shot was originally going wide before it rebounded off an umpire. In the 2004 final Instonians defeated Cork Harlequins. After graduating from Loughborough University, he re-joined Instonians for the 2008–09 season. While playing for Instonians, Gleghorne also represented Ulster at interprovincial level.

=== Men's England Hockey League ===
Gleghorne has played for several clubs in the Men's England Hockey League. While attending Loughborough University between 2004 and 2007, he played for Loughborough Students' Hockey Club. After spending the 2009–10 season playing for HC Den Bosch in the Hoofdklasse, he re-joined Loughborough. He subsequently joined East Grinstead, representing the club in the 2014–15 Euro Hockey League. In 2015 he moved to Beeston. In 2019 he started playing for Holcombe.

=== Hockey India League ===
Gleghorne has also played in the Hockey India League. In 2014 he played for Mumbai Magicians. At the 2014 auction he was initially selected as a replacement. However, due to injuries he was subsequently called up to play the season. He loved playing in India because of the nice weather The 2016 and 2017 seasons saw him play for Punjab Warriors. He helped Warriors win the 2016 title.

== International ==
=== Ireland ===
Between 2004 and 2008 Gleghorne made 80 senior appearances for Ireland. He was a member of the Ireland team that won the 2005 Men's EuroHockey Nations Trophy. He also represented Ireland at the 2006 Men's Intercontinental Cup and at the 2007 Men's EuroHockey Nations Championship. At the 2008 Men's Field Hockey Olympic Qualifier he finished the tournament as top scorer. In 2009 Gleghorne informed the Irish Hockey Association that he was switching allegiances from Ireland to England/Great Britain.

=== Great Britain ===
Having previously played for Ireland, Gleghorne had to wait for three years before he was eligible to play for Great Britain. He eventually made his debut for Great Britain in November 2011, scoring in a 3–1 win against Belgium. He subsequently represented Great Britain at the 2016 Summer Olympics and when they won the 2017 Sultan Azlan Shah Cup.

=== England ===
Gleghorne was a member of the England teams that won the bronze medals at the 2014 and 2018 Commonwealth Games. He was also a member of the England team that won the bronze at the 2017 Men's EuroHockey Nations Championship, scoring in the third place play-off against Germany. Gleghorne also represented England at the 2014 and 2018 Men's Hockey World Cups.

Tournaments	Place	Team
2005 Men's EuroHockey Nations Trophy	1st	Ireland
2006 Men's Intercontinental Cup	8th	Ireland
2007 Men's EuroHockey Nations Championship	7th	Ireland
2008 Men's Field Hockey Olympic Qualifier	4th	Ireland
2011 Men's Hockey Champions Trophy	6th	Great Britain
2012 Men's Hockey Champions Trophy	2nd	England
2012–13 Men's FIH Hockey World League Semifinals	3rd	England
2012–13 Men's FIH Hockey World League Final	3rd	England
2014 Men's Four Nations Cup	4th	England
2014 Men's Hockey World Cup	4th	England
2014 Men's Hockey Investec Cup	1st	England
2014 Commonwealth Games	3rd place, bronze medalist(s)	England
2014 Men's Hockey Champions Trophy	7th	England
2014–15 Men's FIH Hockey World League Semifinals	3rd	Great Britain
2014–15 Men's FIH Hockey World League Final	6th	Great Britain
2015 Men's EuroHockey Nations Championship	4th	England
2016 Men's Hockey Champions Trophy	4th	Great Britain
2016 Men's Four Nations Cup	2nd	Great Britain
2016 Summer Olympics	9th	Great Britain
2017 Sultan Azlan Shah Cup	1st	Great Britain
2016–17 Men's FIH Hockey World League Semifinals	3rd	England
2016–17 Men's FIH Hockey World League Final	8th	England
2017 Men's EuroHockey Nations Championship	3rd place, bronze medalist(s)	England
2018 Sultan Azlan Shah Cup	2nd	England
2018 Commonwealth Games	3rd place, bronze medalist(s)	England
2018 Men's Hockey World Cup	4th	England
2019 Men's FIH Pro League		Great Britain

== Honours ==
Great Britain

- Sultan Azlan Shah Cup
  - Winners: 2017
- Men's Four Nations Cup
  - Runners up: 2016

England

- Men's Hockey Investec Cup
  - Winners: 2014
- Sultan Azlan Shah Cup
  - Runners up: 2018
- Hockey Champions Trophy
  - Runners up: 2012

Ireland

- Men's EuroHockey Nations Trophy
  - Winners: 2005

Punjab Warriors

- Hockey India League
  - Winners: 2016: 1

Instonians

- Irish Senior Cup
  - Winners: 2001–02, 2003–04: 2

RBAI

- Burney Cup
  - Winners: 2002–03: 1
- All Ireland Schoolboys Hockey Championship
  - Runners up: 2002–03: 1
