= David Whitaker (field hockey) =

British field hockey player (born 1948)

Personal information
- Born: August 1948 (age 77–78) St Albans, England

Sport
- Sport: Field hockey
Senior career
| Years | Team | Caps | Goals |
| 1969–1971 | Loughborough Colleges | - | - |
| 1972–1973 | Blueharts | - | - |
| 1973–1979 | Southgate | - | - |
National team
| Years | Team | Caps | Goals |
| – | England & Great Britain | | - |
Medal record
Men's field hockey
Representing Great Britain
Olympic Games
| Gold medal – first place | 1988 Seoul | Team |
| Bronze medal – third place | 1984 Los Angeles | Team |
Representing England
European Championship
| Bronze medal – third place | 1995 Dublin | Team |

David Brian Whitaker (born August 1948) is a former British hockey international and was the coach for Great Britain at the 1984 Summer Olympics and the 1988 Summer Olympics.

== Biography ==
After spells at Loughborough Colleges and Blueharts and while with the latter played in the 1973 Men's Hockey World Cup. Whitaker then played club hockey for Southgate Hockey Club in the Men's England Hockey League and became their club captain.

While at Southgate he was selected by England for the 1975 Men's Hockey World Cup in Kuala Lumpur and the Great Britain squad for the 1976 Summer Olympics but the team failed to qualify for the latter.

He won the 1976–77 and 1977–78 league titles and played in the 1978 Men's Hockey World Cup in Buenos Aires. He was also part of the Southgate team that won the EuroHockey Club Champions Cup for three successive years in 1976, 1977 and 1978. He was selected for the Great Britain team for the 1980 Olympic Games in Moscow, but subsequently did not attend due to the boycott.

In 1980 the Great Britain manager Roger Self appointed Whitaker to be his head coach and the pair had a successful relationship, including a bronze medal in the 1984 Olympic Games in Los Angeles and the crowning glory of the gold medal win at the 1988 Olympic Games in Seoul.

He was Director of Coaching for the Hockey Association from 1985 and 1989 and was named Coach of the Year in 1985 and 1988. In 1989 he was awarded an O.B.E. in the 1989 New Year Honours and founded Performance Consultants with David Hemery M.B.E. and Sir John Whitmore.

He married fellow Olympic hockey coach Sue Slocombe.
