= Paul Gleghorne =

Ireland men's hockey international

Personal information
- Full name: Paul Gleghorne
- Born: 11 April 1987 (age 39) Ballymena, County Antrim; Northern Ireland
- Height: 187 cm (6 ft 2 in)
- Weight: 82 kg (181 lb)

Sport
- Sport: Field hockey
- Position: Defender
Youth career
- Years: Team
- 19xx–2005: RBAI
Senior career
Years	Team	Caps	Goals
20xx–2006	Instonians	-	-
2006–2009	Loughborough Students	-	-
2009–2015	Instonians	-	-
2015–2018	Lisnagarvey	-	-
2018–	Crefelder HTC	-	-
National team
Years	Team	Caps	Goals
2009–	Ireland	200+	-
Medal record
Representing Ireland
EuroHockey Championships
Bronze medal – third place	2015 London

Paul Gleghorne (born 11 April 1987) is an Ireland men's field hockey international. He was a member of the Ireland team that won the bronze medal at the 2015 Men's EuroHockey Nations Championship. He also represented Ireland at the 2016 Summer Olympics and the 2018 Men's Hockey World Cup. At club level, he has won the Men's Irish Hockey League with Lisnagarvey. Gleghorne comes from a family of field hockey internationals. His older brother, Mark, has played for Ireland, England and Great Britain. Two of his aunts, Margaret Gleghorne and Jackie McWilliams, were also Ireland and Great Britain women's internationals.

== Early years, family and education ==
Gleghorne was born into a field hockey family. His father, Andy, was a player and club secretary at Antrim Hockey Club while his mother, Anne, played with and coached Randalstown. Anne Gleghorne died in 2003. His older brother, Mark, has played for Ireland, England and Great Britain. Two of his aunts, Margaret Gleghorne and Jackie McWilliams, were also Ireland and Great Britain women's internationals. He completed his secondary level education at Royal Belfast Academical Institution. Between 2006 and 2009 he attended Loughborough University where he gained a first class honours degree in Accounting and Financial Management. Between 2010 and 2014 he completed his accountancy training with Chartered Accountants Ireland.

== Domestic teams ==
=== RBAI ===
In 2003–04, together with Michael Watt and John Jackson, Gleghorne was a member of the Royal Belfast Academical Institution team that won the McCullough Cup, the Burney Cup and the All Ireland Schoolboys Hockey Championship. He played in the McCullough Cup final just hours after the death of his mother, Anne.

=== Instonians ===
In 2003–04, together with his brother, Mark, and Michael Watt, Gleghorne was a member of the Instonians team that won the Irish Senior Cup, defeating Cork Harlequins 1–0 in the final. After graduating from Loughborough University, Gleghorne re-joined Instonians before subsequently moving on to Lisnagarvey.

=== Loughborough Students ===
While attending Loughborough University between 2006 and 2009, Gleghorne played for Loughborough Students' Hockey Club. He also played for Loughborough in the 2007–08 Euro Hockey League.

=== Lisnagarvey ===
In 2015 Gleghorne began playing for Lisnagarvey. In 2015–16, along with Jonathan Bell, Sean Murray and Michael Watt, Gleghorne was a member of the Lisnagarvey team that won the Men's Irish Hockey League and the EY Champions Trophy. Gleghorne and Lisnagarvey also reached the final of the 2015–16 Irish Senior Cup but lost to Monkstown after a penalty shoot-out. Gleghorne also played for Lisnagarvey in the 2016–17 Euro Hockey League.

=== Crefelder HTC ===
In 2018 Gleghorne began playing for Crefelder HTC in the Feldhockey Bundesliga. Together with Neal Glassey and Michael Robson, he was one of three Lisnagarvey players to move to Crefelder HTC.

== Ireland international ==
Gleghorne made his senior Ireland debut in June 2009 in a Celtic Cup match against France. Gleghorne and his fellow debutant, Chris Cargo, both scored in a 3–1 win for Ireland. Gleghorne was a member of the Ireland team that won the 2011 Men's Hockey Champions Challenge II. He also helped Ireland win Men's FIH Hockey World League tournaments in 2012, 2015 and 2017. Gleghorne was also a member of the Ireland team that won the bronze medal at the 2015 Men's EuroHockey Nations Championship. He also represented Ireland at the 2016 Summer Olympics In June 2017 he was a member of the Ireland team that won the Hamburg Masters, defeating Germany 4–2 in the final. In May 2018, Gleghorne made his 200th senior appearance for Ireland in a 1–1 with Germany and later in the year played in the 2018 Men's Hockey World Cup.

Tournaments	Place
2009 Men's Hockey World Cup Qualifiers	3rd
2011 Men's Hockey Champions Challenge II	1st
2011 Men's EuroHockey Nations Championship	5th
2012 Men's Field Hockey Olympic Qualifier	2nd
2012–13 Men's FIH Hockey World League Round 1	1st
2012 Men's Hockey Champions Challenge I	3rd
2012–13 Men's FIH Hockey World League Round 2	2nd
2012–13 Men's FIH Hockey World League Semifinals	7th
2014 Men's Hockey Champions Challenge I	4th
2014 Men's Hockey Investec Cup	2nd
2014–15 Men's FIH Hockey World League Round 2	1st
2014–15 Men's FIH Hockey World League Semifinals	5th
2015 Men's EuroHockey Nations Championship	3rd place, bronze medalist(s)
2016 Summer Olympics	10th
2016–17 Men's FIH Hockey World League Round 2	1st
2017 Hamburg Masters	1st
2016–17 Men's FIH Hockey World League Semifinals	5th
2017 Men's EuroHockey Nations Championship	6th
2018 Sultan Azlan Shah Cup	6th
2018 Men's Four Nations Cup	4th
2018 Men's Hockey World Cup	14th
2018–19 Men's FIH Series Finals	2nd
2019 Men's EuroHockey Nations Championship	8th

== Employment ==
Between 2010 and 2014, Gleghorne trained as a chartered accountant with KPMG. He subsequently worked for the Viridian Group from 2014 to 2015. He again worked for KPMG from 2015 to 2017. In February 2018 he was appointed senior manager in the corporate finance team of the Belfast-based HNH Group.

== Honours ==
Ireland

- Hamburg Masters
  - Winners: 2017
- Men's FIH Hockey World League Round 1
  - Winners: 2012 Cardiff
- Men's FIH Hockey World League Round 2
  - Winners: 2015 San Diego, 2017 Belfast
  - Runners up: 2013 New Delhi
- Men's FIH Series Finals
  - Runners up: 2019 Le Touquet
- Men's Hockey Champions Challenge II
  - Winners: 2011
- Men's Field Hockey Olympic Qualifier
  - Runners up: 2012
- Men's Hockey Investec Cup
  - Runners up: 2014

Lisnagarvey

- Men's Irish Hockey League
  - Winners: 2015–16: 1
- EY Champions Trophy
  - Winners: 2016: 1
- Irish Senior Cup
  - Runners up: 2015–16: 1

Instonians

- Irish Senior Cup
  - Winners: 2003–04: 1

RBAI

- All Ireland Schoolboys Hockey Championship
  - Winners: 2003–04: 1
- Burney Cup
  - Winners: 2003–04: 1
- McCullough Cup
  - Winners: 2003–04: 1
