= Lisnagarvey Hockey Club =

Field hockey club in Northern Ireland

- Union: Hockey Ireland → Ulster Hockey Union
- Full name: Lisnagarvey Hockey Club
- Nickname(s): Garvey
- Founded: 1901
- Ground: 2 Comber Road; Hillsborough, County Down; Northern Ireland
- Coach: Erroll Lutton
- Website: lisnagarveyhockey.com
- League: Men's Irish Hockey League → Ulster Senior League

Lisnagarvey Hockey Club is a field hockey club based in Hillsborough, County Down, Northern Ireland. The club was founded in 1901 and was originally based in Lisburn. The club was named after Lisnagarvey, the townland that eventually expanded into Lisburn. The club's senior men's team plays in the Men's Irish Hockey League, the Men's Irish Senior Cup, the Kirk Cup and the Anderson Cup. They have previously played in the Ulster Senior League. The men's reserve team plays in the Men's Irish Junior Cup. Lisnagarvey has also represented Ireland in European competitions, winning the 1991 EuroHockey Club Trophy. Lisnagarvey also fields various men's and women's teams in junior, senior and veterans leagues and cup competitions affiliated to the Ulster Hockey Union.

== History ==
=== Early years ===
Lisnagarvey Hockey Club was founded in September 1901, following a meeting held at the Temperance Institute on Railway Street, Lisburn. An earlier Lisburn Hockey Club was founded in 1897 so the new club was named after Lisnagarvey, the townland that eventually expanded into Lisburn. In 1903–04 the club joined a league for the first time and in 1904–05 the club won its first trophy, the Mulholland Shield. In 1905–06 Lisnagarvey reached the final of the Irish Junior Cup. After the first game against Monkstown finished 2–2 after extra time, they lost the replay 5–0. In 1922–23 Lisnagarvey won their first senior trophy when they won the Anderson Cup, defeating Antrim in the final. In 1924–25 Lisnagarvey won a quartet of trophies. In addition to winning the Anderson Cup for a second time, they also won the Irish Senior Cup, the Kirk Cup and the Ulster Senior League, all for the first time.

=== Men's Irish Senior Cup ===
Lisnagarvey is the Irish Senior Cup's most successful team. They won the cup for the first time in 1924–25, defeating Limerick PMYA over three games. Between 1987–88 and 1993–94 with a team that included Jimmy Kirkwood, Lisnagarvey won the cup for seven successive seasons.

Season	Winners	Score	Runners up	Captain
1924–25	Lisnagarvey	3–0 (Note: 2nd Replay - Game 1: 0-0 3 periods of extra time; Game 2: 1-1 4 periods of extra time.)	Limerick PYMA	L. Alderdice
1926–27	Lisnagarvey	2–1 (Note: After extra time)	Railway & Steam Packet Union	R. T. S. Bailey
1940–41	Lisnagarvey	(Note: Bad weather originally delayed the final and when a date was eventually arranged it was again cancelled following the Belfast Blitz. A number of Lisnagarvey players served as A.R.P.s and were unable to travel to the final. The Irish Hockey Union and Limerick PMYA both agreed the trophy should be shared.)	Limerick PYMA	Jack Bowden
1942–43	Dublin University	5–0	Lisnagarvey	
1944–45	Lisnagarvey	2–1	Dublin University	D. G. Paul
1945–46	Lisnagarvey	4–3 (Note: After extra time.)	YMCA (Dublin)	D. G. Paul
1948–49	YMCA (Dublin)	1–0	Lisnagarvey	
1950–51	Lisnagarvey	2–1	YMCA (Dublin)	James Corken
1951–52	Lisnagarvey	4–3 (Note: After extra time.)	Pembroke Wanderers	James Corken
1957–58	Lisnagarvey	2–0	Dublin University	Steven Johnson
1958–59	Three Rock Rovers	1–0	Lisnagarvey	
1959–60	Lisnagarvey	4–3	Three Rock Rovers	D. McClements
1961–62	Lisnagarvey	0–0 (Note: Three Rock Rovers and Lisnagarvey shared the trophy shared after two replays. First game finished 2–2; Second game finished 1–1.)	Three Rock Rovers	R. B. Shaw
1965–66	Lisnagarvey	3–0	Pembroke Wanderers	Wally Mercer
1969–70	Lisnagarvey	1–0 (Note: After extra time.)	Monkstown	Michael Bowden
1970–71	Lisnagarvey	2–1 (Note: After 2 periods of extra time.)	Cork Church of Ireland	D. McClements
1977–78	YMCA (Dublin)	1–0	Lisnagarvey	
1980–81	Queen's University	1–0	Lisnagarvey	
1987–88	Lisnagarvey	3–2	Cookstown	
1988–89	Lisnagarvey	1–0	Avoca	
1989–90	Lisnagarvey	4–0	YMCA (Dublin)	
1990–91	Lisnagarvey	3–0	Cork Harlequins	
1991–92	Lisnagarvey	3–1 (Note: After extra time.)	Holywood '87 (Holywood)	
1992–93	Lisnagarvey	1–0	Avoca	
1993–94	Lisnagarvey	2–0	Banbridge	
1995–96	Avoca	3–2 (Note: After replay and two periods of extra time. First game finished 2–2.)	Lisnagarvey	Robbie Taylor
1996–97	Lisnagarvey	4–3	Pembroke Wanderers	
1999–2000	Pembroke Wanderers	3–3 (Note: After extra time. Pembroke Wanderers won 4–3 on penalties.)	Lisnagarvey	
2002–03	Lisnagarvey	3–2	Cork Harlequins	
2004–05	Lisnagarvey	3–2	Instonians	Errol Lutton
2005–06	Cork Harlequins	2–1	Lisnagarvey	Errol Lutton
2015–16	Monkstown	2–2 (Note: After extra time; Monkstown won 6–5 after a penalty shoot-out.)	Lisnagarvey	
2018–19	Three Rock Rovers	1–0	Lisnagarvey	

=== Ulster Senior League ===
Season	Winners	Score	Runners up
1924–25	Lisnagarvey		
1925–26	Banbridge	3–2	Lisnagarvey
1933–34	Lisnagarvey	3–1	North Down
1937–38	Lisnagarvey		
1938–39	Lisnagarvey		
1944–45	Lisnagarvey		
1949–50	Lisnagarvey	1–0	Parkview
1950–51	Lisnagarvey		
1951–52	Lisnagarvey		
1952–53	Lisnagarvey		
1953–54	Lisnagarvey		Down
1954–55	Lisnagarvey		Parkview
1959–60	Lisnagarvey		
1960–61	Lisnagarvey		
1962–63	Lisnagarvey		
1964–65	Lisnagarvey		Cliftonville
1965–66	Lisnagarvey		
1969–70	Lisnagarvey		
1971–72	Lisnagarvey		
1976–77	Lisnagarvey		
1977–78	Lisnagarvey		
1980–81	Lisnagarvey		
1989–90	Lisnagarvey		
1990–91	Lisnagarvey		
1991–92	Lisnagarvey		
1993–94	Lisnagarvey		
1994–95	Lisnagarvey		
1996–97	Lisnagarvey		
1998–99	Lisnagarvey		
1999–00	Lisnagarvey		
2000–01	Lisnagarvey		
2001–02	Lisnagarvey		
2010–11	Lisnagarvey		

=== Men's Irish Junior Cup ===
In 1905–06 Lisnagarvey reached the final of the Irish Junior Cup for the first time. After the first game against Monkstown finished 2–2 after extra time, they lost the replay 5–0. In 1954–55 Lisnagarvey won the Irish Junior Cup for the first time after defeating UCD 4–0 in the final.

Season	Winners	Score	Runners up	Captain
1905–06	Monkstown II	5–0 (Note: After replay. First game finished 2–2 after extra time.)	Lisnagarvey	
1953–54	YMCA (Dublin) II	2–1 (Note: After extra time.)	Lisnagarvey II	
1954–55	Lisnagarvey II	4–0	UCD	J. Hadden
1955–56	Lisnagarvey II	1–0	North Kildare	M. Christie
1957–58	Lisnagarvey II	1–0	YMCA (Dublin) II	I. Hadden
1958–59	Lisnagarvey II	3–0	Dublin University II	D. Boomer
1959–60	Lisnagarvey II	2–0 (Note: Replay - Game 1: 3–3.)	Dublin University II	A. Bolas
1961–62	Lisnagarvey II	4–1	Waterford YMCA (Waterford)	A. Howard
1962–63	Lisnagarvey II	2–0 (Note: After extra time in replay - Game 1: 1–1.)	Irish Air Corps	J. Reid
1966–67	Lisnagarvey II	1–0	Railway Union II	G. Pelan
1969–70	Lisnagarvey II	1–0 (Note: Replay - Game 1: 0–0.)	Pembroke Wanderers II	I. Wells
1971–72	Lisnagarvey II	3–0	Deighton Wanderers	A. Boyd
1972–73	Lisnagarvey II	4–0	Waterford II (Waterford)	S. Howard
1973–74	Lisnagarvey II	4–0	St Brendan's	S. Howard
1974–75	Railway Union II	3–1 (Note: After extra time)	Lisnagarvey II	S. Howard
1976–77	Lisnagarvey II	3–1	Three Rock Rovers II	
1986–87	Lisnagarvey II			Ian MacDonnell
1988–89	Banbridge II	3–0	Lisnagarvey III	
1989–90	Lisnagarvey II	1–0 (Note: Replay - Game 1: 2–2.)	Holywood '87 II (Holywood)	
1992–93	Cork Church of Ireland II	2–1	Lisnagarvey II	
1998–99	Cork Harlequins II	5–4	Lisnagarvey II	
2000–01	Pembroke Wanderers II	2–1	Lisnagarvey II	
2002–03	Lisnagarvey II	5–0	Kilkenny (Kilkenny)	
2003–04	Annadale II	4–3	Lisnagarvey II	
2010–11	Lisnagarvey II	3–1	Banbridge II	

=== Kirk Cup ===
Season	Winners	Score	Runners up
1922–23	Lisnagarvey	3–0	North Down
1923–24	Lisnagarvey	2–0	Cliftonville
1924–25	Lisnagarvey	1–0	East Antrim
1933–34	Lisnagarvey	5–4	Cliftonville
1936–37	North Down	3–1 (Note: After extra time.)	Lisnagarvey
1938–39	Lisnagarvey	2–1	Antrim
1941–42	Lisnagarvey	2–1	North Down
1942–43	Lisnagarvey	2–0	Banbridge
1944–45	Lisnagarvey	2–1	Short and Harland
1945–46	Lisnagarvey	2–1	Wanderers
1947–48	Lisnagarvey	2–1	Belfast YMCA
1948-49	Portrush	3–1	Lisnagarvey
1952–53	Lisnagarvey		
1953–54	Lisnagarvey	2–1 (Note: After extra time.)	Mossley
1955–56	Lisnagarvey	(Note: Lisnagarvey and Parkview shared the trophy.)	Parkview
1960–61	Lisnagarvey	2–1	Banbridge
1961–62	Lisnagarvey	2–0	Banbridge
1963–64	Lisnagarvey	2–0	Antrim
1965–66	Antrim	1–0	Lisnagarvey
1970–71	Lisnagarvey	(Note: After replay. First game finished 1–1.)	Cliftonville
1972–73	Lisnagarvey	1–0	Friends School Old Boys
1973–74	Lisnagarvey	3–0 (Note: After replay. First game finished 1–1.)	Mossley
1974–75	Instonians	2–1	Lisnagarvey
1977–78	Lisnagarvey	2–0	Belfast YMCA
1979–80	Lisnagarvey	(Note: After replay. First game finished 1–1.)	Instonians
1981–82	Lisnagarvey	1–1 (Note: After replay. First game finished 2–2. Lisnagarvey won 4–2 on penalty strokes.)	Banbridge
1983–84	Mossley	2–0	Lisnagarvey
1984–85	Belfast YMCA	3–0	Lisnagarvey
1989–90	Lisnagarvey	2–0	Banbridge
1990–91	Holywood 87 (Holywood)	2–1 (Note: After replay. First game finished 2–2.)	Lisnagarvey
1991–92	Holywood 87	1–0	Lisnagarvey
1994–95	Lisnagarvey	2–1	Instonians
1995–96	Lisnagarvey	2–0	Newry (Newry)
1996–97	Lisnagarvey	3–2	Instonians
1997–98	Lisnagarvey	2–0	Annadale
1998–99	Lisnagarvey	2–1	Cookstown
1999–2000	Annadale	1–1 (Note: After extra time. Annadale won 3–1 on penalty strokes.)	Lisnagarvey
2000–01	Lisnagarvey	2–1	Annadale
2001–02	Lisnagarvey	2–1	Instonians
2004–05	Instonians	2–2 (Note: Instonians won 5–4 on penalty strokes.)	Lisnagarvey
2006–07	Cookstown	2–1	Lisnagarvey
2007–08	Annadale	3–2	Lisnagarvey
2008–09	Cookstown	4–3 (Note: After extra time.)	Lisnagarvey
2011–12	Lisnagarvey	2–1	Cookstown
2012–13	Cookstown	3–1	Lisnagarvey
2013–14	Annadale	1–1 (Note: After extra time. Annadale won 4–2 on penalty strokes.)	Lisnagarvey

=== Anderson Cup ===
Season	Winners	Score	Runners up
1922–23	Lisnagarvey		Antrim
1924–25	Lisnagarvey	1–0	Cliftonville
1926–27	Banbridge	2–1 (Note: Second replay. First game finished 2–2; Second game/first replay score unknown.)	Lisnagarvey
1933–34	Lisnagarvey	2–1	Banbridge
1934–35	Lisnagarvey	2–1	Antrim
1937–38	Lisnagarvey	3–1	East Antrim
1942–43	Lisnagarvey	3–2	Queen's University
1943–44	Banbridge	1–0	Lisnagarvey
1945–46	Lisnagarvey	3–0	Banbridge
1946–47	Lisnagarvey	(Note: After replay. First game finished 2–2.)	Portrush
1951–52	Lisnagarvey	2–1	Banbridge
1952–53	Antrim	2–1	Lisnagarvey
1953–54	Lisnagarvey	5–2 (Note: After replay. First game finished 0–0.)	Banbridge
1954–55	Lisnagarvey	2–1	Antrim
1955–56	Lisnagarvey	4–2 (Note: After extra time.)	Banbridge
1957–58	Lisnagarvey	1–0 (Note: After two replays. First game finished 0–0. Second game finished 1–1)	Belfast YMCA
1959–60	Lisnagarvey	2–1 (Note: After replay. First game finished 1–1)	Banbridge
1960–61	Lisnagarvey	4–1 (Note: After replay. First game finished 1–1)	Belfast YMCA
1963–64	Lisnagarvey	4–2 (Note: After replay. First game finished 0–0)	Belfast YMCA
1964–65	Portrush	4–1	Lisnagarvey
1975–76	Lisnagarvey	4–0	Instonians
1976–77	Annadale	2–1	Lisnagarvey
1977–78	Instonians	3–2 (Note: After extra time.)	Lisnagarvey
1979–80	Lisnagarvey	1–0	Antrim
1980–81	Lisnagarvey	3–1	Mossley
1986–87	Lisnagarvey	4–2	Banbridge
1993–94	Lisnagarvey	4–0	Banbridge
1995–96	Lisnagarvey	1–0	Annadale
1996–97	Lisnagarvey	2–1	Banbridge
2005–06	Banbridge	2–1	Lisnagarvey
2007–08	Lisnagarvey	2–1 (Note: After extra time.)	Banbridge
2009–10	Banbridge	3–2	Lisnagarvey
2013–14	Cookstown	(Note: Played on a group basis.)	Lisnagarvey
2014–15	Banbridge		Lisnagarvey
2018–19	Lisnagarvey	3–1	Banbridge

=== Men's Irish Hockey League ===
In 2008–09 Lisnagarvey were founder members of the Men's Irish Hockey League.

Regular season

Season	Winners	Score	Runners up
2009–10	Pembroke Wanderers	4–1	Lisnagarvey
2010–11	Banbridge	2–2 (Note: Banbridge win after shoot-out.)	Lisnagarvey
2011–12	Lisnagarvey	3–1	YMCA (Dublin)
2015–16	Lisnagarvey	n/a	
2018–19	Lisnagarvey	n/a	Three Rock Rovers

Notes

EY Champions Trophy

Year	Winners	Score	Runners up
2016	Lisnagarvey	3–1	Banbridge
2019	Three Rock Rovers	2–0	Lisnagarvey

=== Lisnagarvey in Europe ===
Lisnagarvey has also represented Ireland in European competitions. After winning both the 1969–70 Irish Senior Cup and the 1969–70 British Club Championship, Lisnagarvey were invited to play in the 1971 EuroHockey Club Champions Cup. After retaining both the Irish Senior Cup and the British Club Championship in 1970–71, Lisnagarvey were invited to play in the 1972 EuroHockey Club Champions Cup.

Tournaments	Place
1971 EuroHockey Club Champions Cup	8th
1972 EuroHockey Club Champions Cup	10th
1982 EuroHockey Club Champions Cup	7th
1989 EuroHockey Club Trophy	2nd (host)
1990 EuroHockey Club Champions Cup	8th
1991 EuroHockey Club Trophy	1st
1992 EuroHockey Club Champions Cup	6th
1993 EuroHockey Cup Winners Trophy	1st
1994 EuroHockey Cup Winners Cup	7th
1995 EuroHockey Club Challenge I	1st
1998 EuroHockey Club Champions Cup	7th
2004 EuroHockey Cup Winners Trophy	3rd
2006 EuroHockey Club Trophy	4th
2012–13 Euro Hockey League	Round of 16
2016–17 Euro Hockey League	Round of 16
2020 Men's EuroHockey Club Trophy II	Cancelled
2022 EuroHockey Club Challenge I	1st
2022–23 Men's Euro Hockey League	Second round
2024 Men's EuroHockey Club Trophy I	1st

== Women's section ==
Lisnagarvey first formed a women's section in 1903–04. The original women's section was suspended during the First World War but was reformed in 1920. During the 1920s at least two Lisnagarvey women's players – Sylvia Kirkwood and K. Kirkwood – represented Ireland.

Women's Irish Junior Cup

Season	Winners	Score	Runners up
2010–11	Railway Union		Lisnagarvey
2012–13	Pembroke Wanderers II		Lisnagarvey

== Grounds ==
The Lisnagarvey clubhouse at Hillsborough, County Down

Lisnagarvey originally played their home games at two separate pitches in Lisburn – one at Magheralave Road and the other at Antrim Road. Lisnagarvey took over the Magheralave Road pitch from the original Lisburn Hockey Club after it disbanded around 1907–08. They continued to use this pitch until 1933–34. In the early 1950s Lisnagarvey purchased ground in Blaris, near the Lisnagarvey transmitting station. The club members subsequently built their own pitch and pavilion. In the 1980s the club established an artificial pitch complex at a completely new venue nearby. The new home was named New Blaris. In 2002 New Blaris was sold and the club temporarily played its home games at Queen's University. Work on a new home at Comber Road, Hillsborough, County Down was started in 2004. This facility featuring a new clubhouse and two water-based artificial turf pitches was completed in time for the start of the 2005–06 season.

== Notable players ==
=== Men's field hockey internationals ===
In 1908 Fred Hull became the first Lisnagarvey player to play for Ireland. He made his debut as a substitute in a match against Wales.

Ireland

- R. T. S. Bailey
- G. W. Bannister
- Jonathan Bell
- Jack Bowden
- Joseph Bowden
- Michael Bowden
- Daniel Buser
- Coburn Carson
- John Clarke
- E. Coates
- Tim Cockram
- James Corken
- E. Dillon
- Neil Dunlop
- G. A. Gamble
- Neal Glassey
- Paul Gleghorne
- Stanley Green
- Harry Greenfield
- Fred Hull
- Steven Johnson
- Jimmy Kirkwood
- T. Kirkwood
- James Lorimer
- Errol Lutton
- Stephen Martin
- Gregor Guthrie McGregor
- Wally Mercer
- Sean Murray
- Matthew Nelson
- Eric Priestley
- Noel Quinn
- Ray Quinn
- Reg Quinn
- Brian Raphael
- Ian Raphael
- Michael Robson
- Nelson Russell
- Brown Shaw
- Derek Shaw
- Julian Stevenson
- John Sturgeon
- Gerry Thompson
- Alan Tolerton
- Michael Watt
- Peter Wilkin

Great Britain

- Steven Johnson
- Jimmy Kirkwood
- Stephen Martin

=== Ireland men's cricket internationals ===
- Jack Bowden
- Jimmy Kirkwood
- Nelson Russell

=== Women's field hockey internationals ===
Ireland

- K. Kirkwood
- Sylvia Kirkwood

=== Recipients of the Military Cross ===
During the First World War forty-three club members served with the British Armed Forces. Of these four were killed and four were wounded. Four others received the Military Cross.

- E. B. B. Hamilton
- R. P. McGregor
- Hugh Morrow
- Nelson Russell

== Honours ==
=== Men ===
- EuroHockey Club Trophy
  - Winners: 1991: 1
  - Runners Up: 1989: 1
- British Club Championship
  - Winners: 1969–70, 1970–71: 2
- Men's Irish Hockey League
  - Winners: 2011–12, 2015–16, 2018–19, 2021-22: 4
  - Runners Up: 2009–10, 2010–11: 2
- Irish Senior Cup
  - Winners: 1924–25, 1926–27, 1940–41, 1944–45, 1945–46, 1950–51, 1951–52, 1957–58, 1959–60, 1961–62, 1965–66, 1969–70, 1970–71, 1987–88, 1988–89, 1989–90, 1990–91, 1991–92, 1992–93, 1993–94, 1996–97, 2002–03, 2004–05, 2019-20, 2021-22, 2024-25: 26 ^{(Note 1)} ^{(Note 2)}
  - Runners Up: 1942–43, 1948–49, 1958–59, 1977–78, 1980–81, 1995–96, 1999–2000, 2005–06, 2015–16, 2018–19: 10
- Irish Junior Cup
  - Winners: 1954–55, 1955–56, 1957–58, 1958–59, 1959–60, 1961–62, 1962–63, 1966–67, 1969–70, 1971–72, 1972–73, 1973–74, 1976–77, 1986–87, 1989–90, 2002–03, 2010–11: 17
  - Runners Up: 1905–06, 1953–54, 1974–75, 1988–89, 1992–93, 1998–99, 2000–01, 2003–04: 8
- EY Champions Trophy
  - Winners: 2015-16, 2021-22: 2
  - Runners Up: 2019: 1
- Ulster Senior League
  - Winners: 1924–25, 1933–34, 1937–38, 1938–39, 1944–45, 1949–50, 1950–51, 1951–52, 1952–53, 1953–54, 1954–55, 1959–60, 1960–61, 1962–63, 1964–65, 1965–66, 1969–70, 1971–72, 1976–77, 1977–78, 1980–81, 1989–90, 1990–91, 1991–92, 1993–94, 1994–95, 1996–97, 1998–99, 1999–2000, 2000–01, 2001–02, 2010–11: 32
- Kirk Cup
  - Winners: 1922–23, 1923–24, 1924–25, 1933–34, 1938–39, 1941–42, 1942–43, 1944–45, 1945–46, 1947–48, 1952–53, 1953–54, 1955–56, 1960–61, 1961–62, 1963–64, 1970–71, 1972–73, 1973–74, 1977–78, 1979–80, 1981–82, 1989–90, 1994–95, 1995–96, 1996–97, 1997–98, 1998–99, 2000–01, 2001–02, 2011–12, 2022-23, 2023-24: 33 ^{(Note 3)}
  - Runners Up: 1936–37, 1948–49, 1965–66, 1974–75, 1983–84, 1984–85, 1990–91, 1991–92, 1999–2000, 2004–05, 2006–07, 2007–08, 2008–09, 2012–13, 2013–14: 15
- Anderson Cup
  - Winners: 1922–23, 1924–25, 1933–34, 1934–35, 1937–38, 1942–43, 1945–46, 1946–47, 1951–52, 1953–54, 1954–55, 1955–56, 1957–58, 1959–60, 1960–61, 1963–64, 1975–76, 1979–80, 1980–81, 1986–87, 1993–94, 1995–96, 1996–97, 2007–08, 2018–19, 2022-23: 26
  - Runners Up: 1926–27, 1943–44, 1952–53, 1964–65, 1976–77, 1977–78, 2005–06, 2009–10, 2013–14, 2014–15 : 10

Notes

- ^1 In 1940–41 bad weather originally delayed the final and when a date was eventually arranged it was again cancelled following the Belfast Blitz. A number of Lisnagarvey players served as A.R.P.s and were unable to travel to the final. The Irish Hockey Union and Limerick PMYA both agreed the trophy should be shared.
- ^2 In 1961–62 Three Rock Rovers and Lisnagarvey shared the Irish Senior Cup after two replays. First game finished 2–2; Second game finished 1–1.
- ^3 In 1955–56 Lisnagarvey and Parkview shared the Kirk Cup.

=== Women ===
- Irish Junior Cup
  - Runners Up: 2010–11, 2012–13
