= David Craig (field hockey) =

British field hockey player

Sport
- Sport: Field hockey
- Position: Defender
Senior career
Years	Team	Caps	Goals
1978–1986	Southgate	-	-
1987–1989	Wakefield	-	-
1990	Welton	-	-
National team
Years	Team	Caps	Goals
–	England & Great Britain		-
Medal record
Field hockey
Representing Great Britain
Champions Trophy
Bronze medal – third place	1984 Karachi	Team competition

David Craig is a former British hockey international.

== Biography ==
Craig played club hockey for Southgate Hockey Club in the Men's England Hockey League and was a short corner and penalty flick specialist.

In 1984 he won the Dunlop Johnson award having made the most outstanding contribution to the club.

While at Southgate he was selected by England for the 1982 Men's Hockey World Cup in Bombay and was part of the bronze medal winning Great Britain team that competed at the 1984 Men's Hockey Champions Trophy, in Karachi, Pakistan.

After leaving Southgate, he had a spell with Wakefield Hockey Club before joining Welton Hockey Club in 1990.
