= Richard Dodds =

British field hockey player (born 1959)

Personal information
- Born: 23 February 1959 (age 67) York, England
- Height: 181 cm (5 ft 11 in)
- Weight: 72 kg (159 lb)

Sport
- Sport: Field hockey
Senior career
Years	Team	Caps	Goals
1980–1988	Southgate	-	-
National team
Years	Team	Caps	Goals
–	Great Britain	65	-
–	England	79	-
Medal record
Men's field hockey
Representing Great Britain
Olympic Games
Gold medal – first place	1988 Seoul	Team competition
Bronze medal – third place	1984 Los Angeles	Team competition
Champions Trophy
Silver medal – second place	1985 Perth	Team competition
Representing England
World Cup
Silver medal – second place	1986 London	Team competition
European Championship
Silver medal – second place	1987 Moscow	Team

Richard David Allan Dodds OBE (born 23 February 1959) is an English former field hockey player. He was captain of the gold medal-winning Great Britain squad in the 1988 Summer Olympics in Seoul.

== Biography ==
Dodds was born in the English city of York, and was educated at Kingston Grammar School and at St Catharine's College, Cambridge. Dodds captained Cambridge University and represented them against Oxford in the 80th varsity match in 1980.

Dodds played club hockey for Southgate in the Men's England Hockey League. He was selected for the Great Britain team for the 1980 Olympic Games in Moscow, but subsequently did not attend due to the boycott. He did however play at the 1982 Men's Hockey World Cup.

Dodds represented Great Britain and won a bronze medal at the 1984 Summer Olympics in Los Angeles. Dodds was part of the silver medal winning Great Britain team that competed at the 1985 Men's Hockey Champions Trophy in Perth, Australia and also captained the England squad who won silver medal at the 1986 Men's Hockey World Cup before the Olympic gold in 1988.

At international retirement he had earned 79 caps for England and 65 caps for Great Britain. In 1989, he was awarded the OBE for services to hockey. He has played veterans hockey with Reading alongside other former Olympians Don Williams, Rob Thompson, and John Shaw.

He currently works as a consultant orthopaedic surgeon at the Royal Berkshire Hospital in Reading, England.
