= Poznańska =

Poznańska is a surname. Notable people with the surname include:

- Sophia Poznańska (1906-1942), Polish-Jewish resistance worker
- Alicja Poznańska (1930-1990, married name Alice Parizeau), Polish-Canadian writer
- Hanna Poznańska, (1918-2011, married name Hanna Segal), British psychoanalyst

== See also ==
- Prowincja Poznańska or Province of Posen, province of Prussia from 1848 to 1919
- AZS Politechnika Poznanska, field hockey team
