= Jon Peckett =

British field hockey player

Personal information
- Born: 5 July 1981 (age 45) Stamford, Lincolnshire, England

Sport
- Sport: Field hockey
Senior career
| Years | Team | Caps | Goals |
| 2002–2004 | Southgate | - | - |
| 2004—2007 | Surbiton | - | - |
National team
| Years | Team | Caps | Goals |
| – | GB & England | 58 | - |
Medal record
Men's field hockey
Representing England
European Championship
| Bronze medal – third place | 2003 Barcelona | Team |

Jon Andrew David Peckett (born 5 July 1981) is a British former field hockey player who played for GB and England.

== Biography ==
Peckett was born in Stamford, Lincolnshire, England, and educated at Stamford School. He played club hockey for Southgate in the Men's England Hockey League and was captain of the England Under-21 squad.

While at Southgate he represented England at the 2002 Commonwealth Games in Manchester, where he helped England to a fifth place finish.

Peckett signed for Surbiton from Southgate for the 2004/05 season but required a knee operation which resulted in a six month break. He returned from injury for the England training squad in South Africa.

By the time he had retired from international hockey he had won 58 international caps. In September 2007 he took the position of head of hockey and PE teacher at Stamford Endowed Schools, where he spent seven years before becoming head of hockey at The Perse School in Cambridge from 2014 to 2020.

In 2021, after a year in China, he took the role of youth head coach at Cambridge City Hockey Club and returned to the Perse School.
