= 1974 EuroHockey Club Champions Cup =

Tournament details
- Host country: Netherlands
- City: Utrecht
- Dates: 31 May – 3 June
- Teams: 12 (from 11 associations)
- Venue: SV Kampong

Final positions
- Champions: (West Germany) SC 1880 Frankfurt (1st title)
- Runner-up: (Netherlands) Kampong
- Third place: (West Germany) Rot-Weiss Köln

The 1974 EuroHockey Club Champions Cup, taking place in Utrecht, was the inaugural official edition of Europe's premier field hockey club competition. The group stage format was preserved. It was won by SC 1880 Frankfurt, which had already won the last three unofficial editions.

== Preliminary round ==
=== Pool A ===
Pos	Team	Pld	W	D	L	GF	GA	GD	Pts	Qualification
1	(West Germany) SC 1880 Frankfurt	2	2	0	0	5	0	+5	4	Semi-finals
2	(Poland) Warta Poznań	2	1	0	1	3	3	0	2	
3	(England) Hounslow	2	0	0	2	2	7	−5	0	

31 May 1974
15:00

SC 1880 Frankfurt (West Germany)	1–0	(Poland) Warta Poznań

1 June 1974
10:30

SC Frankfurt 1880 (West Germany)	4–0	(England) Hounslow

1 June 1974
15:45

Warta Poznań (Poland)	3–2	(England) Hounslow

=== Pool B ===
Pos	Team	Pld	W	D	L	GF	GA	GD	Pts	Qualification
1	(Netherlands) Kampong (H)	2	2	0	0	12	0	+12	4	Semi-finals
2	(France) FC Lyon	2	1	0	1	4	8	−4	2	
3	(Ireland) Pembroke Wanderers	2	0	0	2	2	10	−8	0	

(H) Hosts

31 May 1974
16:45

Kampong (Netherlands)	6–0	(France) FC Lyon

1 June 1974
12:00

Kampong (Netherlands)	6–0	(Ireland) Pembroke Wanderers

1 June 1974
17:15

FC Lyon (France)	4–2	(Ireland) Pembroke Wanderers

=== Pool C ===
Pos	Team	Pld	W	D	L	GF	GA	GD	Pts	Qualification
1	(West Germany) Rot-Weiss Köln	2	2	0	0	6	2	+4	4	Semi-finals
2	(Spain) Club Egara	2	1	0	1	5	2	+3	2	
3	(Denmark) København	2	0	0	2	1	8	−7	0	

31 May 1974
16:45

København (Denmark)	1–4	(West Germany) Rot-Weiss Köln

1 June 1974
12:00

København (Denmark)	0–4	(Spain) Club Egara

1 June 1974
17:15

Rot-Weiss Köln (West Germany)	2–1	(Spain) Club Egara

=== Pool D ===
Pos	Team	Pld	W	D	L	GF	GA	GD	Pts	Qualification
1	(Belgium) Léopold	2	1	1	0	6	1	+5	3	Semi-finals
2	(Italy) Levante	2	1	1	0	4	1	+3	3	
3	(Switzerland) Rotweiss Wettingen	2	0	0	2	0	8	−8	0	

31 May 1974
15:00

Levante (Italy)	3–0	(Switzerland) Rotweiss Wettingen

1 June 1974
10:30

Levante (Italy)	1–1	(Belgium) Léopold

1 June 1974
15:45

Rotweiss Wettingen (Switzerland)	0–5	(Belgium) Léopold

== Ninth to twelfth place classification ==
=== Bracket ===
Semi-finals
2 June
(Ireland) Pembroke Wanderers	1
(Switzerland) Rotweiss Wettingen	2
2 June
(England) Hounslow	3
(Denmark) København	2

Ninth place
3 June
(Switzerland) Rotweiss Wettingen	0
(England) Hounslow	3
11th place
3 June
(Ireland) Pembroke Wanderers	3
(Denmark) København	0

== Fifth to eighth place classification ==
=== Bracket ===
Semi-finals
2 June
(Poland) Warta Poznań	1
(Spain) Club Egara	2
2 June
(France) FC Lyon	3
(Italy) Levante	1

Fifth place
3 June
(Spain) Club Egara	5
(France) FC Lyon	1
Seventh place
3 June
(Poland) Warta Poznań	5
(Italy) Levante	2

== First to fourth place classification ==
=== Bracket ===
Semi-finals
2 June
(Netherlands) Kampong (a.e.t.)	4
(Belgium) Léopold	2
2 June
(West Germany) SC 1880 Frankfurt	2
(West Germany) Rot-Weiss Köln	1

Final
3 June
(Netherlands) Kampong	0
(West Germany) SC 1880 Frankfurt	1
Third place
3 June
(Belgium) Léopold	1
(West Germany) Rot-Weiss Köln (a.e.t.)	2

== Final standings ==
1. (West Germany) SC 1880 Frankfurt
2. (Netherlands) Kampong
3. (West Germany) Rot-Weiss Köln
4. (Belgium) Léopold
5. (Spain) Club Egara
6. (France) FC Lyon
7. (Poland) Warta Poznań
8. (Italy) Levante
9. (England) Hounslow
10. (Switzerland) Rotweiss Wettingen
11. (Ireland) Pembroke Wanderers
12. (Denmark) København

== See also ==
- 1974 Men's EuroHockey Nations Championship
