= Jackie McWilliams =

Great Britain and Ireland women's hockey player

Personal information
- Full name: Jackie Amanda McWilliams
- Born: 18 February 1964 (age 62) Ballymoney, County Antrim; Northern Ireland
- Height: 160 cm (5 ft 3 in)
- Weight: 65 kg (143 lb)

Sport
- Sport: Field hockey
- Position: Defender
Senior career
Years	Team	Caps	Goals
1978–199x	Randalstown	-	-
198x–19xx	→ Ulster	-	-
19xx–201x	Ballymena	-	-
National team
Years	Team	Caps	Goals
198x–199x	Ireland	64	-
198x–199x	Great Britain	34	-
Medal record
Representing Great Britain
Olympic Games
Bronze medal – third place	1992 Barcelona	Team

Jackie Amanda McWilliams (born 18 February 1964), also known as Jackie Burns, is a former women's field hockey player from Northern Ireland who represented both Ireland and Great Britain at international level. She represented Great Britain at the 1992 Summer Olympics, winning the bronze medal.

== Domestic teams ==
McWilliams played club level field hockey for Randalstown and Ballymena. She was still playing for Ballymena in 2011 when in her late forties. McWilliams also represented Ulster at interprovincial level.

== International ==
=== Ireland ===
McWilliams made 64 senior appearances for Ireland.

=== Great Britain ===
McWilliams made 34 senior appearances Great Britain. She represented Great Britain at the 1992 Summer Olympics, winning the bronze medal.

== Later years ==
McWilliams worked as a schoolteacher at Ballymena Primary School. She also helped coach both the Ulster women's field hockey team and Ballymena Academy. Two of McWilliams' nephews are senior men's field hockey internationals. Her sister, Anne, is the mother of Paul and Mark Gleghorne. Paul has played for Ireland while his brother, Mark has played for Ireland, England and Great Britain.
