= David Tomlinson (disambiguation) =

David Tomlinson (1917–2000) was an English film actor and comedian.

David or Dave Tomlinson may also refer to:

- David Tomlinson (Canadian actor) (born 1992), Canadian actor
- David Tomlinson (field hockey), British field hockey player
- Dave Tomlinson (born 1969), ice hockey player
- Dave Tomlinson (Canadian football) (1926–2005), Canadian football player
- Dave Formula (born 1946), stage name of English musician David Tomlinson
