= Margaret Gleghorne =

Great Britain and Ireland women's hockey player

Personal information
- Full name: Margaret Gleghorne
- Born: c. 1956 County Antrim; Northern Ireland

Sport
- Sport: Field hockey
- Position: Forward
Youth career
- Years: Team
- 1967–1974: Ballymena Academy
- 1970–1974: → Ulster Schools
Senior career
| Years | Team | Caps | Goals |
| 197x–199x | Pegasus | - | - |
| 1970–19xx | → Ulster | - | - |
National team
| Years | Team | Caps | Goals |
| 1972–1987 | Ireland | ? | - |
| 1979–198x | Great Britain | ? | - |

Margaret Gleghorne, also known as Maggie Gleghorne, is a former women's field hockey player from Northern Ireland who represented both Ireland and Great Britain at international level.

== Domestic teams ==
=== Ballymena Academy ===
Between 1967 and 1974 Gleghorne attended Ballymena Academy. In 1972–73 she was a member of the academy team that were joint winners of the Ulster Senior Schoolgirls' Cup. In 1972 Gleghorne was still a schoolgirl at Ballymena Academy when she made her senior debut for Ireland aged sixteen.

=== Pegasus ===
Gleghorne played club level field hockey for Pegasus.

=== Ulster ===
Gleghorne represented Ulster at interprovincial level, both as a schoolgirl and as a senior player. By the time she left school in 1974, she had played for the Ulster schoolgirls team for five years in succession. By the age of fifteen, she had made seven senior interprovincial appearances, the first one gained against Leinster in 1970.

== International ==
=== Ireland ===
In 1972 Gleghorne made her senior debut for Ireland against Scotland. At the time she was still a sixteen year old schoolgirl at Ballymena Academy. In 1972–73 she scored the winning goal for Ireland against England at Wembley in front of a crowd of 60,000. In 1977 she was a member of the Ireland team that won the Triple Crown. She captained Ireland when they won the 1983 Intercontinental Cup in Kuala Lumpur. Her Ireland teammates from this era included Mary Geaney. She also represented Ireland at the 1984 Women's EuroHockey Nations Championship and the 1986 Women's Hockey World Cup. In 2010 she was inducted into the Irish Hockey Association Hall of Fame. She retired from the Ireland squad in 1986–87.

=== Great Britain ===
Gleghorne also represented Great Britain. She was first called up for the Great Britain squad in 1979–80 in preparation for the 1980 Summer Olympics. In 1984 while playing for Great Britain, she was named the team's Player of the Year.

| Tournaments | Place | Team |
|---|---|---|
| 1983 Intercontinental Cup | 1st | Ireland |
| 1984 Women's EuroHockey Nations Championship | 5th | Ireland |
| 1986 Women's Hockey World Cup | 12th | Ireland |

== Family ==
Two of Gleghorne's nephews are senior men's field hockey internationals. Her brother, Andy, is the father of Paul and Mark Gleghorne. Paul has played for Ireland while his brother, Mark has played for Ireland, England and Great Britain.

== Honours ==
Ireland

- Intercontinental Cup
  - Winners: 1983
- Triple Crown
  - Winners: 1977

Ballymena Academy

- Ulster Senior Schoolgirls' Cup
  - Winners: 1972–73
