= 2007 Men's EuroHockey Club Champions Cup =

Field hockey club competition

Tournament details
- Host country: Netherlands
- City: Bloemendaal
- Dates: 25–28 May
- Teams: 8 (from 8 associations)
- Venue: HC Bloemendaal

Final positions
- Champions: (Germany) Crefelder HTC (1st title)
- Runner-up: (Spain) Atlètic Terrassa
- Third place: (Netherlands) Bloemendaal

Tournament statistics
- Matches played: 16
- Goals scored: 89 (5.56 per match)

The 2007 Men's EuroHockey Club Champions Cup was the 34th and last edition of the Men's EuroHockey Club Champions Cup, Europe's premier club field hockey tournament organized by the European Hockey Federation. It was hosted by HC Bloemendaal in Bloemendaal, Netherlands from 25 to 28 May 2007. From the next season the EuroHockey Club Champions Cup was replaced by the Men's Euro Hockey League.

Crefelder HTC won their first title by defeating Atlètic Terrassa 1–0. The hosts Bloemendaal won the bronze medal by defeating Reading 6–2.

== Preliminary round ==
=== Pool A ===
Pos	Team	Pld	W	D	L	GF	GA	GD	Pts	Qualification
1	(Germany) Crefelder HTC	3	2	1	0	9	4	+5	7	Final
2	(England) Reading	3	1	1	1	6	7	−1	4	Third place match
3	(Scotland) Kelburne	3	1	0	2	8	6	+2	3	
4	(Poland) Pocztowiec Poznań	3	1	0	2	9	15	−6	3	

Source: Global Sports Archive

25 May 2007
10:00

Crefelder HTC (Germany)	2–1	(Scotland) Kelburne

25 May 2007
12:00

Pocztowiec Poznań (Poland)	5–3	(England) Reading

26 May 2007
10:00

Pocztowiec Poznań (Poland)	2–6	(Scotland) Kelburne

26 May 2007
12:00

Crefelder HTC (Germany)	1–1	(England) Reading

27 May 2007
10:00

Crefelder HTC (Germany)	6–2	(Poland) Pocztowiec Poznań

27 May 2007
12:00

Reading (England)	2–1	(Scotland) Kelburne

=== Pool B ===
Pos	Team	Pld	W	D	L	GF	GA	GD	Pts	Qualification
1	(Spain) Atlètic Terrassa	3	3	0	0	14	6	+8	9	Final
2	(Netherlands) Bloemendaal (H)	3	2	0	1	12	3	+9	6	Third place match
3	(Belgium) Waterloo Ducks	3	1	0	2	7	5	+2	3	
4	(France) Saint Germain	3	0	0	3	2	21	−19	0	

Source: Global Sports Archive
(H) Hosts

25 May 2007
14:00

Atlètic Terrassa (Spain)	7–2	(France) Saint Germain

25 May 2007
16:00

Bloemendaal (Netherlands)	1–0	(Belgium) Waterloo Ducks

26 May 2007
14:00

Atlètic Terrassa (Spain)	4–2	(Belgium) Waterloo Ducks

26 May 2007
16:00

Bloemendaal (Netherlands)	9–0	(France) Saint Germain

27 May 2007
14:00

Waterloo Ducks (Belgium)	5–0	(France) Saint Germain

27 May 2007
16:00

Atlètic Terrassa (Spain)	3–2	(Netherlands) Bloemendaal

== Classification round ==
=== Fifth and seventh place ===
28 May 2007
08:00

Waterloo Ducks (Belgium)	7–2	(Poland) Pocztowiec Poznań

28 May 2007
10:15

Kelburne (Scotland)	2–2 (a.e.t.)	(France) Saint Germain
Penalties
	4–5

=== Third and fourth place ===
28 May 2007
12:30

Reading (England)	2–6	(Netherlands) Bloemendaal

=== Final ===
28 May 2007
15:00

Crefelder HTC (Germany)	1–0	(Spain) Atlètic Terrassa

== Final standings ==
Pos	Team
1st place, gold medalist(s)	(Germany) Crefelder HTC
2nd place, silver medalist(s)	(Spain) Atlètic Terrassa
3rd place, bronze medalist(s)	(Netherlands) Bloemendaal (H)
4	(England) Reading
5	(Belgium) Waterloo Ducks
5	(France) Saint Germain
7	(Scotland) Kelburne
7	(Poland) Pocztowiec Poznań

Source: EHF
(H) Host

== See also ==
- 2007 Men's EuroHockey Nations Championship
