= 1969 EuroHockey Club Champions Cup =

The 1969 EuroHockey Club Champions Cup was the first unofficial edition of Europe's premier field hockey club competition. It took place in Brussels as a group stage won by CD Terrassa.

== Standings ==
1. (Spain) Club Egara
2. (Italy) MDA Roma
3. (Netherlands) SV Kampong
4. (Belgium) Royal Leopold Club
5. (Poland) Warta Poznań
6. (France) FC Lyon
7. (Czechoslovakia) Slavia Prague
8. (France) Lille Métropole HC

== See also ==
- European Hockey Federation
