= 1971 EuroHockey Club Champions Cup =

European sports championship

The 1971 EuroHockey Club Champions Cup was the third unofficial edition of Europe's premier field hockey competition. It took place in Rome as a group stage, which was won by SC 1880 Frankfurt's hockey team. It was the first of five titles in a row.

== Standings ==
1. (West Germany) SC 1880 Frankfurt
2. (Italy) MDA Roma
3. (Spain) Club Egara (defending champion)
4. (Spain) Barcelona
5. (Belgium) Royal Leopold Club
6. (France) Lyon
7. (Netherlands) Tilburg MHC
8. (Ireland) Lisnagarvey
9. (Switzerland) Rot-Weiss Wettingen
10. (Hungary) Kil. Sörgyár
11. (Czechoslovakia) Bohemians Prague
12. (Poland) Warta Poznań
