= David Tomlinson (field hockey) =

British hockey player (born 1936)

Personal information
- Born: Hitchin, England Q3. 1936

Sport
- Sport: Field hockey
- Position: Full-back
Senior career
Years	Team	Caps	Goals
1957–1960	Cambridge University	-	-
1959–1960	Knebworth	-	-
1960–1967	Southgate	-	-
National team
Years	Team	Caps	Goals
–	Great Britain		-
–	England		-

David F. Tomlinson (born Q3.1936) was a field hockey player who was selected for Great Britain at the 1960 Summer Olympics.

== Biography ==
Tomlinson was educated at Alleyn's School and Trinity College, Cambridge. While at the University of Cambridge he earned his blue and played for the team known as Cambridge University Wanderers.

Tomlinson was subsequently named in the Olympic traialist list in May 1960 before making the final Olympic squad, although he did not earn any minutes during the competition.

After the Olympics Tomlinson played club hockey for Southgate Hockey Club and for Hertfordshire and Cambridgeshire at county level.

He retired from hockey in 1969.
