= 1973 EuroHockey Club Champions Cup =

The 1973 EuroHockey Club Champions Cup was the fifth and last unofficial edition of Europe's premier field hockey club competition. It took place in Frankfurt as a group stage, which was won once again by SC 1880 Frankfurt.

== Standings ==
1. (West Germany) SC 1880 Frankfurt
2. (Netherlands) SV Kampong
3. (West Germany) Rot-Weiss Köln
4. (Belgium) Royal Léopold Club
5. (Spain) Club Egara
6. (Poland) Warta Poznań
7. (France) Lyon
8. (Czechoslovakia) Slavia Prague
9. (England) Hounslow HC
10. (Switzerland) Rot-Weiss Wettingen
11. (Italy) HC Vigevano
12. (Finland) Huovit Helsinki
