= Robert Clift =

British field hockey player (born 1962)

Personal information
- Born: 1 August 1962 (age 64) Newport, Wales
- Height: 182 cm (6 ft 0 in)
- Weight: 77 kg (170 lb)

Sport
- Sport: Field hockey
- Position: inside left
Senior career
| Years | Team | Caps | Goals |
| 1982–1984 | Nottingham | - | - |
| 1984–1987 | Hounslow | - | - |
| 1987–1988 | Southgate | - | - |
| 1988–1992 | East Grinstead | - | - |
National team
| Years | Team | Caps | Goals |
| – | Great Britain | | - |
| – | England | | - |
Medal record
Men's field hockey
Representing Great Britain
Olympic Games
| Gold medal – first place | 1988 Seoul | Team competition |
Champions Trophy
| Bronze medal – third place | 1984 Karachi | Team competition |
| Silver medal – second place | 1985 Perth | Team competition |
Representing England
World Cup
| Silver medal – second place | 1986 London | Team competition |
European Championship
| Silver medal – second place | 1987 Moscow | Team |

Robert John Clift (born 1 August 1962) is a British former field hockey player. He was a member of the Great Britain squad in the 1988 Summer Olympics in Seoul where they won a gold medal.

== Biography ==
Clift was born in Newport, Wales, and was educated at Bablake School and the University of Nottingham.

His preferred position was inside left and in November 1982 he received his first England call up while studying at Nottingham and playing for Nottingham Hockey Club.

Clift signed for Hounslow Hockey Club for the start of the 1984/85 season. While there he was part of the bronze medal-winning Great Britain team that competed at the 1984 Men's Hockey Champions Trophy, in Karachi, Pakistan and the silver medal-winning team the following year in Perth, Australia. He also won silver with the England squad at the 1986 Men's Hockey World Cup in October.

Clift moved to Southgate Hockey Club for the 1987/88 season and while at Southgate represented Great Britain at the 1988 Olympic Games in Seoul and winning a gold medal with the team.

After the Olympics he joined East Grinstead and represented England at the 1990 Men's Hockey World Cup and captained the Great Britain team at the 1992 Olympic Games in Barcelona.

After the Olympics, Clift joined Tunbridge Wells Hockey Club as their coach.
