= Soma Singh =

British field hockey player

Personal information
- Born: 26 July 1965 (age 61) Sangathpur, Punjab, India
- Height: 183 cm (6 ft 0 in)
- Weight: 82 kg (181 lb)

Sport
- Sport: Field hockey
- Position: centre half/sweeper
Senior career
Years	Team	Caps	Goals
1989–1999	Southgate	-	-
National team
Years	Team	Caps	Goals
1985–1997	England	65	-
1990–1996	Great Britain	66	-
Medal record
Men's field hockey
Representing England
European Championship
Bronze medal – third place	1995 Dublin	Team

Soma Singh (born 26 July 1965) is an Indian born British former international field hockey player, who captained and played 189 times for England and GB and represented Great Britain at the 1996 Summer Olympics in Atlanta.

== Biography ==
Singh was born in India but emigrated to the United Kingdom aged one. He was educated at Highfields School in Coventry and in 1982 was representing the England U19 team.

He played club hockey for Southgate Hockey Club in the Men's England Hockey League having previously played for Khalsa. He made his England debut on 29 November 1989 and his Great Britain debut on 2 September 1990. While at Southgate he played in the 1990 Men's Hockey World Cup and 1994 Men's Hockey World Cup and went to the 1996 Olympic Games in Atlanta.

Singh is currently the Director of Hockey at Lord Wandsworth College and head coach at Alton Hockey Club and Old Georgians Hockey Club.

In June 2012 Soma Singh was awarded England Hockey's Club Coach of the Season after leading Richmond men's 1st XI into the Men's England Hockey League Conference East, the team's third consecutive promotion.
