= 1972 EuroHockey Club Champions Cup =

The 1972 EuroHockey Club Champions Cup was the fourth unofficial edition of Europe's premier field hockey club competition. It took place in Frankfurt, where it was won by host and defending champions SC 1880 Frankfurt.

== Standings ==
1. (West Germany) SC 1880 Frankfurt
2. (Netherlands) Eindhovense MHC
3. (West Germany) Rüsselsheimer RK
4. (Czechoslovakia) Slavia Prague
5. (Spain) CD Terrassa
6. (Belgium) Royal Léopold Club
7. (Switzerland) Rot-Weiss Wettingen
8. (Italy) MDA Roma
9. (France) Lyon
10. (Ireland) Lisnagarvey HC
11. (Scotland) Harris Academy FP HC
12. (Denmark) København
