= Jack Bowden =

Irish cricketer and field hockey player (1916–1988)

Cricket information
- Batting: Right-handed
- Bowling: Leg-break

International information
- National side: Ireland

Career statistics
Competition	First-class
Matches	6
Runs scored	52
Batting average	5.77
100s/50s	0/0
Top score	34
Balls bowled	1,006
Wickets	19
Bowling average	19.42
5 wickets in innings	2
10 wickets in match	0
Best bowling	6/23
Catches/stumpings	6/–
- Source: CricketArchive, 6 December 2022

John Bowden (17 October 1916 – 22 December 1988) was an Irish cricketer and field hockey player. He was born and died in County Antrim.

== Cricket ==
A right-handed batsman and leg-break bowler, he made his debut for Ireland in July 1946 against Scotland. He went on to play for Ireland on 18 occasions, the last coming against Sussex in August 1956. Six of these matches had first-class status.

== Field hockey ==
Bowden played for Lisnagarvey Hockey Club and played for the Ireland national field hockey team on nineteen occasions.
