= Great Britain men's national field hockey team results =

Team GB Hockey Team

The Great Britain men's national field hockey team represents the United Kingdom in Olympic field hockey tournaments. The team won gold at the 1920 Summer Olympics in Antwerp and the 1988 Summer Olympics in Seoul. The team won the 2017 Sultan Azlan Shah Cup.

These are the results from 2017 to 2020:

== Fixtures & Results ==
=== 2020 Fixtures & Results ===
==== 2020-21 Men's FIH Pro League ====
1 February 2020 Match 1	Australia	4–4 (3–1 p)	Great Britain	Australia
		Report

2 February 2020 Match 2	Australia	5–1	Great Britain	Australia
		Report

8 February 2020 Match 3	New Zealand	1–1 (3–1 p)	Great Britain	New Zealand
		Report

9 February 2020 Match 4	New Zealand	0–3	Great Britain	New Zealand
		Report

27 October 2020 Match 5	Netherlands	1–0	Great Britain	Amstelveen, Netherlands
		Report

29 October 2020 Match 6	Netherlands	3–1	Great Britain	Amstelveen, Netherlands
		Report

31 October 2020 Match 7	Belgium	3–2	Great Britain	Brussels, Belgium
		Report

1 November 2020 Match 8	Belgium	2–1	Great Britain	Brussels, Belgium
		Report

=== 2019 Fixtures & Results ===
==== 2019 Men's FIH Pro League ====
25 January 2019 Match 1	Spain	5–6	Great Britain	Valencia, Spain
		Report

8 February 2019 Match 2	New Zealand	2–6	Great Britain	Christchurch, New Zealand
		Report

16 February 2019 Match 3	Australia	2–0	Great Britain	Perth, Australia
		Report

6 April 2019 Match 4	Argentina	1–5	Great Britain	Rosario, Argentina
		Report

28 April 2019 Match 5	Germany	0–1	Great Britain	Mönchengladbach, Germany
		Report

4 May 2019 Match 6	Great Britain	1–1 (2–3 p)	Spain	London, England
		Report

18 May 2019 Match 7	Great Britain	2–3	Argentina	London, England
		Report

19 May 2019 Match 8	Great Britain	0–4	Belgium	London, England
		Report

30 May 2019 Match 9	Belgium	4–2	Great Britain	Antwerp, Belgium
		Report

2 Jun 2019 Match 10	Netherlands	1–3	Great Britain	Amsterdam, Netherlands
		Report

6 Jun 2019 Match 11	Great Britain	3–4	Germany	London, England
		Report

9 Jun 2019 Match 12	Great Britain	2–2 (4–3 p)	Australia	London, England
		Report

14 Jun 2019 Match 13	Great Britain	2–2 (4–5 p)	Netherlands	London, England
		Report

23 Jun 2019 Match 14	Great Britain	2–0	New Zealand	Twickenham, England
		Report

28 Jun 2019 Semi-Final 1	Australia	6–1	Great Britain	Amsterdam, Netherlands
		Report

30 Jun 2019 3RD/4TH PLACE	Netherlands	5–3	Great Britain	Amsterdam, Netherlands
		Report

==== Test Matches ====
10 Oct 2019	Spain	0–1	Great Britain	Valencia, Spain
		Report

11 Oct 2019	Spain	4–1	Great Britain	Valencia, Spain
		Report

==== FIH Olympic Qualifiers ====
2 Nov 2019	Great Britain	4–1	Malaysia	London, England
		Report

3 Nov 2019	Great Britain	5–2	Malaysia	London, England
		Report

=== 2018 Fixtures & Results ===
==== Test Matches ====
14 June 2018 Match 1	Belgium	1–1	Great Britain	Beerschot HC, Belgium
		Report

16 June 2018 Match 2	Belgium	3–2	Great Britain	Beerschot HC, Belgium
		Report

20 June 2018 Match 3	Germany	1–1	Great Britain	Cologne, Germany
		Report

22 June 2018 Match 4	Germany	5–5	Great Britain	Cologne, Germany
		Report

2 October 2018	Great Britain	2–3	Belgium	London, England
		Report

3 October 2018 Anniversary Match	Great Britain	2–1	Belgium	London, England
		Report

=== Sultan Azlan Shah Cup ===
29 April 2017 Pool Match	Great Britain	2–2	India	Malaysia
		Report

30 April 2017 Pool Match	Japan	3–5	Great Britain	Malaysia
		Report

2 May 2017 Pool Match	Malaysia	0–1	Great Britain	Malaysia
		Report

3 May 2017 Pool Match	Great Britain	1–2	Australia	Malaysia
		Report

5 May 2017 Pool Match	Great Britain	3–2	New Zealand	Malaysia
		Report

6 May 2017 FINAL	Australia	3–4	Great Britain	Malaysia
		Report

==== Test Matches ====
13 November 2017 Friendly	Germany	5–3	Great Britain	Mannheim, Germany

14 November 2017 Friendly	Germany	3–3	Great Britain	Mannheim, Germany

16 November 2017 Friendly	Germany	2–5	Great Britain	Mannheim, Germany

== See also ==
- Great Britain men's national field hockey team
- Great Britain women's national field hockey team
- England men's national hockey team
- Ireland men's national field hockey team
- Scotland men's national field hockey team
- Wales men's national field hockey team
