= Warta Poznań (field hockey) =

- Full name: Warta Poznań (field hockey)
- League: Ekstraklasa
- Founded: 26 July 1923

Personnel
- Coach: Hieronim Stawujak; Mateusz Grochal; Michał Wachowiak
- Website: kswarta.pl/hokej_na_trawie
Home	Away	Third

Warta Poznań is a Polish field hockey club, a section of the wider multi-sports club, from Poznań. It is historically one of the most successful clubs in the country.

== History ==
The field hockey section was established as a section of the club on July 26, 1923, and was founded by some of the former players of the disintegrating "Argon" Middle School Club. Already in the year of its establishment, the section played several games, and in 1924 the Warta team played in Sopot with the local Zoppoter Tennis Club and in Gdańsk with the Danziger Hockey Club, losing and drawing. In 1925, Warta played two matches in Warsaw with Warszawskie Towarzystwo Łyżwiarskie (Warsaw Skating Society), recording 6-0 and 11-2 victories. It is difficult to say what happened back then, but in 1926, work in the section ceases activity, and in 1927, the management decided to dissolve it.

In Poznań at the time there were excellent conditions for practicing this discipline, which resulted in the establishment of the Polish Field Hockey Association in 1926.

In 1929, on the initiative of E. Poszwa and L. Kędzis, the field hockey section was reactivated, but it is one of the winter sports divisions. On January 1, 1930, the section is seriously strengthened thanks to the merger with the Poznań Skating Club (it had the oldest field hockey section in Poznań). In the same year, Warta wins the award of the Municipal Committee for Physical Education and Military Training, defeating the then Polish champion - Lechia Poznań and the vice-champion - Czarni Poznań.

In 2015 the club was surprisingly relegated from the top division.

== Honours ==
- Polish Championship
  - Gold medal (12 times): 1963, 1965, 1967, 1968, 1969, 1970, 1971, 1972, 1973, 1975, 1976, 1980
  - Silver medal (10 times): 1938, 1957, 1961, 1962, 1964, 1966, 1974, 1977, 1978, 1981
  - Bronze medal (8 times): 1952, 1953, 1952, 1956, 1958, 1982, 2011, 2019
- Polish Indoor Championship
  - Gold medal (9 times): 1964, 1969, 1970, 1971, 1973, 1975, 1976, 1979, 1982
  - Silver medal (3 times): 1974, 1977, 1978
  - Bronze medal (5 times): 1962, 1963, 1965, 1968, 1985
