= Southgate Hockey Club =

English field hockey team

Coordinates: 51°39′23″N 0°08′20″W

- Full name: Southgate Hockey Club
- League: Men's England Hockey League; Women's England Hockey League
- Founded: 1886; 139 years ago
- Home ground: Southgate Hockey Centre

Southgate Hockey Club is a field hockey club based at Southgate Hockey Centre in Trent Park, near Oakwood in London.

The men's 1st XI play in the Men's England Hockey League. The club has 9 men's sides, 5 ladies' sides and a large junior section. The men's team have been champions of England on four occasions (1976–77, 1977–78, 1987–88, 1988–89).

== History ==
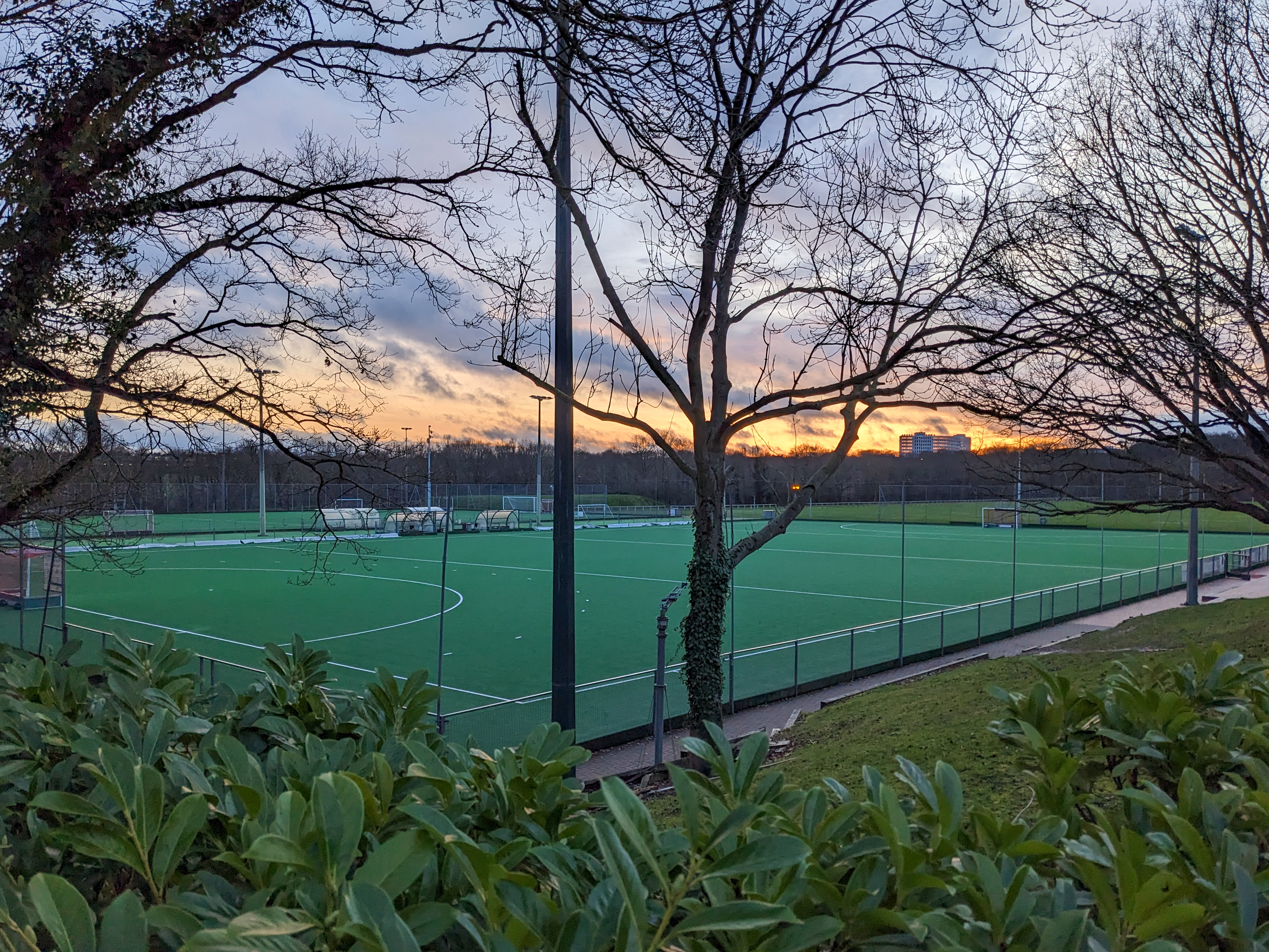
The hockey centre in 2023

The club was formed in 1886. Matches were initially played in Broomfield Park, Palmers Green; in 1890 the club relocated to the Walker Ground on Waterfall Road. In order to meet the challenge created by the introduction of artificial grass pitches, the club began hiring pitches away from the Walker Ground from around 1985. After a search for a new location, the club relocated to Southgate Hockey Centre during the 1997/98 season.

For most of its history the club has provided many players for the national side and, prior to the formation of organised leagues in 1968, featuring prominently in the unofficial leagues published in the press.

The club won the Hockey Association Cup in 1975, 1980, 1982, 1985, 1986, 1987 and 1988. The club won the inaugural National League in the season 1988/89, bringing the total of national titles to eight.

The club won the European Club Championship in 1976, 1977 and 1978, and won bronze in 1975 and 1983. In 1999, the club won the English indoor hockey title.

== Teams ==
=== Men's First Team Squad 2025–26 season ===
- 2. Matthew Thomas
- 3. Alex Newitt
- 5. Robert Gill
- 7. James Hickson
- 8. Daniel West
- 10. John Sterlini (captain)
- 11. Ryan Gray
- 13. Joe Hillyer
- 14. Max Hendry
- 16. Richard Swan
- 17. Simon Walker
- 18. Nathanael Farrant
- 21. Rajan Shukla
- 22. James Clifton
- 23. Charles Hamilton
- 24. Barney Bithell
- 25. Erdal Demir (goalkeeper)
- 27. Xavier Guy
- 28. Robert Shearer
- 35. Matthew Thomas

== Honours ==
- EuroHockey Club Champions Cup
  - Winners: 1976, 1977, 1978: 3
- National League
  - Winners: 1976–77, 1977–78, 1987–88, 1988–89: 4
- National Cup
  - 1973–74, 1974–75, 1981–82, 1984–85, 1985–86, 1986–87, 1987–88: 7

== Notable players ==
=== Men's internationals ===
Extended content

Player	Events	Notes/Ref
(England) David Aldridge	WC (1973, 1975)	
(England) Steve Batchelor	Oly (1984, 1988), WC (1986, 1990)	
(England) Roly Brookeman	WC (1978, 1982), CT (1978, 1980, 1981)	
(England) John Cadman	England debut 1960	
(England) Will Calnan	Oly (2024)	
(Wales) Robert Cattrall	Oly (1984), CT (1978)	
(England) Darren Cheesman	CT (2012)	
(England) Robert Clift	Oly (1988)	
(England) Bernie Cotton	Oly (1972), WC (1973, 1975, 1978), CT (1978, 1980)	
(England) David Craig	WC (1982), CT (1984)	
(England) Mike Crowe	WC (1973)	
(England) Derek Day	Oly (1952)	
(England) Richard Dodds	Oly (1984, 1988), WC (1982, 1986)	
(Scotland) Ali Douglas	EC (2023, 2025)	
(Scotland) Calum Douglas	EC (2025)	
(England) James Duthie	Oly (1984), WC (1982), CT (1978,80,81,84,85,86,88)	
(England) Tony Ekins	Oly (1968, 1972), WC (1978)	
(Wales) / (South Africa) Richard Gay	CG (2014)	
(England) Kim Jones	Oly (1960)	
(England) Sean Kerly	Oly (1984, 1988), WC (1986, 1990)	
(Wales) James Kyriakides	CG (2018)	
(England) Alistair McGinn	WC (1978)	
(England) Ian McGinn	WC (1973, 1975, 1978)	
(England) James Neale	WC (1973, 1975)	
(England) John W. Neill	1956–1958	
(England) David Owen	CT (1978, 1980)	
(England) Jon Peckett	CG (2002)	
(England) John Shaw	Oly (1992, 1996), WC (1986, 1994)	
(England) Soma Singh	Oly (1996), WC (1990, 1994)	
(England) David Tomlinson	1960–1967	
(England) Bill Waugh	Oly (2000), CG (1998), WC (1998)	
(England) David Westcott	Oly (1984), WC (1982)	
(Wales) Andy Western	EC (1987)	
(England) David Whitaker	WC (1975, 1978)	
(England) Duncan Woods	CG (1998, 2002), WC (1998)	

Source: Key

- Oly = Olympic Games
- CG = Commonwealth Games
- WC = World Cup
- CT = Champions Trophy
- EC = European Championships
