= John Shaw (field hockey) =

British field hockey player (born 1962)

Personal information
- Born: 24 April 1962 (age 64) Taiping, Perak, Malaysia
- Height: 183 cm (6 ft 0 in)
- Weight: 70 kg (154 lb)

Sport
- Sport: Field hockey
Senior career
Years	Team	Caps	Goals
1984–1997	Southgate	-	-
National team
Years	Team	Caps	Goals
–	England & Great Britain		-
Medal record
Men's field hockey
Representing Great Britain
Champions Trophy
Bronze medal – third place	1984 Karachi	Team
Representing England
World Cup
Silver medal – second place	1986 London	Team
European Championship
Silver medal – second place	1987 Moscow	Team
Bronze medal – third place	1995 Dublin	Team

John David Shaw (born 24 April 1962) is former field hockey player who competed at the 1992 Summer Olympics and the 1996 Summer Olympics.

== Biography ==
Shaw was born in Taiping, Perak, Malaysia. He played club hockey for Southgate Hockey Club in the Men's England Hockey League.

Shaw was part of the bronze medal winning Great Britain team that competed at the 1984 Men's Hockey Champions Trophy, in Karachi, Pakistan and won a silver medal with England at the 1986 Men's Hockey World Cup.

At the 1992 Olympic Games in Barcelona, he represented Great Britain in the hockey tournament.

After participating in the 1994 Men's Hockey World Cup, where he acted as vice-captain, he represented Great Britain at the 1996 Olympic Games in Atlanta.

After he retired from playing he coached the Slough women's team. He later worked as a hockey coach at Surbiton High School, and coached at Old Cranleighans Hockey Club. He has previously worked as a coach for Southgate Hockey Club Men's 1st XI and for Oxford University Hockey Club.
