= Antrim Hockey Club =

Northern Irish hockey club

- Founded: 1894
- Colors: Blue and white
- Home ground: Antrim Forum, Lough Road, Antrim, County Antrim, Northern Ireland

Personnel
- Coach: Jonathan McMeekin
- Chairman: Dean Kane

Affiliation
- Conference: Ulster Branch of the IHA
- Website: antrimhockey.hitssports

Antrim Hockey Club is a hockey club based at Antrim Forum The club was founded in 1894 and was one of the founding members of the Ulster Hockey Union. Antrim Hockey Club's first eleven play in the Senior League of the Ulster Senior League.

== Grounds ==
After World War II, the playing pitches were located in the Castle Grounds, Antrim.

In 1970, another pitch was acquired at the Lough Neagh shore on ground owned by the then club president. Also in 1973 a new gravel pitch became available when the Antrim Forum opened.

In 1972, the club agreed an alliance with Antrim Rugby Football Club. An old stable in the Castle Grounds was converted into a clubhouse and premises developed at Allen Park. Changing accommodation with three hockey pitches, two grass and one gravel, along with three rugby pitches were constructed and first used in 1979. The Ireland-v-Scotland international was played on the grass pitch in 1980. The building of a clubhouse was completed in 1985.

In 1991, Antrim Borough Council constructed a new sand-filled artificial turf pitch at Antrim Forum. The club annual general meeting in June of that year decided that all five of the club teams would play as much as possible on the new pitch. Later at a special meeting in April 1995 the majority of those present decided to terminate the relationship with the Rugby Club. Since then, meetings and after-match socialising now take place at Muckamore Cricket Club.

== Early successes ==
Antrim was a major force in the early years of the Ulster Hockey Union. The Ulster Senior League and Kirk Cup were both regularly won by Antrim. The club was one of the original members and the first-ever winners of the Ulster Senior League.

== All-Ireland competitions ==
Antrim have never won the Irish Senior Cup. They lost their first final to Limerick PYMA by 2 goals to 1 on 31 March 1928. Despite a protest against one of the umpires the result stood. In 1954, the first team lost another Irish Senior Cup Final to YMCA.

The second team has fared better in the Irish Junior Cup. Its first final in 1899–1900 resulted in a 2–1 defeat by Corinthians II. The other three final appearances, however, resulted in victories. The Cup was won twice in successive years: in 1947 beating Roscrea, from County Tipperary by two goals to one; and in 1948 beating Pembroke Wanderers II by three goals to two. The last Irish Junior Cup success came in 1976 when Limerick PYMA were beaten by two goals to one.

== Domestic record after World War II ==
The first team won the Anderson Cup four times in six years, between 1947 and 1952.

The last major successes for the first team came in the Kirk Cup in 1965–66 and in 1971–72 season when the Cup was shared with Instonians after two replays. The Cup, which had been on display in Hall's Hotel in Antrim, survived a terrorist bomb which exploded outside, severely damaging the building.

The first team survived three relegation play-offs, against Bangor in the 1963–64 season, Queen's University in the 1982–83 season and Cliftonville in the 1984–85 season.

In the 1985–86 season the first team headed the League until well into the New Year before finally finishing third, behind Belfast YMCA and Banbridge. The Anderson Cup final was lost 1–0, in extra time, to Banbridge. This would prove to be Antrim's last successful season in Section 1 of the Ulster Senior League. A road-traffic accident on 27 September 1986 caused the deaths of three first-team players. The loss of these players contributed to the relegation of the first XI at the end of the 1987–88 season.

Antrim has finished near the top of Senior League Section 2 (renamed as Section 1 when Section 1 was renamed as the Premier League in 2001) in every season since, falling short of regaining their long held Senior 1 status.

In 2011–12, the first team gained promotion to the Premier League, having completed a double of winning both the Senior 1 title and the Linden cup.

== Honours ==
- Ulster Senior League
  - 1897–98, 1900–01, 1902–03, 1904–05, 1907–08, 1920–21, 1926–27, 1927–28, 1929–30.
- Ulster Senior 1 League
  - 2011–12
- Kirk Cup (6 wins and 1 share)
  - 1898–99, 1900–01, 1904–05, 1906–07, 1927–28, 1965–66.
  - (Shared) 1971–72.
- Anderson Cup
  - 1921–22, 1925–26, 1928–29, 1938–39, 1947–48, 1948–49, 1950–51, 1952–53 (incomplete)
- Irish Junior Cup (3 wins)
  - 1946–47, 1947–48, 1975–76.

== International players ==
Seven Antrim playing members have represented Ireland at Full International level.

- Armatage Moore – Capped for the first time in 1899. 3 Caps in total.
- Thomas McElderry – Capped once in 1900.
- Samuel Rea – Capped once in 1902.
- John Entwhistle – Capped once in 1904.
- Francis Robinson – Capped twice whilst a member of Antrim.
- George Clarke – Capped three times.
- Alvin Carson – Antrim's most capped player with 90 appearances in goal, with his initial Cap in 1970. Alvin also gained recognition on 10 occasions with the Great Britain hockey team. After retiring as a player, Alvin became an FIH International Umpire. He died 25 February 2005, aged 59.

== Administrators ==
Seven Antrim members have served as Ulster Branch President.

- George Hurst in 1900 – the second ever President of the Ulster Branch.
- William Heney from 1911 to 1920
- Robert H Coulter in 1924. He was also Irish Hockey Union President in 1934–35, the only Antrim man ever to hold that position.
- Nathaniel M. Clarke in 1938
- Bob Fawcett in 1973
- Francis Baird in 1980
- George Houston in 1993

Outside holding Offices, the most notable other contribution by an Antrim club member was when John Kirk, J.P. presented the Ulster Hockey Union with the Ulster Challenge Cup. The Cup became known as the Kirk Cup.
