= AZS Politechnika Pocztowiec Poznań =

Coordinates: 52°23′51″N 16°56′0″E

AZS Politechnika Pocztowiec Poznań is a field hockey team based in Poznań, Poland. The club was founded in 1932. At first their name was Pocztowiec Poznań but in 2012 they merged with the omnisport club of the Poznań University of Technology.
