= Men's EuroHockey Club Champions Cup =

EuroHockey Club Champions Cup
- Sport: Field hockey
- Founded: 1969
- First season: 1969 (unofficial); 1974 (official)
- Folded: 2007
- Replaced by: Euro Hockey League
- Confederation: EHF (Europe)
- Last champion: (Germany) Crefelder HTC (1st title) (2007)
- Most titles: (Germany) Uhlenhorst Mülheim (9 titles)

The EuroHockey Club Champions Cup is a defunct men's field hockey competition for clubs in Europe. It was first played for in 1974. It was replaced by the Euro Hockey League in 2007. Unofficial tournaments were played in 1969 and then in 1970, in 1971, in 1972 and in 1973).

== Summaries ==
=== Unofficial results ===
Year	Host	Final			Third place match			Number of teams
Year	Host	Winner	Score	Runner-up	Third place	Score	Fourth place	Number of teams
1969; Details	Brussels, Belgium	(Spain); Club Egara	1–0	(Italy); MDA Roma	(Netherlands); Kampong		(Belgium); Léopold	8
1970; Details	Terrassa, Spain	(Spain); Club Egara	2–0	(Netherlands); Laren	(Belgium); Léopold		(West Germany); SC 1880 Frankfurt	9
1971; Details	Rome, Italy	(West Germany); SC 1880 Frankfurt	0–0 (a.e.t.) (1–0 p.s.)	(Italy); MDA Roma	(Spain); Club Egara		(Spain); Real Club de Polo	12
1972; Details	Frankfurt, West Germany	(West Germany); SC 1880 Frankfurt	5–1	(Netherlands); HTCC	(West Germany); Rüsselsheimer RK		(Czechoslovakia); Slavia Prague	12
1973; Details	Frankfurt, West Germany	(West Germany); SC 1880 Frankfurt	2–1	(Netherlands); Kampong	(West Germany); Rot-Weiss Köln		(Belgium); Léopold	12

=== Official results ===
Year	Host	Final			Third place match			Number of teams
Year	Host	Winner	Score	Runner-up	Third place	Score	Fourth place	Number of teams
1974; Details	Utrecht, Netherlands	(West Germany); SC 1880 Frankfurt	1–0	(Netherlands); Kampong	(West Germany); Rot-Weiss Köln	2–1 (a.e.t.)	(Belgium); Léopold	12
1975; Details	Frankfurt, West Germany	(West Germany); SC 1880 Frankfurt	1–0	(Belgium); Léopold	(England); Southgate	1–0	(Netherlands); Kampong	12
1976; Details	Amsterdam, Netherlands	(England); Southgate	3–2	(Belgium); Uccle	(West Germany); Rüsselsheimer RK	4–2	(Czechoslovakia); Slavia Prague	12
1977; Details	London, England	(England); Southgate	4–1	(Belgium); Uccle	(Spain); CD Terrassa	3–2	(West Germany); Schwarz-Weiß Köln	12
1978; Details	Barcelona, Spain	(England); Southgate	5–2	(West Germany); Rüsselsheimer RK	(Netherlands); Klein Zwitserland	5–2 after extra time	(Spain); Real Club de Polo	12
1979; Details	The Hague, Netherlands	(Netherlands); Klein Zwitserland	2–1	(Spain); Real Club de Polo	(West Germany); Rüsselsheimer RK	5–1	(Scotland); Edinburgh	12
1980; Details	Barcelona, Spain	(England); Slough	1–0	(Netherlands); Klein Zwitserland	(Spain); Real Club de Polo	1–0	(West Germany); Frankenthal	12
1981; Details	Brussels, Belgium	(Netherlands); Klein Zwitserland	4–0	(Soviet Union); SKA Sverdlovsk	(Spain); Real Club de Polo	5–2	(England); Slough	8
1982; Details	Versailles, France	(Soviet Union); Dynamo Alma-Ata	4–3	(Netherlands); Klein Zwitserland	(Spain); Real Club de Polo	3–1	(England); Slough	8
1983; Details	The Hague, Netherlands	(Soviet Union); Dynamo Alma-Ata	4–2	(Netherlands); Klein Zwitserland	(England); Southgate	3–1	(Spain); Real Club de Polo	8
1984; Details	Terrassa, Spain	(West Germany); Frankenthal	3–2	(Belgium); Uccle	(Spain); Atlètic Terrassa	4–3	(Netherlands); Klein Zwitserland	8
1985; Details	Frankenthal, West Germany	(Spain); Atlètic Terrassa	3–0	(Netherlands); Klein Zwitserland	(Soviet Union); Dynamo Alma-Ata	9–4	(West Germany); Frankenthal	8
1986; Details	Utrecht, Netherlands	(Netherlands); Kampong	2–1	(West Germany); Uhlenhorst Mülheim	(Spain); Atlètic Terrassa	3–1	(Soviet Union); Dynamo Alma-Ata	8
1987; Details	Terrassa, Spain	(Netherlands); Bloemendaal	2–2 (a.e.t.) (4–1 p.s.)	(Spain); Atlètic Terrassa	(West Germany); Uhlenhorst Mülheim	3–3 (a.e.t.) (4–1 p.s.)	(Netherlands); Kampong	8
1988; Details	Bloemendaal, Netherlands	(West Germany); Uhlenhorst Mülheim	3–3; 4–3 penalty strokes	(Netherlands); Bloemendaal	(Spain); Atlètic Terrasa	4–1	(Soviet Union); Dynamo Alma-Ata	8
1989; Details	Mülheim, West Germany	(West Germany); Uhlenhorst Mülheim	2–0	(Spain); Atlètic Terrassa	(Netherlands); Bloemendaal	3–0	(England); Southgate	8
1990; Details	Frankfurt, West Germany	(West Germany); Uhlenhorst Mülheim	2–0	(Spain); Atlètic Terrassa	(Netherlands); Bloemendaal	4–2	(West Germany); SC 1880 Frankfurt	8
1991; Details	Wassenaar, Netherlands	(Germany); Uhlenhorst Mülheim	4–2	(Spain); Atlètic Terrassa	(Netherlands); HGC	7–1	(England); Hounslow	8
1992; Details	Amsterdam, Netherlands	(Germany); Uhlenhorst Mülheim	7–2	(Spain); Atlètic Terrassa	(Netherlands); Bloemendaal	2–1	Racing Club de France	8
1993; Details	Brussels, Belgium	(Germany); Uhlenhorst Mülheim	1–0	(Spain); Club Egara	(Belgium); Royal Léopold	0–0; 4–3 penalty strokes	Racing Club de France	8
1994; Details	Bloemendaal, Netherlands	(Germany); Uhlenhorst Mülheim	2–0	(Netherlands); Bloemendaal	(Germany); Dürkheim	2–1	(England); Hounslow	8
1995; Details	Mülheim, Germany	(Germany); Uhlenhorst Mülheim	1–0	(Netherlands); Amsterdam	(Spain); Atlètic Terrassa	4–1	(Italy); Cernusco	8
1996; Details	Mülheim, Germany	(Germany); Uhlenhorst Mülheim	3–0	(Netherlands); Amsterdam	(Spain); Atlètic Terrassa	3–1	(Poland); Grunwald Poznań	8
1997; Details	Amsterdam, Netherlands	(Netherlands); HGC	4–3	(Germany); Harvestehuder THC	(Spain); Club Egara	6–1	(Belarus); Minsk	8
1998	Terrassa, Spain	(Spain); Atlètic Terrassa	2–1	(Netherlands); Amsterdam	(Germany); Uhlenhorst Mülheim	4–0	(France); Lille	
1999	Terrassa, Spain	(Netherlands); Den Bosch	2–1	(Spain); Club Egara	(Germany); Harvestehuder THC	7–2	(Poland); Grunwald Poznań	
2000	Cannock, England	(Germany); Club an der Alster	1–1; 5–3 penalty strokes	(Netherlands); Bloemendaal	(Spain); Club Egara	3–0	(England); Cannock	
2001	Bloemendaal, Netherlands	(Netherlands); Bloemendaal	3–1	(Germany); Harvestehuder THC	(Spain); Club Egara	6–0	(England); Cannock	
2002	Brasschaat, Belgium	(Germany); Club an der Alster	2–2; 5–2 penalty strokes	(Netherlands); Den Bosch	(Spain); Club Egara	3–2	(England); Surbiton	
2003	Brussels, Belgium	(England); Reading	1–1; 4–2 penalty strokes	(Spain); Real Club de Polo	(Netherlands); Bloemendaal	5–2	(Poland); Grunwald Poznań	
2004	Barcelona, Spain	(Spain); Real Club de Polo	1–0	(Germany); Club an der Alster	(Netherlands); Amsterdam	1–1; 4–3 penalty strokes	(England); Reading	
2005	Amsterdam, Netherlands	(Netherlands); Amsterdam	1–0	(England); Reading	(Spain); Atlètic Terrassa	6–2	(Germany); Club an der Alster	
2006	Cannock, England	(Germany); Stuttgarter Kickers	3–1	(Spain); Atlètic Terrassa	(Netherlands); Oranje Zwart	5–2	(Poland); Pocztowiec Poznań	8
2007; Details	Bloemendaal, Netherlands	(Germany); Crefelder HTC	1–0	(Spain); Atlètic Terrassa	(Netherlands); Bloemendaal	6–2	(England); Reading	8

== Records and statistics ==
=== Performance by club ===
==== Official results ====
Rank	Club	Gold	Silver	Bronze	Total
1	(Germany) Uhlenhorst Mülheim	9	1	2	12
2	(England) Southgate	3	0	2	5
3	(Spain) Atlètic Terrassa	2	7	6	15
4	(Netherlands) Klein Zwitserland	2	4	1	7
5	(Netherlands) Bloemendaal	2	3	5	10
6	(Germany) Club an der Alster	2	1	0	3
7	(Soviet Union) Dynamo Alma-Ata	2	0	1	3
8	(Germany) 1880 Frankfurt	2	0	0	2
9	(Netherlands) Amsterdam	1	3	1	5
10	(Spain) Real Club de Polo	1	2	3	6
11	(Netherlands) Den Bosch	1	1	0	2
11	(Netherlands) Kampong	1	1	0	2
11	(England) Reading	1	1	0	2
14	(Netherlands) HGC	1	0	1	2
15	(Germany) Crefelder HTC	1	0	0	1
15	(Germany) Frankenthal	1	0	0	1
15	(England) Slough	1	0	0	1
15	(Germany) Stuttgarter Kickers	1	0	0	1
19	(Belgium) Uccle	0	3	0	3
20	(Spain) Club Egara	0	2	4	6
21	(Germany) Harvestehuder THC	0	2	1	3
22	(Germany) Rüsselsheimer RK	0	1	2	3
23	(Belgium) Léopold	0	1	1	2
24	(Soviet Union) SKA Sverdlovsk	0	1	0	1
25	(Spain) CD Terrassa	0	0	1	1
25	(Germany) Dürkheimer HC	0	0	1	1
25	(Netherlands) Oranje Zwart	0	0	1	1
25	(Germany) Rot-Weiss Köln	0	0	1	1
Totals (28 entries)		34	34	34	102

==== Unofficial results ====
Rank	Club	Gold	Silver	Bronze	Total
1	(West Germany) SC 1880 Frankfurt	3	0	0	3
2	(Spain) Club Egara	2	0	1	3
3	(Italy) MDA Roma	0	2	0	2
4	(Netherlands) Kampong	0	1	1	2
5	(Netherlands) HTCC	0	1	0	1
5	(Netherlands) Laren	0	1	0	1
7	(Belgium) Léopold	0	0	1	1
7	(West Germany) Rot-Weiss Köln	0	0	1	1
7	(West Germany) Rüsselsheimer RK	0	0	1	1
Totals (9 entries)		5	5	5	15

==== Total medal table ====
Rank	Club	Gold	Silver	Bronze	Total
1	(Germany) Uhlenhorst Mülheim	9	1	2	12
2	(Germany) SC 1880 Frankfurt	5	0	0	5
3	(England) Southgate	3	0	2	5
4	(Spain) Atlètic Terrassa	2	7	6	15
5	(Netherlands) Klein Zwitserland	2	4	1	7
6	(Netherlands) Bloemendaal	2	3	5	10
7	(Spain) Club Egara	2	2	5	9
8	(Germany) Club an der Alster	2	1	0	3
9	(Soviet Union) Dynamo Alma-Ata	2	0	1	3
10	(Netherlands) Amsterdam	1	3	1	5
11	(Spain) Real Club de Polo	1	2	3	6
12	(Netherlands) Kampong	1	2	1	4
13	(Netherlands) Den Bosch	1	1	0	2
13	(England) Reading	1	1	0	2
15	(Netherlands) HGC	1	0	1	2
16	(Germany) Crefelder HTC	1	0	0	1
16	(Germany) Frankenthal	1	0	0	1
16	(England) Slough	1	0	0	1
16	(Germany) Stuttgarter Kickers	1	0	0	1
20	(Belgium) Uccle	0	3	0	3
21	(Germany) Harvestehuder THC	0	2	1	3
22	(Italy) MDA Roma	0	2	0	2
23	(Germany) Rüsselsheimer RK	0	1	3	4
24	(Belgium) Léopold	0	1	2	3
25	(Netherlands) HTCC	0	1	0	1
25	(Netherlands) Laren	0	1	0	1
25	(Soviet Union) SKA Sverdlovsk	0	1	0	1
28	(Germany) Rot-Weiss Köln	0	0	2	2
29	(Spain) CD Terrassa	0	0	1	1
29	(Germany) Dürkheimer HC	0	0	1	1
29	(Netherlands) Oranje Zwart	0	0	1	1
Totals (31 entries)		39	39	39	117

=== Performances by nation ===
==== Official results ====
Rank	Nation	Gold	Silver	Bronze	Total
1	Germany (GER) (Note: Includes results from West German clubs between 1974 and 1990)	16	5	7	28
2	Netherlands (NED)	8	12	9	29
3	England (ENG)	5	1	2	8
4	Spain (ESP)	3	11	14	28
5	Soviet Union (URS)	2	1	1	4
6	Belgium (BEL)	0	4	1	5
Totals (6 entries)		34	34	34	102

==== Unofficial results ====
Rank	Nation	Gold	Silver	Bronze	Total
1	West Germany (FRG)	3	0	2	5
2	Spain (ESP)	2	0	1	3
3	Netherlands (NED)	0	3	1	4
4	Italy (ITA)	0	2	0	2
5	Belgium (BEL)	0	0	1	1
Totals (5 entries)		5	5	5	15

==== Total medal table ====
Rank	Nation	Gold	Silver	Bronze	Total
1	Germany (GER) (Note: Includes results from West German clubs between 1969 and 1990)	19	5	9	33
2	Netherlands (NED)	8	15	10	33
3	Spain (ESP)	5	11	15	31
4	England (ENG)	5	1	2	8
5	Soviet Union (URS)	2	1	1	4
6	Belgium (BEL)	0	4	2	6
7	Italy (ITA)	0	2	0	2
Totals (7 entries)		39	39	39	117

== See also ==
- Women's EuroHockey Club Champions Cup
- Men's Euro Hockey League
- Men's EuroHockey Indoor Club Cup
