= 1976 EuroHockey Club Champions Cup =

The 1976 EuroHockey Club Champions Cup, taking place in Amsterdam, was the third edition of Europe's premier field hockey club competition. It was won by Southgate Hockey Club from London - the first of three titles in a row.

== Standings ==
1. (England) Southgate HC
2. (Belgium) Uccle Sport
3. (West Germany) Rüsslesheimer RK
4. (Czechoslovakia) Slavia Prague
5. (Spain) CD Terrassa
6. (Netherlands) Amsterdamsche HBC
7. (West Germany) SC 1880 Frankfurt (defending champions)
8. (Scotland) Inverleith HC
9. (France) Lyon
10. (Italy) HC Benevenuta
11. (Poland) Warta Poznań
12. (Wales) Cardiff HC
