= 1977 EuroHockey Club Champions Cup =

The 1977 EuroHockey Club Champions Cup, taking place in London, was the fourth edition of Europe's premier field hockey club competition. It was won by hosts and defending champions Southgate Hockey Club from London.

== Standings ==
1. (England) Southgate HC
2. (Belgium) Uccle Sport
3. (Spain) CD Terrassa
4. (West Germany) Schwarz-Weiss Cologne
5. (Netherlands) SV Kampong
6. (England) Nottingham HC
7. (Czechoslovakia) Slavia Prague
8. (Poland) Warta Poznań
9. (France) Lyon
10. (Socialist Federal Republic of Yugoslavia) HK Suboticanka
11. (Soviet Union) Dynamo Almaty
12. (Scotland) Edinburgh HC

== See also ==
- European Hockey Federation
