= 1978 EuroHockey Club Champions Cup =

The 1978 EuroHockey Club Champions Cup, taking place in Barcelona, was the fifth edition of Europe's premier field hockey club competition. It was won once again by Southgate Hockey Club from London - the last of their three titles to date.

== Standings ==
1. (England) Southgate HC
2. (West Germany) Rüsselsheimer RK
3. (Spain) Real Club de Polo, Barcelona
4. (Netherlands) HC Klein Zwitserland
5. (England) Slough HC
6. (Belgium) Uccle Sport
7. (Czechoslovakia) Slavia Prague
8. (Switzerland) Rot-Weiss Wettingen
9. (Scotland) Edinburgh HC
10. (Socialist Federal Republic of Yugoslavia) HK Jedinstvo
11. (Wales) Swansea Bay HC
12. (Soviet Union) Dynamo Almaty
