= Great Britain men's national field hockey team =

Men's national field hockey team representing the UK

Great Britain
- Association: Great Britain Hockey
- Confederation: EHF (Europe)
- Head Coach: Zak Jones
- Manager: Paul Gannon
- Captain: David Ames
Home	Away

Olympic Games
- Appearances: 19 (first in 1920)
- Best result: (gold) 1st (1920, 1988)
Medal record
Event	1st	2nd	3rd
Olympic Games	2	1	2
Champions Trophy	0	1	2
Pro League	0	1	1
Total	2	3	5
Olympic Games
Gold medal – first place	1920 Antwerp	Team
Gold medal – first place	1988 Seoul	Team
Silver medal – second place	1948 London	Team
Bronze medal – third place	1952 Helsinki	Team
Bronze medal – third place	1984 Los Angeles	Team
Champions Trophy
Silver medal – second place	1985 Perth	
Bronze medal – third place	1978 Lahore	
Bronze medal – third place	1984 Karachi	

The Great Britain men's national field hockey team participates in international field hockey tournaments such as the Summer Olympics and the FIH Pro League. The team won gold at the 1920 Summer Olympics in Antwerp and the 1988 Summer Olympics in Seoul. The team won the 2017 Sultan Azlan Shah Cup.

In most other competitions, including the Hockey World Cup, the Commonwealth Games and some editions of the Hockey Champions Trophy, the four home nations compete in their own right: England, Ireland (includes both the Republic and Northern Ireland), Scotland and Wales.

The team was established in 1920 as Great Britain and Ireland, before the independence of most of Ireland as the Irish Free State. They only played one tournament under that name: the 1920 Summer Olympics in Antwerp, Belgium, when they won the gold medal. Before 1920 there was only one field hockey tournament at the Olympics, in 1908, when England won the gold, Ireland the silver, and Scotland and Wales the bronze medals.

== Honours ==
=== Summer Olympics ===
- 1908 – (gold) (silver) (bronze) (bronze)
- 1920 – (gold)
- 1948 – (silver)
- 1952 – (bronze)
- 1956 – 4th place
- 1960 – 4th place
- 1964 – 9th place
- 1968 – 12th place
- 1972 – 6th place
- 1984 – (bronze)
- 1988 – (gold)
- 1992 – 6th place
- 1996 – 7th place
- 2000 – 6th place
- 2004 – 9th place
- 2008 – 5th place
- 2012 – 4th place
- 2016 – 9th place
- 2020 – 5th place
- 2024 – 7th place

=== FIH Pro League ===
- 2019 – 4th place
- 2020–21 – 6th place
- 2022–23 – (silver)
- 2023–24 – (bronze)

=== Champions Trophy ===
- 1978 – (bronze)
- 1980 – 7th place
- 1984 – (bronze)
- 1985 – (silver)
- 1986 – 4th place
- 1987 – 4th place
- 1988 – 6th place
- 1989 – 5th place
- 1990 – 6th place
- 1991 – 5th place
- 1992 – 5th place
- 1994 – 6th place
- 2000 – 6th place
- 2007 – 6th place
- 2011 – 6th place
- 2016 – 4th place

=== Hockey World League ===
- 2014–15 – 6th place

=== Sultan Azlan Shah Cup ===
- 2011 – (bronze)
- 2012 – (bronze)
- 2017 – (gold)

== Players ==
=== Current squad ===
Great Britain Hockey and the British Olympic Association have confirmed the 16 players (+3 reserves) selected to represent Team GB in the 2024 Summer Olympics, in Paris, France.

Caps and goals (for both England and Great Britain) updated as of 12 June 2024, after Great Britain v Australia.

No.	Pos.	Player	Date of birth (age)	Caps	Goals	Club
20	GK	(England) Ollie Payne	6 April 1999 (age 27)	34	0	(The Football Association) Holcombe
2	DF	(England) Nick Park	7 April 1999 (age 27)	15	0	(The Football Association) Surbiton
3	DF	(England) Jack Waller	28 January 1997 (age 29)	69	2	(The Football Association) Wimbledon
5	DF	(Northern Ireland) David Ames (Captain)	25 June 1989 (age 37)	74	2	(Royal Dutch Football Association) Oranje-Rood
14	DF	(England) James Albery	1 October 1995 (age 31)	29	0	(The Football Association) Old Georgians
27	DF	(England) Liam Sanford	14 March 1996 (age 30)	48	1	(The Football Association) Old Georgians
30	DF	(England) Conor Williamson	19 January 2004 (age 22)	7	0	(The Football Association) Surbiton
38	DF	(Wales) Gareth Furlong	10 May 1992 (age 34)	7	4	(The Football Association) Surbiton
6	MF	(Wales) Jacob Draper	24 July 1998 (age 28)	53	1	(The Football Association) Hampstead & Westminster
7	MF	(England) Zach Wallace	29 September 1999 (age 27)	66	13	(Royal Dutch Football Association) HC Bloemendaal
15	MF	(England) Phil Roper	24 January 1992 (age 34)	94	45	(The Football Association) Holcombe
19	MF	(England) David Goodfield	15 June 1993 (age 33)	30	7	(The Football Association) Surbiton
28	MF	(Scotland) Lee Morton	23 May 1995 (age 31)	34	3	(The Football Association) Old Georgians
8	FW	(Wales) Rupert Shipperley	21 November 1992 (age 33)	44	9	(The Football Association) Hampstead & Westminster
13	FW	(England) Sam Ward	24 December 1990 (age 35)	108	80	(The Football Association) Old Georgians
31	FW	(England) Will Calnan	17 April 1996 (age 30)	50	8	(The Football Association) Hampstead & Westminster
16	GK	(England) James Mazarelo ^{TRAVELLING RESERVE}	4 February 2001 (age 25)	21	0	(The Football Association) Surbiton
29	MF	(England) Tom Sorsby ^{ACCREDITED RESERVE}	28 October 1996 (age 30)	61	1	(The Football Association) Surbiton
33	MF	(England) Tim Nurse ^{ACCREDITED RESERVE}	4 May 1999 (age 27)	21	2	(The Football Association) Surbiton

== Coaches ==
Extended content

Coach	Term	Major competitions
Stanley Hoare	1956	1956 Olympics
Geoffrey Cutter	1968	1968 Olympics
Bill Vans Agnew	1972	1972 Olympics
Dave Vinson	?	
Roger Self	1980–1983	
David Whitaker	1984-1988	1984 Olympics / 1988 Olympics
Dennis Hay	1991	
Norman Hughes	1992–1992	1992 Olympics
David Whitaker	1992	
Jon Copp	1996	1996 Olympics
Barry Dancer	1999–2000	2000 Olympics
Mike Hamilton	?–2003	
Jason Lee	2003–2012	2004, 2008 and 2012 Olympics
Bobby Crutchley	2013–2018	2016 Olympics
Danny Kerry	2018–2022	2020 Olympics
Paul Revington	2022–2024	2024 Olympics
Zak Jones	2024–present	

== Fixtures and results ==
Extended content

=== 2020-21 Fixtures and results ===
==== 2020-21 Men's FIH Pro League ====
1 February 2020 Match 1	Australia	4–4 (3–1 p)	Great Britain	Australia
		Report

2 February 2020 Match 2	Australia	5–1	Great Britain	Australia
		Report

8 February 2020 Match 3	New Zealand	1–1 (3–1 p)	Great Britain	New Zealand
		Report

9 February 2020 Match 4	New Zealand	0–3	Great Britain	New Zealand
		Report

27 October 2020 Match 5	Netherlands	1–0	Great Britain	Amstelveen, Netherlands
		Report

29 October 2020 Match 6	Netherlands	3–1	Great Britain	Amstelveen, Netherlands
		Report

31 October 2020 Match 7	Belgium	3–2	Great Britain	Brussels, Belgium
		Report

1 November 2020 Match 8	Belgium	2–1	Great Britain	Brussels, Belgium
		Report

12 May 2021 Match 9	Great Britain	5–3	Germany	London, England
		Report

13 May 2021 Match 10	Great Britain	3–1	Germany	London, England
		Report

22 May 2021 Match 11	Great Britain	2–2 (1–3 p)	Spain	London, England
		Report

23 May 2021 Match 12	Great Britain	2–0	Spain	London, England
		Report

==== 2020 Summer Olympics ====
24 July 2021 Group B	Great Britain	3–1	South Africa	Tokyo, Japan
		Report

26 July 2021 Group B	Great Britain	3–1	Canada	Tokyo, Japan
		Report

27 July 2021 Group B	Germany	5–1	Great Britain	Tokyo, Japan
		Report

29 July 2021 Group B	Netherlands	2–2	Great Britain	Tokyo, Japan
		Report

30 July 2021 Group B	Belgium	2–2	Great Britain	Tokyo, Japan
		Report

1 August 2021 Quarter-finals	India	3–1	Great Britain	Tokyo, Japan
		Report

== See also ==
- Great Britain women's national field hockey team
- England men's national hockey team
- Ireland men's national field hockey team
- Scotland men's national field hockey team
- Wales men's national field hockey team
- Great Britain men's national field hockey team Fixtures & Results 2017-2020
