= Three Rock Rovers Hockey Club =

Field hockey club in South Dublin (county), Ireland

Three Rock Rovers
- Union: Hockey Ireland
- Full name: Three Rock Rovers Hockey Club
- Founded: 1893
- Ground: Grange Road; Rathfarnham; South Dublin; Ireland
- Website: threerockrovershc.com
- League: Men's Irish Hockey League

Three Rock Rovers Hockey Club is a field hockey club based in Rathfarnham, Ireland. The club was founded in 1893. It was originally based in Foxrock and was named after Three Rock Mountain. The club's senior men's team plays in the Men's Irish Hockey League and the Men's Irish Senior Cup. The reserve team play in the Men's Irish Junior Cup. Three Rock Rovers have also represented Ireland in European competitions, including the Euro Hockey League. Three Rock Rovers also enters various men's and women's teams in junior, senior and veterans leagues and cup competitions affiliated to the Leinster Hockey Association.

== History ==
Three Rock Rovers were founded in 1893 by a group of former Dublin University Hockey Club players. Together with Dublin University and Monkstown, Three Rock Rovers were among the pioneering field hockey clubs in Ireland. In 2008–09 Three Rock Rovers were founder members of the Men's Irish Hockey League.

=== EY Champions Trophy ===
Year	Winners	Score	Runners up
2017	Three Rock Rovers	2–1	Monkstown
2018	Three Rock Rovers	2–1	Glenanne
2019	Three Rock Rovers	2–0	Lisnagarvey

=== Irish Senior Cup ===
Season	Winners	Score	Runners up
1897–98	Three Rock Rovers	4–0	Dublin University
1908	Three Rock Rovers	6–0	North Down
1912	Queen's University	4–2	Three Rock Rovers
1939	Three Rock Rovers	1–0	Limerick PYMA
1953	Three Rock Rovers	3–1	Lansdowne
1959	Three Rock Rovers	1–0	Lisnagarvey
1960	Lisnagarvey	4–3	Three Rock Rovers
1962	Three Rock Rovers	0–0 (Note: Trophy shared after two replays. First game finished 2–2; Second game finished 1–1.)	Lisnagarvey
1963	Three Rock Rovers	1–0	Lansdowne
1964	Three Rock Rovers	3–1	Cork Church of Ireland
1974	Three Rock Rovers	2–1	Cork Church of Ireland
1977	Belfast YMCA	1–0	Three Rock Rovers
1986	Banbridge	4–3	Three Rock Rovers
1998	Instonians	3–2	Three Rock Rovers
1999	Cork Church of Ireland	4–3	Three Rock Rovers
2014	Three Rock Rovers	2–2 (Note: After extra time. Three Rock Rovers won on penalties.)	Pembroke Wanderers
2018	Three Rock Rovers	5–2	Pembroke Wanderers
2019	Three Rock Rovers	1–0	Lisnagarvey

=== Irish Junior Cup ===
Season	Winners	Score	Runners up
1898	Three Rock Rovers II		
1910	Three Rock Rovers II		
1912	Three Rock Rovers II		
1920	Three Rock Rovers II		
1964	Cliftonville II	3–2	Three Rock Rovers II
1977	Lisnagarvey II	3–1	Three Rock Rovers II
1979	Three Rock Rovers II	3–2	Cork Harlequins II
1983	Cookstown II	3–1	Three Rock Rovers III
1998	Three Rock Rovers II	4–0	Annadale II
2000	Annadale II	3–0	Three Rock Rovers II
2015	Monkstown II	6–2	Three Rock Rovers II
2017	Cork Church of Ireland II	3–1	Three Rock Rovers II
2019	Three Rock Rovers II	4–1	Instonians II
2025	Three Rock Rovers II	3–0	Portrane II

=== Europe ===
Three Rock Rovers have also represented Ireland in European competitions. In addition to playing in the Euro Hockey League, Three Rock Rovers have also played in European indoor hockey competitions. Three Rock Rovers hosted the 2015 EuroHockey Club Trophy.

Season	Round
2008–09 Euro Hockey League	Round of 16
2015 EuroHockey Club Trophy	4th
2018 EuroHockey Indoor Club Challenge II	1st
2017–18 Euro Hockey League	Round of 16
2019 EuroHockey Indoor Club Challenge I	2nd
2018–19 Euro Hockey League	Round of 16
2019–20 Euro Hockey League	Qualified

== Women's field hockey ==
Irish Junior Cup

Season	Winners	Score	Runners up
2001	Enniscorthy		Three Rock Rovers II
2003	Pegasus II	3–0	Three Rock Rovers II

== Home grounds ==
Three Rock Rovers were originally based in Foxrock, near the Stillorgan station on the Harcourt Street railway line. The club's original grounds were donated to Three Rock Rovers by Sir John Power of Power's Distillers. In 1930, Three Rock Rovers moved to Londonbridge Road, the headquarters of the Irish Hockey Union in Ringsend. In 1981 the club moved to its current grounds at Grange Road in Rathfarnham, South Dublin.

== Notable players ==
=== Men ===
Ireland internationals

When Ireland won the silver medal at the 1908 Summer Olympics, the squad included five Three Rock Rovers players – Henry Brown, Walter Campbell, Richard Gregg, Henry Murphy and Charles Power.

- Jonny Bruton
- Henry Brown
- Walter Campbell
- Jamie Carr
- Michael Darling
- Conor Empey
- Kyle Good
- Richard Gregg
- Bill Haughton
- Ben Johnson
- David Judge
- Luke Madeley
- Michael Maguire
- George McVeagh
- Henry Murphy
- Marshall Porter
- Charles Power
- Ben Walker
- Daragh Walsh
- Stephen West

Great Britain international

- David Judge: 1964

South Africa internationals

- Jody Hosking
- Richard Pautz

Others

Gordon Lambert: member of Seanad Éireann

=== Women ===
Ireland internationals

When the Ireland women's national field hockey team won the silver medal at the 2018 Women's Hockey World Cup, the squad included former Three Rock Rovers player Deirdre Duke.

- Deirdre Duke

== Honours ==
=== Men ===
- Men's Irish Hockey League
  - Runners Up: 2017–18, 2018–19: 2
- EY Champions Trophy
  - Winners: 2017, 2018, 2019: 3
- Irish Senior Cup
  - Winners: 1897–98, 1907–08, 1938–39, 1952–53, 1958–59, 1961–62, 1962–63, 1963–64, 1973–74, 2013–14, 2017–18, 2018–19: 12
  - Runners Up: 1912, 1960, 1977, 1986, 1998, 1999: 6
- Irish Junior Cup
  - Winners: 1897–98, 1909–10, 1911–12, 1919–20, 1978–79, 1997–98, 2018–19: 7
  - Runners Up: 1964, 1977, 1983, 2000, 2015, 2017: 6
- EuroHockey Indoor Club Challenge II
  - Winners: 2018: 1
- EuroHockey Indoor Club Challenge I
  - Runners Up: 2019: 1
- All-Ireland Club Championship
  - Winners: 2008: 1

=== Women ===
- Irish Junior Cup
  - Runners Up: 2001, 2003: 2
