= Pridmore =

Pridmore is a surname. Notable people with the surname include:

- Ben Pridmore (born 1976), British memory sport competitor and accountant
- Jason Pridmore (born 1969), American motorcycle racer
- J. E. O. Pridmore (1867-1940), British-American architect
- Reg Pridmore (born 1939), English motorcycle road racer
- Reggie Pridmore (1886-1918), English field hockey player
