= Richard Gregg (field hockey) =

Field hockey player

Olympic medal record

Men's field hockey

Representing (United Kingdom) Great Britain (Ireland)
Silver medal – second place	1908 London	Team

Richard George Stanhope Gregg (9 December 1883 – 20 May 1945) was an Irish field hockey player born in Portsmouth, England. He played for, amongst others, Three Rock Rovers and Ireland. Together with fellow Rovers players, Henry Murphy and Charles Power, he was a member of the Ireland team that won the silver medal at the 1908 London Olympics. Gregg played in both the 3–1 win against Wales on 29 October and in the 8–1 defeat against England in the final on 31 October. . The Ireland team was part of the Great Britain Olympic team.
