= Monkstown Hockey Club =

Irish field hockey club

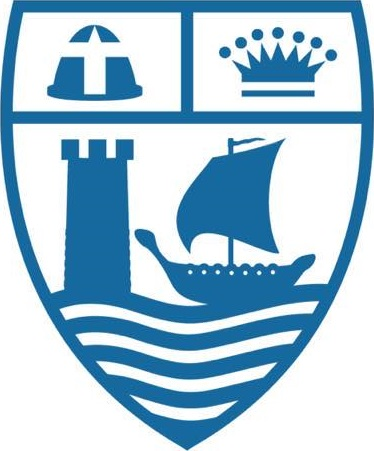
- Union: Hockey Ireland
- Full name: Monkstown Hockey Club
- Nickname(s): Town
- Founded: 1894
- Ground: Rathdown School; Upper Glenageary Road; Glenageary; Dún Laoghaire–Rathdown; Ireland; 53.277070°N 6.131873°W
- Coach: Gareth Watkins (men); Simon Lowry (women)
- Website: monkstownhockeyclub.com
- League: Men's Irish Hockey League; Women's Irish Hockey League

Monkstown Hockey Club (Irish: Cumann Haca Baile na Manach) is a field hockey club based at Rathdown School in Dún Laoghaire–Rathdown, Ireland. The club was founded in 1894 and was originally based in Monkstown, Dublin. The club's senior men's team plays in the Men's Irish Hockey League and the Men's Irish Senior Cup. The club's senior women's team plays in the Women's Irish Hockey League and the Women's Irish Senior Cup. Reserve teams play in the Men's Irish Junior Cup and the Women's Irish Junior Cup. Monkstown have also represented Ireland in European competitions, winning the 2013–14 EuroHockey Club Trophy.

== History ==
=== Men's field hockey ===
==== Early years ====
Monkstown Hockey Club was founded on 17 September 1894 following a meeting at Kenny's Hotel in Dún Laoghaire. Together with Dublin University and Three Rock Rovers, Monkstown were among the pioneering field hockey clubs in Ireland. In 1906 the club won its first national trophy when the second team won the Irish Junior Cup.

==== Irish Senior Cup ====
In 1911 Monkstown won the Irish Senior Cup for first time with a squad that included three players – William Graham, Jack Peterson and Walter Peterson – who won the silver medal with Ireland at the 1908 Summer Olympics. After winning a second Irish Senior Cup final in 1914, Monkstown would have to wait nearly a whole century before winning the cup for a third time.

Season	Winners	Score	Runners up
1910	Monkstown	3–1	Queen's University
1914	Monkstown	1–0	Queen's University
1923	Banbridge	3–2	Monkstown
1970	Lisnagarvey	1–0 (Note: After extra time)	Monkstown
1972	Queen's University	3–0	Monkstown
2008	Pembroke Wanderers	3–0	Monkstown
2010	Glennane	4–1	Monkstown
2011	Cookstown	4–3	Monkstown
2013	Monkstown	5–4	Pembroke Wanderers
2015–16	Monkstown	2–2 (Note: After extra time; Monkstown won 6–5 after a penalty shoot-out.)	Lisnagarvey
2016–17	Banbridge	3–1	Monkstown

==== Men's Irish Hockey League ====
In 2008–09 Monkstown were founder members of the Men's Irish Hockey League. In June 2012 Graham Shaw was appointed coach of the men's team at Monkstown. Initially Shaw planned to retire as a player. However he subsequently continued on as a player coach and, with a team that included David Fitzgerald, Peter Caruth and Kyle Good, he guided Monkstown to three successive Men's Irish Hockey League titles between 2012–13 and 2014–15.

Season	Winners	Score	Runners up
2012–13	Monkstown		Banbridge
2013–14	Monkstown	2–1	Banbridge
2014–15	Monkstown	2–1	Banbridge

==== EY Champions Trophy ====
Year	Winners	Score	Runners up
2017	Three Rock Rovers	2–1	Monkstown

==== Irish Junior Cup ====
In 1906 the club won its first national trophy when the second team won the Irish Junior Cup.

Season	Winners	Score	Runners up
1906	Monkstown II	5–0 (Note: After replay. First game finished 2–2 after extra time.)	Lisnagarvey
1908	Monkstown II		
1909	Monkstown II	3–0	Whitehead
1946	Portrush	2–1	Monkstown II
1951	Monkstown II		
1952	RUC	2–1	Monkstown II
1968	Cork Church of Ireland II		Monkstown II
1969	Monkstown II		Belvedere II
1982	Newry	4–3	Monkstown II
2010	Monkstown II	3–1	YMCA II
2013	Monkstown II	2–1	Banbridge II
2014	Pembroke Wanderers II		Monkstown II
2015	Monkstown II	6–1	Three Rock Rovers II
2016	Cork Church of Ireland II	2–0	Monkstown II

==== Europe ====
Monkstown have also represented Ireland in European competitions.

Season	Round
2014 EuroHockey Club Trophy	Winners
2014–15 Euro Hockey League	Pool stage
2015–16 Euro Hockey League	Pool stage

=== Women's field hockey ===
Although Monkstown women's teams were Irish Junior Cup finalists in both 1909–10 and 1923–24, it was not until 1982 that a regular women's team was formed. However, in 1991, following a difference of opinion about membership fees, the women's section broke away and formed a separate club called Glenageary Hockey Club. In 2008 Monkstown formed a new women's team. The team initially entered Leinster Division 14 but regularly gained promotion. In 2009 Monkstown were "promoted" directly from Division 12 to Division 8 after three 11–0 wins. They then went onto win the Division 8 title by February with a final goal tally of +61. By 2011 the club had gained promotion to Division 6. In 2012 Monkstown absorbed the Dalkey Ladies Hockey Club. This saw the women's section expand to four teams. In the 2014–15 season all four teams gained promotion from their respective divisions.

In 2016, Monkstown merged with Hermes Ladies' Hockey Club and the women's senior team began playing in the Women's Irish Hockey League under the name Hermes-Monkstown. With a team that included Nicola Evans, Anna O'Flanagan and Chloe Watkins, Hermes-Monkstown subsequently finished the 2016–17 season as runners-up to UCD in both the national league and the EY Champions Trophy. Playing as Hermes-Monkstown, the club also represented Ireland in the 2017 EuroHockey Club Champions Cup. In May 2018 Monkstown represented Ireland in the Women's EuroHockey Club Trophy. They also hosted the tournament at Rathdown School. In 2018–19 Monkstown became founder members of the new Women's Irish Hockey League Division 2.

== Home grounds ==
Monkstown originally played their home games at Tivoli Terrace in Monkstown, Dublin. Their original ground was the lower portion of a cricket pitch belonging to Corrig School. Between 1898 and 1906 the club was based at Monkstown Avenue. Between 1906 and 1919 they again played at Tivoli Terrace. For a brief period after that, the club played at Crosthwaite Park before moving to more extensive grounds at Royal Terrace in 1922. The club remained at Royal Terrace until the ground was sold to Dún Laoghaire Corporation in 1989. The club is now based at Rathdown School.

== Notable players ==
=== Men's internationals ===
Ireland

On 26 January 1895 the Ireland men's national field hockey team played in the first ever international field hockey match when they defeated Wales 3–0 in Rhyl. The team included future Monkstown player, J. E. Mills. The Men's Leinster Senior Cup is named the Mills Cup in his honour. When Ireland won the silver medal at the 1908 Summer Olympics, the squad included three Monkstown players – William Graham, Jack Peterson and Walter Peterson.

- Tommy Allen
- W. H. Atkinson
- R. Beatty
- Jonny Bruton
- Jamie Carr
- David Carson
- Peter Caruth
- David Cole
- Lee Cole
- Stephen Cole
- J. C. Cox
- F. R. M. Crozier
- David Fitzgerald
- Kyle Good
- William Graham
- J. Gray
- W. Knapp
- R. Satchwell
- Graham Shaw
- G. M. Sterling
- R. C. Morrison
- J. E. Mills
- David O'Driscoll
- Herbert Peterson
- Jack Peterson
- Walter Peterson
- T. F. Perrin
- R. Rice
- David R. Rowlands
- G. Tyndall
- Trevor Watkins
- Gordon Watkins
- Gareth Watkins

=== Women's internationals ===
Ireland

When the Ireland women's national field hockey team won the silver medal at the 2018 Women's Hockey World Cup, the squad included three former Hermes-Monkstown players:

- Nicola Evans
- Anna O'Flanagan
- Chloe Watkins

=== Others ===
Ireland men's rugby union international

- Jordan Larmour

== Honours ==
=== Men ===
- EuroHockey Club Trophy
  - Winners: 2013–14: 1
- Men's Irish Hockey League
  - Winners: 2012–13, 2013–14, 2014–15: 3
- Irish Senior Cup
  - Winners: 1909–10, 1913–14, 2012–13, 2015–16: 4
  - Runners Up: 1923, 1970, 1972, 2008, 2010, 2011: 6
- Irish Junior Cup
  - Winners: 1905–06, 1907–08, 1908–09, 1950–51, 1968–69, 2009–10, 2012–13, 2014–15: 7
  - Runners Up: 1946, 1952, 1968, 1982, 2014, 2016: 6
- EY Champions Trophy
  - Runners Up: 2017: 1

=== Women ===
Hermes-Monkstown

- Irish Senior Cup
  - Winners: 2022–23
- Women's Irish Hockey League
  - Runners Up: 2016–17: 1
- EY Champions Trophy
  - Runners Up: 2017: 1

Monkstown

- Irish Junior Cup
  - Winners: 1923–24: 1
  - Runners Up: 1909–10: 1
