= David Judge (field hockey) =

British field hockey player

Personal information
- Full name: Harold David Judge
- Born: 19 January 1936 Dublin, Ireland
- Died: 17 October 2015 (aged 79) Killiney, Dún Laoghaire–Rathdown, Ireland
- Height: 180 cm (5 ft 11 in)
- Weight: 70 kg (154 lb)

Sport
- Sport: Field hockey
- Position: Defender
Youth career
- Years: Team
- 194x–194x: Avoca School
- 194x–195x: Portora Royal School
- 194x–195x: → Ulster Schools
Senior career
Years	Team	Caps	Goals
195x–196x	Dublin University	-	-
195x–196x	→ Buccaneers	-	-
196x–197x	Three Rock Rovers	-	-
195x–197x	→ Leinster	-	-
National team
Years	Team	Caps	Goals
1957–1978	Ireland	124	-
1963–1964	Great Britain		-
Coaching career
- 198x–199x: Avoca
- 198x–199x: Old Alex

Harold David Judge (1936–2015), also known as David Judge, was an Irish-born Great Britain and Ireland men's field hockey international who represented Great Britain at the 1964 Summer Olympics, and between 1957 and 1978 made 124 senior appearances for Ireland. He also represented Ireland at the 1970 and 1972 EuroHockey Nations Championships and at the 1978 Men's Hockey World Cup. In 2006 he was inducted into the inaugural Irish Hockey Association Hall of Fame.

== Early life ==
Judge was raised in Rathgar. He had three siblings – two sisters, Sylvia and Maeve and a brother, Norman. His earliest introduction to field hockey was playing the game in the back garden with Norman. Judge was educated at Avoca School, Portora Royal School and Trinity College Dublin.

== Domestic teams ==
=== Early years ===
Judge was a schoolboy field hockey player with both Avoca School and Portora Royal School. He also represented Ulster at schoolboy level.

=== Dublin University ===
While studying at Trinity College Dublin, Judge played for Dublin University. He was also selected to play for the Buccaneers touring team. In 2011 Judge was inducted into the Dublin University Hockey Club Hall of Fame.

=== Three Rock Rovers ===
After graduating from Trinity, Judge played for Three Rock Rovers, helping them win the Irish Senior Cup on several occasions.

== International ==
=== Ireland ===
Between 1957 and 1978 Judge made 124 senior appearances for Ireland, making his debut for Ireland in an away game against Scotland. He represented Ireland at the 1970 and 1972 EuroHockey Nations Championships and at the 1978 Men's Hockey World Cup. He also captained Ireland on 30 occasions and helped them win the 1972 Santander Trophy. In 2006 Judge was inducted into the inaugural Irish Hockey Association Hall of Fame. Other inductees included his former Ireland and Great Britain teammate, Harry Cahill, alongside Maeve Kyle and Thelma Hopkins.

=== Great Britain ===
Together with fellow Ireland international, Harry Cahill, Judge represented Great Britain at the 1964 Summer Olympics. In December 1963 he toured India and Ceylon with Great Britain.

Tournaments	Place	Team
1963 tour of India and Ceylon		Great Britain
1964 Summer Olympics	9th	Great Britain
1970 Men's EuroHockey Nations Championship	9th	Ireland
1972 Men's EuroHockey Nations Championship		Ireland
1972 Santander Trophy	1st	Ireland
1977 Men's Intercontinental Cup	2nd	Ireland
1978 Men's Hockey World Cup	12th	Ireland

== Later life ==
In 1981 Judge participated in Ireland's version of Superstars, competing against, amongst others, Declan Burns, Bernard Brogan and Barry McGuigan. In the final, Judge won the rowing event.

After his retirement as a field hockey player, Judge served as a coach at both Avoca and Old Alex, guiding both teams to club titles. He also served as president of the Leinster Hockey Association, overseeing the merger of the women's and men's branches. He also served as an assistant coach with the Ireland men.

Judge died on 17 October 2015, aged 79. He was survived by his wife Grania and four children.

== Honours ==
Ireland

- Santander Trophy
  - Winners: 1972: 1
- Men's Intercontinental Cup
  - Runners-up: 1977
