= Jack Peterson (field hockey) =

Ireland men's field hockey international

Personal information
- Full name: John William Peterson
- Born: 22 February 1880 County Dublin
- Died: 23 May 1964 (aged 84)

Sport
- Sport: Field hockey
- Position: Left full-back/Defender
Senior career
Years	Team	Caps	Goals
1896–1899	Avoca	-	-
1899–1907	Palmerstown	-	-
1907–19xx	Monkstown	-	-
National team
Years	Team	Caps	Goals
1901–1914	Ireland	20	-
Medal record
Representing Ireland/ (United Kingdom) Great Britain
Summer Olympics
Silver medal – second place	1908 London	Team

John William Peterson (22 February 1880 – 23 May 1964) was an Ireland men's field hockey international. He was a member of the Ireland team that played at the 1908 Summer Olympics, winning a silver medal. Peterson was one of six brothers who played field hockey for Avoca, Palmerstown and Ireland. His brother, Walter Peterson, also played for Ireland at the 1908 Summer Olympics. Jack and Walter Peterson were also team mates at Monkstown. Peterson also won Irish Senior Cup titles with both Palmerstown and Monkstown.

== Early years, family and education ==
Jack Peterson was born into a Church of Ireland family on 22 February 1880. He was the son of Nicholas George Peterson, a chartered accountant and auditor who was originally from Cork, and Marion Peterson (née Penny) who was originally from England. Peterson was one of six brothers. He also had a sister, Mary Maud. In 1901 the Peterson family lived at 14 Sydney Parade Avenue in Donnybrook, Dublin. In 1911 they were living at 6 Eaton Place in Blackrock, Dublin. Like his father and two of his brothers, Herbert and Cecil, Peterson worked as an accountant.

== Domestic teams ==
Jack Peterson and his five brothers – Walter Peterson, William Peterson, Nicholas Peterson, Herbert Peterson and Cecil Peterson – began playing for Avoca in 1896. In 1899 the brothers moved to Palmerstown. They formed the nucleus of team that between 1900 and 1905 lost only two matches out of 160 played. During this run they won the Irish Senior Cup on four occasions. The two defeats were both cup matches against Dublin University, and both games were lost by a single goal. In one season Palmerstown scored 102 goals and conceded just seven. After Palmerstown disbanded in 1907, most of the brothers, including Jack and Walter moved to Monkstown where he won two more Irish Senior Cup titles in 1911 and 1914. In addition to his five brothers, his team mates at Palmerstown and Monkstown also included J.E. Mills and William Graham.

== Ireland international ==
Between 1901 and 1914 Jack Peterson made 20 senior appearances for Ireland. Peterson played as a left full-back and, for most of his international career, he was partnered at right-back by his brother, Walter Peterson. In 1904 the Peterson brothers were members of the Ireland team that won the Triple Crown. Ireland won the title after defeating Wales 4–2 away and England 3–2 at home. As well as his brother Walter at right-back, the team also included his brothers Nicholas (right-half), William (inside-left) and Cecil (midfield). Another brother, Herbert made two Ireland appearances between 1900 and 1902. In total the brothers won sixty six caps between them. Walter and Jack Peterson were both members of the Ireland team that played at the 1908 Summer Olympics, winning a silver medal. Jack Peterson was not listed in the official 1908 Summer Olympics report. However the Olympic historian, Bill Mallon, lists him as an Olympic competitor.

== Honours ==
Ireland

- Summer Olympics
  - Runners Up: 1908: 1
- Triple Crown
  - Winners: 1904: 1

Monkstown

- Irish Senior Cup
  - Winners: 1910, 1914: 2

Palmerstown

- Irish Senior Cup
  - Winners: 1899–1900, 1902–03, 1903–04, 1904–05: 4
