= Henry Murphy (field hockey) =

Irish field hockey player

Olympic medal record

Men's field hockey

Representing (United Kingdom) Great Britain (Ireland)
Silver medal – second place	1908 London	Team

Henry Lawson Murphy (12 December 1882 – 5 January 1942) was an Irish field hockey player. He played for, amongst others, Three Rock Rovers and Ireland. Together with fellow Rovers players, Richard Gregg and Charles Power, he was a member of the Ireland team that won the silver medal at the 1908 London Olympics. Murphy played in both the 3–1 win against Wales on 29 October and in the 8–1 defeat against England in the final on 31 October. The Ireland team was part of the Great Britain Olympic team.
