= Walter Peterson (field hockey) =

Ireland men's field hockey international

Personal information
- Full name: Walter Ernest Peterson
- Born: November 7, 1883 Stillorgan, County Dublin
- Died: 1921?

Sport
- Sport: Field hockey
- Position: Right full-back/Defender
Youth career
- Team
- –: Avoca School
Senior career
Years	Team	Caps	Goals
1896–1899	Avoca	-	-
1899–1907	Palmerstown	-	-
1907–19xx	Monkstown	-	-
1903–1912	Leinster	14	-
National team
Years	Team	Caps	Goals
1903–1914	Ireland	23	-
Medal record
Representing (United Kingdom) Great Britain (Ireland)
Summer Olympics
Silver medal – second place	1908 London	Team

Walter Ernest Peterson (born 7 November 1883) was an Ireland men's field hockey international. He was a member of the Ireland team that played at the 1908 Summer Olympics, winning a silver medal. Peterson was one of six brothers who played field hockey for Avoca, Palmerstown and Ireland. His brother, Jack Peterson, also played for Ireland at the 1908 Summer Olympics. Walter and Jack Peterson were also team mates at Monkstown. Peterson also won Irish Senior Cup titles with both Palmerstown and Monkstown.

== Early years, family and education ==
Walter Peterson was born into a Church of Ireland family on 7 November 1883 at Ulster Terrace, Stillorgan, County Dublin. He was the youngest son of Nicholas George Peterson, a chartered accountant and auditor who was originally from Cork, and Marion Peterson (née Penny) who was originally from England. Peterson was the youngest of six brothers. He also had an older sister, Mary Maud. He attended Avoca School, where he began to play field hockey. In 1901 the Peterson family lived at 14 Sydney Parade Avenue in Donnybrook, Dublin. In 1911 they were living at 6 Eaton Place in Blackrock, Dublin. Peterson worked as insurance broker.

== Domestic teams ==
Walter Peterson and his five brothers – Jack Peterson, William Peterson, Nicholas Peterson, Herbert Peterson and Cecil Peterson – began playing for Avoca in 1896. In 1899 the brothers moved to Palmerstown. They formed the nucleus of team that between 1900 and 1905 lost only two matches out of 160 played. During this run they won the Irish Senior Cup on four occasions. The two defeats were both cup matches against Dublin University, and both games were lost by a single goal. In one season Palmerstown scored 102 goals and conceded just seven. After Palmerstown disbanded in 1907, most of the brothers, including Walter and Jack moved to Monkstown where he won two more Irish Senior Cup titles in 1911 and 1914. In addition to his five brothers, his team mates at Palmerstown and Monkstown also included J.E. Mills and William Graham. Between 1903 and 1912 Walter Peterson also made 14 appearances for Leinster at interprovincial level.

== Ireland international ==
Between 1903 and 1914 Walter Peterson made 23 senior appearances for Ireland. He made his debut in 1903 in a 7–0 win against Wales. Peterson played as a right full-back and, for most of his international career, he was partnered at left-back by his brother, Jack Peterson. In 1904 the Peterson brothers were members of the Ireland team that won the Triple Crown. Ireland won the title after defeating Wales 4–2 away and England 3–2 at home. As well as his brother Jack at left-back, the team also included his brothers Nicholas (right-half), William (inside-left) and Cecil (midfield). Another brother, Herbert made two Ireland appearances between 1900 and 1902. In total the brothers won sixty six caps between them. Walter and Jack Peterson were both members of the Ireland team that played at the 1908 Summer Olympics, winning a silver medal. Ireland defeated Wales 3–1 in a semi-final before losing 8–1 to England in the final. Peterson made his last appearance for Ireland in a 2–2 draw away to England in early 1914.

== Umpire ==
Walter Peterson was listed as an umpire at an Ireland–England international in 1921.

== Honours ==
Ireland

- Summer Olympics
  - Runners Up: 1908: 1
- Triple Crown
  - Winners: 1904: 1

Monkstown

- Irish Senior Cup
  - Winners: 1910, 1914: 2

Palmerstown

- Irish Senior Cup
  - Winners: 1899–1900, 1902–03, 1903–04, 1904–05: 4
