= Richard Campbell (priest) =

Richard Stuart Dobbs Campbell (1844 – 8 March 1913) was Dean of Clonmacnoise from 1904 until 1912.

Campbell was educated at Trinity College, Dublin and was the incumbent at Athlone. He married Lily Sarah Wilhelmina Verschoyle in 1880. Their son Walter was an Olympic medallist in field hockey.
