= Hugh Walker (field hockey) =

Scottish field hockey player

Personal information
- Born: 1 February 1888 Gavinton, Scotland
- Died: 29 October 1958 (aged 70) Nigg, Scotland

Sport
- Sport: Field hockey
Senior career
| Years | Team | Caps | Goals |
| 1908 | Edinburgh Univ | - | - |
National team
| Years | Team | Caps | Goals |
| – | Scotland | | - |
Medal record
Men's field hockey
Representing Great Britain
| Bronze medal – third place | 1908 London | Team competition |

Hugh Stewart Walker (1 February 1888 – 29 October 1958) was a field hockey player from Scotland who competed in the 1908 Summer Olympics. In 1908 he won the bronze medal as member of the Scotland team.

== Biography ==
Walker studied at University of Edinburgh and while playing for the Edinburgh University Hockey Club he was capped by Scotland. He also played for the East at representative level.

He served with the Queen's Own Cameron Highlanders in France during World War I.
