= John Burt (field hockey) =

Scottish field hockey player

Personal information
- Born: 15 April 1877 Glasgow, Scotland
- Died: 29 April 1935 (aged 58) Rutherglen, Scotland

Sport
- Sport: Field hockey
- Position: Goalkeeper
Senior career
| Years | Team | Caps | Goals |
| 1905–1908 | Rutherglen | - | - |
National team
| Years | Team | Caps | Goals |
| –1909 | Scotland | | - |
Medal record
Men's field hockey
Representing Great Britain
| Bronze medal – third place | 1908 London | Team competition |

John Burt (15 April 1877 – 29 April 1935) was a field hockey player from Scotland. He competed in the 1908 Summer Olympics as a member of the Scottish team, for the United Kingdom, which won the bronze medal. His brother, Alexander, also was a member of the Scottish team.

== Biography ==
Burt was born in Glasgow to a farming family and played club hockey for Rutherglen Hockey Club.

Burt was a goalkeeper and captained his country.

After retiring from playing Burt was later become president of the Scottish Hockey Union.
