= Gerald Logan =

Field hockey player

Personal information
- Born: 29 December 1879 Wimbledon, England
- Died: 29 April 1951 (aged 71) Folkestone, England

Sport
- Sport: Field hockey
- Position: Inside-right
Senior career
Years	Team	Caps	Goals
1903–1911	Hampstead	-	-
National team
Years	Team	Caps	Goals
1908–1909	England	9	-
Medal record
Men's field hockey
Representing Great Britain
Gold medal – first place	1908 London	Team competition

Gerald Logan (29 December 1879 – 29 April 1951) was a field hockey player, who won a gold medal with the England team at the 1908 Summer Olympics in London.

== Biography ==
Logan was educated at Kingston Grammar School and played for inside-right for Hampstead Hockey Club.

He represented Surrey at county level and the represented Southern Counties at representative level. He played for England until 1909.
