= William Graham (field hockey) =

Ireland men's field hockey international

Personal information
- Full name: William Evans Graham ^{[Note 1]}
- Born: January 29, 1886 County Dublin
- Died: 5 September 1947 (aged 61)

Sport
- Sport: Field hockey
- Position: Left half back/Midfielder
Youth career
- Team
- –: Kingstown Grammar School
Senior career
Years	Team	Caps	Goals
18xx–1907	Palmerstown	-	-
1907–19xx	Monkstown	-	-
National team
Years	Team	Caps	Goals
1907–1909	Ireland	10	-
Medal record
Representing (United Kingdom) Great Britain (Ireland)
Summer Olympics
Silver medal – second place	1908 London	Team

William Evans Graham ^{[Note 1]} MC, was an Ireland men's field hockey international. He was a member of the Ireland team that played at the 1908 Summer Olympics, winning a silver medal.

Graham also won Irish Senior Cup titles with both Palmerstown and Monkstown. He later served as an Ireland selector before becoming president of the Irish Hockey Union during the 1933–34 season. He was club president at Monkstown from 1927 until 1936. Graham was also a medical doctor.

== Domestic teams ==
Graham first played field hockey at Kingstown Grammar School before joining Palmerstown. He subsequently helped Palmerstown win the Irish Senior Cup. After the club disbanded in 1907, Graham and most of the Palmerstown squad moved to Monkstown where he won two more Irish Senior Cup titles in 1911 and 1914. His team mates at Palmerstown and Monkstown included J.E. Mills and the Peterson brothers, most notably Jack and Walter.

== Ireland international ==
From 1907 to 1909 Graham made 10 senior appearances for Ireland. Graham was a member of the Ireland team that played at the 1908 Summer Olympics, winning a silver medal. Ireland defeated Wales 3–1 in a semi-final before losing 8–1 to England in the final.

== First World War ==
During the First World War he served as an officer in the Royal Army Medical Corps. In 1917 he was seriously wounded during an advance in Flanders, causing a leg to be amputated, but subsequently won the Military Cross for gallantry and devotion duty when in command of stretcher bearers.

== Honours ==
Ireland

- Summer Olympics
  - Runners Up: 1908: 1

Monkstown

- Irish Senior Cup
  - Winners: 1910, 1914: 2

Palmerstown

- Irish Senior Cup
  - Winners: 1904–05: 1 ?

== Notes ==
- ^1 Some sources give his middle name as Ernest.
