= James Williams (field hockey) =

Welsh field hockey player

Personal information
- Born: 28 July 1878 Penarth, Wales
- Died: 21 December 1929 (aged 51) Whitchurch, Wales

Sport
- Sport: Field hockey
Senior career
Years	Team	Caps	Goals
1908	Newport	-	-
National team
Years	Team	Caps	Goals
1908	Wales		-
Medal record
Representing Great BritainWales
Olympic Games
Bronze medal – third place	1908 London	Team

James Ralph Williams (28 July 1878 – 21 December 1929) was a field hockey player from Wales, who competed in the 1908 Summer Olympics and won the bronze medal as member of the Welsh team.

== Biography ==
Williams was born in Penarth, the son of an Army colonel. He was educated at Marlborough College.

With only six teams participating in the field hockey tournament at the 1908 Olympic Games in London, he represented Wales under the Great British flag, where the team were awarded a bronze medal despite Wales only playing in and losing one match.

He played club hockey for Newport Hockey Club and would later become secretary of the South Wales Hockey Association.

By trade, Williams was a director with Watts, Watts & Co. Ltd, who were a shipowners in Cardiff and London.
