= Tommy Allen (field hockey) =

Irish field hockey player

Personal information
- Full name: Thomas J. Allen
- Born: 1946 (age 79–80)

Sport
- Sport: Field hockey
- Position: Goalkeeper
Senior career
Years	Team	Caps	Goals
1960–1987	Monkstown	-	-
1973–1983	Leinster	-	-
National team
Years	Team	Caps	Goals
1974–1981	Ireland	28	-
197x–198x	Ireland (indoor)	60	-
Coaching career
- 1990s–2010s: Monkstown

Tommy Allen is a former Ireland men's field hockey international goalkeeper. Allen represented Ireland as both an outdoor and indoor player. He represented Ireland at the 1978 Men's Hockey World Cup. He played club field hockey for Monkstown and represented Leinster at interprovincial level.

== Domestic teams ==
=== Monkstown ===
Allen joined Monkstown as a 14-year-old in 1960. Following a number of seasons playing as a goalkeeper for the third and second teams, he became a regular first team member in 1968. He helped Monkstown win two Leinster league titles and two Mills Cup finals. He also helped the club reach two Irish Senior Cup finals in 1970 and 1972. He continued playing for Monkstown until 1987. He subsequently served the club as a team manager. Allen is also an honorary life member at Monkstown.

=== Leinster ===
Between 1973 and 1983, Allen represented Leinster at interprovincial level. He was a member of four Leinster Regiment Interprovincial Cup winning teams.

== Ireland international ==
Between 1974 and 1981 Allen made 28 senior appearances for Ireland, making his debut against Wales in 1969. He also represented Ireland at under-23 level. He made his senior international debut against Wales in 1974. He subsequently represented Ireland at the 1978 Men's Hockey World Cup. Allen retired after the 1981 Men's Intercontinental Cup tournament. However he continued to play for the Ireland indoor field hockey team, making 60 appearances. His Ireland teammates included Jimmy Kirkwood.

Tournaments	Place
1977 Men's Intercontinental Cup	2nd
1978 Men's EuroHockey Nations Championship	
1978 Men's Hockey World Cup	12th
1979 Australia/New Zealand tour	
1981 Men's Intercontinental Cup	4th

== Honours ==
Ireland

- Men's Intercontinental Cup
  - Runners Up: 1977

Monkstown

- Irish Senior Cup
  - Runners Up: 1970, 1972: 2
- Leinster Division One
  - Winners: 1976, 1982: 2
- Mills Cup
  - Winners: 1974, 1979: 2

Leinster

- Leinster Regiment Interprovincial Cup
  - Winners: : 4
