= Ivan Laing =

Scottish field hockey player

Personal information
- Born: 18 August 1885 Hawick, Scotland
- Died: 30 November 1917 (aged 32) Metz-en-Couture, Pas-de-Calais, France

Sport
- Sport: Field hockey
Senior career
Years	Team	Caps	Goals
1908	Hawick	-	-
National team
Years	Team	Caps	Goals
–	Scotland		-
Medal record
Men's field hockey
Representing Great Britain
Bronze medal – third place	1908 London	Team competition

Ivan Laing (18 August 1885 – 30 November 1917) was a field hockey player from Scotland who competed in the 1908 Summer Olympics. Born in Hawick, and a member of the Hawick Hockey Club, in 1908 he won the bronze medal as member of the Scotland team. Laing also played rugby for Hawick RFC, and swam for Hawick Amateur Swimming Club.

== Biography ==
Laing was born in Glasgow, the son of John Turnbull Laing, a factory owner. He was educated at New College, Eastbourne, and at Verviers in Belgium.

Laing was killed in action aged 32 during World War I, serving as a lieutenant with the Coldstream Guards at Metz-en-Couture. He was buried at the Metz-en-Couture Communal Cemetery nearby.

== See also ==
- List of Olympians killed in World War I
