= Alexander Burt =

Scottish field hockey player

Personal information
- Born: 9 April 1884 Glasgow, Scotland
- Died: 1 February 1967 (aged 82) Cleland, Scotland

Sport
- Sport: Field hockey
Senior career
Years	Team	Caps	Goals
1908	Rutherglen	-	-
National team
Years	Team	Caps	Goals
1905–1910	Scotland	20	-
Medal record
Men's field hockey
Representing Great Britain
Bronze medal – third place	1908 London	Team competition

Alexander Baird Burt (9 April 1884 – 1 February 1967) was a field hockey player from Scotland who competed in the 1908 Summer Olympics as a member of the Scottish team, which won the bronze medal. His brother, John, also was a member of the Scottish team.

== Biography ==
Burt was born in Glasgow to a farming family and played club hockey for Rutherglen Hockey Club.

Burt emigrated to the United States in the 1920s and was a leather merchant by trade but would return to Scotland in later life.
