= Eric Green (field hockey) =

Field hockey player

Harry Freeman
Personal information
- Born: 28 August 1878 Leatherhead, England
- Died: 23 December 1972 (aged 94) Stanford Dingley, England

Sport
- Sport: Field hockey
- Position: Outside-left
Senior career
Years	Team	Caps	Goals
1900–1901	Eastbourne	-	-
1903–1904	Seaford	-	-
1905–1911	Staines	-	-
1912–1914	Wimbledon	-	-
National team
Years	Team	Caps	Goals
1902–1908	England	16	-
Medal record
Men's field hockey
Representing Great Britain
Gold medal – first place	1908 London	Team competition

Eric Hubert Green (8 August 1878 — 23 December 1972) was a field hockey player who won a gold medal with the England team at the 1908 Summer Olympics in London.

== Biography ==
Green was educated at St. Mark's School, Windsor. He played for Eastbourne Hockey Club and Sussex at county level before playing for Seaford and then in the position of outside-left for Staines Hockey Club. He later played for Wimbledon Hockey Club.

After hockey he became a correspondent for The Times.
