= Franks Robinson =

Irish field hockey player

Personal information
- Full name: Franks Lubbock Robinson
- Born: 30 March 1886 Rathdrum, County Wicklow, Ireland
- Died: 5 November 1949 (aged 63) Saint Brélade, Jersey

Sport
- Sport: Field hockey
Medal record
Men's field hockey
Representing (United Kingdom) Great Britain (Ireland)
Olympic Games
Silver medal – second place	1908 London	Team

Group Captain Franks Lubbock Robinson DSO MC DFC ADC (30 March 1886 – 5 November 1949) was an Irish field hockey player who competed in the 1908 Summer Olympics and a decorated officer of the Royal Marines, British Army and Royal Air Force.

Robinson was educated at Edinburgh House School and St Columba's College in Dublin. In 1908, he represented the United Kingdom of Great Britain and Ireland as a member of the Irish national team, which won the silver medal.

Previously a teacher who was master at Eton College, Robinson commissioned in the Royal Marines Artillery in 1914. In September 1915, he received the Military Cross while serving with the Artillery in Ypres, "for conspicuous gallantry and devotion to duty as Artillery Observing Officer." He later transferred into the army's Royal Flying Corps in 1916, became a pilot, and served with them in France and Belgium, then from 1917 in Mesopotamia (later Iraq) where he transferred next year to the new Royal Air Force. He earned the Distinguished Flying Cross in 1921.

In 1933, he was appointed an aide-de-camp to King George V. He retired in 1939.
