= Harry Cahill =

Irish field hockey goalkeeper, also playing for Great Britain

Personal information
- Full name: Harold Alexander Cahill
- Born: 9 June 1930 Drumcondra, Dublin; Ireland
- Died: 18 September 2009 (aged 79) France
- Height: 182 cm (6 ft 0 in)
- Weight: 73 kg (161 lb)

Sport
- Sport: Field hockey
- Position: Goalkeeper
Youth career
- Years: Team
- 194x–1947: Mountjoy School, Dublin
Senior career
Years	Team	Caps	Goals
1951–1955	Pembroke Wanderers	-	-
1951–195x	→ Leinster	-	-
1955–196x	Belfast YMCA	-	-
195x–195x	→ Ulster	-	-
196x–1974	Coventry & North Warwickshire	-	-
196x–196x	→ Warwickshire	-	-
196x–197x	Tamworth	-	-
196x–196x	→ Staffordshire	-	-
1974–198x	→ Buckinghamshire	-	-
198x–199x	Worthing	-	-
National team
Years	Team	Caps	Goals
1953–1973	Ireland	72	-
1960–1968	Great Britain	35	-

Harold Alexander Cahill (9 June 1930 – 18 September 2009), also known as Harry Cahill, was a Great Britain and Ireland men's field hockey international goalkeeper. He represented Great Britain at the 1960, 1964 and 1968 Summer Olympics. Between 1953 and 1973 he made 72 senior appearances for Ireland. He also represented Ireland at the 1970 Men's EuroHockey Nations Championship. In 1961 Cahill won an Irish Senior Cup winners medal with Belfast YMCA. In 2006 he was inducted into the inaugural Irish Hockey Association Hall of Fame. He died on 18 September 2009 while on holiday in France.

== Early years, family and education ==
Cahill was born on 9 June 1930 at 94 Fitzroy Avenue in Drumcondra, Dublin. His father, Henry Joshua Cahill, worked as a superintendent at Dublin Castle. His mother was Mary Maeve Cahill (née Golder). The Cahill family later lived at 13 Cremore Crescent in Glasnevin. His brother, Cecil Cahill, was an association football goalkeeper who played for both Shelbourne and Bohemians during the 1950s and 1960s. He also represented the Republic of Ireland at amateur level. His sister, Irene Cahill Johnston, was captain of the Ireland women's national field hockey team and later served as president of the Irish Ladies Hockey Union. Before concentrating on field hockey, Harry Cahill was also a notable track and field athlete. He was a member of the Civil Service Athletic Club. He was Irish triple jump champion in 1951–52 and finished third in the Irish decathlon championship in June 1953. He was selected to represent Ireland at the 1952 Summer Olympics but did not travel due to a lack of funds.

== Domestic teams ==
=== Mountjoy School, Dublin ===
Cahill was educated at Mountjoy School, Dublin where in 1947 he completed his Leaving Cert. He also played field hockey at Mountjoy School and was a member of the team that played in the 1947 Leinster Schoolboys' Hockey Senior Cup final, losing to The King's Hospital after a replay.

=== Pembroke Wanderers ===
In 1951 Cahill began playing as a left half-back for Pembroke Wanderers II's. Cahill had previously played as an association football goalkeeper, so in October 1951, after the team's regular goalkeeper emigrated, he began to fill in. He quickly found himself promoted to the first team and in November 1951 he was selected to play in goal for Leinster. Cahill also made his senior Ireland debut while playing for Wanderers. Both his sister, Irene Cahill Johnston, and his future wife, Ina, also played for Wanderers as well as the Ireland women's national field hockey team.

=== Belfast YMCA ===
Cahill worked in insurance and in 1955 his work required to him to move to Belfast where he played for Belfast YMCA, winning Irish Senior Cup with them in 1961. While with Belfast YMCA he also played for Ulster and represented Great Britain.

=== England ===
When playing for Coventry & North Warwickshire Hockey Club in the 1960s, Cahill trained with Coventry City F.C., then managed by Jimmy Hill. Hill allegedly offered Cahill professional terms as a footballer. In 1974 he helped Coventry & North Warwickshire win the Midlands League. He also played for Tamworth and eventually finished his field hockey playing career with Worthing, helping them to win the 1981 Sussex Cup when aged over 50. He continued playing in veterans competitions into his late 50s and also served as Worthing club captain between 1986 and 1990. At club level he often chose to play outfield as an inside-right. While playing in England, Cahill also represented Warwickshire, Staffordshire and Buckinghamshire at inter-county level.

== International ==
=== Ireland ===
Between 1953 and 1973 Cahill made 72 senior appearances for Ireland. He made his debut for Ireland in February 1953. He helped Ireland win the 1968 Home Nations Championship, the 1972 Santander Trophy and toured South Africa in 1973. He also represented Ireland at the 1970 Men's EuroHockey Nations Championship. On 29 April 1973, Cahill made his final appearance for Ireland against Belgium. In 2006 Cahill was inducted into the inaugural Irish Hockey Association Hall of Fame. Other inductees included David Judge, Maeve Kyle and Thelma Hopkins.

=== Great Britain ===
Cahill made 35 senior appearances for Great Britain. He represented Great Britain at the 1960, 1964 and 1968 Summer Olympics. In December 1963 he also toured India and Ceylon with Great Britain.

Tournaments	Place	Team
1960 Summer Olympics	4th	Great Britain
1963 tour of India and Ceylon		Great Britain
1964 Summer Olympics	9th	Great Britain
1968 Summer Olympics	12th	Great Britain
1970 Men's EuroHockey Nations Championship	9th	Ireland
1972 Santander Trophy	1st	Ireland
1973 tour of South Africa		Ireland

== Personal life ==
On 14 July 1967 Cahill married his wife, Ina, at St. George's Church, Dublin. They had two daughters. After retiring as a field hockey player he continued to play golf and squash. He also served as an umpire at Worthing Hockey Club and ran three marathons – London, Dublin and Worthing – when well into his 50s. He died on 18 September 2009 while on holiday in France.

== Honours ==
Ireland

- Home Nations Championship
  - Winners: 1968: 1
- Santander Trophy
  - Winners: 1972: 1

Coventry & North Warwickshire

- Midlands League
  - Winners: 1974: 1

Belfast YMCA

- Irish Senior Cup
  - Winners: 1961: 1

Mountjoy School, Dublin

- Leinster Schoolboys' Hockey Senior Cup
  - Runners up: 1947
