= Louis Baillon =

Falkland Islander field hockey player (1881–1965)

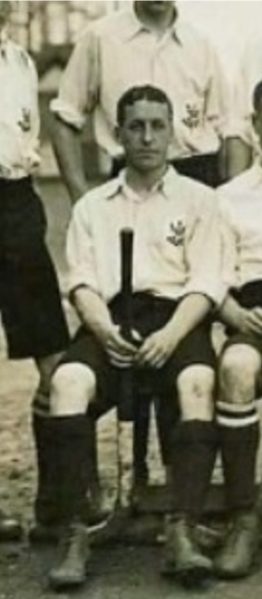
- Baillon in 1908

Personal information
- Born: 5 August 1881 Fox Bay, Falkland Islands
- Died: 2 September 1965 (aged 84) Brixworth, Northamptonshire, England

Sport
- Sport: Field hockey
- Position: full-back/left-back
Senior career
Years	Team	Caps	Goals
1908	Northampton	-	-
National team
Years	Team	Caps	Goals
–	England	9	-
Medal record
Men's field hockey
Representing Great Britain
Olympic Games
Gold medal – first place	1908 London	Team competition

Louis Charles Baillon (5 August 1881 – 2 September 1965) was a Falkland Islander field hockey player and businessman. Born in the Islands, he would eventually move to England with his family in 1888 and settle in Church Brampton. There, he was active in sports such as playing football for Wandsworth AFC and lawn tennis for Northamptonshire's team.

He started playing field hockey for Northampton's team and then earned nine caps as part of the England men's national field hockey team. While representing England, they won the gold medal in the team competition at the 1908 Summer Olympics. He became the first, and to date only Olympic gold medalist from the Falkland Islands as of June 2025.

== Early life ==
Louis Charles Baillon was born to father Louis Augustin Baillon, who was from Nottingham and emigrated to the Falkland Islands in the mid-1800s to work as a sheep farmer. He married there in 1876, and Louis Charles was later born on 5 August 1881 in Fox Bay, Falkland Islands, at the house of his grandmother, Julia Williams. He was the second of five children, and was baptised at St. Mary's Church on 30 January 1883. In 1888, the family moved back to England, settling in Church Brampton, Northamptonshire.

== Sports career ==
He started playing field hockey as a full-back for Northampton's team, and then went on to earn nine caps as a member of the England men's national field hockey team in the same position. Three of those appearances were at the 1908 Summer Olympics that were held in London. In the field hockey competition held at White City Stadium from 29 to 31 October, England went unbeaten, and won the gold medal in the event, (Note: The Irish, Scottish, Welsh national teams competed in the competition and medaled as well, though they are all credited as contemporary medalists for Great Britain.) making Baillon the only Falkland Islander to have won a gold medal at the Olympic Games as of June 2025.

Outside of field hockey, he was active in other sports. In football, he was a player for Wandsworth AFC. While in lawn tennis, he was still a member of Northamptonshire's county team at 50 years of age.

== Later years and personal life ==
Baillon married Mildred Isobel Green (1881–1949) in Bedford in 1910; Green was also a field hockey player and competed as part of the England women's national field hockey team. Together they had five children: Paul Abbott (1914–1940), Mark Rodney (1916–1940), Louis Brabazon (1911–1991), Richard Obre (1912–2003), and Mildred Anne (1917–2003). All four of his sons played for Northamptonshire's county tennis team. Baillon joined the Royal Army Service Corps in 1914, and saw service in France as a lieutenant before leaving the service in 1920. While in the military, he continued to play field hockey.

After World War I, he worked as a manager at Phipps NBC. Later on, he would become the director and eventually the chairman of the company. During World War II, all of his children served in the military. Paul, Mark, and Louis Brabazon joined the Royal Air Force, Richard joined the Army, and Mildren Anne enlisted in the Women's Auxiliary Air Force. Paul and Mark were killed in action during the Battle of Britain.

Baillon died on 2 September 1965 in Brixworth at the age of 84. His sporting memorabilia was subsequently bought by the Friends of the Falkland Islands Museum and the Jane Cameron National Archives in 2017. His Olympic gold medal was donated to Ratcliffe College in England.
