= Colombia Three =

Irish men sentenced to prison in Colombia

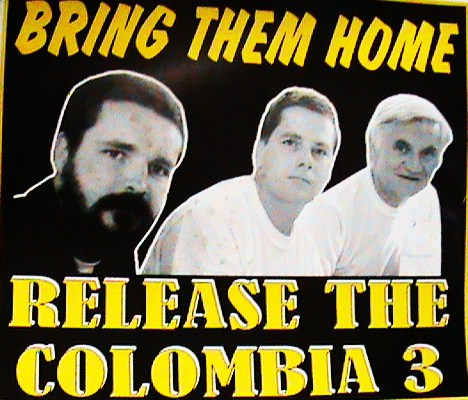
A Sinn Féin poster calling for the men's release

The Colombia Three are three men – Niall Connolly, James Monaghan, and Martin McCauley – who are currently living in the Republic of Ireland, having fled from Colombia where they had been sentenced to prison terms of seventeen years in 2003 on terrorism charges for training FARC rebels. The incident came during a crucial time in the Northern Ireland peace process and risked damaging it. The three were granted amnesty by a Colombian special court in April 2020. On 16 December 2022, the Special Jurisdiction for Peace (JEP) revoked the amnesty, citing that the trio had not fully divulged the truth about their trip to Colombia in 2001.

== Biographies ==
=== James Monaghan ===
James William Monaghan was born on 9 August 1945, and is originally from County Donegal, but his last known address was in Newry, County Down. In the 1970s, he was believed to have been active in the Provisional Irish Republican Army (Provisional IRA), gaining the nickname 'Mortar' on account of his skill in manufacturing homemade mortars and, according to security sources, he was head of the Provisional IRA's engineering section.

Monaghan was arrested on terrorist charges in County Donegal in the 1970s. In 1972, he was arrested in London and given a prison sentence for terrorism offences. In 1976, he escaped from the Special Criminal Court in Dublin following a double bomb blast. He was elected to the Sinn Féin Ard Chomhairle in 1989. According to Alex Maskey, he left Sinn Féin in 1989 or 1990, In 1999, he joined an organisation called Coiste na n-Iarchimí, a Republican ex-prisoners group. He was reported to have been a member of the IRA Army Council.

=== Martin McCauley ===
Martin McCauley was born on 1 December 1962 in County Armagh. He was shot aged 19 in 1982 by the Royal Ulster Constabulary (RUC) in a barn near Lurgan, which resulted in him winning a five-figure sum for damages against the RUC. He was unarmed at the time and another teenager, Michael Tighe was killed. In 1985, he was charged with weapons possession in Northern Ireland and received a two-year suspended sentence. He was a Sinn Féin election worker during assembly elections in the Upper Bann constituency in 1998, but according to Sinn Féin he was not a member of the party. McCauley is regarded as a leading figure in the Provisional IRA's engineering section. On 22 August 2024, McCauley was arrested by Gardai and then remanded in custody on the foot of an extradition warrant issued by British authorities seeking to put McCauley on trial for the deaths of three RUC officers in a land mine explosion near Lurgan in October 1982.

=== Niall Connolly ===
Niall Connolly was born on 5 December 1964 in Glenageary, County Dublin and was educated at Newpark Comprehensive School and Trinity College Dublin. The only one of the three who was a fluent Spanish speaker, he has extensive experience in Latin America, having worked there for a number of years. Prior to his arrest, he was resident in Cuba, where the Cuban authorities claimed he was the Latin America representative for Sinn Féin. This was initially denied by Sinn Féin, but they later accepted that he had been working in Cuba as a part-time party representative. His brother is the journalist Frank Connolly, who was accused under Dáil privilege by Justice Minister Michael McDowell of travelling to Colombia using a false passport with Niall.

== Arrest ==
The three came to prominence on 11 August 2001, when they were arrested travelling on false passports at Bogotá International Airport while waiting to transfer to international flights out of the country. The Colombian authorities alleged at the time that they were training FARC rebels and were members of the Provisional IRA. According to General Fernando Tapias Stahelin, the Colombian authorities were tipped off by "an international security organisation".

Two of the three men, Monaghan and McCauley, had arrived in Colombia on 30 June 2001 on a flight from Belfast via Paris. Niall Connolly had flown from Dublin via Madrid and spent a day in Caracas before making a rendezvous in Bogotá. The three men then spent the next five weeks travelling through a demilitarised southern zone of Colombia, then under the control of the FARC rebels as part of peace talks with the Colombian government. They were arrested as soon as they touched down in Bogotá on a commercial flight on Saturday night.

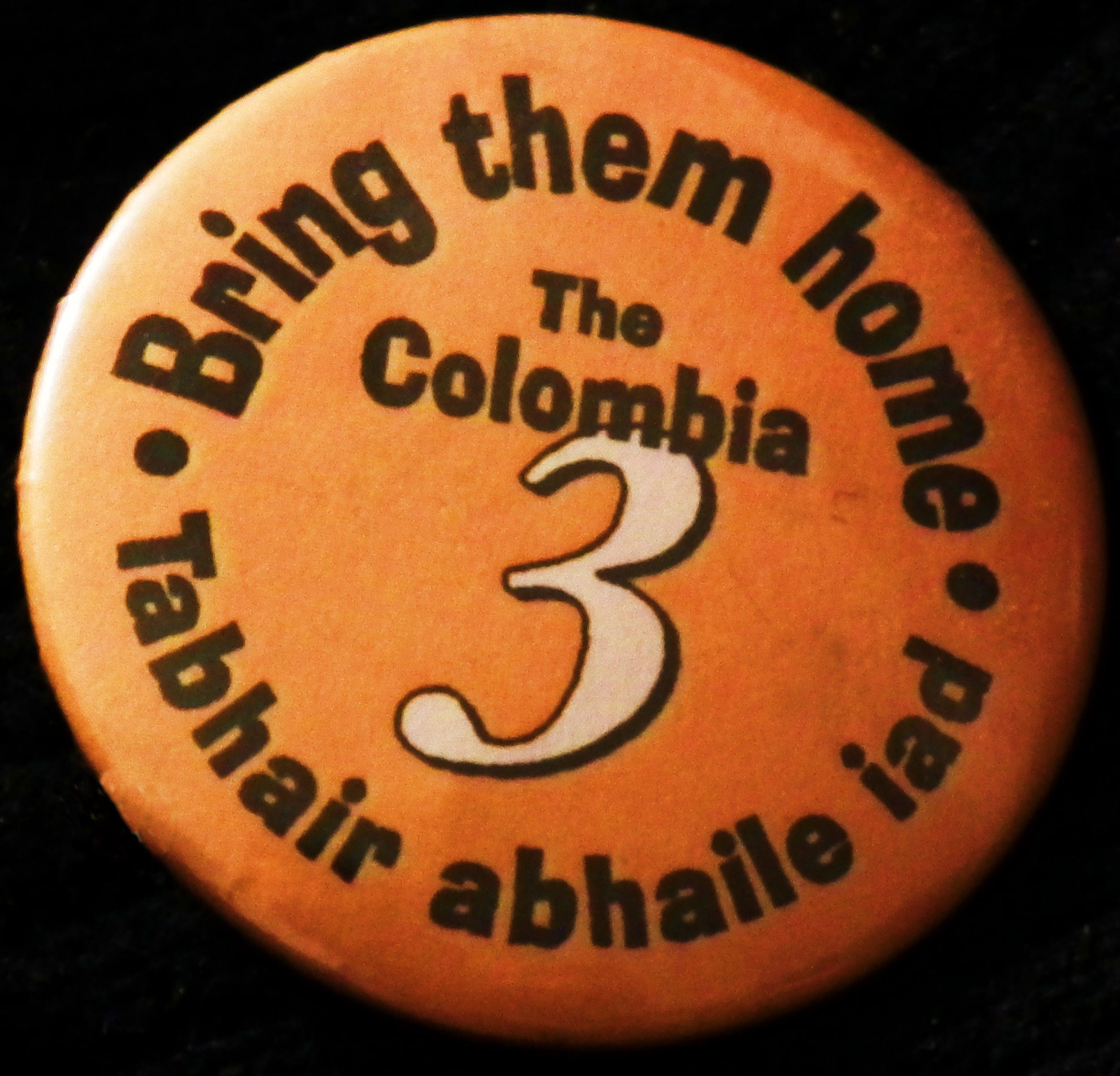
A badge calling for the release of the Colombia Three

== Prosecution and verdict ==
After the men's arrest at Bogota airport, they were only charged with travelling on false passports until 15 February 2002, when they were also charged with training FARC rebels in bomb-making. After a number of delays, including a boycott of proceedings by the three accused, the trial opened on 2 December 2002. Following a number of adjournments, the trial closed on 1 August 2003. The trial judge returned a verdict which found the three men guilty of travelling on false passports and they were given varying sentences of up to 44 months. They were found not guilty on the more serious charges relating to training FARC rebels. The judge ordered their release upon payment of fines equivalent to £3,800.

== Appeal ==
In accordance with Colombian law, the prosecution had the right to appeal the verdict, which it did. While awaiting appeal, the three men were free to leave jail but were instructed by a judge to remain within the country. The appeal court overturned the original trial verdict, and convicted the men of training the rebels, sentencing them to seventeen years in jail on 16 December 2004.

== Return to Ireland ==
The day after their conviction, the Colombian Attorney General announced that the men had fled Colombia. On 5 August 2005, following an interview with Monaghan by RTÉ's Charlie Bird, it emerged that the three men had clandestinely returned to Ireland. The three men were subsequently questioned by Gardaí, but no moves have been taken in relation to extraditing them to Colombia despite the existence of a Colombian arrest warrant, since no extradition treaty or agreement exists between Colombia and Ireland.

== Amnesty ==
The trio were granted amnesty and were cleared of all charges by a Colombian special court on 23 April 2020. The three men had remained at large in Ireland for the duration of their sentence. A Colombian judge, member of Special Jurisdiction for Peace (JEP), said that there was no evidence supporting that "the three had been part of a terrorist group. Moreover, it is clear that none of the crimes for which they were convicted at the time had any victims. For this reason…a full amnesty will be issued."
