= 2015–16 Euro Hockey League =

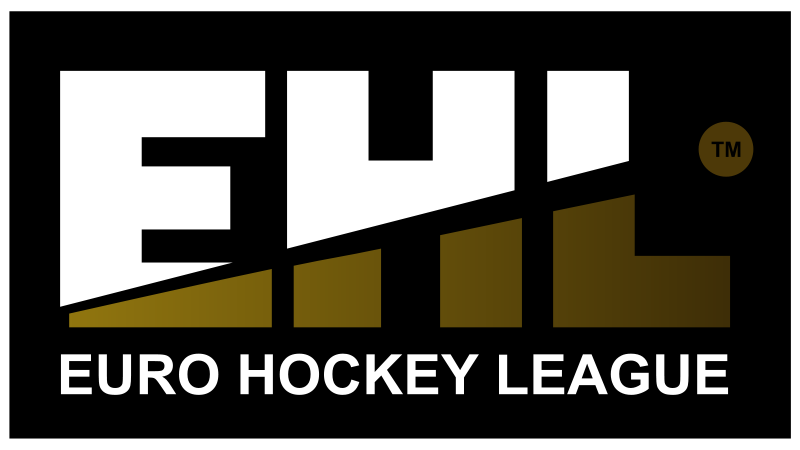

Tournament details
- City: Hamburg; Amstelveen; Barcelona
- Dates: 9 October 2015 – 15 May 2016
- Teams: 24
- Venue: 3 (in 3 host cities)

Final positions
- Champions: (Netherlands) Kampong (1st title)
- Runner-up: (Netherlands) Amsterdam
- Third place: (Germany) Harvestehude

Tournament statistics
- Matches played: 28
- Goals scored: 154 (5.5 per match)
- Top scorer: (Austria) Michael Körper (13 goals)

The Euro Hockey League 2015–16 is the ninth season of the Euro Hockey League, Europe's premier club field hockey tournament. Round One was held in Hamburg, the round of 16 and quarterfinals in Amstelveen and the Final four in Barcelona.

The final was played between Amsterdam and Kampong at the Pau Negre Stadium in Barcelona. Kampong beat Amsterdam 2–0 and won their first Euro Hockey League title.

== Round one ==
Round one was held from 9 until 11 October 2015 in Hamburg, Germany.

=== Pool A ===
Pos	Team	Pld	W	D	L	GF	GA	GD	Pts
1	(Netherlands) Amsterdam	2	2	0	0	23	2	+21	10
2	(France) Saint Germain	2	1	0	1	1	4	–3	5
3	(Poland) Pomarzanin	2	0	0	2	2	20	–18	1

9 October 2015
10:15

Saint Germain (France)	1–0	(Poland) Pomarzanin
J.B. Pauchet 32'	Report

Umpires:
David Sweetman (SCO)
Pietro Galligani (ITA)

10 October 2015
14:45

Amsterdam (Netherlands)	19–2	(Poland) Pomarzanin
Reid-Ross 6', 7', 39'; Pruijser 13', 32', 35', 45'; Bain 15', 17', 21', 33'; Tigges 19', 33' 't Hart 38', 44'; Sweering 41'; Verga 43'; Buissant 51'; Rohof 54'	Report	Kunklewski 23'; Stretovych 36'

Umpires:
Pietro Galligani (ITA)
Daniel Denta (DEN)

11 October 2015
14:00

Amsterdam (Netherlands)	4–0	(France) Saint Germain
't Hart 3', 55'; Verga 34', 45'	Report

Umpires:
Christian Blasch (GER)
Paul Walker (ENG)

=== Pool B ===
Pos	Team	Pld	W	D	L	GF	GA	GD	Pts
1	(Germany) Harvestehude	2	2	0	0	12	2	+10	10
2	(Austria) HC Wien	2	0	1	1	1	6	–5	2
3	(Scotland) Grange	2	0	1	1	1	6	-5	2

9 October 2015
17:00

Harvestehude (Germany)	6–1	(Scotland) Grange
Körper 2', 21'; Creed 25'; Spooner 27', 40'; Willemsen 44'	Report	Harmsworth 53'

Umpires:
Eduardo Lizana (ESP)
Warren McCully (IRL)

10 October 2015
17:00

HC Wien (Austria)	0–0	(Scotland) Grange
	Report

Umpires:
Warren McCully (IRL)
Michael Pontus (BEL)

11 October 2015
16:15

Harvestehude (Germany)	6–1	(Austria) HC Wien
Körper 22', 48', 54', 60'; Hauke 23'; Willemsen 33'	Report	Landsteiner 36'

Umpires:
Eduardo Lizana (ESP)
Michael Pontus (BEL)

=== Pool C ===
Pos	Team	Pld	W	D	L	GF	GA	GD	Pts
1	(Belgium) Royal Léopold	2	2	0	0	12	3	+9	10
2	(Russia) Dinamo Elektrostal	2	1	0	1	6	4	+2	5
3	(Italy) Amsicora	2	0	0	2	4	15	–11	0

9 October 2015
10:15

Dinamo Elektrostal (Russia)	6–1	(Italy) Amsicora
Azarov 15', 16', 28'; A. Kuraev 17', 58'; Mokrousov 41'	Report	Angius 43'

Umpires:
Paul Walker (ENG)
Jasper Nagtzaam (NED)

10 October 2015
10:15

Royal Léopold (Belgium)	9–3	(Italy) Amsicora
Dabanch 7', 18', 25', 36', 53', 56', 57'; S. van Strydonck 39'; Zimmer 50'	Report	Angius 13', 48'; Murgia 54'

Umpires:
Eduardo Lizana (ESP)
Michael Eilmer (AUT)

11 October 2015
9:40

Royal Léopold (Belgium)	3–0	(Russia) Dinamo Elektrostal
Cuvelier 11'; Mazzili 33'; Dabanch 57'	Report

Umpires:
Warren McCully (IRL)
Daniel Denta (DEN)

=== Pool D ===
Pos	Team	Pld	W	D	L	GF	GA	GD	Pts
1	(Spain) Club Egara	2	1	1	0	4	3	+1	7
2	(Ireland) Monkstown	2	0	2	0	4	4	0	4
3	(England) East Grinstead	2	0	1	1	1	2	–1	3

9 October 2015
12:30

Monkstown (Ireland)	1–1	(England) East Grinstead
Good 48'	Report	Faulkner 13'

Umpires:
Christian Blasch (GER)
Michael Eilmer (AUT)

10 October 2015
12:30

Club Egara (Spain)	1–0	(England) East Grinstead
J. Romeu 33'	Report

Umpires:
Christian Blasch (GER)
Jasper Nagtzaam (NED)

11 October 2015
11:45

Club Egara (Spain)	3–3	(Ireland) Monkstown
Mercadé 44'; Tubau 52', 52'	Report	Good 56'; Watkins 59'; Caruth 60'

Umpires:
Michael Eilmer (AUT)
David Sweetman (SCO)

== Knockout stage ==
The round of 16 and the quarter-finals were played in Amstelveen, Netherlands between 25 and 28 March 2016. The semi-finals, third place match and the final were played in Barcelona, Spain on 14 and 15 May 2016.

Round of 16
26 March
(Netherlands) Oranje Zwart	2
(Belgium) Royal Léopold	1
26 March
(Russia) Dinamo Kazan	1
(Germany) Harvestehude	5
26 March
(England) Wimbledon	1
(Netherlands) Amsterdam	3
26 March
(Spain) Real Club de Polo	3
(Spain) Club Egara	0
25 March
(Belgium) Dragons	1 (2)
(Spain) Atlètic Terrassa (p.s.o.)	1 (3)
25 March
(Poland) Grunwald Poznań	2
(Belgium) Leuven	7
25 March
Racing Club de France	1
(Netherlands) Kampong	6
25 March
(Germany) Rot-Weiss Köln	5
(Germany) Hamburg	3

Quarter-finals
28 March
(Netherlands) Oranje Zwart	4 (5)
(Germany) Harvestehude (p.s.o.)	4 (6)
28 March
(Netherlands) Amsterdam	2
(Spain) Real Club de Polo	1
27 March
(Spain) Atlètic Terrassa	3
(Belgium) Leuven	2
27 March
(Netherlands) Kampong	5
(Germany) Rot-Weiss Köln	1

Semi-finals
14 May
(Germany) Harvestehude	2
(Netherlands) Amsterdam	4
14 May
(Spain) Atlètic Terrassa	1
(Netherlands) Kampong	5

Final
15 May
(Netherlands) Amsterdam	0
(Netherlands) Kampong	2
Third place
15 May
(Germany) Harvestehude	3
(Spain) Atlètic Terrassa	2

=== Round of 16 ===
25 March 2016
12:45

Grunwald Poznań (Poland)	2–7	(Belgium) Leuven
Rataj 17'; Dutkiewicz 30'	Report	Garcia 14'; T. Genestet 47'; Deront 49'; T. Willems 53', 56'; Degroote 55'; Bourdeaud'hui 57'

Wagener Stadium, Amstelveen
Umpires:
Pietro Galligani (ITA)
Francisco Vasquez Lopez (ESP)

25 March 2016
15:00

Rot-Weiss Köln (Germany)	5–3	(Germany) Hamburg
Miltkau 5', 32', 46'; Rühr 5'; M. Grambusch 26'	Report	Fuchs 6'; M. Fürste 29'; J. Fürste 34'

Wagener Stadium, Amstelveen
Umpires:
Tim Pullman (AUS)
Nathan Stagno (GIB)

25 March 2016
17:15

Dragons (Belgium)	1–1	(Spain) Atlètic Terrassa
van Aubel 42'	Report	Pujal 60'
Penalties
Denayer (penalty shoot-out scored) van Aubel (penalty shoot-out missed); Rubens (penalty shoot-out scored); A. van Doren (penalty shoot-out missed); Thys (penalty shoot-out missed)	2–3	(penalty shoot-out scored) J. Malgosa; (penalty shoot-out scored) Oliva; (penalty shoot-out scored) Guerrero; (penalty shoot-out missed) Salles

Wagener Stadium, Amstelveen
Umpires:
Marcin Grochal (POL)
David Sweetman (SCO)

25 March 2016
19:30

Racing Club de France	1–6	(Netherlands) Kampong
Domingo-Perez 50'	Report	Kellerman 5'; Caspers 15', 18'; Jonker 10'; Meulenbroek 43'; Havenga 22'

Wagener Stadium, Amstelveen
Umpires:
Ben Göntgen (GER)
Dave Dowdall (ENG)

26 March 2016
10:30

Dinamo Kazan (Russia)	1–5	(Germany) Harvestehude
Yankun 44'	Report	Körper 9', 17'; Heuer 14'; Goodfield 15'; Linsmeier

Wagener Stadium, Amstelveen
Umpires:
Michael Pontus (BEL)
David Sweetman (SCO)

26 March 2016
12:45

Real Club de Polo (Spain)	3–0	(Spain) Club Egara
Alegre 13'; Lleonart 49'; Casasayas 60'	Report

Wagener Stadium, Amstelveen
Umpires:
Coen van Bunge (NED)
Ben Göntgen (GER)

26 March 2016
15:00

Wimbledon (England)	1–3	(Netherlands) Amsterdam
Roper 4'	Report	Pruijser 7', 23', 32'

Wagener Stadium, Amstelveen
Umpires:
Tim Pullman (AUS)
Pietro Galligani (ITA)

26 March 2016
17:15

Oranje Zwart (Netherlands)	2–1	(Belgium) Royal Léopold
van der Weerden 10'; R. van der Horst 58'	Report	A. Verdussen 37'

Wagener Stadium, Amstelveen
Umpires:
Nathan Stagno (GIB)
Dave Dowdall (ENG)

=== Quarter-finals ===
27 March 2016
12:15

Atlètic Terrassa (Spain)	3–2	(Belgium) Leuven
Salles 32'; Oliva 34'; J. Malgosa 57'	Report	Pangrazio 34'; Quemada 46'

Wagener Stadium, Amstelveen
Umpires:
Coen van Bunge (NED)
Nathan Stagno (GIB)

27 March 2016
14:30

Kampong (Netherlands)	5–1	(Germany) Rot-Weiss Köln
Kemperman 22'; Meulenbroek 26'; Havenga 38', 40'; Luijkx 49'	Report	Rühr 32'

Wagener Stadium, Amstelveen
Umpires:
Francisco Vasquez Lopez (ESP)
Marcin Grochal (POL)

28 March 2016
12:15

Oranje Zwart (Netherlands)	4–4	(Germany) Harvestehude
Galema 28', 32' van der Schoot 29'; Stanzl 35'	Report	Körper 18', 42', 49'; Heuer 43'
Penalties
de Voogd (penalty shoot-out missed); R. van der Horst (penalty shoot-out scored); Galema (penalty shoot-out scored); Rizwan (penalty shoot-out missed); Reckers (penalty shoot-out scored) de Voogd (penalty shoot-out scored); R. van der Horst (penalty shoot-out scored); Galema (penalty shoot-out missed)	5–6	(penalty shoot-out missed) Hauke; (penalty shoot-out missed) Körper; (penalty shoot-out scored) Goodfield; (penalty shoot-out scored) Spooner; (penalty shoot-out scored) Pöhling; (penalty shoot-out scored) Hauke; (penalty shoot-out scored) Goodfield; (penalty shoot-out scored) Körper

Wagener Stadium, Amstelveen
Umpires:
Tim Pullman (AUS)
Francisco Vasquez Lopez (ESP)

28 March 2016
14:30

Amsterdam (Netherlands)	2–1	(Spain) Real Club de Polo
Tigges 14'; Verga 18'	Report	Rey 50'

Wagener Stadium, Amstelveen
Umpires:
Marcin Grochal (POL)
Michael Pontus (BEL)

=== Semi-finals ===
14 May 2016
12:00

Harvestehude (Germany)	2–4	(Netherlands) Amsterdam
Mathes 30'; Köhler 36'	Report	Pruijser 10'; Reid-Ross 18'; Tigges 28'; Sweering 55'

Pau Negre Stadium, Barcelona
Umpires:
Marcelo Servetto (ESP)
Nathan Stagno (GIB)

14 May 2016
14:30

Atlètic Terrassa (Spain)	1–5	(Netherlands) Kampong
D. Malgosa 5'	Report	Havenga 4'; Caspers 15'; Kellerman 19'; Meulenbroek 41'; Kempermann 43'

Pau Negre Stadium, Barcelona
Umpires:
Marcin Grochal (POL)
Martin Madden (SCO)

=== Third place ===
15 May 2016
11:30

Harvestehude (Germany)	3 – 2	(Spain) Atlètic Terrassa
Körper 1', 37'; Goodfield 51'	Report	Salles 9'; Oliva 60+'

Pau Negre Stadium, Barcelona
Umpires:
Dan Barstow (ENG)
Martin Madden (SCO)

=== Final ===
15 May 2016
14:00

Amsterdam (Netherlands)	0 – 2	(Netherlands) Kampong
	Report	Caspers 35'; Jonker 59'

Pau Negre Stadium, Barcelona
Umpires:
Marcelo Servetto (ESP)
Marcin Grochal (POL)

== Statistics ==
=== Goalscorers ===
Rank	Player	Team	Goals
1	(Austria) Michael Körper	(Germany) Harvestehude	13
2	(Spain) Gabriel Dabanch	(Belgium) Royal Léopold	8
2	(Netherlands) Mirco Pruijser	(Netherlands) Amsterdam	8
4	(Scotland) Kenny Bain	(Netherlands) Amsterdam	4
4	(Netherlands) Sander 't Hart	(Netherlands) Amsterdam	4
4	(South Africa) Justin Reid-Ross	(Netherlands) Amsterdam	4
4	(Netherlands) Valentin Verga	(Netherlands) Amsterdam	4
4	(Netherlands) Quirijn Caspers	(Netherlands) Kampong	4
4	(Netherlands) Martijn Havenga	(Netherlands) Kampong	4

== See also ==
- 2016 EuroHockey Club Champions Cup (women)
