= Mauricio Galvao =

German field hockey player

Personal information
- Nationality: German
- Born: 21 January 1890 Belgrano, Argentina
- Died: 6 March 1945 (aged 55) Castelnuovo, Italy

Sport
- Sport: Field hockey

Mauricio Galvao (21 January 1890 – 6 March 1945) was a German field hockey player. He competed in the men's tournament at the 1908 Summer Olympics. He was killed in action during World War II.

== Personal life ==
Galvao served as a hauptmann (captain) in the German Army during the Second World War and was killed in action at Castelnuovo on 6 March 1945. He is buried at Zagreb War Cemetery.
