= John Furlong (sports administrator) =

Canadian businessman

John A. F. Furlong OC OBC
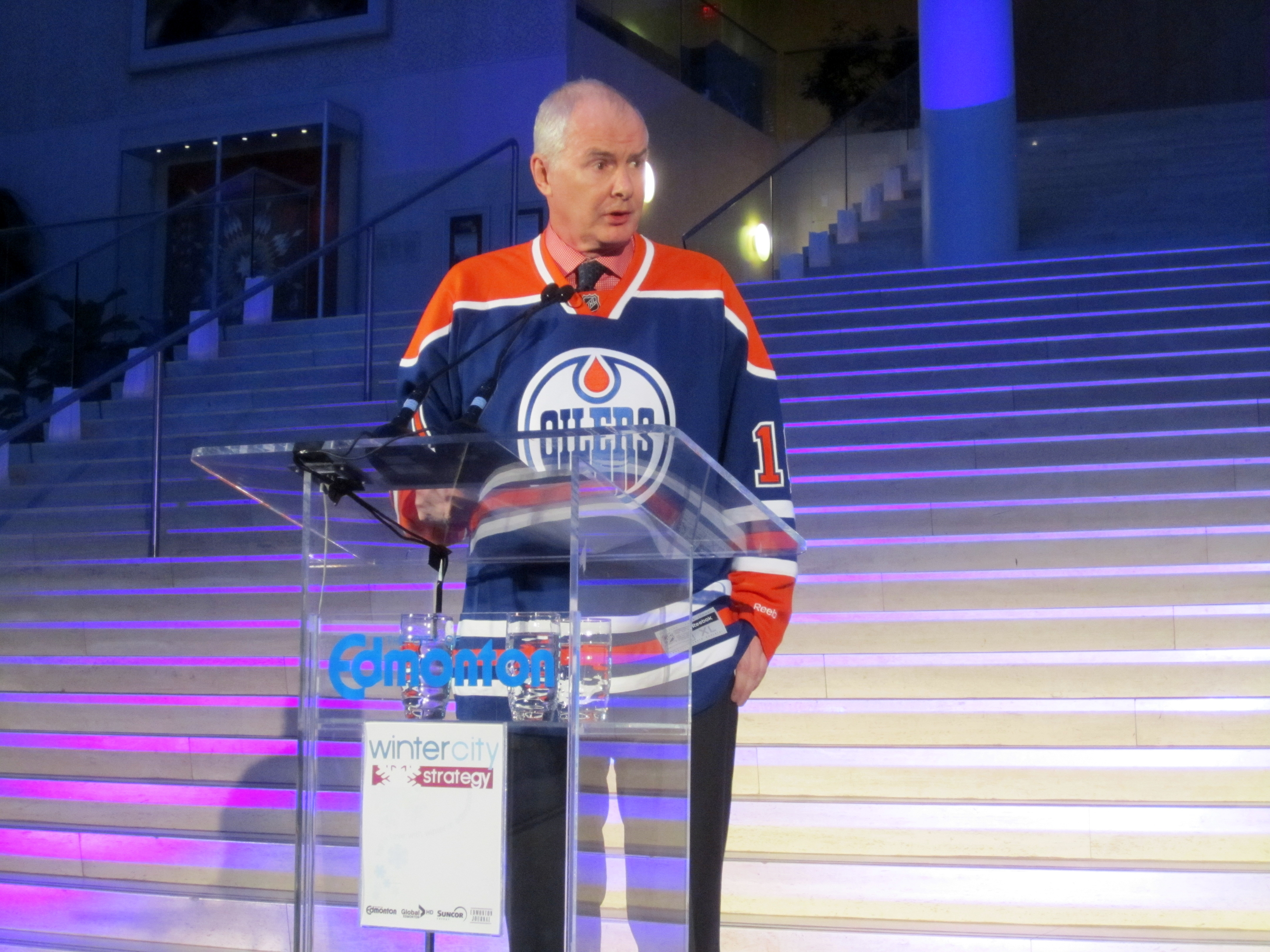

CEO of Vancouver Organizing Committee for the 2010 Olympic and Paralympic Winter Games
- In office February 21, 2004 – February 28, 2010
- IOC President: Jacques Rogge
- Preceded by: Valentino Castellani
- Succeeded by: Dmitry Chernyshenko

Chair of the Vancouver Organizing Committee for the 2010 Olympic and Paralympic Winter Games
- In office February 21, 2004 – June 27, 2014
- Preceded by: Committee establish
- Succeeded by: Position dissolved

Personal details
- Born: October 12, 1950 (age 76) County Tipperary, Ireland
- Spouse(s): Margaret Cook (m. 1970–76); Dayle Turner (1978–82); Gail Robb (m. 1984–2011); Deborah Sharp (m. 2012–her death 2013); Renee Smith-Valade (2013)
- Occupation: Sports administrator
- Website: johnfurlong.ca

John Furlong OC OBC (born October 12, 1950) is a Canadian sports administrator who oversaw the 2010 Winter Olympics and 2010 Winter Paralympics and was President and CEO of the 2010 Vancouver Olympic Organizing Committee (VANOC).

Furlong is chairman of Rocky Mountaineer, corporate director of Canadian Tire, volunteer chair of Own the Podium and a public speaker.

Furlong first visited Canada as a physical education teacher and missionary from 1969 to 1972 at two Catholic day schools in Burns Lake and Prince George in British Columbia. At the conclusion of his teaching term, he returned to Ireland and served as a sports administrator at Newpark Comprehensive School before emigrating to Canada in 1975. He was also president of the Arbutus Club, a member of the Canadian Olympic Committee, and head of the BC Summer Games, BC Winter Games and Sport B.C.

He has cited Canada as being possibly unique in appointing an immigrant to be CEO of their Olympic Games.

His performance and leadership in the Canadian Sport community and specifically in the highly successful staging of the 2010 Olympic and Paralympic Winter Games led to him receiving the Order of Canada and Order of British Columbia as well as numerous honorary degrees.

After the Games, accusations of errors and omissions in his autobiography and abuse allegations were published dating back to his years as a missionary and teacher. Furlong has vehemently denied all the allegations.

== Olympic and Paralympic Games ==
Furlong chaired the Vancouver 2010 Bid Corporation (2001–04) and pitched Vancouver in Prague in its bid to the International Olympic Committee to host the Winter Games.

=== Post-2010 ===
Furlong was chair of Own the Podium, a Canadian not-for-profit organization created several years before the Vancouver 2010 Olympic Games to develop Canada as a world leader in high performance sport. With Own the Podium support Team Canada won a record 26 medals at the Vancouver Olympic Games including an historic 14 gold medals.

Furlong spoke at the World Hockey Summit in 2010, and felt it was important to maintain National Hockey League participation at the Olympics and find a solution to concerns the league had. With respect to the deal arranged for the 2010 Olympics, he stated that "The fans would never forgive you. That's what I think should be driving you to a solution".

In the aftermath of the 2011 Vancouver Stanley Cup riots, at the request of then-Premier Christie Clark, John Furlong and Douglas Keefe provided 53 recommendations in their September 2011 report, The Night the City Became a Stadium: Independent Review of 2011 Vancouver Stanley Cup Playoffs Riot.

Furlong served as advisor to the organizers of the 2015 Canada Winter Games in Prince George, British Columbia.

In July 2016, the Canadian Olympic Committee (COC) announced that Furlong will chair the Special Committee for Home Games (SCHG) to assist Calgary if it decides to bid to host the 2026 Winter Olympics. On November 13, 2018, plebiscite, a majority of Calgary citizens voted against hosting the 2026 Winter Olympics. Within a week of that non-binding plebiscite, Calgary City Council voted to shut down the bid.

In July 2017, Furlong joined the Victoria, British Columbia bid committee for the 2022 Commonwealth Games. In August 2017, Victoria's bid was cancelled after the provincial government declined financial support. In October 2017, Furlong and Victoria bid committee chair David Black attempted to revive Victoria's bid. In an opinion column published by Victoria News, a Black Press news site owned by David Black, Furlong expressed his support for Victoria's bid to host the 2022 Commonwealth Games. There is no evidence that the provincial government reconsidered its decision.

In an April 2021 speech to the Vancouver Board of Trade, Furlong pitched a plan to bring the Winter Olympic Games back to Vancouver in 2030. Furlong claimed that existing facilities would serve as venues, that a wider group of B.C. municipalities would participate, and that the 2030 Games would be fully funded by the private sector. The 2030 Games concept evolved to an Indigenous-led plan (Lil̓wat7úl (Líl̓wat), xʷməθkʷəy̓əm (Musqueam), Skwxwú7mesh (Squamish) and səlilwətaɬ (Tsleil-Waututh) nations) with the Canadian Olympic Committee, the Canadian Paralympic Committee and the municipalities of Vancouver and Whistler. John Furlong was not involved.

On October 27, 2022, the British Columbia government announced it would not support a bid for the 2030 Winter Olympic and Paralympic Games. Concern about Furlong's past was cited as possibly factoring in the failure of his plan.

== Business activities ==
In 2010, Furlong joined the board of Whistler Blackcomb Holdings Inc. With the sale of Whistler Blackcomb Holdings to Vail Resorts in 2016, Furlong's term on the board ended.

In 2016, Furlong and Gareth Rees led Rugby Canada's bid for Vancouver's to host the World Rugby Sevens World Series event. He continues to chair the annual tournament.

Furlong is chairman of Rocky Mountaineer, a rail tourism company based in Vancouver and board member with its owner Armstrong Group Ltd.

Since 2011, Furlong has served as a member of the corporate board of Canadian Tire retailer. He is also board chairman of the Canadian Tire charitable organization, Jumpstart, that funds youth sport called.

As a paid keynote speaker, Furlong is a member of the National Speakers Bureau.

== Controversies ==
John Furlong had been the subject of some controversy following accusations of errors and omissions in his autobiography and legal actions arising from abuse allegations.

=== Biographical inaccuracies and omissions ===
On February 12, 2011, the one-year anniversary of the Olympics, Furlong, with Globe and Mail journalist Gary Mason, published his autobiography Patriot Hearts – Inside the Olympics that Changed a Country. In 2012, several inaccuracies and omissions were uncovered by sports journalist Laura Robinson. Further errors have been uncovered in Patriot Hearts, biographies attached to his speaking engagements and awards, and media interviews.

==== Omissions ====
Missionary years in Northern British Columbia Canada (1969–72)

- Furlong first lived and worked in Canada from 1969 to 1972 as a Frontier Apostle missionary. He later emigrated in 1975, not 1974 as stated in his biography. Furlong had worked (1969–72) at schools in Burns Lake and Prince George, British Columbia.
- The timeline coincides with allegations that he abused First Nations children in Burns Lake (1969–70).
- In June 1972, Furlong returned to Ireland following threats against his life.
- Patriot Hearts co-author Gary Mason stated that Furlong never mentioned his visiting teacher and missionary years in Canada.

Employment at Newpark Comprehensive School and association with George Gibney

- Furlong has never discussed his employment at Newpark Comprehensive School in Dublin Ireland (circa 1972–75). He is listed among Newpark's notable alumni and teachers.
- George Gibney, the disgraced former Irish national swim team coach, also taught at Newpark until 1976. Furlong has said only that he had managed a government sports centre in Ireland.

==== Inaccuracies ====
The 1974 Dublin bombings

- Furlong claimed his father Jack identified the body of his niece Siobhán Roice who was killed in the Dublin bombings. Siobhán's family deny this. Records from the investigation of the bombing identify her father Ned Roice, not Jack Furlong, as attending.
- Johanna Roice, Siobhán's mother, is misnamed Josephine in Patriot Hearts.
- Furlong claims the death of his cousin and his father (June 1974) prompted his emigration to Canada later the same year. In fact, Furlong returned to Canada over a year following these events, in 1975.
- Furlong cites May 14, 1974 as the date of the Dublin bombings. The Dublin bombings occurred on May 17.

Furlong returned to Canada in 1975, not 1974.

- Furlong wrote that he had been a "young teacher with just two years' experience" in 1974 when he accepted a job with Prince George College (a high school). In fact, the year was 1975. He accepted the position with five or more years' combined experience: Immaculata Roman Catholic School and Prince George College (1969–72), and Newpark Comprehensive School (circa 1972–75).
- Furlong wrote that a recruiter visiting Ireland invited him to set up a high school athletic program in Prince George. In fact, Furlong was well known to recruiter Bishop Fergus O'Grady who had previously recruited him as a missionary and volunteer physical education for Immaculata and Prince George College.

==== Furlong has made false claims about his athletic career. ====
- Biographies attached to his speaking engagements and awards such as the Order of British Columbia state that Furlong was the 1986 Canadian Squash Champion. Squash Canada does not recognize Furlong as the 1986 Canadian Squash Champion. Jamie Hickox, not Furlong, won the 1986 Canadian title. Furlong was an age group winner.
- In the lead up to 1978 Northern B.C. Winter Games, Furlong told a reporter he had twice competed in the Olympics. There is no evidence that Furlong appeared as an athlete at any Olympics. Under cross-examination Furlong denied having made this claim.
- In 1975, Furlong stated he had played internationally for Ireland for eight years. This claim is unsupported by a timeline that finds Furlong away from Ireland from age 18 to 20 years (1969–72) and from age 24 (1975–present).

=== Abuse allegations ===
On September 26, 2012, The Georgia Straight published an article that reported allegations that children in the 1970s were physically and mentally abused by Furlong while he was a missionary and physical education teacher at Immaculata Roman Catholic School, a day school, in Burns Lake. The article, by sports journalist Laura Robinson, was supported by over 45 statements, including eight affidavits. Robinson's response to Furlong's defamation action included additional allegations supported by witness statements that he emotionally, physically, and sexually abused his first wife. A statement from his second wife alleged domestic violence.

Abuse allegations against Furlong have never been heard nor accepted as evidence in court. Three former students, whose experiences were not part of the Georgia Straight story, alleged that Furlong sexually, physically, and verbally abused them. In 2013, these three former students filed failed civil lawsuits against Furlong, the Roman Catholic Archdiocese of Vancouver, the Roman Catholic Prince George Diocese, and the Catholic Independent Schools Diocese of Prince George.

Based on changes in information from interviews by the RCMP by one of the accusers, a BC Supreme Court Judge erroneously concluded that the woman had not attended the school where she had accused Furlong of abuse. In fact, the woman had attended the school during Furlong's tenure according to documents presented at a later trial (Robinson v. Furlong). A second woman dropped her civil case after it was deemed unfounded. The third plaintiff, a man, was found to have already received compensation for a claim while attending a different school at the same period as his claim against Furlong. In fact, this man had attended Immaculata during Furlong's tenure.

==== RCMP ====
Questions have been raised about the relationship between Furlong and the Royal Canadian Mounted Police (RCMP) officers who investigated abuse allegations against him. Some of these senior officers had worked closely with Furlong on Olympic security, holding senior or oversight security positions for the 2010 games in Vancouver. These relationships were not revealed and these officers did not recuse themselves from the investigation.

==== Canadian Human Rights Tribunal ====
In a December 2016 complaint to the Canadian Human Rights Tribunal (CHRT), six Northern British Columbia First Nations members formally accused the federal government and the RCMP of racial and ethnic discrimination in their investigation of allegations that John Furlong abused them. When the hearings began in 2023, three of the six complainants and one witness had died.

The inquiry, originally scheduled for January 2022, was delayed after Furlong requested a judicial review of the CHRT's decision to deny him standing to seek a stay or dismissal of the proceedings. In February 2022, the CHRT sealed tribunal evidence to protect Furlong's "dignity and reputation." In November 2022, Furlong's application for judicial review of the CHRT decision was dismissed by a federal court.

The CHRT hearings began May 2023, the first time such hearings were held outside of Ottawa. Testimony included details of abuse by a physical education teacher whose identity was protected by a publication ban.

==== University of British Columbia Fundraiser ====
In January 2017, University of British Columbia (UBC) president Santa J. Ono apologized to Furlong for cancelling his keynote address at the February Canada Millennium Scholarship Foundation fundraising event for athletes. Ono announced that UBC had reversed its decision "because it [was] simply the right thing to do". In response to Furlong's reinstatement as speaker, indigenous professor Daniel Heath Justice quit a UBC committee working on a new sexual assault policy. In a letter to Ono, Heath stated the decision to reinstate Furlong "silenced and erased" abuse allegations against Furlong.

Furlong spoke at the sold-out UBC fundraising breakfast, which raised several hundred thousand dollars for University athletic programs. He donated his five-figure speaking fee to the fundraising effort.

In October 2017, UBC became the subject of a human rights complaint over its handling of Furlong's speech.

==== Defamation lawsuits ====
In November 2012, Furlong filed, but later dropped, defamation suits against the Georgia Straight newspaper and journalist Laura Robinson. Robinson's response to Furlong's defamation action included additional allegations of abuse. Robinson's lawyer accused John Furlong of dropping the suit to avoid public witness testimony. In default judgements, Georgia Straight and Robinson were awarded legal costs.

==== Advocacy ====
There has been ongoing advocacy for investigation into the abuse allegations against John Furlong.

In July 2018 in apparent response to Furlong heading Calgary's 2026 bid exploration committee, the Assembly of First Nations (AFN) passed a resolution calling on chiefs to boycott the bid as a show of support for former residential and day school students.

In July 2016, the Assembly of First Nations (AFN) passed a resolution to pressure the federal government and the RCMP to formally investigate multiple abuse allegations against Furlong.

In January 2016, a complaint to the Canadian Judicial Council (CJC) sought to appeal a judge's decision due to incorrect information. CJC dismissed the complaint.

In a November 2015 open letter, three First Nations hereditary chiefs and five Furlong accusers called on Canadian Prime Minister Justin Trudeau to remove John Furlong from Own the Podium pending a hearing of their claims. Furlong left Own the Podium in July 2018.

== Personal life ==
John Furlong was schooled at St. Vincent's C.B.S., Glasnevin, Dublin.

In 1970, Furlong married Margaret Cook in Burns Lake British Columbia, Canada. Furlong and Cook are parents to four grown children.

In 1979, Furlong lived with Dayle "Dee" Turner in a three-year common law marriage.

In 1984, Furlong married Gail Robb and had one child. The couple divorced in 2011.

In 2012, Furlong and Deborah Sharp were married until her death in a car accident in Ireland in April 2013.

In 2013, Furlong and Renee Smith-Valade became romantic partners. The couple have shared a home since early 2014.

== Awards ==
Ribbon of the Order of British Columbia

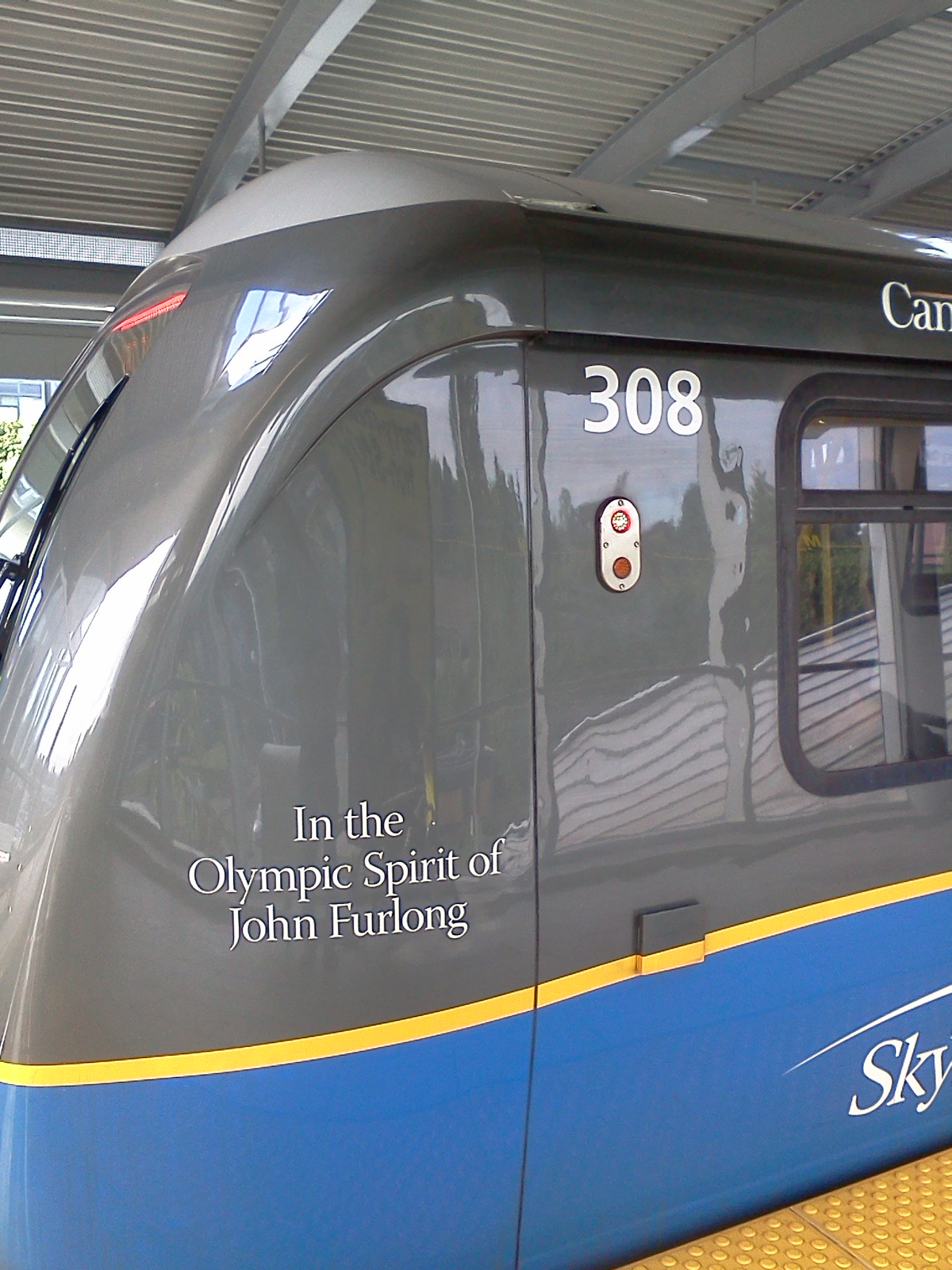
SkyTrain car 308 designated in the Olympic Spirit of John Furlong

- (2009) – BC Sports Hall of Fame Inductee – W.A.C. Bennett Award (2004)
- (2009) – Canada's Most Influential Sport Figure
- (May 6, 2010) – Officer of the Order of Canada
- (2010) – Order of British Columbia
- (2010) – Olympic Order
- (2010) – Paralympic Order
- (2010) – Doctor of Laws (honoris causa), University of British Columbia
- Doctor of Technology (honoris causa), British Columbia Institute of Technology
- (2010) – Doctor of Laws (honoris causa), Justice Institute of British Columbia (2010)
- Doctor of Tourism & Hospitality (honoris causa), Niagara University, New York City
- (2010) – B.C.'s Sportsman of the Decade
- (2010) – 25 Transformational Canadians
- (2010) – Top 25 Canadian Immigrants Award
- (2010) – The Globe & Mail as Canada's Nation Builder
- (2010) – Canada's 2010 Marketer of the year
- (2010) – Sports Media Canada's Sports Executive of the Year
- (2010) – SkyTrain railcar 308 dedicated as "In the Olympic Spirit of John Furlong". It is the first time a SkyTrain railcar has been named after a person.
- (2011) – President's Award from BC Economic Development Association.

== Published works ==
- Furlong, John; Mason, Gary (2011). Patriot Hearts: Inside the Olympics That Changed a Country. Douglas & Mcintyre. ISBN 978-1553657941.

Preceded by (Italy) Valentino Castellani	President of Organizing Committee for Winter Olympic Games; 2010	Succeeded by (Russia) Dmitry Chernyshenko
