= Gary Mason (journalist) =

Canadian journalist

Gary Mason is a Canadian journalist. He currently is the national affairs columnist for The Globe and Mail, and covers events in western Canada from a Vancouverite perspective.

== Biography ==
Mason grew up in Tsawwassen.

Mason graduated from Langara College's journalism program. He started his career with the Victoria Times Colonist before moving to the Vancouver Sun, where he worked for nineteen years as sports section editor and provincial political affairs.

Mason was hired by the Globe as part of an effort to expand the publication to British Columbia readers in 2005; his familiarity to local readers was a factor in his hiring.

== Awards ==
Gary is a five-time National Newspaper Award nominee, winning it three times. He has received B.C.'s highest journalism honour, the Jack Webster Award, eight times. Recently, he was recognized with the Bruce Hutchinson Lifetime Achievement Award. He has authored or co-authored six books. He appears frequently on television and radio to speak about everything from politics to sports. https://www.theglobeandmail.com/authors/gary-mason/

== Books ==
In 1989, Mason and Keith Baldrey authored Fantasyland: Inside the Reign of Bill Vander Zalm.

With his wife, Barbara Gunn, Mason wrote three books about hockey: The Coolest Guys; Guardians: The Secret Life of Goalies; and The Coolest Guys II.

Mason authored Oldtimers: On the Road with the Legendary Heroes of Hockey in 2002.

In 2011, Mason was hired to be the co-author of John Furlong's memoir, Patriot Hearts: Inside the Games that Changed a Country.
