= Bill Haughton =

Personal information
- Full name: William Edward Haughton
- Born: 31 October 1923 Bray, County Wicklow; Ireland
- Died: 11 February 2003 (aged 79) New Lodge, Donnybrook, Dublin; Ireland

Sport
- Sport: Field hockey
- Position: Inside Forward
Senior career
Years	Team	Caps	Goals
1944–1947	Dublin University	-	-
194x–194x	Three Rock Rovers	-	-
194x–196x	→ Leinster	-	-
19xx–19xx	→ Buccaneers	-	-
National team
Years	Team	Caps	Goals
1952–1962	Ireland	29	-

William Edward Haughton, also known as Bill Haughton, was a Ireland men's field hockey international. Between 1952 and 1962 he made 29 senior appearances for Ireland. He captained Ireland 15 times. He also won Irish Senior Cup titles with both Dublin University and Three Rock Rovers. Haughton is also a former Ireland cricket international, making one first-class appearance against Glamorgan in May 1953.

== Early years, family and education ==
Haughton was educated at Friends' School, Lisburn and Trinity College Dublin. In his youth he played both rugby union and association football. He was married to his wife, Dorothy.

== Field hockey ==
=== Domestic teams ===
In 1947 Haughton was a member of the Dublin University team that won the Irish Senior Cup. Haughton's obituary in The Irish Times recalled a story of how he and his Dublin University teammates helped the Ireland national rugby union team defeat England in the 1947 Five Nations Championship. While returning from a tour of Oxford and Cambridge, the Dublin University team shared a ferry with the England team. They persuaded six of the England players to join them at the bar. Haughton claims his "bit of sabotage was fairly well advanced" before an England selector discovered the missing players. The next day Ireland defeated England 22–0. Haughton was also a member of the Three Rock Rovers team that won the Irish Senior Cup in 1953, 1959, 1962. He also represented Leinster at interprovincial level and toured with the Buccaneers.

=== Ireland ===
Between 1952 and 1962 Haughton made 29 senior appearances for Ireland. He captained Ireland on 15 occasions. His brother, Ken, was also an Ireland international. They were Ireland teammates on 10 successive occasions. Haughton would later become an Ireland selector.

== Cricket ==
Bill Haughton
Cricket information
- Batting: Right-handed

Domestic team information
- Years: Team
- 1953: Ireland

Career statistics
Competition	First-class
Matches	1
Runs scored	0
Batting average	0.00
100s/50s	0/0
Top score	0
Catches/stumpings	0/–
- Source: Cricinfo, 8 February 2019

Haughton played as a right-handed batsman and fielder for Dublin University, Clontarf and Pembroke. He also played five times for the Gentlemen of Ireland, including a match at Lord's.

Haughton played once for Ireland, a first-class match against Glamorgan on 23 May 1953. He was dismissed for a duck in both innings.

== Honours ==
=== Field hockey ===
Three Rock Rovers

- Irish Senior Cup
  - Winners: 1953, 1959, 1962: 3

Dublin University

- Irish Senior Cup
  - Winners: 1947: 1
