= Henry Brown (field hockey) =

Irish field hockey player (1887–1961)

Olympic medal record

Men's field hockey

Representing (United Kingdom) Great Britain (Ireland)
Silver medal – second place	1908 London	Team

Henry Joseph Brown (13 March 1887 – 26 February 1961) was an Irish field hockey player who competed in the 1908 Summer Olympics. In 1908 he represented the United Kingdom of Great Britain and Ireland as a member of the Irish national team. He won the silver medal with the team Ireland.
