= Walter Campbell (field hockey) =

Irish field hockey player

Olympic medal record

Men's field hockey

Representing (United Kingdom) Great Britain (Ireland)
Silver medal – second place	1908 London	Team

Walter Islay Hamilton Campbell (14 October 1886 – 11 July 1967), later Verschoyle-Campbell, was an Irish field hockey player who competed in the 1908 Summer Olympics. In 1908, he represented the United Kingdom of Great Britain and Ireland as a member of the Irish national team, winning the silver medal.

He was the son of Rev. Richard Campbell and Lily Verschoyle. He was educated at Marlborough College and Dublin University and later worked as a civil engineer. He married Elizabeth Florence Veda Macpherson, granddaughter of Sir David Lewis Macpherson, in London in 1916.

He served in the First World War with the Royal Engineers.
