= Reggie Pridmore =

English field hockey player and cricketer

Personal information
- Born: 29 April 1886 Edgbaston, England
- Died: 13 March 1918 (aged 31) Piave River, Venezia, Italy

Sport
- Sport: Field hockey
- Position: Inside-left
Senior career
Years	Team	Caps	Goals
1904–1914	Coventry & North Warwicks	-	-
National team
Years	Team	Caps	Goals
1908–1913	England	19	-
Medal record
Men's field hockey
Representing Great Britain
Gold medal – first place	1908 London	Team competition

Reggie Pridmore
Cricket information
- Batting: Right-handed

Career statistics
Competition	First-class
Matches	14
Runs scored	315
Batting average	12.60
100s/50s	0/0
Top score	49
Catches/stumpings	7/–
- Source: Cricinfo, 18 November 2022

Reginald George Pridmore MC (29 April 1886 – 13 March 1918) was a field hockey player, who won the gold medal with the England team at the 1908 Summer Olympics in London.

== Biography ==
Pridmore was educated at Elstow School, Elstow and Bedford Grammar School. He played club hockey for Coventry & North Warwicks Hockey Club.

At the 1908 Olympic Games, Pridmore set an Olympic record for most goals scored by an individual in an Olympic final in men's field hockey with his 4 goals in England's 8–1 victory. This record stood till the 1952 Helsinki Olympics, where India's Balbir Singh Sr. scored 5 goals in India's 6–1 victory over the Netherlands.

Pridmore was also a cricketer, and played first-class cricket as a right-hand batsman for Warwickshire. He was a stockbroker by trade.

Pridmore, was killed in action, aged 31, during the First World War, serving as a major with the Royal Field Artillery near the Piave River in Italy. He was buried at the Giavera British Cemetery nearby.

== See also ==
- List of Olympians killed in World War I
