= Field hockey at the 1908 Summer Olympics =

Coordinates: 51.5136°N 0.2274°E

Field hockey at the Games of the IV Olympiad
- Venue: White City Stadium
- Dates: 29–31 October 1908
- Teams: 6

Medalists
| 1st place, gold medalist(s) | | England | Great Britain |
| 2nd place, silver medalist(s) | | Ireland | Great Britain |
| 3rd place, bronze medalist(s) | | Scotland | Great Britain |
| 3rd place, bronze medalist(s) | | Wales | Great Britain |

At the 1908 Summer Olympics, a field hockey tournament was contested for the first time. Six teams entered the tournament: England, Ireland, Scotland, Wales, Germany and France. England won the gold medal, Ireland the silver and Scotland and Wales were awarded bronze medals. All the medals were subsequently credited to Great Britain.

== Squads ==
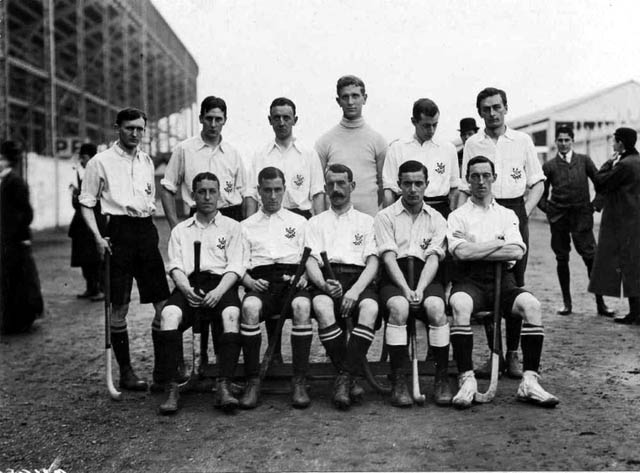
England team, Gold Medal

France
- R. P. Aublin
- David Baidet
- Raoul Benoist
- André Bounal
- Louis Gautier
- Daniel Girard
- Charles Pattin
- Louis Poupon
- Frédéric Roux
- René Salarnier (GK)
- Louis Saulnier
- Fernand Versini
Germany
- Alfons Brehm
- Elard Dauelsberg
- Franz Diederichsen
- Carl Ebert (GK)
- Jules Fehr
- Mauricio Galvao
- Raulino Galvao
- Fritz Möding
- Friedrich Wilhelm Rahe
- Albert Stüdemann
- Friedrich Uhl

=== Great Britain ===
England
- Louis Baillon
- Harry Freeman
- Eric Green
- Gerald Logan
- Alan Noble
- Edgar Page
- Reggie Pridmore
- Percy Rees
- John Yate Robinson
- Stanley Shoveller
- Harvey Wood (GK)
Ireland
- Edward Allman-Smith
- Henry Brown
- Walter Campbell
- William Graham
- Richard Gregg
- Edward Holmes (GK)
- Robert Kennedy
- Henry Murphy
- Jack Peterson
- Walter Peterson
- Charles Power
- Franks Robinson
Scotland
- Alexander Burt
- John Burt (GK)
- Alastair Denniston
- Charles Foulkes
- Hew Fraser
- James Harper-Orr
- Ivan Laing
- Hugh Neilson
- Gordon Orchardson
- Norman Stevenson
- Hugh Walker
Wales
- Frank Connah
- Llewellyn Evans
- Arthur Law
- Robert Lyne
- Wilfred Pallott
- Frederick Phillips
- Edwin Richards
- Charles Shephard
- Bertrand Turnbull (GK)
- Philip Turnbull
- James Williams

== Results ==
=== Bracket ===
First Round
29 October
England | 10
France | 1
29 October
Scotland | 4
Germany | 0

Semi-finals
30 October
England | 6
Scotland | 1
30 October
Ireland | 3
Wales | 1

Final
31 October
England | 8
Ireland | 1

=== First round ===
29 October 1908
13:45

| Scotland | 4–0 | Germany |
|---|---|---|
| Laing 5'; Burt 32' ^{2} Walker 67' | Report |

Umpires:
E. Fletcher (GBR)
J. Kirkwood (GBR)

29 October 1908
15:00

| England | 10–1 | France |
|---|---|---|
| Pridmore 15' ^{3} Rees ^{1} Logan ^{2} Shoveller ^{3} Green ^{1} | Report | Poupon ^{1} |

Umpires:
Edward Denny (GBR)
Thomas Burman (GBR)

=== Semi-finals ===
There were no playoffs for third place, so the losers of the semi-finals received bronze medals.

30 October 1908
13:45

| Ireland | 3–1 | Wales |
|---|---|---|
| Robinson ^{1} Gregg ^{1} Power ^{1} | Report | Williams 4' |

Umpires:
George Lings (GBR)
H. Greening (GBR)

30 October 1908
15:00

| England | 6–1 | Scotland |
|---|---|---|
| Pridmore 15', 37' ^{3} Shoveller ^{2} Logan ^{1} | Report | Walker ^{1} |

Umpires:
Henry Tennent (GBR)
E. Wilson (GBR)

=== Extra match ===
A match between the two continental teams took place between the semifinals and the final.

Given both France and Germany had lost in the first round, this extra match was a de facto fifth and sixth place playoff match, though the official report makes no mention of this.

30 October 1908

| Germany | 1–0 | France |
|---|---|---|
| Möding 25' | Report |

=== Final ===
The official report ceases its description of the game after England took the lead 5–1, saying only that "by this time England had taken control of the game and won with eight goals to one".

31 October 1908
15:00

| England | 8–1 | Ireland |
|---|---|---|
| Logan ^{2} Pridmore 20', 40' ^{4} Shoveller ^{2} | Report | Robinson 36' |

Umpires:
M. Baker (GBR)
G. Morton (GBR)

== Final standings ==
1. England
2. Ireland
3. Scotland & Wales
4. no placing
5. Germany
6. France

== Sources ==
- Cook, Theodore Andrea (1908). The Fourth Olympiad, Being the Official Report. London: British Olympic Association.
- De Wael, Herman (2002). "Hockey 1908". Herman's Full Olympians.
