= Newpark Comprehensive School =

Mixed second-level State school in Blackrock, Dublin, Ireland

- Scoil Chuimsitheach na Páirce Nua

Location
- Newtown Park Avenue; Blackrock, County Dublin, A94 EV70; Ireland; 53.2897°N 6.1731°W

Information
- Type: Voluntary
- Religious affiliation: Church of Ireland
- Established: 1972
- Principal: Eoin Norton
- Gender: Co-educational
- Age: 12 to 18
- Enrolment: approx. 860 (2019)
- Website: www.newparkschool.ie

Newpark Comprehensive School (Irish: Scoil Chuimsitheach na Páirce Nua) is a co-educational Church of Ireland secondary school, in Blackrock, County Dublin, Ireland. Established in 1972, there are approximately 860 pupils enrolled in the school.

== Governance ==
Newpark has a Protestant tradition, and is under the patronage of the Church of Ireland Archbishop of Dublin.

== History ==
Lunchtime in Newpark in 2006, in front of the former main block (now demolished).

=== Avoca school and Kingstown grammar school ===
Avoca School in Blackrock was founded in 1892 by Albert Augustus "A.A." MacDonagh M.A. (1869-1934) who served for a long time as its headmaster, and Kingstown Grammar School in 1894 by Matthew Edward Devlin (whose son Rev. John Edward Devlin took over as Kingstown's headmaster in 1932).

The two founding schools catered primarily for Protestant children in the Blackrock and Dún Laoghaire areas, but the schools also welcomed pupils from other religious faiths, and from none. In 1968 the original schools amalgamated as Avoca & Kingstown School at Newtownpark Avenue.

=== Newpark Comprehensive School ===
The current school was created in 1972, when the Department of Education purchased Avoca & Kingstown School. It was one of the four Comprehensive Schools established by the Government to make free second-level education accessible to the Protestant community within an appropriate ethos.

Newpark has a specific obligation to the Protestant community of south Dublin/north Wicklow, and this is reflected in its special recognition of the National Schools under Protestant management in the catchment area and by the priority given to those enrolling from the Protestant community. Newpark also considers itself a pluralist community; it embraces inclusion in terms of social, cultural, religious and ethnic diversity.

== Sport and extracurricular activities ==
The school offers a range of sports including field hockey, rugby and basketball. Its rugby senior team has held the McMullen Cup since 2007. Avoca Hockey Club is based on the campus.The students also have access to Newpark Sports Centre which has a sports hall and a swimming pool.

== Campus ==
The Newpark campus covers 100,543m² (25 acres). The school was centred on a purpose-built prefab-style block, opened in 1974, but also used two large houses, "Melfield" and "Belfort" (Referred to as the Red-Brick by students), a purpose-built extension to Belfort (The D/F Building), a gate lodge and other ancillary rooms.. In 2015 a new school building was opened to students and many of the ancillary rooms were demolished leaving only Belfort and Melfield standing from the original plan.

=== Facilities ===
==== Newpark Academy of Music ====
Founded in 1978 to provide music school facilities in south Dublin, Newpark Academy of Music, formerly Newpark Music Centre, now caters for over 1000 students and is one of the largest public music schools in Dublin. While the emphasis is on learning music for enjoyment, students and choirs from the Academy have been successful in competitions throughout the country.

As a founder member of the International Association of Schools of Jazz (IASJ), Newpark Academy of Music established its Jazz and Contemporary Music Department in 1986 and is now recognised as the primary centre for jazz and jazz related music education in the country.

==== Newpark Sports Centre ====
Newpark Sports Centre was built in 1973 with the sole purpose of providing a modern Physical Education facility for the school. Since then, the centre has developed into a multi-purpose facility providing a range of activities for the local community. Its sports facilities include:

- Water-based artificial grass hockey pitch
- Basketball courts
- 25m swimming pool
- Health suite
- Fitness centre
- Multi-use sports hall
- 500m running track
- Rugby pitches (off school grounds)

=== Newpark Adult Education Centre ===
Newpark Adult Education Centre offers evening and night classes in a wide range of subjects for leisure and personal development.

== Notable alumni and teachers ==
- Chris Andrews, politician
- Sir Hugh Annesley, Chief Constable of the Royal Ulster Constabulary (RUC) 1989-1996 (he had attended Avoca School)
- Jonathan Philbin Bowman, broadcaster
- Niall Connolly, Sinn Féin activist; one of the "Colombia Three"
- John de Courcy Ireland, historian and political activist
- John A. Furlong, CEO of the 2010 Vancouver Olympic Organizing Committee
- George Gibney, disgraced national and Olympic coach (1984-1991)
- Niamh Hyland, Supreme Court Judge
- Bryan Dobson, RTÉ News
- Fergus Johnston, composer and member of Aosdána
- Rachel Joynt, visual artist / sculptor
- Wilfrid Brambell, actor
- Riyadh Khalaf, broadcaster, writer, and YouTuber
- David McCullagh, RTÉ journalist and author
- Paul Readman, Professor in Modern British History at King's College London
- Peter Pearson (painter, born 1955)
- Mario Rosenstock, actor and comedian
- Dan Sheridan, actor
- Louis Leonowens, businessman who operated in Siam
- Karl Geary, actor, author
