= Charles Power (field hockey) =

Irish field hockey player

Olympic medal record

Men's field hockey

Representing (United Kingdom) Great Britain (Ireland)
Silver medal – second place	1908 London	Team

Charles Frederick Power (26 August 1878 – 26 March 1953) was an Irish field hockey player who competed in the 1908 Summer Olympics. In 1908 he represented the United Kingdom of Great Britain and Ireland as a member of the Irish national team, which won the silver medal.
