= 2019 Women's FIH Pro League squads =

This article lists the squads of all participating teams in the 2019 Women's FIH Pro League. The nine national teams involved in the tournament were required to register a squad of up to 32 players.

== Argentina ==
The following 32 players appeared in the Argentina squad for the 2019 FIH Pro League.

Head coach: Carlos Retegui

The following 18 players represented the team during the Grand Final:

1. Belén Succi (GK)
2. Sofía Toccalino
4. Rosario Luchetti (C)
5. Agostina Alonso
11. Carla Rebecchi
13. Cristina Cosentino (GK)
15. María José Granatto
16. Florencia Habif
18. Victoria Sauze
19. Agustina Albertario
20. Lucina von der Heyde
21. Victoria Granatto
22. Eugenia Trinchinetti
23. Micaela Retegui
24. Celina di Santo
25. Silvina D'Elía
28. Julieta Jankunas
32. Valentina Costa Biondi

The remainder of the squad is as follows:

3. Victoria Zuloaga
6. Bianca Donati
9. Priscila Jardel
10. Magdalena Fernández Ladra
12. Delfina Merino
14. Agustina Habif
17. Rocío Sánchez
26. Paula Ortíz
27. Noel Barrionuevo
29. Victoria Miranda
30. Agostina Ayala
31. Florencia Mutio
33. Milagros Fernández Ladra
99. Agustina Gorzelany

== Australia ==
The following 30 players appeared in the Australia squad for the 2019 FIH Pro League.

Head coach: Paul Gaudoin

The following 18 players represented the team during the Grand Final:

1. Sophie Taylor
2. Ambrosia Malone
3. Brooke Peris
7. Jodie Kenny (C)
9. Lily Brazel
10. Madison Fitzpatrick
13. Edwina Bone
15. Kaitlin Nobbs
17. Georgina Morgan (C)
18. Jane Claxton
19. Jocelyn Bartram (GK)
21. Renee Taylor
23. Kalindi Commerford
24. Mariah Williams
26. Emily Chalker (C)
27. Rachael Lynch
30. Grace Stewart
32. Savannah Fitzpatrick

The remainder of the squad is as follows:

5. Ashlee Wells (GK)
6. Penny Squibb
8. Georgia Wilson
11. Karri McMahon
12. Greta Hayes
14. Stephanie Kershaw
28. Kristina Bates
29. Rebecca Greiner
31. Hayley Padget
33. Amy Lawton
35. Michaela Spano
36. Kate Jenner

== Belgium ==
The following 25 players appeared in the Belgium squad for the 2019 FIH Pro League.

Head coach: Niels Thiessen

2. Sophie Limauge
4. Aline Fobe
6. Anouk Raes (C)
7. Judith Vandermeiren
8. Emma Puvrez
9. Mathilde Raymakers
10. Louise Versavel
11. Joanne Peeters
13. Alix Gerniers
14. Emilie Sinia
15. Anne-Sophie Weyns
16. Tiphaine Duquesne
17. Michelle Struijk
19. Barbara Nelen (C)
21. Aisling D'Hooghe (GK)
22. Stéphanie Vanden Borre
23. Elena Sotgiu (GK)
25. Pauline Leclef
26. Lien Hillewaert
27. Jill Boon
29. Elodie Picard (GK)
30. Ambre Ballenghien
31. Lucie Breyne
32. Charlotte Englebert
33. Alexia 't Serstevens

== China ==
The following 28 players appeared in the China squad for the 2019 FIH Pro League.

Head coach: Huang Yongsheng

1. Li Dongxiao
2. Gu Bingfeng
3. Song Xiaoming
5. Li Jiaqi
6. Tang Wanli
7. Cui Qiuxia (C)
8. Sun Xiao
9. Xu Wenyu
10. Peng Yang (C)
11. Liang Meiyu
12. Guo Qiu
13. Li Hong
15. Zhang Jinrong
16. Ou Zixia
17. Yong Jing
18. Zhang Xindan
19. Zhang Xiaoxue
20. He Jiangxin
21. Zhong Mengling
22. Liu Ping (GK)
23. De Jiaojiao
25. Xi Xiayun
27. Cai Zhangying
28. Wang Na
29. Chen Yi
30. Dan Wen
31. Zhong Jiaqi
32. Ye Jiao (GK)

== Germany ==
The following 28 players appeared in the Germany squad for the 2019 FIH Pro League.

Head coach: (Belgium) Xavier Reckinger

The following 18 players represented the team during the Grand Final:

2. Kira Horn
3. Amelie Wortmann
5. Selin Oruz
6. Hannah Gablać
8. Anne Schröder
9. Elisa Gräve
10. Nina Notman
11. Lena Micheel
14. Janne Müller-Wieland (C)
15. Nathalie Kubalski (GK)
16. Sonja Zimmermann
20. Julia Sonntag (GK)
21. Franzisca Hauke
22. Cécile Pieper
24. Pia Maertens
25. Viktoria Huse
28. Rebecca Grote
30. Hanna Granitzki

The remainder of the squad is as follows:

1. Noelle Rother (GK)
4. Nike Lorenz
12. Charlotte Stapenhorst
13. Teresa Martin-Pelegrina
19. Maike Schaunig
26. Alisa Vivot
27. Naomi Heyn
29. Emma Boermans
31. Nele Aring
32. Nicola Pluta

== Great Britain ==
The following 31 players appeared in the Great Britain squad for the 2019 FIH Pro League.

Head coach: (Australia) Mark Hager

1. Maddie Hinch (GK)
2. Alex Malzer
3. Amy Tennant (GK)
4. Laura Unsworth
5. Sarah Evans
6. Anna Toman
7. Hannah Martin
8. Holly Hunt
9. Susannah Townsend
10. Sarah Robertson
11. Suzy Petty
12. Erica Sanders
13. Elena Rayer
14. Tessa Howard
16. Emily Defroand
17. Sarah Jones
18. Giselle Ansley
19. Sophie Bray
20. Hollie Pearne-Webb (C)
21. Holly Munro
22. Elizabeth Neal
23. Nicola Cochrane (GK)
24. Shona McCallin
25. Sabbie Heesh (GK)
26. Lily Owsley
27. Jo Hunter
29. Esme Burge
30. Eloise Stenner
31. Grace Balsdon
32. Amy Costello
33. Isabelle Petter

== Netherlands ==
The following 33 players appeared in the Netherlands squad for the 2019 FIH Pro League.

Head coach: (Australia) Alyson Annan

The following 18 players represented the team during the Grand Final:

1. Anne Veenendaal (GK)
3. Sanne Koolen
5. Malou Pheninckx
6. Laurien Leurink
7. Xan de Waard
8. Marloes Keetels
10. Kelly Jonker
11. Maria Verschoor
12. Lidewij Welten
13. Caia van Maasakker
15. Frédérique Matla
17. Ireen van den Assem
19. Marijn Veen
20. Laura Nunnink
21. Lauren Stam
22. Josine Koning (GK)
23. Margot van Geffen
24. Eva de Goede (C)

The remainder of the squad is as follows:

2. Renée van Laarhoven
4. Lieke Hulsen
16. Ginella Zerbo
18. Pien Sanders
25. Kyra Fortuin
26. Famke Richardson
27. Yibbi Jansen
28. Margot Zuidhof
29. Maartje Krekelaar
30. Kiki Gunneman (GK)
31. Freeke Moes
32. Alexandra Heerbaart (GK)
33. Lisa Post
34. Hester van der Veld
35. Felice Albers

== New Zealand ==
The following 30 players appeared in the New Zealand squad for the 2019 FIH Pro League.

Head coach: (Republic of Ireland) Graham Shaw

1. Tarryn Davey
2. Olivia Shannon
3. Leah Butt
4. Olivia Merry
5. Frances Davies
6. Amy Robinson
7. Kate Ivory
8. Sally Rutherford (GK)
9. Brooke Neal
10. Brooke Roberts (GK)
11. Kaitlin Cotter
12. Ella Gunson
13. Samantha Charlton
15. Grace O'Hanlon (GK)
16. Elizabeth Thompson
17. Stephanie Dickins
18. Kirsten Pearce
19. Tessa Jopp
20. Megan Hull
21. Alia Jaques
22. Katie Doar
23. Deanna Ritchie
24. Rose Keddell
25. Kelsey Smith
27. Holly Pearson
28. Shiloh Gloyn
29. Madison Doar
30. Louisa Tuilotolava
31. Stacey Michelsen (C)
32. Madeleine Williamson (GK)

== United States ==
The following 29 players appeared in the United States squad for the 2019 FIH Pro League.

Head coach: (Netherlands) Janneke Schopman

1. Erin Matson
2. Lauren Moyer
3. Jessica Jecko (GK)
4. Danielle Grega
5. Casey Umstead
6. Virginia Bramley
7. Catherine Caro
8. Alyssa Parker
10. Jill Funk
11. Taylor West
12. Amanda Magadan
13. Ashley Hoffman
14. Julia Young
15. Corinne Zanolli
16. Linnea Gonzales
17. Anna Dessoye
18. Mary Barham
19. Kelly Marks
20. Ali Froede
21. Alexandra Hammel
22. Nicole Woods
23. Mackenzie Allessie
24. Kathleen Sharkey (C)
26. Margaux Paolino
27. Laura Hurff
28. Caitlin van Sickle
29. Alyssa Manley
30. Kealsie Robles (GK)
31. Kelsey Bing (GK)
