= 2019–21 Women's Feldhockey-Bundesliga =

Bundesliga
- Season: 2019–2021
- Dates: 7 September 2019 – 9 May 2021
- Champions: Düsseldorfer HC (1st title)
- Regular season: Düsseldorfer HC
- Relegated: Rüsselsheimer RK; Zehlendorfer Wespen
- Euro Hockey League: Düsseldorfer HC
- Matches: 180
- Goals: 631 (3.51 per match)
- Top goalscorer: Lena Micheel (23 goals)
- Biggest home win: Club an der Alster 9–0 Zehlen Wespen; Hamburg 9–0 Uhlenhorst Mülheim
- Biggest away win: Uhlenhorst Mülheim 0–7 Hamburg; Zehlen Wespen 0–7 Düsseldorfer HC

The 2019–21 Bundesliga was the 75th season of the Bundesliga, Germany's premier field hockey league. It began on 7 September 2019 and it concluded with the championship final on 9 May 2021 in Mannheim. Due to the COVID-19 pandemic the league was suspended on 13 March until 1 April 2020. The season returned on 5 September 2020 and was extended into 2021 with an extra round of matches.

For the 2019–21 season, the German Hockey Federation introduced a new format. The league was played by twelve teams grouped in two pools of six (Pool A and Pool B) based on the previous season's ranking. The teams of the same pool competed 2 times and faced the teams of the other pool once. The first four of each pool qualified for the play-offs and the last two of each pool played the play-downs.

Club an der Alster were the two-time defending champions.

== Teams ==
2019–2021 Feldhockey-Bundesliga teams
Location of Hamburg teams

A total of 12 teams participated in the 2019–2021 edition of the Bundesliga. The promoted teams were Großflottbek and Rüsselsheimer who replaced TSV Mannheim and Bremer HC.

Team	Location	State
Berliner HC	Berlin	Berlin
Club an der Alster	Hamburg	Hamburg
Düsseldorfer HC	Düsseldorf	North Rhine-Westphalia
Grossflottbeker THGC	Hamburg	Hamburg
Harvestehuder THC	Hamburg	Hamburg
UHC Hamburg	Hamburg	Hamburg
Mannheimer HC	Mannheim	Baden-Württemberg
Münchner SC	Munich	Bavaria
Rot-Weiss Köln	Cologne	North Rhine-Westphalia
Rüsselsheimer RK	Rüsselsheim	Hesse
Uhlenhorst Mülheim	Mülheim	North Rhine-Westphalia
Zehlendorfer Wespen	Berlin	Berlin

=== Number of teams by state ===
State	Number of teams	Clubs
Hamburg	4	Club an der Alster, Großflottbek, Harvestehuder THC and UHC Hamburg
North Rhine-Westphalia	3	Düsseldorfer HC, Rot-Weiss Köln and Uhlenhorst Mülheim
Berlin	2	Berliner HC and Zehlendorfer Wespen
Baden-Württemberg	1	Mannheimer HC
Bavaria	1	Münchner SC
Hesse	1	Rüsselsheimer RK
Total	12	

== Regular season ==
=== Pool A ===
Pos	Team	Pld	W	D	L	GF	GA	GD	Pts	Qualification
1	Mannheimer HC	27	19	4	4	45	19	+26	61	Qualified to Play–offs
2	Club an der Alster	27	20	1	6	80	31	+49	58	Qualified to Play–offs
3	Rot-Weiss Köln	27	18	3	6	69	35	+34	57	Qualified to Play–offs
4	Harvestehuder THC	27	9	8	10	42	44	−2	35	Qualified to Play–offs
5	Münchner SC	27	4	7	16	23	54	−31	19	Advance to Play–downs
6	Grossflottbeker THGC	27	2	4	21	25	55	−30	10	Advance to Play–downs

Source: Deutscher Hockey-Bund
Rules for classification: 1) Points; 2) Goal difference; 3) Goals scored; 4) Games won; 5) Head-to-head.

=== Pool B ===
Pos	Team	Pld	W	D	L	GF	GA	GD	Pts	Qualification
1	Düsseldorfer HC	27	20	4	3	77	24	+53	64	Qualified to Play–offs
2	UHC Hamburg	27	19	3	5	80	29	+51	60	Qualified to Play–offs
3	Berliner HC	27	9	5	13	30	40	−10	32	Qualified to Play–offs
4	Uhlenhorst Mülheim	27	9	5	13	35	59	−24	32	Qualified to Play–offs
5	Rüsselsheimer RK	27	6	4	17	45	71	−26	22	Advance to Play–downs
6	Zehlendorfer Wespen	27	1	4	22	19	109	−90	7	Advance to Play–downs

Source: Deutscher Hockey-Bund
Rules for classification: 1) Points; 2) Goal difference; 3) Goals scored; 4) Games won; 5) Head-to-head.

=== Overall table ===
Pos	Team	Pld	W	D	L	GF	GA	GD	Pts	Qualification
1	Düsseldorfer HC	27	20	4	3	77	24	+53	64	Qualified to 2022 Euro Hockey League
2	Mannheimer HC	27	19	4	4	45	19	+26	61	
3	UHC Hamburg	27	19	3	5	80	29	+51	60	
4	Club an der Alster	27	20	1	6	80	31	+49	58	
5	Rot-Weiss Köln	27	18	3	6	69	35	+34	57	
6	Harvestehuder THC	27	9	8	10	42	44	−2	35	
7	Berliner HC	27	9	5	13	30	40	−10	32	
8	Uhlenhorst Mülheim	27	9	5	13	35	59	−24	32	
9	Rüsselsheimer RK	27	6	4	17	45	71	−26	22	
10	Münchner SC	27	4	7	16	23	54	−31	19	
11	Grossflottbeker THGC	27	2	4	21	25	55	−30	10	
12	Zehlendorfer Wespen	27	1	4	22	19	109	−90	7	

Source: Deutscher Hockey-Bund
Rules for classification: 1) Points; 2) Goal difference; 3) Goals scored; 4) Games won; 5) Head-to-head.

== Play–downs ==
The play-downs were played in a best of three format with the first match hosted by the weaker-placed team on 24 or 25 April and the return match and potential third decisive match hosted by the better placed team on 1 and 2 May respectively.

Team 1	Series	Team 2	Game 1	Game 2	Game 3
Rüsselsheimer RK	1–2	Grossflottbeker THGC	2–0	2–2 (3–4 pen.)	1–1 (2–4 pen.)
Münchner SC	2–0	Zehlendorfer Wespen	2–1	3–0	

24 April 2021
11:30

Grossflottbeker THGC	0–2	Rüsselsheimer RK
	Report	Hocks 21', 51'

Grossflottbeker THGC, Hamburg
Umpires:
J. Borgmann (GER)
A. Calder (GER)

1 May 2021
13:00

Rüsselsheimer RK	2–2	Grossflottbeker THGC
Hocks 10'; Heinz 58'	Report	Fleschütz 4'; Schabacker 24'
Penalties
Heinz (penalty shoot-out missed); Tatarczuk (penalty shoot-out scored); Becker (penalty shoot-out missed); Bentscheck (penalty shoot-out scored); Hocks (penalty shoot-out scored)	3–4	(penalty shoot-out scored) Fleschütz; (penalty shoot-out scored) Cobano; (penalty shoot-out scored) Hansen; (penalty shoot-out missed) Iglesias; (penalty shoot-out scored) Polewczak

Rüsselsheimer RK, Rüsselsheim
Umpires:
L. Oßwald (GER)
P. Ostwaldt (GER)

1 May 2021
12:00

Rüsselsheimer RK	1–1	Grossflottbeker THGC
Tegtmeier 17'	Report	Nauck 56'
Penalties
Bentscheck (penalty shoot-out scored); Heinz (penalty shoot-out missed); Hocks (penalty shoot-out missed); Zimmermann (penalty shoot-out scored)	2–4	(penalty shoot-out scored) Fleschütz; (penalty shoot-out scored) Cobano; (penalty shoot-out scored) Hansen; (penalty shoot-out missed) Iglesias; (penalty shoot-out scored) Polewczak

Rüsselsheimer RK, Rüsselsheim
Umpires:
P. Ostwaldt (GER)
L. Oßwald (GER)

Grossflottbeker THGC won the series 2–1.

25 April 2021
12:00

Zehlendorfer Wespen	1–2	Münchner SC
Danne 37'	Report	Sambeth 20'; Bolle 43'

Zehlendorfer Wespen, Berlin
Umpires:
F. Bariszlovich (GER)
B. Ströhle (GER)

1 May 2021
12:00

Münchner SC	3–0	Zehlendorfer Wespen
Bolle 30'; Dorner 58'; Bleuel 60'	Report

Münchner SC, Munich
Umpires:
S. Johnson (GER)
F. Jung (GER)

== Play–offs ==
The quarter-finals were played in a best of three format with the first match hosted by the weaker-placed team on 25 April and the return match and potential third decisive match hosted by the better placed team on 1 and 2 May respectively. The semi-finals and final were hosted by Mannheimer HC in Mannheim, Baden-Württemberg.

=== Bracket ===
Quarter-finals
Mannheimer HC	3 (3)	2 (1)	4
Uhlenhorst Mülheim	3 (1)	2 (2)	0
UHC Hamburg	3 (3)	3 (2)	2
Rot-Weiss Köln	3 (2)	3 (3)	3
Düsseldorfer HC	2	2
Harvestehuder THC	1	0
Club an der Alster	6	1
Berliner HC	0	0

Semi-finals
8 May – Mannheim
Mannheimer HC (pen.)	1 (4)
Rot-Weiss Köln	1 (3)
8 May – Mannheim
Düsseldorfer HC (pen.)	0 (3)
Club an der Alster	0 (2)

Final
9 May – Mannheim
Mannheimer HC	1 (2)
Düsseldorfer HC (pen.)	1 (3)

==== Quarter-finals ====
Team 1	Series	Team 2	Game 1	Game 2	Game 3
Mannheimer HC	2–1	Uhlenhorst Mülheim	3–3 (3–1 pen.)	2–2 (1–2 pen.)	4–0
UHC Hamburg	1–2	Rot-Weiss Köln	3–3 (3–2 pen.)	3–3 (2–3 pen.)	2–3
Düsseldorfer HC	2–0	Harvestehuder THC	2–1	2–0	
Club an der Alster	2–0	Berliner HC	6–0	1–0	

24 April 2021
13:00

Uhlenhorst Mülheim	3–3	Mannheimer HC
Kiefer 52'; Ankenbrand 54'; Hemmerle 60'	Report	Von der Heyde 37'; Cavallero 41'; Neumann 46'
Penalties
Meister (penalty shoot-out scored); Kresken (penalty shoot-out missed); Birkner (penalty shoot-out missed); Kiefer (penalty shoot-out missed)	1–3	(penalty shoot-out scored) Zimmermann; (penalty shoot-out scored) Badia Bogner; (penalty shoot-out scored) Von der Heyde

Uhlenhorst Mülheim, Mülheim
Umpires:
F. Jung (GER)
L. Oßwald (GER)

1 May 2021
15:30

Mannheimer HC	2–2	Uhlenhorst Mülheim
Kurz 15'; Neumann 45'	Report	Schaunig 38'; Hahn 56'
Penalties
Zimmermann (penalty shoot-out missed); Von der Heyde (penalty shoot-out missed); Kurz (penalty shoot-out missed); Meffert (penalty shoot-out missed); Badia Bogner (penalty shoot-out scored) —— Von der Heyde (penalty shoot-out missed); Zimmermann (penalty shoot-out missed); Badia Bogner (penalty shoot-out missed); Kurz (penalty shoot-out missed)	1–2	(penalty shoot-out missed) Von Hülsen; (penalty shoot-out scored) Ankenbrand; (penalty shoot-out missed) Schaunig; (penalty shoot-out missed) Birkner; (penalty shoot-out missed) Meister —— (penalty shoot-out missed) Ankenbrand; (penalty shoot-out missed) Von Hülsen; (penalty shoot-out missed) Birkner; (penalty shoot-out scored) Schaunig

Mannheimer HC, Mannheim
Umpires:
Y. Holzmüller (GER)
R. Müller (GER)

2 May 2021
12:30

Mannheimer HC	4–0	Uhlenhorst Mülheim
Neumann 13'; Schmidt 47'; Von der Heyde 48'; Kurz 54'	Report

Mannheimer HC, Mannheim
Umpires:
Y. Holzmüller (GER)
R. Müller (GER)

Mannheimer HC won the series 2–1.

25 April 2021
13:00

Rot-Weiss Köln	3–3	UHC Hamburg
Boermans 24'; Grote 34', 48'	Report	Micheel 28', 47'; Wortmann 39'
Penalties
Pieper (penalty shoot-out missed); Maertens (penalty shoot-out scored); Lorenz (penalty shoot-out scored); Reuten (penalty shoot-out missed); Grote (penalty shoot-out missed)	2–3	(penalty shoot-out missed) Hillmann; (penalty shoot-out missed) Mandel; (penalty shoot-out scored) Seifert; (penalty shoot-out scored) Martin-Pelegrina; (penalty shoot-out scored) Stapenhorst

Rot-Weiss Köln, Cologne
Umpires:
L. Fernkorn (GER)
G. Küpper (GER)

1 May 2021
13:00

UHC Hamburg	3–3	Rot-Weiss Köln
Pluta 9'; Stapenhorst 35'; Günther 39'	Report	Reuten 5', 50'; Maertens 8'
Penalties
Hillmann (penalty shoot-out scored); Stomps (penalty shoot-out missed); Seifert (penalty shoot-out missed); Martin-Pelegrina (penalty shoot-out missed); Stapenhorst (penalty shoot-out scored) —— Stapenhorst (penalty shoot-out missed); Hillmann (penalty shoot-out missed); Martin-Pelegrina (penalty shoot-out missed); Seifert (penalty shoot-out missed); Stomps (penalty shoot-out missed); Stapenhorst (penalty shoot-out missed); Hillmann (penalty shoot-out missed); Martin-Pelegrina (penalty shoot-out missed); Seifert (penalty shoot-out missed)	2–3	(penalty shoot-out scored) Lorenz; (penalty shoot-out missed) Grote; (penalty shoot-out missed) Busch; (penalty shoot-out missed) Brux; (penalty shoot-out scored) Maertens —— (penalty shoot-out missed) Lorenz; (penalty shoot-out missed) Maertens; (penalty shoot-out missed) Brux; (penalty shoot-out missed) Grote; (penalty shoot-out missed) Busch; (penalty shoot-out missed) Lorenz; (penalty shoot-out missed) Maertens; (penalty shoot-out missed) Brux; (penalty shoot-out scored) Grote

UHC Hamburg, Hamburg
Umpires:
L. Fernkorn (GER)
H. Völker (GER)

2 May 2021
11:30

UHC Hamburg	2–3	Rot-Weiss Köln
Pluta 21'; Stapenhorst 28'	Report	Maertens 19'; Boermans 28'; Grote 52'

UHC Hamburg, Hamburg
Umpires:
O. Lohse (GER)
S. Wagner (GER)

Rot-Weiss Köln won the series 2–1.

24 April 2021
12:00

Harvestehuder THC	1–2	Düsseldorfer HC
Steyrer 13'	Report	Schwabe 53'; Sprink 59'

Harvestehuder HC, Hamburg
Umpires:
A. Korth (GER)
O. Lohse (GER)

1 May 2021
14:00

Düsseldorfer HC	2–0	Harvestehuder THC
Nolte 51'; Strauss 58'	Report

Düsseldorfer HC, Düsseldorf
Umpires:
G. Küpper (GER)
T. Schmidt (GER)

Düsseldorfer HC won the series 2–0.

24 April 2021
12:00

Berliner HC	0–6	Club an der Alster
	Report	Granitzki 6'; Huse 14'; Schröder 19', 32'; Sippel 36'; Grashoff 38'

Berliner HC, Berlin
Umpires:
T. Lipsky (GER)
N. Schuschel (GER)

1 May 2021
13:00

Club an der Alster	1–0	Berliner HC
Aring 23'	Report

Club an der Alster, Hamburg
Umpires:
O. Lohse (GER)
S. Wagner (GER)

Club an der Alster won the series 2–0.

==== Semi-finals ====
8 May 2021
10:00

Düsseldorfer HC	0–0	Club an der Alster
	Report
Penalties
Stoffelsma (penalty shoot-out scored); Oruz (penalty shoot-out scored); Strauss (penalty shoot-out scored); Lhotak (penalty shoot-out missed)	3–2	(penalty shoot-out missed) Gablać; (penalty shoot-out scored) Schröder; (penalty shoot-out scored) Huse; (penalty shoot-out missed) Wiedermann; (penalty shoot-out missed) Altenburg

Mannheimer HC, Mannheim
Umpires:
L. Fernkorn (GER)
P. Ostwaldt (GER)

8 May 2021
13:00

Mannheimer HC	1–1	Rot-Weiss Köln
Zimmermann 49'	Report	Grote 47'
Penalties
Zimmermann (penalty shoot-out scored); Von der Heyde (penalty shoot-out missed); Gerstenhöfer (penalty shoot-out scored); Cavallero (penalty shoot-out scored); F. Habif (penalty shoot-out missed) —— Zimmermann (penalty shoot-out scored)	4–3	(penalty shoot-out scored) Lorenz; (penalty shoot-out missed) Nobis; (penalty shoot-out scored) Brux; (penalty shoot-out missed) Maertens; (penalty shoot-out scored) Grote —— (penalty shoot-out missed) Lorenz

Mannheimer HC, Mannheim
Umpires:
F. Jung (GER)
L. Oßwald (GER)

==== Final ====
9 May 2021
13:00

Mannheimer HC	1–1	Düsseldorfer HC
F. Habif 51'	Report	Heßler 18'
Penalties
Zimmermann (penalty shoot-out missed); Von der Heyde (penalty shoot-out scored); Gerstenhöfer (penalty shoot-out missed); Badia Bogner (penalty shoot-out missed); Cavallero (penalty shoot-out scored)	2–3	(penalty shoot-out scored) Stoffelsma; (penalty shoot-out scored) Schubert; (penalty shoot-out missed) Strauss; (penalty shoot-out missed) Nolte; (penalty shoot-out scored) Oruz

Mannheimer HC, Mannheim
Umpires:
L. Fernkorn (GER)
F. Jung (GER)

== Top goalscorers ==
Rank	Player	Club	Goals
1	(Germany) Lena Micheel	UHC Hamburg	23
2	(Germany) Pia Maertens	Rot-Weiss Köln	18
3	(Germany) Charlotte Stapenhorst	UHC Hamburg	15
4	(Germany) Pauline Heinz	Rüsselsheimer RK	14
5	(Germany) Hannah Gablać	Club an der Alster	13
6	(Germany) Petra Ankenbrand	Uhlenhorst Mülheim	12
6	(Germany) Rebecca Grote	Rot-Weiss Köln	12
6	(Germany) Celina Hocks	Rüsselsheimer RK	12
9	(Germany) Emma-Sophie Heßler	Düsseldorfer HC	11
9	(Germany) Lilly Stoffelsma	Düsseldorfer HC	11
9	(Germany) Hanna Valentin	Club an der Alster	11
12	(Germany) Lisa Altenburg	Club an der Alster	10
12	(Germany) Laura Saenger	Harvestehuder THC	10
12	(Germany) Sara Strauss	Düsseldorfer HC	10
