= 2019 Women's FIH Pro League =

International field hockey competition

- Dates: 26 January – 29 June
- Teams: 9 (from 4 confederations)

Final positions
- Champions: Netherlands (1st title)
- Runner-up: Australia
- Third place: Germany

Tournament statistics
- Matches played: 76
- Goals scored: 266 (3.5 per match)
- Top scorer: (New Zealand) Olivia Merry (15 goals)
- Best player: (Netherlands) Frédérique Matla

The 2019 Women's FIH Pro League was the first season of the Pro League, the premier women's field hockey national team league series. The tournament started in January 2019 finished in June 2019 in Amstelveen, Netherlands.

The Netherlands defeated Australia 4–3 in a shoot-out after the final ended in a 2–2 draw to win the first FIH Pro League title.

The competition also served as a qualifier for the 2020 Summer Olympics with the four best teams qualifying for the FIH Olympic Qualifiers taking place in October and November 2019.

== Qualification ==
Nine teams competed in a round-robin tournament with home and away matches, played from January to June, with the top four teams advancing to the final at a pre-determined location. In July 2017, Hockey India decided to withdraw the women's national team from the competition as they estimated the chances of qualifying for the Summer Olympics to be higher when participating in the Hockey Series. Hockey India also cited lack of clarity in the ranking system. The International Hockey Federation subsequently invited Belgium instead.

- Argentina (4)
- Australia (3)
- Belgium (13)
- China (10)
- Germany (5)
- Great Britain (2)
- Netherlands (1)
- New Zealand (6)
- United States (12)

== Results ==
=== Standings ===
Pos	Team	Pld	W	SOW	SOL	L	GF	GA	GD	Pts	Qualification
1	Netherlands	16	15	0	0	1	41	10	+31	45	Grand Final and Olympic Qualifiers
2	Argentina	16	10	4	0	2	31	15	+16	38	Grand Final and Olympic Qualifiers
3	Australia	16	9	1	1	5	35	23	+12	30	Grand Final and Olympic Qualifiers
4	Germany	16	9	0	2	5	34	24	+10	29	Grand Final and Olympic Qualifiers
5	Belgium	16	6	1	1	8	21	27	−6	21	
6	New Zealand	16	6	0	0	10	29	32	−3	18	
7	China	16	4	0	2	10	27	40	−13	14	
8	Great Britain	16	3	2	1	10	22	37	−15	14	
9	United States	16	1	1	2	12	15	47	−32	7	

Source: FIH
Rules for classification: 1) points; 2) matches won; 3) goal difference; 4) goals for; 5) head-to-head result; 6) field goals scored.

=== Fixtures ===
All times are local.

26 January 2019
15:30

Argentina	2–0	Belgium
Jankunas 12'; A. Habif 42'	Report

Estadio Municipal de Hockey, Córdoba
Umpires:
Kelly Hudson (NZL)
Maggie Giddens (USA)

27 January 2019
16:30

New Zealand	0–1	Netherlands
	Report	Krekelaar 38'

North Harbour Hockey Stadium, Auckland
Umpires:
Aleisha Neumann (AUS)
Annelize Rostron (RSA)

1 February 2019
17:00

New Zealand	0–1	Belgium
	Report	Boon 59'

North Harbour Hockey Stadium, Auckland
Umpires:
Aleisha Neumann (AUS)
Liu Xiaoying (CHN)

2 February 2019
15:30

Argentina	2–2	United States
Rebecchi 46'; Merino 50'	Report	Allessie 14'; Moyer 24'
Penalties
Merino (penalty shoot-out scored); D'Elía (penalty shoot-out scored); Rebecchi (penalty shoot-out missed); Von der Heyde (penalty shoot-out scored)	3–1	(penalty shoot-out scored) Sharkey; (penalty shoot-out missed) Gonzales; (penalty shoot-out missed) Manley; (penalty shoot-out missed) Woods

Estadio Municipal de Hockey, Córdoba
Umpires:
Michelle Joubert (RSA)
Amber Church (NZL)

2 February 2019
17:00

Australia	1–0	Netherlands
Claxton 21'	Report

State Netball Hockey Centre, Melbourne
Umpires:
Aleesha Unka (NZL)
Emi Yamada (JPN)

3 February 2019
17:00

Australia	1–2	Belgium
Peris 57'	Report	Struijk 37'; Versavel 47'

State Netball Hockey Centre, Melbourne
Umpires:
Aleesha Umka (NZL)
Emi Yamada (JPN)

8 February 2019
19:00

New Zealand	5–1	Great Britain
Merry 5', 35', 51'; Gunson 19'; Robinson 59'	Report	Ansley 11'

Ngā Puna Wai Sports Hub, Christchurch
Umpires:
Irene Presenqui (ARG)
Ayanna McClean (TRI)

9 February 2019
17:00

Australia	4–3	China
Williams 13'; Malone 28'; Stewart 48'; S. Fitzpatrick 50'	Report	Zhong J. 25'; Dan 29'; Yong 56'

Tasmanian Hockey Centre, Hobart
Umpires:
Aleesha Unka (NZL)
Annelize Rostron (RSA)

10 February 2019
17:00

Australia	2–2	Germany
S. Taylor 9'; Stewart 32'	Report	Granitzki 22', 47'
Penalties
Bone (penalty shoot-out scored); Peris (penalty shoot-out scored); Williams (penalty shoot-out scored)	3–1	(penalty shoot-out scored) Lorenz; (penalty shoot-out missed) Gräve; (penalty shoot-out missed) Hauke; (penalty shoot-out missed) Pieper

Tasmanian Hockey Centre, Hobart
Umpires:
Aleesha Unka (NZL)
Annelize Rostron (RSA)

15 February 2019
17:00

New Zealand	1–3	Germany
Robinson 1'	Report	Stapenhorst 21'; Maertens 29'; Gablać 40'

Ngā Puna Wai Sports Hub, Christchurch
Umpires:
Michelle Joubert (RSA)
Kang Hyun-young (KOR)

16 February 2019
17:30

Australia	3–0	Great Britain
Commerford 15'; Williams 23'; S. Fitzpatrick 50'	Report

Perth Hockey Stadium, Perth
Umpires:
Kelly Hudson (NZL)
Kim Jung-hee (KOR)

16 February 2019
19:00

United States	0–5	Netherlands
	Report	Welten 5'; Leurink 8'; Matla 11', 25'; Keetels 17'

Kentner Stadium, Winston-Salem
Umpires:
Alison Keogh (IRE)
Carolina de la Fuente (ARG)

17 February 2019
17:30

New Zealand	2–0	China
Merry 32', 57'	Report

Ngā Puna Wai Sports Hub, Christchurch
Umpires:
Michelle Joubert (RSA)
Kang Hyun-young (KOR)

22 February 2019
18:30

Argentina	2–2	Germany
Merino 3'; Luchetti 43'	Report	Grote 37'; Müller-Wieland 39'
Penalties
Merino (penalty shoot-out missed); D'Elía (penalty shoot-out missed); Von der Heyde (penalty shoot-out scored); Rebecchi (penalty shoot-out scored); Albertario (penalty shoot-out scored); Von der Heyde (penalty shoot-out missed); Rebecchi (penalty shoot-out scored)	4–3	(penalty shoot-out scored) Lorenz; (penalty shoot-out scored) Hauke; (penalty shoot-out missed) Vivot; (penalty shoot-out scored) Gräve; (penalty shoot-out missed) Müller-Wieland; (penalty shoot-out missed) Lorenz; (penalty shoot-out missed) Hauke

CeNARD, Buenos Aires
Umpires:
Maggie Giddens (USA)
Annelize Rostron (RSA)

23 February 2019
14:00

China	2–2	Great Britain
Liang 11'; Gu 59'	Report	Neal 20'; Ansley 22'
Penalties
Liang (penalty shoot-out scored); Zhang J. (penalty shoot-out missed); Zhong M. (penalty shoot-out scored); Wang (penalty shoot-out missed); He (penalty shoot-out missed)	2–3	(penalty shoot-out missed) Martin; (penalty shoot-out scored) Sanders; (penalty shoot-out missed) Robertson; (penalty shoot-out scored) Pearne-Webb; (penalty shoot-out scored) Toman

Wujin Hockey Stadium, Changzhou
Umpires:
Ivona Makar (CRO)
Michelle Meister (GER)

24 February 2019
18:30

Argentina	1–2	Netherlands
D'Elía 14'	Report	Matla 17'; Sanders 34'

CeNARD, Buenos Aires
Umpires:
Maggie Giddens (USA)
Annelize Rostron (RSA)

2 March 2019
17:00

Australia	2–1	United States
Kenny 46'; Williams 52'	Report	Grega 7'

Sydney Olympic Park, Sydney
Umpires:
Amber Church (NZL)
Liu Xiaoying (CHN)

3 March 2019
14:00

China	1–2	Netherlands
Guo 52'	Report	Stam 21'; Moes 56'

Wujin Hockey Stadium, Changzhou
Umpires:
Alison Keogh (IRL)
Maggie Giddens (USA)

6 March 2019
14:00

China	2–1	Germany
Cui 29'; Zhang X. 40'	Report	Gablać 53'

Wujin Hockey Stadium, Changzhou
Umpires:
Kelly Hudson (NZL)
Maggie Giddens (USA)

8 March 2019
17:00

New Zealand	3–1	United States
Merry 19'; Pearce 25'; Gunson 34'	Report	Grega 51'

North Harbour Hockey Stadium, Auckland
Umpires:
Laurine Delforge (BEL)
Emi Yamada (JPN)

10 March 2019
16:30

New Zealand	0–3	Argentina
	Report	Albertario 14'; Retegui 23'; Luchetti 47'

North Harbour Hockey Stadium, Auckland
Umpires:
Laurine Delforge (BEL)
Emi Yamada (JPN)

16 March 2019
17:00

Australia	0–1	Argentina
	Report	Merino 24'

Sydney Olympic Park, Sydney
Umpires:
Laurine Delforge (BEL)
Liu Xiaoying (CHN)

17 March 2019
17:00

Australia	1–3	New Zealand
S. Fitzpatrick 48'	Report	Merry 17', 32'; Robinson 52'

Sydney Olympic Park, Sydney
Umpires:
Laurine Delforge (BEL)
Liu Xioaying (CHN)

21 March 2019
16:00

China	0–1	Argentina
	Report	Albertario 10'

Wujin Hockey Stadium, Changzhou
Umpires:
Michelle Meister (GER)
Ivona Makar (CRO)

22 March 2019
16:00

China	5–3	New Zealand
Cui 9'; Zhang X. 19'; Gu 51', 60+'; Guo 56'	Report	Michelsen 52'; Gloyn 54'; Keddell 60'

Wujin Hockey Stadium, Changzhou
Umpires:
Michelle Meister (GER)
Celine Martin-Schmets (BEL)

29 March 2019
19:00

United States	1–1	Belgium
Grega 50'	Report	Gerniers 5'
Penalties
Gonzales (penalty shoot-out missed); Manley (penalty shoot-out scored); Moyer (penalty shoot-out scored); Paolino (penalty shoot-out scored); Matson (penalty shoot-out missed); Manley (penalty shoot-out scored); Moyer (penalty shoot-out missed); Matson (penalty shoot-out missed); Gonzales (penalty shoot-out scored)	5–4	(penalty shoot-out missed) Versavel; (penalty shoot-out scored) Leclef; (penalty shoot-out missed) Ballenghien; (penalty shoot-out scored) Limauge; (penalty shoot-out scored) Puvrez; (penalty shoot-out scored) Leclef; (penalty shoot-out missed) Limauge; (penalty shoot-out missed) Versavel; (penalty shoot-out missed) Ballenghien

Spooky Nook Sports, Lancaster
Umpires:
Ayanna McClean (TTO)
Irene Presenqui (ARG)

31 March 2019
15:30

Argentina	1–0	China
D'Elía 37'	Report

Estadio Mundialista Luciana Aymar, Rosario
Umpires:
Laurine Delforge (BEL)
Allison Keogh (IRE)

31 March 2019
18:00

United States	1–3	Great Britain
Allessie 22'	Report	Owsley 27', 41'; Defroand 34'

Spooky Nook Sports, Lancaster
Umpires:
Michelle Joubert (RSA)
Irene Presenqui (ARG)

6 April 2019
18:00

Argentina	4–2	Great Britain
Jankunas 26', 31'; Zuloaga 34'; M. Granatto 56'	Report	Balsdon 28'; Jones 57'

Estadio Mundialista Luciana Aymar, Rosario
Umpires:
Laurine Delforge (BEL)
Allison Keogh (IRE)

7 April 2019
15:30

Belgium	4–1	China
Gerniers 22', 36', 40'; Ballenghien 33'	Report	Liang 52'

Royal Uccle Sport, Brussels
Umpires:
Michelle Meister (GER)
Ivona Makar (CRO)

10 April 2019
18:30

Belgium	2–1	United States
Weyns 39'; Versavel 60'	Report	Gonzales 44'

Royal Uccle Sport, Brussels
Umpires:
Carolina de la Fuente (ARG)
Ivona Makar (CRO)

10 April 2019
18:45

Netherlands	6–0	China
Van Maasakker 7', 42', 54'; Matla 48'; De Waard 51'; Veen 53'	Report

De Klapperboom, Utrecht
Umpires:
Celine Martin-Schmets (BEL)
Ayanna McClean (TTO)

13 April 2019
15:30

Argentina	3–1	New Zealand
Alonso 29'; Jankunas 48'; Trinchinetti 52'	Report	Michelsen 26'

Estadio Mundialista Luciana Aymar, Rosario
Umpires:
Aleisha Neumann (AUS)
Sarah Wilson (SCO)

14 April 2019
16:00

Netherlands	7–1	United States
De Waard 13', 22'; Fortuin 18', 37'; Jansen 41'; Keetels 45'; Van Maasakker 56'	Report	West 6'

Hazelaarweg Stadion, Rotterdam
Umpires:
Carolina de la Fuente (ARG)
Ayanna McClean (TTO)

24 April 2019
18:30

Germany	2–0	Great Britain
Gablać 38', 58'	Report

Hockeypark, Mönchengladbach
Umpires:
Kim Jung-hee (KOR)
Irene Presenqui (ARG)

25 April 2019
14:30

New Zealand	1–5	Australia
Ritchie 30'	Report	Nobbs 2'; Chalker 21'; S. Fitzpatrick 31'; Stewart 53', 58'

North Harbour Hockey Stadium, Auckland
Umpires:
Annelize Rostron (RSA)
Liu Xiaoying (CHN)

26 April 2019
18:30

Germany	0–1	Netherlands
	Report	Matla 3'

Hockeypark, Mönchengladbach
Umpires:
Kim Hung-hee (KOR)
Irene Presenqui (ARG)

27 April 2019
14:00

Great Britain	1–1	United States
Ansley 30'	Report	Moyer 44'
Penalties
Sanders (penalty shoot-out missed); Pearne-Webb (penalty shoot-out missed); Martin (penalty shoot-out missed); Howard (penalty shoot-out scored); Toman (penalty shoot-out scored)	2–1	(penalty shoot-out scored) Sharkey; (penalty shoot-out missed) Moyer; (penalty shoot-out missed) Gonzales; (penalty shoot-out missed) Magadan; (penalty shoot-out missed) West

Lee Valley Hockey and Tennis Centre, London
Umpires:
Michelle Meister (GER)
Celine Matin-Schmets (BEL)

28 April 2019
12:00

Germany	4–1	China
Lorenz 13', 21'; Micheel 49'; Grote 53'	Report	Peng 2'

Hockeypark, Mönchengladbach
Umpires:
Kim Hung-hee (KOR)
Irene Presenqui (ARG)

30 April 2019
18:30

Germany	2–1	United States
Micheel 11'; Lorenz 53'	Report	West 45'

Hockeypark, Mönchengladbach
Umpires:
Laurine Delforge (BEL)
Irene Presenqui (ARG)

3 May 2019
19:30

Great Britain	1–2	China
Ansley 41'	Report	Ou 35'; Peng 44'

Lee Valley Hockey and Tennis Centre, London
Umpires:
Celine Martin-Schmets (BEL)
Alison Keogh (IRL)

4 May 2019
16:00

Argentina	1–1	Australia
D'Elía 18'	Report	M. Fitzpatrick 2'
Penalties
D'Elía (penalty shoot-out scored); Von der Heyde (penalty shoot-out missed); Alonso (penalty shoot-out missed); Rebecchi (penalty shoot-out scored); Jankunas (penalty shoot-out scored)	3–1	(penalty shoot-out missed) Bone; (penalty shoot-out scored) Bates; (penalty shoot-out missed) Peris; (penalty shoot-out missed) Nobbs

CeNARD, Buenos Aires
Umpires:
Amber Church (NZL)
Karen Bennett (NZL)

10 May 2019
19:00

United States	0–4	Australia
	Report	Malone 19'; S. Fitzpatrick 50', 51'; Chalker 58'

Spooky Nook Sports, Lancaster
Umpires:
Kelly Hudson (NZL)
Ayanna McClean (TTO)

12 May 2019
18:00

United States	0–4	Argentina
	Report	Albertario 21'; Rebecchi 37'; V. Granatto 52', 53'

Spooky Nook Sports, Lancaster
Umpires:
Kelly Hudson (NZL)
Ivona Makar (CRO)

18 May 2019
13:00

Great Britain	1–1	Argentina
Owsley 56'	Report	Albertario 52'
Penalties
Toman (penalty shoot-out missed); Martin (penalty shoot-out missed); Pearne-Webb (penalty shoot-out scored); Jones (penalty shoot-out missed); Evans (penalty shoot-out missed)	1–2	(penalty shoot-out scored) D'Elía; (penalty shoot-out missed) Albertario; (penalty shoot-out missed) Alonso; (penalty shoot-out missed) Rebecchi; (penalty shoot-out scored) Jankunas

Lee Valley Hockey and Tennis Centre, London
Umpires:
Liu Xiaoying (CHN)
Kelly Hudson (NZL)

18 May 2019
19:00

United States	3–1	China
Dessoye 20'; Moyer 27'; Gonzales 40'	Report	Peng 53'

Spooky Nook Sports, Lancaster
Umpires:
Celine Martin-Schmets (BEL)
Ayanna McClean (TTO)

19 May 2019
13:00

Great Britain	2–0	Belgium
Balsdon 43'; Owsley 53'	Report

Lee Valley Hockey and Tennis Centre, London
Umpires:
Liu Xiaoying (CHN)
Kelly Hudson (NZL)

22 May 2019
18:30

Germany	1–2	Argentina
Stapenhorst 33'	Report	Costa Biondi 55'; D'Elía 60'

Crefelder Hockey und Tennis Club, Krefeld
Umpires:
Annelize Rostron (RSA)
Alison Keogh (IRL)

25 May 2019
16:00

China	3–3	Belgium
Zhang X. 2'; Liang 3'; Peng 40'	Report	Puvrez 33'; Sinia 51'; Struijk 53'
Penalties
Liang (penalty shoot-out missed); He (penalty shoot-out scored); Zhong (penalty shoot-out scored); Zhang X. (penalty shoot-out scored); Peng (penalty shoot-out scored); Liang (penalty shoot-out missed)	4–5	(penalty shoot-out scored) Leclef; (penalty shoot-out missed) Duquesne; (penalty shoot-out scored) Gerniers; (penalty shoot-out scored) Puvrez; (penalty shoot-out scored) Vanden Borre; (penalty shoot-out scored) Gerniers

Wujin Hockey Stadium, Changzhou
Umpires:
Aleisha Neumann (AUS)
Kang Hyun-young (KOR)

30 May 2019
15:30

Belgium	4–1	Great Britain
Leclef 7'; Vandermeiren 15+'; Weyns 38'; Nelen 52'	Report	Robertson 51'

Wilrijkse Plein Antwerp, Antwerp
Umpires:
Alison Keogh (IRL)
Ivona Makar (CRO)

1 June 2019
16:00

Netherlands	2–0	Great Britain
Matla 12'; Veen 20'	Report

Sportpark Aalsterweg, Eindhoven
Umpires:
Laurine Delforge (BEL)
Michelle Meister (GER)

1 June 2019
19:00

United States	0–3	New Zealand
	Report	Davey 20'; Gloyn 32'; Merry 51'

Spooky Nook Sports, Lancaster
Umpires:
Celine Martin-Schmets (BEL)
Kang Hyun-young (KOR)

2 June 2019
15:30

Belgium	0–4	Germany
	Report	Stapenhorst 3', 10', 58'; Grote 40'

Wilrijkse Plein Antwerp, Antwerp
Umpires:
Carolina de la Fuente (ARG)
Sarah Wilson (SCO)

2 June 2019
16:00

China	2–3	Australia
Chen 14'; Xu 59'	Report	M. Fitzpatrick 45'; Chalker 49'; Malone 56'

Wujin Hockey Stadium, Changzhou
Umpires:
Karen Bennett (NZL)
Emi Yamada (JPN)

4 June 2019
17:30

Netherlands	2–1	Germany
Matla 6'; Van Maasakker 46'	Report	Maertens 48'

Sportpark Aalsterweg, Eindhoven
Umpires:
Alison Keogh (IRE)
Liu Xiaoying (CHN)

7 June 2019
19:30

Great Britain	3–4	Germany
Howard 10', 17'; Petter 52'	Report	Wortmann 26'; Lorenz 40'; Micheel 54'; Stapenhorst 60'

Lee Valley Hockey and Tennis Centre, London
Umpires:
Michelle Joubert (RSA)
Carolina de la Fuente (ARG)

8 June 2019
15:30

Belgium	1–2	Netherlands
Sinia 52'	Report	Jansen 20'; Zerbo 41'

Wilrijkse Plein Antwerp, Antwerp
Umpires:
Sarah Wilson (SCO)
Ayanna McClean (TTO)

9 June 2019
12:00

Germany	2–1	New Zealand
Maertens 48'; Pieper 52'	Report	Pearce 8'

Crefelder Hockey und Tennis Club, Krefeld
Umpires:
Alison Keogh (IRE)
Sarah Wilson (SCO)

9 June 2019
13:30

Netherlands	2–0	Belgium
Matla 44'; Van Maasakker 60'	Report

HC Den Bosch, 's-Hertogenbosch
Umpires:
Michelle Meister (GER)
Ivona Makar (CRO)

9 June 2019
16:00

Great Britain	2–4	Australia
Webb 43'; Howard 53'	Report	M. Fitzpatrick 18'; Peris 18'; Claxton 23'; Williams 37'

Lee Valley Hockey and Tennis Centre, London
Umpires:
Michelle Joubert (RSA)
Carolina de la Fuente (ARG)

12 June 2019
18:30

Germany	2–1	Belgium
Lorenz 51'; Maertens 56'	Report	Ballenghien 4'

Crefelder Hockey und Tennis Club, Krefeld
Umpires:
Maggie Giddens (USA)
Ayanna McClean (TRI)

12 June 2019
19:30

Netherlands	3–2	New Zealand
Jonker 21'; Albers 24'; De Waard 55'	Report	Merry 44', 54'

HC Den Bosch, 's-Hertogenbosch
Umpires:
Michelle Meister (GER)
Sarah Wilson (SCO)

15 June 2019
16:00

China	4–0	United States
Peng 29'; Gu 37'; Zhang X. 40'; Guo 46'	Report

Wujin Hockey Stadium, Changzhou
Umpires:
Ivona Makar (CRO)
Aleisha Neumann (AUS)

15 June 2019
16:00

Great Britain	0–1	Netherlands
	Report	Jonker 59'

Lee Valley Hockey and Tennis Centre, London
Umpires:
Laurine Delforge (BEL)
Ayanna McClean (TTO)

16 June 2019
12:00

Germany	1–3	Australia
Gablać 32'	Report	Claxton 2', 3'; Chalker 21'

Crefelder Hockey und Tennis Club, Krefeld
Umpires:
Celine Martin-Schmets (BEL)
Sarah Wilson (SCO)

16 June 2019
16:30

Belgium	0–3	New Zealand
	Report	Merry 36', 44', 59'

Wilrijkse Plein Antwerp, Antwerp
Umpires:
Michelle Meister (GER)
Alison Keogh (IRL)

19 June 2019
18:30

Belgium	1–0	Australia
Ballenghien 54'	Report

Wilrijkse Plein Antwerp, Antwerp
Umpires:
Alison Keogh (IRE)
Michelle Meister (GER)

20 June 2019
19:30

Netherlands	2–1	Argentina
Welten 24'; Matla 26'	Report	Retegui 22'

De Klapperboom, Utrecht
Umpires:
Laurine Delforge (BEL)
Sarah Wilson (SCO)

22 June 2019
19:00

United States	2–3	Germany
Grega 19'; Hoffman 45'	Report	Granitzki 20'; Hauke 34'; Grote 39'

Spooky Nook Sports, Lancaster
Umpires:
Ayanna McClean (TTO)
Karen Bennett (NZL)

23 June 2019
15:00

Netherlands	3–1	Australia
Van den Assem 14'; Leurink 51'; Verschoor 54'	Report	Chalker 57'

Wagener Stadium, Amstelveen
Umpires:
Michelle Joubert (RSA)
Amber Church (NZL)

23 June 2019
15:30

Belgium	1–2	Argentina
Vanden Borre 60'	Report	Retegui 17'; M. Granatto 23'

Wilrijkse Plein Antwerp, Antwerp
Umpires:
Sarah Wilson (SCO)
Alison Keogh (IRL)

23 June 2019
16:30

Great Britain	3–1	New Zealand
Martin 23'; Owsley 34', 42'	Report	Merry 44'

Twickenham Stoop, London
Umpires:
Liu Xiaoying (CHN)
Michelle Meister (GER)

=== Grand Final ===
Semi-finals
27 June
Netherlands	2
Germany	1
27 June
Argentina	1 (3)
Australia (p.s.o.)	1 (4)

Final
29 June
Netherlands (p.s.o.)	2 (4)
Australia	2 (3)
Third place
29 June
Germany (p.s.o.)	1 (3)
Argentina	1 (1)

==== Semifinals ====
27 June 2019
17:15

Argentina	1–1	Australia
Jankunas 4'	Report	Kenny 29'
Penalties
Rebecchi (penalty shoot-out missed); D'Elía (penalty shoot-out scored); Albertario (penalty shoot-out scored); Jankunas (penalty shoot-out scored); Di Santo (penalty shoot-out missed); D'Elía (penalty shoot-out missed)	3–4	(penalty shoot-out scored) Malone; (penalty shoot-out scored) Nobbs; (penalty shoot-out missed) Kenny; (penalty shoot-out missed) Peris; (penalty shoot-out scored) Williams; (penalty shoot-out scored) Malone

Wagener Stadium, Amstelveen
Umpires:
Michelle Meister (GER)
Michelle Joubert (RSA)

27 June 2019
20:00

Netherlands	2–1	Germany
Matla 52'; Welten 56'	Report	Grote 14'

Wagener Stadium, Amstelveen
Umpires:
Amber Church (NZL)
Sarah Wilson (SCO)

==== Third place game ====
29 June 2019
14:00

Germany	1–1	Argentina
Schröder 32'	Report	Retegui 6'
Penalties
Schröder (penalty shoot-out missed); Gräve (penalty shoot-out missed); Müller-Wieland (penalty shoot-out scored); Maertens (penalty shoot-out scored); Huse (penalty shoot-out scored)	3–1	(penalty shoot-out missed) Albertario; (penalty shoot-out missed) Habif; (penalty shoot-out scored) Rebecchi; (penalty shoot-out missed) Von der Heyde

Wagener Stadium, Amstelveen
Umpires:
Amber Church (NZL)
Michelle Joubert (RSA)

==== Final ====
29 June 2019
16:00

Netherlands	2–2	Australia
Veen 24'; Jonker 49'	Report	Williams 19'; Nobbs 58'
Penalties
Keetels (penalty shoot-out scored); De Waard (penalty shoot-out scored); Verschoor (penalty shoot-out scored); Veen (penalty shoot-out missed); Stam (penalty shoot-out scored)	4–3	(penalty shoot-out scored) Nobbs; (penalty shoot-out scored) Malone; (penalty shoot-out missed) M. Fitzpatrick; (penalty shoot-out scored) Williams; (penalty shoot-out missed) Peris

Wagener Stadium, Amstelveen
Umpires:
Laurine Delforge (BEL)
Sarah Wilson (SCO)

== Awards ==
Player of the League	Top Goalscorer	Goalkeeper of the Grand Final	Goal of the Grand Final
(Netherlands) Frédérique Matla	(New Zealand) Olivia Merry	(Australia) Rachael Lynch	(Argentina) Micaela Retegui

== Statistics ==
=== Final standings ===
Pos	Team	Pld	W	SOW	SOL	L	GF	GA	GD	Pts	Final standing
1st place, gold medalist(s)	Netherlands	18	16	1	0	1	45	13	+32	50	Gold Medal
2nd place, silver medalist(s)	Australia	18	9	2	2	5	38	26	+12	33	Silver Medal
3rd place, bronze medalist(s)	Germany	18	9	1	2	6	36	27	+9	31	Bronze Medal
4	Argentina	18	10	4	2	2	33	17	+16	40	Fourth place
5	Belgium	16	6	1	1	8	21	27	−6	21	Eliminated in group stage
6	New Zealand	16	6	0	0	10	29	32	−3	18	Eliminated in group stage
7	China	16	4	0	2	10	27	40	−13	14	Eliminated in group stage
8	Great Britain	16	3	2	1	10	22	37	−15	14	Eliminated in group stage
9	United States	16	1	1	2	12	15	47	−32	7	Eliminated in group stage

Source: FIH
Rules for classification: 1) points; 2) matches won; 3) goal difference; 4) goals for; 5) head-to-head result; 6) field goals scored.

=== Goalscorers ===
There were 266 goals scored in 76 matches, for an average of 3.5 goals per match.

15 goals

- (New Zealand) Olivia Merry

10 goals

- (Netherlands) Frédérique Matla

6 goals

- (Australia) Savannah Fitzpatrick
- (Germany) Charlotte Stapenhorst
- (United Kingdom) Lily Owsley
- (Netherlands) Caia van Maasakker

5 goals

- (Argentina) Julieta Jankunas
- (Australia) Emily Chalker
- (Australia) Mariah Williams
- (China) Peng Yang
- (Germany) Hannah Gablać
- (Germany) Rebecca Grote
- (Germany) Nike Lorenz

4 goals

- (Argentina) Agustina Albertario
- (Argentina) Silvina D'Elía
- (Argentina) Micaela Retegui
- (Australia) Jane Claxton
- (Australia) Grace Stewart
- (Belgium) Alix Gerniers
- (China) Gu Bingfeng
- (China) Zhang Xiaoxue
- (Germany) Pia Maertens
- (United Kingdom) Giselle Ansley
- (Netherlands) Xan de Waard
- (United States) Danielle Grega

3 goals

- (Argentina) Delfina Merino
- (Australia) Madison Fitzpatrick
- (Australia) Ambrosia Malone
- (Belgium) Ambre Ballenghien
- (China) Guo Qiu
- (China) Liang Meiyu
- (Germany) Hanna Granitzki
- (Germany) Lena Micheel
- (United Kingdom) Tessa Howard
- (Netherlands) Kelly Jonker
- (Netherlands) Marijn Veen
- (Netherlands) Lidewij Welten
- (New Zealand) Amy Robinson
- (United States) Lauren Moyer

2 goals

- (Argentina) María José Granatto
- (Argentina) Victoria Granatto
- (Argentina) Rosario Luchetti
- (Argentina) Carla Rebecchi
- (Australia) Jodie Kenny
- (Australia) Kaitlin Nobbs
- (Australia) Brooke Peris
- (Belgium) Pauline Leclef
- (Belgium) Michelle Struijk
- (Belgium) Louise Versavel
- (Belgium) Anne-Sophie Weyns
- (China) Cui Qiuxia
- (United Kingdom) Grace Balsdon
- (Netherlands) Kyra Fortuin
- (Netherlands) Yibbi Jansen
- (Netherlands) Marloes Keetels
- (Netherlands) Laurien Leurink
- (New Zealand) Shiloh Gloyn
- (New Zealand) Ella Gunson
- (New Zealand) Stacey Michelsen
- (New Zealand) Kirsten Pearce
- (United States) Mackenzie Allessie
- (United States) Linnea Gonzales
- (United States) Taylor West

1 goal

- (Argentina) Agostina Alonso
- (Argentina) Valentina Costa Biondi
- (Argentina) Agustina Habif
- (Argentina) Eugenia Trinchinetti
- (Argentina) Victoria Zuloaga
- (Australia) Kalindi Commerford
- (Australia) Sophie Taylor
- (Belgium) Barbara Nelen
- (Belgium) Emma Puvrez
- (Belgium) Emilie Sinia
- (Belgium) Stéphanie Vanden Borre
- (Belgium) Judith Vandermeiren
- (China) Chen Yi
- (China) Dan Wen
- (China) Ou Zixia
- (China) Xu Wenyu
- (China) Yong Jing
- (China) Zhong Jiaqi
- (Germany) Franzisca Hauke
- (Germany) Janne Müller-Wieland
- (Germany) Cécile Pieper
- (Germany) Anne Schröder
- (Germany) Amelie Wortmann
- (United Kingdom) Emily Defroand
- (United Kingdom) Sarah Jones
- (United Kingdom) Hannah Martin
- (United Kingdom) Lizzie Neal
- (United Kingdom) Isabelle Petter
- (United Kingdom) Sarah Robertson
- (United Kingdom) Hollie Webb
- (Netherlands) Felice Albers
- (Netherlands) Ireen van den Assem
- (Netherlands) Maartje Krekelaar
- (Netherlands) Freeke Moes
- (Netherlands) Pien Sanders
- (Netherlands) Lauren Stam
- (Netherlands) Maria Verschoor
- (Netherlands) Ginella Zerbo
- (New Zealand) Tarryn Davey
- (New Zealand) Rose Keddell
- (New Zealand) Deanna Ritchie
- (United States) Anna Dessoye
- (United States) Ashley Hoffman

Source: FIH

== See also ==
- 2019 Men's FIH Pro League
- 2018–19 Women's Hockey Series
