= 2019 Women's FIH Olympic Qualifiers =

Field hockey competition

Tournament details
- Dates: 25 October – 3 November
- Teams: 14 (from 4 confederations)
- Venue(s): 7 (in 7 host cities)

Tournament statistics
- Matches played: 14
- Goals scored: 46 (3.29 per match)
- Top scorer(s): (Australia) Emily Chalker (3 goals)

The 2019 Women's FIH Olympic Qualifiers was the final stage of the qualification for the women's field hockey event at the 2020 Summer Olympics. It was held in October and November 2019.

== Format ==
Originally, twelve teams were to take part in the Olympic qualifying events. These teams were to be drawn into six pairs; each pair playing a two-match, aggregate score series. The winner of each series qualified for the Olympics. As Japan won the 2018 Asian Games (thereby qualifying twice, once as host and once as Asian champions), there instead were 14 teams, seven of whom qualified. The seven Olympic qualifiers each featured two nations playing two back-to-back matches, with nations drawn to play each other based on their rankings at the end of the 2018 / 2019 Continental Championships. The qualifiers were held in October and November 2019 with the matches hosted by the higher-ranked of the two competing nations.

== Qualification ==
The participating teams were confirmed on 29 August 2019 by the International Hockey Federation.

Dates	Event(s)	Location	Quota	Qualifier(s)
26 January – 29 June 2019	2019 FIH Pro League		2 (Note: As two of the four FIH Pro League qualifiers had already qualified for the Olympics through their confederation's tournaments, the two FIH Pro League qualifying spots were added to the (originally four) FIH World Rankings quota.)	~~Argentina~~ (Note: Argentina, the Netherlands, and New Zealand already qualified directly for the 2020 Summer Olympics by winning their continental championships, so they were replaced by the highest ranked teams not already qualified.); Australia; Germany; ~~Netherlands~~
8–16 June 2019	2018–19 FIH Series Finals	(Northern Ireland) Banbridge	2	Ireland; South Korea
15–23 June 2019	2018–19 FIH Series Finals	(Japan) Hiroshima	1	India; ~~Japan~~ (Note: Japan finished in the top two and cannot qualify for the Olympic Qualifiers because they are already qualified for the 2020 Summer Olympics, the team that finished third does not automatically qualify for the FIH Olympic qualifiers. Any such additional place is determined by the FIH World Rankings as at the completion of the continental championships.)
19–27 June 2019	2018–19 FIH Series Finals	(Spain) Valencia	2	Canada; Spain
8 September 2019	FIH World Rankings		7	Belgium; Chile; China; Great Britain; Italy; ~~New Zealand~~; Russia; United States
Total			14	

== Seeding ==
The seeding was announced on 8 September 2019.

Pot 1 (Host teams)
Team	Rank
Australia	2
Germany	4
Great Britain	5

Pot 2 (Host teams)
Team	Rank
Spain	7
Ireland	8
India	9
China	10

Pot 3 (Away teams)
Team	Rank
South Korea	11
Belgium	12
United States	13
Canada	15

Pot 4 (Away teams)
Team	Rank
Italy	17
Chile	18
Russia	19

== Overview ==
The first legs were played on 25 October or 1 and 2 November 2019, and the second legs on 26 October or 2 and 3 November 2019.

Team 1	Agg.	Team 2	1st leg	2nd leg
Australia	9–2	Russia	4–2	5–0
China	2–2 (2–1 p.s.o.)	Belgium	0–2	2–0
Spain	4–1	South Korea	2–1	2–0
India	6–5	United States	5–1	1–4
Germany	9–0	Italy	2–0	7–0
Great Britain	5–1	Chile	3–0	2–1
Ireland	0–0 (4–3 p.s.o.)	Canada	0–0	0–0

=== Matches ===
25 October 2019
15:00

Australia	4–2	Russia
Chalker 1', 48'; Lawton 2'; Stewart 38'	Report	Sadovaia 8'; Khalimova 37'

Perth Hockey Stadium, Perth
Umpires:
Kim Jung-hee (KOR)
Kelly Hudson (NZL)

26 October 2019
19:00

Australia	5–0	Russia
Stewart 9'; Williams 22', 30'; Taylor 25'; Chalker 27'	Report

Perth Hockey Stadium, Perth
Umpires:
Kelly Hudson (NZL)
Cookie Tan (SGP)

Australia won 9–2 on aggregate.

25 October 2019
16:00

China	0–2	Belgium
	Report	Boon 2'; Vanden Borre 59'

Wujin Hockey Stadium, Changzhou
Umpires:
Maggie Giddens (USA)
Emi Yamada (JPN)

26 October 2019
16:00

China	2–0	Belgium
Gu 56'; Liang 57'	Report
Penalties
Liang (penalty shoot-out missed); Zhang X. (penalty shoot-out missed); Wang (penalty shoot-out scored); Chen (penalty shoot-out missed); Li J. (penalty shoot-out missed); Li J. (penalty shoot-out scored)	2–1	(penalty shoot-out missed) Leclef; (penalty shoot-out missed) Puvrez; (penalty shoot-out missed) Gerniers; (penalty shoot-out missed) Versavel; (penalty shoot-out scored) Ballenghien; (penalty shoot-out missed) Gerniers

Wujin Hockey Stadium, Changzhou
Umpires:
Aleisha Neumann (AUS)
Emi Yamada (JPN)

2–2 on aggregate. China won 2–1 after penalty-shootout.

25 October 2019
20:00

Spain	2–1	South Korea
Iglesias 23'; Riera 39'	Report	Jang 19'

Estadio Betero, Valencia
Umpires:
Sarah Wilson (SCO)
Michelle Joubert (RSA)

26 October 2019
20:00

Spain	2–0	South Korea
García Grau 12'; Riera 56'	Report

Estadio Betero, Valencia
Umpires:
Sarah Wilson (SCO)
Michelle Joubert (RSA)

Spain won 4–1 on aggregate.

1 November 2019
18:00

India	5–1	United States
Lilima 28'; Sharmila 40'; Gurjit 42', 51'; Navneet 46'	Report	Matson 54'

Kalinga Stadium, Bhubaneswar
Umpires:
Irene Presenqui (ARG)
Liu Xiaoying (CHN)

2 November 2019
18:00

India	1–4	United States
Rani 48'	Report	Magadan 5', 28'; Sharkey 14'; Parker 20'

Kalinga Stadium, Bhubaneswar
Umpires:
Liu Xiaoying (CHN)
Irene Presenqui (ARG)

India won 6–5 on aggregate.

2 November 2019
16:00

Germany	2–0	Italy
Gablać 38'; Lorenz 60'	Report

Warsteiner HockeyPark, Mönchengladbach
Umpires:
Alison Keogh (IRL)
Chieko Soma (JPN)

3 November 2019
14:30

Germany	7–0	Italy
Pieper 2', 43'; Lorenz 2'; Micheel 8'; Gräve 40', 55'; Maertens 60+'	Report

Warsteiner HockeyPark, Mönchengladbach
Umpires:
Alison Keogh (IRL)
Chieko Soma (JPN)

Germany won 9–0 on aggregate.

2 November 2019
14:00

Great Britain	3–0	Chile
Petter 35'; Martin 45'; Toman 53'	Report

Lee Valley Hockey and Tennis Centre, London
Umpires:
Laurine Delforge (BEL)
Ayanna McClean (TTO)

3 November 2019
12:00

Great Britain	2–1	Chile
Howard 4'; Unsworth 7'	Report	Villagran 57'

Lee Valley Hockey and Tennis Centre, London
Umpires:
Ayanna McClean (TTO)
Laurine Delforge (BEL)

Great Britain won 5–1 on aggregate.

2 November 2019
19:00

Ireland	0–0	Canada
	Report

Donnybrook Stadium, Dublin
Umpires:
Ivona Makar (CRO)
Michelle Meister (GER)

3 November 2019
19:10

Ireland	0–0	Canada
	Report
Penalties
Pinder (penalty shoot-out missed); Daly (penalty shoot-out scored); Upton (penalty shoot-out missed); Barr (penalty shoot-out scored); Watkins (penalty shoot-out scored); Upton (penalty shoot-out scored)	4–3	(penalty shoot-out scored) Norlander; (penalty shoot-out scored) Woodcroft; (penalty shoot-out scored) Wright; (penalty shoot-out missed) Stairs; (penalty shoot-out missed) Johnston; (penalty shoot-out missed) Woodcroft

Donnybrook Stadium, Dublin
Umpires:
Michelle Meister (GER)
Annelize Rostron (RSA)

0–0 on aggregate. Ireland won 4–3 after penalty-shootout.

== Goalscorers ==
There were 46 goals scored in 14 matches, for an average of 3.29 goals per match.

3 goals

- (Australia) Emily Chalker

2 goals

- (Australia) Grace Stewart
- (Australia) Mariah Williams
- (Germany) Elisa Gräve
- (Germany) Nike Lorenz
- (Germany) Cécile Pieper
- (India) Gurjit Kaur
- (Spain) Lola Riera
- (United States) Amanda Magadan

1 goal

- (Australia) Amy Lawton
- (Australia) Sophie Taylor
- (Belgium) Jill Boon
- (Belgium) Stephanie Vanden Borre
- (Chile) Fernanda Villagran
- (China) Gu Bingfeng
- (China) Liang Meiyu
- (Germany) Hannah Gablać
- (Germany) Pia Maertens
- (Germany) Lena Micheel
- (United Kingdom) Tessa Howard
- (United Kingdom) Hannah Martin
- (United Kingdom) Isabelle Petter
- (United Kingdom) Anna Toman
- (United Kingdom) Laura Unsworth
- (India) Sharmila Devi
- (India) Navneet Kaur
- (India) Lilima Minz
- (India) Rani Rampal
- (Russia) Alina Khalimova
- (Russia) Bogdana Sadovaia
- (South Korea) Jang Hee-sun
- (Spain) Begoña García Grau
- (Spain) Belén Iglesias
- (United States) Erin Matson
- (United States) Alyssa Parker
- (United States) Kathleen Sharkey

Source: FIH

== See also ==
- 2019 Men's FIH Olympic Qualifiers
