= Kira Horn =

German field hockey player

Personal information
- Full name: Kira Leonie Horn
- Born: 12 February 1995 (age 31) Hamburg, Germany
- Height: 1.64 m (5 ft 5 in)
- Weight: 53 kg (117 lb)

Sport
- Sport: Field hockey
- Position: Midfielder
- Club: Club an der Alster
National team
Years	Team	Caps	Goals
2012–2016	Germany U–21	55	-
2019–	Germany	36	(2)
Medal record
Women's field hockey
Representing Germany
FIH Pro League
Bronze medal – third place	2019 Amsterdam
EuroHockey Nations Championship
Silver medal – second place	2019 Antwerp
Silver medal – second place	2021 Amstelveen
Bronze medal – third place	2023 Mönchengladbach

Kira Leonie Horn (born 12 February 1995) is a German field hockey player, who plays as a midfielder.

== Career ==
=== Club hockey ===
In the German Bundesliga, Horn plays club hockey for Club an der Alster.

=== National teams ===
==== Under–21 ====
Kira Horn represented the Germany U–21 side on numerous occasions throughout her junior career. Her most notable performance with the team was at the 2016 FIH Junior World Cup in Santiago, Chile. During the tournament Horn scored two goals, helping the German team to a fifth-place finish.

==== Die Danas ====
In 2019, Horn made her debut for the German national team during the inaugural tournament of the FIH Pro League. The team eventually won a bronze medal at the Grand Final in Amsterdam, Netherlands, Horn's first in German colours. Horn represented the team again in August at the EuroHockey Nations Championship in Antwerp, Belgium. At the tournament, Germany finished in second place, winning Horn a silver medal.

In December 2019, Horn was named in the preliminary German Olympic squad to train for the 2020 Summer Olympics in Tokyo, Japan.
