= 2019 EuroHockey Nations Championship =

2019 EuroHockey Nations Championship may refer to:

- 2019 Women's EuroHockey Nations Championship
- 2019 Men's EuroHockey Nations Championship
