= Pia Maertens =

German field hockey player

Personal information
- Born: 6 January 1999 (age 27) Duisburg, Germany

Sport
- Sport: Field hockey
- Position: Forward
National team
Years	Team	Caps	Goals
2019–	Germany U–21	1	(0)
2019–	Germany	29	(13)
Medal record
Women's field hockey
Representing Germany
European Championship
Silver medal – second place	2019 Antwerp
Silver medal – second place	2021 Amstelveen
FIH Pro League
Bronze medal – third place	2019 Amstelveen

Pia Maertens (born 6 January 1999) is a German field hockey player, who plays as a forward.

== Career ==
=== Junior National Team ===
In 2019 Pia Maertens made her debut for the Germany U–21 side in a test match against the United States junior national team in Viersen, Germany.

=== Senior National Teams ===
Maertens also debuted for the senior national team in 2019, during the inaugural FIH Pro League. During the tournament, Maertens scored 4 goals for Germany, and was a member of the team that won bronze in the Grand Final.

Following her performance in the FIH Pro League, German head coach Xavier Reckinger named Maertens in the final squad for the 2019 EuroHockey Nations Championship in Antwerp, Belgium.

==== International Goals ====
Goal	Date	Location	Opponent	Score	Result	Competition	Ref.
1	15 February 2019	Ngā Puna Wai Sports Hub, Christchurch, New Zealand	New Zealand	2–1	3–1	2019 FIH Pro League	
2	4 June 2019	Sportpark Aalsterweg, Eindhoven, Netherlands	Netherlands	1–2	1–2	2019 FIH Pro League	
3	9 June 2019	Crefelder HTC, Krefeld, Germany	New Zealand	1–1	2–1	2019 FIH Pro League	
4	12 June 2019	Crefelder HTC, Krefeld, Germany	Belgium	2–1	2–1	2019 FIH Pro League	
5	18 August 2019	Wilrijkse Plein, Antwerp, Belgium	Belarus	2–0	13–0	2019 EuroHockey Championship	
6	18 August 2019	Wilrijkse Plein, Antwerp, Belgium	Belarus	5–0	13–0	2019 EuroHockey Championship	
7	21 August 2019	Wilrijkse Plein, Antwerp, Belgium	Ireland	1–0	1–1	2019 EuroHockey Championship	
8	3 November 2019	Warsteiner HockeyPark, Mönchengladbach, Germany	Italy	7–0	7–0	2019 FIH Olympic Qualifiers	
9	4 December 2019	CeNARD, Buenos Aires, Argentina	Argentina	1–1	1–1	Test Match	
10	25 January 2020	PSO Club House, Stellenbosch, South Africa	Ireland	1–0	4–0	Test Match	
11	25 January 2020	PSO Club House, Stellenbosch, South Africa	Ireland	4–0	4–0	Test Match	
12	30 January 2020	PSO Club House, Stellenbosch, South Africa	South Africa	1–0	4–0	Test Match	
13	30 January 2020	PSO Club House, Stellenbosch, South Africa	South Africa	2–0	4–0	Test Match	
14	2 February 2020	PSO Club House, Stellenbosch, South Africa	South Africa	1–0	8–1	Test Match	
15	4 February 2020	PSO Club House, Stellenbosch, South Africa	South Africa	4–0	4–0	Test Match	
