= Sonja Zimmermann =

German field hockey player

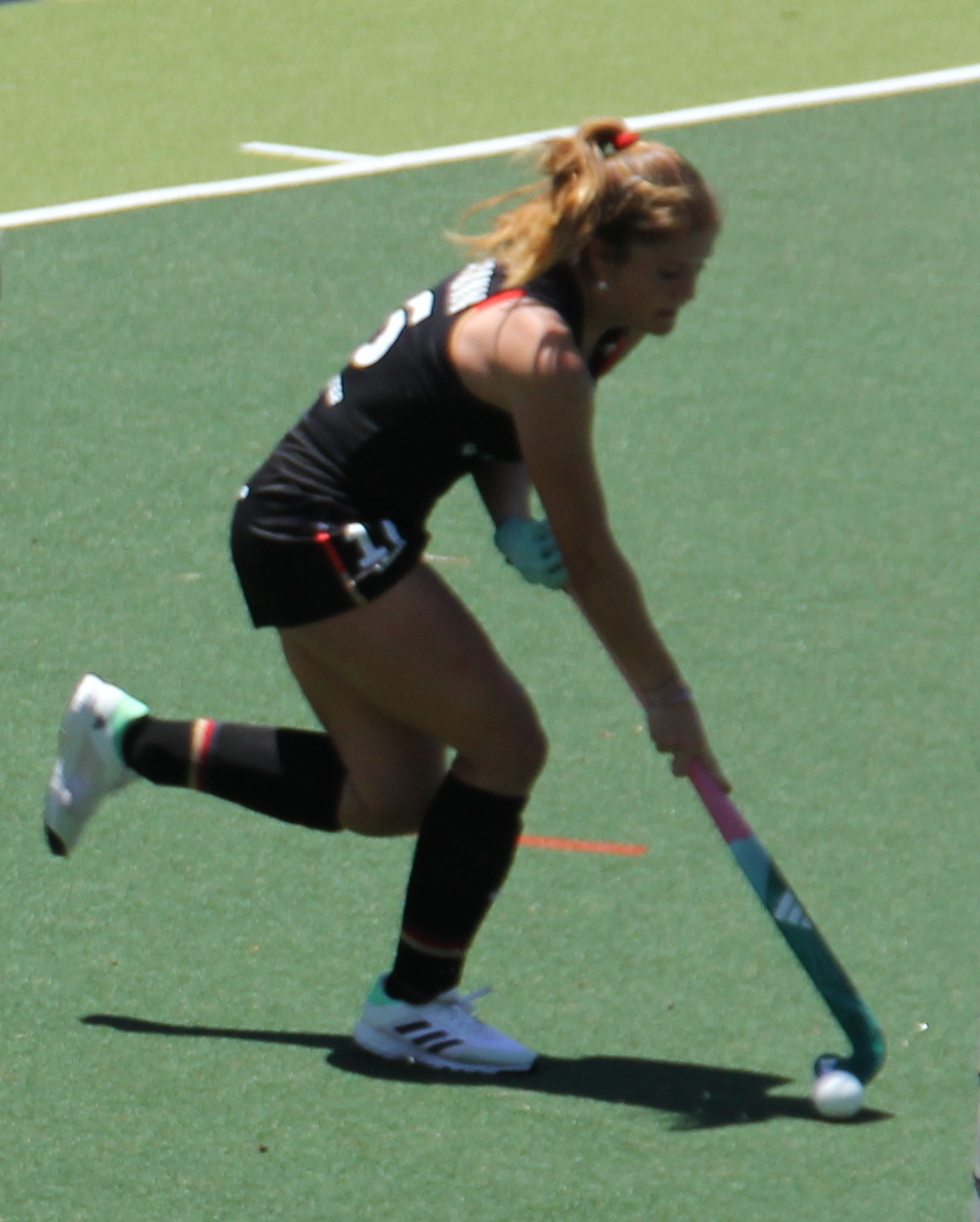
- Test field hockey: South Africa v Germany 26 November 2023

Personal information
- Born: 15 June 1999 (age 27) Grünstadt, Germany

Sport
- Sport: Field hockey
- Position: Defence
- Club: Mannheimer HC
National team
Years	Team	Caps	Goals
2015–2016	Germany U–18	10	(2)
2017–	Germany U–21	5	(0)
2019–	Germany	24	(0)
Medal record
Women's field hockey
Representing Germany
EuroHockey Nations Championship
Silver medal – second place	2019 Antwerp
Silver medal – second place	2021 Amstelveen
Silver medal – second place	2025 Mönchengladbach
Bronze medal – third place	2023 Mönchengladbach
FIH Pro League
Bronze medal – third place	2019 Amsterdam

Sonja Zimmermann (born 15 June 1999) is a German field hockey player, who plays as a defender.

== Career ==
=== Club hockey ===
In the German Bundesliga, Zimmermann plays club hockey for Mannheimer HC.

=== National teams ===
==== Under–18 ====
In 2015 and 2016, Zimmermann was a member of the German U–18 team at the EuroHockey Youth Championship in Santander and Cork respectively. At both tournaments, Germany finished in second place, earning Zimmermann silver medals on both occasions.

==== Under–21 ====
Zimmermann has only represented the German U–21 team on one occasion at the 2017 EuroHockey Junior Championship in Valenica, where the team finished in fourth place.

==== Die Danas ====
In 2019, Zimmermann made her debut for the German national team during the inaugural tournament of the FIH Pro League. The team eventually won a bronze medal at the Grand Final in Amsterdam, Netherlands. Zimmermann represented the team again in August at the EuroHockey Nations Championship in Antwerp, Belgium. At the tournament, Germany finished in second place, winning Zimmermann a silver medal.

In December 2019, Zimmermann was named in the preliminary German Olympic squad to train for the 2020 Summer Olympics in Tokyo, Japan.
