= Hanna Granitzki =

German field hockey player (born 1997)

Personal information
- Full name: Hanna Carina Granitzki
- Born: 31 July 1997 (age 29) Hamburg, Germany

Sport
- Sport: Field hockey
- Position: Defender
- Club: Club an der Alster
National team
Years	Team	Caps	Goals
2014–2016	Germany U–21	44	-
2017–	Germany	39	(3)
Medal record
Women's field hockey
Representing Germany
European Championship
Silver medal – second place	2019 Antwerp
Silver medal – second place	2021 Amstelveen
Silver medal – second place	2025 Mönchengladbach
Bronze medal – third place	2023 Mönchengladbach
FIH Pro League
Bronze medal – third place	2019 Amstelveen

Hanna Carina Granitzki (born 31 July 1997) is a German field hockey player.

== Career ==
=== Club hockey ===
Hanna Granitzki plays club hockey for Club an der Alster, based in Hamburg, Germany.

=== National teams ===
==== Junior ====
In 2016, Granitzki played in the Junior World Cup in Santiago, Chile, where the team finished 5th.

==== Senior ====
Granitzki made her senior international debut at the 2017 Four Nations Cup in Berlin.

Since her debut, Granitzki has been a regular inclusion in the German national side. Her most notable appearance for the team was during the inaugural FIH Pro League in 2019, where the team won bronze.

===== International goals =====
Goal	Date	Location	Opponent	Score	Result	Competition	Ref.
1	10 February 2019	Tasmanian Hockey Centre, Hobart, Australia	Australia	1–1	2–2 (1–3)	2019 FIH Pro League	
2	10 February 2019	Tasmanian Hockey Centre, Hobart, Australia	Australia	2–2	2–2 (1–3)	2019 FIH Pro League	
3	22 June 2019	Spooky Nook Sports, Lancaster, United States	United States	1–1	3–2	2019 FIH Pro League	
