= Rebecca Grote =

German field hockey player (born 1992)

Personal information
- Born: 6 August 1992 (age 33) Germany

Sport
- Sport: Field hockey
- Position: Midfielder
- Club: Rot-Weiss Köln
National team
Years	Team	Caps	Goals
2012–2013	Germany U–21	11	(3)
2019–	Germany	14	(9)
Medal record
Women's field hockey
Representing Germany
European Championship
Silver medal – second place	2019 Antwerp
FIH Pro League
Bronze medal – third place	2019 Amstelveen

Rebecca Grote (born 6 August 1992) is a German field hockey player, who plays as a midfielder.

== Career ==
=== Club Hockey ===
Grote currently plays her club hockey for Rot-Weiss Köln. During the 2017–18 season however, Grote relocated to Spain to play for Club de Campo in Madrid.

=== National Teams ===
==== Junior ====
In 2013, Grote was captain of the Germany U–21 side at the Junior World Cup in Mönchengladbach, Germany. Germany ultimately finished in tenth place, their worst performance at the tournament to date.

==== Senior ====
Grote made her senior International debut in 2019, during the inaugural FIH Pro League. Throughout the tournament, Grote scored 5 goals for the team, on the way to a bronze medal finish.

Following her performance in the FIH Pro League, Germany head coach Xavier Reckinger named Grote in the final squad for the 2019 EuroHockey Nations Championship in Antwerp, Belgium.

=== International Goals ===
Goal	Date	Location	Opponent	Score	Result	Competition	Ref.
1	22 February 2019	CeNARD, Buenos Aires, Argentina	Argentina	1–1	2–2	2019 FIH Pro League	
2	28 April 2019	Warsteiner HockeyPark, Mönchengladbach, Germany	China	4–1	4–1	2019 FIH Pro League	
3	2 June 2019	Wilrijkse Plein, Antwerp, Belgium	Belgium	3–0	4–0	2019 FIH Pro League	
4	22 June 2019	Spooky Nook Sports, Lancaster, United States	United States	3–1	3–2	2019 FIH Pro League	
5	27 June 2019	Wagener Stadium, Amstelveen, Netherlands	Netherlands	1–0	1–2	2019 FIH Pro League	
6	18 August 2019	Wilrijkse Plein, Antwerp, Belgium	Belarus	3–0	13–0	2019 EuroHockey Championships	
7	18 August 2019	Wilrijkse Plein, Antwerp, Belgium	Belarus	4–0	13–0	2019 EuroHockey Championships	
8	18 August 2019	Wilrijkse Plein, Antwerp, Belgium	Belarus	6–0	13–0	2019 EuroHockey Championships	
9	18 August 2019	Wilrijkse Plein, Antwerp, Belgium	Belarus	8–0	13–0	2019 EuroHockey Championships	
