= Amelie Wortmann =

German field hockey player (born 1996)

Personal information
- Born: 21 October 1996 (age 29) Hamburg, Germany
- Height: 1.72 m (5 ft 8 in)
- Weight: 68 kg (150 lb)

Sport
- Sport: Field hockey
- Position: Midfielder
- Club: Großflottbeker THGC
National team
| Years | Team | Caps | Goals |
| 2017– | Germany | 63 | (4) |
Medal record
EuroHockey Championship
| Silver medal – second place | 2019 Antwerp |
| Silver medal – second place | 2021 Amstelveen |
| Silver medal – second place | 2025 Mönchengladbach |
| Bronze medal – third place | 2023 Mönchengladbach |

Amelie Wortmann (born 21 October 1996) is a German field hockey player for the German national team.

She participated at the 2018 Women's Hockey World Cup.
