= Judith Vandermeiren =

Belgian field hockey player

Personal information
- Born: 10 August 1994 (age 32) Antwerp, Belgium
- Height: 1.74 m (5 ft 9 in)
- Weight: 63 kg (139 lb)

Sport
- Sport: Field hockey
- Position: Defender/Midfielder
- Club: Braxgata HC
National team
Years	Team	Caps	Goals
–	Belgium	135	-
Medal record
Women's field hockey
Representing Belgium
World Cup
Bronze medal – third place	2026 Wavre/Amstelveen
European Championships
Silver medal – second place	2017 Amstelveen
Silver medal – second place	2023 Mönchengladbach
Bronze medal – third place	2021 Amstelveen

Judith Vandermeiren (born 10 August 1994) is a Belgian field hockey player. At the 2012 Summer Olympics she competed with the Belgium women's national field hockey team in the women's tournament.
