= Linnea Gonzales =

American field hockey player

Personal information
- Born: August 15, 1997 (age 29) Bel Air, Maryland, U.S.
- Height: 5 ft 9 in (175 cm)

Sport
- Sport: Field hockey
- Position: Midfield/Forward
- Club: H2O Field Hockey
National team
Years	Team	Caps	Goals
2015–2017	United States U21	40	-
2019– current	United States	15	(2)
Medal record
Women's field hockey
Representing United States
Pan American Games
Bronze medal – third place	2019 Lima	Team

Linnea Gonzales (born August 15, 1997) is an American field hockey player.

== Personal life ==
Gonzales was born in Bel Air, Maryland. She originally played soccer, but began playing hockey after her sister started. One of her role models is former United States international, Katie Bam, who also uses an STX hockey stick.

Gonzales attended Patterson Mill High School to be close to her brother Landon, who chose the school for its program for autistic students.

She is a student at the University of Maryland.

== Career ==
=== Junior National Team ===
Gonzales represented the United States Under 21 side at the 2016 Junior World Cup. The team finished in eighth place.

=== Senior National Team ===
Gonzales made her senior international debut in 2019 during a test series against Chile in Santiago.

Since her debut, Gonzales has been a regular inclusion in the United States national squad, most recently appearing in the 2019 FIH Pro League.

==== International goals ====
Goal	Date	Location	Opponent	Score	Result	Competition	Ref.
1	April 10, 2019	Royal Uccle Sport, Brussels, Belgium	Belgium	1–1	1–2	2019 FIH Pro League	
2	May 18, 2019	Spooky Nook Sports, Lancaster, United States	China	3–0	3–1	2019 FIH Pro League	
