= Pauline Heinz =

German field hockey player

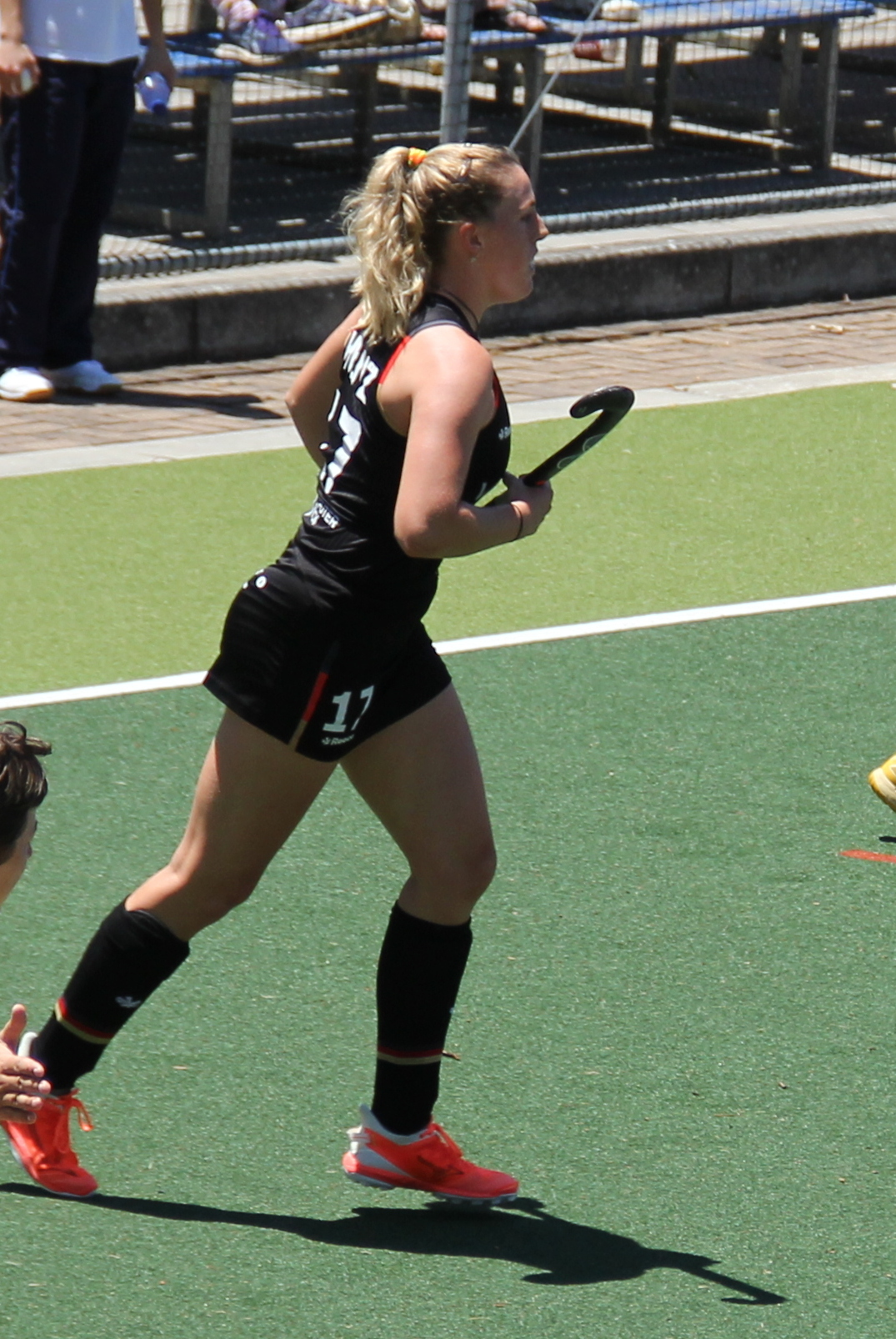
- Test field hockey: South Africa v Germany 26 November 2023

Personal information
- Born: 1 May 2001 (age 25) Wiesbaden, Germany

Sport
- Sport: Field hockey
- Position: Defence
- Club: Rüsselsheimer RK
National team
Years	Team	Caps	Goals
2018	Germany U–18	5	(2)
2017–	Germany U–21	46	(6)
2019–	Germany	2	(0)
Medal record
Women's field hockey
Representing Germany
EuroHockey Championship
Bronze medal – third place	2023 Mönchengladbach
EuroHockey Junior Championship
Bronze medal – third place	2019 Valencia

Pauline Heinz (born 1 May 2001) is a German field hockey player, who plays as a midfielder.

== Career ==
=== Club hockey ===
In the German Bundesliga, Heinz plays club hockey for Rüsselsheimer Ruder-Klub 08.

=== National teams ===
==== Under–18 ====
In 2018, Heinz was a member of the German U–18 team at the EuroHockey Youth Championship in Santander.

==== Under–21 ====
Heinz has a number of caps for the German U–21 team. Her most prominent appearance came at the 2019 EuroHockey Junior Championship in Valenica, where the team finished in third place.

==== Die Danas ====
In 2019, Heinz made her debut for the German national team during a test series against Argentina in Buenos Aires. In December 2019, Heinz was named in the preliminary German Olympic squad to train for the 2020 Summer Olympics in Tokyo.
