= Frédérique Matla =

Dutch field hockey player (born 1996)

Personal information
- Born: 28 December 1996 (age 29) Huizen, Netherlands

Sport
- Sport: Field hockey
- Position: Forward
- Club: Den Bosch
National team
Years	Team	Caps	Goals
2017–	Netherlands	111	(80)
Medal record
Women's field hockey
Representing Netherlands
Olympic Games
Gold medal – first place	2020 Tokyo	Team
Gold medal – first place	2024 Paris	Team
World Cup
Gold medal – first place	2018 London
Gold medal – first place	2022 Terrassa/Amstelveen
Silver medal – second place	2026 Wavre/Amstelveen
FIH Pro League
Gold medal – first place	2019 Amstelveen
EuroHockey Championships
Gold medal – first place	2017 Amstelveen
Gold medal – first place	2019 Antwerp
Gold medal – first place	2021 Amstelveen
Gold medal – first place	2023 Mönchengladbach
Gold medal – first place	2025 Mönchengladbach
Junior World Cup
Silver medal – second place	2016 Santiago

Frédérique Matla (born 28 December 1996) is a Dutch professional field hockey player who plays for the Netherlands women's national field hockey team.

At the 2016 Junior World Cup, Matla was part of the Netherlands under-21 national team that finished second, and she finished as top scorer for the tournament, with 12 goals.

She was also part of the 2020 Tokyo and 2024 Paris women's field hockey Olympic champion team.
