= Maike Schaunig =

German field hockey player

Personal information
- Born: 13 March 1996 (age 30)

Sport
- Sport: Field hockey
- Position: Defender
- Club: Uhlenhorst Mülheim
National team
Years	Team	Caps	Goals
2016–	Germany	19	(0)
Medal record
European Championship
Silver medal – second place	2021 Amstelveen

Maike Schaunig (born 13 March 1996) is a German field hockey player for the German national team.

She participated at the 2018 Women's Hockey World Cup.
