= Anne Schröder =

German field hockey player

Personal information
- Born: 11 September 1994 (age 31) Düsseldorf, Germany
- Height: 1.70 m (5 ft 7 in)
- Weight: 58 kg (128 lb)

Sport
- Sport: Field hockey
- Position: Midfielder
- Club: Club an der Alster
National team
Years	Team	Caps	Goals
2013–	Germany	157	(8)
Medal record
Women's field hockey
Representing Germany
Olympic Games
Bronze medal – third place	2016 Rio	Team
EuroHockey Championship
Silver medal – second place	2019 Antwerp
Silver medal – second place	2021 Amstelveen
Bronze medal – third place	2023 Mönchengladbach
Indoor World Cup
Gold medal – first place	2018 Berlin

Anne Schröder (also spelled Schroeder; born 11 September 1994) is a German field hockey player. She represented her country at the 2016 Summer Olympics and 2020 Summer Olympics.
