= Sophie Murphy =

Australian field hockey player

Personal information
- Born: 12 September 1995 (age 31) Camberwell, Victoria

Sport
- Sport: Field hockey
- Position: Defender
Senior career
| Years | Team | Caps | Goals |
| 2014–2018 | Victorian Vipers | 32 | 3 |
| 2019– | HC Melbourne | 16 | 2 |
National team
| Years | Team | Caps | Goals |
| 2018– | Australia | 46 | (2) |
Medal record
Women's field hockey
Representing Australia
FIH Pro League
| Silver medal – second place | 2019 Amstelveen |
Oceania Cup
| Silver medal – second place | 2019 Rockhampton |
Junior World Cup
| Bronze medal – third place | 2016 Santiago |

Sophie Murphy (née Taylor, born 12 September 1995) is an Australian field hockey player.

== Personal life ==
Murphy was born in Camberwell, Victoria, and plays representative hockey for the Victorian Vipers.

== Career ==
=== Junior national team ===
Murphy made her debut for the junior national team at the 2016 Junior Oceania Cup, helping the team to qualify for the Junior World Cup. She was also part of the squad that won bronze at the 2016 Hockey Junior World Cup in Chile.

=== Senior national team ===
She made her international debut at the 2018 Sompo Cup in Ibaraki, Japan.

As of May 2018, Murphy is a member of the Australian women's national development squad.
