= Elisa Gräve =

German field hockey player

Personal information
- Born: 18 October 1996 (age 29)

Sport
- Sport: Field hockey
- Position: Midfielder
- Club: Düsseldorfer HC
National team
| Years | Team | Caps | Goals |
| 2014– | Germany | 45 | (2) |
Medal record
European Championship
| Silver medal – second place | 2019 Antwerp |

Elisa Gräve (born 18 October 1996) is a German field hockey player for the German national team.

She participated at the 2018 Women's Hockey World Cup.
