= Yong Jing =

Chinese field hockey player

Personal information
- Born: 9 January 1994 (age 32)

Sport
- Sport: Field hockey
National team
Years	Team	Caps	Goals
–	China	23	-
Medal record
Women's field hockey
Representing China
Asian Champions Trophy
Bronze medal – third place	2018 Donghae

Yong Jing (born 9 January 1994) is a Chinese field hockey player for the Chinese national team.

She participated at the 2018 Women's Hockey World Cup.
