= Wilrijkse Plein Antwerp =

Coordinates: 51°11′18″N 4°23′49″E

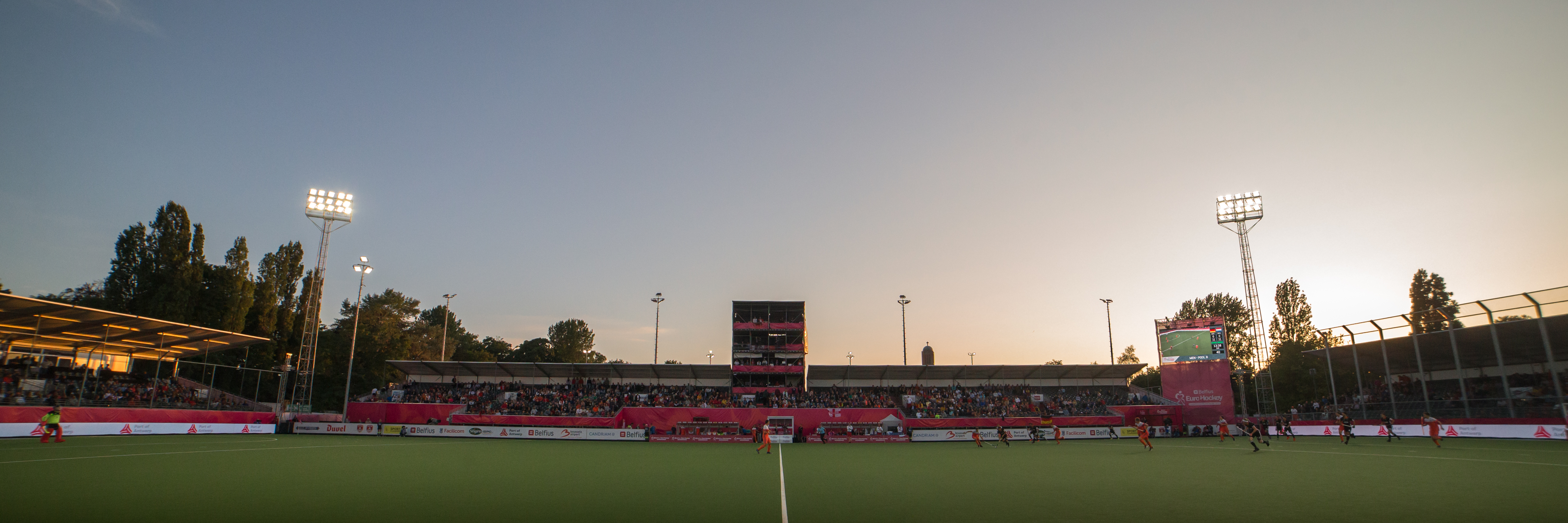
European field hockey championship stadium in Antwerp, Belgium 2019

Wilrijkse Plein Antwerp is a sports and leisure venue located in Antwerp, in Belgium. It is currently mainly used for field hockey matches and matches organized for Men's and Women's Euros. The stadium accommodates more or less 7,000 people.

Its location is Vogelzanglaan 6 at Wilrijk in the province of Antwerp.

It was in 2013 that the stadium was built.

On 24 June 2021 the Center of Excellence was officially inaugurated by the VHL (Vlaamse Hockey Liga) in collaboration with Sport Vlaanderen and the city of Antwerp.

In the past, the stadium has hosted the following major tournaments:

- Men's and Women's Euros in 2019
