= Anne-Sophie Weyns =

Belgian field hockey player

Personal information
- Born: 2 February 1995 (age 31)

Sport
- Sport: Field hockey
- Position: Midfielder/Forward
- Club: Royal Victory Hockey Club
National team
Years	Team	Caps	Goals
–	Belgium	66	-

Anne-Sophie Weyns (born 2 February 1995) is a Belgian field hockey player for the Belgian national team.

She participated at the 2018 Women's Hockey World Cup.

She's been in numerous events since then, latest being the 2021 Women's EuroHockey Championship.
