= Charlotte Stapenhorst =

German field hockey player

Personal information
- Born: 15 June 1995 (age 31) Berlin, Germany
- Height: 1.68 m (5 ft 6 in)
- Weight: 68 kg (150 lb)

Sport
- Sport: Field hockey
- Position: Forward
- Club: Amsterdam HC
National team
Years	Team	Caps	Goals
2013–	Germany	86	(23)
Medal record
Olympic Games
Bronze medal – third place	2016 Rio de Janeiro	Team
European Championship
Silver medal – second place	2021 Amstelveen
Bronze medal – third place	2023 Mönchengladbach

Charlotte Stapenhorst (born 15 June 1995) is a German field hockey player. She represented her country at the 2016, 2020 and 2024 Summer Olympics.
