= Chen Yi (field hockey, born 1998) =

Chinese field hockey player

Personal information
- Born: 2 September 1998 (age 27)
- Height: 1.74 m (5 ft 9 in)
- Weight: 63 kg (139 lb)

Sport
- Sport: Field hockey
- Position: Goalkeeper
National team
Years	Team	Caps	Goals
2017–	China	10	(0)
Medal record
Women's field hockey
Representing China
Asia Cup
Silver medal – second place	2017 Gifu	Team
Asian Champions Trophy
Bronze medal – third place	2018 Donghae

Chen Yi (born 2 September 1998) is a Chinese field hockey player for the Chinese national team.

She participated at the 2018 Women's Hockey World Cup.
