= Michelle Struijk =

Belgian field hockey player

Personal information
- Born: 24 June 1998 (age 28)

Sport
- Sport: Field hockey
- Position: Midfielder/Forward
- Club: Royal Antwerp Hockey Club
National team
Years	Team	Caps	Goals
–	Belgium	103	(9)
Medal record
World Cup
Bronze medal – third place	2026 Wavre/Amstelveen
EuroHockey Championship
Silver medal – second place	2023 Mönchengladbach
Bronze medal – third place	2021 Amstelveen

Michelle Struijk (born 24 June 1998) is a Belgian field hockey player for the Belgian national team.

She participated at the 2018 Women's Hockey World Cup.
