= 2023 Women's EuroHockey Championship =

International field hockey competition

Tournament details
- Host country: Germany
- City: Mönchengladbach
- Dates: 18–26 August
- Teams: 8 (from 1 confederation)
- Venue: Warsteiner HockeyPark

Final positions
- Champions: Netherlands (12th title)
- Runner-up: Belgium
- Third place: Germany

Tournament statistics
- Matches played: 20
- Goals scored: 79 (3.95 per match)
- Top scorer: (Netherlands) Yibbi Jansen (7 goals)
- Best player: (Belgium) Charlotte Englebert
- Best young player: (Belgium) Emily White
- Best goalkeeper: (Italy) Lucia Caruso

The 2023 Women's EuroHockey Championship was the sixteenth edition of the Women's EuroHockey Championship, the biennial international women's field hockey championship of Europe organised by the European Hockey Federation.

The tournament was held alongside the men's tournament from 18 to 26 August 2023 at the Hockeypark, in Mönchengladbach, Germany.

The Netherlands, as the winner, qualified for the 2024 Summer Olympics, while the other teams aside from Scotland will have a second chance in the 2024 Women's FIH Hockey Olympic Qualifiers. The six best teams qualified directly for the 2025 edition, while the seventh and eighth place teams will play in the 2024 EuroHockey Championship qualifiers. In the final the Netherlands defeated Belgium to capture their twelfth title.

== Qualification ==
Along with the host nation Germany, the top three teams at the 2021 EuroHockey Championship and the four winners of the 2022 EuroHockey Championship Qualifiers fielded the women's tournament.

| Qualification | Date | Host | Berths | Qualified team |
|---|---|---|---|---|
| Host nation | 14 December 2020 | —N/a | 1 | Germany |
| 2021 EuroHockey Championship | 5–13 June 2021 | (Netherlands) Amstelveen | 3 | Netherlands; Belgium; Spain |
| EuroHockey Championship Qualifiers | 17–20 August 2022 | (Lithuania) Vilnius | 1 | Italy |
| EuroHockey Championship Qualifiers | 18–21 August 2022 | (Republic of Ireland) Dublin | 1 | Ireland |
| EuroHockey Championship Qualifiers | 24–27 August 2022 | (France) Dunkirk | 1 | Scotland |
| EuroHockey Championship Qualifiers | 25–28 August 2022 | (England) Durham | 1 | England |
| Total | | | 8 | |

== Preliminary round ==
All times are local (UTC+2).

=== Pool A ===
| Pos | Team | Pld | W | D | L | GF | GA | GD | Pts | Qualification |
|---|---|---|---|---|---|---|---|---|---|---|
| 1 | Netherlands | 3 | 3 | 0 | 0 | 12 | 1 | +11 | 9 | Semi-finals |
| 2 | Belgium | 3 | 2 | 0 | 1 | 11 | 2 | +9 | 6 | Semi-finals |
| 3 | Spain | 3 | 1 | 0 | 2 | 3 | 10 | −7 | 3 | |
| 4 | Italy | 3 | 0 | 0 | 3 | 0 | 13 | −13 | 0 | |

Source: FIH
Rules for classification: 1) points; 2) matches won; 3) goal difference; 4) goals for; 5) head-to-head result; 6) field goals for.

19 August 2023
11:00

| Belgium | 6–0 | Italy |
|---|---|---|
| Struijk 12'; Raye 24'; Englebert 49', 57'; Puvrez 53'; Vanden Borre 58' | Report |

Umpires:
Dan Barstow (ENG)
Lisette Baljon (NED)

19 August 2023
13:15

| Netherlands | 5–1 | Spain |
|---|---|---|
| Jansen 3', 17', 54'; Matla 18'; Dicke 27' | Report | Iglesias 27' |

Umpires:
Michelle Meister (GER)
Michael Dutrieux (BEL)

20 August 2023
15:00

| Belgium | 0–2 | Netherlands |
|---|---|---|
| | Report | Albers 26'; Matla 56' |

Umpires:
Hannah Harrison (ENG)
Antonio Ilgrande (ITA)

20 August 2023
19:45

| Spain | 2–0 | Italy |
|---|---|---|
| Torres-Quevedo 14', 29' | Report |

Umpires:
Rachael Williams (ENG)
Michael Gholami-Eilmer (AUT)

22 August 2023
14:45

| Netherlands | 5–0 | Italy |
|---|---|---|
| Matla 16'; Jansen 18'; Dicke 24', 45'; Veen 34' | Report |

Umpires:
Céline Martin-Schmets (BEL)
Gema Calderón (ESP)

22 August 2023
17:00

| Spain | 0–5 | Belgium |
|---|---|---|
| | Report | Vanden Borre 3', 59'; Englebert 33', 57'; Rasir 47' |

Umpires:
Sarah Wilson (SCO)
Alison Keogh (IRE)

=== Pool B ===
| Pos | Team | Pld | W | D | L | GF | GA | GD | Pts | Qualification |
|---|---|---|---|---|---|---|---|---|---|---|
| 1 | Germany (H) | 3 | 3 | 0 | 0 | 14 | 0 | +14 | 9 | Semi-finals |
| 2 | England | 3 | 2 | 0 | 1 | 8 | 5 | +3 | 6 | Semi-finals |
| 3 | Ireland | 3 | 1 | 0 | 2 | 5 | 8 | −3 | 3 | |
| 4 | Scotland | 3 | 0 | 0 | 3 | 0 | 14 | −14 | 0 | |

Source: FIH
Rules for classification: 1) points; 2) matches won; 3) goal difference; 4) goals for; 5) head-to-head result; 6) field goals for.
(H) Hosts

18 August 2023
17:00

| England | 3–0 | Ireland |
|---|---|---|
| Balsdon 8'; Howard 21'; Martin 48' | Report |

Umpires:
Jakub Mejzlík (CZE)
Gema Calderón (ESP)

18 August 2023
19:30

| Germany | 4–0 | Scotland |
|---|---|---|
| Zimmermann 1', 30+'; Nolte 12'; Stapenhorst 53' | Report |

Umpires:
Hannah Harrison (ENG)
Antonio Ilgrande (ITA)

19 August 2023
20:15

| Ireland | 5–0 | Scotland |
|---|---|---|
| McLoughlin 19'; Curran 20'; N. Carey 26'; Torrans 55', 60' | Report |

Umpires:
Céline Martin-Schmets (BEL)
Jonas van 't Hek (NED)

20 August 2023
17:30

| Germany | 5–0 | England |
|---|---|---|
| Micheel 38'; Zimmermann 41'; Fleschütz 46', 59'; Heinz 49' | Report |

Umpires:
Laurine Delforge (BEL)
Alison Keogh (IRE)

22 August 2023
12:30

| England | 5–0 | Scotland |
|---|---|---|
| Howard 16', 52', 57'; Balsdon 29', 44' | Report |

Umpires:
Michelle Meister (GER)
Ben Göntgen (GER)

22 August 2023
19:30

| Ireland | 0–5 | Germany |
|---|---|---|
| | Report | Zimmermann 7'; Heinz 23'; Lorenz 51', 52'; Fleschütz 53' |

Umpires:
Rachel Williams (ENG)
Lisette Baljon (NED)

== Fifth to eighth place classification ==
The points obtained in the preliminary round against the other team were carried over.

| Pos | Team | Pld | W | D | L | GF | GA | GD | Pts |
|---|---|---|---|---|---|---|---|---|---|
| 5 | Ireland | 3 | 1 | 2 | 0 | 8 | 3 | +5 | 5 |
| 6 | Spain | 3 | 1 | 1 | 1 | 5 | 4 | +1 | 4 |
| 7 | Scotland | 3 | 1 | 1 | 1 | 3 | 7 | −4 | 4 |
| 8 | Italy | 3 | 0 | 2 | 1 | 2 | 4 | −2 | 2 |

Source: FIH
Rules for classification: 1) points; 2) matches won; 3) goal difference; 4) goals for; 5) head-to-head result; 6) field goals for.

24 August 2023
12:30

| Italy | 1–1 | Scotland |
|---|---|---|
| Munitis 26' | Report | Costello 27' |

Umpires:
Gema Calderón (ESP)
Michelle Meister (GER)

24 August 2023
14:45

| Spain | 2–2 | Ireland |
|---|---|---|
| Mejias 33'; Iglesias 38' | Report | McAuley 14'; Upton 49' |

Umpires:
Michael Gholami-Eilmer (AUT)
Lisette Baljon (NED)

25 August 2023
16:30

| Spain | 1–2 | Scotland |
|---|---|---|
| Jiménez Vicente 47' | Report | Costello 15'; C. Wilson 32' |

Umpires:
Hannah Harrison (ENG)
Lisette Baljon (NED)

26 August 2023
10:00

| Ireland | 1–1 | Italy |
|---|---|---|
| Carroll 48' | Report | Laurito 35' |

Umpires:
Céline Martin-Schmets (BEL)
Michelle Meister (GER)

== First to fourth place classification ==
=== Bracket ===
Semi-finals
24 August
Netherlands | 7
England | 0
24 August
Germany | 0
Belgium | 1

Final
26 August
Netherlands | 3
Belgium | 1
Third place
26 August
England | 0
Germany | 3

=== Semi-finals ===
24 August 2023
17:00

| Netherlands | 7–0 | England |
|---|---|---|
| Jansen 33', 42', 58'; Dicke 35'; Matla 45', 59'; Veen 47' | Report |

Umpires:
Laurine Delforge (BEL)
Jakub Mejzlík (CZE)

24 August 2023
20:00

| Germany | 0–1 | Belgium |
|---|---|---|
| | Report | White 2' |

Umpires:
Hannah Harrison (ENG)
Rachael Williams (ENG)

=== Third and fourth place ===
26 August 2023
12:15

| England | 0–3 | Germany |
|---|---|---|
| | Report | Zimmermann 12'; Stapenhorst 26'; Fleschütz 58' |

Umpires:
Laurine Delforge (BEL)
Gema Calderón (ESP)

=== Final ===
26 August 2023
14:45

| Netherlands | 3–1 | Belgium |
|---|---|---|
| Veen 2'; Moes 5'; Burg 26' | Report | Raye 23' |

Umpires:
Alison Keogh (IRE)
Martin Madden (SCO)

== Statistics and awards ==
=== Final standings ===
| Pos | Team | Qualification |
|---|---|---|
| 1st place, gold medalist(s) | Netherlands | 2024 Summer Olympics |
| 2nd place, silver medalist(s) | Belgium | 2024 FIH Hockey Olympic Qualifiers |
| 3rd place, bronze medalist(s) | Germany (H) | 2024 FIH Hockey Olympic Qualifiers |
| 4 | England (Note: England qualified the Great Britain team for the Olympic Qualifiers) | 2024 FIH Hockey Olympic Qualifiers |
| 5 | Ireland | 2024 FIH Hockey Olympic Qualifiers |
| 6 | Spain | 2024 FIH Hockey Olympic Qualifiers |
| 7 | Scotland (Note: As England already qualified Great Britain for the Olympic Qualifiers, Scotland berth was passed to the next ranked team.) | |
| 8 | Italy | 2024 FIH Hockey Olympic Qualifiers |

Source: FIH
(H) Host

=== Goalscorers ===
There were 79 goals scored in 20 matches, for an average of 3.95 goals per match.

7 goals

- (Netherlands) Yibbi Jansen

5 goals

- (Germany) Sonja Zimmermann
- (Netherlands) Frédérique Matla

4 goals

- (Belgium) Charlotte Englebert
- (England) Tessa Howard
- (Netherlands) Pien Dicke

3 goals

- (Belgium) Stéphanie Vanden Borre
- (England) Grace Balsdon
- (Germany) Jette Fleschütz
- (Netherlands) Marijn Veen

2 goals

- (Belgium) Abigail Raye
- (Germany) Pauline Heinz
- (Germany) Nike Lorenz
- (Germany) Charlotte Stapenhorst
- (Ireland) Sarah Torrans
- (Scotland) Amy Costello
- (Spain) Belén Iglesias
- (Spain) Alejandra Torres-Quevedo

1 goal

- (Belgium) Emma Puvrez
- (Belgium) Justine Rasir
- (Belgium) Michelle Struijk
- (Belgium) Emily White
- (England) Hannah Martin
- (Germany) Jette Fleschütz
- (Germany) Lena Micheel
- (Germany) Lisa Nolte
- (Ireland) Naomi Carroll
- (Ireland) Niamh Carey
- (Ireland) Ellen Curran
- (Ireland) Sarah McAuley
- (Ireland) Hannah McLoughlin
- (Ireland) Roisin Upton
- (Italy) Sofia Laurito
- (Italy) Emilia Munitis
- (Scotland) Charlotte Watson
- (Netherlands) Felice Albers
- (Netherlands) Joosje Burg
- (Netherlands) Freeke Moes
- (Spain) Lucía Jiménez Vicente
- (Spain) Candela Mejias

Source: FIH

=== Awards ===
The following awards were given at the conclusion of the tournament.

| Award | Player |
|---|---|
| Player of the tournament | (Belgium) Charlotte Englebert |
| Top goalscorer | (Netherlands) Yibbi Jansen |
| Goalkeeper of the tournament | (Italy) Lucia Caruso |
| Young player of the tournament | (Belgium) Emily White |

== See also ==
- 2023 Men's EuroHockey Championship
- 2023 Women's EuroHockey Championship II
