= Nike Lorenz =

German field hockey player

Personal information
- Born: 12 March 1997 (age 29) Berlin, Germany
- Height: 1.70 m (5 ft 7 in)
- Weight: 69 kg (152 lb)

Sport
- Sport: Field hockey
- Position: Defender
- Club: Nottingham University
National team
Years	Team	Caps	Goals
2014–	Germany	120	(33)
Medal record
Olympic Games
Bronze medal – third place	2016 Rio de Janeiro	Team
EuroHockey Championship
Silver medal – second place	2019 Antwerp
Silver medal – second place	2021 Amstelveen
Bronze medal – third place	2023 Mönchengladbach
Indoor World Cup
Gold medal – first place	2018 Berlin

Nike Lorenz (born 12 March 1997) is a German field hockey player. She represented her country at the 2016 Summer Olympics. In December 2019, she was nominated for the FIH Rising Star of the Year Award.
