= Lena Micheel =

German field hockey player

Personal information
- Born: 29 April 1998 (age 28) Berlin, Germany

Sport
- Sport: Field hockey
- Position: Forward
- Club: UHC Hamburg
National team
Years	Team	Caps	Goals
2018–	Germany	62	(13)
Medal record
EuroHockey Championship
Silver medal – second place	2019 Antwerp
Silver medal – second place	2021 Amstelveen
Silver medal – second place	2025 Mönchengladbach
Bronze medal – third place	2023 Mönchengladbach

Lena Micheel (born 29 April 1998) is a German field hockey player for the German national team.

She participated at the 2018 Women's Hockey World Cup.
