= Warsteiner HockeyPark =

Multi-use stadium in Mönchengladbach, Germany

Coordinates: 51°10′40″N 6°23′24″E

SparkassenPark
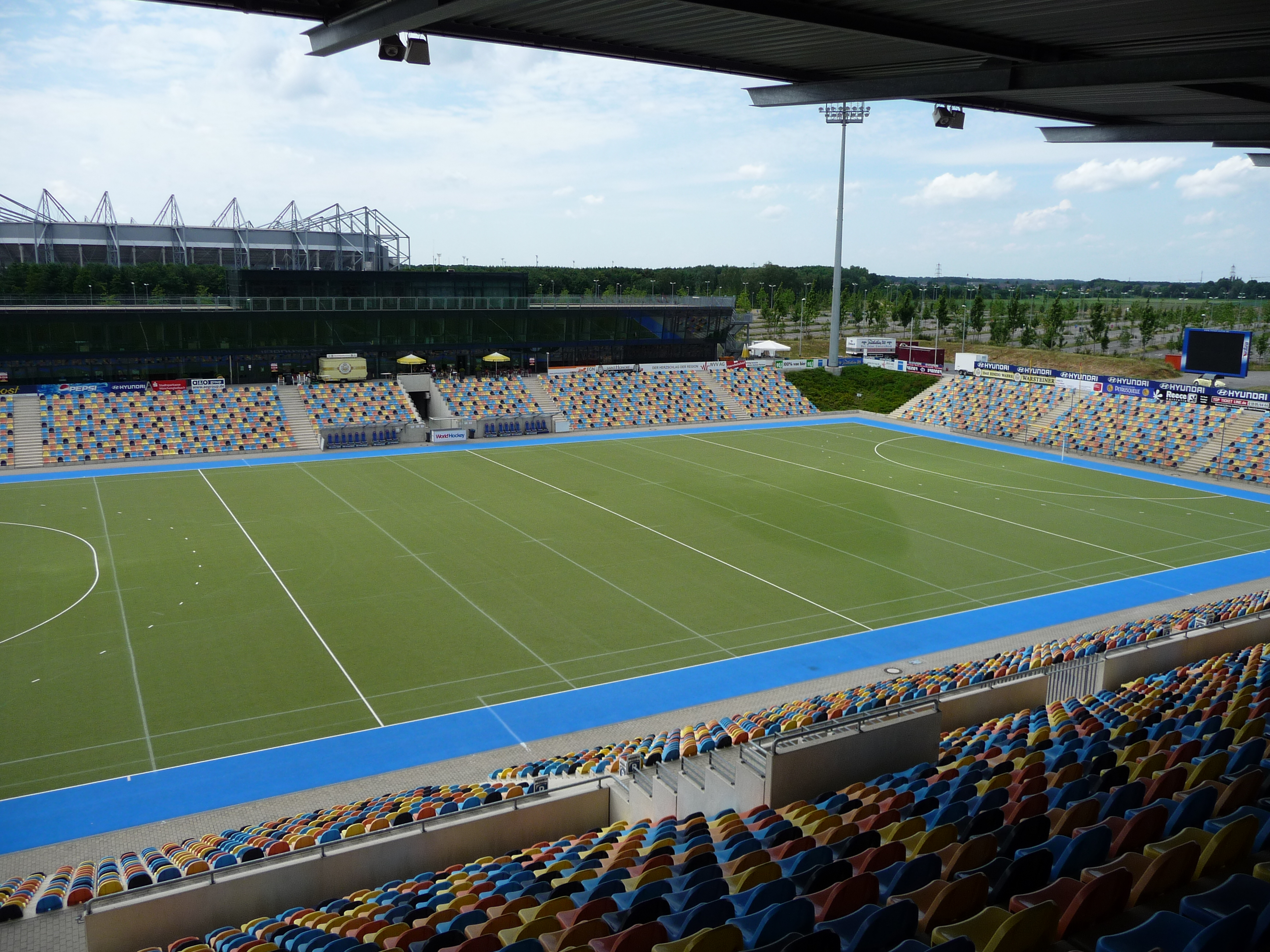
- Interactive map of SparkassenPark
- Location: Mönchengladbach, North Rhine-Westphalia, Germany
- Capacity: 9,000 (Field hockey); 21,000 (concerts)
- Surface: Sintetic

Construction
- Opened: 2005

Tenant
- Mönchengladbach Mavericks (GFL) (2005-present)

The SparkassenPark is a multi-use stadium in Mönchengladbach, Germany. It is currently used mostly for American football and field hockey matches and hosted the 2006 Men's Hockey World Cup, the 2008 Women's Hockey Champions Trophy, the 2010 Men's Hockey Champions Trophy and the 2013 Women's Hockey Junior World Cup . The stadium is run by former German field hockey international Michael Hilgers. It is also used by the American football team Mönchengladbach Mavericks.

== Concerts ==
Concerts held at the Warsteiner HockeyPark
Date	Artists	Events	Attendance	Revenue
May 15, 2011	Shakira	The Sun Comes Out World Tour	11,600 / 12,000	—N/a
June 8, 2012	Guns N' Roses	Up Close and Personal Tour	—N/a	—N/a
June 8, 2012	Leonard Cohen	Old Ideas World Tour	6,746 / 6,746	$523,841
June 25, 2014	Thirty Seconds to Mars	Love, Lust, Faith and Dreams Tour	—N/a	—N/a
July 20, 2014	Elton John	Follow the Yellow Brick Road Tour	—N/a	—N/a
August 29, 2014	Avicii	True Tour	13,600 / 20,800	$1,005,610
July 7, 2015	Sting	Summer 2015 Tour	—N/a	—N/a
June 6, 2018	Nickelback	Feed The Machine Tour	—N/a	—N/a
July 8, 2018	Deep Purple	The Long Goodbye Tour	—N/a	—N/a
August 13, 2018	Britney Spears	Britney Spears: Piece of Me Tour	15,208 / 15,208	$1,167,490
May 25, 2023	Mötley Crüe & Def Leppard	The World Tour		
June 30, 2024	Take That	This Life on Tour		

== Gallery ==
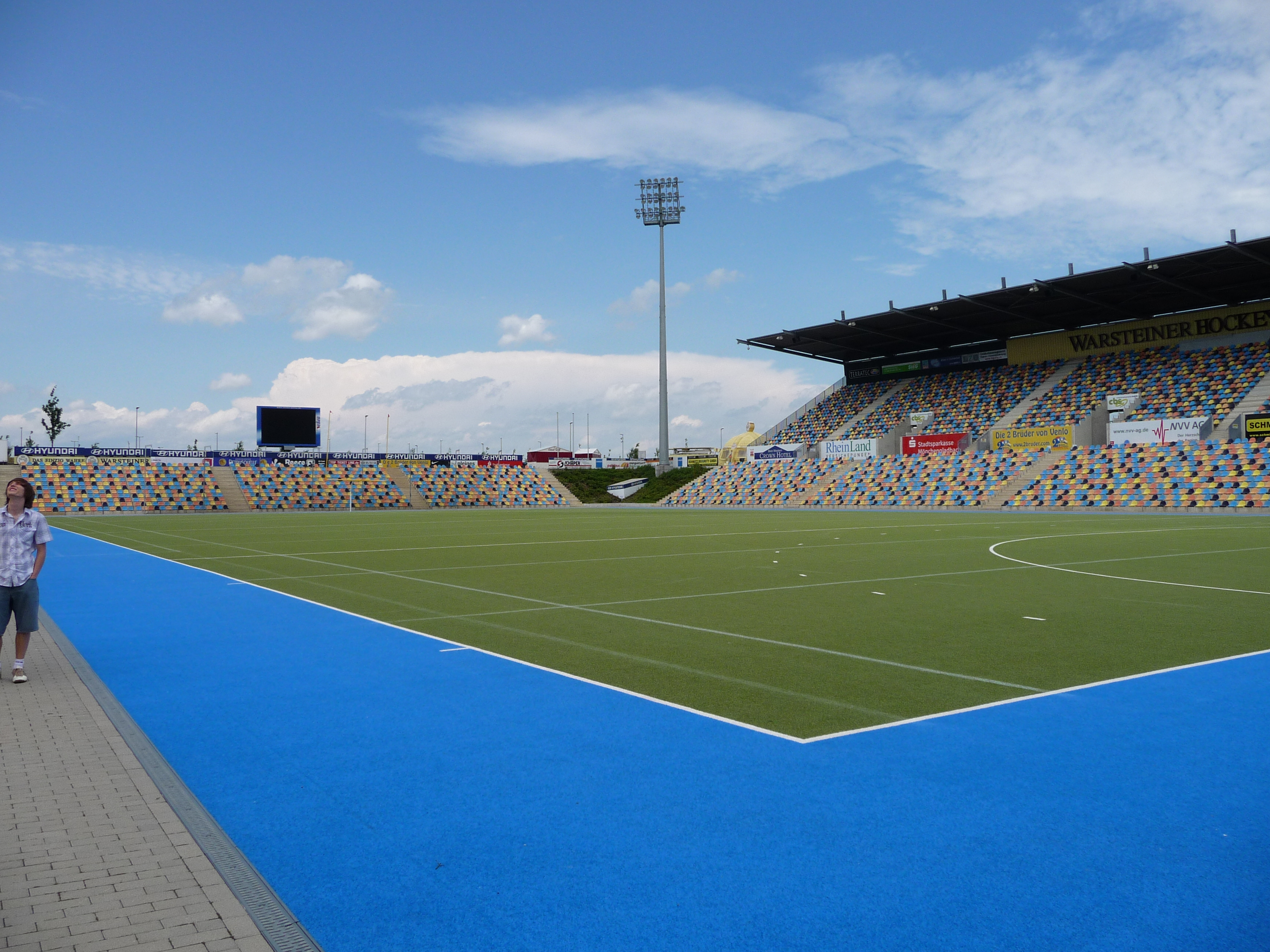
Warsteiner HockeyPark

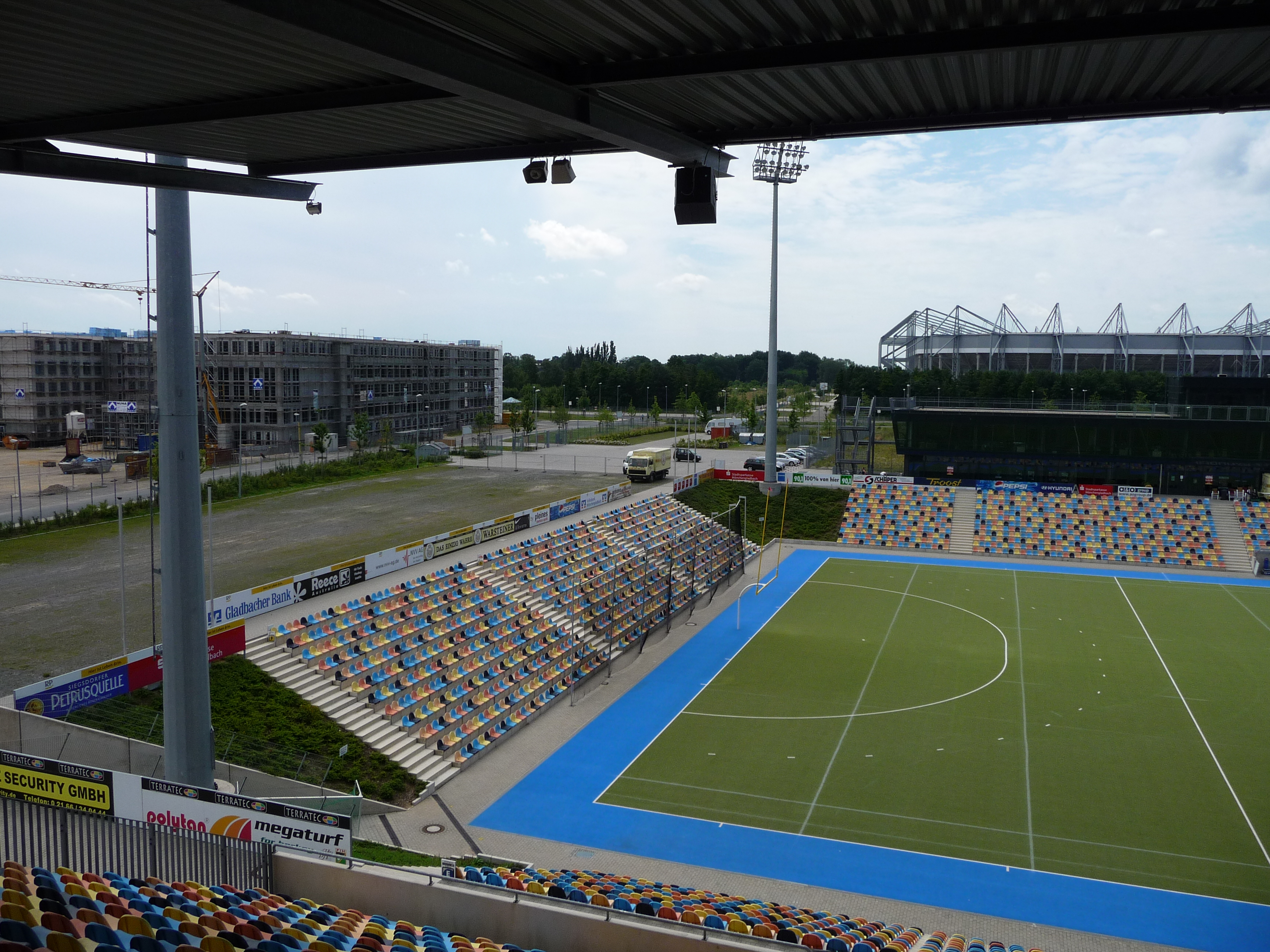
Warsteiner HockeyPark

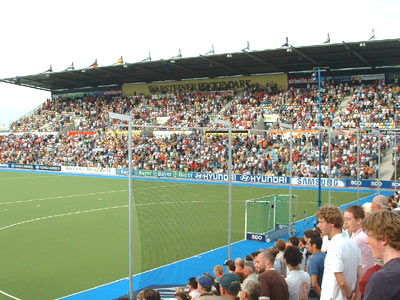
Warsteiner HockeyPark

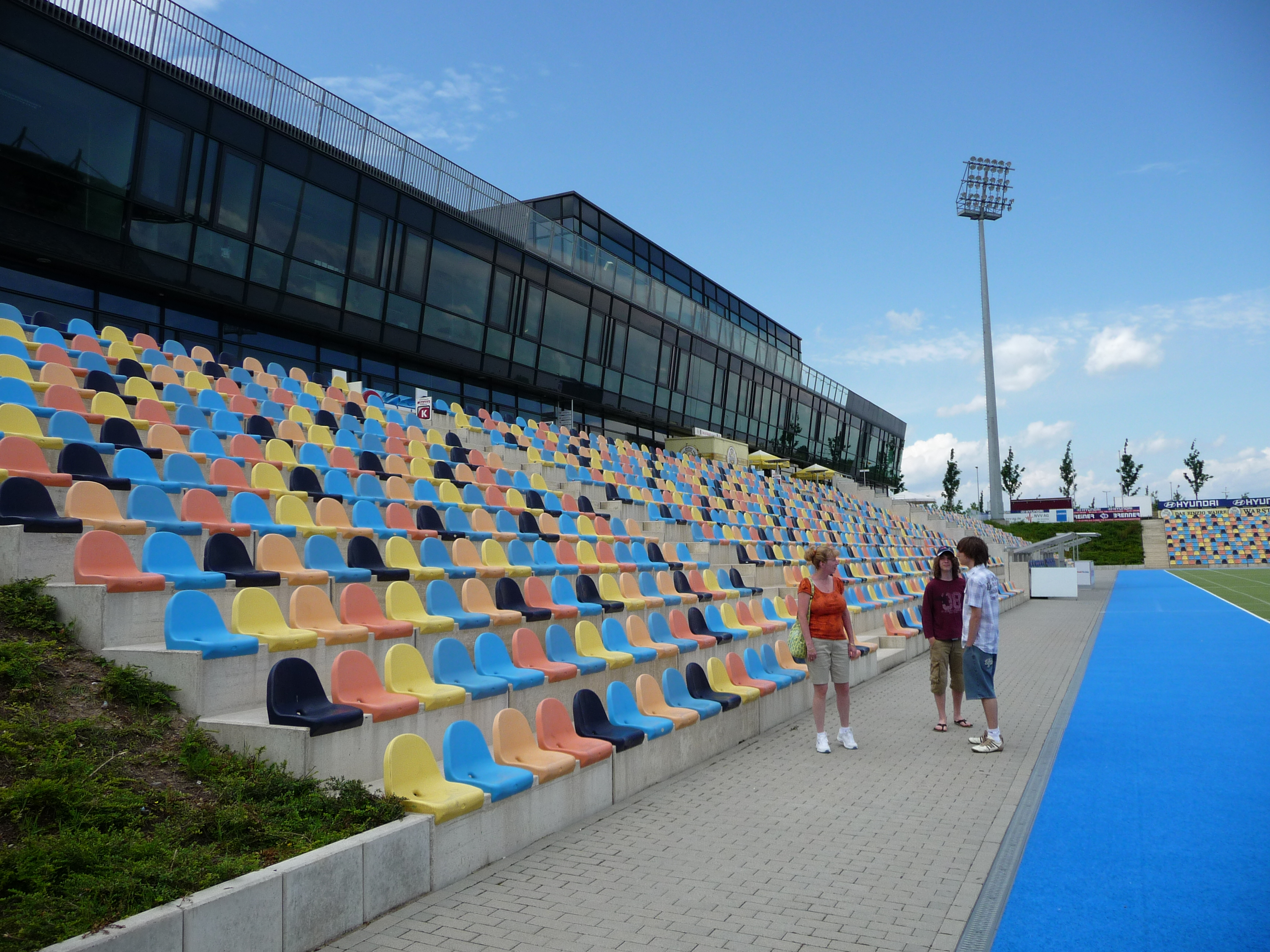
Warsteiner HockeyPark

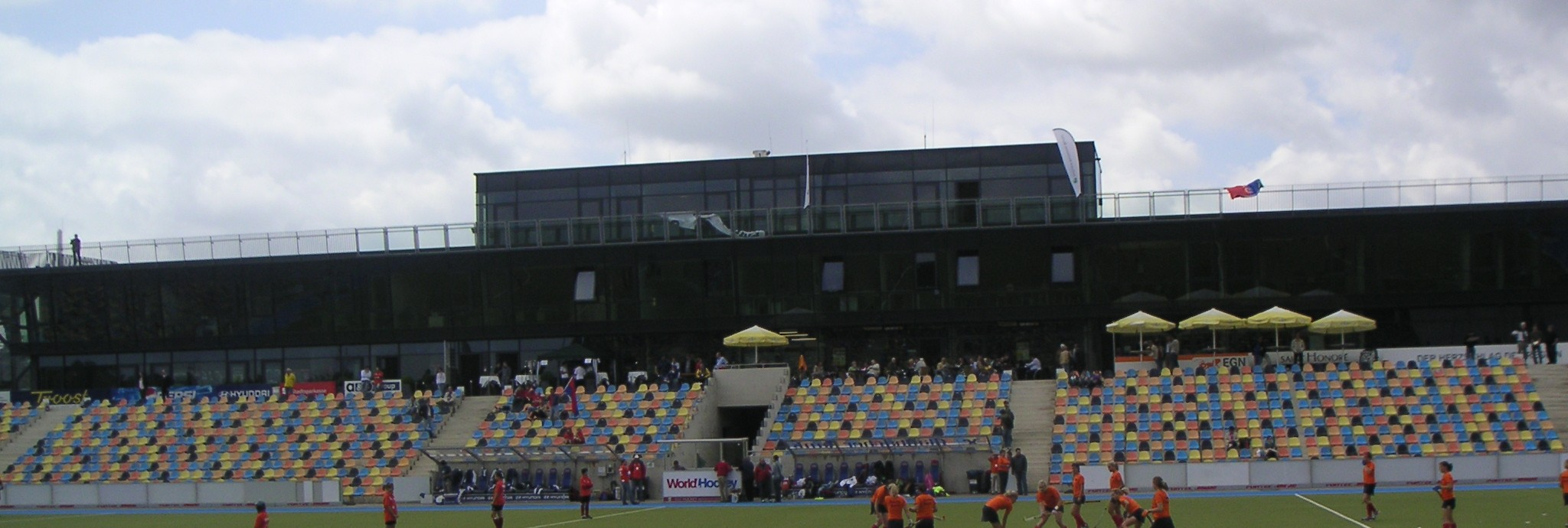
Warsteiner HockeyPark

Preceded by Malaysia National Hockey Stadium; Kuala Lumpur	International Hockey Federation; Hockey World Cup; 2006	Succeeded by Dhyan Chand National Stadium; New Delhi
Preceded by State Netball and Hockey Centre; Melbourne	International Hockey Federation; Hockey Champions Trophy; 2010	Succeeded by North Harbour Hockey Stadium; Auckland
Preceded by Wagener Stadium; Amstelveen	European Hockey Federation; EuroHockey Nations Championship; 2011	Succeeded by TBD; TBD
