= 2019 Women's EuroHockey Championship =

International field hockey competition

Tournament details
- Host country: Belgium
- City: Antwerp
- Dates: 17–25 August
- Teams: 8 (from 1 confederation)
- Venue: Wilrijkse Plein

Final positions
- Champions: Netherlands (10th title)
- Runner-up: Germany
- Third place: Spain

Tournament statistics
- Matches played: 20
- Goals scored: 97 (4.85 per match)
- Top scorer(s): (Netherlands) Caia van Maasakker (Netherlands) Lidewij Welten (5 goals)
- Best player: (Spain) Georgina Oliva

The 2019 Women's EuroHockey Championship was the 14th edition of the Women's EuroHockey Nations Championship, the biennial international women's field hockey championship of Europe organised by the European Hockey Federation.

It was held alongside the men's tournament from 17 to 25 August 2019 in Antwerp, Belgium. The tournament also served as a direct qualifier for the 2020 Tokyo olympics, with the winner qualifying.

The Netherlands won their tenth overall title after defeating Germany 2–0 in the final. Meanwhile, Spain conquered the bronze medal after a penalty-shootout win over England.

== Qualified teams ==
The following teams, shown with pre-tournament world rankings, participated in the 2019 EuroHockey Championship.

Dates	Event	Location	Quotas	Qualifier(s)
15 June 2016	Host		1	Belgium (9)
18–26 August 2017	2017 EuroHockey Championship	Amstelveen, Netherlands	5	Netherlands (1); England (4); Germany (5); Spain (7); Ireland (8)
6–12 August 2017	2017 EuroHockey Championship II	Cardiff, Wales	2	Belarus (22); Russia (23)
Total			8	

== Format ==
The eight teams were split into two groups of four teams. The top two teams advanced to the semifinals to determine the winner in a knockout system. The bottom two teams played in a new group with the teams they did not play against in the group stage. The last two teams were relegated to the EuroHockey Championship II.

== Results ==
All times are local (UTC+2).

=== Preliminary round ===
==== Pool A ====
Pos	Team	Pld	W	D	L	GF	GA	GD	Pts	Qualification
1	Spain	3	2	1	0	3	1	+2	7	Semi-finals
2	Netherlands	3	1	2	0	16	2	+14	5	Semi-finals
3	Belgium (H)	3	1	1	1	5	3	+2	4	Pool C
4	Russia	3	0	0	3	1	19	−18	0	Pool C

Source: FIH
Rules for classification: 1) points; 2) matches won; 3) goal difference; 4) goals for; 5) head-to-head result; 6) field goals for.
(H) Hosts

17 August 2019
18:00

Spain	1–0	Russia
Iglesias 58'	Report

Umpires:
Hannah Harrison (ENG)
Celine Martin-Schmets (BEL)

17 August 2019
20:30

Netherlands	1–1	Belgium
Matla 8'	Report	Struijk 45'

Umpires:
Ivona Makar (CRO)
Alison Keogh (IRL)

19 August 2019
18:00

Spain	1–1	Netherlands
B. García 6'	Report	Van Maasakker 5'

Umpires:
Michelle Meister (GER)
Hannah Harrison (ENG)

19 August 2019
20:30

Belgium	4–1	Russia
Versavel 8', 48'; Weyns 13'; Vanden Borre 14'	Report	Sadovaia 24'

Umpires:
Vilma Bagdanskiene (LTU)
Sarah Wilson (SCO)

21 August 2019
18:00

Netherlands	14–0	Russia
De Goede 1', 17'; Stam 15+'; Van Maasakker 19', 34'; Keetels 24'; Veen 37', 54'; Jonker 43', 52'; Welten 47', 49'; Van Geffen 51'; Matla 58'	Report

Umpires:
Cathy Wright (WAL)
Alison Keogh (IRL)

21 August 2019
20:30

Belgium	0–1	Spain
	Report	Petchamé 34'

Umpires:
Michelle Meister (GER)
Sarah Wilson (SCO)

==== Pool B ====
Pos	Team	Pld	W	D	L	GF	GA	GD	Pts	Qualification
1	England	3	2	1	0	7	5	+2	7	Semi-finals
2	Germany	3	1	2	0	15	2	+13	5	Semi-finals
3	Ireland	3	1	1	1	13	3	+10	4	Pool C
4	Belarus	3	0	0	3	3	28	−25	0	Pool C

Source: FIH
Rules for classification: 1) points; 2) matches won; 3) goal difference; 4) goals for; 5) head-to-head result; 6) field goals for.

18 August 2019
09:00

Germany	13–0	Belarus
Lorenz 15', 47'; Maertens 16', 26'; Grote 20', 23', 37', 42'; Pieper 40'; Micheel 43'; Oruz 44'; Schröder 46', 55'	Report

Umpires:
Ana Faias (POR)
Vilma Bagdanskiene (LTU)

18 August 2019
11:15

England	2–1	Ireland
Petty 15'; Ansley 28'	Report	Barr 43'

Umpires:
Claire Druijts (NED)
Cathy Wright (WAL)

19 August 2019
13:30

Germany	1–1	England
Gablać 45'	Report	Owsley 24'

Umpires:
Laurine Delforge (BEL)
Claire Druijts (NED)

19 August 2019
15:45

Ireland	11–0	Belarus
Upton 4', 34', 39', 57'; O'Flanagan 13', 47'; Wilson 31'; Evans 38', 42'; Barr 41'; Duke 55'	Report

Umpires:
Ivona Makar (CRO)
Celine Martin-Schmets (BEL)

21 August 2019
10:00

England	4–3	Belarus
Owsley 9'; Petter 15'; Unsworth 22'; Martin 56'	Report	Syddykava 16'; Syrayezhka 22'; Shtsin 53'

Umpires:
Claire Druijts (NED)
Ana Faias (POR)

21 August 2019
12:15

Ireland	1–1	Germany
Hawkshaw 15+'	Report	Maertens 8'

Umpires:
Laurine Delforge (BEL)
Hannah Harrison (ENG)

=== Fifth to eighth place classification ===
==== Pool C ====
The points obtained in the preliminary round against the other team were taken over.

Pos	Team	Pld	W	D	L	GF	GA	GD	Pts	Relegation
5	Ireland	3	3	0	0	16	3	+13	9	
6	Belgium	3	2	0	1	8	4	+4	6	
7	Russia	3	1	0	2	8	7	+1	3	Relegation to Championship II
8	Belarus	3	0	0	3	1	19	−18	0	Relegation to Championship II

Source: FIH
Rules for classification: 1) points; 2) matches won; 3) goal difference; 4) goals for; 5) head-to-head result; 6) field goals for.

23 August 2019
13:30

Russia	5–0	Belarus
Sadovaia 24', 28'; Koroleva 39'; Shumilina 50'; Cheplygina 52'	Report

Umpires:
Cathy Wright (WAL)
Alison Keogh (IRL)

23 August 2019
15:45

Belgium	1–2	Ireland
Ballenghien 44'	Report	Barr 11'; O'Flanagan 59'

Umpires:
Claire Druijts (NED)
Ivona Makar (CRO)

25 August 2019
09:00

Ireland	3–2	Russia
Evans 32'; Hawkshaw 50'; Mullan 58'	Report	Sadovaia 23'; Leonova 52'

Umpires:
Celine Martin-Schmets (BEL)
Ana Faias (POR)

25 August 2019
11:15

Belgium	3–1	Belarus
Vanden Borre 22'; Nelen 37'; Boon 52'	Report	Bahushevich 47'

Umpires:
Vilma Bagdanskiene (LTU)
Michelle Meister (GER)

=== First to fourth place classification ===
Semi-finals
23 August
Spain	2
Germany	3
23 August
England	0
Netherlands	8

Final
25 August
Germany	0
Netherlands	2
Third place
25 August
Spain (p.s.o.)	1 (3)
England	1 (2)

==== Semi-finals ====
23 August 2019
18:00

England	0–8	Netherlands
	Report	Leurink 12', 55'; Welten 20', 51'; Van Maasakker 28', 50'; Keetels 35'; De Waard 43'

Umpires:
Michelle Meister (GER)
Sarah Wilson (SCO)

23 August 2019
20:30

Spain	2–3	Germany
López 14'; Segú 52'	Report	Pieper 22'; Gablać 33'; Lorenz 60'

Umpires:
Hannah Harrison (ENG)
Laurine Delforge (BEL)

==== Third and fourth place ====
25 August 2019
13:30

Spain	1–1	England
Tost 36'	Report	Martin 10'
Penalties
Ycart (penalty shoot-out scored); Torres-Quevedo (penalty shoot-out missed); García Grau (penalty shoot-out scored); Pérez (penalty shoot-out scored)	3–2	(penalty shoot-out scored) Martin; (penalty shoot-out scored) Toman; (penalty shoot-out missed) Rayer; (penalty shoot-out missed) Haycroft; (penalty shoot-out missed) Webb

Umpires:
Alison Keogh (IRL)
Ivona Makar (CRO)

==== Final ====
25 August 2019
16:00

Germany	0–2	Netherlands
	Report	Jonker 12'; Welten 60'

Umpires:
Sarah Wilson (SCO)
Laurine Delforge (BEL)

== Statistics ==
=== Final standings ===
As per statistical convention in field hockey, matches decided in extra time are counted as wins and losses, while matches decided by penalty shoot-outs are counted as draws.

Pos	Team	Pld	W	D	L	GF	GA	GD	Pts	Status
1st place, gold medalist(s)	Netherlands	5	3	2	0	26	2	+24	11	Qualified for 2020 Summer Olympics
2nd place, silver medalist(s)	Germany	5	2	2	1	18	6	+12	8	
3rd place, bronze medalist(s)	Spain	5	2	2	1	6	5	+1	8	
4	England	5	2	2	1	8	14	−6	8	
5	Ireland	5	3	1	1	18	6	+12	10	
6	Belgium	5	2	1	2	9	6	+3	7	
7	Russia	5	1	0	4	8	22	−14	3	Relegated to EuroHockey Championship II
8	Belarus	5	0	0	5	4	36	−32	0	Relegated to EuroHockey Championship II

Source: FIH

=== Awards ===
The following awards were given at the conclusion of the tournament.

Player of the Tournament	Top Goalscorers	Goalkeeper of the Tournament	Young player of the Tournament
(Spain) Georgina Oliva	(Netherlands) Caia van Maasakker (Netherlands) Lidewij Welten	(Spain) María Ruiz	(Germany) Pia Maertens

=== Goalscorers ===
There were 97 goals scored in 20 matches, for an average of 4.85 goals per match.

5 goals

- (Netherlands) Caia van Maasakker
- (Netherlands) Lidewij Welten

4 goals

- (Germany) Rebecca Grote
- (Ireland) Roisin Upton
- (Russia) Bogdana Sadovaia

3 goals

- (Germany) Nike Lorenz
- (Germany) Pia Maertens
- (Ireland) Bethany Barr
- (Ireland) Nicola Evans
- (Ireland) Anna O'Flanagan
- (Netherlands) Kelly Jonker

2 goals

- (Belgium) Stephanie Vanden Borre
- (Belgium) Louise Versavel
- (England) Hannah Martin
- (England) Lily Owsley
- (Germany) Hannah Gablać
- (Germany) Cécile Pieper
- (Germany) Anne Schröder
- (Ireland) Sarah Hawkshaw
- (Netherlands) Eva de Goede
- (Netherlands) Marloes Keetels
- (Netherlands) Laurien Leurink
- (Netherlands) Frédérique Matla
- (Netherlands) Marijn Veen

1 goal

- (Belarus) Sviatlana Bahushevich
- (Belarus) Natallia Shtsin
- (Belarus) Karyna Syddykava
- (Belarus) Nastassia Syrayezhka
- (Belgium) Ambre Ballenghien
- (Belgium) Jill Boon
- (Belgium) Barbara Nelen
- (Belgium) Michelle Struijk
- (Belgium) Anne-Sophie Weyns
- (England) Giselle Ansley
- (England) Isabelle Petter
- (England) Suzy Petty
- (England) Laura Unsworth
- (Germany) Lena Micheel
- (Germany) Selin Oruz
- (Ireland) Deirdre Duke
- (Ireland) Kathryn Mullan
- (Ireland) Zoe Wilson
- (Netherlands) Margot van Geffen
- (Netherlands) Lauren Stam
- (Netherlands) Xan de Waard
- (Netherlands) Lidewij Welten
- (Russia) Iuliia Cheplygina
- (Russia) Kseniia Koroleva
- (Russia) Aleksandra Leonova
- (Russia) Kristina Shumilina
- (Spain) María López
- (Spain) Begoña García
- (Spain) Belén Iglesias
- (Spain) Carlota Petchamé
- (Spain) Marta Segú
- (Spain) María Tost

Source: FIH

== See also ==
- 2019 Men's EuroHockey Nations Championship
- 2019 Women's EuroHockey Championship II
- 2019 Women's EuroHockey Junior Championship
