= 2013–14 División de Honor de Hockey Hierba =

División de Honor 2013–14
Tournament details
- Dates: October 6 – April 27 (regular season/2nd stage); May 3/4 (final stage) –
- Teams: 12

Final positions
- Champions: R.C. Polo (12th title)
- Runner-up: Club Egara

Tournament summary
- Matches played: 99
- Goals scored: 466 (4.71 per match)
- Most goals: Roger Padrós, 16 goals

The División de Honor 2013–14 is the 51st season of the top flight of the Spanish domestic field hockey competitions since its inception in 1958. It began in autumn 2013. The defending champions are R.C. Polo, while R.C. Jolaseta and Sardinero are the teams promoted from División de Honor B.

R.C. Polo won its second title in a row (12th in total) by defeating Club Egara 1–1 (4–3 p.s.) in the Championship Final.

== Competition ==
=== Format ===
Competition format changes for 2013–14 season. The competition it divides in three stages; regular season, 2nd stage and playoffs. Regular season comprises 11 matchdays played from October to March through a one-leg format. When regular season finish, table splits into two groups of 6 teams each; in Group 1, top four teams qualify for final stage, while in the Group B, bottom three teams are relegated to División de Honor B. Points during regular season/2nd stage are awarded as follows:

- 2 points for a win
- 1 point for a draw

== Teams ==
División de Honor de Hockey Hierba 2013–14 teams
Canary Islands

Team	Stadium	Capacity	City/Area
R.C. de Polo	Camp d'hoquei Eduardo Dualde	600	Barcelona
Club de Campo	Instalaciones Club de Campo	300	Madrid
Club Egara	Pla del Bon Aire	800	Terrassa
Atlètic Terrassa	Camp d'hoquei Josep Marquès	1,000	Terrassa
Complutense	Campo Municipal de Hockey	200	S.S. de los Reyes
Junior	Instal·lacions Club Júnior	800	Sant Cugat del Vallès
Taburiente ACE G.C.	Campo de Hockey Gran Canaria	100	Las Palmas de G.C.
R.S. Tenis	Campo de Hockey La Albericia	100	Santander
Barrocás	Campo de Hockey de Mariñamansa	1,000	Ourense
Atlético San Sebastián	Campo de Hockey Bera Bera	100	San Sebastián
R.C. Jolaseta	Campo de Hockey R.C. Jolaseta	100	Getxo
Sardinero	Campo de Hockey La Albericia	100	Santander

== Standings ==
=== Regular season ===
	Team	Pld	W	D	L	PF	PA	Dif	Pts
1	R.C. Polo	11	8	3	0	58	12	46	19
2	Club Egara	11	9	1	1	39	6	33	19
3	Atlètic Terrassa	11	7	3	1	30	11	19	17
4	Club de Campo	11	8	1	2	29	20	9	17
5	Complutense	11	6	3	2	33	19	14	15
6	Junior	11	3	4	4	25	18	7	10
7	Taburiente ACE G.C.	11	3	3	5	22	29	−7	9
8	Atl. San Sebastián	11	3	2	6	19	37	−18	8
9	R.C. Jolaseta	11	2	3	6	19	23	−4	7
10	Barrocás	11	1	4	6	11	44	−33	6
11	R.S. Tenis	11	1	2	8	7	35	−28	4
12	Sardinero	11	0	1	10	10	48	−38	1

Source: Real Federación Española de Hockey

Championship group
Relegation group

=== 2nd stage ===
==== Championship group ====
In the 2nd stage, teams advance with points obtained in regular season against the same group teams.

	Team	Pld	W	D	L	PF	PA	Dif	Pts
1	R.C. Polo	10	7	3	0	32	9	23	17
2	Club Egara	10	5	2	3	16	15	1	12
3	Atlètic Terrassa	10	4	3	3	19	16	3	11
4	Complutense	10	3	4	3	23	26	−3	10
5	Club de Campo	10	2	3	5	19	28	−9	7
6	Junior	10	0	3	7	16	31	−15	3

Final stage

==== Relegation group ====
In the 2nd stage, teams advance with points obtained in regular season against the same group teams.

	Team	Pld	W	D	L	PF	PA	Dif	Pts
1	Atl. San Sebastián	10	6	4	0	29	14	15	16
2	R.C. Jolaseta	10	6	2	2	33	14	19	14
3	Taburiente ACE G.C.	10	5	3	2	22	14	8	13
4	R.S. Tenis	10	3	4	3	18	16	2	10
5	Barrocás	10	1	3	6	14	36	−22	5
6	Sardinero	10	1	0	9	14	36	−22	2

Relegation playoff
Relegated

== Final stage ==
Semifinals
1	R.C. Polo	3
4	Complutense	1
2	Club Egara	3
3	Atlètic Terrassa	2

Final
1	R.C. Polo	1 (4)
2	Club Egara	1 (3)

=== Semifinals ===
3 May
12:00 (UTC+2)

R.C. Polo	3–1	Complutense
Casanovas 1'; Padrós 16'	Report	de Frutos 56'; Lleonart 69'

Eduardo Dualde, Barcelona

3 May
14:00 (UTC+2)

Club Egara	3–2	Atlètic Terrassa
Romeu 25'; Quera 54'; Ruiz 60'	Report	Guerrero 1'; Malgosa 11'

Eduardo Dualde, Barcelona

=== Final ===
4 May
12:30 (UTC+2)

R.C. Polo	1–1	Club Egara
Lleonart 22'	Report	Romeu 25'
Penalties
Padrós (penalty shoot-out scored); Alegre (penalty shoot-out scored); Lleonart (penalty shoot-out scored); Piera (penalty shoot-out missed); Rey (penalty shoot-out scored)	4–3	(penalty shoot-out missed) Romeu; (penalty shoot-out scored) Arbós; (penalty shoot-out scored) E Tubau; (penalty shoot-out scored) Arch; (penalty shoot-out missed) Fustagueras

Eduardo Dualde, Barcelona

2013–14 División de Honor winners
(Catalonia)
R.C. de Polo
Twelfth title

== Relegation playoff ==
Team 1	Agg.	Team 2	1st leg	2nd leg
Taburiente ACE G.C. (Canary Islands)	5–4	(Community of Madrid) Pozuelo	4–4	1–0

=== 1st leg ===
1 June
11:00 (UTC+2)

Pozuelo	4–4	Taburiente ACE G.C.
M García 38'; Melatto 40' de los Mozos 49'; P García 69'	Report	Abían 2'; Wookey 10' 50'; Aoki 65'

Complejo Deportivo Somontes, Campo 2, Madrid
Umpires:
Marc Gabarro, Benjamín Díaz

=== 2nd leg ===
7 June
13:00 (UTC+1)

Taburiente ACE G.C.	1–0	Pozuelo
Santana 20'	Report

Campo de Hockey Gran Canaria, Las Palmas
Umpires:
Ignasi Petanas, Fabio Tesifón

Taburiente ACE G.C. won 5–4 on aggregate and remained in División de Honor for 2014–15 season.

== Top goalscorers ==
- Regular season/2nd stage only.

Player	Goals	Team
(Spain) Roger Padrós	16	R.C. Polo
(Spain) Diego Arana	15	R.C. Jolaseta
(Spain) Xurxo Cid	15	Barrocás
(Argentina) Maximiliano Falcioni	14	Complutense
(Spain) Xavi Lleonart	12	R.C. Polo
(Spain) Alejandro de Frutos	11	Complutense
(Spain) Don Prins	10	Atlètic Terrassa
(Spain) Marc Sallés	10	Atlètic Terrassa
(Australia) Oscar Wookey	10	Taburiente ACE G.C.
(Spain) Peio Azkoaga	9	Atlético San Sebastián

== See also ==
- División de Honor Femenina de Hockey Hierba 2013–14
