= 2012–13 División de Honor de Hockey Hierba =

División de Honor
- Season: 2012–13
- Dates: 30 September 2012 – 12 May 2013
- Champions: Real Club de Polo (12th title)
- Euro Hockey League: Real Club de Polo; Club de Campo
- Matches: 132
- Goals: 650 (4.92 per match)

The División de Honor 2012–13 is the 50th season of the top flight of the Spanish domestic field hockey competitions since its inception in 1958. It began in autumn 2012. The defending champions are Atlètic Terrassa, while Caldaria-Barrocás and Junior are the teams promoted from División de Honor B.

RC Polo became champions by defeating Club de Campo 2–1 in the final series of championship playoffs.

== Competition ==
=== Format ===
The División de Honor season it divides into regular season and championship playoff. The regular season comprises 22 matchdays played from September to April through a round-robin format, a format quite common in other sports as football. When finished the 22 matchdays, the top 4 teams qualified at standings play the championship playoffs, while the bottom two teams are relegated to División de Honor B. Points during regular season are awarded as follows:

- 2 points for a win
- 1 point for a draw

During championship playoffs, both the semi-finals and the Final are played to best of three matches.

== Teams ==
Location of teams in the 2012–13 División de Honor
Location of teams in the 2011–12 División de Honor (Canary Islands)

| Team | Location | Autonomous Community | Stadium |
|---|---|---|---|
| Atlètic Terrassa | Terrassa | Catalonia | Estadi de Hockey Josep Marquès |
| Atlètico San Sebastián | San Sebastián | Basque Country | Bidebieta |
| Caldaria-Barrocas | Ourense | Galicia | Mariñamansa |
| CD Terrassa | Matadepera | Catalonia | Les Pedritxes |
| Club de Campo | Madrid | Madrid | Club de Campo |
| Club Egara | Terrassa | Catalonia | Pla de Bon Aire |
| Complutense | Madrid | Madrid | San Sebastián de los Reyes |
| Junior | Sant Cugat del Vallès | Catalonia | Sant Cugat |
| Pozuelo | Pozuelo de Alarcón | Madrid | Valle de las Cañas |
| Real Club de Polo | Barcelona | Catalonia | Eduardo Dualde |
| Taburiente | Las Palmas | Canary Islands | Campo de Hockey Gran Canaria |
| Tenis | Santander | Cantabria | Ruth Beita |

=== Number of teams by autonomous community ===
| Autonomous Community | Number of teams | Teams |
|---|---|---|
| Catalonia | 5 | Atlètic Terrassa, CD Terrassa, Club Egara, Junior and Real Club de Polo |
| Madrid | 3 | Club de Campo, Complutense and Pozuelo |
| Galicia | 1 | Caldaria-Barrocas |
| Basque Country | 1 | Atlètico San Sebastián |
| Canary Islands | 1 | Las Palmas |
| Cantabria | 1 | Tenis |
| Total | 12 | |

== Regular season standings ==
| | Team | Pld | W | D | L | PF | PA | Dif | Pts |
|---|---|---|---|---|---|---|---|---|---|
| 1 | R.C. Polo | 22 | 19 | 2 | 1 | 119 | 16 | 103 | 40 |
| 2 | Club de Campo | 22 | 19 | 1 | 2 | 116 | 25 | 91 | 39 |
| 3 | Club Egara | 22 | 18 | 1 | 3 | 70 | 31 | 39 | 37 |
| 4 | Atlètic Terrassa | 22 | 15 | 3 | 4 | 82 | 30 | 52 | 33 |
| 5 | Complutense | 22 | 11 | 2 | 9 | 47 | 47 | 0 | 24 |
| 6 | Junior | 22 | 9 | 3 | 10 | 40 | 50 | −10 | 21 |
| 7 | Taburiente ACE G.C. | 22 | 5 | 5 | 12 | 25 | 53 | −28 | 15 |
| 8 | R.S. Tenis | 22 | 5 | 4 | 13 | 33 | 69 | −36 | 14 |
| 9 | Caldaria-Barrocás | 22 | 5 | 4 | 13 | 30 | 88 | −58 | 14 |
| 10 | Atl. San Sebastián | 22 | 4 | 5 | 34 | 74 | 38 | −40 | 13 |
| 11 | Pozuelo | 22 | 2 | 4 | 16 | 32 | 84 | −52 | 8 |
| 12 | Terrassa | 22 | 2 | 2 | 18 | 22 | 83 | −61 | 6 |

Source: Real Federación Española de Hockey

| Championship playoffs |
| Relegated |

== Play-offs ==
=== Bracket ===
Semi-finals
Real Club de Polo | 2 (3) | 3
Atlètic Terrassa | 2 (2) | 1
Club de Campo | 3 | 3 (4)
Club Egara | 0 | 3 (3)

Final
Real Club de Polo | 5 | 3 | 4
Club de Campo | 3 | 6 | 1

=== Semifinals ===
==== 1st leg ====
21 April
12:30 (UTC+2)

| Club Egara | 0–3 | Club de Campo |
|---|---|---|
| | Report | Arana 8'; Lasso 42'; Fürste 61' |

Pla del Bon Aire, Terrassa

21 April
12:30 (UTC+2)

| Atlètic Terrassa | 2–2 | R.C. Polo |
|---|---|---|
| Sallés 18'; R. Pablo 48' | Report | Casasayas 24'; Lleonart 41' |
Penalties
| S. Enrique (penalty shoot-out scored); Malgosa (penalty shoot-out scored); Pujal (penalty shoot-out missed); Sallés (penalty shoot-out missed); Freixa (penalty shoot-out missed) | 2–3 | (penalty shoot-out scored) Alegre; (penalty shoot-out scored) Padrós; (penalty shoot-out missed) Lleonart; (penalty shoot-out missed) Casasayas; (penalty shoot-out scored) Rey |

Can Salas, Terrassa

==== 2nd leg ====
27 April
12:30 (UTC+2)

| Club de Campo | 3–3 | Club Egara |
|---|---|---|
| Arana; Deecke; Pérez-Pla | Report | ?? E. Tubau |
Penalties
| | 4–3 |

Instalaciones Club de Campo, Madrid

Club de Campo won series 2–0 and advanced to Final.

27 April
12:30 (UTC+2)

| R.C. Polo | 3–1 | Atlètic Terrassa |
|---|---|---|
| Piera 10'; Padrós 16'; Terraza | Report | R. Pablo |

Eduardo Dualde, Barcelona

R.C. Polo won series 2–0 and advanced to Final.

=== Final ===
==== 1st leg ====
5 May
13:00 (UTC+2)

| Club de Campo | 3–5 | R.C. Polo |
|---|---|---|
| ?? ?? ?? | Report | ?? ?? ?? ?? ?? |

Instalaciones Club de Campo, Madrid
Umpires:
Aitor Iparraguirre, Luis Mariano Martínez

==== 2nd leg ====
11 May
13:00 (UTC+2)

| R.C. Polo | 3–6 | Club de Campo |
|---|---|---|
| Alegre 1'; Casanovas 35'; Rey 46' | Report | Fürste 15'; Deecke 17' 36'; Arana 28'; Mir 45' |

Eduardo Dualde, Barcelona

==== 3rd leg ====
12 May
12:30 (UTC+2)

| R.C. Polo | 4–1 | Club de Campo |
|---|---|---|
| Lleonart 21'; Padrós 25'; Piera 32'; Casasayas 48' | Report | Fürste |

Eduardo Dualde, Barcelona

R.C. Polo won the final series 2–1 and became champions.

== Top goalscorers ==
- Regular season only.

| Player | Goals | Team |
|---|---|---|
| (Spain) Roger Padrós | 28 | RC Polo |
| (Germany) Moritz Fürste | 23 | Club de Campo |
| (Spain) Xavi Lleonart | 17 | RC Polo |
| (Spain) Àlex Casasayas | 16 | RC Polo |
| (Spain) Eduard Arbós | 15 | Club Egara |
| (Spain) David Alegre | 15 | RC Polo |
| (Wales) Rufus McNaught-Barrington | 14 | R.S. Tenis |
| (Spain) Xurxo Cid | 13 | Caldaria-Barrocás |
| (Spain) Marc Sallés | 12 | Atlètic Terrassa |
| (Spain) Diego Arana | 12 | Club de Campo |
