= 2019–20 División de Honor de Hockey Hierba =

División de Honor
- Season: 2019–20
- Dates: 2 November 2019 – 13 March 2020
- Euro Hockey League: Atlètic Terrassa
- EHL Cup: Club de Campo
- Matches: 65
- Goals: 295 (4.54 per match)
- Top goalscorer: Marc Miralles (14 goals)
- Biggest home win: Complutense 6–1 Tenis; Club de Campo 5–0 CD Terrassa; Atlètic Terrassa 6–1 Jolaseta
- Biggest away win: Real Club de Polo 0–4 Atlètic Terrassa; Jolaseta 0–4 Club Egara; Jolaseta 0–4 Real Club de Polo
- Highest scoring: CD Terrassa 6–6 Jolaseta

The 2019–20 División de Honor de Hockey Hierba was the 54th season of the División de Honor de Hockey Hierba, the highest field hockey league in Spain. The season began on 2 November 2019 and was scheduled to conclude with the second match of the championship final on 10 May 2020 in Barcelona.

Club Egara were the defending champions, while Complutense entered as the promoted team from the 2018–19 División de Honor Masculina B.

On 13 March 2020, the league was suspended for at least two weeks due to the COVID-19 pandemic in Spain. The league was officially voided on 6 May 2020 with no relegation and no champion. Atlètic Terrassa qualified for the 2021 Euro Hockey League as the highest-ranked team and Real Club de Polo qualified as the 2020 Copa del Rey winners but they later withdrew and were replaced by Club de Campo. The next season will be played with 12 teams as the best two teams from the second division are promoted and there is no relegation.

== Teams ==
Location of teams in the 2019–20 División de Honor
Location of Province of Barcelona teams in the 2019–20 División de Honor

Team	Location	Stadium
Atlètic Terrassa	Terrassa	Estadi de Hockey Josep Marquès
Barcelona	Barcelona	Pau Negre Stadium
CD Terrassa	Matadepera	Les Pedritxes
Club de Campo	Madrid	Club de Campo
Club Egara	Terrassa	Pla de Bon Aire
Complutense	Madrid	San Sebastián de los Reyes
Jolaseta	Getxo	R.C. Jolaseta
Junior	Sant Cugat del Vallès	Sant Cugat
Real Club de Polo	Barcelona	Eduardo Dualde
Tenis	Santander	Ruth Beita

=== Number of teams by autonomous community ===
Autonomous Community	Number of teams	Teams
Catalonia	6	Atlètic Terrassa, Barcelona, CD Terrassa, Club Egara, Junior, and Real Club de Polo
Madrid	2	Club de Campo and Complutense
Basque Country	1	Jolaseta
Cantabria	1	Tenis
Total	10	

== Regular season ==
=== League table ===
Pos	Team	Pld	W	D	L	GF	GA	GD	Pts	Qualification or relegation
1	Atlètic Terrassa	13	8	4	1	40	24	+16	28	Qualification for the Euro Hockey League
2	Club Egara	13	7	5	1	34	19	+15	26	
3	Club de Campo	13	8	2	3	35	24	+11	26	Qualification for the Euro Hockey League Cup
4	Real Club de Polo	13	7	2	4	36	28	+8	23	
5	Complutense	13	5	4	4	33	27	+6	19	
6	Tenis	13	5	3	5	25	29	−4	18	
7	Junior	13	4	2	7	25	29	−4	14	
8	Barcelona	13	3	3	7	28	32	−4	12	
9	CD Terrassa	13	1	4	8	23	41	−18	7	
10	Jolaseta	13	1	3	9	16	42	−26	6	

Source: RFEH

=== Results ===
Home \ Away	ATL	BAR	CDT	CDC	EGA	COM	JOL	JNR	RCP	TEN
Atlètic Terrassa	—	3–2		3–3			6–1	3–2	6–3	2–2
Barcelona	2–3	—	2–2	3–2	2–4	1–3		4–3		4–1
CD Terrassa	2–2	2–1	—			2–4	6–6	2–3	1–3	
Club de Campo	2–1		5–0	—		1–0	3–0	2–1	2–1	3–4
Club Egara	2–2	2–2	4–1	2–3	—	3–1		3–1	2–2	
Complutense	2–3			4–4	2–2	—	3–1	1–1		6–1
Jolaseta		2–1	1–1	1–4	0–4	1–2	—		0–4	1–1
Junior	1–2	2–2	2–1		2–3		2–1	—	2–4	
Real Club de Polo	0–4	3–2	6–3		1–1	5–3			—	4–1
Tenis			2–0	4–1	0–2	2–2	5–1	1–3	1–0	—

Source: RFEH
Legend: Blue = home team win; Yellow = draw; Red = away team win.

== Top goalscorers ==
As of 8 March 2020

Rank	Player	Club	Goals
1	(Spain) Marc Miralles	CD Terrassa	14
2	(Spain) Pepe Cunill	Atlètic Terrassa	11
3	(Spain) Xavi Lleonart	Real Club de Polo	10
3	(Spain) Pau Quemada	Club Egara	10
5	(Spain) Borja Llorens	Real Club de Polo	9
6	(Spain) Alejandro Alonso	Tenis	8
6	(Spain) Ricardo Sánchez	Complutense	8
8	(Spain) José Basterra	Club de Campo	7
8	(Spain) Enrique Zorita	Club de Campo	7
10	(Spain) Gabriel Dabanch	Junior	6
