= 2019 Men's EuroHockey Championship squads =

This article lists the confirmed squads for the 2019 Men's EuroHockey Nations Championship tournament held in Antwerp, Belgium between 16 and 24 August 2019. The eight national teams were required to register a playing squad of eighteen players and two reserves.

Age, caps and club for each player are as of 16 August 2019, the first day of the tournament.

== Pool A ==
=== Belgium ===
The squad was announced on 7 August 2019.

Head coach: (New Zealand) Shane McLeod

No.	Pos.	Player	Date of birth (age)	Caps	Club
2	GK	Loic Van Doren	14 September 1996 (aged 22)	18	(Netherlands) Den Bosch
4	DF	Arthur Van Doren	1 October 1994 (aged 24)	169	(Netherlands) Bloemendaal
7	MF	John-John Dohmen	24 January 1988 (aged 31)	381	(Belgium) Waterloo Ducks
8	FW	Florent Van Aubel	25 September 1991 (aged 27)	219	(Belgium) Dragons
10	FW	Cédric Charlier	27 November 1987 (aged 31)	307	(Belgium) Racing Bruxelles
12	DF	Gauthier Boccard	26 August 1991 (aged 27)	208	(Belgium) Waterloo Ducks
13	FW	Nicolas De Kerpel	23 April 1993 (aged 26)	55	(Belgium) Herakles
15	DF	Emmanuel Stockbroekx	23 December 1993 (aged 25)	144	(Netherlands) Bloemendaal
16	DF	Alexander Hendrickx	6 August 1993 (aged 26)	110	(Netherlands) Pinoké
17	FW	Thomas Briels (C)	23 August 1987 (aged 31)	331	(Netherlands) Oranje-Rood
19	MF	Félix Denayer	31 January 1990 (aged 29)	307	(Belgium) Dragons
21	GK	Vincent Vanasch	21 December 1987 (aged 31)	225	(Belgium) Waterloo Ducks
22	MF	Simon Gougnard	17 January 1991 (aged 28)	264	(Belgium) Waterloo Ducks
23	DF	Arthur De Sloover	3 May 1997 (aged 22)	72	(Belgium) Beerschot
24	FW	Antoine Kina	13 February 1996 (aged 23)	54	(Belgium) Gantoise
25	DF	Loïck Luypaert	19 August 1991 (aged 27)	230	(Belgium) Braxgata
26	MF	Victor Wegnez	25 December 1995 (aged 23)	77	(Belgium) Racing Bruxelles
27	FW	Tom Boon	25 January 1990 (aged 29)	284	(Belgium) Racing Bruxelles

=== England ===
The squad was announced on 7 August 2019.

Head coach: Danny Kerry

No.	Pos.	Player	Date of birth (age)	Caps	Club
1	GK	George Pinner	18 January 1987 (aged 32)	185	(England) Holcombe
2	GK	Harry Gibson	25 March 1993 (aged 26)	69	(England) Surbiton
4	DF	Ollie Willars	25 June 1990 (aged 29)	126	(England) Beeston
5	DF	David Ames	25 June 1989 (aged 30)	79	(England) Holcombe
6	DF	Henry Weir	13 February 1990 (aged 29)	173	(England) Wimbledon
7	MF	Ashley Jackson	27 August 1987 (aged 31)	239	(Netherlands) HGC
9	MF	Harry Martin	23 October 1992 (aged 26)	214	(England) Hampstead & Westminster
10	FW	Chris Griffiths	3 September 1990 (aged 28)	91	(England) East Grinstead
11	MF	Ian Sloan	19 November 1993 (aged 25)	92	(England) Wimbledon
13	FW	Sam Ward	24 December 1990 (aged 28)	115	(England) Old Georgians
15	MF	Phil Roper	24 January 1992 (aged 27)	129	(England) Wimbledon
16	DF	Adam Dixon (C)	11 September 1986 (aged 32)	256	(England) Beeston
18	DF	Brendan Creed	3 January 1993 (aged 26)	67	(England) Surbiton
25	DF	Jack Waller	28 January 1997 (aged 22)	29	(England) Wimbledon
26	MF	James Gall	20 May 1995 (aged 24)	63	(England) Surbiton
29	MF	Tom Sorsby	28 October 1996 (aged 22)	11	(England) Surbiton
31	FW	Will Calnan	17 April 1996 (aged 23)	22	(England) Hampstead & Westminster
32	FW	Zachary Wallace	29 September 1999 (aged 19)	30	(England) Surbiton

=== Spain ===
The squad was announced on 7 August 2019.

Head coach: (France) Frederic Soyez

No.	Pos.	Player	Date of birth (age)	Caps	Club
1	GK	Francisco Cortés Juncosa	29 March 1983 (aged 36)	285	(Spain) Club Egara
3	DF	Sergi Enrique	22 September 1987 (aged 31)	301	(Spain) Junior
4	DF	Ricardo Sánchez	4 December 1992 (aged 26)	64	(Belgium) Gantoise
6	DF	Ignacio Rodríguez	12 June 1996 (aged 23)	43	(Spain) Club de Campo
7	MF	Miquel Delas (C)	13 April 1984 (aged 35)	234	(Spain) Barcelona
8	FW	Enrique González	29 April 1996 (aged 23)	98	(Spain) Club de Campo
9	MF	Álvaro Iglesias	1 March 1993 (aged 26)	119	(Spain) Club de Campo
10	MF	Marc Sallés	6 May 1987 (aged 32)	223	(Spain) Club de Campo
12	MF	Joan Tarrés	8 May 1996 (aged 23)	32	(Spain) Atlètic Terrassa
15	FW	Diego Arana	12 September 1988 (aged 30)	50	(Spain) Jolaseta
16	DF	Llorenç Piera Grau	4 November 1996 (aged 22)	18	(Spain) Real Club de Polo
17	FW	Xavi Lleonart	22 June 1990 (aged 29)	191	(Spain) Real Club de Polo
18	MF	Alejandro de Frutos	29 September 1992 (aged 26)	100	(Spain) Club de Campo
21	MF	Viçens Ruiz	30 October 1991 (aged 27)	143	(Spain) Club Egara
23	DF	Josep Romeu	22 May 1990 (aged 29)	114	(Spain) Club Egara
24	GK	Mario Garín	26 April 1992 (aged 27)	51	(Spain) Real Club de Polo
25	FW	Pau Quemada	4 September 1983 (aged 35)	256	(Spain) Club Egara
27	FW	Marc Boltó	21 November 1995 (aged 23)	50	(Spain) Atlètic Terrassa

=== Wales ===
The squad was announced on 1 August 2019.

Head coach: Zak Jones

No.	Pos.	Player	Date of birth (age)	Caps	Club
1	GK	James Fortnam	18 May 1990 (aged 29)	34	(Wales) Cardiff & Met
3	MF	Daniel Kyriakides	21 March 1995 (aged 24)	76	(Germany) Crefelder HTC
6	DF	Jacob Draper	24 July 1998 (aged 21)	40	(England) Hampstead & Westminster
7		Joe Naughalty	13 April 1987 (aged 32)	89	(England) East Grinstead
8		Lewis Prosser (C)	13 June 1989 (aged 30)	144	(England) East Grinstead
9	MF	Rupert Shipperley (C)	21 November 1992 (aged 26)	65	(England) Hampstead & Westminster
10		Rhodri Furlong	18 October 1995 (aged 23)	48	(England) Hampstead & Westminster
11		James Carson	29 April 1994 (aged 25)	64	(England) Exeter
12		Steve Kelly	12 May 1992 (aged 27)	51	(England) Hampstead & Westminster
13		Dale Hutchinson	23 October 1993 (aged 25)	73	(Netherlands) Tilburg
15		Rhys Bradshaw	19 September 2000 (aged 18)	12	(Wales) Cardiff & Met
18		Gareth Furlong	10 May 1992 (aged 27)	107	(Netherlands) Tilburg
19		Owain Dolan-Gray	17 December 1990 (aged 28)	109	(Germany) Harvestehuder THC
21		Jonny Gooch	3 January 1994 (aged 25)	49	(England) Hampstead & Westminster
24		Hywel Jones	9 July 1997 (aged 22)	27	(England) Hampstead & Westminster
25		Ben Francis	20 March 1996 (aged 23)	68	(England) Wimbledon
26		Luke Hawker (C)	29 December 1989 (aged 29)	86	(Wales) Cardiff & Met
32	GK	Leuan Tranter	7 November 1994 (aged 24)	15	(England) Surbiton

== Pool B ==
=== Germany ===
The squad was announced on 27 July 2019. Malte Hellwig replaced Marco Miltkau due to an injury.

Head coach: Stefan Kermas

No.	Pos.	Player	Date of birth (age)	Caps	Club
2	DF	Mathias Müller	3 April 1992 (aged 27)	105	(Germany) Hamburger Polo Club
3	FW	Mats Grambusch (C)	4 November 1992 (aged 26)	136	(Germany) Rot-Weiss Köln
4	DF	Lukas Windfeder	11 May 1995 (aged 24)	102	(Germany) Uhlenhorst Mülheim
6	DF	Martin Häner	27 August 1988 (aged 30)	238	(Germany) Berliner HC
9	FW	Niklas Wellen	14 December 1994 (aged 24)	125	(Germany) Crefelder HTC
10	MF	Dan Nguyen	8 December 1991 (aged 27)	62	(Germany) Mannheimer HC
12	MF	Timm Herzbruch	7 June 1997 (aged 22)	73	(Germany) Uhlenhorst Mülheim
15	DF	Tom Grambusch	4 August 1995 (aged 24)	64	(Germany) Rot-Weiss Köln
16	MF	Dieter Linnekogel	15 July 1992 (aged 27)	67	(Germany) Club an der Alster
17	FW	Christopher Rühr	19 December 1993 (aged 25)	128	(Germany) Rot-Weiss Köln
18	DF	Ferdinand Weinke	26 January 1995 (aged 24)	50	(Germany) Uhlenhorst Mülheim
20	MF	Martin Zwicker	27 February 1987 (aged 32)	221	(Germany) Berliner HC
21	GK	Tobias Walter	16 February 1990 (aged 29)	53	(Belgium) Dragons
23	FW	Florian Fuchs	10 November 1991 (aged 27)	205	(Netherlands) Bloemendaal
27	MF	Timur Oruz	27 October 1994 (aged 24)	66	(Germany) Rot-Weiss Köln
29	DF	Johannes Große	7 January 1997 (aged 22)	42	(Germany) Rot-Weiss Köln
30	GK	Victor Aly	2 June 1994 (aged 25)	14	(Germany) Rot-Weiss Köln
31	FW	Malte Hellwig	23 October 1997 (aged 21)	11	(Germany) Uhlenhorst Mülheim

=== Ireland ===
The squad was announced on 30 July 2019.

Head coach: (Netherlands) Alexander Cox

No.	Pos.	Player	Date of birth (age)	Caps	Club
2	GK	Jamie Carr	13 June 1996 (aged 23)	32	(Ireland) Three Rock Rovers
3	DF	John Jackson	21 February 1986 (aged 33)	254	(England) Bath Buccaneers
4	DF	Jonathan Bell (C)	19 June 1987 (aged 32)	171	(Ireland) Lisnagarvey
7	MF	Tim Cross	26 January 1991 (aged 28)	6	(Netherlands) Tilburg
12	FW	Eugene Magee	1 April 1986 (aged 33)	288	(Ireland) Banbridge
15	MF	Kirk Shimmins	1 June 1994 (aged 25)	112	(Belgium) Dragons
16	MF	Shane O'Donoghue	24 November 1992 (aged 26)	180	(Belgium) Dragons
17	MF	Sean Murray	5 April 1997 (aged 22)	68	(Netherlands) Rotterdam
22	FW	Michael Robson	18 April 1995 (aged 24)	104	(Germany) Crefelder HTC
24	FW	Ben Walker	13 July 1999 (aged 20)	27	(Ireland) Three Rock Rovers
25	MF	Daragh Walsh	27 August 1997 (aged 21)	41	(Ireland) Three Rock Rovers
26	DF	Paul Gleghorne	11 April 1987 (aged 32)	233	(Germany) Crefelder HTC
27	DF	Conor Harte	3 April 1988 (aged 31)	242	(Belgium) Racing Bruxelles
28	MF	Jeremy Duncan	2 August 1994 (aged 25)	46	(Belgium) Herakles
29	DF	Lee Cole	21 February 1995 (aged 24)	79	(Belgium) Orée
30	DF	Stuart Loughrey	20 February 1991 (aged 28)	124	(England) Reading
31	GK	Mark Ingram	3 November 1993 (aged 25)	21	(Netherlands) Rotterdam
32	MF	Stephen Cole	28 August 1991 (aged 27)	73	(Ireland) Monkstown

=== Netherlands ===
The squad was announced on 29 July 2019.

Head coach: (Argentina) Maximiliano Caldas

No.	Pos.	Player	Date of birth (age)	Caps	Club
2	FW	Jeroen Hertzberger	24 February 1986 (aged 33)	237	(Netherlands) Rotterdam
4	DF	Lars Balk	26 February 1996 (aged 23)	49	(Netherlands) Kampong
6	MF	Jonas de Geus	29 April 1998 (aged 21)	66	(Netherlands) Almere
8	MF	Billy Bakker	23 November 1988 (aged 30)	204	(Netherlands) Amsterdam
9	MF	Seve van Ass (C)	10 April 1992 (aged 27)	162	(Netherlands) HGC
11	MF	Glenn Schuurman	16 April 1991 (aged 28)	129	(Netherlands) Bloemendaal
12	DF	Sander de Wijn	2 May 1990 (aged 29)	136	(Netherlands) Kampong
13	DF	Sander Baart	30 April 1988 (aged 31)	184	(Belgium) Braxgata
15	MF	Diede van Puffelen	20 February 1992 (aged 27)	24	(Netherlands) Rotterdam
16	FW	Mirco Pruyser	11 August 1989 (aged 30)	111	(Netherlands) Amsterdam
18	FW	Bjorn Kellerman	25 May 1990 (aged 29)	53	(Netherlands) Kampong
22	GK	Sam van der Ven	5 September 1989 (aged 29)	49	(Netherlands) HGC
23	DF	Joep de Mol	10 December 1995 (aged 23)	65	(Netherlands) Oranje-Rood
25	FW	Thierry Brinkman	19 March 1995 (aged 24)	87	(Netherlands) Bloemendaal
26	GK	Pirmin Blaak	8 March 1988 (aged 31)	87	(Netherlands) Oranje-Rood
27	DF	Jip Janssen	14 October 1997 (aged 21)	21	(Netherlands) Kampong
30	DF	Mink van der Weerden	19 December 1988 (aged 30)	156	(Netherlands) Oranje-Rood
34	FW	Jelle Galema	16 November 1992 (aged 26)	64	(Netherlands) Den Bosch

=== Scotland ===
The squad was announced on 12 August 2019.

Head coach: Derek Forsyth

No.	Pos.	Player	Date of birth (age)	Caps	Club
1	GK	Thomas Alexander	11 September 1989 (aged 29)	40	(Germany) UHC Hamburg
2	DF	Tim Atkins	24 March 1990 (aged 29)	28	(England) Surbiton
3	DF	Callum Duke	5 July 1990 (aged 29)	63	(Scotland) Hillhead
5	MF	Michael Bremner	22 March 1992 (aged 27)	109	(Germany) UHC Hamburg
6		Andy Bull	3 February 1992 (aged 27)	14	(Belgium) Beerschot
7	FW	Alan Forsyth (C)	5 April 1992 (aged 27)	133	(England) Surbiton
11	FW	Lee Morton	23 May 1995 (aged 24)	51	(England) Reading
12		Craig Falconer	6 September 1993 (aged 25)	10	(England) Reading
13	FW	Kenny Bain	16 March 1990 (aged 29)	179	(Netherlands) Hurley
14		Cammy Golden	2 June 1999 (aged 20)	18	(Scotland) Grove Menzieshill
18		Aidan McQuade	18 November 1998 (aged 20)	25	(Scotland) Grove Menzieshill
19	DF	Murray Collins	25 July 1996 (aged 23)	36	(England) Loughborough Students
22	MF	Nicky Parkes	11 February 1990 (aged 29)	95	(England) Surbiton
23	MF	Gavin Byers	23 December 1988 (aged 30)	148	(Germany) UHC Hamburg
26	MF	Duncan Riddell	26 September 1993 (aged 25)	47	(Scotland) Grange
28	FW	Ed Greaves	15 April 1995 (aged 24)	36	(England) Loughborough Students
29	GK	David Forrester	14 December 1989 (aged 29)	42	(France) Montrouge
32		Callum MacKenzie	31 December 1998 (aged 20)	14	(Wales) Cardiff & Met
