= 2014–15 División de Honor de Hockey Hierba =

División de Honor 2014–15
Tournament details
- Dates: September 28, 2014 – April 26, 2015 (regular season); May 2/3, 2015 (final4) –
- Teams: 10

Final positions
- Champions: R.C. de Polo (13th title)
- Runner-up: Club Egara

Tournament summary
- Matches played: 90
- Goals scored: 368 (4.09 per match)
- Most goals: Leandro Tolini, 20 goals

The División de Honor 2014–15 was the 52nd season of the top flight of the Spanish domestic field hockey competitions since its inception in 1958. It began in autumn 2014. First regular season matchday was played on 28 September and the last on 26 April.

Final Four was played in Terrassa on 2–3 May.

R.C. Polo was defending champions while R.C. Jolaseta and CD Terrassa were the teams relegated to División de Honor B.

R.C. Polo won its 13th title by defeating Club Egara in the Championship Final 1–1^{(4–3)} in the shoot-outs, equalizing Club Egara's titles.

== Competition ==
=== Format ===
The División de Honor regular season takes place between September and April through 18 matchdays in a round-robin format. Upon completion of regular season, the top four teams are qualified to play the Final Four, while bottom two teams are relegated to División de Honor B. Points are awarded according to the following:

- 2 points for a win
- 1 points for a draw

== Teams ==
División de Honor de Hockey Hierba 2014–15 teams
Canary Islands

Team	Stadium	Capacity	City/Area
R.C. de Polo	Eduardo Dualde	600	Barcelona
Club Egara	Pla del Bon Aire	800	Terrassa
Atlètic Terrassa	Josep Marquès	1,000	Terrassa
SPV Complutense	Campo Municipal de Hockey	200	S.S. de los Reyes
Club de Campo	Instalaciones Club de Campo	300	Madrid
Junior	Instal·lacions Club Júnior	800	Sant Cugat del Vallès
Atlético San Sebastián	Campo de Hockey Bera Bera	100	San Sebastián
R.C. Jolaseta	Campo de Hockey R.C. Jolaseta	100	Getxo
Taburiente ACE G.C.	Campo de Hockey Gran Canaria	100	Las Palmas de G.C.
CD Terrassa	Les Pedritxes	300	Terrassa

== Regular season standings ==
Pos	Team	Pld	W	D	L	GF	GA	GD	Pts	Qualification or relegation
1	R.C. de Polo	18	16	1	1	52	13	+39	33	Qualification to Final Four
2	Club Egara	18	14	1	3	47	19	+28	29	Qualification to Final Four
3	Club de Campo	18	13	1	4	58	29	+29	27	Qualification to Final Four
4	Atlètic Terrassa	18	10	6	2	48	22	+26	26	Qualification to Final Four
5	Junior	18	7	3	8	39	36	+3	17	
6	SPV Complutense	18	5	4	9	38	45	−7	14	
7	Atlético San Sebastián	18	3	5	10	23	41	−18	11	
8	Taburiente ACE G.C.	18	3	5	10	21	42	−21	11	
9	R.C. Jolaseta	18	3	1	14	25	66	−41	7	Relegation to División de Honor B
10	CD Terrassa	18	1	3	14	17	55	−38	5	Relegation to División de Honor B

Updated to match(es) played on 1 May 2015. Source: División de Honor table and rfeh.es
Rules for classification: 1) points; 2) head-to-head points; 3) head-to-head goal difference; 4) goal difference; 5) number of goals scored

== Final four ==
Final Four was played in Terrassa on 2–3 May at Pla del Bonaire.

Semifinals
1	R.C. Polo	3
4	Atlètic Terrassa	2
2	Club Egara	7
3	Club de Campo	3

Final
1	R.C. Polo	1^{(4)}
2	Club Egara	1^{(3)}

=== Semifinals ===
2 May
15:00 (UTC+2)

R.C. Polo	3–2	Atlètic Terrassa
Terraza 18'; Piera 51'; Rey 55'	Report	I Freixa 41'; Torras 66'

Pla del Bonaire, Terrassa

2 May
17:00 (UTC+2)

Club Egara	7–3	Club de Campo
Arbós 2' 51'; V Ruiz 5'; P Romeu 21' 33' 57'; Clapés 58'	Report	A Taracena 29'; Tolini 44'; L Vila 56'

Pla del Bonaire, Terrassa

=== Final ===
3 May
13:30 (UTC+2)

R.C. Polo	1–1	Club Egara
Lleonart 18'	Report	Gui Fustagueras 19'
Penalties
Terraza (penalty shoot-out scored); Alegre (penalty shoot-out scored); Lleonart (penalty shoot-out scored); Piera (penalty shoot-out scored); Rey (penalty shoot-out missed)	4–3	(penalty shoot-out scored) Ger Fustagueras; (penalty shoot-out missed) Edi Tubau; (penalty shoot-out scored) Romeu; (penalty shoot-out scored) Arbós; (penalty shoot-out missed) de Paeuw

Pla del Bonaire, Terrassa

2014–15 División de Honor winners
(Catalonia)
R.C. de Polo
Thirteenth title

== Top goalscorers ==
- Regular season only.

#	Player	Goals	Team
1	(Argentina) Leandro Tolini	20	Club de Campo
2	(Spain) José Basterra	15	R.C. Jolaseta
3	(Spain) Pep Romeu	14	Club Egara
4	(Spain) Xavi Lleonart	13	R.C. Polo
5	(Spain) Peio Azkoaga	12	Atlético San Sebastián
5	(Spain) Marc Sallés	12	Atlètic Terrassa
7	(Argentina) Joaquín Menini	11	Club de Campo
8	(Spain) Inyaki Freixa	9	Atlètic Terrassa
8	(Spain) Gerard García	9	Junior
10	(Spain) Alejandro de Frutos	8	SPV Complutense

== See also ==
- División de Honor Femenina de Hockey Hierba 2014–15
