= 2018–19 División de Honor de Hockey Hierba =

División de Honor
- Season: 2018–19
- Dates: 9 September 2018 – 19 May 2019
- Champions: Club Egara (15th title)
- Premiers: Real Club de Polo
- Relegated: Linia 22
- Euro Hockey League: Club Egara; Real Club de Polo
- Matches played: 90
- Goals scored: 419 (4.66 per match)
- Top goalscorer: 7 players (11 goals)
- Biggest home win: Club de Campo 10–0 Linia 22
- Biggest away win: Linia 22 0–7 Atlètic Terrassa
- Highest scoring: Club de Campo 10–0 Linia 22

The 2018–19 División de Honor de Hockey Hierba was the 53rd season of the División de Honor de Hockey Hierba, the highest field hockey league in Spain. The season began on 9 September 2018 and it concluded with the championship final on 19 May 2019 in Terrassa.

Real Club de Polo were the defending champions, while Linia 22 and Jolaseta entered as the promoted teams from the 2017–18 División de Honor Masculina B. Club Egara won their 15th title by defeating Real Club de Polo 2–1 in the final.

== Teams ==
Location of teams in the 2018–19 División de Honor
Location of Province of Barcelona teams in the 2018–19 División de Honor

Team	Location	Stadium
Atlètic Terrassa	Terrassa	Estadi de Hockey Josep Marquès
Barcelona	Barcelona	Pau Negre Stadium
CD Terrassa	Matadepera	Les Pedritxes
Club de Campo	Madrid	Club de Campo
Club Egara	Terrassa	Pla de Bon Aire
Jolaseta	Getxo	R.C. Jolaseta
Junior	Sant Cugat del Vallès	Sant Cugat
Linia 22	Terrassa	Martin Colomer
Real Club de Polo	Barcelona	Eduardo Dualde
Tenis	Santander	Ruth Beita

=== Number of teams by autonomous community ===
Autonomous Community	Number of teams	Teams
Catalonia	7	Atlètic Terrassa, Barcelona, CD Terrassa, Club Egara, Junior, Linia 22 and Real Club de Polo
Madrid	1	Club de Campo
Basque Country	1	Jolaseta
Cantabria	1	Tenis
Total	10	

== Regular season ==
=== League table ===
Pos	Team	Pld	W	D	L	GF	GA	GD	Pts	Qualification or relegation
1	Real Club de Polo	18	13	3	2	43	24	+19	42	Qualification for the Euro Hockey League and play-offs
2	Atlètic Terrassa	18	13	2	3	62	31	+31	41	Qualification for the play-offs
3	Club Egara (C)	18	12	2	4	56	32	+24	38	Qualification for the Euro Hockey League and play-offs
4	Junior	18	11	4	3	51	30	+21	37	Qualification for the play-offs
5	Club de Campo	18	8	5	5	53	34	+19	29	Qualification for the play-offs
6	CD Terrassa	18	6	3	9	32	40	−8	21	Qualification for the play-offs
7	Barcelona	18	6	1	11	40	51	−11	19	Qualification for the play-offs
8	Tenis	18	5	3	10	38	47	−9	18	Qualification for the play-offs
9	Jolaseta (O)	18	3	3	12	25	54	−29	12	Qualification for the relegation play-off
10	Linia 22 (R)	18	0	0	18	19	76	−57	0	Relegation to the División de Honor Masculina B

Source: RFEH
(C) Champions; (O) Play-off winners; (R) Relegated

=== Results ===
Home \ Away	ATL	BAR	CDT	CDC	EGA	JOL	JNR	LIN	RCP	TEN
Atlètic Terrassa	—	6–2	5–2	3–1	4–3	4–4	2–2	5–1	2–3	5–0
Barcelona	1–2	—	3–4	3–2	2–3	2–1	2–2	3–1	1–3	3–1
CD Terrassa	0–1	5–1	—	0–3	1–3	2–2	1–2	4–3	1–2	1–2
Club de Campo	4–3	4–1	1–1	—	2–2	6–2	1–2	10–0	1–1	3–3
Club Egara	1–2	5–1	4–0	4–3	—	3–1	1–2	4–1	2–1	5–2
Jolaseta	1–4	1–5	1–1	0–4	0–5	—	1–2	3–2	0–2	2–1
Junior	1–2	5–4	1–2	5–2	4–2	5–0	—	6–2	2–3	4–2
Linia 22	0–7	0–4	0–1	1–2	2–4	0–2	1–4	—	1–2	1–5
Real Club de Polo	3–2	2–0	4–3	1–2	2–2	3–2	0–0	6–2	—	2–1
Tenis	2–3	4–2	2–3	2–2	2–3	3–2	2–2	4–1	0–3	—

Source: RFEH
Legend: Blue = home team win; Yellow = draw; Red = away team win.

== Play-offs ==
The semi-finals and final were played on 18 and 19 May 2019 and hosted by Club Egara in Terrassa.

=== Bracket ===
Quarter-finals
Real Club de Polo	2	4	6
Tenis	0	2	2
Junior	4	2	6
Club de Campo	3	4	7
Club Egara	2	1	3
CD Terrassa	1	0	1
Atlètic Terrassa	7	4	11
Barcelona	3	1	4

Semi-finals
18 May – Terrassa
Real Club de Polo (s.o.)	2 (4)
Club de Campo	2 (2)
18 May – Terrassa
Club Egara	2
Atlètic Terrassa	1

Final
19 May – Terrassa
Real Club de Polo	1
Club Egara	2

=== Quarter-finals ===
The quarter-finals were played over two legs, both games being played at the best-placed team's pitch.

Team 1	Agg.	Team 2	1st leg	2nd leg
Real Club de Polo	6–2	Tenis	2–0	4–2
Atlètic Terrassa	11–4	Barcelona	7–3	4–1
Club Egara	3–1	CD Terrassa	2–1	1–0
Junior	6–7	Club de Campo	4–3	2–4

11 May 2019
15:00

Real Club de Polo	2–0	Tenis
M. Reyne 15'; Oliva 67'	Report

Eduardo Dualde, Barcelona
Umpires:
Jordi Puig
Jose Saez

12 May 2019
13:30

Real Club de Polo	4–2	Tenis
M. Reyne 29'; A. Reyne 35'; Oliva 38'; Casasayas 45'	Report	Salas 6'; Alonso 53'

Eduardo Dualde, Barcelona
Umpires:
Carlos Garcia
Luis Martinez

Real Club de Polo won 6–2 on aggregate.

11 May 2019
13:00

Atlètic Terrassa	7–3	Barcelona
Q. Malgosa 3', 31', 34'; Parilla 49', 61'; Tarres 53', 70'	Report	Terraza 32'; De Bruijn 39'; Rafi 40'

Estadi de Hockey Josep Marquès, Terrassa
Umpires:
Benjamin Diaz
Eduardo Garcia

12 May 2019
13:00

Atlètic Terrassa	4–1	Barcelona
D. Malgosa 56'; Mele 60', 61'; Morera 67'	Report	Boschman 68'

Estadi de Hockey Josep Marquès, Terrassa
Umpires:
Jordi Puig
Guillen Ramal

Atlètic Terrassa won 11–4 on aggregate.

11 May 2019
12:30

Club Egara	2–1	CD Terrassa
Duran 21'; Divorra 26'	Report	Bach 34'

Pla del Bon Aire, Terrassa
Umpires:
Diego Estebanez
Carlos Garcia

12 May 2019
13:00

Club Egara	1–0	CD Terrassa
Quemada 70'	Report

Pla del Bon Aire, Terrassa
Umpires:
Daniel Rodriguez
Francisco Vazquez

Club Egara won 4–1 on aggregate.

11 May 2019
15:00

Junior	4–3	Club de Campo
Gil 23'; Dabanch 31'; Enrique 58'; Garcia 65'	Report	Tello 7'; Salles 37', 70'

Sant Cugat, Sant Cugat del Vallès
Umpires:
Luis Martinez
Daniel Rodriguez

12 May 2019
13:00

Junior	2–4	Club de Campo
Garcia 6'; Dabanch 28'	Report	Kinder 4'; Abajo 50'; Lasso 60'; Iglesias 64'

Sant Cugat, Sant Cugat del Vallès
Umpires:
Benjamin Diaz
Eduardo Garcia

Club de Campo won 7–6 on aggregate.

=== Semi-finals ===
18 May 2019
15:15

Real Club de Polo	2–2	Club de Campo
Casasayas 21'; Lleonart 38'	Report	Basterra 28'; Lasso 31'
Penalties
	4–2

Pla del Bon Aire, Terrassa
Umpires:
Andres Ortiz
Benjamin Diaz

18 May 2019
17:15

Club Egara	2–1	Atlètic Terrassa
Romeu 15'; Mercade 68'	Report	Parilla 45'

Pla del Bon Aire, Terrassa
Umpires:
Eduardo Garcia
Daniel Rodriguez

=== Final ===
19 May 2019
15:30

Real Club de Polo	1–2	Club Egara
Alegre 61'	Report	Quemada 37'; Romeu 45'

Pla del Bon Aire, Terrassa
Umpires:
Benjamin Diaz
Eduardo Garcia

=== Relegation play-off ===
26 May 2019
13:00

Jolaseta	1–1	Taburiente
	Report
Penalties
	4–3

R.C. Jolaseta, Getxo

1 June 2019
12:30

Taburiente	2–3	Jolaseta
	Report

Gran Canaria, Las Palmas

Jolaseta won series 2–0 and therefore both clubs remain in their respective leagues.

== See also ==
- 2018–19 Copa del Rey de Hockey Hierba
