= 2015–16 División de Honor de Hockey Hierba =

División de Honor 2015–16
Tournament details
- Dates: 26/27 Sep, 2015 – 1 May 2016 (regular season); 7/8 May 2016 (championship quarter-finals) – 27–29 May 2016 (final4)
- Host(s): Club de Campo
- Venue(s): Instalaciones Club de Campo
- Teams: 10

Final positions
- Champions: Club Egara (14th title)
- Runner-up: R.C. Polo

Tournament summary
- Matches played: 90
- Goals scored: 399 (4.43 per match)
- Most goals: (Argentina) Leandro Tolini, 25 goals

The División de Honor 2015–16 was the 53rd season of the top flight of the Spanish domestic field hockey competitions since its inception in 1958. It began in autumn 2015. Regular season first matchday was played on 26/27 September finishing on 1 May 2016.

Final Four was played in Madrid on 27–29 May. Club Egara won the championship fifteen years after when defeating R.C. Polo 2–2 (^{5–4 p.s.o.}).

== Competition ==
=== Format ===
The División de Honor regular season takes place between September and April through 18 matchdays in a round-robin format. Upon completion of regular season, top eight teams qualified for championship playoff, while bottom two teams are relegated to División de Honor B.

In the championship playoff, quarter-finals pairings are based as follows:

| Round | Pairing |
|---|---|
Quarter-final
| Quarter-final | A) 1st vs. 8th |
| Quarter-final | B) 2nd vs. 7th |
| Quarter-final | C) 3rd vs. 6th |
| Quarter-final | D) 4th vs. 5th |

Points during regular season are awarded according to the following:

- 2 points for a win
- 1 points for a draw

== Teams ==
División de Honor de Hockey Hierba 2015–16 teams
Canary Islands

| Team | Stadium | Capacity | City/Area |
|---|---|---|---|
| R.C. de Polo | Eduardo Dualde | 600 | Barcelona |
| Club Egara | Pla del Bon Aire | 800 | Terrassa |
| Club de Campo | Instalaciones Club de Campo | 300 | Madrid |
| Atlètic Terrassa | Josep Marquès | 1,000 | Terrassa |
| Junior | Instal·lacions Club Júnior | 800 | Sant Cugat del Vallès |
| SPV Complutense | Campo Municipal de Hockey | 200 | S.S. de los Reyes |
| Atlético San Sebastián | Campo de Hockey Bera Bera | 100 | San Sebastián |
| Taburiente | Campo de Hockey Gran Canaria | 100 | Las Palmas de G.C. |
| R.S. Tenis | La Albericia | 102 | Santander |
| Pozuelo | Valle de las Cañas | 300 | Pozuelo de Alarcón |

== Regular season standings ==
| Pos | Team | Pld | W | D | L | GF | GA | GD | Pts | Qualification or relegation |
|---|---|---|---|---|---|---|---|---|---|---|
| 1 | Club Egara | 18 | 16 | 1 | 1 | 58 | 22 | +36 | 49 | Qualification to Championship playoff |
| 2 | R.C. de Polo | 18 | 16 | 0 | 2 | 66 | 20 | +46 | 48 | Qualification to Championship playoff |
| 3 | Atlètic Terrassa | 18 | 11 | 1 | 6 | 44 | 31 | +13 | 34 | Qualification to Championship playoff |
| 4 | Club de Campo | 18 | 10 | 2 | 6 | 61 | 39 | +22 | 32 | Qualification to Championship playoff |
| 5 | Junior | 18 | 10 | 1 | 7 | 33 | 29 | +4 | 31 | Qualification to Championship playoff |
| 6 | SPV Complutense | 18 | 5 | 4 | 9 | 38 | 50 | −12 | 19 | Qualification to Championship playoff |
| 7 | R.S. Tenis | 18 | 5 | 4 | 9 | 28 | 46 | −18 | 19 | Qualification to Championship playoff |
| 8 | Taburiente ACE G.C. | 18 | 3 | 3 | 12 | 26 | 54 | −28 | 12 | Qualification to Championship playoff |
| 9 | Atlético San Sebastián | 18 | 4 | 0 | 14 | 29 | 58 | −29 | 12 | Relegated to División de Honor B |
| 10 | Pozuelo | 18 | 1 | 2 | 15 | 16 | 50 | −34 | 5 | Relegated to División de Honor B |

Updated to match(es) played on 7 May 2016. Source: División de Honor table and rfeh.es
Rules for classification: 1) points; 2) head-to-head points; 3) head-to-head goal difference; 4) goal difference; 5) number of goals scored

== Play-offs ==
Quarter-finals
Club Egara | 4 | 7 | 11
Taburiente | 0 | 1 | 1
Club de Campo | 3 | 0 | 3
Junior | 1 | 0 | 1
Real Club de Polo | 5 | 6 | 11
Tenis | 0 | 1 | 1
Atlètic Terrassa | 5 | 4 | 9
Complutense | 0 | 1 | 1

Semi-finals
28 May – Madrid
Club Egara | 3
Club de Campo | 2
28 May – Madrid
Real Club de Polo | 3
Atlètic Terrassa | 2

Final
29 May – Madrid
Club Egara (s.o.) | 2 (5)
Real Club de Polo | 2 (4)

== Top goalscorers ==
| # | Player | Goals | Team |
|---|---|---|---|
| 1 | (Argentina) Leandro Tolini | 25 | Club de Campo |
| 2 | (Spain) Xavier Aguilar | 14 | Club Egara |
| 2 | (Spain) Peio Azkoaga | 14 | Atlético San Sebastián |
| 2 | (Spain) Xavi Lleonart | 14 | R.C. Polo |
| 5 | (Wales) Rufus Mcnaught-Barrington | 13 | R.S. Tenis |
| 6 | (Argentina) Joaquín Menini | 11 | Club de Campo |
| 6 | (Spain) Salva Piera | 11 | R.C. Polo |
| 8 | (Spain) David Alegre | 10 | R.C. Polo |
| 8 | (Spain) Toshio Aoki | 10 | Taburiente ACE G.C. |

== See also ==
- 2015–16 División de Honor Femenina de Hockey Hierba
