= 2017–18 División de Honor de Hockey Hierba =

2017–18 season of the highest level Spanish field hockey league

División de Honor
- Season: 2017–18
- Dates: 23 September 2017 – 3 June 2018
- Champions: Real Club de Polo
- Premiers: Real Club de Polo
- Relegated: Complutense; Atletico San Sebastián
- Euro Hockey League: Real Club de Polo; Club Egara; Junior
- Matches: 90
- Goals: 418 (4.64 per match)
- Biggest home win: Real Club de Polo 11–0 C.D. Terrassa; Junior 11–0 Tenis
- Biggest away win: Atletico San Sebastián 1–5 Club Egara
- Highest scoring: Real Club de Polo 11–0 C.D. Terrassa; Junior 11–0 Tenis

The 2017–18 División de Honor de Hockey Hierba was the 52nd season of the División de Honor de Hockey Hierba, the highest field hockey league in Spain. The season began on 23 September 2017 and concluded on 3 June 2018.

Atlètic Terrassa were the defending champions. Real Club de Polo won the regular season and their fifteenth national title by defeating Junior 3–1 after shootouts in the final.

== Teams ==
Location of teams in the 2017–18 División de Honor
Location of Province of Barcelona teams in 2017–18 División de Honor

Team	Location	Stadium
Atlético San Sebastián	San Sebastián	Bidebieta
Atlètic Terrassa	Terrassa	Josep Marques
Barcelona	Barcelona	Pau Negre Stadium
CD Terassa	Matadepera	Les Pedritxes
Club de Campo	Madrid	Club de Campo
Club Egara	Terrassa	Pla del Bonaire
Complutense	San Sebastián de los Reyes	San Sebastián de los Reyes
Junior	Sant Cugat del Vallès	Sant Cugat
Real Club de Polo	Barcelona	Eduardo Dualde
Tenis	Santander	Ruth Beita

=== Number of teams by autonomous community ===
Autonomous Community	Number of teams	Teams
Catalonia	6	Atlètic Terrassa, C.D. Terrassa, Club Egara, FC Barcelona, Junior and Real Club de Polo
Madrid	2	Club de Campo and Complutense
Basque Country	1	Atlético San Sebastián
Cantabria	1	Tenis
Total	10	

== Regular season ==
=== League table ===
Pos	Team	Pld	W	D	L	GF	GA	GD	Pts	Qualification or relegation
1	Real Club de Polo (C)	18	15	1	2	60	24	+36	46	Qualification for the Euro Hockey League and play-offs
2	Junior	18	10	6	2	53	30	+23	36	Qualification for the Euro Hockey League and play-offs
3	Club de Campo	18	10	5	3	59	36	+23	35	Qualification for the play-offs
4	Club Egara	18	9	5	4	40	29	+11	32	Qualification for the Euro Hockey League and play-offs (Note: Club Egara qualified for the Euro Hockey League by winning the 2018 Copa del Rey.)
5	Atlètic Terrassa	18	7	6	5	54	37	+17	27	Qualification for the play-offs
6	Barcelona	18	6	3	9	38	47	−9	21	Qualification for the play-offs
7	CD Terrassa	18	5	4	9	34	54	−20	19	Qualification for the play-offs
8	Tenis	18	4	2	12	29	58	−29	14	Qualification for the play-offs
9	Complutense (R)	18	3	4	11	32	48	−16	13	Qualification for the relegation playoff
10	Atletico San Sebastián (R)	18	1	4	13	19	55	−36	7	Relegation to the División de Honor Masculina B

Source: RFEH
(C) Champions; (R) Relegated

=== Results ===
Home \ Away	ATS	ATL	CDT	CDC	EGA	FCB	JNR	RCP	RST	SPV
Atletico San Sebastián	—	3–5	1–0	1–3	1–5	1–1	1–3	0–3	1–1	1–1
Atlètic Terrassa	5–0	—	5–1	3–3	3–3	7–3	1–2	0–1	8–2	2–2
CD Terrassa	2–1	2–2	—	3–5	1–4	3–3	3–2	2–3	1–3	4–4
Club de Campo	8–1	3–3	3–3	—	5–1	5–2	5–1	2–3	3–1	2–0
Club Egara	1–0	2–2	1–2	1–1	—	2–0	2–2	1–3	2–0	5–1
Barcelona	2–1	3–1	2–1	4–1	1–3	—	1–2	4–5	4–2	1–1
Junior	3–3	2–0	3–1	2–2	1–1	4–0	—	4–2	11–0	4–3
Real Club de Polo	6–1	3–1	11–0	4–0	2–3	2–1	1–1	—	4–2	3–1
Tenis	2–1	0–2	1–2	1–4	3–1	5–4	2–2	0–2	—	2–3
Complutense	4–1	2–4	0–3	2–4	1–2	1–2	2–4	1–2	3–2	—

Source: RFEH
Legend: Blue = home team win; Yellow = draw; Red = away team win.

== Play-offs ==
Quarter-finals
Real Club de Polo	5	5	10
Tenis	2	2	4
Club Egara	0	1	1
Atlètic Terrassa	2	0	2
Junior	2	4	6
CD Terrassa	1	0	1
Club de Campo	3	6	9
Barcelona	0	1	1

Semi-finals
2 June 2018
Real Club de Polo	1
Atlètic Terrassa	0
2 June 2018
Junior	3
Club de Campo	2

Final
3 June 2018
Real Club de Polo	2 (3)
Junior	2 (1)

=== Relegation play-off ===
==== 1st leg ====
20 May 2018

Complutense	2–1	Jolaseta

==== 2nd leg ====
26 May 2018

Jolaseta	2–1	Complutense

==== 3rd leg ====
27 May 2018

Jolaseta	2–0	Complutense

Jolaseta won the decisive third match so they are promoted and SPV Complutense is relegated to the second division.
