= 2018–19 Copa del Rey de Hockey Hierba =

2019 Copa del Rey de Hockey Hierba
Tournament details
- Host country: Spain
- City: Madrid
- Dates: 22–24 March
- Teams: 8
- Venue(s): Club de Campo

Final positions
- Champions: Real Club de Polo (30th title)
- Runner-up: Atlètic Terrassa
- Third place: Club Egara

Tournament statistics
- Matches played: 8
- Goals scored: 36 (4.5 per match)
- Top scorer(s): (Argentina) Alan Andino (Spain) Pere Divorra (3 goals)

The 2019 Copa del Rey de Hockey Hierba is the 102nd edition of the Copa del Rey de Hockey Hierba, Spain's annual field hockey cup competition. It was held from 22 to 24 March at Club de Campo in Madrid.

The eight best teams from the first half of the 2018–19 División de Honor will participate in the tournament. The participating teams are Real Club de Polo, Atlètic Terrassa, Club Egara, the hosts Club de Campo, Junior, CD Terrassa, Tenis and Jolaseta. Club Egara are the defending champions, having won the 2017–18 edition. However they were beaten in the semi-finals by the eventual champions Real Club de Polo 5–4 after a shoot-out.

Real Club de Polo won a record-extending 30th title by defeating Atlètic Terrassa 3–1 in the final.

== Results ==
The draw took place on 29 January 2019.

=== Bracket ===
Quarter-finals
22 March
Tenis	1
Jolaseta	2
22 March
Junior	1
Atlètic Terrassa	3
22 March
Club de Campo	1
Club Egara	3
22 March
CD Terrassa	1
Real Club de Polo	5

Semi-finals
23 March
Jolaseta	0
Atlètic Terrassa	4
23 March
Club Egara	2 (4)
Real Club de Polo (p.s.o.)	2 (5)

Final
24 March
Atlètic Terrassa	1
Real Club de Polo	3
Third place
24 March
Jolaseta	0
Club Egara	7

=== Quarter-finals ===
22 March 2019
10:45

Tenis	1–2	Jolaseta

22 March 2019
13:00

Junior	1–3	Atlètic Terrassa

22 March 2019
15:00

Club de Campo	1–3	Club Egara

22 March 2019
16:45

CD Terrassa	1–5	Real Club de Polo

=== Semi-finals ===
23 March 2019
11:00

Jolaseta	0–4	Atlètic Terrassa

23 March 2019
13:00

Club Egara	2–2	Real Club de Polo
Penalties
	4–5

=== Third and fourth place ===
23 March 2019
09:00

Jolaseta	0–7	Club Egara

=== Final ===
23 March 2019
11:00

Atlètic Terrassa	1–3	Real Club de Polo
