= 2013–14 División de Honor Femenina de Hockey Hierba =

2013–14 División de Honor Femenina
Tournament details
- Dates: September 29–December 19 (regular season); March 2–April 13 (2nd stage); May 11–June 1 (final stage) –
- Teams: 12

Final positions
- Champions: Club de Campo (18th title)
- Runner-up: Real Sociedad

Tournament summary
- Matches played: 96
- Goals scored: 328 (3.42 per match)
- Most goals: María Romagosa, 14 goals

The 2013–14 División de Honor Femenina is the 75th season of the top flight of the Spanish domestic women's field hockey competitions since its inception in 1934. It began in autumn 2013 and will finish around early June.

The defending champions were Real Sociedad, while R.S. Tenis and Castelldefels were the teams promoted from División de Honor B.

Club de Campo became champions by winning the final series 2-1 after a home defeat and two away wins in San Sebastián.

== Competition ==
=== Format ===
Competition format changes for 2013–14 season. The competition it divides in three stages; regular season, 2nd stage and playoffs. Regular season comprises 11 matchdays played from October to March through a one-leg format. When regular season finish, table splits into two groups of 6 teams each; in Group 1, top four teams qualify for final stage, while in the Group B, bottom three teams are relegated to División de Honor B. Points during regular season/2nd stage are awarded as follows:

- 2 points for a win
- 1 point for a draw

== Teams ==
División de Honor de Hockey Hierba Femenino 2013–14 teams
Canary Islands

| Team | Stadium | Capacity | City/Area |
|---|---|---|---|
| Real Sociedad | Campo de Hockey Bera Bera | 100 | San Sebastián |
| Club de Campo | Instalaciones Club de Campo | 500 | Madrid |
| SPV'51 | Campo Municipal de Hockey | 200 | S.S. de los Reyes |
| Júnior | Instal·lacions Club Júnior | 800 | Sant Cugat del Vallès |
| R.C. de Polo | Camp d'hoquei Eduardo Dualde | 600 | Barcelona |
| Club Egara | Pla del Bon Aire | 800 | Terrassa |
| Taburiente ACE G.C. | Campo de Hockey Gran Canaria | 100 | Las Palmas de G.C. |
| Alcalá | Campo Municipal de Hockey | 500 | Alcalá la Real |
| Atlètic Terrassa | Camp d'hoquei Josep Marquès | 1,000 | Terrassa |
| CD Terrassa | Instal·lacions CD Terrassa | 400 | Terrassa |
| R.S. Tenis | Campo de Hockey La Albericia | 100 | Santander |
| Castelldefels | Camp Esportiu Municipal Via Fèrria | 50 | Castelldefels |

== Standings ==
=== Regular season ===
| | Team | Pld | W | D | L | PF | PA | Dif | Pts |
|---|---|---|---|---|---|---|---|---|---|
| 1 | Real Sociedad | 11 | 9 | 1 | 1 | 36 | 5 | 31 | 19 |
| 2 | Júnior | 11 | 9 | 0 | 2 | 32 | 10 | 22 | 18 |
| 3 | Club de Campo | 11 | 6 | 4 | 1 | 23 | 11 | 12 | 16 |
| 4 | R.C. de Polo | 11 | 6 | 3 | 2 | 26 | 16 | 10 | 15 |
| 5 | Atlètic Terrassa | 11 | 6 | 2 | 3 | 23 | 23 | 0 | 14 |
| 6 | Club Egara | 11 | 6 | 1 | 4 | 22 | 15 | 7 | 13 |
| 7 | R.S. Tenis | 11 | 4 | 3 | 4 | 13 | 19 | −5 | 11 |
| 8 | Taburiente ACE G.C. | 11 | 4 | 1 | 6 | 16 | 21 | −5 | 9 |
| 9 | SPV'51 | 11 | 3 | 2 | 6 | 19 | 15 | 4 | 8 |
| 10 | Castelldefels | 11 | 2 | 1 | 8 | 13 | 32 | −19 | 5 |
| 11 | CD Terrassa | 11 | 2 | 0 | 9 | 11 | 26 | −15 | 4 |
| 12 | Alcalá | 11 | 0 | 0 | 11 | 4 | 45 | −41 | 0 |

Source: Real Federación Española de Hockey

| Championship group |
| Relegation group |

=== 2nd stage ===
==== Championship group ====
In the 2nd stage, teams advance with points obtained in regular season against the same group teams.

| | Team | Pld | W | D | L | PF | PA | Dif | Pts |
|---|---|---|---|---|---|---|---|---|---|
| 1 | Real Sociedad | 10 | 4 | 5 | 1 | 15 | 6 | 9 | 13 |
| 2 | Club de Campo | 10 | 4 | 5 | 1 | 16 | 13 | 3 | 13 |
| 3 | R.C. de Polo | 10 | 3 | 5 | 2 | 17 | 16 | 1 | 11 |
| 4 | Júnior | 10 | 4 | 1 | 5 | 16 | 16 | 0 | 9 |
| 5 | Club Egara | 10 | 2 | 4 | 4 | 12 | 14 | −2 | 8 |
| 6 | Atlètic Terrassa | 10 | 1 | 5 | 5 | 10 | 21 | −11 | 6 |

| Final stage |

==== Relegation group ====
In the 2nd stage, teams advance with points obtained in regular season against the same group teams.

| | Team | Pld | W | D | L | PF | PA | Dif | Pts |
|---|---|---|---|---|---|---|---|---|---|
| 1 | Taburiente ACE G.C. | 10 | 7 | 2 | 1 | 20 | 8 | 12 | 16 |
| 2 | R.S. Tenis | 10 | 5 | 4 | 1 | 13 | 9 | 4 | 14 |
| 3 | SPV'51 | 10 | 6 | 1 | 3 | 31 | 11 | 20 | 13 |
| 4 | CD Terrassa | 10 | 3 | 2 | 5 | 18 | 17 | 1 | 8 |
| 5 | Alcalá | 10 | 3 | 0 | 7 | 13 | 27 | −14 | 6 |
| 6 | Castelldefels | 10 | 1 | 1 | 8 | 11 | 34 | −23 | 3 |

| Relegation playoff |
| Relegated |

== Final stage ==
Semifinals
1 | Real Sociedad | 2 | 0 | 1^{(2p)}
4 | Júnior | 1 | 2 | 1^{(1p)}
2 | Club de Campo | 3^{(2p)} | 2
3 | R.C. Polo | 3^{(1p)} | 1

Final
1 | Real Sociedad | 1^{(6p)} | 1 | 0
2 | Club de Campo | 1^{(5p)} | 3 | 2

=== Semifinals ===
==== 1st leg ====
11 May
12:30 (UTC+2)

| Júnior | 1–2 | Real Sociedad |
|---|---|---|
| Guinea | Report | Ybarra; Poli Guajardo |

Instal·lacions Club Júnior, Sant Cugat del Vallès

11 May
12:30 (UTC+2)

| R.C. Polo | 3–3 | Club de Campo |
|---|---|---|
| Segú; Piñeiro ¿? | Report | Magaz; Iglesias |
Penalties
| | 1–2 |

Eduardo Dualde, Barcelona

==== 2nd leg ====
17 May
13:00 (UTC+2)

| Club de Campo | 2–1 | R.C. Polo |
|---|---|---|
| Magaz; Iglesias | Report | Closa |

Instalaciones Club de Campo, Madrid

Club de Campo won series 2–0 and advanced to Final.

17 May
13:00 (UTC+2)

| Real Sociedad | 0–2 | Júnior |
|---|---|---|
| | Report | Riba; Guinea |

Campo de Hockey Bera Bera, San Sebastián

==== 3rd leg ====
18 May
12:30 (UTC+2)

| Real Sociedad | 1–1 | Júnior |
|---|---|---|
| Casale 27' | Report | Gil 16' |
Penalties
| | 2–1 |

Campo de Hockey Bera Bera, San Sebastián

Real Sociedad won series 2–1 and advanced to Final.

=== Final ===
==== 1st leg ====
24 May
13:00 (UTC+2)

| Club de Campo | 1–1 | Real Sociedad |
|---|---|---|
| Abelairas 16' | Report | Maraña 45' |
Penalties
| | 5–6 |

Instalaciones Club de Campo, Madrid

==== 2nd leg ====
31 May
13:00 (UTC+2)

| Real Sociedad | 1–3 | Club de Campo |
|---|---|---|
| Poli Guajardo 16' | Report | López 30'; Malda |

Campo de Hockey Bera Bera, San Sebastián

Series tied 1–1.

==== 3rd leg ====
1 June
12:30 (UTC+2)

| Real Sociedad | 0–2 | Club de Campo |
|---|---|---|
| | Report | Iglesias 41'; López 58' |

Campo de Hockey Bera Bera, San Sebastián

2013–14 División de Honor Femenina winners
(Community of Madrid)
Club de Campo
Eighteenth title

== Relegation playoff ==
| Team 1 | Agg. | Team 2 | 1st leg | 2nd leg |
|---|---|---|---|---|
| SPV'51 (Community of Madrid) | 8–1 | (Community of Madrid) Pozuelo | 1–1 | 7–0 |

=== 1st leg ===
18 May
11:00 (UTC+2)

| Pozuelo | 1–1 | SPV'51 |
|---|---|---|
| Portugal 19' | Report | García 30' |

Complejo Deportivo Somontes, Campo 2, Madrid

=== 2nd leg ===
25 May
13:00 (UTC+2)

| SPV'51 | 7–0 | Pozuelo |
|---|---|---|
| Riera 4'; Vitón; Lorenzo | Report |

Campo Municipal de Hockey, S.S. de los Reyes

SPV'51 won 8–1 on aggregate and remained in División de Honor.

== Top goalscorers ==
- Regular season/2nd stage only.

| Player | Goals | Team |
|---|---|---|
| (Spain) María Romagosa | 16 | Júnior |
| (Spain) Lola Riera | 13 | SPV'51 |
| (Spain) Bárbara Malda | 11 | Club de Campo |
| (Spain) Carola Salvatella | 11 | Club Egara |
| (Australia) Stephanie Riordan | 10 | Júnior |
| (Argentina) Soledad Contardi | 9 | R.C. Polo |
| (Spain) Begoña García | 8 | SPV'51 |
| (Spain) María Gómez | 8 | Real Sociedad |
| (Spain) Marta Grau | 8 | Atlètic Terrassa |
| (Spain) María Tost | 8 | Club Egara |

== See also ==
- División de Honor de Hockey Hierba 2013–14
