= Marc Recasens =

Spanish field hockey player (born 1999)

Personal information
- Full name: Marc Recasens Llobet
- Born: 13 September 1999 (age 26) Barcelona, Spain
- Height: 1.77 m (5 ft 10 in)
- Weight: 76 kg (168 lb)

Sport
- Sport: Field hockey
- Position: Defender
- Club: Dragons
Youth career
- Team
- –: Club Egara
Senior career
| Years | Team | Caps | Goals |
| –2023 | Club Egara | - | - |
| 2023–2024 | Real Club de Polo | - | - |
| 2024–2026 | Rotterdam | - | - |
| 2026–present | Dragons | - | - |
National team
| Years | Team | Caps | Goals |
| 2019 | Spain U21 | 10 | (0) |
| 2019–present | Spain | 125 | (10) |
Medal record
Men's field hockey
Representing Spain
World Cup
| Silver medal – second place | 2026 Wavre/Amstelveen |
EuroHockey Championship
| Bronze medal – third place | 2025 Mönchengladbach |
- Updated on 10 June 2026

Marc Recasens Llobet (Note: In this Spanish name, the first or paternal surname is Recasens and the second or maternal family name is Llobet.) (born 13 September 1999) is a Spanish field hockey player who plays as a defender for Belgian Hockey League club Dragons and the Spain national team.

== Club career ==
Recasens played in the youth for Club Egara and played for the senior team until 2023, when he left Egara to play for Real Club de Polo. After the 2024 Summer Olympics, he moved to the Netherlands to play for Rotterdam. In February 2026, it was announced he would leave Rotterdam for Dragons in Belgium, partly because of the language barrier. In the remainder of the 2025–26 season, he would win the Hoofdklasse with Rotterdam.

== International career ==
Recasens made his debut for the senior national team in March 2019 in a test match against Chile. On 25 May 2021, he was selected in the squad for the 2021 EuroHockey Championship, his first senior tournament. He competed in the 2020 Summer Olympics. He made his World Cup debut at the 2023 Men's FIH Hockey World Cup.

== Honours ==
=== Club ===
Club Egara

- División de Honor: 2018–19
- Copa del Rey: 2017–18, 2020–21

Real Club de Polo

- Copa del Rey: 2023–24

Rotterdam

- Hoofdklasse: 2025–26
