= Jordi Bonastre =

Spanish field hockey player (born 2000)

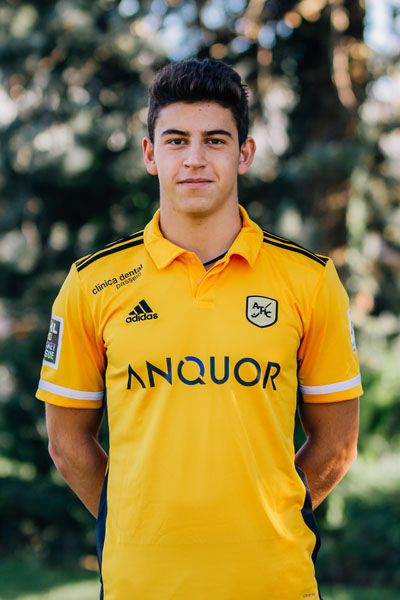

Personal information
- Full name: Jordi Bonastre Company
- Born: 7 August 2000 (age 26)

Sport
- Sport: Field hockey
- Position: Defender / Midfielder
- Club: Atlètic Terrassa
National team
Years	Team	Caps	Goals
2019–2021	Spain U21	12	(1)
2020–present	Spain (indoor)	5	(5)
2022–present	Spain	33	(4)
Medal record
World Cup
Silver medal – second place	2026 Wavre/Amstelveen
EuroHockey Championships
Bronze medal – third place	2025 Mönchengladbach
- Updated on 1 February 2023

Jordi Bonastre Company (born 7 August 2000) is a Spanish field hockey player who plays as a defender or midfielder for División de Honor club Atlètic Terrassa and the Spain national team.

== Club career ==
In the Spanish División de Honor, Bonastre plays for Atlètic Terrassa.

== International career ==
=== Under–21 ===
Bonastre made his debut for the Spain under-21 team in 2019 during an eight–nations tournament in Madrid. He went on to represent the team later that year at the EuroHockey Junior Championship in Valencia where the team finished 4th.

In 2021 he captained the team at the FIH Junior World Cup in Bhubaneswar.

=== Los Redsticks ===
In 2022 Jordi Bonastre made his debut for Los Redsticks in a test match against the Netherlands in Cádiz. He was later named in the national squad for season three of the FIH Pro League. He made his World Cup debut at the 2023 Men's FIH Hockey World Cup.

== Honours ==
Atlètic Terrassa

- División de Honor: 2021–22
- Copa del Rey: 2021–22
