= Mario Garín =

Spanish field hockey player

Personal information
- Full name: Mario Garín Fernández
- Born: 26 April 1992 (age 34) Santander, Spain
- Height: 1.80 m (5 ft 11 in)
- Weight: 80 kg (176 lb)

Sport
- Sport: Field hockey
- Position: Goalkeeper
- Club: Tenis
Youth career
- Years: Team
- 2002–2008: Tenis
Senior career
Years	Team	Caps	Goals
2008–2014	Tenis	-	-
2014–2015	Complutense	-	-
2015–2019	Real Club de Polo	-	-
2019–2022	Club de Campo	-	-
2022–present	Tenis	-	-
National team
Years	Team	Caps	Goals
2013–present	Spain	89	(0)
Medal record
Men's field hockey
Representing Spain
EuroHockey Championship
Silver medal – second place	2019 Antwerp
- Updated on 27 January 2023

Mario Garín Fernández (born 26 April 1992) is a Spanish field hockey player who plays as a goalkeeper for División de Honor club El Tenis and the Spanish national team.

== Club career ==
Garín played for RS Tenis and Complutense before he joined Real Club de Polo in 2015. He left Real Club de Polo in 2019 to play for Club de Campo. In 2022 returned to his boyhood club El Tenis.

== International career ==
Garín made his debut for the senior national team in 2013. He represented Spain at the 2018 World Cup. At the 2019 EuroHockey Championship, he won his first medal with the senior team as they finished second. On 25 May 2021, he was selected in the squad for the 2021 EuroHockey Championship.
