= Bosco Pérez-Pla =

Spanish field hockey player (born 1987)

Personal information
- Full name: Bosco Pérez-Pla de Alvear
- Born: 26 September 1987 (age 38) Madrid, Spain
- Height: 1.80 m (5 ft 11 in)
- Weight: 78 kg (172 lb)

Sport
- Sport: Field hockey
- Position: Defender
Youth career
- Team
- –: Club de Campo
Senior career
Years	Team	Caps	Goals
2004–2013	Club de Campo	-	-
2013–2014	Ranchi Rhinos	-	-
2013–2015	HGC	-	-
2015–2021	Club de Campo	-	-
2021–2022	Leuven	-	-
National team
Years	Team	Caps	Goals
–	Spain	142	-
Medal record
Men's field hockey
Representing Spain
Champions Trophy
Silver medal – second place	2011 Auckland
EuroHockey Junior Championship
Gold medal – first place	2008 San Sebastián

Bosco Pérez-Pla de Alvear (born 26 September 1987) is a Spanish former field hockey player who played as a defender a total of 142 times for the Spanish national team until 2017.

At the 2016 Summer Olympics, he competed for the national team in the men's tournament.

== Club career ==
Born in Madrid Pérez-Pla started playing for Club de Campo at the age of four. In the winter of 2013, Perez-Pla won the first Hockey India League with the Ranchi Rhinos. He left Club de Campo after the 2012–13 season to play for HGC in the Dutch Hoofdklasse. He extended his stay at HGC for one more season in March 2014. After two seasons with HGC he returned to Club de Campo. In the 2020–21 season, he was the captain of the Club de Campo team which won their first ever Spanish national title. After the championship he announced his retirement as a hockey player. This retirement was not final as on 22 August 2021 it was announced he would join Leuven in the Belgian League for one season.

== Honours ==
=== International ===
Spain U21

- EuroHockey Junior Championship: 2008

=== Club ===
Club de Campo

- División de Honor: 2020–21
- Copa del Rey: 2004, 2005, 2011, 2012

Ranchi Rhinos

- Hockey India League: 2013
