= Roc Oliva =

Spanish field hockey player (born 1989)

Personal information
- Full name: Roc Oliva Isern
- Born: 18 July 1989 (age 37) Matadepera, Spain
- Height: 1.80 m (5 ft 11 in)
- Weight: 78 kg (172 lb)

Sport
- Sport: Field hockey
- Position: Midfielder / Forward
Youth career
- Years: Team
- 1993–2005: Atlètic Terrassa
Senior career
Years	Team	Caps	Goals
2005–2012	Atlètic Terrassa	-	-
2012–2014	Amsterdam	-	-
2014–2015	HGC	-	-
2015–2018	Atlètic Terrassa	-	-
2018–2021	Real Club de Polo	-	-
National team
Years	Team	Caps	Goals
2007–2021	Spain	189	(18)
Medal record
Men's field hockey
Representing Spain
Olympic Games
Silver medal – second place	2008 Beijing	Team
EuroHockey Championship
Silver medal – second place	2007 Manchester
Champions Trophy
Silver medal – second place	2008 Rotterdam
Silver medal – second place	2011 Auckland

Roc Oliva Isern (born 18 July 1989), also known as "Metra", is a Spanish former field hockey player who played as a midfielder or forward for the Spanish national team.

Oliva played most of his career for Atlètic Terrassa HC but from the 2018–19 season onwards he played for Real Club de Polo until his retirement in 2021. He also played for Amsterdam and HGC in the Dutch Hoofdklasse. His father Jordi and sister Georgina are also both Olympic hockey players. He played a total of 189 times for the Spanish national team from 2007 until 2021.

== International career ==
Oliva was a member of the Spanish National Team that claimed the silver medal at the 2008 Summer Olympics in Beijing, PR China. He also competed at the 2012 and 2016 Olympics. After the 2016 Olympic Games, he did play for the national team for three years. In October 2019, he was brought back into the national team for the 2019 Men's FIH Olympic Qualifiers. On 25 May 2021, he was selected in the squad for the 2021 EuroHockey Championship. On 28 May 2021 he had to withdraw from the squad because of his imminent fatherhood. He returned in the national team for the 2020 Summer Olympics, after the Olympics he retired as a hockey player.
