= 2021 Men's Euro Hockey League Ranking Cup =

2021 Euro Hockey League Cup
Ranking Cup

Tournament details
- Host country: Belgium
- City: Brasschaat
- Dates: 30 September – 3 October 2021
- Teams: 16 (from 11 associations)
- Venue(s): KHC Dragons

Tournament statistics
- Matches played: 12
- Goals scored: 70 (5.83 per match)
- Top scorer(s): (Netherlands) Bjorn Kellerman (4 goals)

The 2021 Euro Hockey League Cup was the first edition of the Ranking Cup, a secondary competition to Europe's premier club field hockey tournament, the Euro Hockey League. The tournament, organized by the European Hockey Federation, was held in Brasschaat, Belgium, from 30 September to 3 October 2021.

== Format ==
As a secondary tournament to the Euro Hockey League, the Ranking Cup was created to determine the placings of the lower ranked teams for the 2020–21 EHL Season.

The tournament comprised 16 teams, competing in a round of 16 format. The victorious teams from the first knockout games went on to compete in the placement matches for fifth to twelfth place. The losing teams contested ranking matches to determine thirteenth to twentieth places.

=== Original format ===
The tournament was originally scheduled to comprise eight teams in a knockout format, with the remaining 12 to appear at the Euro Hockey League. Due to the COVID-19 pandemic however, the EHL was rescheduled and reduced to four teams, with the remaining eight teams being added to the Ranking Cup.

== Results ==
=== Bracket ===
Knockout 16
30 September
(Scotland) Grange	0
(Austria) Arminen (w/o)	5
30 September
(Russia) Dinamo Elektrostal	2
(Netherlands) Kampong	5
30 September
(Netherlands) Den Bosch	6
(France) Saint Germain	0
30 September
(Belgium) Gantoise	4 (3)
(Spain) Club de Campo (s.o.)	4 (4)
2 October
(Germany) Mannheimer HC (s.o.)	2 (2)
(England) Hampstead & Westminster	2 (0)
2 October
(Belarus) Minsk	5
(Ireland) Three Rock Rovers	4
2 October
(Russia) Dinamo Ak-Bars	0
(Germany) Rot-Weiss Köln (w/o)	5
2 October
(Belgium) Dragons (s.o.)	1 (3)
(England) Surbiton	1 (1)

Knockout 8
1 October
(Austria) Arminen	1
(Netherlands) Kampong	5
1 October
(Netherlands) Den Bosch	3
(Spain) Club de Campo	2
3 October
(Germany) Mannheimer HC	5
(Belarus) Minsk	1
3 October
(Germany) Rot-Weiss Köln	1
(Belgium) Dragons	5

==== Round of 16 ====
30 September 2021
12:45

Grange (Scotland)	0–5	(Austria) Arminen
	Grange forfeit the match. Report

30 September 2021
15:00

Elektrostal (Russia)	2–5	(Netherlands) Kampong
Dvoretskii 1', 40'	Report	Kempermann 13'; Janssen 26'; Lageman 32'; Kellerman 54', 58'

Umpires:
Alex Fedenczuk (SCO)
Andrés Ortíz (ESP)

30 September 2021
17:15

Den Bosch (Netherlands)	6–0	(France) Saint Germain
Smith 30'; Wotherspoon 31'; Bijen 49', 55'; Boers 56', 59'	Report

Umpires:
Bruce Bale (ENG)
Shane O'Donnell (IRE)

30 September 2021
19:30

Gantoise (Belgium)	4–4	(Spain) Club de Campo
Kina 29'; Scheen 46'; Masson 58'; Bugallo 60'	Report	Lacalle 14'; Basterra 16', 25'; Iglesias 56'
Penalties
Bugallo (penalty shoot-out missed); Masson (penalty shoot-out missed); Tynevez (penalty shoot-out scored); Kina (penalty shoot-out scored); Ferreiro (penalty shoot-out scored)	3–4	(penalty shoot-out scored) Iglesias; (penalty shoot-out scored) Abajo; (penalty shoot-out missed) L. García; (penalty shoot-out scored) Basterra; (penalty shoot-out scored) Zorita

Umpires:
Maarten Boxma (NED)
Tim Meissner (GER)

2 October 2021
09:30

Minsk (Belarus)	5–4	(Ireland) Three Rock Rovers
Belavusau 22', 24', 34'; Hancharou 45'; Paulovich 52'	Report	Johnson 21'; Morris 25'; Spencer 40'; Haughton 55'

Umpires:
Daniel Rodríguez (ESP)
Tim Meissner (GER)

2 October 2021
11:45

Mannheimer (Germany)	2–2	(England) Hampstead & Westminster
Schachner 58'; Peillat 60'	Report	Guise-Brown 14', 59'
Penalties
Fischer (penalty shoot-out missed); Hartkopf (penalty shoot-out scored); Weigand (penalty shoot-out missed); Müller (penalty shoot-out missed); Barreiros (penalty shoot-out scored)	2–0	(penalty shoot-out missed) Calnan; (penalty shoot-out missed) Shipperley; (penalty shoot-out missed) Käppeler; (penalty shoot-out missed) French

Umpires:
Michael Detrieux (BEL)
Alex Fedenczuk (SCO)

2 October 2021
14:00

Dinamo Ak-Bars (Russia)	0–5	(Germany) Rot-Weiss Köln
	Dinamo Ak-Bars forfeit the match. Report

2 October 2021
16:15

Dragons (Belgium)	1–1	(England) Surbiton
Crols 34'	Report	Taylor 42'
Penalties
Denayer (penalty shoot-out scored); Raes (penalty shoot-out scored); Rubens (penalty shoot-out scored)	3–1	(penalty shoot-out missed) Spencer; (penalty shoot-out missed) Goodfield; (penalty shoot-out missed) Golden; (penalty shoot-out missed) Sorsby

Umpires:
Andrés Ortíz (ESP)
Maarten Boxma (NED)

=== Ranking matches ===
==== Thirteenth to twentieth places ====
1 October 2021
12:45

Grange (Scotland)	0–5	(Russia) Elektrostal
	Grange forfeit the match. Report

1 October 2021
17:15

Saint Germain (France)	2–4	(Belgium) Gantoise
Parrilla 45+'; Jeammot 59'	Report	Scheen 11', 46'; Bugallo 16'; Tynevez 58'

Umpires:
Shane O'Donnell (IRE)
Daniel Rodríguez (ESP)

3 October 2021
09:30

Hampstead & Westminster (England)	4–1	(Ireland) Three Rock Rovers
Guise-Brown 17'; Kelly 17'; Ramshaw 24'; Sharp 51'	Report	Hosking 28'

Umpires:
Daniel Rodríguez (ESP)
Michael Detrieux (BEL)

3 October 2021
14:00

Dinamo Ak-Bars (Russia)	0–5	(England) Surbiton
	Dinamo Ak-Bars forfeit the match. Report

==== Fifth to twelfth places ====
1 October 2021
15:00

Arminen (Austria)	1–5	(Netherlands) Kampong
R. Bele 13'	Report	De Geus 20'; Kellerman 26', 47'; Dobbelaar 29'; Janssen 57'

Umpires:
Michael Detrieux (BEL)
Tim Meissner (GER)

1 October 2021
19:30

Den Bosch (Netherlands)	3–2	(Spain) Club de Campo
Versteeg 9'; Van der Horst 23'; Reyenga 56'	Report	Lacalle 15'; Basterra 57'

Umpires:
Bruce Bale (ENG)
Alex Fedenczuk (SCO)

3 October 2021
11:45

Mannheimer (Germany)	5–1	(Belarus) Minsk
Peillat 12'; Hartkopf 24'; Zmyslony 54'; Schachner 56'; Weigand 58'	Report	Staradub 55'

Umpires:
Shane O'Donnell (IRE)
Andrés Ortíz (ESP)

3 October 2021
16:15

Rot-Weiss Köln (Germany)	1–5	(Belgium) Dragons
Mazkour 18'	Report	Della Torre 19'; Cobbaert 25'; Denayer 32', 47'; Rubens 51'

Umpires:
Maarten Boxma (NED)
Bruce Bale (ENG)

== Final standings ==
- 5. (Belgium) Dragons
- 5. (Netherlands) Den Bosch
- 5. (Netherlands) Kampong
- 5. (Germany) Mannheimer
- 9. (Austria) Arminen
- 9. (Belarus) Minsk
- 9. (Germany) Rot-Weiss Köln
- 9. (Spain) Club de Campo
- 13. (Belgium) Gantoise
- 13. (England) Hampstead & Westminster
- 13. (England) Surbiton
- 13. (Russia) Elektrostal
- 17. (France) Saint Germain
- 17. (Ireland) Three Rock Rovers
- 17. (Russia) Dinamo Ak-Bars
- 17. (Scotland) Grange
