= Alejandro Alonso (field hockey) =

Spanish field hockey player (born 1999)

Personal information
- Full name: Alejandro Francisco Alonso Gancedo
- Born: 14 February 1999 (age 27) Santander, Cantabria, Spain
- Height: 1.79 m (5 ft 10 in)
- Weight: 79 kg (174 lb)

Sport
- Sport: Field hockey
- Position: Defender
- Club: Tenis
Senior career
Years	Team	Caps	Goals
2017–present	Tenis	-	-
National team
Years	Team	Caps	Goals
2017–2019	Spain U21	14	(1)
2020–present	Spain (indoor)	5	(0)
2021–present	Spain	56	(3)
Medal record
World Cup
Silver medal – second place	2026 Wavre/Amstelveen
EuroHockey Championships
Bronze medal – third place	2025 Mönchengladbach
- Updated on 31 January 2023

Alejandro Francisco Alonso Gancedo (born 14 February 1999) is a Spanish field hockey player who plays as a defender for División de Honor club Tenis and the Spanish national team.

== International career ==
Alonso made his debut for the senior national team in February 2021 in a FIH Pro League match against Belgium. On 25 May 2021, he was selected in the squad for the 2021 EuroHockey Championship, his first senior tournament. He also competed in the 2020 Summer Olympics. He made his World Cup debut at the 2023 Men's FIH Hockey World Cup.
