= Viçens Ruiz =

Spanish field hockey player

Personal information
- Full name: Viçens Ruiz Torruela
- Born: 31 October 1991 (age 34) Terrassa, Spain
- Height: 1.81 m (5 ft 11 in)
- Weight: 70 kg (154 lb)

Sport
- Sport: Field hockey
- Position: Midfielder
- Club: Real Club de Polo
Senior career
| Years | Team | Caps | Goals |
| –2016 | Club Egara | - | - |
| 2016–2017 | HGC | - | - |
| 2017–2019 | Club Egara | - | - |
| 2019–present | Real Club de Polo | - | - |
National team
| Years | Team | Caps | Goals |
| 2013–present | Spain | 169 | (12) |
Medal record
Men's field hockey
Representing Spain
EuroHockey Championship
| Silver medal – second place | 2019 Antwerp |
- Updated on 24 July 2021

Viçens Ruiz Torruela (born 31 October 1991) is a Spanish field hockey player who plays as a midfielder for Real Club de Polo and the Spanish national team.

At the 2016 Summer Olympics, he competed for the national team in the men's tournament.

== Club career ==
Ruiz played for Club Egara until 2016 when he moved to the Netherlands to play for HGC. He only played there for one season and returned to Club Egara. In 2019, after he won the Spanish national title with Club Egara he left them for Real Club de Polo.

== International career ==
Ruiz has been playing for the national team since 2013 when he made his debut in 2013 EuroHockey Championships. He was part of the Spain squad that finished thirteenth at the 2018 World Cup. He scored one goal in three games in that tournament. At the 2019 EuroHockey Championship, he won his first medal with the national team as they finished second. On 25 May 2021, he was selected in the squad for the 2021 EuroHockey Championship.
