= Diego Arana =

Spanish field hockey player

Personal information
- Full name: Diego Arana Antoñanzas
- Born: 12 September 1988 (age 37) Bilbao, Spain
- Height: 1.77 m (5 ft 10 in)

Sport
- Sport: Field hockey
- Position: Forward
- Club: Jolaseta
Youth career
- Team
- –: Jolaseta
Senior career
Years	Team	Caps	Goals
2005–2011	Jolaseta	-	-
2011–2013	Club de Campo	-	-
2013–2014	Jolaseta	-	-
2014–2016	Braxgata	-	-
2016–2017	Tenis	-	-
2017–2018	Pinoké	-	-
2018–2019	Jolaseta	-	-
2019–2020	Herakles	-	-
2020–present	Jolaseta	-	-
National team
Years	Team	Caps	Goals
2016–present	Spain	57	(13)
Medal record
Men's field hockey
Representing Spain
EuroHockey Championship
Silver medal – second place	2019 Antwerp
- Updated on 28 February 2020

Diego Arana Antoñanzas (born 12 September 1988) is a Spanish field hockey player who plays as a forward for Jolaseta and the Spanish national team.

== Club career ==
Arana played in Spain for Jolaseta and Club de Campo until 2014, when he moved to Belgium to play for Braxgata. In the 2015–16 season he helped them claim their first-ever play-off place in the Men's Belgian Hockey League. After two seasons in Belgium he returned to Spain to play for Tenis. In 2017 he left Spain again, this time he went to the Netherlands to play for Pinoké. After one season with Pinoké he returned to Jolaseta. In June 2019, it was announced he would join Herakles in Belgium for the 2019–20 season. He returned to Jolaseta after a half season to improve his chances for selection in the Spain squad.

== International career ==
Arana made his debut for the senior national team in December 2016 in a test match against Ireland. He represented Spain at the 2018 World Cup. At the 2019 EuroHockey Championship, he won his first medal with the national team as they finished second.
