= David Alegre =

Spanish field hockey player (born 1984)

Personal information
- Full name: David Alegre Biosca
- Born: 6 September 1984 (age 41) Terrassa, Spain
- Height: 1.84 m (6 ft 0 in)
- Weight: 75 kg (165 lb)

Sport
- Sport: Field hockey
- Position: Midfielder
Youth career
- Team
- –: Club Egara
Senior career
| Years | Team | Caps | Goals |
| –2009 | Club Egara | - | - |
| 2009–2011 | Oranje Zwart | - | - |
| 2011–2021 | Real Club de Polo | - | - |
National team
| Years | Team | Caps | Goals |
| 2003–2021 | Spain | 295 | (32) |
Medal record
Men's field hockey
Representing Spain
Olympic Games
| Silver medal – second place | 2008 Beijing | Team |
World Cup
| Bronze medal – third place | 2006 Mönchengladbach |
EuroHockey Championship
| Gold medal – first place | 2005 Leipzig |
| Silver medal – second place | 2007 Manchester |
Champions Trophy
| Gold medal – first place | 2004 Lahore |
| Silver medal – second place | 2008 Rotterdam |
| Silver medal – second place | 2011 Auckland |
| Bronze medal – third place | 2005 Chennai |
| Bronze medal – third place | 2006 Terrassa |

David Alegre Biosca (born 6 September 1984) is a Spanish former field hockey player who played as a midfielder for the Spanish national team.

Alegre was born in Terrassa and started playing hockey at age four at Club Egara and retired in 2021 at Real Club de Polo. He also played for the Uttar Pradesh Wizards and Oranje Zwart. His older brother Ramón was also a field hockey international for Spain. He played a total of 295 times for the Spanish national team from 2003 until 2021.

== Club career ==
David played in Spain for Club Egara until 2009, when moved to the Netherlands to play for Oranje Zwart. After two seasons with Oranje Zwart, he returned to Spain to play for Real Club de Polo. He also represented the Uttar Pradesh Wizards in the Hockey India League.

== International career ==
Alegre made his debut for the Spain national team in 2003 against Germany. He finished in fourth position with the national team at the 2004 Summer Olympics in Athens, Greece, and in sixth at the 2012 Summer Olympics. However, in between he was part of the 2008 Summer Olympics team which won a silver medal. The midfielder has also played in three World Cups. He took a break from the national team in 2016 to focus on his work. After not having played for three years for the national team he returned in the team in October 2019 for the 2019 FIH Olympic Qualifiers. On 25 May 2021, he was selected in the squad for the 2021 EuroHockey Championship. He retired from playing hockey after the 2020 Summer Olympics.
