= Alejandro de Frutos =

Spanish field hockey player

Álex de Frutos
Personal information
- Full name: Alejandro de Frutos Gomez
- Born: 29 September 1992 (age 33) Madrid, Spain
- Height: 1.70 m (5 ft 7 in)

Sport
- Sport: Field hockey
- Position: Midfielder
- Club: Club de Campo
Senior career
Years	Team	Caps	Goals
–2015	Complutense	-	-
2015–	Club de Campo	-	-
National team
Years	Team	Caps	Goals
2013	Spain U21	23	-
2014–	Spain	105	-
Medal record
Men's field hockey
Representing Spain
EuroHockey Championship
Silver medal – second place	2019 Antwerp
- Updated on 27 August 2019

Alejandro "Álex" de Frutos Gomez (born 29 September 1992) is a Spanish field hockey player who plays as a midfielder for Club de Campo and the Spanish national team.

== International career ==
De Frutos made his debut for the senior national team in November 2014 in a test match against Great Britain. He represented Spain at the 2018 World Cup. At the 2019 EuroHockey Championship, he won his first medal with the senior team as they finished second.
