= Salva Piera =

Spanish field hockey player (born 1991)

Salvador Piera
Personal information
- Full name: Salvador Piera Bresca
- Nationality: Spanish
- Born: 18 May 1991 (age 35)
- Height: 1.83 m (6 ft 0 in)
- Weight: 83 kg (183 lb)

Sport
- Country: Spain
- Sport: Field hockey

Salvador Piera Bresca (born 18 May 1991) is a Spanish field hockey player. At the 2016 Summer Olympics, he competed for the national team in the men's tournament.
