= Copa del Rey de Hockey Hierba =

- Sport: Field hockey
- Founded: 1915; 111 years ago
- Administrator: Royal Spanish Hockey Federation
- No. of teams: 8
- Country: Spain
- Most recent champion: Club de Campo (15th title) (2024–25)
- Most titles: Real Club de Polo (32 titles)
- Website: rfeh.es

The Copa del Rey de Hockey Hierba is the second most important competition of field hockey in Spain. It was founded in 1914 and is managed by the Real Federación Española de Hockey.

== Champion by year ==
Year	Champion	Region
1915	Atlético Madrid	(Community of Madrid)
1916	RC Polo	(Catalonia)
1917	RC Polo	(Catalonia)
1918	Real Sociedad	(Basque Country (autonomous community))
1919	Atlético Madrid	(Community of Madrid)
1920	Atlético Madrid	(Community of Madrid)
1921	Club Egara	(Catalonia)
1922	RC Polo	(Catalonia)
1923	Atlético Madrid	(Community of Madrid)
1924	RC Polo	(Catalonia)
1925	RC Polo	(Catalonia)
1926	Atlético Madrid	(Community of Madrid)
1927	Atlético Madrid	(Community of Madrid)
1928	Atlético Madrid	(Community of Madrid)
1929	RC Polo	(Catalonia)
1930	Real Sociedad	(Basque Country (autonomous community))
1931	Valencia	(Valencian Community)
1932	Tranviaria	(Community of Madrid)
1933	Atlètic Terrassa	(Catalonia)
1934	Club de Campo	(Community of Madrid)
1935	Club de Campo	(Community of Madrid)
1936	Club de Campo	(Community of Madrid)
1937–39	not held	-
1940	Club de Campo	(Community of Madrid)
1941	RC Polo	(Catalonia)
1942	FC Barcelona	(Catalonia)
1943	CD Terrassa	(Catalonia)
1944	FC Barcelona	(Catalonia)
1945	CD Terrassa	(Catalonia)
1946	CD Terrassa	(Catalonia)
1947	FC Barcelona	(Catalonia)
1948	CD Terrassa	(Catalonia)
1949	CD Terrassa	(Catalonia)
1950	CD Terrassa	(Catalonia)
1951	CD Terrassa	(Catalonia)
1952	Club Egara	(Catalonia)
1953	Club de Campo	(Community of Madrid)
1954	Club de Campo	(Community of Madrid)
1955	CD Terrassa	(Catalonia)
1956	Club de Campo	(Community of Madrid)

Year	Champion	Region
1957	RC Polo	(Catalonia)
1958	RC Polo	(Catalonia)
1959	RC Polo	(Catalonia)
1960	RC Polo	(Catalonia)
1961	Club Egara	(Catalonia)
1962	RC Polo	(Catalonia)
1963	Club Egara	(Catalonia)
1964	RC Polo	(Catalonia)
1965	Club Egara	(Catalonia)
1966	CD Terrassa	(Catalonia)
1967	CD Terrassa	(Catalonia)
1968	Club Egara	(Catalonia)
1969	Club Egara	(Catalonia)
1970	RC Polo	(Catalonia)
1971	Club Egara	(Catalonia)
1972	Club Egara	(Catalonia)
1973	Club Egara	(Catalonia)
1974	RC Polo	(Catalonia)
1975	CD Terrassa	(Catalonia)
1976	RC Polo	(Catalonia)
1977	Club de Campo	(Community of Madrid)
1978	Club de Campo	(Community of Madrid)
1979	RC Polo	(Catalonia)
1980	RC Polo	(Catalonia)
1981	RC Polo	(Catalonia)
1982	RC Polo	(Catalonia)
1983	RC Polo	(Catalonia)
1984	Atlètic Terrassa	(Catalonia)
1985	Atlètic Terrassa	(Catalonia)
1986	Atlètic Terrassa	(Catalonia)
1987	Atlètic Terrassa	(Catalonia)
1988	Atlètic Terrassa	(Catalonia)
1989	RC Polo	(Catalonia)
1990	Atlètic Terrassa	(Catalonia)
1991	Atlètic Terrassa	(Catalonia)
1992	Atlètic Terrassa	(Catalonia)
1993	Club Egara	(Catalonia)
1994	Atlètic Terrassa	(Catalonia)
1995	Atlètic Terrassa	(Catalonia)
1996	RC Polo	(Catalonia)

Year	Champion	Region
1997	Atlètic Terrassa	(Catalonia)
1998	Club Egara	(Catalonia)
1999	Club Egara	(Catalonia)
2000	Club Egara	(Catalonia)
2001	Atlètic Terrassa	(Catalonia)
2002	Atlètic Terrassa	(Catalonia)
2003	RC Polo	(Catalonia)
2004	Club de Campo	(Community of Madrid)
2005	Club de Campo	(Community of Madrid)
2006	Atlètic Terrassa	(Catalonia)
2007	Club Egara	(Catalonia)
2008	RC Polo	(Catalonia)
2009	Club Egara	(Catalonia)
2010	Atlètic Terrassa	(Catalonia)
2011	Club de Campo	(Community of Madrid)
2012	Club de Campo	(Community of Madrid)
2013	RC Polo	(Catalonia)
2014	RC Polo	(Catalonia)
2015	Atlètic Terrassa	(Catalonia)
2016	RC Polo	(Catalonia)
2017	RC Polo	(Catalonia)
2018	Club Egara	(Catalonia)
2019	RC Polo	(Catalonia)
2020	RC Polo	(Catalonia)
2021	Club Egara	(Catalonia)
2022	Atlètic Terrassa	(Catalonia)
2023	Club de Campo	(Community of Madrid)
2024	RC Polo	(Catalonia)
2025	Club de Campo	(Community of Madrid)
2026	RC Polo	(Catalonia)

=== Titles by team ===
Team	Titles	Years won
RC Polo	33	1916, 1917, 1922, 1924, 1925, 1929, 1941, 1957, 1958, 1959, 1960, 1962, 1964, 1970, 1974, 1976, 1979, 1980, 1981, 1982, 1983, 1989, 1996, 2003, 2008, 2013, 2014, 2016, 2017, 2019, 2020, 2024, 2026
Club Egara	18	1921, 1952, 1961, 1963, 1965, 1968, 1969, 1971, 1972, 1973, 1993, 1998, 1999, 2000, 2007, 2009, 2018, 2021
Atlètic Terrassa	18	1933, 1984, 1985, 1986, 1987, 1988, 1990, 1991, 1992, 1994, 1995, 1997, 2001, 2002, 2006, 2010, 2015, 2022
Club de Campo	15	1934, 1935, 1936, 1940, 1953, 1954, 1956, 1977, 1978, 2004, 2005, 2011, 2012, 2023, 2025
CD Terrassa	11	1943, 1945, 1946, 1948, 1949, 1950, 1951, 1955, 1966, 1967, 1975
Atlético Madrid	7	1915, 1919, 1920, 1923, 1926, 1927, 1928
FC Barcelona	3	1942, 1944, 1947
Real Sociedad	2	1918, 1930
Tranviaria	1	1932
Valencia	1	1931

== See also ==
- Copa de la Reina de Hockey Hierba
- División de Honor de Hockey Hierba
