= División de Honor de Hockey Hierba =

División de Honor
- Most recent season or competition: 2025–26 División de Honor de Hockey Hierba
- Sport: Field hockey
- Founded: 1957; 69 years ago
- First season: 1957–58
- Administrator: Real Federación Española de Hockey
- No. of teams: 12
- Country: Spain
- Confederation: EHF (Europe)
- Most recent champion: Real Club de Campo (4th title) (2025–26)
- Most titles: Atlètic Terrassa (22 titles)
- Level on pyramid: 1
- Relegation to: División de Honor Masculina B
- Domestic cup: Copa del Rey
- International cup: Euro Hockey League
- Website: rfeh.es

The División de Honor de Hockey Hierba is the top level of field hockey in Spain. It was founded in 1957 and is managed by the Real Federación Española de Hockey.

== Teams ==
Team	Location	Autonomous Community	Stadium
Atlètic Terrassa	Terrassa	Catalonia	Estadi de Hockey Josep Marquès
Atlético San Sebastián	San Sebastián	Basque Country	Instalación De Aiete
Barcelona	Barcelona	Catalonia	Pau Negre Stadium
CD Terrassa	Matadepera	Catalonia	Les Pedritxes
Club de Campo	Madrid	Madrid	Club de Campo
Club Egara	Terrassa	Catalonia	Pla de Bon Aire
Complutense	Madrid	Madrid	San Sebastián de los Reyes
Jolaseta	Getxo	Basque Country	R.C. Jolaseta
Junior	Sant Cugat del Vallès	Catalonia	Sant Cugat
Real Club de Polo	Barcelona	Catalonia	Eduardo Dualde
Taburiente	Las Palmas	Canary Islands	Campo de Hockey de 7 Palmas
Tenis	Santander	Cantabria	La Albericia

=== Number of teams by autonomous community ===
Autonomous Community	Number of teams	Teams
Catalonia	6	Atlètic Terrassa, Barcelona, CD Terrassa, Club Egara, Junior and Real Club de Polo
Basque Country	2	Atlético San Sebastián and Jolaseta
Madrid	2	Club de Campo and Complutense
Cantabria	1	Tenis
Canary Islands	1	Taburiente
Total	12	

== Champions ==
Season	Winner	Runner-up
1957–58	Real Club de Polo (1)	Club de Campo (1)
1958–59	Real Club de Polo (2)	Gaviria San Sebastían (1)
1959–60	Gaviria San Sebastián (1)	Real Club de Polo (1)
1961–69	Not held	
1969–70	Real Club de Polo (3)	Jolaseta (1)
1970–71	Club Egara (1)	Real Club de Polo (2)
1971–72	Club Egara (2)	Real Club de Polo (3)
1972–73	Club Egara (3)	Real Club de Polo (4)
1973–74	Club Egara (4)	Real Club de Polo (5)
1974–75	Club Egara (5)	Real Club de Polo (6)
1975–76	CD Terrassa (1)	Real Club de Polo (7)
1976–77	Real Club de Polo (4)	Club Egara (1)
1977–78	Real Club de Polo (5)	Club Egara (2)
1978–79	Club Egara (6)	Real Club de Polo (8)
1979–80	Real Club de Polo (6)	Club Egara (3)
1980–81	Real Club de Polo (7)	Club de Campo (2)
1981–82	Real Club de Polo (8)	Club de Campo (3)
1982–83	Atlètic Terrassa (1)	Real Club de Polo (9)
1983–84	Atlètic Terrassa (2)	Real Club de Polo (10)
1984–85	Atlètic Terrassa (3)	Real Club de Polo (11)
1985–86	Atlètic Terrassa (4)	Club de Campo (4)
1986–87	Atlètic Terrassa (5)	San Pablo Valdeluz (1)
1987–88	Atlètic Terrassa (6)	Real Club de Polo (12)
1988–89	Atlètic Terrassa (7)	Real Club de Polo (13)
1989–90	Atlètic Terrassa (8)	Real Club de Polo (14)
1990–91	Atlètic Terrassa (9)	Club Egara (4)
1991–92	Club Egara (7)	Atlètic Terrassa (1)
1992–93	Club Egara (8)	Atlètic Terrassa (2)
1993–94	Atlètic Terrassa (10)	Club Egara (5)
1994–95	Atlètic Terrassa (11)	Club Egara (6)
1995–96	Club Egara (9)	Atlètic Terrassa (3)

Season	Winner	Runner-up
1996–97	Atlètic Terrassa (12)	Club Egara (7)
1997–98	Club Egara (10)	Atlètic Terrassa (4)
1998–99	Club Egara (11)	Atlètic Terrassa (5)
1999–2000	Club Egara (12)	Atlètic Terrassa (6)
2000–01	Club Egara (13)	Atlètic Terrassa (7)
2001–02	Real Club de Polo (9)	Atlètic Terrassa (8)
2002–03	Real Club de Polo (10)	Club Egara (8)
2003–04	Atlètic Terrassa (13)	Club Egara (9)
2004–05	Atlètic Terrassa (14)	Real Club de Polo (15)
2005–06	Atlètic Terrassa (15)	Club Egara (10)
2006–07	Atlètic Terrassa (16)	Real Club de Polo (16)
2007–08	Real Club de Polo (11)	Atlètic Terrassa (9)
2008–09	Atlètic Terrassa (17)	Real Club de Polo (17)
2009–10	Atlètic Terrassa (18)	Club de Campo (5)
2010–11	Atlètic Terrassa (19)	Club de Campo (6)
2011–12	Atlètic Terrassa (20)	Real Club de Polo (18)
2012–13	Real Club de Polo (12)	Club de Campo (7)
2013–14	Real Club de Polo (13)	Club Egara (11)
2014–15	Real Club de Polo (14)	Club Egara (12)
2015–16	Club Egara (14)	Real Club de Polo (19)
2016–17	Atlètic Terrassa (21)	Club Egara (13)
2017–18	Real Club de Polo (15)	Junior (1)
2018–19	Club Egara (15)	Real Club de Polo (20)
2019–20	Curtailed due to the COVID-19 pandemic in Spain	
2020–21	Club de Campo (1)	Atlètic Terrassa (10)
2021–22	Atlètic Terrassa (22)	Real Club de Polo (21)
2022–23	Club de Campo (2)	Real Club de Polo (22)
2023–24	Club de Campo (3)	Real Club de Polo (23)
2024–25	Real Club de Polo (16)	Atlètic Terrassa (11)
2025–26	Real Club de Campo (4)	Real Club de Polo (24)

== Titles won ==
=== By club ===
Club	Championships	Runners-up	Seasons won
Atlètic Terrassa	22	11	1982–83, 1983–84, 1984–85, 1985–86, 1986–87, 1987–88, 1988–89, 1989–90, 1990–91, 1993–94, 1994–95, 1996–97, 2003–04, 2004–05, 2005–06, 2006–07, 2008–09, 2009–10, 2010–11, 2011–12, 2016–17, 2021–22
Real Club de Polo	16	23	1957–58, 1958–59, 1969–70, 1976–77, 1977–78, 1979–80, 1980–81, 1981–82, 2001–02, 2002–03, 2007–08, 2012–13, 2013–14, 2014–15, 2017–18, 2024–25
Club Egara	15	13	1970–71, 1971–72, 1972–73, 1973–74, 1974–75, 1978–79, 1991–92, 1992–93, 1995–96, 1997–98, 1998–99, 1999–2000, 2000–01, 2015–16, 2018–19
Real Club de Campo	4	7	2020–21, 2022–23, 2023–24, 2025–26
Gaviria San Sebastián	1	1	1959–60
CD Terrassa	1	0	1975–76
San Pablo Valdeluz	0	1	
Jolaseta	0	1	
Junior	0	1	

=== By autonomous community ===
Autonomous Community	Championships	Runners-up	Winning clubs
Catalonia	54	47	Atlètic Terrassa (22), Real Club de Polo (15), Club Egara (15), CD Terrassa (1)
Madrid	4	8	Real Club de Campo (4)
Basque Country	1	2	Gaviria San Sebastián (1)

== See also ==
- Copa del Rey de Hockey Hierba
- División de Honor Femenina de Hockey Hierba
