= Xavi Lleonart =

Spanish field hockey player (born 1990)

Personal information
- Full name: Xavier Lleonart Blanco
- Born: 22 June 1990 (age 36) Terrassa, Spain
- Height: 1.80 m (5 ft 11 in)
- Weight: 70 kg (154 lb)

Sport
- Sport: Field hockey
- Position: Forward
Youth career
- Team
- –: CD Terrassa
Senior career
Years	Team	Caps	Goals
–2012	CD Terrassa	-	-
2012–2017	Real Club de Polo	-	-
2017–2018	Bloemendaal	-	-
2018–2025	Real Club de Polo	-	-
National team
Years	Team	Caps	Goals
2009–2021	Spain	221	(93)
Medal record
Men's field hockey
Representing Spain
EuroHockey Championship
Silver medal – second place	2019 Antwerp

Xavier Lleonart Blanco (born 22 June 1990) is a Spanish former field hockey player who played as a forward. He played a total 221 matches for the Spanish national team from 2009 to 2021.

== Club career ==
Lleonart came through the youth ranks of CD Terrassa where he played in the first team until the 2011–12 season. He joined Real Club de Polo after the 2012 Summer Olympics. In 2017 he joined Dutch club Bloemendaal. He won the 2017–18 Euro Hockey League with Bloemendaal before returning to Real Club de Polo after one season. In May 2025, he announced he would retire after the 2024–25 season championship finals. He scored a penalty stroke in the final where they won 2–1 against Atlètic Terrassa to win Real Club de Polo's 16th Spanish league title.

== International career ==
At the 2012 and 2016 Summer Olympics, Lleonart competed for the national team in the men's tournament. He represented Spain at the 2018 World Cup. At the 2019 EuroHockey Championship, he won his first medal with the national team as they finished second. On 25 May 2021, he was selected in the squad for the 2021 EuroHockey Championship.
