= Matadepera =

- Municipality
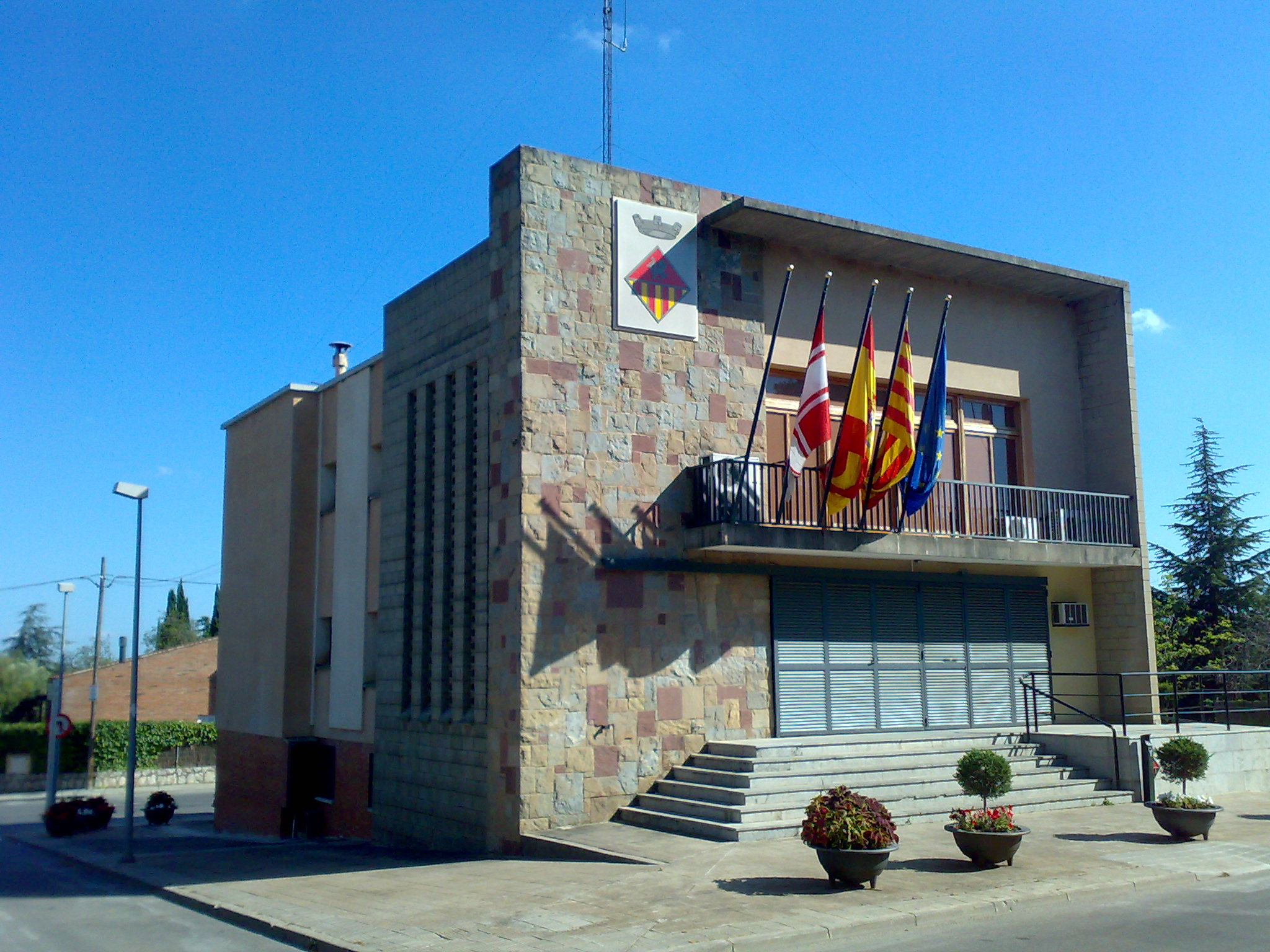
- Matadepera town hall

- Flag Coat of arms

- Location in Catalonia Matadepera (Catalonia) Matadepera (Spain)
- Coordinates: 41°36′13″N 2°01′28″E
- Country: Spain
- Community: Catalonia
- Province: Barcelona
- Comarca: Vallès Occidental

Government
  - Mayor: Nil López Crespo (2019)

Area
  - Total: 25.4 km^{2} (9.8 sq mi)
- Elevation: 423 m (1,388 ft)

Population (2025-01-01)
  - Total: 9,776
  - Density: 385/km^{2} (997/sq mi)
- Demonym: Matadeperenc
- Postal code: 08230
- Website: matadepera.cat

Matadepera (Catalan pronunciation: [ˌmatəðəˈpeɾə]) is a municipality in the comarca of the Vallès Occidental in Catalonia, Spain.

== Twin towns ==
- Mariapfarr, Austria, since 1984
- (United States) Lincoln, Massachusetts, US, since 1989
