= Atlètic Terrassa Hockey Club =

Atlètic Terrassa
- Full name: Atlètic Terrassa Hockey Club
- League: Men's División de Honor; Women's Primera División
- Founded: 1952
- Home ground: Can Salas, Terrassa, Spain
- Website: www.athc.cat
Home

Atlètic Terrassa Hockey Club, also known as Atlètic Terrassa, is a professional field hockey club based in Terrassa, Catalonia, Spain. The club was founded in 1952. Their senior men's field hockey team play in the División de Honor and the Copa del Rey. They have also regularly represented Spain in the Euro Hockey League. Their senior women's field hockey team play in the División de Honor and in the Copa de la Reina. In addition to field hockey, the club also organises teams in various other sports and activities including tennis, padel, basketball, futsal, swimming, gymnastics and golf.

== History ==
Atlètic Terrassa was founded in 1952. They won their first División de Honor title in 1982–83 and subsequently went onto win nine consecutive titles between then and 1990–91. Between 2003–04 and 2011–12 they won the División de Honor eight seasons out of nine. Atlètic won their first Copa del Rey in 1983–84 and subsequently went onto win five consecutive tournaments between then and 1987–88. In 2014–15 they won their 16th Copa del Rey after defeating Real Club de Polo in a penalty shoot-out.

== Euro Hockey League ==
Atlètic Terrassa have regularly represented Spain in the Euro Hockey League. Their best performance in the competition was in 2021 when they finished second.

Season	Round
2007–08	Quarter-finals
2008–09	Round one
2009–10	Quarter-finals
2010–11	Quarter-finals
2011–12	Round of 16
2012–13	Round of 16
2014–15	Round one
2015–16	Semi-finals
2016–17	Quarter-finals
2017–18	Round of 16
2021	Silver medal

== Can Salas ==
Atlètic Terrassa are based at Can Salas, located near Sant Llorenç del Munt and bordering Terrassa, Sabadell, Matadepera and Castellar del Vallès. The club purchased the former vineyards in 1967 and gradually expanded until acquiring 60 hectares. Construction began in January 1968 and the grounds were officially opened in 1969. In addition to hosting Copa del Rey and the Copa de la Reina tournaments, Can Salas and Atlètic Terrassa have also hosted international tournaments at their hockey stadium called the Estadi de Hockey Josep Marquès, including the 2006 Men's Hockey Champions Trophy and the 2010–11 Euro Hockey League Round 1 group stages.

== Players ==
=== Current squad ===
==== Men's squad ====
Head coach: Xavier Gasol

As of 2021–22

Pos.	Nation	Player
	ESP	Marc Vizcaino
MF	ESP	Jordi Bonastre
	ESP	Quim Malgosa
	ESP	Santi Ibañez
	ESP	Marc Escudé
	ESP	Joan Monzo
GK	ESP	Marc Calzada
	ESP	Xavier Barutel

Pos.	Nation	Player
DF	NED	Johannes Mooij
	ESP	Roger Malgosa
	ESP	Pol Cabré-Verdiell
DF	ESP	Pau Cunill
MF	ESP	Pepe Cunill
DF	ESP	Ignasi Torras
MF	ESP	Marc Sallés

=== Women's squad ===
Head coach: Jordi Flo

As of September 2020

Pos.	Nation	Player
	ESP	Nina Cortes
	ESP	Maria Barba
FW	ARG	Antonella Rinaldi
	ESP	Anna Barba
	SCO	Lexi Sabatelli
DF	ARG	Julia Gomes Fantasia
	SCO	Jessica Buchanan
	ESP	Gemma Beltran

No.	Pos.	Nation	Player
	ESP	Marta Dorda	
	ESP	Clara Barba	
	ESP	Hanna Badia	
	ESP	Meritxell Vizcaino	
	ESP	Nuria Carles	
	ESP	Julia Calvo	
	ESP	Maria Gesti	
	ESP	Cristina Escude	
	ESP	Maria Torrente	

=== Men's internationals ===
Spain

- Jaime Arbós
- Juan Arbós
- Javier Arnau
- Jordi Arnau
- Jordi Carrera
- Miguel Chaves
- Miquel Delas
- Sergi Enrique
- Xavier Escudé
- Santi Freixa
- Joaquim Malgosa
- Santiago Malgosa
- Roc Oliva
- Miguel de Paz
- Xavier Ribas
- Albert Sala
- Marc Salles

Germany

- Matthias Witthaus

Netherlands

- Johannes Mooij

=== Women's internationals ===
Spain

- Silvia Bonastre
- Celia Corres
- Nuria Olivé
- Georgina Oliva
- Esther Termens

Argentina

- Sofía Maccari
- Ayelén Stepnik

== Honours ==
=== Men ===
División de Honor

- Winners (22): 1982–83, 1983–84, 1984–85, 1985–86, 1986–87, 1987–88, 1988–89, 1989–90, 1990–91, 1993–94, 1994–95, 1996–97, 2003–04, 2004–05, 2005–06, 2006–07, 2008–09, 2009–10, 2010–11, 2011–12, 2016–17, 2021–22
- Runners-up (10): 1991–92, 1992–93, 1995–96, 1997–98, 1998–99, 1999–00, 2000–01, 2001–02, 2007–08, 2020–21

Copa del Rey

- Winners (17): 1983–84, 1984–85, 1985–86, 1986–87, 1987–88, 1989–90, 1990–91, 1991–92, 1993–94, 1994–95, 1996–97, 2000–01, 2001–02, 2005–06, 2009–10, 2014–15, 2021–22 (Note: Different sources list either Atlètic Terrassa or Club Deportiu Terrassa as winners of the 1933 Copa del Rey de Hockey Hierba. Atlètic Terrassa does not include this title in their list of honours.)

Euro Hockey League

- Runners-up (1): 2021

EuroHockey Club Champions Cup

- Winners (2): 1985, 1998
- Runner-up (7): 1987, 1989, 1990, 1991, 1992, 2006, 2007

EuroHockey Cup Winners Cup

- Winners (2): 1994, 2000

Catalonia Hockey Championship

- Winners (17): 1979–80, 1982–83, 1984–85, 1985–86, 1986–87, 1987–88, 1988–89, 1989–90, 1990–91, 1992–93, 1994–95, 1995–96, 1996–97, 2002–03, 2003–04, 2004–05, 2020–21 (Note: This list of Catalonia Hockey Championship titles is taken from Spanish and Catalan Wikipedia articles. Their list differs considerably from the list on Atlètic Terrassa's own website.)

EuroHockey Indoor Club Cup

- Winners (1): 1999
- Runners-up (2): 2002, 2010

=== Women ===
Catalonia Hockey Championship: 3

- 1988, 2007, 2009
