= Club Egara =

Spanish sports club

- Full name: Club Egara
- League: Men's División de Honor; Women's División de Honor
- Founded: 1935; 91 years ago
- Home ground: Pla del Bon Aire, Terrassa (Capacity 2,000)

Personnel
- Chairman: Pere Marcet
- Members: 837
- Website: Club website
Home	Away

Club Egara is a Spanish sports club based in Terrassa, Catalonia. It was founded in 1935 with the name 'CD Armonia Egara'. It is best known for its professional field hockey department but it also has tennis, padel and golf sections.

It plays in the Pla del Bon Aire facilities. It is one of the best teams in Spain, having won 15 Spanish league titles.

== Sports ==
- Field hockey
- Tennis
- Padel
- Golf
- Equestrianism
- Gymnastics
- Swimming

== Honours ==
=== Men ===
División de Honor

- Winners (15): 1970–71, 1971–72, 1972–73, 1973–74, 1974–75, 1978–79, 1991–92, 1992–93, 1995–96, 1997–98, 1998–99, 1999–2000, 2000–01, 2015–16, 2018–19

Copa del Rey

- Winners (18): 1921, 1952, 1961, 1963, 1965, 1968, 1969, 1971, 1972, 1973, 1993, 1998, 1999, 2000, 2007, 2009, 2018, 2021

EuroHockey Club Champions Cup

- Runners-up (2): 1993, 1999

== Current squad ==
=== Men's squad ===
As of 2021–22

Pos.	Nation	Player
	ESP	Xavier Aguilar
	ESP	Lluis Mercade
	ESP	Ignasi Use
	ESP	Gerard Clapes
MF	ESP	Xavi Gispert
	ESP	Pol Gispert
	ESP	Jaume Torras
	ESP	Alex Gil

Pos.	Nation	Player
	ESP	Josep Novell
	ESP	Miquel Espi
GK	ESP	Albert Perez
	ESP	Pedro Sanroma
DF	ESP	Marc Recasens
	ESP	Alex Broto
	ESP	Nacho Prat

=== Women's squad ===
As of 2021–22

Pos.	Nation	Player
	GER	Sophia Willig
	ESP	Marta Llobet
	ESP	Marta Grau
	ESP	Laura Lilian
	ESP	Anna Gispert
	ESP	Mireia Herrero
FW	ESP	Carola Salvatella

Pos.	Nation	Player
FW	ESP	Berta Bonastre
FW	ESP	María Tost
	ESP	Quaralt Colet
	ESP	Claudia Adell
	ESP	Carla Gomez
	ESP	Mariona Girabent
