= Real Sociedad de Tenis de la Magdalena =

Private country club in Santander, Spain

Coordinates: 43°28′06″N 3°46′27″W

Real Sociedad de Tenis de La Magdalena RSTM
- Nicknames: El Tenis
- Sport: Tennis Grass hockey Roller hockey Swimming Bowling Canoeing
- Founded: 7 April 1906
- Based in: Santander, Spain
Colors
- President: Ángela Escallada y de Haya
- Honorary President: Felipe VI
- Website: rstenis.com

The Real Sociedad de Tenis de la Magdalena (Spanish pronunciation: [reˈal soθjeˈðað ðe ˈtenis ðe la maɣðaˈlena]; "Royal Society of Tennis of la Magdalena"), commonly known as El Tenis de Santander and familiarly as El Tenis, is a private country club in Santander, Spain. Founded by king Alfonso XIII and a group of noblemen on 7 April 1906, it is one of the oldest country clubs in Spain.

The club is located in the Magdalena Peninsula, and has over 8,000 members, having sports sections of tennis, hockey, roller hockey, swimming, bowling, and canoeing.

Currently membership is largely reserved for the children and spouses of members only, being very restrictive towards people wishing to become affiliates.

== History ==
=== First half of the 20th century ===
Early in the century a group of noblemen decided to create a sports club which they christened as Lawn-tenis Society of Santander. It was installed on the premises of a velodrome, built a few years earlier near the Magdalena Peninsula. In the square surrounded by the racetrack they placed two cement tennis pitches, complemented by a booth, where the players could change attire.

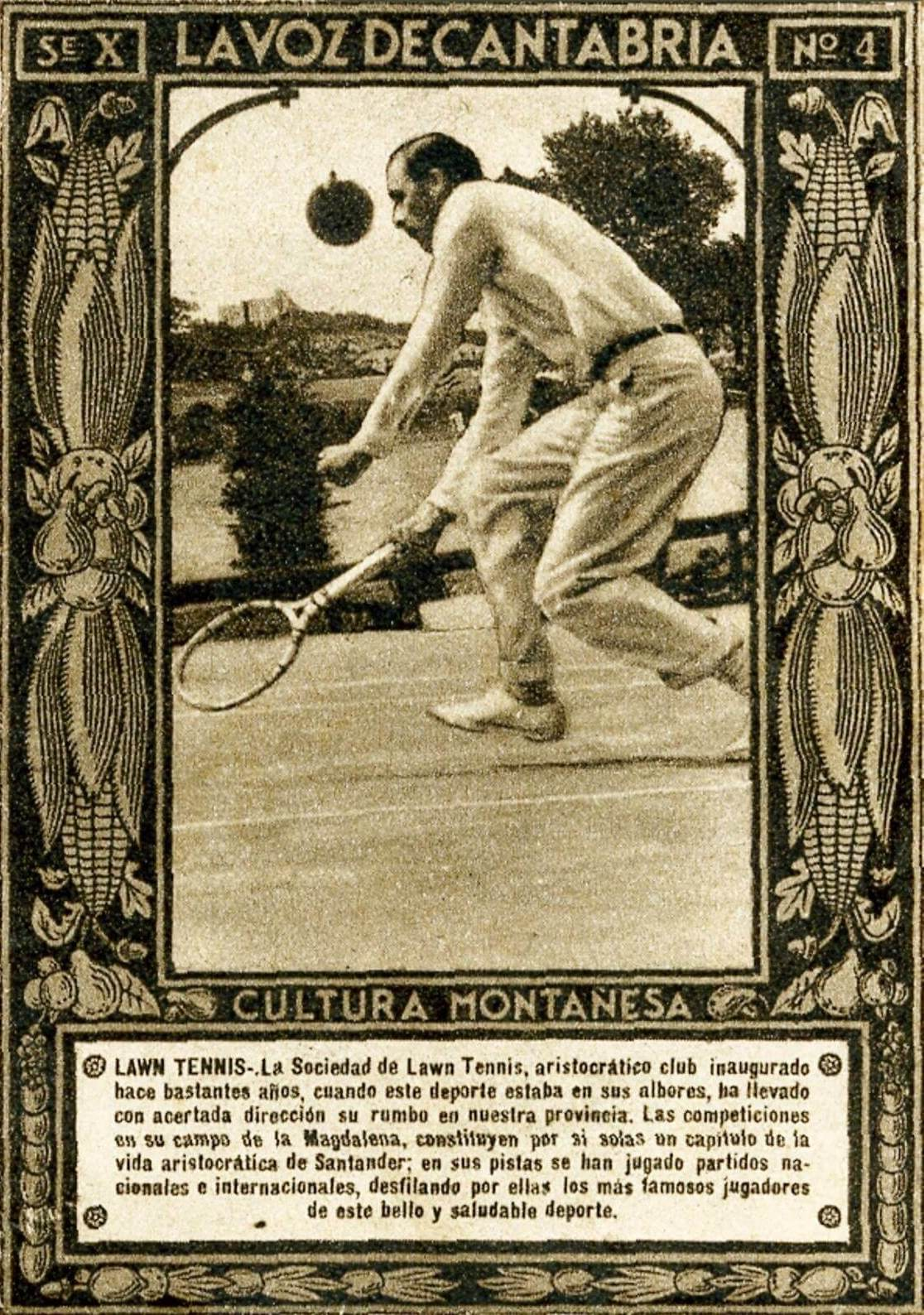
The Duke of Alba playing a tennis match at the club, in 1927

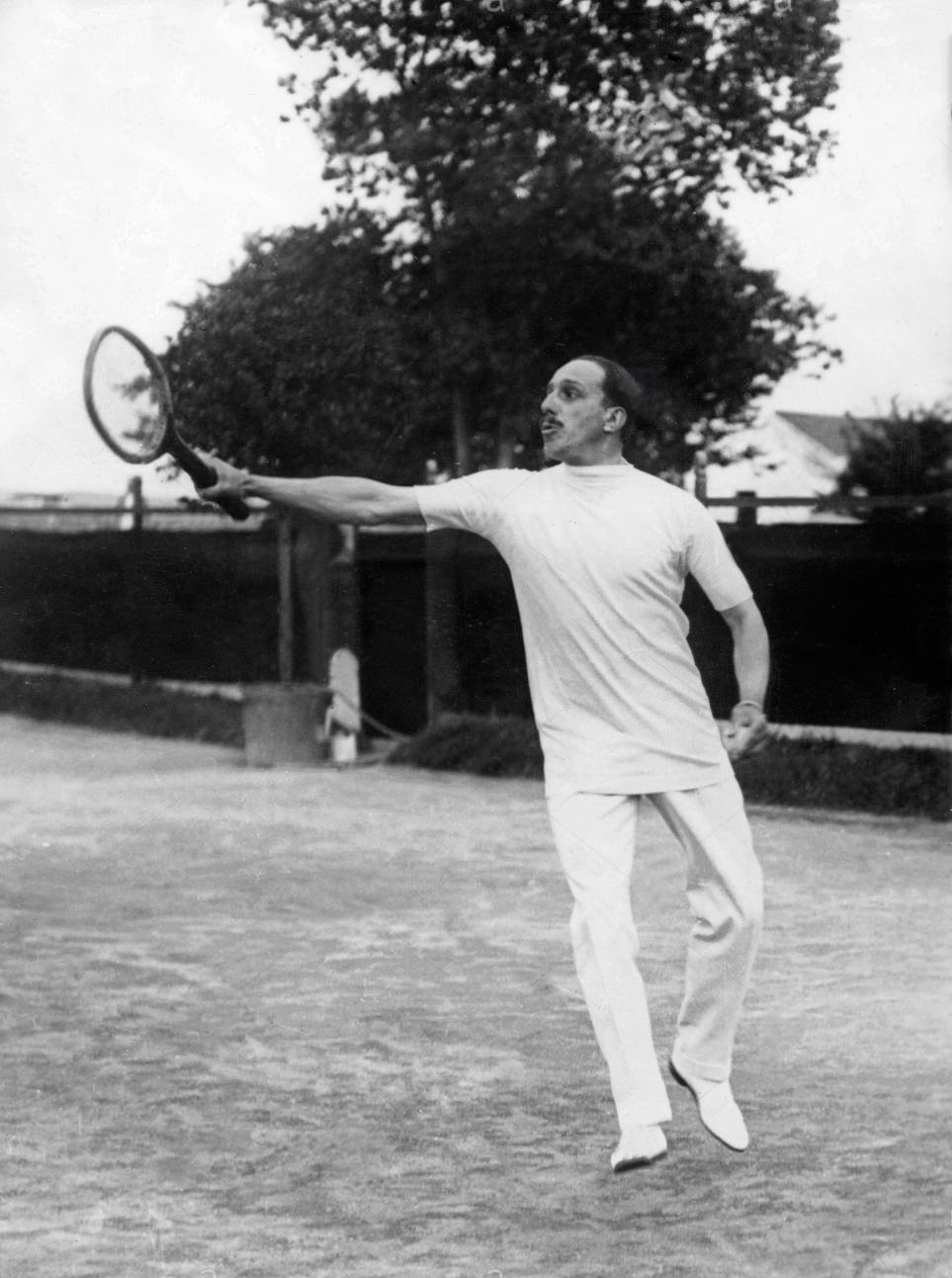
Alfonso XIII during a tennis match at the club, 1925

Two years later, the Santander Consistory decided to give king Alfonso XIII the strategic peninsula, while starting up the popular initiative to build a summer palace for the Spanish Royal Family. From that moment the elitist club became a popular sport entity much frequented by the Spanish royal family. Consequently, in 1909 King Alfonso assumed the Presidency of Honor of the club, which allowed it to add the prefix "Real".

After this appointment, there was a sharp increase in the number of affiliated members with the consequent expansion of sporting activities and meetings of social and festive character. The construction of new gravel roads and buildings allowed the club to share grounds with the Palacio de la Magdalena. Other activities such as bowling were also incorporated, whose first championship was held in 1933.

In 1945, a hockey team was established.

=== Second half of the 20th century ===
With the celebration of the 50th anniversary of the club, the Prince Juan Carlos I arranged a visit. Years later, the king Juan Carlos I officially accepted the honorary presidency of the club in 1976. After this, many events were held, including the European Tennis Championship held in 1982, the organization of the first edition of the International tennis tournament, now called ATP and the Fed Cup semi-final, played between Spain and Germany in 1995.

=== 21st century ===
During the 21st century, the club has organized events including the 2000 Davis Cup semi-final, between Spain and the US in which the host country won.

In 2006, the club celebrated its centenary with events including the Spanish National Tennis Championship in both male and female categories, as well as the Spanish National Bowling Tournament and the Spanish National Hockey Championship.

== Facilities ==
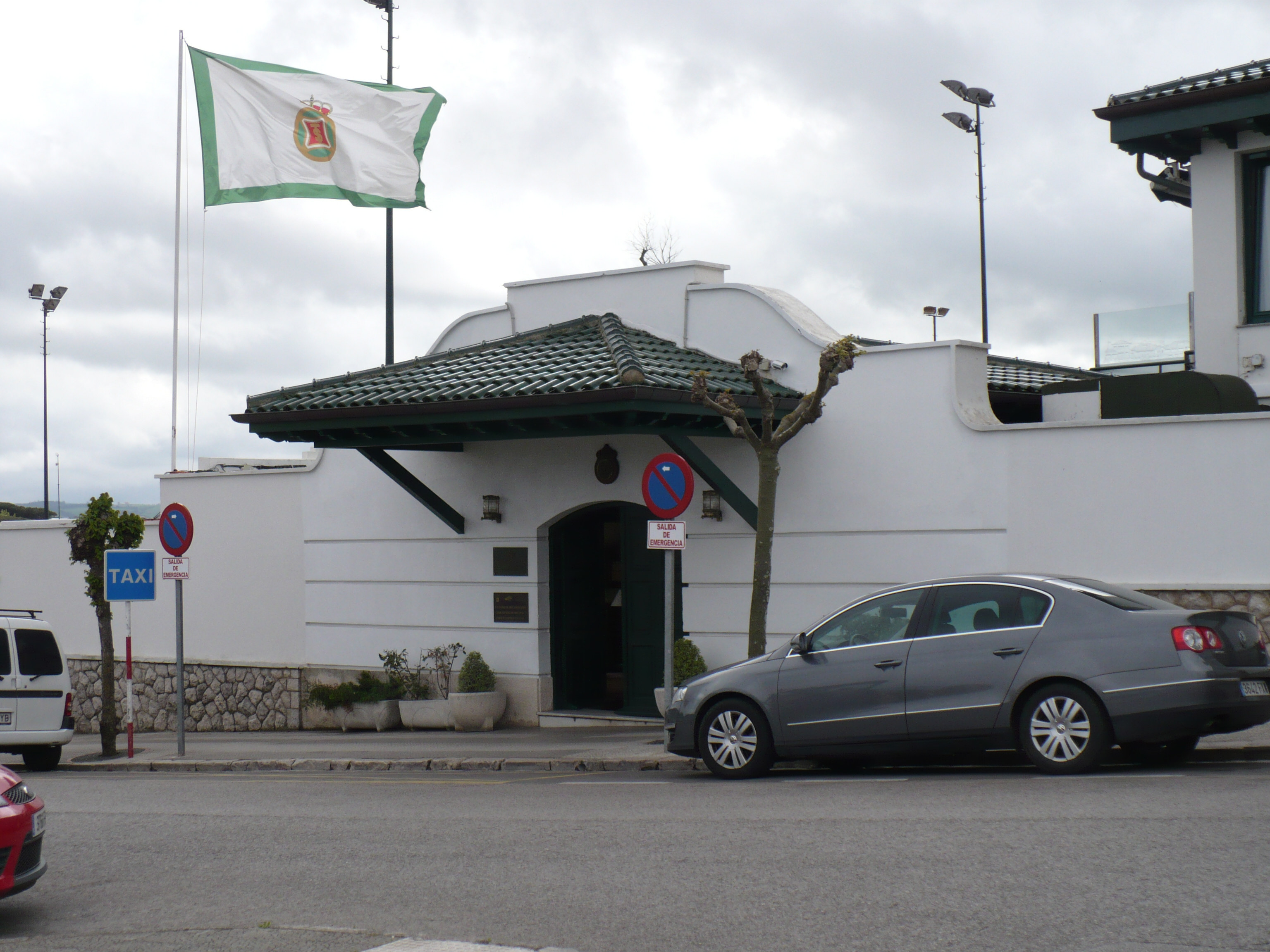
The club's main entrance

The club's facilities are composed of five tennis courts of clay and two synthetic surface courts, a bowling court, a fitness center, 3 swimming pools, a nautical section and senior and youth social buildings.

== Hockey ==
=== Current squad ===
==== Men's squad ====
Head coach: Borja Movellan

As of 2021–22

Pos.	Nation	Player
	ESP	Carlos Blanc
	ESP	Eduardo Gonzalez-Mesones
DF	ARG	Agustín Machelett
MF	ITA	Facundo Harte
	ESP	Luciano Lanfranconi
	ESP	Alejandro Davila
	ESP	Antonio Lopez-Alonso
	ESP	Alvaro Lopez-Alonso

Pos.	Nation	Player
	ESP	Gonzalo Quijano
DF	ESP	Alejandro Alonso
	ESP	Ignacio Alvarez
GK	ESP	Alvaro Floranes
	ESP	Alfonso Alvarez
	ITA	Franco Harte
	ESP	Nicolás Alvarez
	ESP	Felipe Campuzanos

== Club Presidents ==
- 1906 – 1910 The Count of Mansilla
- 1910 – 1942 Gabriel María de Pombo e Ibarra
- 1942 – 1945 Ángel Jado y Canales
- 1945 – 1948 Miguel Quijano de la Colina
- 1948 – 1957 Ernesto Alday y Redonet
- 1957 – 1960 Rupert Arrarte e Isasi
- 1960 Francisco de Nardiz y Pombo
- 1960 – 1966 Pedro Quijano y González-Camino
- 1966 – 1972 Antonio Zúñiga y García de Chama
- 1974 – 1978 Luis Ortueta y Egido
- 1978 – 1986 José Felipe Arrarte y de la Revilla
- 1986 – 1990 José Ignacio de la Torriente y Oria
- 1990 – 1994 Mariano Moro y Ribalaygua
- 1994 – 2000 Jesús Pellón y Fernández-Fontecha
- 2000 Alfonso Yllera y Palazuelo
- 2000 – 2007 Fernando Bolívar y Fernández
- 2007 – 2011 Carlos Rey y Hoppe
- 2011 – 2015 Enrique Zalduondo y Fernández-Baladrón
- 2015 – 2019 Fernando Cortines y González de Riancho
- 2019 – Ángela Escallada y de Haya

== Honours ==
=== National honours ===
- Royal Order of Sports Merit

== See also ==
- Real Club de la Puerta de Hierro
