= Real Club de Polo de Barcelona =

Country club in Barcelona, Spain

Coordinates: 41°22′54″N 2°06′40″E

Real Club de Polo
- Full name: Real Club de Polo de Barcelona
- Short name: RCPB
- League: Men's División de Honor; Women's División de Honor
- Founded: 1897; 128 years ago
- Home ground: Camp Eduardo Dualde, Barcelona (Capacity 1,500)
- Website: Club website
Home	Away

Real Club de Polo de Barcelona (English: Barcelona Royal Polo Club) is a country club in Barcelona, Spain. Established in 1897, it had 9000 members at the time of the 1992 Summer Olympics. Normally used for polo, field hockey, tennis, squash, and swimming by its members. the club was the venue for the Olympic equestrian competition (dressage, jumping, and the eventing finals) and the riding portion of the modern pentathlon events.

== History ==
The Real Club de Polo de Barcelona was founded in 1897 by a man named Enrique de Iberdrola. De Iberdrola had visited London, United Kingdom and discovered Polo. He returned to Spain and with a few friends, founded the Polo Jockey Club. In 1899, they played the first inter-club polo match in Spain against the Madrid Polo Club. After this, the club started to branch out to run other sports such as show jumping, tennis, field hockey and paddle tennis. In 1912, they received a royal title following their merge with the Barcelona Jockey Club to become the "Real Polo Jockey Club de Barcelona". In 1939, they renamed again as the Real Club de Polo de Barcelona.

The Real Club de Polo de Barcelona was selected by the Barcelona Olympic Games Organising Committee to host the equestrian events, except the eventing and endurance phase of the dressage, at the Barcelona-hosted 1992 Summer Olympics. By this time, the club had 9,000 members. 25 years later the club hosted a tribute to the Spanish Olympic team. In 1997, to celebrate the clubs centenary, it was awarded a Royal Order of Sports Merit. In 2022, to celebrate their 125th anniversary, the Real Club de Polo de Barcelona would be hosting an international Grand Masters Hockey tournament. In 2024, they supplied eight athletes for the Spanish Olympic team at the 2024 Summer Olympics in Paris, France with one equestrian athlete and seven across the men's and women's hockey teams.

== Grounds ==
The club first played at the Can Tunis Racecourse but moved to their own dedicated polo grounds in Casa-Rabia in 1909, before moving in 1929 to Torre Melina.

== Current squad ==
=== Men's squad ===
Head coach: Katie Allen

As of 2021–22

Pos.	Nation	Player
	ESP	Salvador Armenteras
DF	ESP	Pablo de Abadal
	ESP	Alfredo Baron
GK	ESP	Luis Calzado
	ESP	Iñaki Zaldua
DF	ARG	Santiago Tarazona
GK	ESP	Alberto Carnicer
	ESP	Alex Reyne
	ESP	Ton Borras

Pos.	Nation	Player
	ESP	Marc Reyne
	ESP	Javier Cabot
FW	ESP	Xavi Lleonart
	ESP	Guillermo Fortuño
MF	ESP	Marc Miralles
	ESP	Javier Uriach
MF	ESP	Viçens Ruiz
DF	ESP	Llorenç Piera
