= Field hockey at the 2020 Summer Olympics – Women's team squads =

This article shows the squads of all participating teams at the women's field hockey tournament at the 2020 Summer Olympics in Tokyo.

In July 2021, the IOC allowed teams to nominate up to 18 players instead of the usual 16, due to the COVID-19 pandemic.

Age, caps and club as of 24 July 2021.

== Group A ==
=== Germany ===
The squad was announced on 27 May 2021.

Head coach: (Belgium) Xavier Reckinger

No.	Pos.	Player	Date of birth (age)	Caps	Goals	Club
2	DF	Kira Horn	12 February 1995 (aged 26)	36	2	(Germany) Club an der Alster
3	MF	Amelie Wortmann	21 October 1996 (aged 24)	63	4	(Germany) UHC Hamburg
4	MF	Nike Lorenz (Captain)	12 March 1997 (aged 24)	120	33	(Germany) Rot-Weiss Köln
5	DF	Selin Oruz	5 February 1997 (aged 24)	104	2	(Germany) Düsseldorfer HC
8	FW	Anne Schröder	11 September 1994 (aged 26)	146	14	(Germany) Club an der Alster
11	MF	Lena Micheel	29 April 1998 (aged 23)	58	14	(Germany) UHC Hamburg
12	FW	Charlotte Stapenhorst	15 June 1995 (aged 26)	111	33	(Germany) UHC Hamburg
16	DF	Sonja Zimmermann	15 June 1999 (aged 22)	38	8	(Germany) Mannheimer HC
17	MF	Pauline Heinz	1 May 2001 (aged 20)	13	2	(Germany) Rüsselsheimer RK
18	FW	Lisa Altenburg	23 September 1989 (aged 31)	132	33	(Germany) Club an der Alster
19	DF	Maike Schaunig	13 March 1996 (aged 25)	49	0	(Germany) Uhlenhorst Mülheim
20	GK	Julia Ciupka	1 November 1991 (aged 29)	61	0	(Germany) Rot-Weiss Köln
21	MF	Franzisca Hauke	10 September 1989 (aged 31)	189	16	(Germany) Harvestehuder THC
22	FW	Cécile Pieper	31 August 1994 (aged 26)	123	14	(Germany) Rot-Weiss Köln
24	FW	Pia Maertens	6 January 1999 (aged 22)	42	22	(Germany) Rot-Weiss Köln
25	DF	Viktoria Huse	24 October 1995 (aged 25)	64	9	(Germany) Club an der Alster
28	MF	Jette Fleschütz	23 October 2002 (aged 18)	11	3	(Germany) Grosflottbek
30	DF	Hanna Granitzki	31 July 1997 (aged 23)	62	3	(Germany) Club an der Alster

Reserve:

- Nathalie Kubalski (GK)

=== Great Britain ===
The squad was announced on 17 June 2021.

Head coach: (United Kingdom) Mark Hager

No.	Pos.	Player	Date of birth (age)	Caps	Goals	Club
1	GK	Maddie Hinch	8 October 1988 (aged 32)	158	0	No club listed
4	MF	Laura Unsworth	8 March 1988 (aged 33)	276	11	(England) East Grinstead
5	MF	Sarah Evans	12 April 1991 (aged 30)	122	9	(England) Surbiton
6	DF	Anna Toman	29 April 1993 (aged 28)	91	7	(England) Wimbledon
7	FW	Hannah Martin	30 December 1994 (aged 26)	77	15	(England) Hampstead & Westminster
8	MF	Sarah Jones	25 June 1990 (aged 31)	129	13	(England) Holcombe
9	MF	Susannah Townsend	28 July 1989 (aged 31)	180	13	(England) Canterbury
10	FW	Sarah Robertson	27 September 1993 (aged 27)	158	13	(England) Hampstead & Westminster
13	FW	Elena Rayer	22 November 1996 (aged 24)	58	3	(England) East Grinstead
16	FW	Isabelle Petter	27 June 2000 (aged 21)	33	6	(England) Loughborough Students
17	DF	Leah Wilkinson	3 December 1986 (aged 34)	182	23	(England) Holcombe
18	DF	Giselle Ansley	31 March 1992 (aged 29)	165	23	(England) Surbiton
20	DF	Hollie Pearne-Webb (Captain)	19 September 1990 (aged 30)	191	8	No club listed
21	MF	Fiona Crackles	11 February 2000 (aged 21)	13	0	(England) Durham University
24	MF	Shona McCallin	18 May 1992 (aged 29)	93	3	No club listed
26	FW	Lily Owsley	10 December 1994 (aged 26)	164	36	(England) Hampstead & Westminster
31	DF	Grace Balsdon	13 April 1993 (aged 28)	81	7	(England) Hampstead & Westminster
32	DF	Amy Costello	14 January 1998 (aged 23)	88		(England) East Grinstead

Reserves:

- Sabbie Heesh (GK)
- Joanne Hunter

=== India ===
The squad was announced on 17 June 2021.

Head coach: (Netherlands) Sjoerd Marijne

No.	Pos.	Player	Date of birth (age)	Caps	Club
1	MF	Navjot Kaur	7 March 1995 (aged 26)	172	(India) Railway Sports Promotion Board
2	DF	Gurjit Kaur	25 October 1995 (aged 25)	87	(India) Railway Sports Promotion Board
3	DF	Deep Grace Ekka	3 June 1994 (aged 27)	202	(India) Railway Sports Promotion Board
4	MF	Monika Malik	5 November 1993 (aged 27)	150	(India) Hockey Haryana
7	FW	Sharmila Devi	10 October 2001 (aged 19)	9	(India) Hockey Him
8	DF	Nikki Pradhan	8 December 1993 (aged 27)	104	(India) Railway Sports Promotion Board
11	GK	Savita Punia	11 July 1990 (aged 31)	202	(India) Hockey Haryana
15	MF	Nisha Warsi	9 July 1995 (aged 26)	9	(India) Railway Sports Promotion Board
16	FW	Vandana Katariya	15 April 1992 (aged 29)	240	(India) Railway Sports Promotion Board
18	DF	Udita Duhan	14 January 1998 (aged 23)	32	(India) Hockey Haryana
20	FW	Lalremsiami	30 March 2000 (aged 21)	64	(India) Railway Sports Promotion Board
25	FW	Navneet Kaur	26 January 1996 (aged 25)	79	(India) Railway Sports Promotion Board
27	MF	Sushila Chanu	25 February 1992 (aged 29)	181	(India) Railway Sports Promotion Board
28	FW	Rani Rampal (Captain)	4 December 1994 (aged 26)	241	(India) Hockey Haryana
30	MF	Salima Tete	27 December 2001 (aged 19)	29	(India) Hockey Jharkhand
32	MF	Neha Goyal	15 November 1995 (aged 25)	75	(India) Railway Sports Promotion Board

=== Ireland ===
The squad was announced on 21 June 2021.

Head coach: (Australia) Sean Dancer

No.	Pos.	Player	Date of birth (age)	Caps	Goals	Club
1	GK	Ayeisha McFerran	10 January 1996 (aged 25)	105	{{{goals}}}	(Netherlands) Kampong
2	MF	Chloe Watkins	7 March 1992 (aged 29)	229	{{{goals}}}	(Republic of Ireland) Monkstown
3	DF	Hannah Matthews	24 March 1991 (aged 30)	152	{{{goals}}}	(Republic of Ireland) Loreto
4	FW	Sarah Torrans	14 February 1999 (aged 22)	26	{{{goals}}}	(Republic of Ireland) Loreto
5	MF	Nicola Daly	3 April 1988 (aged 33)	196	{{{goals}}}	(Republic of Ireland) Loreto
6	DF	Róisín Upton	1 April 1994 (aged 27)	81	{{{goals}}}	(Republic of Ireland) Catholic Institute
7	DF	Hannah McLoughlin	2 December 1999 (aged 21)	19	{{{goals}}}	(Republic of Ireland) UCD
8	FW	Deirdre Duke	9 June 1992 (aged 29)	146	{{{goals}}}	(Republic of Ireland) Old Alex
9	FW	Kathryn Mullan (Captain)	7 April 1994 (aged 27)	198	{{{goals}}}	(Republic of Ireland) Ballymoney
10	DF	Shirley McCay	7 June 1988 (aged 33)	311	{{{goals}}}	(Republic of Ireland) Pegasus
11	MF	Sarah Hawkshaw	4 November 1995 (aged 25)	38	{{{goals}}}	(Republic of Ireland) Railway Union
12	DF	Elena Tice	16 November 1997 (aged 23)	114	{{{goals}}}	(Republic of Ireland) Old Alex
13	FW	Naomi Carroll	13 September 1992 (aged 28)	115	{{{goals}}}	(Republic of Ireland) Catholic Institute
14	MF	Elizabeth Holden	4 January 1990 (aged 31)	201	{{{goals}}}	(Republic of Ireland) Belfast Harlequins
15	DF	Sarah McAuley	25 September 2001 (aged 19)	1	{{{goals}}}	(Republic of Ireland) Muckross
16	FW	Anna O'Flanagan	18 February 1990 (aged 31)	212	{{{goals}}}	(Republic of Ireland) Muckross
17	MF	Michelle Carey	5 May 1999 (aged 22)	5	{{{goals}}}	(Republic of Ireland) UCD
18	FW	Zara Malseed	11 June 1997 (aged 24)	2	{{{goals}}}	(Republic of Ireland) Ards

Reserve:

- Elizabeth Murphy (GK)

=== Netherlands ===
The squad was announced on 16 June 2021.

Head coach: (Australia) Alyson Annan

No.	Pos.	Player	Date of birth (age)	Caps	Goals	Club
3	DF	Sanne Koolen	23 March 1996 (aged 25)	49	0	(Netherlands) Den Bosch
4	DF	Freeke Moes	29 November 1998 (aged 22)	7	1	(Netherlands) Amsterdam
5	MF	Malou Pheninckx	24 July 1991 (aged 30)	100	3	(Netherlands) Kampong
6	MF	Laurien Leurink	13 November 1994 (aged 26)	113	26	(Netherlands) SCHC
7	MF	Xan de Waard	8 November 1995 (aged 25)	156	16	(Netherlands) SCHC
8	MF	Marloes Keetels	4 May 1993 (aged 28)	157	23	(Netherlands) Den Bosch
10	MF	Felice Albers	27 December 1999 (aged 21)	10	7	(Netherlands) Amsterdam
11	FW	Maria Verschoor	22 April 1994 (aged 27)	144	20	(Netherlands) Amsterdam
12	FW	Lidewij Welten	16 July 1990 (aged 31)	217	86	(Netherlands) Den Bosch
13	DF	Caia van Maasakker	5 April 1989 (aged 32)	204	66	(Netherlands) SCHC
15	FW	Frédérique Matla	28 December 1996 (aged 24)	82	55	(Netherlands) Den Bosch
18	DF	Pien Sanders	11 June 1998 (aged 23)	63	1	(Netherlands) Den Bosch
20	MF	Laura Nunnink	26 January 1995 (aged 26)	131	2	(Netherlands) Den Bosch
21	DF	Lauren Stam	30 January 1994 (aged 27)	97	8	(Netherlands) Amsterdam
22	GK	Josine Koning	2 September 1995 (aged 25)	78	0	(Netherlands) Den Bosch
23	DF	Margot van Geffen	23 November 1989 (aged 31)	210	15	(Netherlands) Den Bosch
24	MF	Eva de Goede (Captain)	23 March 1989 (aged 32)	241	32	(Netherlands) Amsterdam
29	DF	Stella van Gils	4 August 1999 (aged 21)	6		(Netherlands) Pinoké

Reserve:

- Anne Veenendaal (GK)

=== South Africa ===
The squad was announced on 27 May 2021.

Head coach: Robin Van Ginkel

No.	Pos.	Player	Date of birth (age)	Caps	Goals	Club
1	GK	Phumelela Mbande	8 March 1993 (aged 28)	47	{{{goals}}}	(South Africa) Northern Blues
3	FW	Celia Seerane	18 June 1990 (aged 31)	163	{{{goals}}}	(South Africa) Northern Blues
4	DF	Nicole Walraven	12 December 1994 (aged 26)	48	{{{goals}}}	(South Africa) Northern Blues
5	FW	Edith Molikoe	23 May 2000 (aged 21)	0	{{{goals}}}	(South Africa) Northern Blues
6	DF	Taryn Potts	19 April 1992 (aged 29)	5	{{{goals}}}	(South Africa) Southern Gauteng
7	MF	Marizen Marais	17 May 1996 (aged 25)	27	{{{goals}}}	(South Africa) Blyde River Bunters
8	MF	Kristen Paton	21 December 1996 (aged 24)	33	{{{goals}}}	(South Africa) Southern Gauteng
9	MF	Robyn Johnson	7 December 1990 (aged 30)	18	{{{goals}}}	(South Africa) Southern Gauteng
10	MF	Onthatile Zulu	14 March 2000 (aged 21)	10	{{{goals}}}	(South Africa) Northern Blues
13	DF	Lisa-Marié Deetlefs	8 September 1987 (aged 33)	267	{{{goals}}}	(South Africa) Southern Gauteng
14	FW	Nomnikelo Veto	3 January 1997 (aged 24)	18	{{{goals}}}	(South Africa) Southern Gauteng
16	MF	Erin Hunter (Captain)	20 March 1992 (aged 29)	59	{{{goals}}}	(South Africa) Southern Gauteng
17	FW	Charné Maddocks	10 June 1998 (aged 23)	0	{{{goals}}}	(South Africa) North-West University
19	MF	Lilian du Plessis	17 December 1992 (aged 28)	135	{{{goals}}}	(South Africa) Southern Gauteng
22	DF	Lerato Mahole	29 December 1999 (aged 21)	0	{{{goals}}}	(South Africa) Namaqualand Daisies
28	FW	Quanita Bobbs	3 September 1993 (aged 27)	132	{{{goals}}}	(South Africa) Western Province
29	DF	Tarryn Glasby	23 January 1995 (aged 26)	42	{{{goals}}}	(South Africa) Western Province
30	FW	Toni Marks	19 July 1994 (aged 27)	16	{{{goals}}}	(South Africa) Madikwe Rangers

Reserves:

- Marlize van Tonder (GK)

== Group B ==
=== Argentina ===
The squad was announced on 21 June 2021.

Head coach: Carlos Retegui

No.	Pos.	Player	Date of birth (age)	Caps	Goals	Club
1	GK	Belén Succi	16 October 1985 (aged 35)	240		(Argentina) River Plate
2	MF	Sofía Toccalino	20 March 1997 (aged 24)	95	7	(Argentina) St. Catherine's
3	DF	Agustina Gorzelany	11 March 1996 (aged 25)	55	17	(Argentina) San Martín
4	DF	Valentina Raposo	28 January 2003 (aged 18)	2	0	(Argentina) Popeye
5	MF	Agostina Alonso	1 October 1995 (aged 25)	89	5	(Argentina) Banco Nación
7	FW	Agustina Albertario	1 January 1993 (aged 28)	168	49	(Argentina) Lomas
10	FW	María José Granatto	21 April 1995 (aged 26)	134	73	(Argentina) Santa Bárbara
12	FW	Delfina Merino	15 October 1989 (aged 31)	296	96	(Argentina) Banco Provincia
17	MF	Rocío Sánchez Moccia	2 August 1988 (aged 32)	247	17	(Argentina) Liceo Naval
18	MF	Victoria Sauze	21 July 1991 (aged 30)	83	2	(Argentina) River Plate
21	FW	Victoria Granatto	9 April 1991 (aged 30)	26	7	(Argentina) Santa Bárbara
22	MF	Eugenia Trinchinetti	17 July 1997 (aged 24)	103	13	(Argentina) San Fernando
23	MF	Micaela Retegui	23 April 1996 (aged 25)	40	5	(Argentina) San Fernando
24	MF	Emilia Forcherio	16 February 1995 (aged 26)			(Argentina) Lomas
26	MF	Sofía Maccari	3 July 1984 (aged 37)			(Argentina) San Fernando
27	DF	Noel Barrionuevo (captain)	16 May 1984 (aged 37)	337	182	(Argentina) Newman
28	FW	Julieta Jankunas	20 January 1999 (aged 22)	102	45	(Argentina) Ciudad
32	DF	Valentina Costa Biondi	13 September 1995 (aged 25)	38	2	(Argentina) San Fernando

Reserves:

- Clara Barberi (GK)

=== Australia ===
The squad was announced on 14 June 2021.

Head coach: Katrina Powell

No.	Pos.	Player	Date of birth (age)	Caps	Goals	Club
2	FW	Ambrosia Malone	8 January 1998 (aged 23)	56	15	(Australia) Brisbane Blaze
3	FW	Brooke Peris	16 January 1993 (aged 28)	176	26	(Australia) Canberra Chill
4	MF	Amy Lawton	19 January 2002 (aged 19)	19	3	(Australia) HC Melbourne
8	MF	Georgia Wilson	20 May 1996 (aged 25)	43	0	(Australia) Perth Thundersticks
10	DF	Madison Fitzpatrick	14 December 1996 (aged 24)	80	17	(Australia) Queensland Scorchers
12	MF	Greta Hayes	17 October 1996 (aged 24)	14	0	(Australia) NSW Arrows
13	DF	Edwina Bone	29 April 1988 (aged 33)	206	5	(Australia) Canberra Chill
14	MF	Stephanie Kershaw	19 April 1995 (aged 26)	69	9	(Australia) Brisbane Blaze
15	DF	Kaitlin Nobbs	24 September 1997 (aged 23)	86	4	(Australia) NSW Pride
18	MF	Jane Claxton	26 October 1992 (aged 28)	186	18	(Australia) Adelaide Fire
20	DF	Karri Somerville	7 April 1999 (aged 22)	7	0	(Australia) Perth Thundersticks
21	MF	Renee Taylor	28 September 1996 (aged 24)	87	8	(Australia) Brisbane Blaze
22	DF	Kate Jenner	5 May 1990 (aged 31)	132	1	(Australia) NSW Pride
24	FW	Mariah Williams	31 May 1995 (aged 26)	88	17	(Australia) NSW Pride
26	FW	Emily Chalker	28 July 1992 (aged 28)	249	84	(Australia) NSW Pride
27	GK	Rachael Lynch	2 July 1986 (aged 35)	227	0	(Australia) HC Melbourne
30	FW	Grace Stewart	28 April 1997 (aged 24)	86	25	(Australia) NSW Pride
32	FW	Savannah Fitzpatrick	4 February 1995 (aged 26)	66	16	(Australia) Brisbane Blaze

Reserves:

- Jocelyn Bartram

=== China ===
Head coach: Wang Yang

No.	Pos.	Player	Date of birth (age)	Caps	Goals	Club
1	GK	Li Dongxiao	26 November 1987 (aged 33)	151	{{{goals}}}	
2	DF	Gu Bingfeng	25 January 1994 (aged 27)	100	{{{goals}}}	
5	FW	Li Jiaqi	1 July 1995 (aged 26)	101	{{{goals}}}	
6	DF	Zhang Ying	29 August 1998 (aged 22)	17	{{{goals}}}	
7	DF	Cui Qiuxia	11 September 1990 (aged 30)	182	{{{goals}}}	
9	MF	Xu Wenyu	6 December 1995 (aged 25)	75	{{{goals}}}	
10	FW	Peng Yang	17 January 1992 (aged 29)	198	{{{goals}}}	
11	FW	Liang Meiyu	8 January 1994 (aged 27)	181	{{{goals}}}	
13	FW	Li Hong	31 May 1999 (aged 22)	67	{{{goals}}}	
15	MF	Zhang Jinrong	24 March 1997 (aged 24)	129	{{{goals}}}	
16	DF	Ou Zixia	24 September 1995 (aged 25)	107	{{{goals}}}	
19	MF	Zhang Xiaoxue	13 December 1992 (aged 28)	154	{{{goals}}}	
21	FW	Liu Meng	17 December 1995 (aged 25)	30	{{{goals}}}	
24	MF	Wang Na	5 August 1994 (aged 26)	95	{{{goals}}}	
26	MF	Chen Yang	15 February 1997 (aged 24)	52	{{{goals}}}	
28	FW	Luo Tiantian	12 July 1995 (aged 26)	12	{{{goals}}}	
29	FW	Chen Yi	28 January 1997 (aged 24)	38	{{{goals}}}	
31	MF	Zhong Jiaqi	23 September 1999 (aged 21)	53	{{{goals}}}	

=== Japan ===
The squad was announced on 8 June 2021.

Head coach: (Spain) Xavier Arnau

No.	Pos.	Player	Date of birth (age)	Caps	Goals	Club
1	DF	Yu Asai	8 January 1996 (aged 25)	78	{{{goals}}}	(Japan) Coca-Cola Red Sparks
3	DF	Kimika Hoshi	26 January 1996 (aged 25)	46	{{{goals}}}	(Japan) Sony H.C. BRAVIA Ladies
6	DF	Emi Nishikori	9 January 1993 (aged 28)	73	{{{goals}}}	(Japan) Coca-Cola Red Sparks
7	FW	Kana Nomura	23 March 1990 (aged 31)	128	{{{goals}}}	(Japan) Southern Metropolis Silver Shooting Stars
8	MF	Yukari Mano (captain)	4 March 1994 (aged 27)	124	{{{goals}}}	(Japan) Sony H.C. BRAVIA Ladies
9	FW	Yuri Nagai	26 May 1992 (aged 29)	179	{{{goals}}}	(Japan) Sony H.C. BRAVIA Ladies
10	MF	Hazuki Nagai	15 August 1994 (aged 26)	173	{{{goals}}}	(Japan) Sony H.C. BRAVIA Ladies
11	DF	Shihori Oikawa	12 March 1989 (aged 32)	133	{{{goals}}}	(Japan) Tokyo Verdy Hockey Team
13	DF	Miki Kozuka	13 January 1996 (aged 25)	65	{{{goals}}}	(Japan) GlaxoSmithKline Orange United
14	MF	Maho Segawa	23 June 1996 (aged 25)	46	{{{goals}}}	(Japan) Tokyo Verdy Hockey Team
15	FW	Mai Toriyama	13 April 1995 (aged 26)	15	{{{goals}}}	(Japan) Southern Metropolis Silver Shooting Stars
16	DF	Natsuha Matsumoto	31 July 1995 (aged 25)	43	{{{goals}}}	(Japan) Coca-Cola Red Sparks
17	FW	Aki Yamada	24 November 1992 (aged 28)	27	{{{goals}}}	(Japan) Coca-Cola Red Sparks
18	FW	Aki Mitsuhashi	12 September 1989 (aged 31)		{{{goals}}}	
19	FW	Kanon Mori	1 May 1996 (aged 25)	28	{{{goals}}}	(Japan) Coca-Cola Red Sparks
25	FW	Kaho Tanaka	25 October 1997 (aged 23)		{{{goals}}}	
29	MF	Sakurako Omoto	19 March 1998 (aged 23)	31	{{{goals}}}	(Japan) Coca-Cola Red Sparks
32	GK	Sakiyo Asano	26 May 1987 (aged 34)	111	{{{goals}}}	(Japan) Gifu Morning Ladies

=== New Zealand ===
The squad was announced on 10 June 2021.

Head coach: (Ireland) Graham Shaw

No.	Pos.	Player	Date of birth (age)	Caps	Goals	Club
1	DF	Tarryn Davey	29 February 1996 (aged 25)	66	1	(New Zealand) Hauraki Mavericks
2	FW	Olivia Shannon	23 May 2001 (aged 20)	29	4	(New Zealand) Central Falcons
4	FW	Olivia Merry	16 March 1992 (aged 29)	236	113	(New Zealand) Southern Alpiners
5	DF	Frances Davies	18 October 1996 (aged 24)	81	0	(New Zealand) Southern Alpiners
6	FW	Hope Ralph	14 April 2000 (aged 21)	11	2	(New Zealand) Central Falcons
8	MF	Julia King	8 December 1992 (aged 28)	125	9	(New Zealand) Hauraki Mavericks
12	DF	Ella Gunson	9 July 1989 (aged 32)	224	11	(New Zealand) Northern Tridents
13	MF	Sam Charlton	7 December 1991 (aged 29)	255	8	(New Zealand) Midlands
15	GK	Grace O'Hanlon	10 September 1992 (aged 28)	63	0	(New Zealand) Hauraki Mavericks
16	DF	Elizabeth Thompson	8 December 1994 (aged 26)	191	12	(New Zealand) Hauraki Mavericks
17	DF	Stephanie Dickins	9 January 1995 (aged 26)	27	2	(New Zealand) Northern Tridents
19	DF	Tessa Jopp	18 June 1995 (aged 26)	26	1	(New Zealand) Southern Alpiners
20	DF	Megan Hull	12 May 1996 (aged 25)	35	1	(New Zealand) Central Falcons
22	MF	Katie Doar	11 September 2001 (aged 19)	19	0	(New Zealand) Northern Tridents
24	MF	Rose Keddell	31 January 1994 (aged 27)	211	16	(New Zealand) Hauraki Mavericks
25	MF	Kelsey Smith	11 August 1994 (aged 26)	99	14	(New Zealand) Central Falcons
27	FW	Holly Pearson	7 September 1998 (aged 22)	24	0	(New Zealand) Central Falcons
31	MF	Stacey Michelsen (Captain)	18 February 1991 (aged 30)	291	34	(New Zealand) Northern Tridents

=== Spain ===
The squad was announced on 5 July 2021.

Head coach: (United Kingdom) Adrian Lock

No.	Pos.	Player	Date of birth (age)	Caps	Goals	Club
1	GK	María Ruiz	18 March 1990 (aged 31)	157	{{{goals}}}	(Spain) Club de Campo
2	MF	Laura Barrios	4 September 2000 (aged 20)	0	{{{goals}}}	(Spain) Club de Campo
4	MF	Clara Ycart	10 January 1999 (aged 22)	54	{{{goals}}}	(Spain) CD Terrassa
7	FW	Carlota Petchame	25 June 1990 (aged 31)	200	{{{goals}}}	(Spain) Junior
9	DF	María López García	16 February 1990 (aged 31)	193	{{{goals}}}	(Spain) Club de Campo
10	FW	Berta Bonastre	3 June 1992 (aged 29)	193	{{{goals}}}	(Spain) Club Egara
12	FW	Carmen Cano	31 December 1992 (aged 28)		{{{goals}}}	
13	FW	Belén Iglesias	6 July 1996 (aged 25)	53	{{{goals}}}	(Germany) Großflottbek
16	DF	Candela Mejías	27 January 1997 (aged 24)	22	{{{goals}}}	(Spain) Club de Campo
17	DF	Lola Riera	25 June 1991 (aged 30)	184	{{{goals}}}	(Spain) Complutense
18	MF	Júlia Pons	27 July 1994 (aged 26)	169	{{{goals}}}	(Spain) CD Terrassa
19	FW	Begoña García Grau	19 July 1995 (aged 26)	135	{{{goals}}}	(Spain) Club de Campo
20	DF	Xantal Giné	23 September 1992 (aged 28)		{{{goals}}}	
21	MF	Beatriz Pérez	4 May 1991 (aged 30)	206	{{{goals}}}	(Spain) Club de Campo
23	MF	Georgina Oliva (Captain)	18 July 1990 (aged 31)	235	{{{goals}}}	(Spain) Junior
24	MF	Alejandra Torres-Quevedo	30 September 1999 (aged 21)	43	{{{goals}}}	(Spain) Club de Campo
25	FW	Alicia Magaz	24 May 1994 (aged 27)	105	{{{goals}}}	(Spain) Club de Campo
29	MF	Lucía Jiménez	8 January 1997 (aged 24)	125	{{{goals}}}	(Spain) Complutense

Reserves:

- Melaní García
