= 2022 Women's Euro Hockey League =

Euro Hockey League Women, Europe's premier women's club field hockey tournament

2022 Euro Hockey League Women
Tournament details
- Host country: Netherlands
- City: Amstelveen
- Dates: 15–18 April
- Teams: 8 (from 6 associations)
- Venue: Wagener Stadium

Final positions
- Champions: (Netherlands) Amsterdam (1st title)
- Runner-up: (Netherlands) Den Bosch
- Third place: (Spain) Junior

Tournament statistics
- Matches played: 10
- Goals scored: 35 (3.5 per match)
- Top scorer: (Netherlands) Frédérique Matla (8 goals)

The 2022 Women's Euro Hockey League was the second edition of the Women's Euro Hockey League, Europe's premier women's club field hockey tournament, organized by the European Hockey Federation.

It was contested alongside the men's tournament at the Wagener Stadium in Amstelveen, Netherlands from 15 to 18 April 2022.

Den Bosch, who entered the event as the defending champions, reached the finals, where they were defeated 3–2 by Amsterdam in a shoot-out after the match finished 2–2 in regular time. Junior won their first EHL medal by defeating Gantoise 2–1 in the bronze medal match.

== Association team allocation ==
A total of 8 teams from 6 of the 45 EHF member associations would participate in the 2022 EHL Women. The association rankings based on the EHL country coefficients was used to determine the number of participating teams for each association:

- Associations 1–2 each had two teams qualify.
- Associations 3–6 each had one team qualify.

=== Teams ===
- (Belgium) Gantoise
- (England) Surbiton
- (Germany) Düsseldorfer HC
- (Ireland) Pegasus
- (Netherlands) Amsterdam
- (Netherlands) Den Bosch
- (Spain) Club de Campo
- (Spain) Junior

== Results ==
=== Bracket ===
Quarter-finals
15 April
(Netherlands) Den Bosch	9
(Ireland) Pegasus	0
15 April
(Belgium) Gantoise	2
(England) Surbiton	1
15 April
(Germany) Düsseldorfer HC	0 (1)
(Spain) Junior (s.o.)	0 (2)
15 April
(Netherlands) Amsterdam (s.o.)	1 (2)
(Spain) Club de Campo	1 (0)

Semi-finals
17 April
(Netherlands) Den Bosch	2
(Belgium) Gantoise	0
16 April
(Spain) Junior	1
(Netherlands) Amsterdam	2

Final
18 April
(Netherlands) Den Bosch	2 (2)
(Netherlands) Amsterdam (s.o.)	2 (3)
Bronze medal match
18 April
(Belgium) Gantoise	1
(Spain) Junior	2

=== Quarter-finals ===
15 April 2022
09:30

Gantoise (Belgium)	2–1	(England) Surbiton
Vanden Borre 1'; Sinia 12'	Report	Bourne 11'

Umpires:
Michelle Meister (GER)
Shane O'Donnell (IRL)

15 April 2022
11:30

Den Bosch (Netherlands)	9–0	(Ireland) Pegasus
Matla 12', 15', 24', 27', 45'; Burg 13'; Welten 14' van der Plas 17', 43'	Report

Umpires:
Sean Edwards (ENG)
Ivona Makar (CRO)

15 April 2022
16:00

Amsterdam (Netherlands)	1–1	(Spain) Club de Campo
De Haan 32'	Report	Mejías 20'
Penalties
Albers (penalty shoot-out missed); Verschoor (penalty shoot-out missed); Moes (penalty shoot-out scored); De Baat (penalty shoot-out scored)	2–0	(penalty shoot-out missed) Magaz; (penalty shoot-out missed) García Grau; (penalty shoot-out missed) L. Barrios; (penalty shoot-out missed) López García

Umpires:
Alison Keogh (IRL)
Sebastien Michielsen (BEL)

15 April 2022
18:15

Düsseldorfer HC (Germany)	0–0	(Spain) Junior
	Report
Penalties
Schubert (penalty shoot-out missed); Gräve (penalty shoot-out scored); Strauss (penalty shoot-out missed); Stoffelsma (penalty shoot-out missed); Oruz (penalty shoot-out missed)	1–2	(penalty shoot-out missed) M. Serrahima; (penalty shoot-out scored) Oliva; (penalty shoot-out missed) Strappato; (penalty shoot-out missed) Vidosa; (penalty shoot-out scored) Petchamé

Umpires:
Laurine Delforge (BEL)
Xavier Fenaert (FRA)

=== Ranking matches ===
16 April 2022
11:30

Pegasus (Ireland)	1–2	(England) Surbiton
K. McKee 59'	Report	Dowthwaite 37'; Evans 39'

Umpires:
Tim Meissner (GER)
Sebastien Michielsen (BEL)

17 April 2022
09:30

Düsseldorfer HC (Germany)	3–3	(Spain) Club de Campo
Nolte 17', 26'; Strauss 30'	Report	Cano 18'; García Grau 42', 60'
Penalties
Ycart (penalty shoot-out missed); Gräve (penalty shoot-out scored); Strauss (penalty shoot-out scored); Oruz (penalty shoot-out missed)	2–1	(penalty shoot-out scored) B. Pérez; (penalty shoot-out missed) Torres-Quevedo; (penalty shoot-out missed) Magaz; (penalty shoot-out missed) García Grau; (penalty shoot-out missed) Cano

Umpires:
Sean Edwards (ENG)
Xavier Fenaert (FRA)

=== Semi-finals ===
16 April 2022
13:45

Den Bosch (Netherlands)	2–0	(Belgium) Gantoise
Krekelaar 39'; Matla 46'	Report

Umpires:
Ivona Makar (CRO)
Michelle Meister (GER)

17 April 2022
11:45

Junior (Spain)	1–2	(Netherlands) Amsterdam
García 17'	Report	Van der Elst 35'; Moes 45'

Umpires:
Alison Keogh (IRL)
Sarah Wilson (SCO)

=== Bronze medal match ===
18 April 2022
09:15

Gantoise (Belgium)	1–2	(Spain) Junior
A. S. Vanden Borre 28'	Report	B. Serrahima 19'; García 47'

Umpires:
Xavier Fenaert (FRA)
Ivona Makar (CRO)

=== Final ===
18 April 2022
13:45

Den Bosch (Netherlands)	2–2	(Netherlands) Amsterdam
Matla 5', 25'	Report	Tuzgöl 18'; Van der Elst 41'
Penalties
Sanders (penalty shoot-out scored); Matla (penalty shoot-out scored); Van Geffen (penalty shoot-out missed); Welten (penalty shoot-out missed); Omrani (penalty shoot-out missed)	2–3	(penalty shoot-out missed) Albers; (penalty shoot-out scored) Verschoor; (penalty shoot-out scored) De Haan; (penalty shoot-out scored) De Baat

Umpires:
Laurine Delforge (BEL)
Alison Keogh (IRL)

== Top goalscorers ==
Rank	Player	Team	FG	PC	PS	Goals
1	(Netherlands) Frédérique Matla	(Netherlands) Den Bosch	3	4	1	8
2	(Netherlands) Pleun van der Plas	(Netherlands) Den Bosch	2	0	0	2
2	(Netherlands) Fay van der Elst	(Netherlands) Amsterdam	2	0	0	2
2	(Spain) Begoña García Grau	(Spain) Club de Campo	1	1	0	2
2	(Spain) Maialen García	(Spain) Junior	1	1	0	2
2	(Germany) Lisa Nolte	(Germany) Düsseldorfer HC	0	2	0	2

== See also ==
- 2022 Men's Euro Hockey League
- 2022 Women's EuroHockey Club Trophy
- 2022 Women's EuroHockey Indoor Club Cup
