= 2021–22 Copa de la Reina de Hockey Hierba =

2021–22 Copa de la Reina
Tournament details
- Host country: Spain
- City: Barcelona
- Dates: 12–14 November 2021
- Teams: 8
- Venue(s): Real Club de Polo

Final positions
- Champions: Club de Campo (18th title)
- Runner-up: Júnior
- Third place: Club Egara

Tournament statistics
- Matches played: 8
- Goals scored: 29 (3.63 per match)
- Top scorer(s): Carmen Cano; Begoña García Grau (3 goals)
- Best player: María López

The 2021–22 Copa de la Reina was the 37th edition of the Copa de la Reina, Spain's annual field hockey cup competition for women. It was held from 12 to 14 November 2021, at Real Club de Polo in Barcelona.

Club de Campo won the tournament for a record 18th time, defeating Júnior 4–2 in the final. Club Egara finished in third place after defeating UD Taburiente 1–0.

== Qualified teams ==
The tournament was contested by the top eight ranked teams from the first half of the 2021–22 season of the Liga Iberdrola.

- Club de Campo
- Club Egara
- Júnior
- Real Club de Polo
- Real Sociedad
- Sanse Complutense
- Sardinero
- UD Taburiente

== Officials ==
The following umpires were appointed by the RFEH to officiate the tournament:

- Sandra Adell (ESP)
- Noelia Blanco (ESP)
- Gema Calderón (ESP)
- María Mercedes Romero (ESP)
- Ana Ortega (ESP)
- Cristina Pérez (ESP)
- Montserrat Solórzano (ESP)
- Laura Trujillo (ESP)

== Results ==
=== Knockouts ===
Quarter-finals
12 November 2021
Club Egara	4
Real Sociedad	2
12 November 2021
Júnior (pen.)	1 (5)
Real Club de Polo	1 (4)
12 November 2021
Club de Campo	5
Sardinero	1
12 November 2021
UD Taburiente (pen.)	1 (5)
Sanse Complutense	1 (4)

Semi-finals
13 November 2021
Club Egara	1
Júnior	2
13 November 2021
Club de Campo	2
UD Taburiente	1

Final
14 November 2021
Júnior	2
Club de Campo	4
Third place
14 November 2021
Club Egara	1
UD Taburiente	0

==== Quarterfinals ====
12 November 2021
11:00

Club Egara	4–2	Real Sociedad
Llobet 4'; Bonastre 24', 51'; Willig 68'	Report	Ruggieri 65'; Gárate 66'

Umpires:
María Mercedes Romero (ESP)
Ana Ortega (ESP)

12 November 2021
13:00

Júnior	1–1	Real Club de Polo
García 61'	Report	Giné 67'
Penalties
	5–4

Umpires:
Gema Calderón (ESP)
Noelia Blanco (ESP)

12 November 2021
15:00

Club de Campo	5–1	Sardinero
García 2'; López 6'; Cano 30'; S. Barrios 56'; Abajo 63'	Report	De Felice 28'

Umpires:
Laura Trujillo (ESP)
Cristina Pérez (ESP)

12 November 2021
17:00

UD Taburiente	1–1	Sanse Complutense
Gorzelany 8'	Report	Riera 14'
Penalties
	5–4

Umpires:
Montserrat Solórzano (ESP)
Sandra Adell (ESP)

=== First to fourth place classification ===
==== Semi-finals ====
13 November 2021
11:00

Club Egara	1–2	Júnior
Grau 11'	Report	M. Serrahima 17'; Vidosa 46'

Umpires:
Gema Calderón (ESP)
María Mercedes Romero (ESP)

13 November 2021
13:00

Club de Campo	2–1	UD Taburiente
García 37'; Be. Pérez 51'	Report	Gorzelany 22'

Umpires:
Sandra Adell (ESP)
Laura Trujillo (ESP)

==== Third and fourth place ====
14 November 2021
09:00

Club Egara	1–0	UD Taburiente
Salvatella 66'	Report

Umpires:
Noelia Blanco (ESP)
Ana Ortega (ESP)

==== Final ====
14 November 2021
11:00

Júnior	2–4	Club de Campo
Petchamé 17'; Gil 50'	Report	Cano 6', 62'; Abajo 28'; García 40'

Umpires:
Sandra Adell (ESP)
Gema Calderón (ESP)

== Awards ==
Top Goalscorers	Player of the Tournament	Goalkeeper of the Tournament	Most Promising Player
Begoña García Grau(CDC); Carmen Cano (CDC)	María López (CDC)	María Ruíz (CDC)	Laura Bosch (JÚN)
