= 2018–19 Copa de la Reina de Hockey Hierba =

2018–19 Copa de la Reina
Tournament details
- Host country: Spain
- City: Madrid
- Dates: 22–24 March 2019
- Teams: 8
- Venue(s): Club de Campo

Final positions
- Champions: Club de Campo (16th title)
- Runner-up: Real Club de Polo
- Third place: UD Taburiente

Tournament statistics
- Matches played: 8
- Goals scored: 29 (3.63 per match)
- Top scorer(s): Marta Segú (3 goals)
- Best player: Begoña García

The 2018–19 Copa de la Reina was the 34th edition of the Copa de la Reina, Spain's annual field hockey cup competition for women. It was held from 22 to 24 March 1029 in Madrid, at Club de Campo.

Club de Campo won the tournament for the 16th time, defeating Real Club de Polo 5–2 in the final. UD Taburiente finished in third place after defeating Júnior 3–2 in penalties following a 0–0 draw.

== Qualified teams ==
The tournament was contested by the top eight ranked teams from the first half of the 2018–19 season of the Liga Iberdrola.

- Atlètic Terrassa
- CD Terrassa
- Club de Campo
- Júnior
- Real Club de Polo
- Real Sociedad
- Sanse Complutense
- UD Taburiente

== Officials ==
The following umpires were appointed by the RFEH to officiate the tournament:

- Sandra Adell (ESP)
- Gema Calderón (ESP)
- Pilar López (ESP)
- María Mercedes Romero (ESP)
- Cristina Pérez (ESP)
- Núria Ribó (ESP)
- Montserrat Solórzano (ESP)
- Laura Trujillo (ESP)

== Results ==
=== Knockouts ===
Quarter-finals
22 March 2019
CD Terrassa	1 (1)
Júnior (pen.)	1 (3)
22 March 2019
Real Sociedad	0
Real Club de Polo	6
22 March 2019
UD Taburiente	2
Sanse Complutense	1
22 March 2019
Club de Campo	4
Atlètic Terrassa	1

Semi-finals
23 March 2019
Júnior	0
Real Club de Polo	4
23 March 2019
UD Taburiente	0
Club de Campo	2

Final
24 March 2019
Real Club de Polo	2
Club de Campo	4
Third place
24 March 2019
Júnior	0 (2)
UD Taburiente (pen.)	0 (3)

==== Quarterfinals ====
22 March 2019
11:00

CD Terrassa	1–1	Júnior
Strappato 22'	Report	Piris 3'
Penalties
Ycart (penalty shoot-out missed); Bosque (penalty shoot-out missed); Pons (penalty shoot-out missed); Bruguera (penalty shoot-out scored)	1–3	(penalty shoot-out missed) Bosch; (penalty shoot-out scored) Grau; (penalty shoot-out missed) Petchamé; (penalty shoot-out scored) B. Serrahima; (penalty shoot-out scored) M. Serrahima

Umpires:
Sandra Adell (ESP)
Núria Ribó (ESP)

22 March 2019
12:45

Real Sociedad	0–6	Real Club de Polo
	Report	Segú 8', 44'; Verbruggen 19'; Zaldúa 25'; Laurito 55'; Sofía 65'

Umpires:
Gema Calderón (ESP)
Cristina Pérez (ESP)

22 March 2019
14:45

UD Taburiente	2–1	Sanse Complutense
Ortíz 30'; Juárez 55'	Report	Riera 60'

Umpires:
María Mercedes Romero (ESP)
Laura Trujillo (ESP)

22 March 2019
16:30

Club de Campo	4–1	Atlètic Terrassa
García 5'; Cano 12'; S. Barrios 43'; Abajo 59'	Report	Torrent 34'

Umpires:
Pilar López (ESP)
Montserrat Solórzano (ESP)

=== First to fourth place classification ===
==== Semi-finals ====
23 March 2019
15:00

Júnior	0–4	Real Club de Polo
	Report	Segú 39'; Vives 48', 57'; De Camps 70'

Umpires:
Laura Trujillo (ESP)
María Mercedes Romero (ESP)

23 March 2019
17:00

UD Taburiente	0–2	Club de Campo
	Report	Cano 13'; Pérez 38'

Umpires:
Gema Calderón (ESP)
Sandra Adell (ESP)

==== Third and fourth place ====
23 March 2019
09:00

Júnior	0–0	UD Taburiente
	Report
Penalties
Petchamé (penalty shoot-out missed); Bosch (penalty shoot-out missed); Grau (penalty shoot-out scored); Vidos (penalty shoot-out scored); M. Serrahima (penalty shoot-out missed)	2–3	(penalty shoot-out missed) Juárez; (penalty shoot-out scored) Guerra; (penalty shoot-out missed) Zanni; (penalty shoot-out scored) N. Deníz; (penalty shoot-out scored) Ortíz

Umpires:
Montserrat Solórzano (ESP)
Pilar López (ESP)

==== Final ====
23 March 2019
13:00

Real Club de Polo	2–5	Club de Campo
Zaldúa 9'; Verbruggen 49'	Report	S. Barrios 7'; López 11', 38'; García 42'; Abajo 45'

Umpires:
Núria Ribó (ESP)
María Mercedes Romero (ESP)

== Awards ==
Top Goalscorer	Player of the Tournament	Goalkeeper of the Tournament
Marta Segú (RCP)	Begoña García (CDC)	Marina Helguera (UDT)
