= 2019 Women's EuroHockey Club Trophy =

Tournament details
- Host country: England
- City: Rochester
- Dates: 19–22 April
- Teams: 8 (from 8 associations)
- Venue: Holcombe Hockey Club

Final positions
- Champions: (Spain) Club de Campo (1st title)
- Runner-up: (England) Holcombe
- Third place: (Belgium) Waterloo Ducks

Tournament statistics
- Matches played: 16
- Goals scored: 83 (5.19 per match)
- Top scorer: (Spain) Carmen Cano (6 goals)
- Best player: (Russia) Bogdana Sadovaia

The 2019 Women's EuroHockey Club Trophy was the 43rd edition of the women's Women's EuroHockey Club Trophy, Europe's secondary club field hockey tournament organized by the EHF. It was held from 19 to 22 April 2019 in Rochester, England.

Campo de Madrid won the tournament after defeating Holcombe 3–1 in the final. Waterloo Ducks finished third, after defeating UCD 2–0 in the third place playoff.

== Teams ==
- (Belarus) Victorya Smolevichi
- (Belgium) Waterloo Ducks
- (England) Holcombe
- (Ireland) UCD
- (Russia) Moscomsport
- (Scotland) Edinburgh
- (Spain) Club de Campo
- (Ukraine) Sumchanka

== Results ==
=== Preliminary round ===
==== Pool A ====
Pos	Team	Pld	W	D	L	GF	GA	GD	Pts	Qualification
1	(England) Holcombe (H)	3	2	1	0	10	3	+7	12	Final
2	(Ireland) UCD	3	1	1	1	8	5	+3	7	
3	(Russia) Moscomsport	3	1	1	1	8	10	−2	7	
4	(Scotland) Edinburgh	3	0	1	2	4	12	−8	2	

Source: EHF
(H) Hosts

19 April 2019
15:30

Moscomsport (Russia)	3–3	(Scotland) Edinburgh
Sadovaia 45'; Khalimova 48'; Frolova 57'	Report	McKie 15'; Malseed 25'; Maunder 37'

Umpires:
Elena Ozerskaia (BLR)
Anne van den Bosch (BEL)

19 April 2019
17:45

Holcombe (England)	1–1	(Ireland) UCD
Chamberlain 1'	Report	Curran 33'

Umpires:
Lisette Baljon (NED)
Katie Howie (SCO)

20 April 2019
14:30

UCD (Ireland)	5–1	(Scotland) Edinburgh
Young 9'; N. Carey 21'; Heisterkamp 34'; McGuire 38'; M. Carey 47'	Report	McKie 55'

Umpires:
Rebecca Woodcock (ENG)
Anne van den Bosch (BEL)

20 April 2019
16:45

Moscomsport (Russia)	2–5	(England) Holcombe
Stepanenko 6'; Sadovaia 48'	Report	Viarengo-Cervino 13'; Jones 29'; Wilkinson 31'; Trunks 34'; Elliott 37'

Umpires:
Sandra Adell (ESP)
Lelia Sacre (CAN)

21 April 2019
14:30

UCD (Ireland)	2–3	(Russia) Moscomsport
McGuire 50'; Patton 52'	Report	Stepanenko 19'; Khalimova 30'; Shaburova 53'

Umpires:
Lisette Baljon (NED)
Anne van den Bosch (BEL)

21 April 2019
16:45

Holcombe (England)	4–0	(Scotland) Edinburgh
Wilkinson 25'; Bingham 33'; Trunks 46'; Viarengo-Cervino 57'	Report

Umpires:
Elena Ozerskaia (UKR)
Sandra Adell (ESP)

==== Pool B ====
Pos	Team	Pld	W	D	L	GF	GA	GD	Pts	Qualification
1	(Spain) Campo de Madrid	3	3	0	0	18	0	+18	15	Final
2	(Belgium) Waterloo Ducks	3	2	0	1	10	10	0	10	
3	(Belarus) Victorya Smolevichi	3	1	0	2	6	7	−1	5	
4	(Ukraine) Sumchanka	3	0	0	3	1	18	−17	0	

Source: EHF

19 April 2019
11:00

Victorya Smolevichi (Belarus)	1–2	(Belgium) Waterloo Ducks
Kasabutskaya 12'	Report	Vouche 44'; Ronquetti 47'

Umpires:
Rebecca Woodcock (ENG)
Sandra Adell (ESP)

19 April 2019
13:15

Club de Campo (Spain)	5–0	(Ukraine) Sumchanka
García 2'; Medina 10'; Cano 20'; L. Barrios 36'; El. Gil 56'	Report

Umpires:
Elvira Mamina (RUS)
Lelia Sacre (CAN)

20 April 2019
10:00

Sumchanka (Ukraine)	0–8	(Belgium) Waterloo Ducks
	Report	Comerma 2'; Sinia 15', 55'; Gose 42', 51'; Ronquetti 45'; Peeters 57'; Stappaerts 60'

Umpires:
Fiona Davitt (IRE)
Katie Howie (SCO)

20 April 2019
12:15

Victorya Smolevichi (Belarus)	0–4	(Spain) Club de Campo
	Report	García 10'; López 47'; Cano 47', 59'

Umpires:
Svitlana Arutiunova (UKR)
Lisette Baljon (NED)

21 April 2019
10:00

Club de Campo (Spain)	9–0	(Belgium) Waterloo Ducks
García 3', 49'; Cano 8', 15', 32'; L. Barrios 10'; Em. Gil 20'; Pérez 50'; Abajo Saenz 60'	Report

Umpires:
Lelia Sacre (CAN)
Fiona Davitt (IRE)

21 April 2019
12:15

Sumchanka (Ukraine)	1–5	(Belarus) Victorya Smolevichi
Shevchenko 19'	Report	Sashko 14'; Zabrotskaya 16'; Mikheichyk 41'; Batsiukova 50'; Batura 53'

Umpires:
Elvira Mamina (RUS)
Rebecca Woodcock (ENG)

=== Classification round ===
==== Seventh and eighth place ====
22 April 2019
08:30

Edinburgh (Scotland)	2–3	(Ukraine) Sumchanka
Halliday 34'; Malseed 49'	Report	Moroz 15'; Honcharenko 23'; Shevchenko 34'

Umpires:
Elvira Mamina (RUS)
Anne van den Bosch (BEL)

==== Fifth and sixth place ====
22 April 2019
10:45

Moscomsport (Russia)	4–3	(Belarus) Victorya Smolevichi
Sadovaia 7', 23'; Goryacheva 38'; Stepanenko 38'	Report	Mikheichyk 9', 14'; Syddykava 34'

Umpires:
Katie Howie (SCO)
Sandra Adell (ESP)

==== Third and fourth place ====
22 April 2019
13:00

UCD (Ireland)	0–2	(Belgium) Waterloo Ducks
	Report	Ronquetti 30'; Vouche 45'

Umpires:
Rebecca Woodcock (ENG)
Lelia Sacre (CAN)

==== Final ====
22 April 2019
15:15

Holcombe (England)	1–3	(Spain) Club de Campo
Viarengo-Cervino 49'	Report	Em. Gil 9'; García 35'; Torrres-Quevedo 47'

Umpires:
Fiona Davitt (IRE)
Lisette Baljon (NED)

== Statistics ==
=== Awards ===
Player of the Tournament	Top Goalscorer	Goalkeeper of the Tournament
(Russia) Bogdana Sadovaia (Moscomsport)	(Spain) Carmen Cano (Club de Campo)	(Spain) María Ruiz (Campo de Madrid)

=== Final standings ===
Pos	Team	Pld	W	D	L	GF	GA	GD	Pts	Final Result
1st place, gold medalist(s)	(Spain) Club de Campo	4	4	0	0	21	1	+20	20	Gold Medal
2nd place, silver medalist(s)	(England) Holcombe (H)	4	2	1	1	11	6	+5	12	Silver Medal
3rd place, bronze medalist(s)	(Belgium) Waterloo Ducks	4	3	0	1	12	10	+2	15	Bronze Medal
4	(Ireland) UCD	4	1	1	2	8	7	+1	7	Fourth Place
5	(Russia) Moscomsport	4	2	1	1	12	13	−1	12	Fifth place
6	(Belarus) Victorya Smolevichi	4	1	0	3	9	11	−2	5	Sixth Place
7	(Ukraine) Sumchanka	4	1	0	3	4	20	−16	5	Seventh Place
8	(Scotland) Edinburgh	4	0	1	3	6	15	−9	2	Eighth Place

Source: EHF
(H) Hosts
