= 2020–21 Copa de la Reina de Hockey Hierba =

2020–21 Copa de la Reina
Tournament details
- Host country: Spain
- City: Valencia
- Dates: 11–13 December 2020
- Teams: 8
- Venue(s): Estadio Beteró; CH Tarongers

Final positions
- Champions: Júnior (2nd title)
- Runner-up: Club de Campo
- Third place: CD Terrassa

Tournament statistics
- Matches played: 8
- Goals scored: 18 (2.25 per match)
- Top scorer(s): Mariona Serrahima (2 goals)
- Best player: Georgina Oliva

The 2020–21 Copa de la Reina was the 36th edition of the Copa de la Reina, Spain's annual field hockey cup competition for women. It was held from 11 to 13 December 2020 in Valencia, at the Estadio Beteró and CH Tarongers.

Júnior won the tournament for the second time, defeating Club de Campo 2–1 in the final. CD Terrassa finished in third place after defeating Club Egara 2–0 in penalties following a 0–0 draw.

== Qualified teams ==
The tournament was contested by the top eight ranked teams from the first half of the 2020–21 season of the Liga Iberdrola.

- CD Terrassa
- Club de Campo
- Club Egara
- Júnior
- Real Club de Polo
- Sanse Complutense
- Sardinero
- UD Taburiente

== Officials ==
The following umpires were appointed by the RFEH to officiate the tournament:

- Sandra Adell (ESP)
- Noelia Blanco (ESP)
- Gema Calderón (ESP)
- Pilar López (ESP)
- María Mercedes Romero (ESP)
- Ana Ortega (ESP)
- Nayra Rodríguez (ESP)
- Laura Trujillo (ESP)

== Results ==
=== Knockouts ===
Quarter-finals
11 December 2020
CD Terrassa	2
Real Club de Polo	1
11 December 2020
Sanse Complutense	1
Júnior	2
11 December 2020
Club de Campo	3
Sardinero	0
11 December 2020
Club Egara	1
UD Taburiente	0

Semi-finals
12 December 2020
CD Terrassa	0
Júnior	4
12 December 2020
Club de Campo	1
Club Egara	0

Final
13 December 2020
Júnior	2
Club de Campo	1
Third place
13 December 2020
CD Terrassa (pen.)	0 (2)
Club Egara	0 (0)

==== Quarterfinals ====
11 December 2020
10:30

CD Terrassa	2–1	Real Club de Polo
Ycart 13'; Escaich 22'	Report	Maldonado 23'

Umpires:
Gema Calderón (ESP)
Nayra Rodríguez (ESP)

11 December 2020
12:45

Sanse Complutense	1–2	Júnior
Riera 20'	Report	Alonso 8'; Strappato 53'

Umpires:
Pilar López (ESP)
María Mercedes Romero (ESP)

11 December 2020
15:00

Club de Campo	3–0	Sardinero
Torres-Quevedo 32'; Abajo 45'; López 54'	Report

Umpires:
Sandra Adell (ESP)
Laura Trujillo (ESP)

11 December 2020
17:15

Club Egara	1–0	Sardinero
Ca. Salvatella 21'	Report

Umpires:
Noelia Blanco (ESP)
Ana Ortega (ESP)

=== First to fourth place classification ===
==== Semi-finals ====
12 December 2020
10:30

CD Terrassa	0–4	Júnior
	Report	Vidosa 2'; Bosch 4'; Gil 27'; Lima 64'

Umpires:
Laura Trujillo (ESP)
Ana Ortega (ESP)

12 December 2020
12:45

Club de Campo	1–0	Club Egara
Gil 23'	Report

Umpires:
María Mercedes Romero (ESP)
Gema Calderón (ESP)

==== Third and fourth place ====
12 December 2020
08:45

CD Terrassa	0–0	Club Egara
	Report
Penalties
Ycart (penalty shoot-out scored); Escaich (penalty shoot-out missed); Pons (penalty shoot-out missed); Villoro (penalty shoot-out missed); Forté (penalty shoot-out scored)	2–0	(penalty shoot-out missed) Willig; (penalty shoot-out missed) Fitó; (penalty shoot-out missed) Ca. Salvatella; (penalty shoot-out missed) Tost

Umpires:
Ana Ortega (ESP)
Noelia Blanco (ESP)

==== Final ====
12 December 2020
11:00

Júnior	2–1	Club de Campo
M. Serrahima 5', 42'	Report	García 21'

Umpires:
Pilar López (ESP)
Sandra Adell (ESP)

== Awards ==
Top Goalscorer	Player of the Tournament	Goalkeeper of the Tournament
Mariona Serrahima (JÚN)	Georgina Oliva (JÚN)	Mariona Girabent (CEG)
