= 2018–19 Liga Iberdrola Hockey =

Liga Iberdrola
- Season: 2018–2019
- Dates: 23 September 2018 – 1 June 2019
- Champions: Club de Campo (22nd title)
- Regular season: Club de Campo
- Relegated: Tenis
- Euro Hockey League: Club de Campo
- Matches played: 103
- Goals scored: 374 (3.63 per match)
- Top goalscorer: Begoña García; Marlies Verbruggen (16 goals)
- Biggest home win: Club de Campo 6–0 Tenis
- Biggest away win: Tenis 2–9 Club de Campo

The 2018–19 Liga Iberdrola was the 82nd season of the Liga Iberdrola, Spain's premier field hockey league for women. It began on 23 September 2018 and it concluded on 2 June 2019.

Real Sociedad were the defending champions.

== Teams ==
A total of 10 teams participated in the 2018–2019 edition of the Liga Iberdrola. The promoted team was Tenis, who replaced RC Jolaseta.

Team	Location	Province
Atlètic Terrassa	Terrassa	Barcelona
Club de Campo	Madrid	Madrid
Club Egara	Terrassa	Barcelona
Club de Polo	Barcelona	Barcelona
Júnior	Barcelona	Barcelona
Real Sociedad	San Sebastián	Gipuzkoa
Sanse Complutense	San Sebastián de los Reyes	Madrid
Taburiente	Las Palmas	Las Palmas
Tenis	Santander	Cantabria
CD Terrassa	Terrassa	Barcelona

== Results ==
=== Regular season ===
==== Table ====
Pos	Team	Pld	W	D	L	GF	GA	GD	Pts	Qualification
1	Club de Campo	18	15	3	0	79	20	+59	48	Quarterfinals
2	Club de Polo	18	12	4	2	42	19	+23	40	Quarterfinals
3	Júnior	18	10	5	3	32	17	+15	35	Quarterfinals
4	Taburiente	18	10	3	5	29	24	+5	33	Quarterfinals
5	Sanse Complutense	18	9	3	6	37	33	+4	30	Quarterfinals
6	Real Sociedad	18	4	5	9	21	40	−19	17	Quarterfinals
7	Club Egara	18	3	8	7	24	39	−15	17	Quarterfinals
8	CD Terrassa	18	2	7	9	24	38	−14	13	Quarterfinals
9	Atlètic Terrassa	18	2	4	12	26	45	−19	10	Relegation play–off
10	Tenis	18	1	2	15	17	56	−39	5	Relegated to 2019–20 Primera División

Source: Real Federación Española de Hockey
Rules for classification: 1) Points; 2) Goal difference; 3) Goals scored; 4) Games won; 5) Head-to-head.

==== Fixtures ====
Home \ Away	ATE	CDT	CDC	CEG	CDP	JÚN	RSO	SCO	UDT	TEN
Atlètic Terrassa	—	2–2	0–6	2–3	0–1	0–3	1–1	2–4	0–1	4–0
CD Terrassa	2–2	—	2–6	2–2	1–1	1–1	2–2	0–0	1–2	5–2
Club de Campo	6–2	3–0	—	6–1	2–2	4–1	4–1	3–1	6–2	6–0
Club Egara	1–1	1–0	2–2	—	0–5	1–1	1–2	3–3	0–1	2–1
Club de Polo	3–2	2–1	1–4	2–2	—	0–0	4–0	4–1	2–0	3–1
Júnior	3–1	5–0	1–1	3–1	2–1	—	2–0	1–2	0–1	2–0
Real Sociedad	3–1	1–0	1–6	2–2	0–2	0–1	—	1–1	0–4	4–2
Sanse Complutense	3–2	4–2	1–3	2–1	2–3	3–4	1–0	—	1–3	2–0
Taburiente	2–1	2–1	0–2	1–1	0–2	1–1	4–1	1–3	—	3–1
Tenis	1–3	0–2	2–9	3–0	1–4	0–1	2–2	0–3	1–1	—

Source: Real Federación Española de Hockey
Legend: Blue = home team win; Yellow = draw; Red = away team win.

=== Play–down ===
As the second placed team in the 2018–19 Primera División, CH Pozuelo played in a two-match relegation/promotion series against Atlètic Terrassa.

Team 1	Agg.	Team 2	1st leg	2nd leg
Atlètic Terrassa	2–0	CH Pozuelo	1–1 (3–2 pen.)	3–0

26 May 2019
12:30

Atlètic Terrassa	1–1	CH Pozuelo
Gesti 37'	Report	Puglisi 23'
Penalties
	3–2

Atlètic Terrassa, Terrassa
Umpires:
Nayra Rodríguez (ESP)
Pilar López (ESP)

1 June 2019
12:30

CH Pozuelo	0–3	Atlètic Terrassa
	Report	Mazars 33'; Gesti 50', 60'

CH Pozuelo, Madrid
Umpires:
Gema Calderón (ESP)
María Mercedes Romero (ESP)

=== Play–offs ===
Quarter-finals
11–12 May 2019
Club de Campo	7	5
CD Terrassa	1	1
11–12 May 2019
Taburiente	0	0
Sanse Complutense	2	2
11–12 May 2019
Júnior	2	5
Real Sociedad	2	1
11–12 May 2019
Club de Polo	1	1	(1)
Club Egara	2	0	(2)

Semi-finals
18 May 2019
Club de Campo	3
Sanse Complutense	0
18 May 2019
Júnior	1
Club Egara	0

Final
19 May 2019
Club de Campo (pen.)	1 (4)
Júnior	1 (3)

==== Quarter-finals ====
Team 1	Agg.	Team 2	1st leg	2nd leg
Club de Campo	2–0	CD Terrassa	7–1	5–1
Club de Polo	1–1 (1–2 pen.)	Club Egara	1–2	1–0
Júnior	1–0	Real Sociedad	2–2	5–1
Taburiente	0–2	Sanse Complutense	0–2	0–2

11 May 2019
13:00

Club de Campo	7–1	CD Terrassa
S. Barrios 7', 37', 69'; Be. Pérez 10'; Gil 18'; Abajo 31'; Cano 38'	Report	Bruguera 9'

Club de Campo, Madrid
Umpires:
Álvaro López (ESP)
Gema Calderón (ESP)

12 May 2019
12:30

Club de Campo	5–1	CD Terrassa
Ma. López 9', 60'; Abajo 17'; Am. Gil 42'; Bl. Pérez 53'	Report	Mó. López 29'

Club de Campo, Madrid
Umpires:
Gema Calderón (ESP)
Montse Solórzano (ESP)

Club de Campo won the series 2–0.

11 May 2019
12:45

Club de Polo	1–2	Club Egara
De Mir 50'	Report	López-Llauder 26'; Salvatella 60'

Club de Polo, Barcelona
Umpires:
Laura Trujillo (ESP)
Jordi Puig (ESP)

12 May 2019
11:00

Club de Polo	1–0	Club Egara
Zaldúa 19'	Report
Penalties
	1–2

Club de Polo, Barcelona
Umpires:
Pilar López (ESP)
Laura Trujillo (ESP)

Club Egara won the series 2–1 in penalties, after the series finished 1–1.

11 May 2019
13:00

Júnior	2–2	Real Sociedad
Petchamé 10'; Flores 42'	Report	N. Belzunegi 40'; Catalina 44'

Júnior FC, Barcelona
Umpires:
Daniel Rodríguez (ESP)
Dolors Trujillo (ESP)

12 May 2019
11:00

Júnior	5–1	Real Sociedad
Queralt 13'; Alonso 38'; An. Gil 39'; Serrahima 41'; San José 65'	Report	Maraña 70'

Júnior FC, Barcelona
Umpires:
Dolors Trujillo (ESP)
Benjamín Díaz (ESP)

Júnior won the series 1–0.

11 May 2019
12:30

Taburiente	0–2	Sanse Complutense
	Report	Bruni 14'; Rodríguez 42'

UD Taburiente, Las Palmas
Umpires:
Andrés J. Ortíz (ESP)
Ruben Rodríguez (ESP)

12 May 2019
12:00

Taburiente	0–2	Sanse Complutense
	Report	Lorenzo 5'; Jiménez 13'

UD Taburiente, Las Palmas
Umpires:
Ruben Rodríguez (ESP)
Andrés J. Ortíz (ESP)

Sanse Complutense won the series 2–0.

==== Semi-finals ====
18 May 2019
11:00

Club de Campo	3–0	Sanse Complutense
Cano 4'; L. Barrios 48'; García 56'	Report

Estadi Olímpic de Terrassa, Terrassa
Umpires:
Laura Trujillo (ESP)
Sandra Adell (ESP)

18 May 2019
13:00

Júnior	1–0	Club Egara
Petchamé 31'	Report

Estadi Olímpic de Terrassa, Terrassa
Umpires:
Pilar López (ESP)
Gema Calderón (ESP)

==== Final ====
19 May 2019
13:00

Club de Campo	1–0	Júnior
Cano 33'	Report	Flores 70'
Penalties
Gutiérrez (penalty shoot-out scored); García (penalty shoot-out scored); Be. Pérez (penalty shoot-out scored); López (penalty shoot-out missed); Cano (penalty shoot-out scored)	4–3	(penalty shoot-out missed) Queralt; (penalty shoot-out scored) Grau; (penalty shoot-out scored) Petchamé; (penalty shoot-out missed) Bosch; (penalty shoot-out scored) Serrahima

Estadi Olímpic de Terrassa, Terrassa
Umpires:
Pilar López (ESP)
María Mercedes Romero (ESP)

== Top goalscorers ==
Pos.	Player	Nationality	Team	Goals
1	Begoña García	Spain	Club de Campo	16
1	Marlies Verbruggen	Netherlands	Real Club de Polo	16
3	Carmen Cano	Spain	Club de Campo	15
3	María López	Spain	Club de Campo	15
5	Clara Ycart	Spain	CD Terrassa	14
6	Lola Riera	Spain	Sanse Complutense	12
7	María Gesti	Spain	Atlètic Terrassa	11
8	Lucía Abaja	Spain	Club de Campo	10
8	Laura Barrios	Spain	Club de Campo	10
10	Isabel Zaldúa	Spain	Real Club de Polo	9
