= 2019–20 Copa de la Reina de Hockey Hierba =

2019–20 Copa de la Reina
Tournament details
- Host country: Spain
- City: Madrid
- Dates: 20–22 December 2019
- Teams: 8
- Venue(s): Club de Campo

Final positions
- Champions: Club de Campo (17th title)
- Runner-up: Sanse Complutense
- Third place: UD Taburiente

Tournament statistics
- Matches played: 8
- Goals scored: 28 (3.5 per match)
- Top scorer(s): María López (5 goals)
- Best player: Alejandra Torres-Quevedo

The 2019–20 Copa de la Reina was the 35th edition of the Copa de la Reina, Spain's annual field hockey cup competition for women. It was held from 20 to 22 December 2020 in Madrid, at Club de Campo.

Club de Campo won the tournament for the 17th time, defeating Sanse Complutense 4–2 in the final. UD Taburiente finished in third place after defeating Atlètic Terrassa 1–0.

== Qualified teams ==
The tournament was contested by the top eight ranked teams from the first half of the 2019–20 season of the Liga Iberdrola.

- Atlètic Terrassa
- CD Terrassa
- Club de Campo
- Club Egara
- Júnior
- Real Club de Polo
- Sanse Complutense
- UD Taburiente

== Officials ==
The following umpires were appointed by the RFEH to officiate the tournament:

- Sandra Adell (ESP)
- Gema Calderón (ESP)
- Pilar López (ESP)
- María Mercedes Romero (ESP)
- Jorge Ocaña (ESP)
- Nayra Rodríguez (ESP)
- Montserrat Solórzano (ESP)
- Laura Trujillo (ESP)

== Results ==
=== Knockouts ===
Quarter-finals
20 December 2019
UD Taburiente	2
Júnior	0
20 December 2019
CD Terrassa	0
Sanse Complutense	4
20 December 2019
Atlètic Terrassa	0 (3)
Club Egara	0 (0)
20 December 2019
Real Club de Polo	2
Club de Campo	3

Semi-finals
21 December 2019
UD Taburiente	0
Sanse Complutense	4
21 December 2019
Atlètic Terrassa	0
Club de Campo	6

Final
22 December 2019
Sanse Complutense	2
Club de Campo	4
Third place
2 December 2019
UD Taburiente	1
Atlètic Terrassa	0

==== Quarterfinals ====
20 December 2019
10:30

UD Taburiente	2–0	Júnior
Guerra 52'; Antoniazzi 69'	Report

Umpires:
Pilar López (ESP)
Laura Trujillo (ESP)

20 December 2019
12:45

CD Terrassa	0–4	Sanse Complutense
	Report	Pampín 12'; Álvarez 30', 40'; Jiménez 59'

Umpires:
Montserrat Solórzano (ESP)
Jorge Ocaña (ESP)

20 December 2019
14:30

Atlètic Terrassa	0–0	Club Egara
	Report
Penalties
	3–0

Umpires:
Nayra Rodríguez (ESP)
María Mercedes Romero (ESP)

20 December 2019
16:30

Real Club de Polo	2–3	Club de Campo
Zaldúa 45'; Sofía 60'	Report	López 12', 54'; García 38'

Umpires:
Montserrat Solórzano (ESP)
Jorge Ocaña (ESP)

=== First to fourth place classification ===
==== Semi-finals ====
21 December 2019
10:30

UD Taburiente	0–4	Sanse Complutense
	Report	Riera 2', 25'; Pampín 22'; Álvarez 54'

Umpires:
María Mercedes Romero (ESP)
Laura Trujillo (ESP)

21 December 2019
12:30

Atlètic Terrassa	0–6	Club de Campo
	Report	L. Barrios 14', 63'; García 16'; López 39', 61'; Torres-Quevedo 53'

Umpires:
Pilar López (ESP)
Nayra Rodríguez (ESP)

==== Third and fourth place ====
22 December 2019
10:00

UD Taburiente	1–0	Atlètic Terrassa
Ortíz 20'	Report

Umpires:
Jorge Ocaña (ESP)
Montserrat Solórzano (ESP)

==== Final ====
22 December 2019
12:30

Sanse Complutense	2–4	Club de Campo
Álvarez 10'; Riera 34'	Report	García 5', 19'; L. Barrios 15'; López 22'

Umpires:
Sandra Adell (ESP)
Gema Calderón (ESP)

== Awards ==
Top Goalscorer	Player of the Tournament	Goalkeeper of the Tournament	Most Promising Player
María López (CDC)	Alejandra Torres-Quevedo (CDC)	María Ruíz (CDC)	Patricia Álvarez (SCO)
