= 2021 Women's Euro Hockey League =

Euro Hockey League Women, Europe's premier women's club field hockey tournament

2021 Euro Hockey League Women
Tournament details
- Host country: Netherlands
- City: Amstelveen
- Dates: 3–5 April
- Teams: 4 (from 3 associations)
- Venue: Wagener Stadium

Final positions
- Champions: (Netherlands) Den Bosch (1st title)
- Runner-up: (Spain) Club de Campo
- Third place: (Netherlands) Amsterdam

Tournament statistics
- Matches played: 4
- Goals scored: 15 (3.75 per match)
- Top scorer: (Netherlands) Frédérique Matla (4 goals)

The 2021 Euro Hockey League Women was the first edition of the Euro Hockey League Women, Europe's premier women's club field hockey tournament, organized by the European Hockey Federation.

It was held alongside the men's tournament behind closed doors at the Wagener Stadium in Amstelveen, Netherlands from 3 to 5 April 2021.

The tournament was originally scheduled to be held with eight teams from six countries. Due to the COVID-19 restrictions in the Netherlands the tournament was reduced to four teams with the four original seeded teams qualifying.

== Final4 ==
=== Bracket ===
Semi-finals
3 April
(Netherlands) Amsterdam	1 (3)
(Netherlands) Den Bosch (s.o.)	1 (4)
3 April
(Spain) Club de Campo (s.o.)	1 (4)
(Germany) Club an der Alster	1 (3)

Final
5 April
(Netherlands) Den Bosch	5
(Spain) Club de Campo	0
Third place
4 April
(Netherlands) Amsterdam	4
(Germany) Club an der Alster	2

=== Semi-finals ===
3 April 2021
11:30

Club de Campo (Spain)	1–1	(Germany) Club an der Alster
Cano 44'	Report	Wiedermann 59'
Penalties
García (penalty shoot-out scored); Cano (penalty shoot-out scored); Pérez (penalty shoot-out scored); López (penalty shoot-out scored); Magaz (penalty shoot-out missed)	4–3	(penalty shoot-out scored) Schröder; (penalty shoot-out scored) Altenburg; (penalty shoot-out scored) Gablać; (penalty shoot-out missed) Wiedermann; (penalty shoot-out missed) Huse

Umpires:
Ymkje van Slooten (NED)
Celine Martin-Schmets (BEL)

3 April 2021
14:00

Amsterdam (Netherlands)	1–1	(Netherlands) Den Bosch
Veen 34'	Report	Matla 59'
Penalties
Verschoor (penalty shoot-out missed); Albers (penalty shoot-out scored); Veen (penalty shoot-out scored); Kappelle (penalty shoot-out scored); Stam (penalty shoot-out missed)	3–4	(penalty shoot-out scored) Sanders; (penalty shoot-out scored) Matla; (penalty shoot-out scored) Welten; (penalty shoot-out scored) Koolen

Umpires:
Magali Sergeant (BEL)
Laurine Delforge (BEL)

=== Third and fourth place ===
4 April 2021
13:30

Amsterdam (Netherlands)	4–2	(Germany) Club an der Alster
Moes 9', 55'; Albers 28', 52'	Report	Valentin 11'; Gablać 42'

Umpires:
Magali Sergeant (BEL)
Celine Martin-Schmets (BEL)

=== Final ===
5 April 2021
16:00

Den Bosch (Netherlands)	5–0	(Spain) Club de Campo
Welten 18'; Matla 29', 40', 54'; Krekelaar 45'	Report

Umpires:
Ymkje van Slooten (NED)
Laurine Delforge (BEL)

== Statistics ==
=== Final standings ===
1. (Netherlands) Den Bosch
2. (Spain) Club de Campo
3. (Netherlands) Amsterdam
4. (Germany) Club an der Alster

=== Goalscorers ===
Rank	Player	Team	FG	PC	PS	Goals
1	(Netherlands) Frédérique Matla	(Netherlands) Den Bosch	2	2	0	4
2	(Netherlands) Felice Albers	(Netherlands) Amsterdam	2	0	0	2
2	(Netherlands) Freeke Moes	(Netherlands) Amsterdam	2	0	0	2
4	(Netherlands) Marijn Veen	(Netherlands) Amsterdam	1	0	0	1
4	(Netherlands) Maartje Krekelaar	(Netherlands) Den Bosch	1	0	0	1
4	(Netherlands) Lidewij Welten	(Netherlands) Den Bosch	1	0	0	1
4	(Germany) Hannah Gablać	(Germany) Club an der Alster	0	1	0	1
4	(Germany) Hanna Valentin	(Germany) Club an der Alster	0	1	0	1
4	(Germany) Felicia Wiedermann	(Germany) Club an der Alster	0	1	0	1
4	(Spain) Carmen Cano	(Spain) Club de Campo	0	1	0	1

== See also ==
- 2021 Euro Hockey League
- 2021 Women's EuroHockey Indoor Club Cup
