= 2017 Women's EuroHockey Club Trophy =

European field hockey tournament

Tournament details
- Host country: Germany
- City: Munich
- Dates: 2–5 June
- Teams: 8
- Venue: Münchner SportClub

Final positions
- Champions: (Germany) Münchner (1st title)
- Runner-up: (Spain) Club de Campo
- Third place: (Belarus) Minsk

Tournament statistics
- Matches played: 16
- Goals scored: 77 (4.81 per match)
- Top scorer: (Belarus) Volha Shyntar (7 goals)

The 2017 Women's EuroHockey Club Trophy was the 41st edition of the women's Women's EuroHockey Club Trophy, Europe's secondary club field hockey tournament organized by the EHF. It was held from 2 to 5 June 2017 in Munich, Germany.

Münchner won the tournament after defeating Club de Campo 1–0 in the final. Minsk finished third, after defeating Grodno 5–4 in the third place playoff.

== Teams ==
- (Belarus) Grodno
- (Belarus) Minsk
- (Germany) Münchner
- (Ireland) Pegasus
- (Italy) Amiscora
- (Scotland) Grove Menzieshill
- (Spain) Club de Campo
- (Ukraine) Sumchanka

== Results ==
=== Preliminary round ===
==== Pool A ====
Pos	Team	Pld	W	D	L	GF	GA	GD	Pts	Qualification
1	(Germany) Münchner (H)	3	3	0	0	11	0	+11	15	Final
2	(Belarus) Minsk	3	2	0	1	9	9	0	10	
3	(Ukraine) Sumchanka	3	1	0	2	2	6	−4	5	
4	(Italy) Amiscora	3	0	0	3	3	10	−7	0	

Source: EHF
(H) Hosts

2 June 2017
16:45

Sumchanka (Ukraine)	1–3	(Belarus) Minsk
Honcharenko 54'	Report	Sazhina 35', 36'; Tsabrova 58'

Umpires:
Alex Walker (SCO)
Maartje de Bruijn (NED)

2 June 2017
19:00

Münchner (Germany)	3–0	(Italy) Amiscora
Sandner 27'; Dorner 32'; Krüger 57'	Report

Umpires:
Ymkje van Slooten (NED)
Volha Kazak (BLR)

3 June 2017
14:30

Amiscora (Italy)	3–6	(Belarus) Minsk
Vynohradova 11'; Carta 21'; Dalla Vittoria 50'	Report	Raiskaya 7'; Tsabrova 22'; Sazhina 28', 45'; Yubko 42'; Filipovich 58'

Umpires:
Rebecca Woodcock (ENG)
Olena Klymenko (UKR)

3 June 2017
16:45

Sumchanka (Ukraine)	0–3	(Germany) Münchner
	Report	Strobel 19'; Brown 23'; Willig 38'

Umpires:
Ilaria Amorosini (ITA)
Alex Walker (SCO)

4 June 2017
14:30

Amiscora (Italy)	0–1	(Ukraine) Sumchanka
	Report	Kernoz 34'

Umpires:
Sviatlana Karzhevich (BLR)
Alex Walker (SCO)

4 June 2017
16:45

Münchner (Germany)	5–0	(Belarus) Minsk
Krüger 7'; Brown 9', 18', 37'; Hasselmann 44'	Report

Umpires:
Rebecca Woodcock (ENG)
Aisling Keogh (IRE)

==== Pool B ====
Pos	Team	Pld	W	D	L	GF	GA	GD	Pts	Qualification
1	(Spain) Club de Campo	3	3	0	0	15	2	+13	15	Final
2	(Belarus) Grodno	3	1	1	1	9	8	+1	7	
3	(Ireland) Pegasus	3	1	1	1	7	11	−4	7	
4	(Scotland) Grove Menzieshill	3	0	0	3	2	12	−10	0	

Source: EHF

2 June 2017
12:15

Grodno (Belarus)	3–0	(Scotland) Grove Menzieshill
Bahushevich 3', 8'; Shyntar 10'	Report

Umpires:
Rebecca Woodcock (ENG)
Olena Klymenko (UKR)

2 June 2017
14:30

Club de Campo (Spain)	5–0	(Ireland) Pegasus
López 21', 34', 60+'; Cano 45'; L. Barrios 58'	Report

Umpires:
Gabriele Schmitz (GER)
Ilaria Amorosini (ITA)

3 June 2017
10:00

Grove Menzieshill (Scotland)	2–3	(Ireland) Pegasus
McMullan 7'; Carroll 48'	Report	Speers 12', 12'; Grieve 25'

Umpires:
Gabriele Schmitz (GER)
Sviatlana Karzhevich (BLR)

3 June 2017
12:15

Club de Campo (Spain)	4–2	(Belarus) Grodno
S. Barrios 7'; Iglesias 36'; Pérez 44'; Cano 51'	Report	Shyntar 33'; Silitskaya 34'

Umpires:
Aisling Keogh (IRE)
Ymkje van Slooten (NED)

4 June 2017
10:00

Grodno (Belarus)	4–4	(Ireland) Pegasus
Shyntar 7', 28', 43'; Kurhanskaya 23'	Report	Speers 10', 44'; R. McMillan 22'; H. McMillan 38'

Umpires:
Maartje de Bruijn (NED)
Ilaria Amorosini (ITA)

4 June 2017
12:15

Grove Menzieshill (Scotland)	0–6	(Spain) Club de Campo
	Report	Magaz 6', 39'; Cano 8'; Figar Coghen 41'; Gil 52'; López 56'

Umpires:
Volha Kazak (BLR)
Gabriele Schmitz (GER)

=== Classification round ===
==== Seventh and eighth place ====
5 June 2017
08:30

Amiscora (Italy)	2–3	(Scotland) Grove Menzieshill
Carta 50'; Dalla Vittoria 58'	Report	McKie 4'; Hamilton 11'; Walls 42'

Umpires:
Aisling Keogh (IRE)
Olena Klymenko (UKR)

==== Fifth and sixth place ====
5 June 2017
10:45

Sumchanka (Ukraine)	2–2	(Ireland) Pegasus
Shevchenko 13'; Stetsenko 19'	Report	Doherty 10'; Speers 50'
Penalties
Stetsenko (penalty shoot-out scored); Kernoz (penalty shoot-out scored); Honcharenko (penalty shoot-out missed); Shokalenko (penalty shoot-out scored)	3–1	(penalty shoot-out scored) Doherty; (penalty shoot-out missed) Maguire; (penalty shoot-out missed) Harvey; (penalty shoot-out missed) Quinn

Umpires:
Rebecca Woodcock (ENG)
Maartje de Bruijn (NED)

==== Third and fourth place ====
5 June 2017
13:00

Minsk (Belarus)	5–4	(Belarus) Grodno
	Report

Umpires:
Gabriele Schmitz (GER)
Ilaria Amorosini (ITA)

==== Final ====
5 June 2017
15:15

Münchner (Germany)	1–0	(Spain) Club de Campo
Krüger 8'	Report

Umpires:
Alex Walker (SCO)
Ymkje van Slooten (NED)

== Statistics ==
=== Final standings ===
Pos	Team	Pld	W	D	L	GF	GA	GD	Pts	Final Result
1st place, gold medalist(s)	(Germany) Münchner (H)	4	4	0	0	12	0	+12	20	Gold Medal
2nd place, silver medalist(s)	(Spain) Club de Campo	4	3	0	1	15	3	+12	15	Silver Medal
3rd place, bronze medalist(s)	(Belarus) Minsk	4	3	0	1	14	13	+1	15	Bronze Medal
4	(Belarus) Grodno	4	1	1	2	13	13	0	7	Fourth Place
5	(Ukraine) Sumchanka	4	1	1	2	4	8	−4	7	Fifth place
6	(Ireland) Pegasus	4	1	2	1	9	13	−4	9	Sixth Place
7	(Scotland) Grove Menzieshill	4	1	0	3	5	14	−9	5	Seventh Place
8	(Italy) Amiscora	4	0	0	4	5	13	−8	0	Eighth Place

Source: EHF
(H) Hosts
