= Copa de la Reina (disambiguation) =

Copa de la Reina is the name of the national single-elimination women's sports competitions in Spain, in honour of Queen Letizia. They include:

- Copa de la Reina de Baloncesto, Spain's women's basketball cup
- Copa de la Reina de Balonmano, Spain's women's handball cup
- Copa de la Reina de Fútbol, Spain's women's football cup
- Copa de la Reina de Futsal, Spain's futsal cup
- Copa de la Reina de Rugby, Spain's rugby union cup
- Copa de la Reina de Hockey Patines, Spain's rink hockey cup
- Copa de la Reina de Hockey Hierba, Spain's field hockey cup
- Copa de la Reina de Waterpolo, Spain's water polo cup
