= Stella van Gils =

Dutch field hockey player

Personal information
- Full name: Stella Dianne van Gils
- Nationality: Dutch
- Born: 4 August 1999 (age 26)

Sport
- Sport: Field hockey
Medal record
European Championship
Gold medal – first place	2021 Amstelveen

Stella Dianne van Gils (born 4 August 1999) is a Dutch field hockey player who plays as a midfielder. She plays for club AHBC and is part of the Netherlands women's national field hockey team. She made her debut for the national team on 30 May 2021. She was part of the national team at the 2021 Women's EuroHockey Nations Championship.

She was included in the Netherlands squad for the women's field hockey tournament at the 2020 Summer Olympics, held in July and August 2021. Though designated as an alternate player, due to rule changes caused by the COVID-19 pandemic she was eligible to compete in all matches (unlike previous tournaments, in which alternates could only compete after permanently replacing an injured player). Though the Netherlands earned the gold medal, she did not make an appearance and was therefore ineligible to receive a medal.
