= Hannah Gablać =

German field hockey player

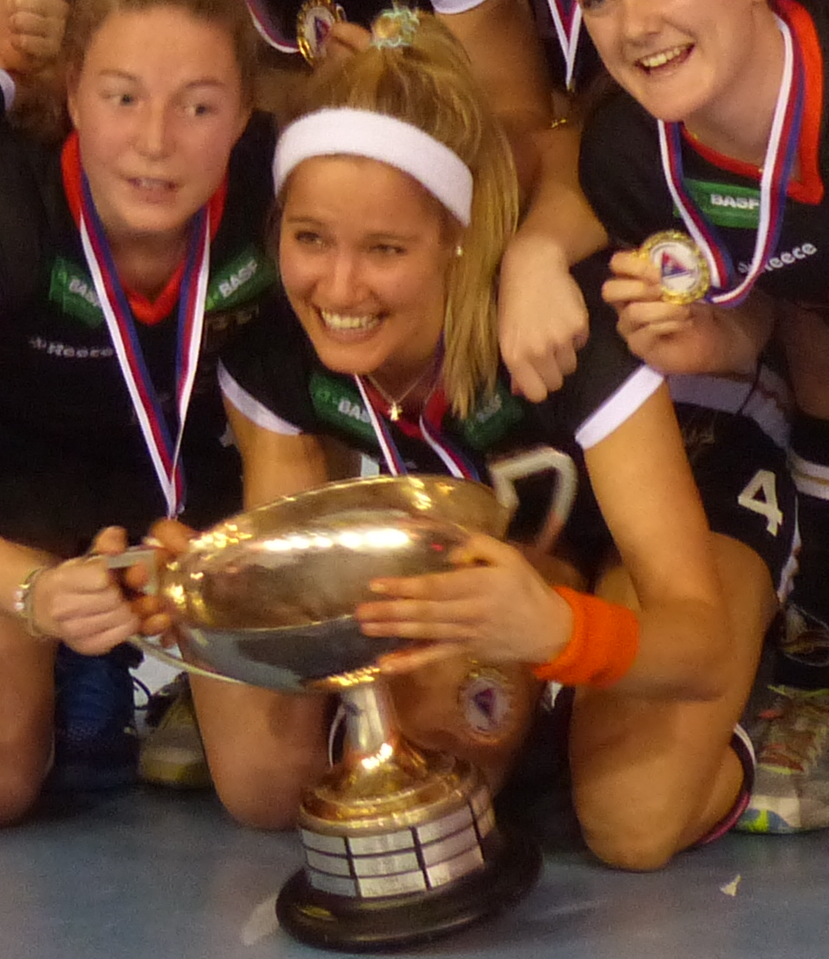
- The winning team 2018 Women's EuroHockey Indoor Nations Championship in Prague

Personal information
- Born: 25 February 1995 (age 31)

Sport
- Sport: Field hockey
- Position: Attacker
- Club: Der Club an der Alster
National team
Years	Team	Caps	Goals
2013–	Germany	60	(7)
Medal record
Women's field hockey
Representing Germany
EuroHockey Championships
Gold medal – first place	2013 Boom
Silver medal – second place	2019 Antwerp

Hannah Gablać (born 25 February 1995) is a German field hockey player.

== Career ==
=== National teams ===
Gablać debuted for the German national team in 2013, and played in 2013 EuroHockey Championships where the team won gold.

She was part of the Germany women's junior national team at the 2016 Hockey Junior World Cup in Chile. In 2018 she participated in the Hockey World Cup where the German team came fifth.

=== Club hockey ===
Gablać currently plays for Der Club an der Alster in the German Bundesliga. Previously she represented KTHC Rot-Weiß.
