= Maialen García =

Spanish field hockey player (born 1990)

Personal information
- Full name: Maialen García Galarraga
- Born: 5 April 1990 (age 36)

Sport
- Sport: Field hockey
- Club: Real Club Jolaseta
National team
Years	Team	Caps	Goals
–	Spain	80	-
Medal record
World Cup
Bronze medal – third place	2018 London

Maialen García Galarraga (born 5 April 1990) is a Spanish field hockey player for the Spanish national team.

She participated at the 2018 Women's Hockey World Cup.
