= Copa de la Reina de Hockey Hierba =

- Sport: Field hockey
- Founded: 1986; 40 years ago
- Administrator: Royal Spanish Hockey Federation
- No. of teams: 8
- Country: Spain
- Most recent champion: R.C. Polo (5th title) (2023)
- Most titles: Club de Campo (18 titles)
- Website: rfeh.es

The Copa de la Reina de Hockey Hierba is the national cup competition of women's field hockey in Spain. It was founded in 1986 and is managed and hosted by the Real Federación Española de Hockey.

== Champion by season ==
Year	Champion	Region
1986	CD Terrassa	(Catalonia)
1987	Real Sociedad	(Basque Country (autonomous community))
1988	Junior	(Catalonia)
1989	Club de Campo	(Community of Madrid)
1990	Atlético Madrid	(Community of Madrid)
1991	Club de Campo	(Community of Madrid)
1992	Club de Campo	(Community of Madrid)
1993	SPV'51	(Community of Madrid)
1994	Real Sociedad	(Basque Country (autonomous community))
1995	Club de Campo	(Community of Madrid)
1996	SPV'51	(Community of Madrid)
1997	SPV'51	(Community of Madrid)
1998	CD Terrassa	(Catalonia)
1999	Club de Campo	(Community of Madrid)
2000	CD Terrassa	(Catalonia)
2001	CD Terrassa	(Catalonia)
2002	Real Sociedad	(Basque Country (autonomous community))
2003	R.C. Polo	(Catalonia)

Year	Champion	Region
2004	R.C. Polo	(Catalonia)
2005	R.C. Polo	(Catalonia)
2006	Club de Campo	(Community of Madrid)
2007	CD Terrassa	(Catalonia)
2008	Club de Campo	(Community of Madrid)
2009	Club de Campo	(Community of Madrid)
2010	Club de Campo	(Community of Madrid)
2011	Club de Campo	(Community of Madrid)
2012	Club de Campo	(Community of Madrid)
2013	SPV'51	(Community of Madrid)
2014	Club de Campo	(Community of Madrid)
2015	R.C. Polo	(Catalonia)
2016	Club de Campo	(Community of Madrid)
2017	Club de Campo	(Community of Madrid)

Year	Host city	Gold Medal Match			Third and Fourth		
Year	Host city	Champions	Score	Runners-up	3rd place	Score	4th place
2017–18	Valencia	Club de Campo	3–0	Junior	Real Club de Polo	2–2 (2–1 pen.)	Club Egara
2018–19	Madrid	Club de Campo	5–2	Real Club de Polo	Taburiente	0–0 (3–2 pen.)	Junior
2019–20	Madrid	Club de Campo	4–2	SPV Complutense	Taburiente	1–0	Atlètic Terrassa
2020–21	Valencia	Junior	2–1	Club de Campo	CD Terrassa	0–0 (2–0 pen.)	Club Egara
2021–22	Barcelona	Club de Campo	4–2	Junior	Club Egara	1–0	Taburiente
2022–23	Madrid	Real Club de Polo	2–0	Club de Campo	Atlètic Terrassa HC	2–0	Real Sociedad

=== Titles by team ===
Team	Titles	Years won
Club de Campo	18	1989, 1991, 1992, 1995, 1999, 2006, 2008, 2009, 2010, 2011, 2012, 2014, 2016, 2017, 2018, 2019, 2020, 2022
CD Terrassa	5	1986, 1998, 2000, 2001, 2007
R.C. Polo	5	2003, 2004, 2005, 2015, 2023
SPV'51	4	1993, 1996, 1997, 2013
Real Sociedad	3	1987, 1994, 2002
Junior	2	1988, 2021
Atlético Madrid	1	1990

== See also ==
- Copa del Rey de Hockey Hierba
- División de Honor Femenina de Hockey Hierba
