= Sarah Haycroft =

English field hockey player

Sarah Evans
Personal information
- Born: 12 April 1991 (age 35) Wandsworth, England
- Height: 1.67 m (5 ft 6 in)
- Weight: 66 kg (146 lb)

Sport
- Sport: Field hockey
- Position: Midfielder
- Club: Surbiton
National team
Years	Team	Caps	Goals
2013–2021	England	73	(7)
2014–2021	Great Britain	49	(2)
–	ENGLAND & GB TOTAL:	122	(9)
Medal record
Women's field hockey
Representing Great Britain
Olympic Games
Bronze medal – third place	2020 Tokyo	Team
Representing England
Commonwealth Games
Bronze medal – third place	2018 Gold Coast	Team
European Championships
Bronze medal – third place	2017 Amsterdam
- Updated on 6 August 2021

Sarah Evans (born 12 April 1991) is an English field hockey player who plays as a midfielder for Surbiton and has represented the England and Great Britain national teams.

Evans was educated at Kingston Grammar School and University of Birmingham .

== Club career ==
She plays club hockey in the Women's England Hockey League Premier Division for Surbiton and she is the First Team Captain.

Evans also played for University of Birmingham from 2009 to 2012.

== International career ==
She made her senior international debut for England v South Africa in the 2013 Women's Hockey Investec Cup, on 4 February 2013. One year later she made her senior international debut for Great Britain v USA in a test match in San Diego, California, on 10 February 2014.

She was selected to play in the Gold Coast Commonwealth Games in 2018.

She was included in the Great Britain squad for the women's field hockey tournament at the 2020 Summer Olympics, held in July and August 2021. Though designated as an alternate player, due to rule changes caused by the COVID-19 pandemic she was eligible to compete in all matches (unlike previous tournaments, in which alternates could only compete after permanently replacing an injured player). Though Great Britain earned the bronze medal, she did not make an appearance and was therefore ineligible to receive a medal.
