= 2018 Women's Hockey World Cup =

Tournament details
- Host country: England
- City: London
- Dates: 21 July – 5 August
- Teams: 16
- Venue: Lee Valley Hockey and Tennis Centre

Final positions
- Champions: Netherlands (8th title)
- Runner-up: Ireland
- Third place: Spain

Tournament statistics
- Matches played: 36
- Goals scored: 126 (3.5 per match)
- Top scorer: (Netherlands) Kitty van Male (8 goals)
- Best player: (Netherlands) Lidewij Welten

Location of the World Cup venue on a map of Greater London

The 2018 Women's Hockey World Cup was the 14th edition of the Women's Hockey World Cup, a field hockey tournament. It was held from 21 July to 5 August 2018 at the Lee Valley Hockey and Tennis Centre in London, England.

Defending champions the Netherlands won the tournament for an eighth time after defeating Ireland 6–0 in the final, who claimed their first World Cup medal. Spain won the third place match by defeating Australia 3–1 to claim their first World Cup medal as well.

== Bidding ==
In March 2013, one month after the FIH published the Event Assignment Process Document for the 2014–2018 cycle, Australia, Belgium, England and New Zealand were shortlisted as candidates for hosting the event and were asked to submit bidding documentation, a requirement that eventually Belgium did not meet. In addition one month before the host election, Australia withdrew their application due to technical and financial reasons. England was announced as host on 7 November 2013 during a special ceremony in Lausanne, Switzerland.

== Venue ==
Also chosen to host the 2015 EuroHockey Nations Championship for men and women, the tournament was held at the Lee Valley Hockey and Tennis Centre within the Queen Elizabeth Olympic Park in London, England. This venue is part of the legacy from the 2012 Summer Olympics as the Riverbank Arena, where the field hockey events took place, which was scaled down and moved to its current location at Lee Valley Park.

== Qualification ==
Due to the increase to 16 participating teams, the new qualification process was announced in July 2015 by the International Hockey Federation. Each of the continental champions from five confederations and the host nation received an automatic berth. In addition, the 10/11 highest placed teams at the Semifinals of the 2016–17 FIH Hockey World League not already qualified entered the tournament. The following sixteen teams, shown with final pre-tournament rankings, competed in this tournament.

Dates	Event	Location	Qualifier(s)
7 November 2013	Host nation		England (2)
21 June–2 July 2017	2016–17 Hockey World League Semifinals	Brussels, Belgium	China (8); New Zealand (4); South Korea (9); Italy (17); Spain (11); Belgium (13)
8–23 July 2017	2016–17 Hockey World League Semifinals	Johannesburg, South Africa	United States (7); Germany (6); Japan (12); Ireland (16)
5–13 August 2017	2017 Pan American Cup	Lancaster, United States	Argentina (3)
19–27 August 2017	2017 EuroHockey Championship	Amsterdam, Netherlands	Netherlands (1)
11–15 October 2017	2017 Oceania Cup	Sydney, Australia	Australia (5)
22–29 October 2017	2017 Africa Cup of Nations	Ismailia, Egypt	South Africa (14)
28 October–5 November 2017	2017 Asia Cup	Kakamigahara, Japan	India (10)

== Format ==
The 16 teams were drawn into four groups, each containing four teams. Each team played each other team in its group once. The first-placed team in each group advanced to the quarterfinals, while the second- and third-placed teams in each group go into the crossover matches. From there on a single-elimination tournament was played.

== Umpires ==
15 umpires were appointed by the FIH for this tournament.

- Amber Church (NZL)
- Laurine Delforge (BEL)
- Carolina De La Fuente (ARG)
- Maggie Giddens (USA)
- Kelly Hudson (NZL)
- Michelle Joubert (RSA)
- Alison Keogh (IRL)
- Liu Xiaoying (CHN)
- Ayanna McClean (TTO)
- Michelle Meister (GER)
- Aleisha Neumann (AUS)
- Irene Presenqui (ARG)
- Annelize Rostron (RSA)
- Sarah Wilson (SCO)
- Emi Yamada (JPN)

== Results ==
The schedule was published on 26 November 2017.

All times are British Summer Time (UTC+1).

=== First round ===
==== Pool A ====
Pos	Team	Pld	W	D	L	GF	GA	GD	Pts	Qualification
1	Netherlands	3	3	0	0	26	2	+24	9	Quarterfinals
2	Italy	3	2	0	1	5	12	−7	6	Crossover
3	South Korea	3	0	1	2	1	9	−8	1	Crossover
4	China	3	0	1	2	2	11	−9	1	Eliminated

Source: FIH
Rules for classification: 1) points; 2) goal difference; 3) goals scored; 4) head-to-head result.

22 July 2018
11:00

China	0–3	Italy
	Report	Braconi 17'; Oviedo 32'; Ruggieri 45'

Umpires:
Laurine Delforge (BEL)
Ayanna McClean (TTO)

22 July 2018
17:00

Netherlands	7–0	South Korea
Matla 1', 11'; Welten 4'; Van Male 9', 23'; Jonker 14'; Leurink 17'	Report

Umpires:
Irene Presenqui (ARG)
Maggie Giddens (USA)

27 July 2018
18:00

China	1–7	Netherlands
Yong 57'	Report	Van Maasakker 7'; Jonker 15'; Leurink 24'; Welten 30', 37'; Van Male 56'; De Waard 59'

Umpires:
Ayanna McClean (TTO)
Emi Yamada (JPN)

27 July 2018
20:00

South Korea	0–1	Italy
	Report	Braconi 60'

Umpires:
Alison Keogh (IRL)
Maggie Giddens (USA)

29 July 2018
11:00

South Korea	1–1	China
Kim O. 15'	Report	Zhang 4'

Umpires:
Ayanna McClean (TTO)
Amber Church (NZL)

29 July 2018
13:00

Netherlands	12–1	Italy
Matla 10', 44'; Van Maasakker 14'; Jonker 22', 51'; Van Geffen 26'; Van Male 28', 41', 48', 60'; Dirkse van den Heuvel 31', 45'	Report	Tiddi 17'

Umpires:
Maggie Giddens (USA)
Emi Yamada (JPN)

==== Pool B ====
Pos	Team	Pld	W	D	L	GF	GA	GD	Pts	Qualification
1	Ireland	3	2	0	1	4	2	+2	6	Quarterfinals
2	England (H)	3	1	2	0	3	2	+1	5	Crossover
3	India	3	0	2	1	2	3	−1	2	Crossover
4	United States	3	0	2	1	3	5	−2	2	Eliminated

Source: FIH
Rules for classification: 1) points; 2) goal difference; 3) goals scored; 4) head-to-head result.
(H) Hosts

21 July 2018
14:00

England	1–1	India
Owsley 54'	Report	Goyal 25'

Umpires:
Aleisha Neumann (AUS)
Emi Yamada (JPN)

21 July 2018
18:00

United States	1–3	Ireland
Paolino 15'	Report	Duke 5', 41'; McCay 12'

Umpires:
Kelly Hudson (NZL)
Michelle Meister (GER)

25 July 2018
20:00

United States	1–1	England
Matson 39'	Report	Danson 34'

Umpires:
Annelize Rostron (RSA)
Laurine Delforge (BEL)

26 July 2018
14:00

India	0–1	Ireland
	Report	A. O'Flanagan 13'

Umpires:
Sarah Wilson (SCO)
Carolina De La Fuente (ARG)

29 July 2018
17:00

India	1–1	United States
Rani 31'	Report	Paolino 11'

Umpires:
Kelly Hudson (NZL)
Sarah Wilson (SCO)

29 July 2018
19:00

England	1–0	Ireland
Ansley 53'	Report

Umpires:
Irene Presenqui (ARG)
Laurine Delforge (BEL)

==== Pool C ====
Pos	Team	Pld	W	D	L	GF	GA	GD	Pts	Qualification
1	Germany	3	3	0	0	9	4	+5	9	Quarterfinals
2	Argentina	3	1	1	1	9	6	+3	4	Crossover
3	Spain	3	1	0	2	10	10	0	3	Crossover
4	South Africa	3	0	1	2	3	11	−8	1	Eliminated

Source: FIH
Rules for classification: 1) points; 2) goal difference; 3) goals scored; 4) head-to-head result.

21 July 2018
12:00

Germany	3–1	South Africa
Huse 14', 54'; Stapenhorst 32'	Report	Deetlefs 40'

Umpires:
Amber Church (NZL)
Ayanna McClean (TTO)

22 July 2018
13:00

Argentina	6–2	Spain
Jankunas 8'; Ortiz 15', 28'; Albertario 22'; Merino 31'; Barrionuevo 48'	Report	Salvatella 3'; Pérez 49'

Umpires:
Sarah Wilson (SCO)
Liu Xiaoying (CHN)

25 July 2018
18:00

Germany	3–2	Argentina
Gablać 6'; Stapenhorst 20', 25'	Report	F. Habif 15'; Ortiz 30'

Umpires:
Michelle Joubert (RSA)
Kelly Hudson (NZL)

26 July 2018
12:00

Spain	7–1	South Africa
Riera 2', 48'; Bonastre 11', 55'; Petchamé 37', 42'; Salvatella 45'	Report	Botes 35'

Umpires:
Aleisha Neumann (AUS)
Liu Xiaoying (CHN)

28 July 2018
12:00

Spain	1–3	Germany
López 30'	Report	Schröder 5'; Oruz 37'; Huse 40'

Umpires:
Aleisha Neumann (AUS)
Annelize Rostron (RSA)

28 July 2018
14:00

Argentina	1–1	South Africa
Granatto 46'	Report	Mayne 30'

Umpires:
Emi Yamada (JPN)
Alison Keogh (IRL)

==== Pool D ====
Pos	Team	Pld	W	D	L	GF	GA	GD	Pts	Qualification
1	Australia	3	1	2	0	4	3	+1	5	Quarterfinals
2	Belgium	3	1	1	1	8	7	+1	4	Crossover
3	New Zealand	3	1	1	1	6	5	+1	4	Crossover
4	Japan	3	1	0	2	7	10	−3	3	Eliminated

Source: FIH
Rules for classification: 1) points; 2) goal difference; 3) goals scored; 4) head-to-head result.

21 July 2018
20:00

Australia	3–2	Japan
Malone 17'; Hurtz 22'; Kenny 35'	Report	Kawamura 36'; Kato 60'

Umpires:
Annelize Rostron (RSA)
Alison Keogh (IRL)

22 July 2018
19:00

New Zealand	4–2	Belgium
Smith 24'; Gloyn 32'; Merry 32', 54'	Report	Versavel 28'; Boon 30'

Umpires:
Michelle Joubert (RSA)
Carolina De La Fuente (ARG)

24 July 2018
12:30

Japan	2–1	New Zealand
Oikawa 35'; Shimizu 48'	Report	McLaren 52'

Umpires:
Michelle Meister (GER)
Irene Presenqui (ARG)

24 July 2018
14:30

Australia	0–0	Belgium
	Report

Umpires:
Amber Church (NZL)
Alison Keogh (IRL)

28 July 2018
18:00

Japan	3–6	Belgium
Kato 36'; Mano 50'; Nagai 50'	Report	Vandermeiren 7'; Boon 17'; Weyns 22'; Versavel 33', 39', 47'

Umpires:
Michelle Meister (GER)
Michelle Joubert (RSA)

28 July 2018
20:00

New Zealand	1–1	Australia
Merry 13'	Report	Smith 18'

Umpires:
Liu Xiaoying (CHN)
Carolina De La Fuente (ARG)

=== Second round ===
Cross-overs
31 July
England	2
South Korea	0
30 July
Argentina	2
New Zealand	0
31 July
Italy	0
India	3
30 July
Belgium	0 (2)
Spain (p.s.o.)	0 (3)

Quarter-finals
2 August
Netherlands	2
England	0
1 August
Australia (p.s.o.)	0 (4)
Argentina	0 (3)
2 August
Ireland (p.s.o.)	0 (3)
India	0 (1)
1 August
Germany	0
Spain	1

Semi-finals
4 August
Netherlands (p.s.o.)	1 (3)
Australia	1 (1)
4 August
Ireland (p.s.o.)	1 (3)
Spain	1 (2)

Final
5 August
Netherlands	6
Ireland	0
Third place
5 August
Australia	1
Spain	3

==== Crossover ====
30 July 2018
18:00

Belgium	0–0	Spain
	Report
Penalties
Boon (penalty shoot-out missed); Versavel (penalty shoot-out scored); Vanden Borre (penalty shoot-out missed); Raes (penalty shoot-out missed); Leclef (penalty shoot-out scored); Versavel (penalty shoot-out missed)	2–3	(penalty shoot-out missed) García Grau; (penalty shoot-out scored) Pérez; (penalty shoot-out missed) Magaz; (penalty shoot-out scored) Bonastre; (penalty shoot-out missed) Riera; (penalty shoot-out scored) Pérez

Umpires:
Michelle Joubert (RSA)
Maggie Giddens (USA)

30 July 2018
20:15

Argentina	2–0	New Zealand
Barrionuevo 25'; Merino 49'	Report

Umpires:
Aleisha Neumann (AUS)
Annelize Rostron (RSA)

31 July 2018
18:00

Italy	0–3	India
	Report	Lalremsiami 9'; Goyal 45'; Katariya 55'

Umpires:
Kelly Hudson (NZL)
Emi Yamada (JPN)

31 July 2018
20:15

England	2–0	South Korea
Bray 9'; Owsley 59'	Report

Umpires:
Amber Church (NZL)
Liu Xiaoying (CHN)

==== Quarterfinals ====
1 August 2018
18:00

Germany	0–1	Spain
	Report	Cano 54'

Umpires:
Amber Church (NZL)
Liu Xiaoying (CHN)

1 August 2018
20:15

Australia	0–0	Argentina
	Report
Penalties
Peris (penalty shoot-out missed); Bates (penalty shoot-out scored); Fitzpatrick (penalty shoot-out missed); Malone (penalty shoot-out scored); McMahon (penalty shoot-out scored); Bates (penalty shoot-out missed); Peris (penalty shoot-out scored)	4–3	(penalty shoot-out missed) Merino; (penalty shoot-out scored) Von der Heyde; (penalty shoot-out scored) Albertario; (penalty shoot-out scored) Gomes Fantasia; (penalty shoot-out missed) Fernández Ladra; (penalty shoot-out missed) Albertario; (penalty shoot-out missed) Merino

Umpires:
Sarah Wilson (SCO)
Laurine Delforge (BEL)

2 August 2018
18:00

Ireland	0–0	India
	Report
Penalties
Daly (penalty shoot-out missed); A. O'Flanagan (penalty shoot-out missed); Upton (penalty shoot-out scored); Meeke (penalty shoot-out scored); Watkins (penalty shoot-out scored)	3–1	(penalty shoot-out missed) Rani; (penalty shoot-out missed) Monika; (penalty shoot-out missed) Navjot Kaur; (penalty shoot-out scored) Khokhar

Umpires:
Irene Presenqui (ARG)
Carolina De La Fuente (ARG)

2 August 2018
20:15

Netherlands	2–0	England
Welten 14'; Leurink 31'	Report

Umpires:
Michelle Meister (GER)
Michelle Joubert (RSA)

==== Semifinals ====
4 August 2018
14:00

Ireland	1–1	Spain
A. O'Flanagan 3'	Report	Magaz 39'
Penalties
Pinder (penalty shoot-out scored); A. O'Flanagan (penalty shoot-out missed); Upton (penalty shoot-out missed); Meeke (penalty shoot-out missed); Watkins (penalty shoot-out scored); Pinder (penalty shoot-out scored)	3–2	(penalty shoot-out missed) García; (penalty shoot-out missed) Pérez; (penalty shoot-out scored) Oliva; (penalty shoot-out missed) Petchamé; (penalty shoot-out scored) Riera; (penalty shoot-out missed) Oliva

Umpires:
Kelly Hudson (NZL)
Michelle Meister (GER)

4 August 2018
16:30

Netherlands	1–1	Australia
Jonker 22'	Report	Morgan 54'
Penalties
Matla (penalty shoot-out scored); Dirkse van den Heuvel (penalty shoot-out missed); Van Geffen (penalty shoot-out missed); De Waard (penalty shoot-out scored); Welten (penalty shoot-out scored)	3–1	(penalty shoot-out scored) Bates; (penalty shoot-out missed) Peris; (penalty shoot-out missed) Nobbs; (penalty shoot-out missed) McMahon

Umpires:
Carolina De La Fuente (ARG)
Sarah Wilson (SCO)

==== Third place game ====
5 August 2018
14:00

Australia	1–3	Spain
Slattery 40'	Report	López 11'; Bonastre 14'; Magaz 51'

Umpires:
Amber Church (NZL)
Annelize Rostron (RSA)

==== Final ====
5 August 2018
16:30

Netherlands	6–0	Ireland
Welten 7'; Jonker 19'; Van Male 28'; Pheninckx 30'; Keetels 32'; Van Maasakker 34'	Report

Umpires:
Carolina De La Fuente (ARG)
Laurine Delforge (BEL)

== Final ranking ==
Pos	Grp	Team	Pld	W	D	L	GF	GA	GD	Pts	Final result
1st place, gold medalist(s)	A	Netherlands	6	5	1	0	35	3	+32	16	Gold medal
2nd place, silver medalist(s)	B	Ireland	6	2	2	2	5	9	−4	8	Silver medal
3rd place, bronze medalist(s)	C	Spain	7	3	2	2	15	12	+3	11	Bronze medal
4	D	Australia	6	1	4	1	6	7	−1	7	Fourth place
5	C	Germany	4	3	0	1	9	5	+4	9	Eliminated in quarterfinals
6	B	England (H)	5	2	2	1	5	4	+1	8	Eliminated in quarterfinals
7	C	Argentina	5	2	2	1	11	6	+5	8	Eliminated in quarterfinals
8	B	India	5	1	3	1	5	3	+2	6	Eliminated in quarterfinals
9	A	Italy	4	2	0	2	5	15	−10	6	Eliminated in crossover matches
10	D	Belgium	4	1	2	1	8	7	+1	5	Eliminated in crossover matches
11	D	New Zealand	4	1	1	2	6	7	−1	4	Eliminated in crossover matches
12	A	South Korea	4	0	1	3	1	11	−10	1	Eliminated in crossover matches
13	D	Japan	3	1	0	2	7	10	−3	3	Eliminated in group stage
14	B	United States	3	0	2	1	3	5	−2	2	Eliminated in group stage
15	C	South Africa	3	0	1	2	3	11	−8	1	Eliminated in group stage
16	A	China	3	0	1	2	2	11	−9	1	Eliminated in group stage

Source: FIH.com
(H) Hosts

== Goalscorers ==
There were 126 goals scored in 36 matches, for an average of 3.5 goals per match.

8 goals

- (Netherlands) Kitty van Male

6 goals

- (Netherlands) Kelly Jonker

5 goals

- (Netherlands) Lidewij Welten

4 goals

- (Belgium) Louise Versavel
- (Netherlands) Frédérique Matla

3 goals

- (Argentina) Paula Ortiz
- (Germany) Viktoria Huse
- (Germany) Charlotte Stapenhorst
- (Netherlands) Laurien Leurink
- (Netherlands) Caia van Maasakker
- (New Zealand) Olivia Merry
- (Spain) Berta Bonastre

2 goals

- (Argentina) Noel Barrionuevo
- (Argentina) Delfina Merino
- (Belgium) Jill Boon
- (England) Lily Owsley
- (India) Neha Goyal
- (Ireland) Deirdre Duke
- (Ireland) Anna O'Flanagan
- (Italy) Valentina Braconi
- (Japan) Akiko Kato
- (Netherlands) Carlien Dirkse van den Heuvel
- (Spain) María López
- (Spain) Alicia Magaz
- (Spain) Carlota Petchamé
- (Spain) Lola Riera
- (Spain) Carola Salvatella
- (United States) Margaux Paolino

1 goal

- (Argentina) Agustina Albertario
- (Argentina) María José Granatto
- (Argentina) Florencia Habif
- (Argentina) Julieta Jankunas
- (Australia) Emily Hurtz
- (Australia) Jodie Kenny
- (Australia) Ambrosia Malone
- (Australia) Georgina Morgan
- (Australia) Kathryn Slattery
- (Australia) Emily Smith
- (Belgium) Judith Vandermeiren
- (Belgium) Anne-Sophie Weyns
- (China) Yong Jing
- (China) Zhang Xiaoxue
- (England) Giselle Ansley
- (England) Sophie Bray
- (England) Alex Danson
- (Germany) Hannah Gablać
- (Germany) Selin Oruz
- (Germany) Anne Schröder
- (India) Vandana Katariya
- (India) Lalremsiami
- (India) Rani Rampal
- (Ireland) Shirley McCay
- (Italy) Lara Oviedo
- (Italy) Giuliana Ruggieri
- (Italy) Chiara Tiddi
- (Japan) Motomi Kawamura
- (Japan) Yukari Mano
- (Japan) Hazuki Nagai
- (Japan) Shihori Oikawa
- (Japan) Minami Shimizu
- (Netherlands) Margot van Geffen
- (Netherlands) Marloes Keetels
- (Netherlands) Malou Pheninckx
- (Netherlands) Xan de Waard
- (New Zealand) Shiloh Gloyn
- (New Zealand) Anita McLaren
- (New Zealand) Kelsey Smith
- (South Africa) Kara-Lee Botes
- (South Africa) Lisa-Marie Deetlefs
- (South Africa) Jade Mayne
- (South Korea) Kim Ok-ju
- (Spain) Carmen Cano
- (Spain) Beatriz Pérez
- (United States) Erin Matson

Source: FIH

== Awards ==
Player of the Tournament	Top Goalscorer	Goalkeeper of the Tournament	Young Player of the Tournament
(Netherlands) Lidewij Welten	(Netherlands) Kitty van Male	(Ireland) Ayeisha McFerran	(Argentina) Lucina von der Heyde
