= Zara Malseed =

Northern Irish field hockey player

Personal information
- Nationality: Irish
- Born: 11 June 1997 (age 29)

Sport
- Sport: Field hockey
- College team: University of Edinburgh
- Club: Ards Ladies Hockey Club

Zara Malseed (born 11 June 1997) is an Irish field hockey player. She competed in the 2020 Summer Olympics.

== Early years, family and education ==
Zara grew up in Holywood, County Down, Northern Ireland where she attended Sullivan Upper School. She then went on to study engineering at the University of Edinburgh, and Medicine at Queens University of Belfast.

== Club Hockey ==
Zara competed for The University of Edinburgh where she attained a First Class honours in Chemical Engineering.

She now competes for Ards Ladies Hockey Club in County Down.
