= Julia Pons =

Spanish field hockey player (born 1994)

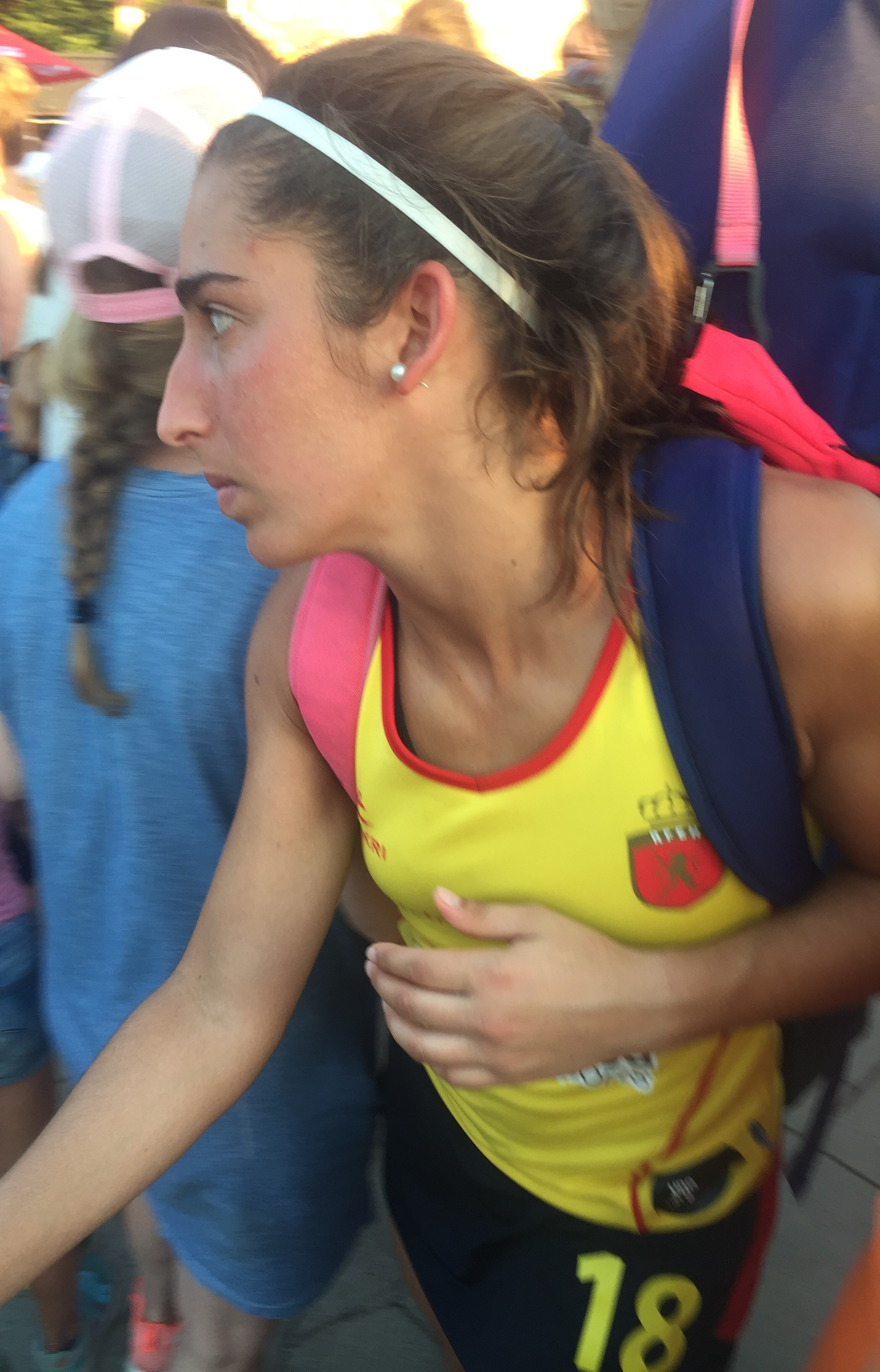
- Julia Pons

Personal information
- Full name: Julia Pons Genescà
- Born: 27 July 1994 (age 32)
- Height: 1.65 m (5 ft 5 in)
- Weight: 61 kg (134 lb)

Sport
- Sport: Field hockey
- Club: CD Terrassa
National team
Years	Team	Caps	Goals
–	Spain	131	-
Medal record
World Cup
Bronze medal – third place	2018 London
European Championship
Bronze medal – third place	2019 Antwerp

Julia Pons Genescà (born 27 July 1994) is a Spanish field hockey player for the Spanish national team.

She participated at the 2018 Women's Hockey World Cup.
