= Carola Salvatella =

Spanish field hockey player (born 1994)

Personal information
- Full name: Carola Salvatella Panés
- Born: 8 July 1994 (age 32)
- Height: 1.71 m (5 ft 7 in)
- Weight: 58 kg (128 lb)

Sport
- Sport: Field hockey
- Position: Forward
- Club: Club Egara
Senior career
Years	Team	Caps	Goals
–	Club Egara	-	-
National team
Years	Team	Caps	Goals
–	Spain	109	-
Medal record
World Cup
Bronze medal – third place	2018 London

Carola Salvatella Panés (born 8 July 1994) is a Spanish field hockey forward who is part of the Spain women's national field hockey team.

She was part of the Spanish team at the 2016 Summer Olympics in Rio de Janeiro, where they finished eighth. On club level she plays for Club Egara in Spain.
