= María Ruiz (field hockey) =

Spanish field hockey player (born 1990)

Personal information
- Born: 18 March 1990 (age 36)
- Height: 1.69 m (5 ft 7 in)
- Weight: 73 kg (161 lb)

Sport
- Sport: Field hockey
- Position: Goalkeeper
- Club: Club de Campo
National team
Years	Team	Caps	Goals
–	Spain	118	(0)
Medal record
World Cup
Bronze medal – third place	2018 London
European Championship
Bronze medal – third place	2019 Antwerp

María Angeles Ruiz Castillo (born 18 March 1990) is a Spanish field hockey player for the Spanish national team.

She participated at the 2018 Women's Hockey World Cup.

Individual award : Goalkeeper of the Tournament in 2019 Women's EuroHockey Nations Championship
