= Selin Oruz =

German field hockey player

Personal information
- Born: 5 February 1997 (age 29) Krefeld, Germany
- Height: 1.72 m (5 ft 8 in)
- Weight: 60 kg (132 lb)

Sport
- Sport: Field hockey
- Position: Defender
- Club: Düsseldorfer HC
National team
Years	Team	Caps	Goals
2013–	Germany	104	(2)
Medal record
Olympic Games
Bronze medal – third place	2016 Rio de Janeiro	Team
EuroHockey Championship
Silver medal – second place	2019 Antwerp
Silver medal – second place	2021 Armsterdam
Silver medal – second place	2025 Mönchengladbach
Bronze medal – third place	2023 Mönchengladbach
2019 Women's FIH Pro League
Bronze medal – third place	2019 Women's FIH Pro League

Selin Oruz (born 5 February 1997) is a German field hockey player. She represented her country at the 2016, 2020 and 2024 Summer Olympics.

Her brother Timur Oruz is also a hockey player who plays for the German national team.
