= Georgina Oliva =

Spanish field hockey player (born 1990)

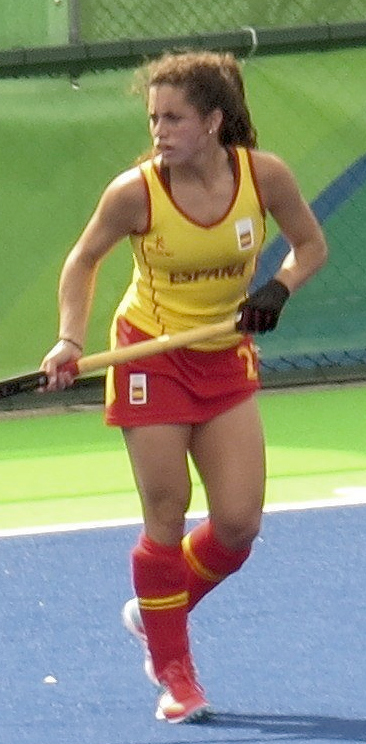
- Oliva at the 2016 Olympics

Personal information
- Full name: Georgina Oliva Isern
- Born: 18 July 1990 (age 36)
- Height: 1.60 m (5 ft 3 in)
- Weight: 53 kg (117 lb)

Sport
- Sport: Field hockey
- Position: Midfielder
- Club: Kampong
National team
Years	Team	Caps	Goals
–	Spain	199	-
Medal record
Women's field hockey
Representing Spain
World Cup
Bronze medal – third place	2018 London
European Championship
Bronze medal – third place	2019 Antwerp

Georgina Oliva Isern (born 18 July 1990) is a Spanish field hockey midfielder who competed at the 2008 and 2016 Summer Olympics. She was included to the national team in 2006, and in 2015 named Best Player at the Valencia semifinal of the 2014/15 World League and Best Player in the Spanish Division de Honor. Individual award : Player of the Tournament in 2019 Women's EuroHockey Nations Championship ....
