= Alicia Magaz =

Spanish field hockey player (born 1994)

Personal information
- Full name: Alicia Magaz Medrano
- Born: 24 May 1994 (age 32)
- Height: 1.61 m (5 ft 3 in)
- Weight: 60 kg (132 lb)

Sport
- Sport: Field hockey
- Position: Forward
- Club: Mannheimer HC
Senior career
Years	Team	Caps	Goals
–2018	Club de Campo	-	-
2018–	Mannheimer HC	-	-
National team
Years	Team	Caps	Goals
–	Spain	92	-
Medal record
World Cup
Bronze medal – third place	2018 London

Alicia Magaz Medrano (born 24 May 1994) is a Spanish field hockey forward who is part of the Spain women's national field hockey team.

She was part of the Spanish team at the 2016 Summer Olympics in Rio de Janeiro, where they finished eighth. On club level she plays for Club de Campo in Spain
