= Carlota Petchamé =

Spanish field hockey player

Personal information
- Full name: Carlota Petchamé Bonastre
- Born: 25 June 1990 (age 36)
- Height: 1.60 m (5 ft 3 in)
- Weight: 53 kg (117 lb)

Sport
- Sport: Field hockey
- Position: Forward
- Club: Júnior Fútbol Club
Senior career
Years	Team	Caps	Goals
–	Júnior Fútbol Club	-	-
National team
Years	Team	Caps	Goals
–	Spain	160	-
Medal record
World Cup
Bronze medal – third place	2018 London
European Championship
Bronze medal – third place	2019 Antwerp

Carlota Petchamé Bonastre (born 25 June 1990) is a Spanish field hockey forward who is a part of the Spain women's national field hockey team.

She was part of the Spanish team at the 2016 Summer Olympics in Rio de Janeiro, where they finished eighth. On club level, she plays for Júnior Fútbol Club in Spain.
