= Alejandra Torres-Quevedo =

Spanish field hockey player (born 1999)

Personal information
- Full name: Alejandra Torres-Quevedo Oliver
- Born: 30 September 1999 (age 27) Madrid, Spain

Sport
- Sport: Field hockey
- Position: Midfield
National team
Years	Team	Caps	Goals
2016	Spain U–18	5	(1)
2016–	Spain U–21	13	(0)
2017–	Spain	39	(3)
Medal record
Women's field hockey
Representing Spain
EuroHockey Nations Championship
Bronze medal – third place	2019 Antwerp	Team
FIH Hockey Series
Gold medal – first place	2018–19 Valencia	Team

Alejandra Torres-Quevedo Oliver (Note: In this Spanish name, the first or paternal surname is Torres-Quevedo and the second or maternal family name is Oliver.) (born 30 September 1999) is a field hockey player from Spain, who plays as a midfielder.

== Career ==
=== Club hockey ===
Alejandra Torres-Quevedo plays hockey for Club de Campo in the División de Honor in Spain.

=== National teams ===
==== Under–21 ====
In 2016, Torres-Quevedo was a member of the Spanish Under–21 team at the FIH Junior World Cup in Santiago.

She followed this up with an appearance at the 2017 EuroHockey Junior Championship in Valencia, where the team finished fifth.

==== Red Sticks ====
Torres-Quevedo made her debut for the Spanish national team, the 'Red Sticks', in 2017.

2019 was Torres-Quevedo's most prominent year with the national side, winning her first medal with the team at the FIH Series Finals in Valencia, taking home gold. This was followed up with a bronze medal performance at the EuroHockey Championships in Antwerp.
