= Club de Campo Villa de Madrid =

Sports venue in Madrid, Spain

- Interactive map of Club de Campo Villa de Madrid

Club information
- Location: Madrid, Spain
- Established: 1929; 97 years ago
- Tournaments: Open de España; Madrid Masters; Open de Madrid
- Website: www.clubvillademadrid.com

Negro (Black) Course
- Designed by: Javier de Arana
- Par: 71
- Length: 6,374 metres

Amarillo (Yellow) Course
- Designed by: Seve Ballesteros
- Par: 71
- Length: 6,009 metres

Real Club de Campo Villa de Madrid, best known simply as Club de Campo, is a country and sports club located in Madrid, Spain. The club was formed in 1929, and is one of the most known in the city. It has a wide array of sports facilities including two championship 18-hole golf courses, hockey pitches, tennis and padel courts, horse-riding facilities and swimming pools.

Many are the sporting events celebrated annually at the club, including the Spain Golf Open and the Longines Global Champions Tour.

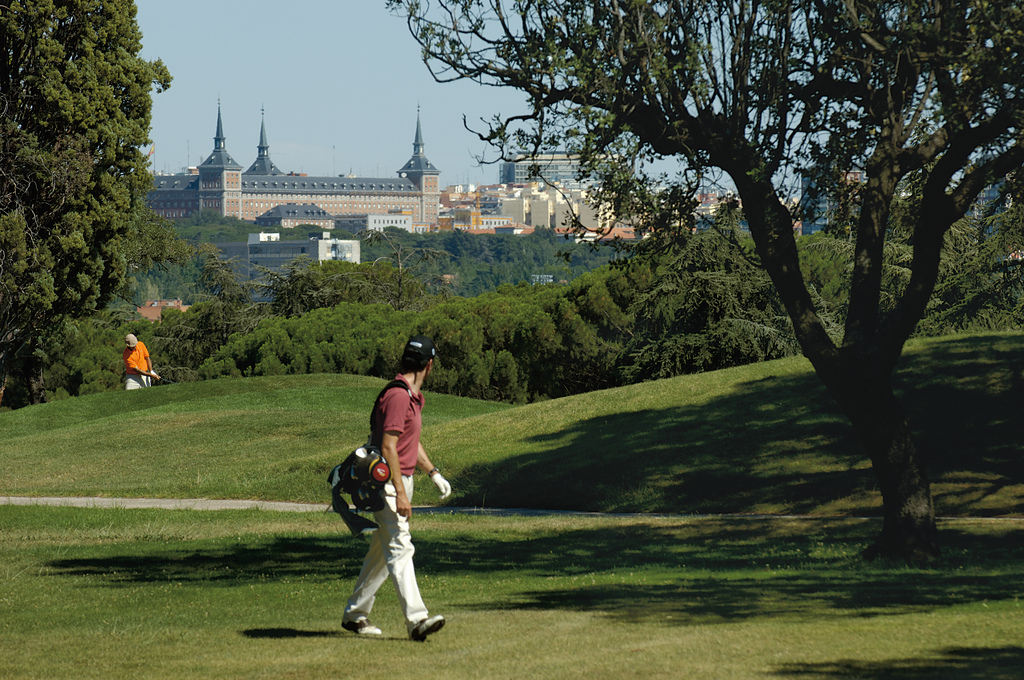
View of the Ministry of the Air from a golf hole

== Golf ==
The Javier Arana designed Negro (or Black) course opened in 1956, and has hosted the Open de España on many occasions. It has also been the venue for former European Tour events, the Madrid Masters and the Open de Madrid. The Amarillo (or Yellow) course was designed by Seve Ballesteros.

Year	Tournament	Winner
2019	Mutuactivos Open de España	(Spain) Jon Rahm
2008	Madrid Masters	(South Africa) Charl Schwartzel
2005	Open de Madrid	(France) Raphaël Jacquelin
2004	Open de Madrid	(South Africa) Richard Sterne
2003	Telefónica Open de Madrid	(Argentina) Ricardo González
2002	Telefónica Open de Madrid	(Denmark) Steen Tinning
2001	Telefónica Open de Madrid	(South Africa) Retief Goosen
1996	Peugeot Spanish Open	(Republic of Ireland) Pádraig Harrington
1995	Peugeot Spanish Open	(Spain) Seve Ballesteros
1994	Peugeot Spanish Open	(Scotland) Colin Montgomerie
1991	Peugeot Spanish Open	(Argentina) Eduardo Romero
1990	Peugeot Spanish Open	(Australia) Rodger Davis

== Hockey ==
Club de Campo
- Full name: S.A.D. Club de Campo Villa de Madrid
- League: Men's División de Honor; Women's División de Honor
- Founded: 1931; 95 years ago
- Home ground: Campo de Hockey Club de Campo (Capacity 1,000)

Personnel
- Chairman: Ana Elisa Rodríguez

The men's team won their first title in the 2020–21 season and the women's team have the most national titles with 22. The club hosted the 2006 Women's World Cup, won by The Netherlands.

=== Honours ===
==== Men ====
División de Honor

- Winners (3): 2020–21, 2022–23, 2023–24
- Runners-up (7): 1957–58, 1980–81, 1981–82, 1985–86, 2009–10, 2010–11, 2012–13

Copa del Rey

- Winners (15): 1934, 1935, 1936, 1940, 1953, 1954, 1956, 1977, 1978, 2004, 2005, 2011, 2012, 2023, 2025

Euro Hockey League

- Runners-up (1): 2010–11

EuroHockey Cup Winners Cup

- Winners (1) 2005

EuroHockey Indoor Club Cup

- Runners-up (1): 2009

EuroHockey Indoor Club Trophy

- Runners-up (1): 2006

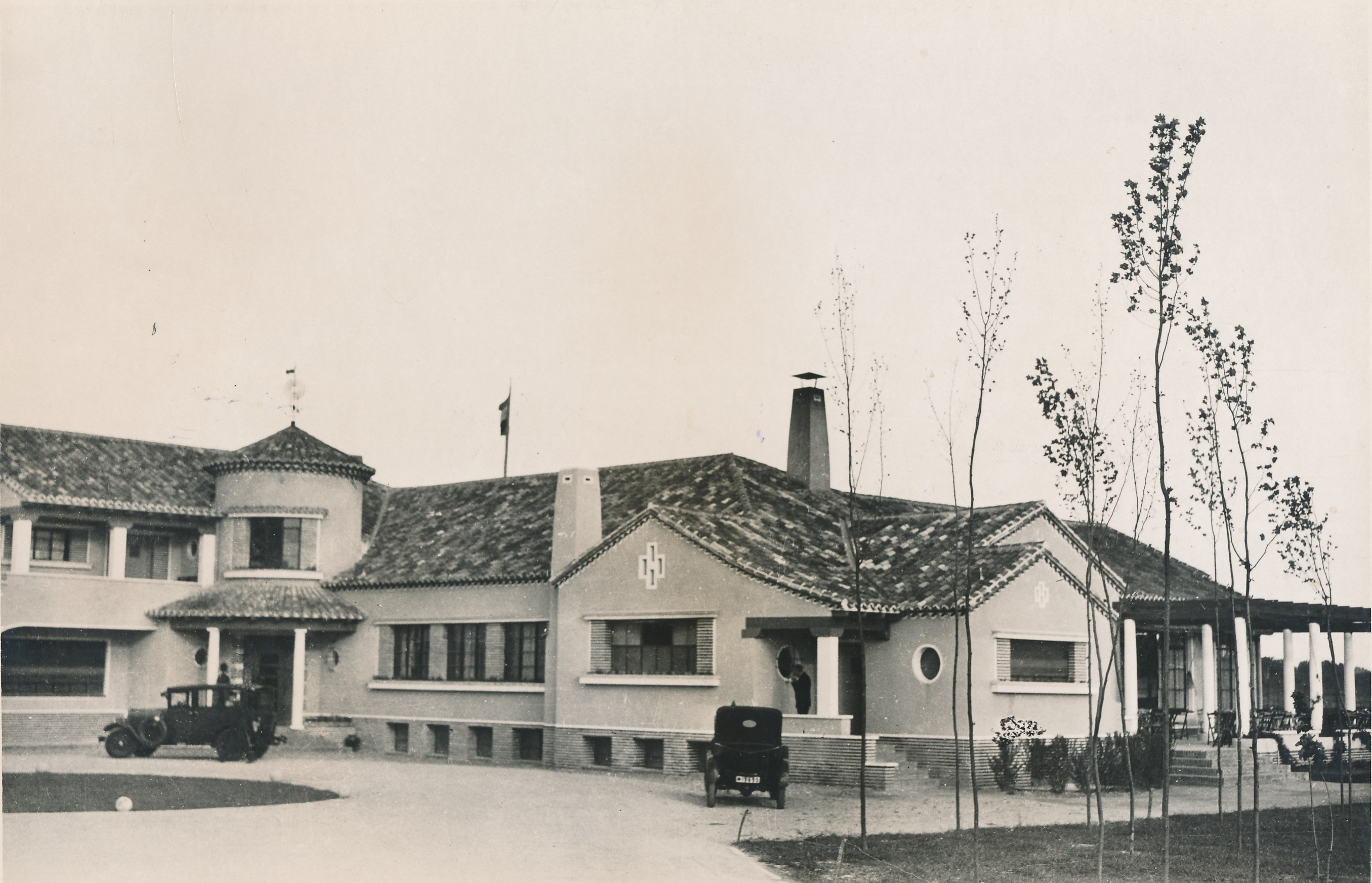
The original clubhouse, 1931

==== Women ====
División de Honor

- Winners (22): 1973–74, 1974–75, 1975–76, 1983–84, 1986–87, 1987–88, 1988–89, 1989–90, 1990–91, 1991–92, 1994–95, 2003–04, 2006–07, 2008–09, 2009–10, 2010–11, 2011–12, 2013–14, 2014–15, 2016–17, 2018–19, 2020–21

Copa de la Reina

- Winners (19): 1989, 1991, 1992, 1995, 1999, 2006, 2008, 2009, 2010, 2011, 2012, 2014, 2016, 2017, 2018, 2019, 2020, 2022, 2024

Euro Hockey League

- Runners-up (2): 2021, 2023

EuroHockey Club Champions Cup

- Runners-up (1): 2008

EuroHockey Club Trophy

- Winners (1): 2019
- Runners-up (2): 1989, 2017

EuroHockey Cup Winners Cup

- Winners (1): 2007
- Runners-up (1): 2009

EuroHockey Indoor Club Cup

- Runners-up (7): 2008, 2010, 2013, 2014, 2015, 2016, 2018

EuroHockey Indoor Club Trophy

- Winners (1): 2005

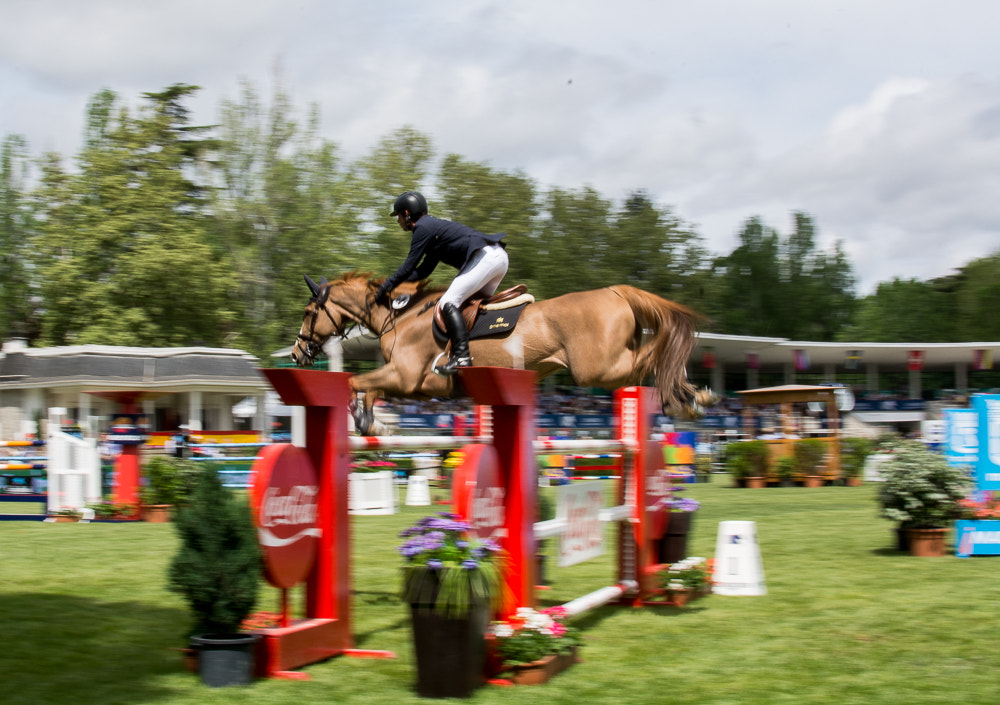
Show jumping at the Longines Global Champions, 2019

=== Current squad ===
==== Men's squad ====
Head coach: Pablo Usoz

As of 2021–22

Pos.	Nation	Player
	ESP	Lucas Garcia
	ESP	Borja Lacalle
	ESP	Tomás Terradas
	ESP	Anton Parente
	ESP	Álvaro Tello
	ESP	Ignacio Abajo
DF	ESP	Ricardo Sánchez
FW	ESP	José Basterra
FW	ESP	Quique González

Pos.	Nation	Player
MF	ESP	Álvaro Iglesias
DF	ESP	Andrés Mir
	ARG	Joaquin Puglisi
DF	ESP	Ignacio Rodríguez
	ESP	Álvaro Portugal
	ESP	Enrique Zorita
MF	ESP	Alejandro de Frutos
GK	ESP	Mario Garín

==== Women's squad ====
Head coach: Eduardo Aguilar

As of September 2020

No.	Pos.	Nation	Player
1	GK	ESP	María Ruiz
2	DF	ESP	Rocío Gutiérrez
4		ESP	Sara Barrios
7	MF	ARG	Pilar Campoy
9		ESP	Amparo Gil
10	MF	ESP	Beatriz Pérez
11	FW	ESP	Begoña García Grau
12	DF	ESP	María López García

No.	Pos.	Nation	Player
14		ESP	Carmen Cano
15		ESP	Belen Gonzalez
16		ESP	Candela Mejías
17		ESP	Lucia Abajo
20		ESP	Laura Barrios
21		ESP	Ana Marquinez
24	MF	ESP	Alejandra Torres-Quevedo
25	FW	ESP	Alicia Magaz

== Tennis ==
The club hosted the 2008 Fed Cup final, when Russia defeated Spain 4–0.
