= Carmen Cano =

Spanish field hockey player

Personal information
- Full name: Carmen Cano Ruiz
- Born: 31 December 1992 (age 33)

Sport
- Sport: Field hockey
- Club: Club de Campo
National team
Years	Team	Caps	Goals
–	Spain	46	-
Medal record
World Cup
Bronze medal – third place	2018 London
European Championship
Bronze medal – third place	2019 Antwerp

Carmen Cano Ruiz (born 31 December 1992) is a Spanish field hockey player for the Spanish national team.

She participated at the 2018 Women's Hockey World Cup.
