= Beatriz Pérez =

Spanish field hockey player (born 1991)

Personal information
- Full name: Beatriz Pérez Lagunas
- Born: 4 May 1991 (age 35) Santander, Spain
- Height: 1.67 m (5 ft 6 in)
- Weight: 60 kg (132 lb)

Sport
- Sport: Field hockey
- Position: Midfielder
- Club: Club de Campo
Senior career
Years	Team	Caps	Goals
–	Club de Campo	-	-
National team
Years	Team	Caps	Goals
–	Spain	167	-
Medal record
World Cup
Bronze medal – third place	2018 London
European Championship
Bronze medal – third place	2019 Antwerp

Beatriz Pérez Lagunas (born 4 May 1991) is a Spanish field hockey midfielder who is part of the Spain women's national field hockey team.

She was part of the Spanish team at the 2016 Summer Olympics in Rio de Janeiro, where they finished eighth. On club level she plays for Club de Campo in Spain
