= Begoña García (field hockey) =

Spanish field hockey player (born 1995)

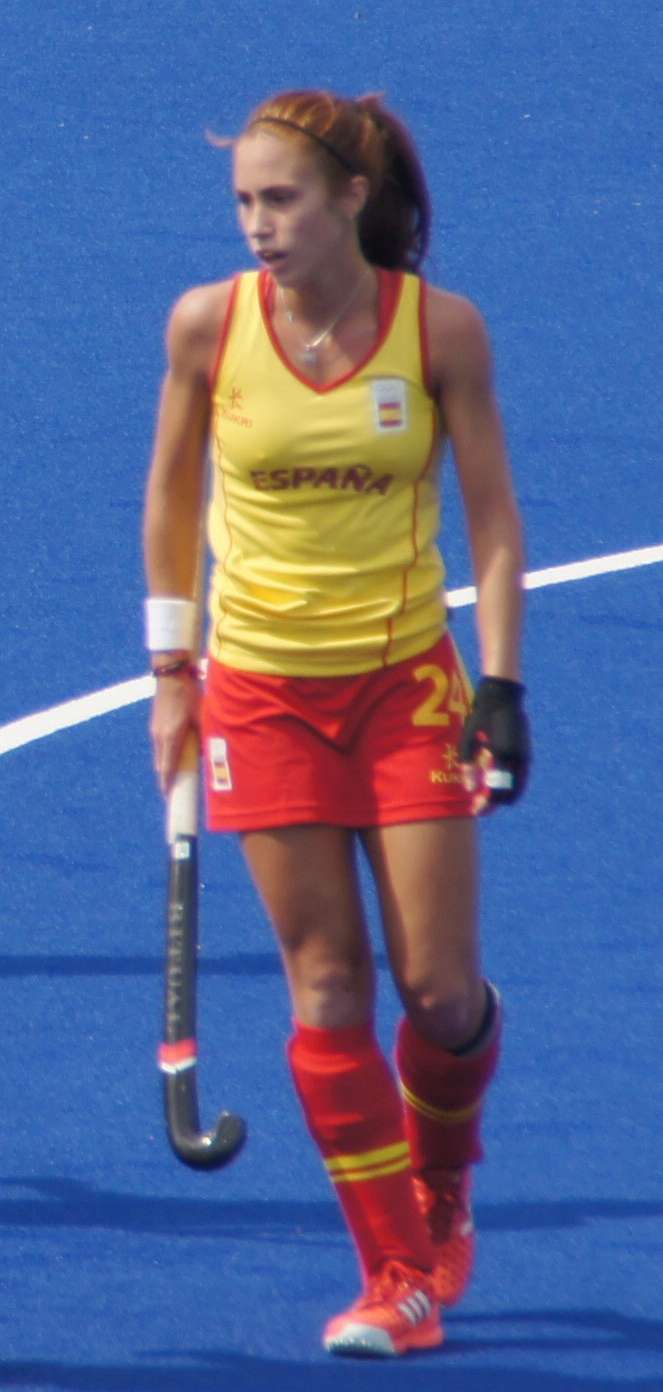
- García at the 2016 Olympics

Personal information
- Full name: Begoña García Grau
- Born: 19 July 1995 (age 31) Zaragoza, Spain
- Height: 1.64 m (5 ft 5 in)
- Weight: 54 kg (119 lb)

Sport
- Sport: Field hockey
- Position: Forward
- Club: Club de Campo
Senior career
| Years | Team | Caps | Goals |
| –2017 | Complutense | - | - |
| 2017–present | Club de Campo | - | - |
National team
| Years | Team | Caps | Goals |
| 2014–present | Spain | 135 | (33) |
Medal record
World Cup
| Bronze medal – third place | 2018 London |
European Championship
| Bronze medal – third place | 2019 Antwerp |

Begoña García Grau (born 19 July 1995) is a Spanish field hockey player who plays as a forward for Club de Campo and the Spanish national team. She competed in the 2016 Summer Olympics.
