= María López García =

Spanish field hockey player (born 1990)

María López
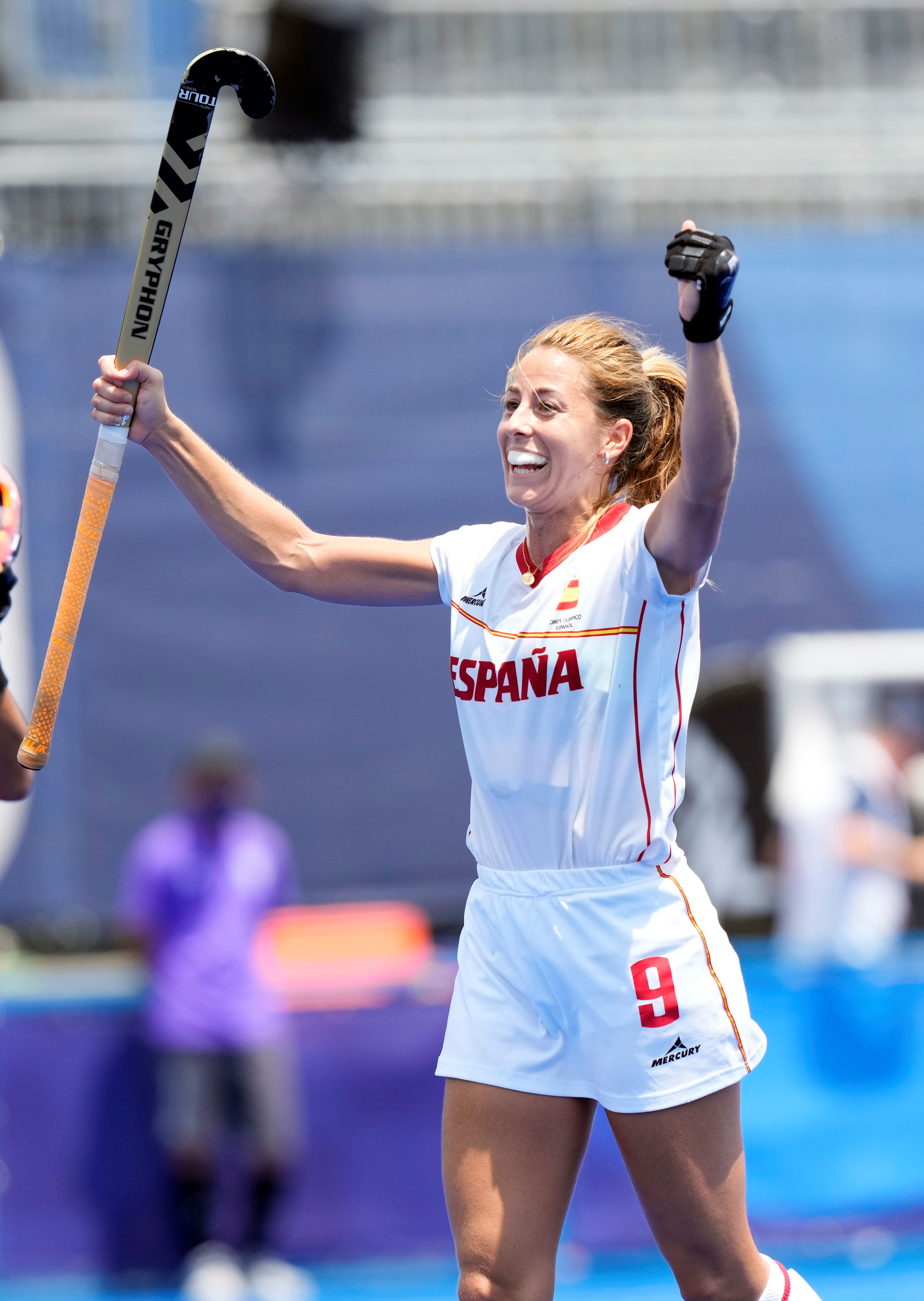

Personal information
- Full name: María López García
- Born: 16 February 1990 (age 36) Gijón, Spain

Sport
- Sport: Field hockey
- Position: defender
- Club: Club de Campo
Senior career
Years	Team	Caps	Goals
–	Club de Campo	-	-
National team
Years	Team	Caps	Goals
–	Spain	76	-
Medal record
World Cup
Bronze medal – third place	2018 London
European Championship
Bronze medal – third place	2019 Antwerp

María López García (born 16 February 1990) is a field hockey defender and part of the Spain women's national field hockey team.

== Career ==
She was part of the Spanish team at the 2016 Summer Olympics in Rio de Janeiro, where they finished 8th, and 2020 Summer Olympics in Tokyo, where they finished 7th. On club level she plays for Club de Campo in Spain
