= 2013 Women's Hockey Junior World Cup squads =

This article lists the confirmed squads for the 2013 Women's FIH Hockey Junior World Cup tournament held in Mönchengladbach, Germany between 27 July and 4 August 2013.

== Pool A ==
=== Ghana ===
Head coach: Edmund Odametey

1. Bridget Azumah (GK)
2. Janet Adampa
3. Linda Barnie
4. Bennedicta Adjei
5. Emilia Fosuaa
6. Esther Ofori
7. Serwaa Boakye
8. Cecilia Amoako
9. Gloria Darko
10. Elizabeth Opoku
11. Martha Sarfoa
12. Ernestina Coffie
13. Cynthia Fio
14. Queensilla Shaibu
15. Nafisatu Umaru (C)
16. Theresa Mills
17. Susanna Danquah
22. Joana Adjei (GK)

=== Netherlands ===
Head coach: Raoul Ehren

1. Anne Veenendaal (GK)
2. Lieke van Wijk
3. Xan de Waard
4. Sam Saxton
5. Laura Nunnink
6. Laurien Leurink
7. Sarah Jaspers
8. Floor Ouwerling
9. Maria Verschoor
10. Renske Siersema (C)
11. Elsie Nix
12. Marloes Keetels
13. Saskia van Duivenboden (GK)
14. Lisa Scheerlinck
15. Lisanne de Lange
16. Juliëtte van Hattum
17. Mila Muyselaar
22. Lauren Stam

=== South Korea ===
Head coach: Yoo Kwang-Hee

1. Jung Hea-Bin (GK)
3. Cho Mi-Young
5. Cho Hye-Jin
6. Kim Mi-Ri
7. Kook Min-Ji
8. Shin Hye-Jeong
10. Choi Su-Ja
11. Lee Ha-Na
12. Park Ju-Hui
13. Kim Hyun-Ji
14. Nam So-Ri
15. Lee Yu-Ri
17. Choi Eun-Jin
18. Song Bo-Ram
20. Cha Ye-Sol
22. Han Mi-Jin (GK)
23. Cheon Eun-Bi (C)
24. Kang Ji-Na

=== United States ===
Head coach: Steve Jennings

1. Samantha Carlino (GK)
2. Maxine Fluharty
3. Marie Elena Bolles
4. Emma Bolles
5. Laura Gebhart (C)
7. Tara Vittese
8. Aileen Johnson
9. Emily Wold
10. Georgia Holland
11. Hannah Prince
12. Teresa Benvenuti
13. Kelsey Harbin
14. Katie Gerzabek
15. Ainsley McCallister
16. Lauren Blazing (GK)
17. Anna Dessoye
23. Kelsey Smither
30. Nikki Parsley

== Pool B ==
=== Argentina ===
Head coach: Santiago Capurro

1. Sofía Montserrat (GK)
2. Julia Gomes
3. Agustina Metidieri
4. Lucía Sanguinetti
5. Jimena Cedrés
6. Victoria Cabut
7. Agustina Albertario
8. Florencia Habif (C)
9. Pilar Romang
10. Agustina Habif
11. Roberta Werthein
12. Antonella Brondello (GK)
13. Lara Ravetta
14. Mercedes Correa
15. Magdalena Fernández
16. Sofía Villarroya
17. María Granatto
18. Luciana Molina

=== Canada ===
Head coach: Ian Rutledge

2. Lauren Logsuh (GK)
3. Rachel Donohoe
4. Priya Randhawa
5. Ashley Kristen
8. Stephanie Norlander
9. Amanda Woodcroft
10. Kathleen Leahy
11. Karli Johansen (C)
12. Sydney Veljacic
13. Hannah Haughn (C)
14. Jessica Buttinger
15. Carolina Romeo
16. Natalie Sourisseau (C)
17. Sara McManus (C)
19. Holly Stewart
20. Caashia Karringten
22. Madeline Secco
30. Beatrice Francisco (GK)

=== China ===
Head coach: Xu Dong Guo

1. Ye Jiao (GK)
2. Ou Zixia
3. Liu Yuyue
4. Zhang Lijia
5. Shen Yang
6. You Jiaao
7. Chen Xin
8. Yuan Meng (C)
9. Gu Bingfeng
10. Zhang Jinrong
11. Liu Meng
12. Tu Yidan
13. Li Hong
14. Zhang Xindan
15. Sun Jing
16. Chen Yang
18. Yu Yaran (GK)
19. Cui Luyao

=== South Africa ===
Head coach: Lindsey Wright

1. Phumelela Mbande (GK)
2. Sherry King
3. Izelle Lategan (C)
4. Nika Nel
5. Tanya Britz
6. Taryn Mallett
7. Jacinta Jubb
8. Bronwyn Kretzmann
9. Liné Malan
10. Tiffany Jones
11. Lilian du Plessis
12. Suléke Brand
13. Erin Hunter
14. Nicole Walraven
15. Tarryn Glasby
19. Toni Marks
20. Nicole la Fleur (GK)
21. Quanita Bobbs

== Pool C ==
=== Australia ===
Head coach: Craig Victory

1. Amelia Spence
2. Georgia Nanscawen
5. Audrey Smith (GK)
6. Brooke Peris
9. Anna Flanagan
10. Elizabeth Duguid (GK)
11. Karri McMahon
16. Jane Claxton (C)
18. Kate Gilmore
19. Kathryn Slattery
20. Lily Brazel
21. Madison Fitzpatrick
23. Mathilda Carmichael
25. Jade Warrender
26. Emily Smith
27. Murphy Allendorf
29. Nina Khoury
30. Jordyn Holzberger

=== India ===
Head coach: Neil Hawgood

1. Sanarik Ningombam (GK)
2. Pinky Devi Thokchom
3. Deep Grace Ekka
4. Sushila Chanu (C)
5. Namita Toppo
6. Monika Malik
9. Poonam Rani
10. Vandana Katariya
11. Lilima Minz
12. Navneet Kaur
13. Anupa Barla
14. Navjot Kaur
16. Bigan Soy (GK)
17. Lily Mayengbam
20. M. N. Ponnamma
28. Rani Rampal
30. Ritusha Arya
32. Manjit Kaur

=== New Zealand ===
Head coach: Chris Leslie

1. Georgia Barnett (GK)
2. Sophie Cocks
3. Rhiannon Dennison
4. Michaela Curtis (C)
5. Genevieve Macilquham
6. Sian Fremaux
7. Sarah Matthews (GK)
8. Rachel McCann
10. Erin Goad
12. Danielle Sutherland
13. Phillipa Symes
14. Julia King
15. Kim Tanner
16. Brooke Neal
17. Elizabeth Thompson
18. Jenny Storey
19. Rose Keddell
22. Cassandra Reid

=== Russia ===
Head coach: Vladimir Kobzev

1. Olga Chugunova (GK)
2. Anna Egorova
3. Anna Sidorenko
4. Anna Efremova
5. Svetlana Salamatina (C)
7. Anastasia Miroshnikova
8. Daria Kotina
9. Elena Vavilova
12. Natalia Kovganiuk
13. Alexandra Sosnina
14. Anna Krokhina
15. Polina Delova
16. Kseniia Koroleva
18. Viktoriia Aleksandrina (GK)
19. Anastasia Bryutova
20. Elena Guseva
23. Antonia Levashova
28. Iuliia Petrishcheva

== Pool D ==
=== Belgium ===
Head coach: Shane McLeod

1. Elena Sotgiu (GK)
2. Malou Blank (GK)
3. Floriane Vilain
4. Florence Stappaerts
5. Charlotte Verelst
6. Noemie de Cocker
7. Pauline Leclef
8. Julie Fosseprez
9. Justine de Vooght (C)
10. Estelle Meulemans
11. Silke Steenackers
12. Suzanne Geeraerts
13. Axelle Wouters
14. Emma Puvrez
15. Caroline Struijk
16. Emilie Meyvis
18. Julie de Paeuw
20. Anne-Sophie Weyns

=== England ===
Head coach: Craig Keegan

1. Caitlin Jeffries (GK)
2. Amy Tennant (GK)
3. Olivia Chilton
4. Josie Inverdale
5. Fran Tew
6. Alice Sharp
7. Suzy Petty
8. Emily Defroand
9. Lucy Hyams
10. Hannah Martin
11. Anna Toman
12. Sophie Crosley
13. Grace Balsdon
14. Joie Leigh
15. Rebecca van Berkel
16. Eliza Brett
17. Stephanie Addison
24. Shona McCallin (C)

=== Germany ===
Head coach: Marc Herbert

1. Lisa Schneider (GK)
2. Nathalie Kubalski (GK)
3. Jana Gonnermann
6. Pia Lhotak
7. Lea Stöckel
9. Pia-Sophie Oldhafer
10. Anne Schröder
11. Anissa Korth
13. Darja Moellenberg
14. Lara May
15. Sabine Kneupfer
16. Viola Scharf
17. Rebecca Grote (C)
18. Sarah Sprink
19. Marilena Krauss
20. Charlotte Stapenhorst
22. Cécile Pieper
26. Sophie Willig

=== Spain ===
Head coach: Jorge Donoso

1. Inés Arias (GK)
2. Marta Segú
6. Júlia Pons
7. Andrea Guerra
8. Carola Salvatella
10. Berta Bonastre (C)
11. Cristina Guinea
12. Marta Bosque
13. Ana Marquinez
14. Carmen Cano
15. Cristina Salvatella
16. María Tost
18. Maider Altuna
19. Patricia Maraña
20. Xantal Giné
21. Mariona Girabent (GK)
25. Alicia Magaz
