= 2018 Women's Hockey World Cup squads =

This article lists the confirmed squads for the 2018 Women's Hockey World Cup tournament to be held in London, England between 21 July and 5 August 2018.

== Pool A ==
=== China ===
The squad was announced on 11 June 2018.

Head coach: Jamilon Mülders

2. Gu Bingfeng (C)
3. Song Xiaoming
7. Cui Qiuxia (C)
9. Xu Wenyu
10. Peng Yang
12. Guo Qiu
16. Ou Zixia (C)
17. Yong Jing
19. Zhang Xiaoxue
20. He Jiangxin
21. Liu Meng
22. Chen Yi (GK)
24. Wang Shumin
26. Chen Yang
27. Tu Yidan
28. Wu Qiong
31. Zhong Jiaqi
32. Ye Jiao (GK)

=== Italy ===
The squad was announced on 4 July 2018.

Head coach: Roberto Carta

2. Celina Traverso
7. Valentina Braconi
8. Eugenia Bianchi
9. Eugenia Garraffo
10. Dalila Mirabella
12. Martina Chirico (GK)
14. Elisabetta Pacella
15. Mercedes Socino
17. Chiara Tiddi (C)
18. Federica Carta
20. Jasbeer Singh
21. Agata Wybieralska
22. Clara Cusimano (GK)
23. Maryna Vynohradova
25. Giuliana Ruggieri
27. Lara Oviedo
28. Ivanna Pessina
32. Marcela Casale

=== Netherlands ===
The squad was announced on 3 July 2018.

Head coach: Alyson Annan

1. Anne Veenendaal (GK)
3. Sanne Koolen
4. Kitty van Male
5. Malou Pheninckx
6. Laurien Leurink
7. Xan de Waard
8. Marloes Keetels
9. Carlien Dirkse van den Heuvel (C)
10. Kelly Jonker
12. Lidewij Welten
13. Caia van Maasakker
15. Frédérique Matla
17. Ireen van den Assem
20. Laura Nunnink
21. Lauren Stam
22. Josine Koning (GK)
23. Margot van Geffen
24. Eva de Goede

=== South Korea ===
The squad was announced on 4 July 2018.

Head coach: Huh Sang-young

2. Choi Su-ji
4. Kim Young-ran (C)
5. Lee Yu-rim
6. Bae So-ra (GK)
8. An Hyo-ju
10. Park Mi-hyun
11. Park Seung-a
12. Lee Young-sil
13. Cho Eun-ji
14. Cho Yun-kyoung
16. Cheon Seul-ki
17. Kim Ok-ju
18. Kim Bo-mi
19. Cho Hye-jin
21. Shin Hye-jeong
22. Jang Hee-sun
23. Lee Yu-ri
31. Hwang Hyeon-a (GK)

== Pool B ==
=== England ===
The squad was announced on 4 July 2018.

Head coach: Danny Kerry

1. Maddie Hinch (GK)
3. Kathryn Lane
4. Laura Unsworth
5. Sarah Haycroft
6. Anna Toman
7. Hannah Martin
9. Susannah Townsend
11. Suzy Petty
13. Ellie Rayer
15. Alex Danson (C)
18. Giselle Ansley
19. Sophie Bray
20. Hollie Webb
21. Ellie Watton
23. Amy Tennant (GK)
26. Lily Owsley
27. Jo Hunter
31. Grace Balsdon

=== India ===
The squad was announced on 29 June 2018.

Head coach: Sjoerd Marijne

| No. | Pos. | Player | Date of birth (age) | Caps | Club |
|---|---|---|---|---|---|
| 11 | GK | Savita Punia | 11 July 1990 (aged 28) | 169 | (India) Hockey Haryana |
| 13 | GK | Rajani Etimarpu | 9 June 1990 (aged 28) | 74 | (India) Railways |
| 26 | DF | Sunita Lakra | 11 June 1991 (aged 27) | 132 | (India) NALCO |
| 3 | DF | Deep Grace Ekka | 3 June 1994 (aged 24) | 164 | (India) Railways |
| 17 | DF | Deepika Thakur | 7 February 1987 (aged 31) | 219 | (India) Railways |
| 2 | DF | Gurjit Kaur | 25 October 1995 (aged 22) | 55 | (India) Hockey Punjab |
| 6 | DF | Reena Khokhar | 10 April 1993 (aged 25) | 14 | (India) Madhya Pradesh Hockey Academy |
| 19 | MF | Namita Toppo | 4 June 1995 (aged 23) | 149 | (India) Western Railways |
| 31 | MF | Lilima Minz | 10 April 1994 (aged 24) | 116 | (India) Railways |
| 4 | MF | Monika Malik | 5 November 1993 (aged 24) | 117 | (India) Central Railways |
| 32 | MF | Neha Goyal | 15 November 1996 (aged 21) | 36 | (India) Haryana |
| 1 | MF | Navjot Kaur | 7 March 1995 (aged 23) | 133 | (India) Rail Coach Factory |
| 8 | MF | Nikki Pradhan | 8 December 1993 (aged 24) | 69 | (India) Railways Sports Promotion Board |
| 28 | FW | Rani Rampal (C) | 4 December 1994 (aged 23) | 213 | (India) Railways |
| 16 | FW | Vandana Katariya | 15 April 1993 (aged 25) | 201 | (India) Central Railways |
| 25 | FW | Navneet Kaur | 26 January 1996 (aged 22) | 40 | (India) Western Railways |
| 20 | FW | Lalremsiami | 30 March 2000 (aged 18) | 25 | Sports Authority of India |
| 18 | FW | Udita | 14 June 1998 (aged 20) | 15 | (India) Hockey Haryana |

=== Ireland ===
Head coach: Graham Shaw

| No. | Pos. | Player | Date of birth (age) | Caps | Club |
|---|---|---|---|---|---|
| 1 | GK | Grace O'Flanagan | 7 April 1989 (aged 29) | 34 | (Ireland) Railway Union |
| 19 | GK | Ayeisha McFerran | 10 January 1996 (aged 22) | 73 | (United States) Louisville Cardinals |
| 4 | DF | Yvonne O'Byrne | 2 January 1992 (aged 26) | 113 | (Ireland) Cork Harlequins |
| 11 | DF | Megan Frazer | 2 October 1990 (aged 27) | 128 | (Germany) Mannheim |
| 12 | DF | Elena Tice | 16 November 1997 (aged 20) | 68 | (Ireland) UCD Ladies |
| 23 | DF | Hannah Matthews | 24 March 1991 (aged 27) | 108 | (Ireland) Loreto |
| 27 | DF | Zoe Wilson | 15 February 1997 (aged 21) | 74 | (Ireland) Belfast Harlequins |
| 10 | MF | Shirley McCay | 7 June 1988 (aged 30) | 267 | (Ireland) Pegasus |
| 15 | MF | Gillian Pinder | 5 May 1992 (aged 26) | 137 | (Ireland) Pembroke Wanderers |
| 18 | MF | Roisin Upton | 1 April 1994 (aged 24) | 39 | (Ireland) Cork Harlequins |
| 20 | MF | Chloe Watkins | 7 March 1992 (aged 26) | 194 | (Netherlands) HC Bloemendaal |
| 21 | MF | Lizzie Colvin | 4 January 1990 (aged 28) | 160 | (Ireland) Belfast Harlequins |
| 30 | MF | Alison Meeke | 7 June 1991 (aged 27) | 114 | (Ireland) Loreto |
| 8 | FW | Nicola Evans | 17 January 1990 (aged 28) | 163 | (Germany) Uhlenhorster HC |
| 9 | FW | Katie Mullan (C) | 7 April 1994 (aged 24) | 151 | (Ireland) UCD Ladies |
| 14 | FW | Emily Beatty | 26 January 1996 (aged 22) | 78 | (Ireland) Pembroke Wanderers |
| 22 | FW | Nicola Daly | 3 April 1988 (aged 30) | 163 | (Ireland) Loreto |
| 26 | FW | Anna O'Flanagan | 18 February 1990 (aged 28) | 168 | (Netherlands) HC Bloemendaal |
| 28 | FW | Deirdre Duke | 9 June 1992 (aged 26) | 103 | (Ireland) UCD Ladies |

=== United States ===
The squad was announced on 3 July 2018.

Head coach: Janneke Schopman

1. Erin Matson
2. Stefanie Fee
5. Melissa González (C)
9. Michelle Vittese
10. Jill Funk
12. Amanda Magadan
13. Ashley Hoffman
14. Julia Young
19. Lauren Moyer
20. Ali Froede
21. Nicole Woods
22. Lauren Blazing (GK)
23. Tara Vittese
24. Kathleen Sharkey
26. Margaux Paolino
28. Caitlin Van Sickle
29. Alyssa Manley
31. Jaclyn Briggs (GK)

== Pool C ==
=== Argentina ===
The squad was announced on 24 May 2018.

Head coach: Agustín Corradini

1. Belén Succi (GK)
4. Eugenia Trinchinetti
5. Agostina Alonso
6. Bianca Donati
7. Martina Cavallero
10. Magdalena Fernández Ladra
12. Delfina Merino (C)
14. Agustina Habif
15. María José Granatto
16. Florencia Habif
17. Rocío Sánchez Moccia
19. Agustina Albertario
20. Lucina von der Heyde
26. Paula Ortiz
27. Noel Barrionuevo
28. Julieta Jankunas
29. Julia Gomes Fantasia
31. Florencia Mutio (GK)

=== Germany ===
The squad was announced on 25 June 2018.

Head coach: Xavier Reckinger

3. Amelie Wortmann
4. Nike Lorenz
5. Selin Oruz
6. Hannah Gablać
8. Anne Schröder
9. Elisa Gräve
11. Lena Micheel
12. Charlotte Stapenhorst
14. Janne Müller-Wieland (C)
15. Nathalie Kubalski (GK)
17. Jana Teschke
18. Lisa Hahn
19. Maike Schaunig
20. Julia Ciupka (GK)
21. Franzisca Hauke
22. Cécile Pieper
23. Marie Mävers
25. Viktoria Huse

=== South Africa ===
The squad was announced on 7 June 2018.

Head coach: Sheldon Rostron

4. Nicole Walraven
5. Simoné Gouws
8. Kristen Paton
10. Shelley Russell
11. Kara-Lee Botes
12. Dirkie Chamberlain
13. Lisa-Marie Deetlefs
16. Erin Hunter
17. Candice Manuel
19. Lilian du Plessis
20. Nicolene Terblanche
21. Ongeziwe Mali
24. Phumelela Mbande (GK)
27. Jade Mayne
28. Quanita Bobbs
29. Tarryn Glasby
30. Sulette Damons (C)
31. Marlise van Tonder (GK)

=== Spain ===
The squad was announced on 5 July 2018.

Head coach: Adrian Lock

1. María Ruiz (GK)
2. Rocío Gutiérrez
7. Carlota Petchamé
8. Carola Salvatella
9. María López
10. Berta Bonastre
11. Cristina Guinea
12. Carmen Cano
15. Maialen García
17. Lola Riera
18. Julia Pons
19. Begoña García Grau
20. Xantal Giné
21. Beatriz Pérez
23. Georgina Oliva (c)
25. Alicia Magaz
29. Lucía Jiménez
32. Melanie García (GK)

== Pool D ==
=== Australia ===
The squad was announced on 26 June 2018.

Head coach: Paul Gaudoin

| No. | Pos. | Player | Date of birth (age) | Caps | Club |
|---|---|---|---|---|---|
| 19 | GK | Jocelyn Bartram | 4 May 1993 (aged 25) | 31 | (Australia) NSW Arrows |
| 27 | GK | Rachael Lynch | 2 July 1986 (aged 32) | 182 | (Australia) VIC Vipers |
| 7 | DF | Jodie Kenny | 18 August 1987 (aged 30) | 201 | (Australia) QLD Scorchers |
| 10 | DF | Madison Fitzpatrick | 14 December 1996 (aged 21) | 37 | (Australia) QLD Scorchers |
| 11 | DF | Karri McMahon | 27 February 1992 (aged 26) | 133 | (Australia) SA Suns |
| 13 | DF | Edwina Bone | 29 April 1988 (aged 30) | 154 | (Australia) Canberra Strikers |
| 15 | DF | Kaitlin Nobbs | 24 September 1997 (aged 20) | 37 | (Australia) NSW Arrows |
| 17 | DF | Georgina Morgan | 15 May 1993 (aged 25) | 66 | (Australia) NSW Arrows |
| 14 | MF | Stephanie Kershaw | 19 April 1995 (aged 23) | 43 | (Australia) QLD Scorchers |
| 21 | MF | Renee Taylor | 28 September 1996 (aged 21) | 52 | (Australia) QLD Scorchers |
| 23 | MF | Kalindi Commerford | 18 November 1994 (aged 23) | 14 | (Australia) Canberra Strikers |
| 28 | MF | Kristina Bates | 9 January 1996 (aged 22) | 24 | (Australia) VIC Vipers |
| 2 | FW | Ambrosia Malone | 8 January 1998 (aged 20) | 8 | (Australia) QLD Scorchers |
| 3 | FW | Brooke Peris | 16 January 1993 (aged 25) | 128 | (Australia) NT Pearls |
| 4 | FW | Emily Hurtz | 2 January 1990 (aged 28) | 106 | (Australia) VIC Vipers |
| 20 | FW | Kathryn Slattery | 30 July 1993 (aged 24) | 85 | (Australia) WA Diamonds |
| 26 | FW | Emily Smith (C) | 28 July 1992 (aged 25) | 200 | (Australia) NSW Arrows |
| 30 | FW | Grace Stewart | 28 April 1997 (aged 21) | 48 | (Australia) NSW Arrows |

=== Belgium ===
The squad was announced on 6 July 2018.

Head coach: Niels Thiessen

2. Sophie Limauge
3. Louise Cavenaile
4. Aline Fobe
6. Anouk Raes (C)
7. Judith Vandermeiren
8. Emma Puvrez
10. Louise Versavel
11. Joanne Peeters
13. Alix Gerniers
15. Anne-Sophie Weyns
17. Michelle Struijk
19. Barbara Nelen
21. Aisling D'Hooghe (GK)
22. Stephanie Vanden Borre
23. Elena Sotgiu (GK)
25. Pauline Leclef
26. Lien Hillewaert
27. Jill Boon

=== Japan ===
The squad was announced on 22 June 2018.

Head coach: Anthony Farry

1. Megumi Kageyama (GK)
2. Natsuki Naito (C)
3. Mayumi Ono
5. Yu Asai
7. Hazuki Nagai
8. Yukari Mano
9. Akiko Kato
10. Minami Shimizu
11. Kana Nomura
12. Yuri Nagai
13. Miki Kozuka
14. Maho Segawa
15. Yui Ishibashi
16. Shihori Oikawa
20. Mami Karino
22. Motomi Kawamura
27. Aki Yamada
30. Erika Akaya (GK)

=== New Zealand ===
The squad was announced on 3 July 2018.

Head coach: Mark Hager

| No. | Pos. | Player | Date of birth (age) | Caps | Club |
|---|---|---|---|---|---|
| 8 | GK | Sally Rutherford | 5 June 1981 (aged 37) | 164 | (New Zealand) Midlands |
| 25 | GK | Grace O'Hanlon | 10 September 1992 (aged 25) | 34 | (New Zealand) Auckland |
| 1 | DF | Tarryn Davey | 29 February 1996 (aged 22) | 31 | (New Zealand) Midlands |
| 5 | DF | Frances Davies | 18 October 1996 (aged 21) | 50 | (New Zealand) Midlands |
| 9 | DF | Brooke Neal | 4 July 1992 (aged 26) | 147 | (New Zealand) Northland |
| 12 | DF | Ella Gunson | 9 July 1989 (aged 29) | 191 | (New Zealand) Northland |
| 24 | DF | Elizabeth Thompson | 8 December 1994 (aged 23) | 166 | (New Zealand) Auckland |
| 24 | DF | Rose Keddell | 31 January 1994 (aged 24) | 176 | (New Zealand) Midlands |
| 6 | MF | Amy Robinson | 19 February 1996 (aged 22) | 49 | (New Zealand) Midlands |
| 13 | MF | Samantha Charlton | 7 December 1991 (aged 26) | 219 | (New Zealand) Midlands |
| 30 | MF | Louisa Tuilotolava | | 6 | (New Zealand) Auckland |
| 31 | MF | Stacey Michelsen (C) | 18 February 1991 (aged 27) | 254 | (New Zealand) Northland |
| 32 | MF | Anita McLaren | 2 October 1987 (aged 30) | 264 | (New Zealand) Capital |
| 2 | FW | Samantha Harrison | 29 August 1991 (aged 26) | 149 | (New Zealand) Auckland |
| 4 | FW | Olivia Merry | 16 March 1992 (aged 26) | 198 | (New Zealand) Canterbury |
| 25 | FW | Kelsey Smith | 24 August 1994 (aged 23) | 79 | (New Zealand) Capital |
| 28 | FW | Shiloh Gloyn | 6 November 1989 (aged 28) | 68 | (New Zealand) Midlands |
| 29 | FW | Madison Doar | 29 June 1999 (aged 19) | 23 | (New Zealand) Northland |
