= 2012 Women's EuroHockey Junior Championship =

Tournament details
- Host country: Netherlands
- City: 's-Hertogenbosch
- Dates: 26 August – 1 September
- Teams: 8 (from 1 confederation)

Final positions
- Champions: Netherlands (8th title)
- Runner-up: Spain
- Third place: England

Tournament statistics
- Matches played: 20
- Goals scored: 106 (5.3 per match)
- Best player: (Netherlands) Roos Drost

The 2012 Women's EuroHockey Junior Championships was the 16th edition of the Women's EuroHockey Junior Championship, an under 21 women's field hockey tournament. It was held in 's-Hertogenbosch, Netherlands between 26 August and 1 September 2012.

Netherlands won the tournament by defeating Spain 9–1 in the final. England won the bronze medal by defeating Germany 3–2 in the third place playoff.

== Participating nations ==
Alongside the host nation, 7 teams competed in the tournament.

- Belarus
- Belgium
- England
- France
- Germany
- Netherlands
- Poland
- Spain

== Results ==
=== Preliminary round ===
==== Pool A ====
| Pos | Team | Pld | W | D | L | GF | GA | GD | Pts | Qualification |
|---|---|---|---|---|---|---|---|---|---|---|
| 1 | Netherlands (H) | 3 | 3 | 0 | 0 | 35 | 3 | +32 | 9 | Semi-finals |
| 2 | Germany | 3 | 2 | 0 | 1 | 17 | 11 | +6 | 6 | Semi-finals |
| 3 | Poland | 3 | 1 | 0 | 2 | 5 | 19 | −14 | 3 | |
| 4 | Belarus | 3 | 0 | 0 | 3 | 1 | 25 | −24 | 0 | |

Source: todor66
Rules for classification: 1) points; 2) goal difference; 3) goals scored; 4) head-to-head result.
(H) Hosts

26 August 2012
13:30

| Germany | 8–1 | Poland |
|---|---|---|
| Andersch 1', 20'; Schniewind 13', 70'; Faust 27'; Notman 45'; Scharf 60'; Krauss 65' | Report | Zagajska 61' |

Umpires:
Magali Sergeant (BEL)
Lia Waine (ENG)

26 August 2012
14:00

| Netherlands | 15–0 | Belarus |
|---|---|---|
| Drost 1'; Van Wijk 6', 27', 27', 29', 33', 54'; Vega 12'; Van Silfhout 13', 24'; Saxton 23'; Van der Raad 38', 44'; Magis 40'; Siersema 58' | Report |

Umpires:
Heike Schöllmeyer (GER)
Sarah Wilson (SCO)

27 August 2012
17:45

| Belarus | 1–3 | Poland |
|---|---|---|
| Kliashchuk 70+' | Report | Marcinkowska 2'; Wittke 38'; Gabara 63' |

Umpires:
Marine de Witte (BEL)
Karine Alves (FRA)

27 August 2012
18:15

| Germany | 2–10 | Netherlands |
|---|---|---|
| Krauss 21', 37' | Report | Van Wijk 7', 19'; Keetels 3'; Vega 5', 8', 25'; Drost 39', 57'; Saxton 45'; Van Silfhout 63' |

Umpires:
Sarah Wilson (SCO)
Lia Waine (ENG)

29 August 2012
15:30

| Belarus | 0–7 | Germany |
|---|---|---|
| | Report | Notman 1'; Schniewind 7', 35'; Krauss 18', 34', 39'; Grote 23' |

Umpires:
Karine Alves (FRA)
Magali Sergeant (BEL)

29 August 2012
16:00

| Netherlands | 10–1 | Poland |
|---|---|---|
| Drost 2', 44'; Vega 6', 25', 67'; Van Wijk 8', 18', 34'; Magis 15'; Van der Raad 50' | Report | Sztybrych 36' |

Umpires:
Blanca Beltrán (ESP)
Heike Schöllmeyer (GER)

==== Pool B ====
| Pos | Team | Pld | W | D | L | GF | GA | GD | Pts | Qualification |
|---|---|---|---|---|---|---|---|---|---|---|
| 1 | Spain | 3 | 3 | 0 | 0 | 4 | 0 | +4 | 9 | Semi-finals |
| 2 | England | 3 | 2 | 0 | 1 | 6 | 1 | +5 | 6 | Semi-finals |
| 3 | Belgium | 3 | 1 | 0 | 2 | 3 | 2 | +1 | 3 | |
| 4 | France | 3 | 0 | 0 | 3 | 0 | 10 | −10 | 0 | |

Source: todor66
Rules for classification: 1) points; 2) goal difference; 3) goals scored; 4) head-to-head result.

26 August 2012
09:00

| England | 5–0 | France |
|---|---|---|
| Defroand 15'; Hunter 43', 63', 66'; Atkinson 51' | Report |

Umpires:
Urszula Wybieralska (POL)
Valentina Tomasi (ITA)

26 August 2012
09:30

| Spain | 1–0 | Belgium |
|---|---|---|
| Cano 24' | Report |

Umpires:
Fanneke Alkemade (NED)
Karine Alves (FRA)

27 August 2012
15:30

| Spain | 1–0 | England |
|---|---|---|
| Bosque 58' | Report |

Umpires:
Magali Sergeant (BEL)
Valentina Tomasi (ITA)

27 August 2012
16:00

| France | 0–3 | Belgium |
|---|---|---|
| | Report | Versavel 14', 58'; Weyns 37' |

Umpires:
Blanca Beltrán (ESP)
Urszula Wybieralska (POL)

29 August 2012
11:00

| France | 0–2 | Spain |
|---|---|---|
| | Report | Magaz 49'; Cano 63' |

Umpires:
Fanneke Alkemade (NED)
Marine de Witte (BEL)

29 August 2012
11:00

| England | 1–0 | Belgium |
|---|---|---|
| Owsley 16' | Report |

Umpires:
Valentina Tomasi (ITA)
Sarah Wilson (SCO)

=== Classification round ===
==== Fifth to eighth place classification ====
===== Pool C =====
| Pos | Team | Pld | W | D | L | GF | GA | GD | Pts | Relegation |
|---|---|---|---|---|---|---|---|---|---|---|
| 1 | Belgium | 3 | 2 | 1 | 0 | 7 | 1 | +6 | 7 | |
| 2 | France | 3 | 1 | 1 | 1 | 4 | 4 | 0 | 4 | |
| 3 | Poland | 3 | 1 | 1 | 1 | 4 | 5 | −1 | 4 | EuroHockey Junior Championship II |
| 4 | Belarus | 3 | 0 | 1 | 2 | 2 | 7 | −5 | 1 | EuroHockey Junior Championship II |

Source: todor66
Rules for classification: 1) points; 2) goal difference; 3) goals scored; 4) head-to-head result.

30 August 2012
15:30

| Belarus | 0–3 | France |
|---|---|---|
| | Report | Billore 7'; Perrocheau 32'; Huvelle 59' |

Umpires:
Marine de Witte (BEL)
Heike Schöllmeyer (GER)

30 August 2012
18:00

| Poland | 0–3 | Belgium |
|---|---|---|
| | Report | Leclef 4'; Steenackers 31', 65' |

Umpires:
Karine Alves (FRA)
Fanneke Alkemade (NED)

1 September 2012
07:30

| Belarus | 1–1 | Belgium |
|---|---|---|
| Kliashchuk 25' | Report | Versavel 3' |

Umpires:
Valentina Tomasi (ITA)
Urszula Wybieralska (POL)

1 September 2012
08:00

| Poland | 1–1 | France |
|---|---|---|
| Wałasek 27' | Report | Perrocheau 68' |

Umpires:
Magali Sergeant (BEL)
Marine de Witte (BEL)

==== First to fourth place classification ====
Semi-finals
30 August
Netherlands | 4
England | 1
30 August
Spain | 3
Germany | 2

Final
1 September
Netherlands | 9
Spain | 1
Third place
1 September
England (a.e.t) | 3
Germany | 2

===== Semi-finals =====
30 September 2012
16:00

| Spain | 3–2 | Germany |
|---|---|---|
| Riera 35', 43'; Bonastre 63' | Report | Notman 16', 54' |

Umpires:
Valentina Tomasi (ITA)
Lia Waine (ENG)

30 September 2012
18:30

| Netherlands | 4–1 | England |
|---|---|---|
| Pheninckx 28'; Vega 41'; Saxton 43'; Drost 62' | Report | McCallin 54' |

Umpires:
Sarah Wilson (SCO)
Magali Sergeant (BEL)

===== Third and fourth place =====
1 September 2012
12:30

| England | 3–2 (a.e.t.) | Germany |
|---|---|---|
| Hunter 40'; Inverdale 55'; McCallin 85' | Report | Krauss 19', 56' |

Umpires:
Fanneke Alkemade (NED)
Blanca Beltrán (ESP)

===== Final =====
1 September 2012
13:00

| Netherlands | 9–1 | Spain |
|---|---|---|
| Drost 2', 6', 25', 44', 64'; Van Wijk 15', 20', 42'; Magis 33' | Report | Riera 38' |

Umpires:
Lia Waine (ENG)
Sarah Wilson (SCO)

== Statistics ==
=== Final standings ===
As per statistical convention in field hockey, matches decided in extra time are counted as wins and losses, while matches decided by penalty shoot-outs are counted as draws.

| Pos | Team | Pld | W | D | L | GF | GA | GD | Pts | Qualification |
|---|---|---|---|---|---|---|---|---|---|---|
| 1st place, gold medalist(s) | Netherlands (H) | 5 | 5 | 0 | 0 | 48 | 5 | +43 | 15 | Qualified to 2013 FIH Junior World Cup |
| 2nd place, silver medalist(s) | Spain | 5 | 4 | 0 | 1 | 8 | 11 | −3 | 12 | Qualified to 2013 FIH Junior World Cup |
| 3rd place, bronze medalist(s) | England | 5 | 3 | 0 | 2 | 10 | 7 | +3 | 9 | Qualified to 2013 FIH Junior World Cup |
| 4 | Germany | 5 | 2 | 0 | 3 | 21 | 17 | +4 | 6 | Qualified to 2013 FIH Junior World Cup |
| 5 | Belgium | 5 | 2 | 1 | 2 | 7 | 3 | +4 | 7 | Qualified to 2013 FIH Junior World Cup |
| 6 | France | 5 | 1 | 1 | 3 | 4 | 11 | −7 | 4 | |
| 7 | Poland | 5 | 1 | 1 | 3 | 6 | 23 | −17 | 4 | Relegated to 2014 EuroHockey Junior Championship II |
| 8 | Belarus | 5 | 0 | 1 | 4 | 2 | 29 | −27 | 1 | Relegated to 2014 EuroHockey Junior Championship II |

Source: EuroHockey
(H) Hosts

=== Goalscorers ===
There were 106 goals scored in 20 matches, for an average of 5.3 goals per match.

14 goals

- (Netherlands) Lieke van Wijk

11 goals

- (Netherlands) Roos Drost

8 goals

- (Germany) Marilena Krauss
- (Netherlands) Charlotte Vega

4 goals

- (England) Joanne Hunter
- (Germany) Nina Notman
- (Germany) Hanna Schniewind

3 goals

- (Belgium) Louise Versavel
- (Netherlands) Valerie Magis
- (Netherlands) Stéphanie van der Raad
- (Netherlands) Samantha Saxton
- (Netherlands) Sabine van Silfhout
- (Spain) Lola Riera

2 goals

- (Belarus) Krystsina Kliashchuk
- (Belgium) Silke Steenackers
- (England) Shona McCallin
- (France) Alix Perrocheau
- (Germany) Lena Andersch
- (Spain) Carmen Cano

1 goal

- (Belgium) Pauline Leclef
- (Belgium) Anne-Sophie Weyns
- (England) Emily Atkinson
- (England) Emily Defroand
- (England) Josie Inverdale
- (England) Lily Owsley
- (France) Marie Billore
- (France) Morgane Huvelle
- (Germany) Helena Faust
- (Germany) Rebecca Grote
- (Germany) Viola Scharf
- (Netherlands) Marloes Keetels
- (Netherlands) Malou Pheninckx
- (Netherlands) Renske Siersema
- (Poland) Martyna Gabara
- (Poland) Adrianna Marcinkowska
- (Poland) Małgorzata Sztybrych
- (Poland) Oriana Wałasek
- (Poland) Joanna Wittke
- (Poland) Magdalena Zagajska
- (Spain) Berta Bonastre
- (Spain) Marta Bosque
- (Spain) Alicia Magaz
