= 2013 Women's Hockey Junior World Cup =

Tournament details
- Host country: Germany
- City: Mönchengladbach
- Dates: 27 July – 4 August
- Teams: 16 (from 5 confederations)
- Venue: Warsteiner HockeyPark

Final positions
- Champions: Netherlands (3rd title)
- Runner-up: Argentina
- Third place: India

Tournament statistics
- Matches played: 48
- Goals scored: 239 (4.98 per match)
- Top scorer: (Netherlands) Lieke van Wijk (14 goals)
- Best player: (India) Rani Rampal

The 2013 Women's Hockey Junior World Cup was the seventh edition of the Women's Hockey Junior World Cup, held from 27 July to 4 August 2013 in Mönchengladbach, Germany.

Defending champions the Netherlands won the tournament for a record third time after defeating Argentina 4–2 in the final on a penalty shootout after a 1–1 draw. India won the third place match by defeating England 3–2 on a penalty shootout after a 1–1 draw to claim their first ever Junior World Cup medal.

== Qualification ==
Each continental federation received a number of quotas depending on the FIH World Rankings for teams qualified through their junior continental championships. Alongside the host nation, 16 teams competed in the tournament.

Dates	Event	Location	Qualifier(s)
Host nation			Germany
27 June – 7 July 2012	2012 Junior Asia Cup	Bangkok, Thailand	China; India; South Korea
15–21 July 2012	2012 EuroHockey Junior Nations Championship II	Aleksin, Russia	Russia^{1}
26 August – 1 September 2012	2012 EuroHockey Junior Championship	's-Hertogenbosch, Netherlands	Netherlands; Spain; England; Belgium
10–22 September 2012	2012 Pan American Junior Championship	Guadalajara, Mexico	Argentina; Canada; United States
13–21 October 2012	2012 Junior Africa Cup for Nations	Randburg, South Africa	South Africa; Ghana
25 February – 3 March 2013	2013 Junior Oceania Cup	Gold Coast, Australia	Australia^{2} New Zealand^{2}

^1 – France withdrew from participating. As the first reserve team was previously assigned to the European Federation, Russia took their place as winners of the 2012 EuroHockey Junior Nations Championship II.
^2 – Australia and New Zealand qualified automatically due to the lack of other competing teams in the Oceania qualifier.

== First round ==
All times are Central European Summer Time (UTC+02:00)

=== Pool A ===
Pos	Team	Pld	W	D	L	GF	GA	GD	Pts	Qualification
1	Netherlands	3	3	0	0	17	1	+16	9	Quarter-finals
2	United States	3	2	0	1	11	6	+5	6	Quarter-finals
3	South Korea	3	1	0	2	10	6	+4	3	
4	Ghana	3	0	0	3	0	25	−25	0	

Source: FIH
Rules for classification: 1) points; 2) goal difference; 3) goals scored; 4) head-to-head result.

27 July 2013
11:30

United States	4–1	South Korea
Vittese 30', 60'; Dessoye 48'; Bozek 57'	Report	Cheon 59'

Umpires:
Hannah Sanders (ENG)
Valentina Tomasi (ITA)

27 July 2013
12:00

Netherlands	10–0	Ghana
Van Wijk 10', 46', 50', 52', 67'; De Lange 26', 44'; Scheerlinck 38', 53'; Siersema 61'	Report

Umpires:
Melanie Oakden (NZL)
Chen Hong (CHN)

28 July 2013
12:30

South Korea	9–0	Ghana
Kim H. 2', 6', 38'; Cheon 3', 24'; Lee Y. 32'; 34'; Kang 68'; Song 70+'	Report

Umpires:
Gaby Schmitz (GER)
Sarah Wilson (SCO)

28 July 2013
13:00

Netherlands	5–1	United States
Van Wijk 2', 19', 42'; Saxton 28'; Keetels 70'	Report	Vittese 45'

Umpires:
Irene Presenqui (ARG)
Emi Yamada (JPN)

30 July 2013
11:30

Ghana	0–6	United States
	Report	Parsley 9'; Bolles 14'; Johnson 26'; Holland 55'; Gebhart 67'; Wold 68'

Umpires:
Ayanna McClean (TRI)
Valentina Tomasi (ITA)

30 July 2013
12:00

South Korea	0–2	Netherlands
	Report	Verschoor 3'; De Lange 48'

Umpires:
Liu Xiaoying (CHN)
Melanie Oakden (NZL)

=== Pool B ===
Pos	Team	Pld	W	D	L	GF	GA	GD	Pts	Qualification
1	Argentina	3	2	1	0	9	3	+6	7	Quarter-finals
2	South Africa	3	1	2	0	12	9	+3	5	Quarter-finals
3	China	3	1	1	1	5	6	−1	4	
4	Canada	3	0	0	3	4	12	−8	0	

Source: FIH
Rules for classification: 1) points; 2) goal difference; 3) goals scored; 4) head-to-head result.

27 July 2013
09:00

Argentina	4–0	Canada
A. Habif 4'; Werthein 15', 35'; Albertario 62'	Report

Umpires:
Amber Church (NZL)
Sarah Wilson (SCO)

27 July 2013
09:30

South Africa	3–3	China
Lategan 41'; Brand 56'; Bobbs 70+'	Report	Sun 23'; Liu M. 32'; Zhang J. 51'

Umpires:
Fanneke Alkemade (NED)
Maggie Giddens (USA)

28 July 2013
10:00

Argentina	3–3	South Africa
Albertario 10', 30'; Granatto 12'	Report	Walraven 2'; Brand 24'; Britz 66'

Umpires:
Kylie Seymour (AUS)
Vilma Bagdanskiene (LTU)

28 July 2013
10:30

China	2–1	Canada
Liu Y. 37'; Gu 69'	Report	Karringten 44'

Umpires:
Aleesha Unka (NZL)
Annelize Rostron (RSA)

30 July 2013
14:30

Canada	3–6	South Africa
Randhawa 28'; Norlander 49'; Stewart 57'	Report	du Plessis 19'; Walraven 37', 46'; Jones 48'; Brand 55'; Bobbs 69'

Umpires:
Stephanie Judefind (USA)
Hannah Sanders (ENG)

30 July 2013
14:30

China	0–2	Argentina
	Report	Gomes Fantasia 8', 67'

Umpires:
Michelle Joubert (RSA)
Sarah Wilson (SCO)

=== Pool C ===
Pos	Team	Pld	W	D	L	GF	GA	GD	Pts	Qualification
1	Australia	3	2	1	0	15	4	+11	7	Quarter-finals
2	India	3	2	0	1	13	7	+6	6	Quarter-finals
3	New Zealand	3	1	1	1	13	5	+8	4	
4	Russia	3	0	0	3	1	26	−25	0	

Source: FIH
Rules for classification: 1) points; 2) goal difference; 3) goals scored; 4) head-to-head result.

27 July 2013
14:45

New Zealand	10–0	Russia
Fremaux 2', 52'; Symes 8'; Neal 28', 34'; Goad 30'; Cocks 36', 55'; Tanner 47'; Storey 70+'	Report

Umpires:
Annelize Rostron (RSA)
Emi Yamada (JPN)

27 July 2013
15:45

India	1–6	Australia
Barla 27'	Report	Slattery 17'; Allendorf 19'; Fitzpatrick 31'; Peris 41', 69'; Flanagan 46'

Umpires:
Michelle Joubert (RSA)
Ayana McClean (TRI)

28 July 2013
15:00

New Zealand	0–2	India
	Report	Manjit 45'; Katariya 51'

Umpires:
Hannah Sanders (ENG)
Kang Hyun-Hee (KOR)

28 July 2013
15:30

Australia	6–0	Russia
Fitzpatrick 2', 31', 52'; Allendorf 8'; Slattery 25'; E. Smith 35'	Report

Umpires:
Stephanie Judefind (USA)
Valentina Tomasi (ITA)

30 July 2013
09:00

Russia	1–10	India
Miroshnikova 36'	Report	Katariya 7', 15', 31'; Poonam 22', 27'; Rampal 39', 49'; Arya 44'; 66'; Manjit 69'

Umpires:
Chen Hong (CHN)
Maggie Giddens (USA)

30 July 2013
09:30

Australia	3–3	New Zealand
Fitzpatrick 19'; Allendorf 49'; Flanagan 67'	Report	Dennison 25'; Reid 37', 69'

Umpires:
Vilma Bagdanskiene (LTU)
Irene Presenqui (ARG)

=== Pool D ===
Pos	Team	Pld	W	D	L	GF	GA	GD	Pts	Qualification
1	Spain	3	2	1	0	10	2	+8	7	Quarter-finals
2	England	3	2	0	1	10	7	+3	6	Quarter-finals
3	Germany (H)	3	1	1	1	9	5	+4	4	
4	Belgium	3	0	0	3	2	17	−15	0	

Source: FIH
Rules for classification: 1) points; 2) goal difference; 3) goals scored; 4) head-to-head result.
(H) Hosts

27 July 2013
16:30

England	0–5	Spain
	Report	Ca. Salvatella 5', 19'; Maraña 39'; Bonastre 40'; Tost 59'

Umpires:
Kylie Seymour (AUS)
Aleesha Unka (NZL)

27 July 2013
18:15

Belgium	1–6	Germany
Steenackers 35'	Report	Stöckel 7'; Gonnermann 16'; Knuepfer 24', 43'; Grote 38'; Krauss 50'

Umpires:
Stephanie Judefind (USA)
Kang Hyun-Hee (KOR)

28 July 2013
17:30

England	8–1	Belgium
Chilton 6', 42'; Defroand 25', 55'; McCallin 26'; Inverdale 32'; Martin 35+'; Addison 64'	Report	Wouters 53'

Umpires:
Maggie Giddens (USA)
Melanie Oakden (NZL)

28 July 2013
18:00

Germany	2–2	Spain
Knuepfer 6'; Krauss 41'	Report	Bonastre 28'; Ca. Salvatella 48'

Umpires:
Amber Church (NZL)
Liu Xiaoying (CHN)

30 July 2013
16:30

Spain	3–0	Belgium
Guinea 9'; Maraña 19'; Magaz 62'	Report

Umpires:
Gaby Schmitz (GER)
Kylie Seymour (AUS)

30 July 2013
17:00

Germany	1–2	England
Krauss 24'	Report	31'; Addison 57'

Umpires:
Fanneke Alkemade (NED)
Annelize Rostron (RSA)

== Classification round ==
=== Bracket ===
Placement
1 August
South Korea	3
Canada	1
1 August
Germany	4
Russia	2
1 August
China	3
Ghana	1
1 August
New Zealand	7
Belgium	3

Cross-overs
2 August
South Korea	2
Germany	3
3 August
China	1
New Zealand	4

Ninth place
4 August
Germany	1
New Zealand	2
Eleventh place
4 August
South Korea	4
China	0

=== Placement finals ===
1 August 2013
09:00

South Korea	3–1	Canada
Kim H. 15'; Cho H. 62'; Cha 63'	Report	Norlander 48'

Umpires:
Irene Presenqui (ARG)
Liu Xiaoying (CHN)

1 August 2013
11:30

China	3–1	Ghana
Zhang J. 12'; Ou 33'; Zhang X. 48'	Report	Darko 10'

Umpires:
Gaby Schmitz (GER)
Fanneke Alkemade (NED)

1 August 2013
14:00

Germany	4–2	Russia
Scharf 11'; Stapenhorst 29'; Knuepfer 31'; Grote 67'	Report	Guseva 28'; Miroshnikova 52'

Umpires:
Kang Hyun-Hee (KOR)
Emi Yamada (JPN)

1 August 2013
16:30

New Zealand	7–3	Belgium
Symes 6', 31'; Reid 14'; Neal 23', 37'; Curtis 42'; Keddell 67'	Report	De Paeuw 48'; Wouters 49'; Puvrez 65'

Umpires:
Vilma Bagdanskiene (LTU)
Chen Hong (CHN)

=== Thirteenth to sixteenth place classification ===
Cross-overs
2 August
Canada	5
Russia	1
3 August
Ghana	1 (3)
Belgium (s.o.)	1 (4)

Thirteenth place
4 August
Canada	1 (1)
Belgium (s.o.)	1 (2)
Fifteenth place
4 August
Russia (s.o.)	1 (3)
Ghana	1 (1)

==== Cross-overs ====
2 August 2013
11:30

Canada	5–1	Russia
Johansen 8'; Buttinger 21'; Karringten 44', 59', 61'	Report	51'

Umpires:
Ayanna McClean (TRI)
Gaby Schmitz (GER)

3 August 2013
10:30

Ghana	1–1	Belgium
Shaibu 35'	Report	Leclef 27'
Penalties
Umaru (penalty shoot-out scored); Fosuaa (penalty shoot-out missed); Boakye (penalty shoot-out missed); Amoako (penalty shoot-out scored); Opuku (penalty shoot-out scored) —— Umaru (penalty shoot-out missed)	3–4	(penalty shoot-out scored) Steenackers; (penalty shoot-out scored) Puvrez; (penalty shoot-out scored) Leclef; (penalty shoot-out missed) Meyvis; (penalty shoot-out missed) Weyns —— (penalty shoot-out scored) Steenackers

Umpires:
Kang Hyun-Hee (KOR)
Ayanna McClean (TRI)

==== Fifteenth and sixteenth place ====
4 August 2013
08:00

Russia	1–1	Ghana
Kondratyeva 47'	Report	Opuku 9'
Penalties
Guseva (penalty shoot-out scored); Salamatina (penalty shoot-out scored); Miroshnikova (penalty shoot-out scored); Kondratyeva (penalty shoot-out missed)	3–1	(penalty shoot-out missed) Umaru; (penalty shoot-out scored) Amoako; (penalty shoot-out missed) Opuku; (penalty shoot-out missed) Danquah

Umpires:
Valentina Tomasi (ITA)
Chen Hong (CHN)

==== Thirteenth and fourteenth place ====
4 August 2013
10:30

Canada	1–1	Belgium
Randhawa 28'	Report	Leclef 27'
Penalties
Secco (penalty shoot-out missed); Haughn (penalty shoot-out missed); Karringten (penalty shoot-out scored); Sourisseau (penalty shoot-out missed); Donohoe (penalty shoot-out missed)	1–2	(penalty shoot-out missed) Meyvis; (penalty shoot-out scored) Steenackers; (penalty shoot-out scored) Wouters; (penalty shoot-out missed) Puvrez; (penalty shoot-out missed) Leclef

Umpires:
Emi Yamada (JPN)
Melanie Oakden (NZL)

=== Ninth to twelfth place classification ===
==== Cross-overs ====
2 August 2013
12:00

South Korea	2–3	Germany
Cheon 24'; Lee Y. 26'	Report	Oldhafer 2', 22'; Krauss 28'

Umpires:
Vilma Bagdanskiene (LTU)
Aleesha Unka (NZL)

3 August 2013
13:00

China	1–4	New Zealand
Liu Y. 61'	Report	King 25'; Fremaux 26'; Symes 50'; Keddell 58'

Umpires:
Valentina Tomasi (ITA)
Emi Yamada (JPN)

==== Eleventh and twelfth place ====
4 August 2013
13:00

South Korea	4–0	China
Kim H. 8'; Kang 9', 70'; Cheon 37'	Report

Umpires:
Gaby Schmitz (GER)
Maggie Giddens (USA)

==== Ninth and tenth place ====
4 August 2013
15:30

Germany	1–2	New Zealand
Grote 43'	Report	Curtis 6'; Goad 37'

Umpires:
Fanneke Alkemade (NED)
Liu Xiaoying (CHN)

== Medal round ==
=== Bracket ===
Quarter-finals
1 August
Netherlands	9
South Africa	1
1 August
Spain	2
India	4
1 August
Argentina	2
United States	0
1 August
Australia	0
England	1

Semi-finals
2 August
Netherlands	3
India	0
2 August
Argentina	3
England	0

Final
4 August
Netherlands (s.o.)	1 (4)
Argentina	1 (2)
Third place
4 August
India (s.o.)	1 (3)
England	1 (2)

=== Quarter-finals ===
1 August 2013
09:30

Spain	2–4	India
Giné 7'; Bonastre 30'	Report	Monika 10'; Navneet 34'; Katariya 41'; Rampal 48'

Umpires:
Michelle Joubert (RSA)
Annelize Rostron (RSA)

1 August 2013
12:00

Argentina	2–0	United States
Gomes Fantasia 35'; Werthein 60'	Report

Umpires:
Kylie Seymour (AUS)
Aleesha Unka (NZL)

1 August 2013
14:30

Australia	0–1	England
	Report	Balsdon 26'

Umpires:
Amber Church (NZL)
Stephanie Judefind (USA)

1 August 2013
17:00

Netherlands	9–1	South Africa
Van Wijk 11', 15', 40', 42'; De Lange 19', 63'; De Waard 34'; Verschoor 55'; Saxton 57'	Report	Marks 3'

Umpires:
Hannah Sanders (ENG)
Sarah Wilson (SCO)

=== Fifth to eighth place classification ===
Cross-overs
2 August
South Africa	1
Spain	3
2 August
United States	1
Australia	4

Fifth place
4 August
Spain	1
Australia	0
Seventh place
4 August
South Africa	2
United States	4

==== Cross-overs ====
2 August 2013
14:00

United States	1–4	Australia
Vittese 55'	Report	E. Smith 16'; Khoury 51'; Allendorf 67'; Flanagan 70'

Umpires:
Fanneke Alkemade (NED)
Liu Xiaoying (CHN)

2 August 2013
16:30

South Africa	1–3	Spain
Bobbs 47'	Report	Bosque 53', 55'; Guinea 57'

Umpires:
Maggie Giddens (USA)
Melanie Oakden (NZL)

==== Seventh and eighth place ====
4 August 2013
08:30

South Africa	2–4	United States
Walraven 29'; Glasby 69'	Report	Bolles 15'; Gebhart 33'; Parsley 60'; Bozek 68'

Umpires:
Hannah Sanders (ENG)
Vilma Bagdanskiene (LTU)

==== Fifth and sixth place ====
4 August 2013
11:00

Spain	1–0	Australia
Guinea 23'	Report

Umpires:
Sarah Wilson (SCO)
Annelize Rostron (RSA)

=== First to fourth place classification ===
==== Semi-finals ====
2 August 2013
14:30

Argentina	3–0	England
Cedrés 13', 40'; Gomes Fantasia 64'	Report

Umpires:
Michelle Joubert (RSA)
Stephanie Judefind (USA)

2 August 2013
17:00

Netherlands	3–0	India
Van Wijk 17'; De Lange 57'; Scheerlinck 68'	Report

Umpires:
Irene Presenqui (ARG)
Amber Church (NZL)

==== Third and fourth place ====
4 August 2013
13:30

India	1–1	England
Rampal 13'	Report	Toman 55'
Penalties
Rampal (penalty shoot-out scored); Navjot (penalty shoot-out missed); Vandana (penalty shoot-out missed); Navneet (penalty shoot-out missed); Poonam (penalty shoot-out missed); Rampal (penalty shoot-out scored); Poonam (penalty shoot-out missed); Navneet (penalty shoot-out scored)	3–2	(penalty shoot-out missed) Toman; (penalty shoot-out missed) Leigh; (penalty shoot-out missed) McCallin; (penalty shoot-out missed) Hyams; (penalty shoot-out scored) Defroand; (penalty shoot-out scored) Defroand; (penalty shoot-out missed) McCallin; (penalty shoot-out missed) Toman

Umpires:
Irene Presenqui (ARG)
Aleesha Unka (NZL)

==== Final ====
4 August 2013
16:00

Netherlands	1–1	Argentina
Van Wijk 32'	Report	Cedrés 66'
Penalties
Keetels (penalty shoot-out scored); Jaspers (penalty shoot-out scored); Verschoor (penalty shoot-out scored); Leurink (penalty shoot-out scored)	4–2	(penalty shoot-out scored) F. Habif; (penalty shoot-out scored) Gomes Fantasia; (penalty shoot-out missed) Granatto; (penalty shoot-out missed) Cedrés

Umpires:
Michelle Joubert (RSA)
Kylie Seymour (AUS)

== Awards ==
Player of the Tournament	Top Goalscorer	Goalkeeper of the Tournament
(India) Rani Rampal	(Netherlands) Lieke van Wijk	(Argentina) Sofia Montserrat

== Statistics ==
=== Final ranking ===
As per statistical convention in field hockey, matches decided in extra time are counted as wins and losses, while matches decided by penalty shoot-outs are counted as draws.

Pos	Team	Pld	W	D	L	GF	GA	GD	Pts	Final result
1st place, gold medalist(s)	Netherlands	6	5	1	0	30	3	+27	16	Gold Medal
2nd place, silver medalist(s)	Argentina	6	4	2	0	15	4	+11	14	Silver Medal
3rd place, bronze medalist(s)	India	6	3	1	2	18	13	+5	10	Bronze Medal
4	England	6	3	1	2	12	11	+1	10	Fourth place
5	Spain	6	4	1	1	16	7	+9	13	Eliminated in Quarter-finals
6	Australia	6	3	1	2	19	7	+12	10	Eliminated in Quarter-finals
7	United States	6	3	0	3	16	14	+2	9	Eliminated in Quarter-finals
8	South Africa	6	1	2	3	16	25	−9	5	Eliminated in Quarter-finals
9	New Zealand	6	4	1	1	26	10	+16	13	Eliminated in group stage
10	Germany	6	3	1	2	17	11	+6	10	Eliminated in group stage
11	South Korea	6	3	0	3	19	10	+9	9	Eliminated in group stage
12	China	6	2	1	3	9	15	−6	7	Eliminated in group stage
13	Belgium	6	0	2	4	7	26	−19	2	Eliminated in group stage
14	Canada	6	1	1	4	11	16	−5	4	Eliminated in group stage
15	Russia	6	0	1	5	5	36	−31	1	Eliminated in group stage
16	Ghana	6	0	2	4	3	30	−27	2	Eliminated in group stage

Source: FIH

=== Goalscorers ===
There were 239 goals scored in 48 matches, for an average of 4.98 goals per match.

14 goals

- (Netherlands) Lieke van Wijk

6 goals

- (Netherlands) Lisanne de Lange

5 goals

- (Australia) Madison Fitzpatrick
- (India) Vandana Katariya
- (South Korea) Kim Hyun-Ji
- (South Korea) Cheon Eun-Bi

4 goals

- (Argentina) Julia Gomes Fantasia
- (Australia) Murphy Allendorf
- (Canada) Caashia Karringten
- (Germany) Sabine Kneupfer
- (Germany) Marilena Krauss
- (India) Rani Rampal
- (New Zealand) Brooke Neal
- (New Zealand) Philippa Symes
- (South Africa) Nicole Walraven
- (United States) Tara Vittese

3 goals

- (Argentina) Agustina Albertario
- (Argentina) Jimena Cedrés
- (Argentina) Roberta Werthein
- (Australia) Anna Flanagan
- (Germany) Rebecca Grote
- (Netherlands) Lisa Scheerlinck
- (New Zealand) Cassandra Reid
- (New Zealand) Sian Fremaux
- (South Africa) Suléke Brand
- (South Africa) Quanita Bobbs
- (South Korea) Kang Ji-Na
- (Spain) Berta Bonastre
- (Spain) Cristina Guinea
- (Spain) Carola Salvatella

2 goals

- (Australia) Brooke Peris
- (Australia) Kathryn Slattery
- (Australia) Emily Smith
- (Belgium) Pauline Leclef
- (Belgium) Axelle Wouters
- (Canada) Stephanie Norlander
- (Canada) Priya Randhawa
- (China) Zhang Jinrong
- (China) Liu Yuyue
- (England) Stephanie Addison
- (England) Olivia Chilton
- (England) Emily Defroand
- (Germany) Pia-Sophie Oldhafer
- (India) Manjit Kaur
- (India) Poonam Rani
- (Netherlands) Samantha Saxton
- (Netherlands) Maria Verschoor
- (New Zealand) Sophie Cocks
- (New Zealand) Michaela Curtis
- (New Zealand) Erin Goad
- (New Zealand) Rose Keddell
- (Russia) Anastasia Miroshnikova
- (South Korea) Lee Yu-Ri
- (Spain) Marta Bosque
- (Spain) Patricia Maraña
- (United States) Marie Elena Bolles
- (United States) Emma Bozek
- (United States) Laura Gerbhart
- (United States) Nikki Parsley

1 goal

- (Argentina) María Granatto
- (Argentina) Agustina Habif
- (Australia) Nina Khoury
- (Belgium) Julie de Paeuw
- (Belgium) Emma Puvrez
- (Belgium) Silke Steenackers
- (Canada) Jessica Buttinger
- (Canada) Karli Johansen
- (Canada) Holly Stewart
- (China) Gu Bingfeng
- (China) Sun Jing
- (China) Liu Meng
- (China) Zhang Xindan
- (China) Ou Zixia
- (England) Grace Balsdon
- (England) Josie Inverdale
- (England) Hannah Martin
- (England) Shona McCallin
- (England) Anna Toman
- (Germany) Jana Gonnermann
- (Germany) Charlotte Stapenhorst
- (Germany) Viola Scharf
- (Germany) Lea Stöckel
- (Ghana) Gloria Darko
- (Ghana) Elizabeth Opuku
- (Ghana) Queensilla Shaibu
- (India) Ritushi Kumani Arya
- (India) Anupa Barla
- (India) Navneet Kaur
- (India) Monika Malik
- (Netherlands) Xan de Waard
- (Netherlands) Marloes Keetels
- (Netherlands) Renske Siersema
- (New Zealand) Rhiannon Dennison
- (New Zealand) Julia King
- (New Zealand) Jenny Storey
- (New Zealand) Kim Tanner
- (Russia) Elena Guseva
- (Russia) Natalia Kondratyeva
- (South Africa) Tanya Britz
- (South Africa) Lilian du Plessis
- (South Africa) Tarryn Glasby
- (South Africa) Tiffany Jones
- (South Africa) Izelle Lategan
- (South Africa) Toni Marks
- (South Korea) Song Bo-Ram
- (South Korea) Cho Hye-Jin
- (South Korea) Cha Ye-Sol
- (Spain) Xantal Giné
- (Spain) Alicia Magaz
- (Spain) María Tost
- (United States) Anna Dessoye
- (United States) Georgia Holland
- (United States) Aileen Johnson
- (United States) Emily Wold

1 own goal

- England (against Germany)
- India (against Russia)
- Russia (against Canada)
- South Korea (against Ghana)

Source: FIH
