= 2017–18 Liga Iberdrola Hockey =

Liga Iberdrola
- Season: 2017–2018
- Dates: 23 September 2017 – 3 June 2018
- Champions: Real Sociedad (8th title)
- Regular season: Club de Campo
- Relegated: RC Jolaseta
- EuroHockey Champions Cup: Real Sociedad
- Matches played: 101
- Top goalscorer: Rebecca Grote (22 goals)

The 2017–18 Liga Iberdrola was the 81st season of the Liga Iberdrola, Spain's premier field hockey league for women. It began on 23 September 2017 and concluded with the championship final on 3 June 2018.

Club de Campo were the defending champions.

== Teams ==
Ten teams participated in the 2018–2019 edition of the Liga Iberdrola. UD Taburiente, which replaced CH Pozuelo, was promoted.

Team	Location	Province
Atlètic Terrassa	Terrassa	Barcelona
CD Terrassa	Terrassa	Barcelona
Club de Campo	Madrid	Madrid
Club Egara	Terrassa	Barcelona
Júnior	Barcelona	Barcelona
Real Club de Polo	Barcelona	Barcelona
Real Sociedad	San Sebastián	Gipuzkoa
Sanse Complutense	San Sebastián de los Reyes	Madrid
Taburiente	Las Palmas	Las Palmas
RC Jolaseta	Getxo	Biscay

== Results ==
=== Regular season ===
==== Table ====
Pos	Team	Pld	W	D	L	GF	GA	GD	Pts	Qualification
1	Club de Campo	18	16	2	0	71	13	+58	50	Quarterfinals
2	Real Club de Polo	18	12	3	3	33	19	+14	39	Quarterfinals
3	Sanse Complutense	18	10	6	2	41	23	+18	36	Quarterfinals
4	Júnior	18	9	4	5	25	12	+13	31	Quarterfinals
5	CD Terrassa	18	8	0	10	19	30	−11	24	Quarterfinals
6	Real Sociedad	18	4	4	10	19	25	−6	16	Quarterfinals
7	Club Egara	18	4	4	10	21	39	−18	16	Quarterfinals
8	Taburiente	18	3	7	8	16	34	−18	16	Quarterfinals
9	Atlètic Terrassa	18	3	4	11	16	46	−30	13	Relegation play–off
10	RC Jolaseta	18	2	4	12	14	34	−20	10	Relegated to 2018–19 Primera División

Source: Real Federación Española de Hockey
Rules for classification: 1) Points; 2) Goal difference; 3) Goals scored; 4) Games won; 5) Head-to-head.

==== Fixtures ====
Home \ Away	ATE	CDT	CDC	CEG	JÚN	RCJ	RCP	RSO	SCO	UDT
Atlètic Terrassa	—	0–2	0–5	1–1	0–3	1–1	0–2	2–1	1–2	2–0
CD Terrassa	2–1	—	1–4	0–1	2–1	2–0	0–1	1–0	1–2	2–1
Club de Campo	8–0	6–0	—	4–0	4–0	6–0	4–1	3–2	3–1	7–1
Club Egara	2–2	0–2	1–4	—	0–1	3–2	1–4	1–1	1–1	3–0
Júnior	3–0	2–0	1–3	0–1	—	1–0	0–0	1–0	1–1	6–0
RC Jolaseta	1–1	0–1	1–2	2–1	0–1	—	1–2	0–0	1–2	1–1
Real Club de Polo	3–1	4–0	0–2	4–2	1–0	3–1	—	1–0	1–1	1–1
Real Sociedad	1–2	2–0	2–2	2–1	0–4	4–0	5–2	—	1–3	2–1
Sanse Complutense	7–2	3–2	1–3	7–1	0–0	1–0	0–1	2–1	—	1–1
Taburiente	2–0	2–1	1–1	2–1	0–0	2–3	0–2	0–0	1–1	—

Source: Real Federación Española de Hockey
Legend: Blue = home team win; Yellow = draw; Red = away team win.

=== Play–offs ===
Quarter-finals
26–27 May 2019
Club de Campo	3	4
Taburiente	1	0
26–27 May 2019
Júnior	3	1
CD Terrassa	0	1
26–27 May 2019
Sanse Complutense	2	2
Real Sociedad	1	4
26–27 May 2019
Real Club de Polo	2	1
Club Egara	1	1

Semi-finals
2 June 2019
Club de Campo	0
Júnior	1
2 June 2019
Real Sociedad (pen.)	0 (4)
Real Club de Polo	0 (3)

Final
3 June 2019
Júnior	1 (0)
Real Sociedad (pen.)	1 (3)

==== Quarter-finals ====
Team 1	Agg.	Team 2	1st leg	2nd leg
Club de Campo	2–0	Taburiente	3–1	4–0
Real Club de Polo	1–0	Club Egara	2–1	1–1
Sanse Complutense	1–1	Real Sociedad	2–1	2–4
Júnior	1–0	CD Terrassa	3–0	1–1

26 May 2018
13:00

Club de Campo	3–1	Taburiente
García 8'; Grote 20'; Pérez 26'	Report	Omara 3'

Club de Campo, Madrid
Umpires:
Álvaro López (ESP)
María Mercedes Romero (ESP)

27 May 2018
13:00

Club de Campo	4–0	Taburiente
García 6', 26', 36'; Sánchez 60'	Report

Club de Campo, Madrid
Umpires:
Carlos García (ESP)
Álvaro López (ESP)

Club de Campo won the series 2–0.

26 May 2018
13:00

Real Club de Polo	2–1	Club Egara
Segú 19'; Giné 65'	Report	Domingo 69'

RC de Polo, Barcelona
Umpires:
Pilar López (ESP)
Laura Trujillo (ESP)

27 May 2018
12:30

Real Club de Polo	1–1	Club Egara
Cerruti 69'	Report	Domingo 8'

RC de Polo, Barcelona
Umpires:
Laura Trujillo (ESP)
Pilar López (ESP)

Real Club de Polo won the series 1–0.

26 May 2018
13:00

Sanse Complutense	2–1	Real Sociedad
Riera 65'; Bruni 69'	Report	Altuna 34'

SPV Complutense, San Sebastián de los Reyes
Umpires:
Gema Calderón (ESP)
Cristina Pérez (ESP)

27 May 2018
13:00

Sanse Complutense	2–4	Real Sociedad
Riera 9', 68'	Report	González 24'; N. Belzunegi 32', 42'; Altuna 58'

SPV Complutense, San Sebastián de los Reyes
Umpires:
María Mercedes Romero (ESP)
Gema Calderón (ESP)

Real Sociedad won the series 5–4 on aggregate, after the series finished 1–1.

26 May 2018
12:30

Júnior	3–0	CD Terrassa
García 16', 50'; M. Serrahima 59'	Report

Júnior Club 1917, Barcelona
Umpires:
Núria Ribo (ESP)
Naiara Rodríguez (ESP)

27 May 2018
12:30

Júnior	1–1	CD Terrassa
M. Serrahima 43'	Report	Villoro 29'

Júnior Club 1917, Barcelona
Umpires:
Guillen Ramál (ESP)
Núria Ribo (ESP)

Júnior won the series 1–0.

==== Semi-finals ====
2 June 2018
11:00

Club de Campo	0–1	Júnior
	Report	Gil 70'

RC de Polo, Barcelona
Umpires:
Pilar López (ESP)
Núria Ribo (ESP)

2 June 2018
13:00

Real Sociedad	0–0	Real Club de Polo
	Report
Penalties
González (penalty shoot-out scored); Maraña (penalty shoot-out scored); Altuna (penalty shoot-out missed); Mirabella (penalty shoot-out scored); Pacella (penalty shoot-out scored)	4–3	(penalty shoot-out scored) Giné; (penalty shoot-out scored) Sanguinetti; (penalty shoot-out scored) Maldonado; (penalty shoot-out missed) Segú; (penalty shoot-out missed) Piñeiro

RC de Polo, Barcelona
Umpires:
Gema Calderón (ESP)
María Mercedes Romero (ESP)

==== Final ====
3 June 2018
13:00

Júnior	1–1	Real Sociedad
Guinea 17'	Report	Altuna 60'
Penalties
García (penalty shoot-out missed); Petchamé (penalty shoot-out missed); Ma. Grau (penalty shoot-out missed)	0–3	(penalty shoot-out scored) Altuna; (penalty shoot-out scored) González; (penalty shoot-out scored) Mirabella

RC de Polo, Barcelona
Umpires:
Núria Ribo (ESP)
Gema Calderón (ESP)

== Top goalscorers ==
Pos.	Player	Nationality	Team	Goals
1	Rebecca Grote	Germany	Club de Campo	22
2	Lola Riera	Spain	Sanse Complutense	16
3	Carmen Cano	Spain	Club de Campo	14
4	Begoña García	Spain	Club de Campo	12
5	Antonella Bruni	Italy	Sanse Complutense	9
5	Marta Segú	Spain	Real Club de Polo	9
7	Anna Gil	Spain	Júnior	8
7	Lucía Jiménez	Spain	Sanse Complutense	8
9	Patricia Maraña	Spain	Real Sociedad	7
9	Olalla Piñeiro	Spain	Real Club de Polo	7
