= 2015–16 División de Honor Femenina de Hockey Hierba =

División de Honor
- Season: 2015–2016
- Dates: 26 September 2015 – 28 May 2016
- Champions: Sanse Complutense (2nd title)
- Regular season: Sanse Complutense
- Relegated: UD Taburiente; Tenis
- EuroHockey Champions Cup: Sanse Complutense
- Matches played: 101
- Top goalscorer: Patricia Maraña; Lola Riera (19 goals)

The 2015–16 División de Honor was the 79th season of the División de Honor, Spain's premier field hockey league for women. It began on 24 September 2016 and concluded on 20 May 2017.

Club de Campo were the defending champions.

== Teams ==
A total of 10 teams participated in the 2015–2016 edition of the División de Honor. The promoted teams was CD Terrassa and RC Jolaseta, who replaced Atlètic Terrassa and Universidad de Sevilla.

Team	Location	Province
CD Terrassa	Terrassa	Barcelona
Club de Campo	Madrid	Madrid
Club Egara	Terrassa	Barcelona
Júnior	Barcelona	Barcelona
RC Jolaseta	Getxo	Biscay
Real Club de Polo	Barcelona	Barcelona
Real Sociedad	San Sebastián	Gipuzkoa
Sanse Complutense	San Sebastián de los Reyes	Madrid
Tenis	Santander	Cantabria
UD Taburiente	Las Palmas de Gran Canaria	Las Palmas

== Results ==
=== Regular season ===
==== Table ====
Pos	Team	Pld	W	D	L	GF	GA	GD	Pts	Qualification
1	Sanse Complutense	18	15	1	2	49	13	+36	46	Quarterfinals
2	Club de Campo	18	13	4	1	40	10	+30	43	Quarterfinals
3	Júnior	18	13	2	3	39	15	+24	41	Quarterfinals
4	Real Sociedad	18	9	4	5	35	15	+20	31	Quarterfinals
5	Club Egara	18	8	3	7	21	27	−6	27	Quarterfinals
6	CD Terrassa	18	7	1	10	24	29	−5	22	Quarterfinals
7	Real Club de Polo	18	4	4	10	17	31	−14	16	Quarterfinals
8	RC Jolaseta	18	3	2	13	8	49	−41	11	Quarterfinals
9	Tenis	18	1	7	10	15	37	−22	10	Relegated to 2016–17 Primera División
10	UD Taburiente	18	0	6	12	10	32	−22	6	Relegated to 2016–17 Primera División

Source: Real Federación Española de Hockey
Rules for classification: 1) Points; 2) Goal difference; 3) Goals scored; 4) Games won; 5) Head-to-head.

=== Play–offs ===
Quarter-finals
7–8 May 2016
Sanse Complutense	10	4
RC Jolaseta	1	1
7–8 May 2016
Real Sociedad	2	5
Club Egara	0	2
7–8 May 2016
Júnior	2	2
CD Terrassa	0	1
7–8 May 2016
Club de Campo	3	4
Real Club de Polo	2	0

Semi-finals
27 May 2016
Sanse Complutense	2
Real Sociedad	0
27 May 2016
Júnior	0
Club de Campo	1

Final
28 May 2016
Sanse Complutense (pen.)	0 (4)
Club de Campo	0 (3)

==== Quarter-finals ====
Team 1	Agg.	Team 2	1st leg	2nd leg
Sanse Complutense	2–0	RC Jolaseta	10–1	4–1
Club de Campo	2–0	Real Club de Polo	3–2	4–0
Júnior	2–0	CD Terrassa	2–0	2–1
Real Sociedad	2–0	Club Egara	2–0	5–2

7 May 2016
13:00

Sanse Complutense	10–1	RC Jolaseta
Riera 13', 16', 31', 40'; Jiménez 17', 25'; Lorenzo 34', 50', 53', 54'	Report	González 24'

SPV Complutense, San Sebastián de los Reyes
Umpires:
Salvador González (ESP)
Paul Salvati (ESP)

8 May 2016
12:30

Sanse Complutense	4–1	RC Jolaseta
Jiménez 8'; Martín 28'; García 32', 42'	Report	Viarengo 13'

SPV Complutense, San Sebastián de los Reyes
Umpires:
Daniel Rodríguez (ESP)
Salvador González (ESP)

Sanse Complutense won the series 2–0.

7 May 2016
13:00

Club de Campo	3–2	Real Club de Polo
Cano 9'; Iglesias 17'; Magaz 24'	Report	Conill 44'; Cesanelli 55'

Club de Campo, Madrid
Umpires:
Pilar López (ESP)
Gema Calderón (ESP)

8 May 2016
11:00

Club de Campo	4–0	Real Club de Polo
Iglesias 2', 33'; Cano 31', 46'	Report

Club de Campo, Madrid
Umpires:
Carlos Vera (ESP)
Pilar López (ESP)

Club de Campo won the series 2–0.

7 May 2016
13:00

Júnior	2–0	CD Terrassa
Gil 9'; Petchamé 18'	Report

Júnior Club 1917, Barcelona
Umpires:
Nayra Rodríguez (ESP)
Jonathan Gómez (ESP)

8 May 2016
12:30

Júnior	2–1	CD Terrassa
Petchamé 2'; Gil 26'	Report	Gabarró 35'

Júnior Club 1917, Barcelona
Umpires:
Jonathan Gómez (ESP)
Nayra Rodríguez (ESP)

Júnior won the series 2–0.

7 May 2016
13:00

Real Sociedad	2–0	Club Egara
N. Belzenegui 20'; Pacella 40'	Report

Real Sociedad, San Sebastián
Umpires:
Carmen Gardé (ESP)
Diego Estebánez (ESP)

8 May 2016
13:00

Real Sociedad	5–2	Club Egara
N. Belzenegui 12'; Maraña 14', 57'; Siemer 21'; Sánchez 60'	Report	A. Fito 9', 15'

Real Sociedad, San Sebastián
Umpires:
Diego Estebánez (ESP)
Carmen Gardé (ESP)

Real Sociedad won the series 2–0.

==== Semi-finals ====
27 May 2016
17:00

Sanse Complutense	2–0	Real Sociedad
García 25'; Rodríguez 40'	Report

Club de Campo, Madrid
Umpires:
María Mercedes Romero (ESP)
Sandra Adell (ESP)

27 May 2016
19:00

Júnior	0–1	Club de Campo
	Report	Pérez 53'

Club de Campo, Madrid
Umpires:
Gema Calderón (ESP)
Pilar López (ESP)

==== Final ====
28 May 2016
17:00

Sanse Complutense	0–0	Club de Campo
	Report
Penalties
Sánchez-Valverde (penalty shoot-out scored); García (penalty shoot-out scored); Jiménez (penalty shoot-out scored); Lorenzo (penalty shoot-out missed); Riera (penalty shoot-out scored)	4–3	(penalty shoot-out scored) Magaz; (penalty shoot-out scored) Pérez; (penalty shoot-out missed) Gil; (penalty shoot-out missed) López; (penalty shoot-out scored) Iglesias

Club de Campo, Madrid
Umpires:
Pilar López (ESP)
María Mercedes Romero (ESP)

== Top goalscorers ==
Pos.	Player	Nationality	Team	Goals
1	Patricia Maraña	Spain	Real Sociedad	19
1	Lola Riera	Spain	Sanse Complutense	19
3	Begoña García	Spain	Sanse Complutense	18
4	Carlota Petchamé	Spain	Júnior	11
5	Amparo Gil	Spain	Club de Campo	10
6	Belén Iglesias	Spain	Club de Campo	9
6	Cristina Lorenzo	Spain	Sanse Complutense	9
8	Lucía Jiménez	Spain	Sanse Complutense	8
9	Patricia Álvarez	Spain	Tenis	7
9	Anna Gil	Spain	Júnior	7
