= 2016–17 División de Honor Femenina de Hockey Hierba =

División de Honor
- Season: 2016–2017
- Dates: 24 September 2016 – 20 May 2017
- Champions: Club de Campo (20th title)
- Regular season: Club de Campo
- Relegated: RC Jolaseta
- EuroHockey Champions Cup: Club de Campo
- Matches played: 103
- Top goalscorer: Mariona Serrahima (22 goals)

The 2016–17 División de Honor was the 80th season of the División de Honor, Spain's premier field hockey league for women. It began on 24 September 2016 and concluded on 20 May 2017.

Sanse Complutense were the defending champions.

== Teams ==
A total of 10 teams participated in the 2016–2017 edition of the División de Honor. The promoted team was Atlètic Terrassa and CH Pozuelo, who replaced UD Taburiente and Tenis.

Team	Location	Province
Atlètic Terrassa	Terrassa	Barcelona
CD Terrassa	Terrassa	Barcelona
CH Pozuelo	Madrid	Madrid
Club de Campo	Madrid	Madrid
Club Egara	Terrassa	Barcelona
Júnior	Barcelona	Barcelona
RC Jolaseta	Getxo	Biscay
Real Club de Polo	Barcelona	Barcelona
Real Sociedad	San Sebastián	Gipuzkoa
Sanse Complutense	San Sebastián de los Reyes	Madrid

== Results ==
=== Regular season ===
==== Table ====
Pos	Team	Pld	W	D	L	GF	GA	GD	Pts	Qualification
1	Club de Campo	18	15	2	1	62	18	+44	47	Quarterfinals
2	Júnior	18	12	3	3	54	19	+35	39	Quarterfinals
3	Sanse Complutense	18	11	4	3	46	24	+22	37	Quarterfinals
4	Club Egara	18	8	4	6	32	29	+3	28	Quarterfinals
5	Real Sociedad	18	6	5	7	32	33	−1	23	Quarterfinals
6	Real Club de Polo	18	6	5	7	27	32	−5	23	Quarterfinals
7	CD Terrassa	18	6	4	8	24	28	−4	22	Quarterfinals
8	RC Jolaseta	18	4	3	11	22	42	−20	15	Quarterfinals
9	Atlètic Terrassa	18	3	1	14	18	57	−39	10	Relegation play–off
10	CH Pozuelo	18	2	3	13	18	53	−35	9	Relegated to 2017–18 Primera División

Source: Real Federación Española de Hockey
Rules for classification: 1) Points; 2) Goal difference; 3) Goals scored; 4) Games won; 5) Head-to-head.

=== Play–down ===
As the second placed team in the 2016–17 Primera División, Tenis played in a two-match relegation/promotion series against Atlètic Terrassa.

Team 1	Agg.	Team 2	1st leg	2nd leg
Atlètic Terrassa	2–0	Tenis	3–2	2–0

14 May 2017
12:00

Atlètic Terrassa	3–2	Tenis
A. Barba 14'; Bustos 22'; Escudé 54'	Report	Álvarez 13'; Buda 56'

Atlètic Terrassa HC, Terrassa
Umpires:
Andrés Ortíz (ESP)
Luís Martínez (ESP)

20 May 2017
13:00

Tenis	0–2	Atlètic Terrassa
	Report	Bustos 59'; Lozzia 68'

RS Tenis, Santander
Umpires:
Pilar López (ESP)
Gema Calderón (ESP)

=== Play–offs ===
Quarter-finals
6–7 May 2017
Club de Campo	2	3
RC Jolaseta	0	2
6–7 May 2017
Club Egara	1	1
Real Sociedad	2	2
6–7 May 2017
Sanse Complutense	5	1
Real Club de Polo	0	0
6–7 May 2017
Júnior (pen.)	3	0	(3)
CD Terrassa	1	2	(2)

Semi-finals
12 May 2017
Club de Campo	4
Real Sociedad	0
12 May 2017
Sanse Complutense	2
Júnior	3

Final
13 May 2017
Club de Campo	1
Júnior	0

==== Quarter-finals ====
Team 1	Agg.	Team 2	1st leg	2nd leg
Club de Campo	2–0	RC Jolaseta	2–0	3–2
Júnior	1–1 (3–2 pen.)	CD Terrassa	3–1	0–2
Sanse Complutense	2–0	Real Club de Polo	5–0	1–0
Club Egara	0–2	Real Sociedad	1–2	1–2

6 May 2017
11:00

Club de Campo	2–0	RC Jolaseta
Arrazola 19'; López 58'	Report

Club de Campo, Madrid
Umpires:
Daniel Rodríguez (ESP)
Concepción Hueltes (ESP)

7 May 2017
11:00

Club de Campo	3–2	RC Jolaseta
Gil 30'; Sánchez 41', 65'	Report	Turner 8'; Bruni 52'

Club de Campo, Madrid
Umpires:
Concepción Hueltes (ESP)
Daniel Rodríguez (ESP)

Club de Campo won the series 2–0.

6 May 2017
12:30

Júnior	3–1	CD Terrassa
Piris 17'; Serrahima 31'; Queralt 54'	Report	C. Ycart 34'

Júnior Club 1917, Barcelona
Umpires:
Gema Calderón (ESP)
Mariela Fernández (ESP)

7 May 2017
12:30

Júnior	0–2	CD Terrassa
	Report	Pons 35', 60'
Penalties
Petchamé (penalty shoot-out scored); Ma. Grau (penalty shoot-out missed); Serrahima (penalty shoot-out missed); Queralt (penalty shoot-out scored); Brugts (penalty shoot-out scored)	3–2	(penalty shoot-out missed) Bosque; (penalty shoot-out scored) Pineda; (penalty shoot-out missed) Strappato; (penalty shoot-out scored) Pons; (penalty shoot-out missed) C. Ycart

Júnior Club 1917, Barcelona
Umpires:
Joan Roca (ESP)
Gema Calderón (ESP)

Júnior won the series 3–2 in penalties, after the series finished 1–1.

6 May 2017
13:00

Sanse Complutense	5–0	Real Club de Polo
Riera 7', 17'; Jiménez 16'; B. García 32'; Sánchez-Valverde 41'	Report

SPV Complutense, San Sebastián de los Reyes
Umpires:
Nayra Rodríguez (ESP)
Ruben Rodríguez (ESP)

7 May 2017
13:00

Sanse Complutense	1–0	Real Club de Polo
Jiménez 65'	Report

SPV Complutense, San Sebastián de los Reyes
Umpires:
Álvaro López (ESP)
Nayra Rodríguez (ESP)

Sanse Complutense won the series 2–0.

6 May 2017
13:00

Club Egara	1–2	Real Sociedad
Domingo 68'	Report	Maraña 31'; Pacella 33'

Club Egara, Barcelona
Umpires:
Pilar López (ESP)
María Mercedes Romero (ESP)

7 May 2017
11:00

Club Egara	1–2	Real Sociedad
A. Fito 52'	Report	Maraña 24'; González 37'

Club Egara, Barcelona
Umpires:
María Mercedes Romero (ESP)
Pilar López (ESP)

Real Sociedad won the series 2–0.

==== Semi-finals ====
12 May 2017
12:00

Club de Campo	4–0	Real Sociedad
López 13'; Gil 19'; Iglesias 51'; Magaz 61'	Report

Atlètic Terrassa HC, Terrassa
Umpires:
Concepción Hueltes (ESP)
Mariela Fernández (ESP)

12 May 2017
14:00

Sanse Complutense	2–3	Júnior
B. García 61'; Riera 69'	Report	Serrahima 23'; Brugts 24'; Gil 29'

Atlètic Terrassa HC, Terrassa
Umpires:
Pilar López (ESP)
Nayra Rodríguez (ESP)

==== Final ====
13 May 2017
11:00

Club de Campo	1–0	Júnior
Magaz 32'	Report

Atlètic Terrassa HC, Terrassa
Umpires:
María Mercedes Romero (ESP)
Pilar López (ESP)

== Top goalscorers ==
Pos.	Player	Nationality	Team	Goals
1	Mariona Serrahima	Spain	Júnior	22
2	Lola Riera	Spain	Sanse Complutense	20
3	Begoña García	Spain	Sanse Complutense	15
4	Carmen Cano	Spain	Club de Campo	12
4	María López	Spain	Club de Campo	12
4	Rocío Sánchez Moccia	Argentina	Club de Campo	12
7	Patricia Maraña	Spain	Real Sociedad	11
8	Pauline Brugts	Netherlands	Júnior	10
8	Alicia Magaz	Spain	Club de Campo	10
10	Karina Domingo	Argentina	Club Egara	9
10	Carlota Petchamé	Spain	Júnior	9
10	Clara Ycart	Spain	CD Terrassa	9
