= 2014–15 División de Honor Femenina de Hockey Hierba =

División de Honor
- Season: 2015–2016
- Dates: 27 September 2014 – 3 May 2015
- Champions: Club de Campo (19th title)
- Regular season: Club de Campo
- Relegated: Atlètic Terrassa; Universidad de Sevilla
- EuroHockey Club Champions Cup: Club de Campo
- EuroHockey Club Trophy: Real Club de Polo
- Matches played: 93
- Goals scored: 275 (2.96 per match)
- Top goalscorer: Lola Riera (18 goals)

The 2014–15 División de Honor was the 76th season of the División de Honor, Spain's premier field hockey league for women. It began on 27 September 2014 and concluded on 3 May 2015.

Club de Campo were the defending champions.

== Competition ==
=== Format ===
The División de Honor regular season takes place between September and April through 18 matchdays in a round-robin format. Upon completion of regular season, the top four teams are qualified to play the Final Four, while bottom two teams are relegated to División de Honor B. Points are awarded according to the following:

- 2 points for a win
- 1 points for a draw

== Teams ==
División de Honor de Hockey Hierba Femenino 2014–15 teams
Canary Islands

Team	Stadium	Capacity	City/Area
Club de Campo	Instalaciones Club de Campo	500	Madrid
Real Sociedad	Campo de Hockey Bera Bera	100	San Sebastián
R.C. de Polo	Camp d'hoquei Eduardo Dualde	600	Barcelona
Junior	Instal·lacions Club Júnior	800	Sant Cugat del Vallès
Club Egara	Pla del Bon Aire	800	Terrassa
Atlètic Terrassa	Camp d'hoquei Josep Marquès	1,000	Terrassa
Taburiente ACE G.C.	Campo de Hockey Gran Canaria	100	Las Palmas de G.C.
R.S. Tenis	Campo de Hockey La Albericia	100	Santander
SPV	Campo Municipal de Hockey	200	S.S. de los Reyes
Universidad de Sevilla	Los Bermejales	2,500	Seville

== Regular season standings ==
Pos	Team	Pld	W	D	L	GF	GA	GD	Pts	Qualification or relegation
1	Club de Campo	18	14	3	1	43	11	+32	31	Qualification to Final Four
2	R.C. de Polo	18	11	4	3	31	19	+12	26	Qualification to Final Four
3	Real Sociedad	18	10	4	4	30	23	+7	24	Qualification to Final Four
4	Club Egara	18	9	4	5	30	21	+9	22	Qualification to Final Four
5	Taburiente ACE G.C.	18	9	3	6	29	22	+7	21	
6	SPV	18	7	7	4	25	21	+4	21	
7	Junior	18	4	5	9	26	31	−5	13	
8	R.S. Tenis	18	3	5	10	19	42	−23	11	
9	Atlètic Terrassa	18	1	7	10	20	32	−12	9	Relegation to Primera División Femenina
10	Universidad de Sevilla	18	0	2	16	16	47	−31	2	Relegation to Primera División Femenina

Updated to match(es) played on 1 May 2015. Source: División de Honor Femenina table and rfeh.es
Rules for classification: 1) points; 2) head-to-head points; 3) head-to-head goal difference; 4) goal difference; 5) number of goals scored

== Play–offs ==
Semi-finals
2 May 2015
Club de Campo	1
Club Egara	0
2 May 2015
Real Club de Polo	2
Real Sociedad	0

Final
3 May 2015
Club de Campo	2
Real Club de Polo	1

=== Semi-finals ===
2 May 2015
11:00

Club de Campo	1–0	Club Egara
Magaz 58'	Report

Club Ègara, Terrassa
Umpires:
Carmen Gardé (ESP)
María Mercedes Romero (ESP)

2 May 2015
13:00

Real Club de Polo	2–0	Real Sociedad
Oliva 7'; Vorushylo 64'	Report

Club Ègara, Terrassa
Umpires:
Pilar López (ESP)
Concepción Hueltes (ESP)

==== Final ====
3 May 2015
11:00

Club de Campo	2–1	Real Club de Polo
Pérez 22', 46'	Report	Gómez 33'

Club Ègara, Terrassa
Umpires:
María Mercedes Romero (ESP)
Pilar López (ESP)

== Top goalscorers ==
Player	Goals	Team
(Spain) Lola Riera	18	Sanse Complutense
(Spain) Carola Salvatella	11	Club Egara
(Spain) Patricia Maraña	10	Real Sociedad
(Argentina) Soledad Contardi	9	Real Club de Polo
(Argentina) Priscila Jardel	7	UD Taburiente
(Spain) María López	7	Club de Campo
(Uruguay) Florencia Norbis	7	Universidad de Sevilla
(Spain) Patricia Álvarez	6	Tenis
(Spain) Gloria Comerma	6	Club Egara
(Spain) Alicia Magaz	6	Club de Campo

== See also ==
- División de Honor de Hockey Hierba 2014–15
