= Hyun-a (name) =

- Hangul: 현아
- RR: Hyeona
- MR: Hyŏna

Hyun-a, also spelled Hyun-ah and Hyeon-a, is a Korean given name.

Notable people with the name include:

- Kim Jung-nan (born Kim Hyun-ah, 1971), South Korean actress
- Kim Hyeon-ah (born 2000), South Korean baseball player
- Kong Hyun-ah (born 1972), South Korean sport shooter
- Sung Hyun-ah (born 1975), South Korean actress
- Sung Hyun-ah (footballer) (born 1982), South Korean footballer
- Hyuna (born Kim Hyun-ah, 1992), South Korean rapper
- Hwang Hyeon-a (born 1994), South Korean field hockey player

Fictional characters with this name include:

- Seo Hyun-ah, in 2005 South Korean television series Super Rookie
- Hyun-ah, in 2009 South Korean film Sisters on the Road
- Oh Hyun-ah, in 2011 South Korean television series A Thousand Days' Promise

== See also ==
- List of Korean given names
