= 2016 Women's EuroHockey Club Trophy =

Women's Euro hockey Tournament

Tournament details
- Host country: Spain
- City: Barcelona
- Dates: 2–5 June
- Teams: 7
- Venue: Real Club de Polo de Barcelona

Final positions
- Champions: (Germany) Rot-Weiss Köln (1st title)
- Runner-up: (Belgium) Royal Antwerp
- Third place: (Belarus) Minsk

Tournament statistics
- Matches played: 12
- Goals scored: 64 (5.33 per match)
- Top scorer(s): (Belgium) Marilyn Agliotti (Belgium) Manuela Urroz (Germany) Christina Schröder (Ukraine) Viktoriya Stetsenko (4 goals)

The 2016 Women's EuroHockey Club Trophy was the 40th edition of the women's Women's EuroHockey Club Trophy, Europe's secondary club field hockey tournament organized by the EHF. It was held from 13 to 16 May 2016 in Barcelona, Spain.

Rot-Weiss Köln won the tournament after defeating Royal Antwerp 4–2 in the final. Minsk finished third, after defeating Club de Polo 5–4 in penalties after the game finished a 3–3 draw.

== Teams ==
- (Belarus) Grodno
- (Belarus) Minsk
- (Belgium) Royal Antwerp
- (Germany) Rot-Weiss Köln
- (Italy) Amiscora
- (Spain) Club de Polo
- (Ukraine) Sumchanka

== Results ==
=== Preliminary round ===
==== Pool A ====
Pos	Team	Pld	W	D	L	GF	GA	GD	Pts	Qualification
1	(Germany) Rot-Weiss Köln	2	2	0	0	15	1	+14	10	Final
2	(Spain) Club de Polo	2	1	0	1	5	5	0	5	
3	(Italy) Amiscora	2	0	0	2	1	15	−14	0	

Source: EHF

13 May 2016
15:45

Rot-Weiss Köln (Germany)	4–1	(Spain) Club de Polo
Schröder 19'; Pahl 22'; Oldhafer 34', 48'	Report	Vorushylo 55'

Umpires:
Ilaria Amorosini (ITA)
Frances Block (ENG)

14 May 2016
16:45

Club de Polo (Spain)	4–1	(Italy) Amiscora
Cesanelli 23'; Closa 29'; Giné 39'; Piñeiro 57'	Report	Khilko 35'

Umpires:
Sviatlana Karzhevich (BLR)
Celine Martin-Schmets (BEL)

15 May 2016
16:45

Rot-Weiss Köln (Germany)	11–0	(Italy) Amiscora
Karwatzky 7', 48'; Heyn 11'; Busch 18'; Schröder 21'; Grote 35'; Gablać 37', 40', 52'; Hüls 63'; Arndt 63'	Report

Umpires:
Sviatlana Karzhevich (BLR)
Olena Klymenko (UKR)

==== Pool B ====
Pos	Team	Pld	W	D	L	GF	GA	GD	Pts	Qualification
1	(Belgium) Royal Antwerp	3	2	1	0	11	4	+7	12	Final
2	(Belarus) Minsk	3	1	0	2	8	7	+1	7	
3	(Ukraine) Sumchanka	3	1	1	1	5	7	−2	7	
4	(Belarus) Grodno	3	1	0	2	4	10	−6	6	

Source: EHF

13 May 2016
11:15

Royal Antwerp (Belgium)	1–1	(Ukraine) Sumchanka
Gierts 19'	Report	Stetsenko 26'

Umpires:
Claire Adenot (FRA)
Sviatlana Karzhevich (BLR)

13 May 2016
13:30

Grodno (Belarus)	2–1	(Belarus) Minsk
Halinouskaya 11'; Bahushevich 54'	Report	Batura 29'

Umpires:
Gema Calderón (ESP)
Olena Klymenko (UKR)

14 May 2016
10:00

Sumchanka (Ukraine)	1–5	(Belarus) Minsk
Samodhodchenko 46'	Report	Batura 21', 30'; Mikheichyk 38'; Sazhina 43'; Tsabrova 53'

Umpires:
Gema Calderón (ESP)
Ilaria Amorosini (ITA)

14 May 2016
12:15

Grodno (Belarus)	1–6	(Belgium) Royal Antwerp
Silitskaya 58'	Report	Van Regemortel 5'; Agliotti 10', 42'; Van Haren 13'; Urroz 24', 69'

Umpires:
Frances Block (ENG)
Sandra Wagner (GER)

15 May 2016
10:00

Sumchanka (Ukraine)	3–1	(Belarus) Grodno
Stetsenko 28', 67'; Kurovska 68'	Report	Bahushevich 63'

Umpires:
Gema Calderón (ESP)
Celine Martin-Schmets (BEL)

15 May 2016
12:15

Royal Antwerp (Belgium)	4–2	(Belarus) Minsk
Aerts 18'; Agliotti 35'; Berends 38'; Urroz 48'	Report	Mikheichyk 30'; Syrayezhka 40'

Umpires:
Claire Adenot (FRA)
Sandra Wagner (GER)

=== Classification round ===
==== Fifth and sixth place ====
16 May 2016
09:15

Amiscora (Italy)	0–3	(Ukraine) Sumchanka
	Report	Stetsenko 17'; Kernoz 33'; Shevchenko 59'

Umpires:
Celine Martin-Schmets (BEL)
Sandra Wagner (GER)

==== Third and fourth place ====
16 May 2016
11:30

Club de Polo (Spain)	3–3	(Belarus) Minsk
Cesanelli 27', 62'; Giné 32'	Report	Sazhina 11', 42'; Raiskaya 54'
Penalties
Ortíz (penalty shoot-out missed); Vorushylo (penalty shoot-out scored); Piñeiro (penalty shoot-out scored); Giné (penalty shoot-out scored); Segú (penalty shoot-out missed) —— Vorushylo (penalty shoot-out missed); Piñeiro (penalty shoot-out scored); Giné (penalty shoot-out missed); Segú (penalty shoot-out missed); Ortíz (penalty shoot-out missed)	4–5	(penalty shoot-out scored) Sazhina; (penalty shoot-out scored) Mikheichyk; (penalty shoot-out scored) Batura; (penalty shoot-out missed) Syrayezhka; (penalty shoot-out missed) Filipovich —— (penalty shoot-out missed) Mikheichyk; (penalty shoot-out scored) Sazhina; (penalty shoot-out missed) Filipovich; (penalty shoot-out missed) Batura; (penalty shoot-out scored) Syrayezhka

Umpires:
Ilaria Amorosini (ITA)
Olena Klymenko (UKR)

==== Final ====
16 May 2016
14:00

Rot-Weiss Köln (Germany)	4–2	(Belgium) Royal Antwerp
Schröder 8', 41'; Hauke 34'; Grote 45'	Report	Agliotti 18'; Urroz 55'

Umpires:
Frances Block (ENG)
Claire Adenot (FRA)

== Statistics ==
=== Final standings ===
Pos	Team	Pld	W	D	L	GF	GA	GD	Pts	Final Result
1st place, gold medalist(s)	(Germany) Rot-Weiss Köln	3	3	0	0	19	5	+14	15	Gold Medal
2nd place, silver medalist(s)	(Belgium) Royal Antwerp	4	2	1	1	13	8	+5	12	Silver Medal
3rd place, bronze medalist(s)	(Belarus) Minsk	4	1	1	2	11	10	+1	9	Bronze Medal
4	(Spain) Club de Polo	3	1	1	1	8	8	0	7	Fourth Place
5	(Ukraine) Sumchanka	4	2	1	1	8	7	+1	12	Fifth place
6	(Italy) Amiscora	3	0	0	3	1	18	−17	0	Sixth Place
7	(Belarus) Grodno	3	1	0	2	4	10	−6	6	Seventh Place

Source: EHF
