= Mount Mercy College, Cork =

Mount Mercy College
- Model Farm Road, Bishopstown, Cork; Ireland

Information
- Motto: Misercordia (Latin for 'Mercy')
- Religious affiliation: Roman Catholic
- Established: 1965
- Founder: Sisters of Mercy
- Principal: Tricia Ryan
- Staff: 60
- Enrollment: 832
- Website: http://www.mountmercy.ie/

Mount Mercy College is a single-sex school for girls, situated on the Model Farm Road, in Bishopstown, Cork, Ireland. Its current principal is Ms Ryan and current vice-principal is Ellen Van Wallegham. There are 832 pupils currently in the school and almost 60 members of staff.

== History ==
Mount Mercy College were the winners of the Cork Junior Schools' Mace in 2014.

In September 2011, a Young Social Innovators team from Mount Mercy College, Cork, was invited to Áras an Uachtaráin by President Mary McAleese to be personally congratulated by her on their winning of the title Young Social Innovators of the Year 2011.

Mount Mercy College students raise over €25,000 annually to fund ‘Mount Mercy’ classrooms in Kolkata, India. A number of students visit the Hope schools, hospitals and homes in Kolkata every year to identify first-hand how money raised is put to excellent use. Students from Mount Mercy College have also travelled to South Africa to work with the Niall Mellon Township Trust.

Mount Mercy College last won the Kate Russell Cup, the All-Ireland Schools' Hockey championships, in 2006. Three members of the senior Ireland international hockey squad, Cliodhna Sargent, Audrey O'Flynn and Yvonne O'Byrne, were students of Mount Mercy College, Cork.
