= M. N. Ponnamma =

Indian field hockey player

Personal information
- Full name: Mallamada Narendra Ponnamma
- Born: 25 October 1992 (age 33) Virajpet, Karnataka, India

Sport
- Sport: Field hockey
- Position: Halfback
Senior career
Years	Team	Caps	Goals
–present	Railways	-	-
National team
Years	Team	Caps	Goals
2011–present	India	30	(0)
Medal record
Women's field hockey
Representing India
Asia Cup
Bronze medal – third place	2013 Kuala Lumpur
South Asian Games
Gold medal – first place	2016 Guwahati	Team
Junior World Cup
Bronze medal – third place	2013 Mönchengladbach

Mallamada Narendra Ponnamma (born 25 October 1992) is an Indian field hockey player, who plays as a halfback for the Indian national team. She was a part of the team that won bronze at the 2013 Junior World Cup, in Germany.

== Early life and career ==
Ponnamma was born on 25 October 1992 in Kodagu district, in the Indian State of Karnataka, into Mallamada family of the Kodava community. Born to a family of hockey players, her father Narendra, played hockey during his time in the Indian armed forces; her mother, during her college days; and her older sister, who gave up the game after sustaining an injury. Influenced towards the game by her father, Ponnamma was selected by and began training with Madikeri branch of Sports Authority of India, in 2005. After having been noticed for her performances at tournaments at the district level, she was chosen to play for Karnataka in its senior team, at the national-level, and would go on to captain the team as well. She was eventually chosen to represent India in its junior and senior teams, in 2011.
