= Yvonne O'Byrne =

Ireland women's hockey international

Personal information
- Born: 2 January 1992 (age 34) County Cork

Sport
- Sport: Field hockey
- Position: Defender
Youth career
- Years: Team
- 2005–2010: Mount Mercy College, Cork
- 2005–2010: Munster
Senior career
Years	Team	Caps	Goals
2008–	Cork Harlequins	-	-
2010–	→ Cork Institute of Technology	-	-
2011	→ Munster	-	-
National team
Years	Team	Caps	Goals
2014–	Ireland	116+	-
Medal record
World Cup
Silver medal – second place	2018 London

Yvonne O'Byrne (born 2 January 1992) is an Ireland women's field hockey international. She was a member of the Ireland team that played in the 2018 Women's Hockey World Cup final. She plays for Cork Harlequins in the Women's Irish Hockey League and has also played for Cork Institute of Technology at intervarsity level.

== Early years, family and education ==
O'Byrne is the daughter of Pat O'Byrne. She has two brothers, Niall and Lorcan. She was raised in the Model Farm Road and Bishopstown districts of Cork. She was educated at St Catherine's N.S., Mount Mercy College, Cork and the Cork Institute of Technology. In addition to playing field hockey, in her youth O'Byrne also played association football with Wilton United.

== Domestic teams ==
=== Mount Mercy College ===
O'Byrne began playing field hockey while attending Mount Mercy College, Cork. In 2006, aged just 14 and while still a second year student, O'Byrne was the youngest member of the Mount Mercy team that won the Munster Senior Schools Cup and the Kate Russell All-Ireland Schoolgirls Championships. O'Byrne captained the Mount Mercy team in 2010. O'Byrne would later return to Mount Mercy to coach the field hockey team.

=== Munster ===
Between 2006 and 2013 O'Byrne represented and captained Munster at Under-16, Under-18 and Under-21 levels. She played with the Munster senior team in 2011 when they won the Senior Interprovincial tournament. She was named Munster Under-18 Player of the Year in 2010 and Munster Under-21 Player of the Year in 2012.

=== Cork Harlequins ===
In 2008 O'Byrne began playing for Cork Harlequins. She was encouraged to play for the club by Cliodhna Sargent, an Ireland women's field hockey international and former Mount Mercy student. At the time Sargent was playing for Harlequins and coaching Mount Mercy. O'Byrne began captaining the team aged just 19. She subsequently helped Cork Harlequins win the Munster Senior League Division 1 titles in 2008, 2009, 2010 and 2013. She also helped the club finish as runners up in the 2009–10 Women's Irish Hockey League. In the 2016–17 season she was captain of the Cork Harlequins team that played in the Irish Senior Cup final. Other members of the team included Roisin Upton and Naomi Carroll. She was again captain when Harlequins finished as runners up in both the Women's Irish Hockey League and the EY Champions Trophy in 2017–18.

=== Cork Institute of Technology ===
O'Byrne has been a bursary student at Cork Institute of Technology since 2010. She completed a Bachelor of Business in Recreation and Leisure in May 2013. She then began an Honours Business degree in Sport and Exercise. In August 2018, she was completing a research PhD in health promotion intervention in primary schools. She has captained the CIT ladies field hockey team in the intervarsity tournament, the Chilean Cup. In 2012 she captained CIT as they won the Chilean Plate.

== Ireland international ==
O'Byrne represented Ireland at Under-18, Under-21 and Ireland A level before making her senior debut against Spain in January 2014. O'Byrne was a member of the Ireland team that won the 2015 Women's EuroHockey Championship II, defeating the Czech Republic 5–0 in the final. In January 2017 she was also a member of the Ireland team that won a 2016–17 Women's FIH Hockey World League Round 2 tournament in Kuala Lumpur, defeating Malaysia 3–0 in the final.

O'Byrne represented Ireland at the 2018 Women's Hockey World Cup and was a prominent member of the team that won the silver medal. She featured in all of Ireland's games throughout the tournament, including the pool games against the United States, India, and England, the quarter-final against India, the semi-final against Spain and the final against the Netherlands.

Tournaments	Place
2014–15 Women's FIH Hockey World League Semifinals	8th
2015 Women's EuroHockey Championship II	1st
2016 Hawke's Bay Cup	5th
2016–17 Women's FIH Hockey World League	13th
→ 2017 Kuala Lumpur Tournament	1st
2017 Women's Four Nations Cup	2nd
2017 Women's EuroHockey Nations Championship	6th
2018 Women's Hockey World Cup	2nd place, silver medalist(s)

== Honours ==
Ireland

- Women's Hockey World Cup
  - Runners Up: 2018
- Women's FIH Hockey World League
  - Winners: 2017 Kuala Lumpur
- Women's EuroHockey Championship II
  - Winners: 2015
- Women's Hockey Champions Challenge I
  - Runners Up: 2014
- Women's Four Nations Cup
  - Runners Up: 2017

Cork Harlequins

- Munster Senior League Division 1
  - Winners: 2008, 2009, 2010, 2013
- Women's Irish Hockey League
  - Runners Up: 2009–10, 2017–18
- Irish Senior Cup
  - Runners Up: 2016–17
- EY Champions Trophy
  - Runners Up: 2018

Cork Institute of Technology

- Chilean Plate
  - Winners: 2012

Mount Mercy College, Cork

- Kate Russell All-Ireland Schoolgirls Championships
  - Winners: 2006
- Munster Senior Schools Cup
  - Winners: 2006
