= Lea Stöckel =

German field hockey player

Personal information
- Born: 23 April 1994 (age 32) Germany

Sport
- Sport: Field hockey
- Position: Midfield
National team
Years	Team	Caps	Goals
2012–2014	Germany U–21	16	(3)
2013–2015	Germany	54	(2)
Medal record
Women's field hockey
Representing Germany
European Championship
Gold medal – first place	2013 Boom	Team
Bronze medal – third place	2015 London	Team

Lea Stöckel (born 23 April 1994) is a former field hockey player from Germany, who played as a midfielder.

== Career ==
=== Club hockey ===
In the German Bundesliga, Stöckel plays hockey for Rot-Weiss Köln.

=== National teams ===
==== Under–21 ====
Lea Stöckel made her debut for the Germany U–21 in 2012 at the EuroHockey Junior Championship in 's-Hertogenbosch. She followed this with an appearance at the 2013 Junior World Cup in Mönchengladbach and at the 2014 EuroHockey Junior Championship in Waterloo.

==== Die Danas ====
Stöckel made her debut for the Die Danas in 2013.

Throughout her career, Stöckel won two medals with the national team. She won gold at the 2013 EuroHockey Championships in Boom, as well as bronze at the 2015 EuroHockey Championships in London.

=== International goals ===
Goal	Date	Location	Opponent	Score	Result	Competition	Ref.
1	15 October 2014	Warsteiner HockeyPark, Mönchengladbach, Germany	Scotland	2–0	4–0	Test Match	
2	5 May 2015	DHC Hannover e.V., Hannover, Germany	Italy	5–1	5–1	Test Match	
