= María Tost =

Spanish field hockey player (born 1994)

Personal information
- Full name: María Tost Forrellat
- Born: 21 March 1994 (age 32) Sant Cugat del Vallès, Spain

Sport
- Sport: Field hockey
- Position: Forward
National team
Years	Team	Caps	Goals
2013–2014	Spain U–21	18	(3)
2014–	Spain	142	(12)
Medal record
Women's field hockey
Representing Spain
EuroHockey Nations Championship
Bronze medal – third place	2019 Antwerp	Team
FIH Hockey Series
Gold medal – first place	2018–19 Valencia	Team

María Tost Forrellat (born 21 March 1994) is a field hockey player from Spain, who plays as a forward.

== Career ==
=== Club hockey ===
Tost plays hockey for Club Egara in the División de Honor in Spain, and has previously represented Mannheimer HC in the German Bundesliga.

=== National teams ===
==== Under–21 ====
In 2013, Tost was a member of the Spanish Under–21 team at the FIH Junior World Cup in Mönchengladbach.

She followed this up with an appearance at the 2014 EuroHockey Junior Championship in Waterloo where the team finished fourth.

==== Red Sticks ====
Tost made her debut for the Spanish national team, the 'Red Sticks', in 2014.

2019 was Tost's most prominent year with the national side, winning her first medal with the team at the FIH Series Finals in Valencia, taking home gold. This was followed up with a bronze medal performance at the EuroHockey Championships in Antwerp.
