= Erika Akaya =

Japanese field hockey player

Personal information
- Born: 20 December 1990 (age 35)

Sport
- Sport: Field hockey
- Position: Goalkeeper
National team
Years	Team	Caps	Goals
–	Japan	16	(0)

Erika Akaya (born 20 December 1990) is a Japanese field hockey player for the Japanese national team.

She participated at the 2018 Women's Hockey World Cup.
