= Clara Cusimano =

Italian field hockey player (born 2000)

Personal information
- Born: 7 August 2000 (age 25)

Sport
- Sport: Field hockey
- Position: Goalkeeper
- Club: SSD Team Sport
National team
Years	Team	Caps	Goals
–	Italy	6	(0)

Clara Cusimano (born 7 August 2000) is an Italian field hockey player for the Italian national team.

She participated at the 2018 Women's Hockey World Cup.
