= Belén Iglesias =

Spanish field hockey player (born 1996)

Personal information
- Full name: Belén Iglesias Marcos
- Born: 6 July 1996 (age 30) Madrid, Spain

Sport
- Sport: Field hockey
- Position: Forward
- Club: Großflottbeker THGC
National team
Years	Team	Caps	Goals
2016–2017	Spain U–21	13	(6)
2017–	Spain	49	(11)
Medal record
Women's field hockey
Representing Spain
EuroHockey Nations Championship
Bronze medal – third place	2019 Antwerp	Team

Belén Iglesias Marcos (born 6 July 1996) is a field hockey player from Spain, who plays as a forward.

== Personal life ==
Belén Iglesias was born and raised in Madrid, Spain. She is the younger sister of Álvaro Iglesias, who plays for the Spanish men's national team.

== Career ==
=== Club hockey ===
Iglesias plays hockey for Großflottbeker THGC. Previously she represented Club de Campo in the División de Honor in Spain, and UHC Hamburg in the German Bundesliga.

=== National teams ===
==== Under–21 ====
In 2016, Iglesias was a member of the Spanish Under–21 team at the FIH Junior World Cup in Santiago.

She followed this up with an appearance at the 2017 EuroHockey Junior Championship in Valencia where the team finished fifth.

==== Red Sticks ====
Iglesias made her debut for the Spanish national team, the 'Red Sticks', in 2017.

In 2019, she won her first medal with the national team, taking home bronze at the EuroHockey Championships in Antwerp.
