= Elena Sazhina =

Russian TV host, blogger and actress

- Born: Elena Dmitrievna Balabanova; 6 September 1994 (age 32); Saint Petersburg, Russia
- Other name: Elena Sazhina
- Occupations: blogger, TV host, actress

YouTube information
- Channel: Helen Yes
- Years active: 2016–present
- Subscribers: 456,000
- Views: 278 million
- Last updated: 4 August 2026
- Website: plasgas.ru

Elena Dmitrievna Sazhina (Russian: Елена Дмитриевна Сажина, née – Balabanova (Russian: Балабанова); born 6 September 1994 in Saint Petersburg), known professionally as Helen Yes, is a Russian television host, blogger and actress.

== Biography ==
Elena Dmitrievna Balabanova was born on 6 September 1994 in St. Petersburg. In 2011, she finished School # 634. Then she graduated from the Faculty of Economics and Finance at Northwestern Institute of Management. She worked at beauty salons, and was an owner of a beauty salons network in St. Petersburg. She graduated from the acting courses and studied TV host courses. Since 2018, she has been the founder of the Technoplasma Company for the disposal of especially dangerous and toxic waste.

== Career ==
After her daughters were born in 2016, Sazhina started her blog. As of August 2018 she has 3,8 million subscribers at Instagram and 247 000 subscribers at YouTube.In 2016–2017 hosted TV show Good Mourning at TV Channel Saint Petersburg as an expert (stylist-makeup artist). She participated in the festival of video bloggers Vidfest2017.

In 2017 she was awarded the InstaMam Award in the Mother-blogger nomination. In January 2018 she became a host for the TV shows Blin.com (Russian: Блин.Ком) and Eaters (Russian: Пожиратели) one the TV Cafe channel. Since March 2018 she is the host of I'm a Mother (Russian: Яжмать) show on the Your House Channel.

Sazhina was a co-host of the first episode of the show How about Some Conversation? at the TV channel Moscow 24. She also participated some other TV shows, among them: Salons Battle on the Friday channel, Let Them Talk on Channel One Russia, Saranhe on STS Love, #НастроениеLIFE on Humor TV, and Guess My Couple on U TV.

She released the book Caring Mother vs Successful Woman: Rules for Moms of New Generation (Russian:Заботливая мама VS Успешная женщина. Правила мам нового поколения) in May 2018.

On March 8, 2019, Elena released her debut track «Счастье», under the pseudonym Helen Yes [25]. In the same year he released such songs as: «Танцуй со мною, Паш», «Мыльные пузыри», «Лето в ленте», «Моя весна» and «COOL».

In October 2019 she starred in the video clip of the group Ruki Vverh! «Я больной тобой».

== Personal life ==
She is married to Pavel Sazhin. The couple has twin daughters Milana and Alina (born 2016).

== Filmography ==
- Deffchonki (2018) – wife on a divorce (season 6; episode 1)
- Wheely (2018) – Bella di Monetti (voice)

== Awards ==
- The Silver Play Button (2017).
- InstaMam Award as «Mother-blogger» (2017).
- Nomination for the “Mail.ru Lady 2018” award in the category “Best Parent Blogger”.
- Award “Man of the Year” in the nomination “Singing Blogger” (2019).
- Insta-Awards in the nomination "Glossy Instagram" (2019)

== Books ==
- Caring Mother vs Successful Woman: Rules for Moms of New Generation (Russian: Заботливая мама VS Успешная женщина. Правила мам нового поколения) – Moscow: Eksmo, 2018. ISBN 978-5-04-093987-9
