= Caashia Karringten =

Canadian field hockey player

Personal information
- Full name: Caashia Karringten
- Born: 24 October 1992 (age 33) Vancouver, British Columbia, Canada

Sport
- Sport: Field hockey
- Position: Attacker
National team
Years	Team	Caps	Goals
2012–	Canada	24	-
Medal record
Women's field hockey
Representing Canada
Pan American Games
Bronze medal – third place	2015 Toronto	Team
Pan American Cup
Bronze medal – third place	2013 Mendoza	Team

Caashia Karringten (born 24 October 1992) is field hockey player from Canada. Karringten plays as a striker in the Canada national team and made her international debut for Canada in 2012.

== Playing career ==
=== Senior National Team ===
In 2013, Karringten was a member of the Canada squad at the 2013 Pan American Cup in Mendoza, Argentina, where the team won bronze.

Karringten was a member of the bronze medal-winning Canada team at the 2015 Pan American Games. This was Canada's first medal in the event since 1999.

=== Junior National Team ===
Karringten has also represented Canada's junior national team, including at the 2013 Junior World Cup in Mönchengladbach, Germany, where the team finished in fourteenth place.
