= Bae So-ra =

South Korean field hockey player

Personal information
- Born: 22 July 1991 (age 35)

Sport
- Sport: Field hockey
- Position: Goalkeeper
National team
Years	Team	Caps	Goals
–	South Korea	7	(0)
Medal record
Women's field hockey
Representing South Korea
Asian Champions Trophy
Gold medal – first place	2018 Donghae

Bae So-ra (born 22 July 1991) is a South Korean field hockey player for the South Korean national team.

She participated at the 2018 Women's Hockey World Cup.
