= Nina Notman =

German field hockey player

Personal information
- National team: Germany women's national field hockey team
- Born: 1992 (age 33–34) Hamburg, Germany
- Education: University of North Carolina

Nina Notman (born 1992) is a German field hockey player who has played for the Germany women's national field hockey team.

== Playing career ==
Notman played for the University of North Carolina; she transferred in 2013 after spending a year at university in Germany. She was selected for the All-ACC Field Hockey Team three times during her time playing for UNC. She moved to Dutch club Kampong, where she played in defence, her usual position. However, in the 2019 season she played as a forward several games, scoring several goals.

In 2017 Notman competed in the European Championships for the German national team, replacing Amelie Wortmann, who got injured just before the tournament. She was part of the German squad during the 2019 FIH Pro League, playing games against New Zealand, Australia and Argentina.
