= Hwang Hyeon-a =

South Korean field hockey player

Personal information
- Born: 13 September 1994 (age 31)
- Height: 1.67 m (5 ft 6 in)
- Weight: 64 kg (141 lb)

Sport
- Sport: Field hockey
- Position: Goalkeeper
National team
Years	Team	Caps	Goals
2018–	South Korea	14	(0)
Medal record
Asia Cup
Silver medal – second place	2022 Muscat
Asian Champions Trophy
Gold medal – first place	2018 Donghae

Hwang Hyeon-a (born 13 September 1994) is a South Korean field hockey player for the South Korean national team.

She participated at the 2018 Women's Hockey World Cup.
