= División de Honor Femenina de Hockey Hierba =

Hockey femenino

- Sport: Field hockey
- Founded: 1933; 93 years ago
- First season: 1933–34
- Administrator: RFEH
- No. of teams: 10
- Country: Spain
- Confederation: EHF (Europe)
- Most recent champion: Real Club de Campo (24th title) (2025–26)
- Most titles: Real Club de Campo (24 titles)
- Sponsor: Iberdrola
- Level on pyramid: 1
- Relegation to: Primera División
- Domestic cup: Copa de la Reina
- International cup: Euro Hockey League
- Website: rfeh.es

The División de Honor de Hockey Hierba Femenino is the top level of women's field hockey in Spain. It was established in 1933 as Primera División changing its name to current División de Honor in 1986. It's managed by the Real Federación Española de Hockey.

== Competition ==
=== Format ===
Competition format changes for 2013–14 season. The competition it divides in three stages; regular season, 2nd stage and playoffs. Regular season comprises 11 matchdays played from October to March through a one-leg format. When regular season finish, the table splits into two groups of 6 teams each; in Group 1, top four teams qualify for final stage, while in the Group B, bottom three teams are relegated to Primera División. Points during regular season/2nd stage are awarded as follows:

- 2 points for a win
- 1 points for a draw

== History ==
=== Champions by season ===
As Primera División:

Year	Champion	Region
1934	Atlético Madrid	(Community of Madrid)
1935	Atlético Madrid	(Community of Madrid)
1936	Atlético Madrid	(Community of Madrid)
1937-40	-	-
1941	Atlético Madrid	(Community of Madrid)
1942	Castilla SF	(Community of Madrid)
1943	-	-
1944	Atlético Madrid	(Community of Madrid)
1945	Castilla SF	(Community of Madrid)
1946	-	-
1947	Castilla SF	(Community of Madrid)
1948	Atlético Madrid	(Community of Madrid)
1949	Atlético Madrid	(Community of Madrid)
1950	Atlético Madrid	(Community of Madrid)
1951	Atlético Madrid	(Community of Madrid)
1952	Atlético Madrid	(Community of Madrid)
1953	Saeta A Coruña	(Galicia (Spain))
1954	Saeta A Coruña	(Galicia (Spain))
1955	Real Aero Club	(Community of Madrid)
1956	Real Aero Club	(Community of Madrid)
1957	Real Aero Club	(Community of Madrid)
1958	CD Terrassa	(Catalonia)
1959	CD Terrassa	(Catalonia)
1960	CD Terrassa	(Catalonia)
1961	CD Terrassa	(Catalonia)

Year	Champion	Region
1962	CD Terrassa	(Catalonia)
1963	CD Terrassa	(Catalonia)
1964	R.C. Polo	(Catalonia)
1965	R.C. Polo	(Catalonia)
1966	CD Terrassa	(Catalonia)
1967	Atlético Madrid	(Community of Madrid)
1968	CD Terrassa	(Catalonia)
1969	CD Terrassa	(Catalonia)
1970	Atlético Madrid	(Community of Madrid)
1971	Atlético Madrid	(Community of Madrid)
1972	R.C. Polo	(Catalonia)
1973	R.C. Polo	(Catalonia)
1974	Club de Campo	(Community of Madrid)
1975	Club de Campo	(Community of Madrid)
1976	Club de Campo	(Community of Madrid)
1977	R.C. Polo	(Catalonia)
1978	R.C. Polo	(Catalonia)
1979	R.C. Polo	(Catalonia)
1980	CD Terrassa	(Catalonia)
1981	Real Sociedad	(Basque Country (autonomous community))
1982	CD Terrassa	(Catalonia)
1983	CD Terrassa	(Catalonia)
1984	Club de Campo	(Community of Madrid)
1985	CD Terrassa	(Catalonia)

As División de Honor:

Year	Champion	Region
1986	Real Sociedad	(Basque Country (autonomous community))
1987	Club de Campo	(Community of Madrid)
1988	Club de Campo	(Community of Madrid)
1989	Club de Campo	(Community of Madrid)
1990	Club de Campo	(Community of Madrid)
1991	Club de Campo	(Community of Madrid)
1992	Club de Campo	(Community of Madrid)
1993	Real Sociedad	(Basque Country (autonomous community))
1994	Real Sociedad	(Basque Country (autonomous community))
1995	Club de Campo	(Community of Madrid)
1996	Valdeluz	(Community of Madrid)
1997	Real Sociedad	(Basque Country (autonomous community))
1998	Real Sociedad	(Basque Country (autonomous community))
1999	Real Sociedad	(Basque Country (autonomous community))

Year	Champion	Region
2000	CD Terrassa	(Catalonia)
2001	CD Terrassa	(Catalonia)
2002	CD Terrassa	(Catalonia)
2003	R.C. Polo	(Catalonia)
2004	Club de Campo	(Community of Madrid)
2005	CD Terrassa	(Catalonia)
2006	R.C. Polo	(Catalonia)
2007	Club de Campo	(Community of Madrid)
2008	CD Terrassa	(Catalonia)
2009	Club de Campo	(Community of Madrid)
2010	Club de Campo	(Community of Madrid)
2011	Club de Campo	(Community of Madrid)
2012	Club de Campo	(Community of Madrid)
2013	Real Sociedad	(Basque Country (autonomous community))

Year	Gold Medal Match			Third and Fourth	
Year	Champions	Score	Runners-up	3rd place	4th place
2013–14	Club de Campo	2–1 (best of three)	Real Sociedad	Real Club de Polo	Junior
2014–15	Club de Campo	2–1	Real Club de Polo	Real Sociedad	Club Egara
2015–16	Sanse Complutense	0–0 (4–3 pen.)	Club de Campo	Junior	Real Sociedad
2016–17	Club de Campo	1–0	Junior	Sanse Complutense	Real Sociedad

As Liga Iberdrola:

Year	Gold Medal Match			Third and Fourth	
Year	Champions	Score	Runners-up	3rd place	4th place
2017–18	Real Sociedad	1–1 (3–0 pen.)	Junior	Club de Campo	Real Club de Polo
2018–19	Club de Campo	1–1 (4–3 pen.)	Junior	Sanse Complutense	Club Egara
2019–20	Cancelled due to the COVID-19 pandemic.				
2020–21	Club de Campo	2–1	Junior	Sanse Complutense	Club de Polo
2021–22	Sanse Complutense	2–2 (3–1 pen.)	Club de Campo	Club de Polo	Junior
2022–23	Junior	4–2	Club de Campo	Club de Polo	Club Egara
2023–24	Club de Polo	3–2	Atlètic Terrassa	Club de Campo	Junior
2024–25	Club de Campo	2–1	Atlètic Terrassa	Junior	Club Egara
2025–26	Club de Campo	4–1	Atlètic Terrassa	Sanse Complutense	Club Egara

=== Titles by team ===
Team	Titles	Years won
Club de Campo	24	1974, 1975, 1976, 1984, 1987, 1988, 1989, 1990, 1991, 1992, 1995, 2004, 2007, 2009, 2010, 2011, 2012, 2014, 2015, 2017, 2019, 2021, 2025, 2026
CD Terrassa	18	1958, 1959, 1960, 1961, 1962, 1963, 1966, 1968, 1969, 1980, 1982, 1983, 1985, 2000, 2001, 2002, 2005, 2008
Atlético Madrid	13	1934, 1935, 1936, 1941, 1944, 1948, 1949, 1950, 1951, 1952, 1967, 1970, 1971
R.C. Polo	10	1964, 1965, 1972, 1973, 1977, 1978, 1979, 2003, 2006, 2024
Real Sociedad	9	1981, 1986, 1993, 1994, 1997, 1998, 1999, 2013, 2018
Sanse Complutense	3	1996, 2016, 2022
Real Aero Club	3	1955, 1956, 1957
Castilla SF	3	1942, 1945, 1947
Saeta Coruña	2	1953, 1954
Junior	1	2023

== See also ==
- Copa de la Reina de Hockey Hierba
