= Virginia González =

Virginia González may refer to:

- Virginia González Polo (1873–1923), Spanish political and feminist leader
- Virginia González Torres, Mexican mental health activist
- Virginia González, Spanish hockey player, competed in the 2016–17 División de Honor Femenina de Hockey Hierba
