= Lauren Blazing =

American field hockey player

Personal information
- Born: December 22, 1992 (age 33) Durham, United States
- Height: 5 ft 9 in (175 cm)

Sport
- Sport: Field hockey
- Position: Goalkeeper
- Club: Carolina Fury and TarDevils
National team
Years	Team	Caps	Goals
2014–	United States	11	(0)

Lauren Blazing (born December 22, 1992) is an American field hockey player for the American national team.

Blazing played field hockey at Duke University before joining the US Women's national team. In 2013, Blazing attended the Junior World Cup in Mönchengladbach. Blazing played in the 2015 Pan American Games where the US Women's field hockey team won gold. She also participated at the 2018 Women's Hockey World Cup.

She graduated from Yale Law School, where she served as a teaching assistant for Professor Harold Koh. While in law school, Blazing published two reports on gender and racial disparities in congressional nominations to the Military Service Academies. Blazing has previously spoken about how her experience as an athlete spurred her interest in employment discrimination and Title IX. In 2024, Blazing was recognized as a Rising Star of the Plaintiffs Bar.
