= Tara Vittese =

American women's field hockey player (born 1995)

Personal information
- Born: October 22, 1995 (age 30) Philadelphia, Pennsylvania, United States
- Height: 5 ft 10 in (178 cm)

Sport
- Sport: Field hockey
- Position: Midfielder
- Club: Spirit of USA
National team
Years	Team	Caps	Goals
2018–	United States	14	-

Tara Vittese (born October 22, 1995) is an American women's field hockey player. In 2018, Vittese was added to the United States national team, following years of success in the national junior team.

Born in Philadelphia and raised in Cherry Hill, New Jersey, Vitesse attended Camden Catholic High School.

Vittese is also the only collegiate field hockey player to earn National Player of the Year 3 times.

Vittese has represented the United States junior national team since 2012, when she was just 15 years of age. She represented the team at one Junior World Cups, and one Pan American Junior Championship. She was the youngest member of the team at the 2013 Junior World Cup in Mönchengladbach, Germany, where the team finished 7th.

Vittese made her senior international debut in 2018, in a test series against Canada.

Vittese's two older sisters, Michelle and Carissa, also represent the United States senior national team.
