= Liu Meng (field hockey) =

Chinese field hockey player

Personal information
- Born: 17 December 1995 (age 30)

Sport
- Sport: Field hockey
National team
Years	Team	Caps	Goals
–	China	28	-
Medal record
Women's field hockey
Representing China
Girls' Asia Cup
Silver medal – second place	2011 Bangkok

Liu Meng (Chinese: 刘孟; pinyin: Liú Mèng, born 17 December 1995) is a Chinese field hockey player for the Chinese national team.

She participated at the 2018 Women's Hockey World Cup.
