= Shona McCallin =

English field hockey player

Shona McCallin MBE
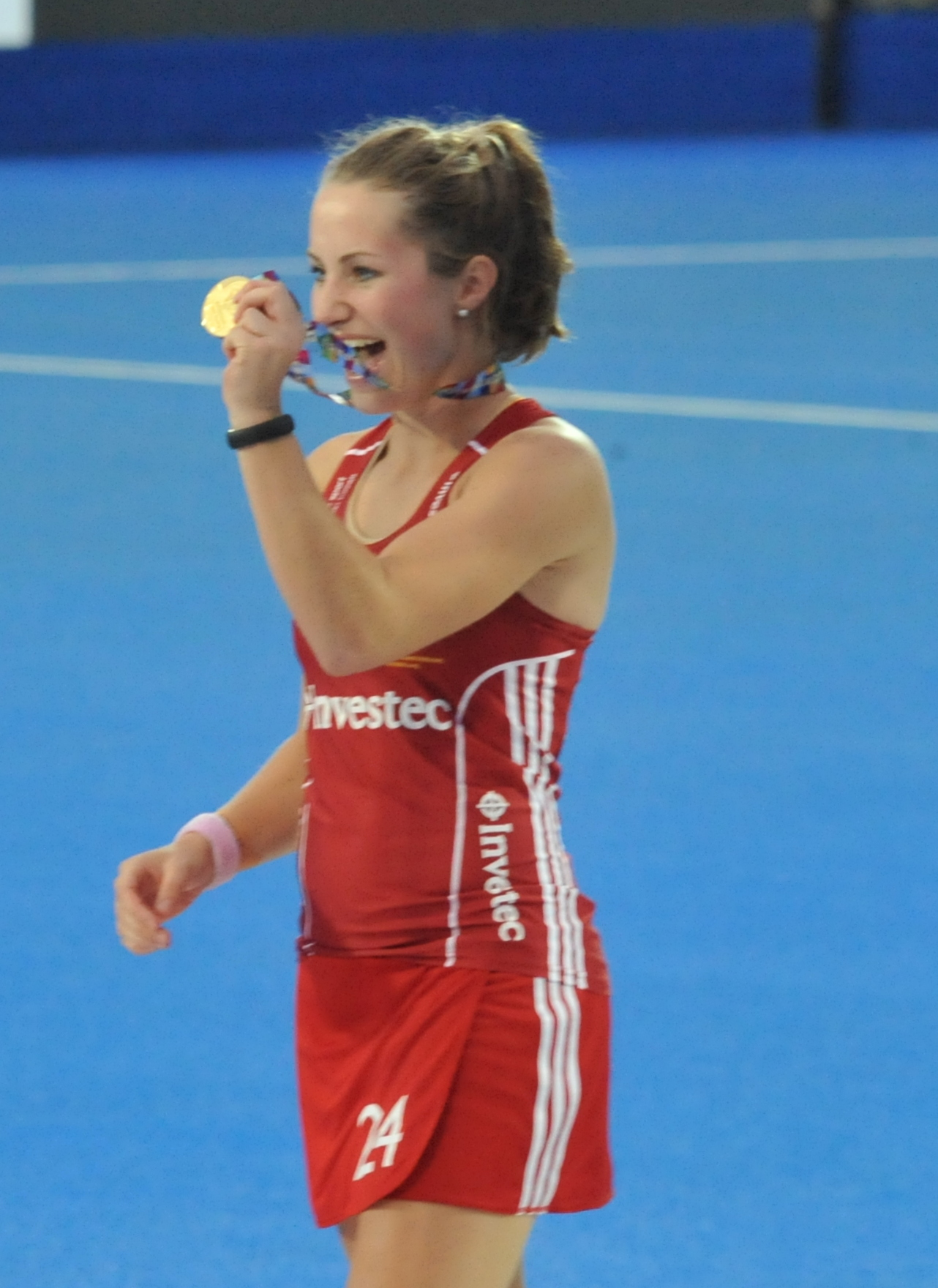
- McCallin in 2015

Personal information
- Born: 18 May 1992 (age 34) Newark, Nottinghamshire, England
- Height: 1.65 m (5 ft 5 in)
- Weight: 60 kg (132 lb)

Sport
- Sport: Field hockey
- Position: Midfielder
- Club: None
Senior career
Years	Team	Caps	Goals
2007–2008	Nottingham Highfields HC	-	-
2008–2010	Beeston	-	-
2010–2014	VMH&CC MOP, Netherlands	-	-
2014–2015	Slough	-	-
2015–2019	Holcombe	-	-
National team
Years	Team	Caps	Goals
2014–2022	England	60	(4)
2014–2021	Great Britain	62	(2)
–	ENGLAND & GB TOTAL:	122	(6)
Medal record
Women's field hockey
Representing Great Britain
Olympic Games
Gold medal – first place	2016 Rio de Janeiro	Team
Bronze medal – third place	2020 Tokyo	Team
Representing England
Commonwealth Games
Gold medal – first place	2022 Birmingham	Team
European Championship
Gold medal – first place	2015 London
Bronze medal – third place	2017 Amstelveen
- Updated on 17 October 2023

Shona McCallin (born 18 May 1992), is an English former international field hockey player who played as a midfielder for England and Great Britain. She was an Olympic gold medalist at the 2016 Summer Olympics.

McCallin began playing hockey in Newark at the age of six. She then progressed through Nottinghamshire county ranks, regional and England U16, U18 and U21 squads, the last of which she captained at the Junior World Cup. She moved to Tilburg, Netherlands to pursue further hockey opportunities, and spent almost four years in the country, gaining a university degree in international business and also becoming fluent in Dutch.

Upon return she was selected for the centralised Great Britain training programme at Bisham Abbey. She was selected for the Rio 2016 Olympic squad and helped them to win the gold medal. On 17 October 2023, she announced her retirement from international hockey.
