= Emily Defroand =

English field hockey player

Personal information
- Born: 27 July 1994 (age 32)

Sport
- Sport: Field hockey
- Position: Midfielder
- Club: Surbiton
National team
Years	Team	Caps	Goals
2017–2019	England	36	(0)
2018–2019	Great Britain	19	(1)
–	ENGLAND & GB TOTAL:	55	(1)
Medal record
Women's field hockey
Representing England
Commonwealth Games
Bronze medal – third place	2018 Gold Coast	Team
European Championships
Bronze medal – third place	2017 Amsterdam
- Updated on 13 June 2021

Emily Defroand (born 27 July 1994) is an English field hockey player who plays as a midfielder for Surbiton.

On 15 June 2021 her retirement from playing for the England and Great Britain national teams was announced.

She grew up in Hornchurch, Essex with her two brothers James and Alexander and whilst still at school started playing hockey for Havering.

== Club career ==
She plays club hockey in the Women's England Hockey League Premier Division for Surbiton.

Defroand previously played for University of Birmingham.
