= Lucía Jiménez Vicente =

Spanish field hockey player (born 1997)

Lucía Jiménez
Personal information
- Full name: Lucía Jiménez Vicente
- Born: 8 January 1997 (age 29)
- Height: 1.63 m (5 ft 4 in)
- Weight: 51 kg (112 lb)

Sport
- Sport: Field hockey
- Position: Midfielder
- Club: SPV Complutense
Senior career
Years	Team	Caps	Goals
–	SPV Complutense	-	-
National team
Years	Team	Caps	Goals
–	Spain	88	-
Medal record
World Cup
Bronze medal – third place	2018 London
European Championship
Bronze medal – third place	2019 Antwerp
Bronze medal – third place	2025 Mönchengladbach

Lucía Jiménez Vicente (born 8 January 1997) is a Spanish field hockey midfielder who is part of the Spain women's national field hockey team.

She was part of the Spanish team at the 2016 Summer Olympics in Rio de Janeiro, where they finished eighth. On club level she plays for SPV Complutense in Spain.
