= Berta Bonastre =

Spanish field hockey player (born 1992)

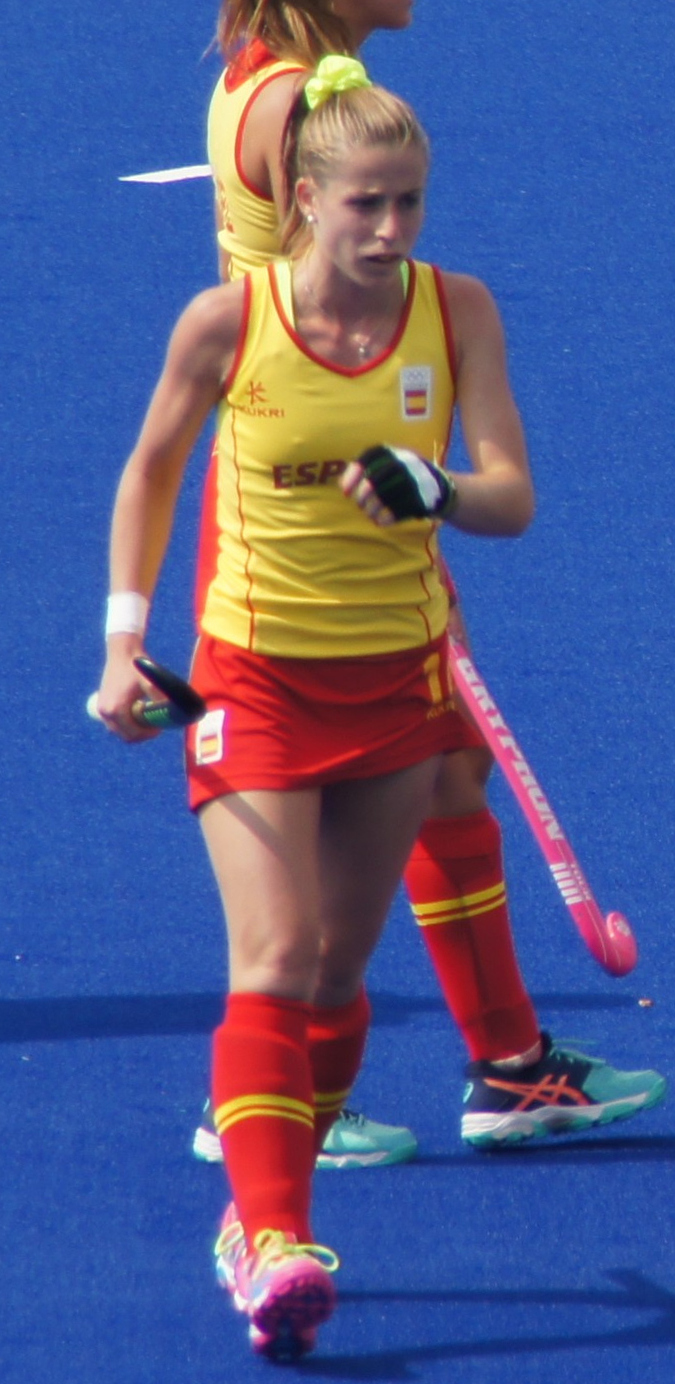
- Bonastre at the 2016 Olympics

Personal information
- Full name: Berta Bonastre Peremateu
- Born: 3 June 1992 (age 34)
- Height: 1.57 m (5 ft 2 in)
- Weight: 50 kg (110 lb)

Sport
- Sport: Field hockey
- Position: Forward
- Club: Braxgata
National team
Years	Team	Caps	Goals
–	Spain	159	-
Medal record
World Cup
Bronze medal – third place	2018 London
European Championship
Bronze medal – third place	2019 Antwerp

Berta Bonastre Peremateu (Note: In this Spanish name, the first or paternal surname is Bonastre and the second or maternal family name is Peremateu.) (born 3 June 1992) is a Spanish field hockey forward who competed in the 2016 Summer Olympics. At the club level she plays in Belgium. In 2015, she received the Silver Stick award as the second best player in the Belgium's Athlon Hockey League. Her sister Silvia is also a field hockey player.
