= Pauline Leclef =

Belgian field hockey player (born 1995)

Personal information
- Born: 31 May 1995 (age 31)

Sport
- Sport: Field hockey
- Position: Midfielder
- Club: Oranje Rood HC
National team
Years	Team	Caps	Goals
–	Belgium	62	-
Medal record
European Championship
Bronze medal – third place	2021 Amstelveen

Pauline Leclef (born 31 May 1995) is a Belgian field hockey player for the Belgian national team.

She participated at the 2018 Women's Hockey World Cup.
