= Cristina Guinea =

Spanish field hockey player

Personal information
- Full name: Cristina Guinea González
- Born: 31 July 1992 (age 34)
- Height: 1.66 m (5 ft 5 in)
- Weight: 61 kg (134 lb)

Sport
- Sport: Field hockey
- Position: Midfielder
- Club: Júnior Fútbol Club
Senior career
Years	Team	Caps	Goals
–	Júnior Fútbol Club	-	-
National team
Years	Team	Caps	Goals
–	Spain	126	-
Medal record
World Cup
Bronze medal – third place	2018 London
European Championship
Bronze medal – third place	2019 Antwerp

Cristina Guinea González (born 31 July 1992) is a Spanish field hockey midfielder who is part of the Spain women's national field hockey team.

She was part of the Spanish team at the 2016 Summer Olympics in Rio de Janeiro, where they finished eighth. On club level she plays for Júnior Fútbol Club in Spain. During the 2016/17 season she played for Der Club an der Alster in Hamburg, Germany.
