= Xantal Giné =

Spanish field hockey player (born 1992)

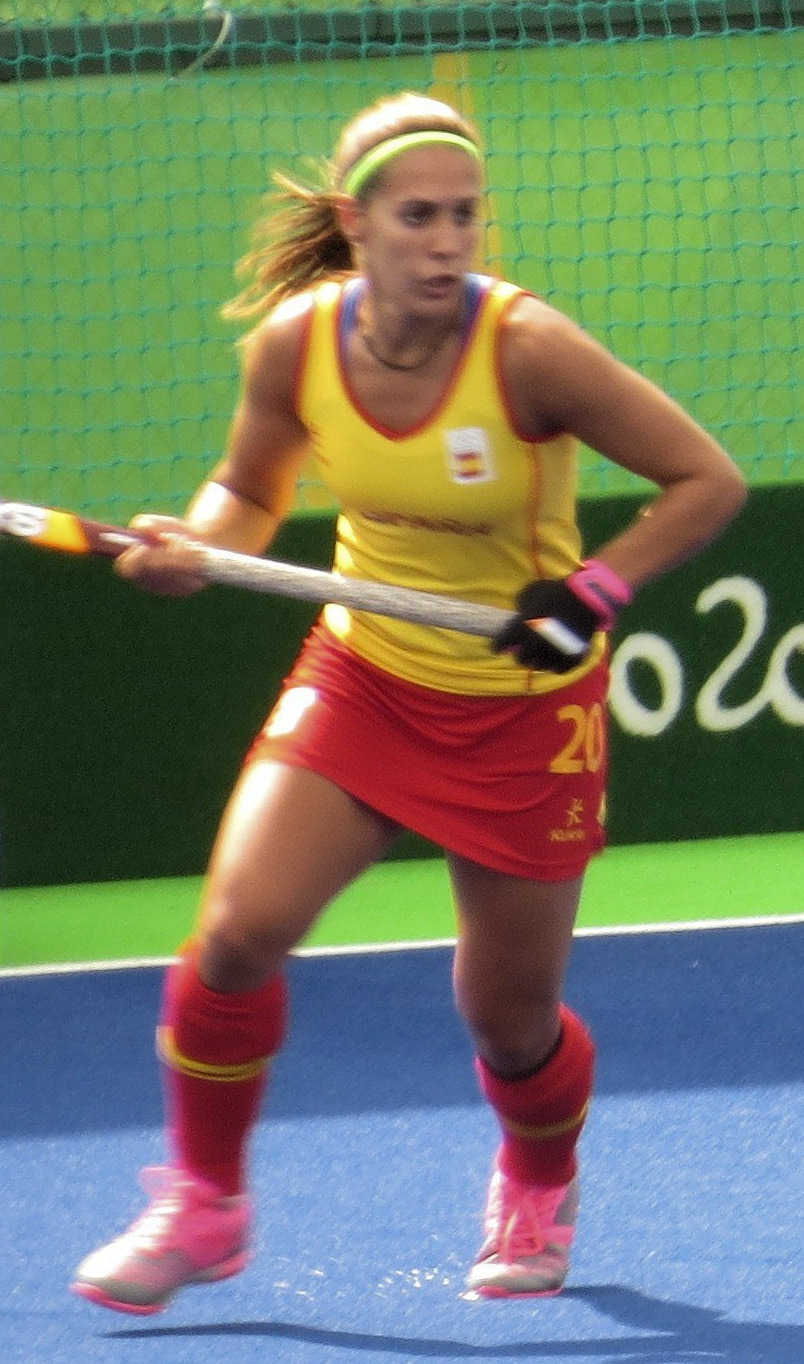
- Giné at the 2016 Olympics

Personal information
- Born: 23 September 1992 (age 33)
- Height: 1.68 m (5 ft 6 in)
- Weight: 62 kg (137 lb)

Sport
- Sport: Field hockey
- Position: Defender
- Club: Real Club de Polo de Barcelona
National team
Years	Team	Caps	Goals
–	Spain	139	-
Medal record
World Cup
Bronze medal – third place	2018 London
EuroHockey Championship
Bronze medal – third place	2025 Mönchengladbach

Xantal Giné (born 23 September 1992) is a Spanish field hockey defender who competed in the 2016 Summer Olympics.
