= Lola Riera =

Spanish field hockey player (born 1991)

Personal information
- Full name: Lola Riera Zuzuarregui
- Born: 25 June 1991 (age 35) Valencia, Spain
- Height: 1.72 m (5 ft 8 in)
- Weight: 69 kg (152 lb)

Sport
- Sport: Field hockey
- Club: SPV Complutense
National team
Years	Team	Caps	Goals
–	Spain	146	-
Medal record
World Cup
Bronze medal – third place	2018 London
European Championship
Bronze medal – third place	2019 Antwerp

Lola Riera Zuzuarregui (born 25 June 1991) is a Spanish field hockey player and part of the Spain women's national field hockey team.

She was part of the Spanish team at the 2016 Summer Olympics in Rio de Janeiro, where they finished eighth. On club level in 2016 she played for SPV Complutense in Spain.
