= Graham Shaw (field hockey) =

Irish field hockey player and coach

Personal information
- Born: 17 October 1978 (age 48)

Sport
- Sport: Field hockey
- Position: Midfielder
Senior career
Years	Team	Caps	Goals
20xx–2003	Glenanne	-	-
2003–2007	KHC Dragons	-	-
2004–2005	Annadale	-	-
2005–2012	Glenanne	-	-
2012–????	Monkstown	-	-
National team
Years	Team	Caps	Goals
2002–2009	Ireland	151	-
Coaching career
- –: St. Kilian's German School
- 2009–2012: Loreto
- 2010–????: Rathdown School
- 2010–2012: Glennane
- 2012–201x: Ireland U-21
- 2012–201x: Ireland U-18
- 2012–2015: Monkstown
- 2015–2019: Ireland (Women)
- 2019–: New Zealand (Women)

Graham Shaw (born 1978) is a former Ireland men's field hockey international and the current coach of the New Zealand women's national field hockey team. Between 2002 and 2009 he made 151 appearances for Ireland and also represented them at the 2007 Men's EuroHockey Nations Championship. As a coach he guided the Ireland women to the 2018 Women's Hockey World Cup final, winning the silver medal. As a player Shaw won Irish Senior Cup and EuroHockey Club Trophy titles with both Glenanne and Monkstown. On 9 May 2010 Shaw featured in two Irish Senior Cup finals on the same day, coaching Loreto to victory in the women's final before going on to play for Glenanne in the men's final. As a player coach, he also guided Monkstown to three successive Irish Hockey League titles in 2012–13, 2013–14 and 2014–15.

== Early years, family and education ==
Shaw is the son of Victor and Nuala Shaw. His father is from Rialto, Dublin and played field hockey with Glenanne. His mother is from Sallynoggin and played camogie with Cuala. He has one brother, David, and two sisters Tracy and Vicki. Shaw was educated at Coláiste Éanna, Dundrum College, University College Dublin and the University of Ulster. He now lives in Knocklyon with his wife Ali, and children Jack and Ellie.

While at Coláiste Éanna, Shaw played both Gaelic football and hurling. His fellow students and teammates on the field included Colin Moran. He also played association football with Firhouse Manor, Lourdes Celtic and Manortown United. His fellow players at Lourdes Celtic included Damian Duff. The Shaw and Duff families were neighbours and they took turns driving the pair to and from training. At the age of 16, Shaw had a trial with Oxford United and was offered a contract. However his parents advised him to complete his Leaving Cert. Shaw was also included in Republic of Ireland squads at under-15 and under-16 level and was offered a trial with Liverpool.

== Clubs ==
=== Glenanne ===
Shaw began playing for Glenanne at U-8 level. His father, Victor, his uncle Gerry, his brother, David and his cousins, Gary and Richie Shaw, all played for Glenanne. During his playing career with Glenanne, Shaw helped the club win Leinster Division One titles, three Irish Senior Cups, and the 2008 EuroHockey Club Trophy.

=== KHC Dragons ===
Shaw played for KHC Dragons in the Men's Belgian Hockey League during the 2003–04 season and again during the 2006–07 season.

=== Annadale ===
While studying at the University of Ulster, Shaw spent the 2004–05 season playing for Annadale in the Ulster Senior League.

=== Monkstown ===
In June 2012 Shaw was appointed coach of the men's team at Monkstown. Initially Shaw planned to retire as a player. However he subsequently continued as a player coach and guided Monkstown to three successive Men's Irish Hockey League titles in 2012–13, 2013–14 and 2014–15. He also guided them to victory in the 2012–13 Irish Senior Cup and the 2014 EuroHockey Club Trophy.

== Ireland international ==
Between 2002 and 2009 Shaw made 151 appearances for Ireland. He played for Ireland at under-18 level before making his senior debut in 2002 in a 3–1 win over Wales. Shaw captained Ireland in 2006 and later served as vice-captain. He was a member of the Ireland teams that won the 2005 and 2009 Men's EuroHockey Nations Trophy tournaments. He also represented Ireland at the 2007 Men's EuroHockey Nations Championship, scoring in a 10–0 win against the Czech Republic.

Tournaments	Place
2005 Men's EuroHockey Nations Trophy	1st
2006 Men's Intercontinental Cup	8th
2007 Men's EuroHockey Nations Championship	7th
2009 Men's Hockey Champions Challenge II	2nd
2009 Men's EuroHockey Nations Trophy	1st
2009 Men's Hockey World Cup Qualifiers	3rd

== Coaching career ==
=== Loreto/Glenanne cup double ===
Shaw was still an active player when he first began coaching. He took charge of a team at St. Kilian's German School where he worked as an assistant PE teacher and he also helped his father, Victor, coach the Glennane women's team. He began coaching at Loreto in 2009. On 9 May 2010 Shaw featured in two Irish Senior Cup finals on the same day, coaching Loreto to victory in the women's final before going on to play for Glenanne in the men's final. The women's final saw Loreto and Railway Union draw 2–2 before Hannah Matthews scored the winning penalty stroke in a penalty shoot-out. Other members of the winning Loreto team included Nikki Symmons, Nicola Daly, Lizzie Colvin and Alison Meeke. In the men's final, Shaw was named man of the match after helping Glenanne defeat Monkstown 4–1. His teammates included Shane O'Donoghue, brother David and his cousins Gary and Richie. Shaw subsequently became the Director of Hockey at Rathdown School and player coach with Glenanne, guiding them to the 2010–11 Euro Hockey League round of sixteen.

=== Ireland coach ===
Shaw coached the Ireland men's teams at under-18 and under-21 level before becoming Darren Smith's assistant coach with the Ireland women in May 2013. He subsequently succeeded Smith as head coach in July 2015. He coached the team to success with the 2015 Women's EuroHockey Championship II. He also successfully guided the squad through qualification for the 2018 Women's Hockey World Cup via the 2016–17 Women's FIH Hockey World League. At the World Cup itself he guided Ireland to the final, helping the team win the silver medal.

== Honours ==
=== Field hockey player ===
Ireland

- Men's EuroHockey Nations Trophy
  - Winners: 2005, 2009: 2
- Men's Hockey Champions Challenge II
  - Runners up: 2009

Glennane

- Irish Senior Cup
  - Winners: 2001, 2007, 2009–10: 3
- EuroHockey Club Trophy
  - Winners: 2008

=== Field hockey coach ===
Ireland

- Women's Hockey World Cup
  - Runners Up: 2018
- Women's EuroHockey Championship II
  - Winners: 2015
- Women's FIH Hockey World League
  - Winners: 2017 Kuala Lumpur Tournament
- Women's Four Nations Cup
  - Runners Up: 2017

Loreto

- Irish Senior Cup (women's hockey)
  - Winners: 2009–10

Monkstown

- Men's Irish Hockey League
  - Winners: 2012–13, 2013–14, 2014–15
- Irish Senior Cup (men's hockey)
  - Winners: 2012–13
- EuroHockey Club Trophy
  - Winners: 2014
