= Nicola Daly =

Irish field hockey player (born 1988)

Personal information
- Born: 3 April 1988 (age 38) Dublin, Ireland

Sport
- Sport: Field hockey
- Position: Midfield / Forward
Youth career
- Years: Team
- 2000–2006: The High School, Dublin
Senior career
Years	Team	Caps	Goals
2008–2009	Glenanne	-	-
2009–2013	Loreto	-	-
2013–2015	Holcombe	-	-
2015–2016	Muckross	-	-
2018–	Loreto	-	-
National team
Years	Team	Caps	Goals
2010–	Ireland	163	-
Medal record
World Cup
Silver medal – second place	2018 London

Nicola Daly OLY (born 3 April 1988), also referred to as Nicci Daly or Nikki Daly, is an Ireland women's field hockey international. She was a member of the Ireland team that played in the 2018 Women's Hockey World Cup final. In 2010 Daly was a member of the Loreto team that won the Irish Senior Cup. Daly has also played senior ladies' Gaelic football for Dublin. Since 2016 Daly has worked in motorsport as a performance coach.

== Early years, family and education ==
Daly is the daughter of Vivion (4 March 1954 – 15 November 2002) and Carmel Daly. She has three siblings. Vivion Daly was a former Formula Ford racing driver. She is also the niece of Derek Daly, the former Formula One driver and a first cousin of Conor Daly, the IndyCar driver. In addition to playing Gaelic football and field hockey, Daly spent many weekends during her youth at Mondello Park watching her father compete. Between 2000 and 2006, Daly attended The High School, Dublin where her fellow students included Alison Meeke. Between 2006 and 2011 she attended the Institute of Technology, Tallaght on a sports scholarship and gained an honours degree in mechanical engineering. Between 2012 and 2013 she attended the School of Applied Sciences at Cranfield University where she gained an MSc in Motorsport Engineering and Management.

== Gaelic football ==
Nicola Daly
Sport
- Sport: Ladies' Gaelic football
- Position: Forward
Club
- Years: Club
- 200x–201x: Ballyboden Wanderers GAA
Inter-county
- Years: County
- 2009: Dublin

=== Ballyboden Wanderers ===
Daly played Gaelic football for Ballyboden Wanderers GAA at club level. Together with Alison Meeke, she was a member of the Wanderers team that won the 2008 Dublin Ladies Junior E Football Championship.

=== Dublin ===
Daly represented Dublin at under-14 level. Her teammates included Lyndsey Davey. Daly made her debut for the Dublin senior ladies' football team in 2009. She was subsequently named as a Dublin Ladies Gaelic Football All-Star for 2009. Daly eventually decided to concentrate on playing field hockey after being selected to play for Ireland.

== Field hockey ==
=== High School, Dublin ===
Between 2000 and 2006, Daly played field hockey for The High School, Dublin. Her teammates and fellow students included Alison Meeke. In the 2005 Leinster Schoolgirls' Senior Cup final, Daly played in a High School team that lost 4–2 to an Alexandra College team featuring Nicola Evans. Daly and Meeke were also members the High School team that finished as runners-up in the 2005 Leinster Schoolgirls' Premier League. In the final they lost 2–0 to an Our Lady's, Terenure team captained by Emer Lucey.

=== Glenanne ===
Daly played for Glenanne during the 2008–09 season. She scored on her Glenanne debut, a 1–1 draw against Bray in the Leinster Division 1. She was encouraged to play for Glenanne by Graham Shaw. Her teammates at Glenanne included Mary Waldron.

=== Loreto ===
Daly first played for Loreto from 2009 until 2013. On 9 May 2010, together with Hannah Matthews, Nikki Symmons, Lizzie Colvin and Alison Meeke, Daly was a member of the Loreto team that won the Irish Senior Cup. They defeated Railway Union in a penalty shoot-out after the game had finished 2–2. The team was coached by Graham Shaw. On 13 May 2012 Daly also played for Loreto in the Irish Senior Cup final against UCD. She scored Loreto's second goal in a 3–2 defeat. Daly also helped Loreto finish as runners up in the 2012–13 Women's Irish Hockey League. Daly re-joined Loreto for the latter half of the 2017–18 season. She subsequently scored the opening goal as Loreto defeated Cork Harlequins 2–1 to win the 2018 EY Champions Trophy.

=== Holcombe ===
Daly played for Holcombe in the Women's England Hockey League between 2013 and 2015. Her teammates at Holcombe included Megan Frazer. While playing for Holcombe she also worked at Ford Dagenham and the Dunton Technical Centre as a test engineer.

=== Muckross ===
Daly played for Muckross in the Leinster League during the 2015–16 season.

=== Ireland international ===
Daly made her debut for Ireland against Belgium in February 2010. In March 2015 Daly was a member of the Ireland team that won a 2014–15 Women's FIH Hockey World League Round 2 tournament hosted in Dublin, defeating Canada in the final after a penalty shoot-out. On 10 June 2015 she scored an acclaimed solo goal against South Africa in the 2014–15 Women's FIH Hockey World League Semifinals. A report in The Irish Times declared "Daly picks up the ball 25 yards out, runs around defenders, pops the ball in the air and volleys it past the Springbok goalkeeper, all at full pace". Daly was a member of the Ireland team that won the 2015 Women's EuroHockey Championship II, defeating the Czech Republic 5–0 in the final. In January 2017 she was also a member of the Ireland team that won a 2016–17 Women's FIH Hockey World League Round 2 tournament in Kuala Lumpur, defeating Malaysia 3–0 in the final.

Daly represented Ireland at the 2018 Women's Hockey World Cup and was a prominent member of the team that won the silver medal. She featured in all of Ireland's games throughout the tournament, including the pool games against the United States, India, and England, the quarter-final against India, the semi-final against Spain and the final against the Netherlands.

In interviews, Daly has revealed how Mariah Carey's All I Want for Christmas Is You became the team's unofficial theme song. Daly explained that some of the younger members of the team had said that the excitement and anticipation they experienced during the tournament "felt like Christmas Eve." The team subsequently began singing the song during training sessions and again during their homecoming celebrations.

Tournaments	Place
2012 Women's Field Hockey Olympic Qualifier	2nd
2012 Women's Hockey Investec Cup	6th
2012–13 Women's FIH Hockey World League Round 2	4th
2013 Women's EuroHockey Nations Championship	7th
2014 Women's Hockey Champions Challenge I	2nd
2014–15 Women's FIH Hockey World League	15th
→ 2015 Dublin Tournament	1st
2015 Women's EuroHockey Championship II	1st
2016 Hawke's Bay Cup	5th
2016–17 Women's FIH Hockey World League	13th
→ 2017 Kuala Lumpur Tournament	1st
2017 Women's Four Nations Cup	2nd
2017 Women's EuroHockey Nations Championship	6th
2018 Women's Hockey World Cup	2nd place, silver medalist(s)
2018–19 Women's FIH Series Finals	2nd
2019 Women's EuroHockey Nations Championship	5th

== Motor racing ==
=== Racing driver ===
On 19 August 2018, just two weeks after playing for Ireland in the 2018 Women's Hockey World Cup final, Daly made her debut as a motor racing driver at Mondello Park. Daly drove as part of the Formula Female team in an event celebrating the track's 50th anniversary. She also co-founded the team. Daly was raising money for the Irish Cancer Society in honour of her father who had died of cancer on 15 November 2002, aged 48.

== Honours ==
=== Field hockey ===
Ireland

- Women's Hockey World Cup
  - Runners Up: 2018
- Women's FIH Hockey World League
  - Winners: 2015 Dublin, 2017 Kuala Lumpur
- Women's EuroHockey Championship II
  - Winners: 2015
- Women's Hockey Champions Challenge I
  - Runners Up: 2014
- Women's FIH Hockey Series
  - Runners Up: 2019 Banbridge
- Women's Four Nations Cup
  - Runners Up: 2017
- Women's Field Hockey Olympic Qualifier
  - Runners Up: 2012

Loreto

- Irish Senior Cup
  - Winners: 2009–10
  - Runners Up: 2011–12
- Women's Irish Hockey League
  - Runners Up: 2012–13
- EY Champions Trophy
  - Winners: 2018
- EuroHockey Club Champion's Challenge II
  - Winners: 2011: 1

The High School, Dublin

- Leinster Schoolgirls' Senior Cup
  - Runners Up: 2005: 1

=== Gaelic football ===
Ballyboden Wanderers GAA

- Dublin Ladies Junior E Football Championship
  - Winners: 2008
