= Mary Goode =

Ireland women's hockey international

Personal information
- Born: 15 May 1979 (age 47) Dublin, Ireland

Sport
- Sport: Field hockey
- Position: Goalkeeper
Senior career
Years	Team	Caps	Goals
199x–2005	Pembroke Wanderers	-	-
2005–2006	Cork Harlequins	-	-
2006–2008	Pembroke Wanderers	-	-
2008–2010	Bray	-	-
2010–2011	Suttonians	-	-
2011–2012	Hermes	-	-
National team
Years	Team	Caps	Goals
2003–2010	Ireland		-
Coaching career
- 2010–2011: Suttonians

Mary Goode (born 15 May 1979) is a former Ireland women's field hockey international. She has also played senior club field hockey for Pembroke Wanderers and Hermes.

== Domestic teams ==
Goode was a Pembroke Wanderers player when she made her senior Ireland debut. During the 2005–06 season Goode played for Cork Harlequins after moving to Cork for work. In 2006–07 she re-joined Pembroke Wanderers. Together with Natalie Fulton, she was a member of the Wanderers women's team that lost 1–0 to Pegasus in the Irish Senior Cup final. In the final Goode saved from six penalty corners. In 2008 she was a member of the Wanderers team that were runners up in the European Cup Winners Cup. Between 2008 and 2010 Goode played for Bray in Leinster Division One before retiring from senior club field hockey. During the 2010–11 season, Goode coached and played as an outfield player for Suttonians, helping them reach the Leinster Division 3/4 Cup final. During the 2011–12 season Goode temporarily returned to senior club field hockey when she joined Hermes. In May 2012, together with Audrey O'Flynn and Gillian Pinder, Goode was a member of the Hermes team that won the Women's EuroHockey Club Champion's Challenge I.

== Ireland international ==
Goode was first called up for a senior Ireland squad in 2003. She had previously represented Ireland at under-16 level. After retiring as an Ireland international, Goode remained involved with the team. Initially as an assistant coach/goalkeeper coach with the under-18 team and later as the senior Ireland women's team manager.

Tournaments	Place
2005 Women's EuroHockey Nations Championship	5th
2006 Women's Intercontinental Cup	8th
2007 Women's EuroHockey Nations Championship	6th
2008 Women's Field Hockey Olympic Qualifier	3rd
2009 Women's Hockey Champions Challenge II	3rd
2009 Women's EuroHockey Nations Championship	5th

== Honours ==
Hermes

- Women's EuroHockey Club Champion's Challenge I
  - Winners: 2012

Pembroke Wanderers

- European Cup Winners Cup
  - Runners Up: 2008
- Irish Senior Cup
  - Runners Up: 2006–07
