= Megan Frazer =

Ireland women's hockey international

Personal information
- Born: 2 October 1990 (age 35) Derry, Northern Ireland

Sport
- Sport: Field hockey
- Position: Midfielder, defender
Youth career
- Years: Team
- 2001–2009: Foyle and Derry College
Senior career
Years	Team	Caps	Goals
200x–2009	Ballymoney	-	-
2009–2012	Maryland Terrapins	-	-
2012–2013	Ballymoney	-	-
2013–2014	Holcombe	-	-
2014–	Ulster Elks	-	-
2016–	→ Mannheimer HC	-	-
National team
Years	Team	Caps	Goals
2008–	Ireland	128	(30)
Medal record
World Cup
Silver medal – second place	2018 London

Megan Frazer (born 2 October 1990) is an Ireland women's field hockey international. She was a member of the Ireland team that played in the 2018 Women's Hockey World Cup. She has also captained the Ireland team. Frazer was a member of the Maryland Terrapins team that won the 2010 and 2011 NCAA Division I Field Hockey Championships. Between 2010 and 2012 she was named three times as an NFHCA All-American and in 2011 she also won the Honda Sports Award. Frazer has also won Irish Senior Cup titles with Ulster Elks.

== Early years, family and education ==
Frazer is from Derry, Ireland. She is a daughter of Stan/Wilson Frazer and Margaret Frazer. She has a sister, Lauren. She is also a cousin of Darron Gibson, the former Republic of Ireland international footballer. Frazer played for the Northern Ireland women's national football team at youth level. Between 2001 and 2009, Frazer attended Foyle and Londonderry College, where she played field hockey, cricket and touch rugby. Between 2009 and 2013 she attended the University of Maryland, where she gained a BA in Hearing and Speech Sciences. Between 2014 and 2016 she attended Ulster University, where she gained a Master's degree in Biomedical engineering.

== Domestic teams ==
=== Foyle and Londonderry College ===
Frazer was captain of the Foyle and Londonderry College team that won the 2009 Ulster Senior Schoolgirls' Cup and finished as runners up in the Kate Russell All-Ireland Schoolgirls Championships. In the Ulster Senior Schoolgirls' Cup final, Frazer scored the only goal as Foyle and Londonderry defeated Ballymena Academy 1–0.

=== Ballymoney ===
In 2007–08 Frazer was a member of the Ballymoney team that finished as runners up to Pegasus in both the Ulster Shield and the Irish Senior Cup. Her teammates included Bridget McKeever and Angela Platt.

=== Maryland Terrapins ===
Between 2009 and 2012, while attending the University of Maryland, Frazer played for Maryland Terrapins. She subsequently helped them win the 2010 and 2011 NCAA Division I Field Hockey Championships. Between 2010 and 2012 she was named three times as an NFHCA All-American. She also won the Honda Sports Award in 2012 as the best field hockey player in the nation.

=== Holcombe ===
In 2013–14 Frazer played for Holcombe in the Women's England Hockey League, helping the club gain promotion to the Premier Division. Frazer scored a hat-trick as Holcombe defeated Brooklands Poynton 8–2 in a promotion play-off. Her teammates at Holcombe included Nicola Daly, Steph Elliott, Lucy Wood and Maddie Hinch.

=== Ulster Elks ===
In 2014, while attending Ulster University, Frazer began playing for Ulster Elks in the Women's Irish Hockey League. Her teammates at Elks included Shirley McCay and Stephanie Jameson. She subsequently helped Elks win the Irish Senior Cup in both 2014–15 and 2015–16. In 2016 she also captained Elks as they won the EuroHockey Club Champions Challenge I. After the Elks were relegated from the Women's Irish Hockey League at the end of the 2016–17 season, Frazer continued to play for and coach the team in the Ulster Premier League. She also began playing for Mannheimer HC in the Bundesliga.

=== Mannheimer HC ===
In 2016 Frazer began playing for Mannheimer HC in the Bundesliga. Frazer also played for Mannheimer HC in the 2018 EuroHockey Club Champions Cup.

== Ireland international ==
Frazer represented Ireland at Under-16, Under-18 and Under-21 levels before making her senior debut against Wales in June 2008. In 2014 she was appointed Ireland captain by Darren Smith. In March 2015 Frazer captained the Ireland team that won a 2014–15 Women's FIH Hockey World League Round 2 tournament hosted in Dublin, defeating Canada in the final after a penalty shoot-out. Frazer also captained the Ireland team that won the 2015 Women's EuroHockey Championship II. She scored in the final as they defeated the Czech Republic 5–0. A knee injury meant Frazer was unavailable for Ireland selection for twenty months. However she returned in time to represent Ireland at the 2018 Women's Hockey World Cup and was a prominent member of the team that won the silver medal. She featured in five of Ireland's six games during the tournament, including the pool games against the United States, India, and England, the quarter-final against India, and the semi-final against Spain. However she missed out on the final against the Netherlands after picking up an injury against Spain.

Tournaments	Place
2009 Women's EuroHockey Nations Championship	5th
2010 Women's Hockey World Cup Qualifiers	3rd
2013 Women's EuroHockey Nations Championship	7th
2014 Women's Hockey Champions Challenge I	2nd
2014–15 Women's FIH Hockey World League	15th
→ 2015 Dublin Tournament	1st
2015 Women's EuroHockey Championship II	1st
2016 Hawke's Bay Cup	5th
2018 Women's Hockey World Cup	2nd place, silver medalist(s)

== Honours ==
Ireland

- Women's Hockey World Cup
  - Runners Up: 2018
- Women's FIH Hockey World League
  - Winners: 2015 Dublin
- Women's EuroHockey Championship II
  - Winners: 2015
- Women's Hockey Champions Challenge I
  - Runners Up: 2014

Ulster Elks

- EuroHockey Club Champions Challenge I
  - Winners: 2016
- Irish Senior Cup
  - Winners: 2014–15, 2015–16

Maryland Terrapins

- NCAA Division I Field Hockey Championship
  - Winners: 2010, 2011
  - Runners Up: 2009

Ballymoney

- Irish Senior Cup
  - Runners Up: 2007–08
- Ulster Shield
  - Runners Up: 2007–08

Foyle and Londonderry College

- Ulster Senior Schoolgirls' Cup
  - Winners: 2008–09
- Kate Russell All-Ireland Schoolgirls Championships
  - Runners Up: 2009

Individual

- Honda Sports Award
  - Winner: 2012
- NFHCA All-American
  - Winner: 2010, 2011, 2012
