= Audrey O'Flynn =

Ireland hockey and rugby sevens international

- Born: 20 February 1987 (age 39) County Cork
- Height: 1.73 m (5 ft 8 in)
- Weight: 76 kg (168 lb)
- School: Mount Mercy College, Cork
- University: University College Cork
- Notable relative: Mick O'Driscoll (cousin) Conrad O'Sullivan (cousin)
- Occupation: Teacher

Rugby union career
- Position: Forward
National sevens team
Years	Team	Comps
2015–	Ireland	

Audrey O'Flynn is an Ireland women's rugby sevens international. O'Flynn represented Ireland at the 2018 Rugby World Cup Sevens. O'Flynn is also a former Ireland women's field hockey international. Between 2010 and 2014, O'Flynn made 120 appearances and scored 30 goals for the Ireland women's national field hockey team

== Early years, family and education ==
Between 1999 and 2004 O'Flynn attended Mount Mercy College, Cork. Between 2004 and 2010 she attended University College Cork where she gained a Bachelor of Commerce and Master of Science in Corporate Finance. Her hometown is Dripsey. She is a cousin of Mick O'Driscoll.

== Field hockey ==
Audrey O'Flynn
Sport
- Sport: Field hockey
- Position: Defender
Youth career
- Years: Team
- 1999–2004: Mount Mercy College, Cork
Senior career
Years	Team	Caps	Goals
2004–2010	University College Cork	-	-
2010–2014	Hermes	-	-
National team
Years	Team	Caps	Goals
2010–2014	Ireland	120	(30)

=== UCC ===
O'Flynn was a member of the University College Cork teams that won the intervarsity tournament, the Chilean Cup, in 2006 and 2007. O'Flynn was captain of the UCC team during the 2009–10 season. O'Flynn was a UCC player when she made her senior debut for Ireland.

=== Hermes ===
Between 2010 and 2014 O'Flynn played for Hermes in the Women's Irish Hockey League. In 2010–11 she was a member of the Hermes team that played in the Irish Senior Cup final, losing 3–1 to Pegasus. O'Flynn also played and scored twice for Hermes in the 2012 Women's EuroHockey Club Champion's Challenge I final, defeating Lille Metropole 3–1.

=== Ireland international ===
Between 2010 and 2014 O'Flynn made 120 appearances and scored 30 goals for Ireland. O'Flynn played at Ireland A level before she made her senior debut for Ireland against Belgium in February 2010. At the 2012 Women's Field Hockey Olympic Qualifier, O'Flynn was a prominent member of the Ireland team that finished as runners up to Belgium. Despite breaking her jaw during a game against Spain, O'Flynn finished the tournament as topscorer, after scoring eight goals in five matches, all from penalty corners. Following her performance in this tournament, O'Flynn was subsequently named The Irish Times/ Irish Sports Council Sportswoman of the Month for March 2012. She was also voted the Ireland Women's Player's Player of the Year for 2012. O'Flynn made her 100th appearance for Ireland during a series of games against Spain in January 2014. In August 2014, during a game against France, O'Flynn scored a quartet of goals from penalty corners.

Tournaments	Place
2010 Women's Hockey World Cup Qualifiers	3rd
2011 Women's Hockey Champions Challenge I	6th
2011 Women's EuroHockey Nations Championship	6th
2012 Women's Field Hockey Olympic Qualifier	2nd
2012 Women's Hockey Investec Cup	6th
2012 Women's Hockey Champions Challenge I	3rd
2012–13 Women's FIH Hockey World League Round 2	4th
2013 Women's EuroHockey Nations Championship	7th
2014 Women's Hockey Champions Challenge I	2nd

== Rugby sevens ==
=== Ireland international ===
In December 2014 it was announce that O'Flynn had signed a professional contract with the IRFU to play for the Ireland women's national rugby sevens team. She made her debut at the 2015 Rugby Europe Women's Sevens Grand Prix Series. In the absence of regular captain, Lucy Mulhall, O'Flynn has captained the Ireland Sevens.

Tournaments	Place
2015 Rugby Europe Women's Sevens Grand Prix Series	5th
2015–16 World Rugby Women's Sevens Series	12th
2016 Rugby Europe Women's Sevens Grand Prix Series	3rd
2016 Rugby World Women's Sevens Olympic Repechage Tournament	3rd
2016–17 World Rugby Women's Sevens Series	
2017 Rugby Europe Women's Sevens Grand Prix Series	2nd
2017–18 World Rugby Women's Sevens Series	
2018 Rugby Europe Women's Sevens Grand Prix Series	3rd
2018 Rugby World Cup Sevens	6th
2018–19 World Rugby Women's Sevens Series	

== Honours ==
=== Field hockey ===
Ireland

- Women's Field Hockey Olympic Qualifier
  - Runners Up: 2012

Hermes

- Women's Irish Hockey League
  - Runners Up: 2010–11 ?
- Irish Senior Cup
  - Runners Up: 2010–11
- Women's EuroHockey Club Champion's Challenge I
  - Winners: 2012

UCC

- Chilean Cup
  - Winners: 2006, 2007

Individual

- The Irish Times/ Irish Sports Council Sportswoman of the Month
  - March 2012
- Ireland Women's Player's Player of the Year
  - 2012

=== Rugby sevens ===
Ireland

- Rugby Europe Women's Sevens Grand Prix Series
  - Runners Up: 2017
