= Church of Ireland Hockey Club =

Field hockey club in County Cork, Ireland

- Union: Hockey Ireland
- Full name: Church of Ireland Hockey Club
- Ground: Garryduff Sports Centre; Rochestown; Cork; Ireland
- Coach: Johnny Bruton
- Website: www.garryduff.ie
- League: Men's Irish Hockey League; Women's Irish Hockey League

Church of Ireland Hockey Club, also referred to as Cork Church of Ireland or Cork C of I, is a field hockey club based at the Garryduff Sports Centre, in Rochestown, Cork, Ireland. The club is the field hockey club of the Incorporated Church of Ireland Cork Young Men's Association (ICICYMA) and is closely associated with the Church of Ireland diocese of Cork, Cloyne and Ross. In 2008–09 Cork Church of Ireland were founder members of both the Men's Irish Hockey League and the Women's Irish Hockey League. The club's senior men's team also enters the Men's Irish Senior Cup. The men's reserve team plays in the Men's Irish Junior Cup. The club's women's teams have been finalists in both the Women's Irish Senior Cup and the Women's Irish Junior Cup. Cork Church of Ireland was one of the first teams to represent Ireland in Europe when they played in the 1970 EuroHockey Club Champions Cup. Cork Church of Ireland also fields various men's and women's teams in junior, senior and veterans leagues and cup competitions affiliated to Munster Hockey.

== Men's section ==
=== Men's Irish Senior Cup ===
Cork Church of Ireland won the Men's Irish Senior Cup for the first time in 1966–67. They subsequently won the cup three seasons in a row.

Season	Winners	Score	Runners up
1947–48	Banbridge	3–0	Cork Church of Ireland
1963–64	Three Rock Rovers	3–1	Cork Church of Ireland
1966–67	Cork Church of Ireland	2–1	Pembroke Wanderers
1967–68	Cork Church of Ireland	1–0	Railway Union
1968–69	Cork Church of Ireland	1–0	Queen's University
1970–71	Lisnagarvey	2–1 (Note: After 2 periods of extra time.)	Cork Church of Ireland
1972–73	Pembroke Wanderers	1–0	Cork Church of Ireland
1973–74	Three Rock Rovers	2–1	Cork Church of Ireland
1998–99	Cork Church of Ireland	4–3	Three Rock Rovers
2014–15	Banbridge	2–1 (Note: After extra time.)	Cork Church of Ireland

=== Men's Irish Hockey League ===
In 2008–09 Cork Church of Ireland were founder members of the Men's Irish Hockey League. At the end of the 2018–19 season, Cork Church of Ireland lost a promotion/relegation playoff against UCD. As a result, Cork Church of Ireland will play in Division 2 and the Munster Division One League in 2019-20.

Season	Coach	Division	Place
2015–16		n/a	7th
2016–17	Neil Welch	n/a	5th
2017–18	Neil Welch	n/a	8th
2018–19	Denis Pritchard	1	Relegated
2019–20		2	

=== Men's Irish Junior Cup ===
Cork Church of Ireland won the Men's Irish Junior Cup for the first time in 1967–68.

Season	Winners	Score	Runners up
1967–68	Cork Church of Ireland II		Monkstown II
1970–71	Lorraine	2–0	Cork Church of Ireland II
1977–78	Instonians II	2–1	Cork Church of Ireland II
1983–84	Cork Church of Ireland II		
1992–93	Cork Church of Ireland II	2–1	Lisnagarvey
2008–09	Cork Church of Ireland II	5–1	Pembroke Wanderers II
2015–16	Cork Church of Ireland II	2–0	Monkstown II
2016–17	Cork Church of Ireland II	3–1	Three Rock Rovers II

== Women's section ==
Cork Church of Ireland have been finalists in both the Women's Irish Senior Cup and the Women's Irish Junior Cup. In 2008–09 they were also founder members of the Women's Irish Hockey League. During the 2010s they have won the Women's Irish Hockey Trophy on three occasions. They play in Munster Division One.

=== Women's Irish Senior Cup ===
Season	Winners	Score	Runners up
1977–78	Pegasus	3–0	Cork Church of Ireland

=== Women's Irish Junior Cup ===
Season	Winners	Score	Runners up
1998–99	Our Lady's		Cork Church of Ireland II

=== Women's Irish Hockey Trophy ===
Season	Winners	Score	Runners up
2013–14	Cork Church of Ireland	8–1	North Down
2014–15	Cork Church of Ireland	5–1	Galway (Galway)
2018–19	Cork Church of Ireland	4–2	Greenfields (Galway)

== Cork Church of Ireland in Europe ==
Cork Church of Ireland was one of the first teams to represent Ireland in Europe. After winning both the 1968–69 Men's Irish Senior Cup and the 1968–69 British Club Championship, Cork Church of Ireland were invited to play in the 1970 EuroHockey Club Champions Cup.

Tournaments	Place
1970 EuroHockey Club Champions Cup	5th

== Notable players ==
=== Men's internationals ===
Ireland

- Jonny Bruton
- Karl Burns
- David Hobbs
- John Jermyn
- Mark Ruddle
- Kevin O'Dea

== Honours ==
=== Men ===
- Club Championship
  - Winners: 1967–68, 1968–69, 2002-03: 3
- Men's Irish Senior Cup
  - Winners: 1966–67, 1967–68, 1968–69, 1998–99 : 4
  - Runners Up: 1947–48, 1963–64, 1970–71, 1972–73, 1973–74, 2014–15: 6
- Irish Junior Cup
  - Winners: 1967–68, 1983–84, 1992–93, 2008–09, 2015–16, 2016–17: 6
  - Runners Up: 1970–71, 1977–78: 2

=== Women ===
- Women's Irish Senior Cup
  - Runners Up: 1977–78
- Women's Irish Junior Cup
  - Runners Up: 1998–99
- Women's Irish Hockey Trophy
  - Winners: 2013–14, 2014–15, 2018–19: 3
