= Shirley McCay =

Ireland women's hockey international

Shirley McCay MBE
Personal information
- Born: 7 June 1988 (age 38) County Tyrone, Northern Ireland

Sport
- Sport: Field hockey
- Position: Defender/Midfielder
Youth career
- Years: Team
- 200x–2006: Omagh Academy
Senior career
Years	Team	Caps	Goals
200x–200x	Omagh	-	-
200x–2008	Randalstown	-	-
2008–2009	Ulster Elks	-	-
2009–2010	KHC Dragons	-	-
2010–2014	Old Alex	-	-
2014–2017	Ulster Elks	-	-
2017–	Pegasus	-	-
National team
Years	Team	Caps	Goals
2007–2021	Ireland	316	(7)
Medal record
World Cup
Silver medal – second place	2018 London

Shirley McCay MBE (born 7 June 1988) is an Ireland women's field hockey international. She was a member of the Ireland team that played in the 2018 Women's Hockey World Cup final. McCay has played in the Women's Irish Hockey League for Old Alex, Ulster Elks and Pegasus. She was a member of the Ulster Elks team that won two successive Irish Senior Cup titles in 2014–15 and 2015–16. Since 2015 she has been Ireland's most capped women's field hockey international.

According to some sources she is also "Ireland's most capped sportswoman in any code" and the holder of "the most international caps by any Irish athlete (male or female) across any sport".

== Early years, family and education ==
McCay's hometown is Drumquin, County Tyrone. She is the daughter of Robert and Hazel McCay. She has a sister, Lindsay. She was educated at Omagh Academy and Dublin Institute of Technology.

== Domestic teams ==
=== Omagh Academy ===
While attending Omagh Academy, McCay was encouraged to play field hockey by her PE teacher, Mary Swann. She was captain of the academy under-14 team which won the Ulster Junior Schoolgirls' Cup. In 2005 she was a member of the Omagh Academy team that won the Ulster Senior Schoolgirls' Cup and the Kate Russell All-Ireland Schoolgirls Championships. In addition to playing for Omagh Academy, McCay also played senior club field hockey with Omagh and Randalstown.

=== Ulster Elks ===
McCay first played for the Ulster Elks during the 2008–09 season. She re-joined the Elks for the 2014–15 season, teaming up with among others, Megan Frazer and Stephanie Jameson. She subsequently helped the Elks win the Irish Senior Cup in both 2014–15 and 2015–16. After the Elks were relegated from the Women's Irish Hockey League at the end of the 2016–17 season, McCay switched to Pegasus.

=== KHC Dragons ===
During the 2009–10 season McCay played for KHC Dragons.

=== Old Alex ===
Between 2010 and 2014 McCay played for Old Alex in the Women's Irish Hockey League. While playing for Old Alex, McCay also studied journalism at Dublin Institute of Technology.

=== Pegasus ===
Since 2017–18 McCay has played for Pegasus in the Women's Irish Hockey League.

== Ireland international ==
McCay represented Ireland at Under-16 and Under-18 levels before making her senior debut. She made her senior debut in January 2007 against Canada. In April 2011 she captained Ireland as she made her 100th senior appearance against France. In March 2015 McCay was a member of the Ireland team that won a 2014–15 Women's FIH Hockey World League Round 2 tournament hosted in Dublin, defeating Canada in the final after a penalty shoot-out. On 11 June 2015 McCay made her 200th senior Ireland appearance at the 2014–15 Women's FIH Hockey World League Semifinals in a game against Germany. In July 2015 she was also a member of the Ireland team that won the 2015 Women's EuroHockey Championship II. In the final against the Czech Republic, McCay made her 209th senior Ireland appearance. As a result, she became Ireland's most capped women's field hockey international, moving one ahead of Nikki Symmons. In January 2017 she was also a member of the Ireland team that won a 2016–17 Women's FIH Hockey World League Round 2 tournament in Kuala Lumpur, defeating Malaysia 3–0 in the final. In August 2017 she made her 250th appearance at the 2017 Women's EuroHockey Nations Championship.

McCay represented Ireland at the 2018 Women's Hockey World Cup and was a prominent member of the team that won the silver medal. She featured in all of Ireland's games throughout the tournament, including the pool games against the United States, India, and England, the quarter-final against India, the semi-final against Spain and the final against the Netherlands. During the tournament McCay scored against United States and was named player of the match in the pool game against India. Before the World Cup, McCay announced she would probably retire after the tournament. However following Ireland's success, she said she would reconsider. She announced her retirement from international play on 9 September 2021.

McCay was appointed Member of the Order of the British Empire (MBE) in the 2022 Birthday Honours for services to hockey and to the community in Northern Ireland.

Tournaments	Place
2007 Women's EuroHockey Nations Championship	6th
2008 Women's Field Hockey Olympic Qualifier	3rd
2009 Women's Hockey Champions Challenge II	3rd
2009 Women's EuroHockey Nations Championship	5th
2010 Women's Hockey World Cup Qualifiers	3rd
2011 Women's Hockey Champions Challenge I	6th
2011 Women's EuroHockey Nations Championship	6th
2012 Women's Field Hockey Olympic Qualifier	2nd
2013 Women's EuroHockey Nations Championship	7th
2014 Women's Hockey Champions Challenge I	2nd
2014–15 Women's FIH Hockey World League	15th
→ 2015 Dublin Tournament	1st
2015 Women's EuroHockey Championship II	1st
2016–17 Women's FIH Hockey World League	13th
→ 2017 Kuala Lumpur Tournament	1st
2017 Women's Four Nations Cup	2nd
2017 Women's EuroHockey Nations Championship	6th
2018 Women's Hockey World Cup	2nd place, silver medalist(s)
2018–19 Women's FIH Series Finals	2nd
2019 Women's EuroHockey Nations Championship	5th

== Field hockey coach ==
Since 2013 McCay has worked as a coach for the Ulster Hockey Union.

== Honours ==
Ireland

- Women's Hockey World Cup
  - Runners Up: 2018
- Women's FIH Hockey World League
  - Winners: 2015 Dublin, 2017 Kuala Lumpur
- Women's EuroHockey Championship II
  - Winners: 2015
- Women's Hockey Champions Challenge I
  - Runners Up: 2014
- Women's FIH Hockey Series
  - Runners Up: 2019 Banbridge
- Women's Four Nations Cup
  - Runners Up: 2017
- Women's Field Hockey Olympic Qualifier
  - Runners Up: 2012

Ulster Elks

- Irish Senior Cup
  - Winners: 2014–15, 2015–16

Omagh Academy

- Kate Russell All-Ireland Schoolgirls Championships
  - Winners: 2005
- Ulster Senior Schoolgirls' Cup
  - Winners: 2004–05
- Ulster Junior Schoolgirls' Cup
  - Winners: ?
