= Irish Women's Cup =

Irish Women's Cup may refer to:

- IFA Women's Challenge Cup, the senior cup competition of women's football teams in Northern Ireland.
- FAI Women's Cup, the senior cup competition for women's association football teams in the Republic of Ireland.
- Irish Senior Cup (women's hockey), a knockout trophy played for by field hockey clubs in Ireland.
- Irish Junior Cup (women's hockey), a knockout trophy played for by field hockey clubs in Ireland.
