= Nikki Symmons =

Ireland women's cricket and field hockey international

Personal information
- Full name: Nicola Symmons
- Born: 2 August 1982 (age 44) Dublin, Ireland

Sport
- Sport: Field hockey
- Position: Defender/Midfield/Forward
Youth career
- Years: Team
- 199x–199x: Wesley College
Senior career
Years	Team	Caps	Goals
199x–2013	Loreto	-	-
2006–2007	→ Eintracht Braunschweig	-	-
National team
Years	Team	Caps	Goals
2001–2013	Ireland	208	(31)
Coaching career
- 2008: Notre Dame Des Missions
- 2009–2010: Leinster U-16 Girls
- 2011–2012: Three Rock Ladies II
- 2012–2013: Glenanne
- 2013: St. Andrew's College

Nikki Symmons (born 2 August 1982) is a former Ireland women's field hockey international. Symmons is also a former Ireland women's cricket international. Between 2001 and 2013 Symmons made 208 appearances and scored 31 goals for Ireland. She represented Ireland at six Women's EuroHockey Nations Championships, during three Olympic qualification campaigns and during three Women's Hockey World Cup qualification campaigns. Symmons played in four Irish Senior Cup finals for Loreto. In 2008–09 she was also a member of the Loreto team that won the inaugural Women's Irish Hockey League title. In 2011 she was a member of the Loreto team that won the EuroHockey Club Champion's Challenge II. In 2015 she was inducted into the European Hockey Federation Hall of Fame. Since 2014 Symmons has worked in Lausanne as a Digital Manager for the International Hockey Federation.

== Early years and education ==
Symmons was raised in Dublin by her mother, Melanie. Her parents marriage broke up when she still a baby. Her mother subsequently remarried into a family with four children when Symmons was six. Although initially estranged from her father, she established contact with him during her teens. Her grandparents, Harry and Rhona Booker, were a big influence during her formative years. During her youth, Symmons played field hockey, cricket and tennis. She completed her secondary education at Wesley College. Between 2002 and 2005 she attended St. Nicholas Montessori College where she gained a BA in Montessori education. Between 2014 and 2015 Symmons completed a Master of Advanced Studies in Sports Administration and Technology at AISTS.

== Field hockey ==
=== Early years ===
Symmons played field hockey for Wesley College. In 1998 she was a member of the Wesley College team that won the Leinster Schoolgirls' Senior Cup.

=== Loreto ===
Symmons played in four Irish Senior Cup finals for Loreto. In the 2002 final, Symmons scored twice as Loreto drew 2–2 with Hermes before eventually winning the cup in a penalty shoot-out. In the 2003 final, Symmons scored the winner in extra-time as Loreto defeated Cork Harlequins 3–2. In 2010 Symmons helped Loreto win the Irish Senior Cup for a third time. In the final she scored twice as Loreto drew 2–2 with Railway Union before eventually winning the cup in another penalty shoot-out. Other members of the Loreto team included Nicola Daly, Lizzie Colvin, Hannah Matthews and Alison Meeke. Symmons and Loreto were finalists again in 2012 but this time lost 3–2 against UCD.

In 2008 Symmons was a member of the Loreto team that finished as runners-up to Hermes in the All-Ireland Club Championship. In 2008–09, together with Hannah Matthews, Lizzie Colvin and Alison Meeke, she was a member of the Loreto team that won the inaugural Women's Irish Hockey League title. She was also a member of the Loreto teams that finished as league runners-up in 2011–12 and 2012–13. Symmons also won European honours with Loreto. In 2011 she was a member of the Loreto team that won the EuroHockey Club Champion's Challenge II, scoring in the final as they defeated HC Olten of Switzerland 7–1.

=== Eintracht Braunschweig ===
Symmons played full-time for Eintracht Braunschweig during the 2006–07 season.

=== Ireland international ===
Between 2001 and 2013 Symmons made 208 appearances and scored 31 goals for Ireland. Symmons had represented Ireland at Under-16, Under-18 and Under-21 level before making her senior debut against Wales in 2001. She subsequently represented Ireland at six Women's EuroHockey Nations Championships, during three Olympic qualification campaigns and during three Women's Hockey World Cup qualification campaigns. On 3 May 2008 Symmons made her 100th senior appearance for Ireland against Italy at the 2008 Women's Field Hockey Olympic Qualifier. On 19 June 2011 she made her 150th senior appearance against Azerbaijan at the 2011 Women's Hockey Champions Challenge I. On 22 June 2013 she made her 200th senior appearance in a 3–2 defeat against Canada. On 24 August 2013 Symmons made her 208th and final appearance for Ireland against Scotland at the 2013 Women's EuroHockey Nations Championship. In 2015 Symmons was inducted into the European Hockey Federation Hall of Fame. She was honoured during a half-time ceremony at the 2015 Men's EuroHockey Nations Championship final. Symmons was Ireland's most capped women's field hockey international until she was overtaken by Shirley McCay in 2015.

Tournaments	Place
2003 Women's EuroHockey Nations Championship	6th
2004 Women's Field Hockey Olympic Qualifier	8th
2005 Women's EuroHockey Nations Championship	5th
2006 Women's Hockey World Cup Qualifier	8th
2007 Women's EuroHockey Nations Championship	6th
2008 Women's Field Hockey Olympic Qualifier	3rd
2009 Women's Hockey Champions Challenge II	3rd
2009 Women's EuroHockey Nations Championship	5th
2010 Women's Hockey World Cup Qualifiers	3rd
2011 Women's Hockey Champions Challenge I	6th
2011 Women's EuroHockey Nations Championship	6th
2012 Women's Field Hockey Olympic Qualifier	2nd
2012 Women's Hockey Investec Cup	6th
2012 Women's Hockey Champions Challenge I	3rd
2012–13 Women's FIH Hockey World League Round 2	4th
2013 Women's EuroHockey Nations Championship	7th

=== Coach ===
Symmons began coaching while still an active player. In 2008 she was teaching and coaching at Notre Dame Des Missions. In 2009 and 2010 she worked with the Leinster U-16 Girls squad. During the 2011–12 season she coached Three Rock Ladies II to promotion from the Leinster Women's Division Five to Division Four. She also guided them to a win in a Division Five/Six Cup title. During the 2012–13 season she coached a Glenanne Ladies team that included Mary Waldron in the Leinster Women's Division One. She also coached at St. Andrew's College. In 2014 Symmons was also a coach on the RTÉ programme Ireland's Fittest Family.

== Cricket ==
Nikki Symmons
Cricket information
- Batting: Right-handed
- Bowling: Right-arm medium
- Role: Batter

International information
- National side: Ireland (2010)
- ODI debut (cap 64): 6 October 2010 v Pakistan
- Last ODI: 12 October 2010 v Sri Lanka
- T20I debut (cap 3): 14 October 2010 v Sri Lanka
- Last T20I: 16 October 2010 v Netherlands

Career statistics
Competition	WODI	WT20I	WLA
Matches	4	3	5
Runs scored	15	110	15
Batting average	3.75	36.66	3.75
100s/50s	0/0	0/1	0/0
Top score	6	86	6
Catches/stumpings	1/–	2/–	1/–
- Source: CricketArchive, 2 June 2021

=== Domestic teams ===
Symmons played cricket at Wesley College and for Pembroke. Her Pembroke teammates included Mary Waldron and Kim Garth.

=== Ireland international ===
Symmons was selected to represent Ireland at the 2010 ICC Women's Cricket Challenge. She subsequently played four One Day Internationals and three Twenty20 Internationals matches during the series. On 6 October 2010 she made her WODI debut against Pakistan. On 14 October 2010 she made her WT20I against Sri Lanka. On 16 October 2010 she scored 86 off 48 balls in a WT20I win against the Netherlands.

== FIH ==
Since September 2014 Symmons has worked as a Digital Manager for the International Hockey Federation. She is based at the FIH headquarters in Lausanne, Switzerland.

== Personal life ==
Symmons is openly gay. She came out to family members when she was 21. In October 2014 Symmons spoke publicly about being gay for the first time. She appeared on the RTÉ2 programme Second Captains Live, taking part in a discussion on homosexuality in modern sports along with Shane Horgan and Donal Óg Cusack.

== Honours ==
=== Field hockey ===
Ireland

- Women's Field Hockey Olympic Qualifier
  - Runners Up: 2012

Loreto

- Irish Senior Cup
  - Winners: 2002, 2003, 2009–10
  - Runners Up: 2011–12
- Women's Irish Hockey League
  - Winners: 2008–09
  - Runners Up: 2011–12, 2012–13
- EuroHockey Club Champion's Challenge II
  - Winners: 2011
- All-Ireland Club Championship
  - Runners Up: 2008

Wesley College

- Leinster Schoolgirls' Senior Cup
  - Winners: 1998
