= Alison Meeke =

Irish field hockey player

Personal information
- Full name: Alison Meeke
- Born: 7 June 1991 (age 35)

Sport
- Sport: Field hockey
- Position: Midfielder/Defender
Youth career
- Years: Team
- 2003–2009: The High School, Dublin
Senior career
Years	Team	Caps	Goals
200x–200x	Corinthian	-	-
200x–	Loreto	-	-
2009	→ DCU	-	-
2018	→ PSI All Stars	-	-
National team
Years	Team	Caps	Goals
2014–2020	Ireland	151	-
–	Ireland Indoor		-
Medal record
World Cup
Silver medal – second place	2018 London

Alison Meeke (born 7 June 1991), also referred to as Ali Meeke, is a retired Ireland women's field hockey international. She was a member of the Ireland team that played in the 2018 Women's Hockey World Cup final. Meeke has also won Irish Senior Cup and Women's Irish Hockey League titles with Loreto.

== Early years, family and education ==
Between 2003 and 2009 Meeke attended The High School, Dublin. Between 2010 and 2013 she attended Sallynoggin College of Further Education where she studied Fitness and Personal Training. Since 2017 she has attended St Mary's University, Twickenham where she is studying for a Master's degree in Strength and Conditioning. During her youth, Meeke also played Gaelic football with Ballyboden Wanderers. Together with Nicola Daly, she was a member of the Wanderers team that won 2008 Dublin Ladies Junior E Football Championship.

== Domestic teams ==
=== Early years ===
Between 2003 and 2009, Meeke played field hockey for The High School, Dublin. Her teammates and fellow students included Nicola Daly. Meeke and Daly were members the High School team that finished as runners-up in the 2005 Leinster Schoolgirls' Premier League. In the final they lost 2–0 to an Our Lady's, Terenure team captained by Emer Lucey. In her youth Meeke also played for Corinthian Hockey Club. Meeke played for Dublin City University at intervarsity level, featuring in the 2009 Chilean Cup tournament. Her DCU teammates included Hannah Matthews.

=== Loreto ===
In 2008–09 Meeke was a member of the Loreto team that won the inaugural Women's Irish Hockey League title. She was also a member of the Loreto team won the 2009–10 Irish Senior Cup. Meeke has also represented Loreto in European competitions. In June 2011 she was a member of the Loreto team that won the EuroHockey Club Champion's Challenge II. In June 2014 she was also a member of the Loreto team that finished third at the European Club Championship Trophy tournament hosted by Leicester Hockey Club. In May 2018 Meeke was named Player of the Tournament as Loreto won the EY Champions Trophy. Meeke's teammates at Loreto have included Nikki Symmons, Lizzie Colvin, Hannah Matthews and Nicola Daly.

=== PSI All Stars ===
In December 2018 Meeke played for the Pro Series Indoor International All-Stars in a series of exhibition indoor hockey games against South Africa.

== Ireland international ==
Meeke made her senior debut for Ireland in April 2014 against India. In March 2015 Meeke was a member of the Ireland team that won a 2014–15 Women's FIH Hockey World League Round 2 tournament hosted in Dublin, defeating Canada in the final after a penalty shoot-out. She was also a member of the Ireland team that won the 2015 Women's EuroHockey Championship II, defeating the Czech Republic 5–0 in the final. In 2017 Meeke made her 100th senior Ireland appearance during a series of games against Spain.

Meeke represented Ireland at the 2018 Women's Hockey World Cup and was a prominent member of the team that won the silver medal. She featured in all of Ireland's games throughout the tournament, including the pool games against the United States, India and England, the quarter-final against India, the semi-final against Spain and the final against the Netherlands. In the quarter-final against India, Meeke scored in the penalty shoot–out to help send Ireland through to the semi-final.

Tournaments	Place
2014 Women's Hockey Champions Challenge I	2nd
2014–15 Women's FIH Hockey World League	15th
→ 2015 Dublin Tournament	1st
2015 Women's EuroHockey Championship II	1st
2017 Women's Four Nations Cup	2nd
2017 Women's EuroHockey Nations Championship	6th
2018 Women's Hockey World Cup	2nd place, silver medalist(s)
2018–19 Women's FIH Series Finals	2nd
2019 Women's EuroHockey Nations Championship	5th

== Occupation ==
Meeke works as a field hockey coach and fitness instructor. Since 2011 she has coached at The High School, Dublin and since 2012 she has worked as a fitness instructor at University College Dublin. Since 2017 she has served as an ambassador for DB Sports Tours. Since September 2016 she has also served as an assistant coach at Rathgar Hockey Club.

== Honours ==
=== Field hockey ===
Ireland

- Women's Hockey World Cup
  - Runners Up: 2018
- Women's FIH Hockey World League
  - Winners: 2015 Dublin
- Women's EuroHockey Championship II
  - Winners: 2015
- Women's FIH Hockey Series
  - Runners Up: 2019 Banbridge
- Women's Four Nations Cup
  - Runners Up: 2017
- Women's Hockey Champions Challenge I
  - Runners Up: 2014

Loreto

- EuroHockey Club Champion's Challenge II
  - Winners: 2011: 1
- Women's Irish Hockey League
  - Winners: 2008–09: 1
  - Runners Up: 2011–12, 2012–13, 2014–15: 3
- Irish Senior Cup
  - Winners: 2009–10: 1
  - Runners Up: 2011–12: 1
- EY Champions Trophy
  - Winners: 2018

=== Gaelic football ===
Ballyboden Wanderers GAA

- Dublin Ladies Junior E Football Championship
  - Winners: 2008
