= Lizzie Colvin =

Ireland women's hockey international

Personal information
- Full name: Elizabeth Holden
- Born: Elizabeth Colvin; 4 January 1990 (age 36) County Armagh, Northern Ireland

Sport
- Sport: Field hockey
- Position: Midfielder
Youth career
- Years: Team
- 200x–2008: Portadown College
Senior career
Years	Team	Caps	Goals
200x–2008	Armagh	-	-
2008–2017	Loreto	-	-
2011	→ HGC	-	-
2017–	Belfast Harlequins	-	-
National team
Years	Team	Caps	Goals
2008–	Ireland	161+	(5)
Medal record
World Cup
Silver medal – second place	2018 London

Elizabeth "Lizzie" Holden (née Colvin, born 4 January 1990) is a retired Ireland women's field hockey international. She was a member of the Ireland team that played in the 2018 Women's Hockey World Cup final. Colvin has also won Irish Senior Cup and Women's Irish Hockey League titles with Loreto.

== Early years, family and education ==
Lizzie Colvin is the daughter of Dr. Peter Colvin and Rosie Colvin. Colvin attended Portadown College, graduating in 2008. Between 2008 and 2013 she completed a Bachelor of Laws at Trinity College Dublin. Colvin's brother, Chris Colvin, is a rugby union player. In 2017–18 and 2018–19 he captained City of Armagh to two successive Ulster Senior Cup titles. He was also a member of the Queen's University that won the cup in 2013–14.

== Domestic teams ==
=== Armagh ===
During the 2000s, while still a schoolgirl, Colvin was a member of the Armagh team that won six successive promotions, progressing from the seventh level of the Ulster leagues to the Women's Irish Hockey League. Colvin was an Armagh player when she made her senior Ireland debut.

=== Loreto ===
While studying at Trinity College Dublin, Colvin played for Loreto. In 2008–09 she was a member of the Loreto team that won the inaugural Women's Irish Hockey League title. She was also a member of the Loreto team won the 2009–10 Irish Senior Cup. She also played for Loreto in the 2011–12 final. Colvin's teammates at Loreto have included Nikki Symmons, Hannah Matthews, Alison Meeke and Nicola Daly. She left Loreto in 2017.

=== HGC ===
In 2011 Colvin played for HGC while on an Erasmus break.

=== Belfast Harlequins ===
In 2017 Colvin began playing for Belfast Harlequins in the Women's Irish Hockey League. Her teammates at Harlequins included Zoe Wilson and Jenny McAuley.

== Ireland international ==
Colvin represented Ireland at A level before making her senior debut in June 2008 in a Celtic Cup match against France. Between August 2013 and January 2015 Colvin was an absentee from Ireland squads while recovering from an anterior cruciate knee ligament injury. In March 2015 Colvin was a member of the Ireland team that won a 2014–15 Women's FIH Hockey World League Round 2 tournament hosted in Dublin, defeating Canada in the final after a penalty shoot-out. In January 2017 she was also a member of the Ireland team that won a 2016–17 Women's FIH Hockey World League Round 2 tournament in Kuala Lumpur, defeating Malaysia 3–0 in the final. On 22 July 2017 at the 2016–17 Women's FIH Hockey World League Semifinals, in the seventh and eighth place play-off, Colvin scored the winner in a 2–1 win against India. Ireland's seventh-place finish in at the tournament eventually saw them qualify for the 2018 Women's Hockey World Cup.

Colvin represented Ireland at the 2018 Women's Hockey World Cup and was a prominent member of the team that won the silver medal. She featured in all of Ireland's games throughout the tournament, including the pool games against the United States, India and England, the quarter-final against India, the semi-final against Spain and the final against the Netherlands.

Tournaments	Place
2009 Women's Hockey Champions Challenge II	3rd
2009 Women's EuroHockey Nations Championship	5th
2010 Women's Hockey World Cup Qualifiers	3rd
2011 Women's Hockey Champions Challenge I	6th
2011 Women's EuroHockey Nations Championship	6th
2012 Women's Field Hockey Olympic Qualifier	2nd
2014–15 Women's FIH Hockey World League	15th
→ 2015 Dublin Tournament	1st
2016–17 Women's FIH Hockey World League	13th
→ 2017 Kuala Lumpur Tournament	1st
2017 Women's Four Nations Cup	2nd
2018 Women's Hockey World Cup	2nd place, silver medalist(s)
2018–19 Women's FIH Series Finals	2nd
2019 Women's EuroHockey Nations Championship	5th

== Personal life ==
=== Occupation ===
Between 2014 and 2016 Colvin worked as a trainee solicitor with A&L Goodbody in Dublin. After qualifying as a lawyer in 2017 she began working as an employment law specialist with DWF in Belfast. Together with Gillian Pinder, Nicola Evans, Anna O'Flanagan and Deirdre Duke, Colvin was one of five lawyers in the Ireland squad at the 2018 Women's Hockey World Cup.

=== Engagement ===
In January 2018, while celebrating her 28th birthday in Salzburg, Austria, Colvin got engaged to Matthew Holden from South Africa. The couple met in 2012 while Colvin was on a four-month visit to New Zealand.

== Honours ==
Ireland

- Women's Hockey World Cup
  - Runners Up: 2018
- Women's FIH Hockey World League
  - Winners: 2015 Dublin, 2017 Kuala Lumpur
- Women's FIH Hockey Series
  - Runners Up: 2019 Banbridge
- Women's Four Nations Cup
  - Runners Up: 2017
- Women's Field Hockey Olympic Qualifier
  - Runners Up: 2012

Loreto

- Women's Irish Hockey League
  - Winners: 2008–09: 1
  - Runners Up: 2011–12, 2012–13, 2014–15: 3
- Irish Senior Cup
  - Winners: 2009–10: 1
  - Runners Up: 2011–12: 1
