= Ayeisha McFerran =

Ireland women's hockey international

Personal information
- Born: 10 January 1996 (age 30) County Antrim, Northern Ireland

Sport
- Sport: Field hockey
- Position: Goalkeeper
- Club: Tillburg
Youth career
- Years: Team
- 2008–2014: Larne Grammar School
Senior career
Years	Team	Caps	Goals
20xx–2014	Randalstown	-	-
2014–2015	Pegasus	-	-
2015–2019	Louisville Cardinals	-	-
2019–2023	Kampong	-	-
2023–	Tillburg	-	-
National team
Years	Team	Caps	Goals
2014–	Ireland	73	(0)
Medal record
World Cup
Silver medal – second place	2018 London

Ayeisha McFerran (born 10 January 1996) is an Ireland women's field hockey international. She was a member of the Ireland team that played in the 2018 Women's Hockey World Cup final. She was also named Goalkeeper of the Tournament. McFerran was also a member of the Pegasus team that won the 2014–15 Women's Irish Hockey League. Between 2015 and 2017 she was named three times as an NFHCA All-American while playing for Louisville Cardinals.

== Early years, family and education ==
McFerran is originally from Larne. She is the daughter of George and Sandra McFerran. She has three siblings, Tamara, Reece and Shea. Her mother died when McFerran was 14. She was educated at Larne Grammar School and at the University of Louisville. In addition to playing field hockey, in her youth McFerran was an Irish dancer and played the flute.

== Domestic teams ==
=== Larne Grammar School ===
After taking up field hockey at age 7, McFerran began representing Larne Grammar School as a Year 8 pupil in 2008. McFerran was still a pupil at Larne Grammar School when she made her senior debut for Ireland.

=== Randalstown ===
In addition to playing for Larne Grammar School, McFerran also played club field hockey with her PE teacher, Emma Knox, at Randalstown. McFerran was a Randalstown player when she made her senior debut for Ireland.

=== Pegasus ===
McFerran joined Pegasus in September 2014 after a proposed plan to play for UCD fell through. She was subsequently a member of the Pegasus team that won the 2014–15 Women's Irish Hockey League title. She was also named as the league's best goalkeeper.

=== Louisville Cardinals ===
In 2015 McFerran began a field hockey scholarship at the University of Louisville. Between 2015 and 2017 she was named three times as an NFHCA All-American while playing for Louisville Cardinals. While based in Louisville, Kentucky, McFerran also worked as a goalkeeper coach at a local field hockey club, IFHCK.

=== Kampong ===
In August 2019, McFerran joined Dutch Hoofdklasse club SV Kampong.

== Ireland international ==
McFerran made her senior debut for Ireland against Spain on 11 January 2014, the day after her 18th birthday. In March 2015 McFerran was a member of the Ireland team that won a 2014–15 Women's FIH Hockey World League Round 2 tournament hosted in Dublin, defeating Canada in the final after a penalty shoot-out. McFerran, regarded as a shoot-out specialist, replaced Emma Gray specifically for the shoot-out and subsequently saved three penalties. She was also a member of the Ireland team that won the 2015 Women's EuroHockey Championship II, defeating the Czech Republic 5–0 in the final. In January 2017 she was also a member of the Ireland team that won a 2016–17 Women's FIH Hockey World League Round 2 tournament in Kuala Lumpur, defeating Malaysia 3–0 in the final.

McFerran represented Ireland at the 2018 Women's Hockey World Cup and was a prominent member of the team that won the silver medal. She featured in all of Ireland's games throughout the tournament, including the pool games against the United States, India, and England, the quarter-final against India, the semi-final against Spain and the final against the Netherlands. Both the quarter-final against India and the semi-final against Spain were decided by penalty shoot-out and McFerran was instrumental in Ireland reaching the final. She saved three penalties against India and four against Spain. On the way to the final she conceded just three goals in five matches and she was subsequently named Goalkeeper of the Tournament.

Tournaments	Place
2014 Women's Hockey Champions Challenge I	2nd
2014–15 Women's FIH Hockey World League	15th
→ 2015 Dublin Tournament	1st
2015 Women's EuroHockey Championship II	1st
2016 Hawke's Bay Cup	5th
2016–17 Women's FIH Hockey World League	13th
→ 2017 Kuala Lumpur Tournament	1st
2017 Women's Four Nations Cup	2nd
2018 Women's Hockey World Cup	2nd place, silver medalist(s)
2018–19 Women's FIH Series Finals	2nd
2019 Women's EuroHockey Nations Championship	5th

== Honours ==
Ireland

- Women's Hockey World Cup
  - Runners Up: 2018
- Women's FIH Hockey World League
  - Winners: 2015 Dublin, 2017 Kuala Lumpur
- Women's EuroHockey Championship II
  - Winners: 2015
- Women's Hockey Champions Challenge I
  - Runners Up: 2014
- Women's FIH Hockey Series
  - Runners Up: 2019 Banbridge
- Women's Four Nations Cup
  - Runners Up: 2017

Pegasus

- Women's Irish Hockey League
  - Winners: 2014–15

Individual

- NFHCA All-American
  - Winner: 2015, 2016, 2017, 2018
- Goalkeeper of the Tournament
  - Winner: 2018 Women's Hockey World Cup

== Personal life ==
McFerran is a lesbian and in a relationship with Anne Veenendaal who is in the Dutch Field Hockey team.
