= Irish Junior Cup =

Irish Junior Cup may refer to:

- Irish Junior Cup (ladies' hockey)
- Irish Junior Cup (men's hockey)
