= Hannah Matthews =

Irish field hockey player (born 1991)

Personal information
- Born: 24 March 1991 (age 35)

Sport
- Sport: Field hockey
- Position: Defender
Youth career
- Years: Team
- 2005–2009: Loreto, Beaufort
Senior career
Years	Team	Caps	Goals
200x–	Loreto	-	-
2009–201x	→ DCU	-	-
National team
Years	Team	Caps	Goals
2014–	Ireland	108+	(4)
Medal record
World Cup
Silver medal – second place	2018 London

Hannah Matthews (born 24 March 1991) is an Ireland women's field hockey international. She was a member of the Ireland team that played in the 2018 Women's Hockey World Cup final. Matthews has also won Irish Senior Cup and Women's Irish Hockey League titles with Loreto. She is the daughter of Phillip Matthews, the former Ireland rugby union international.

== Early life and education ==
Matthews is the daughter of Phillip Matthews, the former Ireland rugby union international, and his wife, Lisa Flynn. Her maternal grandfather, Kevin Flynn, was also an Ireland rugby union international. Matthews was educated at Loreto High School Beaufort in Rathfarnham and went on to study at Dublin City University. She works as a primary school teacher.

== Domestic teams ==
=== Loreto, Beaufort ===
Matthews played in three Leinster Schoolgirls' Senior Cup finals for Loreto Beaufort, each time playing against teams that included future Ireland teammates. In the 2006 final Loreto, Beaufort lost 2–0 to St. Andrew's College. 13-year-old Chloe Watkins scored St Andrew's second goal. In the 2008 final Matthews scored the winner from a penalty corner as Loreto, Beaufort defeated an Alexandra College team featuring Nicola Evans and Deirdre Duke 2–1. In the 2009 final Matthews captained Loreto, Beaufort as they faced a St. Andrew's team featuring Chloe Watkins and Gillian Pinder. This time St. Andrew's won 2–0 after extra time.

=== DCU ===
Matthews played for Dublin City University at intervarsity level, featuring in the 2009, 2010 and 2012 Chilean Cup tournaments. Her DCU teammates included Alison Meeke.

=== Loreto ===
In 2008–09 Matthews was a member of the Loreto team that won the inaugural Women's Irish Hockey League title. In the 2009–10 Irish Senior Cup final against Railway Union, Matthews scored the winning penalty stroke in a penalty shoot-out after the game had finished 2–2. Matthews also scored for Loreto in the 2011–12 final but this time they lost 3–2 against UCD. Matthews has also represented Loreto in European competitions. In June 2011 she scored in the EuroHockey Club Champion's Challenge II final as Loreto defeated HC Olten of Switzerland 7–1. In 2014 she captained Loreto to third place at the European Club Championship Trophy tournament hosted by Leicester Hockey Club. In May 2018 Matthews captained Loreto as they won the EY Champions Trophy. Matthews teammates at Loreto have included Nikki Symmons, Lizzie Colvin, Alison Meeke, Nicola Daly and Elena Tice.

== Ireland international ==
Matthews made her senior debut for Ireland in June 2014 against Italy. She had previously represented Ireland at Under-18 level. In March 2015 Matthews was a member of the Ireland team that won a 2014–15 Women's FIH Hockey World League Round 2 tournament hosted in Dublin, defeating Canada in the final after a penalty shoot-out. She was also a member of the Ireland team that won the 2015 Women's EuroHockey Championship II, defeating the Czech Republic 5–0 in the final. In January 2017 she was also a member of the Ireland team that won a 2016–17 Women's FIH Hockey World League Round 2 tournament in Kuala Lumpur, defeating Malaysia 3–0 in the final. In June 2018 Matthews made her 100th senior international appearance for Ireland during a series of games against Canada.

Matthews represented Ireland at the 2018 Women's Hockey World Cup and was a prominent member of the team that won the silver medal. She featured in all of Ireland's games throughout the tournament, including the pool games against the United States, India, and England, the quarter-final against India, the semi-final against Spain and the final against the Netherlands.

Tournaments	Place
2014–15 Women's FIH Hockey World League	15th
→ 2015 Dublin Tournament	1st
2015 Women's EuroHockey Championship II	1st
2016 Hawke's Bay Cup	5th
2016–17 Women's FIH Hockey World League	13th
→ 2017 Kuala Lumpur Tournament	1st
2017 Women's Four Nations Cup	2nd
2017 Women's EuroHockey Nations Championship	6th
2018 Women's Hockey World Cup	2nd place, silver medalist(s)
2018–19 Women's FIH Series Finals	2nd
2019 Women's EuroHockey Nations Championship	5th

== Honours ==
Ireland

- Women's Hockey World Cup
  - Runners Up: 2018
- Women's FIH Hockey World League
  - Winners: 2015 Dublin, 2017 Kuala Lumpur
- Women's EuroHockey Championship II
  - Winners: 2015
- Women's FIH Hockey Series
  - Runners Up: 2019 Banbridge
- Women's Four Nations Cup
  - Runners Up: 2017

Loreto

- EuroHockey Club Champion's Challenge II
  - Winners: 2011: 1
- Women's Irish Hockey League
  - Winners: 2008–09: 1
  - Runners Up: 2011–12, 2012–13, 2014–15: 3
- Irish Senior Cup
  - Winners: 2009–10: 1
  - Runners Up: 2011–12: 1
- EY Champions Trophy
  - Winners: 2018

Loreto, Beaufort

- Leinster Schoolgirls' Senior Cup
  - Winners: 2008: 1
  - Runners Up: 2006, 2009: 2
