= 2013 Women's EuroHockey Championship squads =

This article displays the rosters for the teams competing at the 2013 Women's EuroHockey Nations Championship. Each team had to submit 18 players.

== Pool A ==
=== Belarus ===
Head Coach: Aliaksandr Kisel

1. Veranika Mikanovich (GK)
2. Volha Khamko
3. Natallia Stsifutina
4. Ryta Batura (C)
5. Rehina Sycheuskaya
6. Nastassia Syraezhka
7. Hanna Dakutovich
8. Yuliya Mikheichyk
9. Sviatlana Bahushevich
10. Khrystsina Kibkova
11. Krestina Kulinkovich
12. Nadzeya Silitskaya
13. Maryia Halinovskaya
14. Natallia Zanko
15. Volha Shyntar
16. Viktoryia Haurylava
17. Hanna Zabrotskaya
20. Marina Navitskaya (GK)

=== Belgium ===
Head Coach: Pascal Kina

1. Nadine Khouzam (GK)
2. Anne-Sophie De Scheemaeckere
3. Louise Cavenaile
4. Aline Fobe
5. Stephanie De Groof
6. Anouk Raes
7. Judith Vandermeiren
8. Stephanie Rummens
9. Lieselotte Van Lindt
11. Erica Coppey
13. Alix Gerniers
14. Emilie Sinia
15. Charlotte De Vos (C)
16. Louise Versavel
18. Maureen Beernaert
19. Barbara Nelen
21. Aisling D'Hooghe (GK)
27. Jill Boon

=== Ireland ===
Head Coach: Darren Smith

1. Emma Gray (GK)
5. Cliodhna Sargent
6. Emma Smyth
9. Alex Speers (C)
10. Shirley McCay
11. Megan Frazer
12. Lisa Jacob
13. Niamh Small
14. Naomi Carroll
17. Nikki Symmons
18. Audrey O'Flynn
20. Chloe Watkins
22. Nicola Daly
23. Niamh Atcheler
25. Nicola Gray
26. Anna O'Flanagan
27. Gillian Pinder
31. Grace O'Flanagan (GK)

=== Netherlands ===
Head Coach: Maximiliano Caldas

1. Joyce Sombroek (GK)
2. Frederique Derkx
4. Kitty van Male
5. Malou Pheninckx
6. Daphne van der Velden
7. Willemijn Bos
10. Kelly Jonker
13. Caia van Maasakker
15. Sabine Mol
17. Maartje Paumen
19. Ellen Hoog
21. Kiki Collot d'Escury
22. Larissa Meijer (GK)
23. Kim Lammers (C)
24. Eva de Goede
26. Roos Drost
29. Jacky Schoenaker
30. Margot van Geffen
31. Valerie Magis

== Pool B ==
=== England ===
Head Coach: Jason Lee

1. Maddie Hinch (GK)
2. Kirsty MacKay (GK)
4. Laura Unsworth
5. Sarah Haycroft
6. Hannah Macleod
7. Georgie Twigg
8. Helen Richardson
9. Susannah Townsend
10. Susie Gilbert
11. Kate Walsh (C)
13. Sam Quek
15. Alex Danson
18. Giselle Ansley
20. Hollie Webb
22. Ashleigh Ball
23. Sally Walton
26. Lily Owsley
28. Nicola White

=== Germany ===
Head Coach: Jamilon Mülders

2. Tina Bachmann
3. Kim Platten (GK)
4. Jana Teschke
10. Nina Hasselmann
11. Eileen Hoffmann
12. Lydia Haase
14. Tonja Fabig
15. Hannah Krüger
17. Barbara Vogel (GK)
19. Jennifer Plass
21. Franzisca Hauke
23. Marie Mävers
24. Maike Stöckel
25. Janne Müller-Wieland
26. Hannah Gablać
27. Lea Stöckel
28. Julia Müller (C)
30. Lena Jacobi

=== Scotland ===
Head Coach: Gordon Shepherd

2. Nicola Cochrane (GK)
3. Vikki Bunce
4. Morag McLellan
5. Alison Bell
8. Catriona Ralph
9. Samantha Judge
11. Holly Cram
12. Linda Clement (C)
14. Kareena Marshall
15. Leigh Fawcett
16. Rebecca Merchant
17. Nikki Kidd
18. Susan McGilveray
19. Nicola Lloyd
21. Alison Howie
22. Nicola Skrastin
23. Emily Maguire
29. Amy Gibson (GK)

=== Spain ===
Head Coach: Adrian Lock

1. María López (GK)
3. Rocío Ybarra (C)
4. María López García
6. Júlia Pons
7. Carlota Petchame
8. María Guajardo
9. María Romagosa
10. Berta Bonastre
11. Cristina Guinea
13. Raquel Huertas
15. Anabel Flores
16. María Ruiz (GK)
17. Lola Riera
18. Olalla Pineiro
19. Patricia Maraña
20. Xantal Giné
21. Beatriz Pérez
22. Gloria Comerma
