= Leinster Senior Cup =

Leinster Senior Cup may refer to:

- Leinster Club Senior Cup: rugby union
- Leinster Schools Senior Cup: rugby union
- Leinster Senior Cup (association football)
- Leinster Schoolgirls' Senior Cup (field hockey)
- Leinster Senior Cup (cricket)
