= Pembroke Wanderers Hockey Club =

- Union: Hockey Ireland
- Full name: Pembroke Wanderers Hockey Club
- Founded: 1922
- Ground: Serpentine Avenue; Sandymount; Dublin 4 D04 T329; Ireland
- Website: www.pembrokewanderers.ie
- League: Men's Irish Hockey League; Women's Irish Hockey League

Pembroke Wanderers Hockey Club (Club Haca Pheambróg in Irish) is a field hockey club based in the Sandymount/Ballsbridge area of Dublin 4, Ireland. The club was founded in 1922 and named for the area of Pembroke, Dublin. The club's senior men's team plays in the Men's Irish Hockey League and the Men's Irish Senior Cup. The club's senior women's team plays in the Women's Irish Hockey League and the Women's Irish Senior Cup. Reserve teams play in the Irish Junior Cup and the Women's Irish Junior Cup. Pembroke has also represented Ireland in European competitions. They won the 2009 EuroHockey Club Trophy.

== History ==
=== Men's Irish Senior Cup ===
Pembroke Wanderers won the Men's Irish Senior Cup for the first time in 1933.

Season	Winners	Score	Runners up
1933	Pembroke Wanderers	2–0	Banbridge
1937	Pembroke Wanderers	3–1 (Note: After replay. First game was 0–0 after two periods of extra time.)	Queen's University Belfast
1952	Lisnagarvey	4–3 (Note: After extra time.)	Pembroke Wanderers
1966	Lisnagarvey	3–0	Pembroke Wanderers
1967	Cork Church of Ireland	2–1	Pembroke Wanderers
1973	Pembroke Wanderers	1–0	Cork Church of Ireland
1997	Lisnagarvey	4–3	Pembroke Wanderers
2000	Pembroke Wanderers	3–3 (Note: After extra time. Pembroke Wanderers won 4–3 on penalties.)	Lisnagarvey
2002	Instonians	2–1	Pembroke Wanderers
2008	Pembroke Wanderers	3–0	Monkstown
2009	Pembroke Wanderers	6–0	Cookstown
2013	Monkstown	5–4	Pembroke Wanderers
2014	Three Rock Rovers	2–2 (Note: After extra time. Three Rock Rovers won on penalties.)	Pembroke Wanderers
2018	Three Rock Rovers	5–2	Pembroke Wanderers

=== Men's Irish Hockey League ===
Season	Winners	Score	Runners up
2008–09	Pembroke Wanderers	(Note: Pembroke Wanderers win 2–1 after shoot-out.)	Glenanne
2009–10	Pembroke Wanderers		Lisnagarvey

Notes

=== Men's Irish Junior Cup ===
Season	Winners	Score	Runners up
1926	Pembroke Wanderers II	1–0 (Note: After four periods of extra time.)	Athlone
1938	Pembroke Wanderers II		
1942	Pembroke Wanderers II	4–0	Mossley
1948	Antrim II	3–2	Pembroke Wanderers II
1949	Banbridge II	1–0	Pembroke Wanderers II
1961	Pembroke Wanderers II	2–0	Catholic Institute II
1970	Lisnagarvey II	1–0 (Note: After replay. First match finished 0–0.)	Pembroke Wanderers II
1994	Banbridge II	4–0	Pembroke Wanderers II
1996	Pembroke Wanderers II	1–0	Banbridge II
2001	Pembroke Wanderers II	2–1	Lisnagarvey II
2002	Annadale II	2–1	Pembroke Wanderers II
2007	Pembroke Wanderers II	3–1	Cork Harlequins II
2008	Pembroke Wanderers II	3–2	Annadale II
2009	Cork Church of Ireland II	5–1	Pembroke Wanderers II
2014	Pembroke Wanderers II		Monkstown II
2018	Glenanne II	3–2	Pembroke Wanderers II

=== Women's Irish Senior Cup ===
Pembroke Wanderers won the Women's Irish Senior Cup for the first time in 1931.

Season	Winners	Score	Runners up
1931	Pembroke Wanderers		
1937	Pembroke Wanderers	3–0 (Note: After replay, first game finished 1–1.)	Ards
1947	Pembroke Wanderers		
1948	Pembroke Wanderers	2–1	Knock
1949	Pembroke Wanderers	4–0	Owls
1950	Pembroke Wanderers	4–1	Ashton
1952	Pembroke Wanderers		
1965	Pembroke Wanderers	5–3	Instonians
1967	Pembroke Wanderers	1–0	Old Ursulines
1970	Pembroke Wanderers	2–1	Old Ursulines
1973	Pembroke Wanderers		
1975	Pembroke Wanderers	1–0	Pegasus
1988	Old Alexandra		Pembroke Wanderers
2007	Pegasus	1–0	Pembroke Wanderers
2013–14	UCD	2–0	Pembroke Wanderers

=== Women's Irish Junior Cup ===
Season	Winners	Score	Runners up
1956	Pembroke Wanderers A	5–1	Ormiston
1959	Pembroke Wanderers III	2–1	Instonians B
1961	Pembroke Wanderers III	7–0	Waterford
1962	Pembroke Wanderers III	2–0	Pegasus
1986	Pembroke Wanderers II		
1987	Pembroke Wanderers II		
1994	Pembroke Wanderers II		
2012	Loreto	2–0	Pembroke Wanderers II
2013	Pembroke Wanderers II		Lisnagarvey
2014	UCD	3–1	Pembroke Wanderers
2015	Pembroke Wanderers	3–1	Bandon
2017	Railway Union	2–0	Pembroke Wanderers

=== Pembroke in Europe ===
==== Men ====
Tournaments	Place
1974 EuroHockey Club Champions Cup	11th
1996 Champions Cup	4th
1998 Cup Winners Cup	2nd
2001 Cup Winners Cup	3rd
2002 Champions Cup	2nd
2007 EuroHockey Club Champions Trophy	Winners
2007–08 Euro Hockey League	
2009 EuroHockey Club Trophy	Winners
2009–10 Euro Hockey League	last 16
2010–11 Euro Hockey League	last 16

==== Women ====
Tournaments	Place
2008 European Cup Winners Cup	2nd

23/24 U-14 Team

== Notable players ==
=== Men's internationals ===
Ireland

- Harry Cahill
- George Davie
- Francis de Rosa
- Paddy Dolan
- Devin Donnelly
- Gordon Elliott
- Maurice Elliot
- Ronan Flannery
- Bob Galway
- Ronan Gormley
- Conor Harte
- David Harte
- Nigel Henderson
- Edwin Hilton
- John Jermyn
- Tim Lewis
- Brian Nugent
- Stuart Loughrey
- Jamie McBride
- Johnny McCarthy
- Louis McMullan
- Des Medcalf
- Victor Mooney
- Peter Murphy
- Ian O'Keeffe
- Red Power
- Dan Shanahan
- Justin Sheriff
- Kirk Shimmins
- Alan Sothern
- Harry Spain
- Richard Willis

Scotland

- Paddy Conlon

Great Britain

- Harry Cahill: 1960, 1964, 1968

South Africa

- Craig Fulton
- Ian Symons

=== Women's internationals ===
Ireland

When Ireland won the silver medal at the 2018 Women's Hockey World Cup, the squad included two Pembroke Wanderers players, Gillian Pinder and Emily Beatty.

- Emily Beatty
- Eileen Byrne
- Irene Cahill
- Sheila Davidson
- Hilary de Lacy
- Anta Docherty
- Dorothy Donaldson
- Rita Donnelly
- Katherine Doyle
- Mary Goode
- Emer Harte
- Louise Henderson
- Gwen Jackson
- Nicky King
- Maeve Kyle
- Margaret Lennon
- Carmel McCarroll
- Joan McCarroll
- Patricia McHugh
- Debbie McNulty
- Louisa Moore
- Mary Murphy
- Aisling Naughton
- Helen O'Neill
- Vizi Paeglitis
- Gillian Pinder
- Betty Rickard
- Diana Rowell
- Mary Sweeney
- Mary Taaffe
- Rionach Tierney
- Jackie Tyson
- Nell Whiteside

South Africa

- Natalie Fulton

== Honours ==
=== Men ===
- EuroHockey Club Trophy
  - Winners: 2009: 1
- EuroHockey Club Champions Trophy
  - Winners: 2007: 1
- Men's Irish Hockey League
  - Winners: 2008–09, 2009–10: 2
- All-Ireland Club Championship
  - Winners: 1995, 2001, 2006, 2007: 4
- Men's Irish Senior Cup
  - Winners: 1933, 1937, 1973, 2000, 2008, 2009: 6
  - Runners Up: 1952, 1966, 1967, 1997, 2002, 2013, 2014, 2018 : 8
- Irish Junior Cup
  - Winners: 1926, 1938, 1942, 1961, 1996, 2001, 2007, 2008: 8
  - Runners Up: 1948, 1949, 1970, 1994, 2002, 2009, 2018: 7
- Leinster Senior League
  - Winners: 1935, 1936, 1942, 1947, 1951, 1964, 1965, 1994, 1995, 1997, 1998, 1999, 2001, 2004, 2005, 2009, 2013: 17
- Leinster Senior Cup
  - Winners: 1938, 1941, 1944, 1945, 1946, 1947, 1949, 1950, 1973, 1975, 1976, 1977, 1998, 1999, 2000, 2001, 2003, 2006, 2010: 19
- Railway Cup
  - Winners: 1940, 1941, 1942, 1959, 1970, 1974, 1979, 1980, 1981, 1985, 1988, 2001, 2004, 2007, 2008: 15
- Leinster Indoor Cup
  - Winners: 1986, 2007: 2

=== Women ===
- European Cup Winners Cup
  - Runners Up: 2008: 1
- Women's Irish Senior Cup
  - Winners: 1931, 1937, 1947, 1948, 1949, 1950, 1952, 1965, 1967, 1970, 1973, 1975: 12
  - Runners Up: 1988, 2007, 2013–14: 3
- Women's Irish Junior Cup
  - Winners: 1956, 1959, 1961, 1962, 1986, 1987, 1994, 1998, 2013, 2015: 10
  - Runners Up: 2012, 2014, 2017: 3
- Irish Junior League
  - Winners: 1998
- Leinster Senior League
  - Winners: 1931, 1936, 1939, 1940, 1942, 1949, 1952, 1958, 1963, 1966, 1969, 1970, 1971, 1972, 1973, 1974, 1975: 17
- Leinster Senior Cup
  - Winners: 1931, 1944, 1949, 1967, 1970, 1973, 1984, 2003: 8
