= Old Alex Hockey Club =

Irish women's field hockey club

- Union: Hockey Ireland
- Full name: Old Alexandra Hockey Club
- Founded: 1893
- Ground: Alexandra College; Milltown, Dublin; Ireland
- Coach: Ivan Ovington
- Website: oldalexhc.ie
- League: Women's Irish Hockey League

Old Alex Hockey Club is a women's field hockey club based at Alexandra College in Milltown, Dublin, Ireland. The club enters teams in the Women's Irish Hockey League, the Women's Irish Senior Cup and the Women's Irish Junior Cup. The club was founded in 1893 as Alexandra Hockey Club. It claims to be the oldest women's field hockey club in Ireland. In 1947 it was renamed Old Alexandra Hockey Club.

== History ==
=== Early years ===
Old Alex was founded in 1893 as Alexandra Hockey Club. It claims to be the oldest women's field hockey club in Ireland. It was originally a field hockey and tennis club for past and present pupils of Alexandra College. The club played their first game on Saint Patrick's Day in 1893 against Merton Hockey Club. Initially the subscription fee was two shillings and six pence and only Alexandra College pupils were allowed to join. In 1894 the club become founder members of the Irish Ladies Hockey Union. Two club members, Miss Story and Miss Lyster, arranged the union's first meeting at Alexandra College. In 1947 the club was renamed Old Alexandra Hockey Club and in 1960 it became an open club, allowing players with no previous connection to the College to join.

=== Irish Senior Cup ===
Old Alex won the Women's Irish Senior Cup for the first time in 1906.

Season	Winners	Score	Runners up
1906	Alexandra	4–3	Cork Ladies
1907	Alexandra		
1922	Alexandra	5–0	Waterford
1924	Alexandra	(Note: After replay. First game finished 2–2 after extra time.)	Knock
1925	Knock	2–1	Alexandra
1934	Cork Ladies		Alexandra
1986	Portadown	1–0 (Note: After replay. First game finished 1–1.)	Old Alexandra
1988	Old Alexandra		Pembroke Wanderers
1991	Old Alexandra		Muckross
1998	Pegasus	5–0	Old Alexandra
2006	Hermes	1–0	Old Alexandra

=== Women's Irish Hockey League ===
During the 2010s Old Alex regularly played in the Women's Irish Hockey League. After several seasons outside the national league, Old Alex gained promotion in 2018 after defeating Dublin University 2–1 in a promotion/relegation playoff.

=== Irish Junior Cup ===
Old Alex's second team enter the Women's Irish Junior Cup.

Season	Winners	Score	Runners up
1915	Alexandra II		
1920	Alexandra II		
1921	Alexandra II		
1998	Pegasus II		Old Alexandra II
2005	Loreto II	1–0	Old Alexandra II
2007	Old Alexandra II	2–0	Bray
2010	Randalstown II	3–1	Old Alexandra II

== Home grounds ==
Old Alex are based at Alexandra College. The club has hosted interprovincial and international games. On 2 March 1896 the club hosted the first ever women's international field hockey match when Ireland defeated England 2–0.

== Notable former players ==
=== Internationals ===
Ireland

When the Ireland women's national field hockey team won the silver medal at the 2018 Women's Hockey World Cup, the squad included two former Old Alex players – Emily Beatty and Shirley McCay.

- Emily Beatty
- Jeamie Deacon
- Nicky King
- Shirley McCay

United States

- Jessica Jecko

=== Umpire ===
- Carol Metchette

== First team coaches ==
Years	
2018–	Ivan Ovington
2017–2018	Nicky King
2016–2017	Tarrin Ramsden
2015–2016	Nicky King
2013–2015	Didi Cole
2012–2013	Miles Warren
2010–2012	Miles Warren and Ivan Ovington
1980s	David Judge

== Honours ==
- Women's Irish Senior Cup
  - Winners: 1906, 1907, 1922, 1924, 1988, 1991: 6
  - Runners Up: 1925, 1934, 1986, 1998, 2006 : 5
- Women's Irish Junior Cup
  - Winners: 1915, 1920, 1921, 2007: 4
  - Runners Up: 1998, 2005, 2010: 3
