= Kirk Shimmins =

Irish field hockey player

Personal information
- Full name: Kirk Raymond Shimmins
- Born: 1 June 1994 (age 32)
- Height: 5 ft 9 in (175 cm)

Sport
- Sport: Field hockey
- Position: Midfielder
- Club: Dragons
Youth career
- Team
- –: Pembroke Wanderers
Senior career
Years	Team	Caps	Goals
–	Pembroke Wanderers	-	-
–	UCD	-	-
–2018	Pembroke Wanderers	-	-
2018–	Dragons	-	-
National team
Years	Team	Caps	Goals
2013–	Ireland	106	-
Medal record
Men's field hockey
Representing Ireland
EuroHockey Championships
Bronze medal – third place	2015 London	Team
- Updated on 11 December 2018

Kirk Raymond Shimmins (born 1 June 1994) is an Irish field hockey player who plays as a midfielder for Belgian club KHC Dragons and the Irish national team.

He competed for the Ireland men's national field hockey team at the 2016 Summer Olympics. He played at the youth levels of Pembroke Wanderers and has played club hockey in Ireland until 2018 when he transferred to KHC Dragons in the Men's Belgian Hockey League.
