= Loreto Hockey Club =

Field hockey club in Dublin, Ireland

- Union: Hockey Ireland
- Full name: Loreto Hockey Club
- Founded: 1926
- Ground: Loreto High School Beaufort; Grange Road; Rathfarnham; Dublin 14
- Coach: Paul Fitzpatrick
- Website: http://www.loretohockeyclub.ie
- League: Women's Irish Hockey League

Loreto Hockey Club is a women's field hockey club based in Rathfarnham, Dublin 14, Ireland. The club enter teams in the Women's Irish Hockey League, the Irish Senior Cup and the Irish Junior Cup. Loreto has also represented Ireland in European competitions, winning the 2011 EuroHockey Club Champion's Challenge II and finishing third at the 2014 European Club Championship Trophy.

== History ==
=== Early years ===
Loreto Hockey Club was founded in 1926 by Mother Bernadette and Una Murray to represent past pupils of Loreto schools in Ireland. The club adopted the red wine and white of Loreto College, St Stephen's Green as their club colours. Loreto won its first trophy, the Leinster Cup, in 1946.

=== Irish Senior Cup ===
Loreto have been regular Irish Senior Cup finalists. On 9 May 2010, with a team that included Nicola Daly, Hannah Matthews, Nikki Symmons, Lizzie Colvin and Alison Meeke, Loreto won the cup after they defeated Railway Union in a penalty shoot-out after the game had finished 2–2. The team was coached by Graham Shaw. Loreto were finalists again in 2012 but this time lost 3–2 against UCD.

	2–1	Ashton	
1955	Instonians	3–1	Loreto
1957	St Dominic's Past Pupils	2–1	Loreto
1958	Loreto	8–0	Old Ursulines
1960	Loreto	3–0	Instonians
1977	Portadown	2–1	Loreto
1993	Portadown	2–0	Loreto
2002	Loreto	2–2 (Note: Loreto won 3–1 after penalty shoot-out)	Hermes
2003	Loreto	3–2 (Note: After extra time)	Cork Harlequins
2009–10	Loreto	2–2 (Note: Loreto won 4–2 after penalty shoot-out)	Railway Union
2011–12	UCD	3–2	Loreto
2018-19	Cork Harlequins	2-2	Loreto

=== Women's Irish Hockey League ===
In 2008–09 Loreto, with a team that included Nikki Symmons, Lizzie Colvin, Hannah Matthews and Alison Meeke, won the inaugural Women's Irish Hockey League title. In the league final they defeated a Hermes team that included Nicola Evans, Anna O'Flanagan, Gillian Pinder and Chloe Watkins. Loreto won 2–1 in a penalty shoot-out, becoming the first team in the world to win a title with the new one-on-one format.

Season	Winners	Score	Runners up
2008–09	Loreto	(Note: Loreto won 2–1 after penalty shoot-out)	Hermes
2011–12	Railway Union		Loreto
2012–13	Railway Union	(Note: Railway Union won after a penalty shoot-out)	Loreto
2014–15	Pegasus	1–1 (Note: Pegasus won 4–2 after a penalty shoot-out)	Loreto

Notes

=== EY Champions Trophy ===
Loreto won the 2018 EY Champions Trophy and, as a result, qualified to represent Ireland in the 2019 EuroHockey Club Champions Cup.

Year	Winners	Score	Runners up
2018	Loreto	2–1	Cork Harlequins

=== Irish Junior Cup ===
Loreto's second team enter the Irish Junior Cup. They won the cup in 2012 and were runners-up in 2016.

Year	Winners	Score	Runners up
1946	Loreto		
1948	Loreto		
1955	Loreto	1–1 (Note: Loreto and Sandown, Belfast shared the trophy)	Sandown, Belfast
2005	Loreto	1–0	Old Alexandra II
2012	Loreto	2–0	Pembroke Wanderers
2016	Queens University	3–2	Loreto

=== Loreto in Europe ===
Loreto has also represented Ireland in European competitions on several occasions. In 2011, with a team that included Nicola Daly, Nikki Symmons, Hannah Matthews and Alison Meeke, Loreto won the EuroHockey Club Champion's Challenge II in Lille. In the final they defeated HC Olten of Switzerland 7–1. In 2014 Hannah Matthews captained Loreto to third place at the European Club Championship Trophy tournament hosted by Leicester Hockey Club.

== Grounds ==
The club was originally based in Dartmouth Square. In the 1930s, the club moved to Cherryfield, then in Templeogue, and played on a pitch which was actually a field at the back of one of the club member's houses. In the mid-1940s, the club moved to the grounds of the Leinster Branch of the Irish Hockey Union near Ballyboden St. Enda's GAA. During the 1950s, 1960s and 1970s, the club remained at the Leinster Branch grounds, sharing the six pitches there with four other clubs. When the Leinster Branch grounds were sold for development in the early 1980s, the club was homeless again. The Sisters of Loreto gave the club access to the pitch at Loreto Abbey, Rathfarnham. In 1987, with the Sisters' support and after much fundraising, the club laid a floodlit all-weather pitch at Nutgrove School. In the 1997–98 season, the club laid its own astro-turf pitch in partnership with the Loreto Beaufort School. The playing surface on the pitch was replaced in September 2006 with a sand-dressed pitch. In 2017–18 the club successfully applied to the Department of Transport, Tourism and Sport for a €150,000 grant to upgrade the pitch. In 2013, the club opened a new clubhouse, becoming the first women-only hockey club in Ireland to have its own purpose-built clubhouse.

== Notable players ==
Ireland internationals

When the Ireland women's national field hockey team won the silver medal at the 2018 Women's Hockey World Cup, the squad included five current or former Loreto players. Nicola Daly, Hannah Matthews and Alison Meeke were all members of Loreto's 2017–18 squad. Lizzie Colvin and Elena Tice were both former Loreto players.

- Mary Barnwell
- Lizzie Colvin
- Nicola Daly
- Louisa Healy
- Hannah Matthews
- Cathy McKean
- Alison Meeke
- Caitriona O'Kelly
- Ann Murray
- Aoife Pomeroy
- Sarah Rand
- Niamh Small
- Nikki Symmons
- Elena Tice
- Sarah Torrans

Ireland women's cricket internationals

- Nikki Symmons
- Elena Tice

== Notable coaches ==
- (Ireland) Graham Shaw

== Honours ==
- EuroHockey Club Champion's Challenge II
  - Winners: 2011: 1
- Women's Irish Hockey League
  - Winners: 2008–09: 1
  - Runners Up: 2011–12, 2012–13, 2014–15: 3
- Irish Senior Cup
  - Winners: 1940, 1946, 1953, 1960, 2001–02, 2002–03, 2009–10: 8
  - Runners Up: 1955, 1957, 1977, 1993, 2011–12: 5
- Irish Junior Cup
  - Winners: 1946, 1948, 1955, 2005, 2012: 5
  - Runners Up: 2016: 1
- EY Champions Trophy
  - Winners: 2018, 2022-23
