= 1970 EuroHockey Club Champions Cup =

The 1970 EuroHockey Club Champions Cup was the second unofficial edition of Europe's premier field hockey competition. It took place in Terrassa as a group stage, which was won again by hosts and defending champions CD Terrassa.

== Standings ==
1. (Spain) CD Terrassa
2. (Netherlands) Larensche MHC
3. (Belgium) Royal Leopold Club
4. (West Germany) SC 1880 Frankfurt
5. Cork Church of Ireland
6. (France) Lyon
7. (Czechoslovakia) TJ Prague
8. (Italy) MDA Roma
9. (Switzerland) Red Sox Zürich
