= Nicola Skrastin =

Scottish field hockey player

Nicola Alexandra Skrastin (born 16 September 1992), is a Scottish hockey player. Nicola was born in the Vale of Leven in Argyll and Bute and grew up close to the town of Helensburgh. She attended Rhu Primary school and then Lomond School. Skrastin's potential was first noted by school PE teacher Margery Taylor, who urged her to start playing in the Glasgow hockey scene. As captain of the School 1st XI, Nicola balanced the pressures of her school life and early hockey career. Skrastin obtained a place to study Geography and Business at the University of Glasgow and has since taken a year out from her studies in order to train full-time with the Scottish team.

Skrastin has 36 caps for the Women's National Team, having made her senior international debut on 27 May 2012 against South Africa, aged just 19.

Skrastin is a key player for Glasgow Western and the poster girl for the 2014 Commonwealth Games. A mural of Skrastin can be found on a wall close to Partick station in Glasgow.

Skrastin featured in the Scotland squad for the 2014 Commonwealth Games.
