= Hermes Ladies' Hockey Club =

Women's field hockey club at St. Andrew's College, Booterstown, Ireland

- Union: Hockey Ireland
- Full name: Hermes Ladies' Hockey Club
- Founded: 1966
- Ground: St. Andrew's College; Booterstown; Dún Laoghaire–Rathdown; Ireland
- League: Women's Irish Hockey League

Hermes Ladies' Hockey Club was a women's field hockey club based at St. Andrew's College in Booterstown, Dún Laoghaire–Rathdown, Ireland. The club entered teams in the Women's Irish Hockey League, the Irish Senior Cup and the Irish Junior Cup. In 2016 Hermes merged with the women's team at Monkstown Hockey Club and subsequently played as Hermes-Monkstown. As Hermes-Monkstown, the club represented Ireland in the 2017 EuroHockey Club Champions Cup.

== History ==
=== Old Wesley Hockey Club ===
Hermes Ladies' Hockey Club was a successor club of the Old Wesley Hockey Club, originally founded by former pupils of Wesley College. During the 1950s and early 1960s, Old Wesley played at Leinster intermediate level. Traditionally Old Wesley recruited players from Protestant schools. However, in order to make the move to senior status, the club decided to expand its membership to the wider community and change its name. In April 1966 Old Wesley was relaunched as Hermes Ladies' Hockey Club, taking Old Wesley's place in the Leinster Senior Division.

=== Irish Senior Cup ===
Hermes won the Irish Senior Cup for the first time in 1997, defeating Muckross 2–1 in the final. They won a second Irish Senior Cup in 1999 defeating Pegasus 3–2 in the final. They were cup winners on two further occasions in 2005 and 2006.

Season	Winners	Score	Runners up
1974	Pegasus	2–0	Hermes
1997	Hermes	2–1	Muckross
1999	Hermes	3–2	Pegasus
2000	Cork Harlequins	2–1	Hermes
2002	Loreto	2–2 (Note: Loreto won 3–1 after penalty shoot-out)	Hermes
2004	Pegasus	2–1	Hermes
2005	Hermes	2–2 (Note: Hermes won 4–3 after penalty shoot-out)	Ballymoney
2006	Hermes	1–0	Old Alexandra
2010–11	Pegasus	3–1	Hermes
2014–15	Ulster Elks	1–0	Hermes

=== All-Ireland Club Championship ===
Hermes won the All-Ireland Club Championship on four occasions, in 2003, 2004, 2006 and 2008. In 2008 with a team that included Anna O'Flanagan, Chloe Watkins and Nicola Evans, all still schoolgirls, Hermes won the title after defeating Loreto in the final.

Season	Winners	Score	Runners up
2003	Hermes		
2004	Hermes		
2006	Hermes		Pegasus
2007	Pegasus	3–1	Hermes
2008	Hermes	1–0 (Note: Hermes won after golden goal)	Loreto

=== Women's Irish Hockey League ===
In 2008–09 Hermes were founder members of the Women's Irish Hockey League. With a team that included Nicola Evans, Anna O'Flanagan, Gillian Pinder and Chloe Watkins, they finished the season as runners up, after losing 2–1 in a penalty shoot-out in the league final against Loreto. Hermes were runners up again in 2010–11, losing 4–1 in the final to Pegasus. In 2015–16, with a team that included Evans, O'Flanagan and Watkins, Hermes won the league title and the EY Champions Trophy. In 2016 Hermes merged with Monkstown and the ladies' team subsequently played as Hermes-Monkstown.

Season	Winners	Score	Runners up
2008–09	Loreto	(Note: Loreto won 2–1 after penalty shoot-out)	Hermes
2010–11	Pegasus	4–1	Hermes
2015–16	Hermes	n/a	Pegasus
2016–17	UCD	n/a	Hermes-Monkstown

Notes

=== EY Champions Trophy ===
Year	Winners	Score	Runners up
2016	Hermes	3–1	Pegasus
2017	UCD	1–1 (Note: UCD won 3–0 after penalty shoot-out)	Hermes-Monkstown

Notes

=== Irish Junior Cup ===
Hermes second team entered the Irish Junior Cup.

Season	Winners	Score	Runners up
1979	Hermes II		
2004	Pegasus II		Hermes II
2006	Hermes II	2–1	Lurgan
2009	Hermes II (Note: Hermes II won 3–1 after penalty shoot-out)	1–1	Railway Union II

=== Hermes in Europe ===
Hermes represented Ireland in European competitions on six occasions. After winning the 1997 Irish Senior Cup they played in the European Cup Winners Cup A Division in Belgium. After winning the 1999 Irish Senior Cup, Hermes finished in third place at the 2000 European Cup Winners Cup A Division tournament in Cologne. In 2012, with a team that featured Mary Goode, Audrey O'Flynn and Gillian Pinder, Hermes won the Women's EuroHockey Club Champion's Challenge I, defeating Lille Metropole 3–1 in the final. After winning the 2016 EY Champions Trophy as Hermes, they played in the 2017 EuroHockey Club Champions Cup as Hermes-Monkstown.

== Notable former players ==
Ireland internationals

When the Ireland women's national field hockey team won the silver medal at the 2018 Women's Hockey World Cup, the squad included five former Hermes players – Deirdre Duke, Nicola Evans, Anna O'Flanagan, Gillian Pinder and Chloe Watkins.

- Tara Browne
- Jenny Burke
- Catriona Carey
- Naomi Carroll
- Linda Caulfield
- Fiona Connery
- Carol Devine
- Gwen Doherty
- Deirdre Duke
- Nicola Evans
- Kristin Farrell
- Mary Goode
- Sarah Hilliard
- Jill Hodgins
- Lisa Jacob
- Nicola King
- Mary Logue
- Anna O'Flanagan
- Audrey O'Flynn
- Gillian Pinder
- Christine Quinlan
- Daphne Sixsmith
- Chloe Watkins

== Honours ==
- Women's Irish Hockey League
  - Winners: 2015–16: 1
  - Runners Up: 2008–09, 2010–11, 2016–17 : 3
- EY Champions Trophy
  - Winners: 2016
  - Runners Up: 2017
- All-Ireland Club Championship
  - Winners: 2003, 2004, 2006, 2008: 4
- Irish Senior Cup
  - Winners: 1997, 1999, 2005, 2006: 4
  - Runners Up: 1974, 2000, 2002, 2004, 2010–11, 2014–15 : 6
- Leinster Senior Cup
  - Winners: 1973–74, 1977–78: 2
- Irish Junior Cup
  - Winners: 1979, 2006, 2009: 3
  - Runners Up: 2004: 1
- Women's EuroHockey Club Champion's Challenge I
  - Winners: 2012
