= Leinster Schoolgirls' Senior Cup (field hockey) =

- Organiser(s): Leinster Hockey Association
- Founded: 1917
- Region: Leinster
- Current champions: Wesley College
- Most championships: Wesley College (13 titles)
- Website: leinsterschoolgirls.com

The Leinster Schoolgirls' Senior Cup is a women's field hockey cup competition organized by the Leinster Hockey Association. It features teams representing schools from Leinster. The competition was established in 1917. Alexandra College are the competitions most successful team, winning the cup for the thirteenth time in 2016. During the 2000s and 2010s, Alexandra College and St. Andrew's College have emerged as the competitions two strongest teams. When Ireland won the silver medal at the 2018 Women's Hockey World Cup, the squad included eight players who had featured in Leinster Schoolgirls' Senior Cup finals. Chloe Watkins played in four finals while Nicola Evans, Gillian Pinder, Hannah Matthews and Emily Beatty all played in three each. Deirdre Duke and Elena Tice both played in two each while Nicola Daly made one appearance. Between 2005 and 2012 at least one member of the squad played in every final.

== Ireland's silver medallists ==
When Ireland won the silver medal at the 2018 Women's Hockey World Cup, the squad included eight players who had played in Leinster Schoolgirls' Senior Cup finals. In the 2005 final Nicola Evans scored the opening goal in a 4–2 win for Alexandra College over a High School, Dublin team that included Nicola Daly. In the 2006 final 13-year-old Chloe Watkins scored St. Andrew's College's second goal in a 2–0 win over a Loreto, Beaufort team that included Hannah Matthews. In 2007 Nicola Evans scored again for Alexandra College in a 5–0 win against a St. Andrew's College team that included Chloe Watkins and Gillian Pinder. In 2008 Hannah Matthews scored the winner from a penalty corner as Loreto Beaufort defeated an Alexandra College team featuring Nicola Evans and Deirdre Duke 2–1. In 2009 Matthews captained Loreto, Beaufort as they faced a St. Andrew's team featuring Chloe Watkins and Gillian Pinder. This time St. Andrew's won 2–0 after extra time. In 2010 Chloe Watkins captained St. Andrew's as they defeated an Alexandra College team that featured Deirdre Duke and Emily Beatty. Gillian Pinder scored the opening goal in a 2–0 win. In 2011 the same two teams again featured in the final. This time Alexandra College with Duke and Beatty defeated a St. Andrew's College team that included Pinder 2–1. In 2012 Emily Beatty scored the opening goal as Alexandra College defeated Wesley College 4–1. Elena Tice scored the winner as St Gerard's School, Bray won the cup for the first time in 2015. She also played in the 2016 final but finished on the losing team.

== Recent finals ==
Year	Winners	Result	Runners up	Venue
2019	St. Andrew's College	1–1 (Note: St. Andrew's College win 3–2 after a penalty shoot-out.)	Wesley College	Grange Road
2018	Loreto College, Foxrock	1–0	St. Andrew's College	UCD
2017	Muckross Park College	2–1	St Gerard's School, Bray	Grange Road
2016	Alexandra College	4–2	St Gerard's School, Bray	Grange Road
2015	St Gerard's School, Bray	1–0	Alexandra College	Grange Road
2014	St. Andrew's College	1–1 (Note: St. Andrew's College win 3–2 after a penalty shoot-out.)	Rathdown School	Grange Road
2013	Mount Anville	1–0	Rathdown School	Grange Road
2012	Alexandra College	4–1	Wesley College	Grange Road
2011	Alexandra College	2–1 (Note: Alexandra College win with silver goal in extra time.)	St. Andrew's College	Grange Road
2010	St. Andrew's College	2–0	Alexandra College	Grange Road
2009	St. Andrew's College	2–0 (Note: After extra time.)	Loreto, Beaufort	
2008	Loreto, Beaufort	2–1	Alexandra College	
2007	Alexandra College	5–0	St. Andrew's College	
2006	St. Andrew's College	2–0	Loreto, Beaufort	
2005	Alexandra College	4–2	The High School, Dublin	Grange Road
2004	St. Andrew's College		Alexandra College	
2003	St. Andrew's College		The King's Hospital	
2002	Mount Anville		Muckross Park College	
2001	Loreto, Bray		Muckross Park College	
2000	Loreto, Bray		The High School, Dublin	
1999	Mount Anville		Wesley College	
1998	Wesley College	(Note: Wesley College team featured Nikki Symmons.)	Mount Anville	
1978	Alexandra College			
1977	Loreto College, Foxrock			

Notes
