= Women's Irish Junior Cup (field hockey) =

The logo of the Irish Hockey Association.

The Women's Irish Junior Cup is a knockout trophy played for by women's field hockey clubs in Ireland, under the auspices of the Irish Hockey Association. Entry is open to sides that do not qualify for the Women's Irish Senior Cup and to the second teams of clubs that play in the Irish Senior Cup. The trophy was first played for in 1909.

== Trophy ==
The winners are presented with the White Cup. The trophy was presented to the Irish Ladies Hockey Union in 1909 by Mrs .... White LLD.

== Historical format ==
From its start in 1909 until 2000, the tournament was played in regional tournaments. The winners of the provincial Junior Cups in Leinster and Munster, Ulster and a club from Connacht would proceed through to semi-final matches. The finals were played in one weekend until 2000.

When the Northern Ireland Ladies Hockey Union finally amalgamated with the Ulster Women's Hockey Union, the Ulster representatives were decided by the McConnell Shield competition.

== Current format ==
In 2000 the format of the competition was changed to an open draw format.

== Finals ==
(records are incomplete)

=== 1910s ===
Year	Winner			Runner-up	Notes
1909	Phoenix				
1910	Waringstown	4	2	Monkstown	
1911	Orwell				
1912	Ballinasloe				
1913					
1914	Celbridge College				
1915	Alexandra II				
1916	Not Played due to World War I				
1917	Not Played due to World War I				
1918	Not Played due to World War I				
1919	Not Played due to World War I				

=== 1920s ===
Year	Winner			Runner-up	Notes
1920	Alexandra II				
1921	Alexandra II				
1922	Royal College of Surgeons Ireland				
1923	Maids of the Mountain II				
1924	Monkstown II				
1925	Glenlola (Bangor)	2	0	Trefoil(Dublin)	
1926	North West	3	1	Optimists(Dublin)	
1927	Cancelled by ILHU - lack of funds				
1928	Instonians	6	0	Cork Ladies	
1929	Holywood	7	0	Ursuline Convent	

=== 1930s ===
Year	Winner			Runner-up	Notes
1930	Derry	6	2	Optimists(Dublin)	
1931	North West & Old Ursulines II	2	2	TROPHY SHARED	after extra time
1932	Optimists II	5	1	Newry	
1933	Old Ursulines II				
1934	North West	4	1	Bective	
1935	South Antrim	2	1	Ursuline Convent	
1936	Ewarts(Belfast)	2	1	Newcomes II	
1937	Muckross II	2	0	Stranmillis Training College	
1938	Newcomes II	1	0	Cork Wanderers	
1939	Muckross III			Carlow	

=== 1940s ===
Year	Winner			Runner-up	Notes
1940	Catholic Institute				
1941	Not Played				
1942	Not Played				
1943	Not Played				
1944	Not Played				
1945	Not Played				
1946	Loreto II			Naas	
1947	Maids II				
1948	Loreto II				
1949	Waterford	4	1	Sandown, Belfast	

=== 1950s ===
Year	Winner			Runner-up	Notes
1950	Catholic Institute, Limerick	1	0	Sandown, Belfast	
1951	Ormiston, Belfast	4	3	Waterford	3 periods of extra time
1952	Waterford				
1953	Waterford & Ormiston, Belfast	2	2	TROPHY SHARED	
1954	Waterford	4	1	Sandown, Belfast	
1955	Loreto III & Sandown, Belfast	1	1	TROPHY SHARED	
1956	Pembroke Wanderers A	5	1	Ormiston	
1957	Muckross III	1	0	Waterford	
1958	Muckross III	2	1	Waterford	
1959	Pembroke Wanderers III	2	1	Instonians B	

=== 1960s ===
Year	Winner			Runner-up	Notes
1960	Lurgan	4	1	Muckross III	
1961	Pembroke Wanderers III	7	0	Waterford	
1962	Pembroke Wanderers III	2	0	Pegasus I	
1963	Ards A	2	1	Maids II	after extra time
1964	St Raphael's			Sion Hill Training College, Dublin	
1965	St Raphael's	7	1	Instonians A	
1966	Portadown I	6	0	Railway Union II	
1967	Railway Union II	1	0	Instonians A	
1968	Old Ursulines II	1	0	Queen's University A	after extra time
1969	Pegasus II	2	0	Maids II	

=== 1970s ===
Year	Winner			Runner-up	Notes
1970	Ling II				
1971	Queen's University II	2	1	Muckross II	Replay - Game 1: 1-1
1972	Belvedere	2	1	Queen's University A	
1973	Pegasus II	1	0	Muckross II	
1974	Pegasus II	1	0	Railway Union II	
1975	Maids II			(Old Ursuline's (Cork) or Athlone)	
1976	Carrick	1	0	Railway Union II	
1977	Railway Union II				
1978	Portadown IIA	3	0	Railway Union II	Replay - Game 1: 1-1
1979	Hermes II				

=== 1980s ===
Year	Winner			Runner-up	Notes
1980	Old Ursulines II				
1981	Our Lady's				
1982	Portadown IIA	2	1	Waterford	
1983	Londonderry Ladies	1	1	Greenhills	Londonderry Ladies won 7-4 on pens
1984	Glennane				
1985	Old Ursulines II				
1986	Pembroke Wanderers II				
1987	Pembroke Wanderers II				
1988	Portadown II				
1989	Portadown II				

=== 1990s ===
Year	Winner			Runner-up	Notes
1990	Cork Harlequins II				
1991	Kilkenny II				
1992	Cork Harlequins II				
1993	Pegasus II				
1994	Pembroke Wanderers II				
1995	Pegasus II			Enniscorthy	
1996	Pegasus II	2	0	Enniscorthy	
1997	Pegasus II	2	1	Kilkenny	
1998	Pegasus II			Old Alexandra II	
1999	Our Lady's			Cork Church of Ireland II	

=== 2000s ===
Year	Winner			Runner-up	Notes
2000	Pegasus II			Kilkenny	
2001	Enniscorthy			Three Rock Rovers II	
2002	Hermes II	2	0	Pegasus II	
2003	Pegasus II	3	0	Three Rock Rovers II	
2004	Pegasus II			Hermes II	
2005	Loreto II	1	0	Old Alexandra II	
2006	Hermes II	2	1	Lurgan	
2007	Old Alexandra II	2	0	Bray	
2008	Glennane	5	1	Railway Union II	
2009	Hermes II	1	1	Railway Union II	after extra time, 3-1 on penalties

=== 2010s ===
Year	Winner			Runner-up	Notes
2010	Randalstown II	3	1	Old Alexandra II	
2011	Railway Union			Lisnagarvey	
2012	Loreto	2	0	Pembroke Wanderers	
2013	Pembroke Wanderers			Lisnagarvey	
2014	UCD	3	1	Pembroke Wanderers	
2015	Pembroke Wanderers	3	1	Bandon	
2016	Queens University	3	2	Loreto	
2017	Railway Union	2	0	Pembroke Wanderers	
2018	Railway Union	2	0	UCD	
2019	UCD			Railway Union	

=== 2020s ===
Year	Winner	Runner-up	Notes
2020	Pembroke Wanderers	Old Alexandra II	
2021	not played		
2022	Corinthians	Pembroke Wanderers	
2023	Corinthians	UCD	
2024	Railway Union	Loreto	
2025	Pembroke Wanderers	Catholic Institute	
2026	Old Alexandra	Railway Union	
