= Cork Harlequins =

Multi-sports club in Cork, Ireland

- Union: Hockey Ireland; Cricket Ireland → Munster Cricket Union
- Full name: Cork Harlequins Hockey and Cricket Club
- Founded: 1925
- Ground: Harlequin Park; Farmers Cross; Cork; Ireland
- Website: corkharlequins.com
- League: Women's Irish Hockey League

Cork Harlequins Hockey and Cricket Club is a multi-sports club based in Cork City in Ireland. The club was founded in 1925. Although Harlequins is best known for its field hockey and cricket teams, during its history the club has also organised teams in various other sports including table tennis, association football, rugby union and tennis. In 2008–09 Cork Harlequins were founder members of both Men's Irish Hockey League and the Women's Irish Hockey League. As of 2018–19, the club's senior women's team played in the national league Division 1 but have played in Division 2 since 2021 and the Women's Irish Senior Cup. The club's senior men's team have also played the Men's Irish Senior Cup and were All-Ireland club champions in 2002. The senior men's team currently plays in the national league Division 2. Reserve teams play in the Men's Irish Junior Cup and the Women's Irish Junior Cup. Cork Harlequins have also represented Ireland in European competitions.

== History ==
=== Women's field hockey ===
Cork Harlequins was founded in 1925, initially as a women's field hockey team. A group of women employed by Dowdall and O'Mahony, a dairy shop on St Patrick's Street, decided to enter a tournament at Church Road in Blackrock. The team captain chose their name after noticing the ball in their first match was made by Harlequins of London. Cork Harlequins women won the Irish Senior Cup for the first time in 2000. In 2008–09 Cork Harlequins were founder members of the Women's Irish Hockey League. In 2009–10 with a team that included Yvonne O'Byrne, Cliodhna Sargent, Rachael Kohler and Sinead McCarthy, Harlequins finished as league runners up. In 2016–17 with a team that included Yvonne O'Byrne, Roisin Upton and Naomi Carroll, Cork Harlequins were Irish Senior Cup finalists. In 2017–18 O'Byrne, Upton and Carroll helped Harlequins finish as runners up in both the national league and the EY Champions Trophy. In 2019 the team including Caoimhe Perdue won the Irish Senior Cup for the 2nd time against Loreto in the final, winning on shuttles.

Women's Irish Hockey League

Season	Winners	Score	Runners up
2009–10	Railway Union	4–0	Cork Harlequins
2017–18	UCD	n/a	Cork Harlequins

Irish Senior Cup

Year	Winners	Score	Runners up
2000	Cork Harlequins	2–1	Hermes
2003	Loreto	3–2 (Note: After extra time)	Cork Harlequins
2017 2019|| UCDCork Harlequins	1–0 2-2 win on shuttles||Cork Harlequins Loreto		

Irish Junior Cup

Year	Winners	Score	Runners up
1990	Cork Harlequins		
1992	Cork Harlequins		

=== Men's field hockey ===
Cork Harlequins men's field hockey team were All-Ireland club champions in 2002. They won the Irish Senior Cup for the first time in 2006. Their squad included schoolboys, David and Conor Harte. Cork Harlequins subsequently went onto represent Ireland in the 2007 European Cup Winners Trophy. They won the trophy after defeating Kolos Sekoia of Ukraine 4–1 in a penalty shoot-out. In 2008–09 Cork Harlequins were founder members of the Men's Irish Hockey League.

Irish Senior Cup

Season	Winners	Score	Runners up
1938	Railway Union	1–0 (Note: After replay and two periods of extra time, first game finished 0–0)	Cork Harlequins
1950	YMCA (Dublin)	4–1 (Note: After extra time)	Cork Harlequins
1991	Lisnagarvey	3–0	Cork Harlequins
1995	Instonians	2–1	Cork Harlequins
2003	Lisnagarvey	3–2	Cork Harlequins
2004	Instonians	1–0 (Note: After extra time)	Cork Harlequins
2006	Cork Harlequins	2–1	Lisnagarvey
2012	Cork Harlequins	4–3	Railway Union

Notes

Irish Junior Cup

Season	Winners	Score	Runners up
1930	Naas	6–0	Cork Harlequins
1979	Three Rock Rovers II	3–2	Cork Harlequins II
1988	Aer Lingus	2–0	Cork Harlequins II
1991	Holywood '87 II	1–0	Cork Harlequins II
1997	Avoca II	2–0	Cork Harlequins II
1999	Cork Harlequins II	5–4	Lisnagarvey II
2005	Banbridge II	2–1	Cork Harlequins II
2007	Pembroke Wanderers	3–1	Cork Harlequins II

=== Cricket ===
Cork Harlequins formed a cricket team in 1967. They enter senior, junior and minor teams in various Munster Cricket Union leagues.

== Harlequin Park ==
The land for Harlequin Park was purchased at Farmers Cross in the early 1960s from Tom Young for £900. In September 1970 the Lord Mayor of Cork opened the new club pavilion which today houses the club bar. In the 1970s a new playing pitch was developed, which became the first "grit" playing surface in the Republic of Ireland. More land was purchased and car parking and the pavilion were extended to include two new dressing rooms, a function hall and a kitchen. The grit pitch was converted into a sand based astroturf surface in 1987, the second of its kind in the Republic. In the 1980s and 1990s more land was purchased from Murphy's Caravan Park and from the Rolf family to increase the size of the facility. A second astroturf pitch was constructed in 1998. The first astroturf pitch fell into disrepair and was used as a car park for a period of time. The club now has two functioning field hockey pitches as well as cricket facilities.

== Notable players ==
=== Men's field hockey internationals ===
Ireland

- Ivan Bateman
- Wesley Bateman
- Jason Black
- Mark Black
- David Eakins
- Julian Dale
- Philip Hardy
- Sean Nicholson
- Conor Harte
- David Harte
- Paul Lombard
- Brian Long
- Sean Nicholson
- Alan O'Driscoll
- David O'Driscoll
- Ian O'Keefe

=== Women's field hockey internationals ===
Ireland

When Ireland won the silver medal at the 2018 Women's Hockey World Cup, the squad included two Cork Harlequins players, Yvonne O'Byrne and Roisin Upton.

- Rebecca Barry
- Emma Buckley
- Naomi Carroll
- Eimear Cregan
- Aoife Falvey
- Sinead McCarthy
- Mary Goode
- Sharon Hutchinson
- Sarah Kelleher
- Rachael Kohler
- Karen O Brien
- Karen O'Brien
- Yvonne O'Byrne
- Julia O'Halloran
- Cliodhna Sargent
- Roisin Upton

== Honours ==
Men's field hockey

- European Cup Winners Trophy
  - Winners: 2007: 1
- All-Ireland Club Championship
  - Winners: 2002: 1
- Irish Senior Cup
  - Winners: 2006, 2012: 2
  - Runners Up: 1938, 1950, 1991, 1995, 2003, 2004: 6
- Irish Junior Cup
  - Winners: 1999: 1
  - Runners Up: 1930, 1979, 1988, 1991, 1997, 2005, 2007: 7

Women's field hockey

- European Cup Winners Cup B Division
  - Winners: 2001
- Women's Irish Hockey League
  - Runners Up: 2009–10, 2017–18
- EY Champions Trophy
  - Runners Up: 2018
- Irish Senior Cup
  - Winners: 2000, 2018–19
  - Runners Up: 2003, 2017
- Irish Junior Cup
  - Winners: 1990, 1992
