= Pegasus Hockey Club =

Field hockey club in Northern Ireland

- Union: Hockey Ireland; Ulster Hockey Union
- Full name: Physical Education Girls and Staff Ulster College and Stranmillis Hockey Club
- Founded: 1961
- Ground: Malone RFC; 6 Gibson Park Avenue; Belfast; BT6 9GL
- Website: www.pegasushc.com
- League: Women's Irish Hockey League

Pegasus Hockey Club is a women's field hockey club based in Belfast, Northern Ireland. The club enter teams in the Women's Irish Hockey League, the Irish Senior Cup, the Irish Junior Cup and the Ulster Shield. Pegasus has also represented Ireland in European competitions. Pegasus was founded in 1961 by students and teachers from the Ulster College of Physical Education, Jordanstown and Stranmillis University College. The Pegasus name is an acronym of Physical Education Girls and Staff Ulster College and Stranmillis.

== History ==
=== Ulster Shield ===
Pegasus won the Ulster Shield for the first time in 1966–67. In 1967–68 they won their first Ulster double, winning both the Shield and the Senior League.

Season	Winners	Score	Runners up
1966–67	Pegasus	2–1	Victorians
1967–68	Pegasus	1–0 (Note: After replay. First game was 0–0 draw.)	Mid Antrim
1968–69	Pegasus	3–1	Mid Antrim
1971–72	Portadown	2–1	Pegasus
1972–73	Pegasus	3–1	Portadown
1973–74	Pegasus	4–0	Mid Antrim
1974–75	Pegasus	4–2	Ulster College of Physical Education
1975–76	Pegasus	1–0	Portadown
1976–77	Portadown	1–0	Pegasus
1977–78	Pegasus	2–1	Portadown
1978–79	Pegasus	1–0	Portadown
1980–81	Pegasus	2–1	Portadown
1981–82	Pegasus	1–0	Knock
1983–84	Pegasus	2–0	Portadown
1984–85	Portadown	2–1 (Note: After replay and extra time. First game was 0–0 draw.)	Pegasus
1986–87	Pegasus	5–2	Portadown
1987–88	Pegasus	3–0	Portadown
1988–89	Pegasus	1–0	Randalstown
1993–94	Randalstown	2–0	Pegasus
1995–96	Pegasus	3–0	Knock
1996–97	Pegasus	2–0	North Down
1997–98	Pegasus	4–0 (Note: After replay. First game was 1–1 draw.)	Randalstown
1998–99	Pegasus	5–0	Collegians
1999–2000	Pegasus	4–1	Victorians
2000–01	Pegasus	5–0	Portadown
2001–02	Pegasus	4–0	Ballymoney
2002–03	Pegasus	3–0	Randalstown
2004–05	Pegasus		Ballymoney
2005–06	Pegasus	2–0	Ballymoney
2007–08	Pegasus	3–0	Ballymoney
2008–09	Pegasus	2–0	Ulster Elks
2011–12	Pegasus	1–0	Armagh
2012–13	Ballymoney	1–0	Pegasus
2013–14	Ards	3–1	Pegasus
2014–15	Ards	3–3 (Note: Ards won 2–1 in penalty shootout.)	Pegasus

=== Irish Senior Cup ===
Pegasus won the Irish Senior Cup for the first time in 1973–74. The club completed a treble, also winning the Ulster Shield and the Senior League.

Season	Winners	Score	Runners up
1968	Muckross	4–2 (Note: After extra time)	Pegasus
1969	Muckross	3–2	Pegasus
1974	Pegasus	2–0	Hermes
1975	Pembroke Wanderers	1–0	Pegasus
1976	Muckross	2–0 (Note: Muckross won after replay, first game finished 1–1)	Pegasus
1978	Pegasus	3–0	Cork C of I
1981	Pegasus	2–1 (Note: After extra time)	Genesis
1984	Pegasus	3–1	Catholic Institute
1985	Portadown	1–0	Pegasus
1987	Pegasus		Portadown
1989	Pegasus	2–0 (Note: Pegasus won after replay, first game finished 0–0)	Muckross
1992	Pegasus	1–0	Portadown
1994	Muckross	1–0	Pegasus
1995	Pegasus	2–0	Muckross
1996	Pegasus	2–1 (Note: After extra time)	Muckross
1998	Pegasus	5–0	Old Alexandra
1999	Hermes	3–2	Pegasus
2001	Ballymoney	1–1 (Note: Ballymoney won 3–2 on penalties)	Pegasus
2004	Pegasus	2–1	Hermes
2007	Pegasus	1–0	Pembroke Wanderers
2008	Pegasus	2–1	Ballymoney
2009	UCD	4–1	Pegasus
2010–11	Pegasus	3–1	Hermes
2017–18	UCD	4–0	Pegasus

=== All-Ireland Club Championship ===
Pegasus won the inaugural All-Ireland Club Championship in 1990–91. Between 1999 and 2003 Pegasus won the championship five times in a row.

Season	Winners	Score	Runners up
1991	Pegasus	n/a	
1998	Pegasus		
1999	Pegasus		
2000	Pegasus		
2001	Pegasus		
2002	Pegasus		
2003	Pegasus		
2005	Pegasus		
2006	Hermes		Pegasus
2007	Pegasus	3–1	Hermes

=== Women's Irish Hockey League ===
After winning their first title in 2010–11, Pegasus added a second in 2014–15. Ayeisha McFerran was a member of their 2014–15 title winning team.

Season	Winners	Score	Runners up
2010–11	Pegasus	4–1	Hermes
2014–15	Pegasus	1–1 (Note: Pegasus won 4–2 after a penalty shoot-out)	Loreto
2015–16	Hermes	n/a	Pegasus

Notes

=== Pegasus in Europe ===
Tournament	Place
1989–90 European Club Championships A Division	5th
1991–92 European Club Championships A Division	8th
1992–93 European Cup Winners Cup B Division	1st
1996–97 European Cup Winners Cup A Division	4th
1998–99 European Club Championships B Division	1st
1999–2000 European Club Championships A Division	8th
2000–01 European Club Championships B Division	4th
2001–02 European Club Championships B Division	2nd
2012 EuroHockey Club Champions Trophy	1st
2016 EuroHockey Club Champions Cup	8th
2020 Euro Hockey League	Qualified

=== Irish Junior Cup ===
Season	Winners	Score	Runners up
1962	Pembroke Wanderers III	2–0	Pegasus I
1969	Pegasus II	2–0	Maids of the Mountain II
1973	Pegasus II	1–0	Muckross II
1974	Pegasus II	1–0	Railway Union II
1993	Pegasus II		
1995	Pegasus II		Enniscorthy
1996	Pegasus II	2–0	Enniscorthy
1997	Pegasus II	2–1	Kilkenny
1998	Pegasus II		Old Alexandra II
2000	Pegasus II	8–1	Kilkenny
2002	Hermes II	2–0	Pegasus II
2003	Pegasus II	3–0	Three Rock Rovers II
2004	Pegasus II		Hermes II

== Notable players ==
Ireland internationals

In 1966–67 Sandra Wylie became the first Pegasus player to represent the Ireland women's national field hockey team. When Ireland won the silver medal at the 2018 Women's Hockey World Cup, the squad included two current or former Pegasus players, Ayeisha McFerran and Shirley McCay.

- Arlene Boyles
- Hilary Brady
- Noelle Brannigan
- Jenny Givan
- Maggie Gleghorne
- Karen Humphreys
- Claire Samways
- Eilish Macken
- Violet McBride
- Shirley McCay
- Ayeisha McFerran
- Claire McMahon
- Jill Orbinson
- Maggie Sloan
- Glynis Taylor
- Sandra Wylie Millar

Great Britain internationals

- Jenny Givan
- Maggie Gleghorne
- Violet McBride

== Coaches ==
- Billy McConnell; 2007–2010

== Honours ==
- EuroHockey Club Champions Trophy
  - Winners: 2012: 1
- European Cup Winners Cup B Division
  - Winners: 1992–93: 1
- European Club Championships B Division
  - Winners: 1998–99: 1
  - Runners Up: 2001–02: 1
- Irish Senior Cup
  - Winners: 1974, 1978, 1981, 1984, 1987, 1989, 1992, 1995, 1996, 1998, 2004, 2007, 2008, 2010–11 : 14
  - Runners Up: 1968, 1969, 1975, 1976, 1985, 1994, 1999, 2001, 2009, 2017–18: 10
- Ulster Shield
  - Winners: 1966–67, 1967–68, 1968–69, 1972–73, 1973–74, 1974–75, 1975–76, 1977–78, 1978–79, 1980–81, 1981–82, 1983–84, 1986–87, 1987–88, 1988–89, 1995–96, 1996–97, 1997–98, 1998–99, 1999–2000, 2000–01, 2001–02, 2002–03, 2004–05, 2005–06, 2007–08, 2008–09, 2011–12, 2018–19, 2022-23 : 30
  - Runners Up: 1971–72, 1976–77, 1984–85, 1993–94, 2012–13, 2013–14, 2014–15 : 7
- Women's Irish Hockey League
  - Winners: 2010–11, 2014–15, 2018–19: 3
  - Runners Up: 2015–16: 1
- All-Ireland Club Championship
  - Winners: 1991, 1998, 1999, 2000, 2001, 2002, 2003, 2005, 2007: 8 ?
  - Runners Up: 2006: 1
- EY Champions Trophy
  - Winners: 2018–19
  - Runners Up: 2016
- Irish Junior Cup
  - Winners: 1969, 1973, 1974, 1993, 1995, 1996, 1997, 1998, 2000, 2003, 2004: 11
  - Runners Up: 1962, 2002: 2
