= Women's Irish Hockey League =

- First season: 2008–09
- Administrator: Hockey Ireland
- No. of teams: 10 (Division 1); 10 (Division 2)
- Country: Republic of Ireland; Northern Ireland
- Most recent champion: Pegasus
- Most titles: UCD (3 titles); Railway Union (3 titles)
- Level on pyramid: 1 and 2
- Relegation to: Senior provincial leagues
- Domestic cup: Irish Senior Cup
- International cup: Women's Euro Hockey League
- Website: www.hockey.ie

The Women's Irish Hockey League is a field hockey league organised by Hockey Ireland that features women's teams from both the Republic of Ireland and Northern Ireland. The league was first played for during the 2008–09 season. It replaced the All-Ireland Club Championships as the top level women's field hockey competition in Ireland. Since 2015–16 the league has been sponsored by Ernst & Young and, as a result, it is also known as the EY Hockey League. The league has previously been sponsored by the ESB Group and Electric Ireland.

== History ==
=== Inaugural title ===
The league was first played for during the 2008–09 season. Loreto, with a team that included Nikki Symmons, Lizzie Colvin, Hannah Matthews and Alison Meeke, won the inaugural title. In the league final they defeated a Hermes team that included Nicola Evans, Anna O'Flanagan, Gillian Pinder and Chloe Watkins. Loreto won 2–1 in a penalty shoot-out, becoming the first team in the world to win a title with the new one-on-one format.

=== Railway Union dominance ===
During the first five seasons Railway Union emerged as the strongest team, winning three titles in fours seasons. In 2009–10, with a team that included Cecelia and Isobel Joyce, Emer Lucey, Nicola Evans and Kate McKenna, Railway Union won their first title. They won further titles in 2011–12 and 2012–13. Pegasus have initially emerged as the strongest team from Northern Ireland. After winning their first title in 2010–11, they added a second in 2014–15. Ayeisha McFerran was a member of their 2014–15 title winning team. UCD won their first title in 2013–14 with a squad that included Katie Mullan, Gillian Pinder, Deirdre Duke, Nicola Evans, Anna O'Flanagan and Emily Beatty.

=== New format ===
Between 2008–09 and 2014–15 the league used pool stages and play-offs to determine the league champion. Teams were divides into two pools with the winners and runners-up in each pool then qualifying for the semi-finals. The league title was then decided by a final. Teams continued to play in their respective provincial leagues and qualified for the next season's national league via their position in the provincial league. However, for the 2015–16 season the league was reorganised. The pool stages were abandoned and replaced with a full league programme consisting of 18 rounds of home and away matches. In addition the play-offs were effectively replaced by a new competition, the EY Champions Trophy. Furthermore, the clubs no longer entered their senior teams in provincial leagues.

With a team that included Anna O'Flanagan, Chloe Watkins and Nicola Evans, Hermes won the 2015–16 title. They also won the inaugural EY Champions Trophy. The 2016–17 season saw UCD claim the league title in dramatic fashion as Elena Tice scored two penalty corners to inflict a first league defeat on Hermes-Monkstown. The result saw UCD overtake Hermes-Monkstown on the final day of the campaign. The result also saw UCD win their second trophy in six days, adding to the Irish Senior Cup. UCD subsequently completed a treble when they also won the EY Champions Trophy after defeating Hermes-Monkstown in a penalty shoot-out. The 2017–18 season saw UCD retain the league title. Having already won the Irish Senior Cup, UCD also completed a double.

=== Division 2 ===
The 2018–19 season saw the introduction of a Division 2. The new division revived the original format of the league. It uses pool stages and play-offs to determine the Division 2 champion and which teams get promoted to Division 1. Division 2 teams will continue to play in their respective provincial leagues.

== 2019–20 teams ==
=== Division 1 ===
| Team | Home town/suburb | Home pitch |
|---|---|---|
| Belfast Harlequins | Belfast | Deramore Park |
| Catholic Institute | Limerick | Rosbrien |
| Cork Harlequins | Douglas, Cork | Harlequin Park |
| Loreto | Rathfarnham | Loreto High School Beaufort |
| Muckross | Donnybrook, Dublin | Muckross Park College |
| Old Alex | Milltown, Dublin | Alexandra College |
| Pegasus | Belfast | Queens |
| Pembroke Wanderers | Sandymount | Serpentine Avenue |
| Railway Union | Sandymount | Park Avenue |
| UCD | Dún Laoghaire–Rathdown | UCD Sports Centre |

=== Division 2 ===
Pool A

| Team | Home town/suburb | Home pitch |
|---|---|---|
| Corinthian | Rathfarnham | St Columba's College, Dublin |
| Cork Church of Ireland | Cork | |
| Dublin University | Trinity College Dublin | Santry Avenue |
| Lurgan | Lurgan | Lurgan Junior High School |
| NUIG | NUI Galway | Dangan Sports Centre |

Pool B

| Team | Home town/suburb | Home pitch |
|---|---|---|
| Ards | Newtownards | Londonderry Park |
| Greenfields | Galway | Dangan Sports Centre |
| Monkstown | Dún Laoghaire–Rathdown | Rathdown School |
| Queen's University | Queen's University Belfast | The Dub |
| UCC | University College Cork | The Mardyke |

== Winners ==
| Season | Winners | Score | Runners up |
|---|---|---|---|
| 2008–09 | Loreto | (Note: Loreto won 2–1 after penalty shoot-out) | Hermes |
| 2009–10 | Railway Union | 4–0 | Cork Harlequins |
| 2010–11 | Pegasus | 4–1 | Hermes |
| 2011–12 | Railway Union | | Loreto |
| 2012–13 | Railway Union | (Note: Railway Union won after a penalty shoot-out) | Loreto |
| 2013–14 | UCD | | Railway Union |
| 2014–15 | Pegasus | 1–1 (Note: Pegasus won 4–2 after a penalty shoot-out) | Loreto |
| 2015–16 | Hermes | n/a | Pegasus |
| 2016–17 | UCD | n/a | Hermes-Monkstown |
| 2017–18 | UCD | n/a | Cork Harlequins |
| 2018–19 | Pegasus | n/a | Loreto |
| 2019–20 | null and void (season abandoned due to coronavirus pandemic) | | |
| 2020–21 | not played due to coronavirus pandemic | | |
| 2021–22 | Pembroke Wanderers | n/a | Catholic Institute |
| 2022–23 | UCD | n/a | |
| 2023–24 | Loreto | n/a | |

Notes

== EY Champions Trophy ==
In addition to introducing a new format, the 2015–16 season also saw the introduction of the EY Champions Trophy. The top three placed teams from the league and/or the winners of the Irish Senior Cup all qualify for the end of season competition. The winners of the EY Champions Trophy qualify to represent Ireland in the EuroHockey Club Champions Cup.

| Year | Winners | Score | Runners up |
|---|---|---|---|
| 2016 | Hermes | 3–1 | Pegasus |
| 2017 | UCD | 1–1 (Note: UCD won 3–0 after penalty shoot-out) | Hermes-Monkstown |
| 2018 | Loreto | 2–1 | Cork Harlequins |
| 2018-19 | Pegasus | 1–1 (Note: Pegasus won 4–2 after penalty shoot-out) | Loreto |
| 2021-22 | Pembroke Wanderers | 4–1 | Catholic Institute |
| 2022-23 | Loreto | 1–0 | UCD |
| 2022-23 | Railway Union | 1–0 | Loreto |

Notes
