= 2017 Women's Four Nations Cup =

Tournament details
- Host country: Germany
- City: Berlin
- Teams: 4

Final positions
- Champions: Germany (3rd title)
- Runner-up: Ireland
- Third place: China

Tournament statistics
- Matches played: 6
- Goals scored: 23 (3.83 per match)
- Top scorer(s): (Germany) Nike Lorenz (Germany) Marie Mävers (Ireland) Kathryn Mullan (2 goals)

The 2018 Women's Four Nations Cup was the seventh Hockey Four Nations Cup, an international women's field hockey tournament, consisting of a series of test matches. It was held in Germany, from June 15 to 18, 2017, and featured four of the top nations in women's field hockey.

== Competition format ==
The tournament featured the national teams of China, Ireland, South Korea, and the hosts, Germany, competing in a round-robin format, with each team playing each other once. Three points were awarded for a win, one for a draw, and none for a loss.

Country	June 2017 FIH Ranking	Best World Cup finish	Best Olympic Games finish
China	8	Third Place (2002)	Runners-Up (2008)
Germany	7	Champions (1976, 1981)	Champions (2004)
Ireland	15	Eleventh Place (1994)	Never Qualified
South Korea	9	Third Place (1990)	Runners-Up (1988, 1996)

== Results ==
Pos	Team	Pld	W	D	L	GF	GA	GD	Pts	Result
1	Germany (H)	3	2	0	1	7	4	+3	6	Tournament Champion
2	Ireland	3	2	0	1	6	7	−1	6	
3	China	3	1	1	1	6	6	0	4	
4	South Korea	3	0	1	2	4	6	−2	1	

Source: FIH
Rules for classification: 1) Points; 2) Goal difference; 3) Goals scored; 4) Games won; 5) Head-to-head.
(H) Hosts

=== Matches ===
15 June 2017
17:00

China	1–1	South Korea
Zhao 32'	Report	Cheon Eun-bi 53'

Umpires:
Alison Keogh (IRE)
Michelle Meister (GER)

15 June 2017
19:00

Germany	1–2	Ireland
Teschke 45'	Report	O'Flanagan 40'; Mullan 57'

Umpires:
Celine Martin-Schmets (BEL)
Kim Sung-youn (KOR)

16 June 2017
17:00

China	5–2	Ireland
Liang 10'; Zhong 38'; Peng 44'; Sun 55'; Zhang X. 59'	Report	Watkins 35'; Upton 42'

Umpires:
Michelle Meister (GER)
Kim Sung-yeon (KOR)

16 June 2017
19:00

Germany	3–2	South Korea
Lorenz 10'; Mävers 33'; Nobis 58'	Report	Kim Jong-eun 36'; Cho Yun-kyoung 53'

Umpires:
Rhiannon Murrie (AUS)
Celine Martin-Schmets (BEL)

18 June 2017
12:00

Ireland	2–1	South Korea
McCay 35'; Mullan 43'	Report	Cheon Seul-ki 37'

Umpires:
Michelle Meister (GER)
Celine Martin-Schmets (BEL)

18 June 2017
14:00

Germany	3–0	China
Mävers 25'; Lorenz 42'; Hauke 53'	Report

Umpires:
Alison Keogh (IRE)
Rhiannon Murrie (AUS)

== Statistics ==
=== Goalscorers ===
2 Goals

- (Germany) Nike Lorenz
- (Germany) Marie Mävers
- (Ireland) Kathryn Mullan

1 Goal

- (China) Liang Meiyu
- (China) Zhong Mengling
- (China) Sun Xiao
- (China) Zhang Xiaoxue
- (China) Peng Yang
- (China) Zhao Yudiao
- (Germany) Camille Nobis
- (Germany) Franzisca Hauke
- (Germany) Jana Teschke
- (Ireland) Shirley McCay
- (Ireland) Anna O'Flanagan
- (Ireland) Roisin Upton
- (Ireland) Chloe Watkins
- (South Korea) Cheon Eun-bi
- (South Korea) Kim Jong-eun
- (South Korea) Cheon Seul-ki
- (South Korea) Cho Yun-kyoung
