= Women's Irish Senior Cup (field hockey) =

The logo of the Irish Hockey Association.

The Women's Irish Senior Cup is the premier knockout trophy played for by the top women's field hockey clubs in Ireland. The competition is held under the auspices of the Irish Hockey Association, a body that was formed with the merger of the men's and women's Unions in 2000. The Irish Ladies Hockey Union was the first women's hockey organisation in the world.

== Historical format ==
From its start in 1903, the tournament was played through regional tournaments. The winners of the regional tournaments in Leinster, Munster and Ulster would proceed through to an open draw. Occasionally representatives from the South East Branch and the Connacht Branch also took part. In 1990, it was decided to change the format to an open draw with the top four sides from each of the provinces competing.

== Current format ==
In 1995 the decision was made to open the competition to all Senior Clubs in Ireland with seeding for the elite clubs introduced in 2000, exempting them from playing in the first two rounds, and going a long way to avoid mismatches.

The Final is played in Dublin and is normally broadcast by the Irish national television broadcaster RTÉ.

== Finals ==
(Records are incomplete)

=== 1900s ===
Year	Winner			Runner-up	Notes
1903	Merton	4	0	Holywood	
1904	Merton				
1905	Killiney	4	2	Holywood	
1906	Alexandra	4	3	Cork Ladies	
1907	Alexandra				
1908	Excelsior				
1909	Killiney				

=== 1910s ===
Year	Winner			Runner-up	Notes
1910	Cork Ladies				
1911	Cork Ladies				
1912	Killiney	6	3	Knock	
1913	Killiney	w	o	Knock	
1914	Knock				
1915	Killiney	4	2	Knock	
1916	Not Played				
1917	Not Played				
1918	Not Played				
1919	Not Played				

=== 1920s ===
Year	Winner			Runner-up	Notes
1920	Maids of the Mountain	3	2	Knock	
1921	Knock	7	0	Waterford	
1922	Alexandra	5	0	Waterford	
1923	Maids of the Mountain				
1924	Alexandra			Knock	Replay - Game 1: 2-2 after extra time
1925	Knock	2	1	Alexandra	
1926	Queen's University	2	1	Maids of the Mountain	after extra time
1927	Queen's University	2	0	Cork Ladies	
1928	Knock	9	1	Maids of the Mountain	
1929	Queen's University	6	4	Maids of the Mountain	after extra time

=== 1930s ===
Year	Winner			Runner-up	Notes
1930	Maids of the Mountain				
1931	Pembroke Wanderers				
1932	Ards	4	2	Cork Ladies	
1933	Cork Ladies			Dublin University	
1934	Cork Ladies			Alexandra	
1935	Maids	5	1	Instonians	
1936	Muckross	4	2	Ards	
1937	Pembroke Wanderers	3	0	Ards	Replay - Game 1: 1-1
1938	Muckross	1	0	Cork Ladies	
1939	Muckross	4	1	Ards	

=== 1940s ===
Year	Winner			Runner-up	Notes
1940	Loreto				
1941	Not Played				
1942	Not Played				
1943	Not Played				
1944	Not Played				
1945	Not Played				
1946	Loreto	3	2	Victorians	
1947	Pembroke Wanderers				
1948	Pembroke Wanderers	2	1	Knock	
1949	Pembroke Wanderers	4	0	Owls	

=== 1950s ===
Year	Winner			Runner-up	Notes
1950	Pembroke Wanderers	4	1	Ashton	
1951	UCD	2	1	Victorians	after extra time
1952	Pembroke Wanderers				
1953	Loreto	2	1	Ashton	
1954	Muckross	7	1	St Dominic's Past Pupils	
1955	Instonians	3	1	Loreto	
1956	Loreto	4	1	University College Cork	
1957	St Dominic's Past Pupils	2	1	Loreto	
1958	Loreto	8	0	Old Ursulines	
1959	Muckross	4	1	Ards	

=== 1960s ===
Year	Winner			Runner-up	Notes
1960	Loreto	3	0	Instonians	
1961	Muckross	3	2	Old Ursulines	
1962	Victorians	6	0	Old Ursulines	
1963	Muckross	2	0	Victorians	
1964	Ards	3	0	Old Ursulines	
1965	Pembroke Wanderers	5	3	Instonians	
1966	Muckross			Old Ursulines	
1967	Pembroke Wanderers	1	0	Old Ursulines	
1968	Muckross	4	2	Pegasus	after extra time
1969	Muckross	3	2	Pegasus	

=== 1970s ===
Year	Winner			Runner-up	Notes
1970	Pembroke Wanderers	2	1	Old Ursulines	
1971	Muckross	1	0	Ulster College of Physical Education	
1972	Portadown	3	1	Muckross	
1973	Pembroke Wanderers				
1974	Pegasus	2	0	Hermes	
1975	Pembroke Wanderers	1	0	Pegasus	
1976	Muckross	2	0	Pegasus	Replay - Game 1: 1-1
1977	Portadown	2	1	Loreto	
1978	Pegasus	3	0	Cork Church of Ireland	
1979	Muckross			Catholic Institute	

=== 1980s ===
Year	Winner			Runner-up	Notes
1980	Portadown	1	0	Belvedere	
1981	Pegasus	2	1	Genesis	after extra time
1982	Muckross			Ashton	Replay - Game 1: 0-0
1983	Portadown	3	2	Muckross	after extra time in replay - Game 1: 1-1
1984	Pegasus	3	1	Catholic Institute	
1985	Portadown	1	0	Pegasus	
1986	Portadown	1	0	Old Alexandra	Replay - Game 1: 1-1
1987	Pegasus			Portadown	
1988	Old Alexandra			Pembroke Wanderers	
1989	Pegasus	2	0	Muckross	Replay - Game 1: 0-0

=== 1990s ===
Year	Winner			Runner-up	Notes
1990	Portadown			Muckross	
1991	Old Alexandra			Muckross	
1992	Pegasus	1	0	Portadown	
1993	Portadown	2	0	Loreto	
1994	Muckross	1	0	Pegasus	
1995	Pegasus	2	0	Muckross	
1996	Pegasus	2	1	Muckross	after extra time
1997	Hermes	2	1	Muckross	
1998	Pegasus	5	0	Old Alexandra	
1999	Hermes	3	2	Pegasus	

=== 2000s ===
Year	Winner			Runner-up	Notes
2000	Cork Harlequins	2	1	Hermes	
2001	Ballymoney	1	1	Pegasus	Ballymoney won 3-2 on penalties
2002	Loreto	2	2	Hermes	Loreto won 3-1 on penalties
2003	Loreto	3	2	Cork Harlequins	after extra time
2004	Pegasus	2	1	Hermes	
2005	Hermes	2	2	Ballymoney	Hermes won 4-3 on penalties
2006	Hermes	1	0	Old Alexandra	
2007	Pegasus	1	0	Pembroke Wanderers	
2008	Pegasus	2	1	Ballymoney	
2009	UCD	4	1	Pegasus	

=== 2010s ===
Year	Winner			Runner-up	Notes
2009-10	Loreto	2	2	Railway Union	Loreto won 4-2 on penalties
2010-11	Pegasus	3	1	Hermes	
2011-12	UCD	3	2	Loreto	
2012-13	Railway Union	3	2	UCD	
2013-14	UCD	2	0	Pembroke Wanderers	
2014-15	Ulster Elks	1	0	Hermes	
2015-16	Ulster Elks	1	1	Ards	After extra time; Elks won on penalty strokes
2016-17	UCD	1	0	Cork Harlequins	
2017-18	UCD	4	0	Pegasus	
2018-19	Cork Harlequins	2	2	Loreto	Harlequins won 2-1 in shoot-out

Notes:

- ^{a} Alexandra College/Old College would later be named Old Alexandra

=== 2020s ===
Year	Winner			Runner-up	Notes
2019-20	UCD	3	1	Pegasus	
2020-21	not played				
2021-22	Catholic Institute	1	0	Pembroke	
2022-23	Monkstown	3	1	Catholic Institute	
2023-24	Railway Union	1	0	Catholic Institute	
2024-25	Railway Union	2	1	Loreto	
2025-26	Railway Union			Monkstown	
