= 2010 EuroHockey Club Champions Cup =

Tournament details
- Dates: 2 April–23 May 2010
- Teams: 12
- Venue: 2 (in 2 host cities)

Final positions
- Champions: (Netherlands) Den Bosch (11th title)
- Runner-up: (Germany) Hamburg
- Third place: (Netherlands) Amsterdam

Tournament statistics
- Matches played: 22
- Goals scored: 96 (4.36 per match)
- Top scorer: (Netherlands) Fieke Holman (AMS) (8 goals)

The 2010 EuroHockey Club Champions Cup was the 37th edition of the premier women's European club championship. The tournament was held in two stages, spanning from 2 April to 23 May 2010. The first stage was held in Berlin, Germany, and the second in Amsterdam, Netherlands.

Den Bosch won the tournament for the eleventh time, defeating Hamburg 3–0 in the final. Amsterdam finished in third place after defeating Atasport 2–1 in the third-place playoff.

== Teams ==
The following twelve teams participated in the tournament:

- (Azerbaijan) Atasport
- (England) Bowdon Hightown
- (England) Olton & West Warwickshire
- (Germany) Berliner (host club)
- (Germany) Hamburg
- (Netherlands) Amsterdam (host club)
- (Netherlands) Den Bosch
- (Ukraine) Sumchanka
- (Russia) Volga
- (Scotland) Grove Menzieshill
- (Spain) Club de Campo
- (Spain) Club de Polo

== Format ==
The twelve teams were divided into pools of three. In each pool, teams competed in a single round-robin format. At the conclusion of the pool stage, the top two teams of each pool qualified for the Quarter-finals, while the bottom teams moved on to classification matches. The losing Quarter-finalists were eliminated, whole the winners moved on the Semi-finals and subsequent medal matches.

== Results ==
=== Preliminary round ===
==== Pool A ====
Pos	Team	Pld	W	D	L	GF	GA	GD	Pts	Qualification
1	(Netherlands) Amsterdam	2	2	0	0	20	0	+20	10	Advanced to Quarter-finals
2	(England) Olton & West Warwickshire	2	1	0	1	1	12	−11	6	Advanced to Quarter-finals
3	(Russia) Volga	2	0	0	2	0	9	−9	2	

Source: Deutscher Hockey-Bund

2 April 2010
17:00

Olton & West Warwickshire (England)	1–0	(Russia) Volga
Marston-Smith 66'	Report

Berliner HC, Berlin
Umpires:
Michelle Meister (GER)
Victoria del Olmo (ESP)

3 April 2010
14:30

Volga (Russia)	0–8	(Netherlands) Amsterdam
	Report	Jonker 5', 66'; Hoog 11', 52', 67'; Walsh 18'; Holman 37'; Groen 39'

Berliner HC, Berlin
Umpires:
Keely Dunn (CAN)
Michelle Meister (GER)

4 April 2010
14:30

Amsterdam (Netherlands)	12–0	(England) Olton & West Warwickshire
Groen 4', 55'; Holman 5', 22', 45'; Mattheussens 43'; Jonker 48'; Hoog 50', 57'; Van Male 52', 65'; Van Drunen 67'	Report

Berliner HC, Berlin
Umpires:
Dino Willox (WAL)
Christiane Hippler (GER)

==== Pool B ====
Pos	Team	Pld	W	D	L	GF	GA	GD	Pts	Qualification
1	(Germany) Hamburg	2	2	0	0	4	2	+2	10	Advanced to Quarter-finals
2	(Spain) Club de Polo	2	1	0	1	5	5	0	6	Advanced to Quarter-finals
3	(Scotland) Grove Menzieshill	2	0	0	2	2	4	−2	2	

Source: Deutscher Hockey-Bund

2 April 2010
13:00

Club de Polo (Spain)	3–2	(Scotland) Grove Menzieshill
Schneider 20'; Dabanch 38', 52'	Report	Baxter 6'; Bell 26'

Berliner HC, Berlin
Umpires:
Valentina Tomasi (ITA)
Hannah Sanders (ENG)

3 April 2010
10:30

Grove Menzieshill (Scotland)	0–1	(Germany) Hamburg
	Report	Hahn 3'

Berliner HC, Berlin
Umpires:
Vafa Mirzoyeva (AZE)
Victoria del Olmo (ESP)

4 April 2010
10:30

Hamburg (Germany)	3–2	(Spain) Club de Polo
Oldhafer 9'; Mävers 34', 46'	Report	49'; Dabanch 53'

Berliner HC, Berlin
Umpires:
Stella Bartlema (NED)
Janice Tasho (ENG)

==== Pool C ====
Pos	Team	Pld	W	D	L	GF	GA	GD	Pts	Qualification
1	(Spain) Club de Campo	2	2	0	0	5	1	+4	10	Advanced to Quarter-finals
2	(Germany) Berliner	2	1	0	1	6	3	+3	6	Advanced to Quarter-finals
3	(Ukraine) Sumchanka	2	0	0	2	0	7	−7	2	

Source: Deutscher Hockey-Bund

2 April 2010
17:00

Berliner (Germany)	5–0	(Ukraine) Sumchanka
Hapke 4', 58'; Billmann 25'; Stern 43'; Brockmann 46'	Report

Berliner HC, Berlin
Umpires:
Stella Bartlema (NED)
Vafa Mirzoyeva (AZE)

3 April 2010
16:30

Sumchanka (Ukraine)	0–2	(Spain) Club de Campo
	Report	A. Gil 30', 37'

Berliner HC, Berlin
Umpires:
Janice Tasho (ENG)
Jean Duncan (SCO)

4 April 2010
16:30

Club de Campo (Spain)	3–1	(Germany) Berliner
Malda 15', 44'; A. Gil 27'	Report	Otte 67'

Berliner HC, Berlin
Umpires:
Keely Dunn (CAN)
Hannah Sanders (ENG)

==== Pool D ====
Pos	Team	Pld	W	D	L	GF	GA	GD	Pts	Qualification
1	(Netherlands) Den Bosch	2	2	0	0	9	0	+9	10	Advanced to Quarter-finals
2	(Azerbaijan) Atasport	2	1	0	1	2	5	−3	6	Advanced to Quarter-finals
3	(England) Bowdon Hightown	2	0	0	2	1	7	−6	2	

Source: Deutscher Hockey-Bund

2 April 2010
15:00

Atasport (Azerbaijan)	0–4	(Netherlands) Den Bosch
	Report	Paumen 7', 23', 55'; Vorstenbosch 11'

Berliner HC, Berlin
Umpires:
Dino Willox (WAL)
Tatyana Kaltypan (UKR)

3 April 2010
12:30

Bowdon Hightown (England)	1–2	(Azerbaijan) Atasport
Walton 62'	Report	Pirsaatova 43'; Khudiyeva 65'

Berliner HC, Berlin
Umpires:
Tatyana Kaltypan (UKR)
Christiane Hippler (GER)

4 April 2010
12:30

Den Bosch (Netherlands)	5–0	(England) Bowdon Hightown
Paumen 18', 18'; E. Mol 41'; Hulsen 43'; Kremers 63'	Report

Berliner HC, Berlin
Umpires:
Jean Duncan (SCO)
Valentina Tomasi (ITA)

=== Classification round ===
==== Ninth to twelfth place classification ====
5 April 2010
10:00

Volga (Russia)	1–0	(Scotland) Grove Menzieshill
Shentsova 9'	Report

Berliner HC, Berlin
Umpires:
Tatyana Kaltypan (UKR)
Vafa Mirzoyeva (AZE)

5 April 2010
10:30

Sumchanka (Ukraine)	0–2	(England) Bowdon Hightown
	Report	McNaught 53'; Cullen 69'

Berliner HC, Berlin
Umpires:
Valentina Tomasi (ITA)
Christiane Hippler (GER)

==== First to eighth place classification ====
Quarter-finals
5 April 2010
(Germany) Hamburg	5
(England) Olton & West Warwickshire	1
5 April 2010
(Spain) Club de Campo	1
(Azerbaijan) Atasport	2
5 April 2010
(Netherlands) Amsterdam	9
(Spain) Club de Polo	0
5 April 2010
(Netherlands) Den Bosch	6
(Germany) Berliner	0

Semi-finals
21 May 2010
(Germany) Hamburg	2
(Azerbaijan) Atasport	1
21 May 2010
(Netherlands) Amsterdam	0
(Netherlands) Den Bosch	2

Final
22 May 2010
(Germany) Hamburg	0
(Netherlands) Den Bosch	3
Third place
23 May 2010
(Azerbaijan) Atasport	1
(Netherlands) Amsterdam	4

===== Quarter-finals =====
5 April 2010
12:30

Hamburg (Germany)	5–1	(England) Olton & West Warwickshire
Müller-Wieland 15'; Oldhafer 23'; Hoffmann 29'; Hahn 37'; Dudurov 66'	Report	Marston-Smith 8'

Berliner HC, Berlin
Umpires:
Stella Bartlema (NED)
Victoria del Olmo (ESP)

5 April 2010
13:00

Den Bosch (Netherlands)	6–0	(Germany) Berliner
Paumen 4'; E. Mol 11'; Goderie 28'; Schopman 32', 70'; Van de Hout 53'	Report

Berliner HC, Berlin
Umpires:
Hannah Sanders (ENG)
Dino Willox (WAL)

5 April 2010
15:00

Amsterdam (Netherlands)	9–0	(Spain) Club de Polo
Holman 5', 5'; Hoog 18'; Jonker 32'; Van Male 37', 41'; Plijter 57'; Collot d'Escury 67'; Groen 70'	Report

Berliner HC, Berlin
Umpires:
Jean Duncan (SCO)
Michelle Meister (GER)

5 April 2010
15:30

Club de Campo (Spain)	1–2	(Azerbaijan) Atasport
Rebecchi 8'	Report	Muzaffarova 35'; K. Aliyeva 62'

Berliner HC, Berlin
Umpires:
Keely Dunn (CAN)
Janice Tasho (ENG)

===== Semi-finals =====
21 May 2010
16:30

Hamburg (Germany)	2–1	(Azerbaijan) Atasport
Hoffmann 27'; Hahn 43'	Report	K. Aliyeva 8'

Wagener Stadium, Amsterdam
Umpires:
Victoria del Olmo (ESP)
Jean Duncan (SCO)

21 May 2010
19:00

Amsterdam (Netherlands)	1–2	(Netherlands) Den Bosch
Jonker 6'	Report	Paumen 4'; Kremers 42'

Wagener Stadium, Amsterdam
Umpires:
Frances Block (ENG)
Carol Metchette (IRE)

===== Third and fourth place =====
22 May 2010
17:00

Atasport (Azerbaijan)	1–4	(Netherlands) Amsterdam
K. Aliyeva 23'	Report	Holman 10', 62'; Jonker 48'; 67'

Wagener Stadium, Amsterdam
Umpires:
Frances Block (ENG)
Jean Duncan (SCO)

===== Final =====
23 May 2010
10:30

Hamburg (Germany)	0–3	(Netherlands) Den Bosch
	Report	Goderie 8', 40'; Welten 51'

Wagener Stadium, Amsterdam
Umpires:
Carol Metchette (IRE)
Victoria del Olmo (ESP)

== Statistics ==
=== Final standings ===
Pos	Grp	Team	Pld	W	D	L	GF	GA	GD	Pts	Final result
1	D	(Netherlands) Den Bosch	5	5	0	0	20	1	+19	25	Gold medal
2	B	(Germany) Hamburg	5	4	0	1	11	7	+4	21	Silver medal
3	A	(Netherlands) Amsterdam	5	4	0	1	34	3	+31	21	Bronze medal
4	D	(Azerbaijan) Atasport	5	2	0	3	6	12	−6	13	Fourth place
5	C	(Spain) Club de Campo	3	2	0	1	6	3	+3	11	Eliminated in quarterfinals
6	C	(Germany) Berliner	3	1	0	2	6	9	−3	7	Eliminated in quarterfinals
7	B	(Spain) Club de Polo	3	1	0	2	5	14	−9	7	Eliminated in quarterfinals
8	A	(England) Olton & West Warwickshire	3	1	0	2	2	17	−15	7	Eliminated in quarterfinals
9	D	(England) Bowdon Hightown	3	1	0	2	3	7	−4	7	Eliminated in group stage
10	A	(Russia) Volga	3	1	0	2	1	9	−8	7	Eliminated in group stage
11	B	(Scotland) Grove Menzieshill	3	0	0	3	2	5	−3	3	Eliminated in group stage
12	C	(Ukraine) Sumchanka	3	0	0	3	0	9	−9	3	Eliminated in group stage

Source: Deutscher Hockey-Bund

=== Goalscorers ===
There were 96 goals scored in 22 matches, for an average of 4.36 goals per match.

8 goals

- (Netherlands) Fieke Holman (AMS)

7 goals

- (Netherlands) Maartje Paumen (DBO)

6 goals

- (Netherlands) Kelly Jonker (AMS)
- (Netherlands) Ellen Hoog (AMS)

4 goals

- (Netherlands) Elsemiek Groen (AMS)
- (Netherlands) Kitty van Male (AMS)

3 goals

- (Azerbaijan) Khatira Aliyeva
- (Germany) Lisa Hahn (HAM)
- (Netherlands) Maartje Goderie (DBO)
- (Spain) Paula Dabanch (CDP)
- (Spain) Amparo Gil (CDC)

2 goals

- (England) Denise Marston-Smith (OWW)
- (Germany) Lisa Hapke (BER)
- (Germany) Eileen Hoffmann (HAM)
- (Germany) Marie Mävers (HAM)
- (Germany) Pia-Sophie Oldhafer (HAM)
- (Netherlands) Nienke Kremers (DBO)
- (Netherlands) Emilie Mol (DBO)
- (Netherlands) Janneke Schopman (DBO)
- (Spain) Bárbara Malda (CDC)

1 goal

- (Azerbaijan) Ji-Eun Khudiyeva
- (Azerbaijan) Emine Muzaffarova
- (Azerbaijan) Young-Soon Pirsaatova
- (England) Tina Cullen (BHT)
- (England) Lisa McNaught (BHT)
- (England) Sally Walton (BHT)
- (Germany) Britta Billmann (BER)
- (Germany) Anke Brockmann (BER)
- (Germany) Julia Dudurov (HAM)
- (Germany) Janne Müller-Wieland (HAM)
- (Germany) Katharina Otte (BER)
- (Germany) Franziska Stern (BER)
- (Netherlands) Kiki Collot d'Escury (AMS)
- (Netherlands) Lina van Drunen (AMS)
- (Netherlands) Fleur van de Hout (DBO)
- (Netherlands) Lieke Hulsen (DBO)
- (Netherlands) Marieke Mattheussens (AMS)
- (Netherlands) Jolanda Plijter (AMS)
- (Netherlands) Vera Vorstenbosch (DBO)
- (Netherlands) Rachel Walsh (AMS)
- (Netherlands) Lidewij Welten (DBO)
- (Russia) Olga Shentsova
- (Scotland) Louise Baxter
- (Scotland) Alison Bell
- (Spain) Carla Rebecchi (CDC)
- (Spain) Stefanie Schneider (CDP)

1 own goal

- (Azerbaijan) Atasport (against Amsterdam)
- (Germany) Hamburg (against Club de Polo)
