= 2011 EuroHockey Club Champions Cup =

European sporting tournament

Tournament details
- Dates: 22 April – 12 June
- Teams: 12
- Venue: 2 (in 2 host cities)

Final positions
- Champions: (Netherlands) Den Bosch (12th title)
- Runner-up: (England) Leicester
- Third place: (Netherlands) Laren

Tournament statistics
- Matches played: 22
- Goals scored: 96 (4.36 per match)

The 2011 EuroHockey Club Champions Cup was the 39th edition of the premier European competition for women's field hockey clubs. The pool stage and quarter finals of the tournament were held in 's-Hertogenbosch from 22 to 25 April, while the semi-finals and finals were held in The Hague from 10 to 12 June.

Den Bosch won the title for the twelfth time after defeating Leicester 4–1 in the final. The win entered Den Bosch into the record books as the joint most successful team in the competition, tied with Amsterdam.

== Results ==
=== Preliminary round ===
==== Pool A ====
Pos	Team	Pld	W	D	L	GF	GA	GD	Pts	Qualification	Netherlands	England	Belgium
1	(Netherlands) Den Bosch	2	2	0	0	11	1	+10	6	Quarter-finals	—	3–1	8–0
2	(England) Leicester	2	1	0	1	4	4	0	3	Quarter-finals		—	3–1
3	(Belgium) Royal Antwerp	2	0	0	2	1	11	−10	0				—

Source: Deutscher Hockey-Bund

22 April 2011
18:00

Den Bosch (Netherlands)	8–0	(Belgium) Royal Antwerp
	Report

HC Den Bosch, 's-Hertogenbosch

23 April 2011
17:00

Royal Antwerp (Belgium)	1–3	(England) Leicester
GOALS (1)	Report	Cullen 28'; Rogers 29'; Herbert 45'

HC Den Bosch, 's-Hertogenbosch

24 April 2011
17:00

Leicester (England)	1–3	(Netherlands) Den Bosch
	Report

HC Den Bosch, 's-Hertogenbosch

==== Pool B ====
Pos	Team	Pld	W	D	L	GF	GA	GD	Pts	Qualification	Germany	Spain	Belarus
1	(Germany) Berliner	2	2	0	0	11	0	+11	6	Quarter-finals	—	7–0	4–0
2	(Spain) Terrassa	2	1	0	1	3	9	−6	3	Quarter-finals		—	3–2
3	(Belarus) Grodno	2	0	0	2	2	7	−5	0				—

Source: Deutscher Hockey-Bund

22 April 2011
14:00

Berliner (Germany)	4–0	(Belarus) Grodno
Keller 11', 29'; Brockmann 53'; Hayn 65'	Report

HC Den Bosch, 's-Hertogenbosch

23 April 2011
13:00

Grodno (Belarus)	2–3	(Spain) Terrassa
	Report

HC Den Bosch, 's-Hertogenbosch

24 April 2011
13:00

Terrassa (Spain)	0–7	(Germany) Berliner
	Report	Wieske 7', 25'; Otte 41', 46'; Brockmann 48'; Hapke 66'; Keller 70'

HC Den Bosch, 's-Hertogenbosch

==== Pool C ====
Pos	Team	Pld	W	D	L	GF	GA	GD	Pts	Qualification	Spain	Germany	Russia
1	(Spain) Club de Campo	2	1	1	0	7	2	+5	4	Quarter-finals	—	2–2	5–0
2	(Germany) Hamburg	2	1	1	0	5	3	+2	4	Quarter-finals		—	3–1
3	(Russia) Volga	2	0	0	2	1	8	−7	0				—

Source: Deutscher Hockey-Bund

22 April 2011
12:00

Club de Campo (Spain)	5–0	(Russia) Volga
	Report

HC Den Bosch, 's-Hertogenbosch

23 April 2011
11:00

Volga (Russia)	1–3	(Germany) Hamburg
Ivanova 20'	Report	Teschke 38'; Hoffmann 49'; Hahn 52'

HC Den Bosch, 's-Hertogenbosch

24 April 2011
11:00

Hamburg (Germany)	2–2	(Spain) Club de Campo
Hoffmann 8'; Somin 13'	Report	Rebecchi 35'; Sánchez 43'

HC Den Bosch, 's-Hertogenbosch

==== Pool D ====
Pos	Team	Pld	W	D	L	GF	GA	GD	Pts	Qualification	Netherlands	England	Azerbaijan
1	(Netherlands) Laren	2	2	0	0	5	0	+5	6	Quarter-finals	—	3–0	2–0
2	(England) Slough	2	1	0	1	2	3	−1	3	Quarter-finals		—	2–0
3	(Azerbaijan) Atasport	2	0	0	2	0	4	−4	0				—

Source: Deutscher Hockey-Bund

22 April 2011
16:00

Slough (England)	2–0	(Azerbaijan) Atasport
Strong 4'; Scott 19'	Report

HC Den Bosch, 's-Hertogenbosch

23 April 2011
15:00

Atasport (Azerbaijan)	0–2	(Netherlands) Laren
	Report

HC Den Bosch, 's-Hertogenbosch

24 April 2011
15:00

Laren (Netherlands)	3–0	(England) Slough
Lammers 13', 38'; De Ruiter 30'	Report

HC Den Bosch, 's-Hertogenbosch

=== Classification round ===
==== Ninth to twelfth place classification ====
25 April 2011
10:00

Volga (Russia)	2–5	(Azerbaijan) Atasport
	Report

HC Den Bosch, 's-Hertogenbosch

25 April 2011
10:45

Royal Antwerp (Belgium)	2–3	(Belarus) Grodno
	Report

HC Den Bosch, 's-Hertogenbosch

==== First to eighth place classification ====
Quarter-finals
25 April 2011
(Germany) Berliner	0
(England) Leicester	1
25 April 2011
(Spain) Club de Campo	2 (3)
(England) Slough (pen.)	2 (4)
25 April 2011
(Netherlands) Laren	5
(Germany) Hamburg	1
25 April 2011
(Netherlands) Den Bosch	10
(Spain) Terrassa	0

Semi-finals
10 June 2011
(England) Leicester (pen.)	1 (2)
(England) Slough	1 (0)
10 June 2011
(Netherlands) Laren	0
(Netherlands) Den Bosch	1

Final
12 June 2011
(England) Leicester	1
(Netherlands) Den Bosch	4
Third place
11 June 2011
(England) Slough	1
(Netherlands) Laren	2

===== Quarter-finals =====
25 April 2011
12:30

Laren (Netherlands)	5–1	(Germany) Hamburg
Welten 6'; Hentenaar 15'; De Lange 23'; Lammers 47'; Müller 67'	Report	Hoffmann 25'

HC Den Bosch, 's-Hertogenbosch

25 April 2011
13:15

Berliner (Germany)	0–1	(England) Leicester
	Report	Turner 32'

HC Den Bosch, 's-Hertogenbosch

25 April 2011
15:00

Club de Campo (Spain)	2–2	(England) Slough
Rebecchi 18'; Crúz 70'	Report	Penny 13'; Ball 32'
Penalties
Rebecchi (penalty shoot-out missed); Crúz (penalty shoot-out scored); Di Bernardo (penalty shoot-out scored) —— Rebecchi (penalty shoot-out scored); Crúz (penalty shoot-out missed)	3–4	(penalty shoot-out scored) White; (penalty shoot-out scored) Ball; (penalty shoot-out missed) Scott —— (penalty shoot-out scored) White; (penalty shoot-out scored) Ball

HC Den Bosch, 's-Hertogenbosch

25 April 2011
15:45

Den Bosch (Netherlands)	10–0	(Spain) Terrassa
Paumen (2); S. Mol (3); De Beaumont (2); Van Geffen (1); Vorstenbosch (1); Welten (1)	Report

HC Den Bosch, 's-Hertogenbosch

===== Semi-finals =====
10 June 2011
17:30

Leicester (England)	1–1	(England) Slough
Long 11'	Report	Strong 30'
Penalties
Rogers (penalty shoot-out scored); Panter (penalty shoot-out scored)	2–0	(penalty shoot-out missed) White; (penalty shoot-out missed) Ball

Wassenor Stadium, The Hague

10 June 2011
20:45

Laren (Netherlands)	0–1	(Netherlands) Den Bosch
	Report	Paumen 23'

Wassenor Stadium, The Hague

===== Third and fourth place =====
11 June 2011
16:30

Slough (England)	1–2	(Netherlands) Laren
Penny 67'	Report	Welten 10'; Van As 77'

Wassenor Stadium, The Hague

===== Final =====
12 June 2011
13:00

Leicester (England)	1–4	(Netherlands) Den Bosch
Cullen 6'	Report	Paumen 21', 64'; S. Mol 28', 42'

Wassenor Stadium, The Hague

== Statistics ==
=== Final standings ===
As per statistical convention in field hockey, matches decided in extra time are counted as wins and losses, while matches decided by penalty shoot-outs are counted as draws.

Pos	Team	Pld	W	D	L	GF	GA	GD	Pts	Final Result
1st place, gold medalist(s)	(Netherlands) Den Bosch	5	5	0	0	26	2	+24	15	Gold Medal
2nd place, silver medalist(s)	(England) Leicester	5	2	1	2	7	9	−2	7	Silver Medal
3rd place, bronze medalist(s)	(Netherlands) Laren	5	4	0	1	12	3	+9	12	Bronze Medal
4	(England) Slough	5	1	2	2	6	8	−2	5	Fourth Place
5	(Germany) Berliner	3	2	0	1	11	1	+10	6	Eliminated in Quarter-finals
6	(Spain) Club de Campo	3	1	2	0	9	4	+5	5	Eliminated in Quarter-finals
7	(Germany) Hamburg	3	1	1	1	6	8	−2	4	Eliminated in Quarter-finals
8	(Spain) Terrassa	3	1	0	2	3	19	−16	3	Eliminated in Quarter-finals
9	(Azerbaijan) Atasport	3	1	0	2	5	6	−1	3	Eliminated in Group Stage
10	(Belarus) Grodno	3	1	0	2	5	9	−4	3	Eliminated in Group Stage
11	(Russia) Volga	3	0	0	3	3	13	−10	0	Eliminated in Group Stage
12	(Belgium) Royal Antwerp	3	0	0	3	3	14	−11	0	Eliminated in Group Stage

Source: Deutscher Hockey-Bund

== Lower categories ==
=== Champions Trophy (2nd division) ===
#	Team
1	(Belarus) Viktoria Smolevichi
2	(Belgium) Royal Wellington
3	(Ireland) Railway Union
4	(Scotland) Grove Menzieshill
5	(Ukraine) Sumchanka
6	(Russia) Metrostroy Saint Petersburg
7	(Italy) Libertas San Saba
	(Ukraine) Kolos Borispol (disqualified)

=== Challenge I (3rd division) ===
#	Pool 1	Pool 2
1	(Lithuania) Gintra Strekte	(Czech Republic) Prague 1946
3	(Italy) Lorenzoni	(Czech Republic) Slavia Prague
5	(Austria) Wels	(France) Montrouge
7	(Scotland) Glasgow Western	(Azerbaijan) Baku

=== Challenge II (4th division) ===
#	Pool 1	Pool 2
1	(Switzerland) Rot-Weiss Wettingen	(Ireland) Loreto
3	(Switzerland) Olten	(France) Lille
5	(Wales) Penarth	(Wales) Swansea
7		(Austria) Wien

=== Challenge III (5th division) ===
#	Pool 1	Pool 2
1	(Croatia) Zrinjevac	(Bulgaria) NSA Sofia
3	(Denmark) Gentofte	(Slovakia) Raca
5	(Greece) Imittos	(Slovenia) Moravske Toplice
