= 2017 EuroHockey Club Champions Cup =

EHCCC 2017

Tournament details
- Host country: Netherlands
- City: 's-Hertogenbosch
- Dates: 2–5 June 2017
- Teams: 8
- Venue: 1

Final positions
- Champions: HC Den Bosch (15th title)
- Runner-up: Uhlenhorster HC
- Third place: Amsterdam H&BC

Tournament statistics
- Matches played: 12
- Goals scored: 67 (5.58 per match)
- Top scorer: Maartje Paumen (6 goals)
- Best player: Maartje Paumen

The 2017 EuroHockey Club Champions Cup was the 45th edition of the premier European competition for women's field hockey clubs. HC Den Bosch and 's-Hertogenbosch hosted the championship tournament for the seventh time. The tournament took place from 2 to 5 June. Eight teams from six countries participated in the tournament.

== Results ==
=== Bracket ===
Quarter-finals
2 June
(Netherlands) Den Bosch	9
(Ireland) Hermes-Monkstown	0
2 June
(England) Surbiton	2
(Spain) Complutense	1
2 June
(Germany) UHC Hamburg	5
(England) Canterbury	0
2 June
(Russia) Krylatskoye	0
(Netherlands) Amsterdam	8

Semi-finals
3 June
(Netherlands) Den Bosch	7
(England) Surbiton	1
3 June
(Germany) UHC Hamburg (s.o.)	2 (3)
(Netherlands) Amsterdam	2 (1)

Final
5 June
(Netherlands) Den Bosch	2
(Germany) UHC Hamburg	1
Third place
5 June
(England) Surbiton	1
(Netherlands) Amsterdam	3

=== Quarter-finals ===
2 June
13:15

Surbiton (England)	2–1	(Spain) Complutense
Evans 33'; Pearne-Webb 50'	Report	García 36'

Umpires:
Michelle Meister (GER)
Lisette Baljon (NED)

2 June
15:30

Uhlenhorster (Germany)	5–0	(England) Canterbury
Stapenhorst 7'; Wilde 12', 34'; Mayen 36'; Mävers 60'	Report

Umpires:
Pilar Lopez Martinez (ESP)
Laurine Delforge (BEL)

2 June
17:45

Krylatskoye (Russia)	0–8	(Netherlands) Amsterdam
	Report	Müller 6', 44'; Vega 34', 36'; Benninga 37'; Verschoor 46', 57'; Van Male 60'

Umpires:
Sophie Bockelmann (GER)
Ivona Makar (CRO)

2 June
20:00

HC Den Bosch (Netherlands)	9–0	(Ireland) Hermes-Monkstown
Paumen 5', 14'; Matla 26', 31'; Van der Hoek 41'; Sanders 42'; Omrani 54'; Van den Assem 55'; Verbruggen 60'	Report

Umpires:
Sarah Wilson (SCO)
Emma Shelbourn (ENG)

=== Fifth to eighth place classification ===
Crossover
4 June
(England) Canterbury	3
(Russia) Krylatskoye	1
4 June
(Ireland) Hermes-Monkstown	1
(Spain) Complutense	4

Fifth place
5 June
(England) Canterbury	3 (2)
(Spain) Complutense (p.s.o)	3 (3)
Seventh place
5 June
(Russia) Krylatskoye	4 (0)
(Ireland) Hermes-Monkstown (p.s.o)	4 (3)

==== Crossover ====
4 June
10:45

Canterbury (England)	3–1	(Russia) Krylatskoye
Balsdon 25', 48'; Griggs 52'	Report	Khalmuratova 39'

Umpires:
Pilar Lopez Martinez (ESP)
Lisette Baljon (NED)

4 June
13:00

Hermes-Monkstown (Ireland)	1–4	(Spain) Complutense
O'Flanagan 39'	Report	García 3'; Riera 15', 41'; Rodriguez 58'

Umpires:
Emma Shelbourn (ENG)
Sophie Bockelmann (GER)

==== Seventh and eighth place ====
5 June
09:00

Krylatskoye (Russia)	4–4	(Ireland) Hermes-Monkstown
Sadovaia 4'; Khalimova 20', 39'; Kazakova 59'	Report	O'Flanagan 3', 42'; Evans 29'; Loughran 50'
Penalties
Sartakova (penalty shoot-out missed); Kazakova (penalty shoot-out missed); Frolova (penalty shoot-out missed)	0–3	(penalty shoot-out scored) Kelly; (penalty shoot-out scored) O'Flanagan; (penalty shoot-out missed) Ch. Watkins; (penalty shoot-out scored) Pinder

Umpires:
Emma Shelbourn (ENG)
Pilar Lopez Martinez (ESP)

==== Fifth and sixth place ====
5 June
11:00

Canterbury (England)	3–3	(Spain) Complutense
Kerly 10'; Vankemmel 47'; Balsdon 55'	Report	Rodriguez 4', 40'; Sanchez-Valverde 59'
Penalties
Kerly (penalty shoot-out missed); Balsdon (penalty shoot-out scored); Del Borrello (penalty shoot-out scored); Turner (penalty shoot-out missed); Clewlow (penalty shoot-out missed) —— Clewlow (penalty shoot-out missed)	2–3	(penalty shoot-out missed) Sanchez-Valverde; (penalty shoot-out missed) Jiménez; (penalty shoot-out scored) García; (penalty shoot-out scored) Rodriguez; (penalty shoot-out missed) Riera —— (penalty shoot-out scored) García

Umpires:
Sophie Bockelmann (GER)
Lisette Baljon (NED)

=== First to fourth place classification ===
==== Semi-finals ====
3 June
15:00

Uhlenhorster (Germany)	2–2	(Netherlands) Amsterdam
Hoffmann 55'; Wilde 60'	Report	Van Male 41'; Vega 49'
Penalties
Dudurov (penalty shoot-out missed); Wilde (penalty shoot-out missed); Mävers (penalty shoot-out scored); Teschke (penalty shoot-out scored); Altenburg (penalty shoot-out scored)	3–1	(penalty shoot-out missed) Verschoor; (penalty shoot-out missed) De Baat; (penalty shoot-out scored) Lambers; (penalty shoot-out missed) Stam

Umpires:
Laurine Delforge (BEL)
Sarah Wilson (SCO)

3 June
17:15

Den Bosch (Netherlands)	7–1	(England) Surbiton
Keil 18'; Krekelaar 37'; Paumen 38', 43', 49'; Van Geffen 45', 55'	Report	Pearne-Webb 26'

Umpires:
Michelle Meister (GER)
Ivona Makar (CRO)

==== Third place ====
5 June
13:00

Amsterdam (Netherlands)	3–1	(England) Surbiton
Müller 15'; Stam 24'; Vega 32'	Report	Pearne-Webb 28'

Umpires:
Michelle Meister (GER)
Ivona Makar (CRO)

==== Final ====
5 June
15:00

Uhlenhorster (Germany)	1–2	(Netherlands) Den Bosch
Hoffmann 22'	Report	Paumen 10'; Sanders 45'

Umpires:
Laurine Delforge (BEL)
Sarah Wilson (SCO)

== Awards ==
Player of the Tournament	Top Goalscorer	Goalkeeper of the Tournament
(Netherlands) Maartje Paumen (Den Bosch)	(Netherlands) Maartje Paumen (Den Bosch)	(Germany) Yvonne Frank (Uhlenhorster)

== Statistics ==
=== Final standings ===
Pos	Team	Pld	W	D	L	GF	GA	GD	Pts	Final Result
1st place, gold medalist(s)	(Netherlands) Den Bosch	3	3	0	0	18	2	+16	9	Gold Medal
2nd place, silver medalist(s)	(Germany) Uhlenhorster	3	1	1	1	8	4	+4	4	Silver Medal
3rd place, bronze medalist(s)	(Netherlands) Amsterdam	3	2	1	0	13	3	+10	7	Bronze Medal
4	(England) Surbiton	3	1	0	2	4	11	−7	3	Fourth Place
5	(Spain) Complutense	3	1	1	1	8	6	+2	4	Fifth Place
6	(England) Canterbury	3	1	1	1	6	9	−3	4	Sixth Place
7	(Ireland) Hermes-Monkstown	3	0	1	2	5	17	−12	1	Seventh Place
8	(Russia) Krylatskoye	3	0	1	2	5	15	−10	1	Eighth Place

Source: EHF
