= 2013 EuroHockey Club Champions Cup =

Tournament details
- Host country: Netherlands
- City: Bloemendaal
- Dates: 25–27 May
- Teams: 8
- Venue: HC Bloemendaal

Final positions
- Champions: (Netherlands) Den Bosch (13th title)
- Runner-up: (Netherlands) Laren

Tournament statistics
- Matches played: 15
- Goals scored: 59 (3.93 per match)
- Top scorer: (Netherlands) Kim Lammers (LAR) (6 goals)

The 2013 EuroHockey Club Champions Cup was the 41st edition of the premier European competition for women's field hockey clubs. The preliminary round of the competition was held in Hamburg, Germany from 29 March–1 April, while the final of the competition was held in Bloemendaal, Netherlands on 19 May.

Den Bosch defeated defending champion Laren in the final 4–2 to win their thirteenth title. Hamburg and Rot-Weiss Köln also reached the final four, losing in the semi-finals.

== Teams ==
- (Azerbaijan) Atasport
- (Belarus) Grodno
- (England) Leicester
- (Germany) Hamburg (HAM)
- (Germany) Rot-Weiss Köln (ROT)
- (Netherlands) Den Bosch (DBO)
- (Netherlands) Laren (LAR)
- (Spain) Club de Campo

== Results ==
=== Preliminary round ===
==== Pool A ====
Pos	Team	Pld	W	D	L	GF	GA	GD	Pts	Qualification	Netherlands	Germany	Spain	Belarus
1	(Netherlands) Den Bosch	3	3	0	0	12	2	+10	9	Semi-finals	—		7–1	2–0
2	(Germany) Hamburg	3	1	1	1	5	5	0	4	Semi-finals	1–3	—		2–2
3	(Spain) Club de Campo	3	1	0	2	5	9	−4	3			0–2	—	4–0
4	(Belarus) Grodno	3	0	1	2	2	8	−6	1					—

Source: LesSports

29 March 2013
15:00

Den Bosch (Netherlands)	7–1	(Spain) Club de Campo
Hulsen 8', 57'; Paumen 17+', 34'; S. Mol 40'; Welten 49'; Vorstenbosch 61'	Report	Pérez 7'

UHC Hamburg, Germany
Umpires:
Christiane Hippler (GER)
Elena Eskina (RUS)

29 March 2013
17:00

Hamburg (Germany)	2–2	(Belarus) Grodno
Tahal 49'; Hillmann 70'	Report	Laptsievich 21'; Bahushevich 66'

UHC Hamburg, Germany
Umpires:
Lia Waine (ENG)
Saadat Zakiyeva (AZE)

30 March 2013
15:00

Club de Campo (Spain)	4–0	(Belarus) Grodno
López 32'; Mowinckel 34'; Malda 64'; Iglesias 67'	Report

UHC Hamburg, Germany
Umpires:
Claire Druijts (NED)
Lia Waine (ENG)

30 March 2013
17:00

Hamburg (Germany)	1–3	(Netherlands) Den Bosch
Tahal 25'	Report	Hulsen 43'; De Blaeij 56', 59'

UHC Hamburg, Germany
Umpires:
Claire Adenot (FRA)
Saadat Zakiyeva (AZE)

31 March 2013
15:00

Den Bosch (Netherlands)	2–0	(Belarus) Grodno
Brugts 51'; S. Mol 54'	Report

UHC Hamburg, Germany
Umpires:
Christiane Hippler (GER)
Saadat Zakiyeva (AZE)

31 March 2013
17:00

Club de Campo (Spain)	0–2	(Germany) Hamburg
	Report	J. Müller-Wieland 18'; Teschke 60'

UHC Hamburg, Germany
Umpires:
Claire Druijts (NED)
Claire Adenot (FRA)

==== Pool B ====
Pos	Team	Pld	W	D	L	GF	GA	GD	Pts	Qualification	Netherlands	Germany	England	Azerbaijan
1	(Netherlands) Laren	3	3	0	0	9	2	+7	9	Semi-finals	—		2–1	5–0
2	(Germany) Rot-Weiss Köln	3	1	1	1	5	4	+1	4	Semi-finals	1–2	—		3–1
3	(England) Leicester	3	1	1	1	4	3	+1	4			1–1	—	2–0
4	(Azerbaijan) Atasport	3	0	0	3	1	10	−9	0					—

Source: LesSports

29 March 2013
11:00

Laren (Netherlands)	2–1	(England) Leicester
Van Broek 1'; Kerstholt 38'	Report	Williams 8'

UHC Hamburg, Germany
Umpires:
Claire Adenot (FRA)
Pilar López Martínez (ESP)

29 March 2013
13:00

Rot-Weiss Köln (Germany)	3–1	(Azerbaijan) Atasport
Hauke 22'; Grote 38'; Geiter 39'	Report	Muradi 35'

UHC Hamburg, Germany
Umpires:
Stella Bartlema (NED)
Nastassia Shcharbakova (BLR)

30 March 2013
11:00

Leicester (England)	2–0	(Azerbaijan) Atasport
Long 26'; Hunter 62'	Report

UHC Hamburg, Germany
Umpires:
Gabriele Schmitz (GER)
Stella Bartlema (NED)

30 March 2013
13:00

Rot-Weiss Köln (Germany)	1–2	(Netherlands) Laren
Hauke 8'	Report	De Ruiter 24'; Lammers 64'

UHC Hamburg, Germany
Umpires:
Pilar López Martínez (ESP)
Elena Eskina (RUS)

31 March 2013
11:00

Laren (Netherlands)	5–0	(Azerbaijan) Atasport
Lammers 10', 28'; Hentenaar 35'; Roosen 61'; Kerstholt 66'	Report

UHC Hamburg, Germany
Umpires:
Gabriele Schmitz (GER)
Nastassia Shcharbakova (BLR)

31 March 2013
13:00

Leicester (England)	1–1	(Germany) Rot-Weiss Köln
Cockayne 46'	Report	Geiter 14'

UHC Hamburg, Germany
Umpires:
Stella Bartlema (NED)
Elena Eskina (RUS)

=== Classification round ===
Semi-finals
1 April 2013
(Netherlands) Den Bosch	3
(Germany) Rot-Weiss Köln	0
1 April 2013
(Netherlands) Laren	4
(Germany) Hamburg	3

Grand Final
19 May 2013
(Netherlands) Den Bosch	4
(Netherlands) Laren	2

==== Semi-finals ====
1 April 2013
13:00

Den Bosch (Netherlands)	3–0	(Germany) Rot-Weiss Köln
Paumen 2', 7'; Keetels 29'	Report

UHC Hamburg, Germany
Umpires:
Claire Adenot (FRA)
Pilar López Martínez (ESP)

1 April 2013
15:15

Laren (Netherlands)	4–3	(Germany) Hamburg
De Lange 32'; Schortinghus 45'; De Ruiter 54'; Lammers 70'	Report	Mävers 18'; Hillmann 27', 67'

UHC Hamburg, Germany
Umpires:
Lia Waine (ENG)
Elena Eskina (RUS)

==== Final ====
19 May 2013
12:45

Den Bosch (Netherlands)	4–2	(Netherlands) Laren
S. Mol 1', 23'; Paumen 48'; Vorstenbosch 56'	Report	Lammers 22', 40'

HC Bloemendaal, Netherlands
Umpires:
Claire Adenot (FRA)
Elena Eskina (RUS)

== Statistics ==
=== Final standings ===
Pos	Team	Pld	W	D	L	GF	GA	GD	Pts	Final Result
1st place, gold medalist(s)	(Netherlands) Den Bosch	5	5	0	0	19	4	+15	15	Gold Medal
2nd place, silver medalist(s)	(Netherlands) Laren	5	4	0	1	15	9	+6	12	Silver Medal
3	(Germany) Hamburg	4	1	1	2	8	9	−1	4	Eliminated in Semi-finals
4	(Germany) Rot-Weiss Köln	4	1	1	2	5	7	−2	4	Eliminated in Semi-finals
5	(England) Leicester	3	1	1	1	4	3	+1	4	Eliminated in Group Stage
6	(Spain) Club de Campo	3	1	0	2	5	9	−4	3	Eliminated in Group Stage
7	(Belarus) Grodno	3	0	1	2	2	8	−6	1	Eliminated in Group Stage
8	(Azerbaijan) Atasport	3	0	0	3	1	10	−9	0	Eliminated in Group Stage

Source: LesSports

=== Goalscorers ===
There were 59 goals scored in 15 matches, for an average of 3.93 goals per match.

6 goals

- (Netherlands) Kim Lammers (LAR)

5 goals

- (Netherlands) Maartje Paumen (DBO)

4 goals

- (Netherlands) Sabine Mol (DBO)

3 goals

- (Germany) Kristina Hillmann (HAM)
- (Netherlands) Lieke Hulsen (DBO)

2 goals

- (Germany) Anna Geiter (ROT)
- (Germany) Franzisca Hauke (ROT)
- (Germany) Vivian Tahal (HAM)
- (Netherlands) Merel de Blaeij (DBO)
- (Netherlands) Maxime Kerstholt (LAR)
- (Netherlands) Macey de Ruiter (LAR)
- (Netherlands) Vera Vorstenbosch (DBO)

1 goal

- (Azerbaijan) Yuliya Muradi
- (Belarus) Sviatlana Bahushevich
- (Belarus) Yulia Laptsievich
- (England) Sarah Cockayne
- (England) Jo Hunter
- (England) Katie Long
- (England) Kerry Williams
- (Germany) Rebecca Grote (ROT)
- (Germany) Marie Mävers (HAM)
- (Germany) Janne Müller-Wieland (HAM)
- (Germany) Jana Teschke (HAM)
- (Netherlands) Vicky van Broek (LAR)
- (Netherlands) Pauline Brugts (DBO)
- (Netherlands) Juliette Hentenaar (LAR)
- (Netherlands) Marloes Keetels (DBO)
- (Netherlands) Lisanne de Lange (LAR)
- (Netherlands) Fabienne Roosen (LAR)
- (Netherlands) Noortje Schortinghus (LAR)
- (Netherlands) Lidewij Welten (DBO)
- (Spain) Belén Iglesias
- (Spain) María López
- (Spain) Bárbara Malda
- (Spain) Andrea Mowinckel
- (Spain) Beatriz Pérez
