= 2014 EuroHockey Club Champions Cup =

Tournament details
- Host country: Netherlands
- City: 's-Hertogenbosch
- Dates: 18–21 April
- Teams: 8
- Venue: 1

Final positions
- Champions: Amsterdam H&BC (13th title)
- Runner-up: HC Den Bosch
- Third place: Uhlenhorster HC

Tournament statistics
- Matches played: 12
- Goals scored: 56 (4.67 per match)
- Top scorer: Eva de Goede (5 goals)
- Best player: Lidewij Welten

The 2014 EuroHockey Club Champions Cup is the 42nd edition of the premier European competition for women's field hockey clubs. It was played in 's-Hertogenbosch, Netherlands from 18 to 21 April 2014. There was no round-robin as the eight teams were placed in the bracket starting from the quarter-finals. The winning teams advanced to the semi-finals and the losing teams played placement matches. Host team HC Den Bosch was the defending champion. Dutch teams dominated the tournament. In the final Amsterdam H&BC met the hosts. Normal time ended 2–2 and the winner was decided in a penalty shoot-out. Amsterdam H&BC won 3–0. Uhlenhorster HC took third place by defeating Real Sociedad in the bronze match 1–1 (4–2)p.

== Champions Cup ==
Fifth place
(England) Reading HC	4
(Germany) Berliner HC	0
Seventh place
(Azerbaijan) Atasport	2
(Ireland) Railway Union HC	5

Consolation semifinals
(Azerbaijan) Atasport	1
(England) Reading HC	3
(Germany) Berliner HC (p.s.o.)	1 (1)
(Ireland) Railway Union HC	1 (0)

Quarterfinals
(Netherlands) Amsterdam H&BC	9
(Azerbaijan) Atasport	0
(England) Reading HC	2 (2)
(Germany) Uhlenhorster HC (p.s.o.)	2 (3)
(Germany) Berliner HC	0
(Spain) Real Sociedad	1
(Ireland) Railway Union HC	0
(Netherlands) HC Den Bosch	7

Semifinals
(Netherlands) Amsterdam H&BC	3
(Germany) Uhlenhorster HC	1
(Spain) Real Sociedad	0
(Netherlands) HC Den Bosch	8

Final
(Netherlands) Amsterdam H&BC (p.s.o.)	2 (3)
(Netherlands) HC Den Bosch	2 (0)
Third place
(Germany) Uhlenhorster HC (p.s.o.)	1 (4)
(Spain) Real Sociedad	1 (2)

=== Quarter-finals ===
18 April 2014
09:30

Amsterdam H&BC (Netherlands)	9 – 0	(Azerbaijan) Atasport
de Goede 2', 6'; Hoog 8'; Mikdad 19'; Vega 28', 40'; Holleman 44'; Jonker 52' van Male 69'	Report

Umpires:
Elena Eskina (RUS)
Alison Keogh(IRE)

18 April 2014
12:00

Reading HC (England)	1 – 1	(Germany) Uhlenhorster HC
Gilbert 58'	Report	Tahal 70'
Penalties
(penalty shoot-out missed) (penalty shoot-out missed); Gilbert (penalty shoot-out scored) (penalty shoot-out missed); K. Richardson-Walsh (penalty shoot-out scored)	2 – 3	(penalty shoot-out missed) (penalty shoot-out missed); (penalty shoot-out scored) Tahal; (penalty shoot-out scored) Mävers; (penalty shoot-out scored) Hillmann

Umpires:
Caroline Brunekreef (NED)
Claire Adenot (FRA)

18 April 2014
14:30

Berliner HC (Germany)	0 – 1	(Spain) Real Sociedad
	Report	Marana 25'

Umpires:
Frances Block (ENG)
Claire Druijts (NED)

18 April 2014
17:00

Railway Union HC (Ireland)	0 – 7	(Netherlands) HC Den Bosch
	Report	Welten 2'; Vorstenbosch 3', 14'; Krekelaar 39'; Keetels 52'; Matla 63'; Mol 67'

Umpires:
Sadaat Zakiyeva (AZE)
Michelle Meister (GER)

=== Fifth to eighth place classification ===
==== Crossover ====
19 April 2014
14:30

Atasport (Azerbaijan)	1 – 3	(England) Reading HC
Tsiganska 48'	Report	Danson 6'; Hunt 31'; Wilkinson 70'

Umpires:
Alison Keogh (IRE)
Gabrielle Schmitz (GER)

19 April 2014
17:00

Berliner HC (Germany)	1 – 1	(Ireland) Railway Union HC
Schnitzer 31'	Report	McDonnell 34'
Penalties
(penalty shoot-out missed) (penalty shoot-out missed) (penalty shoot-out missed) (penalty shoot-out missed); Wieske (penalty shoot-out scored)	1 – 0	Penalty shoot-out missed

Umpires:
Caroline Brunekreef (NED)
Sarah Wilson (SCO)

==== Seventh and eighth place ====
21 April 2014
09:30

Atasport (Azerbaijan)	2 – 5	(Ireland) Railway Union HC
Tsiganska 44'; Aliyeva 55'	Report	Dooley 7', 36'; Dillon 25'; Lloyd 62', 64'

Umpires:
Michelle Meister (GER)
Gabrielle Schmitz (GER)

==== Fifth and sixth place ====
21 April 2014
12:00

Reading HC (England)	4 – 0	(Germany) Berliner HC
Halle 25'; Cockburn 29'; Wilkinson 49'; Smith 61'	Report

Umpires:
Claire Druijts (NED)
Alison Keogh(IRE)

=== First to fourth place classification ===
==== Semi-finals ====
20 April 2014
14:30

Amsterdam H&BC (Netherlands)	3 – 1	(Germany) Uhlenhorster HC
Jonker 41' de Goede 46', 51'	Report	Altenburg 8'

Umpires:
Sarah Wilson (SCO)
Frances Block (ENG)

20 April 2014
17:00

Real Sociedad (Spain)	0 – 8	(Netherlands) HC Den Bosch
	Report	Goderie 2'; Paumen 27', 38', 49'; Welten 35', 57'; Mol 53'; Vorstenbosch 65'

Umpires:
Michelle Meister (GER)
Claire Adenot (FRA)

==== Third place ====
21 April 2014
14:30

Uhlenhorster HC (Germany)	1 – 1	(Spain) Real Sociedad
Hillmann 55'	Report	Guajardo 33'
Penalties
Penalty shoot-out scored	4 – 2	Penalty shoot-out missed Penalty shoot-out scored

Umpires:
Caroline Brunekreef (NED)
Sadaat Zakiyeva (AZE)

==== Final ====
21 April 2014
17:00

Amsterdam H&BC (Netherlands)	2 – 2	(Netherlands) HC Den Bosch
de Goede 44'; Jonker 59'	Report	Paumen 5'; Welten 43'
Penalties
Penalty shoot-out scored Penalty shoot-out missed	3 – 0	Penalty shoot-out missed

Umpires:
Frances Block (ENG)
Claire Adenot (FRA)

== Statistics ==
=== Final ranking ===
1. (Netherlands) Amsterdam H&CB
2. (Netherlands) HC Den Bosch
3. (Germany) Uhlenhorster HC
4. (Spain) Real Sociedad
5. (England) Reading HC
6. (Germany) Berliner HC
7. (Ireland) Railway Union HC
8. (Azerbaijan) Atasport

=== Awards ===
Individual player awards:

- Player of the Tournament: Lidewij Welten (Netherlands) HC Den Bosch
- Top goalscorer: Eva de Goede (Netherlands) Amsterdam H&CB
- Goalkeeper of the Tournament: Yvonne Frank (Germany) Uhlenhorster HC

=== Top goalscorers ===
Rank	Player	Team	Goals
1	(Netherlands) Eva de Goede	(Netherlands) Amsterdam H&BC	5
2	(Netherlands) Maartje Paumen	(Netherlands) HC Den Bosch	4
2	(Netherlands) Lidewij Welten	(Netherlands) HC Den Bosch	4
3	(Netherlands) Kelly Jonker	(Netherlands) Amsterdam H&BC	3
3	(Netherlands) Vera Vorstenbosch	(Netherlands) HC Den Bosch	3
4	(Ireland) Sinead Dooley	(Ireland) Railway Union HC	2
4	(Ireland) Kate Lloyd	(Ireland) Railway Union HC	2
4	(Netherlands) Sabine Mol	(Netherlands) HC Den Bosch	2
4	(Azerbaijan) Anastasiya Tsiganska	(Azerbaijan) Atasport	2
4	(Netherlands) Charlotte Vega	(Netherlands) Amsterdam H&BC	2
4	(England) Leah Wilkinson	(England) Reading HC	2
