= 2015 Women's EuroHockey Club Trophy =

Tournament details
- Host country: Belarus
- City: Minsk
- Dates: 21–24 May
- Teams: 8
- Venue: HC Minsk

Final positions
- Champions: (Germany) Hamburg (1st title)
- Runner-up: (Belgium) Royal Wellington
- Third place: (Belarus) Minsk

Tournament statistics
- Matches played: 16
- Goals scored: 63 (3.94 per match)
- Top scorer: (6 players) (3 goals)

The 2015 Women's EuroHockey Club Trophy was the 39th edition of the women's Women's EuroHockey Club Trophy, Europe's secondary club field hockey tournament organized by the EHF. It was held from 21 to 24 May 2015 in Minsk, Belarus.

Hamburg won the tournament after defeating Royal Wellington 10–1 in the final. Minsk finished third, after defeating Atasport 4–1 in the third place playoff.

== Teams ==
- (Azerbaijan) Atasport
- (Belarus) Minsk
- (Belgium) Royal Wellington
- (Germany) Hamburg
- (Ireland) Pembroke Wanderers
- (Russia) Metrostroy
- (Spain) Real Sociedad
- (Ukraine) Sumchanka

== Results ==
=== Preliminary round ===
==== Pool A ====
Pos	Team	Pld	W	D	L	GF	GA	GD	Pts	Qualification
1	(Germany) Hamburg	3	3	0	0	10	2	+8	15	Final
2	(Belarus) Minsk	3	2	0	1	7	7	0	10	
3	(Spain) Real Sociedad	3	1	0	2	4	6	−2	6	
4	(Russia) Metrostroy	3	0	0	3	1	7	−6	2	

Source: EHF

21 May 2015
15:30

Hamburg (Germany)	2–0	(Russia) Metrostroy
Teschke 32'; Mävers 57'	Report

Umpires:
Celine Martin-Schmets (BEL)
Tatyana Kaltypan (UKR)

21 May 2015
17:45

Real Sociedad (Spain)	1–3	(Belarus) Minsk
Altuna 33'	Report	Batura 22'; Khilko 35'; Sazhina 70'

Umpires:
Vilma Bagdanskiene (LTU)
Saadat Zakiyeva (AZE)

22 May 2015
14:30

Real Sociedad (Spain)	0–3	(Germany) Hamburg
	Report	Altenburg 11'; Müller-Wieland 33'; Hoffmann 33'

Umpires:
Ymkje van Slooten (NED)
Celine Martin-Schmets (BEL)

22 May 2015
16:45

Metrostroy (Russia)	1–2	(Belarus) Minsk
Fedorova 69'	Report	Papkova 54'; Khilko 60'

Umpires:
Tara Browne (IRE)
Tatyana Kaltypan (UKR)

24 May 2015
14:30

Metrostroy (Russia)	0–3	(Spain) Real Sociedad
	Report	Nolting 7', 42'; Guajardo 35'

Umpires:
Tara Browne (IRE)
Ymkje van Slooten (NED)

24 May 2015
16:45

Hamburg (Germany)	5–2	(Belarus) Minsk
Müller 48', 66'; Tahal 54'; Hoffmann 58'; Teschke 60'	Report	Sazhina 31'; Filipovich 70'

Umpires:
Saadat Zakiyeva (AZE)
Tatyana Kaltypan (UKR)

==== Pool B ====
Pos	Team	Pld	W	D	L	GF	GA	GD	Pts	Qualification
1	(Belgium) Royal Wellington	3	1	2	0	5	2	+3	9	Final
2	(Azerbaijan) Atasport	3	1	2	0	6	5	+1	9	
3	(Ukraine) Sumchanka	3	1	1	1	2	2	0	8	
4	(Ireland) Pembroke Wanderers	3	0	1	2	2	6	−4	3	

Source: EHF

21 May 2015
11:00

Atasport (Azerbaijan)	2–1	(Ukraine) Sumchanka
Tsyganska 27'; Druzhinina 41'	Report	Stetsenko 42'

Umpires:
Gema Calderón (ESP)
Ymkje van Slooten (NED)

21 May 2015
13:15

Pembroke Wanderers (Ireland)	0–3	(Belgium) Royal Wellington
	Report	Pourbaix 30'; Meuwese 33'; Valcke 38'

Umpires:
Liudmila Aleinikoviene (BLR)
Anastasia Grigorieva (RUS)

22 May 2015
10:00

Sumchanka (Ukraine)	0–0	(Belgium) Royal Wellington
	Report

Umpires:
Vilma Bagdanskiene (LTU)
Anastasia Grigorieva (RUS)

22 May 2015
12:15

Pembroke Wanderers (Ireland)	2–2	(Azerbaijan) Atasport
So. Clarke 33'; Ward 39'	Report	Mammadova 34'; Aliyeva 64'

Umpires:
Liudmila Aleinikoviene (BLR)
Angelika Koppen (GER)

23 May 2015
10:00

Atasport (Azerbaijan)	2–2	(Belgium) Royal Wellington
Mammadova 12'; Druzhinina 61'	Report	Meuwese 27', 58'

Umpires:
Liudmila Aleinikoviene (BLR)
Gema Calderón (ESP)

23 May 2015
12:15

Sumchanka (Ukraine)	1–0	(Ireland) Pembroke Wanderers
Stelnyk 69'	Report

Umpires:
Vilma Bagdanskiene (LTU)
Angelika Koppen (GER)

=== Classification round ===
==== Seventh and eighth place ====
24 May 2015
08:15

Metrostroy (Russia)	5–1	(Ireland) Pembroke Wanderers
Fedorova 19'; Imranova 41', 53', 58'; Dianova 63'	Report	Scott 56'

Umpires:
Angelika Koppen (GER)
Saadat Zakiyeva (AZE)

==== Fifth and sixth place ====
24 May 2015
10:30

Real Sociedad (Spain)	3–1	(Ukraine) Sumchanka
Maraña 12'; Guajardo 34', 66'	Report	Sitalo 42'

Umpires:
Tara Browne (IRE)
Anastasia Grigorieva (RUS)

==== Third and fourth place ====
24 May 2015
12:45

Minsk (Belarus)	4–1	(Azerbaijan) Atasport
Batura 17', 55'; Papkova 28'; Tsabrova 32'	Report	Tsyganska 48'

Umpires:
Celine Martin-Schmets (BEL)
Gema Calderón (ESP)

==== Final ====
24 May 2015
15:00

Hamburg (Germany)	10–1	(Belgium) Royal Wellington
Altenburg 3'; Hoffmann 4'; Hillmann 7'; Tahal 16', 63'; Mävers 32'; Müller-Wieland 35'; Stapenhorst 37', 60'; Mayen 62'	Report	Sistermans 45'

Umpires:
Vilma Bagdanskiene (LTU)
Ymkje van Slooten (NED)

== Statistics ==
=== Final standings ===
1. (Germany) Hamburg
2. (Belgium) Royal Wellington
3. (Belarus) Minsk
4. (Azerbaijan) Atasport
5. (Spain) Real Sociedad
6. (Ukraine) Sumchanka
7. (Russia) Metrostroy
8. (Ireland) Pembroke Wanderers
