= 2012 EuroHockey Club Champions Cup =

Tournament details
- Dates: 6 April – 27 May
- Teams: 12
- Venue: 3 (in 3 host cities)

Final positions
- Champions: (Netherlands) Laren (1st title)
- Runner-up: (Netherlands) Den Bosch
- Third place: (Germany) Hamburg

Tournament statistics
- Matches played: 20
- Goals scored: 86 (4.3 per match)

The 2012 EuroHockey Club Champions Cup was the 40th edition of the premier European competition for women's field hockey clubs. The finals phase of the competition was held in Amsterdam from May 25–27.

Laren defeated defending champion Den Bosch in the final 1–0. This was their maiden title in the event, and also ended Den Bosch's record 12–year winning streak. Hamburg and Club de Campo also reached the final four, with Hamburg taking the bronze medal with a 3–1 win.

== Venues ==
The tournament was held across three cities, with the group stage and quarter-finals taking place in two separate locations, while the semi-finals and finals culminated at Wagener Stadium, Amsterdam.

2012 EuroHockey Club Champions Cup is located in Europe
(Belgium) Brussels	(Netherlands) Amsterdam	(Spain) San Sebastián
Royal Wellington HC	Wagener Stadium	Real Sociedad

== Teams ==
The following twelve teams contested the 2012 EHCCC:

- (Azerbaijan) Atasport
- (Belarus) Grodno
- (Belgium) Royal Wellington
- (England) Leicester
- (England) Reading
- (Germany) Hamburg
- (Germany) Klipper
- (Netherlands) Den Bosch
- (Netherlands) Laren
- (Russia) Izmaylovo
- (Spain) Club de Campo
- (Spain) Real Sociedad

== Champions Cup ==
=== Results ===
==== Preliminary round ====
===== Pool A =====
Pos	Team	Pld	W	D	L	GF	GA	GD	Pts	Qualification	Netherlands	Spain	Azerbaijan
1	(Netherlands) Den Bosch	2	2	0	0	9	0	+9	6	Quarter-finals	—	4–0	5–0
2	(Spain) Real Sociedad	2	1	0	1	2	4	−2	3	Quarter-finals		—	2–0
3	(Azerbaijan) Atasport	2	0	0	2	0	7	−7	0				—

===== Pool B =====
Pos	Team	Pld	W	D	L	GF	GA	GD	Pts	Qualification	Germany	Russia	England
1	(Germany) Hamburg	2	2	0	0	12	0	+12	6	Quarter-finals	—	6–0	6–0
2	(Russia) Izmaylovo	2	1	0	1	3	8	−5	3	Quarter-finals		—	3–2
3	(England) Leicester	2	0	0	2	2	9	−7	0				—

6 April 2012
12:00

Hamburg (Germany)	6–0	(England) Leicester
Mävers 10'; Korn 23'; Oldhafer 29'; Notman 42'; Hahn 58'; Teschke 66'	Report

Real Sociedad, San Sebastián

7 April 2012
12:00

Izmaylovo (Russia)	0–6	(Germany) Hamburg
	Report	Hahn 32', 46'; Plass 45'; Hillmann 52'; Hoffmann 64'; Mävers 67'

Real Sociedad, San Sebastián

8 April 2012
12:00

Leicester (England)	2–3	(Russia) Izmaylovo

Real Sociedad, San Sebastián

===== Pool C =====
Pos	Team	Pld	W	D	L	GF	GA	GD	Pts	Qualification	Germany	Belgium	England
1	(Germany) Klipper	2	2	0	0	4	1	+3	6	Quarter-finals	—	2–0	2–1
2	(Belgium) Royal Wellington	2	1	0	1	2	2	0	3	Quarter-finals		—	2–0
3	(England) Reading	2	0	0	2	1	4	−3	0				—

Source: EHF

6 April 2012
15:00

Reading (England)	0–2	(Belgium) Royal Wellington
	Report

Royal Wellington HC, Brussels

7 April 2012
13:00

Royal Wellington (Belgium)	0–2	(Germany) Klipper
	Report

Royal Wellington HC, Brussels

8 April 2012
12:30

Klipper (Germany)	2–1	(England) Reading
	Report

Royal Wellington HC, Brussels

===== Pool D =====
Pos	Team	Pld	W	D	L	GF	GA	GD	Pts	Qualification	Netherlands	Spain	Belarus
1	(Netherlands) Laren	2	2	0	0	13	0	+13	6	Quarter-finals	—	6–0	7–0
2	(Spain) Club de Campo	2	1	0	1	3	7	−4	3	Quarter-finals		—	3–1
3	(Belarus) Grodno	2	0	0	2	1	10	−9	0				—

Source: EHF

6 April 2012
12:30

Laren (Netherlands)	7–0	(Belarus) Grodno
	Report

Royal Wellington HC, Brussels

7 April 2012
15:30

Club de Campo (Spain)	0–6	(Netherlands) Laren
	Report

Royal Wellington HC, Brussels

8 April 2012
15:00

Grodno (Belarus)	1–3	(Spain) Club de Campo
	Report

Royal Wellington HC, Brussels

==== Classification round ====
Quarter-finals
(Netherlands) Den Bosch	6
(Russia) Izmaylovo	0
(Germany) Klipper	0
(Spain) Club de Campo	2
(Netherlands) Laren	9
(Belgium) Royal Wellington	0
(Germany) Hamburg	4
(Spain) Real Sociedad	1

Semi-finals
25 May
(Netherlands) Den Bosch	1
(Spain) Club de Campo	0
25 May
(Netherlands) Laren	3 (2)
(Germany) Hamburg	3 (1)

Final
27 May
(Netherlands) Den Bosch	0
(Netherlands) Laren	1
Third place
27 May
(Spain) Club de Campo	1
(Germany) Hamburg	3

===== Quarter-finals =====
9 April 2012

Den Bosch (Netherlands)	6–0	(Russia) Izmaylovo
	Report

Real Sociedad, San Sebastián

9 April 2012

Klipper (Germany)	0–2	(Spain) Club de Campo
	Report

Royal Wellington HC, Brussels

9 April 2012

Laren (Netherlands)	9–0	(Belgium) Royal Wellington
	Report

Royal Wellington HC, Brussels

9 April 2012

Hamburg (Germany)	4–1	(Spain) Real Sociedad
Mävers 3'; Plass 19'; Oldhafer 32'; Hoffmann 51'	Report	Guajardo 37'

Real Sociedad, San Sebastián

===== Semi-finals =====
25 May 2012

Den Bosch (Netherlands)	1–0	(Spain) Club de Campo
	Report

Wagener Stadium, Amsterdam

25 May 2012

Laren (Netherlands)	3–3	(Germany) Hamburg
Müller 20'; Dijkstra 49'; Welten 67'	Report	Mävers 5'; Hoffmann 20'; Müller-Wieland 69'
Penalties
(penalty shoot-out missed) (penalty shoot-out missed); Van As (penalty shoot-out scored); Bos (penalty shoot-out scored) (penalty shoot-out missed)	2–1	(penalty shoot-out missed); (penalty shoot-out scored) Hillmann (penalty shoot-out missed) (penalty shoot-out missed) (penalty shoot-out missed)

Wagener Stadium, Amsterdam

===== Third and fourth place =====
27 May 2012

Club de Campo (Spain)	1–3	(Germany) Hamburg
Piñeiro 29'	Report	Hoffmann 8', 66'; Hahn 68'

Wagener Stadium, Amsterdam

===== Final =====
27 May 2012

Den Bosch (Netherlands)	0–1	(Netherlands) Laren
	Report	Lammers 20'

Wagener Stadium, Amsterdam

== Lower categories ==
=== Champions Trophy (2nd division) ===
#	Team
1	(Ireland) Pegasus
2	(Ukraine) Sumchanka
3	(Belarus) Viktoria Smolevichi
4	(Russia) Metrostroy Saint Petersburg
5	(Scotland) Grove Menzieshill
6	(Belgium) La Gantoise
7	(Italy) Libertas San Saba
8	(Lithuania) Gintra Strekte

=== Challenge I (3rd division) ===
#		
1	(Ireland) Hermes	(Italy) Amicora
3	(France) Lille	(Austria) Wels
5	(Czech Republic) Slavia Prague	(Switzerland) Rot-Weiss Wettingen
7	(Czech Republic) Prague 1946	(Scotland) Dundee Wanderers

=== Challenge II (4th division) ===
#		
1	(France) Stade Français	(Wales) Swansea
3	(Austria) Arminen	(Switzerland) Olten
5	(Wales) Cardiff University	(Azerbaijan) Baku
7	(Bulgaria) NSA Sofia	(Croatia) Zrinjevac
