= 2019 EuroHockey Club Champions Cup =

Tournament details
- Host country: Netherlands
- City: Amstelveen
- Dates: 19–22 April
- Teams: 8
- Venue: Wagener Stadium

Final positions
- Champions: (Netherlands) Amsterdam (14th title)
- Runner-up: (Spain) Real Sociedad
- Third place: (Germany) Club an der Alster

Tournament statistics
- Matches played: 12
- Goals scored: 52 (4.33 per match)
- Top scorer(s): (Germany) Eileen Mävers (Germany) Charlotte Stapenhorst (Netherlands) Frédérique Matla (Netherlands) Marijn Veen (3 goals)

The 2019 EuroHockey Club Champions Cup was the 47th and last edition of the premier European competition for women's field hockey clubs. HC Den Bosch were the defending champions, having won their 16th title in the 2018 EuroHockey Club Champions Cup. The tournament took place from 19 to 22 April 2019 at the Wagener Stadium in Amstelveen, Netherlands. Amsterdam defeated Real Sociedad 7–0 in the final to win the tournament.

== Qualified teams ==
- (Netherlands) Den Bosch
- (Netherlands) Amsterdam
- (Germany) Club an der Alster
- (Germany) UHC Hamburg
- (Spain) Real Sociedad
- (England) Surbiton
- (Belarus) Grodno
- (Ireland) Loreto

== Results ==
=== Bracket ===
Quarter-finals
19 April
(Netherlands) Den Bosch	4
(Ireland) Loreto	0
19 April
(Germany) UHC Hamburg	2
(Netherlands) Amsterdam	3
19 April
(Spain) Real Sociedad	4
(Belarus) Grodno	2
19 April
(England) Surbiton	0
(Germany) Club an der Alster	4

Semi-finals
21 April
(Netherlands) Den Bosch	0
(Netherlands) Amsterdam	1
21 April
(Spain) Real Sociedad	2
(Germany) Club an der Alster	1

Final
22 April
(Netherlands) Amsterdam	7
(Spain) Real Sociedad	0
Third place
22 April
(Netherlands) Den Bosch	1
(Germany) Club an der Alster	2

=== Quarter-finals ===
19 April 2019
12:15

Real Sociedad (Spain)	4–2	(Belarus) Grodno
Altuna 6'; Maraña 7'; Campoy 29', 54'	Report	Vasilyeva 41'; Shyntar 41'

Umpires:
Ymkje van Slooten (NED)
Sophie Bockelmann (GER)

19 April 2019
14:30

Surbiton (England)	0–4	(Germany) Club an der Alster
	Report	Fröschle 24'; Schröder 31'; Wiedermann 49'; Gablać 57'

Umpires:
Magala Sergeant (BEL)
Fanneke Alkemade (NED)

19 April 2019
16:45

Den Bosch (Netherlands)	4–0	(Ireland) Loreto
Matla 4', 25', 31'; Van der Plas 23'	Report

Umpires:
Sandra Wagner (GER)
Sarah Wilson (SCO)

19 April 2019
19:00

UHC Hamburg (Germany)	2–3	(Netherlands) Amsterdam
Evans 21'; Teschke 26'	Report	Vega 43'; Benninga 53', 53'

Umpires:
Rachel Williams (ENG)
Alison Keogh (IRE)

=== Fifth to eighth place classification ===
Crossover
20 April
(Ireland) Loreto	0
(Germany) UHC Hamburg	4
20 April
(Belarus) Grodno	0
(England) Surbiton	7

Fifth place
22 April
(Germany) UHC Hamburg	4
(England) Surbiton	1
Seventh place
22 April
(Ireland) Loreto	2
(Belarus) Grodno	1

==== Crossover ====
20 April 2019
16:45

Grodno (Belarus)	0–7	(England) Surbiton
	Report	Catlin 1'; Woolven 6'; Twigg 9'; Petter 18'; Sanders 34', 60'; Collins 52'

Umpires:
Sandra Wagner (GER)
Alison Keogh (IRE)

20 April 2019
16:45

Loreto (Ireland)	0–4	(Germany) UHC Hamburg
	Report	Stapenhorst 5'; E. Mävers 29', 54'; M. Mävers 36'

Umpires:
Magali Sergeant (BEL)
Rachel Williams (ENG)

==== Seventh place game ====
22 April 2019
09:30

Loreto (Ireland)	2–1	(Belarus) Grodno
Matthews 30'; Torrans 30'	Report	Skurat 4'

Umpires:
Sandra Wagner (GER)
Sophie Bockelmann (GER)

==== Fifth place game ====
22 April 2019
11:45

UHC Hamburg (Germany)	4–1	(England) Surbiton
Stapenhorst 5', 55'; Pluta 22'; E. Mävers 60'	Report	Curtis 51'

Umpires:
Ymkje van Slooten (NED)
Fanneke Alkemade (NED)

=== First to fourth place classification ===
==== Semi-finals ====
21 April 2019
12:00

Den Bosch (Netherlands)	0–1	(Netherlands) Amsterdam
	Report	Vega 5'

Umpires:
Sophie Bockelmann (GER)
Sarah Wilson (ENG)

21 April 2019
14:15

Real Sociedad (Spain)	2–1	(Germany) Club an der Alster
Goena 28'; N. Belzunegui 44'	Report	Valentin 48'

Umpires:
Fanneke Alkemade (NED)
Ymkje van Slooten (NED)

==== Third place game ====
22 April 2019
14:00

Den Bosch (Netherlands)	1–2	(Germany) Club an der Alster
Van den Assem 3'	Report	Horn 30'; Huse 43'

Umpires:
Magali Sergeant (BEL)
Rachel Williams (ENG)

==== Final ====
22 April 2019
16:15

Amsterdam (Netherlands)	7–0	(Spain) Real Sociedad
De Goede 2', 52'; Veen 3', 28', 55'; Jonker 13'; Geerlings 47'	Report

Umpires:
Alison Keogh (IRE)
Sarah Wilson (SCO)

== See also ==
- 2018–19 Euro Hockey League
