= 2016 EuroHockey Club Champions Cup =

EHCCC 2016

Tournament details
- Host country: Netherlands
- City: Bilthoven
- Dates: 13–16 May 2016
- Teams: 8
- Venue: 1

Final positions
- Champions: HC Den Bosch (14th title)
- Runner-up: SCHC
- Third place: Uhlenhorster HC

Tournament statistics
- Matches played: 12
- Goals scored: 59 (4.92 per match)
- Top scorer: Maartje Paumen (6 goals)
- Best player: Jana Teschke

The 2016 EuroHockey Club Champions Cup is the 44th edition of the premier European competition for women's field hockey clubs. For the second year in a row, SCHC organized the championship. The tournament was played in Bilthoven, Netherlands from 13 to 16 May 2016. Eight teams from six countries participated in the tournament.

== Results ==
=== Bracket ===
Quarter-finals
13 May
(Netherlands) Den Bosch | 7
(Russia) Krylatskoye | 0
13 May
(England) Surbiton | 0
(Germany) UHC Hamburg | 6
13 May
(Spain) Club de Campo | 5
(Ireland) Pegasus | 0
13 May
(England) Canterbury | 0
(Netherlands) SCHC | 6

Semi-finals
14 May
(Netherlands) Den Bosch | 5
(Germany) UHC Hamburg | 2
14 May
(Spain) Club de Campo | 0
(Netherlands) SCHC | 1

Final
16 May
(Netherlands) Den Bosch (s.o.) | 1 (3)
(Netherlands) SCHC | 1 (2)
Third place
16 May
(Germany) UHC Hamburg | 3
(Spain) Club de Campo | 2

=== Quarter-finals ===
13 May
13:15

| Surbiton (England) | 0–6 | (Germany) Hamburg |
|---|---|---|
| | Report | Stapenhorst 15+', 18', 27', 30', 47'; Müller-Wieland 60' |

Umpires:
Fanneke Alkemade (NED)
Lisette Baljon (NED)

13 May
15:30

| Club de Campo (Spain) | 5–0 | (Ireland) Pegasus |
|---|---|---|
| Magaz 2'; Cano 18', 25'; López 52'; Mowinkel 55' | Report |

Umpires:
Hannah Sanders (ENG)
Elena Eskina (RUS)

13 May
17:45

| Den Bosch (Netherlands) | 7–0 | (Russia) Krylatskoye |
|---|---|---|
| Paumen 3', 20'; Vorstenbosch 15'; Keetels 43'; Van Geffen 47'; Verbruggen 57'; Van den Assem 58' | Report |

Umpires:
Laurine Delforge (BEL)
Alison Keogh (IRL)

13 May
20:00

| Canterbury (England) | 0–6 | (Netherlands) SCHC |
|---|---|---|
| | Report | Van Maasakker 4', 38'; Zerbo 9', 12'; Verhage 33'; De Waard 59' |

Umpires:
Sarah Wilson (SCO)
Karine Alves Pereira (FRA)

=== Fifth to eighth place classification ===
==== Crossover ====
15 May
10:45

| Krylatskoye (Russia) | 2–4 | (England) Surbiton |
|---|---|---|
| Sadovaia 28', 52' | Report | Woolven 3'; Evans 18', 48'; Coulson 20' |

Umpires:
Fanneke Alkemade (NED)
Alison Keogh (IRL)

15 May
13:00

| Pegasus (Ireland) | 0–3 | (England) Canterbury HC |
|---|---|---|
| | Report | Chamberlain 22', 56'; Clewlow 40' |

Umpires:
Lisette Baljon (NED)
Karine Alves Pereira (FRA)

==== Seventh and eighth place ====
16 May
09:00

| Krylatskoye (Russia) | 4–2 | (Ireland) Pegasus |
|---|---|---|
| Drepenkina 30'; Sadovaia 37', 42'; Sartakova 42' | Report | Quinn 14'; Grieve 59' |

Umpires:
Hannah Sanders (ENG)
Lisette Baljon (NED)

==== Fifth and sixth place ====
16 May
11:15

| Surbiton (England) | 2–3 | (England) Canterbury |
|---|---|---|
| Twigg 4'; Evans 38' | Report | Clewlow 30'; Wilson 50', 52' |

Umpires:
Karine Alves Pereira (FRA)
Alison Keogh (IRL)

=== First to fourth place classification ===
==== Semi-finals ====
14 May
14:00

| Den Bosch (Netherlands) | 5–2 | (Germany) Hamburg |
|---|---|---|
| Paumen 12', 16', 21'; Welten 41', 48' | Report | Müller 6'; Korn 40' |

Umpires:
Sarah Wilson (SCO)
Elena Eskina (RUS)

14 May
16:15

| Club de Campo (Spain) | 0–1 | (Netherlands) SCHC |
|---|---|---|
| | Report | De Waard 37' |

Umpires:
Hannah Sanders (ENG)
Laurine Delforge (BEL)

==== Third place ====
16 May
13:30

| Hamburg (Germany) | 3–2 | (Spain) Club de Campo |
|---|---|---|
| Otte 7'; Teschke 17'; Steikowsky 28' | Report | Pessina 10'; Magaz 36' |

Umpires:
Fanneke Alkemade (NED)
Elena Eskina (RUS)

==== Final ====
16 May
15:45

| Den Bosch (Netherlands) | 1–1 | (Netherlands) SCHC |
|---|---|---|
| Paumen 24' | Report | Van Maasakker 40' |
Penalties
| Vorstenbosch (penalty shoot-out scored); Hulsen (penalty shoot-out scored); Matla (penalty shoot-out scored); Jansen (penalty shoot-out missed) | 3–2 | (penalty shoot-out scored) Stöckel; (penalty shoot-out scored) Dirkse van den Heuvel; (penalty shoot-out missed) Drost; (penalty shoot-out missed) Jaspers, (penalty shoot-out missed) Van Maasakker; (penalty shoot-out missed) Verhage |

Umpires:
Sarah Wilson (SCO)
Laurine Delforge (BEL)

Notes

1. Den Bosch goalkeeper fouled Jaspers during shoot-out. Referee awarded a penalty stroke. Caia van Maasakker missed the penalty.

== Statistics ==
=== Awards ===
| Player of the Tournament | Top Goalscorer | Goalkeeper of the Tournament |
|---|---|---|
| (Germany) Jana Teschke (Hamburg) | (Netherlands) Maartje Paumen (Den Bosch) | (Russia) Anna Shichkina (Krylatskoye) |

=== Final ranking ===
1. (Netherlands) Den Bosch
2. (Netherlands) SCHC
3. (Germany) Hamburg
4. (Spain) Club de Campo
5. (England) Canterbury
6. (England) Surbiton
7. (Russia) Krylatskoye
8. (Ireland) Pegasus
