= Women's EuroHockey Club Champions Cup =

EuroHockey Club Champions Cup
- Most recent season or competition: 2019 EuroHockey Club Champions Cup
- Sport: Field hockey
- Founded: 1974
- Folded: 2019
- Replaced by: Euro Hockey League
- No. of teams: 8
- Confederation: EHF (Europe)
- Last champion: (Netherlands) Amsterdam (14th title) (2019)
- Most titles: (Netherlands) Den Bosch (16 titles)

The EuroHockey Club Champions Cup, previously known as the European Club Championship, was the leading woman's field hockey competition for clubs in Europe. The competition was first contested in 1974, and played out its last edition in 2019.

The competition has been replaced by the Women's Euro Hockey League.

== Results ==
Season	Host	Final			Third place game		
Season	Host	Winner	Score	Runner-up	Third place	Score	Fourth place
1974	Hamburg, West Germany	(West Germany); Harvestehude	1–0	(Belgium); Uccle	(France); Stade Français	2–1	(Netherlands); De Kieviten
1975	Brussels, Belgium	(Netherlands); Amsterdam	1–0	(West Germany); Eintracht Braunschweig	(Belgium); Uccle	2–1	(West Germany); Harvestehude
1976	Amstelveen, Netherlands	(Netherlands); Amsterdam	3–1	(West Germany); Eintracht Braunschweig	(Czechoslovakia); Slavia Prague	3–1	(Belgium); Uccle
1977	Vienna, Austria	(Netherlands); Amsterdam	3–0	(West Germany); Eintracht Braunschweig	(Belgium); Uccle	3–1	(Czechoslovakia); Slavia Prague
1978	Barcelona, Spain	(Netherlands); Amsterdam	1–0	(West Germany); Großflottbek	(Netherlands); Were Di	2–1	(Belgium); Uccle
1979	The Hague, Netherlands	(Netherlands); Amsterdam	3–1	(Belgium); Uccle	(Scotland); Glasgow Western	1–1	(Netherlands); Were Di
1980	Barcelona, Spain	(Netherlands); Amsterdam	1–0 (a.e.t.)	(Scotland); Glasgow Western	(Ireland); Muckcross	1–0	(West Germany); Großflottbek
1981	Brussels, Belgium	(Netherlands); Amsterdam	2–1	(Scotland); Glasgow Western	(West Germany); Blau-Weiss Köln	2–1	(Ireland); Portadown
1982	Alba, Italy	(Netherlands); Amsterdam	1–0	(West Germany); 1. Hanauer THC	(Soviet Union); Spartak Moscow	1–1 (a.e.t.)	(Ireland); Pegasus
1983	The Hague, Netherlands	(Netherlands); HGC	2–0	(West Germany); Bayer Leverkusen	(Netherlands); Amsterdam	3–2	(Soviet Union); SKIF Moscow
1984	Wassenaar, The Hague	(Netherlands); HGC	3–1	(Soviet Union); Kolos Borispol	(Netherlands); Amsterdam	3–0	(West Germany); Bayer Leverkusen
1985	Frankenthal, West Germany	(Netherlands); HGC	1–1 (a.e.t.) (13–12 p.s.)	(Soviet Union); SKIF Moscow	(Netherlands); Amsterdam	4–2	(West Germany); 1. Hanauer THC
1986	Utrecht, Netherlands	(Netherlands); HGC	3–1	(Soviet Union); Kolos Borispol	(West Germany); Bayer Leverkusen	4–1	(Scotland); Glasgow Western
1987	Wassenaar, Netherlands	(Netherlands); HGC	1–0	(West Germany); Blau-Weiss Köln	(Soviet Union); Andizhanka Andizhan	2–1	(England); Slough
1988	Bloemendaal, Netherlands	(Netherlands); Amsterdam	4–0	(Soviet Union); Kolos Borispol	(Scotland); Glasgow Western	5–4	(Netherlands); HGC
1989	Wassenaar, Netherlands	(Netherlands); Amsterdam	3–2	(Scotland); Glasgow Western	(Netherlands); HGC	1–0	(West Germany); 1880 Frankfurt
1990	Frankfurt, West Germany	(Netherlands); Amsterdam	4–0	(Scotland); Glasgow Western	(Soviet Union); Kolos Borispol	3–2	(Spain); Club de Campo
1991	Wassenaar, Netherlands	(Netherlands); HGC	2–1	(Scotland); Glasgow Western	(Netherlands); Amsterdam	1–0	(Spain); Club de Campo
1992	Amstelveen, Netherlands	(Netherlands); Amsterdam	4–0	(Scotland); Glasgow Western	(Netherlands); HGC	6–0	(Germany); Eintracht Frankfurt
1993	Brussels, Belgium	(Germany); Rüsselsheimer RK	1–1 (a.e.t.) (p.s.)	(Netherlands); Amsterdam	(England); Slough	1–1(a.e.t.) (p.s.)	(Scotland); Glasgow Western
1994	Bloemendaal, Netherlands	(Netherlands); HGC		(Germany); Rüsselsheimer RK	(England); Ipswich		(Scotland); Glasgow Western
1995	Utrecht, Netherlands	(Netherlands); Kampong		(Germany); Berliner HC	(Lithuania); Siauliai		(Scotland); Glasgow Western
1996	Rüsselsheim am Main, Germany	(Netherlands); Kampong		(England); Slough	(Germany); Rüsselsheimer RK		(Scotland); Glasgow Western
1997	Amstelveen, Netherlands	(Germany); Berliner HC	2–1	(Netherlands); HGC	(England); Hightown	5–3	(Scotland); Glasgow Western
1998	Slough, England	(Germany); Rüsselsheimer RK	3–2	(England); Slough	(Netherlands); HGC	4–1	(Scotland); Edinburgh
1999	's-Hertogenbosch, Netherlands	(Germany); Rot-Weiss Köln	2–2 (a.e.t.) (3–1 p.s.)	(Netherlands); Den Bosch	(England); Slough	2–0	(Scotland); Edinburgh
2000	Glasgow, Scotland	(Netherlands); Den Bosch	7–0	(Germany); Berliner HC	(Ukraine); Kolos Borispol	2–1	(Scotland); Glasgow Western
2001	's-Hertogenbosch, Netherlands	(Netherlands); Den Bosch	6–0	(Russia); Moscow Pravda	(Ukraine); Kolos Borispol	2–1	(Spain); CD Terrassa
2002	Terrassa, Spain	(Netherlands); Den Bosch	5–0	(Ukraine); Kolos Borispol	(England); Slough	2–0	(Lithuania); Siauliai Ginstrekte
2003	's-Hertogenbosch, Netherlands	(Netherlands); Den Bosch	7–2	(England); Olton & West Warwick	(Ukraine); Kolos Borispol	3–2	(Germany); Klipper THC
2004	Barcelona, Spain	(Netherlands); Den Bosch	8–2	(Ukraine); Kolos Borispol	(Germany); Rot-Weiss Köln	5–3	(England); Slough
2005	's-Hertogenbosch, Netherlands	(Netherlands); Den Bosch	8–1	(Azerbaijan); Atasport	(England); Hightown	2–2 (a.e.t.) (5–4 p.s.)	(Germany); Rüsselsheimer RK
2006	Berlin, Germany	(Netherlands); Den Bosch	4–0	(England); Canterbury	(Germany); Berliner HC	3–3 (a.e.t.) (6–4 p.s.)	(Azerbaijan); Atasport
2007	Baku, Azerbaijan	(Netherlands); Den Bosch	2–1	(England); Leicester	(Germany); Berliner HC	2–2 (a.e.t.) (4–2 p.s.)	(Azerbaijan); Atasport
2008	Cologne, Germany	(Netherlands); Den Bosch	7–0	(Spain); Club de Campo	(Germany); Rot-Weiss Köln	2–1	(Azerbaijan); Atasport
2009	Den Bosch, Netherlands	(Netherlands); Den Bosch	9–1	(Germany); Berliner HC	(Azerbaijan); Atasport	1–1	(Spain); CD Terrassa
2010; Details	Amstelveen, Netherlands	(Netherlands); Den Bosch	3–0	(Germany); UHC Hamburg	(Netherlands); Amsterdam	4–1	(Azerbaijan); Atasport
2011; Details	Wassenaar, Netherlands	(Netherlands); Den Bosch	4–1	(England); Leicester	(Netherlands); Laren	2–1 (a.e.t.)	(England); Slough
2012; Details	Amstelveen, Netherlands	(Netherlands); Laren	1–0	(Netherlands); Den Bosch	(Germany); UHC Hamburg	3–1	(Spain); Club de Campo
2013; Details	Bloemendaal, Netherlands	(Netherlands); Den Bosch	4–2	(Netherlands); Laren	(Germany) Rot-Weiss Köln and (Germany) UHC Hamburg		
2014; Details	's-Hertogenbosch, Netherlands	(Netherlands); Amsterdam	2–2 (3–0 s.o.)	(Netherlands); Den Bosch	(Germany); UHC Hamburg	1–1 (4–2 s.o.)	(Spain); Club de Campo
2015; Details	Bilthoven, Netherlands	(Netherlands); SCHC	2–2 (3–2 s.o.)	(Netherlands); Den Bosch	(Spain); Club de Campo	4–0	(Germany); Rot-Weiss Köln
2016; Details	Bilthoven, Netherlands	(Netherlands); Den Bosch	1–1	(Netherlands); SCHC	(Germany); UHC Hamburg	3–2	(Spain); Club de Campo
2017; Details	's-Hertogenbosch, Netherlands	(Netherlands); Den Bosch	2–1	(Germany); UHC Hamburg	(Netherlands); Amsterdam	3–1	(England); Surbiton
2018; Details	London, England	(Netherlands); Den Bosch	2–1	(Germany); UHC Hamburg	(Spain); Club de Campo	2–1	(Netherlands); Amsterdam
2019; Details	Amstelveen, Netherlands	(Netherlands); Amsterdam	7–0	(Spain); Real Sociedad	(Germany); Club an der Alster	2–1	(Netherlands); Den Bosch

== Records and statistics ==
=== Performances by club ===
Medal table by club
Rank	Club	Gold	Silver	Bronze	Total
1	(Netherlands) Den Bosch	16	4	0	20
2	(Netherlands) Amsterdam	14	1	6	21
3	(Netherlands) HGC	7	1	3	11
4	(Germany) Rüsselsheimer RK	2	1	1	4
5	(Netherlands) Kampong	2	0	0	2
6	(Germany) Berliner HC	1	3	2	6
7	(Netherlands) Laren	1	1	1	3
8	(Netherlands) SCHC	1	1	0	2
9	(Germany) Rot-Weiss Köln	1	0	3	4
10	(Germany) Harvestehude	1	0	0	1
11	(Scotland) Glasgow Western	0	6	2	8
12	(Ukraine) Kolos Borispol	0	5	4	9
13	(Germany) UHC Hamburg	0	3	4	7
14	(Germany) Eintracht Braunschweig	0	3	0	3
15	(England) Slough	0	2	3	5
16	(Belgium) Uccle	0	2	2	4
17	(England) Leicester	0	2	0	2
18	(Spain) Club de Campo	0	1	2	3
19	(Azerbaijan) Atasport	0	1	1	2
19	(Germany) Bayer Leverkusen	0	1	1	2
21–38	Remaining	0	8	12	20
Totals (38 entries)		46	46	47	139

=== Performances by nation ===
Medal table by nation
Rank	Nation	Gold	Silver	Bronze	Total
1	Netherlands (NED)	41	8	11	60
2	Germany (GER)	5	14	13	32
3	England (ENG)	0	6	6	12
4	Scotland (SCO)	0	6	2	8
5	Soviet Union (URS)	0	4	3	7
6	Ukraine (UKR)	0	2	3	5
7	Belgium (BEL)	0	2	2	4
7	Spain (ESP)	0	2	2	4
9	Azerbaijan (AZE)	0	1	1	2
10	Russia (RUS)	0	1	0	1
11	Czechoslovakia (TCH)	0	0	1	1
11	France (FRA)	0	0	1	1
11	Ireland	0	0	1	1
11	Lithuania (LTU)	0	0	1	1
Totals (14 entries)		46	46	47	139

== See also ==
- EuroHockey Club Champions Cup
- Women's Euro Hockey League
- Women's EuroHockey Indoor Club Cup
