= Ollie Payne =

England field hockey player (born 1999)

Personal information
- Full name: Oliver John Payne
- Born: 6 April 1999 (age 27) Totnes, England
- Height: 1.62 m (5 ft 4 in)

Sport
- Sport: Field hockey
- Position: Goalkeeper
Senior career
Years	Team	Caps	Goals
–2017	Dart Hockey Club	-	-
2017–2020	Durham University	-	-
2020–2025	Holcombe	-	-
2025–2026	Amsterdam	-	-
National team
Years	Team	Caps	Goals
2017–2019	England & GB U21	26	(0)
2020–present	England & GB	81	(0)
Medal record
Men's field hockey
Representing England
EuroHockey Championship
Silver medal – second place	2023 Mönchengladbach
Commonwealth Games
Bronze medal – third place	2022 Birmingham	Team
EuroHockey Junior Championship
Silver medal – second place	2019 Valencia

Oliver John Payne (born 6 April 1999) is an English field hockey player who plays as a goalkeeper for Dutch Hoofdklasse club Amsterdam and the England and Great Britain national teams.

He competed at the 2020 Summer Olympics and 2024 Summer Olympics.

== Club career ==
Payne began playing hockey for Dart Hockey Club before studying Sports and Exercise Science at Durham University. After Durham he joined Holcombe in the Men's England Hockey League Premier Division for the 2020 season. In 2024 he signed for Dutch Hoofdklasse side Amsterdam to join from the 2025–26 season.

== International career ==
While at Durham, Payne was capped for the Great Britain U21 team and was the goalkeeper of the tournament at the 2019 Sultan of Johor Cup. He was selected to represent Great Britain for the delayed 2020 Olympic Games in Tokyo and on 28 May 2021, he was selected as the first choice goalkeeper in the England squad for the 2021 EuroHockey Championship and won a bronze medal with England in the Men's tournament at the 2022 Commonwealth Games in Birmingham. He then won a silver medal with England at the 2023 Men's EuroHockey Championship in Mönchengladbach.

He was selected to represent Great Britain at the 2024 Summer Olympics. The team went out in the quarter-finals after losing a penalty shootout to India.

He joined Dutch club Amsterdam for the 2025–26 season.
