= Louise Baxter =

Scottish field hockey player

Louise Baxter (née Munn, born 30 September 1983) is a Scottish field hockey defender, who also plays in midfield. She has made 114 appearances for the Women's National Team.

She was born 8 in Newport-on-Tay, attending Bell Baxter High School in Cupar, Fife. She made her debut for the Women's National Team in 2003. She played in two Commonwealth Games tournaments: Melbourne and Dehli. She retired from international competitions in 2011 after deciding to concentrate on her career in physical education. She has played club hockey for Bell Baxter FP, Dunfermline Ladies, Grange Edinburgh, Bonagrass Grove and Grove Menzieshill.

Baxter taught physical education at St George's School in Edinburgh before becoming Head of Physical Education at Kilgraston School, Perthshire in 2010. She later moved to the High School of Dundee, where she taught physical education and also held a guidance role.
