= Nienke Kremers =

Dutch field hockey player

Medal record

Women's field hockey

Representing the Netherlands

Champions Trophy
Gold medal – first place	2007 Quilmes	Team competition

Nienke Kremers (pronounced [ˈniŋkə ˈkreːmərs]; born 21 February 1985 in Eindhoven, North Brabant) is a Dutch field hockey player, who plays as a midfielder for Dutch club HC Den Bosch. She also plays for the Netherlands national team and she was part of the Dutch squad that became 2007 Champions Trophy winner.
