= Montse Cruz =

Spanish field hockey player (born 1979)

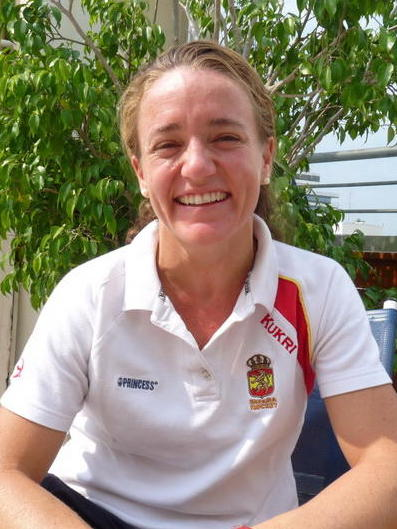
Montse Cruz in 2011.

Montse Cruz (born 4 October 1979) is a Spanish field hockey player who competed in the 2008 Summer Olympics.
