= HC 's-Hertogenbosch =

Dutch hockey team

Den Bosch
- Full name: Hockeyclub 's-Hertogenbosch
- Nickname(s): Zwarthemden
- League: Men's Hoofdklasse; Women's Hoofdklasse
- Founded: 14 July 1937; 89 years ago
- Home ground: Complex Oosterplas, 's-Hertogenbosch (Capacity 2,000)
- Website: Club website
Home	Away

Hockeyclub 's-Hertogenbosch, also known as Den Bosch, is a Dutch professional field hockey club based in 's-Hertogenbosch, North Brabant. It was founded on 14 July 1937.

The first teams (men and women) both compete on the highest level of the Dutch field hockey league, the Hoofdklasse. HC 's-Hertogenbosch won the title in 1998 and 2001. The women's team reign since 1998, winning a record number of nineteen titles in 21 years since then.

== Stadium ==
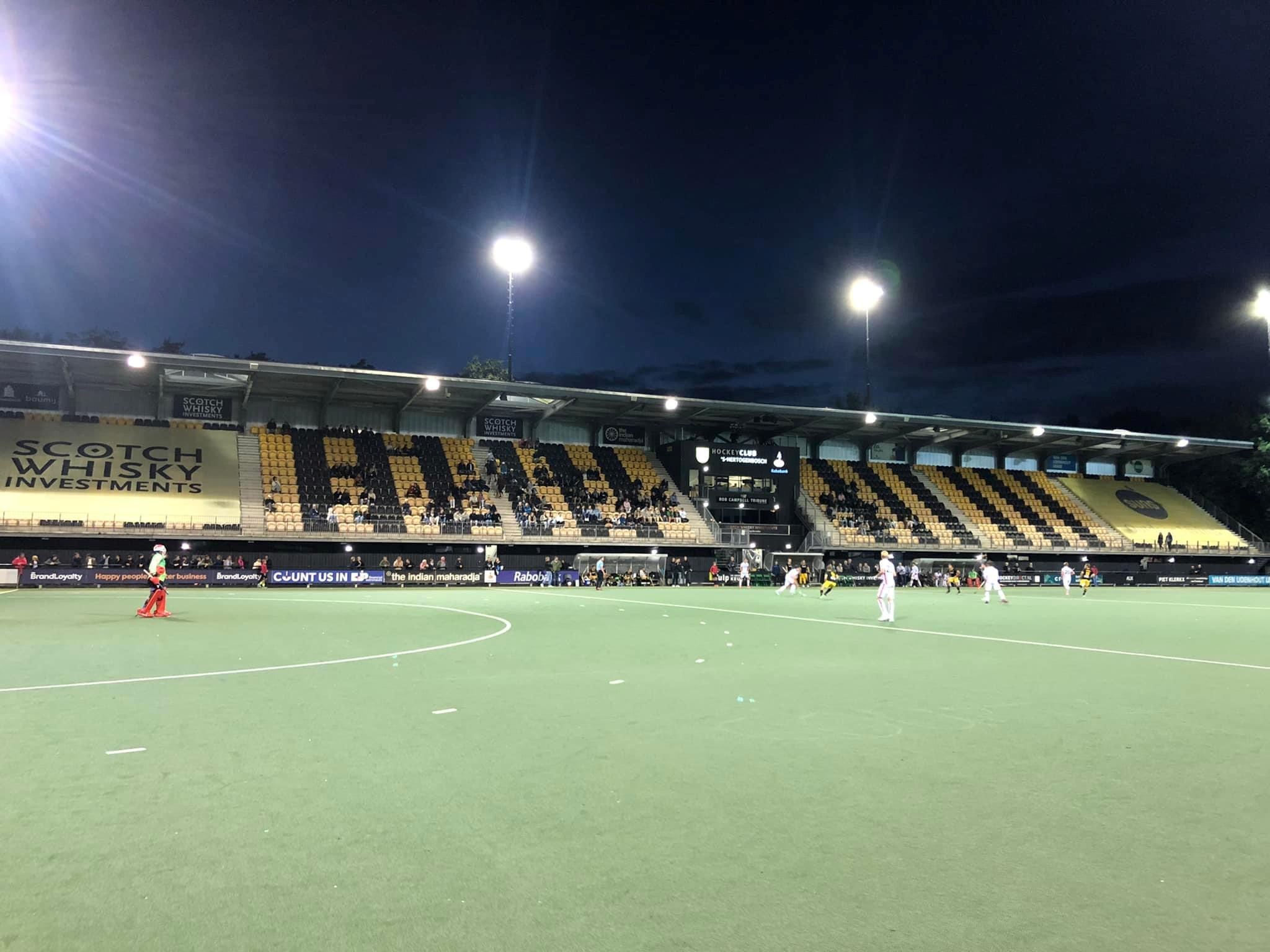
HC 's-Hertogenbosch Stadium

The club plays at a purpose built facility near the lake Oosterplas.

== Honours ==
=== Men ===
Hoofdklasse

- Winners (2): 1997–98, 2000–01
- Runners-up (2): 1996–97, 1999–2000

Gold Cup

- Winners (3): 2022–23, 2024–25, 2025–26
- Runners-up (1): 2017–18

EuroHockey Club Champions Cup

- Winners (1): 1999
- Runners-up (1): 2002

EuroHockey Cup Winners' Cup

- Winners (2): 1998, 2001

Hoofdklasse Indoor

- Winners (1): 1969–70

=== Women ===
Hoofdklasse

- Winners (23): 1997–98, 1998–99, 1999–2000, 2000–01, 2001–02, 2002–03, 2003–04, 2004–05, 2005–06, 2006–07, 2007–08, 2009–10, 2010–11, 2011–12, 2013–14, 2014–15, 2015–16, 2016–17, 2017–18, 2020–21, 2021–22, 2023–24, 2024–25
- Runners-up (3): 2008–09, 2012–13, 2018–19

Euro Hockey League

- Winners (3): 2021, 2023, 2025
- Runners-up (1): 2022

Gold Cup

- Winners (2): 2021–22, 2024–25
- Runners-up (1): 2022–23

EuroHockey Club Cup

- Winners (16): 2000, 2001, 2002, 2003, 2004, 2005, 2006, 2007, 2008, 2009, 2010, 2011, 2013, 2016, 2017, 2018
- Runners-up (4): 1999, 2012, 2014, 2015

Hoofdklasse Indoor

- Winners (9): 1969–70, 1970–71, 1972–73, 1973–74, 1991–92, 2001–02, 2011–12, 2013–14, 2021–22

EuroHockey Indoor Club Cup

- Winners (1): 2013

== Players ==
=== Current squad ===
==== Men's squad ====
As of 13 September 2024

No.	Pos.	Nation	Player
1	GK	GER	Alexander Stadler
2	DF	NED	Imre Vos
3		NED	Mees Kurvers
4		ENG	Sam Spencer
5	DF	NED	Joep Burgerhof
6		NED	Max Pastoor
7	FW	NED	Jaïr van der Horst
8	FW	NED	Thierry Brinkman
9	FW	NED	Pepijn Reijenga
10	MF	NED	Gijs Campbell
11	FW	NED	Max Kreft

No.	Pos.	Nation	Player
12	DF	NED	Timo Boers
14	DF	NED	Tijn van Groesen
17	DF	ESP	Marc Vizcaino
18	DF	NED	Jasper Tukkers (Captain)
22	FW	NED	Koen Bijen
23	MF	AUT	Fabian Unterkircher
24		NED	Lucas Driessen
29	MF	ENG	Tom Sorsby
32	GK	NED	Sander van Berkel
33	MF	NED	Joppe Wolbert
46		NED	Melle van Tilburg

==== Women's Squad ====
Head coach: Marieke Dijkstra

As of 2 September 2022

No.	Pos.	Nation	Player
1	GK	NED	Josine Koning
2	GK	NED	Liselot van Bergen
3	DF	NED	Rosa Fernig
4	MF	NED	Pleun van der Plas
5	DF	NED	Danique van der Veerdonk
6	DF	NED	Amber Brouwer
8	MF	NED	Teuntje de Wit
10	FW	NED	Noor Omrani
11	DF	NED	Pien Sanders (Captain)
12	DF	NED	Emmeliene Oonk

No.	Pos.	Nation	Player
13	FW	AUS	Brooke Peris
14	DF	NED	Sanne Koolen
15	FW	NED	Frédérique Matla
16	FW	NED	Joosje Burg
17	FW	NED	Sian Keil
19	MF	NED	Emma Reijnen
20	MF	NED	Laura Nunnink
21	FW	NED	Imme van der Hoek
22	MF	NED	Maartje Krekelaar
24	GK	FRA	Lucie Ehrmann

=== Notable players ===
==== Men's internationals ====
Netherlands

- Matthijs Brouwer
- Jeroen Delmee
- Rob Derikx
- Piet-Hein Geeris
- Ronald Jansen
- Robbert Kemperman
- Marc Lammers
- Bob de Voogd
- Sander van der Weide

Argentina

- Nicolás Della Torre
- Pedro Ibarra
- Joaquín Menini
- Lucas Vila

Australia

- Kieran Govers
- Dylan Wotherspoon

Belgium

- Sébastien Dockier
- Loic Van Doren

Great Britain/England

- Mark Gleghorne

Ireland

- Michael Darling
- Mark Gleghorne
- Alan Sothern

New Zealand

- Hayden Shaw

Spain

- Francisco Cortés Juncosa
- Rodrigo Garza

Canada

- Ranjeev Deol

South Africa

- Austin Smith

==== Women's internationals ====
Netherlands

- Ireen van den Assem
- Dillianne van den Boogaard
- Minke Booij
- Ageeth Boomgaardt
- Frederique Derkx
- Mijntje Donners
- Miek van Geenhuizen
- Danique van der Veerdonk
- Margot van Geffen
- Maartje Goderie
- Yibbi Jansen
- Marloes Keetels
- Sanne Koolen
- Josine Koning
- Maartje Krekelaar
- Nienke Kremers
- Frédérique Matla
- Maartje Paumen
- Pien Sanders
- Jacqueline Toxopeus
- Lidewij Welten

Great Britain/England

- Helen Richardson-Walsh

India

- Subhadra Pradhan
