= Anke Brockmann =

German field hockey player

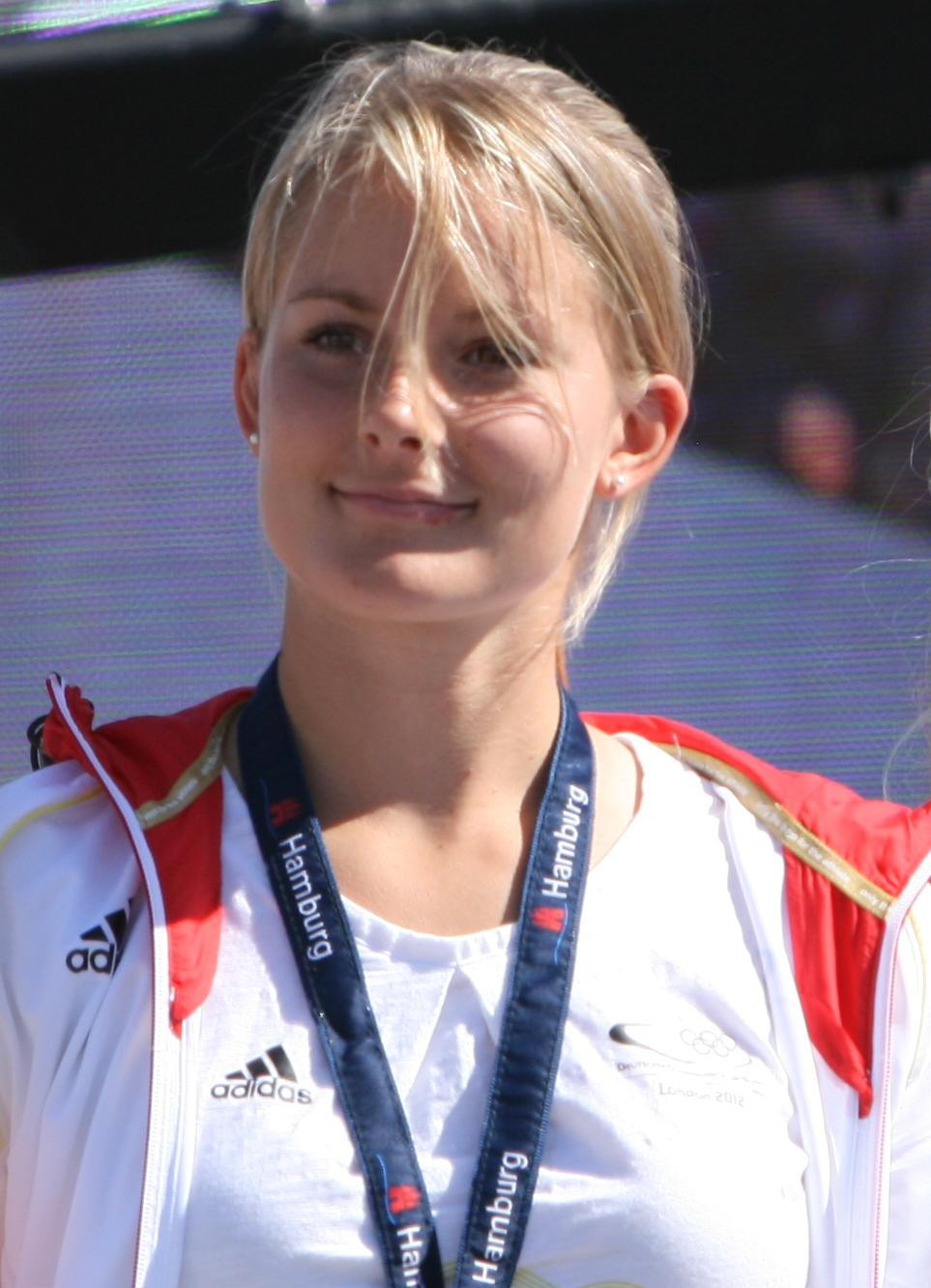

Anke Brockmann (born 19 August 1988 in Berlin) is a German field hockey player. At the 2012 Summer Olympics, she competed for the Germany women's national field hockey team in the women's event.
