= Maartje Krekelaar =

Dutch field hockey player

Personal information
- Born: 6 July 1995 (age 31) Veghel, Netherlands
- Height: 171 cm (5 ft 7 in)

Sport
- Sport: Field hockey
- Position: Midfielder
- Club: Den Bosch
National team
Years	Team	Caps	Goals
2015–	Netherlands	43	(11)
Medal record
Women's field hockey
Representing Netherlands
FIH Hockey World League
Gold medal – first place	2016-17 Auckland	Team
Junior World Cup
Silver medal – second place	2016 Santiago	Team
Champions Trophy
Gold medal – first place	2018 Changzhou	Team

Maartje Krekelaar (born 6 July 1995) is a Dutch field hockey player.

Maartje Krekelaar (Veghel, July 6, 1995) is a Dutch hockey player. To date, Krekelaar played 43 international matches (11 goals) for the national women's team (reference date 1 August 2019) [1]. She won with Hockey Club 's-Hertogenbosch six times the national title in the period 2011-2019 (in 2013 and 2019 silver). Previously she played at Hockeyclub Uden. Krekelaar is playing as a midfielder for Hockey Club 's-Hertogenbosch since 2007.

Krekelaar was part of the Netherlands Junior National Team at the 2016 Junior World Cup where the team finished second, losing to Argentina in the final.

For the Dutch, Krekelaar made her debut during the 2015 Hockey World League final in Rosario (Argentina). In the first group match against Germany, Krekelaar scored the 0-1 for the Netherlands.

Krekelaar played the Woman's Hockey World League Final 2017, in Auckland (NZL), and won with the national women's teamgold and became top scorer of the tournament with 5 field goals.

Krekelaar is one of the ambassadors for Roparun and Foundation Pole Position
