= Kitty van Male =

Dutch field hockey player (born 1988)

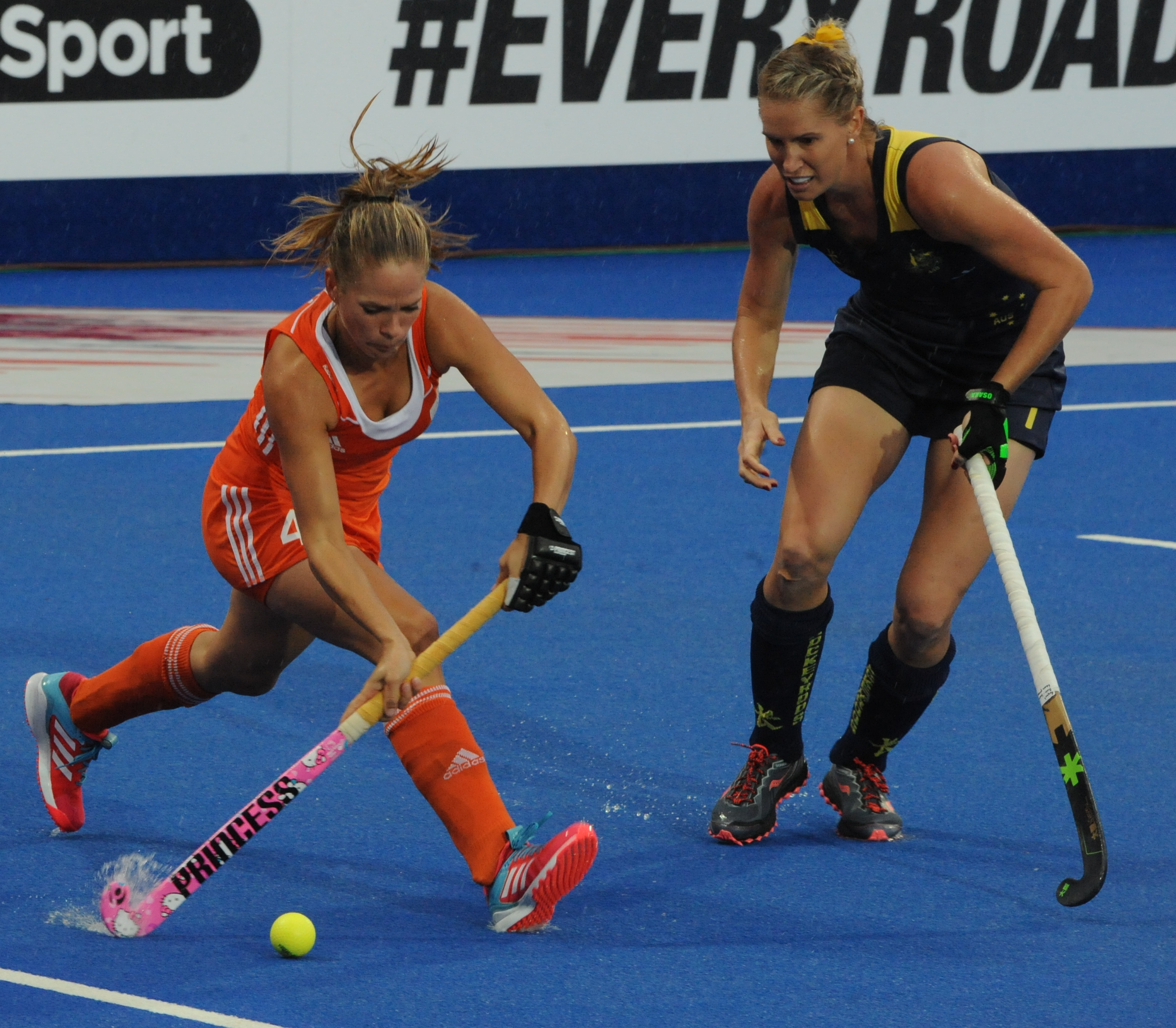
- Kitty van Male (left) at the 2016 Women's Hockey Champions Trophy

Personal information
- Born: 5 June 1988 (age 38) Amstelveen, Netherlands
- Height: 1.70 m (5 ft 7 in)
- Weight: 63 kg (139 lb)

Sport
- Sport: Field hockey
- Position: Forward
National team
Years	Team	Caps	Goals
–	Netherlands	116	(39)
Medal record
Olympic Games
Gold medal – first place	2012 London	Team
Silver medal – second place	2016 Rio de Janeiro	Team
World Cup
Gold medal – first place	2018 London
European Championship
Gold medal – first place	2017 Amstelveen
Bronze medal – third place	2013 Boom
FIH World League
Gold medal – first place	2012–13 Tucumán	Final
Champions Trophy
Silver medal – second place	2016 London
Bronze medal – third place	2012 Rosario

Kitty van Male (born 5 June 1988) is a Dutch field hockey player.

At the 2012 Summer Olympics, she competed for the Netherlands women's national field hockey team in the women's event, where the Netherlands won gold. At club level she plays for AH&BC.
