= Katie Long =

English field hockey player

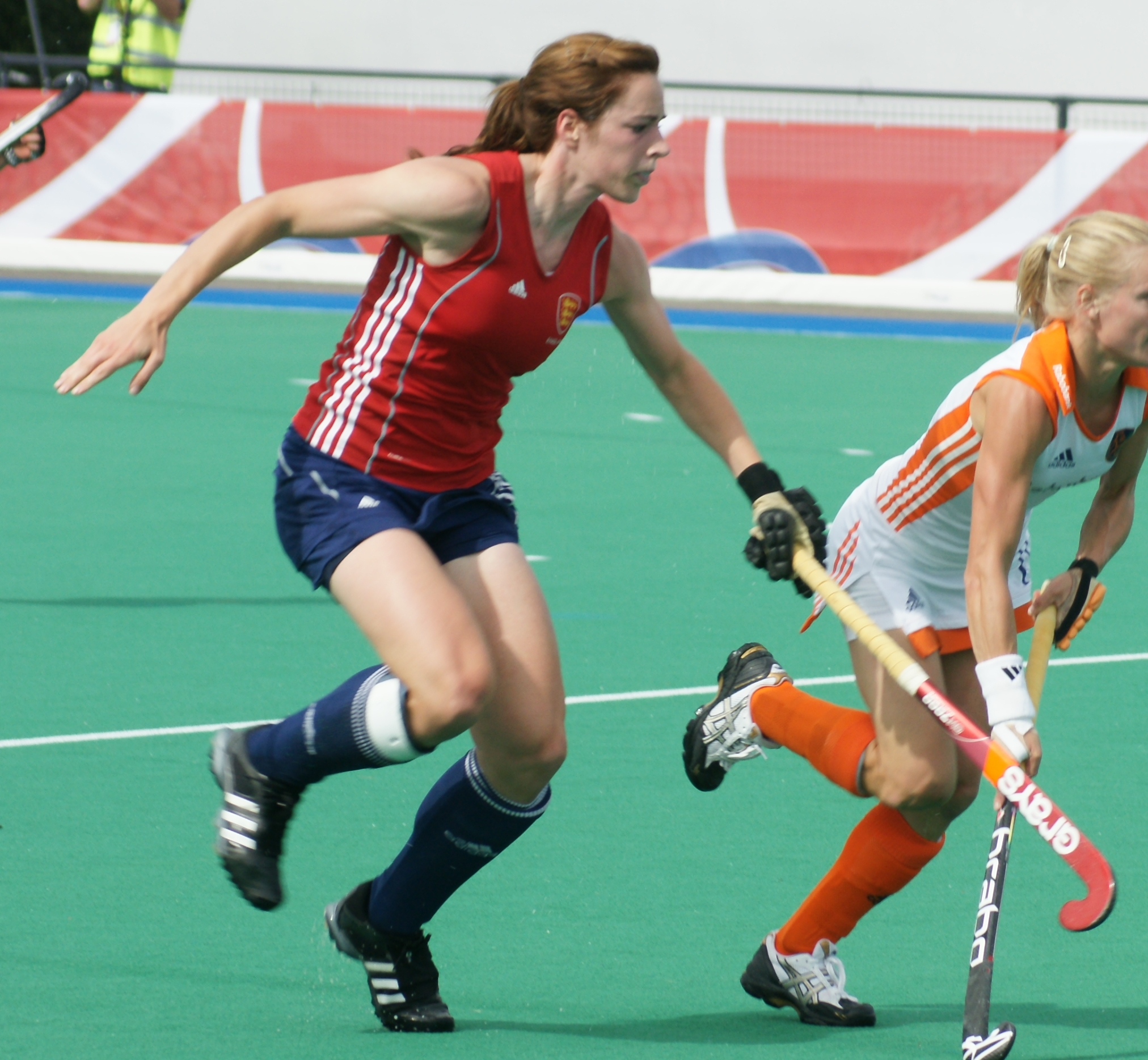
Katie Long

Katie Long (born 13 May 1988) is a field hockey forward player from England.
