= Ireen van den Assem =

Dutch field hockey player

Personal information
- Born: 9 February 1990 (age 36)
- Height: 1.77 m (5 ft 10 in)

Sport
- Sport: Field hockey
- Position: Defender
- Club: Den Bosch
National team
Years	Team	Caps	Goals
2013-present	Netherlands	79	(13)
Medal record
World Cup
Gold medal – first place	2018 London
European Championship
Gold medal – first place	2019 Antwerp
- Updated on 23 June 2021

Ireen Maria Regine van den Assem (born 9 February 1990) is a Dutch field hockey player who plays as a defender for Den Bosch and the Dutch national team.

She participated in the 2018 Women's Hockey World Cup.
