= Amsterdamsche Hockey & Bandy Club =

Field hockey club in the Netherlands

Amsterdam
- Full name: Amsterdamsche Hockey & Bandy Club
- Short name: AH&BC
- League: Men's Hoofdklasse; Women's Hoofdklasse
- Founded: 18 January 1892; 134 years ago
- Home ground: Wagener Stadium, Amstelveen (Capacity 7,600)
- Website: Club website
Home	Away

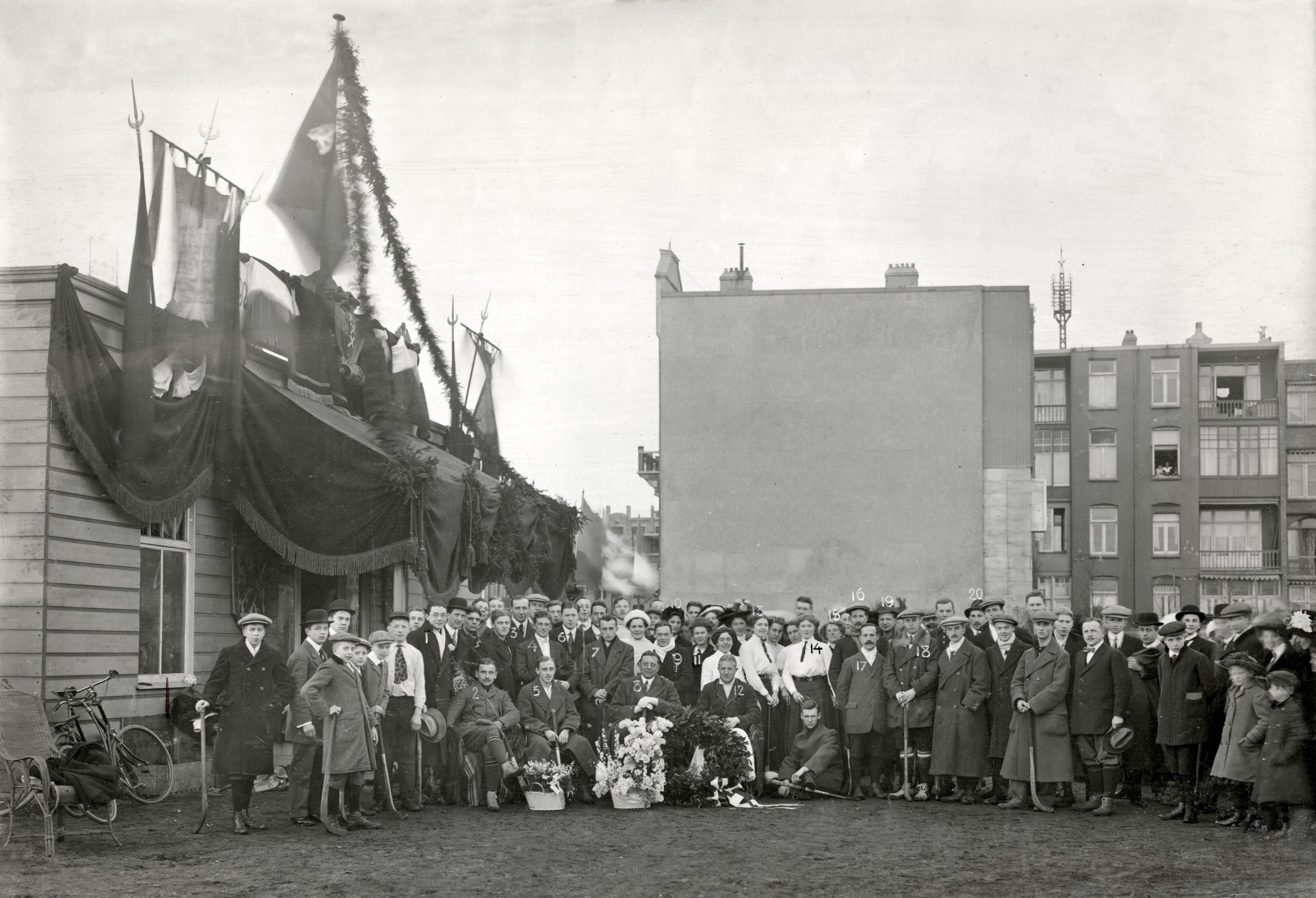
20th anniversary (1912)

Amsterdamsche Hockey & Bandy Club (founded 28 January 1892) is the oldest professional field hockey club of the Netherlands, based in Amstelveen. AH&BC is also the largest field hockey club in the city.

The team is a powerhouse of both domestic and international hockey. Both its men's and women's teams are annual contenders for the Dutch national titles. The men's team won its maiden European Cup in 2005.

Originally, the club also played bandy, as is still reflected in the club's name.

== History ==
The club was founded in 1892 and is seen as the oldest hockey club of the Netherlands and the European mainland. In the early years, bandy was the most important sport. When there was no ice in the summer they would play field hockey. Because of the 1928 Summer Olympics, when the Netherlands national hockey team won the silver medal at the field hockey tournament, the regard towards hockey changed. From that moment onwards, field hockey became the most important sport for the club.

== Honours ==
=== Men ===
National Title / Hoofdklasse

- Winners (22): 1924–25, 1925–26, 1926–27, 1927–28, 1928–29, 1931–32, 1932–33, 1933–34, 1936–37, 1961–62, 1963–64, 1964–65, 1965–66, 1974–75, 1993–94, 1994–95, 1996–97, 2002–03, 2003–04, 2010–11, 2011–12, 2024–25
- Runners-up (15): 1905–06, 1906–07, 1908–09, 1916–17, 1973–74, 1982–83, 1983–84, 1988–89, 1997–98, 2001–02, 2005–06, 2007–08, 2008–09, 2015–16, 2017–18

Gold Cup

- Winners (1): 2018–19

KNHB Cup

- Winners (1): 1995–96
- Runners-up (1): 1994–95

Euro Hockey League

- Runners-up (2): 2011–12, 2015–16

European Cup

- Winners (1): 2005
- Runners-up (3): 1995, 1996, 1998

Cup Winners' Cup

- Winners (2): 1999, 2003

Hoofdklasse Indoor

- Winners (11): 1987–88, 1988–89, 2008–09, 2009–10, 2011–12, 2014–15, 2015–16, 2016–17, 2017–18, 2019–20, 2024–25

EuroHockey Indoor Club Cup

- Winners (1): 2026
- Runners-up (1): 1990

EuroHockey Indoor Club Trophy

- Winners (1): 2016

=== Women ===
National title / Hoofdklasse

- Winners (22): 1936–37, 1937–38, 1948–49, 1970–71, 1971–72, 1973–74, 1974–75, 1975–76, 1978–79, 1979–80, 1980–81, 1982–83, 1983–84, 1986–87, 1988–89, 1990–91, 1991–92, 2008–09, 2012–13, 2018–19, 2022–23, 2025–26
- Hoofdklasse runners-up (18): 1981–82, 1984–85, 1987–88, 1989–90, 1992–93, 1996–97, 1997–98, 1998–99, 1999–00, 2003–04, 2004–05, 2005–06, 2006–07, 2007–08, 2015–16, 2016–17, 2017–18, 2020–21

Gold Cup

- Runners-up (1): 2023–24

Euro Hockey League

- Winners (2): 2022, 2024

European Cup

- Winners (14): 1975, 1976, 1977, 1978, 1979, 1980, 1981, 1982, 1988, 1989, 1990, 1992, 2014, 2019
- Runners-up (1): 1993

Cup Winners' Cup

- Winners (6): 1998, 1999, 2001, 2005, 2006, 2009

Hoofdklasse Indoor

- Winners (5): 1971–72, 1986–87, 2012–13, 2016–17, 2017–18

== Players ==
=== Current squad ===
==== Women's squad ====
As of 13 September 2024

No.	Pos.	Nation	Player
1	GK	NED	Anne Veenendaal
2	GK	NED	Mette van Zanten
3	DF	NED	Gabrielle Mosch
5	DF	ARG	Agustina Gorzelany
6	DF	NED	Noa Muller
7	FW	NED	Alessia Norbiato
8		NED	Renske Balemans
10	MF	NED	Felice Albers
11	FW	NED	Maria Verschoor
12	FW	NED	Fay van der Elst
13	DF	NED	Sabine Plönissen

No.	Pos.	Nation	Player
14	MF	NED	Ilse Kappelle
15	FW	NED	Freeke Moes (Captain)
16	MF	NED	Noor de Baat
17		NED	Amina Addou
18	DF	NED	Floor de Haan
19	FW	NED	Marijn Veen
20	FW	NED	Michelle Fillet
21	MF	NED	Fiona Morgenstern
22	MF	NED	Stella van Gils
24	DF	NED	Carmen Vincentie
25	DF	NED	Charlotte Adegeest

==== Men's squad ====
As of 25 September 2026

No.	Pos.	Nation	Player
1	GK	ENG	Ollie Payne
2	FW	RSA	Mustapha Cassiem
3	GK	NED	Giovanni Brand
4	DF	NED	Tjeerd Boermans
5	MF	NED	Luke Dommershuijzen
6	DF	NED	Lucas Middendorp
7	FW	RSA	Dayaan Cassiem
8	MF	NED	Sam Steins Bisschop
12	MF	NED	Lucas Corstens
13	MF	NED	Casper Berkman
14	FW	NED	Duco Telgenkamp

No.	Pos.	Nation	Player
15	MF	ENG	Tom Sorsby
17	FW	NED	Brent van Bijnen
18		NED	Thije Harm
20	FW	NED	Boris Burkhardt (Captain)
22	DF	NED	Robbert Kemperman
24		NED	Joost Tolboom
28		NED	Sam van der Weijden
33	GK	NED	Klaas Veering
34	DF	BEL	Olivier Biekens
35	FW	NED	David Huussen
77	MF	NED	Floris Middendorp (Captain)

=== Notable players ===
- Pol Amat
- Santi Freixa
- Helen van der Ben
- Carina Benninga
- Truid Blaisse-Terwindt
- Jacques Brinkman
- Charles Coster van Voorhout
- Marten Eikelboom
- Paul van Esseveldt
- Marjolein Eijsvogel
- Floris Evers
- Pierre Hermans
- Taco van den Honert
- Jacob van der Hoeven
- Timme Hoyng
- Bart Looije
- Jesse Mahieu
