= Janne Müller-Wieland =

German field hockey player (born 1986)

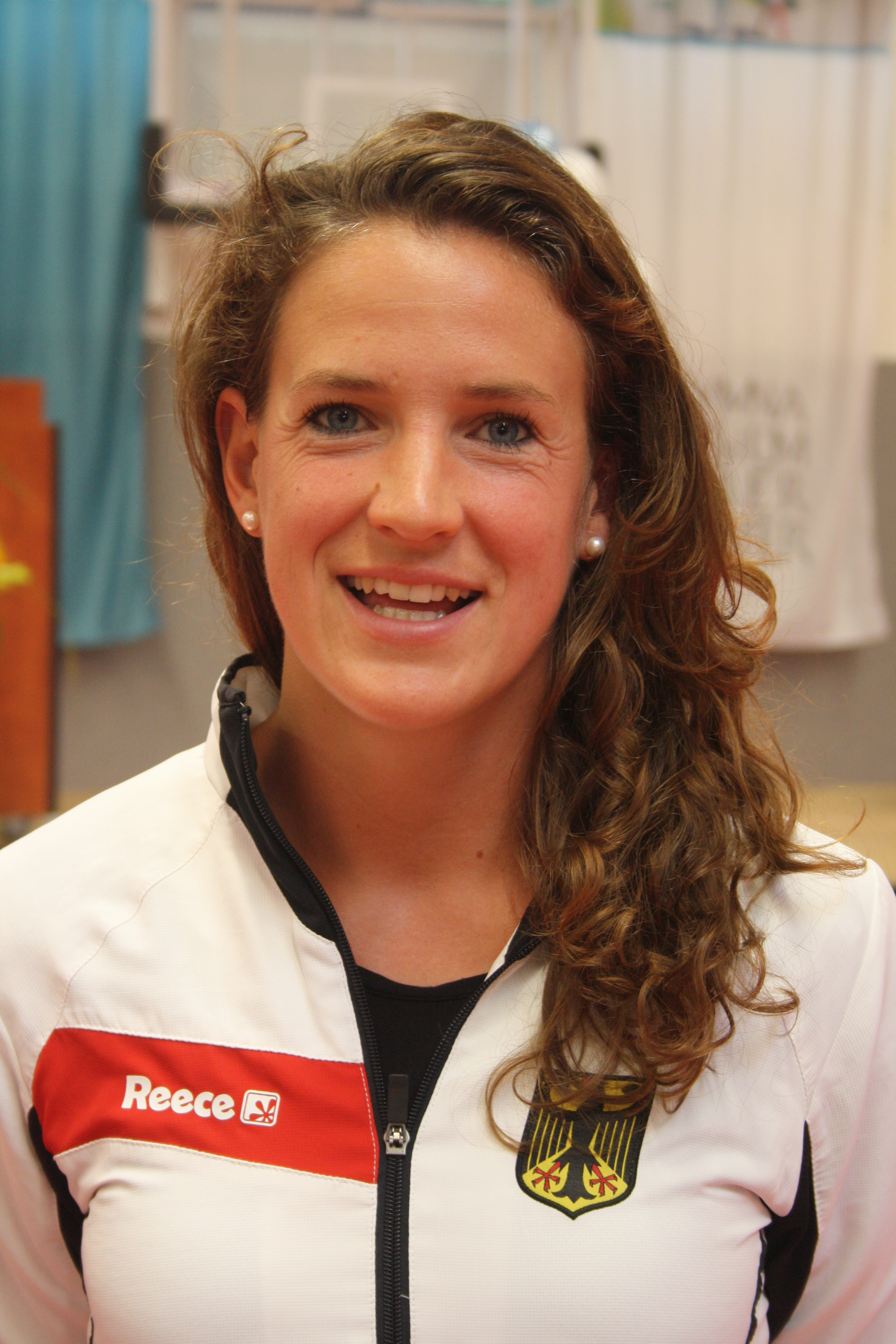

Personal information
- Born: 28 October 1986 (age 39) Hamburg, West Germany
- Height: 1.75 m (5 ft 9 in)
- Weight: 69 kg (152 lb)

Sport
- Sport: Field hockey
- Position: Defender
- Club: UHC Hamburg
National team
Years	Team	Caps	Goals
2006–	Germany	279	(13)
Medal record
Olympic Games
Bronze medal – third place	2016 Rio de Janeiro	Team
European Championship
Silver medal – second place	2019 Antwerp
Indoor World Cup
Gold medal – first place	2018 Berlin

Janne Müller-Wieland (born 28 October 1986) is a German field hockey player who competed in the 2008 and 2012 Summer Olympics.
