= Lidewij Welten =

Dutch field hockey player

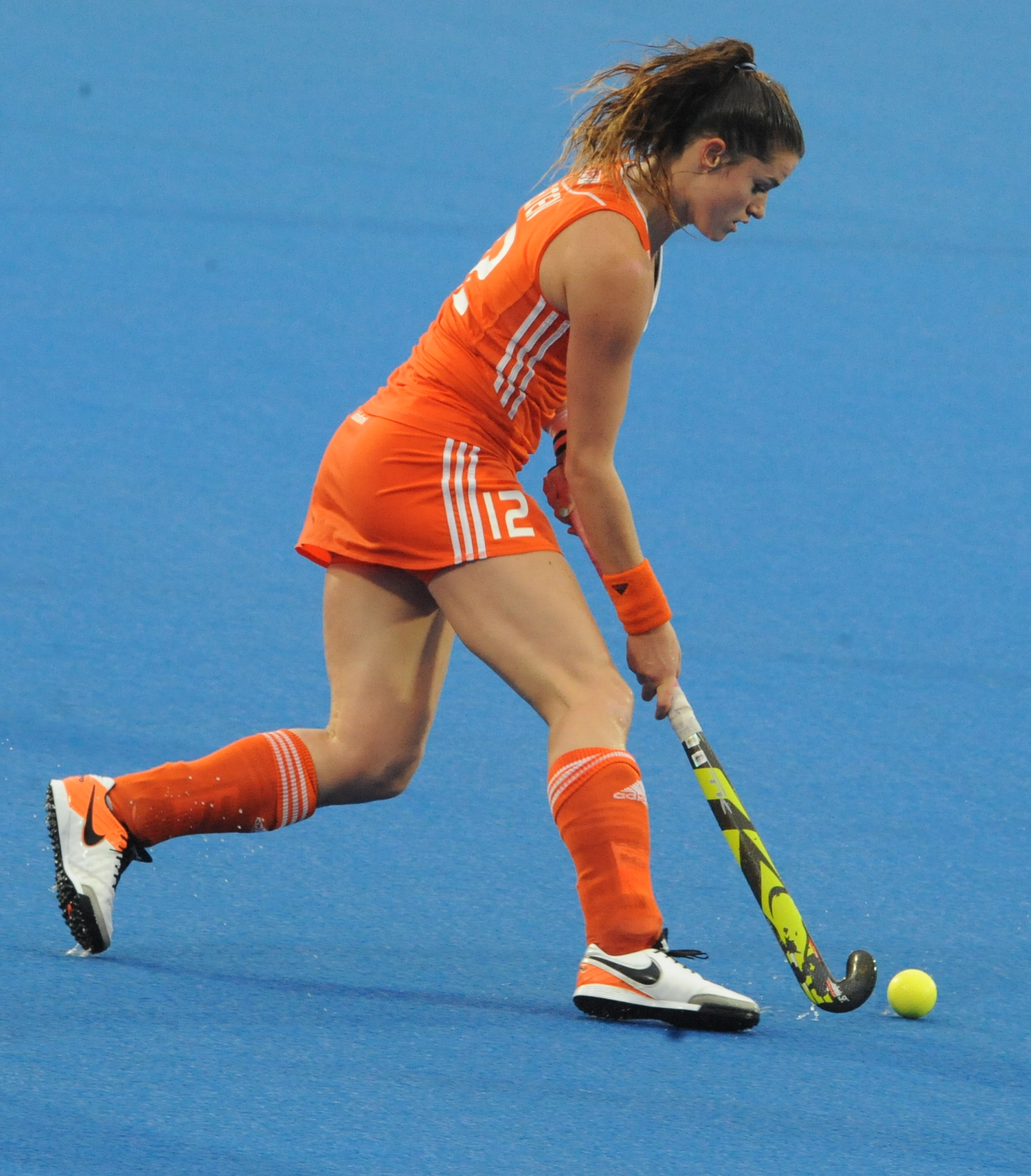

Personal information
- Born: 16 July 1990 (age 36) Eindhoven, Netherlands
- Height: 1.69 m (5 ft 7 in)
- Weight: 64 kg (141 lb)

Sport
- Sport: Field hockey
- Position: Forward
- Club: HC 's-Hertogenbosch
Senior career
Years	Team	Caps	Goals
2005-	HC 's-Hertogenbosch	-	-
National team
Years	Team	Caps	Goals
2008–2024	Netherlands	187	(71)
Medal record
Olympic Games
Gold medal – first place	2008 Beijing	Team
Gold medal – first place	2012 London	Team
Gold medal – first place	2020 Tokyo	Team
Silver medal – second place	2016 Rio de Janeiro	Team
World Cup
Gold medal – first place	2014 The Hague
Gold medal – first place	2018 London
Gold medal – first place	2022 Terrassa/Amstelveen
Silver medal – second place	2010 Rosario
European Championship
Gold medal – first place	2009 Amstelveen
Gold medal – first place	2011 Gladbach
Gold medal – first place	2017 Amstelveen
Gold medal – first place	2019 Antwerp
Silver medal – second place	2015 London
Champions Trophy
Gold medal – first place	2011 Amsterdam
Silver medal – second place	2010 Nottingham
Bronze medal – third place	2009 Sydney
Bronze medal – third place	2012 Rosario
Bronze medal – third place	2014 Mendoza

Lidewij Welten (born 16 July 1990) is a Dutch field hockey player.

Welten was a part of the Dutch national team in the youth and is seen as one of the most promising talents in the world. National coach Marc Lammers selected her for the 2008 Summer Olympics in Beijing, which was the first major international tournament she participated in.

At the 2008 Summer Olympics in Beijing she won an Olympic gold medal with the Dutch national team beating China in the final 2–0. She won a second gold medal at the 2012 Summer Olympics. At the 2016 Olympics, she was part of the Dutch team that won silver.

At the 2018 Women's Hockey World Cup in London, she won the gold medal with the Dutch team beating Ireland in the final 6–0 where she scored one of the goals. She was named player of the tournament.

On January 27, 2024, she announced via Instagram she was let go from the Dutch national team

== International goals ==
No.	Date	Venue	Opponent	Score	Result	Competition
1.	22 August 2009	Amsterdam, Netherlands	Azerbaijan	8–0	10–0	2009 Women's EuroHockey Nations Championship
2.	29 August 2009	Amsterdam, Netherlands	Germany	1–1	3–2	2009 Women's EuroHockey Nations Championship
3.	27 August 2011	Mönchengladbach, Germany	Germany	3–0	3–0	2011 Women's EuroHockey Championship
