= Lisa Hahn =

German field hockey player

Lisa Altenburg
Personal information
- Born: Lisa Hahn; 23 September 1989 (age 36) Mönchengladbach, West Germany
- Height: 1.47 m (4 ft 10 in)
- Weight: 58 kg (128 lb)

Sport
- Sport: Field hockey
- Position: Forward
- Club: Club an der Alster
National team
Years	Team	Caps	Goals
2008–	Germany	122	(30)
Medal record
Olympic Games
Bronze medal – third place	2016 Rio	Team
European Championship
Silver medal – second place	2021 Amstelveen
Indoor World Cup
Gold medal – first place	2018 Berlin

Lisa Altenburg (née Hahn, born 23 September 1989) is a German field hockey player. She was part of the German bronze medal-winning team at the 2016 Olympic Games and also played for Germany at the 2012 Summer Olympics. She is the niece of Birgit Hahn who also played Olympic hockey for Germany.
