= Jana Teschke =

German field hockey player

Personal information
- Born: 22 September 1990 (age 35) Hamburg, West Germany
- Height: 1.68 m (5 ft 6 in)
- Weight: 56 kg (123 lb)

Sport
- Sport: Field hockey
- Position: Midfielder
- Club: Uhlenhorster HC
National team
Years	Team	Caps	Goals
2011–	Germany	168	(5)
Medal record
Women's field hockey
Representing Germany
Olympic Games
Bronze medal – third place	2016 Rio de Janeiro	Team

Jana Polk (née Teschke, born 22 September 1990) is a German field hockey player. She represented her country at the 2016 Summer Olympics.
