= Marie Mävers =

German field hockey player

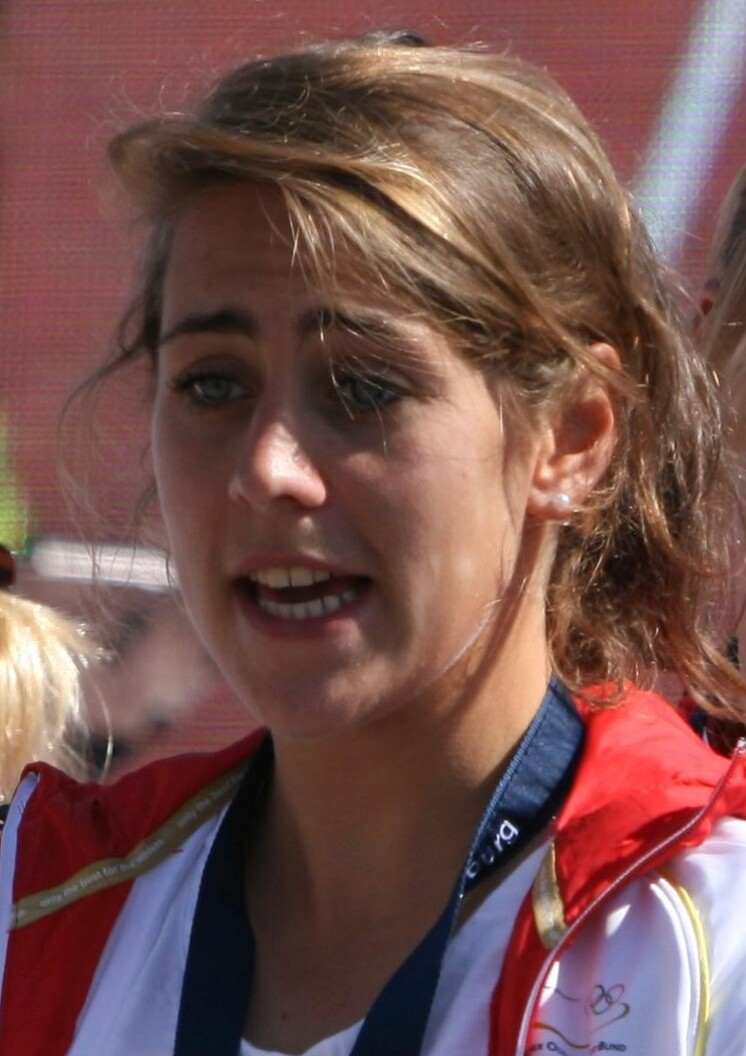

Personal information
- Born: 13 February 1991 (age 35) Hamburg, Germany
- Height: 1.70 m (5 ft 7 in)
- Weight: 67 kg (148 lb)

Sport
- Sport: Field hockey
- Position: Forward
- Club: UHC Hamburg
National team
Years	Team	Caps	Goals
2010–	Germany	198	(58)
Medal record
Olympic Games
Bronze medal – third place	2016 Rio de Janeiro	Team
Indoor World Cup
Gold medal – first place	2018 Berlin

Marie Mävers (born 13 February 1991) is a German field hockey player. At the 2012 Summer Olympics, she competed for the Germany women's national field hockey team in the women's event. That team finished in seventh. Mävers returned to the Olympics as part of the German 2016 Olympic team, which won a bronze medal.
