= Uhlenhorster HC =

German field hockey and tennis club

UHC Hamburg
- Full name: Uhlenhorster Hockey-Club e.V. Hamburg
- Nickname(s): UHC Hamburg
- Short name: UHC
- League: Men's Bundesliga; Women's Bundesliga
- Founded: 21 March 1901; 125 years ago
- Home ground: UHC-Clubanlage, Hamburg (Capacity 400)
- Website: Club website
Home	Away

Uhlenhorster Hockey-Club e. V. (also known as UHC Hamburg) is a German professional field hockey and tennis club based in Hamburg. It was founded in 1901, since 1923 their home ground is located in Hummelsbüttel, Wandsbek.

Uhlenhorster HC is one of the most successful clubs in Germany, both at the Senior and Academy levels, with squads playing in the Men's and Women's Bundesligas. The men's side have won the Euro Hockey League three times. Uhlenhorster Hockey Club Academy is one of the leading hockey academies in Europe and has produced a number of international players.

== Honours ==
=== Men ===
Bundesliga

- Runners-up (8): 1942–43, 1964–65, 2003–04, 2006–07, 2008–09, 2009–10, 2014–15, 2015–16

Euro Hockey League

- Winners (3): 2007–08, 2009–10, 2011–12
- Runners-up (2): 2008–09, 2014–15

Indoor Bundesliga

- Winners (4): 1963–64, 2001–02, 2017–18, 2025–26
- Runners-up(3): 1962–63, 2010–11, 2011–12

EuroHockey Indoor Club Cup

- Runners-up (1): 2003

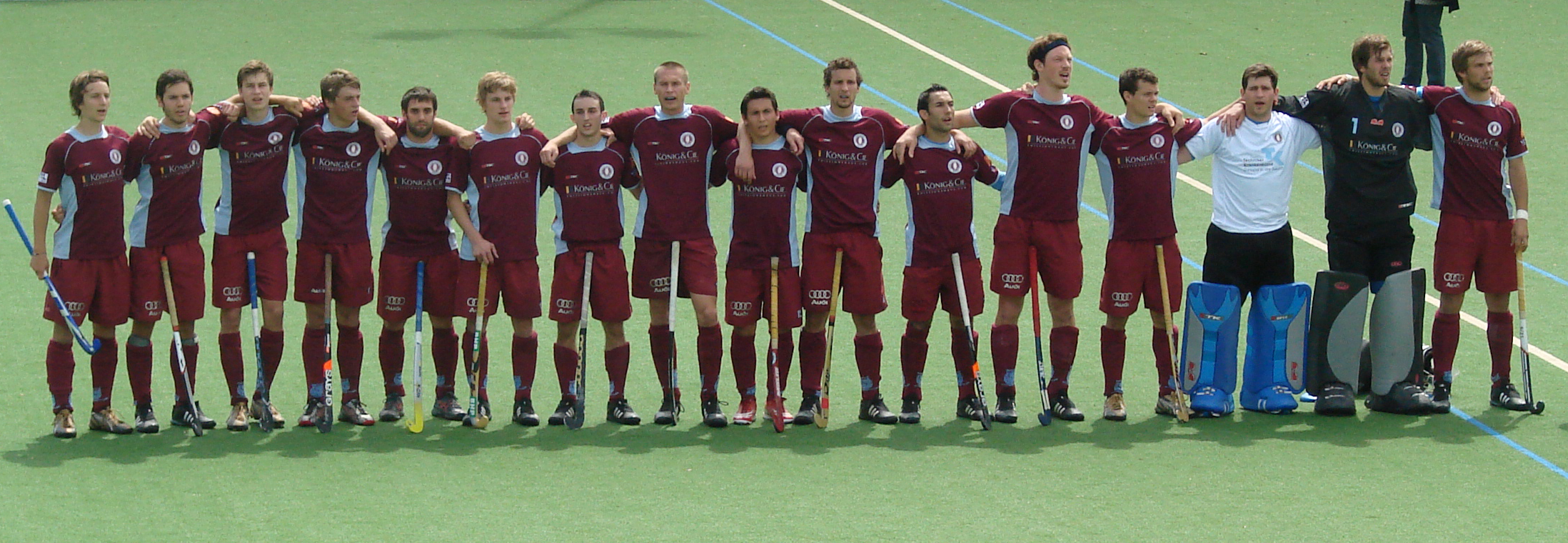
UHC men's team (2009)

=== Women ===
Bundesliga

- Winners (6): 1962–63, 2008–09, 2010–11, 2014–15, 2015–16, 2016–17
- Runners-up (11): 1956–57, 1957–58, 1958–59, 1959–60, 1960–61, 1961–62, 2009–10, 2011–12, 2012–13, 2013–14, 2017–18

EuroHockey Club Cup

- Runners-up (3): 2010, 2017, 2018

Indoor Bundesliga

- Winners (2): 2013–14, 2016–17
- Runners-up (2): 1962–63, 2009–10

EuroHockey Indoor Club Cup

- Winners (2): 2015, 2018

== Current squad ==
=== Men's squad ===
As of 2021–22

No.	Pos.	Nation	Player
3	MF	GER	Michel Struthoff
4	MF	GER	Tino Teschke
6	DF	GER	Caspar Stucke
7	MF	GER	Maximilian Kloss
8	FW	GER	Julius Schmid
9	FW	SCO	Cameron Golden
11	MF	GER	Leopold Harms
12	DF	GER	Tom Schmidt-Didlaukies
13	DF	GER	Niklas Thiel
15	DF	GER	Nick Nouschirvan
16	FW	GER	Frederik Zentner
17	FW	ITA	Henry Förster
18	MF	SCO	Michael Bremner

No.	Pos.	Nation	Player
20	DF	GER	Ken Gorny
21	GK	GER	Florian Leonhart
22	MF	GER	Christopher Kutter
23	MF	NZL	Dylan Thomas
24	MF	GER	Tim Schwieren
25	MF	GER	Hannes Müller
26	FW	GER	Gian Graffitti
27	MF	GER	Henry Steikowsky
28	DF	GER	Tim Bamberg
29	FW	GER	Henri Schmid
30	MF	GER	Philip Schmid
31	GK	GER	Moritz Bretschneider
32	DF	GER	Benedikt Schwarzhaupt

== Notable players ==
=== Men's internationals ===
Germany

- Florian Fuchs
- Moritz Fürste
- Nicolas Jacobi
- Oliver Korn
- Jan-Philipp Rabente

Argentina

- Germán Orozco
- Matías Paredes

New Zealand

- Shea McAleese

Soviet Union

- Sos Hayrapetyan

Spain

- Xavier Ribas

=== Women's internationals ===
Ireland

- Nicola Evans

== Coaches ==
- (Germany) Tina Bachmann
