= Sarah Hawkshaw =

Ireland women's hockey international

Personal information
- Born: 4 November 1995 (age 30) Dublin, Ireland
- Height: 170 cm (5 ft 7 in)

Sport
- Sport: Field hockey
- Position: Forward/Midfielder
Youth career
- Years: Team
- 200x–201x: Mount Sackville
- 200x–201x: → Leinster
Senior career
Years	Team	Caps	Goals
201x–2014	Railway Union	-	-
2014–2018	UMass Minutewomen	-	-
2018–	Railway Union	-	-
National team
Years	Team	Caps	Goals
2019–	Ireland	23	(9)
Medal record
Women's field hockey
Representing Ireland
FIH Nations Cup
Silver medal – second place	2023–24 Terrassa

Sarah Hawkshaw (born 4 November 1995) is an Ireland women's field hockey international. She has also played for Railway Union in the Women's Irish Hockey League and for UMass Minutewomen in the NCAA Division I Field Hockey Championship.

== Early years, family and education ==
Hawkshaw is the daughter of Sean and Anne Hawkshaw. She has three brothers – Daniel, David and James. Her younger brother, David Hawkshaw, is an Ireland under-20 rugby union international and in 2019 he captained Ireland to a Grand Slam. Sarah Hawkshaw was educated at St Brigid's National School, Castleknock and at Mount Sackville. In addition to playing field hockey, in her youth Hawkshaw also played Gaelic football and competed as a cross country runner. She played Gaelic football for St Brigid's National School, St Brigid's GAA (Dublin) and Dublin at youth level. As a cross country runner, Hawkshaw represented both Mount Sackville and Clonliffe Harriers. Between 2014 and 2018 Hawkshaw attended the University of Massachusetts on a sports scholarship and gained a BS in Public Health Sciences.

== Domestic teams ==
=== Mount Sackville ===
In 2013 Hawkshaw was a member of the Mount Sackville team that won the Leinster Schoolgirl's Senior Plate final. She scored the winner from a penalty corner as Mount Sackville defeated a St Gerard's School team featuring Elena Tice 2–1.

=== Leinster ===
Hawkshaw represented Leinster in interprovincial tournaments, playing at under-16, under-18 and under-21 levels.

=== Railway Union ===
Together with Cecelia and Isobel Joyce, Emer Lucey, Kate McKenna and Grace O'Flanagan, Hawkshaw was a member of the Railway Union team that played in the 2014 EuroHockey Club Champions Cup. She subsequently left Railway Union to study at the University of Massachusetts. In 2018 she returned to Railway Union to play in the Women's Irish Hockey League.

=== UMass Minutewomen ===
Between 2014 and 2018, while attending the University of Massachusetts, Hawkshaw played for the UMass Minutewomen. She played for the UMass Minutewomen in both the 2015 and 2016 NCAA Division I Field Hockey Championships.

== Ireland international ==
In January 2019, Hawkshaw made her senior debut for Ireland against Chile. She had previously represented Ireland at under-16, under-18 and under-23 levels. She made her major tournament at the 2018–19 Women's FIH Series Finals. She subsequently represented Ireland at the 2019 Women's EuroHockey Nations Championship.

Tournaments

	Place
2018–19 Women's FIH Series Finals	2nd
2019 Women's EuroHockey Nations Championship	5th

Goals

Goal	Date	Location	Opponent	Score	Result	Competition	Ref.
1	13 January 2019	Santiago, Chile	Chile	1–1	2–2	Test Match	
2	1 February 2019	Santomera, Murcia	India	1–1	1–1	Test Match	
3	9 June 2019	Banbridge	Czech Republic	5–0	8–1	2018–19 Women's FIH Series Finals	
4	11 June 2019	Banbridge	Singapore	6–0	11–0	2018–19 Women's FIH Series Finals	
5	15 June 2019	Banbridge	Czech Republic	3–0	4–0	2018–19 Women's FIH Series Finals	
6	30 July 2019	Stormont	Italy	3–1	4–1	Test Match	
7	7 August 2019	Antwerp	Belgium	1–1	2–4	Test Match	
8	21 August 2019	Antwerp	Germany	1–1	1–1	2019 Women's EuroHockey Nations Championship	
9	25 August 2019	Antwerp	Russia	2–1	3–2	2019 Women's EuroHockey Nations Championship	

== Employment ==
Since September 2018, Hawkshaw has worked as a field hockey coach at both The King's Hospital and Mount Sackville.

== Honours ==
Ireland

- FIH Hockey Series
  - Runners Up: 2018–19
