= International cricket in 2013–14 =

Cricket season

The 2013–2014 international cricket season was from September 2013 to March 2014.

== Season overview ==
International tours
Start date	Home team	Away team	Results [Matches]		
Start date	Home team	Away team	Test	ODI	T20I
9 October 2013	Bangladesh	New Zealand	0–0 [2]	3–0 [3]	0–1 [1]
10 October 2013	India	Australia	—	3–2 [7]	1–0 [1]
14 October 2013	Pakistan	South Africa	1–1 [2]	1–4 [5]	0–2 [2]
6 November 2013	India	West Indies	2–0 [2]	2–1 [3]	—
10 November 2013	Sri Lanka	New Zealand	—	1–1 [3]	1–0 [2]
20 November 2013	South Africa	Pakistan	—	1–2 [3]	1–1 [2]
21 November 2013	Australia	England	5–0 [5]	4–1 [5]	3–0 [3]
3 December 2013	New Zealand	West Indies	2–0 [3]	2–2 [5]	2–0 [2]
5 December 2013	South Africa	India	1–0 [2]	2–0 [3]	—
8 December 2013	Pakistan	Afghanistan	—	—	1–0 [1]
11 December 2013	Pakistan	Sri Lanka	1–1 [3]	3–2 [5]	1–1 [2]
19 January 2014	New Zealand	India	1–0 [2]	4–0 [5]	—
27 January 2014	Bangladesh	Sri Lanka	0–1 [2]	0–3 [3]	0–2 [2]
12 February 2014	South Africa	Australia	1–2 [3]	—	0–2 [3]
19 February 2014	West Indies	Ireland	—	1–0 [1]	1–1 [2]
28 February 2014	West Indies	England	—	1–2 [3]	2–1 [3]
International tournaments
Dates	Tournament			Winners	
25 February 2014	(Bangladesh) Asia Cup			Sri Lanka	
15 March 2014	(Bangladesh) ICC World Twenty20			Sri Lanka	
Women's tours
Start date	Home team	Away team	Results [Matches]		
Start date	Home team	Away team	Test	ODI	T20I
6 October 2013	West Indies	New Zealand	–	2–1 [3]	–
24 October 2013	South Africa	Sri Lanka	–	2–0 [3]	2–1 [3]
29 October 2013	West Indies	England	–	0–2 [3]	–
10 January 2014	Australia	England	0–1 [1]	2–1 [3]	2–1 [3]
17 January 2014	India	Sri Lanka	–	3–0 [3]	1–2 [3]
22 February 2014	New Zealand	West Indies	–	3–0 [3]	4–0 [5]
4 March 2014	Bangladesh	Pakistan	–	2–0 [2]	0–2 [2]
9 March 2014	Bangladesh	India	–	–	0–3 [3]
Women's international tournaments
Start date	Tournament			Winners	
10 January 2014	(Qatar) 2013–14 PCB Women's Tri-Nation WODI Series			South Africa	
19 January 2014	(Qatar) 2013–14 PCB Women's Tri-Nation WT20I Series			Pakistan	
23 March 2014	(Bangladesh) 2014 ICC Women's World Twenty20			Australia	
Minor tours
Start date	Home team	Away team	Results [Matches]		
Start date	Home team	Away team	FC	List A	T20
22 September 2013	UAE	Namibia	1–0 [1]	2–0 [2]	—
30 September 2013	Afghanistan	Kenya	1–0 [1]	2–0 [2]	1–1 [2]
Minor tournaments
Start date	Tournament			Winners	
15 November 2013	(United Arab Emirates) ICC World Twenty20 Qualifier			Ireland	
10 December 2013	(United Arab Emirates) ICC Intercontinental Cup Final			Ireland	
13 January 2014	(New Zealand) Cricket World Cup Qualifier			Scotland	
6 March 2014	(Malaysia) World Cricket League Division Five			Jersey	

== Rankings ==
The following were the ICC official Test, ODI and T20I rankings as of January 2014.

ICC Test Championship 29 January 2014
Rank	Team	Matches	Points	Rating
1	South Africa	30	3988	133
2	India	36	4213	117
3	Australia	39	4314	111
4	England	44	4713	107
5	Pakistan	29	2890	100
6	Sri Lanka	30	2703	90
7	West Indies	29	2516	87
8	New Zealand	34	2773	82
9	Zimbabwe	11	372	34
10	Bangladesh	16	285	18

ICC ODI Championship 29 January 2014
Rank	Team	Matches	Points	Rating
1	Australia	47	5505	117
2	India	62	7172	116
3	South Africa	44	4825	110
4	England	47	5102	109
5	Sri Lanka	56	6059	108
6	Pakistan	58	5873	101
7	New Zealand	42	3882	92
8	West Indies	48	4300	90
9	Bangladesh	26	2165	83
10	Zimbabwe	26	1439	55
11	Ireland	11	423	38

ICC T20I Championship 29 January 2014
Rank	Team	Matches	Points	Rating
1	Sri Lanka	20	2570	129
2	India	15	1843	123
3	South Africa	23	2818	123
4	Pakistan	30	3638	121
5	West Indies	19	2148	113
6	Australia	23	2526	110
7	New Zealand	23	2475	108
8	England	24	2522	105
9	Ireland	9	783	87
10	Bangladesh	11	791	72
11	Afghanistan	13	908	70
12	Netherlands	9	508	56
13	Scotland	11	545	50
14	Zimbabwe	12	553	46
15	Kenya	15	633	42
16	Canada	6	11	2

== September ==
=== Namibia in the United Arab Emirates ===
2011–13 ICC Intercontinental Cup
No.	Date	Home captain	Away captain	Venue	Result
First-class	22–23 September	Khurram Khan	Raymond van Schoor	Sharjah Cricket Stadium, Sharjah	United Arab Emirates by 9 wickets
2011–13 ICC World Cricket League Championship
No.	Date	Home captain	Away captain	Venue	Result
List A	27 September	Khurram Khan	Raymond van Schoor	Sharjah Cricket Stadium, Sharjah	United Arab Emirates by 158 runs
List A	29 September	Khurram Khan	Raymond van Schoor	Sharjah Cricket Stadium, Sharjah	United Arab Emirates by 135 runs

=== Afghanistan vs Kenya in the United Arab Emirates ===
T20I series
No.	Date	Home captain	Away captain	Venue	Result
T20I 330	30 September	Mohammad Nabi	Collins Obuya	Sharjah Cricket Stadium, Sharjah	Afghanistan by 106 runs
T20I 332	11 October	Mohammad Nabi	Collins Obuya	Sharjah Cricket Stadium, Sharjah	Kenya by 34 runs
2011–13 ICC World Cricket League Championship
No.	Date	Home captain	Away captain	Venue	Result
ODI 3417	2 October	Mohammad Nabi	Collins Obuya	Sharjah Cricket Stadium, Sharjah	Afghanistan by 8 wickets
ODI 3418	4 October	Mohammad Nabi	Collins Obuya	Sharjah Cricket Stadium, Sharjah	Afghanistan by 7 wickets
2011–13 ICC Intercontinental Cup
No.	Date	Home captain	Away captain	Venue	Result
First-class	6–9 October	Asghar Stanikzai	Collins Obuya	ICC Global Cricket Academy, Dubai	Afghanistan by 8 wickets

== October ==
=== New Zealand women in the West Indies ===
WODI series
No.	Date	Home captain	Away captain	Venue	Result
WODI 887	6 October	Merissa Aguilleira	Suzie Bates	Sabina Park, Kingston	New Zealand by 1 run
WODI 888	8 October	Merissa Aguilleira	Suzie Bates	Sabina Park, Kingston	West Indies by 89 runs
WODI 889	10 October	Merissa Aguilleira	Suzie Bates	Sabina Park, Kingston	West Indies by 95 runs

=== New Zealand in Bangladesh ===
Test series
No.	Date	Home captain	Away captain	Venue	Result
Test 2097	9–13 October	Mushfiqur Rahim	Brendon McCullum	Zahur Ahmed Chowdhury Stadium, Chittagong	Match drawn
Test 2099	21–25 October	Mushfiqur Rahim	Brendon McCullum	Sher-e-Bangla National Stadium, Mirpur	Match drawn
ODI series
No.	Date	Home captain	Away captain	Venue	Result
ODI 3423	29 October	Mushfiqur Rahim	Brendon McCullum	Sher-e-Bangla National Stadium, Mirpur	Bangladesh by 43 runs (D/L)
ODI 3426	31 October	Mushfiqur Rahim	Brendon McCullum	Sher-e-Bangla National Stadium, Mirpur	Bangladesh by 40 runs
ODI 3429	3 November	Mushfiqur Rahim	Kyle Mills	Khan Shaheb Osman Ali Stadium, Fatullah	Bangladesh by 4 wickets
Only T20I
No.	Date	Home captain	Away captain	Venue	Result
T20I 333	6 November	Mushfiqur Rahim	Kyle Mills	Sher-e-Bangla National Stadium, Mirpur	New Zealand by 15 runs

=== Australia in India ===
Only T20I
No.	Date	Home captain	Away captain	Venue	Result
T20I 331	10 October	Mahendra Singh Dhoni	George Bailey	Saurashtra Cricket Association Stadium, Rajkot	India by 6 wickets
ODI series
No.	Date	Home captain	Away captain	Venue	Result
ODI 3419	13 October	Mahendra Singh Dhoni	George Bailey	Maharashtra Cricket Association Stadium, Pune	Australia by 72 runs
ODI 3420	16 October	Mahendra Singh Dhoni	George Bailey	Sawai Mansingh Stadium, Jaipur	India by 9 wickets
ODI 3421	19 October	Mahendra Singh Dhoni	George Bailey	I. S. Bindra Stadium, Mohali	Australia by 4 wickets
ODI 3422	23 October	Mahendra Singh Dhoni	George Bailey	JSCA International Stadium Complex, Ranchi	No result
ODI 3422a	26 October	Mahendra Singh Dhoni	George Bailey	Barabati Stadium, Cuttack	Match abandoned
ODI 3424	30 October	Mahendra Singh Dhoni	George Bailey	Vidarbha Cricket Association Stadium, Nagpur	India by 6 wickets
ODI 3428	2 November	Mahendra Singh Dhoni	George Bailey	M. Chinnaswamy Stadium, Bengaluru	India by 57 runs

=== Pakistan vs South Africa in the United Arab Emirates ===
Test series
No.	Date	Home captain	Away captain	Venue	Result
Test 2098	14–18 October	Misbah-ul-Haq	Graeme Smith	Sheikh Zayed Stadium, Abu Dhabi	Pakistan by 7 wickets
Test 2100	23–27 October	Misbah-ul-Haq	Graeme Smith	DSC Cricket Stadium, Dubai	South Africa by an innings and 92 runs
ODI series
No.	Date	Home captain	Away captain	Venue	Result
ODI 3425	30 October	Misbah-ul-Haq	AB de Villiers	Sharjah Cricket Stadium, Sharjah	South Africa by 1 run
ODI 3427	1 November	Misbah-ul-Haq	AB de Villiers	DSC Cricket Stadium, Dubai	Pakistan by 66 runs
ODI 3430	6 November	Misbah-ul-Haq	AB de Villiers	Sheikh Zayed Stadium, Abu Dhabi	South Africa by 68 runs
ODI 3431	8 November	Misbah-ul-Haq	AB de Villiers	Sheikh Zayed Stadium, Abu Dhabi	South Africa by 28 runs
ODI 3433	11 November	Misbah-ul-Haq	AB de Villiers	Sharjah Cricket Stadium, Sharjah	South Africa by 117 runs
T20I series
No.	Date	Home captain	Away captain	Venue	Result
T20I 334	13 November	Mohammad Hafeez	Faf du Plessis	DSC Cricket Stadium, Dubai	South Africa by 9 wickets
T20I 336	15 November	Mohammad Hafeez	Faf du Plessis	DSC Cricket Stadium, Dubai	South Africa by 6 runs

=== Sri Lanka women in South Africa ===
WODI series
No.	Date	Home captain	Away captain	Venue	Result
WODI 890	24 October	Mignon du Preez	Shashikala Siriwardene	Senwes Park, Potchefstroom	South Africa by 7 wickets
WODI 891	26 October	Mignon du Preez	Shashikala Siriwardene	Senwes Park, Potchefstroom	South Africa by 57 runs
WODI 892	28 October	Mignon du Preez	Shashikala Siriwardene	Senwes Park, Potchefstroom	No result
WT20I series
No.	Date	Home captain	Away captain	Venue	Result
WT20I 221	31 October	Mignon du Preez	Shashikala Siriwardene	Senwes Park, Potchefstroom	South Africa by 7 wickets
WT20I 222	2 November	Mignon du Preez	Shashikala Siriwardene	Senwes Park, Potchefstroom	Sri Lanka by 20 runs
WT20I 223	4 November	Mignon du Preez	Shashikala Siriwardene	Senwes Park, Potchefstroom	South Africa by 5 wickets

=== England women in the West Indies ===
WODI series
No.	Date	Home captain	Away captain	Venue	Result
WODI 893	29 October	Merissa Aguilleira	Charlotte Edwards	Queen's Park Oval, Port of Spain	No result
WODI 894	1 November	Merissa Aguilleira	Charlotte Edwards	Queen's Park Oval, Port of Spain	England by 7 wickets
WODI 895	3 November	Merissa Aguilleira	Charlotte Edwards	Queen's Park Oval, Port of Spain	England by 89 runs

== November ==
=== West Indies in India ===
Test series
No.	Date	Home captain	Away captain	Venue	Result
Test 2101	6–10 November	Mahendra Singh Dhoni	Darren Sammy	Eden Gardens, Kolkata	India by an innings and 51 runs
Test 2102	14–18 November	Mahendra Singh Dhoni	Darren Sammy	Wankhede Stadium, Mumbai	India by an innings and 126 runs
ODI series
No.	Date	Home captain	Away captain	Venue	Result
ODI 3436	21 November	Mahendra Singh Dhoni	Dwayne Bravo	Nehru Stadium, Kochi	India by 6 wickets
ODI 3437	24 November	Mahendra Singh Dhoni	Dwayne Bravo	Dr. Y.S. Rajasekhara Reddy ACA-VDCA Cricket Stadium, Visakhapatnam	West Indies by 2 wickets
ODI 3439	27 November	Mahendra Singh Dhoni	Dwayne Bravo	Green Park Stadium, Kanpur	India by 5 wickets

=== New Zealand in Sri Lanka ===
ODI series
No.	Date	Home captain	Away captain	Venue	Result
ODI 3432	10 November	Angelo Mathews	Kyle Mills	Mahinda Rajapaksa International Stadium, Hambantota	No result
ODI 3434	12 November	Angelo Mathews	Kyle Mills	Mahinda Rajapaksa International Stadium, Hambantota	New Zealand by 4 wickets (D/L)
ODI 3435	16 November	Angelo Mathews	Kyle Mills	Rangiri Dambulla International Stadium, Dambulla	Sri Lanka by 36 runs (D/L)
T20I series
No.	Date	Home captain	Away captain	Venue	Result
T20I 339a	19 November	Dinesh Chandimal	Kyle Mills	Pallekele International Cricket Stadium, Pallekele	Match abandoned
T20I 341	21 November	Dinesh Chandimal	Kyle Mills	Pallekele International Cricket Stadium, Pallekele	Sri Lanka by 8 wickets

=== ICC World Twenty20 Qualifier ===
==== Group stage ====
Group A
Pos	Team	Pld	W	L	T	NR	Pts	NRR
1	Ireland	7	6	0	0	1	13	2.058
2	Hong Kong	7	5	2	0	0	10	0.440
3	United Arab Emirates	7	5	2	0	0	10	0.269
4	Namibia	7	4	3	0	0	8	0.197
5	Italy	7	2	4	0	1	5	0.457
6	Canada	7	2	5	0	0	4	−0.359
7	Uganda	7	1	5	0	1	3	−1.494
8	United States	7	1	5	0	1	3	−1.646

Group B
Pos	Team	Pld	W	L	T	NR	Pts	NRR
1	Afghanistan	7	6	1	0	0	12	1.207
2	Netherlands	7	5	2	0	0	10	1.087
3	Nepal	7	4	3	0	0	8	0.379
4	Scotland	7	4	3	0	0	8	0.379
5	Papua New Guinea	7	3	3	0	1	7	−0.053
6	Kenya	7	3	4	0	0	6	1.071
7	Bermuda	7	2	5	0	0	4	−1.255
8	Denmark	7	0	6	0	1	1	−3.216

Group stage
No.	Date	Group	Team 1	Captain 1	Team 2	Captain 2	Venue	Result
Match 1	15 November	A	Ireland	William Porterfield	Namibia	Sarel Burger	Sheikh Zayed Stadium, Abu Dhabi	Ireland by 32 runs
Match 2	15 November	A	United Arab Emirates	Khurram Khan	Uganda	Davis Arinaitwe	Sheikh Zayed Stadium Nursery 1, Abu Dhabi	United Arab Emirates by 8 wickets
Match 3	15 November	B	Denmark	Michael Pedersen	Nepal	Paras Khadka	ICC Academy Ground No. 2, Dubai	Nepal by 5 wickets
Match 4	15 November	B	Bermuda	Janeiro Tucker	Scotland	Kyle Coetzer	Sharjah Cricket Stadium, Sharjah	Bermuda by 18 runs
Match 5	15 November	A	Canada	Ashish Bagai	United States	Neil McGarrell	Sheikh Zayed Stadium, Abu Dhabi	United States by 5 wickets
Match 6	15 November	A	Hong Kong	Jamie Atkinson	Italy	Damian Crowley	Sheikh Zayed Stadium Nursery 1, Abu Dhabi	Hong Kong by 7 wickets
Match 7	15 November	B	Kenya	Collins Obuya	Papua New Guinea	Chris Amini	ICC Academy Ground No. 2, Dubai	Papua New Guinea by 4 wickets
T20I 335	15 November	B	Afghanistan	Mohammad Nabi	Netherlands	Peter Borren	Sharjah Cricket Stadium, Sharjah	Netherlands by 7 wickets
Match 9	16 November	A	United Arab Emirates	Khurram Khan	Namibia	Sarel Burger	Sheikh Zayed Stadium, Abu Dhabi	United Arab Emirates by 5 wickets
Match 10	16 November	B	Bermuda	Janeiro Tucker	Denmark	Michael Pedersen	ICC Academy, Dubai	Bermuda by 9 wickets
T20I 338	16 November	A	Canada	Ashish Bagai	Ireland	William Porterfield	Sheikh Zayed Stadium, Abu Dhabi	Ireland by 2 runs
Match 12	16 November	A	Hong Kong	Jamie Atkinson	Uganda	Davis Arinaitwe	Sheikh Zayed Stadium Nursery 1, Abu Dhabi	Hong Kong by 4 wickets
Match 13	16 November	A	Italy	Damian Crowley	United States	Neil McGarrell	Sheikh Zayed Stadium Nursery 2, Abu Dhabi	Italy by 6 wickets
Match 14	16 November	B	Netherlands	Peter Borren	Papua New Guinea	Chris Amini	ICC Academy, Dubai	Papua New Guinea by 52 runs
Match 15	16 November	B	Kenya	Collins Obuya	Nepal	Paras Khadka	ICC Academy Ground No. 2, Dubai	Nepal by 6 wickets
T20I 337	16 November	B	Afghanistan	Mohammad Nabi	Scotland	Kyle Coetzer	Sharjah Cricket Stadium, Sharjah	Afghanistan by 17 runs
Match 17	17 November	A	Namibia	Sarel Burger	United States	Neil McGarrell	Sheikh Zayed Stadium Nursery 1, Abu Dhabi	Namibia by 35 runs
Match 18	17 November	A	United Arab Emirates	Khurram Khan	Ireland	William Porterfield	Sheikh Zayed Stadium Nursery 2, Abu Dhabi	Ireland by 5 runs
Match 19	17 November	B	Bermuda	Janeiro Tucker	Netherlands	Peter Borren	ICC Academy, Dubai	Netherlands by 8 wickets
Match 20	17 November	B	Afghanistan	Mohammad Nabi	Papua New Guinea	Chris Amini	Sharjah Cricket Stadium, Sharjah	Afghanistan by 6 wickets
Match 21	18 November	A	Italy	Damian Crowley	Uganda	Davis Arinaitwe	Sheikh Zayed Stadium, Abu Dhabi	Uganda by 1 wicket
Match 22	18 November	B	Denmark	Michael Pedersen	Kenya	Collins Obuya	ICC Academy, Dubai	Kenya by 8 wickets
Match 23	18 November	A	Canada	Ashish Bagai	Hong Kong	Jamie Atkinson	Sheikh Zayed Stadium Nursery 1, Abu Dhabi	Hong Kong by 53 runs
Match 24	18 November	B	Nepal	Paras Khadka	Scotland	Kyle Coetzer	ICC Academy Ground No. 2, Dubai	Scotland by 8 wickets
Match 25	19 November	A	Italy	Damian Crowley	Namibia	Sarel Burger	Sheikh Zayed Stadium Nursery 1, Abu Dhabi	Namibia by 3 wickets
Match 26	19 November	B	Denmark	Michael Pedersen	Netherlands	Peter Borren	ICC Academy Ground No. 2, Dubai	Netherlands by 7 wickets
Match 27	19 November	A	United Arab Emirates	Khurram Khan	Hong Kong	Jamie Atkinson	Sheikh Zayed Stadium, Abu Dhabi	United Arab Emirates by 7 wickets
Match 28	19 November	A	Canada	Ashish Bagai	Uganda	Davis Arinaitwe	Sheikh Zayed Stadium Nursery 1, Abu Dhabi	Canada by 44 runs
T20I 339	19 November	B	Kenya	Collins Obuya	Scotland	Kyle Coetzer	ICC Academy, Dubai	Kenya by 92 runs
Match 30	19 November	B	Nepal	Paras Khadka	Papua New Guinea	Chris Amini	Sharjah Cricket Stadium, Sharjah	Nepal by 7 wickets
Match 31	20 November	A	Ireland	William Porterfield	United States	Neil McGarrell	Sheikh Zayed Stadium, Abu Dhabi	Ireland by 75 runs
Match 32	20 November	B	Afghanistan	Mohammad Nabi	Bermuda	Janeiro Tucker	ICC Academy, Dubai	Afghanistan by 8 wickets
Match 33	20 November	A	Hong Kong	Jamie Atkinson	Namibia	Sarel Burger	Sheikh Zayed Stadium Nursery 2, Abu Dhabi	Hong Kong by 8 wickets
Match 34	20 November	B	Netherlands	Peter Borren	Nepal	Paras Khadka	Sharjah Cricket Stadium, Sharjah	Netherlands by 5 wickets
Match 35	21 November	A	Ireland	William Porterfield	Italy	Damian Crowley	Sheikh Zayed Stadium Nursery 1, Abu Dhabi	Match abandoned
Match 36	21 November	B	Scotland	Kyle Coetzer	Papua New Guinea	Chris Amini	ICC Academy, Dubai	Scotland by 84 runs
Match 37	21 November	B	Afghanistan	Mohammad Nabi	Denmark	Michael Pedersen	ICC Academy Ground No. 2, Dubai	Afghanistan by 2 wickets
Match 38	21 November	A	Uganda	Davis Arinaitwe	United States	Neil McGarrell	Sheikh Zayed Stadium Nursery 2, Abu Dhabi	Match abandoned
Match 39	21 November	B	Bermuda	Janeiro Tucker	Kenya	Collins Obuya	ICC Academy Ground No. 2, Dubai	Kenya by 7 wickets
Match 40	22 November	A	United Arab Emirates	Khurram Khan	Canada	Ashish Bagai	Sheikh Zayed Stadium, Abu Dhabi	United Arab Emirates by 36 runs
T20I 342	22 November	B	Netherlands	Peter Borren	Scotland	Kyle Coetzer	ICC Academy, Dubai	Scotland by 15 runs
Match 42	22 November	B	Denmark	Michael Pedersen	Papua New Guinea	Chris Amini	Sharjah Cricket Stadium, Sharjah	Match abandoned
Match 43	22 November	A	Ireland	William Porterfield	Uganda	Davis Arinaitwe	Sheikh Zayed Stadium, Abu Dhabi	Ireland by 48 runs
Match 44	22 November	A	Hong Kong	Jamie Atkinson	United States	Neil McGarrell	Sheikh Zayed Stadium Nursery 2, Abu Dhabi	Hong Kong by 67 runs
Match 45	22 November	B	Afghanistan	Mohammad Nabi	Nepal	Paras Khadka	Sharjah Cricket Stadium, Sharjah	Afghanistan by 9 wickets
Match 46	23 November	A	Canada	Ashish Bagai	Namibia	Sarel Burger	Sheikh Zayed Stadium Nursery 1, Abu Dhabi	Namibia by 7 wickets
T20I 344	23 November	B	Kenya	Collins Obuya	Netherlands	Peter Borren	ICC Academy, Dubai	Netherlands by 29 runs
Match 48	23 November	A	United Arab Emirates	Khurram Khan	Italy	Damian Crowley	Sheikh Zayed Stadium Nursery 2, Abu Dhabi	Italy by 67 runs
Match 49	23 November	B	Bermuda	Janeiro Tucker	Nepal	Paras Khadka	ICC Academy, Dubai	Nepal by 21 runs
Match 50	24 November	A	Canada	Ashish Bagai	Italy	Damian Crowley	Sheikh Zayed Stadium, Abu Dhabi	Canada by 5 wickets
Match 51	24 November	A	Namibia	Sarel Burger	Uganda	Davis Arinaitwe	Sheikh Zayed Stadium Nursery 1, Abu Dhabi	Namibia by 38 runs
Match 52	24 November	B	Denmark	Michael Pedersen	Scotland	Kyle Coetzer	ICC Academy Ground No. 2, Dubai	Scotland by 75 runs
Match 53	24 November	A	Hong Kong	Jamie Atkinson	Ireland	William Porterfield	Sheikh Zayed Stadium, Abu Dhabi	Ireland by 85 runs
Match 54	24 November	A	United Arab Emirates	Khurram Khan	United States	Neil McGarrell	Sheikh Zayed Stadium Nursery 1, Abu Dhabi	United Arab Emirates by 14 runs
Match 55	24 November	B	Bermuda	Janeiro Tucker	Papua New Guinea	Chris Amini	ICC Academy Ground No. 2, Dubai	Papua New Guinea by 25 runs
T20I 345	24 November	B	Afghanistan	Mohammad Nabi	Kenya	Collins Obuya	Sharjah Cricket Stadium, Sharjah	Afghanistan by 34 runs
15th place playoff
15th place playoff	26 November		United States	Neil McGarrell	Denmark	Michael Pedersen	Sharjah Cricket Stadium, Sharjah	United States by 21 runs
13th place playoff
13th place playoff	26 November		Uganda	Davis Arinaitwe	Bermuda	Janeiro Tucker	ICC Academy Ground No. 2, Dubai	Uganda by 11 runs
11th place playoff
T20I 346	26 November		Canada	Ashish Bagai	Kenya	Collins Obuya	Sharjah Cricket Stadium, Sharjah	Kenya by 21 runs
Quarterfinals
Match 60	27 November		Netherlands	Peter Borren	United Arab Emirates	Khurram Khan	Sheikh Zayed Stadium, Abu Dhabi	United Arab Emirates by 10 runs
Match 61	27 November		Namibia	Sarel Burger	Papua New Guinea	Chris Amini	Sheikh Zayed Stadium Nursery 1, Abu Dhabi	Papua New Guineaby 25 runs
Match 62	27 November		Scotland	Kyle Coetzer	Italy	Damian Crowley	Sheikh Zayed Stadium Nursery 2, Abu Dhabi	Scotland by 7 wickets
Match 63	27 November		Hong Kong	Jamie Atkinson	Nepal	Paras Khadka	Sheikh Zayed Stadium, Abu Dhabi	Nepal by 5 wickets
9th place playoff
9th place playoff	28 November		Namibia	Sarel Burger	Italy	Damian Crowley	Sheikh Zayed Stadium Nursery 2, Abu Dhabi	Italy by 25 runs
5th place playoff
Semi-final 1	28 November		Hong Kong	Jamie Atkinson	Papua New Guinea	Chris Amini	Sheikh Zayed Stadium, Abu Dhabi	Hong Kong by 29 runs
T20I 347	28 November		Netherlands	Peter Borren	Scotland	Kyle Coetzer	Sheikh Zayed Stadium, Abu Dhabi	Netherlands by 8 wickets
7th place playoff	29 November		Scotland	Kyle Coetzer	Papua New Guinea	Chris Amini	Sheikh Zayed Stadium Nursery 1, Abu Dhabi	Scotland by 5 wickets
5th place playoff	29 November		Netherlands	Peter Borren	Hong Kong	Jamie Atkinson	Sheikh Zayed Stadium, Abu Dhabi	Netherlands by 7 wickets
1st place playoff
Semi-final	29 November		Afghanistan	Mohammad Nabi	Nepal	Paras Khadka	Sheikh Zayed Stadium Nursery 1, Abu Dhabi	Afghanistan by 7 wickets
Semi-final	29 November		Ireland	William Porterfield	United Arab Emirates	Khurram Khan	Sheikh Zayed Stadium, Abu Dhabi	Ireland by 62 runs
3rd place playoff	30 November		Nepal	Paras Khadka	United Arab Emirates	Khurram Khan	Sheikh Zayed Stadium, Abu Dhabi	Nepal by 5 wickets
T20 348	30 November		Afghanistan	Mohammad Nabi	Ireland	William Porterfield	Sheikh Zayed Stadium, Abu Dhabi	Ireland by 68 runs

==== Final standings ====
Position	Team	Status
1st	Ireland	Qualified for the 2014 ICC World Twenty20
2nd	Afghanistan	Qualified for the 2014 ICC World Twenty20
3rd	Nepal	Qualified for the 2014 ICC World Twenty20
4th	United Arab Emirates	Qualified for the 2014 ICC World Twenty20
5th	Netherlands	Qualified for the 2014 ICC World Twenty20
6th	Hong Kong	Qualified for the 2014 ICC World Twenty20
7th	Scotland	
8th	Papua New Guinea	
9th	Italy	
10th	Namibia	
11th	Kenya	
12th	Canada	
13th	Uganda	
14th	Bermuda	
15th	United States	
16th	Denmark	

=== Pakistan in South Africa ===
T20I series
No.	Date	Home captain	Away captain	Venue	Result
T20I 340	20 November	Faf du Plessis	Mohammad Hafeez	New Wanderers Stadium, Johannesburg	South Africa by 4 runs (D/L)
T20I 343	22 November	Faf du Plessis	Mohammad Hafeez	Newlands, Cape Town	Pakistan by 6 runs
ODI series
No.	Date	Home captain	Away captain	Venue	Result
ODI 3438	24 November	AB de Villiers	Misbah-ul-Haq	Newlands, Cape Town	Pakistan by 23 runs
ODI 3440	27 November	AB de Villiers	Misbah-ul-Haq	St George's Park, Port Elizabeth	Pakistan by 1 run
ODI 3441	30 November	AB de Villiers	Misbah-ul-Haq	SuperSport Park, Centurion	South Africa by 4 wickets

=== England in Australia ===
Test series
No.	Date	Home captain	Away captain	Venue	Result
Test 2103	21–25 November	Michael Clarke	Alastair Cook	The Gabba, Brisbane	Australia by 381 runs
Test 2105	5–9 December	Michael Clarke	Alastair Cook	Adelaide Oval, Adelaide	Australia by 218 runs
Test 2107	13–17 December	Michael Clarke	Alastair Cook	WACA Ground, Perth	Australia by 150 runs
Test 2110	26–30 December	Michael Clarke	Alastair Cook	Melbourne Cricket Ground, Melbourne	Australia by 8 wickets
Test 2113	3–7 January	Michael Clarke	Alastair Cook	Sydney Cricket Ground, Sydney	Australia by 281 runs
ODI series
No.	Date	Home captain	Away captain	Venue	Result
ODI 3454	12 January	Michael Clarke	Alastair Cook	Melbourne Cricket Ground, Melbourne	Australia by 6 wickets
ODI 3455	17 January	Michael Clarke	Alastair Cook	The Gabba, Brisbane	Australia by 1 wicket
ODI 3457	19 January	Michael Clarke	Alastair Cook	Sydney Cricket Ground, Sydney	Australia by 7 wickets
ODI 3461	24 January	George Bailey	Alastair Cook	WACA Ground, Perth	England by 57 runs
ODI 3463	26 January	Michael Clarke	Alastair Cook	Adelaide Oval, Adelaide	Australia by 5 runs
T20I series
No.	Date	Home captain	Away captain	Venue	Result
T20I 354	29 January	George Bailey	Stuart Broad	Bellerive Oval, Hobart	Australia by 13 runs
T20I 355	31 January	George Bailey	Stuart Broad	Melbourne Cricket Ground, Melbourne	Australia by 8 wickets
T20I 356	2 February	George Bailey	Stuart Broad	Stadium Australia, Sydney	Australia by 84 runs

== December ==
=== West Indies in New Zealand ===
Test series
No.	Date	Home captain	Away captain	Venue	Result
Test 2104	3–7 December	Brendon McCullum	Darren Sammy	University Oval, Dunedin	Match drawn
Test 2106	11–15 December	Brendon McCullum	Darren Sammy	Basin Reserve, Wellington	New Zealand by an innings and 73 runs
Test 2109	19–23 December	Brendon McCullum	Darren Sammy	Seddon Park, Hamilton	New Zealand by 8 wickets
ODI series
No.	Date	Home captain	Away captain	Venue	Result
ODI 3449	26 December	Brendon McCullum	Dwayne Bravo	Eden Park, Auckland	West Indies by 2 wickets
ODI 3450a	29 December	Brendon McCullum	Dwayne Bravo	McLean Park, Napier	Match abandoned
ODI 3451	1 January	Brendon McCullum	Dwayne Bravo	Queenstown Events Centre, Queenstown	New Zealand by 159 runs
ODI 3452	4 January	Brendon McCullum	Dwayne Bravo	Saxton Oval, Nelson	New Zealand by 58 runs (D/L)
ODI 3453	8 January	Brendon McCullum	Dwayne Bravo	Seddon Park, Hamilton	West Indies by 203 runs
T20I series
No.	Date	Home captain	Away captain	Venue	Result
T20I 352	11 January	Brendon McCullum	Dwayne Bravo	Eden Park, Auckland	New Zealand by 81 runs
T20I 353	15 January	Brendon McCullum	Dwayne Bravo	Westpac Stadium, Wellington	New Zealand by 4 wickets

=== India in South Africa ===
ODI series
No.	Date	Home captain	Away captain	Venue	Result
ODI 3442	5 December	AB de Villiers	Mahendra Singh Dhoni	New Wanderers Stadium, Johannesburg	South Africa by 141 runs
ODI 3443	8 December	AB de Villiers	Mahendra Singh Dhoni	Kingsmead, Durban	South Africa by 134 runs
ODI 3444	11 December	AB de Villiers	Mahendra Singh Dhoni	SuperSport Park, Centurion	No result
Test series
No.	Date	Home captain	Away captain	Venue	Result
Test 2108	18–22 December	Graeme Smith	Mahendra Singh Dhoni	New Wanderers Stadium, Johannesburg	Match drawn
Test 2111	26–30 December	Graeme Smith	Mahendra Singh Dhoni	Kingsmead, Durban	South Africa by 10 wickets

=== Pakistan vs Afghanistan in the United Arab Emirates ===
Only T20I
No.	Date	Home captain	Away captain	Venue	Result
T20I 349	8 December	Mohammad Hafeez	Mohammad Nabi	Sharjah Cricket Stadium, Sharjah	Pakistan by 6 wickets

=== 2011–13 ICC Intercontinental Cup Final ===
First-class
No.	Date	Team 1	Captain 1	Team 2	Captain 2	Venue	Result
First-class	10–13 December	Afghanistan	Mohammad Nabi	Ireland	William Porterfield	ICC Academy, Dubai	Ireland by 122 runs

=== Pakistan vs Sri Lanka in the United Arab Emirates ===
T20I series
No.	Date	Home captain	Away captain	Venue	Result
T20I 350	11 December	Mohammad Hafeez	Dinesh Chandimal	DSC Cricket Stadium, Dubai	Pakistan by 3 wickets
T20I 351	13 December	Mohammad Hafeez	Dinesh Chandimal	DSC Cricket Stadium, Dubai	Sri Lanka by 24 runs
ODI series
No.	Date	Home captain	Away captain	Venue	Result
ODI 3445	18 December	Misbah-ul-Haq	Angelo Mathews	Sharjah Cricket Stadium, Sharjah	Pakistan by 11 runs
ODI 3446	20 December	Misbah-ul-Haq	Angelo Mathews	DSC Cricket Stadium, Dubai	Sri Lanka by 2 wickets
ODI 3447	22 December	Misbah-ul-Haq	Angelo Mathews	Sharjah Cricket Stadium, Sharjah	Pakistan by 113 runs
ODI 3448	25 December	Misbah-ul-Haq	Angelo Mathews	Sheikh Zayed Stadium, Abu Dhabi	Pakistan by 8 wickets
ODI 3450	27 December	Misbah-ul-Haq	Angelo Mathews	Sheikh Zayed Stadium, Abu Dhabi	Sri Lanka by 2 wickets
Test series
No.	Date	Home captain	Away captain	Venue	Result
Test 2112	31 December – 4 January	Misbah-ul-Haq	Angelo Mathews	Sheikh Zayed Stadium, Abu Dhabi	Match drawn
Test 2114	8–12 January	Misbah-ul-Haq	Angelo Mathews	DSC Cricket Stadium, Dubai	Sri Lanka by 9 wickets
Test 2115	16–20 January	Misbah-ul-Haq	Angelo Mathews	Sharjah Cricket Stadium, Sharjah	Pakistan by 5 wickets

== January ==
=== English women in Australia ===
Test series
No.	Date	Home captain	Away captain	Venue	Result
WTest 135	10–13 January	Jodie Fields	Charlotte Edwards	WACA Ground, Perth	England won by 61 runs
WODI series
No.	Date	Home captain	Away captain	Venue	Result
WODI 902	19 January	Meg Lanning	Charlotte Edwards	Melbourne Cricket Ground, Melbourne	England by 7 wickets
WODI 905	23 January	Meg Lanning	Charlotte Edwards	Melbourne Cricket Ground, Melbourne	Australia by 26 runs
WODI 907	26 January	Meg Lanning	Charlotte Edwards	Bellerive Oval, Hobart	Australia by 4 wickets
WT20I series
No.	Date	Home captain	Away captain	Venue	Result
WT20I 234	29 January	Meg Lanning	Charlotte Edwards	Bellerive Oval, Hobart	England by 9 wickets
WT20I 235	31 January	Meg Lanning	Charlotte Edwards	Melbourne Cricket Ground, Melbourne	Australia by 7 wickets
WT20I 236	2 February	Meg Lanning	Charlotte Edwards	Stadium Australia, Sydney	Australia by 7 wickets

=== Cricket World Cup Qualifier ===
==== Group stage ====
Group A
Pos	Team	Pld	W	L	NR	Pts	NRR
1	Scotland	4	3	1	0	6	1.663
2	Hong Kong	4	3	1	0	6	1.069
3	United Arab Emirates	4	3	1	0	6	0.848
4	Canada	4	1	3	0	2	−2.066
5	Nepal	4	0	4	0	0	−1.567

Group B
Pos	Team	Pld	W	L	NR	Pts	NRR
1	Papua New Guinea	4	3	1	0	6	1.095
2	Namibia	4	3	1	0	6	0.574
3	Kenya	4	2	2	0	4	0.401
4	Netherlands	4	2	2	0	4	0.370
5	Uganda	4	0	4	0	0	−2.259

Team qualified for Super Six

Group stage
No.	Date	Group	Team 1	Captain 1	Team 2	Captain 2	Venue	Result
Match 1	13 January	B	Netherlands	Peter Borren	Uganda	Davis Arinaitwe	Bay Oval, Mount Maunganui	Netherlands by 7 wickets
Match 2	13 January	B	Kenya	Rakep Patel	Papua New Guinea	Chris Amini	Pukekura Park, New Plymouth	Papua New Guinea by 8 wickets
Match 3	13 January	A	Nepal	Paras Khadka	United Arab Emirates	Khurram Khan	Mainpower Oval, Rangiora	United Arab Emirates by 102 runs
Match 4	13 January	A	Hong Kong	Jamie Atkinson	Scotland	Kyle Coetzer	Queenstown Events Centre, Queenstown	Hong Kong by 17 runs
Match 5	15 January	B	Namibia	Sarel Burger	Netherlands	Peter Borren	Bay Oval No.2, Mount Maunganui	Namibia by 91 runs
Match 6	15 January	A	Canada	Jimmy Hansra	United Arab Emirates	Khurram Khan	Mainpower Oval, Rangiora	United Arab Emirates by 80 runs
Match 7	16 January	B	Uganda	Davis Arinaitwe	Papua New Guinea	Chris Amini	Pukekura Park, New Plymouth	Papua New Guinea by 9 wickets
Match 8	16 January	A	Nepal	Gyanendra Malla	Scotland	Kyle Coetzer	Queenstown Events Centre, Queenstown	Scotland by 90 runs
Match 9	17 January	B	Kenya	Rakep Patel	Namibia	Sarel Burger	Bay Oval, Mount Maunganui	Namibia by 2 wickets
Match 10	17 January	A	Canada	Jimmy Hansra	Hong Kong	Jamie Atkinson	Mainpower Oval, Rangiora	Hong Kong by 9 wickets
Match 11	19 January	B	Kenya	Rakep Patel	Uganda	Davis Arinaitwe	Bay Oval No.2, Mount Maunganui	Kenya by 47 runs
Match 12	19 January	B	Netherlands	Peter Borren	Papua New Guinea	Chris Amini	Pukekura Park, New Plymouth	Netherlands by 130 runs
Match 13	19 January	A	Hong Kong	Irfan Ahmed	Nepal	Paras Khadka	Mainpower Oval, Rangiora	Hong Kong by 10 wickets
Match 14	19 January	A	Scotland	Preston Mommsen	United Arab Emirates	Khurram Khan	Queenstown Events Centre, Queenstown	Scotland by 53 runs
Match 15	21 January	B	Namibia	Stephan Baard	Uganda	Davis Arinaitwe	Bay Oval, Mount Maunganui	Namibia by 100 runs
Match 16	21 January	A	Canada	Jimmy Hansra	Nepal	Paras Khadka	Hagley Oval, Christchurch	Canada by 12 runs
Match 17	23 January	B	Namibia	Sarel Burger	Papua New Guinea	Chris Amini	Bay Oval No2, Mount Maunganui	Papua New Guinea by 8 wickets
ODI 3459	23 January	A	Canada	Jimmy Hansra	Scotland	Preston Mommsen	Hagley Oval, Christchurch	Scotland by 170 runs
ODI 3460	23 January	B	Kenya	Rakep Patel	Netherlands	Peter Borren	Bert Sutcliffe Oval, Lincoln	Kenya by 4 wickets
Match 20	23 January	A	Hong Kong	Jamie Atkinson	United Arab Emirates	Khurram Khan	Queenstown Events Centre, Queenstown	United Arab Emirates by 22 runs

==== Playoffs ====
7th and 9th Place Playoffs
No.	Date	Team 1	Captain 1	Team 2	Captain 2	Venue	Result
1st play-off	26 January	Netherlands	Peter Borren	Nepal	Paras Khadka	Bay Oval, Mount Maunganui	Netherlands by 7 wickets
2nd play-off	26 January	Canada	Jimmy Hansra	Uganda	Davis Arinaitwe	Bay Oval No.2, Mount Maunganui	Canada by 59 runs (D/L)
7th place play-off
ODI 3464	28 January	Netherlands	Peter Borren	Canada	Jimmy Hansra	Bay Oval, Mount Maunganui	Netherlands by 8 wickets
9th place play-off
9th place play-off	28 January	Nepal	Paras Khadka	Uganda	Davis Arinaitwe	Bay Oval No.2, Mount Maunganui	Nepal by 160 runs

==== Super Sixes ====
Pos	Team	Pld	W	L	NR	Pts	NRR
1	United Arab Emirates	5	4	1	0	8	0.737
2	Scotland	5	4	1	0	8	0.495
3	Hong Kong	5	3	2	0	6	0.568
4	Papua New Guinea	5	2	3	0	4	−0.495
5	Kenya	5	1	4	0	2	−0.201
6	Namibia	5	1	4	0	2	−1.035

Fixtures
No.	Date	Team 1	Captain 1	Team 2	Captain 2	Venue	Result
Match 23	26 January	Scotland	Preston Mommsen	Namibia	Sarel Burger	Bert Sutcliffe Oval, Lincoln	Scotland by 21 runs
Match 24	26 January	Papua New Guinea	Chris Amini	United Arab Emirates	Khurram Khan	Hagley Oval, Christchurch	United Arab Emirates by 150 runs
Match 25	26 January	Hong Kong	Jamie Atkinson	Kenya	Rakep Patel	Mainpower Oval, Rangiora	Kenya by 10 runs (D/L)
Match 28	28 January	Hong Kong	Jamie Atkinson	Namibia	Sarel Burger	Mainpower Oval, Rangiora	Hong Kong by 76 runs
Match 29	28 January	United Arab Emirates	Khurram Khan	Kenya	Rakep Patel	Hagley Oval, Christchurch	United Arab Emirates by 13 runs
Match 30	28 January	Scotland	Preston Mommsen	Papua New Guinea	Chris Amini	Bert Sutcliffe Oval, Lincoln	Scotland by 52 runs
Match 31	30 January	Namibia	Sarel Burger	United Arab Emirates	Khurram Khan	Mainpower Oval, Rangiora	United Arab Emirates by 36 runs
ODI 3466	30 January	Scotland	Preston Mommsen	Kenya	Rakep Patel	Hagley Oval, Christchurch	Scotland by 3 wickets
Match 33	30 January	Papua New Guinea	Chris Amini	Hong Kong	Jamie Atkinson	Bert Sutcliffe Oval, Lincoln	Hong Kong by 3 wickets
ODI 3468	1 February	United Arab Emirates	Khurram Khan	Scotland	Preston Mommsen	Bert Sutcliffe Oval, Lincoln	Scotland by 41 runs

===== Final Placings =====
Pos	Team	Status
1st	Scotland	Team qualifies for 2015 Cricket World Cup and has ODI status until 2018.
2nd	United Arab Emirates	Team qualifies for 2015 Cricket World Cup and has ODI status until 2018.
3rd	Hong Kong	Team has ODI status until 2018.
4th	Papua New Guinea	Team has ODI status until 2018.
5th	Kenya	Team does not have ODI status until 2018.
6th	Namibia	Team does not have ODI status until 2018.
7th	Netherlands	Team does not have ODI status until 2018.
8th	Canada	Team does not have ODI status until 2018.
9th	Nepal	Team does not have ODI status until 2018.
10th	Uganda	Team does not have ODI status until 2018.

=== Sri Lanka women in India ===
WODI series
No.	Date	Home captain	Away captain	Venue	Result
WODI 903	19 January	Mithali Raj	Shashikala Siriwardene	Dr. Y. S. Rajasekhara Reddy ACA–VDCA Cricket Stadium, Visakhapatnam	India by 7 wickets
WODI 904	21 January	Mithali Raj	Shashikala Siriwardene	Dr. Y. S. Rajasekhara Reddy ACA–VDCA Cricket Stadium, Visakhapatnam	India by 7 wickets
WODI 906	23 January	Mithali Raj	Shashikala Siriwardene	Dr. Y. S. Rajasekhara Reddy ACA–VDCA Cricket Stadium, Visakhapatnam	India by 95 runs
WT20I series
No.	Date	Home captain	Away captain	Venue	Result
WT20I 231	25 January	Mithali Raj	Shashikala Siriwardene	Dr PVG Raju ACA Sports Complex, Vizianagaram	Sri Lanka by 3 wickets
WT20I 232	26 January	Mithali Raj	Shashikala Siriwardene	Dr PVG Raju ACA Sports Complex, Vizianagaram	India by 9 runs
WT20I 233	28 January	Mithali Raj	Shashikala Siriwardene	Dr. Y. S. Rajasekhara Reddy ACA–VDCA Cricket Stadium, Visakhapatnam	Sri Lanka by 6 wickets

=== India in New Zealand ===
ODI series
No.	Date	Home captain	Away captain	Venue	Result
ODI 3456	19 January	Brendon McCullum	Mahendra Singh Dhoni	McLean Park, Napier	New Zealand by 24 runs
ODI 3458	22 January	Brendon McCullum	Mahendra Singh Dhoni	Seddon Park, Hamilton	New Zealand by 15 runs (D/L)
ODI 3462	25 January	Brendon McCullum	Mahendra Singh Dhoni	Eden Park, Auckland	Match tied
ODI 3465	28 January	Brendon McCullum	Mahendra Singh Dhoni	Seddon Park, Hamilton	New Zealand by 7 wickets
ODI 3467	31 January	Brendon McCullum	Mahendra Singh Dhoni	Westpac Stadium, Wellington	New Zealand by 87 runs
Test series
No.	Date	Home captain	Away captain	Venue	Result
Test 2118	6–10 February	Brendon McCullum	Mahendra Singh Dhoni	Eden Park, Auckland	New Zealand by 40 runs
Test 2120	14–18 February	Brendon McCullum	Mahendra Singh Dhoni	Basin Reserve, Wellington	Match drawn

=== Sri Lanka in Bangladesh ===
Test series
No.	Date	Home captain	Away captain	Venue	Result
Test 2116	27–31 January	Mushfiqur Rahim	Angelo Mathews	Sher-e-Bangla National Stadium, Mirpur	Sri Lanka by an innings and 248 runs
Test 2117	4–8 February	Mushfiqur Rahim	Angelo Mathews	Zahur Ahmed Chowdhury Stadium, Chittagong	Match drawn
T20I series
No.	Date	Home captain	Away captain	Venue	Result
T20I 357	12 February	Mashrafe Mortaza	Dinesh Chandimal	Zahur Ahmed Chowdhury Stadium, Chittagong	Sri Lanka by 2 runs
T20I 358	14 February	Mashrafe Mortaza	Dinesh Chandimal	Zahur Ahmed Chowdhury Stadium, Chittagong	Sri Lanka by 3 wickets
ODI series
No.	Date	Home captain	Away captain	Venue	Result
ODI 3469	17 February	Mushfiqur Rahim	Angelo Mathews	Sher-e-Bangla National Stadium, Mirpur	Sri Lanka by 13 runs
ODI 3470	20 February	Mushfiqur Rahim	Angelo Mathews	Sher-e-Bangla National Stadium, Mirpur	Sri Lanka by 61 runs
ODI 3471	22 February	Mushfiqur Rahim	Angelo Mathews	Sher-e-Bangla National Stadium, Mirpur	Sri Lanka by 6 wickets

== February ==
=== Australia in South Africa ===
Test series
No.	Date	Home captain	Away captain	Venue	Result
Test 2119	12–16 February	Graeme Smith	Michael Clarke	SuperSport Park, Centurion	Australia by 281 runs
Test 2121	20–24 February	Graeme Smith	Michael Clarke	St George's Park, Port Elizabeth	South Africa by 231 runs
Test 2122	1–5 March	Graeme Smith	Michael Clarke	Newlands, Cape Town	Australia by 245 runs
T20I series
No.	Date	Home captain	Away captain	Venue	Result
T20I 360a	9 March	Faf du Plessis	George Bailey	St George's Park, Port Elizabeth	Match abandoned
T20I 363	12 March	Faf du Plessis	George Bailey	Kingsmead, Durban	Australia by 5 wickets
T20I 365	14 March	Faf du Plessis	George Bailey	SuperSport Park, Centurion	Australia by 6 wickets

=== Ireland in the West Indies ===
T20I series
No.	Date	Home captain	Away captain	Venue	Result
T20I 359	19 February	Darren Sammy	William Porterfield	Sabina Park, Kingston, Jamaica	Ireland by 6 wickets
T20I 360	21 February	Darren Sammy	William Porterfield	Sabina Park, Kingston, Jamaica	West Indies by 11 runs
Only ODI
No.	Date	Home captain	Away captain	Venue	Result
ODI 3472	23 February	Dwayne Bravo	William Porterfield	Sabina Park, Kingston, Jamaica	West Indies by 4 wickets

=== West Indies women in New Zealand ===
WODI series
No.	Date	Home captain	Away captain	Venue	Result
WODI 908	22 February	Suzie Bates	Merissa Aguilleira	Bert Sutcliffe Oval, Lincoln	New Zealand by 9 wickets
WODI 909	24 February	Suzie Bates	Merissa Aguilleira	Bert Sutcliffe Oval, Lincoln	New Zealand by 94 runs
WODI 910	26 February	Suzie Bates	Merissa Aguilleira	Bert Sutcliffe Oval, Lincoln	New Zealand by 107 runs
WT20I series
No.	Date	Home captain	Away captain	Venue	Result
WT20I 237	1 March	Suzie Bates	Merissa Aguilleira	Queens Park, Invercargill	New Zealand by 32 runs
WT20I 238	2 March	Suzie Bates	Merissa Aguilleira	Queens Park, Invercargill	No Result
WT20I 239	5 March	Suzie Bates	Merissa Aguilleira	Queens Park, Invercargill	New Zealand by 24 runs
WT20I 240	8 March	Suzie Bates	Merissa Aguilleira	Bay Oval, Mount Maunganui	New Zealand by 8 wickets
WT20I 242	9 March	Suzie Bates	Merissa Aguilleira	Bay Oval, Mount Maunganui	New Zealand by 34 runs

=== Asia Cup ===
Pos	Team	Pld	W	L	T	NR	BP	Pts	NRR
1	Sri Lanka	4	4	0	0	0	1	9	0.773
2	Pakistan	4	3	1	0	0	1	7	0.349
3	India	4	2	2	0	0	1	5	0.450
4	Afghanistan	4	1	3	0	0	0	2	−1.278
5	Bangladesh	4	0	4	0	0	0	0	−0.259

Source: Cricinfo

No.	Date	Team 1	Captain 1	Team 2	Captain 2	Venue	Result
Group stage
ODI 3473	25 February	Pakistan	Misbah-ul-Haq	Sri Lanka	Angelo Mathews	Khan Shaheb Osman Ali Stadium, Fatullah	Sri Lanka by 12 runs
ODI 3474	26 February	Bangladesh	Mushfiqur Rahim	India	Virat Kohli	Khan Shaheb Osman Ali Stadium, Fatullah	India by 6 wickets
ODI 3475	27 February	Afghanistan	Mohammad Nabi	Pakistan	Misbah-ul-Haq	Khan Shaheb Osman Ali Stadium, Fatullah	Pakistan by 72 runs
ODI 3476	28 February	India	Virat Kohli	Sri Lanka	Angelo Mathews	Khan Shaheb Osman Ali Stadium, Fatullah	Sri Lanka by 2 wickets
ODI 3478	1 March	Bangladesh	Mushfiqur Rahim	Afghanistan	Mohammad Nabi	Khan Shaheb Osman Ali Stadium, Fatullah	Afghanistan by 32 runs
ODI 3479	2 March	India	Virat Kohli	Pakistan	Misbah-ul-Haq	Sher-e-Bangla National Stadium, Mirpur	Pakistan by 1 wicket
ODI 3481	3 March	Afghanistan	Mohammad Nabi	Sri Lanka	Angelo Mathews	Sher-e-Bangla National Stadium, Mirpur	Sri Lanka by 129 runs
ODI 3482	4 March	Bangladesh	Mushfiqur Rahim	Pakistan	Misbah-ul-Haq	Sher-e-Bangla National Stadium, Mirpur	Pakistan by 3 wickets
ODI 3483	5 March	Afghanistan	Mohammad Nabi	India	Virat Kohli	Sher-e-Bangla National Stadium, Mirpur	India by 8 wickets
ODI 3485	6 March	Bangladesh	Mushfiqur Rahim	Sri Lanka	Angelo Mathews	Sher-e-Bangla National Stadium, Mirpur	Sri Lanka by 3 wickets
Final
ODI 3486	8 March	Pakistan	Misbah-ul-Haq	Sri Lanka	Angelo Mathews	Sher-e-Bangla National Stadium, Mirpur	Sri Lanka by 5 wickets

=== England in the West Indies ===
ODI series
No.	Date	Home captain	Away captain	Venue	Result
ODI 3477	28 February	Dwayne Bravo	Stuart Broad	Sir Vivian Richards Stadium, North Sound, Antigua	West Indies by 15 runs
ODI 3480	2 March	Dwayne Bravo	Stuart Broad	Sir Vivian Richards Stadium, North Sound, Antigua	England by 3 wickets
ODI 3484	5 March	Dwayne Bravo	Stuart Broad	Sir Vivian Richards Stadium, North Sound, Antigua	England by 25 runs
T20I series
No.	Date	Home captain	Away captain	Venue	Result
T20I 361	9 March	Darren Sammy	Stuart Broad	Kensington Oval, Bridgetown, Barbados	West Indies by 27 runs
T20I 362	11 March	Darren Sammy	Eoin Morgan	Kensington Oval, Bridgetown, Barbados	West Indies by 5 wickets
T20I 364	13 March	Darren Sammy	Eoin Morgan	Kensington Oval, Bridgetown, Barbados	England by 5 runs

== March ==
=== World Cricket League Division Five ===
Pos	Team	Pld	W	L	T	NR	Pts	NRR
1	Jersey	5	5	0	0	0	10	1.311
2	Malaysia	5	4	1	0	0	8	2.151
3	Tanzania	5	3	2	0	0	6	−0.616
4	Nigeria	5	2	3	0	0	4	−0.626
5	Cayman Islands	5	1	4	0	0	2	−1.425
6	Guernsey	5	0	5	0	0	0	−0.626

Group stage
No.	Date	Team 1	Captain 1	Team 2	Captain 2	Venue	Result
Match 1	6 March	Cayman Islands	Ronald Ebanks	Guernsey	Jamie Nussbaumer	Royal Selangor Club, Kuala Lumpur	Cayman Islands by 33 runs
Match 2	6 March	Malaysia	Ahmed Faiz	Tanzania	Hamisi Abdallah	Kinrara Academy Oval, Kuala Lumpur	Malaysia by 122 runs
Match 3	6 March	Nigeria	Kunle Adegbola	Jersey	Peter Gough	Bayuemas Oval, Kuala Lumpur	Jersey by 60 runs
Match 4	7 March	Jersey	Peter Gough	Tanzania	Hamisi Abdallah	Kinrara Academy Oval, Kuala Lumpur	Jersey by 102 runs
Match 5	7 March	Malaysia	Ahmed Faiz	Cayman Islands	Ronald Ebanks	Bayuemas Oval, Kuala Lumpur	Malaysia by 213 runs
Match 6	7 March	Nigeria	Kunle Adegbola	Guernsey	Jamie Nussbaumer	Royal Selangor Club, Kuala Lumpur	Nigeria by 2 wickets
Match 7	9 March	Cayman Islands	Ronald Ebanks	Nigeria	Kunle Adegbola	Kinrara Academy Oval, Kuala Lumpur	Nigeria by 7 wickets
Match 8	9 March	Guernsey	Jamie Nussbaumer	Tanzania	Hamisi Abdallah	Bayuemas Oval, Kuala Lumpur	Tanzania by 48 runs
Match 9	9 March	Malaysia	Ahmed Faiz	Jersey	Peter Gough	Royal Selangor Club, Kuala Lumpur	Jersey by 8 wickets
Match 10	10 March	Cayman Islands	Ronald Ebanks	Jersey	Peter Gough	Bayuemas Oval, Kuala Lumpur	Jersey by 122 runs
Match 11	10 March	Malaysia	Ahmed Faiz	Guernsey	Jamie Nussbaumer	Kinrara Academy Oval, Kuala Lumpur	Malaysia by 63 runs
Match 12	10 March	Nigeria	Kunle Adegbola	Tanzania	Hamisi Abdallah	Royal Selangor Club, Kuala Lumpur	Tanzania by 10 runs
Match 13	12 March	Cayman Islands	Ronald Ebanks	Tanzania	Hamisi Abdallah	Royal Selangor Club, Kuala Lumpur	Tanzania by 12 runs
Match 14	12 March	Guernsey	Jamie Nussbaumer	Jersey	Peter Gough	Kinrara Academy Oval, Kuala Lumpur	Jersey by 1 wicket
Match 15	12 March	Malaysia	Ahmed Faiz	Nigeria	Kunle Adegbola	Bayuemas Oval, Kuala Lumpur	Malaysia by 9 wickets
Playoffs
No.	Date	Team 1	Captain 1	Team 2	Captain 2	Venue	Result
5th place playoff	13 March	Cayman Islands	Ronald Ebanks	Guernsey	Jamie Nussbaumer	Bayuemas Oval, Kuala Lumpur	Guernsey by 7 wickets
3rd place playoff	13 March	Tanzania	Hamisi Abdallah	Nigeria	Kunle Adegbola	Royal Selangor Club, Kuala Lumpur	Tanzania by 3 wickets
Final	13 March	Jersey	Peter Gough	Malaysia	Ahmed Faiz	Kinrara Academy Oval, Kuala Lumpur	Jersey by 71 runs

==== Final Placings ====
Pos	Team	Status
1st	Jersey	Promoted to 2014 Division Four
2nd	Malaysia	Promoted to 2014 Division Four
3rd	Tanzania	Remain in 2016 Division Five
4th	Nigeria	Remain in 2016 Division Five
5th	Guernsey	Relegated to 2015 Division Six
6th	Cayman Islands	Relegated to 2015 Division Six

=== Pakistan women in Bangladesh ===
WODI series
No.	Date	Home captain	Away captain	Venue	Result
WODI 911	4 March	Salma Khatun	Sana Mir	Sheikh Kamal International Stadium, Cox's Bazar, Cox's Bazar	Bangladesh by 43 runs
WODI 912	6 March	Salma Khatun	Sana Mir	Sheikh Kamal International Stadium, Cox's Bazar, Cox's Bazar	Bangladesh by 3 wickets
WT20I series
No.	Date	Home captain	Away captain	Venue	Result
WT20I 241	8 March	Salma Khatun	Sana Mir	Sheikh Kamal International Stadium, Cox's Bazar, Cox's Bazar	Pakistan by 13 runs
WT20I 246	15 March	Salma Khatun	Sana Mir	Sheikh Kamal International Stadium, Cox's Bazar, Cox's Bazar	Pakistan by 34 runs

=== India women in Bangladesh ===
WT20I series
No.	Date	Home captain	Away captain	Venue	Result
WT20I 243	9 March	Salma Khatun	Mithali Raj	Sheikh Kamal International Stadium, Cox's Bazar, Cox's Bazar	India by 16 runs
WT20I 244	11 March	Salma Khatun	Mithali Raj	Sheikh Kamal International Stadium, Cox's Bazar, Cox's Bazar	India by 8 wickets
WT20I 245	13 March	Salma Khatun	Mithali Raj	Sheikh Kamal International Stadium, Cox's Bazar, Cox's Bazar	India by 34 runs

=== ICC World Twenty20 ===
==== First round ====
Pos	Team	Pld	W	L	NR	Pts	NRR
1	Bangladesh	3	2	1	0	4	1.466
2	Nepal	3	2	1	0	4	0.933
3	Afghanistan	3	1	2	0	2	−0.981
4	Hong Kong	3	1	2	0	2	−1.455

Source: ESPN Cricinfo

Pos	Team	Pld	W	L	NR	Pts	NRR
1	Netherlands	3	2	1	0	4	1.109
2	Zimbabwe	3	2	1	0	4	0.957
3	Ireland	3	2	1	0	4	−0.701
4	United Arab Emirates	3	0	3	0	0	−1.541

Source: ESPN Cricinfo

Group stage
No.	Date	Group	Team 1	Captain 1	Team 2	Captain 2	Venue	Result
T20I 366	16 March	A	Bangladesh	Mushfiqur Rahim	Afghanistan	Mohammad Nabi	Sher-e-Bangla National Cricket Stadium, Dhaka	Bangladesh by 9 wickets
T20I 367	16 March	A	Hong Kong	Jamie Atkinson	Nepal	Paras Khadka	Zahur Ahmed Chowdhury Stadium, Chittagong	Nepal by 80 runs
T20I 368	17 March	B	Zimbabwe	Brendan Taylor	Ireland	William Porterfield	Sylhet International Cricket Stadium, Sylhet	Ireland by 3 wickets
T20I 369	17 March	B	Netherlands	Peter Borren	United Arab Emirates	Khurram Khan	Sylhet International Cricket Stadium, Sylhet	Netherlands by 6 wickets
T20I 370	18 March	A	Afghanistan	Mohammad Nabi	Hong Kong	Jamie Atkinson	Zahur Ahmed Chowdhury Stadium, Chittagong	Afghanistan by 7 wickets
T20I 371	18 March	A	Bangladesh	Mushfiqur Rahim	Nepal	Paras Khadka	Zahur Ahmed Chowdhury Stadium, Chittagong	Bangladesh by 8 wickets
T20I 372	19 March	B	Zimbabwe	Brendan Taylor	Netherlands	Peter Borren	Sylhet International Cricket Stadium, Sylhet	Zimbabwe by 5 wickets
T20I 373	19 March	B	Ireland	William Porterfield	United Arab Emirates	Khurram Khan	Sylhet International Cricket Stadium, Sylhet	Ireland by 21 runs (D/L)
T20I 374	20 March	A	Afghanistan	Mohammad Nabi	Nepal	Paras Khadka	Zahur Ahmed Chowdhury Stadium, Chittagong	Nepal by 9 runs
T20I 375	20 March	A	Bangladesh	Mushfiqur Rahim	Hong Kong	Jamie Atkinson	Zahur Ahmed Chowdhury Stadium, Chittagong	Hong Kong by 2 wickets
T20I 376	21 March	B	Zimbabwe	Brendan Taylor	United Arab Emirates	Khurram Khan	Sylhet International Cricket Stadium, Sylhet	Zimbabwe by 5 wickets
T20I 377	21 March	B	Ireland	William Porterfield	Netherlands	Peter Borren	Sylhet International Cricket Stadium, Sylhet	Netherlands by 6 wickets

==== Super 10 ====
Pos	Team	Pld	W	L	NR	Pts	NRR
1	Sri Lanka	4	3	1	0	6	2.233
2	South Africa	4	3	1	0	6	0.075
3	New Zealand	4	2	2	0	4	−0.678
4	England	4	1	3	0	2	−0.776
5	Netherlands	4	1	3	0	2	−0.866

Source: ESPN Cricinfo

Pos	Team	Pld	W	L	NR	Pts	NRR
1	India	4	4	0	0	8	1.280
2	West Indies	4	3	1	0	6	1.971
3	Pakistan	4	2	2	0	4	−0.384
4	Australia	4	1	3	0	2	−0.875
5	Bangladesh	4	0	4	0	0	−2.072

Source: ESPN Cricinfo

Super 10
No.	Date	Group	Team 1	Captain 1	Team 2	Captain 2	Venue	Result
T20I 378	21 March	2	India	Mahendra Singh Dhoni	Pakistan	Mohammad Hafeez	Sher-e-Bangla National Cricket Stadium, Dhaka	India by 7 wickets
T20I 379	22 March	1	South Africa	AB de Villiers	Sri Lanka	Dinesh Chandimal	Zahur Ahmed Chowdhury Stadium, Chittagong	Sri Lanka by 5 runs
T20I 380	22 March	1	England	Stuart Broad	New Zealand	Brendon McCullum	Zahur Ahmed Chowdhury Stadium, Chittagong	New Zealand by 9 runs (D/L)
T20I 381	23 March	2	Australia	George Bailey	Pakistan	Mohammad Hafeez	Sher-e-Bangla National Cricket Stadium, Dhaka	Pakistan by 16 runs
T20I 382	23 March	2	India	Mahendra Singh Dhoni	West Indies	Darren Sammy	Sher-e-Bangla National Cricket Stadium, Dhaka	India by 7 wickets
T20I 383	24 March	1	New Zealand	Brendon McCullum	South Africa	Faf du Plessis	Zahur Ahmed Chowdhury Stadium, Chittagong	South Africa by 2 runs
T20I 384	24 March	1	Sri Lanka	Dinesh Chandimal	Netherlands	Peter Borren	Zahur Ahmed Chowdhury Stadium, Chittagong	Sri Lanka by 9 wickets
T20I 385	25 March	2	West Indies	Darren Sammy	Bangladesh	Mushfiqur Rahim	Sher-e-Bangla National Cricket Stadium, Dhaka	West Indies by 73 runs
T20I 386	27 March	1	South Africa	Faf du Plessis	Netherlands	Peter Borren	Zahur Ahmed Chowdhury Stadium, Chittagong	South Africa by 6 runs
T20I 387	27 March	1	England	Stuart Broad	Sri Lanka	Dinesh Chandimal	Zahur Ahmed Chowdhury Stadium, Chittagong	England by 6 wickets
T20I 388	28 March	2	Australia	George Bailey	West Indies	Darren Sammy	Sher-e-Bangla National Cricket Stadium, Dhaka	West Indies by 6 wickets
T20I 389	28 March	2	India	Mahendra Singh Dhoni	Bangladesh	Mushfiqur Rahim	Sher-e-Bangla National Cricket Stadium, Dhaka	India by 8 wickets
T20I 390	29 March	1	New Zealand	Brendon McCullum	Netherlands	Peter Borren	Zahur Ahmed Chowdhury Stadium, Chittagong	New Zealand by 6 wickets
T20I 391	29 March	1	England	Stuart Broad	South Africa	AB de Villiers	Zahur Ahmed Chowdhury Stadium, Chittagong	South Africa by 3 runs
T20I 392	30 March	2	Pakistan	Mohammad Hafeez	Bangladesh	Mushfiqur Rahim	Sher-e-Bangla National Cricket Stadium, Dhaka	Pakistan by 50 runs
T20I 393	30 March	2	Australia	George Bailey	India	Mahendra Singh Dhoni	Sher-e-Bangla National Cricket Stadium, Dhaka	India by 73 runs
T20I 394	31 March	1	England	Stuart Broad	Netherlands	Peter Borren	Zahur Ahmed Chowdhury Stadium, Chittagong	Netherlands by 45 runs
T20I 395	31 March	1	New Zealand	Brendon McCullum	Sri Lanka	Lasith Malinga	Zahur Ahmed Chowdhury Stadium, Chittagong	Sri Lanka by 59 runs
T20I 396	1 April	2	Australia	George Bailey	Bangladesh	Mushfiqur Rahim	Sher-e-Bangla National Cricket Stadium, Dhaka	Australia by 7 wickets
T20I 397	1 April	2	Pakistan	Mohammad Hafeez	West Indies	Darren Sammy	Sher-e-Bangla National Cricket Stadium, Dhaka	West Indies by 84 runs

==== Knockout stage ====
Knockout stage
No.	Date	Team 1	Captain 1	Team 2	Captain 2	Venue	Result
Semi-finals
T20I 398	3 April	Sri Lanka	Lasith Malinga	West Indies	Darren Sammy	Sher-e-Bangla National Cricket Stadium, Dhaka	Sri Lanka by 27 runs (D/L)
T20I 399	4 April	India	Mahendra Singh Dhoni	South Africa	Faf du Plessis	Sher-e-Bangla National Cricket Stadium, Dhaka	India by 6 wickets
Final
T20I 400	6 April	India	Mahendra Singh Dhoni	Sri Lanka	Lasith Malinga	Sher-e-Bangla National Cricket Stadium, Dhaka	Sri Lanka by 6 wickets

===== Final Placings =====
Pos	Team	Status
1	Sri Lanka	Champion
2	India	Runner-Up
3	West Indies	Eliminated in semi-final
4	South Africa	Eliminated in semi-final
5	Pakistan	Eliminated in Super-10s
6	New Zealand	Eliminated in Super-10s
7	England	Eliminated in Super-10s
8	Australia	Eliminated in Super-10s
9	Netherlands	Eliminated in Super-10s
10	Bangladesh	Eliminated in Super-10s
11	Zimbabwe	Eliminated in the Group Stage
12	Nepal	Eliminated in the Group Stage
13	Ireland	Eliminated in the Group Stage
14	Afghanistan	Eliminated in the Group Stage
15	Hong Kong	Eliminated in the Group Stage
16	United Arab Emirates	Eliminated in the Group Stage

=== 2014 ICC Women's World Twenty20 ===
==== Group Stage ====
Pos	Team	Pld	W	L	NR	Pts	NRR
1	Australia	4	3	1	0	6	2.205
2	South Africa	4	3	1	0	6	1.606
3	New Zealand	4	3	1	0	6	1.275
4	Pakistan	4	1	3	0	2	−2.287
5	Ireland	4	0	4	0	0	−2.750

Source: ESPNCricinfo

Pos	Team	Pld	W	L	NR	Pts	NRR
1	England	4	3	1	0	6	1.363
2	West Indies	4	3	1	0	6	0.773
3	India	4	2	2	0	4	0.781
4	Sri Lanka	4	1	3	0	2	−0.437
5	Bangladesh	4	1	3	0	2	−2.387

Source: ESPNCricinfo

Group Stage
No.	Date	Group	Team 1	Captain 1	Team 2	Captain 2	Venue	Result
WT20I 247	23 March	A	Australia	Meg Lanning	New Zealand	Suzie Bates	Sylhet Stadium, Sylhet	New Zealand by 7 runs
WT20I 248	23 March	A	South Africa	Mignon du Preez	Pakistan	Sana Mir	Sylhet Stadium, Sylhet	South Africa by 44 runs
WT20I 249	24 March	B	England	Charlotte Edwards	West Indies	Merissa Aguilleira	Sylhet Stadium, Sylhet	West Indies by 9 runs
WT20I 250	24 March	B	India	Mithali Raj	Sri Lanka	Shashikala Siriwardene	Sylhet Stadium, Sylhet	Sri Lanka by 22 runs
WT20I 251	25 March	A	Ireland	Isobel Joyce	New Zealand	Suzie Bates	Sylhet Stadium, Sylhet	New Zealand by 42 runs
WT20I 252	25 March	A	South Africa	Mignon du Preez	Australia	Meg Lanning	Sylhet Stadium, Sylhet	Australia by 6 wickets
WT20I 253	26 March	B	Bangladesh	Salma Khatun	West Indies	Merissa Aguilleira	Sylhet Stadium, Sylhet	West Indies by 36 runs
WT20I 254	26 March	B	India	Mithali Raj	England	Charlotte Edwards	Sylhet Stadium, Sylhet	England by 5 wickets
WT20I 255	27 March	A	Ireland	Isobel Joyce	Australia	Meg Lanning	Sylhet Stadium, Sylhet	Australia by 78 runs
WT20I 256	27 March	A	New Zealand	Suzie Bates	Pakistan	Sana Mir	Sylhet Stadium, Sylhet	New Zealand by 67 runs
WT20I 257	28 March	B	Bangladesh	Salma Khatun	England	Charlotte Edwards	Sylhet Stadium, Sylhet	England by 79 runs
WT20I 258	28 March	B	Sri Lanka	Shashikala Siriwardene	West Indies	Merissa Aguilleira	Sylhet Stadium, Sylhet	West Indies by 8 wickets
WT20I 259	29 March	A	Ireland	Isobel Joyce	South Africa	Mignon du Preez	Sylhet Stadium, Sylhet	South Africa by 86 runs
WT20I 260	29 March	A	Australia	Meg Lanning	Pakistan	Sana Mir	Sylhet Stadium, Sylhet	Australia by 94 runs
WT20I 261	30 March	B	Bangladesh	Salma Khatun	India	Mithali Raj	Sylhet Stadium, Sylhet	India by 79 runs
WT20I 262	30 March	B	Sri Lanka	Shashikala Siriwardene	England	Charlotte Edwards	Sylhet Stadium, Sylhet	England by 7 wickets
WT20I 263	31 March	A	Ireland	Isobel Joyce	Pakistan	Sana Mir	Sylhet Stadium, Sylhet	Pakistan by 14 runs
WT20I 264	31 March	A	South Africa	Mignon du Preez	New Zealand	Suzie Bates	Sylhet Stadium, Sylhet	South Africa by 5 wickets
WT20I 265	1 April	B	Bangladesh	Salma Khatun	Sri Lanka	Shashikala Siriwardene	Sylhet Stadium, Sylhet	Bangladesh by 3 runs
WT20I 266	1 April	B	India	Mithali Raj	West Indies	Stafanie Taylor	Sylhet Stadium, Sylhet	India by 7 wickets

==== Play-offs ====
Qualification Play-offs
No.	Date	Team 1	Captain 1	Team 2	Captain 2	Venue	Result
WT20I 267	2 April	Sri Lanka	Shashikala Siriwardene	New Zealand	Suzie Bates	Sylhet Stadium, Sylhet	New Zealand by 6 wickets
WT20I 268	2 April	India	Mithali Raj	Pakistan	Sana Mir	Sylhet Stadium, Sylhet	India by 6 runs
WT20I 270	3 April	Pakistan	Sana Mir	Sri Lanka	Shashikala Siriwardene	Sylhet Stadium, Sylhet	Pakistan by 14 runs
WT20I 271	3 April	Bangladesh	Salma Khatun	Ireland	Isobel Joyce	Sylhet Stadium, Sylhet	India by 17 runs

Knockout stage
No.	Date	Team 1	Captain 1	Team 2	Captain 2	Venue	Result
Semi-finals
WT20I 269	3 April	Australia	Meg Lanning	West Indies	Merissa Aguilleira	Sylhet Stadium, Sylhet	Australia by 8 runs
WT20I 272	4 April	England	Charlotte Edwards	South Africa	Mignon du Preez	Sylhet Stadium, Sylhet	England by 9 wickets
Final
WT20I 273	6 April	England	Charlotte Edwards	Australia	Meg Lanning	Sylhet Stadium, Sylhet	Australia by 6 wickets

===== Final Placings =====
Pos	Team	Status
1	Australia	Champion
2	England	Runner-Up
3	West Indies	Eliminated in semi-final
4	South Africa	Eliminated in semi-final
5	India	Eliminated in Group stage
6	New Zealand	Eliminated in Group stage
7	Pakistan	Eliminated in Group stage
8	Sri Lanka	Eliminated in Group stage
9	Bangladesh	Eliminated in Group stage
10	Ireland	Eliminated in Group stage
