= 2013–14 PCB Women's Tri-Nation Series in Qatar =

Cricket tournament

The Pakistan Cricket Board (PCB) organized a Women's ODI tri-nation in Doha during January 2014 followed by a Women's T20I tri-nation series in the same month. The participating teams were Pakistan, South Africa and Ireland. Both tournaments were played in a round-robin format where each team faced every other team twice, followed by a final. All the matches were played at West End Park International Cricket Stadium, Doha.

== WODI Series ==
2013-14 PCB Qatar women's ODI Tri-Nation Series
- Date: 10-17 January 2014
- Location: Doha, Qatar
- Result: South Africa won the series
- Player of the series: (Pakistan) Javeria Khan
Teams
Pakistan	South Africa	Ireland
Captains
Sana Mir	Mignon du Preez	Isobel Joyce
Most runs
Javeria Khan (138)	Marizanne Kapp (75)	Clare Shillington (53)
Most wickets
Nida Dar (10)	Dane van Niekerk (9)	Elena Tice (4)

=== Squads ===
Pakistan	South Africa	Ireland
Sana Mir (c); Bismah Maroof (vc); Asmavia Iqbal; Batool Fatima (wk); Javeria Khan; Javeria Rauf; ~~Marina Iqbal~~; Nahida Khan; Nain Abidi; Nida Dar; Qanita Jalil; Sadia Yousuf; Sania Khan; Sidra Ameen; Sumaiya Siddiqi	Mignon du Preez (c); Trisha Chetty (wk); Moseline Daniels; Shandre Fritz; Shabnim Ismail; Marizanne Kapp; Lizelle Lee; Marcia Letsoalo; Sunette Loubser; Sune Luus; Nadine Moodley; Yolandi Potgieter; Chloe Tryon; Dane van Niekerk	Isobel Joyce (c); Laura Delany; Emma Flanagan; Jennifer Gray; Cecelia Joyce; Amy Kenealy; Louise McCarthy; Kate McKenna; Lucy O'Reilly; Rebecca Rolfe; Clare Shillington; Melissa Scott-Hayward; Elena Tice; Mary Waldron (wk)

Initially Marina Iqbal was named in Pakistan squad for both ODI and T20I. But later she withdrawn herself.

=== Points table ===
Pos	Team	Pld	W	L	T	NR	Pts	NRR
1	Pakistan	4	3	1	0	0	6	—
2	South Africa	4	2	1	0	1	5	—
3	Ireland	4	0	3	0	1	1	—

=== League Matches ===
==== 1st WODI ====
10 January 2014
13:00 (D/N)
Scorecard

Pakistan; 183/9 (50 overs)	v	Ireland; 73 (31 overs)
Nahida Khan 36 (76); Jennifer Gray 3/40 (9 overs)		Clare Shillington 29 (47); Sadia Yousuf 3/16 (7 overs)

Pakistan women won by 110 runs
West End Park International Cricket Stadium, Doha
Umpires: Ahmed Shahab (Pak) and Kamal Merchant (Pak)
Player of the match: Sana Mir (Pak)

- Pakistan women won the toss and elected to bat.
- Jennifer Gray (Ire) made her WODI debut.

==== 2nd WODI ====
11 January 2014
13:00 (N)
Scorecard

Ireland	v	South Africa

Match abandoned
West End Park International Cricket Stadium, Doha
Umpires: Tahir Shah (Pak) and Kamal Merchant (Pak)

- No toss.
- No play was possible due to rain.

==== 3rd WODI ====
12 January 2014
13:00 (D/N)
Scorecard

South Africa; 125/8 (50 overs)	v	Pakistan; 126/6 (49.1 overs)
Marizanne Kapp 44* (91); Nida Dar 4/15 (10 overs)		Bismah Maroof 60 (133); Sune Luus 2/25 (10 overs)

Pakistan women won by 4 wickets
West End Park International Cricket Stadium, Doha
Umpires: Ahmed Shahab (Pak) and Kamal Merchant (Pak)
Player of the match: Bismah Maroof (Pak)

- South Africa women won the toss and elected to field.

==== 4th WODI ====
13 January 2014
13:00 (D/N)
Scorecard

Ireland; 92 (48.3 overs)	v	Ireland; 93/3 (26 overs)
Isobel Joyce 36* (104); Sana Mir 3/11 (9 overs)		Javeria Khan 51* (86); Elena Tice 3/31 (10 overs)

Pakistan women won by 7 wickets
West End Park International Cricket Stadium, Doha
Umpires: Ahmed Shahab (Pak) and Mohammad Nasim (Pak)
Player of the match: Javeria Khan (Pak)

- Ireland women won the toss and elected to bat.

==== 5th WODI ====
14 January 2014
13:00 (N)
Scorecard

Ireland; 53 (35.4 overs)	v	South Africa; 54/2 (13.5 overs)
Melissa Scott-Hayward 20 (71); Dane van Niekerk 3/8 (5.4 overs)		Trisha Chetty 24 (38); Isobel Joyce 1/4 (2 overs)

South Africa women won by 8 wickets
West End Park International Cricket Stadium, Doha
Umpires: Nadeem Malik (Pak) and Kamal Merchant (Pak)
Player of the match: Dane van Niekerk (SA)

- South Africa women won the toss and elected to field.

==== 6th WODI ====
15 January 2014
13:00 (D/N)
Scorecard

Pakistan; 101 (44.4 overs)	v	South Africa; 105/7 (41.3 overs)
Bismah Maroof 30 (80); Dane van Niekerk 5/17 (6.4 overs)		Shandre Fritz 43* (88); Nida Dar 3/23 (9.3 overs)

South Africa women won by 3 wickets
West End Park International Cricket Stadium, Doha
Umpires: Ahmed Shahab (Pak) and Tahir Shah (Pak)
Player of the match: Dane van Niekerk (SA)

- Pakistan women won the toss and elected to bat.
- Dane van Niekerk took her second five-wicket haul in WODIs.

=== Final ===
17 January 2014
13:00 (D/N)
Scorecard

Pakistan; 94 (46.3 overs)	v	South Africa; 95/6 (43.3 overs)
Javeria Khan 30 (64); Shabnim Ismail 3/25 (10 overs)		Sunette Loubser 25* (73); Sumaiya Siddiqi 2/14 (9 overs)

South Africa women won by 4 wickets
West End Park International Cricket Stadium, Doha
Umpires: Ahmed Shahab (Pak) and Kamal Merchant (Pak)
Player of the match: Sunette Loubser (SA)

- South Africa women won the toss and elected to field.

== WT20I Series ==
The Twenty20 tournament started on 19 January with the final match taking place on 24 January. These matches are also played at Doha.

2013-14 PCB Qatar women's T20I Tri-Nation Series
- Date: 19-24 January 2014
- Location: Doha, Qatar
- Result: Pakistan won the series
- Player of the series: (South Africa) Lizelle Lee
Teams
Pakistan	South Africa	Ireland
Captains
Sana Mir	Mignon du Preez	Isobel Joyce
Most runs
Nain Abidi (92)	Lizelle Lee (140)	Isobel Joyce (118)
Most wickets
Sania Khan (6)	Moseline Daniels (5)	Laura Delany (3)

=== Squads ===
Pakistan	South Africa	Ireland
Sana Mir (c); Bismah Maroof (vc); Asmavia Iqbal; Batool Fatima (wk); Javeria Khan; Javeria Rauf; ~~Marina Iqbal~~; Nahida Khan; Nain Abidi; Nida Dar; Qanita Jalil; Sadia Yousuf; Sania Khan; Sidra Ameen; Sumaiya Siddiqi	Mignon du Preez (c); Trisha Chetty (wk); Moseline Daniels; Shandre Fritz; Shabnim Ismail; Marizanne Kapp; Lizelle Lee; Marcia Letsoalo; Sunette Loubser; Sune Luus; Nadine Moodley; Yolandi Potgieter; Chloe Tryon; Dane van Niekerk	Isobel Joyce (c); Laura Delany; Emma Flanagan; Jennifer Gray; Cecelia Joyce; Amy Kenealy; Louise McCarthy; Kate McKenna; Lucy O'Reilly; Rebecca Rolfe; Clare Shillington; Melissa Scott-Hayward; Elena Tice; Mary Waldron (wk)

=== Points table ===
Pos	Team	Pld	W	L	T	NR	Pts	NRR
1	South Africa	4	3	1	0	0	6	0.670
2	Pakistan	4	2	2	0	0	4	0.577
3	Ireland	4	1	3	0	0	2	−1.246

=== League Matches ===
==== 1st WT20I ====
19 January 2014
13:00
Scorecard

South Africa; 64/8 (20 overs)	v	Pakistan; 65/4 (14 overs)
Mignon du Preez 14 (34); Nida Dar 2/3 (4 overs)		Nain Abidi 28 (32); Chloe Tryon 2/8 (3 overs)

Pakistan women won by 6 wickets
West End Park International Cricket Stadium, Doha
Umpires: Ahmed Shahab (Pak) and Nadeem Malik (Pak)
Player of the match: Nain Abidi (Pak)

- Pakistan women won the toss and elected to field.

==== 2nd WT20I ====
19 January 2014
17:00 (N)
Scorecard

Pakistan; 97/4 (20 overs)	v	Ireland; 98/4 (19.4 overs)
Nida Dar 28 (33); Isobel Joyce 1/12 (4 overs)		Cecelia Joyce 30* (41); Sania Khan 2/8 (3 overs)

Ireland women won by 6 wickets
West End Park International Cricket Stadium, Doha
Umpires: Mohammad Nasim (Pak) and Kamal Merchant (Pak)
Player of the match: Isobel Joyce

- Ireland women won the toss and elected to field.
- Kate McKenna made her WT20I debut.

==== 3rd WT20I ====
12 January 2014
13:00
Scorecard

South Africa; 119/2 (20 overs)	v	Ireland; 73/8 (20 overs)
Lizelle Lee 50 (63); Laura Delany 2/33 (4 overs)		Mary Waldron 13 (15); Dane van Niekerk 3/15 (4 overs)

South Africa women won by 46 runs
West End Park International Cricket Stadium, Doha
Umpires: Ahmed Shahab (Pak) and Tahir Shah (Pak)
Player of the match: Lizelle Lee (RSA)

- Ireland women won the toss and elected to field.
- Lizelle Lee scored her maiden WT20I half-century.

==== 4th WT20I ====
20 January 2014
17:00 (D/N)
Scorecard

Pakistan; 132/5 (20 overs)	v	Ireland; 111/5 (20 overs)
Nain Abidi 56 (58); Louise McCarthy 1/25 (4 overs)		Elena Tice 44* (49); Qanita Jalil 2/14 (4 overs)

Pakistan women won by 21 runs
West End Park International Cricket Stadium, Doha
Umpires: Kamal Merchant (Pak) and Mohammad Nasim (Pak)
Player of the match: Nain Abidi (Pak)

- Ireland women won the toss and elected to field.
- Jennifer Gray (Ire) made her WT20I debut.

==== 5th WT20I ====
22 January 2014
13:00
Scorecard

Ireland; 101/7 (20 overs)	v	South Africa; 102/1 (14.2 overs)
Isobel Joyce 47 (48); Moseline Daniels 1/7 (4 overs)		Lizelle Lee 53 (50); Amy Kenealy 1/28 (3 overs)

South Africa women won by 9 wickets
West End Park International Cricket Stadium, Doha
Umpires: Nadeem Iqbal (Pak) and Kamal Merchant (Pak)
Player of the match: Lizelle Lee (RSA)

- South Africa women won the toss and elected to field.

==== 6th WT20I ====
22 January 2014
17:00 (N)
Scorecard

Pakistan; 96 (20 overs)	v	South Africa; 97/3 (19.1 overs)
Nahida Khan 33 (41); Moseline Daniels 3/17 (4 overs)		Mignon du Preez 38* (34); Sana Mir 1/10 (4 overs)

South Africa women won by 3 wickets
West End Park International Cricket Stadium, Doha
Umpires: Ahmed Shahab (Pak) and Tahir Shah (Pak)
Player of the match: Mignon du Preez (SA)

- South Africa women won the toss and elected to field.
- Nadine Moodley (SA) made her WT20I debut.

=== Final ===
24 January 2014
17:00 (D/N)
Scorecard

South Africa; 68/9 (20 overs)	v	Pakistan; 72/3 (16.1 overs)
Marizanne Kapp 40 (48); Asmavia Iqbal 2/14 (4 overs)		Javeria Khan 38 (46); Moseline Daniels 1/13 (3 overs)

Pakistan women won by 7 wickets
West End Park International Cricket Stadium, Doha
Umpires: Ahmed Shahab (Pak) and Kamal Merchant (Pak)
Player of the match: Javeria Khan (Pak)

- Pakistan women won the toss and elected to field.

=== External links ===
- 50-over Tri-series home at ESPN Cricinfo
- 20-over Tri-series home at ESPN Cricinfo
