= Grace O'Flanagan =

Ireland women's hockey international

Personal information
- Born: 7 April 1989 (age 37)

Sport
- Sport: Field hockey
- Position: Goalkeeper
Senior career
Years	Team	Caps	Goals
2007–2010	UCD Ladies	-	-
2010–	Railway Union	-	-
2010–2016	→ RCSI	-	-
National team
Years	Team	Caps	Goals
2012–	Ireland	34	-
Medal record
World Cup
Silver medal – second place	2018 London

Grace O'Flanagan (born 7 April 1989) is an Ireland women's field hockey international. She was a member of the Ireland team that played in the 2018 Women's Hockey World Cup final. In 2009 O'Flanagan also won an Irish Senior Cup final with UCD and in 2012–13 won a Women's Irish Hockey League/Irish Senior Cup double with Railway Union. O'Flanagan is also a qualified doctor.

== Early years and education ==
Between 2001 and 2007 O'Flanagan attended Loreto College, Foxrock. Between 2007 and 2010 she attended University College Dublin where she gained a Bachelor of Commerce in Banking And Finance. Between 2010 and 2016 she attended the Royal College of Surgeons in Ireland and subsequently qualified as a doctor. While attending RCSI, O'Flanagan also played for the college's hockey team.

== Club career ==
=== UCD ===
Between 2007 and 2010 O'Flanagan played for UCD. In addition to playing as a goalkeeper for the first team she also served as club treasurer. In 2009 she kept goal for UCD as they defeated Pegasus 4–1 in the Irish Senior Cup final.

=== Railway Union ===
In 2012–13 O'Flanagan was a member of the Railway Union team that won a national double, winning both the Women's Irish Hockey League and the Irish Senior Cup. In the cup final Railway Union defeated UCD 3–2. O'Flanagan's teammates at Railway Union included Cecelia and Isobel Joyce, Emer Lucey and Kate McKenna. O'Flanagan has also represented Railway Union in European club competitions, including the 2014 EuroHockey Club Champions Cup.

== Ireland international ==
O'Flanagan made her senior debut for Ireland in 2012. She subsequently represented Ireland at the 2013 Women's EuroHockey Nations Championship. On 22 July 2017 at the 2016–17 Women's FIH Hockey World League Semifinals, after Ayeisha McFerran was sin-binned in the seventh and eighth place play-off against India, O'Flanagan came on as replacement. With her first touch she saved the subsequent penalty stroke. Ireland were 1–0 down at the time but eventually went onto win 2–1. Ireland's seventh-place finish in at the tournament eventually saw them qualify for the 2018 Women's Hockey World Cup. At the 2017 Women's EuroHockey Nations Championship, O'Flanagan was Ireland's first choice goalkeeper.

O'Flanagan represented Ireland at the 2018 Women's Hockey World Cup and was a member of the team that won the silver medal. During the tournament she served as the reserve goalkeeper to Ayeisha McFerran. She featured in several games during the tournament, including the pool stage game against England and in the final against the Netherlands.

Tournaments	Place
2013 Women's EuroHockey Nations Championship	7th
2016–17 Women's FIH Hockey World League Semifinals	7th
2017 Women's Four Nations Cup	2nd
2017 Women's EuroHockey Nations Championship	6th
2018 Women's Hockey World Cup	2nd place, silver medalist(s)

== Personal life ==
O'Flanagan is a qualified doctor. Since January 2018 she has worked as a Senior house officer in Otolaryngology at the Royal Victoria Eye and Ear Hospital. She has previously trained at Beaumont Hospital, Dublin, Northwestern Memorial Hospital and St. Vincent's University Hospital.

== Honours ==
Ireland

- Women's Hockey World Cup
  - Runners Up: 2018
- Women's Four Nations Cup
  - Runners Up: 2017

Railway Union

- Irish Senior Cup
  - Winners: 2012–13
- Women's Irish Hockey League
  - Winners: 2012–13

UCD

- Irish Senior Cup
  - Winners: 2008–09
