= Ed Joyce =

Irish cricket coach and former cricketer

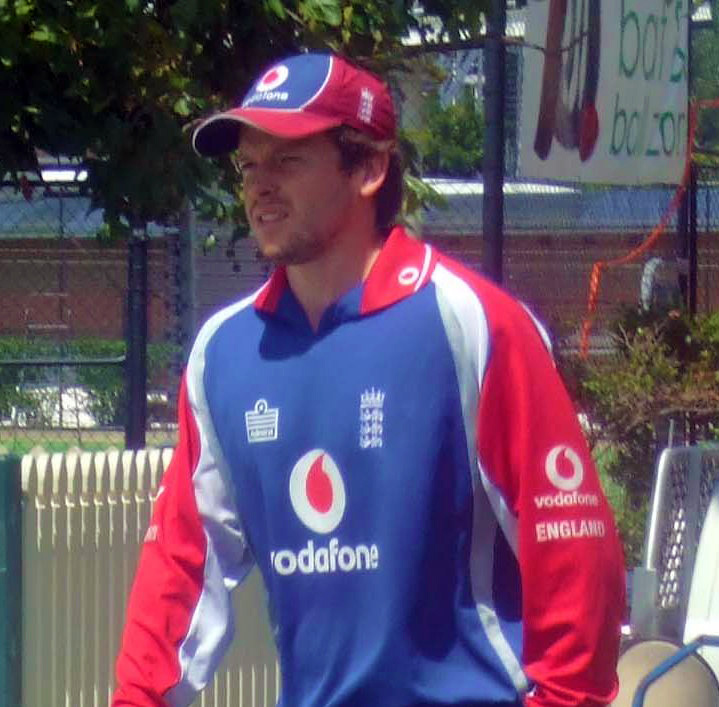
- Joyce in 2007

Personal information
- Full name: Edmund Christopher Joyce
- Born: 22 September 1978 (age 48); Dublin, Ireland
- Batting: Left-handed
- Bowling: Right-arm medium
- Role: Opening batsman

International information
- National sides: England (2006–2007); Ireland (2011–2018)
- Only Test (cap 3): 11 May 2018; Ireland v Pakistan
- ODI debut (cap 193/37): 13 June 2006; England v Ireland
- Last ODI: 16 March 2018; Ireland v Zimbabwe
- ODI shirt no.: 24 (36 for England)
- T20I debut (cap 14/21): 15 June 2006; England v Sri Lanka
- Last T20I: 21 March 2014; Ireland v Netherlands
- T20I shirt no.: 24 (36 for England)

Domestic team information
- Years: Team
- 1999–2008: Middlesex
- 2009–2017: Sussex (squad no. 24)
- 2017–2018: Leinster Lightning

Head coaching information
- Years: Team
- 2019–: Ireland women

Career statistics
Competition	Test	ODI	T20I	FC
Matches	1	78	18	255
Runs scored	47	2,622	405	18,461
Batting average	23.50	38.00	33.75	47.95
100s/50s	0/0	6/15	0/1	47/92
Top score	43	160*	78*	250
Balls bowled	–	–	–	1,311
Wickets	–	–	–	11
Bowling average	–	–	–	93.90
5 wickets in innings	–	–	–	0
10 wickets in match	–	–	–	0
Best bowling	–	–	–	2/34
Catches/stumpings	1/–	27/–	5/–	228/–
- Source: ESPNcricinfo, 12 June 2019

Edmund Christopher Joyce (born 22 September 1978) is an Irish cricket coach and former cricketer who played for both the Ireland and England national cricket teams. After beginning his career with Middlesex, he moved to Sussex in 2009, before returning to Ireland to play for Leinster Lightning in the fledgling first-class competition, the Irish Inter-Provincial Championship. A left-handed batsman and occasional right-arm bowler of medium pace, Joyce is widely regarded as one of the best cricketers produced by Ireland.

After qualifying to play for England, Joyce was a member of the squad in the 2006–07 Ashes series and 2007 World Cup. Since dropping down the pecking order for selection with England, Joyce got special dispensation from the International Cricket Council (ICC) to play for Ireland in the 2011 World Cup.

He was one of the eleven cricketers to play in Ireland's first ever Test match, against Pakistan. On 24 May 2018, he announced his retirement from all professional cricket. In June 2019, Joyce was appointed as the interim head coach of the Ireland women's cricket team.

== Early life ==
He was born in Dublin, educated at St. Patrick's Primary School, Bray, County Wicklow and at Presentation College, Bray, and studied economics at Trinity College, Dublin.

== County career ==
=== Middlesex ===
Joyce made his Middlesex debut in 1999 and won the NBC Denis Compton Award in 2000. He has been a regular member of the first team since 2002, in which year he averaged 51 and scored four hundreds. Joyce replaced Owais Shah as acting county captain midway through the 2004 season, but was not appointed for the 2005 season with Ben Hutton taking over.

Joyce was acting captain for most of the 2008 season in the absence of the injured Ed Smith this included leading the Middlesex team to victory in the 2008 Twenty20 Cup. After this competition, the captaincy was handed to Shaun Udal whilst there was uncertainty around Joyce's long-term future at the club.

=== Sussex ===
Joyce's batting statistics with Sussex
	Matches	Runs	Average	100/50	Highest score
First-class	113	8,348	49.39	23/39	250
List A	79	3,105	47.04	8/13	146
Twenty20	35	529	18.24	0/1	56

It was announced on 3 November 2008 that Joyce would be leaving Middlesex to play for Sussex. Vinny Codrington, Middlesex's chief executive, said "[Joyce] felt he needed a fresh challenge. He felt moving counties would help him rediscover the form that got him into the England side a couple of years ago... He was always one of the first names on the team-sheet and he has been outstanding and undoubtedly we're going to miss him". Despite his imminent departure, Middlesex included Joyce in their squad for the Stanford Super Series and the eventually-cancelled Twenty20 Champions League as a gesture of gratitude for his influence in winning the Twenty20 Cup.

A strong first season for Sussex, with three centuries, ensured Joyce remained on the fringes of England selection, being named in the provisional England squad for the 2009 ICC Champions Trophy and in November 2009, he signed a new three-year contract with the county.

Joyce suffered a unique dismissal in a 2009 Championship game against Warwickshire. He swept a ball from Ant Botha straight into short-leg fielder Jonathan Trott's pocket. Trott had turned his back and leapt out of the way of the ball; he was stunned to find the ball lodged in his right pocket. He became Sussex captain on 31 July 2012, succeeding Michael Yardy.

In October 2015, Joyce announced he would step down as captain of the Sussex team following their relegation from the County Championship Division One.

== International career ==
=== Ireland: to 2005 ===
Joyce played a number of matches for Ireland in the ICC Trophy, averaging over 70 in the competition, but in July 2005 qualified to play for England by virtue of his residency there. In October 2005, Joyce was selected for the England cricket academy and gained a spot in the England "A" squad to tour the West Indies in Spring 2006. In June 2006 he was selected in the England One Day International (ODI) squad for the series with Sri Lanka.

He made his England ODI debut against Ireland in Stormont Park, Belfast in June 2006. The Irish team included his younger brother, Dominick. Two days later, he represented England in his first Twenty20 International, but sprained his ankle and was out injured for four weeks. He made his return for Middlesex at Edgbaston on 14 July 2006, in the County Championship against Warwickshire, scoring a career-best 211 in the first innings.

=== England: 2006–2007 ===
On 15 November 2006, Joyce was selected by England's chairman of selectors, David Graveney, to be in the Test squad for the 2006/2007 Ashes series, in place of Marcus Trescothick, who withdrew, suffering from a stress-related illness. This was a somewhat controversial decision as he was given preference over the more experienced Owais Shah and Rob Key.

Although he was not chosen for any of the Tests against Australia he was chosen to play in the subsequent One-day International series following an injury to Kevin Pietersen. He totalled 288 runs in nine matches at an average of 32.00, including his maiden half-century in the losing run-chase against New Zealand at Perth.

However, the highlight of the series for Joyce was the victory over Australia at the SCG on 2 February 2007. Opening the innings, Joyce scored a match-winning 107 from 142 balls, helping England amass 292–7, and became the first English cricketer to score a One Day International century away from home in nineteen matches.

Joyce was named Man of the Match for his performance, and the innings helped him earn a place in the squad for the World Cup in the West Indies. During the 2007 World Cup, Joyce made fifties against the non-Test nations of Canada and Kenya, but made a duck against New Zealand in the first group game and 1 against his native Ireland as well as dropping a catch in the first Super Eight game.

=== Ireland: 2011–2018 ===
While he was scoring heavily for Sussex in 2009, Joyce harboured hopes of breaking back into the England team. However, he was overlooked and by March 2010 was considering representing Ireland again. Joyce explained his choice to return to Irish colours:

When I made the decision in 2001 to try and play for England, it was with a view to trying to play Test cricket which is the pinnacle of the game and which of course Ireland doesn't play. While I strongly believe I'm good enough to play Test cricket for England, I've taken the decision now to try and play for Ireland again. There are a few reasons for this, with the most obvious being that I'm a born and bred Irishman. Secondly, I feel I have a lot to offer to Irish cricket. I had a very successful 2009 with Sussex winning the Most Valuable Player award for the Friends Provident trophy and also two winners medals in theTwenty20 Cup and Nat West Pro40 competition. I feel I'm playing the best cricket of my career and would like to bring this form with me to help Ireland be even more successful on the world stage, a success which I am committed to running in tandem with my Sussex career, in the same way that other Irish players have satisfied club and country commitments really well.

— Ed Joyce, May 2010

Under normal circumstances it takes four years to qualify to play for a country; having played for England at the 2007 World Cup in April 2007, Joyce was set to miss playing for Ireland in the 2011 tournament, taking place in February.

In October it was announced that Joyce and former New Zealand international Hamish Marshall would tour India with Ireland; it was hoped that it would assist their integration into the team in the event the ICC allowed them to play for Ireland in ODIs.

In November 2010, the ICC announced that Joyce's qualification period would be shortened by the ICC and that he would be allowed to play for Ireland at the World Cup, and he was subsequently selected in Ireland's 15-man squad for the tournament.

In May 2015 Joyce and fellow cricketer Tim Murtagh announced their retirement from T20 cricket (although Murtagh subsequently reversed his decision to retire from the format).

In June 2015 Joyce scored 231 runs in the first innings against the United Arab Emirates in the 2015–17 ICC Intercontinental Cup at Malahide. It was the highest by an Ireland player in multi-day cricket and was the first double century scored by an Irish player on home soil.

==== Test cricket ====
In May 2018, he was named in a fourteen-man squad for Ireland's first ever Test match, which was played against Pakistan later the same month. He made his Test debut for Ireland on 11 May 2018. At 39 years and 231 days he was the oldest Test debutant this century, and the oldest since Omar Henry who was 40 years and 215 days when South Africa resumed Test cricket after their imposed isolationism due to apartheid.

Joyce faced the first delivery and scored the first run for Ireland in Test cricket. He also became the first batsman to be dismissed for Ireland, when he was out lbw, bowled by Mohammad Abbas. A week after the Test match, he retired from all forms of cricket.

=== International record ===
Joyce's Test, ODI and T20I batting and fielding statistics
	Matches	Runs	Avge	100/50	HS	Ct
Ireland (Test)	1	47	23.50	0/0	43	1
England (ODI)	17	471	27.70	1/3	107	6
Ireland (ODI)	61	2,151	41.36	5/12	160*	21
England (T20I)	2	1	1.00	0/0	1	0
Ireland (T20I)	16	404	36.72	0/1	78*	5

== Coaching ==
In September 2019, Joyce was appointed as the head coach of Ireland women's cricket team.

== Family ==
Ed is the sixth-born of nine children of James "Jimmy" and Maureen Joyce, all of whom began their cricketing lives at Bray Cricket Club, now called North Wicklow. Five of the Joyce siblings have represented Ireland at cricket. Brothers Gus and Dominick played for the Irish men's team (the latter in three ODI matches), while twin sisters, Isobel and Cecelia, have represented the Irish women for the past decade. Brothers Johnny and Damian played club cricket in Dublin and Wicklow, though did not play professionally.

His mother Maureen Joyce was a cricket scorer. She was also scorer in two WODIs in 2002 when New Zealand women toured to Netherlands and Ireland.

Joyce's eldest sister, Helen Joyce, is an author who is best known for her work focusing on transgender issues.

== See also ==
- List of cricketers who have played for more than one international team
