= Frank Miller (Irish cricketer) =

Irish cricketer

Personal information
- Full name: Frank Joseph Miller
- Born: 2 October 1916; Cork, Ireland
- Died: 3 January 2000 (aged 83); Donnybrook, Leinster, Ireland
- Batting: Right-handed
- Role: Wicket-keeper

Domestic team information
- Years: Team
- 1949–1954: Ireland

Career statistics
Competition	First-class
Matches	7
Runs scored	44
Batting average	8.80
100s/50s	–/–
Top score	18*
Balls bowled	0
Wickets	–
Bowling average	–
5 wickets in innings	–
10 wickets in match	–
Best bowling	–
Catches/stumpings	8/7
- Source: Cricinfo, 2 November 2018

Frank Joseph Miller (2 October 1916 – 3 January 2000) was an Irish first-class cricketer.

Miller was born at Cork in October 1916, and was educated in Dublin at Belvedere College. Playing his club cricket in Dublin for Phoenix and later Railway Union, he made his debut for Ireland in a minor match against a touring Yorkshire side in July 1949 at Dublin. Later that same month, he made his debut in first-class cricket for Ireland against Scotland at Belfast. He played first-class cricket for Ireland from 1949–1954, making a total of seven appearances. Across his seven first-class matches, Millers scored a total of 44 runs at an average of 8.80, with a highest score of 18 not out. Behind the stumps, he took eight catches and made seven stumpings. Outside of cricket, he worked an executive in the insurance industry. He died at Donnybrook in January 2000.
