= Helen Joyce =

Irish journalist and author (born 1968)

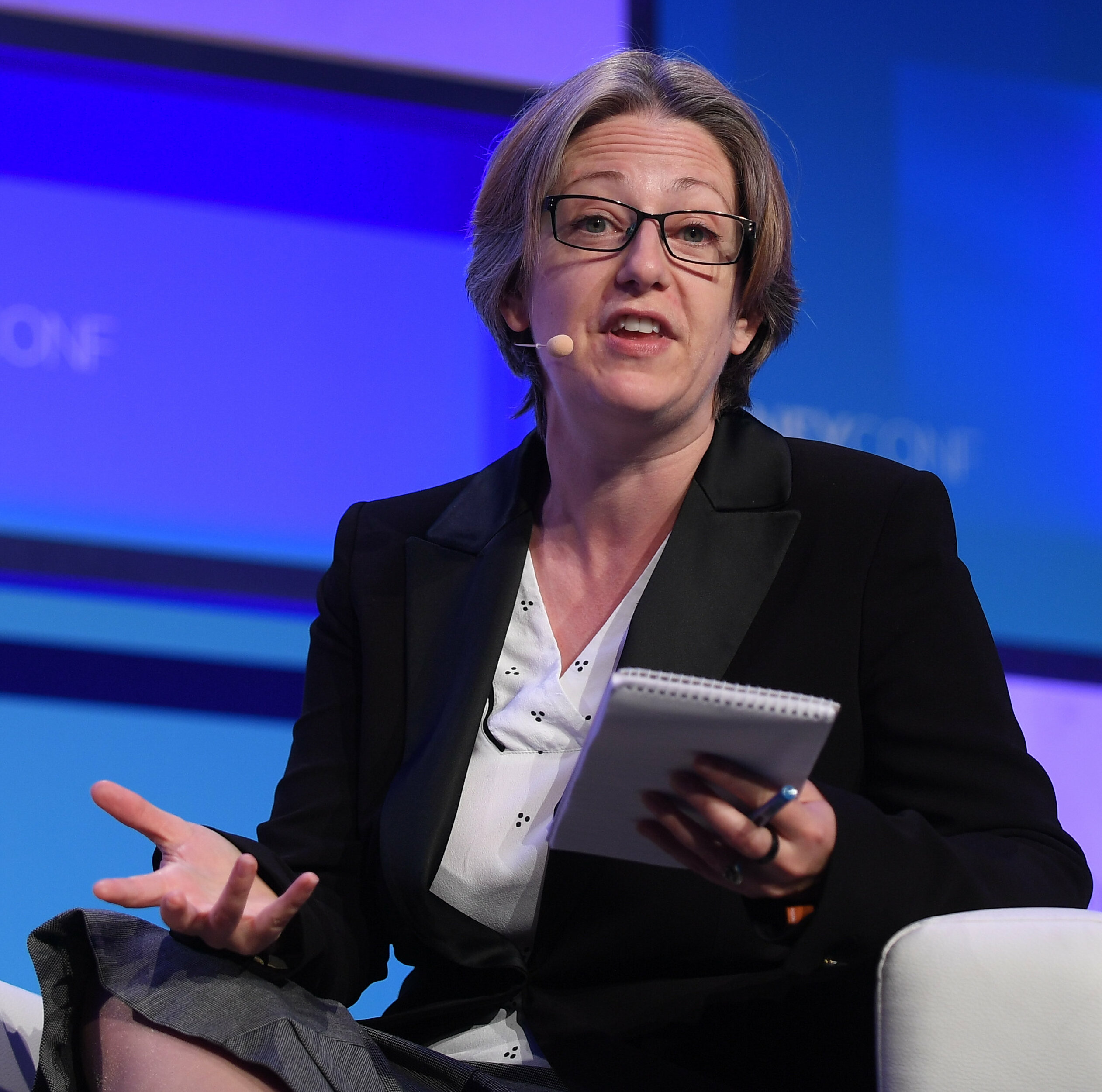
- Joyce speaking at MoneyConf 2018
- Born: 1968 (age 57–58); Dublin, Ireland
- Education: Trinity College Dublin (BA); University of Cambridge (MASt); University College London (PhD)
- Occupations: Journalist; Activist
- Employer(s): The Economist (as journalist 2005-2022)
- Notable work: Trans: When Ideology Meets Reality
- Family: Gus Joyce (brother); Ed Joyce (brother); Dominick Joyce (brother); Isobel Joyce (sister); Cecelia Joyce (sister)
- Website: thehelenjoyce.com

Helen Janeith Joyce (born 1968) is an Irish journalist and gender critical activist. She studied as a mathematician and worked in academia before becoming a journalist. Joyce began working for The Economist as education correspondent for its Britain section in 2005 and has since held several senior positions, including finance editor and international editor. She published her book Trans: When Ideology Meets Reality in 2021.

== Early life and education ==
She was born in 1968 in Dublin, Ireland, and moved to Bray, County Wicklow at age 8. She is the oldest of nine children of James "Jimmy" and Maureen Joyce, five boys and four girls. Five of her younger siblings — Gus, Ed, Dominick, Isobel, and Cecelia Joyce — have played international cricket for Ireland, while Ed has also played for the England test side. Brothers Johnny and Damian played club cricket. Johnny is an international chess player.

Joyce moved to England at age 16 to attend musical theatre college, but dropped out after two years. In 1987, she enrolled at Trinity College, Dublin, where she was elected a Scholar in 1989, and received a BA in mathematics in 1991. She next completed Part III of the Mathematical Tripos for a Master of Advanced Studies with distinction at the University of Cambridge, earning a scholarship from the British Council and a PhD place at University College London. She got a PhD in geometric measure theory at University College London (1995) with the dissertation "Packing measures, packing dimensions, and the existence of sets of positive finite measure" under David Preiss. She then took a postdoctoral position in Cardiff, and spent two years at Finland's University of Jyväskylä on a Marie Curie research fellowship funded by the European Union.

== Career ==
In 2000 Joyce joined the Millennium Mathematics Project (MMP), an organisation set up to advocate for mathematics education in schools and other venues, at the University of Cambridge. She primarily worked on telecommunication and video education projects with schools. In 2002 she was named editor of the project's online Plus Magazine, a position she held for three years. In 2004 she also became founding editor for the Royal Statistical Society's quarterly magazine Significance.

In 2005 Joyce became an education correspondent for The Economist. Four years later she transferred to the newspaper's project exploring how to best present statistics to readers. In August 2010 she moved to São Paulo to become The Economist′s Brazil bureau chief, a position she held through 2013. Returning to London she served as The Economist′s finance editor and international editor and in March 2020 became its executive editor for events business.

In 2022, Joyce took a one-year unpaid sabbatical from The Economist to join the gender-critical campaign group Sex Matters as a director, which she made permanent at the end of the sabbatical year.

== Views on transgender topics ==
In July 2018, Joyce curated a series of articles on transgender identity in The Economist.

GLAAD shared a report with The Daily Dot in March 2019 which analysed Joyce's tweets. The magazine stated the tweets "claimed, among other things, that the trans rights movement is enabling sexual predators... referred to puberty blockers or other treatments that affirm a trans child’s sense of self as 'sickening'... [and] also called these procedures 'child abuse,' 'unethical medicine,' 'mass experimentation,' and a 'global scandal'". When The Economist was asked if they would continue to stand by Joyce following the report, they described her as an "outstanding journalist in whom we have complete confidence" and did not elaborate.

GLAAD described Joyce's December 2018 article "The New Patriarchy: How Trans Radicalism Hurts Women, Children—and Trans People Themselves" for Quillette as 'alarming' stating that Joyce had "no place in a newsroom". Joyce responded that the organization had been "co-opted by [GLAAD board member] Anthony Watson to continue his unprovoked attacks against me". ThinkProgress's LGBTQ editor Zack Ford stated that in Joyce's collection "the guise of ‘debate’ justified publishing numerous anti-trans essays that included junk science and scaremongering".

In April 2022, Joyce took a leave of absence from The Economist to become the director of advocacy for Sex Matters. She wrote an opinion piece for the Guardian arguing that gender identity change efforts should not be included in a bill banning conversion therapy.

In June 2022, PinkNews reported that Joyce had spoken in favour of "reducing or keeping down the number of people who transition" and said that "every one of those people is a person who's been damaged" and "every one of those people is basically, you know, a huge problem to a sane world". Her interviewer described this as not "heartless", but motivated by compassionate desire "to try to limit the [broader social] harm" trans people cause and suffer. Several different scholars have variously described the statement as publicly expressing "explicitly eugenic and genocidal attitudes toward trans people", indicative of a desire that trans people "be forced back into a state of repression and self-denial", and voicing the implications of "toxifying ideas about transness as an infiltrating, contagious, corrupting threat to vulnerable girls" advanced by figures such as Janice Raymond and Abigail Shrier.

In June 2024, she applauded the Conservative Government's decision not to pursue a ban on conversion therapy and claimed "most children feeling gender distress or convinced of an opposite-sex identity will grow out of this during puberty".

In 2024, the Australian Federal court refused to let Joyce testify as an expert in Tickle v Giggle, stating her views were opinions and that "she [even] lacked sufficient expertise for the exception to the opinion rule to apply".

Joyce has argued that gender critical feminists turn to Christian Right news outlets because they feel frozen out by mainstream media. Alex Sharpe argued that gender critical feminists in the UK had been given significant platforms by right-wing media and that Joyce "has been given numerous platforms to articulate and circulate her ‘gender critical’ views despite lacking any expertise concerning the issues she discusses".

=== Trans: When Ideology Meets Reality ===
In July 2021, Joyce's book Trans: When Ideology Meets Reality, was published by Oneworld Publications. The book sold well, debuting within a week of its publication at number 7 on The Sunday Times list of bestselling general hardbacks and remaining in the top 10 for a second week. It was named as one of the year's best books by The Times. The book received other positive reviews in the Evening Standard by Stella O'Malley, New Statesman, and The Scotsman.

The Times regular columnist David Aaronovitch wrote that "Joyce [examines] a new ideology about gender. This holds that biological sex is as much a 'social construct' as the idea of gender is. One benefit of Joyce's book is its intellectual clarity and its refusal to compromise. So she takes apart this ideology of gender with a cold rigour."

Kathleen Stock, then a professor of philosophy at the University of Sussex and author of Material Girls: Why Reality Matters for Feminism (2021), gave Trans a 5-star review at The Telegraph, calling it a "superlative critical analysis of trans activism" and that "Joyce shows an impressive capacity to handle complex statistics, legal statutes, and other bits of evidence without losing clarity or narrative drive."

The Guardian gave it a mixed review saying "there are some curious holes in this book" and calling it "an exasperated polemic." A review at Publishers Weekly criticized the book as "alarmist" and a "one-sided takedown" that "comes up short." It compared the book's mentions of billionaires, academics and healthcare companies to conspiracy thinking.

Aaron Rabinowitz, writing for The Skeptic, criticised Joyce for her repeating activist Jennifer Bilek's claims that a cabal of Jewish billionaires fund the transgender rights movement through contributions to organisations such as Planned Parenthood and the American Civil Liberties Union. Joyce published a rebuttal to these allegations, in which Joyce denied plagiarism and antisemitism, denounced Bilek's antisemitism and reiterated the thesis of her book. She also corrected a claim about a donation made by the Open Society Foundation; the donation was to a similarly named group which also advocated for gender self-identification.

The book was shortlisted for the 2023 John Maddox Prize.

=== Talks ===
In March 2022, Joyce was due to appear in a panel discussion which would have been part of an event for an expected 100 to 150 trainee child psychiatrists organised by Great Ormond Street Hospital and Health Education England on how the trainees could best support gender-questioning young people. Before the event the organisers received allegations against Joyce and were warned "There is no possible way in which this event can possibly be a 'safe environment' for LGBTQ+ and especially trans participants". Joyce was disinvited days before the event, which was later postponed. Joyce responded, "It's outrageous that a journalist who has written a best-selling book spelling out the harms of this bizarre, evidence-free ideology is no-platformed and subjected to a smear campaign."

In October 2022, Joyce participated in an interview with economist Partha Dasgupta at Gonville and Caius College, Cambridge. Philosopher Arif Ahmed hosted the event, titled "Criticising gender-identity ideology: what happens when speech is silenced". Protestors chanted "trans rights are human rights" and banged drums outside the event. The college master Pippa Rogerson and senior tutor Andrew Spencer boycotted the event and described Joyce's views as "polemics". In response, Joyce published an open letter entitled "Has Cambridge abandoned debate?" in The Spectator, in which she argued that "The academic commitment to fair-minded debate is over."

In February 2025, at an event at Balliol College, Oxford, Joyce discussed her views on transgender issues, sex and gender, with host John Maier of The Times. A walkout by pro-trans protesters reportedly left Joyce and Maier briefly speechless. A petition "protesting transphobia" at the university had been signed by over 600 people. Joyce said she was a "sex realist" and described being transgender as a "rights-destroying belief".

== Personal life ==
Joyce lives in Cambridge with her husband and two sons. She had unexplained infertility and used IVF to conceive her children.

Joyce was raised Irish Catholic, but is now an atheist. She says of her atheism, "It wasn't because I was unhappy... My convent school was actually quite a nice place, and I loved our RE [religious education] lessons... I just don't think it's true."
