= Dominick Joyce =

Irish cricketer (born 1981)

Personal information
- Full name: Dominick Ignatius Joyce
- Born: 14 June 1981 (age 45); Dublin, Ireland
- Batting: Right-handed
- Relatives: Helen Joyce (sister); Gus Joyce (brother); Ed Joyce (brother); Isobel Joyce (sister); John Anderson (brother-in-law); Cecelia Joyce (sister)

International information
- National side: Ireland
- ODI debut (cap 5): 13 June 2006 v England
- Last ODI: 24 June 2007 v South Africa

Domestic team information
- Years: Team
- 2001–2007: Ireland

Career statistics
Competition	ODI	FC	LA
Matches	3	6	20
Runs scored	29	303	256
Batting average	9.66	30.30	13.47
100s/50s	0/0	0/2	0/2
Top score	18	61	67
Balls bowled	0	66	6
Wickets	–	1	0
Bowling average	–	31.00	–
5 wickets in innings	–	0	–
10 wickets in match	–	0	–
Best bowling	–	1/26	–
Catches/stumpings	1/–	2/–	8/–
- Source: Cricket Archive, 16 September 2009

Dominick Ignatius Joyce (born 14 June 1981) is a former Irish cricketer. A right-handed batsman, he has played 69 times for the Ireland cricket team including three One Day Internationals, six international matches and twenty List A matches. He has also played second XI cricket for Middlesex and Somerset.

== Playing career ==
Joyce's first taste of international cricket came in 2000, when he played for Ireland in the Under-19 World Cup. He first played for Ireland at senior level in July 2000 in the European Championship in Scotland. This was followed by a three-match series against the MCC in May 2001 and the 2001 ICC Trophy. This was followed by a match against Australia and an appearance in the Triple Crown Tournament. He made his List A debut in August 2001 against Wiltshire in the C & G Trophy.

In 2002 he played against the West Indies A team before taking part in the European Championship in Northern Ireland. The year finished with matches against the MCC and Berkshire. In 2003 he played matches against Denmark, an England Amateur XI, South Africa and Zimbabwe.

He again played in the European Championship in 2004 and the following month was named in the Ireland squad for the 2004 European Under-23 Championship, though the tournament was abandoned due to rain. He then played for Ireland in two matches against Bangladesh. Earlier in the year, he made his first-class debut, playing against the Netherlands in the ICC Intercontinental Cup.

In 2005, he played against Loughborough UCCE, Warwickshire and Yorkshire before playing in the 2005 ICC Trophy. This was followed by Intercontinental Cup games against Scotland, the Netherlands, the United Arab Emirates and Kenya.

The following year, he played several matches in Ireland's C & G Trophy campaign, and an Intercontinental Cup match against Namibia before making his ODI debut against England in what was Ireland's first ODI. His brother Ed also made his ODI debut in that match, but he was playing for England. It was an unsuccessful ODI debut for Dominick, as he was bowled for a duck by Steve Harmison. He did not represent Ireland again for just under a year, when he was dismissed for 10 in a Friends Provident Trophy fixture against Middlesex at Clontarf, falling to a disputed catch by his brother Ed. He resumed his ODI career with a couple of appearances in Ireland's June internationals against India and South Africa at Stormont, scoring 18 and 11 in the respective fixtures.

== Statistics ==
In all matches for Ireland, Joyce has scored 1480 runs at an average of 23.49, scoring eleven half-centuries, the highest of which was an innings of 67 against Wiltshire in August 2001. He has taken just one wicket, against the Netherlands in July 2004.

== Family ==
Joyce is one of nine children of James "Jimmy" and Maureen Joyce.

Joyce comes from a cricketing family. His brothers Ed and Gus have also played cricket for Ireland, with Ed also playing for England. His sisters Isobel and Cecelia have both played for the Irish women's team. His mother Maureen was a cricket scorer. She was also scorer in two WODIs in 2002 when New Zealand women toured to Netherlands and Ireland.
