= Ciara Lucey =

Personal information
- Born: Dublin, Ireland

Sport
- Sport: Camogie
- Position: Centre field
Club*
Years	Club	Apps (scores)
	Ballyboden St Enda's	?
Inter-county**
Years	County	Apps (scores)
	Dublin	?
- * club appearances and scores correct as of (16:31, 30 June 2010 (UTC)). **Inter County team apps and scores correct as of (16:31, 30 June 2010 (UTC)).

Ciara Lucey is a camogie player, winner of an All-Star award in 2005.

One of just three Dublin players to win awards in the history of the scheme, she was play-maker as Dublin won the All-Ireland Junior Camogie Championship in 2005 for the first time in 30 years.

Lucey's great-grandfather, Séamus Gardiner, was President of the GAA from 1943 to 1946. Her father, Peter Lucey, was manager of the Dublin team that won the 2005 All-Ireland Junior Camogie Championship. Her sister, Emer Lucey has also played senior camogie with Ballyboden St Enda's and Dublin.
