= Gus Joyce =

Irish cricketer (born 1974)

Personal information
- Full name: Augustine Joyce
- Born: 10 August 1974 (age 52); Dublin, Ireland
- Batting: Right-handed
- Role: Wicket-keeper
- Relatives: Helen Joyce (sister); Ed Joyce (brother); Dominick Joyce (brother); Isobel Joyce (sister); John Anderson (brother-in-law); Cecelia Joyce (sister)

Domestic team information
- Years: Team
- 2000: Ireland

Career statistics
Competition	First-class
Matches	1
Runs scored	31
Batting average	15.50
100s/50s	0/0
Top score	29
Catches/stumpings	2/0
- Source: Cricinfo, 8 February 2019

Augustine "Gus" Joyce (born 10 August 1974) is an Irish cricketer born in Dublin. A right-handed batsman and wicket-keeper, he played three times for the Ireland cricket team in 2000, a first-class match against Scotland and matches against Italy and Scotland in the European Championship.

== Family ==
Joyce is one of nine children of James "Jimmy" and Maureen Joyce. Other members of his family have played cricket much more for Ireland. Brothers Dominick and Ed have also played for Ireland, with Ed also playing for England. His sisters Cecelia and Isobel have played for the Irish women's team. His mother Maureen was a cricket scorer. She was also scorer in two WODIs in 2002 when New Zealand women toured to Netherlands and Ireland.
