= Kamal Merchant =

Pakistani cricketer, coach and umpire

Personal information
- Born: Karachi, Pakistan
- Batting: Right-handed
- Bowling: Right-arm medium

Domestic team information
- Years: Team
- Faisalabad
- Karachi

Career statistics
Competition	First-class	List A
Matches	95	42
Runs scored	2,927	211
Batting average	27.10	13.18
100s/50s	1/14	0/0
Top score	112	43
Balls bowled	7,736	1,907
Wickets	118	51
Bowling average	23.80	20.94
5 wickets in innings	4	1
10 wickets in match	0	0
Best bowling	6/69	5/11
Catches/stumpings	37/–	8/–
- Source: CricInfo, 20 June 2021

Kamal Merchant (born 2 December 1956) is a former Pakistani domestic cricketer, coach and umpire. In 2021, he was granted Irish citizenship.

== Playing career ==
Merchant played in 95 first class games in his career from 1974 to 1998. He scored 2927 runs at an average of 27.10 with 12 50s and 1 hundred. Merchant was far more successful as a bowler where he took 118 wickets at an average of 23.80 and an economy rate of 2.17 with his best figures being 6/69.

== Coaching career ==
While playing domestic cricket in Pakistan, Merchant also played in the Northern Cricket Union of Ireland for nine years from 1984. After retiring, Merchant went back to Ireland and started coaching youth teams. Future Ireland international Harry Tector, credited Merchant with helping him in his development. In 2013, Merchant's work was acknowledged with him being nominated for coach of the year.

== Umpiring career ==
In addition to coaching after retiring, Merchant also became an umpire. He was scheduled to umpire in a ODI between Pakistan and Sri Lanka but did not for unknown reasons. However Merchant did umpire in a Women's ODI between Pakistan and South Africa. Merchant also stood in many important domestic games, including the 2013-14 National T20 Cup final, where Merchant was criticized for an incorrect decision against Umar Akmal. In light of this, Merchant was backed by former Pakistan batsman and captain Javed Miandad who said that he should be backed because of his knowledge of the game and his quality of making fair judgements.

== Personal life ==
Merchant has four daughters with his wife Najma. Heena, Tayyaba, Amna and Mehk In February 2021, he was granted Irish citizenship.
