= Emer Lucey =

Personal information
- Born: 1988 (age 37–38)

Sport
- Sport: Field hockey
- Position: Defender
Youth career
- Years: Team
- 200x–200x: Our Lady's, Terenure
Senior career
Years	Team	Caps	Goals
200x–	Railway Union	-	-
National team
Years	Team	Caps	Goals
2008–	Ireland A		-

Emer Lucey is a Women's Irish Hockey League player. During the early 2010s she was member of the Railway Union team that won three leagues titles. In 2012–13 Lucey was also captain of the Railway Union team that won a national double, winning both the league and the Irish Senior Cup. Lucey has also played senior camogie with Ballyboden St Enda's and Dublin.

== GAA family ==
Lucey's great-grandfather, Séamus Gardiner, was President of the GAA from 1943 to 1946. Her father, Peter Lucey, was manager of the Dublin team that won the 2005 All-Ireland Junior Camogie Championship. Her sister, Ciara Lucey has also played senior camogie with Ballyboden St Enda's and Dublin.

== Field hockey ==
=== Our Lady's, Terenure ===
Lucey captained the Our Lady's, Terenure team that won the 2005 Leinster Schoolgirls' Premier League. In the final they defeated a High School, Dublin team featuring Nicola Daly and Alison Meeke 2–0.

=== Railway Union ===
In 2009–10, together with Cecelia and Isobel Joyce, Kate McKenna and Nicola Evans, Lucey was a member of the Railway Union team that won the Women's Irish Hockey League title. Lucey also played for Railway Union in the 2010 Irish Senior Cup final as they lost to Loreto after a penalty shoot-out. In 2012–13 Lucey was captain of the Railway Union team that won a national double, winning both the Women's Irish Hockey League and the Irish Senior Cup. In the cup final Lucey scored Railway Union's opening goal as they defeated UCD 3–2. Grace O'Flanagan was also a member of this team. Lucey was also a member of the Railway Union team that finished as league runners up in 2013–14. Lucey has also represented Railway Union in European club competitions, including the 2014 EuroHockey Club Champions Cup.

=== Ireland A ===
Since 2008, Lucey has been included in Ireland A squads.

== Camogie ==
Emer Lucey
Personal information
- Native name: Eimear Ní Luasaigh (Irish)

Sport
- Sport: Camogie
- Position: Corner forward
Club
- Years: Club
- 200x–200x: Ballyboden St Enda's
Inter-county
- Years: County
- 2010–: Dublin

=== Clubs ===
In 2008 Lucey scored the winning goal as Ballyboden St Enda's defeated Rathnure in the Leinster Senior Club Camogie Championship final. Her teammates included her sister, Ciara Lucey, and Rachel Ruddy. Lucey has also won Dublin league and championship titles with Ballyboden.

=== Inter-county ===
In 2005 Lucey and her sister, Ciara Lucey, were members of the Dublin team that won the All-Ireland Junior Camogie Championship. She scored Dublin's opening goal as they defeated Clare 2–9 to 1–4. The team was managed by their father, Peter Lucey. Lucey also played for the Dublin senior camogie team.

== Teacher ==
Lucey has worked as a primary school teacher at St. Mary's N.S. in Sandyford.

== Honours ==
=== Field hockey ===
Railway Union

- Women's Irish Hockey League
  - Winners: 2009–10, 2011–12, 2012–13
  - Runners Up: 2013–14
- Irish Senior Cup
  - Winners: 2012–13
  - Runners Up: 2009–10

=== Camogie ===
Dublin

- All-Ireland Junior Camogie Championship
  - Winners: 2005

Ballyboden St Enda's

- Leinster Senior Club Camogie Championship
  - Winners: 2008
- Dublin Senior Club Camogie Championships
  - Winners: 2006, 2008, 2010, 2011, 2012, 2013
- Senior A Dublin Camogie League
  - Winners: 2009, 2010
