= Neil McGarrell =

West Indian cricketer (born 1972)

Personal information
- Full name: Neil Christopher McGarrell
- Born: 12 July 1972 (age 54); Georgetown, Guyana
- Nickname: Neilman
- Batting: Right-handed
- Bowling: Slow left-arm orthodox

International information
- National side: West Indies (1998-2001)
- Test debut (cap 239): 6 April 2001 v South Africa
- Last Test: 13 November 2001 v Sri Lanka
- ODI debut (cap 87): 8 April 1998 v England
- Last ODI: 15 December 2001 v Sri Lanka

Domestic team information
- Years: Team
- 1995–2008: Guyana

Career statistics
Competition	Test	ODI	FC	LA
Matches	4	17	84	88
Runs scored	61	60	2,127	698
Batting average	15.25	7.50	21.48	21.15
100s/50s	0/0	0/0	0/12	0/1
Top score	33	19	88	51*
Balls bowled	1,212	859	20,546	4,337
Wickets	17	15	276	94
Bowling average	26.64	45.40	26.27	30.02
5 wickets in innings	0	0	12	1
10 wickets in match	0	0	3	0
Best bowling	4/23	3/32	7/71	5/20
Catches/stumpings	2/–	9/–	91/–	30/–
- Source: ESPNCricinfo, 1 September 2017

Neil Christopher McGarrell (born 12 July 1972 in Georgetown, Demerara, Guyana) is a former West Indian cricketer.

== International career ==
More specifically a slow left arm bowler, McGarrell played four Tests in 2001, taking 17 wickets. He also played 17 One Day Internationals for the West Indies, but played his last international in the 2001–02 against Sri Lanka at Kandy.

== Domestic career ==
McGarrell also had short spells as captain of Guyana in West Indian domestic cricket when regular captains Carl Hooper and Shivnarine Chanderpaul were absent due to international duties.

== United States cricket ==
Because he was consistently ignored for West Indies selection in cricket since 2001 McGarrell announced that he had switched to the United States national cricket team because there was more opportunities it is understood he will play in World Cricket League Division Three in 2011
