= Sarel Burger =

Namibian cricketer (born 1983)

Personal information
- Full name: Sarel Francois Burger
- Born: 13 February 1983 (age 43); Windhoek, South West Africa
- Batting: Right-handed
- Bowling: Right-arm medium-fast
- Role: All-rounder

International information
- National side: Namibia
- ODI debut (cap 14): 19 February 2003 v England
- Last ODI: 3 March 2003 v Netherlands

Career statistics
Competition	ODI	FC	LA	T20
Matches	2	67	115	63
Runs scored	11	2,847	2,285	1,019
Batting average	5.50	24.97	23.31	22.64
100s/50s	0/0	2/19	0/14	0/4
Top score	6	135	91	56
Balls bowled	66	8,735	4,602	1,149
Wickets	0	144	117	46
Bowling average	–	25.45	26.86	26.78
5 wickets in innings	–	5	2	0
10 wickets in match	–	0	0	0
Best bowling	–	6/60	5/23	4/29
Catches/stumpings	1/–	51/–	45/–	24/–
- Source: ESPNcricinfo, 22 June 2017

Sarel Francois Burger (born 13 February 1983) is a Namibian former cricketer, who has played for Namibia's national cricket team. He is a right-handed batsman and a right-arm medium-fast bowler.

He played in two One Day Internationals in the Cricket World Cup in 2003. He also participated in List A cricket between 2001 and 2004 and participated in the ICC Trophy in July 2005. His brother Louis Burger played for Namibia in the World Cup, while Bernie Burger has played in the ICC Trophy.

In January 2018, he was named as captain of Namibia's squad for the 2018 ICC World Cricket League Division Two tournament.

In February 2018, he retired from cricket, after playing for Namibia against Free State in the 2017–18 CSA Provincial One-Day Challenge.
