= Cecelia Joyce =

Irish cricketer

Personal information
- Full name: Cecelia Nora Isobel Mary Joyce
- Born: 25 July 1983 (age 43); Wicklow, Ireland
- Batting: Right-handed
- Bowling: Right arm leg break
- Relatives: Helen Joyce (sister); Gus Joyce (brother); Ed Joyce (brother); Dominick Joyce (brother); Isobel Joyce (twin sister); John Anderson (brother-in-law)

International information
- National side: Ireland (2001–2018)
- ODI debut (cap 44): 14 July 2001 v Australia
- Last ODI: 10 June 2018 v New Zealand
- T20I debut (cap 5): 27 June 2008 v West Indies
- Last T20I: 17 November 2018 v New Zealand

Domestic team information
- Years: Team
- 2015–2018: Dragons
- 2019: Scorchers
- 2021: Typhoons

Career statistics
Competition	WODI	WT20I
Matches	57	43
Runs scored	1,172	459
Batting average	23.44	19.38
100s/50s	0/3	0/1
Top score	78*	60
Balls bowled	130	18
Wickets	1	1
Bowling average	135.00	31.00
5 wickets in innings	0	0
10 wickets in match	0	0
Best bowling	1/12	1/31
Catches/stumpings	11/–	7/1
- Source: ESPNcricinfo, 27 May 2021

Cecelia Nora Isobel Mary Joyce (born 25 July 1983) is an Irish cricketer. A right-handed batter and leg break bowler, she played 57 One-Day Internationals and 43 Twenty20 Internationals for Ireland between 2001 and 2018. She played in her final match for Ireland in November 2018, during the 2018 ICC Women's World Twenty20 tournament. In 2021, Joyce returned to competitive cricket to play for Typhoons in the Women's Super Series after injuries to players in the original squad.

== Playing career ==
Joyce made her ODI debut for Ireland against Australia on 14 July 2001, in the second match of a series. She also played in the third match of the series, and against Scotland in the European Championship. She next played in 2003 IWCC Trophy, held in the Netherlands in July 2003.

The following year, she played three ODIs against New Zealand in Dublin and in 2005, played in the World Cup in South Africa. She also played against Australia and in the European Championship in 2005. She played four ODIs in 2006, two each against India and the Netherlands.

In June 2018, she was named in Ireland's squad for the 2018 ICC Women's World Twenty20 Qualifier tournament. In October 2018, she was named in Ireland's squad for the 2018 ICC Women's World Twenty20 tournament in the West Indies.

== Family ==
Joyce is one of nine children of James "Jimmy" and Maureen Joyce.

Joyce comes from a cricketing family. Her twin sister Isobel has played Test and ODI cricket for Ireland, whilst her three brothers Dominick, Ed and Gus have played for the Ireland men's team. Ed has also played for England. Her mother Maureen was a cricket scorer. She was also scorer in two WODIs in 2002 when New Zealand women toured to Netherlands and Ireland.

Her sister Helen was Britain Editor at The Economist.

== Field hockey ==
In 2009–10, together with her sister Isobel, Kate McKenna, Emer Lucey and Nicola Evans, Joyce was a member of the Railway Union team that won the Women's Irish Hockey League title.
