= Kate McKenna =

Irish cricketer and field hockey player

Personal information
- Full name: Kate McKenna
- Born: 27 September 1989 (age 37); Dublin, Ireland
- Batting: Right-handed
- Bowling: Right-arm medium
- Role: Batter

International information
- National side: Ireland (2014)
- T20I debut (cap 30): 19 January 2014 v Pakistan
- Last T20I: 10 September 2014 v South Africa

Domestic team information
- Years: Team
- 2015–2016: Typhoons

Career statistics
Competition	WT20I	WLA	WT20
Matches	7	15	18
Runs scored	22	202	106
Batting average	11.00	18.36	21.20
100s/50s	0/0	0/1	0/0
Top score	9*	69*	42
Balls bowled	–	48	–
Wickets	–	0	–
Bowling average	–	–	–
5 wickets in innings	–	0	–
10 wickets in match	–	0	–
Best bowling	–	–	–
Catches/stumpings	2/–	4/–	3/–
- Source: CricketArchive, 28 May 2021

Kate McKenna (born 27 September 1989) is an Irish former cricketer who played as a right-handed batter. She appeared in 7 Twenty20 Internationals for Ireland in 2014. She played in the Super 3s for Typhoons.

== Field hockey ==
In 2009–10, together with Cecelia and Isobel Joyce, Emer Lucey and Nicola Evans, McKenna was a member of the Railway Union team that won the Women's Irish Hockey League title.
