= Isobel Joyce =

Irish cricketer

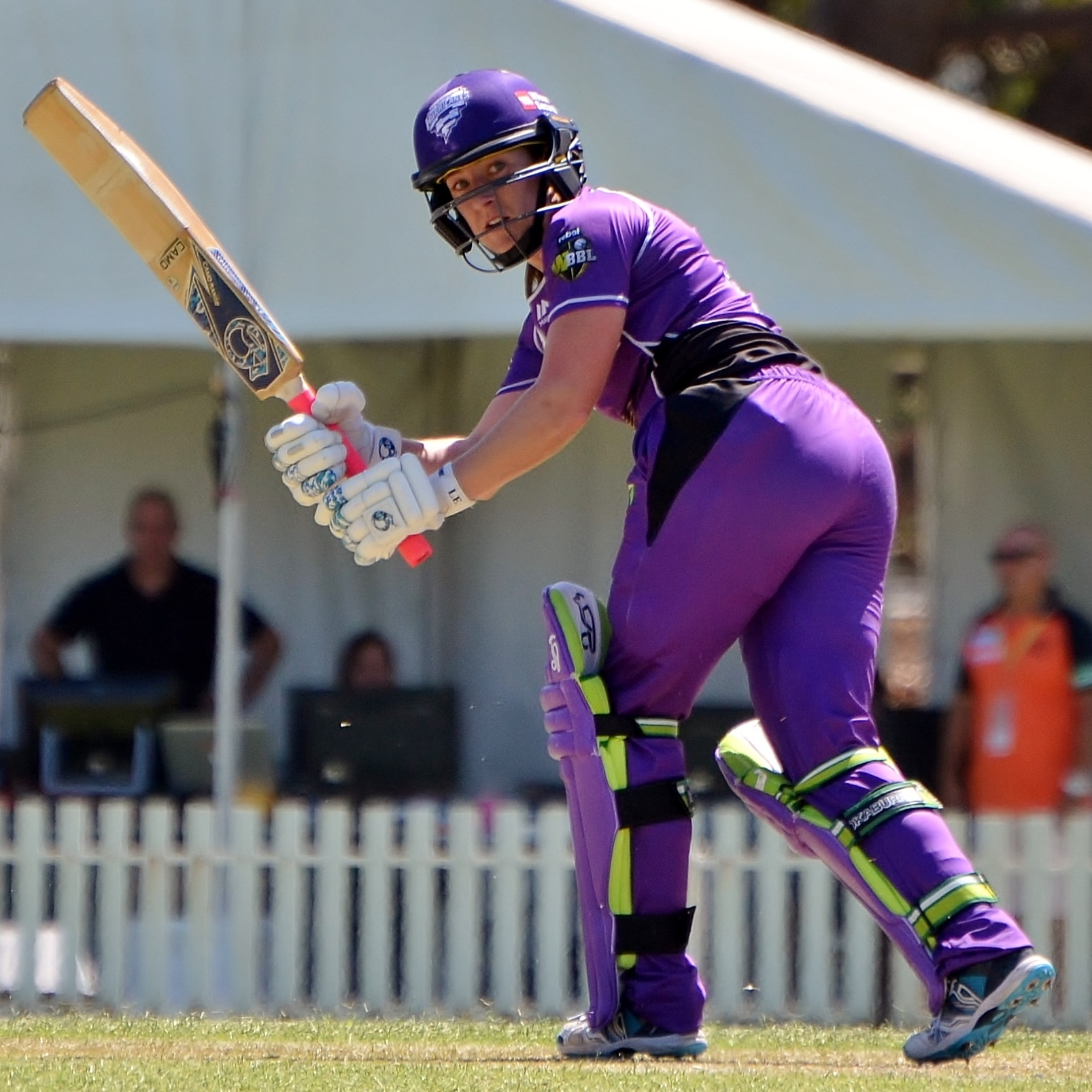
- Joyce batting for the Hobart Hurricanes, 2018

Personal information
- Full name: Isobel Mary Helen Cecilia Joyce
- Born: 25 July 1983 (age 43); Wicklow, Ireland
- Batting: Right-handed
- Bowling: Left arm medium
- Role: All-rounder
- Relatives: John Anderson (husband); Helen Joyce (sister); Gus Joyce (brother); Ed Joyce (brother); Dominick Joyce (brother); Cecelia Joyce (twin sister)

International information
- National side: Ireland (1999–2018)
- Only Test (cap 3): 30 July 2000 v Pakistan
- ODI debut (cap 39): 26 June 1999 v India
- Last ODI: 8 June 2018 v New Zealand
- ODI shirt no.: 9
- T20I debut (cap 6): 27 June 2008 v West Indies
- Last T20I: 17 November 2018 v New Zealand

Domestic team information
- Years: Team
- 2015–2019: Scorchers
- 2016/17–2017/18: Tasmania
- 2016/17–2017/18: Hobart Hurricanes

Career statistics
Competition	WTest	WODI	WT20I	WLA
Matches	1	79	55	136
Runs scored	–	995	944	2,602
Batting average	–	17.15	20.08	26.28
100s/50s	–	0/4	0/1	1/15
Top score	–	67*	56*	127*
Balls bowled	67	3,118	1,046	5,026
Wickets	6	66	33	131
Bowling average	3.50	30.45	30.81	24.35
5 wickets in innings	1	0	0	2
10 wickets in match	0	0	0	0
Best bowling	6/21	4/20	3/16	7/10
Catches/stumpings	1/–	23/–	16/–	49/–
- Source: CricketArchive, 27 May 2021

Isobel Mary Helen Cecilia Joyce (born 25 July 1983) is an Irish former cricketer. She played as a right-handed batter and left-arm medium pace bowler. She appeared in one Test match, 79 One Day Internationals and 55 Twenty20 Internationals for Ireland between 1999 and 2018. She played in her final match for Ireland in November 2018, during the 2018 ICC Women's World Twenty20 tournament. She played domestic cricket for Scorchers, Tasmania and Hobart Hurricanes.

== Playing career ==
Joyce made her debut for Ireland in a One-Day International (ODI) against India in Milton Keynes in June 1999. She then played in the Women's European Championship the following month. In 2000, she played four ODIs against Pakistan and played her only Test match, also against Pakistan. This has been Ireland's women's team's only Test match to date. Joyce played in the Women's World Cup in New Zealand towards the end of the year.

Since the 2000 World Cup, she has played ODIs against Australia, India, the Netherlands and New Zealand, also playing in the European Championship in 2001 and 2005, and in the IWCC Trophy in the Netherlands in 2003.

In April 2016, she stepped down as captain of the Ireland women's cricket team following their exit at the group stages of the 2016 ICC World Twenty20 in India. She captained Ireland in 62 matches across all formats of the games including two ICC Women's World Twenty20 tournaments.

She was part of Ireland's squad for the 2018 ICC Women's World Twenty20 Qualifier tournament. In October 2018, she was named in Ireland's squad for the 2018 ICC Women's World Twenty20 tournament in the West Indies. The following month, she was named the Female Club Player of the Year at the annual Cricket Ireland Awards.

== Family ==
Joyce is one of nine children of James "Jimmy" and Maureen Joyce. Joyce comes from a cricketing family. Her twin sister Cecelia has also played for the Irish women's team, whilst three of her brothers, Dominick, Ed and Gus have played for the Ireland men's team. Ed has also played cricket for England. Her mother Maureen was a cricket scorer. She was also scorer in two WODIs in 2002 when New Zealand women toured to Netherlands and Ireland.

Isobel married former Irish cricketer John Anderson. Thus they became one of the very few cricketing couples to play international cricket.

== Field hockey ==
In 2009–10, together with her sister Cecelia, Kate McKenna, Emer Lucey and Nicola Evans, Joyce was a member of the Railway Union team that won the Women's Irish Hockey League title.
