= 2017 Women's EuroHockey Championship squads =

This article displays the rosters for the teams competing at the 2017 Women's EuroHockey Nations Championship. Each team had to submit 18 players.

== Pool A ==
=== Belgium ===
The following 18 players were selected in the Belgium squad.

Head Coach: Niels Thijssen

2. Sophie Limauge
3. Louise Cavenaile
4. Aline Fobe
6. Anouk Raes (C)
7. Judith Vandermeiren
11. Joanne Peeters
13. Alix Gerniers
15. Anne-Sophie Weyns
16. Louise Versavel
17. Michelle Struijk
18. Maureen Beernaert
19. Barbara Nelen
21. Aisling D'Hooghe (GK)
22. Stephanie Vanden Borre
23. Elena Sotgiu (GK)
25. Pauline Leclef
26. Lien Hillewaert
27. Jill Boon

=== Czech Republic ===
The following 18 players were selected in the Czech Republic squad.

Head Coach: Filip Neusser

1. Barbora Čecháková (GK)
2. Katerina Lacina
3. Anna Kolarova
4. Karolína Jirsová
5. Jindriska Reichlová
6. Klára Poloprutská
7. Klára Hanzlová
8. Kamila Dukátová
11. Tereza Mejzlíková
12. Veronika Nováková
13. Adéla Lehovcová (C)
15. Barbora Haklová
16. Andrea Vančurová (GK)
17. Veronika Decsoyová
18. Anna Vorlová
19. Nikol Babická
20. Barbora Kavánková
21. Natálie Nováková

=== Netherlands ===
The following 18 players were selected in the Netherlands squad.

Head Coach: Alyson Annan

1. Anne Veenendaal (GK)
4. Kitty van Male
5. Malou Pheninckx
6. Laurien Leurink
7. Xan de Waard
8. Marloes Keetels (C)
9. Carlien Dirkse van den Heuvel
10. Kelly Jonker
11. Maria Verschoor
12. Lidewij Welten
13. Caia van Maasakker
15. Frédérique Matla
17. Ireen van den Assem
18. Pien Sanders
20. Laura Nunnink
21. Lauren Stam
22. Josine Koning (GK)
23. Margot van Geffen

=== Spain ===
The following 18 players were selected in the Spain squad.

Head Coach: Adrian Lock

3. Rocío Ybarra (C)
7. Carlota Petchamé
8. Carola Salvatella
9. María López
10. Berta Bonastre
11. Cristina Guinea
12. Carmen Cano
14. María Tost
15. Maialen García
16. María Ruiz (GK)
17. Lola Riera
18. Julia Pons
20. Xantal Giné
21. Beatriz Pérez
24. Begoña García
28. Marta Segú
29. Lucía Jiménez
30. Melanie García (GK)

== Pool B ==
=== England ===
The following 18 players were selected in the England squad.

Head Coach: David Ralph

1. Maddie Hinch (GK)
2. Zoe Shipperley
4. Laura Unsworth
5. Sarah Haycroft
6. Anna Toman
7. Hannah Martin
9. Susannah Townsend
13. Ellie Rayer
15. Alex Danson (C)
16. Emily Defroand
18. Giselle Ansley
19. Sophie Bray
20. Hollie Webb
21. Ellie Watton
23. Amy Tennant (GK)
24. Shona McCallin
26. Lily Owsley
27. Jo Hunter

=== Germany ===
The following 18 players were selected in the Germany squad.

Head Coach: Jamilon Mülders

4. Nike Lorenz
5. Selin Oruz
8. Anne Schröder
12. Charlotte Stapenhorst
13. Teresa Martin-Pelegrina
14. Janne Müller-Wieland (C)
15. Noelle Rother (GK)
16. Naomi Heyn
17. Jana Teschke
20. Julia Ciupka (GK)
21. Franzisca Hauke
22. Cécile Pieper
23. Marie Mävers
25. Pia Grambusch
26. Camille Nobis
28. Nina Notman
29. Pia-Sophie Oldhafer
30. Hanna Granitzki

=== Ireland ===
The following 18 players were selected in the Ireland squad.

Head Coach: Graham Shaw

1. Grace O'Flanagan (GK)
2. Clodagh Cassin (GK)
4. Yvonne O'Byrne
8. Nicola Evans
9. Katie Mullan (C)
10. Shirley McCay
12. Elena Tice
14. Emily Beatty
15. Gillian Pinder
16. Sinead Loughran
18. Roisin Upton
20. Chloe Watkins
22. Nicola Daly
23. Hannah Matthews
26. Anna O'Flanagan
27. Zoe Wilson
28. Deirdre Duke
30. Alison Meeke

=== Scotland ===
The following 18 players were selected in the Scotland squad.

Head Coach: Graham Shaw

2. Nicola Cochrane (GK)
4. Mairi Drummond
6. Becky Ward (C)
7. Amy Brodie
8. Amy Costello
9. Katie Robertson
10. Sarah Robertson
12. Charlotte Watson
14. Kareena Cuthbert
17. Sarah Jamieson
19. Nikki Lloyd
20. Millie Brown
21. Alison Howie
25. Kate Holmes
26. Robyn Collins
27. Fiona Burnet
28. Rebecca Condie
29. Amy Gibson (GK)
