= 2019 Women's EuroHockey Championship squads =

This article displays the rosters for the teams competing at the 2019 Women's EuroHockey Nations Championship. Each team had to submit 18 players.

== Pool A ==
=== Belgium ===
The squad was announced on 6 August 2019.

Head coach: Niels Thiessen

2. Sophie Limauge
3. Abigail Raye
4. Aline Fobe
7. Judith Vandermeiren
8. Emma Puvrez
10. Louise Versavel
13. Alix Gerniers
14. Emilie Sinia
15. Anne-Sophie Weyns
17. Michelle Struijk
19. Barbara Nelen (C)
21. Aisling D'Hooghe (GK)
22. Stephanie Vanden Borre
25. Pauline Leclef
26. Lien Hillewaert
27. Jill Boon
29. Elodie Picard (GK)
30. Ambre Ballenghien

=== Netherlands ===
The squad was announced on 1 August 2019.

Head coach: (Australia) Alyson Annan

1. Anne Veenendaal (GK)
3. Sanne Koolen
5. Malou Pheninckx
6. Laurien Leurink
7. Xan de Waard
8. Marloes Keetels
10. Kelly Jonker
11. Maria Verschoor
12. Lidewij Welten
13. Caia van Maasakker
15. Frédérique Matla
17. Ireen van den Assem
19. Marijn Veen
20. Laura Nunnink
21. Lauren Stam
22. Josine Koning (GK)
23. Margot van Geffen
24. Eva de Goede (C)

=== Russia ===
The squad was announced on 14 August 2019.

Head coach: Svetlana Ivanova

1. Angelina Iashina (GK)
2. Svetlana Salamatina (GK)
3. Viktoriia Chepurnova
4. Alina Khalimova
5. Kristina Shumilina
6. Kseniaa Koroleva
7. Svetlana Eroshina
10. Iuliia Cheplygina
11. Anastasia Kolpakova
12. Mariia Bordolimova
14. Dayana Yushkova
15. Margarita Drepenkina (C)
18. Viktoriia Aleksandrina (GK)
19. Bogdana Sadovaia
21. Kseniia Sanina
22. Varvara Makeeva
23. Aleksandra Leonova
29. Evgeniia Sorokina

=== Spain ===
The squad was announced on 13 August 2019.

Head coach: (England) Adrian Lock

1. María Ruiz (GK)
4. Clara Ycart
7. Carlota Petchamé
9. María López
10. Berta Bonastre
11. Cristina Guinea
12. Carmen Cano
13. Belén Iglesias
14. María Tost
17. Lola Riera
18. Júlia Pons
19. Begoña García
21. Beatriz Pérez
23. Georgina Oliva (C)
24. Alejandra Torres-Quevedo
28. Marta Segú
29. Lucía Jiménez
32. Melanie García (GK)

== Pool B ==
=== Belarus ===
Head coach: (Netherlands) Herman Kruis

1. Tatsiana Liavonava (GK)
2. Hanna Zhylevich
3. Kristina Mitskevich
4. Ulyana Kasabutskaya
5. Krestsina Papkova
6. Maryia Halinouskaya
7. Natallia Shtsin
8. Darya Belavusava
9. Xenia Efimencova
10. Yuliya Kurhanskaya
11. Volha Skryba
12. Sviatlana Bahushevich
13. Viktoryia Sidarava
14. Nadzeya Silitskaya
15. Nastassia Syrayezhka (C)
17. Maryna Nikitsina
19. Karyna Syddykava
20. Maryna Navitskaya (GK)

=== England ===
The squad was announced on 7 August 2019.

Head coach: (Australia) Mark Hager

1. Maddie Hinch (GK)
4. Laura Unsworth
5. Sarah Haycroft
6. Anna Toman
7. Hannah Martin
9. Susannah Townsend
11. Suzy Petty
13. Ellie Rayer
14. Tessa Howard
16. Emily Defroand
18. Giselle Ansley
20. Hollie Webb (C)
23. Amy Tennant (GK)
24. Shona McCallin
26. Lily Owsley
27. Jo Hunter
31. Grace Balsdon
33. Isabelle Petter

=== Germany ===
The squad was announced on 25 July 2019.

Head coach: (Belgium) Xavier Reckinger

2. Kira Horn
3. Amelie Wortmann
4. Nike Lorenz
5. Selin Oruz
6. Hannah Gablać
8. Anne Schröder
9. Elisa Gräve
11. Lena Micheel
14. Janne Müller-Wieland (C)
15. Nathalie Kubalski (GK)
16. Sonja Zimmermann
20. Julia Sonntag (GK)
21. Franzisca Hauke
22. Cécile Pieper
24. Pia Maertens
25. Viktoria Huse
28. Rebecca Grote
30. Hanna Granitzki

=== Ireland ===
Head coach: (Australia) Sean Dancer

No.	Pos.	Player	Date of birth (age)	Caps	Club
1	GK	Ayeisha McFerran	10 January 1996 (aged 23)	93	(Netherlands) SV Kampong
6	MF	Roisin Upton	1 April 1994 (aged 25)	66	(Ireland) Catholic Institute
8	FW	Nicola Evans	17 January 1990 (aged 29)	187	(Germany) Uhlenhorster HC
9	FW	Katie Mullan (C)	7 April 1994 (aged 25)	182	(Ireland) Ballymoney
10	MF	Shirley McCay	7 June 1988 (aged 31)	295	(Ireland) Pegasus
12	DF	Elena Tice	16 November 1997 (aged 21)	99	(Ireland) UCD Ladies
15	MF	Gillian Pinder	5 May 1992 (aged 27)	160	(Ireland) Pembroke Wanderers
18	DF	Bethany Barr	11 June 1995 (aged 24)	17	(Ireland) Belfast Harlequins
20	MF	Chloe Watkins	7 March 1992 (aged 27)	216	(Ireland) Monkstown
21	MF	Lizzie Colvin	4 January 1990 (aged 29)	185	(Ireland) Belfast Harlequins
22	FW	Nicola Daly	3 April 1988 (aged 31)	186	(Ireland) Loreto
23	DF	Hannah Matthews	24 March 1991 (aged 28)	137	(Ireland) Loreto
24	GK	Elizabeth Murphy	25 June 1998 (aged 21)	9	(Ireland) Loreto
25	FW	Sarah Hawkshaw	4 November 1995 (aged 23)	23	(Ireland) Railway Union
26	FW	Anna O'Flanagan	18 February 1990 (aged 29)	197	(Ireland) Muckross
27	DF	Zoe Wilson	15 February 1997 (aged 21)	99	(Ireland) Randalstown
28	FW	Deirdre Duke	9 June 1992 (aged 27)	132	(Germany) Düsseldorfer HTC
30	MF	Alison Meeke	7 June 1991 (aged 28)	143	(Ireland) Loreto
