= Gillian Pinder =

Irish field hockey player (born 1992)

Personal information
- Born: 5 May 1992 (age 34)
- Height: 5 ft 5 in (165 cm)

Sport
- Sport: Field hockey
- Position: Midfielder
Youth career
- Years: Team
- 2005–2011: St. Andrew's College
Senior career
Years	Team	Caps	Goals
200x–2013	Hermes	-	-
2012	→ Syracuse Orange field hockey	-	-
2013–2017	UCD Ladies	-	-
2017–	Pembroke Wanderers	-	-
National team
Years	Team	Caps	Goals
2011–	Ireland	140+	-
Medal record
World Cup
Silver medal – second place	2018 London

Gillian Pinder (born 5 May 1992) is an Ireland women's field hockey international. She was a member of the Ireland team that played in the 2018 Women's Hockey World Cup final. Pinder has also won Irish Senior Cup and Women's Irish Hockey League titles with UCD.

== Early years, family and education ==
Pinder is the daughter of Alan and Mary Pinder. Her father, Alan, is originally from Mullingar. Her sister, Laura, is also a field hockey player and has played for Hermes-Monkstown in the Women's Irish Hockey League and the EuroHockey Club Champions Cup . Pinder was educated at St. Andrew's College, Syracuse University and University College Dublin. She graduated from UCD with a Bachelor of Business and Law.

== Club career ==
=== St. Andrew's College ===
Pinder played field hockey for St. Andrew's College in a team that also included her sister, Laura and Chloe Watkins. She played in three Leinster Schoolgirls' Senior Cup finals, regularly playing against teams that included future Ireland teammates. In the 2007 final, Pinder and Watkins lost 5–0 to an Alexandra College team that featured Nicola Evans. In the 2009 final St. Andrew's faced Loreto, Beaufort and Hannah Matthews. This time St. Andrew's won 2–0 after extra time. In the 2010 final Pinder scored the opening goal in a 2–0 win. Watkins captained St. Andrew's as they defeated an Alexandra College team that featured Deirdre Duke and Emily Beatty. In 2010 Pinder and Watkins were also members of the St. Andrew's College team that won the Kate Russell All-Ireland Schoolgirls Championship, defeating Coláiste Iognáid, Galway 3–1 in the final. On 10 September 2018, after their success at the Women's Hockey World Cup, Watkins and Pinder returned to St. Andrew's to share their experience with the current students at St. Andrew's. Pinder also began managing the hockey programme at St. Andrew's.

=== Hermes ===
In 2008–09 Pinder together with Nicola Evans, Anna O'Flanagan and Chloe Watkins, was a member of the Hermes team that were runners up in the inaugural Women's Irish Hockey League season. Pinder also played for Hermes in the 2010–11 Irish Senior Cup final as Hermes lost 3–1 to Pegasus. Her teammates on this occasion included her sister, Laura, Deirdre Duke and Anna O'Flanagan. In 2012, along with Mary Goode and Audrey O'Flynn, Pinder was a member of the Hermes team that won the Women's EuroHockey Club Champion's Challenge I, defeating Lille Metropole 3–1 in the final.

=== Syracuse Orange ===
In 2012 Pinder attended Syracuse University on a hockey scholarship. She subsequently helped Syracuse Orange win the 2012 Big East Regular Season. She also helped Syracuse reach the 2012 NCAA Division I Field Hockey Championship semi-finals. At Syracuse, together with Emma Russell and Liz McInerney, Pinder formed a forward line that featured three future Ireland internationals.

=== UCD ===
Pinder started playing for UCD in 2013. She subsequently scored for UCD on her Women's Irish Hockey League debut against her former team, Hermes. In 2013–14, together with Nicola Evans, Anna O'Flanagan, Katie Mullan, Emily Beatty and Deirdre Duke she was a member of the UCD team that defeated Pembroke Wanderers 2–0 in the Irish Senior Cup final. In the same season she helped UCD win their first Women's Irish Hockey League title. Pinder also played for UCD in the 2015 EuroHockey Club Champions Cup. In 2016–17 she won a second Irish Senior Cup with UCD when, together with Elena Tice, Katie Mullan and Deirdre Duke, she was a member of the UCD team that defeated Cork Harlequins 1–0 in the final. The 2016–17 season also saw Pinder help UCD win their second Women's Irish Hockey League title. UCD and Pinder subsequently completed a national treble when they also won the EY Champions Trophy after defeating Hermes-Monkstown in a penalty shoot-out.

=== Pembroke Wanderers ===
The 2017–18 season saw Pinder play for Pembroke Wanderers in the Women's Irish Hockey League. Her teammates at Wanderers included Emily Beatty.

== Ireland international ==
Pinder represented Ireland at Under-16, Under-18 and Under-21 levels before making her senior debut. She made her senior international debut on 24 April 2011 against France. In March 2015 Pinder was a member of the Ireland team that won a 2014–15 Women's FIH Hockey World League Round 2 tournament hosted in Dublin, defeating Canada in the final after a penalty shoot-out. She was also a member of the Ireland team that won the 2015 Women's EuroHockey Championship II, defeating the Czech Republic 5–0 in the final. In January 2017 she was also a member of the Ireland team that won a 2016–17 Women's FIH Hockey World League Round 2 tournament in Kuala Lumpur, defeating Malaysia 3–0 in the final. On 12 July 2017 in the 2016–17 Women's FIH Hockey World League Semifinals she scored a "thunderbolt" of a goal against Poland, which was described as one of the highlights of Ireland's 2018 Women's Hockey World Cup qualification campaign.

Pinder represented Ireland at the 2018 Women's Hockey World Cup and was a prominent member of the team that won the silver medal. She featured in all of Ireland's games throughout the tournament, including the pool games against the United States, India, and England, the quarter-final against India, the semi-final against Spain and the final against the Netherlands. In the semi-final against Spain, Pinder scored twice in the penalty shoot-out. After successfully converting the sudden death penalty, she sent Ireland through to the final.

Tournaments	Place
2013 Women's EuroHockey Nations Championship	7th
2014 Women's Hockey Champions Challenge I	2nd
2014–15 Women's FIH Hockey World League	15th
→ 2015 Dublin Tournament	1st
2015 Women's EuroHockey Championship II	1st
2016 Hawke's Bay Cup	5th
2016–17 Women's FIH Hockey World League	13th
→ 2017 Kuala Lumpur Tournament	1st
2017 Women's Four Nations Cup	2nd
2017 Women's EuroHockey Nations Championship	6th
2018 Women's Hockey World Cup	2nd place, silver medalist(s)
2018–19 Women's FIH Series Finals	2nd
2019 Women's EuroHockey Nations Championship	5th

== Occupation ==
Together with Lizzie Colvin, Nicola Evans, Anna O'Flanagan and Deirdre Duke, Pinder was one of five lawyers in the Ireland squad at the 2018 Women's Hockey World Cup.

== Honours ==
Ireland

- Women's Hockey World Cup
  - Runners Up: 2018
- Women's FIH Hockey World League
  - Winners: 2015 Dublin, 2017 Kuala Lumpur
- Women's EuroHockey Championship II
  - Winners: 2015
- Women's Hockey Champions Challenge I
  - Runners Up: 2014
- Women's FIH Hockey Series
  - Runners Up: 2019 Banbridge
- Women's Four Nations Cup
  - Runners Up: 2017

UCD

- Women's Irish Hockey League
  - Winners: 2013–14, 2016–17: 2
- Irish Senior Cup
  - Winners: 2013–14, 2016–17: 2
- EY Champions Trophy
  - Winners: 2017

Syracuse Orange

- Big East Regular Season
  - Winners: 2012

Hermes

- Women's Irish Hockey League
  - Runners Up: 2008–09, 2010–11
- Irish Senior Cup
  - Runners Up: 2010–11
- Women's EuroHockey Club Champion's Challenge I
  - Winners: 2012

St. Andrew's College

- Leinster Schoolgirls' Senior Cup
  - Winners: 2008–09, 2009–10
  - Runners Up: 2006–07
- Kate Russell All-Ireland Schoolgirls Championships
  - Winners: 2010
