= Elena Neill =

Irish sportswoman

Personal information
- Full name: Elena Joy Neill
- Born: 16 November 1997 (age 28) Basingstoke, England
- Height: 1.80 m (5 ft 11 in)

Sport
- Sport: Field hockey
- Position: Defender
Youth career
- Years: Team
- 2008–2016: St Gerard's School
Senior career
Years	Team	Caps	Goals
2014–2016	Loreto	-	-
2016–	UCD Ladies	-	-
National team
Years	Team	Caps	Goals
2015–	Ireland	71+	-
Medal record
FIH World Cup
Silver medal – second place	2018 London
FIH Nations Cup
Silver medal – second place	2023–24 Terrassa

Elena Joy Neill (née Tice, born 16 November 1997), also referred to as Lena Tice, is an Ireland women's field hockey international. She was a member of the Ireland team that played in the 2018 Women's Hockey World Cup final. Tice is also an Ireland women's cricket international. She was a dual Ireland women's cricket and field hockey international by the age of 17. In 2011, she made her senior international cricket debut, aged just 13 years and 272 days. As a result, after Pakistan's Sajjida Shah, Tice became the second youngest player in the history of cricket, male or female, to make their international debut playing in an official One Day International or Twenty20 International. She also represented Ireland at the 2014 ICC Women's World Twenty20. Tice has also won Irish Senior Cup and Women's Irish Hockey League titles with UCD Ladies' Hockey Club.

== Early years and education ==
Tice is the daughter of George Tice and Scarlett Philips. Her father is from England and is a qualified veterinary surgeon who worked as an advisor for Elanco, a multinational food production company. Her mother, like Elena, is a former pupil of St Gerard's School, Bray and has played women's field hockey for the Wicklow Hockey Club senior ladies team in the Leinster League. Tice was born in Basingstoke, Hampshire. She moved with her family to Indianapolis when she was four and then to Vienna when she was six. Because of George Tice's work, the Tice family regularly relocated. When Tice was eight her family eventually settled in Glenealy, County Wicklow, her mother's hometown. Tice has two older brothers - Patrick, an Ireland under-19 cricket international and Dalton, who has played rugby union for Leinster at under-19 level. In addition to cricket and field hockey, in her youth Tice tried out a variety of sports including baseball, softball, association football, rugby union and horse riding. Tice attended Aravon School and St Gerard's School and is currently studying economics at University College Dublin.

== Cricket ==
Elena Neill
Personal information
- Batting: Right-handed
- Bowling: Right-arm leg break
- Role: All-rounder
- Relatives: Patrick Tice (brother)

International information
- National side: Ireland (2011–2015)
- ODI debut (cap 72): 17 August 2011 v Netherlands
- Last ODI: 14 January 2014 v South Africa
- ODI shirt no.: 17
- T20I debut (cap 28): 15 August 2011 v Netherlands
- Last T20I: 22 August 2015 v Australia

Domestic team information
- Years: Team
- 2015: Typhoons

Career statistics
Competition	WODI	WT20I	WLA	WT20
Matches	15	25	43	47
Runs scored	14	155	177	278
Batting average	1.55	11.92	7.69	13.23
100s/50s	0/0	0/0	0/0	0/0
Top score	3	44*	32	44*
Balls bowled	501	490	1,663	861
Wickets	8	16	39	37
Bowling average	47.50	30.62	27.17	23.10
5 wickets in innings	0	0	0	0
10 wickets in match	0	0	0	0
Best bowling	3/31	3/12	3/22	3/10
Catches/stumpings	3/–	6/–	10/–	13/–
- Source: CricketArchive, 28 May 2021

=== Early years ===
Tice began playing garden cricket with her father, George, and brothers, Patrick and Dalton. When the family lived in Vienna, Tice began playing for the Austria Cricket Club. When the family moved to County Wicklow she began playing school cricket at Aravon School. Her school headmaster was a member of Merrion Cricket Club and Tice also began playing club cricket there. She subsequently went onto represent Leinster at under-15, under-17 and under-19 levels.

=== Ireland international ===
Between 2011 and 2015 Tice made 60 appearances for the Ireland women's cricket team. She made her WT20I debut on 15 August 2011 in an away game against the Netherlands aged just 13 years and 272 days. Two days later, on 17 August 2011, she made her WODI debut, again against the Netherlands, during a Women's European Cricket Championship match. As a result, after Pakistan's Sajjida Shah, Tice became the second youngest player in the history of cricket, male or female, to make their international debut playing in an official One Day International or Twenty20 International. She also represented Ireland at the 2014 ICC Women's World Twenty20. Along with Louise McCarthy, she holds the record for the highest tenth-wicket partnership in a Women's Twenty20 International, with an unbeaten 23 runs. She made her last WODI appearance for Ireland against South Africa on 14 January 2014 and her last WT20I for Ireland against Australia on 22 August 2015.

== Field hockey ==
=== St Gerard's School ===
Tice played field hockey for St Gerard's School. In the 2015 Leinster Schoolgirls' Senior Cup final she scored the winner against Alexandra College as St Gerard's won the cup for the first time. She also played in the 2016 final against the same opponents but finished on the losing team. Tice also represented Leinster at under-16 level.

=== Loreto ===
Tice played for Loreto during the 2014–15 Women's Irish Hockey League season. Her teammates at Loreto included Hannah Matthews, Alison Meeke and Nicola Daly. Tice was a Loreto player when she made her debut for the Ireland women's national field hockey team.

=== UCD ===
Together with Deirdre Duke, Gillian Pinder and Katie Mullan, Tice was a member of the UCD team that won a treble during the 2016–17 season, winning the Irish Senior Cup, the Women's Irish Hockey League and the EY Champions Trophy. Tice played a crucial role in securing the league title for UCD when she scored two penalty corners to inflict a first league defeat on Hermes-Monkstown. The result saw UCD overtake Hermes-Monkstown on the final day of the campaign. Tice also helped UCD retain both the Irish Senior Cup and Irish Hockey League titles during the 2017–18 season. Tice also played for UCD in the 2018 EuroHockey Club Champions Cup.

=== Ireland international ===
Tice represented Ireland at Under-16 and Under-18 levels before making her senior debut on 3 November 2015 against Scotland. At the time she was only 17 and was still a student at St Gerard's School. In January 2017 she was a member of the Ireland team that won a 2016–17 Women's FIH Hockey World League Round 2 tournament in Kuala Lumpur, defeating Malaysia 3–0 in the final. Tice also represented Ireland at the 2018 Women's Hockey World Cup and was a prominent member of the team that won the silver medal. She featured in all of Ireland's games throughout the tournament, including the pool games against the United States, India, and England, the quarter-final against India, the semi-final against Spain and the final against the Netherlands.

Tournaments	Place
2016 Hawke's Bay Cup	5th
2016–17 Women's FIH Hockey World League	13th
→ 2017 Kuala Lumpur Tournament	1st
2017 Women's Four Nations Cup	2nd
2017 Women's EuroHockey Nations Championship	6th
2018 Women's Hockey World Cup	2nd place, silver medalist(s)
2018–19 Women's FIH Series Finals	2nd
2019 Women's EuroHockey Nations Championship	5th

== Honours ==
=== Field hockey ===
Ireland

- Women's Hockey World Cup
  - Runners Up: 2018
- Women's FIH Hockey World League
  - Winners: 2017 Kuala Lumpur Tournament
- Women's FIH Hockey Series
  - Runners Up: 2019 Banbridge

UCD

- Women's Irish Hockey League
  - Winners: 2016–17, 2017–18
- Irish Senior Cup
  - Winners: 2016–17, 2017–18
- EY Champions Trophy
  - Winners: 2017

St Gerard's School

- Leinster Schoolgirls' Senior Cup
  - Winners: 2015: 1
  - Runners Up: 2016: 1
