= Nicola Evans =

Irish field hockey player (born 1990)

Personal information
- Born: 17 January 1990 (age 36)

Sport
- Sport: Field hockey
- Position: Forward
Youth career
- Years: Team
- 200x–2009: Alexandra College
Senior career
Years	Team	Caps	Goals
200x–2009	Hermes	-	-
2009–2012	Railway Union	-	-
2012–2015	UCD Ladies	-	-
2015–2017	Hermes-Monkstown	-	-
2017–	Uhlenhorster HC	-	-
National team
Years	Team	Caps	Goals
2010–	Ireland	163	-
Medal record
World Cup
Silver medal – second place	2018 London

Nicola Evans (born 17 January 1990), also referred to as Nikki Evans, is an Ireland women's field hockey international. She was a member of the Ireland team that played in the 2018 Women's Hockey World Cup final. Evans has also won Women's Irish Hockey League titles with Railway Union, UCD and Hermes-Monkstown. In the 2013–14 Evans was a member the UCD team that completed a national double, winning both the league and the Irish Senior Cup.

== Early years, family and education ==
Evans is originally from Clonskeagh, Dublin where she grew up as the eldest of three. Nikki was educated at Sandford Parish NS and Alexandra College. Between 2009 and 2013 she attended University College Dublin. She graduated from UCD with a Bachelor of Business and Law. Between 2014 and 2017 she studied at the Law Society of Ireland and gained a Diploma in Sports Law.

== Domestic teams ==
=== Alexandra College ===
Evans played for Alexandra College in three Leinster Schoolgirls' Senior Cup finals, regularly playing against teams that included future Ireland teammates. In the 2005 final she scored the opening goal in a 4–2 win over a High School, Dublin team that included Nicola Daly. In the 2007 final she scored again in a 5–0 win against a St. Andrew's College team that included Gillian Pinder and Chloe Watkins. In the 2008 final she finished on the losing as Alexandra lost to Loreto Beaufort.

=== Hermes ===
In 2008, while still a schoolgirl at Alexandra College, Evans, together with fellow schoolgirls, Anna O'Flanagan and Chloe Watkins, was a member of the Hermes team that won the All-Ireland Ladies' Club Championships. In 2008–09 Evans was also a member of the Hermes team that finished as runners up in the inaugural Women's Irish Hockey League season. Other members of the team included Anna O'Flanagan, Chloe Watkins and Gillian Pinder.

=== Railway Union ===
In 2009–10, together with Cecelia and Isobel Joyce, Emer Lucey and Kate McKenna, Evans was a member of the Railway Union team that won the Women's Irish Hockey League title. Evans scored as they defeated Cork Harlequins 4–1 in the final. Evans also played for Railway Union in the 2010 Irish Senior Cup final as they lost to Loreto after a penalty shoot-out. Evans was a Railway Union player when she made her senior debut for Ireland.

=== UCD ===
In 2013 together with Chloe Watkins, Anna O'Flanagan, Emily Beatty, and Katie Mullan, Evans was a member of the UCD team that lost 3–2 to Railway Union in the Irish Senior Cup final. In the 2013–14 season UCD completed a national double when they won both the Irish Senior Cup and their first Women's Irish Hockey League title. In the cup final Evans scored as UCD defeated Pembroke Wanderers 2–0. Other members of the double winning squad included Katie Mullan, Emily Beatty, Anna O'Flanagan, Gillian Pinder and Deirdre Duke. Evans also played for UCD in the 2015 EuroHockey Club Champions Cup.

=== Hermes-Monkstown ===
In 2015–16, Evans was a member of the Hermes team that won the Women's Irish Hockey League title and the EY Champions Trophy. Other members of the team included Anna O'Flanagan, Chloe Watkins and Naomi Carroll. In 2016 Hermes merged with Monkstown and they subsequently played as Hermes-Monkstown. Evans played for Hermes-Monkstown in the 2017 EuroHockey Club Champions Cup.

=== Uhlenhorster HC ===
In 2017–18 Evans was a member of the Uhlenhorster HC that finished as runners up in both the Women's Bundesliga and the 2018 EuroHockey Club Champions Cup.

== Ireland international ==
Evans made her senior debut for Ireland in June 2010 against Australia in a Four Nations Tournament in Germany. In March 2015 Evans was a member of the Ireland team that won a 2014–15 Women's FIH Hockey World League Round 2 tournament hosted in Dublin. Evans scored in the final against Canada, which finished 1–1, before Ireland eventually won the tournament following a penalty shoot-out. On 10 June 2015 at the 2014–15 Women's FIH Hockey World League Semifinals, Evans scored a hat-trick against South Africa in the opening pool game. In a second game against the same opponents in the same tournament, Evans sustained a nasty facial injury in the dying minutes of the game. In January 2017 Evans was a member of the Ireland team that won a 2016–17 Women's FIH Hockey World League Round 2 tournament in Kuala Lumpur, defeating Malaysia 3–0 in the final.

Evans represented Ireland at the 2018 Women's Hockey World Cup and was a prominent member of the team that won the silver medal. She featured in all of Ireland's games throughout the tournament, including the pool games against the United States, India, and England, the quarter-final against India, the semi-final against Spain and the final against the Netherlands.

Tournaments	Place
2010 Women's Four Nations Cup	
2012 Women's Field Hockey Olympic Qualifier	2nd
2012 Women's Hockey Investec Cup	6th
2012–13 Women's FIH Hockey World League Round 2	4th
2014 Women's Hockey Champions Challenge I	2nd
2014–15 Women's FIH Hockey World League	15th
→ 2015 Dublin Tournament	1st
2016 Hawke's Bay Cup	5th
2016–17 Women's FIH Hockey World League	13th
→ 2017 Kuala Lumpur Tournament	1st
2017 Women's Four Nations Cup	2nd
2017 Women's EuroHockey Nations Championship	6th
2018 Women's Hockey World Cup	2nd place, silver medalist(s)
2019 Women's EuroHockey Nations Championship	5th

== Occupation ==
Together with Lizzie Colvin, Gillian Pinder, Anna O'Flanagan and Deirdre Duke, Evans was one of five lawyers in the Ireland squad at the 2018 Women's Hockey World Cup. Between 2014 and 2017 she was a trainee solicitor with Mason, Hayes & Curran.\ While based in Hamburg, Evans has worked for CMS Legal Services.

== Honours ==
Ireland

- Women's Hockey World Cup
  - Runners Up: 2018
- Women's FIH Hockey World League
  - Winners: 2015 Dublin, 2017 Kuala Lumpur
- Women's Hockey Champions Challenge I
  - Runners Up: 2014
- Women's Four Nations Cup
  - Runners Up: 2017
- Women's Field Hockey Olympic Qualifier
  - Runners Up: 2012

UCD

- Women's Irish Hockey League
  - Winners: 2013–14
- Irish Senior Cup
  - Winners: 2013–14
  - Runners Up: 2012–13

Railway Union

- Women's Irish Hockey League
  - Winners: 2009–10
- Irish Senior Cup
  - Runners Up: 2009–10

Hermes/Hermes-Monkstown

- Women's Irish Hockey League
  - Winners: 2015–16
  - Runners Up: 2008–09
- EY Champions Trophy
  - Winners: 2015–16
  - Runners Up: 2016–17
- All-Ireland Ladies' Club Championships
  - Winners: 2008

Alexandra College

- Leinster Schoolgirls' Senior Cup
  - Winners: 2004–05, 2006–07
  - Runners Up: 2007–08
