= Chloe Watkins =

Irish field hockey player (born 1992)

Personal information
- Born: 7 March 1992 (age 34)

Sport
- Sport: Field hockey
- Position: Midfielder
Youth career
- Years: Team
- 2004–2010: St. Andrew's College
Senior career
Years	Team	Caps	Goals
200x–2010	Hermes	-	-
2010–2015	UCD Ladies	-	-
2013–2014	→ Club de Campo	-	-
2015–2017	Hermes-Monkstown	-	-
2017–2018	HC Bloemendaal	-	-
2018–	Monkstown	-	-
National team
Years	Team	Caps	Goals
2010–	Ireland	200	-
Medal record
World Cup
Silver medal – second place	2018 London

Chloe Watkins (born 7 March 1992) is an Ireland women's field hockey international. She was a member of the Ireland team that played in the 2018 Women's Hockey World Cup final. Watkins made her 200th senior international appearance for Ireland in the World Cup final. In addition to playing for UCD and Hermes-Monkstown in the Women's Irish Hockey League, Watkins has also played for Club de Campo in Spain and for HC Bloemendaal in the Netherlands. She has won league titles while playing in Ireland and Spain. She has also won senior cup competitions while playing in Ireland, Spain and the Netherlands.

== Early years, family and education ==
Watkins is from Killiney in Dún Laoghaire–Rathdown. She is the daughter of Gordon and Pascal Watkins, nee Comer. Her mother is originally from Castlerea. The Watkins family have strong associations with Monkstown Hockey Club, serving in various capacities as players, coaches and officials. Her father Gordon and brother Gareth were also Ireland men's field hockey internationals. Her sister, Courtney, has played for Hermes-Monkstown in the Women's Irish Hockey League and the EuroHockey Club Champions Cup . Watkins was educated at St. Andrew's College and University College Dublin. In 2015 she graduated from UCD with a Bachelor of Commerce.

== Domestic teams ==
=== St. Andrew's College ===
Watkins played field hockey for St. Andrew's College in a team that also included her older sister, Courtney and Gillian Pinder. She played in four Leinster Schoolgirls' Senior Cup finals, regularly playing against teams that included future Ireland teammates. In the 2006 final St. Andrew's defeated a Loreto, Beaufort team that included Hannah Matthews. 13-year-old Chloe Watkins scored St Andrew's second goal, with an assist from Courtney Watkins, in a 2–0 win. In the 2007 final, the Watkins sisters and Gillian Pinder lost 5–0 to an Alexandra College team that featured Nicola Evans. In the 2009 final St. Andrew's again faced Loreto, Beaufort and Hannah Matthews. This time St. Andrew's won 2–0 after extra time. Courtney Watkins co-captained the team and scored the second goal. In the 2010 final Chloe Watkins captained St. Andrew's as they defeated an Alexandra College team that featured Deirdre Duke and Emily Beatty. Gillian Pinder scored the opening goal in a 2–0 win. In 2010 Chloe Watkins and Gillian Pinder were also members of the St. Andrew's College team that won the Kate Russell All-Ireland Schoolgirls Championship, defeating Coláiste Iognáid, Galway 3–1 in the final. On 10 September 2018, after their success at the Women's Hockey World Cup, Watkins and Pinder returned to St. Andrew's to share their experience with the current students at St. Andrew's.

=== Hermes ===
In 2008, while still a 16-year-old schoolgirl at St. Andrew's College, Watkins, together with fellow schoolgirls, Anna O'Flanagan and Nicola Evans, was a member of the Hermes team that won the All-Ireland Ladies' Club Championships. In 2008–09 Watkins was a member of the Hermes team that finished as runners up in the inaugural Women's Irish Hockey League season. Other members of the team that included Anna O'Flanagan, Nicola Evans and Gillian Pinder. Deirdre Duke was also a teammate when Watkins played for Hermes.

=== UCD ===
Watkins began playing for UCD in 2010–11. She subsequently played for UCD in two successive Irish Senior Cup finals. In 2012, along with Dora Gorman, Anna O'Flanagan and Deirdre Duke, she was a member of the UCD team that defeated Loreto 3–2. UCD where finalists again in 2013 but this time Watkins finished on the losing side as they lost 3–2 to Railway Union. Watkins also helped UCD win the Chilean Cup. She also played for UCD in the 2015 EuroHockey Club Champions Cup, scoring in a 3–2 win against Canterbury Ladies.

=== Club de Campo ===
During the 2013–14 season, while on Erasmus, Watkins played for Club de Campo in the División de Honor Femenina de Hockey Hierba. Watkins scored on her league debut for the club and subsequently helped the club win a league and Copa de la Reina double.

=== Hermes-Monkstown ===
In 2015–16, together with Anna O'Flanagan and Nicola Evans, Watkins was a member of the Hermes team that won the Women's Irish Hockey League title and the EY Champions Trophy. In 2016 Hermes merged with Monkstown and the ladies team subsequently played as Hermes-Monkstown. Watkins subsequently played for Hermes-Monkstown in the 2017 EY Champions Trophy final and in the 2017 EuroHockey Club Champions Cup. On both occasions her teammates included her sister, Courtney.

=== HC Bloemendaal ===
Watkins, together with Anna O'Flanagan, spent the 2017–18 season playing for HC Bloemendaal in the Hoofdklasse in the Netherlands. They were coached by Teun de Nooijer and they helped Bloemendaal win the Gold Cup.

=== Monkstown ===
The 2018–19 season saw Watkins play for Monkstown in the new Division 2 of the Women's Irish Hockey League.

== Ireland international ==
Watkins made her senior debut for Ireland, aged 18, in July 2010 against Scotland, just a couple of months after completing her Leaving Cert. In March 2015 Watkins was a member of the Ireland team that won a 2014–15 Women's FIH Hockey World League Round 2 tournament hosted in Dublin, defeating Canada in the final after a penalty shoot-out. She was also a member of the Ireland team that won the 2015 Women's EuroHockey Championship II, defeating the Czech Republic 5–0 in the final. In January 2017 she was also a member of the Ireland team that won a 2016–17 Women's FIH Hockey World League Round 2 tournament in Kuala Lumpur, defeating Malaysia 3–0 in the final.

Watkins represented Ireland at the 2018 Women's Hockey World Cup and was a prominent member of the team that won the silver medal. She featured in all of Ireland's games throughout the tournament, including the pool games against the United States, India, and England, the quarter-final against India, the semi-final against Spain and the final against the Netherlands. During the tournament Watkins scored twice in penalty shoot-outs. In the quarter-final against India she scored the winning penalty to send Ireland through to the semi-final. She also scored in the shoot out in the semi-final against Spain. In the final against the Netherlands, Watkins made her 200th senior international appearance for Ireland.

Tournaments	Place
2011 Women's Hockey Champions Challenge I	6th
2011 Women's EuroHockey Nations Championship	6th
2012 Women's Field Hockey Olympic Qualifier	2nd
2012 Women's Hockey Investec Cup	6th
2012 Women's Hockey Champions Challenge I	3rd
2012–13 Women's FIH Hockey World League Round 2	4th
2013 Women's EuroHockey Nations Championship	7th
2014 Women's Hockey Champions Challenge I	2nd
2014–15 Women's FIH Hockey World League	15th
→ 2015 Dublin Tournament	1st
2015 Women's EuroHockey Championship II	1st
2016 Hawke's Bay Cup	5th
2016–17 Women's FIH Hockey World League	13th
→ 2017 Kuala Lumpur Tournament	1st
2017 Women's Four Nations Cup	2nd
2017 Women's EuroHockey Nations Championship	6th
2018 Women's Hockey World Cup	2nd place, silver medalist(s)
2018–19 Women's FIH Series Finals	2nd
2019 Women's EuroHockey Nations Championship	5th

== Honours ==
Ireland

- Women's Hockey World Cup
  - Runners Up: 2018
- Women's FIH Hockey World League
  - Winners: 2015 Dublin, 2017 Kuala Lumpur
- Women's EuroHockey Championship II
  - Winners: 2015
- Women's Hockey Champions Challenge I
  - Runners Up: 2014
- Women's FIH Hockey Series
  - Runners Up: 2019 Banbridge
- Women's Four Nations Cup
  - Runners Up: 2017
- Women's Field Hockey Olympic Qualifier
  - Runners Up: 2012

UCD

- Irish Senior Cup
  - Winners: 2011–12
  - Runners Up: 2012–13
- Chilean Cup
  - Winners: 2011, 2013

Hermes/Hermes-Monkstown

- Women's Irish Hockey League
  - Winners: 2015–16
  - Runners Up: 2008–09
- EY Champions Trophy
  - Winners: 2015–16
  - Runners Up: 2016–17
- All-Ireland Ladies' Club Championships
  - Winners: 2008

HC Bloemendaal

- Gold Cup
  - Winners: 2017

Club de Campo

- División de Honor Femenina de Hockey Hierba
  - Winners: 2013–14
- Copa de la Reina de Hockey Hierba
  - Winners: 2013–14

St. Andrew's College

- Leinster Schoolgirls' Senior Cup
  - Winners: 2005–06, 2008–09, 2009–10
  - Runners Up: 2006–07
- Kate Russell All-Ireland Schoolgirls Championships
  - Winners: 2010
