= Emily Beatty =

Ireland women's hockey international

Personal information
- Born: 18 August 1993 (age 33)
- Height: 5 ft 4 in (163 cm)

Sport
- Sport: Field hockey
- Position: Forward
Youth career
- Team
- –: Alexandra College
Senior career
Years	Team	Caps	Goals
20xx–2012	Old Alex	-	-
2012–2016	UCD Ladies	-	-
2016–2017	KHC Dragons	-	-
2017–	Pembroke Wanderers	-	-
National team
Years	Team	Caps	Goals
2013–	Ireland	102	-
Medal record
World Cup
Silver medal – second place	2018 London

Emily Beatty (born 18 August 1993) is an Ireland women's field hockey international. She was a member of the Ireland team that played in the 2018 Women's Hockey World Cup final. Beatty has also won Irish Senior Cup and Women's Irish Hockey League titles with UCD.

== Early years and education ==
Beatty was educated at Alexandra College and University College Dublin. Between 2012 and 2016 she attended University College Dublin and gained a degree in psychology. Her fellow students at Alexandra College included Deirdre Duke. Beatty and Duke played together as teammates in both the Alexandra College field hockey and women's association football teams. Beatty completed her Leaving Cert in 2012. Beatty is currently studying at the Royal College of Surgeons in Ireland.

== Association football ==
Beatty played women's association football for Alexandra College, winning Leinster titles. She also played for Templeogue United, St Josephs AFC, Peamount United and UCD. She was also a member of Leinster Under-15 and Republic of Ireland Under-17 development squads.

== Field hockey ==
=== Early years ===
Beatty began playing field hockey with Alexandra College. In 2011, along with Deirdre Duke, she was a member of the Alexandra College team that won the Leinster Schoolgirls' Senior Cup. In the final they defeated a St. Andrew's College team that included Gillian Pinder. She also played for the Alexandra College alumni teams, Old Alex.

=== UCD ===
Beatty started playing for UCD during the 2012–13 season. In her first season, she helped UCD win the 2012 Chilean Cup and reach the final of the Irish Senior Cup. During the 2013–14 season, Beatty was a member of a UCD squad that included Katie Mullan, Gillian Pinder, Deirdre Duke, Nicola Evans, Anna O'Flanagan and Chloe Watkins. UCD subsequently won the Chilean Cup, the Irish Senior Cup, the Leinster Division One and their first Women's Irish Hockey League title. In the Chilean Cup final, Beatty scored UCD's third goal in a 3–1 win against Ulster Elks. Beatty also played and scored for UCD in the 2015 EuroHockey Club Champions Cup, scoring the winner in a 3–2 win against Canterbury Ladies.

=== KHC Dragons ===
During the 2016–17 season Beatty played for KHC Dragons. She was joined at the Dragons by former UCD teammate, Kate Lloyd.

=== Pembroke Wanderers ===
The 2017–18 season saw Beatty play for Pembroke Wanderers in the Women's Irish Hockey League. Her teammates at Wanderers included Gillian Pinder.

=== Ireland international ===
Together with Roisin Upton and Katie Mullan, Beatty represented Ireland at the 2010 Youth Olympic Games. In Ireland's opening game of the tournament, Beatty scored against the Netherlands in a 3–1 defeat. Beatty subsequently represented Ireland at Under-21 level before making her senior Ireland debut on 22 June 2013 in a 3–2 defeat against Canada. Beatty went onto represent Ireland at the 2014 Women's Hockey Champions Challenge I, scoring twice in a 2–2 win Spain. Beatty was also a member of the Ireland team that won the 2015 Women's EuroHockey Championship II, scoring in the 5–0 win against the Czech Republic in the final. In June 2016 Beatty earned her 50th cap against Spain.

Beatty was originally selected as a non-travelling reserve for the 2018 Women's Hockey World Cup. She subsequently played in warm up games against Japan, Italy and Chile, scoring the only goal in the latter game. At the start of the tournament, Beatty was on holidays in West Cork and had planned to travel to London to watch the final stages. After Megan Frazer was injured in the semi-final against Spain, Beatty was called into the squad. She was already in London when she received a call from Graham Shaw at 11.30 on the day of the final against the Netherlands. She then joined up with the rest of the Ireland squad and featured in the final.

Tournaments	Place
2010 Youth Olympic Games	5th
2014 Women's Hockey Champions Challenge I	2nd
2015 Women's EuroHockey Championship II	1st
2016 Hawke's Bay Cup	5th
2017 Women's Four Nations Cup	2nd
2016–17 Women's FIH Hockey World League Semifinals	7th
2017 Women's EuroHockey Nations Championship	6th
2018 Women's Hockey World Cup	2nd place, silver medalist(s)

== Honours ==
=== Field hockey ===
Ireland

- Women's Hockey World Cup
  - Runners Up: 2018
- Women's EuroHockey Championship II
  - Winners: 2015
- Women's Hockey Champions Challenge I
  - Runners Up: 2014
- Women's Four Nations Cup
  - Runners Up: 2017

UCD

- Women's Irish Hockey League
  - Winners: 2013–14
- Irish Senior Cup
  - Winners: 2013–14
  - Runners Up: 2012–13
- Chilean Cup
  - Winners: 2012, 2013

Alexandra College

- Leinster Schoolgirls' Senior Cup
  - Winners: 2011
