= 2014 Women's World Twenty20 squads =

This is a list of the squads picked for the 2014 ICC Women's World Twenty20 tournament.

== Australia ==
- Meg Lanning (captain)
- Alex Blackwell (vice-captain)
- Nicole Bolton
- Jess Cameron
- Sarah Coyte
- Rene Farrell
- Holly Ferling
- Alyssa Healy (wk)
- Julie Hunter
- Jess Jonassen
- Delissa Kimmince
- Beth Mooney
- Erin Osborne
- Ellyse Perry
- Elyse Villani

== Bangladesh ==
- Salma Khatun (captain)
- Ayasha Rahman
- Fahima Khatun
- Farzana Hoque
- Jahanara Alam
- Khadija Tul Kubra
- Lata Mondal
- Nuzhat Tasnia
- Panna Ghosh
- Rumana Ahmed
- Sanjida Islam
- Shaila Sharmin
- Shamima Sultana (wk)
- Sharmin Akhter
- Shohaly Akther

== England ==
- Charlotte Edwards (captain)
- Tamsin Beaumont
- Kate Cross
- Jodie Dibble
- Georgia Elwiss
- Lydia Greenway
- Rebecca Grundy
- Jenny Gunn
- Danielle Hazell
- Amy Jones (wk)
- Heather Knight
- Nat Sciver
- Anya Shrubsole
- Sarah Taylor (wk)
- Frances Wilson

== India ==
- Mithali Raj (captain)
- Harmanpreet Kaur (vice-captain)
- Soniya Dabir
- Jhulan Goswami
- Karu Jain (wk)
- Latika Kumari
- Smriti Mandhana
- Madhuri Mehta
- Sravanthi Naidu
- Shikha Pandey
- Shubhlakshmi Sharma
- Gouher Sultana
- Vellaswamy Vanitha
- Poonam Yadav

== Ireland ==
- Isobel Joyce (captain)
- Laura Delany
- Emma Flanagan
- Jennifer Gray
- Cecelia Joyce
- Amy Kenealy
- Louise McCarthy
- Kate McKenna
- Lucy O'Reilly
- Eimear Richardson
- Rebecca Rolfe
- Melissa Scott-Hayward
- Clare Shillington
- Elena Tice
- Mary Waldron (wk)

== New Zealand ==
- Suzie Bates (captain)
- Nicola Browne
- Samantha Curtis
- Sophie Devine
- Maddy Green
- Holly Huddleston
- Hayley Jensen
- Felicity Leydon-Davis
- Sara McGlashan (wk)
- Frances Mackay
- Katey Martin (wk)
- Morna Nielsen
- Katie Perkins
- Rachel Priest (wk)

== Pakistan ==
- Sana Mir (captain)
- Bismah Maroof (vice-captain)
- Asmavia Iqbal
- Batool Fatima (wk)
- Javeria Khan
- Marina Iqbal
- Nahida Khan
- Nain Abidi
- Nida Dar
- Qanita Jalil
- Sadia Yousuf
- Sania Khan
- Sidra Ameen
- Sumaiya Siddiqi

== South Africa ==
- Mignon du Preez (captain)
- Trisha Chetty (wk)
- Moseline Daniels
- Shandre Fritz
- Shabnim Ismail
- Marizanne Kapp
- Lizelle Lee
- Marcia Letsoalo
- Sunette Loubser
- Suné Luus
- Nadine Moodley
- Chloe Tryon
- Yolandi van der Westhuizen
- Dane van Niekerk

== Sri Lanka ==
- Shashikala Siriwardene (captain)
- Chamari Atapattu (vice-captain)
- Nilakshi de Silva
- Chandima Gunaratne
- Eshani Lokusuriyage
- Yashoda Mendis
- Hasini Perera
- Chamari Polgampola
- Udeshika Prabodhani
- Oshadi Ranasinghe
- Deepika Rasangika
- Maduri Samuddika
- Rebeca Vandort (wk)
- Sripali Weerakkody

== West Indies ==
- Merissa Aguilleira (captain and wk)
- Shemaine Campbelle
- Shanel Daley
- Deandra Dottin
- Chinelle Henry
- Stacy-Ann King
- Kycia Knight (wk)
- Kyshona Knight
- Natasha McLean
- Anisa Mohammed
- Subrina Munroe
- Shaquana Quintyne
- Shakera Selman
- Tremayne Smartt
- Stafanie Taylor

== See also ==
- 2014 ICC World Twenty20 squads
