= Deirdre Duke =

Ireland women's hockey international

Personal information
- Born: 9 June 1992 (age 34)
- Height: 5 ft 10 in (178 cm)

Sport
- Sport: Field hockey
- Position: Forward
Youth career
- Team
- –: Alexandra College
- –: Three Rock Rovers
Senior career
Years	Team	Caps	Goals
20xx–2011	Hermes	-	-
2011–2018	UCD Ladies	-	-
2012–2013	→ Northeastern Huskies	-	-
2018–	Düsseldorf Hockey Club	-	-
National team
Years	Team	Caps	Goals
2013–	Ireland	103	(15)
Medal record
World Cup
Silver medal – second place	2018 London

Deirdre Duke (born 9 June 1992) is an Ireland women's field hockey international. She was a member of the Ireland team that played in 2018 Women's Hockey World Cup final. Duke has also won Irish Senior Cup and Women's Irish Hockey League titles with UCD. She has also captained the UCD team. Duke also won an All-Ireland Under-14 Ladies' Football Championship with Dublin and represented the Republic of Ireland women's national under-17 football team.

== Early years and education ==
Duke is the daughter of Gretta Duke, née Carroll, who is originally from Ballycanew, County Wexford. She was educated at Alexandra College, Northeastern University and University College Dublin. Duke graduated from the UCD Sutherland School of Law in September 2017 with a BCL with Social Justice degree. In addition to playing women's field hockey, Duke also played both Ladies' Gaelic football and women's association football in her youth. She played Gaelic football for Kilmacud Crokes and was also a member the Dublin team that won the 2005 All-Ireland Under-14 Ladies' Football Championship, defeating Donegal 5–8 to 4–7 in the final. Duke also played association football for Alexandra College, where her teammates included Emily Beatty, and represented the Republic of Ireland women's national football team at schoolgirl level. Her international teammates included Ciara Grant, Naomi Carroll and Dora Gorman.

== Clubs ==
=== Early years ===
Duke played field hockey with Alexandra College. In 2011, along with Emily Beatty, she was a member of the Alexandra College team that won the Leinster Schoolgirls' Senior Cup. In the final they defeated a St. Andrew's College team that included Gillian Pinder. Duke also played for both Three Rock Rovers and Hermes.

=== UCD ===
Duke started playing for UCD in 2011–12. On 13 May 2012, together with Dora Gorman, Chloe Watkins and Anna O'Flanagan, Duke was a member of the UCD team that won the Irish Senior Cup, defeating Loreto 3–2 in the final. Duke was also in the squad when UCD won the Irish Senior Cup in 2014. In 2013–14, together with Katie Mullan, Gillian Pinder, Nicola Evans, Anna O'Flanagan and Emily Beatty, Duke was a member of the UCD team that won their first Women's Irish Hockey League title. On 2 April 2017 Duke scored the winner in the 2017 Irish Senior Cup final as UCD defeated Cork Harlequins in the final. She was also captain of the UCD team. She captained the UCD team again when they defeated Pegasus 4–0 to retain the cup in 2018. Duke also captained UCD to further Irish Hockey League titles in 2016–17 and 2017–18. In 2017 UCD completed a treble when they also won the EY Champions Trophy after defeating Hermes-Monkstown in a penalty shoot-out. Duke also helped UCD win five Chilean Cup titles and played for UCD in the 2015 and 2018 EuroHockey Club Champions Cups.

=== Northeastern Huskies ===
The 2012–13 season saw Duke attend Northeastern University, where she played for Northeastern Huskies. While in Boston, Duke was watching the 2013 marathon when the event was interrupted by a terrorist attack. She was standing close to the spot where the second bomb went off but had left the area just half an hour before the explosions.

=== Düsseldorfer Hockey Club ===
Following her performance with Ireland at the 2018 Women's Hockey World Cup, Duke announced she would be joining Düsseldorfer Hockey Club for the 2018–19 season.

== Ireland international ==
Duke represented Ireland at Under-16, Under-18 and Under-21 levels before making her senior debut against Scotland in June 2013. Duke was a member of the Ireland team that won the 2015 Women's EuroHockey Championship II, defeating the Czech Republic 5–0 in the final.

Duke also represented Ireland at the 2018 Women's Hockey World Cup and was a prominent member of the team that won the silver medal. On 21 July 2018 she scored twice against the United States as Ireland won their opening pool stage game 3–1. She also featured in further pool games against India and England, in the quarter-final against India, in the semi-final against Spain and in the final against the Netherlands.

Tournaments	Place
2015 Women's EuroHockey Championship II	1st
2016 Hawke's Bay Cup	5th
2017 Women's Four Nations Cup	2nd
2016–17 Women's FIH Hockey World League Semifinals	7th
2017 Women's EuroHockey Nations Championship	6th
2018 Women's Hockey World Cup	2nd place, silver medalist(s)
2018–19 Women's FIH Series Finals	2nd
2019 Women's EuroHockey Nations Championship	5th

== Occupation ==
Together with Lizzie Colvin, Nicola Evans, Anna O'Flanagan and Gillian Pinder, Duke was one of five lawyers in the Ireland squad at the 2018 Women's Hockey World Cup. Duke is a trainee solicitor with A&L Goodbody.

== Honours ==
=== Field hockey ===
Ireland

- Women's Hockey World Cup
  - Runners Up: 2018
- Women's EuroHockey Championship II
  - Winners: 2015
- Women's FIH Hockey Series
  - Runners Up: 2019 Banbridge

UCD

- Women's Irish Hockey League
  - Winners: 2013–14, 2016–17, 2017–18
- Irish Senior Cup
  - Winners: 2011–12, 2013–14, 2016–17, 2017–18
- EY Champions Trophy
  - Winners: 2017
- Chilean Cup
  - Winners: 2011, 2013, 2015, 2016, 2017

Alexandra College

- Leinster Schoolgirls' Senior Cup
  - Winners: 2011

=== Gaelic football ===
Dublin

- All-Ireland Under-14 Ladies' Football Championship
  - Winners: 2005
