= Anna O'Flanagan =

Irish field hockey player (born 1990)

Personal information
- Born: 18 February 1990 (age 36)

Sport
- Sport: Field hockey
- Position: Forward
Youth career
- Years: Team
- 19xx–2002: Rathgar Junior School
- 2002–2008: Muckross Park College
Senior career
Years	Team	Caps	Goals
20xx–2011	Hermes	-	-
2011–2015	UCD Ladies	-	-
2015–2017	Hermes-Monkstown	-	-
2017–2018	HC Bloemendaal	-	-
2018–	Pinoké	-	-
National team
Years	Team	Caps	Goals
2010–	Ireland	174	(65)
Medal record
World Cup
Silver medal – second place	2018 London	Team

Anna O'Flanagan (born 18 February 1990) is an Ireland women's field hockey international. She was a member of the Ireland team that played in the 2018 Women's Hockey World Cup final. O'Flanagan has also won Irish Senior Cup and Women's Irish Hockey League titles with UCD.

== Early years and education ==
O'Flanagan is originally from Rathgar and attended Rathgar Junior School. Between 2002 and 2008 she also attended Muckross Park College. Between 2008 and 2013 she attended University College Dublin and graduated with a Bachelor of Law with Economics.

== Club career ==
=== Early years ===
O'Flanagan played women's field hockey for both Rathgar Junior School and Muckross Park College. In 2002 she captained the Rathgar Junior School girls team.

=== Hermes ===
In 2008, when still a schoolgirl at Muckross Park College, O'Flanagan was a member of the Hermes team that won the All-Ireland Ladies' Club Championships. Her teammates at Hermes included Chloe Watkins, Nicola Evans, and Deirdre Duke.

=== UCD ===
O'Flanagan began playing for UCD in 2011. She subsequently played for UCD in three successive Irish Senior Cup finals. In 2012, along with Dora Gorman, Chloe Watkins and Deirdre Duke, she was a member of the UCD team that defeated Loreto 3–2. O'Flanagan scored UCD's third goal in the final. UCD were finalists again in 2013 but this time O'Flanagan finished on the losing side as they lost 3–2 to Railway Union. O'Flanagan scored again in the 2014 final as UCD defeated Pembroke Wanderers 2–0. In 2013–14, together with Katie Mullan, Gillian Pinder, Deirdre Duke, Nicola Evans and Emily Beatty, O'Flanagan was also a member of the UCD team that won the Women's Irish Hockey League. O'Flanagan also played and scored for UCD in the 2015 EuroHockey Club Champions Cup.

=== Hermes-Monkstown ===
In 2015–16, together with Chloe Watkins and Nicola Evans, O'Flanagan was a member of the Hermes team that won the Women's Irish Hockey League title and the EY Champions Trophy. In the EY Champions Trophy final, O'Flanagan scored twice in a 3–1 win over Pegasus. In 2016 Hermes merged with Monkstown and the ladies team subsequently played as Hermes-Monkstown. O'Flanagan subsequently played for Hermes-Monkstown in the 2017 EY Champions Trophy final and in the 2017 EuroHockey Club Champions Cup.

=== Hoofdklasse ===
In 2017 O'Flanagan took a break from her legal career to prepare for the 2018 Women's Hockey World Cup. Together with Chloe Watkins, she played for HC Bloemendaal in the Hoofdklasse in the Netherlands. O'Flanagan was coached by Teun de Nooijer and helped Bloemendaal win the Gold Cup. In 2018 she switched to Pinoké.

== Ireland international ==
O'Flanagan made her debut for Ireland in July 2010 against Scotland. In April 2011 she scored her first goal for Ireland against France. In March 2015 O'Flanagan was a member of the Ireland team that won a 2014–15 Women's FIH Hockey World League Round 2 tournament hosted in Dublin, defeating Canada in the final after a penalty shoot-out. In May 2015 she made her 100th appearance for Ireland and marked the occasion by scoring in a 3–1 win against Canada. In January 2017 she was also a member of the Ireland team that won a 2016–17 Women's FIH Hockey World League Round 2 tournament in Kuala Lumpur, defeating Malaysia 3–0 in the final. O'Flanagan has been a regular goalscorer for Ireland. She scored 12 goals at the Kuala Lumpur tournament, including one in the final, which saw her pass the 50 mark. She was also the leading goalscorer at the tournament.

O'Flanagan represented Ireland at the 2018 Women's Hockey World Cup and was a prominent member of the team that won the silver medal. She featured in all of Ireland's games throughout the tournament, including the pool games against the United States, India, and England, the quarter-final against India, the semi-final against Spain and the final against the Netherlands. During the tournament O'Flanagan scored twice. On 26 July 2018 she scored in the group game against India, securing a 1–0 win for Ireland and a place in the quarter-finals. On 4 August 2018 she also scored in the semi-final against Spain. This was her 65th international goal which saw her become Ireland's joint all-time top scorer, along with Lynsey McVicker. She was subsequently named player of the match.

Tournaments	Place
2012 Women's Hockey Investec Cup	6th
2012 Women's Hockey Champions Challenge I	3rd
2012–13 Women's FIH Hockey World League Round 2	4th
2013 Women's EuroHockey Nations Championship	7th
2014 Women's Hockey Champions Challenge I	2nd
2014–15 Women's FIH Hockey World League	15th
→ 2015 Dublin Tournament	1st
2016 Hawke's Bay Cup	5th
2016–17 Women's FIH Hockey World League	13th
→ 2017 Kuala Lumpur Tournament	1st
2017 Women's Four Nations Cup	2nd
2017 Women's EuroHockey Nations Championship	6th
2018 Women's Hockey World Cup	2nd place, silver medalist(s)
2018–19 Women's FIH Series Finals	2nd
2019 Women's EuroHockey Nations Championship	5th

== Occupation ==
Together with Lizzie Colvin, Nicola Evans, Deirdre Duke and Gillian Pinder, O'Flanagan was one of five lawyers in the Ireland squad at the 2018 Women's Hockey World Cup. O'Flanagan is a former McCann FitzGerald trainee and is a qualified solicitor.

== Honours ==
Ireland

- Women's Hockey World Cup
  - Runners Up: 2018
- Women's FIH Hockey World League
  - Winners: 2015 Dublin, 2017 Kuala Lumpur
- Women's FIH Hockey Series
  - Runners Up: 2019 Banbridge
- Women's Hockey Champions Challenge I
  - Runners Up: 2014
- Women's Four Nations Cup
  - Runners Up: 2017

UCD

- Women's Irish Hockey League
  - Winners: 2013–14
- Irish Senior Cup
  - Winners: 2011–12, 2013–14
  - Runners Up: 2012–13

Hermes/Hermes-Monkstown

- Women's Irish Hockey League
  - Winners: 2015–16
- EY Champions Trophy
  - Winners: 2015–16
  - Runners Up: 2016–17
- All-Ireland Ladies' Club Championships
  - Winners: 2008

HC Bloemendaal

- Gold Cup
  - Winners: 2017
