= UCD Ladies' Hockey Club =

Varsity sports club in Dublin, Ireland

- Union: Hockey Ireland
- Full name: University College Dublin; Ladies' Hockey Club
- Ground: National Hockey Stadium; University College Dublin; Stillorgan Road; Belfield; Dublin 4
- Coach: Miles Warren
- Website: www.ucd.ie
- League: Women's Irish Hockey League

UCD Ladies' Hockey Club is a women's field hockey club in Dublin, Ireland, operating within University College Dublin. In addition to playing in Colours matches with Dublin University and competing in intervarsity tournaments, the club also enter teams in the Women's Irish Hockey League, the Irish Senior Cup and the Irish Junior Cup. During the 2010s UCD has emerged as one Ireland's strongest teams in women's field hockey, winning three Irish Hockey League titles and four Irish Senior Cups. UCD has also represented Ireland in the 2015 and 2018 EuroHockey Club Champions Cups.

== History ==
=== Irish Senior Cup ===
UCD first won the Irish Senior Cup in 1951, captained by Patricia Horne. They then had to wait for fifty eight years before winning their second cup. In 2009 Grace O'Flanagan kept goal for UCD as they defeated Pegasus 4–1. With a team that included Dora Gorman, Chloe Watkins, Deirdre Duke and Anna O'Flanagan, UCD won the cup for a third time in 2012, after defeating Loreto 3–2 in the final. UCD where finalists again in 2013 but this time they lost 3–2 to Railway Union. The UCD squad for the final included Chloe Watkins, Anna O'Flanagan, Emily Beatty, Nicola Evans and Katie Mullan. Nicola Evans and Anna O'Flanagan both scored as UCD defeated Pembroke Wanderers 2–0 in the 2014 final. Katie Mullan, Emily Beatty, Gillian Pinder and Deirdre Duke were also members of the winning UCD team. In the 2017 final, Duke scored the winner as UCD defeated Cork Harlequins 1–0. Duke also captained the team which also featured Gillian Pinder, Elena Tice and Katie Mullan. Duke was again captain when UCD retained the cup in 2018 team after they defeated Pegasus 4–0. Elena Tice and Katie Mullan were also in the team.

Year	Winner			Runner-up	Notes
1951	UCD	2	1	Victorians	after extra time
2009	UCD	4	1	Pegasus	
2011–12	UCD	3	2	Loreto	
2012–13	Railway Union	3	2	UCD	
2013–14	UCD	2	0	Pembroke Wanderers	
2016–17	UCD	1	0	Cork Harlequins	
2017–18	UCD	4	0	Pegasus	

=== Women's Irish Hockey League ===
UCD won their first Women's Irish Hockey League title in 2013–14 with a squad that included Katie Mullan, Gillian Pinder, Deirdre Duke, Nicola Evans, Anna O'Flanagan and Emily Beatty. The 2013–14 season saw UCD complete a treble. In addition to winning the national league title UCD also won the Women's Leinster Division One title and the Irish Senior Cup. The 2016–17 season saw UCD claim the league title in dramatic fashion as Elena Tice scored two penalty corners to inflict a first league defeat on Hermes-Monkstown. The result saw UCD overtake Hermes-Monkstown on the final day of the campaign. The result also saw UCD win their second trophy in six days, adding to the Irish Senior Cup. UCD subsequently completed a treble when they also won the EY Champions Trophy after defeating Hermes-Monkstown in a penalty shoot-out. The 2017–18 season saw UCD retain the league title. Having already won the Irish Senior Cup, UCD also completed a double.

=== Irish Junior Cup ===
UCD's second team enter the Irish Junior Cup. They have been finalists on two occasions, winning the cup in 2014 and finishing as runners-up in 2018.

Year	Winner			Runner-up	Notes
2014	UCD	3	1	Pembroke Wanderers	
2018	Railway Union	2	0	UCD	

=== Chilean Cup ===
The Chilean Cup is a tournament featuring ladies' field hockey teams representing universities from the Republic of Ireland and Northern Ireland. UCD have been regular finalists and winners.

Recent appearances

Year	Winner			Runner-up	Notes
2003	UCD				
2004	UCD				
2005	UCD	5	2	QUB	
2007	UCC	2	1	UCD	
2009	Ulster Elks			UCD	
2010	UCD	2	0	Ulster Elks	
2011	UCD				
2012	UCD	4	0	QUB	
2013	UCD	3	1	Ulster Elks	
2014	Ulster Elks	8	3	UCD	
2015	UCD				
2016	UCD	6	1	QUB	
2017	UCD	6	1	QUB	

=== EuroHockey Club Champions Cup ===
UCD has also represented Ireland in the 2015 and 2018 EuroHockey Club Champions Cups.

==== 2015 EuroHockey Club Champions Cup ====
Quarter-finals

3 April
12:45

Rot-Weiss Köln (Germany)	2 – 1	(Ireland) UCD
Gablać 31'; Stöckel 37'		O'Flanagan 48'

Umpires:
Hannah Sanders (ENG)
Ymkje van Slooten (NED)

Fifth to eighth place classification

5 April
13:00

UCD (Ireland)	3 – 2	(England) Canterbury Ladies
Watkins 11'; Beatty 18'; Duke 29'		Triggs 8'; Wilson 36'

Umpires:
Vilma Bagdanskiene (LTU)
Laurine Delforge (BEL)

Fifth and sixth place

6 April
11:15

Surbiton HC (England)	4 – 1	(Ireland) UCD
Herbert 22'; Twigg 41'; King 55'; Hunter 59'		Mullan 52'

Umpires:
Gabriele Schmitz (GER)
Alwiene Sterk (NED)

==== 2018 EuroHockey Club Champions Cup ====
Quarter-finals

17 May 2018
14:30

Amsterdam (Netherlands)	8–0	(Ireland) UCD
Jonker 1', 49'; Müller 9'; Vega 18', 33', 50'; Verschoor 20', 57'	Report

Umpires:
Gabriele Schmitz (GER)
Ivona Makar (CRO)

Fifth to eighth place classification

18 May 2018
16:45

UCD (Ireland)	1–2	(Germany) Mannheimer HC
Clarke 21'	Report	Förter 23'; Pohl 54'

Umpires:
Anne van den Bosch (BEL)
Hannah Harrison (ENG)

Seventh and eighth place

20 May 2018
09:30

UCD (Ireland)	0–4	(England) Surbiton
	Report	Ansley 35'; Twigg 39'; Martin 56'; Middleton 60'

Umpires:
Gabriele Schmitz (GER)
Anne van den Bosch (BEL)

== Notable players ==
Ireland internationals

When the Ireland women's national field hockey team won the silver medal at the 2018 Women's Hockey World Cup, the squad included nine current or former UCD players. Deirdre Duke, Elena Tice and Katie Mullan were all members of UCD's 2017–18 squad. Gillian Pinder, Chloe Watkins, Grace O'Flanagan, Emily Beatty, Anna O'Flanagan and Nicola Evans were all UCD graduates.

- Niamh Atcheler
- Emily Beatty
- Deirdre Duke
- Nicola Evans
- Brenda Flannery
- Nicola Gray
- Sarah Greene
- Leah Ewart
- Katie Mullan
- Anna O'Flanagan
- Grace O'Flanagan
- Gillian Pinder
- Elena Tice
- Chloe Watkins

Republic of Ireland association football international

- (Republic of Ireland) Dora Gorman

Ireland women's rugby union international

- (Ireland) Jeamie Deacon

== Honours ==
- Women's Irish Hockey League
  - Winners: 2013–14, 2016–17, 2017–18, 2022-23: 4
- Irish Senior Cup
  - Winners: 1951, 2009, 2011–12, 2013–14, 2016–17, 2017–18, 2019-20: 7
  - Runners Up: 2012–13: 1
- Irish Junior Cup
  - Winners: 2014: 1
  - Runners Up: 2018: 1
- EY Champions Trophy
  - Winners: 2017
