= 2014–15 Women's FIH Hockey World League Round 2 =

Field hockey tournament

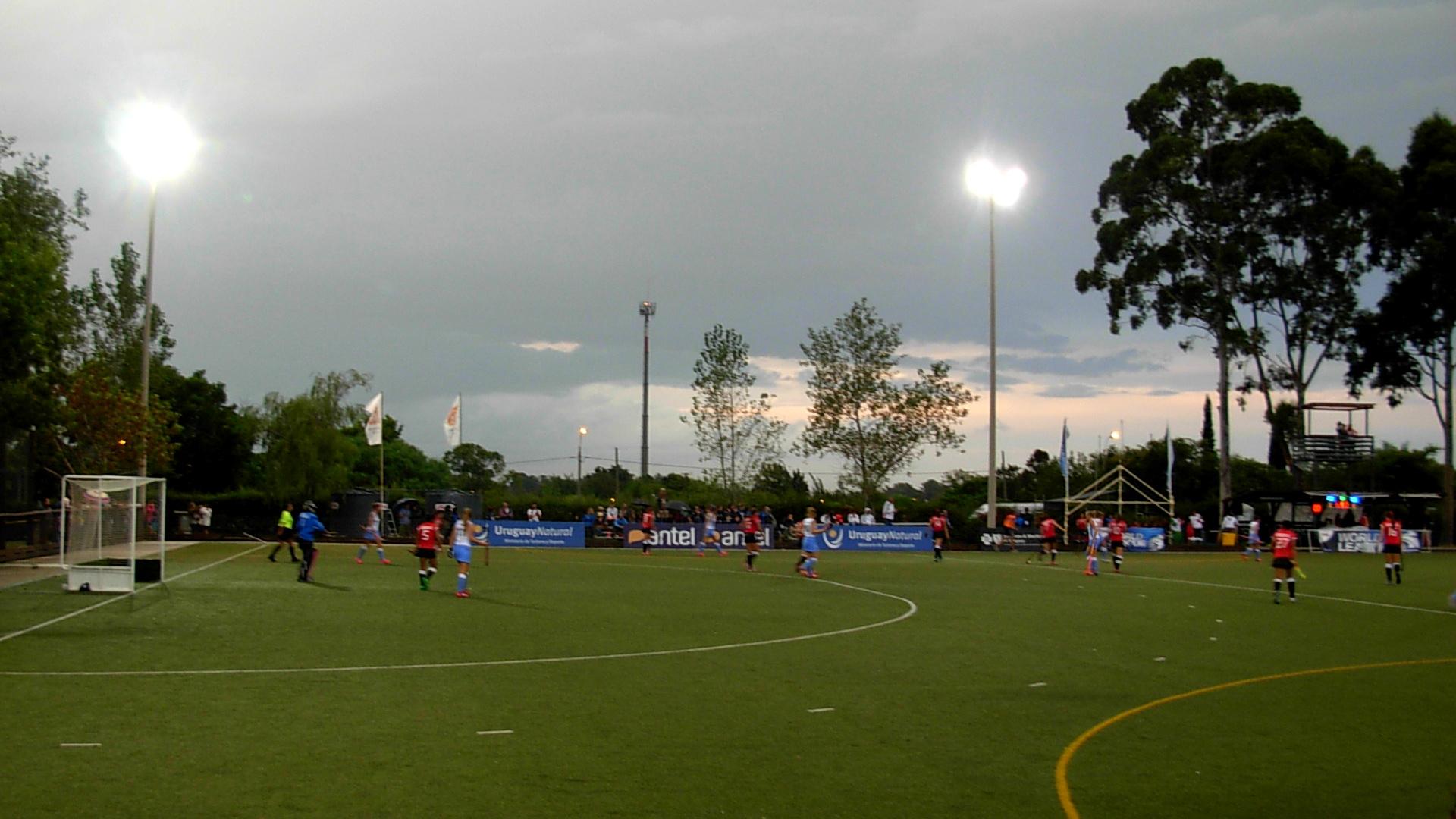
Uruguay-Mexico match

The 2014–15 Women's FIH Hockey World League Round 2 was held from February to March 2015. A total of 24 teams competing in 3 events took part in this round of the tournament playing for 7 berths in the Semifinals, to be played in June and July 2015.

== Qualification ==
8 teams ranked between 12th and 19th in the FIH World Rankings current at the time of seeking entries for the competition qualified automatically, but Belgium and Spain were chosen to host a Semifinal therefore exempt from Round 2. Scotland would have qualified as the nineteenth ranked team but will compete as Great Britain as in every Olympic Qualifying Tournament, giving its berth to twentieth ranked Russia. Additionally 17 teams qualified from Round 1, including Turkey and Ghana who replaced the Czech Republic and Fiji after they withdrew from participating, and one nation that did not meet ranking criteria and was exempt from Round 1 that hosted a Round 2 tournament. The following 24 teams, shown with final pre-tournament rankings, will compete in this round of the tournament.

Dates	Event	Location	Quotas	Qualifier(s)
	Ranked 12th to 20th in the FIH World Rankings		6	India (13); Ireland (14); Azerbaijan (19); Italy (17); Chile (20); Russia (23)
	Host nation		1	Uruguay (31)
21–26 June 2014	2014–15 FIH Hockey World League Round 1	Singapore	4	Malaysia (21); Kazakhstan (32); Thailand (45); Singapore (43)
27–29 June 2014	2014–15 FIH Hockey World League Round 1	Šiauliai, Lithuania	4	Belarus (18); Ukraine (25); Lithuania (34); Poland (26)
5–7 September 2014	2014–15 FIH Hockey World League Round 1	Hradec Králové, Czech Republic	3	France (24); Austria (27); Turkey (36)
5–7 September 2014	2014–15 FIH Hockey World League Round 1	Nairobi, Kenya	2	Kenya (37); Ghana (30)
9–14 September 2014	2014–15 FIH Hockey World League Round 1	Guadalajara, Mexico	2	Canada (22); Mexico (28)
30 September–5 October 2014	2014–15 FIH Hockey World League Round 1	Kingston, Jamaica	2	Trinidad and Tobago (29); Dominican Republic (52)
6–11 December 2014	2014–15 FIH Hockey World League Round 1	Suva, Fiji	0	
Total			24	

== Montevideo ==
- Montevideo, Uruguay, 14–22 February 2015.

All times are Uruguay Summer Time (UTC−02:00)

=== First round ===
==== Pool A ====
Team	Pld	W	SOW	SOL	L	GF	GA	GD	Pts
Uruguay	3	2	1	0	0	12	3	+9	8
Italy	3	2	0	1	0	12	2	+10	7
Mexico	3	1	0	0	2	5	12	−7	3
Dominican Republic	3	0	0	0	3	3	15	−12	0

14 February 2015
17:30

Mexico	5–2	Dominican Republic
Oviedo 27', 47'; Sánchez 44'; Navarro 53', 54'	Report	Birocho 28'; Oflaherti 36'

Umpires:
Catalina Montesino (CHI)
Natalia Lodeiro (URU)

14 February 2015
20:00

Italy	2–2	Uruguay
Ronsisvalli 43'; Tiddi 60'	Report	Mora 13'; Stanley 44'
Penalties
Mirabella (penalty shoot-out missed); Casale (penalty shoot-out missed); Di Mauro (penalty shoot-out missed); Ruggieri (penalty shoot-out scored); Tiddi (penalty shoot-out missed)	1–2	(penalty shoot-out missed) Mora; (penalty shoot-out missed) Olave; (penalty shoot-out missed) Villar; (penalty shoot-out scored) Lamberti; (penalty shoot-out scored) Vilar del Valle

Umpires:
Veronica Villafañe (ARG)
Maricel Sánchez (ARG)

16 February 2015
15:00

Mexico	0–5	Italy
	Report	Braconi 7'; Ruggieri 10', 26', 37'; Garraffo 15'

Umpires:
Ines El Hajem (FRA)
Veronica Villafañe (ARG)

16 February 2015
20:00

Uruguay	5–1	Dominican Republic
Mora 6'; Olave 8'; Norbis 30'; Laborde 33'; Taborda 54'	Report	Moronta 42'

Umpires:
Maggie Giddens (USA)
Saadat Zakiyeva (AZE)

17 February 2015
17:30

Italy	5–0	Dominican Republic
Wybieralska 4', 32'; Lecchini 24'; Ruggieri 38', 44'	Report

Umpires:
Ines El Hajem (FRA)
Diana Fuentes (MEX)

17 February 2015
20:00

Uruguay	5–0	Mexico
Mora 13'; Barrandeguy 32'; Vilar Del Valle 37'; Kliche 44'; Norbis 49'	Report

Umpires:
Catalina Montesino (CHI)
Saadat Zakiyeva (AZE)

==== Pool B ====
Team	Pld	W	D	L	GF	GA	GD	Pts
Azerbaijan	3	3	0	0	13	3	+10	9
France	3	2	0	1	10	3	+7	6
Trinidad and Tobago	3	1	0	2	6	8	−2	3
Kenya	3	0	0	3	0	15	−15	0

14 February 2015
15:00

Azerbaijan	5–1	Trinidad and Tobago
Mammadova 4', 46'; Aliyeva 35', 48', 50'	Report	Lewis 44'

Umpires:
Maggie Giddens (USA)
Diana Fuentes (MEX)

15 February 2015
17:30

France	2–3	Azerbaijan
Parent 15'; Perrocheau 20'	Report	Ahmadova 3'; Druzhinina 17', 46'

Umpires:
Caren Ouma (KEN)
Ilaria Amorosini (ITA)

15 February 2015
20:00

Trinidad and Tobago	5–0	Kenya
	Report

Umpires:
Ines El Hajem (FRA)
Saadat Zakiyeva (AZE)

16 February 2015
17:30

France	5–0	Kenya
	Report

17 February 2015
12:30

Azerbaijan	5–0	Kenya
	Report

Umpires:
Natalia Lodeiro (URU)
Ilaria Amorosini (ITA)

17 February 2015
15:00

Trinidad and Tobago	0–3	France
	Report	Delannoy 7'; Perrocheau 16', 19'

Umpires:
Maricel Sánchez (ARG)
Caren Ouma (KEN)

=== Second round ===
Fifth place
France	6
Trinidad and Tobago	1
Seventh place
Kenya	1
Dominican Republic	2

Consolation semifinals
Kenya	0
France	4
Trinidad and Tobago	3
Dominican Republic	2

Quarterfinals
Uruguay	3
Kenya	0
France	1 (0)
Mexico (p.s.o.)	1 (2)
Italy	3
Trinidad and Tobago	0
Azerbaijan	5
Dominican Republic	0

Semifinals
Uruguay	2
Mexico	0
Italy	4
Azerbaijan	0

Final
Uruguay	0
Italy	4
Third place
Mexico	2
Azerbaijan	5

==== Quarterfinals ====
19 February 2015
12:30

Azerbaijan	5–0	Dominican Republic
Druzhinina 21', 38'; Aliyeva 23', 30'; Mammadova 51'	Report

Umpires:
Catalina Montesino (CHI)
Ines El Hajem (FRA)

19 February 2015
15:00

France	1–1	Mexico
Perrocheau 15'	Report	Correa 24'
Penalties
de Galzain (penalty shoot-out missed); Berly (penalty shoot-out missed); Huvelle (penalty shoot-out missed); Rogeau (penalty shoot-out missed)	0–2	(penalty shoot-out missed) Navarro; (penalty shoot-out missed) Carmona; (penalty shoot-out scored) Correa; (penalty shoot-out scored) Oviedo

Umpires:
Saadat Zakiyeva (AZE)
Natalia Lodeiro (URU)

19 February 2015
17:30

Italy	3–0	Trinidad and Tobago
Ronsisvalli 9', 19'; Lecchini 11'	Report

Umpires:
Veronica Villafañe (ARG)
Diana Fuentes (MEX)

19 February 2015
20:00

Uruguay	3–0	Kenya
Norbis 1', 4'; Kliche 27'	Report

Umpires:
Maggie Giddens (USA)
Maricel Sánchez (ARG)

==== Fifth to eighth place classification ====
===== Crossover =====
20 February 2015
17:30

Kenya	0–4	France
	Report	Lardeur 5'; Rogeau 11', 47'; Huvelle 41'

Umpires:
Saadat Zakiyeva (AZE)
Ilaria Amorosini (ITA)

20 February 2015
20:00

Trinidad and Tobago	3–2	Dominican Republic
Hingh 10'; Wynne 37', 47'	Report	Birocho 36'; Marte 60'

Umpires:
Caren Ouma (KEN)
Ines El Hajem (FRA)

===== Seventh and eighth place =====
22 February 2015
12:30

Kenya	1–2	Dominican Republic
Guchu 38'	Report	Navamuel 25'; Moronta 39'

Umpires:
Natalia Lodeiro (URU)
Diana Fuentes (MEX)

===== Fifth and sixth place =====
22 February 2015
15:00

France	6–1	Trinidad and Tobago
Berly 7'; Hevin 15'; Rogeau 20'; Delannoy 43'; Perrocheau 45'; Ponthieu 47'	Report	Trotman 44'

Umpires:
Ilaria Amorosini (ITA)
Caren Ouma (KEN)

==== First to fourth place classification ====
===== Semifinals =====
21 February 2015
17:30

Italy	4–0	Azerbaijan
Casale 20'; Garraffo 27', 42'; Ruggieri 52'	Report

Umpires:
Maricel Sánchez (ARG)
Catalina Montesino (CHI)

21 February 2015
20:00

Uruguay	2–0	Mexico
Lamberti 26'; Barrandeguy 29'	Report

Umpires:
Maggie Giddens (USA)
Veronica Villafañe (ARG)

===== Third and fourth place =====
22 February 2015
17:30

Mexico	2–5	Azerbaijan
Correa 4'; Cota 52'	Report	Druzhinina 7'; Aliyeva 22'; Tsyganska 23', 29', 35'

Umpires:
Ines El Hajem (FRA)
Catalina Montesino (CHI)

===== Final =====
22 February 2015
20:00

Uruguay	0–4	Italy
	Report	Ruggieri 17'; Casale 23'; Wybieralska 37'; Tiddi 47'

Umpires:
Maggie Giddens (USA)
Maricel Sánchez (ARG)

=== Awards ===
- Player of the Tournament: Chiara Tiddi (ITA)
- Top Scorer: Giuliana Ruggieri (ITA) (7 goals)
- Young Player of the Tournament: Constanza Barrandeguy (URU)
- Goalkeeper of the Tournament: Jesús Castillo (MEX)

== New Delhi ==
- New Delhi, India, 7–15 March 2015.

All times are Indian Standard Time (UTC+05:30)

=== First round ===
==== Pool A ====
Team	Pld	W	D	L	GF	GA	GD	Pts
India	3	3	0	0	21	0	+21	9
Poland	3	2	0	1	8	3	+5	6
Thailand	3	1	0	2	4	11	−7	3
Ghana	3	0	0	3	1	20	−19	0

7 March 2015
17:45

Poland	4–1	Thailand
Rybacha 7', 58'; Zagajska 38'; Wieloch 46'	Report	Sanpoung 45'

Umpires:
Natalia Kovaleva (RUS)
Amina Dyussembekova (KAZ)

7 March 2015
20:00

India	13–0	Ghana
Kataria 8', 21', 48', 56'; Monika 9'; Ekka 18'; Rampal 23', 33'; A. Kaur 40'; J. Kaur 53', 57'; P. Rani 54'; Minz 56'	Report

Umpires:
Liu Xiaoying (CHN)
Nor Piza Hassan (MAS)

8 March 2015
17:45

Ghana	1–3	Thailand
Sam 33'	Report	Yungyuen 14', 60'; Sanpoung 32'

Umpires:
Natalia Kovaleva (RUS)
Nor Piza Hassan (MAS)

8 March 2015
20:00

Poland	0–2	India
	Report	Kataria 13'; P. Rani 26'

Umpires:
Kim Jung-hee (KOR)
Tan Koon Kim (SIN)

10 March 2015
17:45

Ghana	0–4	Poland
	Report	Zagajska 6'; Katerla 23'; Walasek 48'; Slawinska 60'

Umpires:
Tan Koon Kim (SIN)
Nor Piza Hassan (MAS)

10 March 2015
20:00

India	6–0	Thailand
A. Kaur 25'; J. Kaur 38', 60'; Rampal 40'; Kataria 45'	Report

Umpires:
Kim Jung-hee (KOR)
Amina Dyussembekova (KAZ)

==== Pool B ====
Team	Pld	W	D	L	GF	GA	GD	Pts
Malaysia	3	3	0	0	16	0	+16	9
Kazakhstan	3	2	0	1	7	10	−3	6
Russia	3	1	0	2	9	6	+3	3
Singapore	3	0	0	3	0	16	−16	0

7 March 2015
13:15

Malaysia	8–0	Kazakhstan
Ruhani 7'; Mansur 10'; Othman 28'; Sukri 29'; Silin 33'; Hashim 37'; Noh 53'; Onn 59'	Report

Umpires:
Kim Jung-hee (KOR)
Urszula Wybieralska (POL)

7 March 2015
15:30

Russia	7–0	Singapore
Osipova 9'; Shamina 11'; Drepenkina 20'; Fedorova 38', 50'; Reviakina 47'; Petrova 52'	Report

Umpires:
Thanittha Chaungmanichot (THA)
Nirmala Dagar (IND)

8 March 2015
13:15

Kazakhstan	4–0	Singapore
Domashneva 2', 28'; Sazontova 38'; Khonina 43'	Report

Umpires:
Thanittha Chaungmanichot (THA)
Nirmala Dagar (IND)

8 March 2015
15:30

Russia	0–3	Malaysia
	Report	Onn 37'; Din 40'; Silin 59'

Umpires:
Hagar Laryea (GHA)
Liu Xiaoying (CHN)

10 March 2015
13:15

Malaysia	5–0	Singapore
Silin 24', 32', 45'; Mohamed 26'; Mansur 41'	Report

Umpires:
Thanittha Chaungmanichot (THA)
Hagar Laryea (GHA)

10 March 2015
15:30

Kazakhstan	3–2	Russia
Gataulina 21', 28', 38'	Report	Drepenkina 35'; Shumilina 44'

Umpires:
Urszula Wybieralska (POL)
Liu Xiaoying (CHN)

=== Second round ===
Fifth place
Kazakhstan	0
Russia	9
Seventh place
Singapore	1
Ghana	2

Consolation semifinals
Singapore	1
Kazakhstan	2
Russia	7
Ghana	1

Quarterfinals
India	10
Singapore	0
Kazakhstan	3
Thailand	4
Poland	4
Russia	2
Malaysia	2
Ghana	0

Semifinals
India	5
Thailand	0
Poland	1
Malaysia	0

Final
India	3
Poland	1
Third place
Thailand	0
Malaysia	3

==== Quarterfinals ====
12 March 2015
13:15

Malaysia	2–0	Ghana
Sumantri 3'; Onn 25'	Report

Umpires:
Amina Dyussembekova (KAZ)
Natalia Kovaleva (RUS)

12 March 2015
15:30

Kazakhstan	3–4	Thailand
Sazontova 22'; Domashneva 26'; Dobrioglo 50'	Report	Duangurai 10'; Nakpolkrung 21'; Sakunpithak 41'; Wongkeaw 47'

Umpires:
Tan Koon Kim (SIN)
Hagar Laryea (GHA)

12 March 2015
17:45

Poland	4–2	Russia
Walasek 6'; Wiśniewska 27'; Rybacha 40'; Zagajska 49'	Report	Fedorova 55'; Shumilina 59'

Umpires:
Nirmala Dagar (IND)
Kim Jung-hee (KOR)

12 March 2015
20:00

India	10–0	Singapore
P. Rani 4'; N. Kaur 6'; Kataria 17', 48', 56', 57'; Barla 19'; Deepika 32'; Rampal 35'; J. Kaur 51'	Report

Umpires:
Liu Xiaoying (CHN)
Urszula Wybieralska (POL)

==== Fifth to eighth place classification ====
===== Crossover =====
14 March 2015
13:15

Singapore	1–2	Kazakhstan
Xinni 22'	Report	Khonina 15'; Imangaliyeva 42'

Umpires:
Thanittha Chaungmanichot (THA)
Natalia Kovaleva (RUS)

14 March 2015
15:30

Russia	7–1	Ghana
Shamina 12', 15', 58'; Shumilina 26'; Svezhentseva 32', 33', 54'	Report	Bamfo 10'

Umpires:
Tan Koon Kim (SIN)
Amina Dyussembekova (KAZ)

===== Seventh and eighth place =====
15 March 2015
13:15

Singapore	1–2	Ghana
Ivy 6'	Report	Sasu 9'; Opoku 57'

Umpires:
Amina Dyussembekova (KAZ)
Nirmala Dagar (IND)

===== Fifth and sixth place =====
15 March 2015
15:30

Kazakhstan	0–9	Russia
	Report	Shamina 13', 41', 43', 56'; Vasileva 17', 55'; Fedorova 21'; Shumilina 24', 55'

Umpires:
Nor Piza Hassan (MAS)
Hagar Laryea (GHA)

==== First to fourth place classification ====
===== Semifinals =====
14 March 2015
17:45

Poland	1–0	Malaysia
Rybacha 3'	Report

Umpires:
Nirmala Dagar (IND)
Kim Jung-hee (KOR)

14 March 2015
20:00

India	5–0	Thailand
J. Kaur 11'; Lakra 16'; P. Rani 22'; Rampal 40'; A. Kaur 53'	Report

Umpires:
Urszula Wybieralska (POL)
Nor Piza Hassan (MAS)

===== Third and fourth place =====
15 March 2015
17:45

Thailand	0–3	Malaysia
	Report	Sumantri 11'; Silin 29', 49'

Umpires:
Urszula Wybieralska (POL)
Natalia Kovaleva (RUS)

===== Final =====
15 March 2015
20:00

India	3–1	Poland
Kataria 15'; Rampal 44'; Rani 59'	Report	Walasek 17'

Umpires:
Liu Xiaoying (CHN)
Kim Jung-hee (KOR)

=== Awards ===
- Player of the Tournament: Marlena Rybacha (POL)
- Top Scorer: Vandana Kataria (IND) (11 goals)
- Young Player of the Tournament: Rani Rampal (IND)
- Goalkeeper of the Tournament: Marta Kucharska (POL)

== Dublin ==
- Dublin, Ireland, 14–22 March 2015.

All times are Greenwich Mean Time (UTC±00:00)

=== First round ===
==== Pool A ====
Team	Pld	W	D	L	GF	GA	GD	Pts
Ireland	3	3	0	0	20	1	+19	9
Canada	3	2	0	1	9	3	+6	6
Ukraine	3	1	0	2	4	8	−4	3
Turkey	3	0	0	3	0	21	−21	0

14 March 2015
14:45

Ireland	5–0	Ukraine
O'Flanagan 4', 15'; Sargent 17'; Frazer 31'; Connery 36'	Report

Umpires:
Claire Druijts (NED)
Camila Cabargas (CHI)

14 March 2015
17:00

Canada	5–0	Turkey
Haughn 7'; Culley 12'; McManus 19'; Stairs 35', 58'	Report

Umpires:
Violeta Eismayer (AUT)
Olena Klymenko (UKR)

15 March 2015
15:15

Canada	1–2	Ireland
Culley 59'	Report	Connery 23'; Dillon 56'

Umpires:
Violeta Eismayer (AUT)
Liudmila Aleinikoviene (BLR)

15 March 2015
17:30

Ukraine	3–0	Turkey
Shevchenko 33'; Derkach 28', 35'	Report

Umpires:
Camila Cabargas (CHI)
Gillian Garrett (IRL)

17 March 2015
14:45

Ireland	13–0	Turkey
Mullan 4'; Carroll 9', 19', 32', 48'; Smyth 14', 25', 55'; Evans 20'; Frazer 28', 51'; O'Flanagan 30'; Connery 40'	Report

Umpires:
Denise Pelletier (CAN)
Olena Klymenko (UKR)

17 March 2015
17:00

Ukraine	1–3	Canada
Liashenko 36'	Report	Haughn 14', 56'; Stairs 33'

Umpires:
Vilma Bagdanskienė (LTU)
Gillian Garrett (IRL)

==== Pool B ====
Team	Pld	W	SOW	SOL	L	GF	GA	GD	Pts
Chile	3	3	0	0	0	12	1	+11	9
Belarus	3	1	1	0	1	5	4	+1	5
Austria	3	1	0	0	2	4	8	−4	3
Lithuania	3	0	0	1	2	3	11	−8	1

14 March 2015
10:15

Belarus	2–0	Austria
Bahushevich 15', 36'	Report

Umpires:
Ana Faias (POR)
Esin Öztürk (TUR)

14 March 2015
12:30

Chile	4–0	Lithuania
D. Caram 22', 41'; Walbaum 23'; Venegas 56'	Report

Umpires:
Gillian Garrett (IRL)
Denise Pelletier (CAN)

15 March 2015
10:45

Austria	4–0	Lithuania
Krüger 18'; Zerbs 37'; Buchta 51'; Laginja 60'	Report

Umpires:
Claire Druijts (NED)
Olena Klymenko (UKR)

15 March 2015
13:00

Chile	2–1	Belarus
Filipek 24'; Krimerman 39'	Report	Pakhanava 9'

Umpires:
Ana Faias (POR)
Vilma Bagdanskienė (LTU)

17 March 2015
10:15

Belarus	3–3	Lithuania
Pakhanava 10'; Bahushevich 22'; Papkova 41'	Report	Jakovlevaitė 37'; Grubliauskaitė 39'; Nomeikaitė 55'
Penalties
Papkova (penalty shoot-out scored); Batura (penalty shoot-out scored); Bahushevich (penalty shoot-out scored); Silitskaya (penalty shoot-out scored)	4–1	(penalty shoot-out missed) Juodytė; (penalty shoot-out missed) Petrauskaitė; (penalty shoot-out scored) Jakovlevaitė

Umpires:
Camila Cabargas (CHI)
Violeta Eismayer (AUT)

17 March 2015
12:30

Austria	0–6	Chile
	Report	Urroz 24'; Krimerman 43'; Pizarro 44'; D. Caram 49', 52'; Filipek 53'

Umpires:
Esin Öztürk (TUR)
Liudmila Aleinikoviene (BLR)

=== Second round ===
Fifth place
Lithuania	1
Austria	2
Seventh place
Ukraine	2
Turkey	1

Consolation semifinals
Lithuania	2
Ukraine	0
Austria	6
Turkey	0

Quarterfinals
Ireland	2
Lithuania	0
Belarus	5
Ukraine	1
Canada	5
Austria	1
Chile	14
Turkey	2

Semifinals
Ireland	7
Belarus	0
Canada (p.s.o.)	0 (5)
Chile	0 (4)

Final
Ireland (p.s.o.)	1 (4)
Canada	1 (3)
Third place
Belarus	2
Chile	3

==== Quarterfinals ====
19 March 2015
10:30

Canada	5–1	Austria
Culley 3', 24'; Thicke 30'; McManus 32'; Norlander 60'	Report	Thörnblom 7'

Umpires:
Esin Öztürk (TUR)
Vilma Bagdanskienė (LTU)

19 March 2015
13:00

Belarus	5–1	Ukraine
Bahushevich 35', 46', 53', 55'; Halibouskaya 52'	Report	Samokhodchenko 52'

Umpires:
Denise Pelletier (CAN)
Claire Druijts (NED)

19 March 2015
15:30

Ireland	2–0	Lithuania
Evans 20'; Frazer 28'	Report

Umpires:
Ana Faias (POR)
Olena Klymenko (UKR)

19 March 2015
18:00

Chile	14–2	Turkey
Urroz 15', 41', 55', 57'; D. Caram 23', 30', 37', 56'; Venegas 24', 36'; Tala 25'; C. Caram 34'; Krimerman 47'; Filipek 48'	Report	Güzelal 54'; Esen 59'

Umpires:
Liudmila Aleinikoviene (BLR)
Gillian Garrett (IRL)

==== Fifth to eighth place classification ====
===== Crossover =====
21 March 2015
09:30

Lithuania	2–0	Ukraine
Poškutė 6', 33'	Report

Umpires:
Camila Cabargas (CHI)
Denise Pelletier (CAN)

21 March 2015
12:00

Austria	6–0	Turkey
Zerbs 14', 52'; Thörnblom 17'; Sandner 23'; Krüger 25'; Rubas 55'	Report

Umpires:
Liudmila Aleinikoviene (BLR)
Olena Klymenko (UKR)

===== Seventh and eighth place =====
22 March 2015
09:30

Ukraine	2–1	Turkey
Liashenko 54'; Kurovska 54'	Report	Küçükkoç 11'

Umpires:
Gillian Garrett (IRL)
Violeta Eismayer (AUT)

===== Fifth and sixth place =====
22 March 2015
12:00

Lithuania	1–2	Austria
Adomavičiūtė 21'	Report	Zerbs 12'; Krüger 45'

Umpires:
Esin Öztürk (TUR)
Olena Klymenko (UKR)

==== First to fourth place classification ====
===== Semifinals =====
21 March 2015
14:30

Ireland	7–0	Belarus
Evans 2', 48'; O'Flanagan 6'; Frazer 13'; Carroll 24'; Smyth 28'; Mullan 39'	Report

Umpires:
Claire Druijts (NED)
Vilma Bagdanskienė (LTU)

21 March 2015
17:00

Canada	0–0	Chile
	Report
Penalties
Norlander (penalty shoot-out scored); Sourisseau (penalty shoot-out missed); Stairs (penalty shoot-out scored); Secco (penalty shoot-out scored); Raye (penalty shoot-out scored); Stairs (penalty shoot-out scored)	5–4	(penalty shoot-out scored) García; (penalty shoot-out missed) C. Caram; (penalty shoot-out scored) Urroz; (penalty shoot-out scored) Villalabeitia; (penalty shoot-out scored) D. Caram; (penalty shoot-out missed) García

Umpires:
Ana Faias (POR)
Violeta Eismayer (AUT)

===== Third and fourth place =====
22 March 2015
14:30

Belarus	2–3	Chile
Syrayezhka 33'; Bahushevich 40'	Report	Urroz 3'; Villalabeitia 30'; D. Caram 31'

Umpires:
Denise Pelletier (CAN)
Vilma Bagdanskienė (LTU)

===== Final =====
22 March 2015
17:00

Ireland	1–1	Canada
Evans 31'	Report	Stewart 37'
Penalties
Frazer (penalty shoot-out scored); O'Flanagan (penalty shoot-out scored); Smyth (penalty shoot-out scored); Mullan (penalty shoot-out missed); Connery (penalty shoot-out scored)	4–3	(penalty shoot-out missed) Norlander; (penalty shoot-out scored) Sourisseau; (penalty shoot-out scored) Stairs; (penalty shoot-out scored) Secco; (penalty shoot-out missed) Raye

Umpires:
Ana Faias (POR)
Claire Druijts (NED)

=== Awards ===
- Player of the Tournament: (Ireland) Megan Frazer
- Top Scorer: Daniela Caram (CHI) (9 goals)
- Young Player of the Tournament: Hannah Haughn (CAN)
- Goalkeeper of the Tournament: Kaitlyn Williams (CAN)
