= Aline Fobe =

Belgian field hockey player

Personal information
- Born: 21 January 1993 (age 33) Wilrijk, Belgium
- Height: 1.75 m (5 ft 9 in)
- Weight: 64 kg (141 lb)

Sport
- Sport: Field hockey
- Position: Defender
- Club: Braxgata HC
National team
Years	Team	Caps	Goals
–	Belgium	160	-

Aline Fobe (born 21 January 1993) is a Belgian field hockey player for the Belgian national team.

She participated at the 2018 Women's Hockey World Cup.
