= 2016 Hawke's Bay Cup =

Field hockey competition

Tournament details
- Host country: New Zealand
- City: Hastings
- Dates: 2–10 April
- Teams: 8
- Venue: Hawke's Bay Sports Park

Final positions
- Champions: New Zealand (1st title)
- Runner-up: Japan
- Third place: Australia

Tournament statistics
- Matches played: 24
- Goals scored: 85 (3.54 per match)
- Top scorer: (Japan) Mie Nakashima (5 goals)

The 2016 Hawke's Bay Cup was the 3rd edition of the invitational Hawke's Bay Cup competition. It took place between 2–10 April 2016 in Hastings, New Zealand. A total of eight teams competed for the title.

New Zealand won the tournament for the first time after defeating Japan 3–2 in the final. Australia won the third place match by defeating China 3–1.

== Teams ==
Including New Zealand, 8 teams were invited by the New Zealand Hockey Federation to participate in the tournament.

- Australia
- Canada
- China
- India
- Ireland
- Japan
- New Zealand
- South Korea

== Results ==
=== First round ===
==== Pool A ====
Pos	Team	Pld	W	D	L	GF	GA	GD	Pts
1	Japan	3	2	1	0	10	4	+6	7
2	Australia	3	2	1	0	7	1	+6	7
3	Canada	3	1	0	2	4	11	−7	3
4	South Korea	3	0	0	3	2	7	−5	0

Source: FIH
Rules for classification: 1) points; 2) goal difference; 3) goals scored; 4) head-to-head result.

2 April 2016
11:00

South Korea	1–2	Canada
Park Ki-ju 22'	Report	Stairs 43'; Stewart 57'

Hawke's Bay Sports Park
Umpires:
Alison Keogh
Fanneke Alkemade

2 April 2016
13:00

Australia	1–1	Japan
Parker 53'	Report	Nakashima 13'

Hawke's Bay Sports Park
Umpires:
Miao Lin
Kim Yoon-Seon

3 April 2016
11:00

Japan	6–2	Canada
Shibata 17'; Nakashima 20', 43'; Mitsuhashi 24'; Kawamura 37'; Shimizu 53'	Report	Hennig 46'; Woodcroft 58'

Hawke's Bay Sports Park
Umpires:
Alison Keogh
Devi Durga

3 April 2016
13:00

Australia	2–0	South Korea
Parker 33'; Stewart 38'	Report

Hawke's Bay Sports Park
Umpires:
Miao Lin
Amber Church

5 April 2016
12:00

South Korea	1–3	Japan
Kim Bo-mi 8'	Report	H. Nagai 24'; Y. Nagai 25'; Nakashima 47'

Hawke's Bay Sports Park
Umpires:
Alison Keogh
Melissa Trivic

5 April 2016
14:00

Australia	4–0	Canada
Morgan 9'; Kenny 14'; Stewart 18', 56'	Report

Hawke's Bay Sports Park
Umpires:
Miao Lin
Devi Durga

==== Pool B ====
Pos	Team	Pld	W	D	L	GF	GA	GD	Pts
1	New Zealand	3	3	0	0	7	2	+5	9
2	China	3	2	0	1	7	4	+3	6
3	Ireland	3	1	0	2	5	7	−2	3
4	India	3	0	0	3	1	7	−6	0

Source: FIH
Rules for classification: 1) points; 2) goal difference; 3) goals scored; 4) head-to-head result.

2 April 2016
15:00

New Zealand	1–0	India
Merry 16'	Report

Hawke's Bay Sports Park
Umpires:
Laurine Delforge
Junko Wagatsuma

2 April 2016
17:00

China	4–0	Ireland
Wang 10'; Song 12'; Liang 18'; Li 28'	Report

Hawke's Bay Sports Park
Umpires:
Lelia Sacre
Melissa Trivic

3 April 2016
15:00

New Zealand	3–1	China
Flynn 16', 47'; Cocks 42'	Report	Zhang 12'

Hawke's Bay Sports Park
Umpires:
Fanneke Alkemade
Melissa Trivic

3 April 2016
17:00

India	0–4	Ireland
	Report	O'Flanagan 25'; Daly 29'; Watkins 37'; Frazer 44'

Hawke's Bay Sports Park
Umpires:
Junko Wagatsuma
Kim Yoon-Seon

5 April 2016
16:00

China	2–1	India
Yu 45'; Wang 55'	Report	Rani 19'

Hawke's Bay Sports Park
Umpires:
Lelia Sacre
Amber Church

5 April 2016
18:00

New Zealand	3–1	Ireland
Punt 32'; Michelsen 52'; Harrison 54'	Report	Evans 9'

Hawke's Bay Sports Park
Umpires:
Laurine Delforge
Kim Yoon-Seon

=== Second round ===
Fifth place
India	1 (3)
Ireland (p.s.o.)	1 (4)
Seventh place
Canada	1
South Korea	3

Consolation semifinals
India	1
Canada	0
South Korea	3 (0)
Ireland (p.s.o.)	3 (1)

Quarterfinals
Japan	3
India	1
China	1
Canada	0
New Zealand	6
South Korea	0
Australia	3
Ireland	0

Semifinals
Japan	1
China	0
New Zealand	3
Australia	2

Final
Japan	2
New Zealand	3
Third place
China	1
Australia	3

==== Quarter-finals ====
7 April 2016
10:00

Japan	3–1	India
Shimizu 5'; Mitsuhashi 6'; Kawamura 7'	Report	Rani 14'

Hawke's Bay Sports Park
Umpires:
Amber Church
Kim Yoon-Seon

7 April 2016
12:15

China	1–0	Canada
Peng 1'	Report

Hawke's Bay Sports Park
Umpires:
Durgi Devi
Alison Keogh

7 April 2016
14:30

Australia	3–0	Ireland
Parker 11', 56'; Nelson 40'	Report

Hawke's Bay Sports Park
Umpires:
Laurine Delforge
Lelia Sacre

7 April 2016
16:45

New Zealand	6–0	South Korea
Merry 9'; Cocks 19'; Punt 21', 60'; Charlton 47'; Hayward 60'	Report

Hawke's Bay Sports Park
Umpires:
Fanneke Alkemade
Junko Wagatsuma

==== Fifth to eighth place classification ====
===== Crossover =====
9 April 2016
11:30

India	1–0	Canada
Minz 43'	Report

Hawke's Bay Sports Park
Umpires:
Fanneke Alkemade
Junko Wagatsuma

9 April 2016
13:45

South Korea	3–3	Ireland
Cheon Seul-ki 8', 29'; Kim Bo-mi 17'	Report	Carroll 46'; Watkins 59'; Tice 59'
Penalties
Cheon Eun-bi (penalty shoot-out missed); Park Seung-a (penalty shoot-out missed); Kim Da Rae (penalty shoot-out missed); Kim Ok-ju (penalty shoot-out missed); Kim Bo-mi (penalty shoot-out missed)	0–1	(penalty shoot-out missed) Watkins; (penalty shoot-out missed) Frazer; (penalty shoot-out scored) O'Flanagan; (penalty shoot-out missed) Pinder; (penalty shoot-out missed) Daly

Hawke's Bay Sports Park
Umpires:
Amber Church
Lelia Sacre

===== Seventh and eighth place =====
10 April 2016
10:30

Canada	1–3	South Korea
Stairs 26'	Report	Cheon Eun-bi 31'; Park Seung-a 46'; Kim Jong-eun 55'

Hawke's Bay Sports Park
Umpires:
Durgi Devi
Alison Keogh

===== Fifth and sixth place =====
10 April 2016
12:45

India	1–1	Ireland
Toppo 25'	Report	Duke 19'
Penalties
Navjot (penalty shoot-out scored); Minz (penalty shoot-out scored); Poonam (penalty shoot-out missed); Kataria (penalty shoot-out scored); Navneet (penalty shoot-out missed)	3–4	(penalty shoot-out scored) Watkins; (penalty shoot-out scored) Frazer; (penalty shoot-out missed) O'Flanagan; (penalty shoot-out scored) Pinder; (penalty shoot-out scored) Daly

Hawke's Bay Sports Park
Umpires:
Melissa Trivic
Lelia Sacre

==== First to fourth place classification ====
===== Semi-finals =====
9 April 2016
16:00

Japan	1–0	China
H. Nagai 28'	Report

Hawke's Bay Sports Park
Umpires:
Melissa Trivic
Kim Yoon-Seon

9 April 2016
18:15

New Zealand	3–2	Australia
Harrison 24'; Merry 30'; Hayward 45'	Report	Slattery 14', 22'

Hawke's Bay Sports Park
Umpires:
Laurine Delforge
Miao Lin

===== Third and fourth place =====
10 April 2016
15:00

China	1–3	Australia
Xi 45'	Report	Stewart 2'; Morgan 33'; Kenny 38'

Hawke's Bay Sports Park
Umpires:
Amber Church
Fanneke Alkemade

===== Final =====
10 April 2016
17:15

Japan	2–3	New Zealand
Nakagawa 55'; Nakashima 60'	Report	Merry 4'; Flynn 9'; Whitelock 33'

Hawke's Bay Sports Park
Umpires:
Laurine Delforge
Miao Lin

== Statistics ==
=== Final standings ===
As per statistical convention in field hockey, matches decided in extra time are counted as wins and losses, while matches decided by penalty shoot-outs are counted as draws.

Pos	Team	Pld	W	D	L	GF	GA	GD	Pts	Status
1st place, gold medalist(s)	New Zealand	6	6	0	0	19	6	+13	18	Gold Medal
2nd place, silver medalist(s)	Japan	6	4	1	1	16	8	+8	13	Silver Medal
3rd place, bronze medalist(s)	Australia	6	4	1	1	15	5	+10	13	Bronze Medal
4	China	6	3	0	3	9	8	+1	9	
5	Ireland	6	1	2	3	9	14	−5	5	
6	India	6	1	1	4	4	11	−7	4	
7	South Korea	6	1	1	4	8	17	−9	4	
8	Canada	6	1	0	5	5	16	−11	3	

Source: FIH

=== Goalscorers ===
There were 85 goals scored in 24 matches, for an average of 3.54 goals per match.

5 goals

- (Japan) Mie Nakashima

4 goals

- (Australia) Georgina Parker
- (Australia) Grace Stewart
- (New Zealand) Olivia Merry

3 goals

- (New Zealand) Gemma Flynn
- (New Zealand) Anita Punt

2 goals

- (Australia) Jodie Kenny
- (Australia) Georgina Morgan
- (Australia) Kathryn Slattery
- (Canada) Brienne Stairs
- (China) Wang Mengyu
- (India) Ritu Rani
- (Ireland) Chloe Watkins
- (Japan) Motomi Kawamura
- (Japan) Aki Mitsuhashi
- (Japan) Hazuki Nagai
- (Japan) Minami Shimizu
- (New Zealand) Sophie Cocks
- (New Zealand) Charlotte Harrison
- (New Zealand) Pippa Hayward
- (South Korea) Kim Bo-Mi
- (South Korea) Cheon Seul-Ki

1 goal

- (Australia) Ashleigh Nelson
- (Canada) Danielle Hennig
- (Canada) Holly Stewart
- (Canada) Amanda Woodcroft
- (China) Li Jiaqi
- (China) Liang Meiyu
- (China) Yu Qian
- (China) Song Qingling
- (China) Zhang Xiaoxue
- (China) Xi Xiayun
- (China) Peng Yang
- (India) Lilima Minz
- (India) Namita Toppo
- (Ireland) Naomi Carroll
- (Ireland) Nicola Daly
- (Ireland) Deirdre Duke
- (Ireland) Nicola Evans
- (Ireland) Megan Frazer
- (Ireland) Anna O'Flanagan
- (Ireland) Elena Tice
- (Japan) Yuri Nagai
- (Japan) Miyuki Nakagawa
- (Japan) Akane Shibata
- (New Zealand) Samantha Charlton
- (New Zealand) Stacey Michelsen
- (New Zealand) Kayla Whitelock
- (South Korea) Cheon Eun-Bi
- (South Korea) Kim Jong-Eun
- (South Korea) Park Ki-Ju
- (South Korea) Park Seung-A

Source: FIH
