= Julia Sonntag =

German field hockey player

Personal information
- Born: Julia Ciupka; 1 November 1991 (age 34) Mönchengladbach, Germany

Sport
- Sport: Field hockey
- Position: Goalkeeper
- Club: Rot-Weiss Köln
National team
Years	Team	Caps	Goals
2016–	Germany	32	(0)
Medal record
EuroHockey Championship
Silver medal – second place	2019 Antwerp
Silver medal – second place	2021 Amstelveen
Silver medal – second place	2025 Mönchengladbach
Bronze medal – third place	2023 Mönchengladbach

Julia Sonntag ( née Ciupka, born 1 November 1991) is a German field hockey player for the German national team.

She participated at the 2018 Women's Hockey World Cup.
