= Niels Thijssen =

Belgian field hockey coach (born 1983)

Niels Thijssen (born 27 January 1983) is a Belgian field hockey coach of the Belgian women's national team.

He coached the team at the 2018 Women's Hockey World Cup.
