= 2014 Women's Hockey Champions Challenge I =

International field hockey tournament

2014 FIH Women's Champions Challenge I

Tournament details
- Host country: Scotland
- City: Glasgow
- Teams: 8
- Venue: Glasgow National Hockey Centre

Final positions
- Champions: United States (1st title)
- Runner-up: Ireland
- Third place: South Africa

Tournament statistics
- Matches played: 24
- Goals scored: 86 (3.58 per match)
- Top scorer(s): (South Korea) Park Mi-Hyun (United States) Katie O'Donnell (5 goals)
- Best player: (Ireland) Megan Frazer

The 2014 Women's Hockey Champions Challenge I was the 8th and last edition of the field hockey championship for women. It was held from 27 April to 4 May 2014 in Glasgow, Scotland. The tournament doubled as the qualifier to the 2016 Champions Trophy as the winner earned an automatic berth to compete.

The United States won the tournament for the first time after defeating Ireland 3–1 in the final, earning an automatic berth at the 2016 Champions Trophy after their absence in the previous fifteen editions. South Africa won the third place match by defeating Spain 1–0.

== Qualification ==
The following eight teams announced by the FIH competed in this tournament.

- Scotland (Host nation)
- South Korea (Seventh in 2012 Champions Trophy)
- United States (Second in 2012 Champions Challenge I)
- Ireland (Third in 2012 Champions Challenge I)
- Belgium (Fifth in 2012 Champions Challenge I)
- South Africa (Sixth in 2012 Champions Challenge I)
- India (Seventh in 2012 Champions Challenge I)
- Spain (Highest ranked team not qualified for the next Champions Trophy or Champions Challenge I)

== Results ==
All times are British Summer Time (UTC+01:00)

=== First round ===
==== Pool A ====
Pos	Team	Pld	W	D	L	GF	GA	GD	Pts
1	South Korea	3	2	1	0	8	5	+3	7
2	Belgium	3	2	0	1	8	3	+5	6
3	Scotland	3	1	1	1	7	4	+3	4
4	India	3	0	0	3	2	13	−11	0

Source: FIH
Rules for classification: 1) points; 2) goal difference; 3) goals scored; 4) head-to-head result.

27 April 2014
14:30

Belgium	2–1	Scotland
Van Lindt 39'; Nelen 53'	Report	Bell 14'

Umpires:
Chen Hong (CHN)
Vilma Bagdanskiene (LTU)

27 April 2014
16:30

South Korea	4–2	India
Park M. 14'; Kim J. 24'; Cheon E. 28'; Lee Y. 42'	Report	Kataria 12'; Poonam 69'

Umpires:
Maggie Giddens (USA)
Carolina de la Fuente (ARG)

28 April 2014
19:00

India	0–4	Scotland
	Report	Kidd 30'; Maguire 33'; Bunce 41'; Ward 66'

Umpires:
Liu Xiaoying (CHN)
Fanneke Alkemade (NED)

28 April 2014
21:00

Belgium	1–2	South Korea
De Groof 49'	Report	Park M. 27', 52'

Umpires:
Stephanie Judefind (USA)
Amber Church (NZL)

30 April 2014
14:00

South Korea	2–2	Scotland
Kim O. 12'; Kim J. 57'	Report	Clement 30', 49'

Umpires:
Gabriele Schmitz (GER)
Carolina de la Fuente (ARG)

30 April 2014
16:00

India	0–5	Belgium
	Report	Simons 33'; Boon 38'; Versavel 41'; Puvrez 64'; Van Lindt 69'

Umpires:
Emi Yamada (JPN)
Maggie Giddens (USA)

==== Pool B ====
Pos	Team	Pld	W	D	L	GF	GA	GD	Pts
1	United States	3	2	0	1	7	3	+4	6
2	South Africa	3	1	2	0	5	4	+1	5
3	Spain	3	0	2	1	4	6	−2	2
4	Ireland	3	0	2	1	4	7	−3	2

Source: FIH
Rules for classification: 1) points; 2) goal difference; 3) goals scored; 4) head-to-head result.

27 April 2014
10:00

United States	3–1	Spain
O'Donnell 30'; Vittese 47'; González 55'	Report	Riera 62'

Umpires:
Amber Church (NZL)
Fanneke Alkemade (NED)

27 April 2014
12:00

South Africa	2–2	Ireland
Damons 11'; Chamberlain 49'	Report	Carroll 44'; O'Flynn 58'

Umpires:
Liu Xiaoying (CHN)
Stephanie Judefind (USA)

28 April 2014
14:00

South Africa	2–1	United States
Deetlefs 45'; Plessis 50'	Report	O'Donnell 12'

Umpires:
Emi Yamada (JPN)
Carolina de la Fuente (ARG)

28 April 2014
16:00

Spain	2–2	Ireland
Magaz 10'; Riera 13'	Report	Beatty 62', 66'

Umpires:
Gabriele Schmitz (GER)
Maggie Giddens (USA)

30 April 2014
09:30

Spain	1–1	South Africa
Gómez 26'	Report	Deetlefs 33'

Umpires:
Amber Church (NZL)
Vilma Bagdanskiene (LTU)

30 April 2014
11:30

United States	3–0	Ireland
Nichols 7'; Sharkey 18'; O'Donnell 24'	Report

Umpires:
Liu Xiaoying (CHN)
Chen Hong (CHN)

=== Second round ===
Quarterfinals
1 May 2014
South Korea	1
Ireland	2
1 May 2014
South Africa	2
Scotland	1
1 May 2014
Belgium	1 (2)
Spain (p.s.o)	1 (3)
1 May 2014
United States	1
India	0

Semi-finals
3 May 2014
Ireland	2
South Africa	1
3 May 2014
Spain	1
United States	3

Final
4 May 2014
Ireland	1
United States	3
Third place match
4 May 2014
South Africa	1
Spain	0

==== Quarterfinals ====
1 May 2014
13:00

South Korea	1–2	Ireland
Han 49'	Report	Mullan 3'; O'Flanagan 57'

Umpires:
Emi Yamada (JPN)
Gabriele Schmitz (GER)

1 May 2014
15:15

Belgium	1–1	Spain
Gerniers 31'	Report	Ybarra 6'
Penalties
De Scheemaekere (penalty shoot-out missed); Nelen (penalty shoot-out missed); De Groof (penalty shoot-out missed); Gerniers (penalty shoot-out scored); Raes (penalty shoot-out scored); Gerniers (penalty shoot-out missed)	2–3	(penalty shoot-out missed) Bonastre; (penalty shoot-out scored) Magaz; (penalty shoot-out scored) Riera; (penalty shoot-out missed) Salvatella; (penalty shoot-out missed) Pérez; (penalty shoot-out scored) Magaz

Umpires:
Liu Xiaoying (CHN)
Vilma Bagdanskiene (LTU)

1 May 2014
18:00

South Africa	2–1	Scotland
Russell 1', 38'	Report	Maguire 64'

Umpires:
Fanneke Alkemade (NED)
Stephanie Judefind (USA)

1 May 2014
20:15

United States	1–0	India
Dawson 59'	Report

Umpires:
Amber Church (NZL)
Chen Hong (CHN)

==== Fifth to eighth place classification ====
Crossover
3 May 2014
South Korea	3
Scotland	2
3 May 2014
Belgium	4
India	2

Fifth place match
4 May 2014
South Korea (p.s.o)	1 (2)
Belgium	1 (1)
Seventh place match
4 May 2014
Scotland	4
India	3

===== Crossover =====
3 May 2014
09:00

South Korea	3–2	Scotland
Cheon S. 3'; Park M. 50'; Kim D. 53'	Report	Wyllie 7'; Ralph 65'

Umpires:
Gabriele Schmitz (GER)
Fanneke Alkemade (NED)

3 May 2014
11:15

Belgium	4–2	India
De Vos 20'; Sinia 28', 60'; Versavel 45'	Report	Poonam 25'; Monika 44'

Umpires:
Stephanie Judefind (USA)
Carolina de la Fuente (ARG)

===== Seventh and eighth place =====
4 May 2014
10:30

Scotland	4–3	India
Bunce 44', 67'; Wyllie 64'; Clement 68'	Report	Goyal 46'; Minz 51'; Navneet 63'

Umpires:
Maggie Giddens (USA)
Vilma Bagdanskiene (LTU)

===== Fifth and sixth place =====
4 May 2014
12:45

South Korea	1–1	Belgium
Park M. 52'	Report	De Vos 49'
Penalties
Park M. (penalty shoot-out scored); Kim D. (penalty shoot-out missed); Cho E. (penalty shoot-out missed); Cheon E. (penalty shoot-out scored)	2–1	(penalty shoot-out missed) Gerniers; (penalty shoot-out scored) De Scheemaekere; (penalty shoot-out missed) De Groof; (penalty shoot-out missed) Nelen; (penalty shoot-out missed) Raes

Umpires:
Emi Yamada (JPN)
Stephanie Judefind (USA)

==== First to fourth place classification ====
===== Semi-finals =====
3 May 2014
14:00

Ireland	2–1	South Africa
Frazer 16'; Evans 46'	Report	Evans 8'

Umpires:
Maggie Giddens (USA)
Chen Hong (CHN)

3 May 2014
16:15

Spain	1–3	United States
Riera 56'	Report	O'Donnell 10'; Sharkey 12'; Witmer 33'

Umpires:
Emi Yamada (JPN)
Liu Xiaoying (CHN)

===== Third and fourth place =====
4 May 2014
15:30

South Africa	1–0	Spain
Chamberlain 67'	Report

Umpires:
Amber Church (NZL)
Chen Hong (CHN)

===== Final =====
4 May 2014
17:45

Ireland	1–3	United States
Smyth 3'	Report	Selenski 25'; Nichols 35'; O'Donnell 48'

Umpires:
Carolina de la Fuente (ARG)
Fanneke Alkemade (NED)

== Awards ==
The following awards were presented at the conclusion of the tournament:

Player of the Tournament	Top Goalscorers	Goalkeeper of the Tournament	Young Player of the Tournament
(Ireland) Megan Frazer	(South Korea) Park Mi-Hyun (United States) Katie O'Donnell	(Ireland) Emma Gray	(United States) Emily Wold

== Statistics ==
=== Final ranking ===
As per statistical convention in field hockey, matches decided in extra time are counted as wins and losses, while matches decided by penalty shoot-outs are counted as draws.

Pos	Team	Pld	W	D	L	GF	GA	GD	Pts	Status
1st place, gold medalist(s)	United States	6	5	0	1	14	5	+9	15	Qualified for 2016 Champions Trophy
2nd place, silver medalist(s)	Ireland	6	2	2	2	9	12	−3	8	
3rd place, bronze medalist(s)	South Africa	6	3	2	1	9	7	+2	11	
4	Spain	6	0	3	3	6	11	−5	3	
5	South Korea	6	3	2	1	13	10	+3	11	
6	Belgium	6	3	2	1	14	7	+7	11	
7	Scotland	6	2	1	3	14	12	+2	7	
8	India	6	0	0	6	7	22	−15	0	

Source: FIH

=== Goalscorers ===
There were 86 goals scored in 24 matches, for an average of 3.58 goals per match.

5 goals

- (South Korea) Park Mi-Hyun
- (United States) Katie O'Donnell

3 goals

- (Scotland) Vikki Bunce
- (Scotland) Linda Clement
- (Spain) Lola Riera

2 goals

- (Belgium) Charlotte De Vos
- (Belgium) Emilie Sinia
- (Belgium) Lieselotte van Lindt
- (Belgium) Louise Versavel
- (India) Poonam Rani
- (Ireland) Emily Beatty
- (Scotland) Emily Maguire
- (Scotland) Ailsa Wyllie
- (South Africa) Dirkie Chamberlain
- (South Africa) Lisa-Marie Deetlefs
- (South Africa) Shelley Russell
- (South Korea) Kim Jong-Eun
- (United States) Caroline Nichols
- (United States) Kathleen Sharkey

1 goal

- (Belgium) Jill Boon
- (Belgium) Stephanie De Groof
- (Belgium) Alix Gerniers
- (Belgium) Barbara Nelen
- (Belgium) Emma Puvrez
- (Belgium) Manon Simons
- (India) Neha Goyal
- (India) Vandana Kataria
- (India) Navneet Kaur
- (India) Lilima Minz
- (India) Monika
- (Ireland) Naomi Carroll
- (Ireland) Nicola Evans
- (Ireland) Megan Frazer
- (Ireland) Kathryn Mullan
- (Ireland) Anna O'Flanagan
- (Ireland) Audrey O'Flynn
- (Ireland) Emma Smyth
- (Scotland) Alison Bell
- (Scotland) Nikki Kidd
- (Scotland) Catriona Ralph
- (Scotland) Rebecca Ward
- (South Africa) Sulette Damons
- (South Africa) Lilian di Plessis
- (South Africa) Celia Evans
- (South Korea) Kim Da-Rae
- (South Korea) Cheon Eun-Bi
- (South Korea) Han Hye-Lyoung
- (South Korea) Kim Ok-Ju
- (South Korea) Cheon Seul-Ki
- (South Korea) Lee Young-Sil
- (Spain) María Gómez
- (Spain) Alicia Magaz
- (Spain) Rocío Ybarra
- (United States) Rachel Dawson
- (United States) Melissa González
- (United States) Paige Selenski
- (United States) Michelle Vittese
- (United States) Jill Witmer

Source: FIH
