= Melanie García =

Spanish field hockey player (born 1990)

Personal information
- Full name: Melanie García Afonso
- Born: 21 September 1990 (age 35)

Sport
- Sport: Field hockey
- Position: Goalkeeper
- Club: Real Club de Polo de Barcelona
National team
Years	Team	Caps	Goals
–	Spain	50	(0)
Medal record
World Cup
Bronze medal – third place	2018 London
European Championship
Bronze medal – third place	2019 Antwerp

Melanie García Afonso (born 21 September 1990) is a Spanish field hockey player for the Spanish national team.

She participated at the 2018 Women's Hockey World Cup, where Spain won the bronze medal.
