= 2015 EuroHockey Club Champions Cup =

Tournament details
- Host country: Netherlands
- City: Bilthoven
- Dates: 3–6 April
- Teams: 8 (from 6 associations)
- Venue: Sportpark Kees Boekelaan

Final positions
- Champions: (Netherlands) SCHC (1st title)
- Runner-up: (Netherlands) Den Bosch
- Third place: (Spain) Club de Campo

Tournament statistics
- Matches played: 12
- Goals scored: 54 (4.5 per match)
- Top scorer: (Netherlands) Maartje Paumen (6 goals)
- Best player: (Netherlands) Lidewij Welten

The 2015 EuroHockey Club Champions Cup was the 43rd edition of the premier European competition for women's field hockey clubs. The tournament was played in Bilthoven, Netherlands from 3 to 6 April 2015.

The hosts SCHC won their first title by defeating the defending champions Den Bosch in the final.

== Results ==
=== Bracket ===
Quarter-finals
3 April
(England) Surbiton	1 (0)
(Spain) Club de Campo (s.o)	1 (2)
3 April
(Netherlands) Den Bosch	9
(Russia) Izmailovo	0
3 April
(Germany) Rot-Weiss Köln	2
(Ireland) UCD	1
3 April
(England) Canterbury	2 (0)
(Netherlands) SCHC (s.o)	2 (2)

Semi-finals
4 April
(Spain) Club de Campo	0
(Netherlands) Den Bosch	4
4 April
(Germany) Rot-Weiss Köln	1
(Netherlands) SCHC	2

Final
6 April
(Netherlands) Den Bosch	2 (2)
(Netherlands) SCHC (s.o)	2 (3)
Third place
6 April
(Spain) Club de Campo	4
(Germany) Rot-Weiss Köln	0

=== Quarter-finals ===
3 April 2015
10:30

Surbiton (England)	1–1	(Spain) Club de Campo
Coulson 41'	Report	Gutiérrez 54'
Penalties
Page (penalty shoot-out missed); Tibble (penalty shoot-out missed); Haycroft (penalty shoot-out missed); Herbert (penalty shoot-out missed)	0–2	(penalty shoot-out scored) Gutiérrez; (penalty shoot-out scored) Magaz; (penalty shoot-out missed) Gil

Umpires:
Laurine Delforge (BEL)
Alwiene Sterk (NED)

3 April 2015
12:45

Rot-Weiss Köln (Germany)	2–1	(Ireland) UCD
Gablać 31'; Stöckel 37'	Report	O'Flanagan 48'

Umpires:
Hannah Sanders (ENG)
Ymkje van Slooten (NED)

3 April 2015
15:00

Den Bosch (Netherlands)	9–0	(Russia) Izmailovo
Krekelaar 2'; Paumen 16', 25', 40', 69'; Vorstenbosch 38', 38'; Hulsen 53'; Keetels 69'	Report

Umpires:
Gabriele Schmitz (GER)
Vilma Bagdanskiene (LTU)

3 April 2015
17:15

Canterbury (England)	2–2	(Netherlands) SCHC
Wilson 34'; Baldson 65'	Report	Dirkse van den Heuvel 26'; Van Maasakker 52'
Penalties
Townsend (penalty shoot-out missed); Chamberlain (penalty shoot-out missed); Rowe (penalty shoot-out missed); Kerly (penalty shoot-out missed)	0–2	(penalty shoot-out scored) Stöckel; (penalty shoot-out scored) Dirkse van den Heuvel; (penalty shoot-out missed) Drost

Umpires:
Sarah Wilson (SCO)
Celine Martin-Schmets (BEL)

=== Fifth to eighth place classification ===
Cross-overs
5 April
(England) Surbiton	3
(Russia) Izmailovo	2
5 April
(Ireland) UCD	3
(England) Canterbury	2

Fifth place
6 April
(England) Surbiton	4
(Ireland) UCD	1
Seventh place
6 April
(Russia) Izmailovo	1
(England) Canterbury	5

==== Cross-overs ====
5 April 2015
10:45

Surbiton (England)	3–2	(Russia) Izmailovo
Webb 3'; Herbert 23', 55'	Report	Shamina 8'; Timshina 42'

Umpires:
Gabriele Schmitz(GER)
Ymkje van Slooten (NED)

5 April 2015
13:00

UCD (Ireland)	3–2	(England) Canterbury
Watkins 11'; Beatty 18'; Duke 29'	Report	Triggs 8'; Wilson 36'

Umpires:
Vilma Bagdanskiene (LTU)
Laurine Delforge (BEL)

==== Seventh and eighth place ====
6 April 2015
09:00

Izmailovo (Russia)	1–5	(England) Canterbury
Vasileva 44'	Report	Lloyd 3'; Chamberlain 19'; Baker 20', 32'; Clewlow 47'

Umpires:
Celine Martin-Schmets (BEL)
Michelle Meister (GER)

==== Fifth and sixth place ====
6 April 2015
11:15

Surbiton (England)	4–1	(Ireland) UCD
Herbert 22'; Twigg 41'; King 55'; Hunter 59'	Report	Mullan 52'

Umpires:
Gabriele Schmitz (GER)
Alwiene Sterk (NED)

=== First to fourth place classification ===
==== Semi-finals ====
4 April 2015
13:00

Club de Campo (Spain)	0–4	(Netherlands) Den Bosch
	Report	Vorstenbosch 7', 31', 63'; Paumen 58'

Umpires:
Michelle Meister (GER)
Sarah Wilson (SCO)

4 April 2015
15:15

Rot-Weiss Köln (Germany)	1–2	(Netherlands) SCHC
Grambusch 60'	Report	Zerbo 27'; Koopman 46'

Umpires:
Elena Eskina (RUS)
Hannah Sanders (ENG)

==== Third place ====
6 April 2015
13:30

Club de Campo (Spain)	4–0	(Germany) Rot-Weiss Köln
Pérez 20', 21'; Iglesias 26'; López 68'	Report

Umpires:
Elena Eskina (RUS)
Hannah Sanders (ENG)

==== Final ====
6 April 2015
15:45

Den Bosch (Netherlands)	2–2	(Netherlands) SCHC
Krekelaar 21'; Paumen 69'	Report	Van Maasakker 6', 9'
Penalties
Keetels (penalty shoot-out missed); Hulsen (penalty shoot-out scored); Matla (penalty shoot-out missed); Krekelaar (penalty shoot-out missed); Vorstenbosch (penalty shoot-out scored); Vorstenbosch (penalty shoot-out missed)	2–3	(penalty shoot-out scored) Stöckel; (penalty shoot-out missed) Dirkse van den Heuvel; (penalty shoot-out scored) Drost; (penalty shoot-out missed) Van Maasakker; (penalty shoot-out missed) Jaspers; (penalty shoot-out scored) Stöckel

Umpires:
Laurine Delforge (BEL)
Sarah Wilson (SCO)

== Statistics ==
=== Final standings ===
1. (Netherlands) SCHC
2. (Netherlands) Den Bosch
3. (Spain) Club de Campo
4. (Germany) Rot-Weiss Köln
5. (England) Surbiton
6. (Ireland) UCD
7. (England) Canterbury
8. (Russia) Izmailovo

=== Awards ===
Individual player awards:

- Player of the Tournament: Lidewij Welten (Netherlands) Den Bosch
- Top goalscorer: Maartje Paumen (Netherlands) Den Bosch
- Goalkeeper of the Tournament: María Ruiz (Spain) Club de Campo

== See also ==
- 2014–15 Euro Hockey League
- 2015 Women's EuroHockey Club Trophy
