= Katie Mullan =

Ireland women's hockey international

Personal information
- Full name: Kathryn Mullan
- Born: 7 April 1994 (age 32) Coleraine, County Londonderry, Northern Ireland

Sport
- Sport: Field hockey
- Position: Forward
Youth career
- Team
- –: Dalriada School
Senior career
Years	Team	Caps	Goals
20xx–2012	Ballymoney	-	-
2012–2018	UCD Ladies	-	-
2018–2019	Club an der Alster	-	-
2019-2024	Ballymoney	-	-
2024-	Rarh Bengal Tigers	-	-
National team
Years	Team	Caps	Goals
2012–	Ireland	154	(30)
Medal record
FIH World Cup
Silver medal – second place	2018 London
FIH Nations Cup
Silver medal – second place	2023–24 Terrassa
Silver medal – second place	2024–25 Santiago

Kathryn "Katie" Mullan (born 7 April 1994) is an Ireland women's field hockey international player from Coleraine, Northern Ireland. She was captain of the Ireland team that played in the 2018 Women's Hockey World Cup final. Mullan has also won Irish Senior Cup and Women's Irish Hockey League titles with UCD. Mullan has also played camogie for CLG Eoghan Rua and helped them win the 2010 All-Ireland Intermediate Club Camogie championship.

== Early years and education ==
Mullan is originally from Coleraine, County Londonderry, Northern Ireland. She has four siblings - two older brothers, Bernard and Aidan, and two younger sisters, Brega and Olivia. She attended Dalriada School in Ballymoney. Mullan completed a BSc in engineering science in 2017, and her master's degree (ME) in biomedical engineering in 2018 at University College Dublin.

== Camogie ==
Mullan played camogie for CLG Eoghan Rua. She was a member of the Eoghan Rua team that won the 2010 All-Ireland Intermediate Club Camogie Championship. She came on as a substitute in the semi-final against Lismore and scored the winning goal in a closely contested match. She also came on as a substitute in the final, a 3–8 to 2–3 win over The Harps of Laois. In 2013 Mullan scored two goals in the Derry Senior Camogie Championship final victory against Slaughtneil. She also scored 1–1 in the Ulster Senior Club Camogie Championship final against Rossa. Eoghan Rua retained the Derry Senior Camogie Championship title in 2014 and Mullan scored 1–4 in the final win over Slaughtneil.

== Field hockey ==
=== Early years ===
Mullan began playing women's field hockey at Dalriada School where her PE teacher and hockey coach was Bridget McKeever, a former Ireland women's field hockey international. She also played for Ballymoney.

=== UCD ===
Mullan started playing for UCD in 2012. She was a member of the UCD teams that won the Irish Senior Cup in 2014, 2017 and 2018. She scored UCD's third goal in the 2018 final when they defeated Pegasus 4–0. Mullan was also a member of the UCD teams that won Women's Irish Hockey League titles in 2013–14, 2016–17 and 2017–18. In 2017 UCD completed a treble when they also won the EY Champions Trophy after defeating Hermes-Monkstown in a penalty shoot-out. Mullan has also played for UCD in the 2015 and 2018 EuroHockey Club Champions Cups.

=== Ireland international ===
Mullan represented Ireland at Under-17 and Under-18 levels before making her senior debut against Wales in August 2012. Together with Roisin Upton and Emily Beatty, Mullan represented Ireland at the 2010 Youth Olympic Games.

In March 2015 Mullan was a member of the Ireland team that won a 2014–15 Women's FIH Hockey World League Round 2 tournament hosted in Dublin, defeating Canada in the final after a penalty shoot-out. She was also a member of the Ireland team that won the 2015 Women's EuroHockey Championship II, scoring in the final as they defeated the Czech Republic 5–0. In January 2017 she was also a member of the Ireland team that won a 2016–17 Women's FIH Hockey World League Round 2 tournament in Kuala Lumpur. She again scored in the final as Ireland defeated Malaysia 3–0.

Mullan took over as Ireland captain from Megan Frazer, who was kept out of the side through injuries. She remained captain throughout Ireland's 2018 Women's Hockey World Cup campaign, leading them to the silver medal. She featured in all of Ireland's games throughout the tournament, including the pool games against the United States, India, and England, the quarter-final against India, the semi-final against Spain and the final against the Netherlands.

Tournaments	Place
2010 Youth Olympic Games	5th
2012 Women's Hockey Champions Challenge I	3rd
2012–13 Women's FIH Hockey World League Round 2	4th
2014 Women's Hockey Champions Challenge I	2nd
2014–15 Women's FIH Hockey World League	15th
→ 2015 Dublin Tournament	1st
2015 Women's EuroHockey Championship II	1st
2016 Hawke's Bay Cup	5th
2016–17 Women's FIH Hockey World League	13th
→ 2017 Kuala Lumpur Tournament	1st
2017 Women's Four Nations Cup	2nd
2017 Women's EuroHockey Nations Championship	6th
2018 Women's Hockey World Cup	2nd place, silver medalist(s)
2018–19 Women's FIH Series Finals	2nd
2019 Women's EuroHockey Nations Championship	5th

== Honours ==
=== Field hockey ===
Ireland

- Women's Hockey World Cup
  - Runners Up: 2018
- Women's FIH Hockey World League
  - Winners: 2015 Dublin, 2017 Kuala Lumpur
- Women's EuroHockey Championship II
  - Winners: 2015
- Women's Hockey Champions Challenge I
  - Runners Up: 2014
- Women's FIH Hockey Series
  - Runners Up: 2019 Banbridge
- Women's Four Nations Cup
  - Runners Up: 2017

UCD

- Women's Irish Hockey League
  - Winners: 2013–14, 2016–17, 2017–18
- Irish Senior Cup
  - Winners: 2013–14, 2016–17, 2017–18
  - Runners Up: 2012–13
- EY Champions Trophy
  - Winners: 2017
- UCD Alumni Award in Sport 2019

=== Camogie ===
CLG Eoghan Rua

- All-Ireland Intermediate Club Camogie
  - Winners: 2010
- Ulster Senior Club Camogie Championship
  - Winners: 2013
- Derry Senior Camogie Championship
  - Winners: 2013, 2014
