= 2018 EuroHockey Club Champions Cup =

European field hockey competition in London, England

EHCCC 2018

Tournament details
- Host country: England
- City: London
- Dates: 17–20 May 2018
- Teams: 8
- Venue: 1

Final positions
- Champions: (Netherlands) Den Bosch (16th title)
- Runner-up: (Germany) Hamburg
- Third place: (Spain) Club de Campo

Tournament statistics
- Matches played: 12
- Goals scored: 46 (3.83 per match)
- Top scorer: (Netherlands) Charlotte Vega (4 goals)
- Best player: (Netherlands) Eva de Goede

The 2018 EuroHockey Club Champions Cup was the 46th edition of the premier European competition for women's field hockey clubs. HC Den Bosch were the defending champions, having won their 15th title in the 2017 EuroHockey Club Champions Cup. The tournament took place from 17 to 20 May. Eight teams from six countries participated in the tournament.

== Teams ==
- (Belarus) Victorya Smolevichi
- (England) Surbiton
- (Germany) Hamburg
- (Germany) Mannheimer
- (Ireland) UCD
- (Netherlands) Amsterdam
- (Netherlands) Den Bosch
- (Spain) Club de Campo

== Results ==
=== Bracket ===
Quarter-finals
17 May
(Netherlands) Amsterdam	8
(Ireland) UCD	0
17 May
(Germany) Mannheimer HC	0
(Germany) UHC Hamburg	1
17 May
(Netherlands) Den Bosch	5
(Belarus) Victorya	0
17 May
(Spain) Club de Campo	2
(England) Surbiton	0

Semi-finals
19 May
(Netherlands) Amsterdam	1 (4)
(Germany) UHC Hamburg (p.s.o)	1 (5)
19 May
(Netherlands) Den Bosch	3
(Spain) Club de Campo	1

Final
20 May
(Germany) UHC Hamburg	1
(Netherlands) Den Bosch	2
Third place
20 May
(Netherlands) Amsterdam	1
(Spain) Club de Campo	2

==== Quarter-finals ====
17 May 2018
12:15

Mannheimer (Germany)	0–1	(Germany) Hamburg
	Report	Hoffmann 12'

Umpires:
Fanneke Alkemade (NED)
Anne van den Bosch (BEL)

17 May 2018
14:30

Amsterdam (Netherlands)	8–0	(Ireland) UCD
Jonker 1', 49'; Müller 9'; Vega 18', 33', 50'; Verschoor 20', 57'	Report

Umpires:
Gabriele Schmitz (GER)
Ivona Makar (CRO)

17 May 2018
16:45

Den Bosch (Netherlands)	5–0	(Belarus) Victorya
Van den Assem 21'; Keetels 23'; Krekelaar 24'; Van Geffen 28'; Hulsen 37'	Report

Umpires:
Hannah Harrison (ENG)
Alison Keogh (IRL)

17 May 2018
19:00

Club de Campo (Spain)	2–0	(England) Surbiton
Abajo 10'; Grote 58'	Report

Umpires:
Kim Jung-hee (KOR)
Michelle Meister (GER)

=== Fifth to eighth place classification ===
Crossover
19 May
(Ireland) UCD	1
(Germany) Mannheimer HC	2
19 May
(Belarus) Victorya (p.s.o)	2 (3)
(England) Surbiton	2 (2)

Fifth place
20 May
(Germany) Mannheimer HC	7
(Belarus) Victorya	0
Seventh place
20 May
(Ireland) UCD	0
(England) Surbiton	4

==== Crossover ====
18 May 2018
16:45

UCD (Ireland)	1–2	(Germany) Mannheimer
Clarke 21'	Report	Förter 23'; Pohl 54'

Umpires:
Anne van den Bosch (BEL)
Hannah Harrison (ENG)

18 May 2018
19:00

Victorya (Belarus)	2–2	(England) Surbiton
Litasava 19'; Khmylova 58'	Report	Twigg 4'; Payne 43'
Penalties
	3–2

Umpires:
Fanneke Alkemade (NED)
Gabriele Schmitz (GER)

==== Seventh and eighth place ====
20 May 2018
09:30

UCD (Ireland)	0–4	(England) Surbiton
	Report	Ansley 35'; Twigg 39'; Martin 56'; Middleton 60'

Umpires:
Gabriele Schmitz (GER)
Anne van den Bosch (BEL)

==== Fifth and sixth place ====
20 May 2018
11:45

Mannheimer (Germany)	7–0	(Belarus) Victorya
Lorenz 6'; Nobis 14'; Haase 14'; Lyer 23', 26'; Willig 43'; Magaz 44'	Report

Umpires:
Fanneke Alkemade (NED)
Ivona Makar (CRO)

=== First to fourth place classification ===
==== Semi-finals ====
19 May 2018
12:00

Amsterdam (Netherlands)	1–1	(Germany) Hamburg
Vega 51'	Report	Van Bodegom 13'
Penalties
Verschoor (penalty shoot-out scored); Veen (penalty shoot-out scored); Stam (penalty shoot-out missed); De Goede (penalty shoot-out scored); Albers (penalty shoot-out scored) —— Verschoor (penalty shoot-out missed)	4–5	(penalty shoot-out scored) R. Müller-Wieland; (penalty shoot-out scored) Seifert; (penalty shoot-out scored) Mävers; (penalty shoot-out scored) Teschke; (penalty shoot-out missed) Frank —— (penalty shoot-out scored) Mävers

Umpires:
Alison Keogh (IRL)
Kim Jung-hee (KOR)

19 May 2018
14:15

Den Bosch (Netherlands)	3–1	(Spain) Club de Campo
Hulsen 6'; Van den Assem 38'; Verbruggen 43'	Report	Grote 41'

Umpires:
Ivona Makar (CRO)
Michelle Meister (GER)

==== Third place ====
20 May 2018
14:00

Amsterdam (Netherlands)	1–2	(Spain) Club de Campo
Jonker 17'	Report	Grote 5'; Pérez 28'

Umpires:
Michelle Meister (GER)
Hannah Harrison (ENG)

==== Final ====
20 May 2018
16:15

Hamburg (Germany)	1–2	(Netherlands) Den Bosch
Frank 51'	Report	Matla 45'; Van der Plas 59'

Umpires:
Kim Jung-hee (KOR)
Alison Keogh (IRL)

== Final ranking ==
Rank	Team
1st place, gold medalist(s)	(Netherlands) 's-Hertogenbosch
2nd place, silver medalist(s)	(Germany) Hamburg
3rd place, bronze medalist(s)	(Spain) Club de Campo
4	(Netherlands) Amsterdam
5	(Germany) Mannheimer HC
6	(Belarus) Victorya
7	(England) Surbiton
8	(Ireland) UCD
