= 2022–23 Men's Euro Hockey League =

Tournament details
- Host countries: Germany; Netherlands
- Dates: 29 September 2022 – 10 April 2023
- Teams: 20 (from 11 associations)
- Venue: 2 (in 2 host cities)

Final positions
- Champions: (Netherlands) Bloemendaal (6th title)
- Runner-up: (Germany) Rot-Weiss Köln
- Third place: (Belgium) Racing

Tournament statistics
- Matches played: 26
- Goals scored: 152 (5.85 per match)
- Top scorer: Alexander Hendrickx (Pinoké) (10 goals)

The 2022–23 Men's Euro Hockey League was the 16th season of the Euro Hockey League, Europe's men's premier club field hockey tournament, organized by the European Hockey Federation.

The first round was held from 30 September to 2 October 2022 and the Final8 took place from 6 to 10 April 2023.

Bloemendaal were the defending champions, having won a record fifth title in the previous edition. They defended their title after defeating Rot-Weiss Köln 1–0 in the final.

== Association team allocation ==
Location of teams of the 2022–23 Euro Hockey League
Location of Benelux teams in 2022–23 Euro Hockey League

A total of 20 teams from 11 of the 45 EHF member associations participated in the 2022–23 Men's Euro Hockey League. The association ranking based on the EHL country coefficients was used to determine the number of participating teams for each association:

- Associations 1–3 each had three teams qualify.
- Associations 4–6 each had two teams qualify.
- Associations 7–11 each had one team qualify.

=== Association ranking ===
For the 2022–23 Euro Hockey League, the associations were allocated places according to their 2021–22 EHL country coefficients, which takes into account their performance in European competitions from 2019–20 to 2021–22.

Association ranking for the 2022–23 Men's Euro Hockey League: Rank / Change / Association / Points / Teams; 1 / ▲1 / Netherlands / 39.417 / 3; 2 / ▼1 / Germany / 37.792 / 3; 3 / Steady / Spain / 35.563 / 3; 4 / Steady / Belgium / 31.875 / 2; 5 / Steady / England / 31.563 / 2; 6 / ▲1 / France / 25.250 / 2; 7 / ▼1 / Austria / 24.844 / 1; 8 / ▲2 / Scotland / 14.844 / 1; 9 / ▲3 / Switzerland / 13.344 / 1; 10 / ▲1 / Ireland / 11.313 / 1; Rank / Change / Association / Points / Teams; 11 / ▼3 / Belarus / 8.594 / 0 (Note: Belarusian and Russian clubs were excluded from participation due to the 2022 Russian invasion of Ukraine.); 12 / ▼2 / Russia / 8.594 / 0; 13 / ▲4 / Czech Republic / 8.563 / 1; 14 / ▲4 / Portugal / 7.813 / 0; 15 / ▼2 / Wales / 6.906 / 0; 16 / ▼2 / Ukraine / 6.844 / 0; 17 / ▲2 / Denmark / 4.313 / 0; 18 / ▼2 / Italy / 2.875 / 0; 19 / ▼5 / Poland / 2.594 / 0; 20 / Steady / Croatia / 0.813 / 0

=== Teams ===
The labels in the parentheses show how each team qualified for the place of its starting round:

- 1st, 2nd, 3rd: League positions of the previous season

Qualified teams for 2022–23 Euro Hockey League
Entry round	Teams	
Quarter-finals	(Netherlands) Bloemendaal (1st)	(Germany) Rot-Weiss Köln (1st)
Quarter-finals	(Spain) Atlètic Terrassa (1st)	(Belgium) Racing (1st)
Preliminary round	(Netherlands) Pinoké (2nd)	(Netherlands) Amsterdam (3rd)
Preliminary round	(Germany) Hamburger Polo Club (2nd)	(Germany) Harvestehuder THC (3rd)
Preliminary round	(Spain) Real Club de Polo (2nd)	(Spain) Club Egara (3rd)
Preliminary round	(Belgium) Gantoise (2nd)	(England) Old Georgians (1st)
Preliminary round	(England) Wimbledon (2nd)	(France) Montrouge (1st)
Preliminary round	(France) Lille (2nd)	(Austria) Arminen (1st)
Preliminary round	(Scotland) Western Wildcats (1st)	(Switzerland) Rotweiss Wettingen (1st)
Preliminary round	(Ireland) Lisnagarvey (1st)	(Czech Republic) Slavia Prague (1st)

== Preliminary round ==
The preliminary round was hosted by Harvestehuder THC in Hamburg, Germany from 29 September to 2 October 2022. The draw took place on 18 July 2022. The winners of the second round advanced to the quarter-finals during Easter 2023.

=== Bracket ===
First round
29 September
(France) Lille	1
(Netherlands) Amsterdam	6
29 September
(Switzerland) Rotweiss Wettingen	0
(Belgium) Gantoise	7
29 September
(France) Montrouge	0
(Ireland) Lisnagarvey	4
29 September
(England) Wimbledon	0
(Germany) Hamburger Polo Club	4
1 October
(Netherlands) Pinoké	16
(Czech Republic) Slavia Prague	0
1 October
(Austria) Arminen	0
(England) Old Georgians	4
1 October
(Spain) Real Club de Polo	5
(Spain) Club Egara	2
1 October
(Scotland) Western Wildcats	1
(Germany) Harvestehuder THC	9

Second round
30 September
(Netherlands) Amsterdam	1 (2)
(Belgium) Gantoise (s.o.)	1 (4)
30 September
(Ireland) Lisnagarvey	1
(Germany) Hamburger Polo Club	7
2 October
(Netherlands) Pinoké	3
(England) Old Georgians	1
2 October
(Spain) Real Club de Polo	0
(Germany) Harvestehuder THC	3

=== First round ===
29 September 2022
12:15

Lille (France)	1–6	(Netherlands) Amsterdam
Bonomi 53'	Report	Burkhardt 3', 44'; Pruyser 14'; Rupinder 27', 50'; Dawson 53'

Umpires:
Benjamin Messerli (SUI)
Sean Edwards (ENG)

29 September 2022
14:30

Rotweiss Wettingen (Switzerland)	0–7	(Belgium) Gantoise
	Report	Duvekot 13', 16', 34'; Molenaer 35'; Madeley 44'; Murray 52'; T. Clément 55'

Umpires:
Xavier Fenaer (FRA)
Daniël Veerman (NED)

29 September 2022
16:45

Montrouge (France)	0–4	(Ireland) Lisnagarvey
	Report	Corry 4'; T. Chambers 7'; Williamson 11'; Nelson 44'

Umpires:
Rachel Williams (ENG)
Antonio Ilgrande (ITA)

29 September 2022
19:00

Wimbledon (England)	0–4	(Germany) Hamburger Polo Club
	Report	Staib 5', 35'; Smith 17'; Russell 49'

Umpires:
Jakub Mejzlik (CZE)
Celine Martin-Schmets (BEL)

1 October 2022
10:30

Arminen (Austria)	0–4	(England) Old Georgians
	Report	J. Carson 6'; Ward 37', 45'; Proctor 43'

Umpires:
Antonio Ilgrande (ITA)
Celine Martin-Schmets (BEL)

1 October 2022
12:45

Pinoké (Netherlands)	16–0	(Czech Republic) Slavia Prague
Hendrickx 1', 15', 29', 38', 53'; Landbrug 2', 27'; Bukkens 3', 24', 41', 42'; Sutorius 10'; Van der Valk 23'; Dockier 45'; Aardenburg 52'; Schoenaker 55'	Report

Umpires:
Jaroslav Suchocki (LTU)
Tim Meissner (GER)

1 October 2022
15:00

Real Club de Polo (Spain)	5–2	(Spain) Club Egara
Miralles 2', 36'; Terradas 28'; Ruiz 54'; Fortuño 60'	Report	X. Gispert 28'; Aguilar 38'

Umpires:
Sean Edwards (ENG)
Daniël Veerman (NED)

1 October 2022
17:15

Western Wildcats (Scotland)	1–9	(Germany) Harvestehuder THC
F. Moran 42'	Report	Frey 9', 60'; Glander 10', 24', 42'; Körper 18', 33', 47', 56'

Umpires:
Rachel Williams (ENG)
Xavier Fenaert (FRA)

=== Ranking matches ===
30 September 2022
12:15

Lille (France)	2–2	(Switzerland) Rotweiss Wettingen
Lockwood 11', 29'	Report	Winkler 18', 59'
Penalties
Lockwood (penalty shoot-out scored); Ponthieu (penalty shoot-out scored); Paz (penalty shoot-out scored)	3–0	(penalty shoot-out missed) Y. Morard; (penalty shoot-out missed) Kirschbaum; (penalty shoot-out missed) Flück

Umpires:
Jaroslav Suchocki (LTU)
Celine Martin-Schmets (BEL)

30 September 2022
16:45

Montrouge (France)	3–5	(England) Wimbledon
Mazurier 29'; Montecot 30'; Poupee 37'	Report	Darlington 12'; Hooper 35'; Francis 39'; Horler 41'; Condon 46'

Umpires:
Daniël Veerman (NED)
Benjamin Messerli (BEL)

2 October 2022
09:45

Slavia Prague (Czech Republic)	2–4	(Austria) Arminen
Bodnár 43'; Brzák 47'	Report	Uher 15+', 32'; A. Bele 17'; Campe 44'

Umpires:
Jaroslav Suchocki (LTU)
Rachel Williams (ENG)

2 October 2022
14:15

Club Egara (Spain)	3–1	(Scotland) Western Wildcats
Aguilar 33'; Mercadé 50'; Amat 59'	Report	Mackenzie 47'

Umpires:
Xavier Fenaert (FRA)
Benjamin Messerli (SUI)

=== Second round ===
30 September 2022
14:30

Amsterdam (Netherlands)	1–1	(Belgium) Gantoise
Pruyser 36'	Report	Duvekot 42'
Penalties
Middendorp (penalty shoot-out scored); Pruyser (penalty shoot-out scored); Verga (penalty shoot-out missed); Burkhardt (penalty shoot-out missed)	2–4	(penalty shoot-out scored) Murray; (penalty shoot-out scored) Kina; (penalty shoot-out scored) Murray; (penalty shoot-out scored) Duvekot

Umpires:
Tim Meissner (GER)
Antonio Ilgrande (ITA)

30 September 2022
19:00

Lisnagarvey (Ireland)	1–7	(Germany) Hamburger Polo Club
Kidd 32'	Report	Russell 2', 9', 35', 49'; Inglis 53'; Bartels 53'; Staib 59'

Umpires:
Sean Edwards (ENG)
Rachel Williams (ENG)

2 October 2022
12:00

Pinoké (Netherlands)	3–1	(England) Old Georgians
Landbrug 26'; Dockier 37'; Bukkens 56'	Report	Morton 59'

Umpires:
Celine Martin-Schmets (BEL)
Tim Meissner (GER)

2 October 2022
16:30

Real Club de Polo (Spain)	0–3	(Germany) Harvestehuder THC
	Report	Hasbach 28'; Frey 29'; Glander 43'

Umpires:
Sean Edwards (ENG)
Daniël Veerman (NED)

== Final8 ==
The Final8 was hosted by Pinoké at the Wagener Stadium in Amstelveen, Netherlands from 6 to 10 April 2023 alongside the women's tournament. The draw was held on 14 December 2022.

=== Bracket ===
Quarter-finals
6 April
(Netherlands) Bloemendaal	7
(Germany) Harvestehuder THC	2
6 April
(Netherlands) Pinoké	2
(Belgium) Racing	3
7 April
(Spain) Atlètic Terrassa (s.o.)	2 (3)
(Belgium) Gantoise	2 (2)
7 April
(Germany) Hamburger Polo Club	4 (0)
(Germany) Rot-Weiss Köln (s.o.)	4 (3)

Semi-finals
8 April
(Netherlands) Bloemendaal	4
(Belgium) Racing	1
9 April
(Spain) Atlètic Terrassa	3 (3)
(Germany) Rot-Weiss Köln (s.o.)	3 (4)

Final
10 April
(Netherlands) Bloemendaal	1
(Germany) Rot-Weiss Köln	0
Third place
10 April
(Belgium) Racing	3
(Spain) Atlètic Terrassa	0

=== Quarter-finals ===
6 April 2023
17:00

Bloemendaal (Netherlands)	7–2	(Germany) Harvestehuder THC
T. Brinkman 2', 42'; Swaen 34', 53'; Van der Veen 37'; Beins 47'; Hiebendaal 59'	Report	Glander 11'; Körper 57'

Umpires:
Laurine Delforge (BEL)
Sean Edwards (ENG)

6 April 2023
19:15

Pinoké (Netherlands)	2–3	(Belgium) Racing
Landbrug 6'; Hendrickx 25'	Report	Malherbe 11', 17'; Cosyns 49'

Umpires:
Antonio Ilgrande (ITA)
Tim Meissner (GER)

7 April 2023
09:30

Hamburger Polo Club (Germany)	4–4	(Germany) Rot-Weiss Köln
Russell 6', 17'; Silanoglu 34'; Staib 36'	Report	Pelzner 15'; Prinz 45'; M. Grambusch 52'; Van der Weerden 58'
Penalties
Inglis (penalty shoot-out missed); Woods (penalty shoot-out missed); Smith (penalty shoot-out missed)	0–3	(penalty shoot-out scored) Große; (penalty shoot-out scored) Trompertz; (penalty shoot-out scored) Mazkour

Umpires:
Harry Collinson (ENG)
Sebastien Michielsen (BEL)

7 April 2023
18:00

Atlètic Terrassa (Spain)	2–2	(Belgium) Gantoise
Tarres 14'; Cabré-Verdiell 57'	Report	M. Deplus 17'; Hellin 52'
Penalties
Malgosa (penalty shoot-out scored); Pe. Cunill (penalty shoot-out scored); Bonastre (penalty shoot-out scored); Figa (penalty shoot-out missed); Cabré-Verdiell (penalty shoot-out missed)	3–2	(penalty shoot-out scored) Kina; (penalty shoot-out scored) Masson; (penalty shoot-out missed) Murray; (penalty shoot-out missed) Duvekot; (penalty shoot-out missed) T. Deplus

Umpires:
Antonio Ilgrande (ITA)
Paul van den Assum (NED)

=== Ranking matches ===
8 April 2023
11:30

Harvestehuder THC (Germany)	4–5	(Netherlands) Pinoké
Körper 18', 56'; Losonci 19'; Ntuli 36'	Report	Hendrickx 14', 30', 44', 58'; Aardenburg 39'

Umpires:
Sebastien Michielsen (BEL)
Laurine Delforge (BEL)

9 April 2023
16:00

Gantoise (Belgium)	2–2	(Germany) Hamburger Polo Club
T. Clément 15'; Hellin 46'	Report	Russell 3'; Smith 9'
Penalties
T. Clément (penalty shoot-out scored); Tynevez (penalty shoot-out scored); Esquelin (penalty shoot-out missed); M. Deplus (penalty shoot-out scored)	3–1	(penalty shoot-out missed) Staib; (penalty shoot-out missed) Inglis; (penalty shoot-out missed) Thörnblom; (penalty shoot-out scored) Mink

Umpires:
Hannah Harrison (ENG)
Antonio Ilgrande (ITA)

=== Semi-finals ===
8 April 2023
13:45

Bloemendaal (Netherlands)	4–1	(Belgium) Racing
Swaen 19'; Bovendeert 35'; J. Brinkman 54'; Wortelboer 60'	Report	Cayphas 50'

Umpires:
Sean Edwards (ENG)
Tim Meissner (GER)

9 April 2023
13:45

Atlètic Terrassa (Spain)	3–3	(Germany) Rot-Weiss Köln
Pe. Cunill 20', 52'; Castello 53'	Report	Rühr 22'; Seitz 25'; Mazkour 30'
Penalties
Malgosa (penalty shoot-out scored); Pe. Cunill (penalty shoot-out missed); Cabré-Verdiell (penalty shoot-out scored); Bonastre (penalty shoot-out scored); Salles (penalty shoot-out missed)	3–4	(penalty shoot-out scored) Große; (penalty shoot-out scored) Trompertz; (penalty shoot-out scored) Mazkour; (penalty shoot-out missed) Prinz; (penalty shoot-out scored) M. Grambusch

Umpires:
Sebastien Michielsen (BEL)
Paul van den Assum (NED)

=== Third and fourth place ===
10 April 2023
11:30

Racing (Belgium)	3–0	(Spain) Atlètic Terrassa
Cosyns 30', 32', 47'	Report

Umpires:
Harry Collinson (ENG)
Paul van den Assum (NED)

=== Final ===
10 April 2023
16:15

Bloemendaal (Netherlands)	1–0	(Germany) Rot-Weiss Köln
Beins 21'	Report

Umpires:
Sean Edwards (ENG)
Sebastien Michielsen (BEL)

== Top goalscorers ==
Rank	Player	Team	FG	PC	PS	Goals
1	(Belgium) Alexander Hendrickx	(Netherlands) Pinoké	0	8	2	10
2	(New Zealand) Kane Russell	(Germany) Hamburger Polo Club	0	6	2	8
3	(Austria) Michael Körper	(Germany) Harvestehuder THC	4	3	0	7
4	(Netherlands) Miles Bukkens	(Netherlands) Pinoké	5	0	0	5
4	(Germany) Paul Glander	(Germany) Harvestehuder THC	1	4	0	5
6	(Belgium) Roman Duvekot	(Belgium) Gantoise	4	0	0	4
6	(Netherlands) Marlon Landbrug	(Netherlands) Pinoké	4	0	0	4
6	(Germany) Constantin Staib	(Germany) Hamburger Polo Club	4	0	0	4
6	(Belgium) Tanguy Cosyns	(Belgium) Racing	0	4	0	4
10	(Austria) Moritz Frey	(Germany) Harvestehuder THC	3	0	0	3
10	(Netherlands) Tim Swaen	(Netherlands) Bloemendaal	0	3	0	3

== See also ==
- 2023 Men's EuroHockey Club Trophy I
- 2023 Men's EuroHockey Indoor Club Cup
- 2023 Women's Euro Hockey League
