= 2021–22 Men's Belgian Hockey League =

Belgian Hockey League
- Season: 2021–22
- Dates: 5 September 2021 – 8 May 2022
- Champions: Racing (6th title)
- Relegated: Antwerp; Beerschot
- Euro Hockey League: Gantoise; Racing
- Top goalscorer: Tanguy Cosyns (30 goals)
- Biggest home win: Léopold 8–1 Herakles
- Biggest away win: Antwerp 1–11 Gantoise
- Highest scoring: Antwerp 1–11 Gantoise

The 2021–22 Men's Belgian Hockey League was the 102nd season of the Men's Belgian Hockey League, the top men's Belgian field hockey league.

The season started on 5 September 2021 and concluded on 8 May 2022 with the second match of the championship final. Dragons were the defending champions. Racing won their sixth league title by defeating Gantoise 5–4 on aggregate in the championship final.

== Changes from 2020–21 ==
This season was played with 12 instead of 14 teams again. Each team played each other twice and the top four teams advanced to the championship play-offs. The bottom two teams were relegated directly and the team in 10th place played a relegation play-off against the third placed team from the second division.

== Teams ==
2021–22 Men's Belgian Hockey League teams
Location of Brussels teams in the 2021–22 Men's Belgian Hockey League

Team	Location	Province
Antwerp	Sint-Job-in-'t-Goor	Antwerp
Beerschot	Kontich	Antwerp
Braxgata	Boom	Antwerp
Daring	Molenbeek-Saint-Jean	Brussels
Dragons	Brasschaat	Antwerp
Gantoise	Ghent	East Flanders
Herakles	Lier	Antwerp
Léopold	Uccle	Brussels
Leuven	Heverlee	Flemish Brabant
Orée	Woluwe-Saint-Pierre	Brussels
Racing	Uccle	Brussels
Waterloo Ducks	Waterloo	Walloon Brabant

=== Number of teams by provinces ===
Province	Number of teams	Team(s)
Antwerp	5	Antwerp, Beerschot, Braxgata, Dragons, Herakles
Brussels	4	Daring, Léopold, Orée, Racing
East Flanders	1	Gantoise
Flemish Brabant	1	Leuven
Walloon Brabant	1	Waterloo Ducks
Total	12	

== Regular season ==
=== Standings ===
Pos	Team	Pld	W	D	L	GF	GA	GD	Pts	Qualification or relegation
1	Waterloo Ducks	22	12	6	4	58	31	+27	42	Qualification for the play-offs
2	Racing (C)	22	11	7	4	64	41	+23	40	Qualification for the Euro Hockey League and the play-offs
3	Braxgata	22	11	7	4	52	42	+10	40	Qualification for the play-offs
4	Gantoise	22	10	6	6	63	43	+20	36	Qualification for the Euro Hockey League and the play-offs
5	Herakles	22	9	6	7	54	46	+8	33	
6	Leuven	22	9	6	7	47	42	+5	33	
7	Dragons	22	9	3	10	50	42	+8	30	
8	Daring	22	8	5	9	50	50	0	29	
9	Orée	22	9	1	12	50	66	−16	28	
10	Léopold (O)	22	7	2	13	46	74	−28	23	Qualification for the relegation play-offs
11	Beerschot (R)	22	5	5	12	43	64	−21	20	Relegation to the National 1
12	Antwerp (R)	22	4	2	16	42	78	−36	14	Relegation to the National 1

Rules for classification: 1) points; 2) matches won; 3) goal difference; 4) goals for; 5) head-to-head result.
(C) Champions; (O) Play-off winners; (R) Relegated

=== Results ===
Home \ Away	ANT	BEE	BRA	DAR	DRA	GAN	HER	LÉO	LEU	ORÉ	RAC	WD
Antwerp	—	4–5	1–3	2–1	0–1	1–11	1–5	5–0	3–1	3–4	0–4	1–6
Beerschot	3–2	—	2–0	2–3	3–2	4–4	2–2	4–4	0–2	3–5	2–3	0–4
Braxgata	3–2	3–2	—	1–1	2–5	1–1	1–1	4–3	1–1	3–1	3–2	1–1
Daring	2–1	3–0	2–2	—	1–2	3–1	2–1	5–0	1–3	5–2	3–3	4–4
Dragons	3–3	2–3	4–5	2–1	—	2–3	4–0	5–0	3–1	6–0	2–4	0–0
Gantoise	5–0	3–3	4–2	1–2	0–1	—	3–2	0–3	0–5 (Note: Leuven was awarded a 5–0 win because Gantoise fielded two ineligible players. The original match finished 3–3.)	3–1	1–0	3–2
Herakles	2–1	4–1	3–2	4–2	1–1	5–3	—	5–0	1–1	4–1	2–2	1–2
Léopold	0–5 (Note: Antwerp was awarded a 0–5 win because a member of the Léopold staff who was suspended was present at the match. The original match finished 5–1.)	3–1	0–5	6–1	5–2	0–5	8–1	—	2–2	0–5	0–5	0–3
Leuven	4–3	0–0	0–2	5–4	1–0	2–2	3–2	5–0	—	1–2	4–4	1–2
Orée	5–0	3–2	2–3	2–1	3–1	1–7	2–6	2–5	1–2	—	4–3	1–3
Racing	3–3	5–1	2–2	2–2	4–2	1–1	2–0	3–1	4–2	4–2	—	3–2
Waterloo Ducks	7–1	3–0	1–2	4–1	2–0	2–2	2–2	1–6	5–1	1–1	1–0	—

Legend: Blue = home team win; Yellow = draw; Red = away team win.

== Play-offs ==
=== Bracket ===
Semi-finals
Waterloo Ducks	1	4	5
Gantoise (s.o.)	2	3	5
Racing	1	3	4
Braxgata	2	1	3

Final
Gantoise	2	2	4
Racing	2	3	5
Third place
8 May – Louvain-la-Neuve
Waterloo Ducks	3
Braxgata	2

=== Semi-finals ===
30 April 2022
12:30

Gantoise	2–1	Waterloo Ducks
Masson 28'; De Borrekens 30'	Report	Charlet 45'

Ghent

1 May 2022
12:30

Waterloo Ducks	4–3	Gantoise
Charlet 20', 33'; Wilbers 44', 52'	Report	De Paeuw 13'; Rogeau 42'; Scheen 54'
Penalties
Boccard (penalty shoot-out scored); Van Oost (penalty shoot-out scored); Esquelin (penalty shoot-out missed); Wilbers (penalty shoot-out scored); Charlet (penalty shoot-out scored); Boccard (penalty shoot-out missed)	4–5	(penalty shoot-out scored) Kina; (penalty shoot-out scored) Hellin; (penalty shoot-out missed) Tynevez; (penalty shoot-out scored) Ferreiro; (penalty shoot-out scored) De Paeuw; (penalty shoot-out scored) Ferreiro

Waterloo

5–5 on aggregate. Gantoise won the shoot-out 5–4.

30 April 2022
12:30

Braxgata	2–1	Racing
Mazzilli 13'; Onana 47'	Report	Charlier 41'

Boom

1 May 2022
12:30

Racing	3–1	Braxgata
Cosyns 3'; Charlier 18'; Truyens 40'	Report	Luypaert 2'

Uccle

Racing won 4–3 on aggregate.

=== Third place game ===
8 May 2022
11:00

Waterloo Ducks	3–2	Braxgata
Wilbers 17'; Willems 34'; Charlet 70'	Report	Van Cleynenbreugel 26'; Rossi 68'

Louvain-la-Neuve

=== Final ===
7 May 2022
16:00

Gantoise	2–2	Racing
Scheen 7', 25'	Report	Charlier 53'; Cosyns 68'

Louvain-la-Neuve

8 May 2022
16:00

Racing	3–2	Gantoise
Cosyns 32', 43', 44'	Report	De Borrekens 18', 58'

Louvain-la-Neuve

Racing won 5–4 on aggregate and won their sixth league title.

== Relegation play-offs ==
=== Overview ===
Team 1	Agg.	Team 2	1st leg	2nd leg
Léopold	12–3	Mechelse	6–2	6–1

=== Matches ===
7 May 2022
15:00

Léopold	6–2	Mechelse
A. Verdussen 23'; Cuvelier 25'; Degroote 31'; Boon 34', 36', 41'	Report	Flack 43'; Mondo 53'

Uccle

8 May 2022
15:00

Mechelse	1–6	Léopold

Mechelen

Léopold won 12–3 on aggregate, and therefore both clubs remained in their respective leagues.

== Top goalscorers ==
Rank	Player	Club	FG	PC	PS	Goals
1	(Belgium) Tanguy Cosyns	Racing	8	17	5	30
2	(Belgium) Tom Boon	Léopold	10	8	8	26
3	(Belgium) Loïck Luypaert	Braxgata	0	17	4	21
4	(France) Victor Charlet	Waterloo Ducks	0	19	0	19
5	(Argentina) Tomas Domene	Orée	2	15	1	18
6	(Belgium) Cédric Charlier	Racing	14	2	0	16
7	(New Zealand) Sam Lane	Leuven	9	5	0	14
8	(Belgium) Arthur De Sloover	Beerschot	3	6	3	12
8	(Argentina) Nicolás Della Torre	Dragons	1	9	2	12
8	(Netherlands) Pepijn Scheen	Gantoise	0	8	4	12

== See also ==
- 2021–22 Women's Belgian Hockey League
