= 2021–22 Feldhockey-Bundesliga =

Bundesliga
- Season: 2021–22
- Dates: 4 September 2021 – 5 June 2022
- Champions: Rot-Weiss Köln (10th title)
- Relegated: Frankfurt 1880; Nürnberger HTC
- Euro Hockey League: Hamburger Polo Club; Harvestehuder THC; Rot-Weiss Köln
- Matches: 96
- Goals: 528 (5.5 per match)
- Top goalscorer: Gonzalo Peillat (31 goals)
- Biggest home win: Rot-Weiss Köln 9–0 Nürnberger HTC; Harvestehude 10–1 Nürnberger HTC; Rot-Weiss Köln 9–0 TSV Mannheim; Mülheim 9–0 Nürnberger HTC
- Biggest away win: Nürnberger HTC 0–11 Harvestehude
- Highest scoring: Harvestehude 10–1 Nürnberger HTC; Hamburger PC 8–3 Frankfurt 1880; Mülheim 5–6 Alster; Nürnberger HTC 3–8 Hamburger PC; Nürnberger HTC 0–11 Harvestehude

The 2021–22 Feldhockey-Bundesliga was the 79th season of the Men's Feldhockey Bundesliga, Germany's premier field hockey league.

The season started on 4 September and concluded on 5 June 2022 with the championship final. Rot-Weiss Köln are the defending champions. They defended their title by defeating Hamburger Polo Club 1–0 in the championship final.

== Teams ==
2021–22 Feldhockey-Bundesliga teams
Location of Hamburg teams

A total of 12 teams participate in the 2021–22 edition of the Bundesliga. The promoted teams are Frankfurt 1880 and Düsseldorfer HC who replaced Crefelder HTC and Grossflottbeker THGC.

Team	Location	State
Berliner HC	Berlin	Berlin
Club an der Alster	Hamburg	Hamburg
Düsseldorfer HC	Düsseldorf	North Rhine-Westphalia
Frankfurt 1880	Frankfurt	Hesse
Hamburger Polo Club	Hamburg	Hamburg
Harvestehuder THC	Hamburg	Hamburg
Mannheimer HC	Mannheim	Baden-Württemberg
Nürnberger HTC	Nuremberg	Bavaria
Rot-Weiss Köln	Cologne	North Rhine-Westphalia
TSV Mannheim	Mannheim	Baden-Württemberg
UHC Hamburg	Hamburg	Hamburg
Uhlenhorst Mülheim	Mülheim	North Rhine-Westphalia

=== Number of teams by state ===
State	Number of teams	Clubs
Hamburg	4	Club an der Alster, Hamburger Polo Club, Harvestehuder THC and UHC Hamburg
North Rhine-Westphalia	3	Düsseldorfer HC, Rot-Weiss Köln and Uhlenhorst Mülheim
Baden-Württemberg	2	Mannheimer HC and TSV Mannheim
Berlin	1	Berliner HC
Bavaria	1	Nürnberger HTC
Hesse	1	Frankfurt 1880
Total	12	

== Regular season ==
=== Standings ===
==== Pool A ====
Pos	Team	Pld	W	D	L	GF	GA	GD	Pts	Qualification
1	Rot-Weiss Köln	16	13	1	2	61	15	+46	40	Qualification for the play-offs
2	Hamburger Polo Club	16	12	2	2	69	34	+35	38	Qualification for the play-offs
3	Club an der Alster	16	8	3	5	46	40	+6	27	Qualification for the play-offs
4	Berliner HC	16	7	1	8	42	34	+8	22	Qualification for the play-offs
5	TSV Mannheim	16	1	6	9	17	52	−35	9	Qualification for the play-downs
6	Frankfurt 1880	16	0	5	11	26	61	−35	5	Qualification for the play-downs

Source: hockey.de

==== Pool B ====
Pos	Team	Pld	W	D	L	GF	GA	GD	Pts	Qualification
1	Mannheimer HC	16	12	1	3	70	28	+42	37	Qualification for the play-offs
2	Harvestehuder THC	16	11	1	4	64	29	+35	34	Qualification for the play-offs
3	Uhlenhorst Mülheim	16	10	3	3	65	36	+29	33	Qualification for the play-offs
4	UHC Hamburg	16	3	4	9	27	34	−7	13	Qualification for the play-offs
5	Düsseldorfer HC	16	3	2	11	23	72	−49	11	Qualification for the play-downs
6	Nürnberger HTC	16	1	1	14	18	93	−75	4	Qualification for the play-downs

Source: hockey.de

=== Results ===
Home \ Away	BHC	ALS	DHC	FRA	HPC	HAR	MHC	NÜR	RWK	TSV	UHC	UHL
Berliner HC	—	3–5	5–1	7–2	1–3	—	—	—	1–3	5–1	2–1	1–3
Club an der Alster	1–5	—	—	3–1	4–4	—	1–0	6–0	0–4	5–0	1–0	—
Düsseldorfer HC	—	0–6	—	2–2	—	1–9	2–3	5–2	—	1–3	3–3	0–10
Frankfurt 1880	1–5	2–2	—	—	3–6	2–4	2–7	—	0–0	3–3	—	2–3
Hamburger Polo Club	3–2	5–3	8–1	8–3	—	2–3	—	—	1–2	5–0	—	2–2
Harvestehuder THC	2–0	7–0	2–1	—	—	—	3–4	10–1	—	1–0	1–0	3–2
Mannheimer HC	5–1	—	6–1	—	3–4	5–1	—	9–1	2–0	—	6–0	4–5
Nürnberger HTC	1–3	—	1–2	2–1	3–8	0–11	1–6	—	—	—	0–3	4–6
Rot-Weiss Köln	1–0	3–2	6–0	6–1	1–2	5–2	—	9–0	—	9–0	—	—
TSV Mannheim	1–1	1–1	—	1–1	1–4	—	1–4	2–2	0–5	—	2–2	—
UHC Hamburg	—	—	0–1	2–0	2–4	2–2	3–4	3–0	3–4	—	—	1–1
Uhlenhorst Mülheim	—	5–6	6–2	—	—	4–3	2–2	9–0	1–3	3–1	3–2	—

Source: hockey.de
Legend: Blue = home team win; Yellow = draw; Red = away team win.

=== Top goalscorers ===
Rank	Player	Club	Goals
1	(Argentina) Gonzalo Peillat	Mannheimer HC	31
2	(New Zealand) Kane Russell	Hamburger Polo Club	29
3	(Germany) Malte Hellwig	Uhlenhorst Mülheim	16
3	(Austria) Michael Körper	Harvestehuder THC	16
5	(Germany) Masi Pfandt	Harvestehuder THC	15
6	(Germany) Niklas Bruns	Club an der Alster	12
7	(Germany) Paul Smith	Hamburger Polo Club	11
8	(Germany) Christopher Rühr	Rot-Weiss Köln	10
8	(Germany) Justus Weigand	Mannheimer HC	10
8	(Germany) Constantin Staib	Hamburger Polo Club	10
8	(Germany) Raphael Hartkopf	Mannheimer HC	10
8	(Germany) Elian Mazkour	Rot-Weiss Köln	10

== Play-downs ==
The play-downs took place from 14 May to 4 June 2022 and were played in a best of five format.

=== Overview ===
Team 1	Series	Team 2	Game 1	Game 2	Game 3	Game 4	Game 5
TSV Mannheim	3–0	Nürnberger HTC	1–0	3–1	5–2		
Düsseldorfer HC	3–2	Frankfurt 1880	0–3	1–0	2–4	4–1	2–2 (3–2 s.o.)

=== Matches ===
14 May 2022
15:00

TSV Mannheim	1–0	Nürnberger HTC
Proske 17'	Report

TSV Mannheim Hockey, Mannheim

15 May 2022
12:00

TSV Mannheim	3–1	Nürnberger HTC
Goerdt 18'; Rothländer 24'; Wossidlo 53'	Report	Büttner 34'

TSV Mannheim Hockey, Mannheim

28 May 2022
15:00

Nürnberger HTC	0–5	TSV Mannheim
	Report	Proske 3', 59'; Benke 35'; Wossidlo 36'; Rothländer 60'

Nürnberger HTC, Nuremberg

TSV Mannheim won series 3–0 and stayed in the Bundesliga while Nürnberger HTC were relegated to the 2. Bundesliga..

14 May 2022
14:00

Düsseldorfer HC	0–3	Frankfurt 1880
	Report	Werner 45'; Hautzel 54'; Meurer 58'

Düsseldorfer HC, Düsseldorf

15 May 2022
12:00

Düsseldorfer HC	1–0	Frankfurt 1880
Stollarz 9'	Report

Düsseldorfer HC, Düsseldorf

28 May 2022
14:00

Frankfurt 1880	4–2	Düsseldorfer HC
Dahlinger 15'; Werner 23'; J. Schmidt-Opper 29'; Hautzel 37'	Report	Dames 39'; Cofalla 55'

Sportanlage SC 1880, Frankfurt

29 May 2022
12:00

Frankfurt 1880	1–4	Düsseldorfer HC
Meurer 55'	Report	Giskes 3', 48'; Braun 47'; Hartkopf 60'

Sportanlage SC 1880, Frankfurt

4 June 2022
12:30

Düsseldorfer HC	2–2	Frankfurt 1880
	Report
Penalties
	3–2

Düsseldorfer HC, Düsseldorf

Düsseldorfer HC won series 3–2 and stayed in the Bundesliga while Frankfurt 1880 were relegated to the 2. Bundesliga..

== Play-offs ==
The quarter-finals were played in a best of three format with the first match hosted by the weaker-placed team on 14 or 15 May and the return match and potential third decisive match hosted by the better placed team on 28 and 29 May respectively. The semi-finals and final were hosted by Bonner THV in Bonn, North Rhine-Westphalia on 4 and 5 June 2022.

=== Bracket ===
Quarter-finals
Mannheimer HC	1 (2)	7
Berliner HC	1 (1)	3
Hamburger Polo Club	1	5	1
Uhlenhorst Mülheim	2	2	0
Rot-Weiss Köln	2 (2)	3
UHC Hamburg	2 (1)	0
Harvestehuder THC	3	3 (0)	4
Club an der Alster	2	3 (2)	1

Semi-finals
4 June – Bonn
Mannheimer HC	0
Hamburger Polo Club	3
4 June – Bonn
Rot-Weiss Köln	3
Harvestehuder THC	1

Final
5 June – Bonn
Hamburger Polo Club	0
Rot-Weiss Köln	1
Third place
5 June – Bonn
Mannheimer HC	2
Harvestehuder THC	4

=== Quarter-finals ===
14 May 2022
14:00

Berliner HC	1–1	Mannheimer HC
Strüven 36'	Report	Zmyslony 34'
Penalties
Klink (penalty shoot-out missed); Lehmann-Richter (penalty shoot-out missed); Zwicker (penalty shoot-out scored); Gomoll (penalty shoot-out missed); Dösch (penalty shoot-out missed)	1–2	(penalty shoot-out scored) Müller; (penalty shoot-out scored) Hartkopf; (penalty shoot-out missed) Hinrichs; (penalty shoot-out missed) Weigand

Ernst-Reuter Platz, Berlin

28 May 2022
14:30

Mannheimer HC	7–3	Berliner HC
Peillat 6', 34', 48', 54', 58'; Schachner 41'; Held 59'	Report	Neßelhauf 30'; Klink 49'; Lehmann-Richter 57'

Mannheimer HC, Mannheim

Mannheimer HC won series 2–0.

14 May 2022
12:30

UHC Hamburg	2–2	Rot-Weiss Köln
Golden 24'; Graffitti 32'	Report	Rühr 24'; Adrians 55'
Penalties
Struthoff (penalty shoot-out scored); H. Schmid (penalty shoot-out missed); Kloss (penalty shoot-out missed); Golden (penalty shoot-out missed); P. Schmid (penalty shoot-out missed)	1–2	(penalty shoot-out missed) Rühr; (penalty shoot-out scored) Prinz; (penalty shoot-out scored) Mazkour; (penalty shoot-out missed) Große

UHC Hamburg, Hamburg

28 May 2022
12:00

Rot-Weiss Köln	3–0	UHC Hamburg
Rühr 12'; Van der Weerden 37'; Prinz 60'	Report

Stadion Rot-Weiss, Cologne

Rot-Weiss Köln won series 2–0.

14 May 2022
14:00

Club an der Alster	2–3	Harvestehuder THC
Schnepel 28'; Heldens 44'	Report	Spooner 32'; Ntuli 40'; Körper 51'

Club an der Alster, Hamburg

28 May 2022
14:00

Harvestehuder THC	3–3	Club an der Alster
Körper 7'; Pfandt 21'; Ntuli 44'	Report	Schmidt 33'; Walker 43'; Schnepel 54'
Penalties
	0–2

HTHC Voßberg, Hamburg

29 May 2022
12:30

Harvestehuder THC	4–1	Club an der Alster
Losonci 26'; Habif 27'; Ntuli 43', 54'	Report	Walker 13'

HTHC Voßberg, Hamburg

Harvestehuder THC won series 2–1.

15 May 2022
14:00

Uhlenhorst Mülheim	2–1	Hamburger Polo Club
Brock 10'; Von Schwerin 59'	Report	Thörnblom 33'

Uhlenhorst Mülheim, Mülheim

28 May 2022
14:30

Hamburger Polo Club	5–2	Uhlenhorst Mülheim
Inglis 10', 25'; Russell 22', 55'; Staib 50'	Report	Ludwig 33'; Mertgens 43'

Kunstrasenplatz Polo, Hamburg

29 May 2022
14:00

Hamburger Polo Club	1–0	Uhlenhorst Mülheim
Smith 41'	Report

Kunstrasenplatz Polo, Hamburg

Hamburger Polo Club won series 2–1.

=== Semi-finals ===
4 June 2022
11:45

Rot-Weiss Köln	3–1	Harvestehuder THC
Aichinger 46'; Mazkour 49'; Rühr 52'	Report	Körper 17'

Bonner THV, Bonn

4 June 2022
14:00

Mannheimer HC	0–3	Hamburger Polo Club
	Report	Staib 45'; Mink 47'; Smith 53'

Bonner THV, Bonn

=== Third place match ===
5 June 2022
11:30

Mannheimer HC	2–4	Harvestehuder THC
Hinrichs 42'; Hartkopf 45'	Report	Körper 9'; Ntuli 27', 47'; Keim 53'

Bonner THV, Bonn

=== Final ===
5 June 2022
13:45

Hamburger Polo Club	0–1	Rot-Weiss Köln
	Report	Adrians 54'

Bonner THV, Bonn
