= Jeremy Gucassoff =

Belgian field hockey player

Jeremy Gucassof
Personal information
- Born: 3 December 1988 (age 37)

Sport
- Sport: Field hockey
- Position: Goalkeeper
- Club: Racing
Youth career
- Years: Team
- 1993–2006: Racing
Senior career
Years	Team	Caps	Goals
2006–present	Racing	-	-
National team
Years	Team	Caps	Goals
2009–2017	Belgium	140	(0)
2018–2020	Belgium (indoor)	17	(0)
Medal record
Representing Belgium
Men's field hockey
EuroHockey Championship
Silver medal – second place	2013 Boom
Hockey World League
Silver medal – second place	2014–15 Raipur	Team
Men's indoor hockey
EuroHockey Indoor Championship
Silver medal – second place	2018 Antwerp

Jeremy Gucassoff is a Belgian field hockey player raised in Brussels who plays as a goalkeeper for Racing.

In 2011, he was elected Goalie of the Year by Hockey Belgium. Gucassoff became European vice-champion with Belgium Red Lions in 2013. He announced in February 2024, he would retire at the end of the 2023–24 season.
