= 2018 Men's EuroHockey Indoor Club Cup =

International indoor hockey competition

Tournament details
- Host country: Switzerland
- City: Wettingen
- Dates: 16–18 February
- Teams: 8 (from 8 associations)
- Venue: Tägi Sporthalle

Final positions
- Champions: (Germany) Rot-Weiss Köln (9th title)
- Runner-up: (Belgium) Racing Club de Bruxelles
- Third place: (Russia) Dinamo Elektrostal

Tournament statistics
- Matches played: 20
- Goals scored: 119 (5.95 per match)
- Top scorer: (Germany) Marco Miltkau (9 goals)
- Best player: (Germany) Marco Miltkau

The 2018 Men's EuroHockey Indoor Club Cup was the 29th edition of the Men's EuroHockey Indoor Club Cup, Europe's premier club indoor hockey tournament organized by the EHF. It was held from 16 to 18 February 2019 in Wettingen, Switzerland.

Rot-Weiss Köln won a record-extending ninth title by defeating Racing Club de Bruxelles 5–2 in the final, Dinamo Elektrostal took the bronze medal and Surbiton and Complutense were relegated to the Trophy division.

== Teams ==
Participating clubs have qualified based on their country's final ranking from the 2017 competition (Host is highlighted in bold).

Pool A	Pool B
(Germany) Rot-Weiss Köln	(Austria) Arminen
(England) Surbiton	(Netherlands) Amsterdam
(Russia) Dinamo Elektrostal	(Spain) Complutense
**(Switzerland) Rotweiss Wettingen**	(Belgium) Racing Bruxelles

== Results ==
All times are local, CET (UTC+1).

=== Preliminary round ===
==== Pool A ====
Pos	Team	Pld	W	D	L	GF	GA	GD	Pts	Qualification
1	(Russia) Dinamo Elektrostal	3	3	0	0	12	8	+4	**15**	Semi-finals
2	(Germany) Rot-Weiss Köln	3	2	0	1	13	9	+4	**11**	Semi-finals
3	(England) Surbiton	3	1	0	2	7	11	−4	**6**	Pool C
4	(Switzerland) Rotweiss Wettingen (H)	3	0	0	3	7	11	−4	**3**	Pool C

Source: EHF
(H) Hosts

16 February 2018
12:30

Surbiton (England)	4–2	(Switzerland) Rotweiss Wettingen
	Report

16 February 2018
13:45

Rot-Weiss Köln (Germany)	4–5	(Russia) Dinamo Elektrostal
	Report

16 February 2018
18:00

Dinamo Elektrostal (Russia)	3–2	(Switzerland) Rotweiss Wettingen
	Report

16 February 2018
19:15

Surbiton (England)	1–5	(Germany) Rot-Weiss Köln
	Report

17 February 2018
11:30

Dinamo Elektrostal (Russia)	4–2	(England) Surbiton
	Report

17 February 2018
12:45

Rot-Weiss Köln (Germany)	4–3	(Switzerland) Rotweiss Wettingen
	Report

==== Pool B ====
Pos	Team	Pld	W	D	L	GF	GA	GD	Pts	Qualification
1	(Netherlands) Amsterdam	3	3	0	0	18	5	+13	**15**	Semi-finals
2	(Belgium) Racing Club de Bruxelles	3	1	1	1	9	14	−5	**7**	Semi-finals
3	(Spain) Complutense	3	0	2	1	5	8	−3	**4**	Pool C
4	(Austria) Arminen	3	0	1	2	8	13	−5	**3**	Pool C

Source: EHF

16 February 2018
10:00

Arminen (Austria)	2–2	(Spain) Complutense
	Report

16 February 2018
11:15

Amsterdam (Netherlands)	8–2	(Belgium) Racing Club de Bruxelles
	Report

16 February 2018
15:30

Complutense (Spain)	3–3	(Belgium) Racing Club de Bruxelles
	Report

16 February 2018
16:45

Amsterdam (Netherlands)	7–3	(Austria) Arminen
	Report

17 February 2018
09:00

Arminen (Austria)	3–4	(Belgium) Racing Club de Bruxelles
	Report

17 February 2018
10:15

Complutense (Spain)	0–3	(Netherlands) Amsterdam
	Report

=== Fifth to eighth place classification ===
==== Pool C ====
The points obtained in the preliminary round against the other team are taken over.

Pos	Team	Pld	W	D	L	GF	GA	GD	Pts	Relegation
5	(Switzerland) Rotweiss Wettingen (H)	3	2	0	1	6	6	0	**11**	
6	(Austria) Arminen	3	1	1	1	7	5	+2	**8**	
7	(England) Surbiton (R)	3	1	1	1	6	7	−1	**7**	Relegation to the Trophy
8	(Spain) Complutense (R)	3	0	2	1	4	5	−1	**5**	Relegation to the Trophy

Source: EHF
(H) Hosts; (R) Relegated

17 February 2018
16:30

Rotweiss Wettingen (Switzerland)	2–1	(Austria) Arminen
	Report

17 February 2018
17:45

Surbiton (England)	1–1	(Spain) Complutense
	Report

18 February 2018
10:00

Complutense (Spain)	1–2	(Switzerland) Rotweiss Wettingen
	Report

18 February 2018
11:15

Surbiton (England)	1–4	(Austria) Arminen
	Report

=== First to fourth place classification ===
Semi-finals
17 February
(Russia) Dinamo Elektrostal	4 (2)
**(Belgium) Racing Bruxelles (p.s.o.)**	**4 (3)**
17 February
(Netherlands) Amsterdam	2
**(Germany) Rot-Weiss Köln**	**3**

Final
18 February
(Belgium) Racing Bruxelles	2
**(Germany) Rot-Weiss Köln**	**5**
Third place
18 February
**(Russia) Dinamo Elektrostal**	**4**
(Netherlands) Amsterdam	3

==== Semi-finals ====
17 February 2018
19:00

Dinamo Elektrostal (Russia)	4–4	(Belgium) Racing Club de Bruxelles
	Report
Penalties
	2–3

17 February 2018
20:15

Amsterdam (Netherlands)	2–3	(Germany) Rot-Weiss Köln
	Report

==== Third and fourth place ====
18 February 2018
13:00

Dinamo Elektrostal (Russia)	4–3	(Netherlands) Amsterdam
	Report

==== Final ====
18 February 2018
14:30

Racing Club de Bruxelles (Belgium)	2–5	(Germany) Rot-Weiss Köln
	Report

== Statistics ==
=== Final standings ===
Pos	Team	Relegation
1	(Germany) Rot-Weiss Köln	
2	(Belgium) Racing Club de Bruxelles	
3	(Russia) Dinamo Elektrostal	
4	(Netherlands) Amsterdam	
5	(Switzerland) Rotweiss Wettingen (H)	
6	(Austria) Arminen	
7	(England) Surbiton (R)	EuroHockey Club Trophy
8	(Spain) Complutense (R)	EuroHockey Club Trophy

Source: EHF
(H) Host; (R) Relegated

=== Top goalscorers ===
Rank	Player	Team	Goals
1	(Germany) Marco Miltkau	(Germany) Rot-Weiss Köln	9
2	(Belgium) Tom Boon	(Belgium) Racing Bruxelles	7
3	(Scotland) Alan Forsyth	(England) Surbiton	6
3	(Netherlands) Nicki Leijs	(Netherlands) Amsterdam	6
3	(Netherlands) Robert Tigges	(Netherlands) Amsterdam	6
6	(Poland) Dariusz Rachwalski	(Austria) Arminen	5
6	(Germany) Moritz Trompertz	(Germany) Rot-Weiss Köln	5
8	5 players		4

=== Awards ===
The following individual awards were given at the conclusion of the tournament.

U21 Player of the Tournament	Best Player	Best Goalkeeper	Leading Goalscorer
(Russia) Georgii Arusiia	(Germany) Marco Miltkau	(Netherlands) Philip van Leeuwen	(Germany) Marco Miltkau

== See also ==
- 2017–18 Euro Hockey League
