= Tanguy Cosyns =

Belgian field hockey player

Personal information
- Full name: Tanguy Gérald Cosyns
- Born: 29 June 1991 (age 35) Uccle, Belgium

Sport
- Sport: Field hockey
- Position: Forward
- Club: Racing
Youth career
- Years: Team
- –2009: Daring
Senior career
Years	Team	Caps	Goals
2007–2009	Daring	-	-
2009–2013	Waterloo Ducks	-	-
2013–2018	Daring	-	-
2018–2019	HGC	-	-
2019–2021	Amsterdam	-	-
2021–present	Racing	-	-
National team
Years	Team	Caps	Goals
2013–2024	Belgium	180	(80)
Medal record
Men's field hockey
Representing Belgium
Olympic Games
Silver medal – second place	2016 Rio de Janeiro	Team
World Cup
Silver medal – second place	2023 Bhubaneswar/Rourkela
Hockey World League
Silver medal – second place	2014–15 Raipur	Team
EuroHockey Junior Championship
Gold medal – first place	2012 's-Hertogenbosch

Tanguy Gérald Cosyns (born 29 June 1991) is a Belgian professional field hockey player who plays as a forward for Racing Club de Bruxelles and the Belgium national team. He played 180 matches for the Belgium national team from 2013 until 2024.

== Club career ==
Tanguy started hockey at 4 years old at Royal Daring. He made his debut in the senior team at 16 while winning the U18 national title in 2009. He then moved to the Waterloo Ducks with whom he won two national titles in 2012 and 2013. After this experience, he returned to the club from his beginnings and helped him to reach the Euro Hockey League Final Four in 2015.

In 2018, he took on a new challenge by joining the Dutch championship. He made his first season there with HGC (reaching 3rd place and the European ticket) before moving to Amsterdamsche H&BC this last season scoring 17 goals before the season was unfortunately shortened because of the COVID-19 crisis. After three seasons in the Netherlands, he returned to Belgium and joined Racing. He scored a hattrick in the second match of the 2021–22 championship final to win the national title with Racing.

== International career ==
After winning the U18 (2009) and U21 (2012) European titles, he joined the senior squad in 2013. His first selection in a competition was for the Men's FIH Hockey World League Round 2 hosted by Saint Germain HC. His first major event was the 2014 Men's Hockey World Cup in The Hague where he finished in 5th place, scoring 5 goals. He was part of the Belgian men's team that won the silver medal at 2016 Summer Olympics in Rio de Janeiro scoring 5 goals. In August 2024 he announced after the victory 4–1 in the 2023–24 FIH Pro League against Spain in Antwerp would be his last match with the national team.

== Personal/others ==
In 2017 he was sidelined due to an anterior cruciate ligament rupture. The surgery was operated by Professor Dr Johan Bellemans. He took advantage of this time spent off the field to think about the development of a hockey brand.

== Honours ==
=== Club ===
Waterloo Ducks

- Belgian Hockey League: 2011–12, 2012–13

Racing

- Belgian Hockey League: 2021–22

=== International ===
Belgium U21

- EuroHockey Junior Championship: 2012

Belgium

- Olympic silver medal: 2016
- FIH Pro League: 2020–21
