= Rhys Smith =

English field hockey player

Personal information
- Born: 13 March 1997 (age 29) England

Sport
- Sport: Field hockey
- Position: Midfielder
- Club: Hamburger Polo Club
Senior career
Years	Team	Caps	Goals
2013-2015	East Grinstead	-	-
2015-2018	Durham University	-	-
2018-2019	East Grinstead	-	-
2019–2023	Wimbledon	-	-
2023–	Hamburger Polo Club	-	-
National team
Years	Team	Caps	Goals
2015–17	England & GB U-21	23	-
2018–	England & GB	17	(0)
Medal record
Men's field hockey
Representing England
Commonwealth Games
Bronze medal – third place	2022 Birmingham	Team
- Updated on 15th April 2023

Rhys Smith (born 13 March 1997) is an English field hockey player who plays in midfield for German BUndesliga club Hamburger Polo Club and the England and

Great Britain national teams.

== Biography ==
He was educated at Whitgift School, South Croydon, London. He completed his higher education at Durham University.

Smith played club hockey in the Men's England Hockey League Premier Division for East Grinstead. While at East Grinstead, he made his senior international debuts in October 2018, for Great Britain v Belgium on 2 October 2018 and for England v France on 16 October 2018.

He transferred to Wimbledon and played there from 2019 until 2023. During this spell he won a bronze medal with England in the Men's tournament at the 2022 Commonwealth Games in Birmingham.

In 2023 he left England and started playing for Hamburger Polo Club in Germany.
