= 2014–15 Men's FIH Hockey World League Final =

Field hockey tournament

- Official Logo

Tournament details
- Host country: India
- City: Raipur
- Dates: 27 November–6 December
- Teams: 8
- Venue: Sardar Vallabhbhai Patel International Hockey Stadium

Final positions
- Champions: Australia (1st title)
- Runner-up: Belgium
- Third place: India

Tournament statistics
- Matches played: 22
- Goals scored: 100 (4.55 per match)
- Top scorer: (Argentina) Gonzalo Peillat (8 goals)
- Best player: (Australia) Jamie Dwyer
- Best goalkeeper: (Netherlands) Jaap Stockmann

The 2014–15 Men's FIH Hockey World League Final took place from 27 November to 6 December 2015 in Raipur, India. A total of 8 teams competed for the title.

Australia won the tournament for the first time after defeating Belgium 2–1 in the final match. Host nation India won the third place match by defeating the Netherlands 3–2 on a penalty shootout after a 5–5 draw.

== Qualification ==
The host nation qualified automatically in addition to 7 teams qualified from the Semifinals. The following eight teams, shown with final pre-tournament rankings, competed in this round of the tournament.

Dates	Event	Location	Quotas	Qualifier(s)
	Host nation		1	India (6)
3–14 June 2015	2014–15 FIH Hockey World League Semifinals	Buenos Aires, Argentina	7	Germany (3); Argentina (5); Netherlands (2); Canada (14)
20 June–5 July 2015	2014–15 FIH Hockey World League Semifinals	Antwerp, Belgium	7	Australia (1); Belgium (7); Great Britain (4)
Total			8	

== Umpires ==
Below are the 10 umpires appointed by the International Hockey Federation:

- Grant Hundley (USA)
- Adam Kearns (AUS)
- Germán Montes de Oca (ARG)
- Raghu Prasad (IND)
- Ayden Shrives (RSA)
- Gurinder Singh (IND)
- Nathan Stagno (GBR)
- David Sweetman (GBR)
- David Tomlinson (NZL)
- Paul Walker (GBR)

== Results ==
All times are Indian Standard Time (UTC+05:30)

=== First round ===
==== Pool A ====
Pos	Team	Pld	W	D	L	GF	GA	GD	Pts
1	Great Britain	3	2	1	0	11	6	+5	7
2	Australia	3	2	0	1	9	5	+4	6
3	Belgium	3	1	1	1	10	6	+4	4
4	Canada	3	0	0	3	3	16	−13	0

Source: FIH
Rules for classification: 1) points; 2) goal difference; 3) goals scored; 4) head-to-head result.

28 November 2015
14:30

Great Britain	3–1	Canada
Mantell 2', 23'; Catlin 24'	Report	Pearson 4'

Umpires:
Raghu Prasad (IND)
Adam Kearns (AUS)

28 November 2015
16:30

Australia	1–0	Belgium
Dwyer 22'	Report

Umpires:
David Tomlinson (NZL)
Nathan Stagno (GBR)

29 November 2015
18:30

Belgium	7–2	Canada
Dockier 9'; Van Aubel 12', 58'; Briels 13'; Truyens 14'; Van Doren 50'; Boon 54'	Report	Pearson 29'; Noronha 44'

Umpires:
Ayden Shrives (RSA)
David Sweetman (GBR)

29 November 2015
20:30

Australia	2–5	Great Britain
Hayward 17'; Gohdes 47'	Report	Weir 9'; Grassick 13'; Sloan 23'; Condon 32'; Roper 49'

Umpires:
Germán Montes de Oca (ARG)
Grant Hundley (USA)

1 December 2015
18:30

Australia	6–0	Canada
Beale 4', 60'; Hayward 11'; Wotherspoon 13'; Dawson 15'; Govers 57'	Report

Umpires:
Paul Walker (GBR)
David Sweetman (GBR)

1 December 2015
20:30

Great Britain	3–3	Belgium
Roper 7'; Brogdon 28'; Forsyth 40'	Report	Briels 13'; Cosyns 38'; Boon 42'

Umpires:
Adam Kearns (AUS)
Grant Hundley (USA)

==== Pool B ====
Pos	Team	Pld	W	D	L	GF	GA	GD	Pts
1	Netherlands	3	2	1	0	6	3	+3	7
2	Argentina	3	2	0	1	8	4	+4	6
3	Germany	3	0	2	1	2	4	−2	2
4	India	3	0	1	2	2	7	−5	1

Source: FIH
Rules for classification: 1) points; 2) goal difference; 3) goals scored; 4) head-to-head result.

27 November 2015
18:30

Argentina	3–0	India
Peillat 3', 60+'; Menini 24'	Report

Umpires:
Adam Kearns (AUS)
David Tomlinson (NZL)

27 November 2015
20:30

Germany	0–0	Netherlands
	Report

Umpires:
Raghu Prasad (IND)
Ayden Shrives (RSA)

28 November 2015
18:30

Germany	1–1	India
Wellen 6'	Report	A. Singh 47'

Umpires:
Germán Montes de Oca (ARG)
Paul Walker (GBR)

28 November 2015
20:30

Netherlands	3–2	Argentina
Brinkman 10'; Van Ass 17'; Bovendeert 22'	Report	Peillat 30', 39'

Umpires:
Grant Hundley (USA)
David Sweetman (GBR)

30 November 2015
18:30

Netherlands	3–1	India
Van der Weerden 36'; Pruijser 43'; Bovendeert 54'	Report	Kangujam 47'

Umpires:
David Tomlinson (NZL)
Ayden Shrives (RSA)

30 November 2015
20:30

Argentina	3–1	Germany
Peillat 17', 51'; Paredes 50'	Report	Wellen 26'

Umpires:
Raghu Prasad (IND)
Nathan Stagno (GBR)

=== Second round ===
Quarter-finals
3 December 2015
Great Britain	1
India	2
3 December 2015
Argentina	1
Belgium	2
2 December 2015
Australia	4
Germany	1
2 December 2015
Netherlands	2
Canada	0

Semi-finals
5 December 2015
India	0
Belgium	1
4 December 2015
Australia	3
Netherlands	2

Final
6 December 2015
Belgium	1
Australia	2
Third place
6 December 2015
India (p.s.o.)	5 (3)
Netherlands	5 (2)

==== Quarterfinals ====
2 December 2015
18:30

Netherlands	2–0	Canada
Jonker 25'; Bovendeert 56'	Report

Umpires:
Paul Walker (GBR)
Raghu Prasad (IND)

2 December 2015
20:45

Australia	4–1	Germany
Hayward 4'; Dwyer 5'; Dawson 27'; Turner 60'	Report	Rühr 40'

Umpires:
Nathan Stagno (GBR)
Germán Montes de Oca (ARG)

3 December 2015
18:30

Great Britain	1–2	India
Mantell 52'	Report	Raghunath 19'; T. Singh 39'

Umpires:
David Tomlinson (NZL)
Ayden Shrives (RSA)

3 December 2015
20:45

Argentina	1–2	Belgium
Mazilli 42'	Report	Hendrickx 22'; Dockier 27'

Umpires:
Paul Walker (GBR)
David Sweetman (GBR)

==== Fifth to eighth place classification ====
The losing quarterfinalists were ranked according to their first round results to determine the fixtures for the fifth to eighth place classification matches.

Pos	Team	Pld	W	D	L	GF	GA	GD	Pts
1	Great Britain	3	2	1	0	11	6	+5	7
2	Argentina	3	2	0	1	8	4	+4	6
3	Germany	3	0	2	1	2	4	−2	2
4	Canada	3	0	0	3	3	16	−13	0

Source: FIH
Rules for classification: 1) points; 2) goal difference; 3) goals scored.

===== Seventh and eighth place =====
5 December 2015
20:45

Germany	8–3	Canada
Rühr 3', 4'; Fürste 8'; Wellen 18'; Windfeder 24'; Fuchs 51'; Korn 54'; Staib 59'	Report	Johnston 30+'; Guest 41'; Tupper 49'

Umpires:
David Sweetman (GBR)
Raghu Prasad (IND)

===== Fifth and sixth place =====
4 December 2015
20:45

Great Britain	2–4	Argentina
Mantell 50'; Roper 57'	Report	Ibarra 5', 17'; Peillat 14', 54'

Umpires:
Ayden Shrives (RSA)
Grant Hundley (USA)

==== First to fourth place classification ====
===== Semifinals =====
4 December 2015
18:30

Australia	3–2	Netherlands
Wotherspoon 8'; Beale 22'; Gohdes 42'	Report	Jonker 29'; Pruijser 33'

Umpires:
Nathan Stagno (GBR)
David Tomlinson (NZL)

5 December 2015
18:30

India	0–1	Belgium
	Report	Charlier 5'

Umpires:
Adam Kearns (AUS)
Germán Montes de Oca (ARG)

===== Third and fourth place =====
6 December 2015
18:30

Netherlands	5–5	India
Pruijser 9'; Van der Schoot 25'; Van der Weerden 54', 58', 60+'	Report	Ra. Singh 39', 51'; Pal Singh 47', 55'; A. Singh 56'
Penalties
Bakker (penalty shoot-out scored); Hertzberger (penalty shoot-out missed); Pruijser (penalty shoot-out missed); Van Ass (penalty shoot-out scored); Verga (penalty shoot-out missed)	2–3	(penalty shoot-out missed) Mujtaba; (penalty shoot-out missed) Amir Khan; (penalty shoot-out scored) Lakra; (penalty shoot-out scored) S. Singh; (penalty shoot-out scored) Manpreet

Umpires:
Paul Walker (GBR)
Adam Kearns (AUS)

===== Final =====
6 December 2015
20:45

Australia	2–1	Belgium
Hayward 16'; Dawson 37'	Report	Gougnard 60+'

Umpires:
Nathan Stagno (GBR)
Germán Montes de Oca (ARG)

== Awards ==
Top Goalscorer	Player of the Tournament	Goalkeeper of the Tournament	Young Player of the Tournament
(Argentina) Gonzalo Peillat	(Australia) Jamie Dwyer	(Netherlands) Jaap Stockmann	(Belgium) Arthur van Doren

== Statistics ==
=== Final standings ===
1. Australia
2. Belgium
3. India
4. Netherlands
5. Argentina
6. Great Britain
7. Germany
8. Canada

=== Goalscorers ===
There were 100 goals scored in 22 matches, for an average of 4.55 goals per match.

8 goals

- (Argentina) Gonzalo Peillat

4 goals

- (Australia) Jeremy Hayward
- (United Kingdom) Simon Mantell
- (Netherlands) Mink van der Weerden

3 goals

- (Australia) Daniel Beale
- (Australia) Matthew Dawson
- (Germany) Christopher Rühr
- (Germany) Niklas Wellen
- (United Kingdom) Phil Roper
- (Netherlands) Roel Bovandeert
- (Netherlands) Mirco Pruijser

2 goals

- (Argentina) Pedro Ibarra
- (Australia) Matthew Gohdes
- (Australia) Jamie Dwyer
- (Australia) Dylan Wotherspoon
- (Belgium) Florent van Aubel
- (Belgium) Tom Boon
- (Belgium) Thomas Briels
- (Belgium) Sébastien Dockier
- (Canada) Mark Pearson
- (India) Akashdeep Singh
- (India) Ramandeep Singh
- (India) Rupinder Pal Singh
- (Netherlands) Constantijn Jonker

1 goal

- (Argentina) Agustín Mazzilli
- (Argentina) Joaquín Menini
- (Argentina) Matías Paredes
- (Australia) Kieran Govers
- (Australia) Glenn Turner
- (Belgium) Cédric Charlier
- (Belgium) Tanguy Cosyns
- (Belgium) Simon Gougnard
- (Belgium) Alexander Hendrickx
- (Belgium) Arthur van Doren
- (Belgium) Jérôme Truyens
- (Canada) Matthew Guest
- (Canada) Gordon Johnston
- (Canada) Devohn Noronha
- (Canada) Scott Tupper
- (Germany) Florian Fuchs
- (Germany) Moritz Fürste
- (Germany) Oliver Korn
- (Germany) Constantin Staib
- (Germany) Lukas Windfeder
- (United Kingdom) Alastair Brogdon
- (United Kingdom) Nicholas Catlin
- (United Kingdom) David Condon
- (United Kingdom) Alan Forsyth
- (United Kingdom) Chris Grassick
- (United Kingdom) Ian Sloan
- (United Kingdom) Henry Weir
- (India) V. R. Raghunath
- (India) Chinglensana Singh
- (India) Talwinder Singh
- (Netherlands) Seve van Ass
- (Netherlands) Thierry Brinkman
- (Netherlands) Niek van der Schoot

Source: FIH
