= 2016–17 Feldhockey-Bundesliga =

Bundesliga
- Season: 2016–17
- Dates: 17 September 2016 – 28 May 2017
- Champions: Mannheimer HC (1st title)
- Regular season: Rot-Weiss Köln
- Relegated: Klipper THC; TuS Lichterfelde
- Euro Hockey League: Mannheimer HC; Rot-Weiss Köln; Uhlenhorst Mülheim
- Matches: 132
- Goals: 767 (5.81 per match)
- Top goalscorer: Michael Körper (44 goals)
- Biggest home win: Rot-Weiss Köln 10–2 Nürnberger HTC; Rot-Weiss Köln 9–1 Lichterfelde
- Biggest away win: Klipper THC 1–8 Alster
- Highest scoring: Alster 6–8 Harvestehude

The 2016–17 Feldhockey-Bundesliga was the 75th season of the Men's Feldhockey Bundesliga, Germany's premier field hockey league. The season started on 17 September 2016 and ended on 28 May 2017 with the championship final.

Mannheimer HC won their first ever Bundesliga title by defeating the defending champions Rot-Weiss Köln 3–2 in the final.

== Teams ==
2016–17 Feldhockey-Bundesliga teams
Location of Hamburg teams

A total of 12 teams participated in this season of the Bundesliga. Klipper THC and TuS Lichterfelde were the promoted teams who replaced the relegated Blau-Weiss Berlin and Schwarz-Weiß Neuss.

Team	Location	State
Berliner HC	Berlin	Berlin
Club an der Alster	Hamburg	Hamburg
Crefelder HTC	Krefeld	North Rhine-Westphalia
Harvestehuder THC	Hamburg	Hamburg
Klipper THC	Hamburg	Hamburg
Mannheimer HC	Mannheim	Baden-Württemberg
Nürnberger HTC	Nuremberg	Bavaria
Rot-Weiss Köln	Cologne	North Rhine-Westphalia
TSV Mannheim	Mannheim	Baden-Württemberg
TuS Lichterfelde	Berlin	Berlin
UHC Hamburg	Hamburg	Hamburg
Uhlenhorst Mülheim	Mülheim	North Rhine-Westphalia

=== Number of teams by state ===
State	Number of teams	Clubs
Hamburg	4	Club an der Alster, Harvestehuder THC, Klipper THC and UHC Hamburg
North Rhine-Westphalia	3	Crefelder HTC, Rot-Weiss Köln and Uhlenhorst Mülheim
Baden-Württemberg	2	Mannheimer HC and TSV Mannheim
Berlin	2	Berliner HC, TuS Lichterfelde
Bavaria	1	Nürnberger HTC
Total	12	

== Regular season ==
=== Standings ===
Pos	Team	Pld	W	D	L	GF	GA	GD	Pts	Qualification or relegation
1	Rot-Weiss Köln	22	16	2	4	85	36	+49	50	Qualification for the Euro Hockey League and the play-offs
2	Uhlenhorst Mülheim	22	13	6	3	83	53	+30	45	Qualification for the Euro Hockey League and the play-offs
3	Mannheimer HC (C)	22	12	6	4	78	44	+34	42	Qualification for the Euro Hockey League and the play-offs
4	Harvestehuder THC	22	12	4	6	96	64	+32	40	Qualification for the play-offs
5	UHC Hamburg	22	11	4	7	71	63	+8	37	
6	Crefelder HTC	22	10	6	6	61	47	+14	36	
7	TSV Mannheim	22	9	5	8	67	61	+6	32	
8	Berliner HC	22	8	6	8	55	56	−1	30	
9	Club an der Alster	22	8	3	11	63	65	−2	27	
10	Nürnberger HTC	22	6	5	11	52	69	−17	23	
11	Klipper THC (R)	22	1	2	19	26	107	−81	5	Relegation to the 2. Bundesliga
12	TuS Lichterfelde (R)	22	1	1	20	30	102	−72	4	Relegation to the 2. Bundesliga

Source: hockey.de
(C) Champions; (R) Relegated

=== Results ===
Home \ Away	BHC	ALS	CRE	HAR	KLI	MHC	NÜR	RWK	TSV	LIC	UHC	UHL
Berliner HC	—	3–2	2–1	3–3	5–1	1–5	3–4	1–3	2–1	5–0	2–7	1–1
Club an der Alster	3–1	—	4–1	6–8	3–3	2–2	6–3	1–3	0–2	8–1	1–2	4–2
Crefelder HTC	1–3	3–1	—	3–3	4–1	4–2	1–1	2–2	4–0	6–2	4–3	2–2
Harvestehuder THC	3–2	1–3	6–3	—	7–1	4–3	7–1	3–2	5–0	7–2	0–3	3–5
Klipper THC	1–5	1–8	0–5	2–8	—	1–6	3–9	0–3	1–4	2–1	0–3	1–5
Mannheimer HC	2–2	4–0	2–0	4–3	5–0	—	4–1	2–5	4–3	4–1	7–0	4–4
Nürnberger HTC	1–1	3–3	1–1	2–3	2–2	3–4	—	4–3	1–2	4–1	1–0	1–3
Rot-Weiss Köln	4–0	5–0	2–1	5–3	6–0	1–0	10–2	—	2–5	9–1	3–0	5–2
TSV Mannheim	3–3	8–2	3–5	3–3	3–1	3–3	3–1	1–4	—	3–3	5–3	3–5
TuS Lichterfelde	1–2	0–4	1–3	1–7	3–1	2–7	1–3	1–2	2–6	—	1–5	1–5
UHC Hamburg	5–4	3–2	2–3	4–4	8–2	3–3	3–2	5–5	4–4	3–2	—	4–3
Uhlenhorst Mülheim	4–4	6–0	4–4	6–5	4–2	1–1	5–2	2–1	3–2	6–2	5–1	—

Source: hockey.de
Legend: Blue = home team win; Yellow = draw; Red = away team win.

=== Top goalscorers ===
Rank	Player	Club	Goals
1	(Austria) Michael Körper	Harvestehuder THC	44
2	(Argentina) Gonzalo Peillat	Mannheimer HC	35
3	(Germany) Moritz Fürste	UHC Hamburg	30
4	(Germany) Philip Schlageter	TSV Mannheim	21
5	(Germany) Tom Grambusch	Rot-Weiss Köln	20
6	(Germany) Martin Häner	Berliner HC	16
6	(Germany) Lukas Windfeder	Uhlenhorst Mülheim	16
8	(Germany) Timm Herzbruch	Uhlenhorst Mülheim	15
8	(Germany) Thilo Stralkowski	Uhlenhorst Mülheim	15
10	(Germany) Anton Ebeling	Berliner HC	14

== Play-offs ==
=== Bracket ===
Semi-finals
27 May – Mannheim
Rot-Weiss Köln	4
Harvestehuder THC	3
27 May – Mannheim
Uhlenhorst Mülheim	1 (2)
Mannheimer HC (s.o.)	1 (3)

Final
28 May – Mannheim
Rot-Weiss Köln	2
Mannheimer HC	3

=== Semi-finals ===
27 May 2017
15:00

Uhlenhorst Mülheim	1–1	Mannheimer HC
Windfeder 25'	Report	Haase 49'
Penalties
Fürk (penalty shoot-out scored); Stralkowski (penalty shoot-out scored); Herzbruch (penalty shoot-out missed); Pereira (penalty shoot-out missed); Windfeder (penalty shoot-out missed)	2–3	(penalty shoot-out scored) Fischer; (penalty shoot-out missed) Müller; (penalty shoot-out scored) Barreiros; (penalty shoot-out missed) Hinrichs; (penalty shoot-out scored) Zmyslony

Mannheimer HC, Mannheim

27 May 2017
17:30

Rot-Weiss Köln	4–3	Harvestehuder THC
Rühr 6'; Miltkau 7'; M. Grambusch 18'; T. Grambusch 66'	Report	Spooner 33'; Pöhling 46'; Heuer 51'

Mannheimer HC, Mannheim

=== Final ===
28 May 2017
14:00

Rot-Weiss Köln	2–3	Mannheimer HC
Rühr 24'; T. Grambusch 66'	Report	Procházka 31'; Müller 32'; Haase 37'

Mannheimer HC, Mannheim
