= Cédric Charlier =

Belgian field hockey player

Personal information
- Full name: Cédric Daniel André Charlier
- Born: 27 November 1987 (age 38) Anderlecht, Belgium
- Height: 1.81 m (5 ft 11 in)
- Weight: 81 kg (179 lb)

Sport
- Sport: Field hockey
- Position: Forward
- Club: Racing
Youth career
- Team
- –: Uccle Sport
Senior career
Years	Team	Caps	Goals
2009–2019	Racing	-	-
2019–2021	Dragons	-	-
2021–present	Racing	-	-
National team
Years	Team	Caps	Goals
2008–2024	Belgium	381	(116)
Medal record
Men's field hockey
Representing Belgium
Olympic Games
Gold medal – first place	2020 Tokyo	Team
Silver medal – second place	2016 Rio de Janeiro	Team
World Cup
Gold medal – first place	2018 Bhubaneswar
Silver medal – second place	2023 Bhubaneswar/Rourkela
EuroHockey Championship
Gold medal – first place	2019 Antwerp
Silver medal – second place	2013 Boom
Silver medal – second place	2017 Amstelveen
Bronze medal – third place	2021 Amstelveen
Bronze medal – third place	2023 Mönchengladbach
Hockey World League
Silver medal – second place	2014–15 Raipur	Team

Cédric Daniel André Charlier (born 27 November 1987) is a Belgian professional field hockey player who plays as a forward for Racing Club de Bruxelles and the Belgian national team. He played 381 matches for the Belgium national team from 2008 until 2024.

== Club career ==
Charlier started playing hockey at Uccle and played there until he was 19 years old, when he went to Racing Bruxelles. In July 2019, he made a transfer to Dragons. After he won the Belgian national title with Dragons in the 2020–21 season he returned to Racing. In his first season back at Racing he won the league title again.

== International career ==
At the 2008, 2012 and 2016 Summer Olympics, he competed for the national team in the men's tournament. At the 2016 Olympics, he was part of the Belgian men's team that won the silver medal. Charlier also won silver with Belgium at the 2013 EuroHockey Championship on home ground in Boom and at the 2017 EuroHockey Championships in Amstelveen. In 2019, he finally won a gold medal at the European championships. On 25 May 2021, he was selected in the squad for the 2021 EuroHockey Championship. In August 2024 he announced after the quarterfinal loss in the 2024 Summer Olympics against Spain would be his last match with the national team.

== Honours ==
=== International ===
Belgium

- Olympic gold medal: 2020
- Olympic silver medal: 2016
- World Cup: 2018
- EuroHockey Championship: 2019
- FIH Pro League: 2020–21

=== Club ===
Dragons

- Belgian Hockey League: 2020–21

Racing

- Belgian Hockey League: 2021–22
