= 2023 Men's EuroHockey Club Trophy I =

Tournament details
- Host country: Austria
- City: Vienna
- Dates: 7–10 April
- Teams: 8 (from 7 associations)
- Venue: Post SV Wien

Final positions
- Champions: (Wales) Cardiff & Met (3rd title)
- Runner-up: (Ukraine) OKS Vinnitsa
- Third place: (Scotland) Grange

Tournament statistics
- Matches played: 16
- Goals scored: 90 (5.63 per match)
- Top scorer: (Wales) Jack Pritchard (7 goals)
- Best player: (Wales) Luke Hawker
- Best goalkeeper: (Ukraine) Bohdan Tovstolytkin

The 2023 Men's EuroHockey Club Trophy I is the 46th edition of Europe's secondary men's club field hockey tournament organized by the European Hockey Federation and the third edition since it was renamed from the EuroHockey Club Trophy to the Men's EuroHockey Club Trophy I.

The tournament was hosted by Post SV Wien in Vienna, Austria from 7 to 10 April 2023.

Cardiff & Met won their third title on the second European level after beating OKS Vinnitsa 4–2 in the final. It was their second European title in a row after their victory in the Men's EuroHockey Club Trophy II last season.

== Preliminary round ==
=== Pool A ===
Pos	Team	Pld	W	D	L	GF	GA	GD	Pts	Qualification
1	(Wales) Cardiff & Met	3	2	1	0	13	4	+9	12	Final
2	(Scotland) Grange	3	2	0	1	6	4	+2	11	Third place game
3	(Austria) Post SV (H)	3	1	1	1	13	6	+7	8	Fifth place game
4	(Ukraine) Phoenix	3	0	0	3	1	19	−18	0	Seventh place game

Source: EHF
Rules for classification: 1) points; 2) matches won; 3) goal difference; 4) goals for; 5) head-to-head result; 6) field goals for.
(H) Hosts

7 April 2023
15:00

Cardiff & Met (Wales)	8–1	(Ukraine) Phoenix
	Report

7 April 2023
17:15

Post SV (Austria)	2–3	(Scotland) Grange
	Report

8 April 2023
14:30

Cardiff & Met (Wales)	3–3	(Austria) Post SV
	Report

8 April 2023
16:45

Grange (Scotland)	3–0	(Ukraine) Phoenix
	Report

9 April 2023
14:30

Post SV (Austria)	8–0	(Ukraine) Phoenix
	Report

9 April 2023
16:45

Grange (Scotland)	0–2	(Wales) Cardiff & Met
	Report

=== Pool B ===
Pos	Team	Pld	W	D	L	GF	GA	GD	Pts	Qualification
1	(Ukraine) OKS Vinnitsa	3	2	1	0	10	3	+7	12	Final
2	(Switzerland) Grasshoppers	3	2	1	0	9	2	+7	12	Third place game
3	(Portugal) Casa Pia	3	0	1	2	3	8	−5	3	Fifth place game
4	(Denmark) Slagelse	3	0	1	2	4	13	−9	2	Seventh place game

Source: EHF
Rules for classification: 1) points; 2) matches won; 3) goal difference; 4) goals for; 5) head-to-head result; 6) field goals for.

7 April 2023
10:30

Casa Pia (Portugal)	0–2	(Switzerland) Grasshoppers
	Report

7 April 2023
12:45

OKS Vinnitsa (Ukraine)	5–1	(Denmark) Slagelse
	Report

8 April 2023
10:00

Grasshoppers (Switzerland)	5–0	(Denmark) Slagelse
	Report

8 April 2023
12:15

OKS Vinnitsa (Ukraine)	3–0	(Portugal) Casa Pia
	Report

9 April 2023
10:00

Casa Pia (Portugal)	3–3	(Denmark) Slagelse
	Report

9 April 2023
12:15

Grasshoppers (Switzerland)	2–2	(Ukraine) OKS Vinnitsa
	Report

== Classification round ==
=== Seventh and eighth place ===
10 April 2023
09:30

Phoenix (Ukraine)	6–4	(Denmark) Slagelse
	Report

=== Fifth and sixth place ===
10 April 2023
11:45

Post SV (Austria)	5–1	(Portugal) Casa Pia
	Report

=== Third and fourth place ===
10 April 2023
14:00

Grange (Scotland)	5–4	(Switzerland) Grasshoppers
	Report

=== Final ===
10 April 2023
16:15

Cardiff & Met (Wales)	4–2	(Ukraine) OKS Vinnitsa
	Report

== Final standings ==
1. (Wales) Cardiff & Met
2. (Ukraine) OKS Vinnitsa
3. (Scotland) Grange
4. (Switzerland) Grasshoppers
5. (Austria) Post SV
6. (Portugal) Casa Pia
7. (Ukraine) Phoenix
8. (Denmark) Slagelse

== See also ==
- 2022–23 Men's Euro Hockey League
- 2023 Women's EuroHockey Club Trophy
