= 2021–22 División de Honor de Hockey Hierba =

División de Honor
- Season: 2021–22
- Dates: 18 September 2021 – 8 May 2022
- Champions: Atlètic Terrassa (22nd title)
- Euro Hockey League: Atlètic Terrassa; Club Egara; Real Club de Polo
- Matches played: 90
- Goals scored: 394 (4.38 per match)
- Top goalscorer: Marc Miralles (17 goals)
- Biggest home win: Club Egara 6–0 Jolaseta
- Biggest away win: Jolaseta 0–5 Club de Campo; Tenis 0–5 Club de Campo
- Highest scoring: Atlètic Terrassa 6–4 Club Egara

The 2021–22 División de Honor de Hockey Hierba was the 56th season of the División de Honor de Hockey Hierba, the premier men's field hockey league in Spain. The season began on 8 May 2022 and finished with the championship final on 8 May 2022.

Club de Campo were the defending champions. Atlètic Terrassa won their 22nd title by defeating Real Club de Polo in the final 6–5 in a shoot-out after the match finished 2–2.

== Changes from 2020–21 ==
For this season the league returned to ten teams after last season was played with 12. For the 2022–23 season the league will again have 12 teams so no teams will be relegated directly this season, the 10th placed team only has to play a relegation play-off.

== Teams ==
Location of teams in the 2021–22 División de Honor
Location of Province of Barcelona teams in the 2021–22 División de Honor

Sardinero won the División de Honor Masculina B and were promoted while CD Terrassa, Giner de los Ríos and Linia 22 were relegated.

Team	Location	Autonomous Community	Stadium
Atlètic Terrassa	Terrassa	Catalonia	Estadi de Hockey Josep Marquès
Barcelona	Barcelona	Catalonia	Pau Negre Stadium
Club de Campo	Madrid	Madrid	Club de Campo
Club Egara	Terrassa	Catalonia	Pla de Bon Aire
Complutense	Madrid	Madrid	San Sebastián de los Reyes
Jolaseta	Getxo	Basque Country	R.C. Jolaseta
Junior	Sant Cugat del Vallès	Catalonia	Sant Cugat
Real Club de Polo	Barcelona	Catalonia	Eduardo Dualde
Sardinero	Santander	Cantabria	La Albericia
Tenis	Santander	Cantabria	La Albericia

=== Number of teams by autonomous community ===
Autonomous Community	Number of teams	Teams
Catalonia	5	Atlètic Terrassa, Barcelona, Club Egara, Junior and Real Club de Polo
Cantabria	2	Sardinero and Tenis
Madrid	2	Club de Campo and Complutense
Basque Country	1	Jolaseta
Total	10	

== Regular season ==
=== Standings ===
Pos	Team	Pld	W	D	L	GF	GA	GD	Pts	Qualification or relegation
1	Real Club de Polo	18	13	4	1	46	21	+25	43	Qualification for the Euro Hockey League and the Final 4
2	Atlètic Terrassa (C)	18	13	2	3	61	35	+26	41	Qualification for the Euro Hockey League and the Final 4
3	Club Egara	18	10	4	4	48	35	+13	34	Qualification for the Euro Hockey League and the Final 4
4	Club de Campo	18	11	0	7	51	26	+25	33	Qualification for the Final 4
5	Barcelona	18	8	4	6	40	37	+3	28	
6	Junior	18	8	2	8	41	40	+1	26	
7	Complutense	18	4	5	9	30	45	−15	17	
8	Tenis	18	3	6	9	25	42	−17	15	
9	Jolaseta	18	1	5	12	26	56	−30	8	
10	Sardinero (O)	18	1	4	13	26	57	−31	7	Qualification for the play-outs

Source: RFEH
(C) Champions; (O) Play-off winners

=== Results ===
Home \ Away	ATL	BAR	CDC	EGA	COM	JOL	JNR	RCP	SAR	TEN
Atlètic Terrassa	—	4–2	3–1	6–4	5–1	2–1	4–2	2–2	7–2	3–0
Barcelona	3–4	—	2–1	3–0	3–2	2–1	3–2	1–1	2–2	3–1
Club de Campo	2–3	4–1	—	2–0	3–0	6–1	2–4	1–2	4–0	5–1
Club Egara	3–2	5–2	3–1	—	2–2	6–0	3–3	1–2	2–1	4–3
Complutense	4–4	3–2	0–1	0–3	—	3–2	0–1	3–3	4–1	0–1
Jolaseta	2–3	2–2	0–5	2–2	3–3	—	3–4	0–2	2–2	2–1
Junior	0–2	2–3	0–3	2–4	5–0	2–0	—	4–1	1–0	1–3
Real Club de Polo	2–1	1–0	2–0	1–1	3–1	5–0	6–2	—	3–1	3–0
Sardinero	1–5	0–4	4–5	2–3	2–3	2–1	2–5	2–4	—	1–1
Tenis	3–1	2–2	0–5	1–2	1–1	4–4	1–1	1–3	1–1	—

Source: RFEH
Legend: Blue = home team win; Yellow = draw; Red = away team win.

== Final 4 ==
The Final 4 was hosted by Club de Campo in Madrid on 7 and 8 May 2022.

=== Bracket ===
Semi-finals
7 May – Madrid
Real Club de Polo (s.o.)	3 (4)
Club de Campo	3 (3)
7 May – Madrid
Atlètic Terrassa	3
Club Egara	2

Final
8 May – Madrid
Real Club de Polo	2 (5)
Atlètic Terrassa (s.o.)	2 (6)

=== Semi-finals ===
7 May 2022
15:00

Real Club de Polo	3–3	Club de Campo
Ruiz 15'; Piera 27'; Tarazona 34'	Report	Basterra 37'; Abajo 45', 47'
Penalties
	4–3

Club de Campo Villa de Madrid, Madrid
Umpires:
Sandra Adell
Daniel Rodriguez

7 May 2022
17:00

Atlètic Terrassa	3–2	Club Egara
Salles 7'; Ibañez 22'; Bonastre 40'	Report	Aguilar 6'; Broto 40'

Club de Campo Villa de Madrid, Madrid
Umpires:
Ketevan Gorgadze
Eduardo Garcia

=== Final ===
8 May 2022
15:00

Real Club de Polo	2–2	Atlètic Terrassa
Borras 61'; Miralles 68'	Report	Cunill 2', 43'
Penalties
	5–6

Club de Campo Villa de Madrid, Madrid
Umpires:
Gema Calderon
Diego Estebanez

== Play-outs ==
The play-outs were played on 29 May and 4 June 2022.

=== Overview ===
Team 1	Series	Team 2	Game 1	Game 2	Game 3
Benalmádena	0–2	Sardinero	2–2 (1–4 s.o.)	2–5	

=== Matches ===
29 May 2022
12:30

Sardinero	2–2	Benalmádena
De Santa 17'; Pozuelo 51'	Report	Dekeyser 33', 69'
Penalties
	4–1

La Albericia, Santander
Umpires:
Eduardo Garcia
Diego Estebanez

4 June 2022
12:00

Benalmádena	2–5	Sardinero
Dekeyser 39', 42'	Report	Burgos 11'; Rubio 23'; Coria 45', 66'; Munafo 67'

La Estupa, Benalmádena
Umpires:
Eduardo Garcia
Rayco Mena

Sardinero won series 2–0 and both teams remain in their respective division.
