= Hamburger Polo Club =

German sports club

- Sports: Polo, field hockey, tennis
- Founded: January 3, 1898; 128 years ago
- League: Men's Bundesliga
- Based in: Hamburg, Germany
- Colors: red, green
- 2021–22: Men: 2nd
- Website: Club website

The Hamburger Polo Club is a sports club in Hamburg, Germany, founded in 1898. The club participates in polo, field hockey, and tennis. The club's men's field hockey team is a member of Feldhockey Bundesliga, the top level professional men's field hockey league in Germany.

In their third season in the Bundesliga in 2021–22 the men's team reached the final of the championship for the first time. They lost the final 1–0 to Rot-Weiss Köln. The result also meant they qualified for the Euro Hockey League for the first time.

== Current squads ==
=== Men's field hockey squad ===
As of 2024–25

No.	Pos.	Nation	Player
2	MF	AUS	Tom Craig
3	DF	AUT	Oliver Binder
4	DF	GER	Mathias Müller (Captain)
5	MF	NZL	Sean Findlay
6	DF	NZL	Kane Russell
7	FW	GER	Paul Smith
8	MF	GER	Paul-Philipp Kaufmann
9	DF	AUT	Benjamin Kölbl
10	FW	AUS	Tim Brand
11	FW	GER	Constantin Staib
12	MF	NZL	Aidan Sarikaya
13	MF	NZL	Nic Woods
16	MF	GER	Luca Müller
17	FW	GER	Jan-Hendrik Bartels

No.	Pos.	Nation	Player
18	FW	GER	Lasse Mink
20	DF	GER	Niklas Bosserhoff
22	MF	ENG	Rhys Smith
23	MF	GER	Simón Quinders
24	MF	AUT	Leon Thörnblom
25	DF	GER	Björn Szerdahelyi
29	FW	NZL	Hugo Inglis
30	GK	GER	Niklas Garst
32	FW	NZL	George Baker
37	DF	GER	Lukas Kossel
34	GK	GER	Jannik Wolgast
50	DF	GER	Tom Demmel
69	GK	GER	Jasper Milt
