= Kane Russell =

New Zealand field hockey player

Personal information
- Full name: Kane Elliot Mark Russell
- Born: 22 April 1992 (age 34) Dunedin, New Zealand
- Height: 1.76 m (5 ft 9 in)
- Weight: 82 kg (181 lb)

Sport
- Sport: Field hockey
- Position: Defender
- Club: Hamburger Polo Club
Senior career
Years	Team	Caps	Goals
–2015	Southern Dogs	-	-
2016–2017	Antwerp	-	-
2017–2019	Léopold	-	-
2019–2020	Rotterdam	-	-
2020–present	Hamburger Polo Club	-	-
National team
Years	Team	Caps	Goals
2012–present	New Zealand	167	(71)
Medal record
Men's field hockey
Representing New Zealand
Oceania Cup
Silver medal – second place	2015 Stratford
Silver medal – second place	2019 Rockhampton
Silver medal – second place	2023 Whangārei
Commonwealth Games
Silver medal – second place	2018 Gold Coast	Team
Hockey World League
Silver medal – second place	2012–13 New Delhi	Team

Kane Elliot Mark Russell (born 22 April 1992) is a New Zealand field hockey player who plays as a defender for German club Hamburger Polo Club and the New Zealand national team.

Russell represented his country at the 2016 Summer Olympics in Rio de Janeiro, where the men's team came seventh.

== Club career ==
Russell plays as a defender for the Southern region in the New Zealand Hockey League. In 2016 he joined Royal Antwerp in Belgium. After one season with Antwerp he left them for Léopold. In the 2018–19 season he won the Belgian national title with Léopold. After he won the national title, he left Léopold and joined Rotterdam in the Netherlands. In April 2020, it was announced he left Rotterdam together with Blair Tarrant for Hamburger Polo Club in Germany for the 2020–21 season.

== Personal life ==
Russell was born in Dunedin in 1992. Of Māori descent, Russell affiliates to the Ngāpuhi iwi.
