= Royal Racing Club Bruxelles =

Belgian sports club, based in Uccle, Brussels

Racing
- Full name: Royal Racing Club de Bruxelles
- League: Men's Hockey League; Women's Hockey League
- Founded: 1891; 135 years ago
- Home ground: Stade du Vivier d'Oie, Uccle

Personnel
- Chairman: Thierry Le Saux
- Website: Club website
| Home | Away |

Royal Racing Club de Bruxelles is a professional Belgian sports club based in Uccle, Brussels. The club is most well known for its field hockey section with both the first men's and women's teams playing in the Belgian Hockey League.

The first men's team won their sixth league title during the 2021–22 season which was also their first title in 81 years.

== Honours ==
=== Men ===
- Belgian Hockey League
  - Winners (6): 1923–24, 1932–33, 1934–35, 1935–36, 1940–41, 2021–22
- EuroHockey Indoor Club Cup
  - Runners-up (2): 2013, 2018
- EuroHockey Indoor Club Trophy
  - Winners (1): 2017
  - Runners-up (1): 2012
- EuroHockey Indoor Club Challenge I
  - Winners (2): 2009, 2011

=== Women ===
- Belgian Hockey League
  - Winners (6): 1923–24, 1924–25, 1926–27, 1932–33, 1947–48, 1948–49

== Current squad ==
=== Men's squad ===
As of 2021–22

| No. | Pos. | Nation | Player |
|---|---|---|---|
| 1 | GK | BEL | Jeremy Gucassoff |
| 2 | DF | BEL | Loïc Vanwetter |
| 3 | DF | BEL | Romain Delavignette |
| 5 | DF | BEL | Arthur Delhalle |
| 7 | FW | BEL | Samuel Malherbe |
| 10 | FW | BEL | Cédric Charlier |
| 11 | MF | BEL | Jérôme Truyens |
| 13 | FW | BEL | Alexis Cayphas |
| 14 | MF | BEL | Augustin Meurmans |
| 15 | MF | BEL | Mathieu Weyers |

| No. | Pos. | Nation | Player |
|---|---|---|---|
| 17 | FW | BEL | Oscar Berton |
| 19 | DF | BEL | Hippolyte Delavignette |
| 21 | MF | BEL | Diego Lucaccioni |
| 22 | FW | BEL | Achille De Chaffoy |
| 26 | FW | BEL | Victor Wegnez |
| 28 | MF | BEL | Harald Marquet |
| 32 | FW | BEL | Tanguy Cosyns |
| — | GK | BEL | Martin Elias |
| — | MF | BEL | Martin Lambeau |
| — | FW | FRA | Gaspard Xavier |

=== Women's squad ===
Head coach Xavi Arnau (Spain)
Assistant coach Olivier Coulon (Belgium)
Video Analyst Nicolas Roche (France)
Physical Trainer Bertrand Dujardin (Belgium)
Manager Sybille Watteeus (Belgium)

As of September 2022

| No. | Pos. | Nation | Player |
|---|---|---|---|
| 1 | GK | BEL | Marie Grimard |
| 2 | GK | BEL | Felicia De Changy |
| 3 | MF | BEL | Justine Rasir |
| 6 | MF | BEL | Charlotte Englebert |
| 7 | MF | FRA | Pauline Varoqui |
| 8 | DF | BEL | Emma Puvrez |
| 14 | FW | BEL | Juliette Willems |
| 15 | FW | BEL | Eva Goffinet |

| No. | Pos. | Nation | Player |
|---|---|---|---|
| 18 | | BEL | Amber Sistermans |
| 20 | MF | BEL | France De Mot |
| 22 | DF | BEL | Agathe Willems |
| 22 | DF | BEL | Juliette Duquesne |
| 25 | DF | BEL | June Francois |
| 27 | FW | BEL | Jill Boon |
| — | FW | AUT | Daria Buchta |
| — | DF | FRA | Alice Lesgourgues |
| — | MF | FRA | Emma Ponthieu |
