= Tom Boon =

Belgian field hockey player (born 1990)

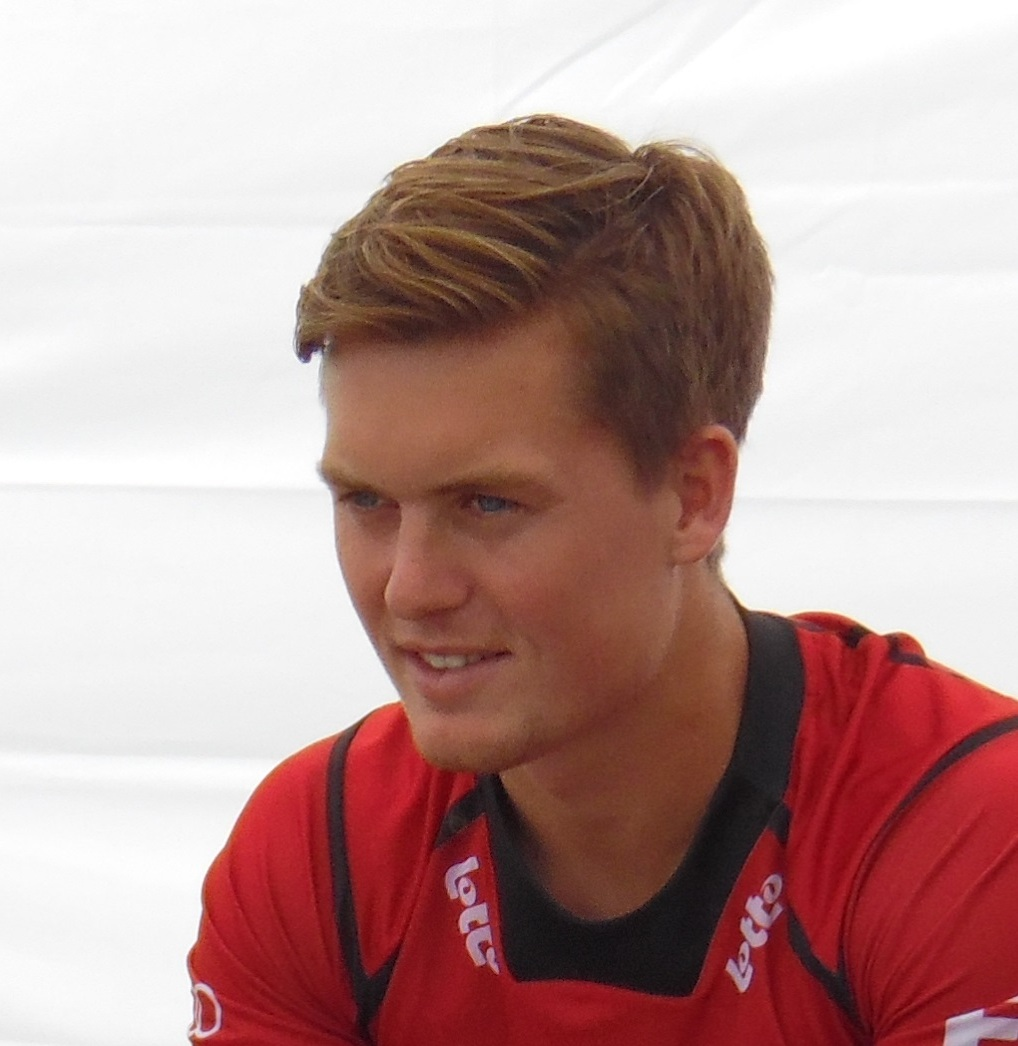
- Boon in 2016

Personal information
- Full name: Tom Alain Boon
- Born: 25 January 1990 (age 36) Brussels, Belgium
- Height: 1.84 m (6 ft 0 in)
- Weight: 81 kg (179 lb)

Sport
- Sport: Field hockey
- Position: Forward
- Club: Léopold
Youth career
- Team
- –: White Star
Senior career
Years	Team	Caps	Goals
–	White Star	-	-
–2013	Racing	-	-
2013–2015	Bloemendaal	-	-
2015–2019	Racing	-	-
2019–2025	Léopold	-	-
2025–2026	Ranchi Royals	-	-
National team
Years	Team	Caps	Goals
2008–present	Belgium	354	(294)
Medal record
Men's field hockey
Representing Belgium
Olympic Games
Gold medal – first place	2020 Tokyo	Team
Silver medal – second place	2016 Rio de Janeiro	Team
World Cup
Gold medal – first place	2018 Bhubaneswar
Silver medal – second place	2023 Bhubaneswar/Rourkela
EuroHockey Championship
Gold medal – first place	2019 Antwerp
Silver medal – second place	2013 Boom
Silver medal – second place	2017 Amstelveen
Bronze medal – third place	2021 Amstelveen
Hockey World League
Silver medal – second place	2014–15 Raipur	Team

Tom Alain Boon (born 25 January 1990) is a Belgian professional field hockey player who plays as a forward for the Belgium national team. He is regarded as one of the greatest field hockey players in the world.

He won a silver medal at the 2016 Olympics.

== Club career ==
He started at Royal White Star HC, and after also having played for Bloemendaal, he played four years for the Belgian team Racing Club de Bruxelles. In 2019, he moved to the 2018–19 Belgian national champions, Léopold, where he signed a contract for five seasons.

== International career ==
Boon made his debut in the national team in 2008. In 2009 he finished fifth with this team at the European Championship in Amstelveen and in 2011 they finished fourth at the European Championship in Mönchengladbach. In 2011, he also won the Champions Challenge. With his club Racing Brussels, he became Belgian field hockey champion for five consecutive years (2009–2013). At the 2012 Summer Olympics, he competed for the national team in the men's tournament that came fifth. Boon became European silver medalist with Belgium at the 2013 European Championship on home ground in Boom. In spite of his opening goal against Germany, Belgium lost the final by 1–3.

At the 2016 Olympics, he was part of the Belgium team that on the silver medal. Boon himself scored a goal in the quarter-final. At the 2019 EuroHockey Championship, where Belgium won its first European title, he was the top goalscorer together with three other players with five goals. On 25 May 2021, he was selected in the squad for the 2021 EuroHockey Championship.

== Personal life ==
Boon was born in a hockey family. His grandmother Jacqueline Ronsmans was a Belgian international player, just like his mother Carine Boon-Coudron and his uncles Eric and Marc Coudron (Belgian record international with 358 games). His sister Jill Boon has also played Olympic hockey for Belgium.

== International goals ==
Scores and results list Belgium's goal tally first.

No.	Date	Venue	Opponent	Score	Result	Competition
1.	22 August 2011	Mönchengladbach, Germany	Russia	3–0	7–1	2011 Men's EuroHockey Championship
2.	24 August 2011	Mönchengladbach, Germany	Spain	2–2	3–2	2011 Men's EuroHockey Championship
3.	26 November 2011	Johannesburg, South Africa	India	2–2	3–3	2011 Men's Hockey Champions Challenge I
4.	27 November 2011	Johannesburg, South Africa	Poland	1–0	7–3	2011 Men's Hockey Champions Challenge I
5.	27 November 2011	Johannesburg, South Africa	Poland	3–0	7–3	2011 Men's Hockey Champions Challenge I
6.	27 November 2011	Johannesburg, South Africa	Poland	5–1	7–3	2011 Men's Hockey Champions Challenge I
7.	27 November 2011	Johannesburg, South Africa	Poland	6–2	7–3	2011 Men's Hockey Champions Challenge I
8.	29 November 2011	Johannesburg, South Africa	South Africa	1–0	2–1	2011 Men's Hockey Champions Challenge I
9.	1 December 2011	Johannesburg, South Africa	Canada	4–0	4–0	2011 Men's Hockey Champions Challenge I
10.	4 December 2011	Johannesburg, South Africa	India	4–3	4–3	2011 Men's Hockey Champions Challenge I
11.	3 August 2012	London, United Kingdom	South Korea	1–0	2–1	2012 Summer Olympics
12.	5 August 2012	London, United Kingdom	New Zealand	1–0	1–1	2012 Summer Olympics
13.	7 August 2012	London, United Kingdom	India	3–0	3–0	2012 Summer Olympics
14.	11 August 2012	London, United Kingdom	Spain	2–1	5–2	2012 Summer Olympics
15.	11 August 2012	London, United Kingdom	Spain	4–1	5–2	2012 Summer Olympics
16.	4 December 2012	Melbourne, Australia	Netherlands	1–3	4–5	2012 Men's Hockey Champions Trophy
17.	4 December 2012	Melbourne, Australia	Netherlands	2–3	4–5	2012 Men's Hockey Champions Trophy
18.	9 December 2012	Melbourne, Australia	Germany	1–0	5–4 (a.e.t.)	2012 Men's Hockey Champions Trophy
19.	6 May 2013	Saint-Germain-en-Laye, France	Portugal	1–0	19–0	2012–13 Men's FIH Hockey World League Round 2
20.	6 May 2013	Saint-Germain-en-Laye, France	Portugal	2–0	19–0	2012–13 Men's FIH Hockey World League Round 2
21.	6 May 2013	Saint-Germain-en-Laye, France	Portugal	8–0	19–0	2012–13 Men's FIH Hockey World League Round 2
22.	6 May 2013	Saint-Germain-en-Laye, France	Portugal	9–0	19–0	2012–13 Men's FIH Hockey World League Round 2
23.	6 May 2013	Saint-Germain-en-Laye, France	Portugal	16–0	19–0	2012–13 Men's FIH Hockey World League Round 2
24.	6 May 2013	Saint-Germain-en-Laye, France	Portugal	18–0	19–0	2012–13 Men's FIH Hockey World League Round 2
25.	6 May 2013	Saint-Germain-en-Laye, France	Portugal	19–0	19–0	2012–13 Men's FIH Hockey World League Round 2
26.	7 May 2013	Saint-Germain-en-Laye, France	Scotland	4–1	7–1	2012–13 Men's FIH Hockey World League Round 2
27.	7 May 2013	Saint-Germain-en-Laye, France	Scotland	6–1	7–1	2012–13 Men's FIH Hockey World League Round 2
28.	9 May 2013	Saint-Germain-en-Laye, France	France	1–1	3–2	2012–13 Men's FIH Hockey World League Round 2
29.	11 May 2013	Saint-Germain-en-Laye, France	Canada	1–0	5–2	2012–13 Men's FIH Hockey World League Round 2
30.	11 May 2013	Saint-Germain-en-Laye, France	Canada	4–1	5–2	2012–13 Men's FIH Hockey World League Round 2
31.	12 May 2013	Saint-Germain-en-Laye, France	Poland	6–0	10–1	2012–13 Men's FIH Hockey World League Round 2
32.	12 May 2013	Saint-Germain-en-Laye, France	Poland	8–1	10–1	2012–13 Men's FIH Hockey World League Round 2
33.	12 May 2013	Saint-Germain-en-Laye, France	Poland	10–1	10–1	2012–13 Men's FIH Hockey World League Round 2
34.	15 June 2013	Rotterdam, Netherlands	France	3–0	3–0	2012–13 Men's FIH Hockey World League Semifinals
35.	19 June 2013	Rotterdam, Netherlands	Ireland	5–2	6–3	2012–13 Men's FIH Hockey World League Semifinals
36.	21 June 2013	Rotterdam, Netherlands	New Zealand	2–1	3–2	2012–13 Men's FIH Hockey World League Semifinals
37.	21 June 2013	Rotterdam, Netherlands	New Zealand	3–1	3–2	2012–13 Men's FIH Hockey World League Semifinals
38.	23 June 2013	Rotterdam, Netherlands	Australia	1–1	2–2 (7–6 p)	2012–13 Men's FIH Hockey World League Semifinals
39.	17 August 2013	Boom, Belgium	Germany	1–1	2–1	2013 Men's EuroHockey Championship
40.	17 August 2013	Boom, Belgium	Germany	2–1	2–1	2013 Men's EuroHockey Championship
41.	19 August 2013	Boom, Belgium	Czech Republic	2–0	4–0	2013 Men's EuroHockey Championship
42.	21 August 2013	Boom, Belgium	Spain	1–0	2–2	2013 Men's EuroHockey Championship
43.	25 August 2013	Boom, Belgium	Germany	1–0	1–3	2013 Men's EuroHockey Championship
44.	2 June 2014	The Hague, Netherlands	Malaysia	1–1	6–2	2014 Men's Hockey World Cup
45.	2 June 2014	The Hague, Netherlands	Malaysia	2–2	6–2	2014 Men's Hockey World Cup
46.	2 June 2014	The Hague, Netherlands	Malaysia	3–2	6–2	2014 Men's Hockey World Cup
47.	2 June 2014	The Hague, Netherlands	Malaysia	5–2	6–2	2014 Men's Hockey World Cup
48.	15 June 2014	The Hague, Netherlands	Germany	1–1	4–2	2014 Men's Hockey World Cup
49.	7 December 2014	Bhubaneswar, India	Australia	4–4	4–4	2014 Men's Hockey Champions Trophy
50.	13 December 2014	Bhubaneswar, India	Netherlands	1–2	2–2 (2–4 p)	2014 Men's Hockey Champions Trophy
51.	1 July 2015	Antwerp, Belgium	France	5–2	5–3	2014–15 Men's FIH Hockey World League Semifinals
52.	23 August 2015	London, England	France	4–3	4–3	2015 Men's EuroHockey Championship
53.	27 August 2015	London, England	Spain	2–0	3–0	2015 Men's EuroHockey Championship
54.	27 August 2015	London, England	Spain	3–0	3–0	2015 Men's EuroHockey Championship
55.	29 August 2015	London, England	Russia	1–0	11–4	2015 Men's EuroHockey Championship
56.	29 August 2015	London, England	Russia	2–0	11–4	2015 Men's EuroHockey Championship
57.	29 August 2015	London, England	Russia	3–2	11–4	2015 Men's EuroHockey Championship
58.	29 August 2015	London, England	Russia	4–2	11–4	2015 Men's EuroHockey Championship
59.	29 August 2015	London, England	Russia	7–3	11–4	2015 Men's EuroHockey Championship
60.	29 August 2015	London, England	Russia	9–3	11–4	2015 Men's EuroHockey Championship
61.	29 August 2015	London, England	Russia	11–4	11–4	2015 Men's EuroHockey Championship
62.	14 August 2016	Rio de Janeiro, Brazil	India	3–1	3–1	2016 Summer Olympics
63.	9 July 2017	Johannesburg, South Africa	Egypt	2–0	10–0	2016–17 Men's FIH Hockey World League Semifinals
64.	9 July 2017	Johannesburg, South Africa	Egypt	9–0	10–0	2016–17 Men's FIH Hockey World League Semifinals
65.	11 July 2017	Johannesburg, South Africa	Ireland	3–1	6–2	2016–17 Men's FIH Hockey World League Semifinals
66.	11 July 2017	Johannesburg, South Africa	Ireland	5–1	6–2	2016–17 Men's FIH Hockey World League Semifinals
67.	11 July 2017	Johannesburg, South Africa	Ireland	6–1	6–2	2016–17 Men's FIH Hockey World League Semifinals
68.	19 July 2017	Johannesburg, South Africa	New Zealand	2–0	2–0	2016–17 Men's FIH Hockey World League Semifinals
69.	23 July 2017	Johannesburg, South Africa	Germany	2–1	6–1	2016–17 Men's FIH Hockey World League Semifinals
70.	21 August 2017	Amstelveen, Netherlands	Netherlands	5–0	5–0	2017 Men's EuroHockey Championship
71.	25 August 2017	Amstelveen, Netherlands	Germany	1–1	2–2 (2–0 p)	2017 Men's EuroHockey Championship
72.	27 August 2017	Amstelveen, Netherlands	Netherlands	1–0	2–4	2017 Men's EuroHockey Championship
73.	2 December 2017	Bhubaneswar, India	Argentina	3–1	3–2	2016–17 Men's FIH Hockey World League Final
74.	5 December 2017	Bhubaneswar, India	Netherlands	3–0	3–0	2016–17 Men's FIH Hockey World League Final
75.	23 June 2018	Breda, Netherlands	Australia	3–2	3–3	2018 Men's Hockey Champions Trophy
76.	1 July 2018	Breda, Netherlands	Pakistan	1–1	2–2 (2–1 p)	2018 Men's Hockey Champions Trophy
77.	11 December 2018	Bhubaneswar, India	Pakistan	5–0	5–0	2018 Men's Hockey World Cup
78.	13 December 2018	Bhubaneswar, India	Germany	2–1	2–1	2018 Men's Hockey World Cup
79.	15 December 2018	Bhubaneswar, India	England	1–0	6–0	2018 Men's Hockey World Cup
80.	26 January 2019	Córdoba, Argentina	Argentina	1–0	4–2	2019 Men's FIH Pro League
81.	26 January 2019	Córdoba, Argentina	Argentina	4–1	4–2	2019 Men's FIH Pro League
82.	10 April 2019	Brussels, Belgium	Spain	2–0	7–3	2019 Men's FIH Pro League
83.	10 April 2019	Brussels, Belgium	Spain	5–0	7–3	2019 Men's FIH Pro League
84.	30 May 2019	Antwerp, Belgium	Great Britain	2–0	4–2	2019 Men's FIH Pro League
85.	9 June 2019	's-Hertogenbosch, Netherlands	Netherlands	2–0	3–4	2019 Men's FIH Pro League
86.	9 June 2019	's-Hertogenbosch, Netherlands	Netherlands	3–4	3–4	2019 Men's FIH Pro League
87.	12 June 2019	Krefeld, Germany	Germany	5–0	8–0	2019 Men's FIH Pro League
88.	28 June 2019	Amstelveen, Netherlands	Netherlands	2–1	3–1	2019 Men's FIH Pro League
89.	16 August 2019	Antwerp, Belgium	Spain	3–0	5–0	2019 Men's EuroHockey Championship
90.	18 August 2019	Antwerp, Belgium	England	1–0	2–0	2019 Men's EuroHockey Championship
91.	20 August 2019	Antwerp, Belgium	Wales	2–0	6–0	2019 Men's EuroHockey Championship
92.	22 August 2019	Antwerp, Belgium	Germany	1–2	4–2	2019 Men's EuroHockey Championship
93.	24 August 2019	Antwerp, Belgium	Spain	3–0	5–0	2019 Men's EuroHockey Championship
116.	1 February 2020	Auckland, New Zealand	New Zealand	3–0	6–2	2020–21 Men's FIH Pro League
117.	1 February 2020	Auckland, New Zealand	New Zealand	6–2	6–2	2020–21 Men's FIH Pro League
118.	31 October 2020	Brussels, Belgium	Great Britain	2–1	3–2	2020–21 Men's FIH Pro League
119.	5 June 2021	Amstelveen, Netherlands	Spain	2–1	4–2	2021 Men's EuroHockey Championship
120.	5 June 2021	Amstelveen, Netherlands	Spain	4–1	4–2	2021 Men's EuroHockey Championship
121.	6 June 2021	Amstelveen, Netherlands	England	1–1	1–2	2021 Men's EuroHockey Championship
122.	8 June 2021	Amstelveen, Netherlands	Russia	7–1	9–2	2021 Men's EuroHockey Championship
123.	12 June 2021	Amstelveen, Netherlands	England	1–0	3–2	2021 Men's EuroHockey Championship
124.	12 June 2021	Amstelveen, Netherlands	England	3–1	3–2	2021 Men's EuroHockey Championship
125.	29 July 2021	Tokyo, Japan	Canada	8–1	9–1	2020 Summer Olympics
126.	30 July 2021	Tokyo, Japan	Great Britain	1–1	2–2	2020 Summer Olympics
127.	1 August 2021	Tokyo, Japan	Spain	2–1	3–1	2020 Summer Olympics
286.	2 June 2024	Antwerp, Belgium	Australia	1–1	4–4 (3–2 p)	2023–24 Men's FIH Pro League
287.	25 June 2024	Utrecht, Netherlands	Netherlands	1–0	1–3	2023–24 Men's FIH Pro League
288.	27 July 2024	Paris, France	Ireland	1–0	2–0	2024 Summer Olympics
289.	30 July 2024	Paris, France	Australia	2–0	6–2	2024 Summer Olympics
290.	30 July 2024	Paris, France	Australia	3–1	6–2	2024 Summer Olympics
291.	30 July 2024	Paris, France	Australia	6–2	6–2	2024 Summer Olympics
324.	9 December 2025	Dublin, Ireland	Germany	1–0	4–1	2025–26 Men's FIH Pro League
325.	12 December 2025	Dublin, Ireland	Germany	4–0	4–1	2025–26 Men's FIH Pro League
326.	14 December 2025	Dublin, Ireland	England	2–1	3–2	2025–26 Men's FIH Pro League
327.	14 December 2025	Dublin, Ireland	England	3–2	3–2	2025–26 Men's FIH Pro League
328.	10 February 2026	Rourkela, India	Argentina	1–2	5–3	2025–26 Men's FIH Pro League
329.	10 February 2026	Rourkela, India	Argentina	3–3	5–3	2025–26 Men's FIH Pro League
330.	10 February 2026	Rourkela, India	Argentina	5–3	5–3	2025–26 Men's FIH Pro League
331.	13 June 2026	Wavre, Belgium	Pakistan	7–1	7–1	2025–26 Men's FIH Pro League
332.	16 June 2026	Wavre, Belgium	Spain	1–0	3–1	2025–26 Men's FIH Pro League
333.	18 June 2026	Wavre, Belgium	Pakistan	2–0	6–0	2025–26 Men's FIH Pro League
334.	18 June 2026	Wavre, Belgium	Pakistan	3–0	6–0	2025–26 Men's FIH Pro League
335.	18 June 2026	Wavre, Belgium	Pakistan	5–0	6–0	2025–26 Men's FIH Pro League
336.	21 June 2026	Wavre, Belgium	Spain	3–2	3–2	2025–26 Men's FIH Pro League
337.	24 June 2026	Wavre, Belgium	Netherlands	2–2	2–2 (4–3 p)	2025–26 Men's FIH Pro League
338.	25 June 2026	Wavre, Belgium	Australia	1–0	1–2	2025–26 Men's FIH Pro League
339.	27 June 2026	Wavre, Belgium	Netherlands	2–0	2–1	2025–26 Men's FIH Pro League
340.	28 June 2026	Wavre, Belgium	Australia	2–4	5–4	2025–26 Men's FIH Pro League
341.	28 June 2026	Wavre, Belgium	Australia	4–4	5–4	2025–26 Men's FIH Pro League
342.	28 June 2026	Wavre, Belgium	Australia	5–4	5–4	2025–26 Men's FIH Pro League
343.	19 August 2026	Wavre, Belgium	Malaysia	1–0	5–3	2026 Men's FIH Hockey World Cup
344.	19 August 2026	Wavre, Belgium	Malaysia	2–0	5–3	2026 Men's FIH Hockey World Cup
345.	19 August 2026	Wavre, Belgium	Malaysia	3–1	5–3	2026 Men's FIH Hockey World Cup
346.	19 August 2026	Wavre, Belgium	Malaysia	5–2	5–3	2026 Men's FIH Hockey World Cup
347.	21 August 2026	Wavre, Belgium	Australia	1–1	1–1	2026 Men's FIH Hockey World Cup
