= Rot-Weiss Köln =

- Full name: Kölner Tennis- und Hockey-Club Stadion Rot-Weiss e.V.
- Nickname(s): Rot-Weiss Köln
- Short name: RWK
- League: Men's Bundesliga; Women's Bundesliga
- Founded: 1906; 120 years ago
- Home ground: Kölner Stadtwald; Cologne, Germany
- Website: Club website
Home	Away

Kölner Tennis- und Hockey-Club Stadion Rot-Weiss e.V., also known as KTHC Stadion Rot-Weiss or simply Rot-Weiss Köln, is a German professional field hockey and tennis club based in Cologne, North Rhine-Westphalia. The home ground is the Kölner Stadtwald.

The men's 1st XI have won the Bundesliga nine times, and have also competed in the Euro Hockey League, which they won in the 2016–17 season. The women's 1st XI have won the Bundesliga five times.

== Honours ==
=== Men ===
Bundesliga

- Winners (11): 1971–72, 1972–73, 1973–74, 2008–09, 2009–10, 2012–13, 2014–15, 2015–16, 2019–2021, 2021–22, 2022–23
- Runners-up (9): 1965–66, 1969–70, 1970–71, 1974–75, 1989–90, 2011–12, 2013–14, 2016–17, 2017–18

Euro Hockey League

- Winners (1): 2016–17
- Runners-up (3): 2018–19, 2022, 2022–23

Indoor Bundesliga

- Winners (11): 1973–74, 1977–78, 1985–86, 1988–89, 1991–92, 1992–93, 1994–95, 2008–09, 2011–12, 2016–17, 2019–20
- Runners-up (7): 1964–65, 1975–76, 1989–90, 1990–91, 2013–14, 2014–15, 2015–16

EuroHockey Indoor Club Cup

- Winners (9): 1990, 1991, 1993, 1994, 1995, 1996, 2010, 2013, 2018
- Runners-up (1): 1992, 1997

=== Women ===
Bundesliga

- Winners (5): 1997–98, 2002–03, 2006–07, 2011–12, 2013–14
- Runners-up (7): 1998–99, 1999–00, 2003–04, 2004–05, 2007–08, 2010–11, 2015–16

EuroHockey Club Champions Cup

- Winners (1): 1999

EuroHockey Cup Winners Cup

- Winners (1): 2000

Indoor Bundesliga

- Winners (2): 1964–65, 2011–12
- Runners-up (3): 2005–06, 2006–07, 2025–26

== Current squad ==
=== Men's squad ===
As of 2021–22

No.	Pos.	Nation	Player
1	GK	GER	Felix Langer
1	GK	GER	Miro Masanek
2	FW	GER	Elias Würker
3	MF	GER	Mats Grambusch
4	DF	GER	Lukas Trompertz
5	DF	GER	Kai Aichinger
7	FW	GER	Fabio Seitz
8	MF	GER	Florian Adrians
9	MF	GER	Luis Höchemer
10	MF	GER	Moritz Trompertz
11	MF	GER	Florian Scholten
12	FW	GER	Frederik Nyström
13	DF	GER	Florian Pelzner
14	FW	GER	Quentin Halfmann
15	DF	GER	Tom Grambusch
16	DF	GER	Antheus Barry

No.	Pos.	Nation	Player
17	FW	GER	Christopher Rühr
18	MF	GER	Maximilian Siegburg
19	FW	GER	Ole Boelke
20		GER	Ben Duetz
21	GK	BEL	Vincent Vanasch
22	FW	GER	Sven Alex
23	FW	GER	Thies Prinz
24	DF	GER	Johannes Große
25	MF	GER	Henrik Siegburg
26	FW	GER	Elian Mazkour
27	MF	GER	Timur Oruz
28		GER	Leon Lindemann
29	GK	GER	Joshua Onyekwue Nnaji
30	DF	NED	Mink van der Weerden
33	FW	GER	Caspar Laschet
36	GK	GER	Nick Radermacher
