= Royal Beerschot THC =

Sports club in Kontich, Belgium

Coordinates: 51°08′28″N 4°25′58″E

Beerschot
- Full name: Royal Beerschot Tennis & Hockey Club
- League: National 1
- Founded: 3 December 1899; 126 years ago
- Website: Club website
Home	Away

The Beerschot Tennis Club, now known as the Royal Beerschot Tennis and Hockey Club is a field hockey and tennis club founded in 1899 in Kontich, Belgium, located in neighboring Antwerp. It hosted the tennis events for the 1920 Summer Olympics.

== Honours ==
=== Men ===
Men's Belgian Hockey League: 6

- 1925, 1927, 1932, 1934, 1942, 1944

=== Women ===
Belgian national title: 5

- 1942–43, 1943–44, 1945–46, 1946–47, 1951–52

== Men's squad ==
As of 2021–22

No.	Pos.	Nation	Player
1	GK	BEL	Harry Verhoeven
2	FW	BEL	Jérôme Saeys
3	DF	BEL	Arthur De Sloover
6	DF	BEL	Romain Penelle
7	DF	BEL	Max Goudsmet
8	MF	WAL	Jacob Draper
9	MF	BEL	Sydney Cabuy
10	FW	BEL	Louis Capelle
11	FW	BEL	Gaetan Perez
14	MF	BEL	Harrison Peeters

No.	Pos.	Nation	Player
17	DF	BEL	Henry Nelen
18	DF	ENG	Brendan Creed
20	DF	BEL	Marin Peeters
21	DF	BEL	Hugo Du Monceau
22	MF	ITA	Francois Sior
26	FW	BEL	Roman Duvekot
28	FW	BEL	Axel De Bolle
30	MF	BEL	Maxime Gus
31	GK	BEL	Pierre De Gratie
33	FW	BEL	Maxime Capelle
