= Men's Feldhockey Bundesliga =

Sports league

Bundesliga
- Sport: Field hockey
- Founded: 1937; 89 years ago
- First season: 1973–74
- Administrator: Deutscher Hockey-Bund
- No. of teams: 12
- Country: Germany
- Confederation: EHF (Europe)
- Most recent champion: Hamburger Polo Club (1st title) (2025–26)
- Most titles: Uhlenhorst Mülheim (18 titles)
- Relegation to: 2. Bundesliga
- International cup: Men's Euro Hockey League
- Website: hockeybundesliga.de

The Feldhockey Bundesliga is the top level of men's field hockey in Germany and is managed by the German Hockey Federation. The league currently ranks first in the men's European league rankings. It was established in 1937.

== Format ==
The season starts in August or September and is interrupted by the indoor hockey season from November to March. From April the outdoor season will be continued. Since the 2011–12 season the league was played by twelve teams who played each other twice and who competed for four spots in the championship play-offs. The number one and four and the number two and three played each other in the semi-final and winners qualified for the final where the winner was crowned champion. The two last-placed teams were relegated to the 2nd Bundesliga.

For the 2019–20 season the German Hockey Federation introduced a new format. The league is played by twelve teams grouped in two pools of six (Pool A and Pool B) based on the previous season's ranking. The teams of the same pool compete 2 times and face the teams of the other pool once. The first four of each pool are qualified for the play-offs and the last two of each pool play the play-downs.

The quarter-finals of the play-offs are played in best-of-2 according to the following scheme:

- Series 1: 1A/4B
- Series 2: 2B/3A
- Series 3: 1B/4A
- Series 4: 2A/3B

== Finals ==
1937–1986
Season	Winner	Result	Runners-up	Venue
1937	Berliner SC (1)	2–1 (a.e.t)	ETUF Essen (1)	Berlin
1937–38	Berliner SC (2)	1–0	Sachsenhausen (1)	Frankfurt
1938–39	Sachsenhausen (1)	1–0	Berliner SC (1)	Berlin
1939–40	Berliner SV (1)	5–0	Sachsenhausen (2)	Berlin
1940–41	Berliner HC (1)	1–0	Pasing (1)	Munich
1941–42	Berliner HC (2)	1–1 (a.e.t); 5–3 (Note: An extra match was needed because the previous match ended in a draw after extra time)	Sachsenhausen (3)	Frankfurt; Berlin
1942–43	Sachsenhausen (2)	2–1	UHC Hamburg (1)	Frankfurt
1943–44	LSV Hamburg (1)	1–0 (a.e.t)	Sachsenahausen (3)	Magdeburg
1949–50	Uhlenhorst Mülheim (1)	1–0	Club Raffelberg (1)	Mülheim
1950–51	Club Raffelberg (1)	1–0	Uhlenhorst Mülheim (1)	Duisburg
1951–52	Klipper THC (1)	3–1	Wacker München (1)	Munich
1952–53	Club Raffelberg (2)	1–0 (a.e.t.)	Uhlenhorst Mülheim (2)	Mülheim
1953–54	Uhlenhorst Mülheim (2)	4–2	Brandenburg (1)	Mülheim
1954–55	Uhlenhorst Mülheim (3)	1–0	Wacker München (2)	Mülheim
1955–56	Brandenburg (1)	2–1	Goslar (1)	Goslar
1956–57	Uhlenhorst Mülheim (4)	1–1 (a.e.t.); 2–0	Club Raffelberg (2)	Duisburg; Mülheim
1957–58	Uhlenhorst Mülheim (5)	5–1	Klipper THC (1)	Mülheim
1958–59	Brandenburg (1)	1–0	Uhlenhorst Mülheim (3)	Mülheim
1959–60	Uhlenhorst Mülheim (6)	2–1 (a.e.t.)	Berliner HC (1)	Mülheim
1960–61	Berliner HC (3)	3–1 (e.a.t.)	Uhlenhorst Mülheim (4)	Mülheim
1961–62	Berliner HC (4)	3–0	Ludwigsburg (1)	Ludwigsburg
1962–63	Berliner HC (5)	4–1 (a.e.t.)	Harvestehuder THC (1)	Berlin
1963–64	Uhlenhorst Mülheim (7)	2–1	HG Nürnberg (1)	Mülheim
1964–65	Berliner HC (6)	2–1 (a.e.t.)	UHC Hamburg (2)	Berlin
1965–66	Gladbacher HTC (1)	3–2 (a.e.t.)	Rot-Weiss Köln (1)	Cologne
1967–68	Rüsselsheimer RK (1)	4–1	Schwarz-Weiß Köln (1)	Rüsselsheim
1968–69	1880 Frankfurt (1)	2–1	Schwarz-Weiß Köln (1)	Cologne
1969–70	1880 Frankfurt (2)	3–0	Rot-Weiss Köln (2)	Cologne
1970–71	Rüsselsheimer RK (2)	1–0	Rot-Weiss Köln (3)	Rüsselsheim
1971–72	Rot-Weiss Köln (3)	2–1 (a.e.t.)	1880 Frankfurt (1)	Cologne
1972–73	Rot-Weiss Köln (4)	2–0	Rüsselsheimer RK (1)	Rüsselsheim
1973–74	Rot-Weiss Köln (5)	3–1 (a.e.t.)	Rüsselheimer RK (2)	Cologne
1974–75	Rüsselsheimer RK (3)	5–3 (a.e.t.)	Rot-Weiss Köln (4)	Rüsselsheim
1975–76	Schwarz-Weiß Köln (1)	3–1	Stuttgarter Kickers (1)	Cologne
1976–77	Rüsselsheimer RK (4)	4–1	Stuttgarter Kickers (2)	Rüsselsheim
1977–78	Rüsselsheimer RK (5)	2–0	Gladbacher HTC (1)	Mönchengladbach
1978–79	Frankenthal (1)	2–1	Hannover (1)	Frankenthal
1979–80	Frankenthal (2)	4–3 (a.e.t.)	Schwarz-Weiß Köln (2)	Frankenthal
1980–81	Gladbacher HTC (2)	5–1	Frankenthal (1)	Frankenthal
1981–82	Heidelberg (1)	3–2	Limburger HC (1)	Heidelberg
1982–83	Frankenthal (3)	2–0	Schwarz-Weiß Köln (3)	Cologne
1983–84	Limburger HC (1)	3–1	Heidelberg (1)	Heidelberg
1984–85	Uhlenhorst Mülheim (8)	3–1 (a.e.t.)	Gladbacher HTC (2)	Mönchengladbach
1985–86	Uhlenhorst Mülheim (9)	4–3	Stuttgarter Kickers (3)	Limburg

1986–present
Season	Winner	Result	Runners-up	Venue
1986–87	Uhlenhorst Mülheim (10)	2–1	1880 Frankfurt (2)	Mülheim
1987–88	Uhlenhorst Mülheim (11)	3–1	1880 Frankfurt (3)	Frankfurt
1988–89	1880 Frankfurt (3)	3–2 (p.s.)	Uhlenhorst Mülheim (5)	Mülheim
1989–90	Uhlenhorst Mülheim (12)	3–0	Rot-Weiss Köln (5)	Cologne
1990–91	Uhlenhorst Mülheim (13)	2–1 (a.e.t.)	Rot-Weiß München (1)	Mülheim
1991–92	Dürkheimer HC (1)	7–5 (p.s.)	Uhlenhorst Mülheim (6)	Bad Dürkheim
1992–93	Dürkheimer HC (2)	2–1	Harvestehuder THC (2)	Bad Dürkheim
1993–94	Uhlenhorst Mülheim (14)	3–0	Harvestehuder THC (3)	Mülheim
1994–95	Uhlenhorst Mülheim (15)	6–1	Gladbacher HTC (3)	Mülheim
1995–96	Harvestehuder THC (1)	2–1	Uhlenhorst Mülheim (7)	Mülheim
1996–97	Uhlenhorst Mülheim (16)	6–1	1880 Frankfurt (4)	Bad Dürkheim
1997–98	Harvestehuder THC (2)	7–6 (p.s.)	Gladbacher HTC (4)	Rüsselsheim
1998–99	Club an der Alster (1)	3–2	Harvestehuder THC (4)	Hamburg
1999–2000	Harvestehuder THC (3)	9–8 (p.s.)	Club an der Alster (1)	Mainz
2000–01	Club an der Alster (2)	2–1	Dürkheimer HC (1)	Bad Dürkheim
2001–02	Gladbacher THC (3)	2–1	Club an der Alster (2)	Hamburg
2002–03	Club an der Alster (3)	5–4	Crefelder HTC (1)	Hamburg
2003–04	Club an der Alster (4)	6–5	UHC Hamburg (2)	Hamburg
2004–05	Stuttgarter Kickers (1)	5–4 (p.s.)	Club an der Alster (3)	Düsseldorf
2005–06	Crefelder HTC (1)	7–1	Stuttgarter Kickers (4)	Mönchengladbach
2006–07	Club an der Alster (5)	9–8 (p.s.)	UHC Hamburg (3)	Mönchengladbach
2007–08	Club an der Alster (6)	5–2	Düsseldorfer HC (1)	Düsseldorf
2008–09	Rot-Weiss Köln (4)	4–2 (a.e.t.)	UHC Hamburg (4)	Mannheim
2009–10	Rot-Weiss Köln (5)	4–2	UHC Hamburg (5)	Düsseldorf
2010–11	Club an der Alster (7)	4–1	Uhlenhorst Mülheim (8)	Mannheim
2011–12	Berliner HC (7)	2–1	Rot-Weiss Köln (6)	Berlin
2012–13	Rot-Weiss Köln (6)	3–2	Uhlenhorst Mülheim (9)	Hamburg
2013–14	Harvestehuder THC (4)	5–1	Rot-Weiss Köln (7)	Hamburg
2014–15	Rot-Weiss Köln (7)	4–3	UHC Hamburg (6)	Hamburg
2015–16	Rot-Weiss Köln (8)	2–2 (a.e.t.) (6–5 s.o.)	UHC Hamburg (7)	Mannheim
2016–17	Mannheimer HC (1)	3–2	Rot-Weiss Köln (8)	Mannheim
2017–18	Uhlenhorst Mülheim (17)	3–2	Rot-Weiss Köln (9)	Krefeld
2018–19	Uhlenhorst Mülheim (18)	5–4	Mannheimer HC (1)	Krefeld
2019–2021	Rot-Weiss Köln (9)	1–0	Uhlenhorst Mülheim (10)	Mannheim
2021–22	Rot-Weiss Köln (10)	1–0	Hamburger Polo Club (1)	Bonn
2022–23	Rot-Weiss Köln (11)	3–2	Mannheimer HC (2)	Mannheim
2023–24	Mannheimer HC (2)	2–2 (2–0 s.o.)	Hamburger Polo Club (2)	Bonn
2024–25	Crefelder HTC (2)	3–1	Rot-Weiss Köln (10)	Krefeld
2025–26	Hamburger Polo Club (1)	4–0	Uhlenhorst Mülheim (11)	Bonn

== Champions ==
=== By club ===
Club	Championships	Runners-up	Seasons won
Uhlenhorst Mülheim	18	11	1949–50, 1953–54, 1954–55, 1956–57, 1957–58, 1959–60, 1963–64, 1984–85, 1985–86, 1986–87, 1987–88, 1989–90, 1990–91, 1993–94, 1994–95, 1996–97, 2017–18, 2018–19
Rot-Weiss Köln	11	10	1971–72, 1972–73, 1973–74, 2008–09, 2009–10, 2012–13, 2014–15, 2015–16, 2019–21, 2021–22, 2022–23
Club an der Alster	7	3	1998–99, 2000–01, 2002–03, 2003–04, 2006–07, 2007–08, 2010–11
Berliner HC	7	2	1940–41, 1941–42, 1960–61, 1961–62, 1962–63, 1964–65, 2011–12
Rüsselsheimer RK	5	2	1967–68, 1970–71, 1974–75, 1976–77, 1977–78
Harvestehuder THC	4	4	1995–96, 1997–98, 1999–2000, 2013–14
1880 Frankfurt	3	4	1968–69, 1969–70, 1988–89
Gladbacher HTC	3	4	1965–66, 1980–81, 2001–02
Frankenthal	3	1	1978–79, 1979–80, 1982–83
Sachsenhausen	2	4	1938–39, 1942–43
Club Raffelberg	2	2	1950–51, 1952–53
Mannheimer HC	2	2	2016–17, 2023–24
Brandenburg	2	1	1955–56, 1958–59
Dürkheim	2	1	1991–92, 1992–93
Crefelder HTC	2	1	2005–06, 2024–25
Berliner SC	2	0	1937, 1937–38
Schwarz-Weiß Köln	1	4	1975–76
Stuttgarter Kickers	1	4	2004–05
Hamburger Polo Club	1	2	2025–26
Limburg	1	1	1983–84
Heidelberg	1	1	1981–82
Klipper THC	1	1	1951–52
LSV Hamburg	1	0	1943–44
Berliner SV	1	0	1939–40
UHC Hamburg	0	8	
Wacker München	0	2	
Düsseldorfer HC	0	1	
ETUF Essen	0	1	
Goslar	0	1	
Hannover	0	1	
Ludwigsburg	0	1	
Pasing	0	1	
HG Nürnberg	0	1	
Rot-Weiß München	0	1	

=== By state ===
State	Championships	Runners-up	Winning clubs
North Rhine-Westphalia	37	34	Uhlenhorst Mülheim (18), Rot-Weiss Köln (11), Gladbacher HTC (3), Club Raffelberg (2), Crefelder HTC (2), Schwarz-Weiß Köln (1)
Hamburg	14	18	Club an der Alster (7), Harvestehuder THC (4), Hamburger Polo Club (1), Klipper THC (1), LSV Hamburg (1)
Berlin	12	3	Berliner HC (7), Brandenburg (2), Berliner SC (2), Berliner SV (1)
Hesse	11	11	Rüsselsheimer RK (5), 1880 Frankfurt (3), Sachsenhausen (2), Limburger HC (1)
Rhineland-Palatinate	5	2	Frankenthal (3), Dürkheimer HC (2)
Baden-Württemberg	4	8	Mannheimer HC (2), Stuttgarter Kickers (1), Heidelberg (1)
Bavaria	0	5	
Lower Saxony	0	2	

== See also ==
- Women's Feldhockey Bundesliga
- German Hockey Federation
