= Royal Daring =

Belgian field hockey club

- Full name: Royal Daring Hockey Club Molenbeek
- League: Men's Belgian Hockey League; Women's Belgian Hockey League
- Founded: 14 May 1922; 104 years ago
- Website: Club website
Home

Royal Daring Hockey Club Molenbeek, commonly known as Royal Daring or simply Daring, is a Belgian field hockey club based in Molenbeek-Saint-Jean, Brussels. Both the first men's and women's team play in the highest division of Belgian hockey.

The hockey club Royal Daring was founded on 14 May 1922 as part of the football club R. Daring Club Molenbeek. The men's team have won the Belgian title four times from 1945 until 1949. The men's team reached the semi-finals of the Euro Hockey League in the 2014–15 season.

== Honours ==
Men's Belgian Hockey League

- Winners (4): 1945–46, 1946–47, 1947–48, 1948–49

== Current squad ==
As of 2022–23

No.	Pos.	Nation	Player
1	GK	BEL	Grégoire Denis
3	DF	BEL	Gilles Veulemans
4	DF	BEL	Nathan Denis
7	MF	BEL	Thomas Vander Gracht
8	MF	ARG	Nahuel Salis
9	FW	BEL	Alex Vanlindthoudt
10	FW	ARG	Santiago Montelli
11	FW	FRA	Benjamin Marqué
13	FW	BEL	Tom Van Droogenbroeck
14	MF	ARG	Joaquin Kruger

No.	Pos.	Nation	Player
15	GK	BEL	Boris Feldheim
16	DF	BEL	Antoine Legrain
18	DF	ESP	Alejo Bonanni
21	FW	FRA	Xavier Esmenjaud
22	DF	RSA	Daniel Bell
24	DF	ARG	Manuel Brunet
27	MF	BEL	Geoffroy Cosyns
29	DF	BEL	Nathan Delos
38	FW	BEL	Thomas Leffler
48	FW	BEL	Thomas Jacqmotte
