= Men's Belgian Hockey League =

Field hockey league

- Current season, competition or edition: 2025–26 Men's Belgian Hockey League
- Sport: Field hockey
- Founded: 1919; 107 years ago
- First season: 1919–20
- Administrator: Royal Belgian Hockey Association
- No. of teams: 12
- Country: Belgium
- Confederation: EHF (Europe)
- Most recent champion: Gantoise (4th title) (2024–25)
- Most titles: Léopold (28 titles)
- Level on pyramid: 1
- Relegation to: National 1
- International cup: Euro Hockey League

The Men's Belgian Hockey League is a field hockey league organised by the Royal Belgian Hockey Association. The league was established in 1919 as the Division 1. Between the 2006–07 and the 2015–16 seasons it was known as the Honor Division.

Sixteen different clubs have won the league with a 28 times record for Léopold. The current champion is Gantoise, having won the 2023–24 season by defeating Waterloo Ducks in the championship final.

== Format ==
The season usually starts in September and ends around the end of April or the beginning of May. From the 2021–22 season onwards the league is played by twelve teams who play each other twice and who compete for four spots in the championship play-offs. The number one and four and the number two and three play each other in the semi-final and the winners qualify for the final where the winner will be crowned champion. The last two teams are relegated to the National 1 and the tenth placed team plays a relegation play-off against the third-placed team in the second division.

== Teams ==
2024–25 Men's Belgian Hockey League teams
Location of Brussels teams in the 2024–25 Men's Belgian Hockey League

Beerschot and Namur are the two promoted clubs from the 2023–24 National 1, replacing Victory and White Star.

Team	Location	Province
Beerschot	Kontich	Antwerp
Braxgata	Boom	Antwerp
Daring	Molenbeek-Saint-Jean	Brussels
Dragons	Brasschaat	Antwerp
Gantoise	Ghent	East Flanders
Herakles	Lier	Antwerp
Léopold	Uccle	Brussels
Namur	Saint-Servais	Namur
Orée	Woluwe-Saint-Pierre	Brussels
Racing	Uccle	Brussels
Uccle Sport	Uccle	Brussels
Waterloo Ducks	Waterloo	Walloon Brabant

=== Number of teams by provinces ===
Province	Number of teams	Team(s)
Brussels	5	Daring, Léopold, Orée, Racing, Uccle Sport
Antwerp	4	Beerschot, Braxgata, Dragons, Herakles
East Flanders	1	Gantoise
Namur	1	Namur
Walloon Brabant	1	Waterloo Ducks
Total	12	

== Champions ==
=== By year ===
1919–1955
No.	Season	Champion
01	1919–20	Brussels HLTC (1)
02	1920–21	Gantoise (1)
03	1921–22	Léopold (1)
04	1922–23	Léopold (2)
05	1923–24	Racing (1)
06	1924–25	Beerschot (1)
07	1925–26	Rasante (1)
08	1926–27	Beerschot (2)
09	1927-28	Léopold (3)
10	1928-29	Rasante (2)
11	1929-30	Rasante (3)
12	1930-31	Rasante (4)
13	1931-32	Beerschot (3)
14	1932-33	Racing (2)
15	1933-34	Beerschot (4)
16	1934-35	Racing (3)
17	1935-36	Racing (4)
18	1936-37	Rasante (5)
19	1937-38	Rasante (6)
20	1938-39	Léopold (4)
21	1939-40	Rasante (7)
22	1940-41	Racing (5)
23	1941-42	Beerschot (5)
24	1942-43	Rasante (8)
25	1943-44	Beerschot (6)
26	1944-45	Rasante (9)
27	1945-46	Daring (1)
28	1946-47	Daring (2)
29	1947-48	Daring (3)
30	1948-49	Daring (4)
31	1949-50	Victory (1)
32	1950-51	Léopold (5)
33	1951-52	Léopold (6)
34	1952-53	Rasante (10)
35	1953-54	Rasante (11)
36	1954–55	Léopold (7)

1955–1991
No.	Season	Champion
37	1955-56	Rasante (12)
38	1956-57	Rasante (13)
39	1958-59	Rasante (14)
40	1958-59	Léopold (8)
41	1959-60	Léopold (9)
42	1960-61	Léopold (10)
43	1961-62	Victory (2)
44	1962-63	Not finished
45	1963-64	Uccle Sport (1)
46	1964-65	Uccle Sport (2)
47	1965-66	Léopold (11)
48	1966-67	Léopold (12)
49	1967-68	Léopold (13)
50	1968-69	Léopold (14)
51	1969-70	Léopold (15)
52	1970-71	Léopold (16)
53	1971-72	Léopold (17)
54	1972-73	Léopold (18)
55	1973-74	Léopold (19)
56	1974-75	Uccle Sport (3)
57	1975-76	Uccle Sport (4)
58	1976-77	Uccle Sport (5)
59	1977-78	Uccle Sport (6)
60	1978-79	Léopold (20)
61	1979-80	Uccle Sport (7)
62	1980-81	Uccle Sport (8)
63	1981-82	Uccle Sport (9)
64	1982-83	Uccle Sport (10)
65	1983-84	Uccle Sport (11)
66	1984-85	Uccle Sport (12)
67	1985-86	Rasante (15)
68	1986-87	Uccle Sport (13)
69	1987-88	Léopold (21)
70	1988–89	Léopold (22)
71	1989-90	Rasante (16)
72	1990-91	Léopold (23)

1991–2027
No.	Season	Champion
73	1991-92	Léopold (24)
74	1992-93	Baudouin (1)
75	1993-94	Baudouin (2)
76	1994-95	Baudouin (3)
77	1995-96	White Star (1)
78	1996-97	Dragons (1)
79	1997-98	Herakles (1)
80	1998-99	Dragons (2)
81	1999-2000	Dragons (3)
82	2000-01	Dragons (4)
83	2001-02	Léopold (25)
84	2002-03	Dragons (5)
85	2003-04	Léopold (26)
86	2004-05	Léopold (27)
87	2005-06	Waterloo Ducks (1)
88	2006-07	Antwerp (1)
89	2007-08	Leuven (1)
90	2008-09	Waterloo Ducks (2)
91	2009-10	Dragons (6)
92	2010-11	Dragons (7)
93	2011-12	Waterloo Ducks (3)
94	2012-13	Waterloo Ducks (4)
95	2013-14	Waterloo Ducks (5)
96	2014-15	Dragons (8)
97	2015-16	Dragons (9)
98	2016-17	Dragons (10)
99	2017-18	Dragons (11)
100	2018-19	Léopold (28)
–	2019-20	Not finished
101	2020-21	Dragons (12)
102	2021–22	Racing (6)
103	2022–23	Gantoise (2)
104	2023–24	Gantoise (3)
105	2024–25	Gantoise (4)
106	2025–26	Waterloo Ducks (6)
107	2026–27	

=== By club ===
Club	Championship(s)	Year(s) won
Léopold	28	1921–22, 1922–23, 1927–28, 1938–39, 1950–51, 1951–52, 1954–55, 1958–59, 1959–60, 1960–61, 1965–66, 1966–67, 1967–68, 1968–69, 1969–70, 1970–71, 1971–72, 1972–73, 1973–74, 1978–79, 1987–88, 1988–89, 1990–91, 1991–92, 2001–02, 2003–04, 2004–05, 2018–19
Rasante	16	1925–26, 1928–29, 1929–30, 1930–31, 1936–37, 1937–38, 1939–40, 1942–43, 1944–45, 1952–53, 1953–54, 1955–56, 1956–57, 1957–58, 1985–86, 1989–90
Uccle Sport	13	1963–64, 1964–65, 1974–75, 1975–76, 1976–77, 1977–78, 1979–80, 1980–81, 1981–82, 1982–83, 1983–84, 1984–85, 1986–87
Dragons	12	1996–97, 1998–99, 1999–2000, 2000–01, 2002–03, 2009–10, 2010–11, 2014–15, 2015–16, 2016–17, 2017–18, 2020–21
Beerschot	6	1924–25, 1926–27, 1931–32, 1933–34, 1941–42, 1943–44
Racing	6	1923–24, 1932–33, 1934–35, 1935–36, 1940–41, 2021–22
Waterloo Ducks	6	2005–06, 2008–09, 2011–12, 2012–13, 2013–14, 2025-26
Gantoise	4	1920–21, 2022–23, 2023–24, 2024–25
Daring	4	1945–46, 1946–47, 1947–48, 1948–49
Baudouin	3	1992–93, 1993–94, 1994–95
Victory	2	1949–50, 1961–62
Brussels HLTC	1	1919–20
White Star	1	1995–96
Herakles	1	1997–98
Antwerp	1	2006–07
Leuven	1	2007–08

=== By province ===
Province	Championships	Clubs
Brussels	69	Léopold (28), Rasante (16), Uccle Sport (13), Racing (6), Daring (4), Brussels HLTC (1), White Star (1)
Antwerp	22	Dragons (12), Beerschot (6), Victory (2), Herakles (1), Antwerp (1)
Walloon Brabant	5	Waterloo Ducks (5)
Flemish Brabant	4	Baudouin (3), Leuven (1)
East Flanders	4	Gantoise (4)

== See also ==
- Women's Belgian Hockey League
