= Christopher Rühr =

German field hockey player

Personal information
- Full name: Jan Christopher Rühr
- Born: 19 December 1993 (age 32) Düsseldorf, Germany
- Height: 1.80 m (5 ft 11 in)
- Weight: 77 kg (170 lb)

Sport
- Sport: Field hockey
- Position: Forward
Youth career
- Team
- –: Kahlenberger HTC
- –: Uhlenhorst Mülheim
Senior career
Years	Team	Caps	Goals
–2014	Uhlenhorst Mülheim	-	-
2014–2015	Club an der Alster	-	-
2015–present	Rot-Weiss Köln	-	-
2017	→ Ranchi Rays	8	2
National team
Years	Team	Caps	Goals
2012–present	Germany	142	(64)
Medal record
Representing Germany
Men's field hockey
Olympic Games
Silver medal – second place	2024 Paris	Team
Bronze medal – third place	2016 Rio de Janeiro	Team
World Cup
Gold medal – first place	2023 Bhubaneswar/Rourkela
Gold medal – first place	2026 Wavre/Amstelveen
EuroHockey Championship
Silver medal – second place	2015 London
Silver medal – second place	2021 Amstelveen
Champions Trophy
Gold medal – first place	2014 Bhubaneswar
Junior World Cup
Gold medal – first place	2013 New Delhi
Men's indoor hockey
Indoor World Cup
Silver medal – second place	2018 Berlin
- Updated on 24 July 2021

Jan Christopher Rühr (born 19 December 1993) is a German field hockey player who plays as a forward for Rot-Weiss Köln and the Germany national team.

Rühr was awarded the FIH Rising Star of the Year Award in 2013 and 2015. He represented his country at the 2016 Summer Olympics, where he won the bronze medal.

He was educated at Seaford College.

== Career ==
Rühr played in his childhood as his 3 older siblings at Kahlenberger HTC, he played in the youth of Uhlenhorst Mülheim for 10 years and in the 2014–15 season in Hamburg for Club an der Alster for one year. He was voted "talent of the world" in January 2014, moved to Rot-Weiss Köln in 2015 and won the German field hockey championship in his first season with the Cologne team. In January 2016, he was voted the "Rising Star" (Best Youth Player of the World) for the second time. On 28 May 2021, he was named in the squads for the 2021 EuroHockey Championship and the 2020 Summer Olympics.

Preceded by Florian Fuchs	FIH Rising Star of the Year; 2013	Succeeded by Gonzalo Peillat
Preceded by Gonzalo Peillat	FIH Rising Star of the Year; 2015	Succeeded by Arthur van Doren
