= Jérôme Truyens =

Belgian field hockey player

Personal information
- Nationality: Belgian
- Born: 4 August 1987 (age 39) Uccle, Belgium
- Height: 1.78 m (5 ft 10 in)
- Weight: 70 kg (154 lb)

Sport
- Country: Belgium
- Sport: Field hockey
Medal record
Olympic Games
| Silver medal – second place | 2016 Rio de Janeiro | Team |

Jérôme Truyens (born 4 August 1987) is a Belgian international field hockey player. He plays for Royal Racing Club de Bruxelles in Brussels and is an attacker.

Jérôme Truyens is part of the national team that reached the 2008 Summer Olympics in Beijing by ending third at the 2007 European Championship in Manchester. At that 2007 tournament, during the little final Truyens scored the winning goal in the last minute against the German team. In the first game of Belgium at the Olympics in Beijing against Spain, he scored again. However, the Belgian team lost 4–2. Eventually Belgium ended at the ninth place. Also at the 2012 Summer Olympics in London he competed for the national team in the men's tournament, now reaching the fifth place. Truyens became European vice-champion with Belgium at the 2013 European Championship on home ground in Boom.
