= 2018–19 Men's Belgian Hockey League =

Men's Belgian Hockey League
- Season: 2018–19
- Dates: 2 September 2018 – 12 May 2019
- Champions: Léopold (28th title)
- Relegated: Daring; White Star
- Euro Hockey League: Léopold; Beerschot; Herakles
- Matches played: 122
- Goals scored: 736 (6.03 per match)
- Top goalscorer: Tom Boon (38 goals)

The 2018–19 Men's Belgian Hockey League was the 100th season of the Belgian field hockey men's top division. It began on 2 September 2018 and it concluded with the second leg of the championship final on 12 May 2019. Dragons were the defending champions, having won the 2017–18 season.

Léopold won their 28th title by defeating Beerschot 6–5 in aggregate in the championship final (two-legged tie).

== Teams ==
2018–19 Men's Belgian Hockey League teams
Location of Brussels teams in the 2018–19 Men's Belgian Hockey League

Team	Location	Province
Antwerp	Sint-Job-in-'t-Goor	Antwerp
Beerschot	Kontich	Antwerp
Braxgata	Boom	Antwerp
Daring	Molenbeek-Saint-Jean	Brussels
Dragons	Brasschaat	Antwerp
Gantoise	Ghent	East Flanders
Herakles	Lier	Antwerp
Léopold	Uccle	Brussels
Orée	Woluwe-Saint-Pierre	Brussels
Racing	Uccle	Brussels
Waterloo Ducks	Waterloo	Walloon Brabant
White Star	Evere	Brussels

=== Number of teams by provinces ===
Province	Number of teams	Team(s)
Antwerp	5	Antwerp, Beerschot, Braxgata, Dragons, Herakles
Brussels	5	Daring, Léopold, Orée, Racing, White Star
East Flanders	1	Gantoise
Walloon Brabant	1	Waterloo Ducks
Total	14	

== Regular season ==
The twelve teams are grouped in two pools of six (Pool A and Pool B) based on the previous season's ranking :

- Pool A : 1, 4, 5, 8, 9, National 1 (2)
- Pool B : 2, 3, 6, 7, 10, National 1 (1)

The teams of the same pool compete 2 times and face the teams of the other pool once. The first four of each pool are qualified for the play-offs and the last two of each pool play the play-downs.

=== Pool A ===
Pos	Team	Pld	W	D	L	GF	GA	GD	Pts	Qualification or relegation
1	Racing	16	10	6	0	67	30	+37	36	Qualification for the play-offs
2	Orée	16	9	4	3	48	35	+13	31	Qualification for the play-offs
3	Beerschot	16	8	2	6	46	45	+1	26	Qualification for the play-offs
4	Dragons	16	7	2	7	40	35	+5	23	Qualification for the play-offs
5	Braxgata	16	4	4	8	33	39	−6	16	Qualification for the play-downs
6	Antwerp	16	0	2	14	27	71	−44	2	Qualification for the play-downs

=== Pool B ===
Pos	Team	Pld	W	D	L	GF	GA	GD	Pts	Qualification or relegation
1	Waterloo Ducks	16	13	1	2	73	32	+41	40	Qualification for the play-offs
2	Gantoise	16	10	4	2	60	37	+23	34	Qualification for the play-offs
3	Léopold (C)	16	10	2	4	59	32	+27	32	Qualification for the play-offs
4	Herakles	16	4	6	6	42	53	−11	18	Qualification for the play-offs
5	Daring (R)	16	2	2	12	34	66	−32	8	Qualification for the play-downs
6	White Star (R)	16	2	0	14	27	81	−54	6	Qualification for the play-downs

(C) Champions; (R) Relegated

== Play-offs ==
All rounds are played in a two-legged tie. The scheme for the quarter-finals is as follows :

- Series 1: 1A/4B
- Series 2: 2B/3A
- Series 3: 1B/4A
- Series 4: 2A/3B

The semi-finals are played between the winners of series 1 and 2 and the winners of series 3 and 4. The winners qualify for the championship final where the two teams compete to decide who will be crowned Belgian champion.

=== Bracket ===
Quarter-finals
Racing	2	1	3
Herakles (s.o.)	0	3	3
Gantoise	2	0	2
Beerschot	1	2	3
Waterloo Ducks	1	4	5
Dragons	4	2	6
Orée	1	4	5
Léopold	5	3	8

Semi-finals
Herakles	3	2	5
Beerschot	3	4	7
Dragons	2	1	3
Léopold	2	2	4

Final
Beerschot	2	3	5
Léopold	2	4	6
EHL play-off
Herakles (s.o.)	4	2	6
Dragons	5	1	6

=== Quarter-finals ===
==== (1A) Racing vs (4B) Herakles ====
14 April 2019
15:00

Herakles	0-2	Racing
		Boon 12', 51'

28 April 2019
15:00

Racing	1–3	Herakles
Boon 22'		De Kerpel 11', 70'; Haig 64'
Penalties
	1–3

Herakles won series 3-3 (3-1) in aggregate after penalty shoot-out.

==== (2B) Gantoise vs (3A) Beerschot ====
14 April 2019
15:00

Beerschot	1–2	Gantoise
Catlin 70'		Saladino; Tolini 58'

28 April 2019
15:00

Gantoise	0-2	Beerschot
		Duvekot 12'; Bull 17'

Beerschot won series 3-2 in aggregate.

==== (1B) Waterloo Ducks vs (4A) Dragons ====
14 April 2019
15:00

Dragons	4–1	Waterloo Ducks
Raes 32', 46'; Denayer 38' van Aubel 65'		Boccard 54'

28 April 2019
15:00

Waterloo Ducks	4-2	Dragons
Pangrazio 11'; Van Oost 25'; Boccard 40'; Wilbers 57'		Raes 28'; Denayer 53'

Dragons won series 6-5 in aggregate.

==== (2A) Orée vs (3B) Léopold ====
14 April 2019
15:00

Léopold	5–1	Orée
Russell 8', 30', 42'; Zimmer 56'; Degroote 60'		Domene 16'

28 April 2019
15:00

Orée	4-3	Léopold
Domene 35', 40', 43', 56'		Degroote 6'; Russell 52', 54'

Léopold won series 8-5 in aggregate.

=== Semi-finals ===
The semi-finals were played from 1 to 5 May 2019 at Herakles.

==== Herakles vs Beerschot ====
1 May 2019
16:00

Herakles	3–3	Beerschot
Jenness 42'; Keusters 56'; Haig 68'		Catlin 3'; Rossi 38'; Bull 51'

5 May 2019
15:00

Beerschot	4–2	Herakles
Carson 7', 22', 36'; Perez 15'		Hottlet 49'; Haig 63'

Beerschot won series 7–5 in aggregate.

==== Dragons vs Léopold ====
1 May 2019
17:30

Dragons	2–2	Léopold
van Aubel 53'; Willems 56'		Brunet 59', 68'

5 May 2019
15:00

Léopold	2–1	Dragons
Baumgarten 10'; Russell 46'		O'Donoghue 50'

Léopold won series 4–3 in aggregate.

=== EHL play-off ===
The EHL play-off was played from 11 to 12 May 2019 at Herakles. The third place winner is qualified for the 2019–20 Euro Hockey League.

11 May 2019
11:00

Herakles	4–5	Dragons
Haig 1', 57'; Jenness 18'; De Kerpel 68'		Lootens 9'; Uher 13'; Shimmins 17'; Denayer 50'; Raes 51'

12 May 2019
11:00

Dragons	1–2	Herakles
Raes 59'		Haig 5'; Jenness 26'
Penalties
	3–5

Herakles won series 6–6 (5-3) in aggregate after penalty shoot-out.

=== Final ===
The final was played from 11 to 12 May 2019 at Herakles. Both teams are qualified for the 2019–20 Euro Hockey League.

11 May 2019
13:30

Léopold	2–2	Beerschot
Russell 17'; Verdussen 32'		Rossi 5'; Catlin 70'

12 May 2019
13:30

Beerschot	3–4	Léopold
Carson 6', 62'; Verhoeven 41'		Verdussen 33'; Russell 43', 57'; Eaton 52'

Léopold won series 6–5.
