= 2018–19 Feldhockey-Bundesliga =

Bundesliga
- Season: 2018–19
- Dates: 25 August 2018 – 19 May 2019
- Champions: Uhlenhorst Mülheim (18th title)
- Premiers: Uhlenhorst Mülheim
- Relegated: Düsseldorfer HC; Blau-Weiss Berlin
- Euro Hockey League: Uhlenhorst Mülheim; Mannheimer HC; Rot-Weiss Köln
- Matches: 132
- Goals: 687 (5.2 per match)
- Top goalscorer: Timm Herzbruch (29 goals)
- Biggest home win: Uhlenhorst Mülheim 9–2 Club an der Alster (30 March 2019)
- Biggest away win: Blau-Weiss Berlin 0–10 Mannheimer HC (4 May 2019)
- Highest scoring: Düsseldorfer HC 5–6 Nürnberger HTC (22 September 2018)

The 2018–19 Bundesliga was the 77th season of the Bundesliga, Germany's highest field hockey league. It began on 25 August 2019 and it concluded with the championship final on 19 May 2019 in Krefeld.

Uhlenhorst Mülheim were the defending champions, and won their 18th Bundesliga title by defeating Mannheimer HC 5–4 in the final.

== Teams ==
2018–19 Feldhockey-Bundesliga teams
Location of Hamburg teams

Twelve teams competed in the league – the top ten teams from the previous season and the two teams promoted from the 2. Bundesliga. The promoted teams were Hamburger Polo Club and Blau-Weiss Berlin, who replaced TSV Mannheim and Münchner SC.

Team	Location	State
Berliner HC	Berlin	Berlin
Blau-Weiss Berlin	Berlin	Berlin
Club an der Alster	Hamburg	Hamburg
Düsseldorfer HC	Düsseldorf	North Rhine-Westphalia
Hamburger Polo Club	Hamburg	Hamburg
Harvestehuder THC	Hamburg	Hamburg
Mannheimer HC	Mannheim	Baden-Württemberg
Crefelder HTC	Krefeld	North Rhine-Westphalia
Nürnberger HTC	Nuremberg	Bavaria
Rot-Weiss Köln	Cologne	North Rhine-Westphalia
UHC Hamburg	Hamburg	Hamburg
Uhlenhorst Mülheim	Mülheim	North Rhine-Westphalia

=== Number of teams by state ===
State	Number of teams	Clubs
North Rhine-Westphalia	4	Düsseldorfer HC, Crefelder HTC, Rot-Weiss Köln and Uhlenhorst Mülheim
Hamburg	4	Club an der Alster, Hamburger Polo Club, Harvestehuder THC and UHC Hamburg
Berlin	2	Berliner HC and Blau-Weiss Berlin
Baden-Württemberg	1	Mannheimer HC
Bavaria	1	Nürnberger HTC
Total	12	

== Regular season ==
=== League table ===
Pos	Team	Pld	W	D	L	GF	GA	GD	Pts	Qualification or relegation
1	Uhlenhorst Mülheim (C)	22	17	2	3	95	40	+55	53	Qualification for the Euro Hockey League and the play-offs
2	Rot-Weiss Köln	22	15	3	4	82	48	+34	48	Qualification for the Euro Hockey League and the play-offs
3	Mannheimer HC	22	11	8	3	70	31	+39	41	Qualification for the Euro Hockey League and the play-offs
4	UHC Hamburg	22	12	5	5	61	43	+18	41	Qualification for the play-offs
5	Harvestehuder THC	22	11	4	7	60	64	−4	37	
6	Berliner HC	22	8	7	7	59	56	+3	31	
7	Hamburger Polo Club	22	9	3	10	49	55	−6	30	
8	Crefelder HTC	22	8	1	13	45	51	−6	25	
9	Club an der Alster	22	5	8	9	49	62	−13	23	
10	Nürnberger HTC	22	7	2	13	53	68	−15	23	
11	Düsseldorfer HC (R)	22	4	3	15	30	67	−37	15	Relegation to the 2. Bundesliga
12	Blau-Weiss Berlin (R)	22	2	0	20	34	102	−68	6	Relegation to the 2. Bundesliga

Source: TheSports.org
(C) Champions; (R) Relegated

=== Results ===
Home \ Away	BHC	BWB	ALS	CRE	DHC	HPC	HAR	MHC	NÜR	RWK	UHC	UHL
Berliner HC	—	4–1	4–4	5–4	4–1	4–0	2–4	1–1	2–1	5–5	1–1	2–4
Blau-Weiss Berlin	2–3	—	1–2	1–3	2–1	3–6	3–4	0–10	1–4	0–3	2–4	2–8
Club an der Alster	4–6	3–4	—	2–1	1–1	3–2	2–3	3–3	1–2	2–2	1–1	2–3
Crefelder HTC	3–1	8–1	2–1	—	1–2	1–0	3–3	1–3	5–1	0–2	0–3	2–5
Düsseldorfer HC	2–2	3–1	1–5	1–0	—	0–5	2–4	1–4	5–6	1–6	1–0	1–2
Hamburger Polo Club	1–0	4–2	2–2	1–3	2–1	—	3–1	2–2	4–2	2–5	1–5	5–4
Harvestehuder THC	3–2	3–2	2–3	3–1	2–2	3–0	—	0–6	6–5	6–1	3–3	0–4
Mannheimer HC	2–2	6–1	1–1	3–4	6–1	3–2	2–1	—	6–0	3–4	1–1	3–3
Nürnberger HTC	1–1	3–1	2–2	5–1	2–1	5–1	2–4	0–1	—	3–5	4–5	2–4
Rot-Weiss Köln	2–3	7–0	4–2	3–0	2–1	5–3	7–2	1–1	3–1	—	2–4	2–3
UHC Hamburg	4–2	5–3	6–1	2–1	4–1	0–2	3–3	2–1	4–1	2–5	—	1–2
Uhlenhorst Mülheim	6–3	8–1	9–2	3–1	6–0	1–1	6–0	0–2	5–1	4–6	5–1	—

Source: Flashscore
Legend: Blue = home team win; Yellow = draw; Red = away team win.

== Play-offs ==
The championship play-offs were held at the Gerd-Wellen-Hockeystadion in Krefeld on 18 and 19 May 2019.

Semi-finals
18 May – Krefeld
Uhlenhorst Mülheim	5
UHC Hamburg	2
18 May – Krefeld
Rot-Weiss Köln	2
Mannheimer HC	3

Final
19 May – Krefeld
Uhlenhorst Mülheim	5
Mannheimer HC	4

=== Semi-finals ===
18 May 2019
15:30

Uhlenhorst Mülheim	5–2	UHC Hamburg
Panesar 26'; Schiffer 41'; Herzbruch 43', 58'; Brock 51'	Report	Kohl 36'; Teschke 55'

Gerd-Wellen-Hockeystadion, Krefeld

18 May 2019
18:00

Rot-Weiss Köln	2–3	Mannheimer HC
Große 36'; Gomoll 55'	Report	Peillat 28'; Haase 29', 37'

Gerd-Wellen-Hockeystadion, Krefeld

=== Final ===
19 May 2019
15:00

Uhlenhorst Mülheim	5–4	Mannheimer HC
Schiffer 18'; Hellwig 22'; Matania 27', 30'; Meyer 41'	Report	Peillat 16', 38'; Barreiros 17'; Vila 45'

Gerd-Wellen-Hockeystadion, Krefeld

== Statistics ==
=== Top goalscorers ===
As of 12 May 2019

Rank	Player	Club	Goals
1	(Germany) Timm Herzbruch	Uhlenhorst Mülheim	29
2	(Argentina) Gonzalo Peillat	Mannheimer HC	25
3	(Germany) Tom Grambusch	Rot-Weiss Köln	20
3	(Germany) Marco Miltkau	Rot-Weiss Köln	20
5	(Germany) Martin Häner	Berliner HC	19
6	(Austria) Michael Körper	Harvestehuder THC	17
6	(Germany) Lukas Windfeder	Uhlenhorst Mülheim	17
8	(Germany) Peter Kohl	UHC Hamburg	16
9	(Germany) Jonathan Fröschle	Hamburger Polo Club	15
9	(Germany) Justus Weigand	Nürnberger HTC	15
