= Keith M L Yeung =

Hong Kong horse racing jockey (born 1988)

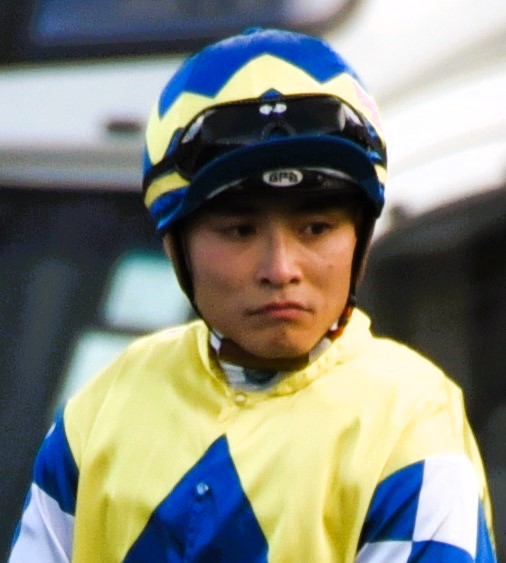
Yeung in 2023

Keith M L Yeung (Chinese: 楊明綸; born 10 April 1988) is a horse racing jockey. He made his first start on 3 June 2007 in Australia and become Hong Kong's champion apprentice in 2009/10. In 2010/11 he partnered 18 winners for a Hong Kong career total of 57. In the 2012/13 season he rode 22 winners and in an injury interrupted 2013/14 season he scored 16 wins for an overall total of 132 HK wins.

== Performance ==
Seasons	Total Rides	No. of Wins	No. of 2nds	No. of 3rds	No. of 4ths	Stakes won
2008-2009	254	9	19	29	20	HK$10,252,075
2009-2010	390	30	28	26	32	HK$22,548,950
2010-2011	420	18	29	33	40	HK$19,586,775
2011-2012	500	37	26	40	39	HK$28,967,812
2012-2013	339	22	20	32	32	HK$21,359,100
2013-2014	243	16	13	17	13	HK$14,732,750
2014-2015	490	28	27	37	34	HK$29,132,300
2015-2016	514	30	28	33	43	HK$31,057,312
2016-2017	390	15	23	21	25	HK$18,949,925
2017-2018	461	23	17	25	34	HK$25,206,850
2018-2019	444	19	24	31	29	HK$27,030,275
2019-2020	418	8	15	16	24	HK$16,150,280
2020-2021	441	9	15	17	22	HK$
2021-2022	339	11	18	19	23	HK$
2022-2023	309	11	16	18	18	HK$
2023-2024	348	18	20	21	23	HK$27,293,950
2024-2025	434	20	25	27	31	HK$31,339,175
