= 2019–20 Men's Euro Hockey League =

2019–20 Euro Hockey League
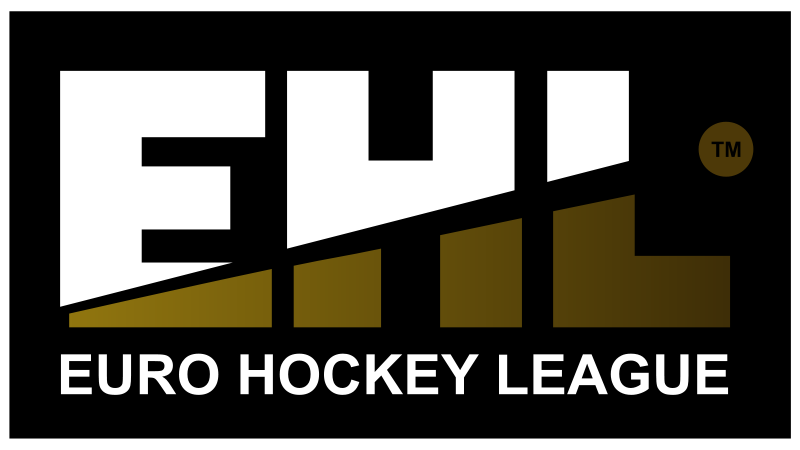

Tournament details
- Dates: 4 October 2019 – 13 April 2020
- Teams: 20 (from 11 associations)
- Venue: 2 (in 2 host cities)

Tournament statistics
- Matches played: 16
- Goals scored: 91 (5.69 per match)
- Top scorer: (Scotland) Alan Forsyth (5 goals)

The 2019–20 Euro Hockey League was the 13th season of the Euro Hockey League, Europe's premier club field hockey tournament, organized by the European Hockey Federation. The Knockout 16 was held in Barcelona in October 2019 and the Final 8 was originally scheduled to be held in Amstelveen in April 2020.

Waterloo Ducks were the defending champions but they failed to qualify for this year's edition.

Due to the COVID-19 pandemic in Europe the Final 8 was put on hold. On 12 May 2020, it was announced that the Final 8 was postponed to October 2020. The Final 8 was officially cancelled on 14 August 2020.

== Association team allocation ==
Location of teams in 2019–20 Euro Hockey League
Location of Benelux teams in 2019–20 Euro Hockey League

A total of 20 teams from 11 of the 45 EHF member associations participated in the 2019–20 Euro Hockey League. The association ranking based on the EHL country coefficients is used to determine the number of participating teams for each association:

- Associations 1–3 each have three teams qualify.
- Associations 4–6 each have two teams qualify.
- Associations 7–11 each have one team qualify.

=== Association ranking ===
For the 2019–20 Euro Hockey League, the associations are allocated places according to their 2019 EHL country coefficients, which takes into account their performance in the Euro Hockey League and the EuroHockey Club Trophy from 2016–17 to 2018–19.

Association ranking for 2019–20 Euro Hockey League
Rank	Change	Association	Points	Teams
1	▲1	Germany	40.833	3
2	▲1	Belgium	38.583	3
3	▼2	Netherlands	38.500	3
4	Steady	Spain	29.917	2
5	▲1	England	22.625	2
6	▼1	France	20.875	2
7	Steady	Russia	19.000	1
8	Steady	Scotland	18.375	1
9	Steady	Ireland	16.500	1
10	▲2	Belarus	15.875	1
11	Steady	Austria	14.375	1
12	▲2	Wales	11.000	0
13	▼3	Poland	10.625	0
14	▼1	Switzerland	9.625	0
15	Steady	Ukraine	7.750	0
16	New entry	Portugal	3.000	0
17	Steady	Czech Republic	2.500	0
18	▼2	Italy	2.375	0

=== Teams ===
League positions of the previous season shown in parentheses (RS: Regular season winners).

Final 8
(Germany) Uhlenhorst Mülheim (1st)	(Netherlands) Bloemendaal (1st)
(Belgium) Léopold (1st)	(Spain) Club Egara (1st)
Knockout 16
(Germany) Mannheimer HC (2nd)	(England) Surbiton (RS)
(Germany) Rot-Weiss Köln (3rd)	(France) Saint Germain (1st)
(Belgium) Beerschot (2nd)	(France) Montrouge (2nd)
(Belgium) Herakles (3rd)	(Russia) Dinamo Kazan (1st)
(Netherlands) Kampong (2nd)	(Scotland) Grange (1st)
(Netherlands) HGC (3rd)	(Ireland) Three Rock Rovers (1st)
(Spain) Real Club de Polo (RS)	(Belarus) Minsk (1st)
(England) Hampstead & Westminster (1st)	(Austria) Arminen (1st)

== Format changes ==
For the 2019–20 season the EHL moved to a new format with the removal of the round-robin tournament in round one. Instead, a knock-out format will be used from the start of the tournament. Round one was replaced by the knockout 16 with four sides advancing to the quarter-finals, or Final 8 as it's called, on Easter. The Final 8 will consist of the champions from the top four nations on the EHL rankings table alongside the four sides that qualified from the knockout 16. This means that instead of a total of 24 teams from 12 associations there were 20 teams from 11 associations.

== Knockout 16 ==
The Knockout 16 was held at the Pau Negre Stadium in Barcelona, Spain from 4 to 6 October 2019. The draw took place on 18 July 2019. The four winners from the knockout 8 advance to the Final 8 in April 2020.

=== Bracket ===
Knockout 16
4 October
(Germany) Mannheimer HC	6
(France) Montrouge	0
4 October
(Netherlands) HGC	1
(England) Hampstead	2
4 October
(Russia) Dinamo Kazan	4
(France) Saint Germain	2
4 October
(England) Surbiton	5
(Spain) Real Club de Polo	2
5 October
(Scotland) Grange	0
(Ireland) Three Rock Rovers	5
5 October
(Germany) Rot-Weiss Köln	3
(Belgium) Beerschot	1
5 October
(Netherlands) Kampong	8
(Belarus) Minsk	1
5 October
(Belgium) Herakles	10
(Austria) Arminen	0

Knockout 8
6 October
(Germany) Mannheimer HC	2
(England) Hampstead	1
6 October
(Russia) Dinamo Kazan	1
(England) Surbiton	4
6 October
(Ireland) Three Rock Rovers	2
(Germany) Rot-Weiss Köln	4
6 October
(Netherlands) Kampong	6
(Belgium) Herakles	0

=== Knockout 16 ===
4 October 2019
11:5

Mannheimer HC (Germany)	6–0	(France) Montrouge
Peillat 11', 35'; Weigand 17', 49'; Vila 26'; Schües 40'	Report

Pau Negre Stadium, Barcelona
Umpires:
Ivona Makar (CRO)
Michiel Otten (NED)

4 October 2019
13:30

HGC (Netherlands)	1–2	(England) Hampstead & Westminster
Van Ass 56'	Report	Guise-Brown 12'; Smith 40'

Pau Negre Stadium, Barcelona
Umpires:
Tim Meissner (GER)
Mikhail Golovanov (RUS)

4 October 2019
15:45

Dinamo Kazan (Russia)	4–2	(France) Saint Germain
Gilev 9'; Kornilov 16', 49'; Iankun 42'	Report	Jouin 57'; Goyet 58'

Pau Negre Stadium, Barcelona
Umpires:
Vincenzo Antonio Ilgrande (ITA)
Luka Zupancic (AUT)

4 October 2019
18:00

Surbiton (England)	5–2	(Spain) Real Club de Polo
Forsyth 6', 33', 54'; Taylor 10', 47'	Report	Cabot 7'; Ruiz 34'

Pau Negre Stadium, Barcelona
Umpires:
Xavier Fenaert (FRA)
Michael Dutrieux (BEL)

5 October 2019
09:45

Grange (Scotland)	0–5	(Ireland) Three Rock Rovers
	Report	Hosking 9'; Grace 29'; B. Walker 37'; J. Walker 42'; Empey 53'

Pau Negre Stadium, Barcelona
Umpires:
Andres Ortiz (ESP)
Ivona Makar (CRO)

5 October 2019
12:00

Rot-Weiss Köln (Germany)	3–1	(Belgium) Beerschot
Gomoll 43'; Rühr 51', 59'	Report	De Sloover 49'

Pau Negre Stadium, Barcelona
Umpires:
Jakub Mejzlik (CZE)
Michiel Otten (NED)

5 October 2019
14:15

Herakles (Belgium)	10–0	(Austria) Arminen
Amorosini 6'; Keusters 8'; Arana 9', 20'; Hottlet 28'; De Kerpel 34'; Haig 40'; Van Stratum 42', 44'; Puglisi 53'	Report

Pau Negre Stadium, Barcelona
Umpires:
Sarah Wilson (SCO)
Tim Meissner (GER)

5 October 2019
16:30

Kampong (Netherlands)	8–1	(Belarus) Minsk
Janssen 1'; Pieters 2', 32'; Kellerman 6', 18', 48'; Kemperman 29'; Phijffer 60'	Report	Hancharou 60'

Pau Negre Stadium, Barcelona
Umpires:
Paul Walker (ENG)
Xavier Fenaert (FRA)

=== Ranking matches ===
5 October 2019
11:45

Montrouge (France)	0–3	(Netherlands) HGC
	Report	Walmiki 24'; Harjeet 29'; Vis 59'

Pau Negre Stadium, Barcelona
Umpires:
Michael Dutrieux (BEL)
Vincenzo Antonio Ilgrande (ITA)

5 October 2019
16:15

Saint Germain (France)	1–5	(Spain) Real Club de Polo
W.I. Jeammot 32'	Report	Llorens 6'; Borras 9'; A. Reyne 14'; Zaldua 19'; Alegre 26'

Pau Negre Stadium, Barcelona
Umpires:
Mikhail Golovanov (RUS)
Luka Zupancic (AUT)

6 October 2019
11:45

Grange (Scotland)	1–7	(Belgium) Beerschot
Nairn 55'	Report	De Sloover 4', 39', 53'; Catlin 24'; Carson 26'; Perez 27'; Duvekot 60'

Pau Negre Stadium, Barcelona
Umpires:
Luka Zupancic (AUT)
Xavier Fenaert (FRA)

6 October 2019
16:15

Minsk (Belarus)	1–3	(Austria) Arminen
Luppa 60'	Report	Ph. Schmidt 19'; Klimon 21'; Eitenberger 30'

Pau Negre Stadium, Barcelona
Umpires:
Mikhal Golovanov (RUS)
Vincenzo Antonio Ilgrance (ITA)

=== Knockout 8 ===
6 October 2019
09:45

Mannheimer HC (Germany)	2–1	(England) Hampstead & Westminster
Knisel 15'; Peillat 47'	Report	Guise-Brown 39'

Pau Negre Stadium, Barcelona
Umpires:
Jakub Mejzlik (CZE)
Andres Ortiz (ESP)

6 October 2019
12:00

Three Rock Rovers (Ireland)	2–4	(Germany) Rot-Weiss Köln
B. Walker 31'; Canning 39'	Report	M. Grambusch 4'; Flekchaus 19'; T. Grambusch 37'; Rühr 59'

Pau Negre Stadium, Barcelona
Umpires:
Ivona Makar (CRO)
Michael Dutrieux (BEL)

6 October 2019
14:15

Kampong (Netherlands)	6–0	(Belgium) Herakles
Janssen 1', 17'; Phijffer 16', 31'; Havenga 39'; Kellerman 45'	Report

Pau Negre Stadium, Barcelona
Umpires:
Paul Walker (ENG)
Sarah Wilson (SCO)

6 October 2019
16:30

Dinamo Kazan (Russia)	1–4	(England) Surbiton
Fattakhov 12'	Report	Royce 32'; Forsyth 40', 54'; Sorsby 42'

Pau Negre Stadium, Barcelona
Umpires:
Tim Meissner (GER)
Michiel Otten (NED)

== Final 8 ==
The Final 8 was originally scheduled to be held at the Wagener Stadium in Amstelveen, Netherlands from 9 to 13 April 2020. The draw took place on 18 October 2019. On 12 May 2020, it was announced that the Final 8 was postponed to be held from 14 to 18 October 2020. The Final 8 was officially cancelled on 14 August 2020.

== Statistics ==
As of 6 October 2019

=== Top goalscorers ===
Rank	Player	Team	FG	PC	PS	Goals
1	(Scotland) Alan Forsyth	(England) Surbiton	3	1	1	5
2	(Netherlands) Bjorn Kellerman	(Netherlands) Kampong	4	0	0	4
2	(Belgium) Arthur De Sloover	(Belgium) Beerschot	0	4	0	4
4	(Netherlands) Boet Phijffer	(Netherlands) Kampong	2	1	0	3
4	(Netherlands) Jip Janssen	(Netherlands) Kampong	0	3	0	3
4	(Argentina) Gonzalo Peillat	(Germany) Mannheimer HC	0	3	0	3
4	(Germany) Christopher Rühr	(Germany) Rot-Weiss Köln	0	1	2	3
8	(Spain) Diego Arana	(Belgium) Herakles	2	0	0	2
8	(Russia) Anton Kornilov	(Russia) Dinamo Kazan	2	0	0	2
8	(Netherlands) Terrance Pieters	(Netherlands) Kampong	2	0	0	2
8	(Belgium) Anthony Van Stratum	(Belgium) Herakles	2	0	0	2
8	(Germany) Justus Weigand	(Germany) Mannheimer HC	2	0	0	2
8	(South Africa) Matt Guise-Brown	(England) Hampstead	0	2	0	2
8	(England) Luke Taylor	(England) Surbiton	0	2	0	2
8	(Ireland) Benjamin Walker	(Ireland) Three Rock Rovers	0	2	0	2

== See also ==
- 2020 Euro Hockey League Women
- 2020 Men's EuroHockey Club Trophy I
- 2020 Men's EuroHockey Indoor Club Cup
