= 2020 Men's EuroHockey Club Trophy I =

Cancelled field hockey tournament

Tournament details
- Host country: Austria
- City: Vienna
- Dates: Cancelled
- Teams: 8 (from 8 associations)
- Venue(s): Post SV Wien

The 2020 Men's EuroHockey Club Trophy I would have been the 44th edition of the EuroHockey Club Trophy I, Europe's secondary men's club field hockey tournament organized by the European Hockey Federation and the first edition since it was renamed from the EuroHockey Club Trophy. It would be held in Vienna, Austria from 29 May to 1 June 2020.

The tournament was canceled on 23 March 2020 due to the COVID-19 pandemic.

== Qualified teams ==
- (Wales) Cardiff & Met
- (Russia) Dinamo Elektrostal
- (Scotland) Grove Menzieshill
- (Poland) Grunwald Poznań
- (Ukraine) OKS Vinnitsa
- (Austria) Post SV
- (Switzerland) Rotweiss Wettingen
- (Belarus) Stroitel Brest

== See also ==
- 2019–20 Euro Hockey League
- 2020 Men's EuroHockey Club Trophy II
