= 2020 Men's EuroHockey Club Trophy II =

Cancelled field hockey tournament

Tournament details
- Host country: Northern Ireland
- City: Lisburn
- Dates: 28–31 May
- Teams: 8 (from 7 associations)
- Venue(s): Lisnagarvey Hockey Club

The 2020 Men's EuroHockey Club Trophy II would have been the first edition of the EuroHockey Club Trophy II, Europe's tertiary men's club field hockey tournament organized by the European Hockey Federation. It would be held in Lisburn, Northern Ireland from 28 to 31 May 2020.

The tournament was canceled on 23 March 2020 due to the COVID-19 pandemic.

== Qualified teams ==
- (Italy) Paolo Bonomi
- (Portugal) Casa Pia
- (Italy) Bra
- (Ireland) Lisnagarvey
- (Denmark) Slagelse
- (Czech Republic) Plzeň-Litice
- (Wales) Whitchurch
- (Croatia) Zelina

== See also ==
- 2020 Men's EuroHockey Club Trophy I
