= 2020 Boys' EuroHockey U18 Championship =

Cancelled field hockey tournament

2020 Boys' EuroHockey Youth Championships
Tournament details
- Host country: Russia
- City: Kazan
- Dates: 12–18 July
- Teams: 8 (from 1 confederation)

The 2020 Boys' EuroHockey Youth Championships was scheduled to be the 11th edition of the Boys' EuroHockey Youth Championship, the biennial international boys' under-18 field hockey championship of Europe organized by the European Hockey Federation. It was scheduled to be held alongside the women's tournament in Kazan, Russia from 12 to 18 July 2020.

The tournament was canceled on 31 March 2020 due to the COVID-19 pandemic in Europe.

== Qualified teams ==
Dates	Event	Location	Quotas	Qualifiers
15–21 July 2018	2018 EuroHockey Youth Championship	Santander, Spain	6	Belgium; England; Germany; Ireland; Netherlands; Spain
22–28 July 2018	2018 EuroHockey Youth Championship II	Cardiff, Wales	2	Russia; Scotland
Total			8	

== See also ==
- 2020 Girls' EuroHockey Youth Championships
