= 2020 Girls' EuroHockey U18 Championship =

Cancelled field hockey tournament

Tournament details
- Host country: Russia
- City: Kazan
- Dates: 12–18 July
- Teams: 8 (from 1 confederation)
- Venue(s): Centre field hockey

The 2020 Girls' EuroHockey U18 Championship was scheduled to be the 11th edition of the Girls' EuroHockey U18 Championship. The tournament was scheduled to be held alongside the men's tournament from 12 to 18 July 2020 in Kazan, Russia.

The tournament was canceled on 31 March 2020 due to the COVID-19 pandemic in Europe.

== Qualified teams ==
The following teams have qualified for the 2020 EuroHockey U18 Championship:

Dates	Event	Location	Quotas	Qualifiers
15–21 July 2018	2018 EuroHockey Youth Championship	Santander, Spain	6	Belgium; England; Germany; Ireland; Netherlands; Spain
15–21 July 2018	2018 EuroHockey Youth Championship II	Rakovník, Czech Republic	2	Scotland; Russia
Total			8	
