= 2020 English Greyhound Derby =

Greyhound racing event

- Location: Nottingham Greyhound Stadium
- Start date: 2 October
- End date: 31 October
- Total prize money: £50,000 (winner)

The 2020 Star Sports and ARC Greyhound Derby took place during October 2020, with the final being held on 31 October 2020 at Nottingham Greyhound Stadium. The event was rescheduled following the original May event postponement due to the COVID-19 pandemic.

It was the second time that the event had been held in Nottingham and was sponsored by Star Sports and ARC. The dates of the competition were originally set as: First round (10/11 April), Second round (17/18 April), Third round (25 April), Quarter-finals (2 May), Semi-finals (9 May) and final (16 May). The revised dates for a reduced event (96 runners only and one less round) were First round (2/3 October), Second round (10 October), Quarter-finals (17 October), Semi-finals (24 October) and final (31 October). The 96 runners were selected from 130 entries which resulted in the unusual situation where there were 34 reserves on standby.

The competition was dominated by the Irish entry with four greyhounds making the final for the second year in a row, in the history of the competition this had only happened twice before (2016 and 2019). The final was won by Irish runner Deerjet Sydney trained by Pat Buckley, owned by Kenny Glen and bred by Eileen Lingane. The final contained two full litter brothers (the winner Deerjet Sydney and Smurfs Machine) and a half sister (Coolavanny Chick).

== Final result ==
At Nottingham (over 500 metres): Winner £50,000

Pos	Name of Greyhound	Breeding	Trap	Sectional	Race comment	SP	Time	Trainer
1st	Deerjet Sydney	Droopys Sydney - Madgies Wish	2	4.91	EarlyPace, AlwaysLed	11-4	29.38	Pat Buckley (Ireland)
2nd	Ballydoyle Valor	Kinloch Brae - Fear Emoski	3	5.06	CrowdedRunUp	10-1	29.44	Graham Holland (Ireland)
3rd	Coolavanny Chick	Droopys Sydney - Toms Delight	6	5.05	ClearRun, Wide	13-2	29.68	Noel Hehir (Ireland)
4th	Smurfs Machine	Droopys Sydney - Madgies Wish	5	5.02	ClearRun, Middle	9-1	30.08	Seamus Cahill (Brighton)
5th	Southwood Jet	Droopys Jet - Luminous Queen	1	5.12	SlowAway, CrowdedRunUp	7-4f	30.22	Richard Rees (Brighton)
6th	Wolfe	Tyrur Big Mike - Jalingo	4	5.10	CrowdedRunUp&1, Ck2	10-3	00.00	Graham Holland (Ireland)

=== Final distances ===
¾, 3, 5, 1¾, Dis (lengths) 0.08 sec = one length

=== Final report ===
Deerjet Sydney broke extremely well and recorded a 4.91 sectional which resulted in an all the way win. An even break behind resulted in the Graham Holland runners being crowded on the run up and favourite Southwood Jet chose the final to record his worst start in the competition. Smurfs Machine was nicely placed in second but faded while Ballydoyle Valor made up ground on the leader to finish second with Coolavanny Chick third. Wolfe checked at the second bend and suffered ligament damage which resulted in his trainer stating that he would be retired.

== Quarter-finals ==
Heat 1 (17 October, £1,000)
Pos	Name	SP	Time
1st	Wolfe	9-4	29.47
2nd	Coolavanny Chick	1-1f	29.63
3rd	Deanridge Rapid	9-1	30.11
4th	Wingman	12-1	30.14
5th	Newinn Jacko	11-1	30.15
6th	Antigua Boy	15-2	30.39

Heat 2 (17 October, £1,000)
Pos	Name	SP	Time
1st	Southwood Jet	7-4f	29.54
2nd	Troy Firebird	3-1	29.64
3rd	Lenson Whelan	16-1	29.88
4th	Lenson Bocko	10-3	30.18
5th	Blue Tick George	7-2	30.19
6th	Final Mad	16-1	30.49

Heat 3 (17 October, £1,000)
Pos	Name	SP	Time
1st	Smurfs Machine	9-1	29.49
2nd	Churchill Holly	10-3	29.69
3rd	Ballydoyle Valor	2-1f	29.83
4th	Amka Rofe	18-1	30.01
5th	Swift Lettuce	7-2	30.31
6th	Swanley Chick	3-1	30.37

Heat 4 (17 October, £1,000)
Pos	Name	SP	Time
1st	Knockaboul Syd	9-4	29.49
2nd	Deerjet Sydney	5-4f	29.53
3rd	Distant Village	12-1	29.81
4th	Kilara Icon	20-1	29.85
5th	Glengar Bale	11-4	30.25
6th	Rockmount Ozzy	22-1	30.65

== Semi-finals ==
First Semi-final (24 October, £2,500)
Pos	Name of Greyhound	SP	Time	Trainer
1st	Southwood Jet	7-4	29.97	Richard Rees
2nd	Ballydoyle Valor	11-1	30.09	Graham Holland
3rd	Coolavanny Chick	4-1	30.29	Noel Hehir
4th	Distant Village	11-1	30.35	Matt Dartnall
5th	Deanridge Rapid	18-1	30.69	Alison Kelly-Pilgrim
6th	Knockaboul Syd	6-4f	30.70	Pat Buckley

Second Semi-final (24 October, £2,500)
Pos	Name of greyhound	SP	Time	Trainer
1st	Wolfe	3-1	29.96	Graham Holland
2nd	Deerjet Sydney	15-8f	30.14	Pat Buckley
3rd	Smurfs Machine	7-2	30,.17	Seamus Cahill
4th	Lenson Whelan	33-1	30.39	Patrick Janssens
5th	Troy Firebird	5-1	30.85	David Mullins
6th	Churchill Holly	5-1	31.09	Lynn Cook

== Competition review ==
The event attracted 130 entries, which was as expected significantly down on the previous year due to the COVID-19 problems. However, there were still 19 Irish entries and some of these topped the ante post betting list; Graham Holland's Newinn Session was the 10-1 favourite with 2019 Irish Greyhound Derby Champion Lenson Bocko next at 16–1, a price matched by the top English entry Bockos Doomie (Puppy Derby and Sussex Cup champion). Other leading entries included Wolfe, Black Parachute, Kilara Lion and Smallmead. Notable absences included defending champion Priceless Blake and the recently retired Ice on Fire. The feeling around the event was the uncertainty of what might happen, the Irish hounds that had travelled had the current form on their cards which indicated another Irish victory but the year had been disrupted to such a degree that many had no idea of the capabilities of the British entry in the premier event.

The first round got underway on Friday 2 October with 8 heats in very wet weather making the track slow. The first heat went to the Irish as Deerjet Sydney (Buckley) won in 29.83 but Irish hope Black Parachute was eliminated in heat 2. Pat Buckley won his second heat when Glengar Bale impressed in 29.55 but Kilara Lion failed to progress. Ladbrokes Gold Cup champion Gonzo won heat 5 before Knockaboul Syd won a third heat for Buckley in a fast 29.66. The final heat went to the Gary Carmichael trained Little Emir in 29.62 but big favourite Roxholme Kristof was knocked out. Little Emir was disqualified from the competition on 9 October after returning a positive sample taken after the race. Continual heavy rain resulted in extraordinary conditions the following night on a track rated at 130 (1.30 seconds) slow in places but the Irish stamped their authority on the competition. Graham Holland produced three winners in Wolfe, Ballydoyle Valor and Newinn Session and Buckley had a fourth first round winner with Doolin Duke and Noel Hehir's Coolavanny Chick made it eight Irish winners out of the 16 heats. The conditions made it impossible to assess the times and those qualifying did well to progress with greyhounds kicking up wet sand in front of them. Other notable names to progress included Lenson Bocko, Bockos Doomie and Kilara Icon.

The second round was once again dominated by the Irish with Pat Buckley training another treble with runners well backed off course. Knockaboul Syd won the first heat in a fast 29.29, from Swift Lettuce and Lenson Bocko but favourite Newinn Session was eliminated. Ballydoyle Valor won heat two followed by an English win by Southwood Jet. Deerjet Sydney recorded an impressive 29.15 winning heat four and Coolavanny Chick took the next heat which saw the challenges of both Doolin Duke and Feudal Spirit come to an end. The John Mullins trained Rockmount Ozzy provided a huge shock in heat six when winning at odds of 40–1 with Wolfe scraping through in third place. Buckley's third success was with Glengar Bale who battled with Churchill Holly for the win in heat seven where Bockos Doomie was eliminated. The eighth and final heat saw a sixth Irish success of the night when Swanley Chick won but Gonzo failed to progress. No less than six unbeaten greyhounds went into the quarter-final draw.

The quarter final draw was unfortunate for Pat Buckley because all three of his remaining charges were drawn in the fourth and final heat which looked the strongest on paper. The first heat resulted in a win for Wolfe who won in 29.47 defeating Coolavanny Chick by 2 lengths and making amends for his early exit the previous year. Heat two went to Southwood Jet trained by Richard Rees and the blue dog remained unbeaten but Lenson Bocko was eliminated in the same heat. Smurfs Machine won the third heat which saw favourite Ballydoyle Valor qualify in third place. The fourth and final heat ended in a 1-2 finish for Buckley with Knockaboul Syd and Deerjet Sydney but his third runner Glengar Bale was eliminated along with Kilara Icon.

Two hounds, Southwood Jet and Knockaboul Syd remained unbeaten going into the semi-finals but the event was wide open following all four quarter finals being won within 7 spots of each other. Southwood Jet duly won the first semi final and would go into the final as the only unbeaten greyhound in the competition, he led all the way on another very wet night which resulted in slow times once again. Ballydoyle Valor ran well to finish second and Coolavanny Chick took third but favourite Knockaboul Syd finished last after encountering trouble at the second bend. An Irish 1–2 in the second semi final (Wolfe from Deerjey Sydney) meant that four Irish hounds would make the final for the second year in succession. Smurfs Machine took the remaining qualifying spot for the 2020 Derby final.

== See also ==
- 2020 UK & Ireland Greyhound Racing Year
