= 2011–12 Euro Hockey League =

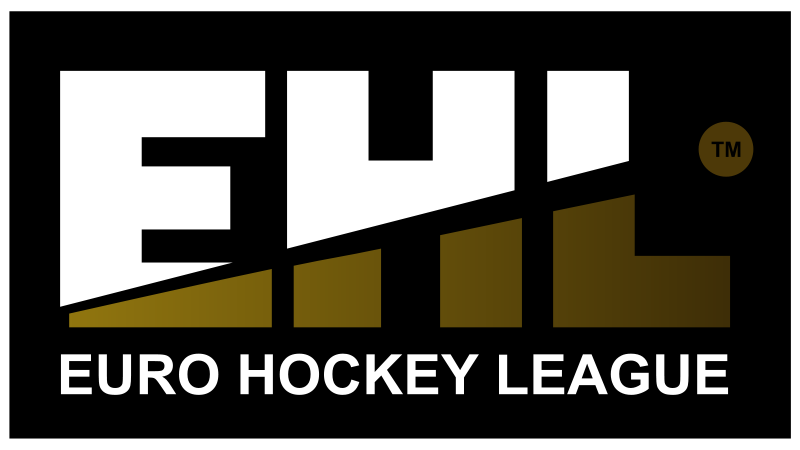

Tournament details
- Dates: 7 October 2011 – 27 May 2012
- Teams: 24
- Venue: 4 (in 4 host cities)

Final positions
- Champions: (Germany) UHC Hamburg (3rd title)
- Runner-up: (Netherlands) Amsterdam
- Third place: (Belgium) Dragons

Tournament statistics
- Matches played: 40
- Goals scored: 224 (5.6 per match)
- Top scorer(s): (Netherlands) Mirco Pruyser (Netherlands) Roderick Weusthof (8 goals)
- Best player: (Germany) Nicolas Jacobi

The 2011–12 Euro Hockey League was the fifth season of the Euro Hockey League, Europe's premier club field hockey tournament organized by the EHF. It was held at four different locations from October 2011 to May 2012.

The final was played between Hamburg and Amsterdam at the Wagener Stadium in Amstelveen, Netherlands. Hamburg defeated Amsterdam 2–1 on penalty strokes (2–2 after extra time) to win a record third title. HGC were the defending champions, but they did not qualify for this season's edition.

== Association team allocation ==
Location of teams in 2011–12 Euro Hockey League.
Pink: Group A; Green: Group B; Deep Pink: Group C; Yellow: Group D;
Red: Group E; Cyan: Group F; Blue: Group G; Purple: Group H
Location of Benelux teams in 2011–12 Euro Hockey League

A total of 24 teams from 12 of the 45 EHF member associations participated in the 2011–12 Euro Hockey League. The association ranking based on the EHL country coefficients is used to determine the number of participating teams for each association:

- Associations 1–4 each have three teams qualify.
- Associations 5–8 each have two teams qualify.
- Associations 9–12 each have one team qualify.

=== Teams ===
Champions
(Netherlands) Amsterdam	(Belgium) Dragons	(France) Montrogue
(Spain) Atlètic Terrassa	(Ireland) Banbridge	(Austria) AHTC Wien
(England) Beeston	(Poland) Grunwald Poznań	(Ukraine) Olympia Kolos Sekvoia
(Germany) Club an der Alster	(Russia) Dinamo Kazan	(Switzerland) Rotweiss Wettingen
Runners-up		Third placed
(Netherlands) Bloemendaal	(Belgium) Racing Bruxelles	(Netherlands) Rotterdam
(Spain) Club de Campo	(Ireland) Cookstown	(Spain) Real Club de Polo
(England) East Grinstead	(Poland) Pomorzanin Torún	(England) Reading
(Germany) Uhlenhorst Mülheim	(Russia) Dinamo Elektrostal	(Germany) UHC Hamburg

== Round One ==
The 24 teams were drawn into eight pools of three. In each pool, teams played against each other once in a round-robin format. The pool winners and runners-up advanced to the round of 16. Pools A, D, E, and F were played in Brasschaat, Belgium from 21 to 23 October 2011 and the other pools were played in Mülheim, Germany. If a game was won, the winning team received 5 points. A draw resulted in both teams receiving 2 points. A loss gave the losing team 1 point unless the losing team lost by 3 or more goals, then they received 0 points.

=== Pool A ===
Pos	Team	Pld	W	D	L	GF	GA	GD	Pts	Qualification
1	(Netherlands) Amsterdam	2	2	0	0	12	2	+10	10	Advance to knockout stage
2	(England) Reading	2	1	0	1	6	2	+4	6	Advance to knockout stage
3	(Ireland) Cookstown	2	0	0	2	1	15	−14	0	

Source: EHF

21 October 2011

Reading (England)	5–0	(Ireland) Cookstown
R. Mantell 16', 20'; Watts 45', 59', 66'	Report

The Mansion of Dragons, Brasschaat
Umpires:
Mike Gerwig (GER)
Gregory Uyttenhove (BEL)

22 October 2011

Cookstown (Ireland)	1–10	(Netherlands) Amsterdam
Cuddy 43'	Report	Evers 3', 10', 31'; Pruyser 5', 47', 51', 62', 65'; Ebbers 55'; Verga 69'

The Mansion of Dragons, Brasschaat
Umpires:
Andrew Kennedy (ENG)
Michal Margolien (SVK)

23 October 2011

Amsterdam (Netherlands)	2–1	(England) Reading
Tigges 9'; Taekema 66'	Report	S. Mantell 48'

The Mansion of Dragons, Brasschaat
Umpires:
Mike Gerwig (GER)
Juan Manuel Requena (ESP)

=== Pool B ===
Pos	Team	Pld	W	D	L	GF	GA	GD	Pts	Qualification
1	(Germany) Uhlenhorst Mülheim (H)	2	2	0	0	7	3	+4	10	Advance to knockout stage
2	(Spain) Atlètic Terrassa	2	1	0	1	5	6	−1	6	Advance to knockout stage
3	(Austria) AHTC Wien	2	0	0	2	3	6	−3	2	

Source: EHF
(H) Hosts

7 October 2011
17:00

Uhlenhorst Mülheim (Germany)	3–1	(Austria) AHTC Wien
Fleckhaus 8'; Stralkowski 29'; Keusgen 55'	Report	Stremitzer 31'

Waldstadion, Mülheim
Umpires:
Thomas Lingg (SUI)
Coen van Bunge (NED)

8 October 2011
14:30

AHTC Wien (Austria)	2–3	(Spain) Atlètic Terrassa
Gerö 6'; Schmidt 59'	Report	I. Freixa 9', 30'; Guerrero 67'

Waldstadion, Mülheim
Umpires:
Coen van Bunge (NED)
Dan Barstow (ENG)

9 October 2011
14:30

Atlètic Terrassa (Spain)	2–4	(Germany) Uhlenhorst Mülheim
Oliva 38'; Beltran 67'	Report	Schmitz 4'; Stralkowski 39'; Fleckhaus 45'; Rabente 53'

Waldstadion, Mülheim
Umpires:
Coen van Bunge (NED)
Francesco Parisi (ITA)

=== Pool C ===
Pos	Team	Pld	W	D	L	GF	GA	GD	Pts	Qualification
1	(England) Beeston	2	2	0	0	8	1	+7	10	Advance to knockout stage
2	(Spain) Real Club de Polo	2	1	0	1	3	3	0	6	Advance to knockout stage
3	(Poland) Pomorzanin Torún	2	0	0	2	0	7	−7	1	

Source: EHF

7 October 2011
12:00

Beeston (England)	5–0	(Poland) Pomorzanin Torún
Dixon 6'; Jones 9'; Scanlon 27'; Schmidt 39'; Beckers 52'	Report

Waldstadion, Mülheim
Umpires:
Nathan Stagno (GIB)
Mikael Mattsson (SWE)

8 October 2011
12:00

Pomorzanin Torún (Poland)	0–2	(Spain) Real Club de Polo
	Report	Padrós 59'; Dabanch 70'

Waldstadion, Mülheim
Umpires:
Daniel Clarke (IRL)
Thomas Lingg (SUI)

9 October 2011
12:00

Real Club de Polo (Spain)	1–3	(England) Beeston
Dabanch 31'	Report	Ames 6'; O.G. 51'; Beckers 59'

Waldstadion, Mülheim
Umpires:
Christian Blasch (GER)
Benjamin Mauss (FRA)

=== Pool D ===
Pos	Team	Pld	W	D	L	GF	GA	GD	Pts	Qualification
1	(Germany) Club an der Alster	2	1	1	0	7	6	+1	7	Advance to knockout stage
2	(Spain) Club de Campo	2	1	0	1	5	2	+3	6	Advance to knockout stage
3	(Belgium) Racing Bruxelles	2	0	1	1	5	9	−4	2	

Source: EHF

21 October 2011
18:00

Racing Bruxelles (Belgium)	5–5	(Germany) Club an der Alster
Boon 5', 35', 61', 63', 68'	Report	P. Fröschle 11', 28', 43'; J. Fröschle 19'; Witte 55'

The Mansion of Dragons, Brasschaat
Umpires:
Michiel Brüning (NED)
Andrew Mair (SCO)

22 October 2011
18:15

Club an der Alster (Germany)	2–1	(Spain) Club de Campo
D. von Drachenfels 48'; Hofmann 68'	Report	Arana 60'

The Mansion of Dragons, Brasschaat
Umpires:
Michiel Brüning (NED)
Chris McConkey (IRL)

23 October 2011
17:00

Club de Campo (Spain)	4–0	(Belgium) Racing Bruxelles
Magner 29'; Tubau 58'; Borrell 62'; Rodriguez 70'	Report

The Mansion of Dragons, Brasschaat
Umpires:
Andrew Mair (SCO)
Jonas van 't Hek (NED)

=== Pool E ===
Pos	Team	Pld	W	D	L	GF	GA	GD	Pts	Qualification
1	(Belgium) Dragons (H)	2	2	0	0	12	4	+8	10	Advance to knockout stage
2	(Netherlands) Rotterdam	2	1	0	1	15	6	+9	6	Advance to knockout stage
3	(Switzerland) Rotweiss Wettingen	2	0	0	2	1	18	−17	0	

Source: EHF
(H) Hosts

21 October 2011
15:30

Rotterdam (Netherlands)	11–1	(Switzerland) Rotweiss Wettingen
Weusthof 4', 13', 18', 39'; J. Hertzberger 25', 34', 42', 56'; Rischen 28'; Wilson 43', 46'	Report	M. Keller 60'

The Mansion of Dragons, Brasschaat
Umpires:
Chris McConkey (IRL)
Juan Manuel Requena (ESP)

22 October 2011
15:45

Rotweiss Wettingen (Switzerland)	0–7	(Belgium) Dragons
	Report	Stumpe 14'; Van Aubel 38', 68'; Thys 42', 64'; L. Vandeweghe 49'; Luypaert 66'

The Mansion of Dragons, Brasschaat
Umpires:
Mike Gerwig (GER)
Jonas van 't Hek (NED)

23 October 2011
14:30

Dragons (Belgium)	5–4	(Netherlands) Rotterdam
Van Aubel 4', 12'; Denayer 46'; C. Vandeweghe 68'; Luypaert 70'	Report	Weusthof 16'; J. Hertzberger 25'; De Vidal de St. Germain 30'; Melkert 45'

The Mansion of Dragons, Brasschaat
Umpires:
Andrew Kennedy (ENG)
Chris McConkey (IRL)

=== Pool F ===
Pos	Team	Pld	W	D	L	GF	GA	GD	Pts	Qualification
1	(Germany) UHC Hamburg	2	2	0	0	7	3	+4	10	Advance to knockout stage
2	(France) Montrouge	2	1	0	1	4	5	−1	6	Advance to knockout stage
3	(Ireland) Banbridge	2	0	0	2	6	9	−3	2	

Source: EHF

21 October 2011
11:00

Montrouge (France)	4–3	(Ireland) Banbridge
Cariolet 3'; C. Thiolon 30'; Durchon 33'; Harou 38'	Report	R. McCandless 11'; Sc. Forbes 24'; S. Dowds 49'

The Mansion of Dragons, Brasschaat
Umpires:
Andrew Kennedy (ENG)
Jonas van 't Hek (NED)

22 October 2011
11:15

UHC Hamburg (Germany)	2–0	(France) Montrouge
Simon 51'; Miltkau 55'	Report

The Mansion of Dragons, Brasschaat
Umpires:
Juan Manuel Requena (ESP)
Gregory Uyttenhove (BEL)

23 October 2011
10:30

Banbridge (Ireland)	3–5	(Germany) UHC Hamburg
Caruth 17'; B. McCandless 46'; S. Dowds 65'	Report	Nevado 10'; Fuchs 34'; J. Fürste 41', 43'; Gremnitz 57'

The Mansion of Dragons, Brasschaat
Umpires:
Michal Margolien (SVK)
Gregory Uyttenhove (BEL)

=== Pool G ===
Pos	Team	Pld	W	D	L	GF	GA	GD	Pts	Qualification
1	(England) East Grinstead	2	2	0	0	9	5	+4	10	Advance to knockout stage
2	(Russia) Dinamo Elektrostal	2	1	0	1	8	10	−2	5	Advance to knockout stage
3	(Poland) Grunwald Poznań	2	0	0	2	6	8	−2	2	

Source: EHF

7 October 2011
09:30

Grunwald Poznań (Poland)	4–5	(Russia) Dinamo Elektrostal
Marcinkowski 18+'; Dutkiewicz 33'; Majchrzak 56'; Rataj 63'	Report	Platonov 23', 45'; O.G. 30'; Azarov 58'; A. Kuraev 65'

Waldstadion, Mülheim
Umpires:
Christian Blasch (GER)
Daniel Clarke (IRL)

8 October 2011
09:30

Dinamo Elektrostal (Russia)	3–6	(England) East Grinstead
Platonov 4'; Zamalutdinov 33'; Mamoshkin 46'	Report	De Prez 3'; Jackson 16', 42'; Hall 17', 32'; Pearn 38'

Waldstadion, Mülheim
Umpires:
Nathan Stagno (GIB)
Benjamin Mauss (FRA)

9 October 2011
09:30

East Grinstead (England)	3–2	(Poland) Grunwald Poznań
Gleghorne 5'; Jackson 7'; Hall 51'	Report	Dutkiewicz 22', 57'

Waldstadion, Mülheim
Umpires:
Thomas Lingg (SUI)
Nathan Stagno (GIB)

=== Pool H ===
Pos	Team	Pld	W	D	L	GF	GA	GD	Pts	Qualification
1	(Netherlands) Bloemendaal	2	2	0	0	13	1	+12	10	Advance to knockout stage
2	(Russia) Dinamo Kazan	2	1	0	1	3	4	−1	6	Advance to knockout stage
3	(Ukraine) Olympia Kolos Sekvoia	2	0	0	2	1	12	−11	1	

Source: EHF

7 October 2011
14:30

Dinamo Kazan (Russia)	2–1	(Ukraine) Olympia Kolos Sekvoia
Kornilov 28'; Maiorov 50'	Report	Ozerskyi 31'

Waldstadion, Mülheim
Umpires:
Francesco Parisi (ITA)
Dan Barstow (ENG)

8 October 2011
17:00

Olympia Kolos Sekvoia (Ukraine)	0–10	(Netherlands) Bloemendaal
	Report	Brouwer 7', 46', 49'; Van Puffelen 10'; Van Mierlo 17', 60'; O. Meijer 20'; Hofman 26'; N. Meijer 39'; De Nooijer 44'

Waldstadion, Mülheim
Umpires:
Christian Blasch (GER)
Francesco Parisi (ITA)

7 October 2011
17:00

Bloemendaal (Netherlands)	3–1	(Russia) Dinamo Kazan
N. Meijer 8'; Brouwer 47'; S. Jolie 49'	Report	Zakirov 54'

Waldstadion, Mülheim
Umpires:
Dan Barstow (ENG)
Mikael Mattsson (SWE)

== Knockout stage ==
The round of 16 and the quarter-finals were played in Rotterdam, Netherlands from 6 to 9 April 2012 and the semi-finals, bronze medal match and the final were played in Amstelveen, Netherlands from 26 to 27 May 2012. If the score remained tied, the match went to extra time with the silver goal rule being enforced. Matches that remained tied at the end of extra time were settled by a penalty shoot-out.

=== Bracket ===
Round of 16
6 April – Rotterdam
(England) Beeston	2
(Spain) Club de Campo	1
6 April – Rotterdam
(Germany) UHC Hamburg	3
(Spain) Real Club de Polo	0
7 April – Rotterdam
(Belgium) Dragons	2
(Russia) Dinamo Elektrostal	0
7 April – Rotterdam
(Germany) Club an der Alster	1
(England) Reading	3
6 April – Rotterdam
(Netherlands) Amsterdam	6
(Russia) Dinamo Kazan	0
6 April – Rotterdam
(Netherlands) Bloemendaal	4
(Spain) Atlètic Terrassa	3
7 April – Rotterdam
(England) East Grinstead	8
(France) Montrouge	0
7 April – Rotterdam
(Germany) Uhlenhorst Mülheim	4 (4)
(Netherlands) Rotterdam (s.o.)	4 (5)

Quarter-finals
8 April – Rotterdam
(England) Beeston	1
(Germany) UHC Hamburg	7
9 April – Rotterdam
(Belgium) Dragons (a.e.t.)	3
(England) Reading	1
8 April – Rotterdam
(Netherlands) Amsterdam	3
(Netherlands) Bloemendaal	2
9 April – Rotterdam
(England) East Grinstead	1
(Netherlands) Rotterdam	3

Semi-finals
26 May – Amstelveen
(Germany) UHC Hamburg (s.o.)	2 (2)
(Belgium) Dragons	2 (1)
26 May – Amstelveen
(Netherlands) Amsterdam	3
(Netherlands) Rotterdam	0

Final
27 May – Amstelveen
(Germany) UHC Hamburg (s.o.)	2 (2)
(Netherlands) Amsterdam	2 (1)
Bronze medal match
27 May – Amstelveen
(Belgium) Dragons (a.e.t.)	4
(Netherlands) Rotterdam	3

=== Round of 16 ===
6 April 2012
09:30

Beeston (England)	2–1	(Spain) Club de Campo
Arnold 58'; Smith 63'	Report	Lasso 29'

Hazelaarweg Stadion, Rotterdam
Umpires:
Marcin Grochal (POL)
Geoff Conn (IRL)

6 April 2012
12:00

UHC Hamburg (Germany)	3–0	(Spain) Real Club de Polo
Miltkau 33', 57'; Falcke 43'	Report

Hazelaarweg Stadion, Rotterdam
Umpires:
Colin Hutchinson (IRL)
Jonas van 't Hek (NED)

6 April 2012
14:30

Amsterdam (Netherlands)	6–0	(Russia) Dinamo Kazan
Verga 26'; Schwarz 31', 69'; Bakker 39'; Pruyser 39', 45'	Report

Hazelaarweg Stadion, Rotterdam
Umpires:
Dan Barstow (ENG)
Francisco Vazquez (ESP)

6 April 2012
17:00

Bloemendaal (Netherlands)	4–3	(Spain) Atlètic Terrassa
O. Meijer 22'; Hofman 32'; Brouwer 50'; Bovendeert 55'	Report	P. Castelló 38'; Ballbe 59'; Oliva 64'

Hazelaarweg Stadion, Rotterdam
Umpires:
Christian Blasch (GER)
Gregory Uyttenhove (BEL)

7 April 2012
09:30

East Grinstead (England)	8–0	(France) Montrouge
Jackson 7', 30', 47'; Gleghorne 37', 53', 69'; Carr 51'; Cheesman 52'	Report

Hazelaarweg Stadion, Rotterdam
Umpires:
Christian Blasch (GER)
Geoff Conn (IRL)

7 April 2012
12:00

Dragons (Belgium)	2–0	(Russia) Dinamo Elektrostal
Cobbaert 12'; Denayer 47'	Report

Hazelaarweg Stadion, Rotterdam
Umpires:
Dan Barstow (ENG)
Diego Estebanez (ESP)

7 April 2012
14:30

Uhlenhorst Mülheim (Germany)	4–4 (a.e.t.)	(Netherlands) Rotterdam
Otto 40'; Stralkowski 40', 67'; Fleckhaus 44'	Report	O.G. 5'; Wilson 7', 34', 38'
Penalties
Stralkowski (penalty shoot-out scored); Rabente (penalty shoot-out missed); Fürk (penalty shoot-out scored); Rühr (penalty shoot-out missed); Fleckhaus (penalty shoot-out scored); Stralkowski (penalty shoot-out scored); Fürk (penalty shoot-out missed)	4–5	(penalty shoot-out scored) J. Hertzberger; (penalty shoot-out scored) Wilson; (penalty shoot-out missed) Polkamp; (penalty shoot-out scored) Van der Horst; (penalty shoot-out missed) W. Hertzberger; (penalty shoot-out scored) J. Hertzberger; (penalty shoot-out scored) Wilson

Hazelaarweg Stadion, Rotterdam
Umpires:
Colin Hutchinson (IRL)
Gregory Uyttenhove (BEL)

7 April 2012
17:00

Club an der Alster (Germany)	1–3	(England) Reading
J. Fröschle 61'	Report	Mackay 2'; S. Mantell 54'; Watts 67'

Hazelaarweg Stadion, Rotterdam
Umpires:
Marcin Grochal (POL)
Francisco Vazquez (ESP)

=== Quarter-finals ===
8 April 2012
12:00

Beeston (England)	1–7	(Germany) UHC Hamburg
S. Lawrence 17'	Report	Miltkau 9', 64'; Nevado 13'; Fuchs 22', 33'; Simon 56'; J. Fürste 62'

Hazelaarweg Stadion, Rotterdam
Umpires:
Colin Hutchinson (IRL)
Diego Estebanez (ESP)

8 April 2012
14:30

Amsterdam (Netherlands)	3–2	(Netherlands) Bloemendaal
Taekema 8'; Pruyser 33'; Rohof 51'	Report	W. Jolie 50'; O. Meijer 70'

Hazelaarweg Stadion, Rotterdam
Umpires:
Francisco Vazquez (ESP)
Christian Blasch (GER)

9 April 2012
12:00

Dragons (Belgium)	3–1 (a.e.t.)	(England) Reading
Butler 22'; Thys 78'; Pangrazio 80'	Report	Watts 44'

Hazelaarweg Stadion, Rotterdam
Umpires:
Jonas van 't Hek (NED
Geoff Conn (IRL)

9 April 2012
14:30

East Grinstead (England)	1–3	(Netherlands) Rotterdam
Gleghorne 52'	Report	J. Hertzberger 15', 22'; Weusthof 67'

Hazelaarweg Stadion, Rotterdam
Umpires:
Christian Blasch (GER)
Marcin Grochal (POL)

=== Semi-finals ===
26 May 2012
12:00

UHC Hamburg (Germany)	2–2 (a.e.t.)	(Belgium) Dragons
M. Fürste 40'; Breitenstein 59'	Report	Van Aubel 7'; Denayer 35'
Penalties
M. Fürste (penalty shoot-out scored); Perdoni (penalty shoot-out scored); Miltkau (penalty shoot-out missed); Müller (penalty shoot-out missed)	2–1	(penalty shoot-out missed) Magee; (penalty shoot-out scored) Van Doren; (penalty shoot-out missed) Luypaert; (penalty shoot-out missed) L. Vandeweghe; (penalty shoot-out missed) C. Vandeweghe

Wagener Stadium, Amstelveen
Umpires:
Colin Hutchinson (IRL)
Hamish Jamson (ENG)

26 May 2012
14:30

Amsterdam (Netherlands)	3–0	(Netherlands) Rotterdam
Verga 17'; D. Prins 59'; Rohof 64'	Report

Wagener Stadium, Amstelveen
Umpires:
Christian Blasch (GER)
Nathan Stagno (GIB)

=== Bronze medal match ===
27 May 2012
09:30

Dragons (Belgium)	4–3 (a.e.t.)	(Netherlands) Rotterdam
Pangrazio 42', 57'; C. Vandeweghe 70'; Denayer 78'	Report	Weusthof 3', 65'; Turkstra 45'

Wagener Stadium, Amstelveen
Umpires:
Nathan Stagno (GIB)
Andrew Kennedy (ENG)

=== Final ===
27 May 2012
14:30

UHC Hamburg (Germany)	2–2 (a.e.t.)	(Netherlands) Amsterdam
Bruns 26'; Miltkau 59'	Report	Taekema 21'; Evers 28'
Penalties
M. Fürste (penalty shoot-out missed); Korn (penalty shoot-out scored); Perdoni (penalty shoot-out missed); Müller (penalty shoot-out scored); Miltkau (penalty shoot-out missed)	2–1	(penalty shoot-out scored) Buissant; (penalty shoot-out missed) Verga; (penalty shoot-out missed) Tigges; (penalty shoot-out missed) Evers; (penalty shoot-out missed) Bakker

Wagener Stadium, Amstelveen
Umpires:
Colin Hutchinson (IRL)
Hamish Jamson (ENG)
