= 2015 Men's EuroHockey Championship squads =

This article displays the rosters for the teams competing at the 2015 Men's EuroHockey Championship. Each team had to submit 18 players.

== Pool A ==
=== England ===
Head Coach: Bobby Crutchley

- George Pinner (gk)
- James Bailey (gk)
- Henry Weir
- Ashley Jackson
- Harry Martin
- Alastair Brogdon
- Michael Hoare
- Sam Ward
- Mark Gleghorne
- Adam Dixon
- Barry Middleton (capt)
- Dan Shingles
- David Condon
- Iain Lewers
- Chris Griffiths
- Nicholas Catlin
- Daniel Fox
- David Ames

=== Netherlands ===
Head Coach: Max Caldas

- Jaap Stockmann (gk)
- Glenn Schuurman
- Billy Bakker
- Seve van Ass
- Valentin Verga
- Jeroen Hertzberger
- Sander de Wijn
- Sander Baart
- Robbert Kemperman
- Mirco Pruyser
- Bob de Voogd
- Rogier Hofman
- Robert van der Horst (capt)
- Thierry Brinkman
- Pirmin Blaak (gk)
- Constantijn Jonker
- Hidde Turkstra
- Mink van der Weerden

=== Russia ===
Head Coach: Mikhail Bukatin

- Marat Gafarov (gk)
- Sergey Kostarev
- Aleksandr Cherenkov
- Alexey Pozdnyakov
- Ilfat Zamalutdinov
- Nikolay Komarov
- Alexander Palyanitsa
- Anton Kornilov
- Pavel Plesetskii
- Sergei Spichkovskii
- Denis Shchipachev
- Aleksei Maiorov
- Nikolay Yankun (capt)
- Ivan Ozherelev (gk)
- Iaroslav Loginov
- Mikhail Proskuriakov
- Ilya Larikov
- Igor Siniagin

=== Spain ===
Head Coach: Frederic Soyez

- Quico Cortés (gk)
- Sergi Enrique (capt)
- Bosco Pérez-Pla
- Miguel Delas
- Viçens Ruiz
- Ricardo Santana
- Enrique González
- Roc Oliva
- Jordi Carrera
- Andrés Mir
- Gabriel Dabanch
- Mario Fernández (gk)
- Xavi Lleonart
- Alejandro de Frutos x
- Marc Sallés
- Salva Piera
- Álex Casasayas
- Pau Quemada

== Pool B ==
=== Belgium ===
Head Coach: Jeroen Delmee

- Jeremy Gucassoff (gk)
- Arthur van Doren
- John-John Dohmen (capt)
- Florent van Aubel
- Sébastien Dockier
- Cédric Charlier
- Gauthier Boccard
- Alexandre de Paeuw
- Emmanuel Stockbroeckx
- Alexander Hendrickx
- Mathew Cobbaert
- Félix Denayer
- Vincent Vanasch (gk)
- Loïck Luypaert
- Tom Boon
- Jérôme Truyens
- Elliot Van Strydonck
- Tanguy Cosyns

=== France ===
Head Coach: Gaël Foulard

- Viktor Lockwood
- Jean-Laurent Kieffer
- Tom Genestet (capt)
- Hugo Genestet
- Simon Martin-Brisac
- Olivier Sanchez
- Charles Masson
- Alexis Fourcroy
- Gaspard Baumgarten
- Guillaume Deront
- François Goyet
- Jean-Baptiste Forgues
- Francois Scheefer
- Victor Charlet
- Martin Genestet
- Aristide Coisne
- Corentin Saunier (gk)
- Edgar Reynaud (gk)

=== Germany ===
Head Coach: Markus Weise

- Nicolas Jacobi (gk)
- Mathias Müller
- Linus Butt
- Lukas Windfeder
- Martin Häner (co-capt)
- Mats Grambusch
- Oskar Deecke
- Christopher Wesley
- Constantin Staib
- Tobias Hauke (co-capt)
- Christopher Rühr
- Martin Zwicker
- Moritz Fürste
- Marco Miltkau
- Florian Fuchs
- Benedikt Fürk
- Niklas Wellen
- Andreas Spack (gk)

=== Ireland ===
Head Coach: Craig Fulton

- David Harte (gk)
- John Jackson (capt)
- Ronan Gormley
- Michael Watt
- Chris Cargo
- Alan Sothern
- Eugene Magee
- Peter Caruth
- Kirk Shimmins
- Matthew Bell
- Shane O'Donoghue
- Michael Darling
- Michael Robson
- David Fitzgerald (gk)
- Kyle Good
- Jonathan Bruton
- Paul Gleghorne
- Conor Harte
