= Ferdinand Weinke =

German field hockey player

Personal information
- Full name: Ferdinand Paul Leo Weinke
- Born: 26 January 1995 (age 31) Germany

Sport
- Sport: Field hockey
- Position: Defender
- Club: Uhlenhorst Mülheim
Youth career
- Team
- –: Charlottenburg
Senior career
Years	Team	Caps	Goals
2012–2014	Charlottenburg	-	-
2014–present	Uhlenhorst Mülheim	-	-
National team
Years	Team	Caps	Goals
2014–2016	Germany U21		-
2015–	Germany (indoor)	21	(3)
2017–	Germany	59	(1)
Medal record
Representing Germany
Men's field hockey
FIH Junior World Cup
Bronze medal – third place	2016 Lucknow
EuroHockey Junior Championship
Silver medal – second place	2014 Waterloo
Men's indoor hockey
Indoor World Cup
Silver medal – second place	2018 Berlin
Bronze medal – third place	2015 Leipzig
EuroHockey Indoor Championship
Gold medal – first place	2016 Prague
- Updated on 21 January 2020

Ferdinand Paul Leo Weinke (born 26 January 1995) is a German field hockey player who plays as a defender for Uhlenhorst Mülheim and the German national team.

He played in the youth ranks of SC Charlottenburg. He joined Uhlenhorst Mülheim in 2014.

== International career ==
Weinke made his debut for the national team in March 2017. In November 2018, he was selected in the Germany squad for the 2018 World Cup. He also represented Germany at the 2019 European Championship.

== Honours ==
Germany (indoor)

- EuroHockey Indoor Championship: 2016

Uhlenhorst Mülheim

- Bundesliga: 2017–18, 2018–19
- Indoor Bundesliga: 2015–16
- EuroHockey Indoor Club Cup: 2015, 2017
