= 2020 Men's EuroHockey Indoor Club Cup =

International indoor hockey competition

Tournament details
- Host country: Poland
- City: Poznań
- Dates: 14–16 February
- Teams: 8 (from 8 associations)

Final positions
- Champions: (Germany) Club an der Alster (3rd title)
- Runner-up: (Austria) Arminen
- Third place: (Belarus) Minsk

Tournament statistics
- Matches played: 20
- Goals scored: 188 (9.4 per match)
- Top scorer: (Belgium) Philippe Simar (20 goals)

The 2020 Men's EuroHockey Indoor Club Cup was the 31st edition of the Men's EuroHockey Indoor Club Cup, Europe's premier men's club indoor hockey tournament organized by the European Hockey Federation. It was held from 14 to 16 February 2020 in Poznań, Poland.

Club an der Alster won their third title by defeating Arminen 3–1 in the final. Minsk took the bronze medal by defeating the hosts Grunwald Poznań 4–3 and White Star and the defending champions Partille were relegated to the Trophy division.

== Teams ==
Participating clubs qualified based on their country's final rankings from the 2019 competition. The champions from the top six countries from last year's edition together with the top two from the 2019 EuroHockey Indoor Club Trophy were qualified. Poland and Spain were the two promoted countries that replaced the Netherlands and Switzerland.

Pool A	Pool B
(Sweden) Partille	(Austria) Arminen
(Russia) Dinamo Stroitel	(Germany) Club an der Alster
(Belarus) Minsk	(Belgium) White Star
(Poland) Grunwald Poznań	(Spain) Complutense

== Results ==
All times are local, CET (UTC+1).

=== Preliminary round ===
==== Pool A ====
Pos	Team	Pld	W	D	L	GF	GA	GD	Pts	Qualification
1	(Poland) Grunwald Poznań (H)	3	3	0	0	15	10	+5	15	Semi-finals
2	(Belarus) Minsk	3	2	0	1	14	8	+6	11	Semi-finals
3	(Russia) Dinamo Stroitel	3	0	1	2	12	16	−4	3	Pool C
4	(Sweden) Partille	3	0	1	2	14	21	−7	3	Pool C

Source: EHF
Rules for classification: 1) points; 2) matches won; 3) goal difference; 4) goals for; 5) head-to-head result; 6) field goals for.
(H) Hosts

14 February 2020
12:00

Partille (Sweden)	3–8	(Belarus) Minsk
	Report

14 February 2020
13:15

Dinamo Stroitel (Russia)	4–5	(Poland) Grunwald Poznań
	Report

14 February 2020
17:30

Dinamo Stroitel (Russia)	7–7	(Sweden) Partille
	Report

14 February 2020
18:45

Minsk (Belarus)	2–4	(Poland) Grunwald Poznań
	Report

15 February 2020
11:30

Minsk (Belarus)	4–1	(Russia) Dinamo Stroitel
	Report

15 February 2020
12:45

Partille (Sweden)	4–6	(Poland) Grunwald Poznań
	Report

==== Pool B ====
Pos	Team	Pld	W	D	L	GF	GA	GD	Pts	Qualification
1	(Austria) Arminen	3	2	0	1	14	10	+4	11	Semi-finals
2	(Germany) Club an der Aster	3	2	0	1	19	17	+2	11	Semi-finals
3	(Spain) Complutense	3	2	0	1	15	14	+1	11	Pool C
4	(Belgium) White Star	3	0	0	3	14	21	−7	2	Pool C

Source: EHF
Rules for classification: 1) points; 2) matches won; 3) goal difference; 4) goals for; 5) head-to-head result; 6) field goals for.

14 February 2020
09:30

Arminen (Austria)	5–1	(Belgium) White Star
	Report

14 February 2020
10:45

Club an der Aster (Germany)	5–4	(Spain) Complutense
	Report

14 February 2020
15:00

White Star (Belgium)	5–6	(Spain) Complutense
	Report

14 February 2020
16:15

Club an der Aster (Germany)	4–5	(Austria) Arminen
	Report

15 February 2020
09:00

Arminen (Austria)	4–5	(Spain) Complutense
	Report

15 February 2020
10:15

White Star (Belgium)	8–10	(Germany) Club an der Aster
	Report

=== Fifth to eighth place classification ===
==== Pool C ====
The points obtained in the preliminary round against the other team were taken over.

Pos	Team	Pld	W	D	L	GF	GA	GD	Pts	Relegation
5	(Spain) Complutense	3	3	0	0	17	11	+6	15	
6	(Russia) Dinamo Stroitel	3	1	1	1	16	15	+1	8	
7	(Belgium) White Star	3	1	0	2	19	19	0	7	EuroHockey Club Trophy
8	(Sweden) Partille	3	0	1	2	17	24	−7	2	EuroHockey Club Trophy

Source: EHF
Rules for classification: 1) points; 2) matches won; 3) goal difference; 4) goals for; 5) head-to-head result.

15 February 2020
16:30

Partille (Sweden)	6–9	(Belgium) White Star
	Report

15 February 2020
17:45

Dinamo Stroitel (Russia)	2–3	(Spain) Complutense
	Report

16 February 2020
10:15

Dinamo Stroitel (Russia)	7–5	(Belgium) White Star
	Report

16 February 2020
11:30

Complutense (Spain)	8–4	(Sweden) Partille
	Report

=== First to fourth place classification ===
Semi-finals
15 February
(Austria) Arminen	3
(Belarus) Minsk	2
15 February
(Poland) Grunwald Poznań	5
(Germany) Club an der Alster	6

Final
16 February
(Austria) Arminen	1
(Germany) Club an der Alster	3
Third place
16 February
(Belarus) Minsk	4
(Poland) Grunwald Poznań	3

==== Semi-finals ====
15 February 2020
19:00

Arminen (Austria)	3–2	(Belarus) Minsk
	Report

15 February 2020
20:30

Grunwald Poznań (Poland)	5–6	(Germany) Club an der Alster
	Report

==== Third place game ====
16 February 2020
13:00

Minsk (Belarus)	4–3	(Poland) Grunwald Poznań
	Report

==== Final ====
16 February 2020
14:30

Arminen (Austria)	1–3	(Germany) Club an der Alster
	Report

== Final standings ==
Rank	Team
1st place, gold medalist(s)	(Germany) Club an der Alster
2nd place, silver medalist(s)	(Austria) Arminen
3rd place, bronze medalist(s)	(Belarus) Minsk
4	(Poland) Grunwald Poznań
5	(Spain) Complutense
6	(Russia) Dinamo Stroitel
7	(Belgium) White Star
8	(Sweden) Partille

Relegated to the EuroHockey Indoor Club Trophy

== See also ==
- 2019–20 Euro Hockey League
- 2020 Women's EuroHockey Indoor Club Cup
