= 2009–10 Euro Hockey League =

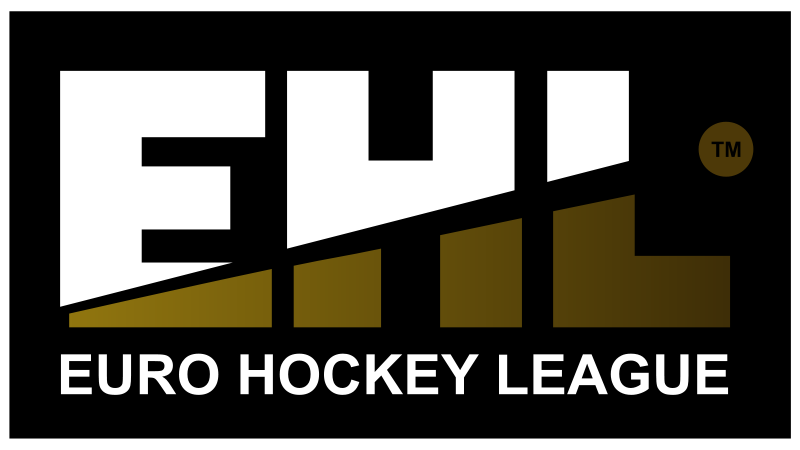

Tournament details
- Dates: 23 October 2009 – 23 May 2010
- Teams: 24 (from 12 associations)
- Venue: 4 (in 4 host cities)

Final positions
- Champions: (Germany) UHC Hamburg (2nd title)
- Runner-up: (Netherlands) Rotterdam
- Third place: (Netherlands) Amsterdam

Tournament statistics
- Matches played: 40
- Goals scored: 221 (5.53 per match)
- Top scorer: (Germany) Christopher Zeller (13 goals)

The 2009–10 Euro Hockey League was the third season of the Euro Hockey League, Europe's premier club field hockey tournament organized by the EHF.

The final was played between UHC Hamburg and Rotterdam at the Wagener Stadium in Amstelveen, Netherlands. UHC Hamburg beat Rotterdam 3–1 to win their second title. Bloemendaal were the title holders, but were eliminated by UHC Hamburg in the quarter-finals.

== Association team allocation ==
Location of teams in 2009–10 Euro Hockey League.
Pink: Group A; Green: Group B; Deep Pink: Group C; Yellow: Group D;
Red: Group E; Cyan: Group F; Blue: Group G; Purple: Group H
Location of Benelux teams in 2009–10 Euro Hockey League

A total of 24 teams from 12 of the 45 EHF member associations participated in the 2019–20 Euro Hockey League. The association ranking based on the EHL country coefficients is used to determine the number of participating teams for each association:

- Associations 1–4 each have three teams qualify.
- Associations 5–8 each have two teams qualify.
- Associations 9–12 each have one team qualify.

=== Association ranking ===
Rank	Change	Association	Teams
1	Steady	Netherlands	3
2	Steady	Spain	3
3	Steady	England	3
4	Steady	Germany	3
5	Steady	France	2
6	Steady	Poland	2
7	Steady	Belgium	2
8	▲2	Ireland	2
9	Steady	Russia	1
10	▼2	Scotland	1
11	▲1	Italy	1
12	New entry	Switzerland	1

=== Teams ===
Qualified teams for 2009–10 Euro Hockey League
(Netherlands) Bloemendaal	(Netherlands) Amsterdam	(Netherlands) Rotterdam	(Spain) Real Club de Polo
(Spain) Atlètic Terrassa	(Spain) Club Egara	(England) Reading	(England) East Grinstead
(England) Beeston	(Germany) UHC Hamburg	(Germany) Club an der Alster	(Germany) Rot-Weiss Köln
(France) Saint Germain	(France) Montrouge	(Poland) Grunwald Poznań	(Poland) AZS AWF Poznań
(Belgium) Leuven	(Belgium) Waterloo Ducks	(Ireland) Pembroke Wanderers	(Ireland) Glenanne
(Scotland) Kelburne	(Russia) Dinamo Kazan	(Italy) Bra	(Switzerland) Rotweiss Wettingen

== Round one ==
In each group, teams played against each other once in a round-robin format. The group winners and runners-up advanced to the round of 16. Pools A, C, D, and F were played in Paris, France, between 23 and 25 October 2009 and the other pools were played in Barcelona, Spain, between 9 and 11 October 2009. If a game was won, the winning team received 5 points. A draw resulted in both teams receiving 2 points. A loss gave the losing team 1 point unless the losing team lost by 3 or more goals, then they received 0 points.

=== Pool A ===
Pos	Team	Pld	W	D	L	GF	GA	GD	Pts	Qualification
1	(Netherlands) Bloemendaal	2	2	0	0	9	1	+8	10	Advance to knockout stage
2	(Germany) Club an der Alster	2	1	0	1	6	3	+3	6	Advance to knockout stage
3	(Switzerland) Rotweiss Wettingen	2	0	0	2	1	12	−11	0	

Source: EHF

23 October 2009
18:30

Club an der Alster (Germany)	5–1	(Switzerland) Rotweiss Wettingen
Fröschle 5', 64', 68'; Borrell 22'; Witthaus 58'	Report	Spörri 41'

Stade Municipal Georges Lefèvre, Saint-Germain-en-Laye
Umpires:
Thomas Dumon (BEL)
Marcin Grochal (POL)

24 October 2009
12:30

Bloemendaal (Netherlands)	7–0	(Switzerland) Rotweiss Wettingen
De Nooijer 10', 36'; Van Mierlo 16'; O. Meijer 39'; N. Meijer 47'; Dwyer 54'; Brouwer 59'	Report

Stade Municipal Georges Lefèvre, Saint-Germain-en-Laye
Umpires:
Dan Barstow (ENG)
Marc Knulle (FRA)

25 October 2009
14:30

Bloemendaal (Netherlands)	2–1	(Germany) Club an der Alster
N. Meijer 6', 33'	Report	Borrell 32'

Stade Municipal Georges Lefèvre, Saint-Germain-en-Laye
Umpires:
Thomas Dumon (BEL)
Marc Knulle (FRA)

=== Pool B ===
Pos	Team	Pld	W	D	L	GF	GA	GD	Pts	Qualification
1	(Spain) Atlètic Terrassa	2	1	1	0	6	4	+2	7	Advance to knockout stage
2	(England) Reading	2	1	1	0	6	5	+1	7	Advance to knockout stage
3	(France) Montrouge	2	0	0	2	5	8	−3	2	

Source: EHF

9 October 2009
14:30

Reading (England)	4–3	(France) Montrouge
R. Mantell 26', 29'; Clarke 39'; S. Mantell 43'	Report	Gaillard 18'; Sanchez 40'; Cariolet 45'

Camp Eduardo Dualde, Barcelona
Umpires:
Warren McCully (IRL)
Roel van Eert (NED)

10 October 2009
10:30

Atlètic Terrassa (Spain)	4–2	(France) Montrouge
Ribas 17'; P. Castelló 20'; Freixa 39'; Enrique 65'	Report	Jansen 7'; M. Durchon 58'

Camp Eduardo Dualde, Barcelona
Umpires:
Mikael Mattsson (SWE)
David Sweetman (SCO)

11 October 2009
10:30

Atlètic Terrassa (Spain)	2–2	(England) Reading
Ribas 30'; Freixa 35'	Report	R. Mantell 20'; O.G. 33'

Camp Eduardo Dualde, Barcelona
Umpires:
Warren McCully (IRL)
Bjorn Bachmann (GER)

=== Pool C ===
Pos	Team	Pld	W	D	L	GF	GA	GD	Pts	Qualification
1	(Netherlands) Amsterdam	2	2	0	0	8	1	+7	10	Advance to knockout stage
2	(England) East Grinstead	2	1	0	1	5	3	+2	6	Advance to knockout stage
3	(Poland) AZS AWF Poznań	2	0	0	2	1	10	−9	0	

Source: EHF

23 October 2009
16:30

East Grinstead (England)	4–1	(Poland) AZS AWF Poznań
Carr 21', 61'; B. Payne 50'; De Prez 68'	Report	Rataj 44'

Stade Municipal Georges Lefèvre, Saint-Germain-en-Laye
Umpires:
Christian Blasch (GER)
Martin Madden (SCO)

24 October 2009
14:30

East Grinstead (England)	1–2	(Netherlands) Amsterdam
Carr 23'	Report	Reckers 24'; Buissant 53'

Stade Municipal Georges Lefèvre, Saint-Germain-en-Laye
Umpires:
Geoff Conn (IRL)
Andrew Mair (SCO)

25 October 2009
12:30

Amsterdam (Netherlands)	6–0	(Poland) AZS AWF Poznań
Verga 21'; Derikx 23'; Buissant 35'; Evers 41'; Eikelboom 52', 61'	Report

Stade Municipal Georges Lefèvre, Saint-Germain-en-Laye
Umpires:
Thomas Lingg (SUI)
Andrew Mair (SCO)

=== Pool D ===
Pos	Team	Pld	W	D	L	GF	GA	GD	Pts	Qualification
1	(Germany) Rot-Weiss Köln	2	2	0	0	14	3	+11	10	Advance to knockout stage
2	(Spain) Club Egara	2	1	0	1	5	5	0	6	Advance to knockout stage
3	(Italy) Bra	2	0	0	2	3	14	−11	1	

Source: EHF

23 October 2009
14:30

Club Egara (Spain)	3–2	(Italy) Bra
Carrera 13'; M. Garcia 41'; Clapes 48'	Report	M. Lanzano 15'; Kanwalpreet 23'

Stade Municipal Georges Lefèvre, Saint-Germain-en-Laye
Umpires:
Marc Knulle (FRA)
Thomas Lingg (SUI)

24 October 2009
10:30

Rot-Weiss Köln (Germany)	11–1	(Italy) Bra
Montag 4'; C. Zeller 6', 14', 23', 37', 41', 66', 70'; Von Schmidt-Pauli 57'; Hauke 63'; Brandes 69'	Report	Kanwalpreet 46'

Stade Municipal Georges Lefèvre, Saint-Germain-en-Laye
Umpires:
Thomas Dumon (BEL)
Marcin Grochal (POL)

25 October 2009
10:30

Rot-Weiss Köln (Germany)	3–2	(Spain) Club Egara
C. Zeller 24', 30', 55'	Report	J. Romeu 22'; Amat 44'

Stade Municipal Georges Lefèvre, Saint-Germain-en-Laye
Umpires:
Dan Barstow (ENG)
Martin Madden (SCO)

=== Pool E ===
Pos	Team	Pld	W	D	L	GF	GA	GD	Pts	Qualification
1	(Spain) Real Club de Polo (H)	2	2	0	0	9	3	+6	10	Advance to knockout stage
2	(Belgium) Waterloo Ducks	2	1	0	1	4	3	+1	6	Advance to knockout stage
3	(Russia) Dinamo Kazan	2	0	0	2	3	10	−7	1	

Source: EHF
(H) Hosts

9 October 2009
20:30

Real Club de Polo (Spain)	7–2	(Russia) Dinamo Kazan
Quemada 23', 33', 36', 45', 58'; Padrós 33', 69'	Report	Warsi 68', 69'

Camp Eduardo Dualde, Barcelona
Umpires:
Hamish Jamson (ENG)
Luca Ferrara (ITA)

10 October 2009
16:30

Waterloo Ducks (Belgium)	3–1	(Russia) Dinamo Kazan
A. De Saedeleer 7'; Brooke 67'; De Paeuw 69'	Report	Warsi 10'

Camp Eduardo Dualde, Barcelona
Umpires:
Warren McCully (IRL)
Henrik Ehlers (DEN)

11 October 2009
16:30

Waterloo Ducks (Belgium)	1–2	(Spain) Real Club de Polo
Tys 38'	Report	Dabanch 6', 29'

Camp Eduardo Dualde, Barcelona
Umpires:
Roel van Eert (NED)
David Sweetman (SCO)

=== Pool F ===
Pos	Team	Pld	W	D	L	GF	GA	GD	Pts	Qualification
1	(England) Beeston	2	2	0	0	4	0	+4	10	Advance to knockout stage
2	(Belgium) Leuven	2	1	0	1	7	4	+3	5	Advance to knockout stage
3	(France) Saint Germain (H)	2	0	0	2	1	8	−7	1	

Source: EHF
(H) Hosts

23 October 2009
20:30

Saint Germain (France)	1–7	(Belgium) Leuven
M. Genestet 50'	Report	Maguire 6', 22', 28'; Houssein 9'; Garreta 29'; Darling 44'; Quemada 64'

Stade Municipal Georges Lefèvre, Saint-Germain-en-Laye
Umpires:
Geoff Conn (IRL)
Andrew Mair (SCO)

24 October 2009
16:30

Beeston (England)	3–0	(Belgium) Leuven
M. Jones 26', 59'; Monte 30'	Report

Stade Municipal Georges Lefèvre, Saint-Germain-en-Laye
Umpires:
Christian Blasch (GER)
Martin Madden (SCO)

25 October 2009
16:30

Saint Germain (France)	0–1	(England) Beeston
	Report	Rowland 69'

Stade Municipal Georges Lefèvre, Saint-Germain-en-Laye
Umpires:
Christian Blasch (GER)
Marcin Grochal (POL)

=== Pool G ===
Pos	Team	Pld	W	D	L	GF	GA	GD	Pts	Qualification
1	(Netherlands) Rotterdam	2	2	0	0	12	1	+11	10	Advance to knockout stage
2	(Ireland) Pembroke Wanderers	2	1	0	1	5	8	−3	5	Advance to knockout stage
3	(Scotland) Kelburne	2	0	0	2	2	10	−8	1	

Source: EHF

9 October 2009
18:30

Pembroke Wanderers (Ireland)	4–2	(Scotland) Kelburne
Sothern 1', 8', 15', 54'	Report	Stott 39'; Ralph 45'

Camp Eduardo Dualde, Barcelona
Umpires:
Eduardo Lizana (ESP)
Mikael Mattsson (SWE)

10 October 2009
14:30

Rotterdam (Netherlands)	6–0	(Scotland) Kelburne
Burrows 5', 60'; Schwarz 40', 67'; Kruize 54'; Van Buul 57'	Report

Camp Eduardo Dualde, Barcelona
Umpires:
Bjorn Bachmann (GER)
Hamish Jamson (ENG)

11 October 2009
14:30

Pembroke Wanderers (Ireland)	1–6	(Netherlands) Rotterdam
Sothern 33'	Report	Maas 7'; J. Hertzberger 13', 28', 64'; Van der Horst 50'; Burrows 67'

Camp Eduardo Dualde, Barcelona
Umpires:
Henrik Ehlers (DEN)
Eduardo Lizana (ESP)

=== Pool H ===
Pos	Team	Pld	W	D	L	GF	GA	GD	Pts	Qualification
1	(Germany) UHC Hamburg	2	2	0	0	7	3	+4	10	Advance to knockout stage
2	(Poland) Grunwald Poznań	2	1	0	1	8	4	+4	6	Advance to knockout stage
3	(Ireland) Glenanne	2	0	0	2	2	10	−8	0	

Source: EHF

9 October 2009
16:30

UHC Hamburg (Germany)	4–1	(Ireland) Glenanne
M. Fürste 5', 39'; Fuchs 17', 58'	Report	Butler 21'

Camp Eduardo Dualde, Barcelona
Umpires:
Henrik Ehlers (DEN)
David Sweetman (SCO)

10 October 2009
12:30

Grunwald Poznań (Poland)	6–1	(Ireland) Glenanne
Petrykowski 2'; Hutek 11', 49'; Dutkiewicz 33'; Mikula 54'; Bratkowski 64'	Report	Kane 70'

Camp Eduardo Dualde, Barcelona
Umpires:
Roel van Eert (NED)
Eduardo Lizana (ESP)

11 October 2009
12:30

Grunwald Poznań (Poland)	2–3	(Germany) UHC Hamburg
Dutkiewicz 48'; Hutek 60'	Report	McAleese 2'; Witte 22'; M. Fürste 24'

Camp Eduardo Dualde, Barcelona
Umpires:
Hamish Jamson (ENG)
Mikael Mattsson (SWE)

== Knockout stage ==
The Round of 16 and the quarterfinals were played in Rotterdam, Netherlands between 2 and 5 April 2010 and the semifinals, third place match and the final were played in Amstelveen, Netherlands between 22 and 23 May 2010. Matches that ended in a draw would then play two periods of 7.5 minutes, with the "Silver Goal" rule being enforced. Matches that remain tied at the end of extra time were settled by a penalty shoot-out.

=== Bracket ===
Round of 16
3 April – Rotterdam
(Netherlands) Bloemendaal	6
(Germany) Club an der Alster	2
3 April – Rotterdam
(Germany) UHC Hamburg	6
(Belgium) Waterloo Ducks	2
2 April – Rotterdam
(Spain) Real Club de Polo	2
(England) Reading	1
2 April – Rotterdam
(Germany) Rot-Weiss Köln	3
(Ireland) Pembroke Wanderers	0
2 April – Rotterdam
(Netherlands) Amsterdam	3
(England) East Grinstead	2
2 April – Rotterdam
(England) Beeston	1
(Belgium) Leuven	3
3 April – Rotterdam
(Netherlands) Rotterdam	2
(Spain) Club Egara	1
3 April – Rotterdam
(Spain) Atlètic Terrassa	4
(Poland) Grunwald Poznań	3

Quarter-finals
5 April – Rotterdam
(Netherlands) Bloemendaal	3 (0)
(Germany) UHC Hamburg (p.s.)	3 (2)
4 April – Rotterdam
(Spain) Real Club de Polo	3
(Germany) Rot-Weiss Köln	2
4 April – Rotterdam
(Netherlands) Amsterdam	3
(Belgium) Leuven	2
5 April – Rotterdam
(Netherlands) Rotterdam	5
(Spain) Atlètic Terrassa	3

Semi-finals
22 May – Amstelveen
(Germany) UHC Hamburg (p.s.)	2 (1)
(Spain) Real Club de Polo	2 (0)
22 May – Amstelveen
(Netherlands) Amsterdam	3
(Netherlands) Rotterdam	4

Final
23 May – Amstelveen
(Germany) UHC Hamburg	3
(Netherlands) Rotterdam	1
Bronze medal match
23 May – Amstelveen
(Spain) Real Club de Polo	2 (1)
(Netherlands) Amsterdam (p.s.)	2 (2)

=== Round of 16 ===
2 April 2010
09:30

Beeston (England)	1–3	(Belgium) Leuven
Monte 28'	Report	Garreta 38'; Houssein 42'; Maguire 69'

Hazelaarweg Stadion, Rotterdam
Umpires:
Nathan Stagno (GIB)
Marcin Grochal (POL)

2 April 2010
12:00

Real Club de Polo (Spain)	2–1	(England) Reading
Witthaus 19'; Quemada 48'	Report	Clarke 53'

Hazelaarweg Stadion, Rotterdam
Umpires:
Christian Blasch (GER)
Bart de Liefde (NED)

2 April 2010
14:30

Amsterdam (Netherlands)	3–2	(England) East Grinstead
Taekema 44'; Verga 55'; Prins 56'	Report	Carr 10', 48'

Hazelaarweg Stadion, Rotterdam
Umpires:
Marcelo Servetto (ESP)
Warren McCully (IRL)

2 April 2010
17:00

Rot-Weiss Köln (Germany)	3–0	(Ireland) Pembroke Wanderers
P. Zeller 11'; B. Weß 38'; C. Zeller 68'	Report

Hazelaarweg Stadion, Rotterdam
Umpires:
Andrew Mair (SCO)
Will Drury (WAL)

3 April 2010
09:30

Atlètic Terrassa (Spain)	4–3	(Poland) Grunwald Poznań
Freixa 3', 34'; Guerrero 38'; Ribas 39'	Report	Dutkiewicz 18'; Hutek 48'; Mikula 51'

Hazelaarweg Stadion, Rotterdam
Umpires:
Andrew Kennedy (ENG)
Bart de Liefde (NED)

3 April 2010
12:00

Rotterdam (Netherlands)	2–1	(Spain) Club Egara
W. Hertzberger 3'; J. Hertzberger 19'	Report	Arbos 9'

Hazelaarweg Stadion, Rotterdam
Umpires:
Marcin Grochal (POL)
Christian Blasch (GER)

3 April 2010
14:30

Bloemendaal (Netherlands)	6–2	(Germany) Club an der Alster
Kessing 2'; Dwyer 33'; Brouwer 44', 67'; De Nooijer 49'; Van Kan 69'	Report	Hofmann 8'; Fröschle 38'

Hazelaarweg Stadion, Rotterdam
Umpires:
Nathan Stagno (GIB)
Marcelo Servetto (ESP)

3 April 2010
17:00

UHC Hamburg (Germany)	6–2	(Belgium) Waterloo Ducks
Breitenstein 2'; J. Fürste 11'; Miltkau 35', 50'; R. Nevado 42', 43'	Report	O.G. 54'; T. De Saedeleer 70'

Hazelaarweg Stadion, Rotterdam
Umpires:
Warren McCully (IRL)
Will Drury (WAL)

=== Quarter-finals ===
4 April 2010
12:00

Real Club de Polo (Spain)	3–2	(Germany) Rot-Weiss Köln
O.G. 34'; Dabanch 54'; Quemada 68'	Report	C. Zeller 18', 43'

Hazelaarweg Stadion, Rotterdam
Umpires:
Bart de Liefde (NED)
Andrew Mair (SCO)

4 April 2010
14:30

Amsterdam (Netherlands)	3–2	(Belgium) Leuven
Tigges 2'; Prins 8'; Verga 69'	Report	Bourdeaud'Hui 18'; Darling 52'

Hazelaarweg Stadion, Rotterdam
Umpires:
Nathan Stagno (GIB)
Warren McCully (IRL)

5 April 2010
12:00

Rotterdam (Netherlands)	5–3	(Spain) Atlètic Terrassa
Child 3'; Gerretsen 9'; J. Hertzberger 33', 67'; Archibald 56'	Report	P. Castelló 46'; Sala 57'; Falcioni 69'

Hazelaarweg Stadion, Rotterdam
Umpires:
Andrew Mair (SCO)
Christian Blasch (GER)

5 April 2010
14:30

Bloemendaal (Netherlands)	3–3 (a.e.t.)	(Germany) UHC Hamburg
Brouwer 20'; De Nooijer 33'; Kessing 47'	Report	Fuchs 8'; Breitenstein 41'; O.G. 48'
Penalties
Dwyer (penalty shoot-out missed); Brouwer (penalty shoot-out missed)	0–2	(penalty shoot-out scored) M. Fürste; (penalty shoot-out missed) R. Nevado; (penalty shoot-out scored) J. Fürste

Hazelaarweg Stadion, Rotterdam
Umpires:
Marcelo Servetto (ESP)
Marcin Grochal (POL)

=== Semi-finals ===
22 May 2010
12:00

UHC Hamburg (Germany)	2–2 (a.e.t.)	(Spain) Real Club de Polo
Breitenstein 52'; J. Fürste 63'	Report	O.G. 3'; Quemada 30'
Penalties
M. Fürste (penalty shoot-out scored); Miltkau (penalty shoot-out missed); Fuchs (penalty shoot-out missed)	1–0	(penalty shoot-out missed) Padrós; (penalty shoot-out missed) Casasayas; (penalty shoot-out missed) Witthaus

Wagener Stadium, Amstelveen
Umpires:
Colin Hutchinson (IRL)
Hamish Jamson (ENG)

22 May 2010
14:30

Amsterdam (Netherlands)	3–4	(Netherlands) Rotterdam
Taekema 3', 25'; Prins 12'	Report	Child 10'; J. Hertzberger 15', 47', 68'

Wagener Stadium, Amstelveen
Umpires:
Christian Blasch (GER)
Andrew Mair (SCO)

=== Bronze place match ===
23 May 2010
12:45

Real Club de Polo (Spain)	2–2 (a.e.t.)	(Netherlands) Amsterdam
Piera 16'; Dabanch 34'	Report	Taekema 11'; Tigges 43'
Penalties
Martinez-Zurita (penalty shoot-out missed); Padrós (penalty shoot-out scored); Fàbregas (penalty shoot-out missed)	1–2	(penalty shoot-out scored) Tigges; (penalty shoot-out scored) Buissant

Wagener Stadium, Amstelveen
Umpires:
Nathan Stagno (GIB)
Colin Hutchinson (IRL)

=== Final ===
23 May 2010
15:00

UHC Hamburg (Germany)	3–1	(Netherlands) Rotterdam
Miltkau 35'; Breitenstein 40', 64'	Report	Burrows 43'

Wagener Stadium, Amstelveen
Umpires:
Hamish Jamson (ENG)
Andrew Mair (SCO)

== Statistics ==
=== Top goalscorers ===
Rank	Player	Team	FG	PC	PS	Goals
1	(Germany) Christopher Zeller	(Germany) Rot-Weiss Köln	4	7	2	13
2	(Netherlands) Jeroen Hertzberger	(Netherlands) Rotterdam	4	3	2	9
3	(Spain) Pau Quemada	(Spain) Real Club de Polo	3	5	0	8
4	(Ireland) Alan Sothern	(Ireland) Pembroke Wanderers	2	2	1	5
4	(South Africa) Gareth Carr	(England) East Grinstead	0	4	1	5
4	(Germany) Patrick Breitenstein	(Germany) UHC Hamburg	0	4	1	5

== Test Rules ==
The Euro Hockey League is considered to be something of a pioneer when it comes to rules and regulations. The tournament has introduced various test rules which have now been adopted by the global game, with the "Self Pass" - which allows players to dribble with the ball from a free hit rather than passing it - being arguably the most revolutionary. The 2009-2010 Season saw the introduction of the "Own Goal" trial, which meant that defenders and goalkeepers could no longer force the ball into their own net when an opposing player has hit the ball from outside the circle. The first ever own goal in hockey arrived during Round 1.1, when Atletic Terrassa's Xavi Ribas accidentally deflected into his own goal during their match against Reading HC of England. In total, five own goals were scored during the 2009-2010 season. [2]
