= 2020 Women's Euro Hockey League =

Cancelled field hockey tournament

2020 EHL Women
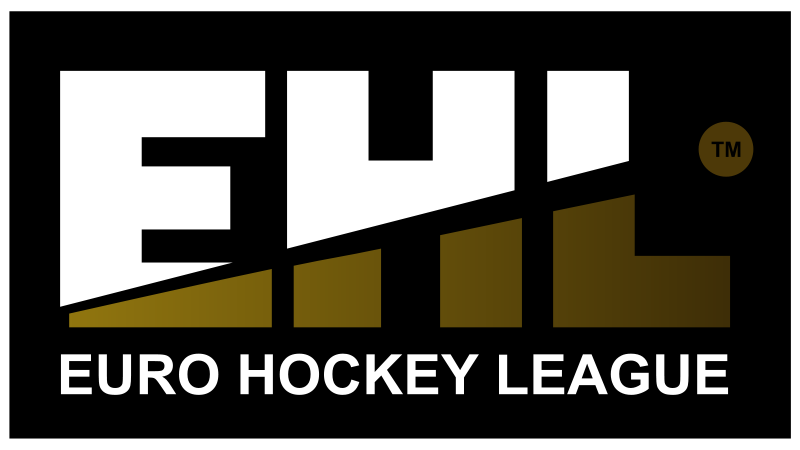

Tournament details
- Host country: Netherlands
- City: Amstelveen
- Dates: Cancelled
- Teams: 8 (from 6 associations)
- Venue: Wagener Stadium

The 2020 Euro Hockey League Women was supposed to be the first edition of the Euro Hockey League Women, Europe's premier women's club field hockey tournament, organized by the European Hockey Federation. It was originally scheduled to be held at the Wagener Stadium in Amstelveen, Netherlands from 9 to 13 April 2020.

Due to the COVID-19 pandemic in Europe the tournament was put on hold in March 2020. On 12 May 2020, it was announced that the tournament was postponed to October 2020. The tournament was officially cancelled on 14 August 2020.

== Association team allocation ==
A total of 8 teams from 6 of the 45 EHF member associations would participate in the 2020 EHL Women. The association rankings based on the EHL country coefficients were used to determine the number of participating teams for each association:

- Associations 1–2 each had two teams qualify.
- Associations 3–6 each had one team qualify.

=== Association ranking ===
For the 2020 Euro Hockey League Women, the associations were allocated places according to their 2019 EHCC country coefficients, which take into account their performance in the EuroHockey Club Cup and the EuroHockey Club Trophy from 2016–17 to 2018–19.

Association ranking for 2020 Euro Hockey League
Rank	Change	Association	Points	Teams
1	Steady	Netherlands	44.875	2
2	Steady	Germany	34.875	2
3	Steady	Spain	32.750	1
4	Steady	England	25.250	1
5	▲1	Ireland	17.875	1
6	▼1	Belarus	17.500	1
7	Steady	Russia	7.125	0
8	▲2	Belgium	5.500	0
9	▲2	Scotland	2.625	0
10	New entry	Ukraine	2.500	0
11	▼3	Czech Republic	1.250	0
12	▼3	France	1.000	0

=== Teams ===
- (Netherlands) Amsterdam
- (Netherlands) Den Bosch
- (Germany) Club an der Alster
- (Germany) UHC Hamburg
- (Spain) Club de Campo
- (England) Surbiton
- (Ireland) Pegasus
- (Belarus) Minsk

== See also ==
- 2019–20 Euro Hockey League
- 2020 Women's EuroHockey Indoor Club Cup
