= 2016 Men's EuroHockey Indoor Club Champions Cup =

International indoor hockey competition

Tournament details
- Host country: Germany
- City: Hamburg
- Dates: 12–14 February
- Teams: 8 (from 8 associations)
- Venue: Harvestehuder THC

Final positions
- Champions: (Germany) Harvestehude (4th title)
- Runner-up: (Austria) Arminen
- Third place: (Sweden) Partille

Tournament statistics
- Matches played: 20
- Goals scored: 123 (6.15 per match)
- Top scorer(s): (Sweden) Tobias Grand (Austria) Michael Körper (11 goals)

The 2016 Men's EuroHockey Indoor Club Champions Cup was the 27th edition of the Men's EuroHockey Indoor Club Champions Cup, Europe's premier men's club indoor hockey tournament organized by the European Hockey Federation. It was held at Harvestehuder THC in Hamburg, Germany from 12 to 14 February 2016.

The hosts Harvestehude won its fourth title by defeating Arminen 2–1 in the final, Partille took the bronze medal and Slavia Prague and Luzerner SC were relegated to the Trophy division..

== Results ==
=== Preliminary round ===
==== Pool A ====
Pos	Team	Pld	W	D	L	GF	GA	GD	Pts	Qualification
1	(Germany) Harvestehude (H)	3	3	0	0	14	7	+7	15	Semi-finals
2	(Sweden) Partille	3	2	0	1	17	7	+10	11	Semi-finals
3	(Czech Republic) Slavia Prague	3	1	0	2	8	15	−7	6	Pool C
4	(Switzerland) Luzerner SC	3	0	0	3	4	14	−10	1	Pool C

Source: EHF
(H) Hosts

12 February 2016
12:20

Harvestehude (Germany)	6–3	(Switzerland) Luzerner SC
	Report

12 February 2016
13:30

Partille (Sweden)	10–3	(Czech Republic) Slavia Prague
	Report

12 February 2016
18:20

Luzerner SC (Switzerland)	1–3	(Czech Republic) Slavia Prague
	Report

12 February 2016
19:30

Partille (Sweden)	2–4	(Germany) Harvestehude
	Report

13 February 2016
11:20

Harvestehude (Germany)	4–2	(Czech Republic) Slavia Prague
	Report

13 February 2016
12:30

Luzerner SC (Switzerland)	0–5	(Sweden) Partille
	Report

==== Pool B ====
Pos	Team	Pld	W	D	L	GF	GA	GD	Pts	Qualification
1	(Austria) Arminen	3	1	2	0	8	6	+2	9 (Note: Arminen won the tiebreaker vs East Grinstead)	Semi-finals
2	(England) East Grinstead	3	1	2	0	8	6	+2	9	Semi-finals
3	(Poland) Grunwald Poznań	3	1	2	0	9	8	+1	9	Pool C
4	(Spain) Complutense	3	0	0	3	6	11	−5	3	Pool C

Source: EHF
Notes:

12 February 2016
10:00

Arminen (Austria)	1–1	(England) East Grinstead
	Report

12 February 2016
11:10

Complutense (Spain)	2–1	(Poland) Grunwald Poznań
	Report

12 February 2016
16:00

East Grinstead (England)	3–3	(Poland) Grunwald Poznań
	Report

12 February 2016
17:10

Complutense (Spain)	2–4	(Austria) Arminen
	Report

13 February 2016
09:00

Arminen (Austria)	3–3	(Poland) Grunwald Poznań
	Report

13 February 2016
10:10

East Grinstead (England)	4–2	(Spain) Complutense
	Report

=== Fifth to eighth place classification ===
==== Pool C ====
Pos	Team	Pld	W	D	L	GF	GA	GD	Pts	Relegation
5	(Poland) Grunwald Poznań	3	3	0	0	16	5	+11	15	
6	(Spain) Complutense	3	1	1	1	10	7	+3	8	
7	(Czech Republic) Slavia Prague	3	1	1	1	7	9	−2	7	EuroHockey Club Trophy
8	(Switzerland) Luzerner SC	3	0	0	3	4	16	−12	1	EuroHockey Club Trophy

Source: EHF

13 February 2016
16:00

Luzerner SC (Switzerland)	2–6	(Spain) Complutense
	Report

13 February 2016
17:10

Slavia Prague (Czech Republic)	2–6	(Poland) Grunwald Poznań
	Report

14 February 2016
10:00

Luzerner SC (Switzerland)	1–7	(Poland) Grunwald Poznań
	Report

14 February 2016
11:10

Slavia Prague (Czech Republic)	2–2	(Spain) Complutense
	Report

=== First to fourth place classification ===
Semi-finals
13 February
(Germany) Harvestehude	4
(England) East Grinstead	0
13 February
(Austria) Arminen	6
(Sweden) Partille	0

Final
14 February
(Germany) Harvestehude	2
(Austria) Arminen	1
Third place
14 February
(England) East Grinstead	1
(Sweden) Partille	4

==== Semi-finals ====
13 February 2016
18:20

Harvestehude (Germany)	4–0	(England) East Grinstead
	Report

13 February 2016
19:45

Arminen (Austria)	6–3	(Sweden) Partille
	Report

==== Third place game ====
14 February 2016
13:00

East Grinstead (England)	1–4	(Sweden) Partille
	Report

==== Final ====
14 February 2016
14:30

Harvestehude (Germany)	2–1	(Austria) Arminen
	Report

== Statistics ==
=== Final standings ===
Pos	Team	Relegation
1	(Germany) Harvestehude (H)	
2	(Austria) Arminen	
3	(Sweden) Partille	
4	(England) East Grinstead	
5	(Poland) Grunwald Poznań	
6	(Spain) Complutense	
7	(Czech Republic) Slavia Prague	EuroHockey Club Trophy
8	(Switzerland) Luzerner SC	EuroHockey Club Trophy

Source: EHF
(H) Host

=== Top goalscorers ===
As of 14 February 2016

Rank	Player	Team	FG	PC	PS	Goals
1	(Sweden) Tobias Grand	(Sweden) Partille	11	0	0	11
1	(Austria) Michael Körper	(Germany) Harvestehude	4	5	2	11
3	(Sweden) Karl Hemvik	(Sweden) Partille	2	8	0	10
4	(Poland) Tomasz Dutkiewicz	(Poland) Grunwald Poznań	3	2	1	6
5	(Germany) Jan Heuer	(Germany) Harvestehude	5	0	0	5
5	(Czech Republic) Jakub Kyndl	(Czech Republic) Slavia Prague	0	5	0	5
7	(Poland) Karol Majchrzak	(Poland) Grunwald Poznań	4	0	0	4
7	(Poland) Mateusz Poltaszewski	(Poland) Grunwald Poznań	4	0	0	4
7	(Czech Republic) David Vacek	(Czech Republic) Slavia Prague	4	0	0	4
7	(Austria) Dominic Uher	(Austria) Arminen	3	1	0	4
7	(Spain) Ricardo Sánchez	(Spain) Complutense	2	2	0	4

== See also ==
- 2015–16 Euro Hockey League
