= Dynamo Kazan =

Dynamo Kazan may refer to:

- Dynamo Kazan Bandy Club, known as Raketa prior to 2008
- WVC Dynamo Kazan, volleyball club
- Dinamo Kazan (field hockey), club competing in the Euro Hockey League
- FC Dynamo Kazan, association football club
