= Mathias Müller =

German field hockey player

Personal information
- Born: 3 April 1992 (age 34) Hamburg, Germany

Sport
- Sport: Field hockey
- Position: Defender
- Club: Hamburger Polo Club
Youth career
- Years: Team
- 1996–2010: UHC Hamburg
Senior career
Years	Team	Caps	Goals
2010–2013	UHC Hamburg	-	-
2013–2018	Rot-Weiss Köln	-	-
2018–present	Hamburger Polo Club	-	-
National team
Years	Team	Caps	Goals
2014–present	Germany	172	(18)
Medal record
Men's field hockey
Representing Germany
Olympic Games
Silver medal – second place	2024 Paris	Team
Bronze medal – third place	2016 Rio de Janeiro	Team
FIH Hockey World Cup
Gold medal – first place	2023 Bhubaneswar–Rourkela
EuroHockey Championship
Silver medal – second place	2015 London
Champions Trophy
Gold medal – first place	2014 Bhubaneswar
Junior World Cup
Gold medal – first place	2013 New Delhi
EuroHockey Junior Championship
Bronze medal – third place	2012 's-Hertogenbosch
- Updated on 2 May 2025

Mathias Müller (born 3 April 1992) is a German field hockey player who plays as a defender for Bundesliga side Hamburger Polo Club and the Germany national team.

== Club career ==
Müller started playing hockey at the age of four at UHC Hamburg. He made his debut for the senior team when he was 18 years old. He then played for Rot-Weiss Köln from 2013 until 2018. In 2018 he returned to Hamburg to play for Hamburger Polo Club.

== International career ==
Müller made his debut for the German national team in 2014. He represented his country at the 2016 Summer Olympics, where he won the bronze medal. On 6 December he was named in the squad for the 2023 Men's FIH Hockey World Cup. He played in all seven matches as Germany won the tournament.

== Honours ==
=== Club ===
UHC Hamburg

- Euro Hockey League: 2009–10, 2011–12

Rot-Weiss Köln

- Bundesliga: 2014–15, 2015–16
- Euro Hockey League: 2016–17
- EuroHockey Indoor Club Cup: 2018

=== National team ===
Germany U21

- Junior World Cup: 2013

Germany

- Summer Olympics silver medal: 2024
- Summer Olympics bronze medal: 2016
- FIH Hockey World Cup: 2023
- Champions Trophy: 2014
