= 2020 Women's EuroHockey Indoor Club Cup =

Indoor hockey tournament in The Hague, Netherlands

Tournament details
- Host country: Netherlands
- City: The Hague
- Dates: 14–16 February
- Teams: 8 (from 8 associations)
- Venue: Sportcampus Zuiderpark

Final positions
- Champions: (Germany) Düsseldorfer HC (2nd title)
- Runner-up: (Netherlands) HDM
- Third place: (Ukraine) Sumchanka

Tournament statistics
- Matches played: 20
- Goals scored: 124 (6.2 per match)
- Top scorer(s): (Russia) Svetlana Eroshina (Ukraine) Olha Honcharenko (8 goals)

The 2020 Women's EuroHockey Indoor Club Cup was the 31st edition of the Women's EuroHockey Indoor Club Cup, Europe's premier women's club indoor hockey tournament organized by the European Hockey Federation. It was held from 14 to 16 February 2020 at the Sportcampus Zuiderpark in The Hague, Netherlands.

Düsseldorfer HC won their second title by defeating the hosts HDM 4–2 in the final. Sumchanka took the bronze medal and East Grinstead and Arminen were relegated to the Trophy division.

== Teams ==
Participating clubs qualified based on their country's final rankings from the 2019 competition. The champions from the top six countries from last year's edition together with the top two from the 2019 EuroHockey Indoor Club Trophy qualified. England and Austria were the two promoted countries that replaced Switzerland and Belgium.

Pool A	Pool B
(Netherlands) HDM	(Russia) Dinamo Elektrostal
(Spain) Club de Campo	(Germany) Düsseldorfer HC
(Ukraine) Sumchanka	(Belarus) Minsk
(England) East Grinstead	(Austria) Arminen

== Results ==
All times are local, CET (UTC+1).

=== Preliminary round ===
==== Pool A ====
Pos	Team	Pld	W	D	L	GF	GA	GD	Pts	Qualification
1	(Netherlands) HDM (H)	3	2	1	0	13	4	+9	12	Semi-finals
2	(Ukraine) Sumchanka	3	1	1	1	12	9	+3	8	Semi-finals
3	(Spain) Club de Campo	3	1	1	1	8	11	−3	7	Pool C
4	(England) East Grinstead	3	0	1	2	1	10	−9	2	Pool C

Source: EHF
Rules for classification: 1) points; 2) matches won; 3) goal difference; 4) goals for; 5) head-to-head result; 6) field goals for.
(H) Hosts

14 February 2020
09:30

Club de Campo (Spain)	0–0	(England) East Grinstead
	Report

14 February 2020
13:15

HDM (Netherlands)	2–2	(Ukraine) Sumchanka
	Report

14 February 2020
17:30

Sumchanka (Ukraine)	5–1	(England) East Grinstead
	Report

14 February 2020
18:45

Club de Campo (Spain)	2–6	(Netherlands) HDM
	Report

15 February 2020
11:30

Sumchanka (Ukraine)	5–6	(Spain) Club de Campo
	Report

15 February 2020
12:45

HDM (Netherlands)	5–0	(England) East Grinstead
	Report

==== Pool B ====
Pos	Team	Pld	W	D	L	GF	GA	GD	Pts	Qualification
1	(Germany) Düsseldorfer HC	3	3	0	0	13	4	+9	15	Semi-finals
2	(Belarus) Minsk	3	1	1	1	6	8	−2	7	Semi-finals
3	(Russia) Dinamo Elektrostal	3	1	0	2	7	11	−4	5	Pool C
4	(Austria) Arminen	3	0	1	2	4	7	−3	4	Pool C

Source: EHF
Rules for classification: 1) points; 2) matches won; 3) goal difference; 4) goals for; 5) head-to-head result; 6) field goals for.

14 February 2020
09:30

Dinamo Elektrostal (Russia)	1–4	(Belarus) Minsk
	Report

14 February 2020
10:45

Düsseldorfer HC (Germany)	2–1	(Austria) Arminen
	Report

14 February 2020
15:00

Minsk (Belarus)	2–2	(Austria) Arminen
	Report

14 February 2020
16:15

Düsseldorfer HC (Germany)	6–3	(Russia) Dinamo Elektrostal
	Report

15 February 2020
09:00

Dinamo Elektrostal (Russia)	3–1	(Austria) Arminen
	Report

15 February 2020
10:15

Minsk (Belarus)	0–5	(Germany) Düsseldorfer HC
	Report

=== Fifth to eighth place classification ===
==== Pool C ====
The points obtained in the preliminary round against the other team were taken over.

Pos	Team	Pld	W	D	L	GF	GA	GD	Pts	Relegation
5	(Russia) Dinamo Elektrostal	3	3	0	0	17	7	+10	15	
6	(Spain) Club de Campo	3	1	1	1	7	4	+3	8	
7	(England) East Grinstead	3	1	1	1	7	11	−4	7	EuroHockey Club Trophy
8	(Austria) Arminen	3	0	0	3	2	11	−9	1	EuroHockey Club Trophy

Source: EHF
Rules for classification: 1) points; 2) matches won; 3) goal difference; 4) goals for; 5) head-to-head result.

15 February 2020
16:30

East Grinstead (England)	4–1	(Austria) Arminen
	Report

15 February 2020
17:45

Club de Campo (Spain)	3–4	(Russia) Dinamo Elektrostal
	Report

16 February 2020
09:30

Club de Campo (Spain)	4–0	(Austria) Arminen
	Report

16 February 2020
10:45

Dinamo Elektrostal (Russia)	10–3	(England) East Grinstead
	Report

=== First to fourth place classification ===
Semi-finals
15 February
(Netherlands) HDM	6
(Belarus) Minsk	3
15 February
(Germany) Düsseldorfer HC	3
(Ukraine) Sumchanka	2

Final
16 February
(Netherlands) HDM	2
(Germany) Düsseldorfer HC	4
Third place
16 February
(Belarus) Minsk	5
(Ukraine) Sumchanka	6

==== Semi-finals ====
15 February 2020
19:00

HDM (Netherlands)	6–3	(Belarus) Minsk
	Report

15 February 2020
20:30

Düsseldorfer HC (Germany)	3–2	(Ukraine) Sumchanka
	Report

==== Third place game ====
16 February 2020
12:15

Minsk (Belarus)	5–6	(Ukraine) Sumchanka
	Report

==== Final ====
16 February 2020
13:45

HDM (Netherlands)	2–4	(Germany) Düsseldorfer HC
	Report

== Final standings ==
Rank	Team
1st place, gold medalist(s)	(Germany) Düsseldorfer HC
2nd place, silver medalist(s)	(Netherlands) HDM
3rd place, bronze medalist(s)	(Ukraine) Sumchanka
4	(Belarus) Minsk
5	(Russia) Dinamo Elektrostal
6	(Spain) Club de Campo
7	(England) East Grinstead
8	(Austria) Arminen

Relegated to the EuroHockey Indoor Club Trophy

== See also ==
- 2020 Euro Hockey League Women
- 2020 Men's EuroHockey Indoor Club Cup
