= Harvestehuder THC =

German sports club

- Full name: Harvestehuder Tennis und Hockey-Club e. V.
- Short name: HTHC
- League: Men's Bundesliga; Women's Bundesliga
- Founded: 15 May 1919; 107 years ago
- Website: Club website
Home	Away

Harvestehuder Tennis und Hockey-Club e. V., also known as Harvestehuder THC or simply HTHC, is a German professional sports club based in Winterhude, Hamburg. It is best known for its field hockey department but it also has tennis and lacrosse sections.

The club was founded in 1919 by the merger of the tennis club, founded in 1891, and the hockey club, founded in 1904.

== Honours ==
=== Men ===
Bundesliga

- Winners (4): 1995–96, 1997–98, 1999–2000, 2013–14
- Runners-up (4): 1962–93, 1992–93, 1993–94, 1998–99

DHB-Pokal

- Winners (1): 1997

Euro Hockey League

- Winners (1): 2013–14

EuroHockey Club Champions Cup

- Runners-up (1): 1997

EuroHockey Cup Winners Cup

- Winners (1): 1995

Indoor Bundesliga

- Winners (6): 1993–94, 1995–96, 2012–13, 2014–15, 2022–23, 2024–25
- Runners-up (4): 1994–95, 1996–97, 2004–05, 2009–10

EuroHockey Indoor Club Cup

- Winners (5): 1997, 1998, 2014, 2016, 2024
- Runners-up (2): 1995, 2026

=== Women ===
Bundesliga

- Winners (14): 1941–42, 1942–43, 1943–44, 1949–50, 1950–51, 1956–57, 1957–58, 1958–59, 1959–60, 1961–62, 1963–64, 1967–68, 1970–71, 1972–73
- Runners-up (4): 1951–52, 1952–53, 1965–66, 1969–70

EuroHockey Club Champions Cup

- Winners (1): 1974

Indoor Bundesliga

- Winners (1): 2006–07
- Runners-up (1): 2016–17

EuroHockey Indoor Club Cup

- Winners (1): 2008

== Current squad ==
=== Men's squad ===
As of 2024–25

No.	Pos.	Nation	Player
2	FW	AUS	Craig Marais
3	DF	AUS	Corey Weyer
4	FW	AUT	Fülöp Losonci
5	DF	GER	Kilian Pöhling
7	MF	SCO	Andrew McConnell
8	FW	GER	Julian Graupner
10	FW	GER	Alec von Schwerin
11	DF	GER	Philip Lieser
12	MF	GER	Anton Pöhling
14	DF	GER	Tom Schneider
16	FW	RSA	Nqobile Ntuli
17	FW	AUT	Moritz Frey
18	GK	GER	Anton Brinckman
19	DF	GER	Titus Wex

No.	Pos.	Nation	Player
22	MF	GER	Felix Glander
23	MF	RSA	Nicholas Spooner (Captain)
24	GK	GER	Simon Reich
26	MF	GER	Bent Kranz
27	DF	GER	Vincent Scholz
28	MF	GER	Jost van Below
29	DF	GER	Moritz Pfähler
31	FW	POL	Gracjan Jarzyński
32	GK	GER	Maximilian Cohrs
33	DF	GER	Lasse Georgi
34	MF	SUI	Jonathan Baumbach
55	FW	GER	Jonas von Gersum
77	GK	GER	Jasper Ditzer

=== Women's squad ===
As of 2022–23

No.	Pos.	Nation	Player
4	DF	CHI	Denise Krimerman
5	MF	GER	Emilia Landshut
6	FW	GER	Marleen Müller
8	DF	GER	Laura Saenger
11	FW	GER	Henriette Schlüter
12	DF	GER	Fenja Oppe
13	MF	GER	Teresa Martin-Pelegrina
14	FW	FRA	Sarah Pyrtek
17	FW	AUT	Katharina Bauer
18	DF	GER	Antonia Di Racca
21	FW	GER	Ori Gallitrico

No.	Pos.	Nation	Player
25	MF	FRA	Albane Garot
26	MF	GER	Franzisca Hauke
27	FW	GER	Lotte Nafzger
28	MF	GER	Antonia Landgrebe
31	FW	GER	Thekla Schlawin
32	GK	GER	Rosa Krüger
33	MF	GER	Katharina Kiefer
38	DF	GER	Marisa Martin Pelegrina
44	FW	GER	Maren Kiefer
55	FW	GER	Isabel von Gersum
61	GK	GER	Janina Georgi
