= 2017 Men's EuroHockey Club Trophy =

Tournament details
- Host country: Russia
- City: Elektrostal
- Dates: 2–5 June
- Teams: 8 (from 7 associations)

Final positions
- Champions: (Switzerland) Rotweiss Wettingen (2nd title)
- Runner-up: (Austria) Arminen
- Third place: (Russia) Dinamo Elektrostal

Tournament statistics
- Matches played: 16
- Goals scored: 72 (4.5 per match)
- Top scorer: (Austria) Dominik Monghy (5 goals)

The 2017 Men's EuroHockey Club Trophy was the 41st edition of the men's EuroHockey Club Trophy, Europe's secondary club field hockey tournament organized by the European Hockey Federation. It was held from 2 to 5 June 2017 in Elektrostal, Russia.

Rotweiss Wettingen won their second title by defeating Arminen 1–0 in the final. The hosts Dinamo Elektrostal won the bronze medal by defeating Grove Menzieshill 4–0.

== Qualified teams ==
The following eight teams with the following seeding participated in the tournament.

1. (Russia) Dinamo Elektrostal
2. (Austria) Arminen
3. (Scotland) Grove Menzieshill
4. (Czech Republic) Slavia Prague
5. (Switzerland) Rotweiss Wettingen
6. (Italy) Paolo Bonomi
7. (Austria) AHTC Wien
8. (Belarus) Minsk

== Preliminary round ==
=== Pool A ===
Pos	Team	Pld	W	D	L	GF	GA	GD	Pts	Qualification
1	(Switzerland) Rotweiss Wettingen	3	2	1	0	6	4	+2	12	Final
2	(Russia) Dinamo Elektrostal (H)	3	2	0	1	7	4	+3	11	Third place game
3	(Belarus) Minsk	3	0	2	1	4	6	−2	5	Fifth place game
4	(Czech Republic) Slavia Prague	3	0	1	2	5	8	−3	4	Seventh place game

Source: EHF
Rules for classification: 1) points; 2) matches won; 3) goal difference; 4) goals for; 5) head-to-head result; 6) field goals for.
(H) Hosts

2 June 2017
15:30

Slavia Prague (Czech Republic)	2–2	(Belarus) Minsk
	Report

2 June 2017
17:45

Dinamo Elektrostal (Russia)	1–2	(Switzerland) Rotweiss Wettingen
	Report

3 June 2017
14:30

Rotweiss Wettingen (Switzerland)	1–1	(Belarus) Minsk
	Report

3 June 2017
16:45

Slavia Prague (Czech Republic)	1–3	(Russia) Dinamo Elektrostal
	Report

4 June 2017
14:30

Rotweiss Wettingen (Switzerland)	3–2	(Czech Republic) Slavia Prague
	Report

4 June 2017
16:45

Dinamo Elektrostal (Russia)	3–1	(Belarus) Minsk
	Report

=== Pool B ===
Pos	Team	Pld	W	D	L	GF	GA	GD	Pts	Qualification
1	(Austria) Arminen	3	3	0	0	12	6	+6	15	Final
2	(Scotland) Grove Menzieshill	3	2	0	1	10	5	+5	11	Third place game
3	(Austria) AHTC Wien	3	1	0	2	11	16	−5	5	Fifth place game
4	(Italy) Paolo Bonomi	3	0	0	3	2	8	−6	2	Seventh place game

Source: EHF
Rules for classification: 1) points; 2) matches won; 3) goal difference; 4) goals for; 5) head-to-head result; 6) field goals for.

2 June 2017
11:00

Grove Menzieshill (Scotland)	6–2	(Austria) AHTC Wien
	Report

2 June 2017
13:15

Arminen (Austria)	1–0	(Italy) Paolo Bonomi
	Report

3 June 2017
10:00

Paolo Bonomi (Italy)	1–4	(Austria) AHTC Wien
	Report

3 June 2017
12:15

Grove Menzieshill (Scotland)	1–2	(Austria) Arminen
	Report

4 June 2017
10:00

Paolo Bonomi (Italy)	1–3	(Scotland) Grove Menzieshill
	Report

4 June 2017
12:15

Arminen (Austria)	9–5	(Austria) AHTC Wien
	Report

== Classification round ==
=== Seventh place game ===
5 June 2017
09:00

Slavia Prague (Czech Republic)	1–3	(Italy) Paolo Bonomi
	Report

=== Fifth place game ===
5 June 2017
11:15

Minsk (Belarus)	5–1	(Austria) AHTC Wien
	Report

=== Third place game ===
5 June 2017
13:30

Dinamo Elektrostal (Russia)	4–0	(Scotland) Grove Menzieshill
	Report

=== Final ===
5 June 2017
15:45

Rotweiss Wettingen (Switzerland)	1–0	(Austria) Arminen
	Report

== Final standings ==
1. (Switzerland) Rotweiss Wettingen
2. (Austria) Arminen
3. (Russia) Dinamo Elektrostal
4. (Scotland) Grove Menzieshill
5. (Belarus) Minsk
6. (Austria) AHTC Wien
7. (Italy) Paolo Bonomi
8. (Czech Republic) Slavia Prague

== See also ==
- 2016–17 Euro Hockey League
- 2017 Women's EuroHockey Club Trophy
