= Marco Miltkau =

German field hockey player (born 1990)

Personal information
- Born: 18 August 1990 (age 36) Hamburg, Germany

Sport
- Sport: Field hockey
- Position: Forward
Senior career
| Years | Team | Caps | Goals |
| – | Braunschweiger THC | - | - |
| –2012 | UHC Hamburg | - | - |
| 2012–2019 | Rot-Weiss Köln | - | - |
| 2019–2020 | Gantoise | - | - |
| 2020–2025 | Klein Zwitserland | - | - |
| 2025–2026 | Bloemendaal | - | - |
National team
| Years | Team | Caps | Goals |
| 2009–2024 | Germany | 160 | (73) |
| 2018 | Germany (indoor) | 8 | (11) |
Medal record
Representing Germany
Men's field hockey
Olympic Games
| Silver medal – second place | 2024 Paris | Team |
FIH Hockey World Cup
| Gold medal – first place | 2023 Bhubaneswar–Rourkela |
EuroHockey Championship
| Gold medal – first place | 2013 Boom |
| Silver medal – second place | 2015 London |
Champions Trophy
| Bronze medal – third place | 2016 London |
Junior World Cup
| Gold medal – first place | 2009 Johor Bahru–Singapore |
EuroHockey Junior Championship
| Bronze medal – third place | 2010 Siemianowice Śląski |
Men's indoor hockey
Indoor World Cup
| Silver medal – second place | 2018 Berlin |

Marco Miltkau (born 18 August 1990) is a German former field hockey player who played as a forward. He played 160 matches for the German national team from 2009 to 2024 and scored 73 goals.

== Personal life ==
Marco Miltkau was born and raised in Hamburg, Germany. He started playing hockey at the age of four, introduced to the sport by his father who was a well known coach.

== Club career ==
Miltkau played for Braunschweiger THC and UHC Hamburg in the German Bundesliga. In 2012 he switched from UHC Hamburg to Rot-Weiss Köln. In 2019 he left Germany to play for La Gantoise in the Men's Belgian Hockey League. In June 2020, it was announced he joined Klein Zwitserland in the Dutch Hoofdklasse for the 2020–21 season. During his final season of his career, he played for Bloemendaal during the 2025-26 season.

== International career ==
=== Indoor ===
Miltkau played for the German indoor team at the 2018 Indoor World Cup in Berlin, Germany. The team won a silver medal at the tournament.

=== Outdoor ===
In 2012, Miltkau debuted for the senior national team. Shortly after he played in his first major tournament at the Champions Trophy in Melbourne, Australia. Since his debut, He has been a regular inclusion in the national side. During his career he has medalled three times with the national team; gold and silver at the 2013 and 2015 Men's EuroHockey Championships respectively, and bronze at the 2016 Champions Trophy. He represented Germany in the inaugural tournament of the FIH Pro League from January–June 2019. After the 2024 Summer Olympics, where Germany won the silver medal, he announced his retirement from the national team.

== Honours ==
=== Club ===
UHC Hamburg

- Euro Hockey League: 2009–10, 2011–12

Rot-Weiss Köln

- Bundesliga: 2012–13, 2014–15, 2015–16
- Euro Hockey League: 2016–17
- EuroHockey Indoor Club Cup: 2013, 2018

Klein Zwitserland

- Gold Cup: 2021–22

=== National team ===
Germany U21

- Junior World Cup: 2009

Germany

- Summer Olympics silver medal: 2024
- FIH Hockey World Cup: 2023
- EuroHockey Championship: 2013
