= Benedikt Fürk =

German field hockey player

Personal information
- Born: 20 October 1988 (age 37)
- Height: 1.73 m (5 ft 8 in)
- Weight: 72 kg (159 lb)

Sport
- Sport: Field hockey
- Position: Defender / Midfielder
- Club: Uhlenhorst Mülheim
National team
Years	Team	Caps	Goals
2010–present	Germany	178	(7)
Medal record
Men's field hockey
Representing Germany
EuroHockey Championship
Gold medal – first place	2011 Mönchengladbach
Gold medal – first place	2013 Boom
Silver medal – second place	2015 London
Silver medal – second place	2021 Amstelveen
Champions Trophy
Bronze medal – third place	2016 London
Junior World Cup
Gold medal – first place	2009 Johor Bahru–Singapore
EuroHockey Junior Championship
Bronze medal – third place	2008 San Sebastián
- Updated on 24 July 2021

Benedikt Fürk (born 20 October 1988) is a German field hockey player who plays as a defender or midfielder for Uhlenhorst Mülheim and the German national team.

== International career ==
Fürk made his debut for the senior national team in May 2010 against Poland. In November 2018, he was selected in the Germany squad for the 2018 World Cup. After the game against Malaysia he got an injury and had to withdraw from the tournament. On 28 May 2021, he was named in the squads for the 2021 EuroHockey Championship and the 2020 Summer Olympics.

== Honours ==
=== Club ===
Uhlenhorst Mülheim

- Bundesliga: 2017–18, 2018–19
- Indoor Bundesliga: 2013–14, 2015–16
- EuroHockey Indoor Club Cup: 2015, 2017

=== International ===
Germany

- EuroHockey Championship: 2011, 2013

Germany U21

- Junior World Cup: 2009
