= 2015 Men's EuroHockey Indoor Club Champions Cup =

International indoor hockey competition

Tournament details
- Host country: Germany
- City: Mülheim
- Dates: 13–15 February
- Teams: 8 (from 8 associations)
- Venue: Innogy Sporthalle

Final positions
- Champions: (Germany) Uhlenhorst Mülheim (1st title)
- Runner-up: (Austria) Arminen
- Third place: (Spain) Complutense

Tournament statistics
- Matches played: 20
- Goals scored: 174 (8.7 per match)
- Top scorer: (Sweden) Karl Hemvik (9 goals)

The 2015 Men's EuroHockey Indoor Club Champions Cup was the 26th edition of the Men's EuroHockey Indoor Club Champions Cup, Europe's premier men's club indoor hockey tournament organized by the European Hockey Federation. It was held at the Innogy Sporthalle in Mülheim, Germany from 13 to 15 February 2015.

The hosts Uhlenhorst Mülheim won its first title by defeating Arminen 5–4 in the final, Complutense took the bronze medal and Dinamo Stroitel and Namur were relegated to the Trophy division.

== Teams ==
Pool	Teams	
A	(Germany) Uhlenhorst Mülheim	(Spain) Complutense
A	(England) East Grinstead	(Switzerland) Rotweis Wettingen
B	(Russia) Dinamo Stroitel	(Belgium) Namur
B	(Sweden) Partille	(Austria) Arminen

== Preliminary round ==
=== Pool A ===
Pos	Team	Pld	W	D	L	GF	GA	GD	Pts	Qualification
1	(Germany) Uhlenhorst Mülheim (H)	3	3	0	0	22	10	+12	15	Semi-finals
2	(Spain) Complutense	3	1	0	2	8	10	−2	6	Semi-finals
3	(England) East Grinstead	3	1	0	2	12	17	−5	5	Pool C
4	(Switzerland) Rotweiss Wettingen	3	1	0	2	8	13	−5	5	Pool C

Source: EHF
(H) Hosts

13 February 2015
10:30

Uhlenhorst Mülheim (Germany)	11–5	(England) East Grinstead
Herzbruch 5', 26'; Nitschle 11'; Stralkowski 18', 35', 36'; Keusgen 20', 22'; Fleckhaus 27'; Matania 33'; Fürk 33'	Report	Kirkham 19'; Griffiths 21', 39'; Faulkner 30'; Piper 36'

Umpires:
Roel van Eert (NED)
Michaël Pontus (BEL)

13 February 2015
11:40

Complutense (Spain)	3–2	(Switzerland) Rotweiss Wettingen
San Martin 18'; De Frutos 24'; Sánchez 40'	Report	N. Steffen 20', 30'

Umpires:
Oliver Tarnoczi (AUT)
Mikhail Golovanov (RUS)

13 February 2015
15:30

East Grinstead (England)	3–4	(Switzerland) Rotweiss Wettingen
Griffiths 15', 16'; Faulkner 19'	Report	B. Messerli 5', 20+'; Schröter 22'; Steimer 40'

Umpires:
Oliver Tarnoczi (AUT)
Nicklas Stenberg (SWE)

13 February 2015
16:40

Complutense (Spain)	3–4	(Germany) Uhlenhorst Mülheim
Sánchez 7'; Álvarez-Villabol 16'; San Martin 34'	Report	Nitschke 11'; Stralkowski 29', 40'; Herzbruch 33'

Umpires:
Michaël Pontus (BEL)
Mikhail Golovanov (RUS)

14 February 2015
09:00

Uhlenhorst Mülheim (Germany)	7–2	(Switzerland) Rotweiss Wettingen
	Report

14 February 2015
10:10

East Grinstead (England)	4–2	(Spain) Complutense
	Report

=== Pool B ===
Pos	Team	Pld	W	D	L	GF	GA	GD	Pts	Qualification
1	(Austria) Arminen	3	3	0	0	15	8	+7	15	Semi-finals
2	(Sweden) Partille	3	1	0	2	10	11	−1	6	Semi-finals
3	(Russia) Dinamo Stroitel	3	1	0	2	10	13	−3	5	Pool C
4	(Belgium) Namur	3	1	0	2	10	13	−3	5	Pool C

Source: EHF

13 February 2015
12:50

Dinamo Stroitel (Russia)	4–2	(Sweden) Partille
	Report

13 February 2015
14:00

Namur (Belgium)	3–4	(Austria) Arminen
	Report

13 February 2015
17:50

Partille (Sweden)	2–4	(Austria) Arminen
	Report

13 February 2015
19:00

Namur (Belgium)	4–3	(Russia) Dinamo Stroitel
	Report

14 February 2015
11:20

Dinamo Stroitel (Russia)	3–7	(Austria) Arminen
	Report

14 February 2015
12:30

Partille (Sweden)	6–3	(Belgium) Namur
	Report

== Fifth to eighth place classification ==
=== Pool C ===
The points obtained in the preliminary round against the other team are taken over.

Pos	Team	Pld	W	D	L	GF	GA	GD	Pts	Relegation
5	(Switzerland) Rotweiss Wettingen	3	3	0	0	19	9	+10	15	
6	(England) East Grinstead	3	1	1	1	17	13	+4	8	
7	(Belgium) Namur (R)	3	1	1	1	13	15	−2	7	EuroHockey Club Trophy
8	(Russia) Dinamo Stroitel (R)	3	0	0	3	9	21	−12	1	EuroHockey Club Trophy

Source: EHF
(R) Relegated

14 February 2015
15:30

Rotweiss Wettingen (Switzerland)	6–3	(Belgium) Namur
	Report

14 February 2015
16:40

East Grinstead (England)	8–3	(Russia) Dinamo Stroitel
	Report

15 February 2015
10:00

Rotweiss Wettingen (Switzerland)	9–3	(Russia) Dinamo Stroitel
	Report

15 February 2015
11:10

East Grinstead (England)	6–6	(Belgium) Namur
	Report

== First to fourth place classification ==
=== Bracket ===
Semi-finals
14 February
(Spain) Complutense	3
(Austria) Arminen	5
14 February
(Germany) Uhlenhorst Mülheim	9
(Sweden) Partille	1

Final
15 February
(Austria) Arminen	4
(Germany) Uhlenhorst Mülheim	5
Third place
15 February
(Spain) Complutense	5
(Sweden) Partille	3

=== Semi-finals ===
14 February 2015
17:50

Complutense (Spain)	3–5	(Austria) Arminen
	Report

14 February 2015
19:15

Uhlenhorst Mülheim (Germany)	9–1	(Sweden) Partille
	Report

=== Third and fourth place ===
15 February 2015
13:00

Complutense (Spain)	5–3	(Sweden) Partille
	Report

=== Final ===
15 February 2015
14:30

Arminen (Austria)	4–5	(Germany) Uhlenhorst Mülheim
	Report

== Statistics ==
=== Final standings ===
Pos	Team	Relegation
1	(Germany) Uhlenhorst Mülheim (H)	
2	(Austria) Arminen	
3	(Spain) Complutense	
4	(Sweden) Partille	
5	(Switzerland) Rotweiss Wettingen	
6	(England) East Grinstead	
7	(Belgium) Namur	EuroHockey Club Trophy
8	(Russia) Dinamo Stroitel	EuroHockey Club Trophy

Source: EHF
(H) Host

=== Top goalscorers ===
As of 15 February 2016

Rank	Player	Team	FG	PC	PS	Goals
1	(Sweden) Karl Hemvik	(Sweden) Partille	3	5	1	9
2	(Switzerland) Nicolas Steffen	(Switzerland) Rotweiss Wettingen	3	1	4	8
2	(Austria) Dominic Uher	(Austria) Arminen	2	6	0	8
4	(Germany) Tobias Matania	(Germany) Uhlenhorst Mülheim	6	1	0	7
4	(Germany) Thilo Stralkowski	(Germany) Uhlenhorst Mülheim	3	2	2	7
6	(Spain) Ricardo Sánchez	(Spain) Complutense	6	0	0	6
6	(Belgium) Gilles Jacob	(Belgium) Namur	4	2	0	6
6	(Germany) Ole Keusgen	(Germany) Uhlenhorst Mülheim	3	3	0	6
9	(Russia) Aleksandr Lykov	(Russia) Dinamo Stroitel	4	1	0	5
9	(England) David Condon	(England) East Grinstead	4	1	0	5
9	(England) Chris Griffiths	(England) East Grinstead	4	1	0	5

== See also ==
- 2014–15 Euro Hockey League
