= 2017 Men's EuroHockey Indoor Club Cup =

International indoor hockey competition

Tournament details
- Host country: Austria
- City: Vienna
- Dates: 10–12 February
- Teams: 8 (from 8 associations)
- Venue: Wiener Stadthalle

Final positions
- Champions: (Germany) Uhlenhorst Mülheim (2nd title)
- Runner-up: (Austria) Arminen
- Third place: (Netherlands) Amsterdam

Tournament statistics
- Matches played: 20
- Goals scored: 146 (7.3 per match)
- Top scorer: (Germany) Timm Herzbruch (9 goals)

The 2017 Men's EuroHockey Indoor Club Cup was the 28th edition of the Men's EuroHockey Indoor Club Cup, Europe's premier club indoor hockey tournament organized by the EHF. It was held from 10 to 12 February 2017 in the Wiener Stadthalle in Vienna, Austria.

Uhlenhorst Mülheim won their second title by defeating the hosts Arminen 3–2 in the final, Amsterdam took the bronze medal and Grunwald Poznań and Partille were relegated to the Trophy division.

== Teams ==
Participating clubs have qualified based on their country's final ranking from the 2016 competition (Host is highlighted in bold).

Pool A	Pool B
(Germany) Uhlenhorst Mülheim	**(Austria) Arminen**
(England) East Grinstead	(Sweden) Partille
(Poland) Grunwald Poznań	(Spain) Complutense
(Russia) Dinamo Stroitel	(Netherlands) Amsterdam

== Results ==
All times are local, CET (UTC+1).

=== Preliminary round ===
==== Pool A ====
Pos	Team	Pld	W	D	L	GF	GA	GD	Pts	Qualification
1	(Germany) Uhlenhorst Mülheim	3	3	0	0	27	9	+18	**15**	Semi-finals
2	(England) East Grinstead	3	1	1	1	12	18	−6	**7**	Semi-finals
3	(Russia) Dinamo Stroitel	3	1	0	2	11	19	−8	**6**	Pool C
4	(Poland) Grunwald Poznań	3	0	1	2	12	16	−4	**4**	Pool C

Source: EHF

10 February 2017
09:00

East Grinstead (England)	6–4	(Russia) Dinamo Stroitel
	Report

10 February 2017
10:10

Uhlenhorst Mülheim (Germany)	7–5	(Poland) Grunwald Poznań
	Report

10 February 2017
15:00

Grunwald Poznań (Poland)	3–5	(Russia) Dinamo Stroitel
	Report

10 February 2017
16:00

East Grinstead (England)	2–10	(Germany) Uhlenhorst Mülheim
	Report

11 February 2017
09:00

Grunwald Poznań (Poland)	4–4	(England) East Grinstead
	Report

11 February 2017
10:10

Uhlenhorst Mülheim (Germany)	10–2	(Russia) Dinamo Stroitel
	Report

==== Pool B ====
Pos	Team	Pld	W	D	L	GF	GA	GD	Pts	Qualification
1	(Austria) Arminen (H)	3	2	1	0	10	6	+4	**12**	Semi-finals
2	(Netherlands) Amsterdam	3	1	1	1	8	8	0	**8**	Semi-finals
3	(Sweden) Partille	3	1	1	1	6	6	0	**8**	Pool C
4	(Spain) Complutense	3	0	1	2	10	14	−4	**3**	Pool C

Source: EHF
(H) Hosts

10 February 2017
11:20

Partille (Sweden)	2–1	(Netherlands) Amsterdam
	Report

10 February 2017
12:30

Arminen (Austria)	6–3	(Spain) Complutense
	Report

10 February 2017
17:20

Complutense (Spain)	4–5	(Netherlands) Amsterdam
	Report

10 February 2017
18:30

Partille (Sweden)	1–2	(Austria) Arminen
	Report

11 February 2017
11:20

Complutense (Spain)	3–3	(Sweden) Partille
	Report

11 February 2017
12:30

Arminen (Austria)	2–2	(Netherlands) Amsterdam
	Report

=== Fifth to eighth place classification ===
==== Pool C ====
The points obtained in the preliminary round against the other team are taken over.

Pos	Team	Pld	W	D	L	GF	GA	GD	Pts	Relegation
5	(Russia) Dinamo Stroitel	3	1	2	0	10	8	+2	**9**	
6	(Spain) Complutense	3	1	2	0	8	7	+1	**9**	
7	(Poland) Grunwald Poznań (R)	3	1	0	2	10	12	−2	**7**	EuroHockey Club Trophy
8	(Sweden) Partille (R)	3	0	2	1	10	11	−1	**5**	EuroHockey Club Trophy

Source: EHF
(R) Relegated

11 February 2017
16:00

Grunwald Poznań (Poland)	3–4	(Spain) Complutense
	Report

11 February 2017
17:10

Dinamo Stroitel (Russia)	4–4	(Sweden) Partille
	Report

12 February 2017
10:00

Partille (Sweden)	3–4	(Poland) Grunwald Poznań
	Report

12 February 2017
11:10

Dinamo Stroitel (Russia)	1–1	(Spain) Complutense
	Report

=== First to fourth place classification ===
Semi-finals
11 February
**(Germany) Uhlenhorst Mülheim**	**6**
(Netherlands) Amsterdam	4
11 February
**(Austria) Arminen**	**3**
(England) East Grinstead	2

Final
12 February
**(Germany) Uhlenhorst Mülheim**	**3**
(Austria) Arminen	2
Third place
12 February
**(Netherlands) Amsterdam**	**4**
(England) East Grinstead	2

==== Semi-finals ====
11 February 2017
18:30

Uhlenhorst Mülheim (Germany)	6–4	(Netherlands) Amsterdam
	Report

11 February 2017
20:00

Arminen (Austria)	3–2	(England) East Grinstead
	Report

==== Third place game ====
12 February 2017
13:00

Amsterdam (Netherlands)	4–2	(England) East Grinstead
	Report

==== Final ====
12 February 2017
14:30

Uhlenhorst Mülheim (Germany)	3–2	(Austria) Arminen
	Report

== Statistics ==
=== Final standings ===
Pos	Team	Relegation
1	(Germany) Uhlenhorst Mülheim	
2	(Austria) Arminen (H)	
3	(Netherlands) Amsterdam	
4	(England) East Grinstead	
5	(Russia) Dinamo Stroitel	
6	(Spain) Complutense	
7	(Poland) Grunwald Poznań	EuroHockey Club Trophy
8	(Sweden) Partille	EuroHockey Club Trophy

Source: EHF
(H) Host

=== Top goalscorers ===
Rank	Player	Team	Goals
1	(Germany) Timm Herzbruch	(Germany) Uhlenhorst Mülheim	9
2	(Germany) Thilo Stralkowski	(Germany) Uhlenhorst Mülheim	8
2	(Netherlands) Robert Tigges	(Netherlands) Amsterdam	8
4	(Switzerland) Andrin Rickli	(Spain) Complutense	7
4	(Germany) Lukas Windfeder	(Germany) Uhlenhorst Mülheim	7
6	(Poland) Artur Mikula	(Poland) Grunwald Poznań	5
7	(England) Ben Allberry	(England) East Grinstead	4
7	(Sweden) Joakim Björkman	(Sweden) Partille	4
7	(Russia) Artem Borisov	(Russia) Dinamo Stroitel	4
10	3 players		3

== See also ==
- 2016–17 Euro Hockey League
