= SV Arminen =

Arminen
- Full name: Sportvereinigung Arminen Wien
- League: Austrian Bundesliga
- Founded: 24 April 1919; 106 years ago
- Home ground: Waldstadion, Vienna
- Website: Club website
Home	Away

Sportvereinigung Arminen Wien also known as SV Arminen or simply Arminen is an Austrian professional field hockey club based in Vienna. It competes in the Austrian Bundesliga which they have won a record 19 times in the men's competition. Their home ground is the Waldstadion and they were founded on 24 April 1919.

The first men's team regularly plays in the Euro Hockey League. In the past, the club also had other sports but since 1938 they only have hockey.

== Honours ==
=== Men ===
Austrian Bundesliga

- Winners (20): 1945–46, 1946–47, 1947–48, 1948–49, 1950–51, 1952–53, 1976, 1980, 1983, 1985, 1986, 1987, 1988, 2012–13, 2013–14, 2015–16, 2016–17, 2017–18, 2018–19, 2021–22

EuroHockey Club Trophy

- Runners-up (2): 1988, 2017

Austrian Indoor Bundesliga

- Winners (27): 1975, 1976, 1977, 1978, 1979, 1980, 1981, 1982, 1983, 1984, 1985, 1986, 1987, 1988, 1989, 2002–03, 2004–05, 2005–06, 2010–11, 2012–13, 2013–14, 2014–15, 2015–16, 2016–17, 2017–18, 2018–19, 2022–23

EuroHockey Indoor Club Cup

- Runners-up (6): 2007, 2015, 2016, 2017, 2019, 2020

EuroHockey Indoor Club Trophy

- Winners (1): 2014
- Runners-up (1): 2004

=== Women ===
Austrian Bundesliga

- Winners (20): 1948–49, 1957–58, 1978, 1981, 1982, 1983, 1984, 1985, 1986, 1987, 1992, 1998–99, 2002–03, 2011–12, 2012–13, 2013–14, 2014–15, 2015–16, 2016–17, 2017–18

Austrian Indoor Bundesliga

- Winners (21): 1958–59, 1980, 1983, 1984, 1985, 1986, 1987, 1988, 1989, 1992, 1997–98, 2009–10, 2010–11, 2011–12, 2013–14, 2014–15, 2015–16, 2016–17, 2017–18, 2018–19, 2019–20

EuroHockey Indoor Club Trophy

- Winners (3): 2011, 2015, 2019

EuroHockey Cup Winners Trophy

- Winners (1): 1992
