= HTC Uhlenhorst Mülheim =

Uhlenhorst Mülheim
- Full name: Hockey- und Tennisclub Uhlenhorst e.V. Mülheim
- League: Men's Bundesliga; Women's Bundesliga
- Founded: 20 August 1920; 105 years ago
- Home ground: Waldstadion, Mülheim (Capacity 1000)
- Website: Club website
Home	Away

Hockey- und Tennisclub Uhlenhorst e.V. Mülheim, also known as HTC Uhlenhorst Mülheim, is a German professional field hockey club based in Mülheim, North Rhine-Westphalia. They are one of the most successful German field hockey clubs having won nine European titles between 1988 and 1996. They have also won the most Bundesliga titles with 18.

== Honours ==
=== Men ===
Bundesliga

- Winners (18): 1949–50, 1953–54, 1954–55, 1956–57, 1957–58, 1959–60, 1963–64, 1984–85, 1985–86, 1986–87, 1987–88, 1989–90, 1990–91, 1993–94, 1994–95, 1996–97, 2017–18, 2018–19
- Runners-up (10): 1950–51, 1952–53, 1958–59, 1960–61, 1988–89, 1991–92, 1995–96, 2010–11, 2012–13, 2019–2021

EuroHockey Club Champions Cup

- Winners (9): 1988, 1989, 1990, 1991, 1992, 1993, 1994, 1995, 1996
- Runners-up (1): 1986

Indoor Bundesliga

- Winners (3): 1986–87, 2013–14, 2015–16
- Runners-up (2): 1984–85, 2012–13

EuroHockey Indoor Club Cup

- Winners (2): 2015, 2017

=== Women ===
Indoor Bundesliga

- Runners-up (1): 2014–15

== Current squad ==
=== Men's squad ===
As of 2021–22

No.	Pos.	Nation	Player
1	GK	GER	Lennart Küppers
4	DF	GER	Ferdinand Weinke
5	DF	GER	Dennis Holthaus
6	DF	GER	Lukas Windfeder
7	FW	ARG	Lucas Toscani
8	MF	GER	Julius Meyer
9	FW	GER	Till Brock
12	DF	GER	Benedikt Fürk
13	MF	GER	Henrik Mertgens
14	FW	GER	Timm Herzbruch
15	FW	GER	Jannik Enaux
16	MF	GER	Robert Duckscheer
19	MF	GER	Jan Nitschke
20	DF	GER	Niklas Bosserhoff

No.	Pos.	Nation	Player
21	DF	GER	Philipp Noertersheuser
22	MF	GER	Jonas Seidemann
23	MF	GER	Max Godau
24	DF	GER	Nick Werner
25	DF	GER	Moritz Ludwig
26	FW	GER	Alec von Schwerin
27	MF	GER	Jan Schiffer
28	DF	GER	Michel Kammann
29	FW	GER	Malte Hellwig
30	GK	GER	Krischan Schliemann
31	DF	GER	Finn Müntefering
32	GK	GER	Felix Damberger
40	MF	GER	Henri Unger
—	FW	GER	Tim Söller

=== Women's squad ===
As of 2021–22

No.	Pos.	Nation	Player
2	FW	GER	Julia Hemmerle
4	MF	GER	Lara Brikner
6	GK	GER	Femke Jovy
7	FW	GER	Claire Engel
9	GK	GER	Finja Starck
10	DF	GER	Katharina Barth
11	FW	GER	Charlotte von Hülsen
12	GK	GER	Emily Schorde
15	FW	GER	Nika Hansen
16	DF	GER	Fee Mazkour
17	DF	GER	Marie Hahn
18	DF	GER	Carla Schrafen
19	FW	GER	Petra Ankenbrand

No.	Pos.	Nation	Player
20	FW	GER	Lynn Werker
21	FW	GER	Myrthe Hebert
22	DF	GER	Melanie Terber
23	FW	GER	Mia Rosser
24	DF	GER	Elena Clococeanu
25	MF	GER	Celina Franzen
28	MF	GER	Lynn Neuheuser
29	FW	GER	Emily Paula Bujna
32	DF	GER	Toni Luise Meister
41	DF	GER	Julia Reith
48	FW	GER	Maike Scheuer
99	GK	GER	Terese Correia
