= 2019 Men's EuroHockey Indoor Club Cup =

International indoor hockey competition

Tournament details
- Host country: Austria
- City: Vienna
- Dates: 15–17 February
- Teams: 8
- Venue: Wiener Stadthalle

Final positions
- Champions: (Sweden) Partille (1st title)
- Runner-up: (Austria) Arminen
- Third place: (Germany) UHC Hamburg

Tournament statistics
- Matches played: 20
- Goals scored: 174 (8.7 per match)
- Top scorer: (Germany) Moritz Fürste (18 goals)
- Best player: (Sweden) Joakim Björkman

The 2019 Men's EuroHockey Indoor Club Cup was the 30th edition of the Men's EuroHockey Indoor Club Cup, Europe's premier club indoor hockey tournament organized by the EHF. It was held from 15 to 17 February in the Wiener Stadthalle in Vienna, Austria.

Partille won their first title by defeating the hosts Arminen 3–1 in the final, UHC Hamburg took the bronze medal and Amsterdam and Rotweiss Wettingen were relegated to the Trophy division.

== Teams ==
Participating clubs have qualified based on their country's final ranking from the 2018 competition (Host is highlighted in bold).

Pool A	Pool B
(Germany) UHC Hamburg	(Belgium) Racing Club de Bruxelles
(Netherlands) Amsterdam	(Russia) Dinamo Stroitel
(Switzerland) Rotweiss Wettingen	**(Austria) Arminen**
(Sweden) Partille	(Belarus) Minsk

== Results ==
All times are local, CET (UTC+1).

=== Preliminary round ===
==== Pool A ====
Pos	Team	Pld	W	D	L	GF	GA	GD	Pts	Qualification
1	(Germany) UHC Hamburg	3	3	0	0	24	11	+13	**15**	Semi-finals
2	(Sweden) Partille	3	1	1	1	20	16	+4	**8**	Semi-finals
3	(Netherlands) Amsterdam	3	1	1	1	16	16	0	**8**	Pool C
4	(Switzerland) Rotweiss Wettingen	3	0	0	3	7	24	−17	**1**	Pool C

Source: EHF
Rules for classification: 1) points; 2) matches won; 3) goal difference; 4) goals for; 5) head-to-head result; 6) field goals scored.

15 February 2019
09:00

UHC Hamburg (Germany)	10–1	(Switzerland) Rotweiss Wettingen
	Report

15 February 2019
10:10

Amsterdam (Netherlands)	6–6	(Sweden) Partille
	Report

15 February 2019
15:00

Amsterdam (Netherlands)	4–6	(Germany) UHC Hamburg
	Report

15 February 2019
16:10

Rotweiss Wettingen (Switzerland)	2–8	(Sweden) Partille
	Report

16 February 2019
09:00

UHC Hamburg (Germany)	8–6	(Sweden) Partille
	Report

16 February 2019
10:10

Rotweiss Wettingen (Switzerland)	4–6	(Netherlands) Amsterdam
	Report

==== Pool B ====
Pos	Team	Pld	W	D	L	GF	GA	GD	Pts	Qualification
1	(Russia) Dinamo Stroitel	3	1	2	0	13	11	+2	**9**	Semi-finals
2	(Austria) Arminen (H)	3	1	2	0	12	11	+1	**9**	Semi-finals
3	(Belgium) Racing Club de Bruxelles	3	1	1	1	12	11	+1	**8**	Pool C
4	(Belarus) Minsk	3	0	1	2	9	13	−4	**3**	Pool C

Source: EHF
Rules for classification: 1) points; 2) matches won; 3) goal difference; 4) goals for; 5) head-to-head result; 6) field goals scored.
(H) Hosts

15 February 2019
11:20

Dinamo Stroitel (Russia)	3–3	(Belarus) Minsk
	Report

15 February 2019
12:30

Racing Club de Bruxelles (Belgium)	3–3	(Austria) Arminen
	Report

15 February 2019
17:20

Dinamo Stroitel (Russia)	5–3	(Belgium) Racing Club de Bruxelles
	Report

15 February 2019
18:30

Arminen (Austria)	4–3	(Belarus) Minsk
	Report

16 February 2019
11:20

Racing Club de Bruxelles (Belgium)	6–3	(Belarus) Minsk
	Report

16 February 2019
12:30

Arminen (Austria)	5–5	(Russia) Dinamo Stroitel
	Report

=== Fifth to eighth place classification ===
==== Pool C ====
The points obtained in the preliminary round against the other team are taken over.

Pos	Team	Pld	W	D	L	GF	GA	GD	Pts	Relegation
5	(Belarus) Minsk	3	2	0	1	15	14	+1	**10**	
6	(Belgium) Racing Club de Bruxelles	3	1	2	0	11	8	+3	**9**	
7	(Netherlands) Amsterdam (R)	3	1	1	1	15	14	+1	**8**	EuroHockey Club Trophy
8	(Switzerland) Rotweiss Wettingen (R)	3	0	1	2	8	13	−5	**3**	EuroHockey Club Trophy

Source: EHF
Rules for classification: 1) points; 2) matches won; 3) goal difference; 4) goals for; 5) head-to-head result; 6) field goals scored.
(R) Relegated

16 February 2019
16:30

Rotweiss Wettingen (Switzerland)	2–5	(Belarus) Minsk
	Report

16 February 2019
17:40

Amsterdam (Netherlands)	3–3	(Belgium) Racing Club de Bruxelles
	Report

17 February 2019
09:50

Amsterdam (Netherlands)	6–7	(Belarus) Minsk
	Report

17 February 2019
12:10

Racing Club de Bruxelles (Belgium)	2–2	(Switzerland) Rotweiss Wettingen
	Report

=== First to fourth place classification ===
Semi-finals
16 February
(Russia) Dinamo Stroitel	2
**(Sweden) Partille**	**4**
16 February
(Germany) UHC Hamburg	3 (2)
**(Austria) Arminen (p.s.o.)**	**3 (3)**

Final
17 February
**(Sweden) Partille**	**3**
(Austria) Arminen	1
Third place
17 February
(Russia) Dinamo Stroitel	6
**(Germany) UHC Hamburg**	**8**

==== Semi-finals ====
16 February 2019
18:50

Dinamo Stroitel (Russia)	3–4	(Sweden) Partille
	Report

16 February 2019
20:15

UHC Hamburg (Germany)	3–3	(Austria) Arminen
	Report
Penalties
	2–3

==== Third and fourth place ====
17 February 2019
11:30

Dinamo Stroitel (Russia)	6–8	(Germany) UHC Hamburg
	Report

==== Final ====
17 February 2019
14:30

Partille (Sweden)	3–1	(Austria) Arminen
	Report

== Statistics ==
=== Final standings ===
Rank	Team
1st place, gold medalist(s)	(Sweden) Partille
2nd place, silver medalist(s)	(Austria) Arminen
3rd place, bronze medalist(s)	(Germany) UHC Hamburg
4	(Russia) Dinamo Stroitel
5	(Belarus) Minsk
6	(Belgium) Racing Bruxelles
7	(Netherlands) Amsterdam
8	(Switzerland) Rotweiss Wettingen

Relegated to the EuroHockey Indoor Club Trophy

=== Top goalscorers ===
Rank	Player	Team	Goals
1	(Germany) Moritz Fürste	(Germany) Hamburg	18
2	(Sweden) Johan Björkman	(Sweden) Partille	14
3	(Belgium) Tom Boon	(Belgium) Racing Bruxelles	10
4	(Netherlands) Boris Burkhardt	(Netherlands) Amsterdam	9
5	(Belarus) Ivan Lutsevich	(Belarus) Minsk	8
5	(Austria) Florian Steyrer	(Austria) Arminen	8
7	(Russia) Dmitrii Azarov	(Russia) Dinamo Stroitel	7
8	(Belarus) Yauheni Mikheichyk	(Belarus) Minsk	6
9	6 players		5

=== Awards ===
The following individual awards were given at the conclusion of the tournament.

Player of the Tournament	Goalkeeper of the Tournament	Leading Goalscorer
(Sweden) Joakim Björkman	(Austria) Mateusz Szymczyk	(Germany) Moritz Fürste

== See also ==
- 2018–19 Euro Hockey League
