= Gareth Carr =

South African field hockey player

Medal record

Men's field hockey

Representing South Africa

Africa Cup of Nations
Gold medal – first place	2005 Pretoria	

Gareth Carr (born 4 November 1981) is a retired South African field hockey player. He was a defender who often scored from penalty corners.

Carr was a member of the South Africa squad that competed at the 2010 Hockey World Cup and the 2010 Commonwealth Games. He also competed in the Champions Challenge in 2005, 2009 and 2011, and the Hockey Africa Cup of Nations in 2005, 2009 and 2011. Carr retired from international hockey with 81 caps and 50 goals.

Carr was born in Durban. He has played club hockey in the UK for Holcombe, East Grinstead and Old Georgians.
