= Men's EuroHockey Indoor Club Cup =

Sporting tournament

- Current season, competition or edition: 2027 Men's EuroHockey Indoor Club Cup
- Formerly: Men's EuroHockey Indoor Club Champions Cup
- Sport: Indoor hockey
- Founded: 1990; 36 years ago
- First season: 1990
- No. of teams: 8
- Confederation: EHF (Europe)
- Most recent champion: (Netherlands) Amsterdam (1st title) (2026)
- Most titles: (Germany) Rot-Weiss Köln (9 titles)
- Level on pyramid: 1
- Relegation to: EuroHockey Indoor Club Trophy

The Men's EuroHockey Indoor Club Cup is an annual indoor hockey club competition organised by the EHF. It is the premier club tournament of Europe for indoor hockey and contested by the champions of the eight strongest EHF national associations.

German clubs have the highest number of victories (27 wins), followed by Poland (2 wins), a club from Spain, Russia, Netherlands, Belgium, Switzerland and Sweden have also won the tournament. The tournament has been won by 17 clubs, 6 of which have won it more than once, and three successfully defended their title. Rot-Weiss Köln is the most successful club in the tournament's history, having won it 9 times. Amsterdam are the current European champions, having beaten Harvestehuder THC 7–4 in the 2026 final for their first title.

== Format ==
A total of eight teams competes in the EuroHockey Indoor Club Cup, the champions of those nations ranked one to six in the previous year's Cup and the champions of those 2 nations promoted from the previous year's Trophy, the second level.

The eight teams are divided into two groups and play each other once. If a game is won, the winning team receives 5 points. A draw results in both teams receiving 2 points. A loss gives the losing team 1 point unless the losing team lost by 3 or more goals, then they receive 0 points. The top two teams advance to the semi-finals and the bottom two teams will be placed in pool C, the relegation pool. Each team in Pool C will carry forward the result of the match against that other team in their original pool (A or B) who also goes forward with them into Pool C. Each team will play the other 2 teams in Pool C once. The bottom two teams in pool C are relegated.

== Results ==
Year	Host	Final			Third place match			Number of teams
Year	Host	Winner	Score	Runner-up	Third place	Score	Fourth place	Number of teams
1990; Details	Amiens, France	(West Germany); Rot-Weiss Köln	8–4	(Netherlands); Amsterdam	(Scotland); Edinburgh		(Spain); Club de Campo	16
1991; Details	Limburg an der Lahn, Germany	(Germany); Rot-Weiss Köln	8–6	(Germany); Limburger HC	(Netherlands); Hattem		(Poland); Pomorzanin Torún	8
1992; Details	Amiens, France	(Germany); Limburger HC	4–3	(Germany); Rot-Weiss Köln	(Netherlands); Oranje Zwart		(Poland); Pomorzanin Torún	8
1993; Details	Vienna, Austria	(Germany); Rot-Weiss Köln	4–3	(Germany); Limburger HC	(Austria); WAC		(England); St Albans	8
1994; Details	Cologne, Germany	(Germany); Rot-Weiss Köln	13–3	(Spain); Valdeluz	(Poland); Grunwald Poznań		(Austria); WAC	8
1995; Details	Lille, France	(Germany); Rot-Weiss Köln	5–3	(Germany); Harvestehuder THC	(Poland); Pocztowiec Poznań		(Czech Republic); Bohemians Prague	8
1996; Details	Vienna, Austria	(Germany); Rot-Weiss Köln	10–5	(Czech Republic); Bohemians Prague	(Austria); WAC		(Spain); CD Terrassa	8
1997; Details	Cologne, Germany	(Germany); Harvestehuder THC	6–5	(Germany); Rot-Weiss Köln	(Denmark); Slagelse		(England); Old Loughtonians	8
1998; Details	Hamburg, Germany	(Germany); Harvestehuder THC	6–3	(Germany); Dürkheimer HC	(Poland); Pocztowiec		(France); Lille	8
1999; Details	Lille, France	(Spain); Atlètic Terrassa	9–7	(Germany); Dürkheimer HC	(Germany); Harvestehuder THC		(France); Lille	8
2000; Details	Bad Dürkheim, Germany	(Germany); Dürkheimer HC	6–3	(Denmark); Slagelse	(France); Montrouge		(Russia); Dinamo Stroitel	8
2001; Details	Wettingen, Switzerland	(Germany); Dürkheimer HC	4–2	(Poland); Pocztowiec Poznań	(Spain); Atlètic Terrassa		(France); Lille	8
2002; Details	Terrassa, Spain	(Switzerland); Rotweiss Wettingen	8–4	(Spain); Atlètic Terrassa	(Germany); Rot-Weiß München		(Germany); Dürkheimer HC	8
2003; Details	Hamburg, Germany	(Poland); Pocztowiec Poznań	4–3	(Germany); UHC Hamburg	(France); Lille		(Switzerland); Grasshoppers	8
2004; Details	Espinho, Portugal	(Germany); Münchner SC	7–3	(France); Lille	(Switzerland); Rotweiss Wettingen		(Portugal); Espinho	8
2005; Details	Vienna, Austria	(Germany); Club an der Alster	5–3	(Poland); Pocztowiec Poznań	(France); Lille		(Denmark); Orient Lyngby	8
2006; Details	Bad Dürkheim, Germany	(Germany); Dürkheimer HC	5–0	(Poland); Pocztowiec Poznań	(Austria); Arminen		(France); Lille	8
2007; Details	Lille, France	(Poland); Pocztowiec Poznań	6–3	(Austria); Arminen	(Spain); Club de Campo		(Germany); Münchner SC	8
2008; Details	Perth, Scotland	(Germany); Crefelder HTC	3–2 (a.e.t.)	(Poland); Pocztowiec Poznań	(Spain); Club de Campo		(Scotland); Grove Menzieshill	8
2009; Details	Rüsselsheim am Main, Germany	(Germany); Rüsselsheimer RK	3–2 (g.g.)	(Spain); Club de Campo	(Switzerland); Luzerner SC		(Poland); Pocztowiec Poznań	8
2010; Details	Cologne, Germany	(Germany); Rot-Weiss Köln	10–2	(Spain); Atlètic Terrassa	(Switzerland); Luzerner SC		(Russia); Dinamo Elektrostal	8
2011; Details	Lucerne, Switzerland	(Germany); Mannheimer HC	7–1	(Russia); Dinamo Stroitel	(Netherlands); Amsterdam		(Switzerland); Luzerner SC	8
2012; Details	Hamburg, Germany	(Germany); Club an der Alster	7–3	(Netherlands); HDM	(Russia); Dinamo Elektrostal		(Spain); Club Egara	8
2013; Details	Lille, France	(Germany); Rot-Weiss Köln	7–2	(Belgium); Racing Club de Bruxelles	(Russia); Dinamo Stroitel		(France); Lille	8
2014; Details	East Grinstead, England	(Germany); Harvestehuder THC	10–4	(Russia); Dinamo Stroitel	(Belgium); Racing Club de Bruxelles		(Spain); Complutense	8
2015; Details	Mülheim, Germany	(Germany); Uhlenhorst Mülheim	5–4	(Austria); Arminen	(Spain); Complutense	5–3	(Sweden); Partille	8
2016; Details	Hamburg, Germany	(Germany); Harvestehuder THC	2–1	(Austria); Arminen	(Sweden); Partille	4–1	(England); East Grinstead	8
2017; Details	Vienna, Austria	(Germany); Uhlenhorst Mülheim	3–2	(Austria); Arminen	(Netherlands); Amsterdam	4–2	(England); East Grinstead	8
2018; Details	Wettingen, Switzerland	(Germany); Rot-Weiss Köln	5–2	(Belgium); Racing Club de Bruxelles	(Russia); Dinamo Elektrostal	4–3	(Netherlands); Amsterdam	8
2019; Details	Vienna, Austria	(Sweden); Partille	3–1	(Austria); Arminen	(Germany); UHC Hamburg	8–6	(Russia); Dinamo Stroitel	8
2020; Details	Poznań, Poland	(Germany); Club an der Alster	3–1	(Austria); Arminen	(Belarus); Minsk	4–3	(Poland); Grunwald Poznań	8
2021; Details	Alanya, Turkey	Cancelled due to the COVID-19 pandemic.						8
2022; Details	Alanya, Turkey	(Russia); Dinamo Elektrostal	Round-robin	(Croatia); Zelina	(Austria); Post SV	Round-robin	(Spain); Complutense	7
2023; Details	Alanya, Turkey	Cancelled due to the 2023 Turkey–Syria earthquakes.						8
2024; Details	Vienna, Austria	(Germany); Harvestehuder THC	6–6 (3–2 s.o.)	(Netherlands); HDM	(Croatia); Mladost	4–3	(Spain); Complutense	10
2025; Details	Wettingen, Switzerland	(Belgium); Léopold	2–2 (2–0 s.o.)	(Germany); Mannheimer HC	(Spain); Complutense	3–3 (2–1 s.o.)	(Netherlands); Voordaan	8
2026; Details	Sant Cugat del Vallès, Spain	(Netherlands); Amsterdam	7–4	(Germany); Harvestehuder THC	(Spain); Junior FC	5–4	(Belgium); Léopold	8
2027; Details	Vienna, Austria							8

== Records and statistics ==
=== Performance by club ===
Medal table by club
Rank	Club	Gold	Silver	Bronze	Total
1	(Germany) Rot-Weiss Köln	9	2	0	11
2	(Germany) Harvestehuder THC	5	2	1	8
3	(Germany) Dürkheimer HC	3	2	0	5
4	(Germany) Club an der Alster	3	0	0	3
5	(Poland) Pocztowiec Poznań	2	4	2	8
6	(Germany) Uhlenhorst Mülheim	2	0	0	2
7	(Spain) Atlètic Terrassa	1	2	1	4
8	(Germany) Limburger HC	1	2	0	3
9	(Netherlands) Amsterdam	1	1	2	4
10	(Germany) Mannheimer HC	1	1	0	2
11	(Russia) Dinamo Elektrostal	1	0	2	3
12	(Sweden) Partille	1	0	1	2
12	(Switzerland) Rotweiss Wettingen	1	0	1	2
14	(Germany) Crefelder HTC	1	0	0	1
14	(Belgium) Léopold	1	0	0	1
14	(Germany) Münchner SC	1	0	0	1
14	(Germany) Rüsselsheimer RK	1	0	0	1
18	(Austria) Arminen	0	6	1	7
19	(Russia) Dinamo Stroitel	0	2	1	3
19	(Belgium) Racing Club de Bruxelles	0	2	1	3
21–40	Remaining	0	9	22	31
Totals (40 entries)		35	35	35	105

=== Performances by nation ===
Medal table by nation
Rank	Nation	Gold	Silver	Bronze	Total
1	Germany (Note: Includes results from West German clubs in 1990)	27	10	2	39
2	Poland	2	4	3	9
3	Spain	1	4	7	12
4	Netherlands	1	3	4	8
5	Russia	1	2	3	6
6	Belgium	1	2	1	4
7	Switzerland	1	0	3	4
8	Sweden	1	0	1	2
9	Austria	0	6	4	10
10	France	0	1	3	4
11	Croatia	0	1	1	2
11	Denmark	0	1	1	2
13	Czech Republic	0	1	0	1
14	Belarus	0	0	1	1
14	Scotland	0	0	1	1
Totals (15 entries)		35	35	35	105

== See also ==
- Women's EuroHockey Indoor Club Cup
- Men's Euro Hockey League
- Men's EuroHockey Indoor Championship
- Men's EuroHockey Club Champions Cup
