= Der Club an der Alster =

German field hockey and tennis club in Hamburg

- Full name: Der Club an der Alster e.V.
- Short name: DCadA
- League: Men's Bundesliga; Women's Bundesliga
- Founded: 28 November 1919; 106 years ago
- Website: Club website
Home	Away

Der Club an der Alster is a field hockey and tennis club located in Hamburg, Germany.

The men's team have won seven Bundesliga titles, with the most recent one being won in the 2010–11 season. The women's team won their first Bundesliga title in the 2017–18 season.

== Honours ==
=== Men ===
Bundesliga

- Winners (7): 1998–99, 2000–01, 2002–03, 2003–04, 2006–07, 2007–08, 2010–11
- Runners-up (3): 1999–2000, 2001–02, 2004–05

EuroHockey Club Champions Cup

- Winners (2): 2000, 2002
- Runners-up (1): 2008

EuroHockey Cup Winners Cup

- Runners-up (1): 2003

Indoor Bundesliga

- Winners (3): 2003–04, 2010–11, 2018–19
- Runners-up (4): 1987–88, 1995–96, 2017–18, 2022–23

EuroHockey Indoor Club Cup

- Winners (3): 2005, 2012, 2020

=== Women ===
Bundesliga

- Winners (2): 2017–18, 2018–19
- Runners-up (3): 2001–02, 2005–06, 2008–09

Indoor Bundesliga

- Winners (5): 2005–06, 2007–08, 2008–09, 2017–18, 2019–20
- Runners-up (6): 2004–05, 2011–12, 2012–13, 2014–15, 2018–19, 2022–23

EuroHockey Indoor Club Cup

- Winners (3): 2007, 2009, 2010

== Current squad ==
=== Men's squad ===
As of 2022–23

No.	Pos.	Nation	Player
1	GK	SCO	Tommy Alexander
4	DF	GER	Max Schnepel
5	DF	GER	Friedrich Gröpper
6	MF	GER	Lenny Wolbers
8	DF	GER	Anton Boeckel
9	FW	GER	Philip Röthlander
12	DF	GER	Nik Kerner
13	FW	SCO	Struan Walker
14	DF	GER	Simon Mundorf
16	MF	GER	Dieter Linnekogel
18	MF	GER	Anton Wildung

No.	Pos.	Nation	Player
19	FW	GER	Christian Reimann
24	FW	GER	Levi von Wedel
30	DF	FRA	Fred Gohlke
32	FW	GER	Niklas Bruns
33	FW	USA	Jack Heldens
24	GK	GER	Moritz Zimmermann
—	MF	GER	Till Brockmann
—	MF	WAL	Daniel Kyriakides
—	FW	ARG	Federico Fernandez
—	FW	GER	Jonas Althusmann
—	DF	GER	Paul Philip

=== Women's squad ===
As of 2022–23

No.	Pos.	Nation	Player
1	GK	GER	Safia Buttler
2	DF	GER	Kira Horn
4	FW	GER	Hannah Gablać
5	MF	GER	Felicia Wiedermann
7	FW	GER	Juliane Grashoff
8	DF	GER	Katharina Kirschbaum
9	DF	GER	Emma Davidsmeyer
10	DF	ENG	Victoria McCabe
11	MF	GER	Lisa Altenburg
12	MF	SCO	Laura Swanson
14	MF	GER	Nele Aring
15	GK	GER	Mali Wichmann

No.	Pos.	Nation	Player
16	FW	GER	Sophie Perschk
17	MF	GER	Elisa Paul-Jahnke
18	FW	GER	Hanna Granitzki
19	MF	GER	Anne Schröder
21	MF	GER	Marie Jeltsch
23	DF	GER	Emily Matthes
24	FW	GER	Emily Wolbers
25	DF	GER	Viktoria Huse
29	FW	GER	Carlotta Sippel
31	DF	GER	Anna Batschko
35	GK	GER	Clara Batschko
