= Grunwald Poznań (field hockey) =

WKS Grunwald Poznań
- Full name: Wojskowy Klub Sportowy Grunwald Poznań
- Short name: WKS Grunwald
- League: Ekstraklasa
- Founded: 1952
- Home ground: Henryk Zielazek Stadium, Poznań (Capacity 3000)

Personnel
- Chairman: Wojciech Satkowski
- Manager: Jerzy Wybieralski (1st); Eugeniusz Gaczkowski (2nd)
- Website: Club website
Home	Away

WKS Grunwald Poznań is a Polish field hockey club, a section of the wider multi-sports club, from Poznań. It is historically one of the most successful clubs in the country and regularly competes in European competitions.

== History ==
The section traces its roots to inter-war military club WKS Poznań, champions of Poland in 1935, 1936 and 1938. However the courts have decided that these titles are not formally recognised as belonging to WKS Grunwald.

The section was created in January 1952. At the turn of 1951/1952, the Board of the Union Sports Club Włókniarz Poznań (third place in the Polish Championships in 1950) made a proposal to the Board of the Garrison Military Sports Club (GWKS) Poznań to take over the field and ice hockey sections, which it itself was unable to maintain. The management of GWKS agreed and the section was officially taken over.

The team is one of the most successful teams of all time. Since the early 90s they were regulars in European competitions. Domestically they dominated the 2010s adding several titles to their already large tally. They also dominated the indoor championships in equal measure.

The following decade also started with domination winning in 2020 and 2021.

== Honours ==
- Polish Championship
  - Gold medal (27 times): 1955, 1966, 1992, 1993, 1994, 1996, 1997, 1999, 2000, 2001, 2002, 2003, 2008, 2009, 2010, 2011, 2012, 2013, 2015, 2016, 2017, 2018, 2019, 2020, 2021, 2024, 2025
  - Silver medal (19 times): 1956, 1958, 1959, 1963, 1971, 1972, 1973, 1975, 1987, 1990, 1991, 1995, 1998, 2004, 2005, 2006, 2007, 2014, 2023
  - Bronze medal (10 times): 1957, 1961, 1962, 1965, 1967, 1970, 1974, 1985, 1986, 1989
- Polish Indoor Championship
  - Gold medal (18 times): 1961, 1963, 1965, 1966, 1974, 1992, 1993, 2001, 2003, 2010, 2011, 2012, 2013, 2014, 2015, 2016, 2018, 2019
  - Silver medal (13 times): 1967, 1970, 1972, 1975, 1988, 1990, 1991, 2005, 2007, 2009, 2017, 2020, 2021
  - Bronze medal (5 times): 1987, 1989, 1994, 1996, 1999
- Polish Junior Championship
  - Gold medal (3 times): 1971, 1973, 1993
  - Silver medal (4 times): 1972, 1992, 1994, 2004
  - Bronze medal (2 times): 1989, 2006
- Polish Junior Indoor Championship
  - Gold medal (2 times): 1992, 1993
  - Silver medal (3 times): 1971, 1972, 1994
  - Bronze medal (2 times): 2006, 2013

== Stadium ==
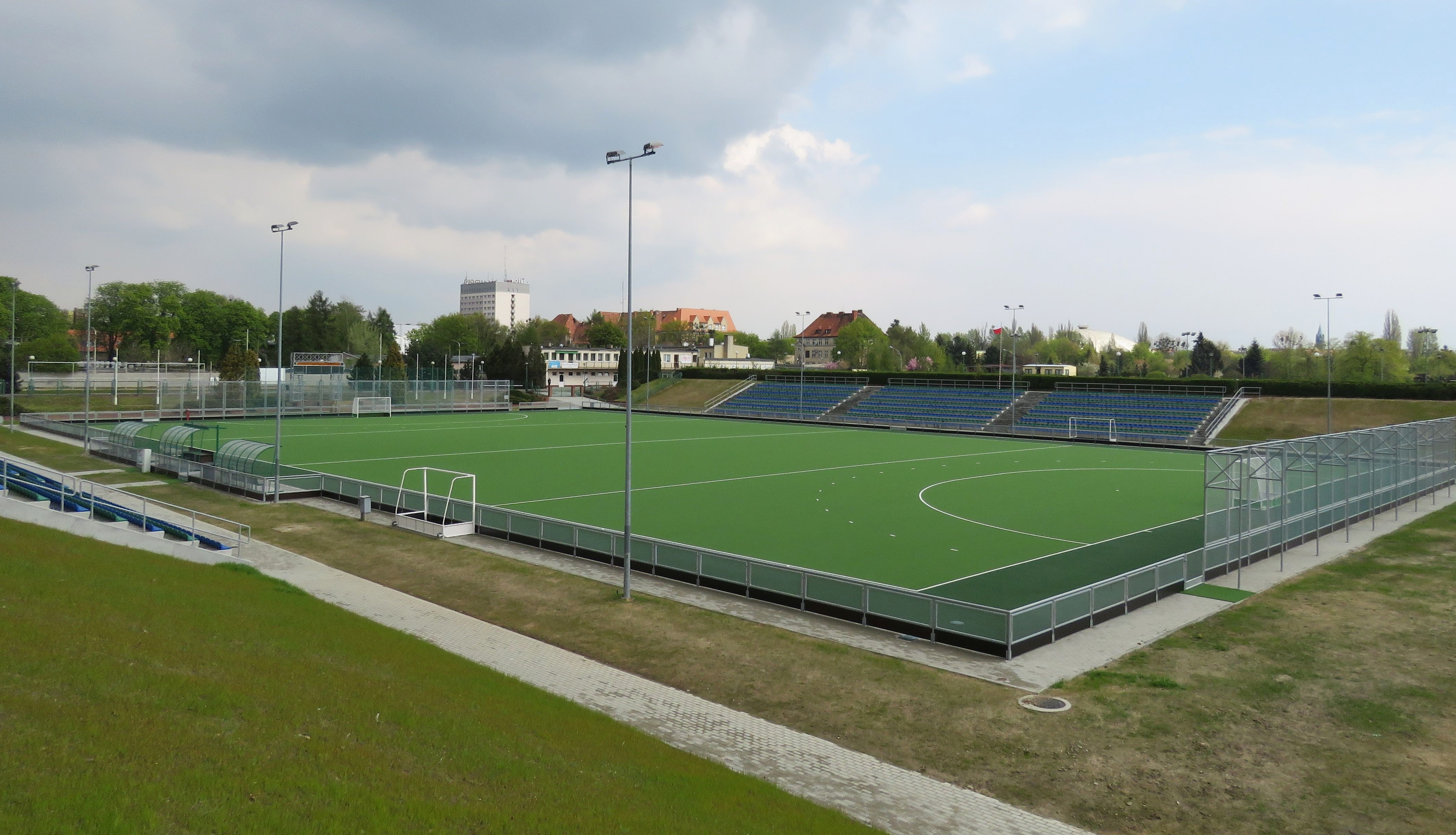
Henryk Zielazka Stadium, home of the club

The club plays its home games at the field hockey only Henryk Zielazka Stadium (Polish: Stadion im. Henryka Zielazka) in the Grunwald neighbourhood of Poznań next to the Polish Army base in the city. The stadium was renovated in 2016 and has stands which can hold up to 3000 people. It was named in 2017 after a local prominent field hockey activist.

== Bibliography ==
- Kronika Miasta Poznania - SPORT 1 (in Polish). Poznań: Wydawnictwo Miejskie. 2010.
- E. Baumann (1987). Zarys 40 lat WKS Grunwald w Poznaniu (1947-1987) (in Polish). Poznań.
- Bernard Woltmann. 75 lat Poznańskiego ZPN (in Polish).
