= 2016–17 Euro Hockey League =

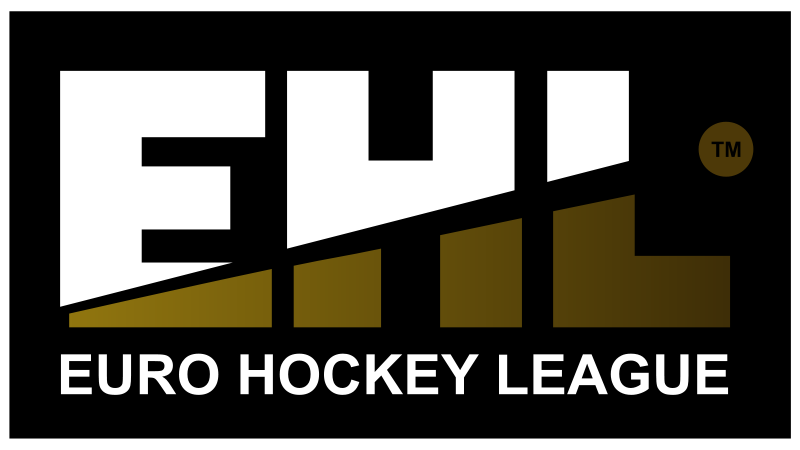

Tournament details
- Dates: 7 October 2016 – 4 June 2017
- Teams: 24
- Venue: 3 (in 3 host cities)

Final positions
- Champions: (Germany) Rot-Weiss Köln (1st title)
- Runner-up: (Netherlands) Oranje-Rood
- Third place: (Belgium) Dragons

Tournament statistics
- Matches played: 28
- Goals scored: 145 (5.18 per match)
- Top scorer: (Netherlands) Mink van der Weerden (5 goals)

The 2016–17 Euro Hockey League was the tenth season of the Euro Hockey League, Europe's premier club field hockey tournament organized by the EHF. Round One was held in Banbridge, Northern Ireland. the round of 16 and quarterfinals in Eindhoven, Netherlands and the semi-finals, third place game and the final were held in Brasschaat, Belgium.

== Qualified teams ==
Round one
Champions	Non-champions	
(Russia) Dinamo Kazan	(Netherlands) Kampong	(England) Holcombe
(Scotland) Kelburne	(Germany) UHC Hamburg	(France) Saint Germain
(Italy) Amsicora	(Belgium) Léopold	(Poland) AZS AWF Poznań
(Wales) Cardiff & Met	(Spain) Atlètic Terrassa	(Ireland) Banbridge
KO16
Champions		Non-champions
(Netherlands) Oranje-Rood	(England) Wimbledon	(Netherlands) Amsterdam
(Germany) Rot-Weiss Köln	Racing France	(Germany) Mannheimer HC
(Belgium) Dragons	(Poland) Grunwald Poznań	(Belgium) Racing Bruxelles
(Spain) Club Egara	(Ireland) Lisnagarvey	(Spain) Real Club de Polo

== Round one ==
Round One was played in Banbridge, Northern Ireland between 7 and 19 October 2016. In each group, teams played against each other once in a round-robin format. The pool winners advanced to the round of 16. If a game was won, the winning team received 5 points. A draw resulted in both teams receiving 2 points. A loss gave the losing team 1 point unless the losing team lost by 3 or more goals, then they received 0 points.

=== Pool A ===
Pos	Team	Pld	W	D	L	GF	GA	GD	Pts	Qualification
1	(Netherlands) Kampong	2	2	0	0	9	2	+7	10	Advance to knockout stage
2	(England) Holcombe	2	1	0	1	9	3	+6	6	
3	(Poland) AZS AWF Poznań	2	0	0	2	2	15	−13	0	

Source: EHF

7 October 2016
18:30

AZS AWF Poznań (Poland)	1–8	(England) Holcombe
Pawlak 50'	Report	Trusler 8', 42', 50'; Bandurak 28'; Ward 38', 43', 57'; Field 52'

Umpires:
David Sweetman (SCO)
Pietro Galligani (ITA)

8 October 2016
17:00

Kampong (Netherlands)	2–1	(England) Holcombe
De Wijn 37', 55'	Report	Ward 21'

Umpires:
Warren McCully (IRL)
Andres Ortiz (ESP)

9 October 2016
13:30

Kampong (Netherlands)	7–1	(Poland) AZS AWF Poznań
Jonker 1', 21'; Havenga 9', 11', 35'; Kemperman 19'; J. Luijkx 53'	Report	Bator 37'

Umpires:
Mikhail Golovanov (RUS)
Sebastien Michielsen (BEL)

=== Pool B ===
Pos	Team	Pld	W	D	L	GF	GA	GD	Pts	Qualification
1	(Germany) UHC Hamburg	2	2	0	0	15	2	+13	10	Advance to knockout stage
2	(Wales) Cardiff & Met	2	1	0	1	6	3	+3	6	
3	(Italy) Amsicora	2	0	0	2	1	17	−16	0	

Source: EHF

7 October 2016
14:00

Cardiff & Met (Wales)	5–0	(Italy) Amsicora
Wall; Hawker 34'; Carless 42'; Brignull 48'; Hardy 53'	Report

Umpires:
Marcin Grochal (POL
Mikhail Golovanov (RUS)

8 October 2016
12:30

UHC Hamburg (Germany)	12–1	(Italy) Amsicora
Harms 13'; Katterbach 15', 58'; Alt 17'; Kohl 19', 51'; Korn 21'; P. Schmid 34', 37'; Rabente 53'; Teschke 54', 59'	Report	G. Carta 56'

Umpires:
Paul van den Assum (NED)
Sebastien Michielsen

9 October 2016
11:15

UHC Hamburg (Germany)	3–1	(Wales) Cardiff & Met
Harms 10'; Korn 26'; Rabente 36'	Report	Carless 55'

Umpires:
Andres Ortiz (ESP)
Paul van den Assum (NED)

=== Pool C ===
Pos	Team	Pld	W	D	L	GF	GA	GD	Pts	Qualification
1	(Ireland) Banbridge (H)	2	1	1	0	5	3	+2	7	Advance to knockout stage
2	(Belgium) Léopold	2	1	1	0	7	6	+1	7	
3	(France) Saint Germain	2	0	0	2	3	6	−3	2	

Source: EHF
(H) Hosts

7 October 2016
16:15

Léopold (Belgium)	4–3	(France) Saint Germain
Turner 9'; A. Verdussen 15', 42'; M. Plennevaux 29'	Report	H. Genestet 40', 51'; M. Genestet 57'

Umpires:
Andres Ortiz (ESP)
Paul van den Assum (NED)

8 October 2016
14:45

Saint Germain (France)	0–2	(Ireland) Banbridge
	Report	McKee 8'; Ward 30'

Umpires:
Marcin Grochal (POL)
Pietro Galligani (ITA)

9 October 2016
15:45

Léopold (Belgium)	3–3	(Ireland) Banbridge
M. Plennevaux 10'; Lemaire 12'; Thiéry 34'	Report	E. Magee 2'; K. Marshall 33', 39'

Umpires:
David Sweetman (SCO)
Dan Barstow (ENG)

=== Pool D ===
Pos	Team	Pld	W	D	L	GF	GA	GD	Pts	Qualification
1	(Spain) Atlètic Terrassa	2	1	1	0	7	6	+1	7	Advance to knockout stage
2	(Scotland) Kelburne	2	1	0	1	5	4	+1	6	
3	(Russia) Dinamo Kazan	2	0	1	1	5	7	−2	3	

Source: EHF

7 October 2016
11:45

Kelburne (Scotland)	3–1	(Russia) Dinamo Kazan
McKenzie 24'; Nommensen 38'; Cairns 53'	Report	Nikolaev 57'

Umpires:
Johannes Berneth (GER)
Sebastien Michielsen (BEL)

8 October 2016
10:15

Atlètic Terrassa (Spain)	4–4	(Russia) Dinamo Kazan
Torrente 7'; Salles 20'; O. Malgosa 54'; Cortes 60'	Report	Komarov 14'; Kornilov 18', 45'; Iankun 25'

Umpires:
Dan Barstow (ENG)
Johannes Berneth (GER)

9 October 2016
09:00

Atlètic Terrassa (Spain)	3–2	(Scotland) Kelburne
Carrera 10'; J. Malgosa 32'; Bach 33'	Report	Nommensen 10'; Cairns 43'

Umpires:
Warren McCully (IRL)
Marcin Gorchal (POL)

== Knockout stage ==
The round of 16 and the quarter-finals were played in Eindhoven, Netherlands between 14 and 17 April 2017. Semi-finals, third place match and the final were played in Brasschaat, Belgium on 3 and 4 June 2017.

=== Bracket ===
Round of 16
15 April
(Netherlands) Oranje-Rood	3
(Netherlands) Amsterdam	2
15 April
(Spain) Atlètic Terrassa	4
(Ireland) Lisnagarvey	1
15 April
(England) Wimbledon	3
(Germany) UHC Hamburg	1
15 April
(Germany) Mannheimer HC	2
(Spain) Club Egara	1
14 April
(Belgium) Dragons	2
(Belgium) Racing Bruxelles	1
14 April
(Ireland) Banbridge	1 (0)
Racing France (s.o.)	1 (3)
14 April
(Poland) Grunwald Poznań	0
(Spain) Real Club de Polo	6
14 April
(Netherlands) Kampong	1
(Germany) Rot-Weiss Köln	2

Quarter-finals
17 April
(Netherlands) Oranje-Rood	2
(Spain) Atlètic Terrassa	0
17 April
(England) Wimbledon (s.o.)	2 (5)
(Germany) Mannheimer HC	2 (3)
16 April
(Belgium) Dragons	5
Racing France	1
16 April
(Spain) Real Club de Polo	1
(Germany) Rot-Weiss Köln	2

Semi-finals
3 June
(Netherlands) Oranje-Rood	8
(England) Wimbledon	0
3 June
(Belgium) Dragons	3
(Germany) Rot-Weiss Köln	5

Final
4 June
(Netherlands) Oranje-Rood	2
(Germany) Rot-Weiss Köln	3
Bronze medal match
4 June
(England) Wimbledon	1
(Belgium) Dragons	3

=== Round of 16 ===
14 April 2017
12:45

Banbridge (Ireland)	1–1	Racing France
Allister 49'	Report	Peters-Deutz 25'
Penalties
E. Magee (penalty shoot-out missed); McKee (penalty shoot-out missed); Brown (penalty shoot-out missed)	0–3	(penalty shoot-out scored) Dominik; (penalty shoot-out scored) Bellenger; (penalty shoot-out scored) Peters-Deutz

Umpires:
Francisco Vazquez Lopez (ESP)
Sebastien Michielsen (BEL)

14 April 2017
15:00

Grunwald Poznań (Poland)	0–6	(Spain) Real Club de Polo
	Report	Alegre 2', 51'; Casasayas 32', 33', 43'; Reyne 58'

Umpires:
Ben Goentgen (GER)
Warren McCully (IRL)

14 April 2017
17:15

Dragons (Belgium)	2–1	(Belgium) Racing Bruxelles
Verheijen 13'; Briels 53'	Report	Truyens 55'

Umpires:
Jonas van 't Hek (NED)
Dave Dowdall (ENG)

14 April 2017
19:30

Kampong (Netherlands)	1–2	(Germany) Rot-Weiss Köln
Caspers 52'	Report	M. Grambusch 34'; Gomoll 40'

Umpires:
Martin Madden (SCO)
Bruce Bale (ENG)

15 April 2017
10:30

Atlètic Terrassa (Spain)	4–1	(Ireland) Lisnagarvey
Oliva 5', 13', 58'; Boltó 45'	Report	Murray 9'

Umpires:
Martin Madden (SCO)
Dave Dowdall (ENG)

15 April 2017
12:45

Wimbledon (England)	3–1	(Germany) UHC Hamburg
Roper 14', 60'; Arnold 35'	Report	J. Schmid 49'

Umpires:
Coen van Bunge (NED)
Sebastien Michielsen (BEL)

15 April 2017
15:00

Oranje-Rood (Netherlands)	3–2	(Netherlands) Amsterdam
Mazzilli 29', 29'; Van der Weerden 35'	Report	Burkhardt 8'; Reid-Ross 44'

Umpires:
Francisco Vazquez Lopez (ESP)
Ben Goentgen (GER)

15 April 2017
17:15

Mannheimer HC (Germany)	2–1	(Spain) Club Egara
Barreiros 14'; Schües 56'	Report	Quemada 52'

Umpires:
Jonas van 't Hek (NED)
Bruce Bale (ENG)

=== Quarter-finals ===
16 April 2017
12:15

Dragons (Belgium)	5–1	Racing France
Briels 21', 26'; Hendrickx 23', 28'; Van Aubel 38'	Report	Peters-Deutz 40'

Umpires:
Warren McCully (IRL)
Coen van Bunge (NED)

16 April 2017
14:30

Real Club de Polo (Spain)	1–2	(Germany) Rot-Weiss Köln
Coll Mencos 37'	Report	Zeller 11'; Miltkau

Umpires:
Jonas van 't Hek (NED)
Martin Madden (SCO)

17 April 2017
13:15

Wimbledon (England)	2–2	(Germany) Mannheimer HC
Mantell 28'; Sloan 29'	Report	Peillat 13'; Ehling 55'
Penalties
Sloan (penalty shoot-out scored); Ebbers (penalty shoot-out scored); Roper (penalty shoot-out scored); Mantell (penalty shoot-out scored); Ball (penalty shoot-out scored)	5–3	(penalty shoot-out scored) Fischer; (penalty shoot-out scored) Harris; (penalty shoot-out missed) Neumann; (penalty shoot-out scored) Barreiros

Umpires:
Francisco Vazquez Lopez (ESP)
Jonas van 't Hek (NED)

17 April 2017
15:30

Oranje-Rood (Netherlands)	2–0	(Spain) Atlètic Terrassa
Van der Weerden 13'; De Voogd 35'	Report

Umpires:
Ben Goentgen (GER)
Martin Madden (SCO)

=== Semi-finals ===
3 June 2017
13:00

Dragons (Belgium)	3–5	(Germany) Rot-Weiss Köln
Hendrickx 58'; Van Aubel 58'; Luyten 59'	Report	Adrians 24'; Gomoll 27'; Müller 28'; Miltkau 46'; T. Grambusch 57'

Umpires:
Martin Madden (SCO)
Jonas van 't Hek (NED)

3 June 2017
15:30

Oranje-Rood (Netherlands)	8–0	(England) Wimbledon
Stanzl 2'; Van Baal 11'; Van der Weerden 13', 20'; Galema 13'; De Mol 30'; Beins 53'; Van der Schoot 59'	Report

Umpires:
Christian Blasch (GER)
Francisco Vazquez Lopez (ESP)

=== Bronze medal match ===
4 June 2017
13:00

Wimbledon (England)	1–3	(Belgium) Dragons
Roper 60'	Report	Hendrickx 12'; Briels 20'; Rubens 57'

Umpires:
Christian Blasch (GER)
Jakub Mejzlik (CZE)

=== Final ===
4 June 2017
15:30

Oranje-Rood (Netherlands)	2–3	(Germany) Rot-Weiss Köln
Mazzilli 38'; Van der Weerden 40'	Report	T. Grambusch 28'; Adrians 35'; Scholten 50'

Umpires:
Martin Madden (SCO)
Francisco Vazquez Lopez (ESP)

== See also ==
- 2017 EuroHockey Club Champions Cup
- 2017 Men's EuroHockey Indoor Club Cup
