= 2023 Men's EuroHockey Indoor Club Cup =

Cancelled indoor hockey competition

Tournament details
- Host country: Turkey
- City: Alanya
- Dates: Cancelled
- Teams: 8 (from 8 associations)
- Venue: Alanya Atatürk Spor Salonu

The 2023 Men's EuroHockey Indoor Club Cup was scheduled to be the 33rd edition of the Men's EuroHockey Indoor Club Cup, Europe's premier men's club indoor hockey tournament organized by the European Hockey Federation. It was scheduled to be held at the Alanya Atatürk Spor Salonu in Alanya, Turkey from 17 to 19 February 2023. On 10 February 2023, it was announced the tournament was cancelled due to the impact of the 2023 Turkey–Syria earthquake.

== Qualified teams ==
Participating clubs qualified based on their country's final rankings from the 2022 competition. Teams from Belarus and Russia were excluded from the tournament due to their involvement in the 2022 Russian invasion of Ukraine.

1. (Croatia) Mladost
2. (Austria) Post SV
3. (Spain) Complutense
4. (Turkey) Gaziantep
5. (Poland) Grunwald Poznań
6. (Belgium) Léopold
7. (France) LUC Ronchin
8. (England) Wimbledon

== See also ==
- 2022–23 Men's Euro Hockey League
- 2023 Women's EuroHockey Indoor Club Cup
