= 2024 Men's EuroHockey Indoor Club Cup =

International indoor hockey competition

Tournament details
- Host country: Austria
- City: Vienna
- Dates: 15–18 February
- Teams: 10 (from 10 associations)
- Venue: SV Arminen

Final positions
- Champions: (Germany) Harvestehuder THC (5th title)
- Runner-up: (Netherlands) HDM
- Third place: (Croatia) Mladost

Tournament statistics
- Matches played: 29
- Goals scored: 316 (10.9 per match)
- Top scorer: Michael Körper (Harvestehude) (25 goals)
- Best player: Mustapha Cassiem (HDM)
- Best goalkeeper: Joey van Walstijn (HDM)

The 2024 Men's EuroHockey Indoor Club Cup was the 33rd edition of the Men's EuroHockey Indoor Club Cup, Europe's premier indoor hockey club tournament for men organized by the European Hockey Federation. It was hosted by SV Arminen in Vienna, Austria from 15 to 18 February 2024.

Harvestehuder THC won their fifth title by defeating HDM 3–2 in the shoot-out after the final finished 6–6 in regular time. Mladost won their first ever medal by defeating Complutense 4–3 in the bronze medal match. Wimbledon, LUC Ronchin, the hosts Arminen and Grunwald Poznań finished in the bottom four, which means England, France, Austria and Poland were relegated to the Club Trophy in 2025.

== Teams ==
Because the 2023 edition was cancelled no national association was relegated, so ten teams participated in this edition. The Netherlands and Germany were promoted from the 2023 EuroHockey Indoor Club Trophy.

- (Austria) Arminen
- (Spain) Complutense
- (Turkey) Gaziantep
- (Poland) Grunwald Poznań
- (Germany) Harvestehuder THC
- (Netherlands) HDM
- (Belgium) Léopold
- (France) LUC Ronchin
- (Croatia) Mladost
- (England) Wimbledon

== Preliminary round ==
=== Pool A ===
Pos	Team	Pld	W	D	L	GF	GA	GD	Pts	Qualification or relegation
1	(Germany) Harvestehuder THC	4	4	0	0	44	11	+33	20	Qualification for the semi-finals
2	(Croatia) Mladost	4	3	0	1	23	20	+3	15	Qualification for the semi-finals
3	(Turkey) Gaziantep	4	1	1	2	14	22	−8	8	
4	(England) Wimbledon	4	1	1	2	13	18	−5	7	
5	(Poland) Grunwald Poznań (R)	4	0	0	4	7	30	−23	2	Relegation to the Indoor Club Trophy

Source: EHF
Rules for classification: 1) points; 2) matches won; 3) goal difference; 4) goals for; 5) head-to-head result; 6) field goals for.
(R) Relegated

15 February 2024
10:00

Grunwald Poznań (Poland)	1–3	(England) Wimbledon
Jarzembowski 7'	Report	Francis 10'; Hooper 18'; Bradshaw 26'

Umpires:
Ivona Makar (CRO)
Ben Goentgen (GER)

15 February 2024
11:15

Gaziantep (Turkey)	2–10	(Germany) Harvestehuder THC
A.A. Özkiliç 18'; Bahrami 23'	Report	Körper 7', 16', 35', 38'; Unterkircher 8', 37'; Von Gersum 14'; Reuter 24'; A. Pöhling 27'; Losonci 34'

Umpires:
Andres Ortiz ESP)
Laurent Dooms (BEL)

15 February 2024
16:00

Gaziantep (Turkey)	4–4	(England) Wimbledon
Elagöz 13'; Bahrami 21', 23'; A.A. Özkiliç 36'	Report	Francis 6'; Patterson 20'; Scott 32'; Waller 35'

Umpires:
Duncan Ruzzak (SCO)
Ivona Makar (CRO)

15 February 2024
17:15

Mladost (Croatia)	4–10	(Germany) Harvestehuder THC
Kalinchuk 16', 28'; G. Fujs 21', 37'	Report	Unterkircher 6', 32', 33'; Reuter 10+'; Körper 12', 32', 39', 39'; K. Pöhling 19'; Von Gersum 35'

Umpires:
Celine Martin-Schmets (BEL)
Lukasz Zwierzchowski (POL)

16 February 2024
10:00

Wimbledon (England)	3–7	(Germany) Harvestehuder THC
Horler 3'; Hooper 8', 40'	Report	Körper 1', 12', 23'; Losonci 5'; Reuter 25'; A. Pöhling 26'; Unterkircher 29'

Umpires:
Andres Ortiz (ESP)
Celine Martin-Schmets (BEL)

16 February 2024
11:15

Grunwald Poznań (Poland)	2–7	(Croatia) Mladost
Jarzembowski 25'; Kosmaczewski 38'	Report	G. Fujs 5'; Klink 7'; Jazbec 13'; Zlatar 16'; Kalinchuk 25', 30', 36'

Umpires:
Duncan Ruzzak (SCO)
Michael Gholami-Eilmer (AUT)

16 February 2024
16:00

Gaziantep (Turkey)	5–6	(Croatia) Mladost
Aydin 24'; A.A. Özkiliç 25'; Ekinci 27'; Bahrami 36'; Valdes 40'	Report	Jazbec 13'; Klink 16', 38'; Kalinchuk 19'; G. Fujs 30+'; A. Fujs 31'

Umpires:
Jake Charles (ENG)
Lukasz Zwierzchowski (POL)

16 February 2024
17:15

Harvestehuder THC (Germany)	17–2	(Poland) Grunwald Poznań
Unterkircher 1', 7', 7', 12', 18', 29', 33'; Von Gersum 6'; Körper 9', 13', 28', 40', 40'; Losonci 15', 19', 20'; A. Pöhling 32'	Report	Jarzembowski 2'; Kosmaczewski 17'

Umpires:
Benjamin Messerli (SUI)
Laurent Dooms (BEL)

17 February 2024
09:00

Grunwald Poznań (Poland)	2–3	(Turkey) Gaziantep
Głowacki 14'; Jarzembowski 40'	Report	A.A. Özkiliç 2'; Elagöz 18'; Aydin 35'

Umpires:
Jake Charles (ENG)
Ivona Makar (CRO)

17 February 2024
10:15

Mladost (Croatia)	6–3	(England) Wimbledon
Schmidt 16', 17', 37'; Jazbec 26'; A. Fujs 29'; Gomoll 38'	Report	Francis 7'; Horler 12', 35'

Umpires:
Michael Gholami-Eilmer (AUT)
Andres Ortiz (ESP)

=== Pool B ===
Pos	Team	Pld	W	D	L	GF	GA	GD	Pts	Qualification or relegation
1	(Netherlands) HDM	4	3	1	0	29	8	+21	17	Qualification for the semi-finals
2	(Spain) Complutense	4	3	1	0	33	16	+17	17	Qualification for the semi-finals
3	(Belgium) Léopold	4	2	0	2	23	31	−8	10	
4	(France) LUC Ronchin	4	0	1	3	12	26	−14	3	
5	(Austria) Arminen (H, R)	4	0	1	3	8	24	−16	2	Relegation to the Indoor Club Trophy

Source: EHF
Rules for classification: 1) points; 2) matches won; 3) goal difference; 4) goals for; 5) head-to-head result; 6) field goals for.
(H) Hosts; (R) Relegated

15 February 2024
12:30

Complutense (Spain)	4–4	(Netherlands) HDM
Sanz 16'; Cobos 18'; Rodríguez 32'; Curiel 40'	Report	Cassiem 6'; Fontaine 7'; Taberima 14'; Versteeg 29'

Umpires:
Benjamin Messerlie (SUI)
Celine Martin-Schmets (BEL)

15 February 2024
13:45

Léopold (Belgium)	7–6	(France) LUC Ronchin
Plennevaux 4', 17', 25'; Degroote 18', 36'; Zimmer 35', 40'	Report	Golliot 2', 11', 29', 39'; Fourcroy 3'; Stekelorom 5'

Umpires:
Duncan Ruzzak (SCO)
Lukasz Zwierzchowski (POL)

15 February 2024
18:30

Complutense (Spain)	9–3	(France) LUC Ronchin
Gallego 1'; Muñoz 2', 23'; Curiel 7'; Rodríguez 22', 32', 33', 38', 40+'	Report	F. Caucheteux 6', 16'; De Bettignies 37'

Umpires:
Michael Gholami-Eilmer (AUT)
Laurent Dooms (BEL)

15 February 2024
19:45

Arminen (Austria)	1–7	(Netherlands) HDM
Steyrer 18'	Report	Cassiem 15', 27'; Taberima 18', 29', 39'; Schut 32', 36'

Umpires:
Jake Charles (ENG)
Andres Ortiz (ESP)

16 February 2024
12:30

LUC Ronchin (France)	0–7	(Netherlands) HDM
	Report	Groenheijde 15'; Cassiem 20', 29'; Schut 22', 27', 40'; Bigalke 39'

Umpires:
Laurent Dooms (BEL)
Jake Charles (ENG)

16 February 2024
13:45

Léopold (Belgium)	6–2	(Austria) Arminen
Zimmer 2', 38'; Plennevaux 11', 17', 27', 33'	Report	Kelner 37', 39'

Umpires:
Ben Goentgen (GER)
Benjamin Messerli (SUI)

16 February 2024
18:30

HDM (Netherlands)	11–3	(Belgium) Léopold
Cassiem 3', 15', 22', 29', 38'; Taberima 5', 19', 31'; Schut 16'; Versteeg 20'; Fontaine 31'	Report	Plennevaux 1'; N. Leeuw 26'; Degroote 36'

Umpires:
Ivona Makar (CRO)
Michael Gholami-Eilmer (AUT)

16 February 2024
19:45

Complutense (Spain)	8–2	(Austria) Arminen
Cobos 1'; Sanz 7', 33'; Curiel 10', 19', 26', 36'; Rodríguez 35'	Report	Steyrer 15'; Kelner 40'

Umpires:
Celine Martin-Schmets (BEL)
Ben Goentgen (GER)

17 February 2024
11:30

Léopold (Belgium)	7–12	(Spain) Complutense
Plennevaux 12', 20', 23'; Degroote 15', 20'; N. Leeuw 36'; Moreno 37'	Report	Rodríguez 5', 14', 28', 39', 40'; Sainz 10'; Cobos 27', 33', 39'; Curiel 34'; Roman 36'; Sanz 40'

Umpires:
Ben Goentgen (GER)
Duncan Ruzzak (SCO)

17 February 2024
12:45

Arminen (Austria)	3–3	(France) LUC Ronchin
Kelner 26'; Fröhlich 38'; Campe 40'	Report	De Bettignies 16', 25'; F. Caucheteux 33'

Umpires:
Benjamin Messerli (SUI)
Lukasz Zwierzchowski (POL)

== Ninth to tenth place classification ==
=== Ninth and tenth place ===
17 February 2024
21:25

Grunwald Poznań (Poland)	3–10	(Austria) Arminen
Dutkiewicz 27'; Kosmaczewski 31'; Jarzembowski 40'	Report	Eitenberger 9'; Campe 14', 15', 39'; Minar 16'; Kelner 17'; Steyrer 25'; Hackl 30', 31'; Fischer 32'

Umpires:
Laurent Dooms (BEL)
Duncan Ruzzak (SCO)

== Fifth to eighth place classification ==
=== Bracket ===
Semi-finals
17 February
(Belgium) Léopold	9
(England) Wimbledon	4
17 February
(Turkey) Gaziantep	7
(France) LUC Ronchin	3

Fifth place
18 February
(Belgium) Léopold	6
(Turkey) Gaziantep	13
Seventh place
18 February
(England) Wimbledon	7
(France) LUC Ronchin	4

=== Semi-finals ===
17 February 2024
15:45

Léopold (Belgium)	9–4	(England) Wimbledon
Plennevaux 5', 8'; Zimmer 16', 19', 30', 31', 34', 37'; Degroote 27'	Report	Kimber 16'; Waller 27', 31'; Scott 39'

Umpires:
Michael Gholami-Eilmer (AUT)
Benjamin Messerli (SUI)

17 February 2024
17:10

Gaziantep (Turkey)	7–3	(France) LUC Ronchin
F.M. Özkiliç 20'; Ekinci 29', 32'; Aydin 29', 35'; Elagöz 34', 39'	Report	Golliot 14'; Piole 20'; Fourcroy 23'

Umpires:
Jake Charles (ENG)
Ivona Makar (CRO)

=== Seventh and eighth place ===
18 February 2024
09:30

Wimbledon (England)	7–4	(France) LUC Ronchin
Francis 2', 21'; Scott 24'; Hooper 26', 33'; Horler 29', 34'	Report	Denis 6'; Golliot 19', 38'; F. Caucheteux 22'

Umpires:
Benjamin Messerli (SUI)
Ivona Makar (CRO)

=== Fifth and sixth place ===
18 February 2024
11:00

Léopold (Belgium)	6–13	(Turkey) Gaziantep
Zimmer 9'; Moraux 21', 39'; Plennevaux 28', 32'; F. Leeuw 40'	Report	F.M. Özkiliç 1'; A.A. Özkiliç 7', 22', 32', 36'; Aydin 11', 17', 39'; Elagöz 15', 30'; Ekinci 24'; Bahrami 34'; Navarro 38'

Umpires:
Lukasz Zwierzchowski (POL)
Jake Charles (ENG)

== First to fourth place classification ==
=== Bracket ===
Semi-finals
17 February
(Germany) Harvestehuder THC	8
(Spain) Complutense	3
17 February
(Netherlands) HDM	12
(Croatia) Mladost	2

Final
18 February
(Germany) Harvestehuder THC (s.o.)	6 (3)
(Netherlands) HDM	6 (2)
Third place
18 February
(Spain) Complutense	3
(Croatia) Mladost	4

=== Semi-finals ===
17 February 2024
18:35

Harvestehuder THC (Germany)	8–3	(Spain) Complutense
Körper 7', 8', 9', 11'; A. Pöhling 16'; Unterkircher 20', 40'; Von Gersum 38'	Report	Roman 6'; Sanz 11'; Rodríguez 19'

Umpires:
Celine Martin-Schmets (BEL)
Lukasz Zwierzchowski (POL)

17 February 2024
20:00

HDM (Netherlands)	12–2	(Croatia) Mladost
Schut 18', 30', 31', 32'; Cassiem 19', 36', 38'; Fontaine 23'; Groenheijde 25', 39'; Taberima 34'; De Gier 40'	Report	G. Fujs 20', 34'

Umpires:
Ben Goentgen (GER)
Andres Ortiz (ESP)

=== Third and fourth place ===
18 February 2024
12:30

Complutense (Spain)	3–4	(Croatia) Mladost
Curiel 10'; Hernandez 25'; Rodríguez 40'	Report	G. Fujs 5', 7'; Schmidt 16'; A. Fujs 17'

Umpires:
Duncan Ruzzak (SCO)
Michael Gholami-Eilmer (AUT)

=== Final ===
18 February 2024
14:00

Harvestehuder THC (Germany)	6–6	(Netherlands) HDM
Körper 7', 22', 24', 26', 27'; Unterkircher 27'	Report	Fontaine 1'; Taberima 4'; Schut 12'; Cassiem 17'; Groenheijde 33'; Versteeg 34'
Penalties
A. Pöhling (penalty shoot-out scored); Unterkircher (penalty shoot-out scored); Körper (penalty shoot-out scored)	3–2	(penalty shoot-out scored) Groenheijde; (penalty shoot-out missed) Fontaine; (penalty shoot-out scored) Cassiem

Umpires:
Andres Ortiz (ESP)
Celine Martin-Schmets (BEL)

== Statistics ==
=== Final standings ===
Pos	Team	Relegation
1st place, gold medalist(s)	(Germany) Harvestehuder THC (C)	
2nd place, silver medalist(s)	(Netherlands) HDM	
3rd place, bronze medalist(s)	(Croatia) Mladost	
4	(Spain) Complutense	
5	(Turkey) Gaziantep	
6	(Belgium) Léopold	
7	(England) Wimbledon (R)	EuroHockey Indoor Club Trophy
8	(France) LUC Ronchin (R)	EuroHockey Indoor Club Trophy
9	(Austria) Arminen (H, R)	EuroHockey Indoor Club Trophy
10	(Poland) Grunwald Poznań (R)	EuroHockey Indoor Club Trophy

Source: EHF
(C) Champion; (H) Host; (R) Relegated

=== Top goalscorers ===
Rank	Player	Team	FG	PC	PS	Goals
1	(Austria) Michael Körper	(Germany) Harvestehuder THC	12	11	2	25
2	(Austria) Fabian Unterkircher	(Germany) Harvestehuder THC	13	3	0	16
3	(Belgium) Maxime Plennevaux	(Belgium) Léopold	11	4	0	15
4	(South Africa) Mustapha Cassiem	(Netherlands) HDM	14	0	0	14
4	(Spain) Manuel Rodríguez	(Spain) Complutense	8	6	0	14
6	(Netherlands) Wiegert Schut	(Netherlands) HDM	8	3	0	11
6	(Belgium) Tanguy Zimmer	(Belgium) Léopold	11	0	0	11
8	(Netherlands) Chris Taberima	(Netherlands) HDM	7	2	0	9
9	(Spain) Cesar Curiel	(Spain) Complutense	8	0	0	8
9	(Croatia) Gregor Fujs	(Croatia) Mladost	1	7	0	8
9	(Turkey) Ali Akin Özkiliç	(Turkey) Gaziantep	8	0	0	8

== See also ==
- 2023–24 Men's Euro Hockey League
- 2024 Men's EuroHockey Indoor Championship
- 2024 Women's EuroHockey Indoor Club Cup
