= 2025 Men's EuroHockey Indoor Club Cup =

International indoor hockey competition

Tournament details
- Host country: Switzerland
- City: Wettingen
- Dates: 21–23 February
- Teams: 8 (from 8 associations)
- Venue: Tägi Sporthalle

Final positions
- Champions: (Belgium) Léopold (1st title)
- Runner-up: (Germany) Mannheimer HC
- Third place: (Spain) Complutense

Tournament statistics
- Matches played: 20
- Goals scored: 189 (9.45 per match)
- Top scorer: Philippe Simar (Léopold) (13 goals)
- Best player: Tanguy Zimmer (Léopold)
- Best young player: Ben Hasbach (Mannheimer HC)
- Best goalkeeper: Romain Henet (Léopold)

The 2025 Men's EuroHockey Indoor Club Cup was the 34th edition of the Men's EuroHockey Indoor Club Cup, Europe's premier indoor hockey club tournament for men organized by the European Hockey Federation. It was hosted by Rotweiss Wettingen at the Tägi Sporthalle in Wettingen, Switzerland from 21 to 23 February 2024.

Léopold won their first title and became the first Belgian club to win the tournament by defeating Mannheimer HC 2–0 in a shoot-out after the final finished 2–2. Complutense won the bronze medal by defeating Voordaan 2–1 in a shoot-out after the match finished 3–3. Gaziantep and OKS Vinnitsa finished in seventh and eighth place respectively, which means Turkey and Ukraine were relegated to the Club Trophy in 2026.

== Teams ==
The tournament returned to its original format with eight teams. England, France, Austria and Poland were relegated and were replaced by Ukraine and Switzerland who were promoted from the 2024 EuroHockey Indoor Club Trophy. Rotterdam originally qualified as the 2023–24 Dutch indoor champion, they withdrew on 11 October 2024 because the tournament did not fit into their preparation for the second half of the outdoor season. On 22 October 2024, it was announced Voordaan would replace Rotterdam as the runners-up from the 2023–24 Dutch indoor season.

- (Spain) Complutense
- (Turkey) Gaziantep
- (Belgium) Léopold
- (Germany) Mannheimer HC
- (Croatia) Mladost
- (Ukraine) OKS Vinnitsa
- (Switzerland) Rotweiss Wettingen
- (Netherlands) Voordaan

== Preliminary round ==
=== Pool A ===
Pos	Team	Pld	W	D	L	GF	GA	GD	Pts	Qualification
1	(Germany) Mannheimer HC	3	3	0	0	16	4	+12	15	Semi-finals
2	(Spain) Complutense	3	2	0	1	11	7	+4	11	Semi-finals
3	(Ukraine) OKS Vinnitsa	3	1	0	2	13	15	−2	6	
4	(Turkey) Gaziantep	3	0	0	3	8	22	−14	1	

Source: EHF
Rules for classification: 1) points; 2) matches won; 3) goal difference; 4) goals for; 5) head-to-head result; 6) field goals for.

21 February 2025
10:00

Complutense (Spain)	6–3	(Ukraine) OKS Vinnitsa
Garcia 19', 33', 40'; Álvarez-Villabol 26'; Ortiz 29'; Roman 37'	Report	Kaplinskyi 8', 38'; Popov 30'

Umpires:
Lukasz Orzeł (POL)
Lizelotte Wolter (NED)

21 February 2025
11:20

Mannheimer HC (Germany)	10–1	(Turkey) Gaziantep
Hasbach 3', 30'; Anzeneder 8'; Wentscher 18', 40'; Holste 23', 29'; Poljaric 27'; Hinrichs 35', 40'	Report	Demirel 40'

Umpires:
Daniel Denta (DEN)
Kamile Mockaityte (LTU)

21 February 2025
16:00

Gaziantep (Turkey)	5–8	(Ukraine) OKS Vinnitsa
A.A. Özkiliç 3', 29'; Elagöz 29', 40'; Ekinci 33'	Report	Popov 1', 14', 38', 38', 40'; Dzemukh 9'; Kaplinskyi 30', 31'

Umpires:
Thomas Hinsken (GER)
Ana Ortega (ESP)

21 February 2025
17:20

Complutense (Spain)	1–2	(Germany) Mannheimer HC
Muñoz 3'	Report	Holste 28'; Anzeneder 38'

Umpires:
Daniel Denta (DEN)
Maksym Perepelytsia (UKR)

22 February 2025
09:00

Mannheimer HC (Germany)	4–2	(Ukraine) OKS Vinnitsa
Reichert 15', 22'; Hasbach 30'; Poljaric 34'	Report	Kaplinskyi 11', 20'

Umpires:
Kamile Mockaityte (LTU)
Lizelotte Wolter (NED)

22 February 2025
10:20

Gaziantep (Turkey)	2–4	(Spain) Complutense
Ekinci 20'; Bohlouli 27'	Report	Muñoz 10', 12', 22'; Monterrubio 17'

Umpires:
Daniel Denta (NED)
Lukasz Orzeł (POL)

=== Pool B ===
Pos	Team	Pld	W	D	L	GF	GA	GD	Pts	Qualification
1	(Belgium) Léopold	3	3	0	0	29	13	+16	15	Semi-finals
2	(Netherlands) Voordaan	3	2	0	1	18	13	+5	11	Semi-finals
3	(Switzerland) Rotweiss Wettingen (H)	3	1	0	2	15	25	−10	5	
4	(Croatia) Mladost	3	0	0	3	11	22	−11	1	

Source: EHF
Rules for classification: 1) points; 2) matches won; 3) goal difference; 4) goals for; 5) head-to-head result; 6) field goals for.
(H) Hosts

21 February 2025
12:40

Voordaan (Netherlands)	4–6	(Belgium) Léopold
H. Plantenga 4', 19'; Van Battum 15', 34'	Report	Simar 2', 21', 39'; Zimmer 6'; Degroote 9'; Poncelet 30'

Umpires:
Tim Meissner (GER)
Ana Ortega (ESP)

21 February 2025
14:00

Mladost (Croatia)	4–6	(Switzerland) Rotweiss Wettingen
Jazbec 7', 30'; Kalinchuk 15', 35'	Report	M. Morard 4', 7', 35'; Bachofen 9', 28'; Conrad 22'

Umpires:
Gemma Calderon (ESP)
Maksym Perepelytsia UKR)

21 February 2025
18:40

Mladost (Croatia)	2–6	(Netherlands) Voordaan
Klink 4'; Strüven 29'	Report	Huisman 10+', 13', 18'; Van Battum 27'; H. Plantenga 37'; Ekelmans 39'

Umpires:
Tim Meissner (GER)
Gemma Calderon (ESP)

21 February 2025
20:00

Léopold (Belgium)	13–4	(Switzerland) Rotweiss Wettingen
Simar 3', 10', 21', 33'; Zimmer 15', 19'; Englebert 18', 26', 32', 34'; Leeuw 20'; Poncelet 30', 40'	Report	Bachofen 12'; Conrad 19', 25'; Y. Morard 23'

Umpires:
Kamile Mockaityte (LTU)
Lukasz Orzeł (POL)

22 February 2025
11:40

Léopold (Belgium)	10–5	(Croatia) Mladost
Simar 6', 40'; V. Lockwood 10+', 35'; Degroote 15', 23', 29'; I. Lockwood 19'; Poncelet 26'; Englebert 29'	Report	Zlatar 8'; Plennevaux 11'; Kalinchuk 13', 40'; Strüven 25'

Umpires:
Thomas Hinsken (GER)
Tim Meissner (GER)

22 February 2025
13:00

Voordaan (Netherlands)	8–5	(Switzerland) Rotweiss Wettingen
Huisman 5', 24', 29'; Dubbeldam 6', 25', 34'; H. Plantenga 22'; Tigchelhoff 29'	Report	M. Morard 30', 35', 38'; Y. Morard 37'; Aebi 38'

Umpires:
Gemma Calderon (ESP)
Ana Ortega (ESP)

== Fifth to eighth place classification ==
The points obtained in the preliminary round against the other team were carried over.

=== Pool C ===
Pos	Team	Pld	W	D	L	GF	GA	GD	Pts	Relegation
5	(Switzerland) Rotweiss Wettingen (H)	3	2	0	1	17	13	+4	11	
6	(Croatia) Mladost	3	2	0	1	16	13	+3	11	
7	(Turkey) Gaziantep (R)	3	1	0	2	17	19	−2	6	EuroHockey Indoor Club Trophy
8	(Ukraine) OKS Vinnitsa (R)	3	1	0	2	12	17	−5	5	EuroHockey Indoor Club Trophy

Source: EHF
Rules for classification: 1) points; 2) matches won; 3) goal difference; 4) goals for; 5) head-to-head result; 6) field goals for.
(H) Hosts; (R) Relegated

22 February 2025
16:30

Gaziantep (Turkey)	5–6	(Croatia) Mladost
A.A. Özkiliç 3', 35'; Ekinci 8', 40'; Müslüm Elagöz 39'	Report	Kalinchuk 5', 27', 32'; Jazbec 14', 38'; Klink 31'

Umpires:
Thomas Hinsken (GER)
Maksym Perepelytsia (UKR)

22 February 2025
17:50

OKS Vinnitsa (Ukraine)	2–6	(Switzerland) Rotweiss Wettingen
Kaplinskyi 20+'; Hrubyi 38'	Report	Aebi 11', 27'; Y. Morard 20', 26'; Pagliara 23'; Kirschbaum 38'

Umpires:
Gemma Calderon (ESP)
Lukasz Orzeł (POL)

23 February 2025
09:40

OKS Vinnitsa (Ukraine)	2–6	(Croatia) Mladost
Zhmereniuk 6'; Kaplinskyi 12'	Report	Kalinchuk 9', 10', 32', 35'; Gjurinski 22'; Plennevaux 30'

Umpires:
Gemma Calderon (ESP)
Lizelotte Wolter (NED)

23 February 2025
11:00

Rotweiss Wettingen (Switzerland)	5–7	(Turkey) Gaziantep
Y. Morard 1', 29'; Conrad 20'; Fischbach 20'; M. Morard 34'	Report	A.A. Özkiliç 17'; Elagöz 19', 23', 24', 30', 33', 40'

Umpires:
Daniel Denta (DEN)
Lukasz Orzeł (POL)

== First to fourth place classification ==
=== Bracket ===
Semi-finals
22 February
(Germany) Mannheimer HC	8
(Netherlands) Voordaan	2
22 February
(Belgium) Léopold	5
(Spain) Complutense	4

Final
23 February
(Germany) Mannheimer HC	2 (0)
(Belgium) Léopold (s.o.)	2 (2)
Third place
23 February
(Netherlands) Voordaan	3 (1)
(Spain) Complutense (s.o.)	3 (2)

=== Semi-finals ===
22 February 2025
19:15

Mannheimer HC (Germany)	8–2	(Netherlands) Voordaan
Anzeneder 1'; Wentscher 7', 39'; Hasbach 13', 28'; Holste 18'; Hinrichs 24'; Fischer 37'	Report	H. Plantenga 21'; Huisman 35'

Umpires:
Kamile Mockaityte (LTU)
Ana Ortega (ESP)

22 February 2025
20:45

Léopold (Belgium)	5–4	(Spain) Complutense
Simar 4', 31', 32', 33'; I. Lockwood 7'	Report	Garcia 12'; Muñoz 20', 21', 30'

Umpires:
Tim Meissner (GER)
Lizelotte Wolter (NED)

=== Third and fourth place ===
23 February 2025
12:30

Voordaan (Netherlands)	3–3	(Spain) Complutense
Van Battum 17', 31'; Koopmans 36'	Report	Gallego 3'; Monterrubio 32'; Roman 38'
Penalties
Huisman (penalty shoot-out scored); H. Plantenga (penalty shoot-out missed); K. Plantenga (penalty shoot-out missed)	1–2	(penalty shoot-out scored) Roman; (penalty shoot-out scored) Garcia; (penalty shoot-out missed) Muñoz

Umpires:
Thomas Hinsken (GER)
Tim Meissner (GER)

=== Final ===
23 February 2025
14:00

Mannheimer HC (Germany)	2–2	(Belgium) Léopold
Hasbach 30'; Anzeneder 34'	Report	Degroote 12', 27'
Penalties
Fischer (penalty shoot-out missed); Anzeneder (penalty shoot-out missed)	0–2	(penalty shoot-out scored) Degroote; (penalty shoot-out missed) I. Lockwood; (penalty shoot-out scored) V. Lockwood

Umpires:
Kamile Mockaityte (LTU)
Ana Ortega (ESP)

== Statistics ==
=== Final standings ===
Pos	Team	Relegation
1st place, gold medalist(s)	(Belgium) Léopold	
2nd place, silver medalist(s)	(Germany) Mannheimer HC	
3rd place, bronze medalist(s)	(Spain) Complutense	
4	(Netherlands) Voordaan	
5	(Switzerland) Rotweiss Wettingen (H)	
6	(Croatia) Mladost	
7	(Turkey) Gaziantep (R)	EuroHockey Indoor Club Trophy
8	(Ukraine) OKS Vinnitsa (R)	EuroHockey Indoor Club Trophy

Source: EHF
(H) Host; (R) Relegated

=== Top goalscorers ===
Rank	Player	Team	FG	PC	PS	Goals
1	(Belgium) Philippe Simar	(Belgium) Léopold	11	2	0	13
2	(Ukraine) Vitalii Kalinchuk	(Croatia) Mladost	7	4	0	11
3	(Turkey) Müslüm Elagöz	(Turkey) Gaziantep	5	3	1	9
4	(Ukraine) Volodymyr Kaplinskyi	(Ukraine) OKS Vinnitsa	4	4	0	8
5	(Netherlands) Mike Huisman	(Netherlands) Voordaan	5	2	0	7
5	(Spain) Juan Muñoz	(Spain) Complutense	3	3	1	7
5	(Switzerland) Michel Morard	(Switzerland) Rotweiss Wettingen	1	6	0	7
8	(Switzerland) Yves Morard	(Switzerland) Rotweiss Wettingen	5	0	1	6
8	(Ukraine) Oleksii Popov	(Ukraine) OKS Vinnitsa	5	0	1	6
8	(Germany) Ben Hasbach	(Germany) Mannheimer HC	4	1	1	6
8	(Belgium) Tom Degroote	(Belgium) Léopold	2	3	1	6

== See also ==
- 2024–25 Men's Euro Hockey League
- 2025 Women's EuroHockey Indoor Club Cup
