= 2026 Women's EuroHockey Indoor Club Cup =

Indoor hockey tournament in Zalasewo, Poland

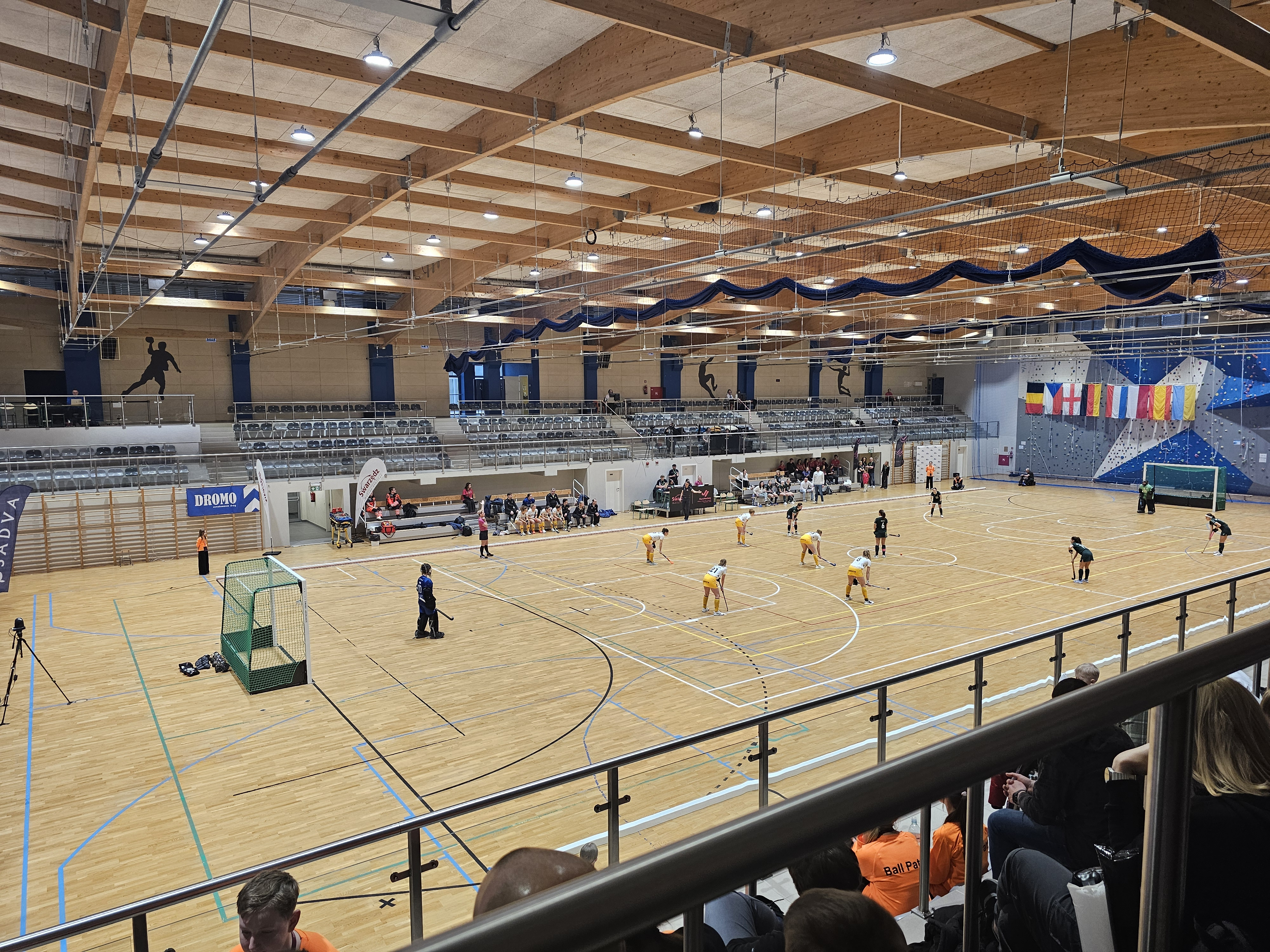

Tournament details
- Host country: Poland
- City: Zalasewo
- Dates: 20–22 February
- Teams: 8 (from 8 associations)
- Venue: Swarzędz Sports Hall

Final positions
- Champions: (Belgium) Waterloo Ducks (1st title)
- Runner-up: (Netherlands) Den Bosch
- Third place: (England) East Grinstead

Tournament statistics
- Matches played: 20
- Goals scored: 132 (6.6 per match)
- Top scorer: Daphné Gose (Waterloo Ducks) (14 goals)
- Best player: France De Mot (Waterloo Ducks)
- Best goalkeeper: Matilda Woodhead (East Grinstead)

The 2026 Women's EuroHockey Indoor Club Cup was the 34th edition of the Women's EuroHockey Indoor Club Cup, Europe's premier indoor hockey club tournament for women organized by the European Hockey Federation. It was held at the Swarzędz Sports Hall in Zalasewo, Poland from 20 to 22 February 2026.

Sumchanka were the defending champions, they did not defend their title as they were elimanted in the preliminary round.

Waterloo Ducks won the tournament for the first time in their history and became the first Belgian club to do so by defeating Den Bosch 2–1 in a shoot-out as the final finished 2–2. East Grinstead won the bronze medal as they defeated Mannheimer HC 6–2. Club de Campo and the hosts Swarek Swarzędz finished in seventh and eighth place respectively, which means Spain and Poland were relegated to the Club Trophy in 2027.

== Teams ==
The participating clubs have qualified for each division based on their country's final ranking from the 2025 competition. Lithuania and Turkey were relegated and were replaced by Poland and England who were promoted from the 2025 EuroHockey Indoor Club Trophy. Rotterdam originally qualified as the 2024–25 Dutch indoor champion, they withdrew because the tournament did not fit into their preparation for the second half of the outdoor season. They were replaced by Den Bosch, the runners-up from the 2024–25 Dutch indoor season.

- (Spain) Club de Campo
- (Netherlands) ~~Rotterdam~~ Den Bosch
- (England) East Grinstead
- (Germany) Mannheimer HC
- (Czech Republic) Slavia Prague
- (Ukraine) Sumchanka
- (Poland) Swarek Swarzędz
- (Belgium) Waterloo Ducks

== Preliminary round ==
=== Pool A ===
Pos	Team	Pld	W	D	L	GF	GA	GD	Pts	Qualification
1	(Belgium) Waterloo Ducks	3	3	0	0	18	5	+13	15	Semi-finals
2	(Germany) Mannheimer HC	3	2	0	1	10	10	0	10	Semi-finals
3	(Ukraine) Sumchanka	3	1	0	2	11	12	−1	7	
4	(Poland) Swarek Swarzędz (H)	3	0	0	3	9	21	−12	1	

Source: EHF
Rules for classification: 1) points; 2) matches won; 3) goal difference; 4) goals for; 5) head-to-head result; 6) field goals for.
(H) Hosts

20 February 2026
12:40

Sumchanka (Ukraine)	2–4	(Belgium) Waterloo Ducks
Leonova 16', 40'	Report	De Mot 3', 23', 30'; Gose 35'

Umpires:
Katie Howie (SCO)
Paula Slawinska (POL)

20 February 2026
14:00

Mannheimer HC (Germany)	6–2	(Poland) Swarek Swarzędz
Reichert 5'; Bantow 16'; Roth 19', 33'; Hochstetter 25'; Wellhöfer 35'	Report	Drozda 20'; Rubacha 31'

Umpires:
Montserrat Solorzano (ESP)
Alexandra Mahieu (BEL)

20 February 2026
18:40

Mannheimer HC (Germany)	4–3	(Ukraine) Sumchanka
Bantow 2'; Roth 23'; Godenschwege 27'; Korth 29'	Report	Leonova 7', 12', 13'

Umpires:
Vilma Bagdanskiene (LTU)
Viv Carveth (ENG)

20 February 2026
20:00

Waterloo Ducks (Belgium)	9–3	(Poland) Swarek Swarzędz
Gose 2', 8', 10', 24', 39'; De Mot 5', 36', 40' van der Gracht 29'	Report	Arciszewska 1'; Czujewicz 34', 37'

Umpires:
Abby MacArthur (WAL)
Manouk Bakker (NED)

21 February 2026
11:40

Waterloo Ducks (Belgium)	5–0	(Germany) Mannheimer HC
Gose 9', 10', 14', 32', 32'	Report

Umpires:
Viv Carveth (ENG)
Manouk Bakker (NED)

21 February 2026
13:00

Sumchanka (Ukraine)	6–4	(Poland) Swarek Swarzędz
Leonova 5', 20'; Korobkina 9'; Honcharenko 23'; Movchan 30'; Shyshyna 38'	Report	Arciszewska 22', 40'; Drozda 32'; Rubacha 37'

Umpires:
Katie Howie (SCO)
Alexandra Mahieu (BEL)

=== Pool B ===
Pos	Team	Pld	W	D	L	GF	GA	GD	Pts	Qualification
1	(Netherlands) Den Bosch	3	3	0	0	9	4	+5	15	Semi-finals
2	(England) East Grinstead	3	1	0	2	8	8	0	7	Semi-finals
3	(Spain) Club de Campo	3	1	0	2	5	7	−2	7	
4	(Czech Republic) Slavia Prague	3	1	0	2	10	13	−3	6	

Source: EHF
Rules for classification: 1) points; 2) matches won; 3) goal difference; 4) goals for; 5) head-to-head result; 6) field goals for.

20 February 2026
10:00

Den Bosch (Netherlands)	5–2	(Czech Republic) Slavia Prague
van der Hoek 17'; Brinkman 24', 34'; Pol 39'	Report	Hájková 23', 37'

Umpires:
Abby MacArthur (WAL)
Viv Carveth (ENG)

20 February 2026
11:20

Club de Campo (Spain)	2–1	(England) East Grinstead
Abajo Saenz De Tejada 22'; B. Garcia 37'	Report	Balcerzak 30'

Umpires:
Vilma Bagdanskiene (LTU)
Manouk Bakker (NED)

20 February 2026
16:00

Slavia Prague (Czech Republic)	3–5	(England) East Grinstead
Hájková 28'; Babická 30'; Lehovcová 37'	Report	Mills 10', 24', 28', 39', 40'

Umpires:
Paula Slawinska (POL)
Montserrat Solorzano (ESP)

20 February 2026
17:20

Club de Campo (Spain)	0–1	(Netherlands) Den Bosch
	Report	Brinkman 34'

Umpires:
Katie Howie (SCO)
Sophie Parker (ENG)

21 February 2026
09:00

Den Bosch (Netherlands)	3–2	(England) East Grinstead
Bekkers 12'; Brinkman 23'; Wijckmans 38'	Report	Brown 15'; Mills 34'

Umpires:
Vilma Bagdanskiene (LTU)
Montserrat Solorzano (ESP)

21 February 2026
10:20

Slavia Prague (Czech Republic)	5–3	(Spain) Club de Campo
Duchková 3', 7', 16'; Lehovcová 13'; Hájková 25'	Report	Barrios 26'; Abajo Sáenz de Tejada 31', 32'

Umpires:
Sophie Parker (ENG)
Abby MacArthur (WAL)

== Fifth to eighth place classification ==
The points obtained in the preliminary round against the other team were carried over.

=== Pool C ===
Pos	Team	Pld	W	D	L	GF	GA	GD	Pts	Relegation
5	(Ukraine) Sumchanka	3	3	0	0	14	8	+6	15	
6	(Czech Republic) Slavia Prague	3	2	0	1	16	7	+9	11	
7	(Spain) Club de Campo	3	1	0	2	12	11	+1	6	EuroHockey Indoor Club Trophy
8	(Poland) Swarek Swarzędz (H)	3	0	0	3	6	22	−16	1	EuroHockey Indoor Club Trophy

Source: EHF
Rules for classification: 1) points; 2) matches won; 3) goal difference; 4) goals for; 5) head-to-head result; 6) field goals for.
(H) Hosts

21 February 2026
16:30

Swarek Swarzędz (Poland)	1–9	(Czech Republic) Slavia Prague
Kosińska 24'	Report	Fuxová 5'; Duchková 10', 16'; Uhrová 12'; Nováková 14', 35'; Babická 30', 36', 40'

Umpires:
Vilma Bagdanskiene (LTU)
Viv Carveth (ENG)

21 February 2026
17:50

Sumchanka (Ukraine)	5–2	(Spain) Club de Campo
Movchan 8'; Honcharenko 14', 17', 22', 32'	Report	M. Garcia 5'; Lagunas 8'

Umpires:
Paula Slawinska (POL)
Alexandra Mahieu (BEL)

22 February 2026
09:30

Sumchanka (Ukraine)	3–2	(Czech Republic) Slavia Prague
Leonova 1', 30'; Popova 30'	Report	Babická 2'; Duchková 35'

Umpires:
Montserrat Solórzano (ESP)
Paula Slawinska (POL)

22 February 2026
11:00

Club de Campo (Spain)	7–1	(Poland) Swarek Swarzędz
Gonzalez 10', 22'; B. Garcia 14', 19'; Torres-Quevedo 21'; M. Garcia 26'; Barrios 34'	Report	Arciszewska 40'

Umpires:
Viv Carveth (ENG)
Sophie Parker (ENG)

== First to fourth place classification ==
=== Bracket ===
Semi-finals
21 February
(Belgium) Waterloo Ducks	4
(England) East Grinstead	2
21 February
(Netherlands) Den Bosch	3
(Germany) Mannheimer HC	1

Final
22 February
(Belgium) Waterloo Ducks (s.o.)	2 (2)
(Netherlands) Den Bosch	2 (1)
Third place
22 February
(England) East Grinstead	6
(Germany) Mannheimer HC	2

=== Semi-finals ===
21 February 2026
19:15

Waterloo Ducks (Belgium)	4–2	(England) East Grinstead
de Mot 2', 38'; Gose 28', 33'	Report	Mills 11', 23'

Umpires:
Manouk Bakker (NED)
Katie Howie (SCO)

21 February 2026
20:45

Den Bosch (Netherlands)	3–1	(Germany) Mannheimer HC
Bekkers 37' van der Hoek 38', 40'	Report	Roth 20'

Umpires:
Abby Macarthur (WAL)
Sophie Parker (ENG)

=== Third and fourth place ===
22 February 2026
12:30

East Grinstead (England)	6–2	(Germany) Mannheimer HC
Mills 8', 23', 30', 31', 33'; Gomez 22'	Report	Roth 32'; Korth 38'

Umpires:
Manouk Bakker (NED)
Alexandra Mahieu (BEL)

=== Final ===
22 February 2026
14:00

Waterloo Ducks (Belgium)	2–2	(Netherlands) Den Bosch
Gose 1' de Mot 30'	Report	Bekkers 7', 30'
Penalties
de Mot (penalty shoot-out scored); Gose (penalty shoot-out scored); Balon-Perin (penalty shoot-out missed)	2–1	(penalty shoot-out scored) Reijnen; (penalty shoot-out missed) Bekkers; (penalty shoot-out missed) de Wit

Umpires:
Abby Macarthur (WAL)
Katie Howie (SCO)

== Statistics ==
=== Final standings ===
Pos	Team	Relegation
1st place, gold medalist(s)	(Belgium) Waterloo Ducks	
2nd place, silver medalist(s)	(Netherlands) Den Bosch	
3rd place, bronze medalist(s)	(England) East Grinstead	
4	(Germany) Mannheimer HC	
5	(Ukraine) Sumchanka	
6	(Czech Republic) Slavia Prague	
7	(Spain) Club de Campo (R)	EuroHockey Indoor Club Trophy
8	(Poland) Swarek Swarzędz (H, R)	EuroHockey Indoor Club Trophy

Source: EHF
(H) Host; (R) Relegated

=== Top goalscorers ===
Rank	Player	Team	FG	PC	PS	Goals
1	(Belgium) Daphné Gose	(Belgium) Waterloo Ducks	9	5	0	14
2	(England) Biba Mills	(England) East Grinstead	5	6	2	13
3	(Ukraine) Karyna Leonova	(Ukraine) Sumchanka	9	0	0	9
3	(Belgium) France De Mot	(Belgium) Waterloo Ducks	4	3	2	9
5	(Czech Republic) Lucie Duchková	(Czech Republic) Slavia Prague	1	5	0	6
6	(Czech Republic) Nikol Babická	(Czech Republic) Slavia Prague	5	0	0	5
6	(Germany) Clara Roth	(Germany) Mannheimer HC	5	0	0	5
6	(Ukraine) Olha Honcharenko	(Ukraine) Sumchanka	2	1	2	5

== See also ==
- 2026 Men's EuroHockey Indoor Club Cup
- 2026 Women's Euro Hockey League
