= 2022 Men's EuroHockey Indoor Club Cup =

International indoor hockey competition

Tournament details
- Host country: Turkey
- City: Alanya
- Dates: 11–13 February
- Teams: 7 (from 7 associations)
- Venue: Alanya Atatürk Spor Salonu

Final positions
- Champions: (Russia) Dinamo Elektrostal (1st title)
- Runner-up: (Croatia) Zelina
- Third place: (Austria) Post SV

Tournament statistics
- Matches played: 21
- Goals scored: 235 (11.19 per match)
- Top scorer: (Austria) Fabian Unterkircher (26 goals)
- Best player: (Austria) Fabian Unterkircher
- Best goalkeeper: (Croatia) Zoran Jakopović

The 2022 Men's EuroHockey Indoor Club Cup was the 32nd edition of the Men's EuroHockey Indoor Club Cup, Europe's premier men's club indoor hockey tournament organized by the European Hockey Federation. It was held at the Alanya Atatürk Spor Salonu in Alanya, Turkey from 11 to 13 February 2022.

== Teams ==
Participating clubs qualified based on their country's final rankings from the 2020 competition. The champions from the top six countries from last year's edition together with the top two from the 2020 EuroHockey Indoor Club Trophy were qualified. Croatia and Turkey were the two promoted countries that replaced Belgium and Sweden. Rot-Weiss Köln had to withdraw from the tournament due to several players testing positive for COVID-19.

1. ~~(Germany) Rot-Weiss Köln~~
2. (Poland) AZS AWF Poznań
3. (Spain) Complutense
4. (Croatia) Zelina
5. (Austria) Post SV
6. (Belarus) Minsk
7. (Russia) Dinamo Elektrostal
8. (Turkey) Gaziantep

== Standings ==
Pos	Team	Pld	W	D	L	GF	GA	GD	Pts
1	(Russia) Dinamo Elektrostal (C)	6	6	0	0	49	20	+29	30
2	(Croatia) Zelina	6	5	0	1	42	26	+16	25
3	(Austria) Post SV	6	4	0	2	44	21	+23	21
4	(Spain) Complutense	6	3	0	3	35	21	+14	16
5	(Turkey) Gaziantep (H)	6	2	0	4	33	37	−4	12
6	(Belarus) Minsk	6	1	0	5	22	48	−26	5
7	(Poland) AZS AWF Poznań	6	0	0	6	10	62	−52	0

Source: EHF
Rules for classification: 1) points; 2) matches won; 3) goal difference; 4) goals for; 5) head-to-head result; 6) field goals scored.
(C) Champions; (H) Hosts

== Results ==
11 February 2021
10:00

Zelina (Croatia)	9–1	(Poland) AZS AWF Poznań
Kovalenko 6', 17'; Shevchuk 21', 31', 32'; Draguhn 23'; Rabente 29'; Bahlen 37'; Lykov 40'	Report	Kurniewicz 24'

Umpires:
Bart de Liefde (NED)
Mikhail Golovanov (RUS)

11 February 2021
11:15

Dinamo Elektrostal (Russia)	7–3	(Spain) Complutense
Arusiia 4'; Proskuriakov 10'; Samylkin 13', 17'; Lepeshkin 24', 40'; A. Kuraev 32'	Report	Nahr 14'; Prol 20'; Rodríguez 23'

Umpires:
Alex Fedenczuk (SCO)
Lukasz Orzel(POL)

11 February 2021
12:30

Gaziantep (Turkey)	8–5	(Belarus) Minsk
Aydin 2', 15'; Valdes 5'; Elagöz 17', 18', 37'; Özkiliç 30'; Norouzzadeh 34'	Report	Stsepanets 23', 29', 35'; Belavusau 38', 40'

Umpires:
Sean Edwards (ENG)
Tim Meissner (GER)

11 February 2021
14:00

Zelina (Croatia)	7–4	(Austria) Post SV
Lykov 10', 30', 32'; Draguhn 14', 28'; Weß 18', 31'	Report	Unterkircher 13', 20', 26', 27'

Umpires:
Benjamin Messerli (SUI)
Aliaksandr Hrachou (BLR)

11 February 2021
16:00

Dinamo Elektrostal (Russia)	13–0	(Poland) AZS AWF Poznań
Lepeshkin 1'; Proskuriakov 1', 17', 35', 38'; Artemov 2', 8', 18'; Arusiia 4', 16', 19'; Loginov 10'; Samylkin 31'	Report

Umpires:
Tim Meissner (GER)
Alex Fedenczuk (SCO)

11 February 2021
17:15

Minsk (Belarus)	1–8	(Spain) Complutense
Belavusau 40'	Report	Prol 8', 17', 38'; Cobos 16', 19'; Nahr 22', 39'; Muñoz 28'

Umpires:
Michiel Otten (NED)
Mikhail Golovanov (RUS)

11 February 2021
18:30

Gaziantep (Turkey)	4–10	(Austria) Post SV
Özkiliç 13'; Aydin 26'; Elagöz 28'; Norouzzadeh 35'	Report	Wellan 10', 11', 21', 32'; Valas 17'; Scholz 20'; Unterkircher 28', 40'; Szmidt 36'; B. Stanzl 40+'

Umpires:
Bart de Liefde (NED)
Sean Edwards (ENG)

12 February 2021
10:00

Post SV (Austria)	5–2	(Spain) Complutense
Unterkircher 4', 8', 17', 29'; Wellan 22'	Report	Cobos 4', 40'

Umpires:
Tim Meissner (GER)
Michiel Otten (NED)

12 February 2021
11:15

Zelina (Croatia)	9–4	(Belarus) Minsk
Shevchuk 6', 34', 35'; Draguhn 10', 19', 20', 30'; Lykov 22', 37'	Report	Staradub 26'; Khatyliou 34'; Krysiuk 35'; Stsepanets 39'

Umpires:
Bart de Liefde (NED)
Benjamin Messerli (SUI)

12 February 2021
12:30

Gaziantep (Turkey)	10–3	(Poland) AZS AWF Poznań
Norouzzadeh 3', 5', 28', 35'; Aydin 20', 29'; Elagöz 26'; Özkiliç 27', 33', 37'	Report	Kurniewicz 2', 4', 31'

Umpires:
Mikhail Golovanov (RUS)
Aliaksandr Hrachou (BLR)

12 February 2021
14:00

Post SV (Austria)	5–6	(Russia) Dinamo Elektrostal
Unterkircher 2', 34'; Mar. Nyckowiak 7', 8'; B. Stanzl 17'	Report	Arusiia 9', 24', 33'; Samylkin 18'; A. Kuraev 25'; Khairullin 34'

Umpires:
Lukasz Orzel (POL)
Sean Edwards (ENG)

12 February 2021
16:00

Complutense (Spain)	3–5	(Croatia) Zelina
Muñoz 3', 8'; Cobos 23'	Report	Draguhn 2'; Shevchuk 5', 10', 23'; Lykov 23'

Umpires:
Benjamin Messerli (SUI)
Michiel Otten (NED)

12 February 2021
17:15

AZS AWF Poznań (Poland)	4–8	(Belarus) Minsk
Pawlak 16', 33', 36'; Kozan 19'	Report	Belavusau 4', 18', 30', 39'; Stsepanets 16', 23'; Staradub 26'; Luppa 27'

Umpires:
Tim Meissner (GER)
Bart de Liefde (NED)

12 February 2021
18:30

Dinamo Elektrostal (Russia)	7–5	(Turkey) Gaziantep
Dvoretskii 6', 13'; Khairullin 6'; Lepeshkin 13'; Proskuriakov 28'; Arusiia 30+', 33'	Report	Norouzzadeh 9', 16', 30'; Elagöz 17'; Aydin 38'

Umpires:
Lukasz Orzel (POL)
Alex Fedenczuk (SCO)

13 February 2021
09:30

Post SV (Austria)	8–0	(Poland) AZS AWF Poznań
Szmidt 5', 26'; Unterkircher 14', 16', 23', 32', 38', 40'	Report

Umpires:
Aliaksandr Hrachou (BLR)
Alex Fedenczuk (SCO)

13 February 2021
10:45

Dinamo Elektrostal (Russia)	7–2	(Belarus) Minsk
Arusiia 13'; Proskuriakov 20', 29', 30'; Khairullin 27'; Dvoretskii 32'; A. Kuraev 40'	Report	Khatyliou 17'; Luppa 22'

Umpires:
Michiel Otten (NED)
Benjamin Messerli (SUI)

13 February 2021
12:00

Gaziantep (Turkey)	5–7	(Croatia) Zelina
Aydin 2'; Rahimipour 10', 16'; Norouzzadeh 21', 39'	Report	Draguhn 4', 26'; Kovalenko 14'; Rabente 15', 20', 30'; Ilinović 35'

Umpires:
Mikhail Golovanov (RUS)
Sean Edwards (ENG)

13 February 2021
13:15

AZS AWF Poznań (Poland)	2–14	(Spain) Complutense
Pawlak 23'; Mazany 40'	Report	Prol 4', 11'; Cobos 12', 28', 28', 28', 35'; Muñoz 13'; Nahr 17', 24', 35', 39'; Sanz 18'; Rodríguez 30'

Umpires:
Tim Meissner (GER)
Aliaksandr Hrachou (BLR)

13 February 2021
15:00

Post SV (Austria)	12–2	(Belarus) Minsk
Unterkircher 2', 9', 13', 15', 19', 23', 32', 35'; B. Stanzl 3'; Szmidt 5', 40'; Wellan 25'	Report	Khatyliou 5'; Stsepanets 14'

Umpires:
Lukas Orzel (POL)
Alex Fedenczuk (SCO)

13 February 2021
16:15

Dinamo Elektrostal (Russia)	9–5	(Croatia) Zelina
Khairullin 2'; Samylkin 7', 40'; A. Kuraev 10+'; Dvoretski 12', 23'; Lepeshkin 29'; Proskuriakov 30', 35'	Report	Rabente 2'; Draguhn 9', 13', 32', 36'

Umpires:
Bart de Liefde (NED)
Sean Edwards (ENG)

13 February 2021
17:30

Complutense (Spain)	5–1	(Turkey) Gaziantep
Prol 10', 25'; Rodríguez 28'; Cobos 32'; Muñoz 35'	Report	Elagöz 33'

Umpires:
Michiel Otten (NED)
Mikhail Golovanov (RUS)

== Top goalscorers ==
Rank	Player	Team	FG	PC	PS	Goals
1	(Austria) Fabian Unterkircher	(Austria) Post SV	11	11	4	26
2	(Germany) Sebastian Draguhn	(Croatia) Zelina	6	8	0	14
3	(Spain) Ignacio Cobos	(Spain) Complutense	10	0	1	11
3	(Russia) Mikhail Proskuriakov	(Russia) Dinamo Elektrostal	7	3	1	11
3	(Iran) Reza Norouzzadeh	(Turkey) Gaziantep	5	6	0	11
6	(Russia) Georgii Arusiia	(Russia) Dinamo Elektrostal	2	4	4	10
7	(Ukraine) Vitalii Shevchuk	(Croatia) Zelina	8	1	0	9
8	(Spain) Manuel Prol	(Spain) Complutense	0	6	2	8
9	(Turkey) Celal Aydin	(Turkey) Gaziantep	7	0	0	7
9	(Germany) Marvin Nahr	(Spain) Complutense	5	2	0	7
9	(Russia) Aleksandr Lykov	(Croatia) Zelina	5	2	0	7
9	(Turkey) Müslüm Elagöz	(Turkey) Gaziantep	3	4	0	7
9	(Belarus) Uladzislau Belavusau	(Belarus) Minsk	2	5	0	7
9	(Belarus) Yauheni Stsepanets	(Belarus) Minsk	2	5	0	7

== See also ==
- 2022 Euro Hockey League
- 2022 Women's EuroHockey Indoor Club Cup
