= EuroHockey Indoor Club Cup =

EuroHockey Indoor Club Cup may refer to:

- Men's EuroHockey Indoor Club Cup
- Women's EuroHockey Indoor Club Cup
