= 2012 Men's EuroHockey Junior Championship =

Hockey tournament

2019 Men's EuroHockey Junior Championship
Tournament details
- Host country: Netherlands
- City: 's-Hertogenbosch
- Dates: 26 August–1 September
- Teams: 8 (from 1 confederation)
- Venue: HC Den Bosch

Final positions
- Champions: Belgium (1st title)
- Runner-up: Netherlands
- Third place: Germany

Tournament statistics
- Matches played: 20
- Goals scored: 111 (5.55 per match)
- Top scorer: (Belgium) Loïck Luypaert (7 goals)
- Best player: (Netherlands) Glenn Schuurman

The 2012 Men's EuroHockey Junior Championship was the 16th edition of the men's EuroHockey Junior Championship, the biennial international men's under-21 field hockey championship of Europe organised by the European Hockey Federation. It was held alongside the women's tournament in 's-Hertogenbosch, Netherlands from 20 August to 1 September 2012.

This tournament served as the European qualifier for the 2013 FIH Junior World Cup, with the top six teams qualifying.

Belgium won the tournament for the first time by defeating the Netherlands 4–3 in penalties after the final finished as a 2–2 draw. Germany won the bronze model by defeating France 8–0.

== Qualified teams ==
The following eight team qualified based on their final positions in the 2010 EuroHockey Junior Championships.

Dates	Event	Location	Quotas	Qualifiers
25 – 31 July 2010	2010 EuroHockey Junior Championship	Siemianowice Śląskie, Poland	6	Belgium; England; France; Germany; Netherlands; Spain
25 – 31 July 2010	2010 EuroHockey Junior Championship II	Vienna, Austria	2	Scotland; Wales
Total			8	

== Results ==
All times are local, CEST (UTC+2).

=== Preliminary round ===
==== Pool A ====
Pos	Team	Pld	W	D	L	GF	GA	GD	Pts	Qualification
1	Netherlands	3	3	0	0	10	3	+7	9	Semi-finals
2	France	3	2	0	1	10	6	+4	6	Semi-finals
3	England	3	1	0	2	7	7	0	3	Pool C
4	Wales	3	0	0	3	4	15	−11	0	Pool C

Source: EuroHockey
Rules for classification: 1) points; 2) goal difference; 3) goals scored; 4) head-to-head result.

26 August 2012
16:45

England	4–1	Wales
Condon 6', 66'; Farrant 29'; Jackson 55'	Report	Shipperley 8'

Umpires:
Grant Hundley (USA)
Andrés Ortíz (ESP)

26 August 2012
17:15

Netherlands	2–1	France
Brinkman 18'; Schuurman 67'	Report	Martin-Brisac 53'

Umpires:
Nicholas Marchant (BEL)
Ben Göntgen (GER)

28 August 2012
18:45

France	5–1	Wales
Genestet 14', 31', 68'; Martin-Brisac 23'; Kieffer 53'	Report	Hassan 62'

Umpires:
Daniel Clarke (IRE)
Nicholas Marchant (BEL)

28 August 2012
19:15

England	0–2	Netherlands
	Report	Galema 57'; Hiebendaal 70'

Umpires:
Grant Hundley (USA)
Andrés Ortíz (ESP)

29 August 2012
18:45

France	4–3	England
Baumgarten 31', 34'; Martin-Brisac 64'; Genestet 67'	Report	Gilham-Jones 51'; Bowden 65'; Bull 70'

Umpires:
Ben Göntgen (GER)
Michiel Otten (NED)

29 August 2012
19:15

Netherlands	6–2	Wales
Schuurman 5', 19'; Hiebendaal 31'; Leijs 48'; Bovendeert 53'; Brinkman 54'	Report	Pacey 65'; Gowman 67'

Umpires:
Marcus Powell (WAL)
Nicholas Bennett (ENG)

==== Pool B ====
Pos	Team	Pld	W	D	L	GF	GA	GD	Pts	Qualification
1	Belgium	3	2	1	0	13	3	+10	7	Semi-finals
2	Germany	3	2	1	0	11	5	+6	7	Semi-finals
3	Spain	3	1	0	2	6	9	−3	3	Pool C
4	Scotland	3	0	0	3	4	17	−13	0	Pool C

Source: EuroHockey
Rules for classification: 1) points; 2) goal difference; 3) goals scored; 4) head-to-head result.

26 August 2012
12:15

Germany	6–1	Scotland
Grambusch 5'; Swiatek 22'; Nguyen 25'; Rühr 37'; Ebeling 45'; Wellen 51'	Report	Lindsay 68'

Umpires:
Xavier Fenaert (FRA)
Michiel Otten (NED)

26 August 2012
12:45

Belgium	4–0	Spain
Luypaert 18', 61'; Hendrickx 28'; Cosyns 46'	Report

Umpires:
Daniel Clarke (IRE)
Nicholas Bennett (ENG)

28 August 2012
16:30

Spain	4–2	Scotland
Boltó 6'; De Frutos 48', 49'; Beltrán 56'	Report	Bremmer 12'; Duncan 66'

Umpires:
Nicholas Bennett (ENG)
Michiel Otten (NED)

28 August 2012
17:00

Germany	2–2	Belgium
Windfeder 31'; Swiatek 40'	Report	Plennevaux 25'; Peeters 30'

Umpires:
Ian Diamond (SCO)
Marcus Powell (WAL)

29 August 2012
14:15

Spain	2–3	Germany
Mercadé 41'; Parente 52'	Report	Grambusch 24'; Bädelt 59'; Nitschke 67'

Umpires:
Daniel Clarke (IRE)
Xavier Fenaert (FRA)

29 August 2012
14:45

Belgium	7–1	Scotland
Luypaert 5', 32', 51'; Cobbaert 14', 19'; Hendrickx 43'; Pérez 68'	Report	Irvine 9'

Umpires:
Marcus Powell (WAL)
Grant Hundley (USA)

=== Classification round ===
==== Fifth to eighth place classification ====
===== Pool C =====
Pos	Team	Pld	W	D	L	GF	GA	GD	Pts	Relegation
1	England	3	2	1	0	13	5	+8	7	
2	Spain	3	2	1	0	14	8	+6	7	
3	Scotland	3	1	0	2	5	9	−4	3	Relegated to 2014 EuroHockey Junior Championship II
4	Wales	3	0	0	3	3	13	−10	0	Relegated to 2014 EuroHockey Junior Championship II

Source: EuroHockey
Rules for classification: 1) points; 2) goal difference; 3) goals scored; 4) head-to-head result.

31 August 2012
13:00

Wales	0–3	Scotland
	Report	Forsyth 8', 52'; Imrie 35'

Umpires:
Michiel Otten (NED)
Nicholas Bennett (ENG)

31 August 2012
13:30

England	4–4	Spain
Bull 36'; Roper 48'; Jackson 58'; Flanagan 65'	Report	Malgosa 15'; Dávila 22', 41'; Iglesias 50'

Umpires:
Ian Diamond (SCO)
Nicolas Marchant (BEL)

1 September 2012
09:00

Wales	2–6	Spain
Shipperley 17'; Shaw 38'	Report	De Frutos 6', 64'; Beltrán 35', 44'; Malgosa 51'; Álvarez 60'

Umpires:
Ben Göntgen (GER)
Nicolas Marchant (BEL)

1 September 2012
10:30

England	5–0	Scotland
Gilham-Jones 9', 13', 56'; Bull 59'; Roper 67'	Report

Umpires:
Marcus Powell (WAL)
Michiel Otten (NED)

==== First to fourth place classification ====
Semi-finals
31 August 2012
Netherlands	3
Germany	2
31 August 2012
Belgium (a.e.t)	3
France	2

Final
1 September 2012
Netherlands	2 (3)
Belgium (p.s.o)	2 (4)
Third Place
1 September 2012
Germany	8
France	0

===== Semi-finals =====
31 August 2012
16:00

Belgium	3–2 (a.e.t.)	France
Hendrickx 26', 74'; Pérez 41'	Report	Lockwood 18'; Lyon 58'

Umpires:
Ben Göntgen (GER)
Daniel Clarke (IRE)

31 August 2012
18:30

Netherlands	3–2	Germany
Schuurman 12'; Van Puffelen 16'; Bovendeert 44'	Report	Grambusch 19'; Rühr 41'

Umpires:
Xavier Fenaert (FRA)
Andrés Ortíz (ESP)

===== Third and fourth place =====
1 September 2012
16:00

Germany	8–0	France
Grambusch 13', 30'; Wild 18'; Swiatek 23'; Gomoll 42', 43'; Ebeling 53', 65'	Report

Umpires:
Andrés Ortíz (ESP)
Grant Hundley (USA)

===== Final =====
1 September 2012
16:30

Netherlands	2–2	Belgium
Schuurman 33'; Brinkman 50'	Report	Luypaert 20', 53'
Penalties
Leijs (penalty shoot-out scored); Schuurman (penalty shoot-out missed); Galema (penalty shoot-out scored); Bovendeert (penalty shoot-out scored); Van der Kamp (penalty shoot-out missed)	3–4	(penalty shoot-out scored) Cosyns; (penalty shoot-out scored) Plennevaux; (penalty shoot-out scored) Luypaert; (penalty shoot-out scored) Van Doren

Umpires:
Daniel Clarke (IRE)
Xavier Fenaert (FRA)

== Awards ==
Player of the Tournament	Top Goalscorer	Goalkeeper of the Tournament
(Netherlands) Glenn Schuurman	(Belgium) Loïck Luypaert	(Belgium) Arnaud Flamand

== Statistics ==
=== Final standings ===
As per statistical convention in field hockey, matches decided in extra time are counted as wins and losses, while matches decided by penalty shoot-outs are counted as draws.

Pos	Team	Pld	W	D	L	GF	GA	GD	Pts	Qualification
1st place, gold medalist(s)	Belgium	5	3	2	0	18	7	+11	11	Qualified to 2013 FIH Junior World Cup
2nd place, silver medalist(s)	Netherlands (H)	5	4	1	0	15	7	+8	13	Qualified to 2013 FIH Junior World Cup
3rd place, bronze medalist(s)	Germany	5	3	1	1	21	8	+13	10	Qualified to 2013 FIH Junior World Cup
4	France	5	2	0	3	12	17	−5	6	Qualified to 2013 FIH Junior World Cup
5	England	5	2	1	2	16	11	+5	7	Qualified to 2013 FIH Junior World Cup
6	Spain	5	2	1	2	16	15	+1	7	Qualified to 2013 FIH Junior World Cup
7	Scotland	5	1	0	4	7	22	−15	3	Relegated to 2014 EuroHockey Junior Championship II
8	Wales	5	0	0	5	6	24	−18	0	Relegated to 2014 EuroHockey Junior Championship II

Source: EuroHockey
(H) Hosts

=== Goalscorers ===
There were 111 goals scored in 20 matches, for an average of 5.55 goals per match.

7 goals

- (Belgium) Loïck Luypaert

5 goals

- (Germany) Mats Grambusch
- (Netherlands) Glenn Schuurman

4 goals

- (Belgium) Alexander Hendrickx
- (England) Ross Gilham-Jones
- (France) Hugo Genestet
- (Spain) Alejandro de Frutos

3 goals

- (England) Andrew Bull
- (France) Simon Martin-Brisac
- (Germany) Anton Ebeling
- (Germany) Benedikt Swiatek
- (Netherlands) Thierry Brinkman
- (Spain) Albert Beltrán

2 goals

- (Belgium) Matthew Cobbaert
- (Belgium) Gaetan Pérez
- (England) David Condon
- (England) Peter Jackson
- (England) Phil Roper
- (France) Gaspard Baumgarten
- (Germany) Jonas Gomoll
- (Germany) Christopher Rühr
- (Netherlands) Roel Bovandeert
- (Netherlands) Thomas Hiebendaal
- (Scotland) Alan Forsyth
- (Spain) Álex Dávila
- (Spain) Jan Malgosa
- (Wales) Rupert Shipperley

1 goal

- (Belgium) Tanguy Cosyns
- (Belgium) Maximilien Peeters
- (Belgium) Maxime Plennevaux
- (England) Dominic Bowden
- (England) George Farrant
- (England) David Flanagan
- (France) Jean-Laurent Kieffer
- (France) Viktor Lockwood
- (France) Romain Lyon
- (Germany) Max Bädelt
- (Germany) Dan Nguyen
- (Germany) Jan Nitschke
- (Germany) Niklas Wellen
- (Germany) Félix Wild
- (Germany) Lukas Windfeder
- (Netherlands) Jelle Galema
- (Netherlands) Nicki Leijs
- (Netherlands) Diede van Puffelen
- (Scotland) Michael Bremmer
- (Scotland) Christopher Duncan
- (Scotland) Hamish Imrie
- (Scotland) Alasdair Irvine
- (Scotland) Scott Lindsay
- (Spain) David Álvarez
- (Spain) Marc Boltó
- (Spain) Álvaro Iglesias
- (Spain) Lluís Mercadé
- (Spain) Antón Parente
- (Wales) Rhys Gowman
- (Wales) Ali Hassan
- (Wales) Matthew Pacey
- (Wales) Michael Shaw
