= 2027 Men's EuroHockey Indoor Club Cup =

Tournament details
- Host country: Austria
- City: Vienna
- Dates: 12–14 February
- Teams: 8 (from 8 associations)
- Venue: Sport Arena Wien

The 2027 Men's EuroHockey Indoor Club Cup will be the 36th edition of the Men's EuroHockey Indoor Club Cup, Europe's premier indoor hockey club tournament for men, organized by the European Hockey Federation. It will be held alongside the women's tournament at the Sport Arena Wien in Vienna, Austria from 12 to 14 February 2027.

== Teams ==
The participating clubs have qualified by virtue of winning their national indoor 2025–26 season and for their respective divisions based on their countries' final rankings from the 2026 competition. Czechia and Switzerland were relegated and were replaced by Austria and Ukraine, who were promoted from the 2026 EuroHockey Indoor Club Trophy.

- (Austria) AHTC Wien
- (Spain) Complutense
- (Netherlands) HDM
- (Belgium) Léopold
- (Ukraine) OKS Vinnitsa
- (England) Old Georgians
- (Germany) UHC Hamburg
- (Croatia) Zelina

== Preliminary round ==
=== Pool A ===
Pos	Team	Pld	W	D	L	GF	GA	GD	Pts	Qualification
1	(Netherlands) HDM	0	0	0	0	0	0	0	0	Semi-finals
2	(Croatia) Zelina	0	0	0	0	0	0	0	0	Semi-finals
3	(Ukraine) OKS Vinnitsa	0	0	0	0	0	0	0	0	
4	(Belgium) Léopold	0	0	0	0	0	0	0	0	

First match(es) will be played: 12 February 2027. Source: EHF
Rules for classification: 1) points; 2) matches won; 3) goal difference; 4) goals for; 5) head-to-head result; 6) field goals for.

12 February 2027
13:30

Léopold (Belgium)	v	(Ukraine) OKS Vinnitsa
	Report

12 February 2027
14:20

HDM (Netherlands)	v	(Croatia) Zelina
	Report

12 February 2027
20:10

Zelina (Croatia)	v	(Ukraine) OKS Vinnitsa
	Report

12 February 2027
21:00

Léopold (Belgium)	v	(Netherlands) HDM
	Report

13 February 2027
13:30

HDM (Netherlands)	v	(Ukraine) OKS Vinnitsa
	Report

13 February 2027
14:20

Zelina (Croatia)	v	(Belgium) Léopold
	Report

=== Pool B ===
Pos	Team	Pld	W	D	L	GF	GA	GD	Pts	Qualification
1	(Austria) AHTC Wien (H)	0	0	0	0	0	0	0	0	Semi-finals
2	(England) Old Georgians	0	0	0	0	0	0	0	0	Semi-finals
3	(Spain) Complutense	0	0	0	0	0	0	0	0	
4	(Germany) UHC Hamburg	0	0	0	0	0	0	0	0	

Source: EHF
Rules for classification: 1) points; 2) matches won; 3) goal difference; 4) goals for; 5) head-to-head result; 6) field goals for.
(H) Hosts

12 February 2027
10:10

UHC Hamburg (Germany)	v	(England) Old Georgians
	Report

12 February 2027
11:00

Complutense (Spain)	v	(Austria) AHTC Wien
	Report

12 February 2027
16:50

Complutense (Spain)	v	(Germany) UHC Hamburg
	Report

12 February 2027
17:40

Old Georgians (England)	v	(Austria) AHTC Wien
	Report

13 February 2027
11:50

Old Georgians (England)	v	(Spain) Complutense
	Report

13 February 2027
12:40

UHC Hamburg (Germany)	v	(Austria) AHTC Wien
	Report

== Fifth to eighth place classification ==
The points obtained in the preliminary round against the other team were carried over.

=== Pool C ===
Pos	Team	Pld	W	D	L	GF	GA	GD	Pts	Relegation
5	3rd Pool A	0	0	0	0	0	0	0	0	
6	3rd Pool B	0	0	0	0	0	0	0	0	
7	4th Pool A	0	0	0	0	0	0	0	0	EuroHockey Indoor Club Trophy
8	4th Pool B	0	0	0	0	0	0	0	0	EuroHockey Indoor Club Trophy

Source: EHF
Rules for classification: 1) points; 2) matches won; 3) goal difference; 4) goals for; 5) head-to-head result; 6) field goals for.

13 February 2027
18:30

4th Pool A	v	4th Pool B
	Report

13 February 2027
20:10

3rd Pool A	v	3rd Pool B
	Report

14 February 2027
11:00

3rd Pool A	v	4th Pool B
	Report

14 February 2027
12:15

3rd Pool B	v	4th Pool A
	Report

== First to fourth place classification ==
=== Bracket ===
Semi-finals
13 February
1st Pool A
2nd Pool B
13 February
1st Pool B
2nd Pool A

Final
14 February
Third place
14 February

=== Semi-finals ===
13 February 2027
19:20

1st Pool A	M14	2nd Pool B
	Report

13 February 2027
21:00

1st Pool B	M16	2nd Pool A
	Report

=== Third and fourth place ===
14 February 2027
15:00

Loser M14	v	Loser M16
	Report

=== Final ===
14 February 2027
17:40

Winner M14	v	Winner M16
	Report

== See also ==
- 2026–27 Men's Euro Hockey League
