= Gaziantep Polisgücü SK =

Turkish sports club

- Purpose: Sport: football, field hockey, handball, shooting sport
- Headquarters: Yaprak Mah.
- Location: Şehitkamil, Gaziantep, Turkey
- General Secretary: Club Manager Celal Akarçay (2003- present )

Active departments of Gaziantep Polisgücü SK
Football	Handball
Hockey (M, W)	Shooting

Gaziantep Polisgücü SK (Turkish: Gaziantep Polisgücü Spor Kulübü Derneği) is a Turkish multi-sport club based in Gaziantep. It is sponsored by the Gaziantep Police Directoriate. The club consists of four branches, namely football, handball, field hockey and shooting sport. Since 2013, the club's chairman is Mehmet Kaplan.

Gaziantep Polisgücü SK was established on 29 November 1988, with the aim to promote good relations between society and law enforcement, as well as deter street children and at-risk children in the rural area from crime and bad habits. As of May 2012, the club had around 300 members. The club offers summer camp courses on sport branches such as field hockey, football, karate, taekwondo and judo for around 250 children from low-income families.

The club's football department plays in the amateur league while the hockey team is successful in the Turkish Field and Indoor Hockey Super Leagues. In 2008, the hockey team achieved third place at the Eurohockey Men’s Club Champions Challenge IV. In May 2013, the hockey team won the 2013 Eurohockey Men’s Club Champions Challenge III in Slovakia and was promoted to one higher division for the next year's competition. 34 players of the hockey team, which currently has ten Turkish champion titles, were admitted to the Turkey national teams. Two members of the shooting sport squad are Turkish champions in the air pistol event, and three members compete in the national team.
