= Dan Nguyen =

German field hockey player

Dan Nguyen Luong
Personal information
- Born: Dan Nguyen Luong; 8 December 1991 (age 34)

Sport
- Sport: Field hockey
- Position: Midfielder
- Club: Mannheimer HC
Senior career
Years	Team	Caps	Goals
2010–2014	Mannheimer HC	-	-
2014–2015	Club an der Alster	-	-
2015–present	Mannheimer HC	-	-
National team
Years	Team	Caps	Goals
2010–present	Germany (indoor)	13	(1)
2014–present	Germany	67	(4)
Medal record
Representing Germany
Men's field hockey
Champions Trophy
Gold medal – first place	2014 Bhubaneswar
EuroHockey Junior Championship
Bronze medal – third place	2010 Siemianowice Śląski
Bronze medal – third place	2012 's-Hertogenbosch
Men's indoor hockey
Indoor Hockey World Cup
Silver medal – second place	2018 Berlin

Dan Nguyen Luong (born 8 December 1991) is a German field hockey player who plays as a midfielder for Mannheimer HC and the German national team.

== International career ==
Nguyen made his debut for the national team in January 2014. In November 2018, he was selected in the Germany squad for the 2018 World Cup. He also represented Germany at the 2019 European Championship.
