= 2022 Women's EuroHockey Indoor Club Cup =

Cancelled indoor hockey tournament

Tournament details
- Host country: Netherlands
- City: Almere
- Dates: Cancelled
- Teams: 8 (from 8 associations)
- Venue(s): Topsportcentrum

The 2021 Women's EuroHockey Indoor Club Cup was scheduled to be the 32nd edition of the Women's EuroHockey Indoor Club Cup, Europe's premier women's club indoor hockey tournament organized by the European Hockey Federation. It was scheduled to be held at the Topsportcentrum in Almere, Netherlands from 11 to 13 February 2022. On 17 January 2022 it was announced the tournament was cancelled due to the COVID-19 pandemic for the second year in a row.

== Teams ==
Participating clubs qualified based on their country's final rankings from the 2020 competition. The champions from the top six countries from last year's edition together with the top two from the 2020 EuroHockey Indoor Club Trophy were qualified. Belgium and Switzerland were the two promoted countries that replaced Austria and England.

Pool A	Pool B
(Germany) Club an der Alster	(Netherlands) Laren
(Belarus) Minsk	(Ukraine) Sumchanka
(Russia) Dinamo Elektrostal	(Spain) Complutense
(Switzerland) Rotweiss Wettingen	(Belgium) Waterloo Ducks

== See also ==
- 2022 Euro Hockey League Women
- 2022 Men's EuroHockey Indoor Club Cup
