= 2023 Women's EuroHockey Indoor Club Cup =

Cancelled indoor hockey tournament

Tournament details
- Host country: Turkey
- City: Alanya
- Dates: Cancelled
- Teams: 7 (from 7 associations)
- Venue: Alanya Atatürk Spor Salonu

The 2023 Women's EuroHockey Indoor Club Cup was scheduled to be the 32nd edition of the Women's EuroHockey Indoor Club Cup, Europe's premier women's club indoor hockey tournament organized by the European Hockey Federation. It was scheduled to be held at the Alanya Atatürk Spor Salonu in Alanya, Turkey from 24 to 26 February 2023. On 13 February 2023, it was announced the tournament was cancelled due to the impact of the 2023 Turkey–Syria earthquake.

== Qualified teams ==
Participating clubs qualified based on their country's final rankings from the 2022 competition. Teams from Belarus and Russia were excluded from the tournament due to their involvement in the 2022 Russian invasion of Ukraine. Den Bosch withdrew from the tournament due to a scheduling conflict with their outdoor programme.

- (Germany) Düsseldorfer HC
- (Ukraine) Sumchanka
- (Spain) Club de Campo
- (Belgium) Royal Racing Club Bruxelles
- (Switzerland) Rotweiss Wettingen
- (Turkey) Gaziantep Doruk
- (Czech Republic) Slavia Prague

== See also ==
- 2023 Men's EuroHockey Indoor Club Cup
- 2023 Women's Euro Hockey League
