= 2027 Women's EuroHockey Indoor Club Cup =

Tournament details
- Host country: Austria
- City: Vienna
- Dates: 12–14 February
- Teams: 8 (from 8 associations)
- Venue: Sport Arena Wien

The 2027 Women's EuroHockey Indoor Club Cup will be the 35th edition of the Women's EuroHockey Indoor Club Cup, Europe's premier indoor hockey club tournament for women, organized by the European Hockey Federation. It will be held alongside the men's tournament at the Sport Arena Wien in Vienna, Austria, from 12 to 14 February 2027.

== Teams ==
The participating clubs have qualified by virtue of winning their national indoor 2025–26 season and for their respective divisions based on their countries' final rankings from the 2026 competition. Spain and Poland were relegated and were replaced by Austria and France, who were promoted from the 2026 EuroHockey Indoor Club Trophy.

- (Austria) AHTC Wien
- (France) CAM 92
- (Germany) Düsseldorfer HC
- (England) East Grinstead
- (Netherlands) SCHC
- (Czech Republic) Slavia Prague
- (Ukraine) Sumchanka
- (Belgium) Waterloo Ducks
