= Zalasewo =

- Village
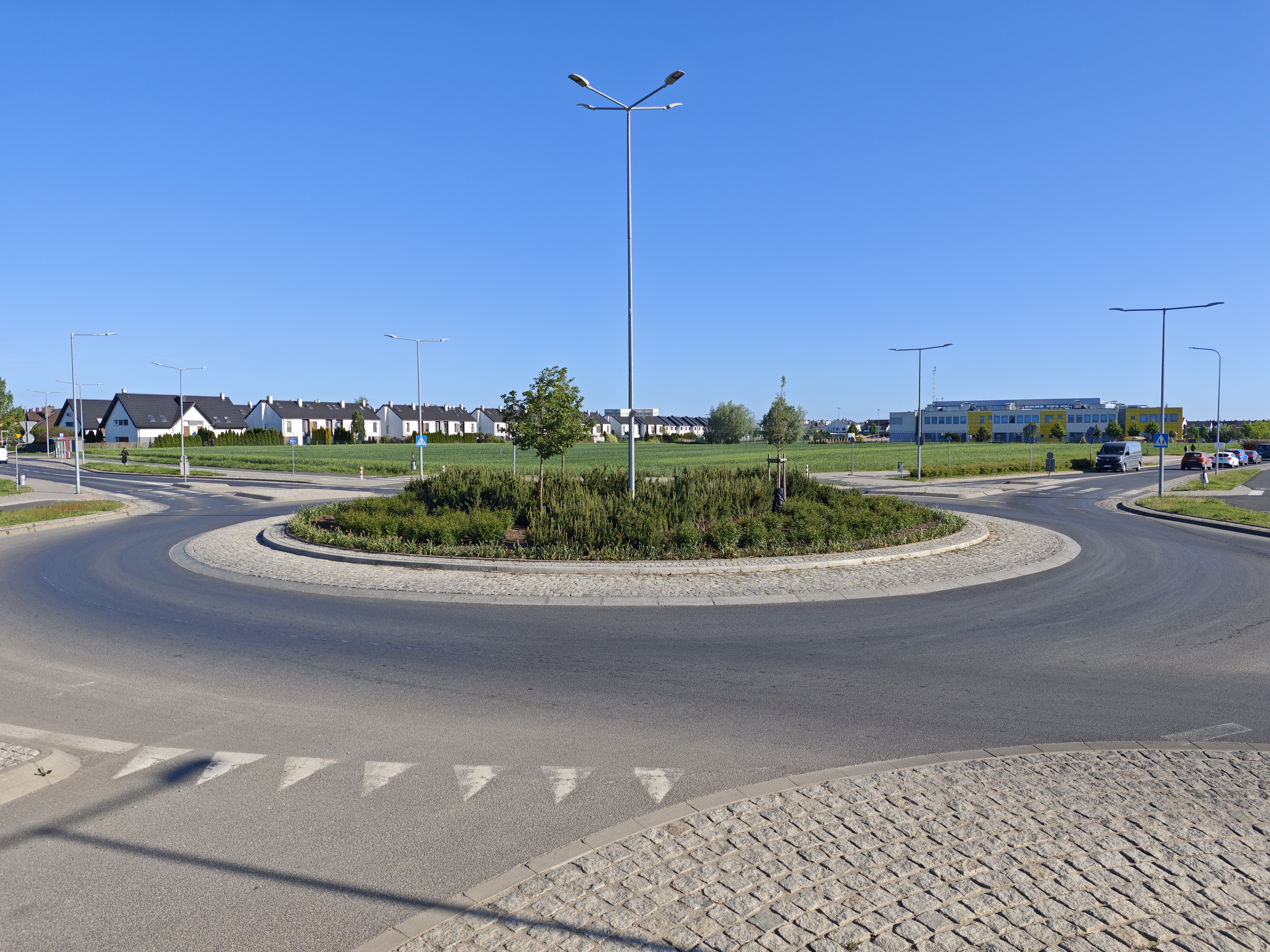

- Location within Poland
- Coordinates: 52°23′N 17°5′E
- Country: Poland
- Voivodeship: Greater Poland
- County: Poznań
- Gmina: Swarzędz

Population
  - Total: 7,062 (2,023)
- Time zone: UTC+1 (CET)
  - Summer (DST): UTC+2 (CEST)

Zalasewo [zalaˈsɛvɔ] is a village in the administrative district of Gmina Swarzędz, within Poznań County, Greater Poland Voivodeship, in west-central Poland. It is part of the Poznań metropolitan area.
