= 1975 EuroHockey Club Champions Cup =

The 1975 EuroHockey Club Champions Cup was the second official edition of Europe's premier field hockey club competition. It took place in Frankfurt, where it was won once again by hosts SC 1880 Frankfurt - the last of five titles in a row.

== Standings ==
1. (West Germany) SC 1880 Frankfurt
2. (Belgium) Royal Léopold Club
3. (England) Southgate HC
4. (Netherlands) SV Kampong
5. (West Germany) Rot-Weiss Köln
6. (Spain) Club Egara
7. (Scotland) Edinburgh HC
8. (Socialist Federal Republic of Yugoslavia) HK Suboticanka
9. (Switzerland) Rot-Weiss Wettingen
10. (Czechoslovakia) Bohemians Prague
11. (France) Lyon
12. (Austria) Wien
