= Benjamin Carless =

Welsh field hockey player

Ben Carless
Personal information
- Born: 17 December 1990 (age 35) Shrewsbury, England

Sport
- Sport: Field hockey
- Position: Defender
Senior career
Years	Team	Caps	Goals
2007–2013	Stourport	-	-
2013–2015	Team Bath	-	-
2015–2019	Cardiff & Met	-	-
2024–2025	Wotton-under-Edge	-	-
National team
Years	Team	Caps	Goals
2008–2017	Wales		-

Benjamin David Carless (born 17 December 1990) is a field hockey player who represented Wales. He competed for Wales at the 2014 Commonwealth Games.

== Biography ==
Carless, born in Shrewsbury, was educated at Wistanstow Primary School and Church Stretton School and studied Mechanical Engineering at the University of Bath.

After playing in the Welsh national age groups of U16 to U21, he joined the senior Welsh national set up in 2008. He played club hockey for Stourport Hockey Club in the Men's England Hockey League before university and then played club hockey for Team Bath. He was selected to represent the Welsh team at the 2014 Commonwealth Games in Glasgow, Scotland in the men's tournament.

After university Carless joined the Dyson company and signed for Cardiff & Met Hockey Club. He played for Wotton-under-Edge Hockey Club in 2024/25.
