= Women's EuroHockey Indoor Club Cup =

Annual indoor hockey club competition organised by the EHF

- Current season, competition or edition: 2027 Women's EuroHockey Indoor Club Cup
- Formerly: Women's EuroHockey Club Champions Cup
- Sport: Indoor hockey
- Founded: 1990; 36 years ago
- First season: 1990
- No. of teams: 8
- Confederation: EHF (Europe)
- Most recent champion: (Belgium) Waterloo Ducks (1st title) (2026)
- Most titles: (Germany) Rüsselsheimer RK (15 titles)
- Level on pyramid: 1
- Relegation to: EuroHockey Indoor Club Trophy

The Women's EuroHockey Indoor Club Cup is an annual indoor hockey club competition organised by the EHF. It is the premier club tournament of Europe for indoor hockey and contested by the women's champions of the eight strongest EHF national associations.

German clubs have the highest number of victories (30 wins), two editions have been won by a Dutch club and Ukrainian and Belgian clubs have one victory. 13 clubs have won the competition, five of which have won it more than once, and three successfully defended their title. Rüsselsheimer RK is the most successful club in the tournament's history, having won it 15 times, including 13 consecutive titles from 1994 to 2006. Waterloo Ducks are the current European champions, having beaten Den Bosch in the 2026 final 2–1 in a shoot-out for their first title and the first title for a Belgian club.

== Format ==
A total of eight teams competes in the EuroHockey Indoor Club Cup, the champions of those nations ranked one to six in the previous year's Cup and the champions of those 2 nations promoted from the previous year's Trophy, the second level.

The eight teams are divided into two groups and play each other once. If a game is won, the winning team receives 5 points. A draw results in both teams receiving 2 points. A loss gives the losing team 1 point unless the losing team lost by 3 or more goals, then they receive 0 points. The top two teams advance to the semi-finals and the bottom two teams will be placed in pool C, the relegation pool. Each team in Pool C will carry forward the result of the match against that other team in their original pool (A or B) who also goes forward with them into Pool C. Each team will play the other 2 teams in Pool C once. The bottom two teams in pool C are relegated.

== Summaries ==
Year	Host	Final			Third place match			Number of teams
Year	Host	Winner	Score	Runner-up	Third place	Score	Fourth place	Number of teams
1990; Details	Groningen, Netherlands	(West Germany); SC Brandenburg	4–3	(England); Slough	(Netherlands); Groningen	5–2	(Scotland); Glasgow Western	12
1991; Details	Amiens, France	(Germany); Rüsselsheimer RK	5–2	(England); Ipswich	(Scotland); Glasgow Western		(France); Amiens	8
1992; Details	Rüsselsheim am Main, Germany	(Germany); Rüsselsheimer RK	8–3	(Spain); Atlético Madrid	(Scotland); Glasgow Western		(Netherlands); Groningen	8
1993; Details	Berlin, Germany	(Germany); Berliner HC	6–3	(Germany); Rüsselsheimer RK	(England); Hightown		(Scotland); Glasgow Western	8
1994; Details	Rüsselsheim am Main, Germany	(Germany); Rüsselsheimer RK	6–5	(Germany); Berliner HC	(Scotland); Edinburgh		(England); Hightown	8
1995; Details	Rüsselsheim am Main, Germany	(Germany); Rüsselsheimer RK	7–1	(England); Slough	(Spain); Valdeluz		(Lithuania); Eurovil	8
1996; Details	Bratislava, Slovakia	(Germany); Rüsselsheimer RK	7–4	(Germany); Berliner HC	(England); Hightown		(Spain); Valdeluz	8
1997; Details	Amiens, France	(Germany); Rüsselsheimer RK	7–6	(Germany); Berliner HC	(Spain); Club de Campo		(England); Slough	8
1998; Details	Rüsselsheim am Main, Germany	(Germany); Rüsselsheimer RK	7–4	(Germany); Eintracht Frankfurt	(Spain); Club de Campo		(England); Slough	8
1999; Details	Glasgow, Scotland	(Germany); Rüsselsheimer RK	7–1	(England); Slough	(Spain); Real Sociedad		(Lithuania); Siauliai	8
2000; Details	Cambrai, France	(Germany); Rüsselsheimer RK	Round-robin	(Germany); Klipper THC	(Belarus); Grodno	Round-robin	(Lithuania); Siauliai	7
2001; Details	Angers, France	(Germany); Rüsselsheimer RK	8–8 (a.e.t.) (3–1 p.s.)	(Germany); Berliner HC	(Scotland); Glasgow Western		(Lithuania); Siauliai	8
2002; Details	Hamburg, Germany	(Germany); Rüsselsheimer RK	4–4 (a.e.t.) (2–1 p.s.)	(Germany); Klipper THC	(Belarus); Grodno		(Netherlands); Rotterdam	8
2003; Details	Cambrai, France	(Germany); Rüsselsheimer RK	3–1	(Belarus); Grodno	(Netherlands); Den Bosch		(England); Slough	8
2004; Details	Rüsselsheim am Main, Germany	(Germany); Rüsselsheimer RK	3–1	(Belarus); Grodno	(Austria); Vienna Neudorf		(Lithuania); Siauiai Gintra	8
2005; Details	Prague, Czech Republic	(Germany); Rüsselsheimer RK	2–0	(Belarus); Grodno	(Netherlands); HGC		(France); Cambrai	8
2006; Details	Sant Cugat del Vallès, Spain	(Germany); Rüsselsheimer RK	2–2 (a.e.t.) (3–2 p.s.)	(Belarus); Grodno	(France); Cambrai		(Spain); Junior	8
2007; Details	Hamburg, Germany	(Germany); Club an der Alster	3–2 (g.g.)	(Belarus); Grodno	(Netherlands); Kampong		(Lithuania); HFTC	8
2008; Details	Prague, Czech Republic	(Germany); Harvestehuder THC	6–0	(Spain); Club de Campo	(Belarus); Grodno		(Ukraine); Sumchanka	8
2009; Details	Madrid, Spain	(Germany); Club an der Alster	7–5	(Ukraine); Sumchanka	(Netherlands); Laren		(Spain); Club de Campo	8
2010; Details	Sumy, Ukraine	(Germany); Club an der Alster	2–0	(Spain); Club de Campo	(Netherlands); Kampong		(Ukraine); Sumchanka	8
2011; Details	Mannheim, Germany	(Germany); TSV Mannheim	3–2	(Belarus); Victorya Smolevichi	(Netherlands); Kampong		(Lithuania); Gintra Streke UNI HC	8
2012; Details	Vienna, Austria	(Germany); Berliner HC	4–4 (a.e.t.) (6–5 p.s.)	(Belarus); Grodno	(Netherlands); Kampong		(Spain); Club de Campo	8
2013; Details	Vienna, Austria	(Netherlands); Den Bosch	3–2	(Spain); Club de Campo	(Germany); Rot-Weiss Köln		(Czech Republic); Slavia Prague	8
2014; Details	Cambrai, France	(Germany); Berliner HC	3–2	(Spain); Club de Campo	(Czech Republic); Slavia Prague		(Netherlands); Amsterdam	8
2015; Details	Šiauliai, Lithuania	(Germany); UHC Hamburg	8–0	(Spain); Club de Campo	(Ukraine); Sumchanka	4–4 (2–1 s.o.)	(Czech Republic); Slavia Prague	8
2016; Details	Minsk, Belarus	(Germany); Düsseldorfer HC	2–0	(Spain); Club de Campo	(Czech Republic); Slavia Prague	2–0	(Austria); Arminen	8
2017; Details	Wettingen, Switzerland	(Germany); Mannheimer HC	5–3	(Belarus); Minsk	(Switzerland); Rotweiss Wettingen	3–2	(Spain); Club de Campo	8
2018; Details	Dundee, Scotland	(Germany); UHC Hamburg	6–2	(Spain); Club de Campo	(Netherlands); Amsterdam	1–1 (2–1 s.o.)	(Ukraine); Sumchanka	8
2019; Details	Hamburg, Germany	(Netherlands); Laren	3–1	(Russia); Dinamo Elektrostal	(Germany); Club an der Alster	7–0	(Spain); Club de Campo	8
2020; Details	The Hague, Netherlands	(Germany); Düsseldorfer HC	4–2	(Netherlands); HDM	(Ukraine); Sumchanka	6–5	(Belarus); Minsk	8
2021; Details	Almere, Netherlands	Cancelled due to the COVID-19 pandemic.						8
2022; Details	Almere, Netherlands	Cancelled due to the COVID-19 pandemic.						8
2023; Details	Alanya, Turkey	Cancelled due to the 2023 Turkey–Syria earthquake.						7
2024; Details	Alanya, Turkey	(Germany); Düsseldorfer HC	11–3	(Turkey); Gaziantep	(Ukraine); Sumchanka	4–1	(Belgium); Racing Club de Bruxelles	10
2025; Details	Šiauliai, Lithuania	(Ukraine); Sumchanka	2–2 (2–0 s.o.)	(Netherlands); SCHC	(Spain); Complutense	3–3 (3–2 s.o.)	(Germany); Mannheimer HC	8
2026; Details	Swarzędz, Poland	(Belgium); Waterloo Ducks	2–2 (2–1 s.o.)	(Netherlands); Den Bosch	(England); East Grinstead	6–2	(Germany); Mannheimer HC	8
2027; Details	Vienna, Austria							8

== Records and statistics ==
=== Performances by club ===
Medal table by club
Rank	Club	Gold	Silver	Bronze	Total
1	(Germany) Rüsselsheimer RK	15	1	0	16
2	(Germany) Berliner HC	3	4	0	7
3	(Germany) Club an der Alster	3	0	1	4
4	(Germany) Düsseldorfer HC	3	0	0	3
5	(Germany) UHC Hamburg	2	0	0	2
6	(Ukraine) Sumchanka	1	1	3	5
7	(Netherlands) Den Bosch	1	1	1	3
8	(Netherlands) Laren	1	0	1	2
9	(Germany) Harvestehuder THC	1	0	0	1
9	(Germany) Mannheimer HC	1	0	0	1
9	(Germany) SC Brandenburg	1	0	0	1
9	(Germany) TSV Mannheim	1	0	0	1
9	(Belgium) Waterloo Ducks	1	0	0	1
14	(Spain) Club de Campo	0	7	2	9
15	(Belarus) Grodno	0	6	3	9
16	(England) Slough	0	3	0	3
17	(Germany) Klipper THC	0	2	0	2
18	(Spain) Atlético Madrid	0	1	0	1
18	(Russia) Dinamo Elektrostal	0	1	0	1
18	(Germany) Eintracht Frankfurt	0	1	0	1
21–41	Remaining	0	6	23	29
Totals (41 entries)		34	34	34	102

=== Performances by nation ===
Medal table by nation
Rank	Nation	Gold	Silver	Bronze	Total
1	Germany (Note: Includes results from West German clubs in 1990)	30	8	2	40
2	Netherlands	2	3	9	14
3	Ukraine	1	1	3	5
4	Belgium	1	0	0	1
5	Spain	0	8	5	13
6	Belarus	0	8	3	11
7	England	0	4	3	7
8	Russia	0	1	0	1
8	Turkey	0	1	0	1
10	Scotland	0	0	4	4
11	Czech Republic	0	0	2	2
12	Austria	0	0	1	1
12	France	0	0	1	1
12	Switzerland	0	0	1	1
Totals (14 entries)		34	34	34	102

== See also ==
- Men's EuroHockey Indoor Club Cup
- EuroHockey Club Champions Cup (women)
- Women's EuroHockey Indoor Championship
- Women's Euro Hockey League
