= Jan-Philipp Rabente =

German field hockey player

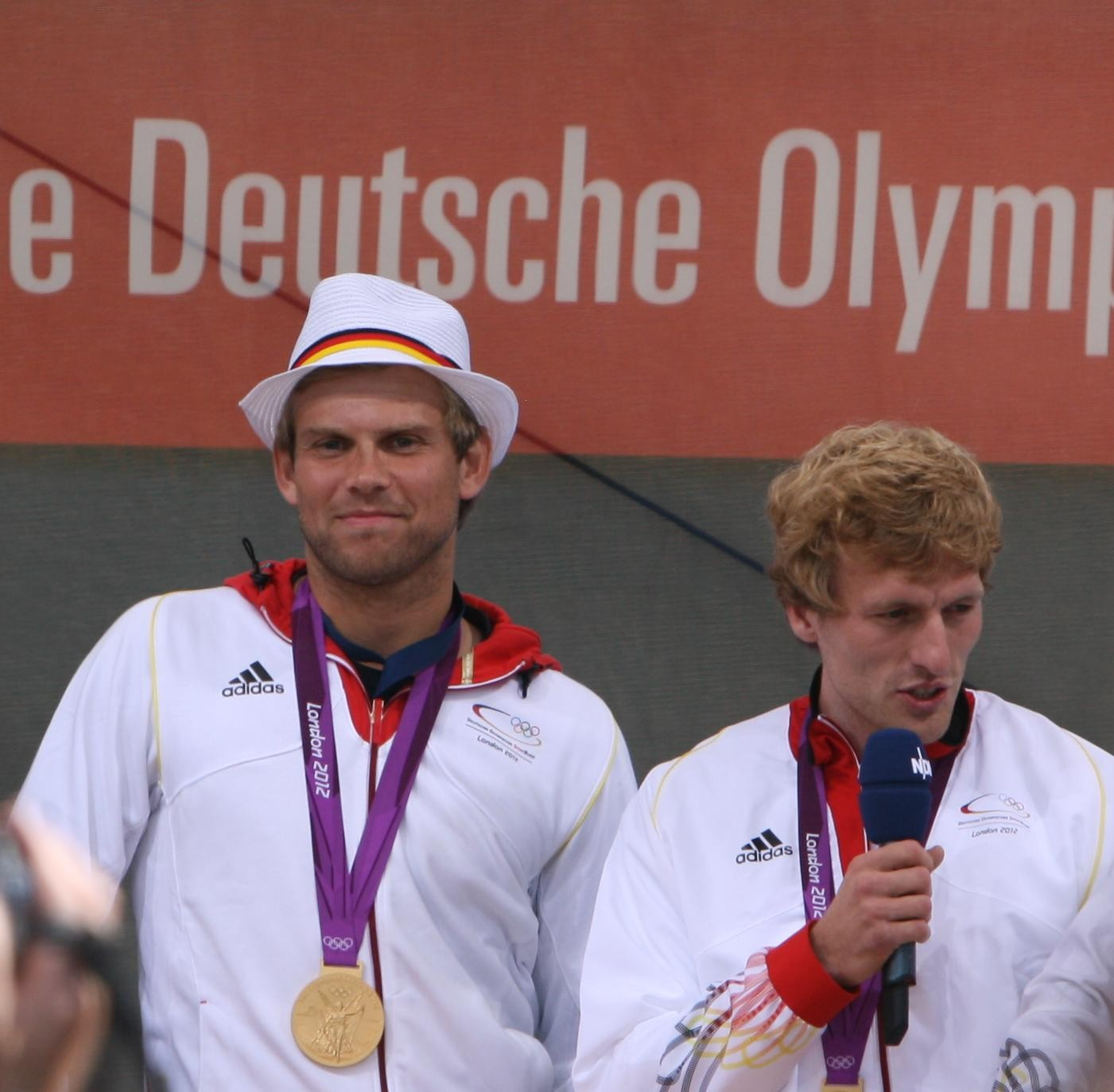
- Rabente (right) and Moritz Fürste during a TV interview after winning Olympic Gold in 2012.

Personal information
- Born: 3 July 1987 (age 39) Essen, West Germany

Sport
- Sport: Field hockey
- Position: Defender / Midfielder
- Club: UHC Hamburg
Youth career
- Team
- –: Uhlenhorst Mülheim
Senior career
Years	Team	Caps	Goals
–	Uhlenhorst Mülheim	-	-
2013–present	UHC Hamburg	-	-
National team
Years	Team	Caps	Goals
2008–present	Germany	163	(10)
2020–present	Germany (indoor)	5	(0)
Medal record
Representing Germany
Men's field hockey
Olympic Games
Gold medal – first place	2012 London	Team
World Cup
Silver medal – second place	2010 New Delhi
EuroHockey Championship
Gold medal – first place	2013 Boom
Silver medal – second place	2009 Amstelveen
Champions Trophy
Silver medal – second place	2009 Melbourne
Bronze medal – third place	2016 London
Men's indoor hockey
EuroHockey Indoor Championship
Gold medal – first place	2020 Berlin
- Updated on 21 January 2020

Jan-Philipp Rabente (born 3 July 1987) is a German field hockey player who plays as a defender or midfielder for UHC Hamburg and the German national team.

At the 2012 Summer Olympics, he competed for the national team in the men's tournament. In January 2020, he won the European Indoor Championship with the national indoor hockey team by defeating Austria in the final.
