= AZS AWF Poznań =

AZS AWF Poznań is a sports club located in the Polish city of Poznań which has a long and distinguished history of promoting physical activity and healthy lifestyles. Founded in 1948, the club has become a focal point for sports enthusiasts, students, and athletes in the region. The name "AZS" stands for "Academic Sports Association," while "AWF" refers to the Academy of Physical Education in Poznań, the university that founded the club. The women's volleyball team played in the Polish Seria A Women's Volleyball League. However, on 6 April 2009, the club sold its license to play in the second league club and now operates as KS Piecobiogaz Murowana Goślina. (It was non-existent for 2009/2010 season interregnum). The club also has a field hockey section.

== 2003/2004 season ==
8th place in Seria A.

== 2004/2005 season ==
The team will play Seria A.

== See also ==
- Volleyball in Poland
- Sports in Poland
