= Mannheimer HC =

German sports club

- Full name: Mannheimer Hockeyclub 1907 e.V.
- Short name: MHC
- League: Men's Bundesliga; Women's Bundesliga
- Founded: 18 February 1907; 119 years ago
- Website: Club website
Home	Away	Third

Mannheimer Hockeyclub 1907 e.V., also known as Mannheimer HC, is a German professional sports club based in Mannheim, Baden-Württemberg. It is best known for its field hockey department but it also has tennis and indoor hockey sections.

Both the men's and women's first team play in the Bundesliga the highest tier of German field hockey for men and women.

== Honours ==
=== Men ===
Bundesliga

- Winners (1): 2016–17, 2023–24
- Runners-up (2): 2018–19, 2022–23

Indoor Bundesliga

- Winners (3): 2009–10, 2021–22, 2023–24
- Runners-up (2): 2016–17, 2025–26

EuroHockey Indoor Club Cup

- Winners (1): 2011
- Runners-up (1): 2025

EuroHockey Indoor Club Trophy

- Winners (1): 2023

=== Women ===
Bundesliga

- Winners (1): 2022–23
- Runners-up (4): 2016–17, 2019–2021, 2021–22, 2023–24

Euro Hockey League

- Runners-up (1): 2024

Indoor Bundesliga

- Winners (3): 2015–16, 2023–24, 2024–25
- Runners-up (1): 2021–22

EuroHockey Indoor Club Cup

- Winners (1): 2017

== Current squad ==
=== Men's squad ===
As of 2021–22

Trainer: (Spain) Andreu Enrich

No.	Pos.	Nation	Player
2	DF	GER	Gonzalo Peillat
3	DF	GER	Christopher Held
4	GK	GER	Lukas Stumpf
5	MF	GER	Benjamin Benzinger
6	FW	GER	Raphael Hartkopf
7	MF	GER	Tin Nguyen
9	FW	GER	Luis Holste
10	DF	GER	Linus Müller
11	DF	GER	Jossip Anzeneder
12	MF	GER	Erik Kleinlein
13	FW	GER	Paul Zmyslony
14	DF	GER	Teo Hinrichs
16	MF	GER	Peer Hinrichs

No.	Pos.	Nation	Player
16	DF	GER	Philipp Löscher
17	MF	GER	Tim Seagon
18	MF	GER	Mario Schachner
20	FW	GER	Justus Weigand
22	MF	GER	Dan Nguyen
23	MF	GER	Jan-Philipp Fischer
24	MF	GER	Marius Leser
24	FW	GER	Nico Reichert
25	DF	GER	Moritz Himmler
26	FW	ARG	Guido Barreiros
27	MF	GER	Alexander Schöllkopf
28	GK	GER	Florian Simon
30	GK	GER	Jean Danneberg

=== Women's squad ===
As of 2021–22

Trainer: Nicklas Benecke

No.	Pos.	Nation	Player
1	GK	GER	Felicitas Heinzel
2	DF	ARG	Lucina von der Heyde
4	FW	GER	Nadine Kanler
5	DF	ARG	Agustina Habif
6	MF	AUT	Fiona Felber
7	DF	GER	Luise Bantow
8	DF	GER	Antonia Hendrix
9	MF	ESP	Clara Badia
10	FW	GER	Luisa Walter
12	DF	GER	Sophie Tiefenbacher
13	GK	GER	Karlotta Lammers
15	DF	GER	Paula Schröder
14	FW	GER	Aina Kresken

No.	Pos.	Nation	Player
16	DF	GER	Paulina Mayer
17	MF	GER	Lisa Mayerhöfer
18	MF	ARG	Florencia Habif
19	MF	GER	Verena Neumann
20	FW	GER	Naomi Heyn
21	GK	GER	Lisa Schneider
22	FW	GER	Merle Knobloch
24	MF	GER	Linda Bens
25	MF	GER	Paulina Niklaus
26	FW	GER	Tessa von Velsen
27	DF	GER	Stine Kurz
28	MF	GER	Charlotte Gerstenhöfer
31	FW	GER	Isabella Schmidt
