= Royal Léopold Club =

Sports club from Brussels, Belgium

Léopold
- Full name: Royal Léopold Club
- League: Men's Hockey League; Women's National 1
- Founded: 1893; 133 years ago
- Website: Club website
Home	Away

Royal Léopold Club, also known as Léopold, is a professional Belgian sports club based in Uccle, Brussels. The club is most well known for its field hockey section with both the first men's and women's teams playing in the Belgian Hockey League.

They are the most successful Belgian field hockey club having won 28 league titles. Their biggest European success was in 1975 when they reached the final of the EuroHockey Club Champions Cup. In 2021 they won their first Euro Hockey League medal and became the third Belgian club to do so when they won the bronze medal match against Uhlenhorst Mülheim. The club was founded in 1893 and the field hockey section in 1895.

== Honours ==
=== Men ===
Belgian Hockey League

- Winners (28): 1921–22, 1922–23, 1927–28, 1938–39, 1950–51, 1951–52, 1954–55, 1958–59, 1959–60, 1960–61, 1965–66, 1966–67, 1967–68, 1968–69, 1969–70, 1970–71, 1971–72, 1972–73, 1973–74, 1978–79, 1987–88, 1988–89, 1990–91, 1991–92, 2001–02, 2003–04, 2004–05, 2018–19

EuroHockey Club Champions Cup

- Runners-up (1): 1975

EuroHockey Club Trophy

- Winners: 1989

EuroHockey Indoor Club Cup

- Winners (1): 2025

EuroHockey Indoor Cub Challenge II

- Runners-up (1): 2005

=== Women ===
Belgian Hockey League

- Winners (14): 1921–22, 1922–23, 1925–26, 1929–30, 1935–36, 1936–37, 1949–50, 1950–51, 1991–91, 1994–95, 1999–00, 2000–01, 2003–04, 2004–05

== Current squad ==
=== Men's squad ===
As of 2021–22

No.	Pos.	Nation	Player
1	DF	ESP	Alfonso Moreno
2	FW	BEL	Benjamin Thiery
3	GK	BEL	Romain Henet
4	MF	BEL	Lewis Eaton
5	DF	BEL	Max Musch
6	FW	BEL	Dylan Englebert
7	FW	BEL	Arthur Verdussen
8	FW	FRA	Gaspard Baumgarten
9	DF	BEL	John Verdussen
10	MF	BEL	Dimitri Cuvelier
11	MF	BEL	Archibald De Kepper

No.	Pos.	Nation	Player
12	DF	BEL	Corentin De Trez
13	FW	BEL	Tom Degroote
14	MF	BEL	Tanguy Zimmer
16	MF	BEL	Maxime Groeteclaes
18	DF	FRA	Jean-Bapiste Forgues
19	FW	BEL	Brieuc Vanderborght
21	GK	FRA	Edgar Reynaud
27	FW	BEL	Tom Boon
29	DF	BEL	Arno Verdoodt
36	FW	BEL	Maxime Plennevaux

=== Women's squad ===
As of 2021–22

No.	Pos.	Nation	Player
1	GK	BEL	Juliette Grignard
2	DF	ARG	Rocio Brocoli
4	MF	BEL	Floriane Vilain (Captain)
5	FW	BEL	Laurine Lepoutre
7	DF	BEL	Léa Gilbert
8	MF	BEL	Laura Vilain
9	FW	BEL	Cameron Croese
10	MF	ITA	Jasbeer Singh
11	DF	BEL	Julia Kick

No.	Pos.	Nation	Player
12	MF	ARG	Delfina Merino
16	FW	BEL	Emilie Drossos
17	MF	BEL	Cassy Boey
19	FW	ARG	Agustina Albertario
22	MF	BEL	Victoria De Kepper
23	DF	ESP	Marta Zorita
24	DF	BEL	Emeline Massart
34	FW	BEL	Elisabeth Mommens
