= Mladost (sports society) =

Multi-sport club

HAŠK Mladost (Mladost, lit. "Youth") is an academic sports society from Zagreb, Croatia, sponsored by the University of Zagreb. Clubs named Mladost exist in athletics, cricket, field hockey, judo, basketball, bowling on ice and asphalt, fencing, volleyball, swimming, rugby, synchronised swimming, skiing, ice-hockey, ice skating, table tennis, archery, chess, tennis, water polo and rowing.

== Overview ==
Probably the most renowned sections are water polo, swimming, volleyball, rowing and in more recent times ice hockey. The water polo club Mladost often wins the Croatian championships and competes in the European club championships, while the swimming club regularly organizes international swimming events.

It should be stated that HAVK Mladost (water polo section of HAŠK Mladost) is one of the most successful clubs in the history of European championships in that sport. HAVK Mladost won, among others, these international competitions:

European champions: 1968, 1969, 1970, 1972, 1990, 1991, 1996

Cup Winners cup: 1976, 1999

LEN trophy: 2001

European super cup: 1976, 1990, 1996

Many of the Mladost facilities are located on lake Jarun in southwestern parts of Zagreb.

== Member clubs ==
- HAAK Mladost - athletics - based in the Sportski Park Mladost stadium in Jarun
- HAKK Mladost - basketball
- HAOK Mladost - volleyball
- HAPK Mladost - swimming
- HAVK Mladost - waterpolo
- HARK Mladost - rugby
- HAHK Mladost - field hockey
