= Gaziantep Polisgücü SK (men's hockey) =

Turkish field hockey club

- League: Turkish Field Hockey Men's Super League; Turkish Indoor Hockey Men's Super League
- Founded: 2003; 23 years ago

Personnel
- Manager: Celal Akarcay

Active departments of Gaziantep Polisgücü SK
Football	Handball
Hockey (M, W)	Shooting

The Gaziantep Polisgücü Hockey (Turkish: Gaziantep Polisgücü Spor Kulübü Hokey Takımı) is a Turkish men's field hockey side of Gaziantep Polisgücü SK based in Gaziantep, Turkey. Founded in 2003, it is sponsored by the Gaziantep Police Directorate. The team plays in the Turkish Field Hockey Men's Super League (Turkish: Türkiye Erkekler Açık Alan Hokey Süper Ligi) and Turkish Indoor Hockey Men's Super League (Turkish: Türkiye Erkekler Salon Hokeyi Süper Ligi).

As of May 2013, the hockey side has a total of 112 sportspeople consisting of 16 boys in the U12-age category, 18 boys in the U14, 22 boys in the U16, 20 boys in the youth (U18), 18 juniors (U21) and 18 senior players. 32 players of the team were admitted to the Turkey national teams sofar.

Between 2003 and 2013, the Gaziantep Polisgücü Hockey team became twelve times Turkish champion, four times Turkish championship runner-up, and ranked three times on place third. The club's junior team won the 2012 Turkish Indoor Championships in Aksaray, and the senior team became Turkish field hockey champion held in Zonguldak the same year. They won also the 2012-13 Turkish Indoor Super League held on January 30-February 3, 2013 in Mengen, Bolu Province.

In 2008, Gaziantep Polisgücü played at the Eurohockey Men’s Club Champions Challenge IV held on May 8–11 in Moravske Toplice, Slovenia, and placed third. The team qualified for the participation at the 2013 Eurohockey Men’s Club Champions Challenge III held on May 17–20 in Bratislava, Slovakia. They became champion of the division defeating the teams from Finland, Denmark and Bulgaria. The team is promoted to one higher division for the next year's championship. Team member Orhun Özel scored 10 of the total 28 goals in four games, and was named Top Scorer of the tournament.

== Current squad ==
As of 2025–26.

Head coach: (Turkey) Yusuf Kasım

No.	Pos.	Nation	Player
1		TUR	Ali Akın Özkılıç
2		IRI	Yaghoub Bahrami
3		TUR	Mehmet Kerim Bayır
5		TUR	Hakim Taşar
6		TUR	Furkan Mehmet Özkılıç
8		ARG	Americo Emilio Choque

No.	Pos.	Nation	Player
10		IRI	Reza Norouzzadehr
11		TUR	Mehmet Ali Demirel
14		ARG	Nehuen Ayala Gallo
21		TUR	Müslüm Ekinci
28		TUR	Tolunay Kasım
31		TUR	İbrahim Şamil Köşker

== International participations ==
As of April 2026.

=== Indoor hockey ===
Year	Host	Competition	Result
2014	SRB, Banya Kanjiža	EuroHockey Indoor Club Challenge II	2nd place, silver medalist(s)
2017	TUR, Alanya	EuroHockey Indoor Club Challenge II	1st place, gold medalist(s)
2024	AUT, Vienna	EuroHockey Indoor Club Cup	5th
2025	SUI, Wettingen	EuroHockey Indoor Club Cup	7th
2026	AUT, Vienna	EuroHockey Indoor Club Trophy	4th

=== Field hockey ===
Year	Host	Competition	Result
2008	SLO Moravske Toplice	European Club Challenge IV	3rd place, bronze medalist(s)
2013	SVK, Bratislava	EuroHockey Club Challenge III	1st place, gold medalist(s)
2015	SUI, Wettingen	EuroHockey Club Challenge I	7th
2016	SVK, Bratislava	EuroHockey Club Challenge II	3rd place, bronze medalist(s)
2017	GIB, Gibraltar	EuroHockey Club Challenge II	3rd place, bronze medalist(s)
2018	DEN, Copenhagen	EuroHockey Club Challenge III	1st place, gold medalist(s)
2019	TUR, Alanaya	EuroHockey Club Challenge III	1st place, gold medalist(s)
2021	SLO, Predanovci	EuroHockey Club Challenge II	1st place, gold medalist(s)
2022	DEN, Copenhagen	EuroHockey Club Challenge I	3rd place, bronze medalist(s)
2023	NIR, Banbridge	EuroHockey Club Trophy II	6th
2024	TUR, Konya	EuroHockey Club Challenge I	3rd place, bronze medalist(s)
