= Maxime Plennevaux =

Belgian field hockey player

Max Plennevaux
Personal information
- Full name: Maxime Georges; Alexandre Plennevaux
- Born: 14 June 1993 (age 33) Belgium

Sport
- Sport: Field hockey
- Position: Forward
- Club: Uccle Sport
Youth career
- Team
- –: Waterloo Ducks
- 2010–2011: Léopold
Senior career
Years	Team	Caps	Goals
2011–2017	Léopold	-	-
2017–2018	Real Club de Polo	-	-
2018–2019	HGC	-	-
2019–2022	Léopold	-	-
2022–2023	Orée	-	-
2023–present	Uccle Sport	-	-
National team
Years	Team	Caps	Goals
2013–2014	Belgium U21	10	(6)
2014–2020	Belgium	31	(13)
2016–present	Belgium (indoor)	22	(16)
Medal record
Representing Belgium
Men's indoor hockey
EuroHockey Indoor Championship
Silver medal – second place	2018 Antwerp

Maxime Georges Alexandre Plennevaux (born 14 June 1993) is a Belgian field hockey player who plays as a forward for Uccle Sport.

== Club career ==
Plennevaux started playing hockey at Waterloo Ducks who he left for Royal Léopold when he was 17 years old. He left Léopold in 2017 for Real Club de Polo in the Spanish División de Honor. In the 2018–19 season he played for HGC in the Dutch Hoofdklasse. In 2019 he returned to Léopold. After three seasons at Léopold he left them for another Brussels club Royal Orée. He was signed by Uccle Sport for the 2023–24 season.

== International career ==
In 2013, Plennevaux was a member of the Belgium under-21 side at the FIH Junior World Cup in New Delhi, India. He followed this up with an appearance in 2014 at the EuroHockey Junior Championship in Waterloo, Belgium. He debuted for the Red Lions in 2014 in a test match against the Netherlands in Uccle. His first major tournament with the national team was the inaugural tournament of the FIH Pro League, where he won a silver medal.
