= 2020–21 Women's Belgian Hockey League =

Belgian Hockey League
- Season: 2020–21
- Dates: 10 September 2020 – 9 May 2021
- Champions: Gantoise
- Regular season: Gantoise (3rd title)
- Relegated: Leuven; Wellington
- Euro Hockey League: Gantoise
- EuroHockey Club Trophy: Dragons
- Matches played: 154
- Goals scored: 549 (3.56 per match)
- Top goalscorer: Ambre Ballenghien; Alix Gerniers (18 goals)
- Biggest home win: Waterloo Ducks 7–0 Wellington
- Biggest away win: Wellington 0–8 Gantoise; Mechelse 1–9 Dragons
- Highest scoring: Léopold 6–9 Gantoise

The 2020–21 Women's Belgian Hockey League was the 95th season of the Women's Belgian Hockey League, the top women's Belgian field hockey league.

The season started on 10 September 2020 and concluded on 9 May 2021 with the second match of the championship final. Gantoise won the title for the third time.

== Changes from 2019–20 ==
For the first time in history, the league was played with 14 teams instead of 12. Teams played each other once in a single round-robin format, with the top eight teams qualifying for the play–offs and the bottom six progressing to the relegation series.

== Teams ==
2021–22 Women's Belgian Hockey League teams
Location of Brussels teams in the 2021–22 Women's Belgian Hockey League

Team	Location	Province
Antwerp	Sint-Job-in-'t-Goor	Antwerp
Braxgata	Boom	Antwerp
Daring	Molenbeek-Saint-Jean	Brussels
Dragons	Brasschaat	Antwerp
Gantoise	Ghent	East Flanders
Herakles	Lier	Antwerp
Léopold	Uccle	Brussels
Leuven	Heverlee	Flemish Brabant
Mechelse	Mechelen	Antwerp
Racing	Uccle	Brussels
Victory	Edegem	Antwerp
Waterloo Ducks	Waterloo	Walloon Brabant
Wellington	Uccle	Brussels
White Star	Evere	Brussels

=== Number of teams by provinces ===
Province	Number of teams	Team(s)
Antwerp	6	Antwerp, Braxgata, Dragons, Herakles, Mechelse, Victory
Brussels	5	Daring, Léopold, Racing, Wellington, White Star
East Flanders	1	Gantoise
Flemish Brabant	1	Leuven
Walloon Brabant	1	Waterloo Ducks
Total	14	

== Regular season ==
=== Standings ===
Pos	Team	Pld	W	D	L	GF	GA	GD	Pts	Qualification or relegation
1	Gantoise	13	12	1	0	56	12	+44	37	Qualification for the play-offs
2	Daring	13	8	4	1	29	18	+11	28	Qualification for the play-offs
3	Dragons	13	8	2	3	39	14	+25	26	Qualification for the play-offs
4	Braxgata	13	7	3	3	25	11	+14	24	Qualification for the play-offs
5	Antwerp	13	7	1	5	28	17	+11	22	Qualification for the play-offs
6	Racing	13	7	1	5	22	20	+2	22	Qualification for the play-offs
7	Herakles	13	6	3	4	23	16	+7	21	Qualification for the play-offs
8	Victory	13	6	3	4	20	25	−5	21	Qualification for the play-offs
9	Waterloo Ducks	13	5	3	5	28	19	+9	18	Qualification for the Play–downs
10	Léopold	13	5	0	8	28	36	−8	15	Qualification for the Play–downs
11	White Star	13	3	1	9	15	37	−22	10	Qualification for the Play–downs
12	Mechelse	13	2	2	9	10	34	−24	8	Qualification for the Play–downs
13	Wellington	13	2	0	11	8	50	−42	6	Qualification for the Play–downs
14	Leuven	13	1	0	12	13	35	−22	3	Qualification for the Play–downs

Source: OKEY
Rules for classification: 1) points; 2) matches won; 3) goal difference; 4) goals for; 5) head-to-head result.

=== Results ===
Home \ Away	ANT	BRA	DAR	DRA	GAN	HER	LÉO	LEU	MEC	RAC	VIC	WAT	WEL	WHI
Antwerp	—			2–4			1–0		4–0		0–1	3–1	5–0	4–2
Braxgata	1–1	—				2–1	3–1	2–0		0–2				3–1
Daring	3–2	2–1	—		0–1	3–3		4–1		1–1			2–0	
Dragons		0–2	1–2	—	0–2	1–0		3–0		3–1			6–0	
Gantoise	2–1	1–0			—	1–1		4–0		5–1				7–1
Herakles	1–2					—	1–2		1–1	2–0	2–0			4–1
Léopold			2–4	1–5	6–9		—		2–1		1–4	2–1		
Leuven	1–3					1–3	1–3	—		2–3	1–2			5–2
Mechelse		0–0	1–2	1–9	0–5			1–0	—			0–4		
Racing	1–0						3–1		2–1	—	5–2	0–2	3–0	0–1
Victory		0–4	2–2	2–2	1–5				2–1		—	2–1		
Waterloo Ducks		2–2	1–1	1–1	1–6	1–2		3–0				—	7–0	
Wellington		0–5			0–8	1–2	1–6	2–1	2–3		0–1		—	
White Star			2–3	0–4			2–1		1–0		1–1	0–3	1–2	—

Source: OKEY
Legend: Blue = home team win; Yellow = draw; Red = away team win.

== Play–downs ==
The points obtained during the regular season were halved before the start of the play-downs. As a result, the teams started with the following points before the play-downs: Waterloo Ducks 9 points, Léopold 7.5, White Star 5, Mechelse 4, Wellington 3 and Leuven 1.5.

Pos	Team	Pld	W	D	L	GF	GA	GD	Pts	Relegation	WAT	WHI	LÉO	MEC	LEU	WEL
1	Waterloo Ducks	10	10	0	0	36	9	+27	39		—	1–0	4–2	2–1	3–2	7–2
2	White Star	10	5	0	5	16	16	0	20		0–3	—	0–1	1–0	3–0	3–1
3	Léopold	10	3	3	4	14	17	−3	19.5		0–5	3–0	—	0–1	1–1	1–1
4	Mechelse	10	2	4	4	7	13	−6	14		2–7	3–2	0–0	—	1–1	0–0
5	Leuven	10	3	3	4	14	20	−6	13.5	Relegation to National 1	0–3	2–4	3–2	0–0	—	2–1
6	Wellington	10	1	2	7	12	24	−12	8	Relegation to National 1	0–1	2–3	2–4	1–0	2–3	—

Source: OKEY
Rules for classification: 1) points; 2) matches won; 3) goal difference; 4) goals for; 5) head-to-head result.

== Play–offs ==
The points obtained during the regular season were halved before the start of the play-downs. As a result, the teams started with the following points before the play-offs: Gantoise 18.5 points, Daring 14, Dragons 13, Braxgata 12, Antwerp 11, Racing 11, Herakles 10.5 and Victory 10.5.

=== Pool A ===
Pos	Team	Pld	W	D	L	GF	GA	GD	Pts	SF	GAN	ANT	VIC	BRA
1	Gantoise	6	6	0	0	17	2	+15	36.5	Advanced to semi-finals	—	3–1	3–0	3–0
2	Antwerp	6	2	2	2	10	7	+3	19	Advanced to semi-finals	0–1	—	4–0	1–1
3	Victory	6	2	0	4	5	16	−11	16.5		0–5	1–3	—	2–0
4	Braxgata	6	0	2	4	4	11	−7	14		1–2	1–1	1–2	—

Source: OKEY
Rules for classification: 1) points; 2) matches won; 3) goal difference; 4) goals for; 5) head-to-head result.

=== Pool B ===
Pos	Team	Pld	W	D	L	GF	GA	GD	Pts	SF	DRA	RAC	DAR	HER
1	Dragons	6	4	1	1	14	5	+9	26	Advanced to semi-finals	—	4–0	2–3	2–0
2	Racing	6	4	1	1	12	7	+5	24	Advanced to semi-finals	1–1	—	2–0	3–0
3	Daring	6	3	0	3	8	8	0	23		1–2	0–2	—	1–0
4	Herakles	6	0	0	6	2	16	−14	10.5		0–3	2–4	0–3	—

Source: OKEY
Rules for classification: 1) points; 2) matches won; 3) goal difference; 4) goals for; 5) head-to-head result.

== Classification matches ==
=== Fifth to eighth place classification ===
==== Seventh and eighth place ====
25 April 2021
12:00

Braxgata	4–0	Herakles
Van Grimbergen 13'; Vorushylo 44'; J. Vandermeiren 51'; Ikegwuonu 58'	Report

Braxgata HC, Boom

==== Fifth and sixth place ====
25 April 2021
12:00

Victory	1–2	Daring
Bruni 15'	Report	Jardel 41'; Ferrazzini 53'

Royal Victory HC, Edegem

=== First to fourth place classification ===
Semi-finals
Gantoise	5	2
Racing	1	1
Dragons	3	1
Antwerp	1	0

Final
Gantoise	3	3
Dragons	0	2
Third place
Racing	3
Antwerp	2

==== Semi-finals ====
25 April 2021
12:00

Racing	1–5	Gantoise
Boon 12'	Report	Gerniers 6'; Ballenghien 27', 28'; Schreurs 49'; S. Vanden Borre 58'

Royal Racing Club Bruxelles, Uccle
Umpires:
Lucien Vanderborght (BEL)
Alexandra Mahieu (BEL)

2 May 2021
12:00

Gantoise	2–1	Racing
Oviedo 11'; Sinia 52'	Report	Rasir 37'

La Gantoise HC, Ghent
Umpires:
Alexandra Mahieu (BEL)
Anne van den Bosch (BEL)

Gantoise won the series 2–0.

25 April 2021
15:00

Antwerp	1–3	Dragons
Delforge 66'	Report	Struyf 4'; Magis 9'; De Groof 52'

Royal Antwerp HC, Antwerp
Umpires:
Magali Sergeant (BEL)
Pieter Verleye (BEL)

2 May 2021
12:00

Dragons	1–0	Antwerp
Magis 17'	Report

KHC Dragons, Brasschaat
Umpires:
Magali Sergeant (BEL)
Pauline Cuypers (BEL)

Dragons won the series 2–0.

==== Third and fourth place ====
8 May 2021
13:00

Racing	3–2	Antwerp
De Mot 21'; Boon 22'; Haussener 51'	Report	M. Struijk 37'; Rebecchi 68'

Wilrijkse Plein, Antwerp
Umpires:
Lucien Vanderborght (BEL)
Pieter Verleye (BEL)

==== Final ====
8 May 2021
15:00

Gantoise	3–0	Dragons
Schreurs 32'; S. Vanden Borre 44'; Nelen 47'	Report

Wilrijkse Plein, Antwerp
Umpires:
Anne van den Bosch (BEL)
Louise de Clercq (BEL)

9 May 2021
15:00

Dragons	2–3	Gantoise
Magis 4'; De Groof 66'	Report	Schreurs 43'; A. Vanden Borre 51'; Ballenghien 61'

Wilrijkse Plein, Antwerp
Umpires:
Pauline Cuypers (BEL)
Magali Sergeant (BEL)

Gantoise won the series 2–0, winning the title.

== Top Goalscorers ==
Goalscoring Table
Pos.	Player	Club	FG	PC	PS	Total
1	(Belgium) Ambre Ballenghien	Gantoise	11	5	1	18
1	(Belgium) Alix Gerniers	Gantoise	17	1	0	18
3	(Argentina) Priscila Jardel	Daring	10	6	0	16
4	(Argentina) Carla Rebecchi	Antwerp	7	7	0	14
5	(Belgium) Noa Schreurs	Gantoise	11	1	0	12
5	(Belgium) Jill Boon	Racing	6	5	1	12
7	(Belgium) Stéphanie Vanden Borre	Gantoise	0	11	0	11
8	(Netherlands) Valerie Magis	Dragons	1	7	2	10
8	(Belgium) Manon Simons	Dragons	7	3	0	10
8	(Belgium) Zoë Dujardin	Leuven	7	3	0	10
8	(Belgium) Marie Ronquetti	Waterloo Ducks	10	0	0	10
