= 2021–22 Women's Belgian Hockey League =

Belgian Hockey League
- Season: 2021–22
- Dates: 5 September 2021 – 8 May 2022
- Champions: Gantoise (4th title)
- Regular season: Gantoise
- Relegated: Mechelse; White Star
- Euro Hockey League: Gantoise
- Euro Hockey Club Trophy: Dragons
- Matches played: 132
- Goals scored: 523 (3.96 per match)
- Top goalscorer: Louise Versavel (Braxgata) (23 goals)
- Biggest home win: Gantoise 12–1 Mechelse
- Biggest away win: Herakles 0–9 Gantoise
- Highest scoring: Gantoise 12–1 Mechelse
- All statistics correct as of 24 April 2022.

The 2021–22 Women's Belgian Hockey League was the 96th season of the Women's Belgian Hockey League, the top women's Belgian field hockey league.

The season started on 5 September 2021 and concluded on 8 May 2022 with the second match of the championship final. Gantoise are the defending champions.

== Changes from 2020–21 ==
This season will again be played with 12 instead of 14 teams. Each team will play each other twice and the top four teams will advance to the championship play-offs. The bottom two teams will be relegated directly and the team in 10th place will play a relegation play-off against the third placed team in the second division.

== Teams ==
2021–22 Women's Belgian Hockey League teams
Location of Brussels teams in the 2021–22 Women's Belgian Hockey League

Team	Location	Province
Antwerp	Sint-Job-in-'t-Goor	Antwerp
Braxgata	Boom	Antwerp
Daring	Molenbeek-Saint-Jean	Brussels
Dragons	Brasschaat	Antwerp
Gantoise	Ghent	East Flanders
Herakles	Lier	Antwerp
Léopold	Uccle	Brussels
Mechelse	Mechelen	Antwerp
Racing	Uccle	Brussels
Victory	Edegem	Antwerp
Waterloo Ducks	Waterloo	Walloon Brabant
White Star	Evere	Brussels

=== Number of teams by provinces ===
Province	Number of teams	Team(s)
Antwerp	6	Antwerp, Braxgata, Dragons, Herakles, Mechelse, Victory
Brussels	4	Daring, Léopold, Racing, White Star
East Flanders	1	Gantoise
Walloon Brabant	1	Waterloo Ducks
Total	12	

== Regular season ==
=== Standings ===
Pos	Team	Pld	W	D	L	GF	GA	GD	Pts	Qualification or relegation
1	Gantoise	22	20	2	0	106	15	+91	62	Qualification for the Euro Hockey League and the play-offs
2	Dragons	22	14	6	2	65	32	+33	48	Qualification for the play-offs
3	Braxgata	22	14	2	6	50	30	+20	44	Qualification for the play-offs
4	Racing	22	13	5	4	55	27	+28	44	Qualification for the play-offs
5	Waterloo Ducks	22	12	2	8	50	40	+10	38	
6	Daring	22	9	2	11	37	51	−14	29	
7	Antwerp	22	8	3	11	33	44	−11	27	
8	Victory	22	8	1	13	33	47	−14	25	
9	Herakles	22	7	1	14	30	57	−27	22	
10	Léopold	22	5	2	15	29	57	−28	17	Qualification for the relegation play-offs
11	White Star	22	4	5	13	24	45	−21	17	Relegation to the National 1
12	Mechelse	22	1	3	18	11	78	−67	6	Relegation to the National 1

Source: OKEY
Rules for classification: 1) points; 2) matches won; 3) goal difference; 4) goals for; 5) head-to-head result.

=== Results ===
Home \ Away	ANT	BRA	DAR	DRA	GAN	HER	LEO	MEC	RAC	VIC	WAT	WHI
Antwerp	—	1–1	1–2	4–4	0–3	4–1	3–2	4–1	1–3	1–2	1–0	1–0
Braxgata	1–0	—	1–2	4–2	0–4	3–0	3–2	3–0	1–0	6–1	3–1	3–1
Daring	2–0	0–7	—	1–2	2–3	1–5	4–3	3–1	1–3	0–2	2–5	1–1
Dragons	3–2	3–1	3–1	—	1–3	4–0	4–1	8–0	3–3	2–2	2–1	2–0
Gantoise	6–0	4–1	5–1	2–2	—	4–0	10–0	12–1	5–0	7–1	1–0	5–1
Herakles	1–1	1–0	2–3	1–2	0–9	—	2–1	4–0	0–5	0–4	2–4	4–1
Léopold	3–1	1–3	0–4	1–1	0–3	2–1	—	1–0	1–1	1–2	0–1	4–0
Mechelse	1–3	0–0	0–3	0–3	0–5	1–1	2–1	—	0–4	1–3	1–6	1–1
Racing	5–1	4–1	1–0	2–4	2–2	0–1	5–1	5–0	—	2–0	2–2	2–1
Victory	0–1	0–3	1–2	2–3	1–4	1–2	1–2	2–0	1–4	—	0–1	2–0
Waterloo Ducks	3–2	0–1	4–1	0–6	2–5	5–2	3–0	3–0	1–1	4–3	—	2–1
White Star	0–0	3–4	1–1	1–1	0–4	1–0	3–2	3–1	0–1	1–2	4–2	—

Source: OKEY
Legend: Blue = home team win; Yellow = draw; Red = away team win.

== Play–offs ==
=== Bracket ===
Semi-finals
Gantoise	4	1
Braxgata	1	1
Dragons	2	0
Racing	1	0

Final
Gantoise	3	3
Dragons	1	0
Third place
Braxgata	0
Racing	4

=== Semi-finals ===
30 April 2022
15:30

Braxgata	1–4	Gantoise
Civera 38'	Report	Schreurs 14'; Sinia 19'; Ballenghien 63'; A. Vanden Borre 66'

Braxgata HC, Boom
Umpires:
Magali Sergeant (BEL)
Antoine Forton (BEL)

1 May 2022
15:30

Gantoise	1–1	Braxgata
Ballenghien 24'	Report	Versavel 68'

La Gantoise HC, Ghent
Umpires:
Anne van den Bosch (BEL)
Louise de Clercq (BEL)

Gantoise won the series 1–0.

30 April 2022
15:30

Racing	1–2	Dragons
Boon 33'	Report	Raye 20'; Herzsprung 38'

Stade du Vivier d'Oie, Uccle
Umpires:
Thalia Bellemans (BEL)
Antoine Colemonts (BEL)

1 May 2022
15:30

Dragons	0–0	Racing
	Report

KHC Dragons, Brasschaat
Umpires:
Magali Sergeant (BEL)
Pauline Cuypers (BEL)

Dragons won the series 1–0.

=== Third and fourth place ===
7 May 2022
11:00

Braxgata	0–4	Racing
	Report	Holz 12'; Sistermans 22'; A. Willems 32'; Puvrez 67'

Louvain-la-Neuve HC, Louvain-la-Neuve
Umpires:
Thalia Bellemans (BEL)
Antoine Colemonts (BEL)

=== Final ===
7 May 2022
13:30

Dragons	1–3	Gantoise
D. Marien 45'	Report	Ballenghien 4'; Gaspari 23'; Schreurs 41'

Louvain-la-Neuve HC, Louvain-la-Neuve
Umpires:
Pauline Cuypers (BEL)
Louise de Clercq (BEL)

8 May 2022
13:30

Gantoise	3–0	Dragons
Ballenghien 11', 38'; Gerniers 21'	Report

Louvain-la-Neuve HC, Louvain-la-Neuve
Umpires:
Magali Sergeant (BEL)
Anne van den Bosch (BEL)

Gantoise won the series 2–0.

== Top goalscorers ==
As of 24 April 2022

Goalscoring Table
Pos.	Player	Club	FG	PC	PS	Total
1	(Belgium) Louise Versavel	Braxgata	18	4	1	23
2	(Belgium) Emilie Sinia	Gantoise	16	5	0	21
3	(Belgium) Ambre Ballenghien	Gantoise	16	4	0	20
4	(Belgium) Charlotte Englebert	Racing	9	6	1	16
5	(Belgium) Abigail Raye	Dragons	11	4	0	15
5	(Belgium) Stéphanie Vanden Borre	Gantoise	2	11	2	15
7	(Italy) Lara Oviedo	Gantoise	12	1	0	13
8	(Belgium) Joanne Peeters	Waterloo Ducks	0	11	1	12
9	(Argentina) Priscila Jardel	Daring	4	3	3	10
9	(Belgium) Stéphanie de Groof	Dragons	0	10	0	10
9	(Belgium) Noa Schreurs	Gantoise	10	0	0	10
