= 2021 Women's EuroHockey Championship squads =

This article lists the confirmed squads for the 2021 Women's EuroHockey Nations Championship tournament held in Amstelveen, Netherlands between 5 and 13 June 2021. The eight national teams were required to register a playing squad of eighteen players and two reserves.

Age, caps and club for each player are as of 5 June 2021, the first day of the tournament.

== Pool A ==
=== Ireland ===
Head coach: (Australia) Sean Dancer

Ireland announced their final squad on 20 May 2021.

No.	Pos.	Player	Date of birth (age)	Caps	Club
1	GK	Ayeisha McFerran	10 January 1996 (aged 25)	100	(Netherlands) Kampong
2	GK	Elizabeth Murphy	28 June 1998 (aged 22)	13	(Ireland) Loreto
4		Zara Malseed	11 June 1997 (aged 23)	2	
5		Michelle Carey	5 May 1999 (aged 22)	0	(Ireland) UCD
6	MF	Roisin Upton	1 April 1994 (aged 27)	76	(Ireland) Catholic Institute
8	FW	Nikki Evans	17 January 1990 (aged 31)	198	(Ireland) Old Alex
9	FW	Katie Mullan (Captain)	7 April 1994 (aged 27)	193	(Ireland) Ballymoney
10	DF	Shirley McCay	7 June 1988 (aged 32)	306	(Ireland) Pegasus
11	MF	Megan Frazer	2 October 1990 (aged 30)	136	(Ireland) Belfast Harlequins
12	DF	Lena Tice	16 November 1997 (aged 23)	109	(Ireland) Old Alex
13	FW	Naomi Carroll	13 September 1992 (aged 28)	111	(Ireland) Catholic Institute
17	DF	Hannah McLoughlin	2 December 1999 (aged 21)	14	(Ireland) UCD
20	MF	Chloe Watkins	7 March 1992 (aged 29)	226	(Ireland) Monkstown
21	MF	Lizzie Colvin	4 January 1990 (aged 31)	196	(Ireland) Belfast Harlequins
22	FW	Nicci Daly	3 April 1988 (aged 33)	191	(Ireland) Loreto
23	DF	Hannah Matthews	24 March 1991 (aged 30)	147	(Ireland) Loreto
25	FW	Sarah Hawkshaw	4 November 1995 (aged 25)	33	(Ireland) Railway Union
26	FW	Anna O'Flanagan	18 February 1990 (aged 31)	207	(Ireland) Muckross
28	FW	Deirdre Duke	9 June 1992 (aged 28)	141	(Ireland) Old Alex
30		Sarah McAuley	25 September 2001 (aged 19)	1	(Ireland) Muckross

=== Netherlands ===
Head coach: (Australia) Alyson Annan

The Netherlands announced their final squad on 31 May 2021.

No.	Pos.	Player	Date of birth (age)	Caps	Club
1	GK	Anne Veenendaal	7 September 1995 (aged 25)	79	(Netherlands) Amsterdam
3	DF	Sanne Koolen	23 March 1996 (aged 25)	44	(Netherlands) Den Bosch
5	MF	Malou Pheninckx	24 July 1991 (aged 29)	95	(Netherlands) Kampong
6	MF	Laurien Leurink	13 November 1994 (aged 26)	108	(Netherlands) SCHC
8	MF	Marloes Keetels	4 May 1993 (aged 28)	152	(Netherlands) Den Bosch
11	FW	Maria Verschoor	22 April 1994 (aged 27)	139	(Netherlands) Amsterdam
13	DF	Caia van Maasakker	5 April 1989 (aged 32)	199	(Netherlands) SCHC
15	FW	Frédérique Matla	28 December 1996 (aged 24)	77	(Netherlands) Den Bosch
18	DF	Pien Sanders	11 June 1998 (aged 22)	58	(Netherlands) Den Bosch
20	MF	Laura Nunnink	26 January 1995 (aged 26)	126	(Netherlands) Den Bosch
21	DF	Lauren Stam	30 January 1994 (aged 27)	92	(Netherlands) Amsterdam
22	GK	Josine Koning	2 September 1995 (aged 25)	73	(Netherlands) Den Bosch
23	DF	Margot van Geffen	23 November 1989 (aged 31)	205	(Netherlands) Den Bosch
24	MF	Eva de Goede (Captain)	23 March 1989 (aged 32)	236	(Netherlands) Amsterdam
29	MF	Stella van Gils	4 August 1999 (aged 21)	1	(Netherlands) Pinoké
33	MF	Ilse Kappelle	13 May 1998 (aged 23)	4	(Netherlands) Amsterdam
34	FW	Pien Dicke	28 August 1999 (aged 21)	8	(Netherlands) SCHC
35	MF	Felice Albers	27 December 1999 (aged 21)	5	(Netherlands) Amsterdam

=== Scotland ===
Head coach: (South Africa) Jennifer Wilson

Scotland announced their final squad on 21 May 2021.

No.	Pos.	Player	Date of birth (age)	Caps	Club
1	FW	Jen Eadie	8 August 1995 (aged 25)	62	(Scotland) Clydesdale Western
2	GK	Nicola Cochrane	8 December 1993 (aged 27)	83	(England) Wimbledon
3	FW	Louise Campbell	1 April 1994 (aged 27)	38	(Scotland) Edinburgh University
5	MF	Laura Swanson	29 October 1998 (aged 22)	11	(Germany) Club an der Alster
6	DF	Becky Ward (Co-captain)	12 December 1988 (aged 32)	166	(Scotland) Western Wildcats
7	MF	McKenzie Bell	9 May 1997 (aged 24)	11	(Scotland) Uddingston
8	DF	Amy Costello	14 January 1998 (aged 23)	83	(England) East Grinstead
10	MF	Sarah Robertson	27 September 1993 (aged 27)	153	(England) Hampstead & Westminster
11	FW	Fiona Semple	15 November 1991 (aged 29)	29	(Scotland) Clydesdale Western
12	FW	Charlotte Watson	23 April 1998 (aged 23)	76	(England) Loughborough Students
17	FW	Sarah Jamieson	5 May 1994 (aged 27)	59	(Scotland) Watsonians
20		Bronwyn Shields	1 February 2001 (aged 20)	0	(Scotland) Clydesdale Western
22	MF	Emily Dark	8 August 2000 (aged 20)	23	(Scotland) Dundee Wanderers
25	MF	Kate Holmes	25 November 1994 (aged 26)	71	(Scotland) Western Wildcats
26	DF	Robyn Collins	23 September 1992 (aged 28)	65	(England) Surbiton
27	FW	Fiona Burnet	10 October 1996 (aged 24)	65	(England) Wimbledon
28	DF	Rebecca Condie (Co-captain)	3 May 1990 (aged 31)	68	(England) Gloucester
29	GK	Amy Gibson	13 July 1989 (aged 31)	111	(Germany) Club an der Alster
37		Elizabeth Wilson	28 February 2000 (aged 21)	1	(Scotland) Dundee Wanderers

=== Spain ===
Head coach: (England) Adrian Lock

Spain announced their final squad on 24 May 2021.

No.	Pos.	Player	Date of birth (age)	Caps	Club
1	GK	María Ruiz	18 March 1990 (aged 31)	157	(Spain) Club de Campo
2		Laura Barrios	4 September 2000 (aged 20)	0	(Spain) Club de Campo
7	FW	Carlota Petchame	25 June 1990 (aged 30)	200	(Spain) Junior
8	FW	Carola Salvatella	8 July 1994 (aged 26)	142	(Spain) Club Egara
9	DF	María López García	16 February 1990 (aged 31)	193	(Spain) Club de Campo
10	FW	Berta Bonastre	3 June 1992 (aged 29)	193	(Spain) Club Egara
13	FW	Belén Iglesias	6 July 1996 (aged 24)	53	(Germany) Großflottbek
16		Candela Mejías	27 January 1997 (aged 24)	22	(Spain) Club de Campo
17	DF	Lola Riera	25 June 1991 (aged 29)	184	(Spain) Complutense
18	MF	Júlia Pons	27 July 1994 (aged 26)	169	(Spain) CD Terrassa
19	FW	Begoña García Grau	19 July 1995 (aged 25)	135	(Spain) Club de Campo
20	DF	Xantal Giné	23 September 1992 (aged 28)	152	(Spain) Real Club de Polo
21	MF	Beatriz Pérez	4 May 1991 (aged 30)	206	(Spain) Club de Campo
23	MF	Georgina Oliva (Captain)	18 July 1990 (aged 30)	235	(Spain) Junior
24	MF	Alejandra Torres-Quevedo	30 September 1999 (aged 21)	43	(Spain) Club de Campo
25	FW	Alicia Magaz	24 May 1994 (aged 27)	105	(Spain) Club de Campo
29	MF	Lucía Jiménez	8 January 1997 (aged 24)	125	(Spain) Complutense
30		Patricia Álvarez	4 March 1998 (aged 23)	0	(Spain) Complutense
32	GK	Melaní García	21 September 1990 (aged 30)	67	(Spain) Real Club de Polo

== Pool B ==
=== Belgium ===
Head coach: (Netherlands) Raoul Ehren

Belgium announced their final squad on 25 May 2021.

No.	Pos.	Player	Date of birth (age)	Caps	Club
3	MF	Justine Rasir	4 December 2001 (aged 19)	9	(Belgium) Racing
5	FW	Abigail Raye	17 May 1991 (aged 30)	23	(Belgium) Dragons
6	MF	Charlotte Englebert	20 May 2001 (aged 20)	12	(Belgium) Racing
7	MF	Judith Vandermeiren	10 August 1994 (aged 26)	174	(Belgium) Braxgata
8	DF	Emma Puvrez	25 July 1997 (aged 23)	140	(Belgium) Antwerp
10	FW	Louise Versavel	29 April 1995 (aged 26)	193	(Belgium) Braxgata
13	FW	Alix Gerniers (Captain)	29 June 1993 (aged 27)	213	(Belgium) Gantoise
16	DF	Tiphaine Duquesne	22 August 1996 (aged 24)	49	(Belgium) Waterloo Ducks
17	MF	Michelle Struijk (Captain)	24 June 1998 (aged 22)	67	(Belgium) Antwerp
19	MF	Barbara Nelen (Captain)	20 August 1991 (aged 29)	266	(Belgium) Gantoise
22	DF	Stephanie Vanden Borre	14 September 1997 (aged 23)	133	(Belgium) Gantoise
23	GK	Elena Sotgiu	18 July 1995 (aged 25)	45	(Belgium) Braxgata
25	MF	Pauline Leclef	31 May 1995 (aged 26)	101	(Netherlands) Oranje-Rood
26	DF	Lien Hillewaert	27 November 1997 (aged 23)	84	(Belgium) Braxgata
29	GK	Elodie Picard	8 September 1997 (aged 23)	20	(Belgium) Antwerp
30	FW	Ambre Ballenghien	13 December 2000 (aged 20)	37	(Belgium) Gantoise
36	DF	Hélène Brasseur	4 January 2002 (aged 19)	5	(Belgium) Gantoise
37	FW	France De Mot	30 January 2002 (aged 19)	3	(Belgium) Racing

=== England ===
Head coach: (Australia) Mark Hager

England announced their final squad on 28 May 2021. On 31 May, Shona McCallin was replaced by Catherine De Ledesma due to a foot injury.

No.	Pos.	Player	Date of birth (age)	Caps	Goals	Club
1	GK	Maddie Hinch	8 October 1988 (aged 32)	153	0	None
4	DF	Laura Unsworth	8 March 1988 (aged 33)	271	11	(England) East Grinstead
5	MF	Sarah Evans	12 April 1991 (aged 30)	117	6	(England) Surbiton
6	DF	Anna Toman	29 April 1993 (aged 28)	86	6	(England) Wimbledon
8	MF	Esme Burge	15 May 1999 (aged 22)	8	0	(England) Hampstead & Westminster
9	MF	Susannah Townsend	28 July 1989 (aged 31)	175	12	(England) Canterbury
12	FW	Erica Sanders	18 May 1997 (aged 24)	24	1	(Netherlands) hdm
13	FW	Ellie Rayer	22 November 1996 (aged 24)	53	2	(England) East Grinstead
18	DF	Giselle Ansley	31 March 1992 (aged 29)	160	22	(England) Surbiton
20	DF	Hollie Pearne-Webb (Captain)	19 September 1990 (aged 30)	186	8	(England) Surbiton
22	DF	Lizzie Neal	8 October 1998 (aged 22)	22	2	(England) Loughborough Students
25	GK	Sabbie Heesh	6 December 1991 (aged 29)	20	0	(England) Surbiton
26	MF	Lily Owsley	10 December 1994 (aged 26)	159	34	(England) Hampstead & Westminster
27	FW	Jo Hunter	27 May 1991 (aged 30)	70	4	(England) Buckingham
29	FW	Catherine De Ledesma	24 January 1999 (aged 22)	0	0	(England) Loughborough Students
31	DF	Grace Balsdon	13 April 1993 (aged 28)	76	7	(England) Hampstead & Westminster
33	FW	Izzy Petter	27 June 2000 (aged 20)	28	5	(England) Loughborough Students
38	DF	Fiona Crackles	11 February 2000 (aged 21)	8	0	(England) Durham University

=== Germany ===
Head coach: (Belgium) Xavier Reckinger

Germany announced their final squad on 27 May 2021.

No.	Pos.	Player	Date of birth (age)	Caps	Club
2	MF	Kira Horn	12 February 1995 (aged 26)	31	(Germany) Club an der Alster
3	MF	Amelie Wortmann (Captain)	21 October 1996 (aged 24)	58	(Germany) UHC Hamburg
4	DF	Nike Lorenz	12 March 1997 (aged 24)	115	(Germany) Rot-Weiss Köln
5	MF	Selin Oruz	5 February 1997 (aged 24)	99	(Germany) Düsseldorfer HC
8	MF	Anne Schröder	11 September 1994 (aged 26)	141	(Germany) Club an der Alster
11	FW	Lena Micheel	29 April 1998 (aged 23)	53	(Germany) UHC Hamburg
12	FW	Charlotte Stapenhorst	15 June 1995 (aged 25)	106	(Germany) UHC Hamburg
15	GK	Nathalie Kubalski	3 September 1993 (aged 27)	26	(Germany) Düsseldorfer HC
16	DF	Sonja Zimmermann	15 June 1999 (aged 21)	33	(Germany) Mannheimer HC
18	FW	Lisa Altenburg	23 September 1989 (aged 31)	127	(Germany) Club an der Alster
19	DF	Maike Schaunig	13 March 1996 (aged 25)	44	(Germany) Uhlenhorst Mülheim
20	GK	Julia Sonntag	1 November 1991 (aged 29)	56	(Germany) Rot-Weiss Köln
21	MF	Franzisca Hauke	10 September 1989 (aged 31)	184	(Germany) Harvestehuder THC
22	MF	Cécile Pieper	31 August 1994 (aged 26)	118	(Germany) Rot-Weiss Köln
24	FW	Pia Maertens	6 January 1999 (aged 22)	37	(Germany) Rot-Weiss Köln
25	DF	Viktoria Huse	24 October 1995 (aged 25)	59	(Germany) Club an der Alster
28	FW	Jette Fleschütz	23 October 2002 (aged 18)	6	(Germany) Grosflottbek
30	DF	Hanna Granitzki	31 July 1997 (aged 23)	57	(Germany) Club an der Alster

=== Italy ===
Head coach: Roberto Carta

Italy announced a 20-player squad on 28 May 2021. Their final squad was announced on 4 June 2021.

No.	Pos.	Player	Date of birth (age)	Caps	Club
1	GK	Sofia Monserrat	19 June 1992 (aged 28)	0	(Belgium) Daring
3	DF	Teresa Dalla Vittoria	1 January 1997 (aged 24)	19	(Belgium) White Star
4	DF	Ilaria Sarnari	8 December 1999 (aged 21)	0	(Italy) Libertas San Saba
5	MF	Ailin Oviedo	2 March 1991 (aged 30)	3	(Belgium) Antwerp
9	FW	Emilia Munitis	6 May 1996 (aged 25)	20	(Spain) Real Sociedad
11	MF	Agostina Ayala	25 November 1995 (aged 25)	0	(Spain) Real Sociedad
12	GK	Lucia Caruso	30 September 1997 (aged 23)	0	(Spain) Tenis
13	FW	Agueda Moroni	6 March 1997 (aged 24)	0	(Italy) Argentia
14	FW	Antonella Bruni	4 February 1995 (aged 26)	0	(Belgium) Victory
15	MF	Sofia Maldonando	3 January 1995 (aged 26)	10	(Spain) Real Club de Polo
16	FW	Pilar de Biase	30 October 1996 (aged 24)	5	(Italy) Argentia
17	DF	Chiara Tiddi (Captain)	16 December 1988 (aged 32)	170	(Netherlands) Kampong
18	FW	Federica Carta	21 June 2000 (aged 20)	34	(Italy) Amsicora
19	MF	Eleonora di Mauro	29 November 1988 (aged 32)	75	(Italy) Pol Valverde
20	DF	Constanza Aguirre	27 July 1990 (aged 30)	26	(Italy) Pol Valverde
21	DF	Sara Puglisi	3 August 2000 (aged 20)	17	(Italy) Pisa
24	FW	Luciana Fernandez	20 July 1997 (aged 23)	0	(Italy) Pol Ferrini
25	FW	Pilar De Biase	30 October 1996 (aged 24)	2	(Italy) Argentia
26	MF	Sofia Laurito	10 January 1994 (aged 27)	16	(Belgium) White Star
27	FW	Lara Oviedo	12 April 1988 (aged 33)	38	(Belgium) Gantoise
28	DF	Ivanna Pessina	18 April 1990 (aged 31)	27	(Italy) Amsicora
