= 2021 Women's EuroHockey Club Trophy =

Women's EuroHockey Club Trophy

Tournament details
- Host country: France
- City: Lille
- Dates: 29 September – 3 October
- Teams: 5
- Venue: Lille Métropole Hockey Club

Final positions
- Champions: (Belgium) Gantoise (1st title)
- Runner-up: (Spain) Sanse Complutense
- Third place: (Belgium) Braxgata

Tournament statistics
- Matches played: 10
- Goals scored: 60 (6 per match)
- Top scorer: (Spain) Lola Riera (9 goals)
- Best player: (Belgium) Ambre Ballenghien (Gantoise)

The 2021 Women's EuroHockey Club Trophy was the 44th edition of the women's Women's EuroHockey Club Trophy, Europe's secondary club field hockey tournament organized by the EHF. It was held from 29 September to 3 October 2021 in Lille, France.

Gantoise won the tournament for the first time, finishing atop the standings at the conclusion of the round robin matches. Sanse Complutense and Braxgata finished in second and third place, respectively.

== Teams ==
- (Belgium) Braxgata
- (Belgium) Gantoise
- (England) East Grinstead
- (France) Lille
- (Spain) Sanse Complutense

== Results ==
=== Pool ===
| Pos | Team | Pld | W | D | L | GF | GA | GD | Pts | Final Standings |
|---|---|---|---|---|---|---|---|---|---|---|
| 1 | (Belgium) Gantoise | 4 | 4 | 0 | 0 | 23 | 4 | +19 | 20 | Tournament Champions |
| 2 | (Spain) Sanse Complutense | 4 | 3 | 0 | 1 | 15 | 8 | +7 | 16 | |
| 3 | (Belgium) Braxgata | 4 | 2 | 0 | 2 | 11 | 7 | +4 | 11 | |
| 4 | (England) East Grinstead | 4 | 1 | 0 | 3 | 11 | 17 | −6 | 6 | |
| 5 | (France) Lille (H) | 4 | 0 | 0 | 4 | 0 | 24 | −24 | 0 | |

Source: EHF
Rules for classification: 1) Points; 2) Goal difference; 3) Goals scored; 4) Games won; 5) Head-to-head.
(H) Hosts

=== Fixtures ===
29 September 2021
18:30

| Gantoise (Belgium) | 4–3 | (Spain) Sanse Complutense |
|---|---|---|
| Gerniers 29'; Ballenghien 35'; Roels 40'; Vanden Borre 48' | Report | Riera 19', 39', 51' |

Umpires:
Céline Martin-Schmets (BEL)
Rebecca Woodcock (ENG)

29 September 2021
20:45

| Lille (France) | 0–5 | (Belgium) Braxgata |
|---|---|---|
| | Report | Lo. Hillewaert 11', 27'; Versavel 25', 32'; Laciná 44' |

Umpires:
Sandra Adell (ESP)
Ymkje van Slooten (NED)

30 September 2021
16:30

| East Grinstead (England) | 1–8 | (Belgium) Gantoise |
|---|---|---|
| Bray 7' | Report | Sinia 5'; Oviedo 31'; Vanden Borre 33'; Ballenghien 40', 43', 60'; Gerniers 52'; Nelen 59' |

Umpires:
Ymkje van Slooten (NED)
Anne van den Bosch (BEL)

30 September 2021
19:00

| Braxgata (Belgium) | 1–2 | (Spain) Sanse Complutense |
|---|---|---|
| Pons 55' | Report | Álvarez 14'; Riera 55' |

Umpires:
Rebecca Woodcock (ENG)
Sandra Adell (ESP)

1 October 2021
15:30

| Braxgata (Belgium) | 0–5 | (Belgium) Gantoise |
|---|---|---|
| | Report | Brasseur 7'; Vanden Borre 14'; Ballenghien 16'; Staelens 37'; Schreurs 56' |

Umpires:
Ymkje van Slooten (NED)
Rebecca Woodcock (ENG)

1 October 2021
18:00

| Lille (France) | 0–7 | (England) East Grinstead |
|---|---|---|
| | Report | Rayer 5'; Bray 7', 50', 54'; Westwood 13', 57'; Bowden 60' |

Umpires:
Anne van den Bosch (BEL)
Céline Martin-Schmets (BEL)

2 October 2021
12:30

| Sanse Complutense (Spain) | 4–3 | (England) East Grinstead |
|---|---|---|
| Riera 11', 50'; Álvarez 14', 44' | Report | Rayer 13'; Bray 49'; Fatin 55' |

Umpires:
Céline Martin-Schmets (BEL)
Ymkje van Slooten (NED)

2 October 2021
15:00

| Gantoise (Belgium) | 6–0 | (France) Lille |
|---|---|---|
| Schreurs 10'; Vanden Borre 21'; Gerniers 29'; Sinia 29', 33'; Ballenghien 44' | Report |

Umpires:
Sandra Adell (ESP)
Anne van den Bosch (BEL)

3 October 2021
10:00

| East Grinstead (England) | 0–5 | (Belgium) Braxgata |
|---|---|---|
| | Report | A. Vandermeiren 19', 21', 31'; Versavel 25'; Scheers 34' |

Umpires:
Céline Martin-Schmets (BEL)
Sandra Adell (ESP)

3 October 2021
12:30

| Sanse Complutense (Spain) | 6–0 | (France) Lille |
|---|---|---|
| Álvarez 19'; Riera 23', 41', 51'; Teruggi 29'; Mondo 57' | Report |

Umpires:
Rebecca Woodcock (ENG)
Anne van den Bosch (BEL)

== Awards ==
| Player of the Tournament | Top Goalscorer | Goalkeeper of the Tournament |
|---|---|---|
| (Belgium) Ambre Ballenghien (Gantoise) | (Spain) Lola Riera (Sanse Complutense) | (France) Joséphine Hermant (Lille) |
