= 2020–21 Women's FIH Pro League =

International field hockey competition

- Dates: 11 January 2020 – 27 June 2021
- Teams: 9 (from 4 confederations)

Final positions
- Champions: Netherlands (2nd title)
- Runner-up: Argentina
- Third place: Great Britain

Tournament statistics
- Matches played: 40
- Goals scored: 156 (3.9 per match)
- Top scorer(s): (New Zealand) Olivia Merry (11 goals)

The 2020–21 Women's FIH Pro League was the second season of the Pro League, the premier women's field hockey national team league series. The tournament started in January 2020 and finished in June 2021.

== Format changes ==
The home and away principle was kept but this principle is split over two consecutive seasons from this season onwards and work according to the following example:

- in season 2020-21, Team A will host Team B twice within a couple of days.
- in season 2021-22, Team B will host Team A twice within a couple of days.

If one of the two matches played between two teams is cancelled, the winner of the other match will receive double points.

The grand final will not be played this edition because of the time proximity with the 2020 Olympic Games.

== Coronavirus pandemic interruption ==
Due to the outbreak COVID-19 pandemic in China, the FIH decided in late January to put on hold the matches between China and Belgium, initially scheduled on 8 and 9 February in Changzhou. For the rest of the upcoming matches in China, the FIH monitored the evolution of the situation closely and following the recommendations of the World Health Organization applied in early February the same measures for the matches scheduled on 14 and 15 March against Australia, Meanwhile, it was evaluated the possibility for China to play these and their other matches on hold in alternative locations.

In the wake of the COVID-19 pandemic outbreak in Europe, Hockey Australia decided to suspend all international travels for its national teams until further notice in early March. The matches against Germany and Netherlands, scheduled on 21 and 22 and 26 and 29 March respectively, were postponed. Later Hockey New Zealand took the same decision, postponing their matches scheduled on 19 and 22 March against Netherlands and on 28 and 29 March against Germany.

Once declared as a pandemic on 11 March, the FIH and all participating National Associations involved in the competition decided to put all the matches scheduled until 15 April on hold. Furthermore, it was agreed that the current edition is maintained, no matches will be played after the Olympic Games and depending on the evolution of the situation and the decisions of the public authorities, every match which can be organized between late April and before the Olympics, shall be played. On 19 March, it was announced by the FIH that all the matches scheduled to play until 17 May were put on hold.

On 24 April, it was announced that the competition is extended until June 2021. The restart for September 2020, was announced on 9 July. Because not all matches are due to be played before the end of the season, the final ranking will be determined by points percentage instead of total points.

On 28 May, it was announced that despite the efforts of the involved federations, the matches set to play before the announcing date were going to be the last of the edition.

== Teams ==
Nine teams competed in a round-robin tournament, being played from January to June.

- Argentina (3)
- Australia (2)
- Belgium (12)
- China (10)
- Germany (4)
- Great Britain (5)
- Netherlands (1)
- New Zealand (6)
- United States (13)

== Results ==
=== Standings ===
Pos	Team	Pld	W	SOW	SOL	L	GF	GA	GD	PCT
1st place, gold medalist(s)	Netherlands (C)	12	10	1	0	1	35	7	+28	.889
2nd place, silver medalist(s)	Argentina	10	5	2	0	3	24	15	+9	.633
3rd place, bronze medalist(s)	Great Britain	12	5	2	1	4	24	14	+10	.556
4	Germany	8	4	0	1	3	12	11	+1	.542
5	Australia	8	3	1	2	2	11	12	−1	.542
6	New Zealand	10	4	1	2	3	22	19	+3	.533
7	Belgium	12	3	1	2	6	19	25	−6	.361
8	China	2	0	0	0	2	2	7	−5	.000
9	United States	10	0	0	0	10	7	46	−39	.000

Source: FIH
Rules for classification: 1) points; 2) matches won; 3) goal difference; 4) goals for; 5) head-to-head result; 6) field goals scored.
(C) Champion

All times are local.

=== Fixtures ===
11 January 2020
14:00

China	0–3	Netherlands
	Report	Zerbo 8', 40'; Leurink 31'

Wujin Hockey Stadium, Changzhou
Umpires:
Kang Hyun-young (KOR)
Junko Wagatsuma (JPN)

12 January 2020
14:00

China	2–4	Netherlands
Peng 30'; Chen Yi 54'	Report	Nunnink 6'; Keetels 23'; Welten 36'; Matla 47'

Wujin Hockey Stadium, Changzhou
Umpires:
Amber Church (NZL)
Kang Hyun-young (KOR)

25 January 2020
14:00

United States	Cancelled	Netherlands
	Report

Karen Shelton Stadium, Chapel Hill

As a mark of respect for United States manager Larry Amar, who died that week whilst with the team, their first match of the FIH Pro League was cancelled. In accordance with the League's regulations for a cancelled match, the points of the second match count double.

25 January 2020
16:00

Australia	3–3	Belgium
Malone 21'; Bone 59'; Commerford 60'	Report	Versavel 33'; Englebert 45'; Nelen 55'
Penalties
Peris (penalty shoot-out scored); Nobbs (penalty shoot-out missed); Malone (penalty shoot-out scored); Lawton (penalty shoot-out scored); Claxton (penalty shoot-out scored)	4–2	(penalty shoot-out missed) Ballenghien; (penalty shoot-out scored) Rasir; (penalty shoot-out scored) Raye; (penalty shoot-out missed) Englebert

Sydney Olympic Park, Sydney
Umpires:
Amber Church (NZL)
Michelle Joubert (RSA)

26 January 2020
14:00

United States	0–9	Netherlands
	Report	Albers 6', 43', 53'; Matla 22'; Welten 40', 50', 55'; Zerbo 56'; Verschoor 59'

Karen Shelton Stadium, Chapel Hill
Umpires:
Catalina Montesino (CHI)
Irene Presenqui (ARG)

26 January 2020
15:00

Australia	1–1	Belgium
Nance 45'	Report	Duquesne 47'
Penalties
Stewart (penalty shoot-out missed); Nance (penalty shoot-out missed); Kershaw (penalty shoot-out missed); Kenny (penalty shoot-out scored)	1–3	(penalty shoot-out scored) Versavel; (penalty shoot-out missed) Ballenghien; (penalty shoot-out missed) Raye; (penalty shoot-out scored) Duquesne; (penalty shoot-out scored) Nelen

Sydney Olympic Park, Sydney
Umpires:
Amber Church (NZL)
Michelle Joubert (RSA)

1 February 2020
17:00

New Zealand	1–2	Belgium
McCaw 17'	Report	Ballenghien 2'; Weyns 51'

North Harbour Hockey Stadium, Auckland
Umpires:
Steve Rogers (AUS)
Wanri Venter (RSA)

1 February 2020
18:30

Australia	2–1	Great Britain
Kershaw 26'; Stewart 60'	Report	Robertson 18'

Sydney Olympic Park, Sydney
Umpires:
Kelly Hudson (NZL)
Emi Yamada (JPN)

2 February 2020
15:00

New Zealand	4–1	Belgium
Merry 31', 35', 51', 55'	Report	Raye 7'

North Harbour Hockey Stadium, Auckland
Umpires:
Wanri Venter (RSA)
Aleisha Neumann (AUS)

2 February 2020
17:30

Australia	Cancelled	Great Britain
	Report	Toman 17'

Sydney Olympic Park, Sydney
Umpires:
Emi Yamada (JPN)
Kelly Hudson (NZL)

Game was abandoned at half time due to heavy rain and thunderstorms when Great Britain was leading 1–0. In accordance with the League's regulations for a cancelled match, the points of the first match count double.

7 February 2020
18:00

Argentina	6–2	United States
Jankunas 3'; Merino 23'; Gorzelany 33'; Luchetti 37'; Sánchez Moccia 57'; Rebecchi 60'	Report	Hoffman 24'; West 50'

CeNARD, Buenos Aires
Umpires:
Catalina Montesino (CHI)
Ayanna McClean (TTO)

8 February 2020
18:00

Argentina	6–1	United States
Gorzelany 1'; Merino 8', 60'; Rebecchi 13'; Barrionuevo 40', 53'	Report	West 28'

CeNARD, Buenos Aires
Umpires:
Ayanna McClean (TTO)
Catalina Montesino (CHI)

8 February 2020
19:30

New Zealand	0–3	Great Britain
	Report	Howard 9'; Watson 21'; McCallin 50'

North Harbour Hockey Stadium, Auckland
Umpires:
Irene Presenqui (ARG)
Aleisha Neumann (AUS)

9 February 2020
17:30

New Zealand	2–2	Great Britain
Shannon 28', 53'	Report	Toman 38'; Balsdon 42'
Penalties
Shannon (penalty shoot-out scored); Charlton (penalty shoot-out missed); Merry (penalty shoot-out scored); Ralph (penalty shoot-out scored); Michelsen (penalty shoot-out scored); Michelsen (penalty shoot-out missed)	4–5	(penalty shoot-out scored) Howard; (penalty shoot-out scored) Owsley; (penalty shoot-out scored) Martin; (penalty shoot-out scored) Robertson; (penalty shoot-out missed) Toman; (penalty shoot-out scored) Howard

North Harbour Hockey Stadium, Auckland
Umpires:
Aleisha Neumann (AUS)
Irene Presenqui (ARG)

15 February 2020
17:00

New Zealand	3–1	United States
Merry 13'; Shannon 22'; Keddell 33'	Report	Campbell 44'

Ngā Puna Wai Sports Hub, Christchurch
Umpires:
Junko Wagatsuma (JPN)
Annelize Rostron (RSA)

15 February 2020
20:30

Argentina	2–0	Netherlands
Gorzelany 35'; Merino 57'	Report

CeNARD, Buenos Aires
Umpires:
Maggie Giddens (USA)
Michelle Meister (GER)

16 February 2020
15:00

Argentina	1–3	Netherlands
Gorzelany 18'	Report	Matla 30+'; Jansen 42'; Fortuin 60'

CeNARD, Buenos Aires
Umpires:
Michelle Meister (GER)
Maggie Giddens (USA)

16 February 2020
20:30

New Zealand	3–1	United States
Merry 16'; Michelsen 38'; Jaques 54'	Report	Grega 47'

Ngā Puna Wai Sports Hub, Christchurch
Umpires:
Annelize Rostron (RSA)
Junko Wagatsuma (JPN)

28 February 2020
20:00

New Zealand	1–1	Argentina
Ralph 19'	Report	Albertario 37'
Penalties
Shannon (penalty shoot-out missed); Charlton (penalty shoot-out scored); Merry (penalty shoot-out missed); Ralph (penalty shoot-out missed)	1–3	(penalty shoot-out scored) Jankunas; (penalty shoot-out scored) Miranda; (penalty shoot-out missed) Albertario; (penalty shoot-out missed) M. Granatto; (penalty shoot-out scored) Jardel

Ngā Puna Wai Sports Hub, Christchurch
Umpires:
Aleisha Neumann (AUS)
Liu Xiaoying (CHN)

1 March 2020
17:30

New Zealand	5–3	Argentina
Merry 3', 11', 13', 54'; Ralph 47'	Report	M. Granatto 26', 31'; Gorzelany 48'

Ngā Puna Wai Sports Hub, Christchurch
Umpires:
Junko Wagatsuma (JPN)
Aleisha Neumann (AUS)

6 March 2020
18:00

Australia	0–2	Argentina
	Report	Jankunas 14'; Gorzelany 48'

Perth Hockey Stadium, Perth
Umpires:
Amber Church (NZL)
Kelly Hudson (NZL)

7 March 2020
16:00

Australia	0–2	Argentina
	Report	V. Granatto 25'; Toccalino 59'

Perth Hockey Stadium, Perth
Umpires:
Amber Church (NZL)
Kelly Hudson (NZL)

22 September 2020
18:00

Germany	2–0	Belgium
Heyn 36'; Micheel 47'	Report

Düsseldorfer HC, Düsseldorf
Umpires:
Alison Leogh (IRL)
Sarah Wilson (SCO)

23 September 2020
15:30

Germany	3–1	Belgium
Gablać 24'; Pieper 33'; Grote 46'	Report	Ballenghien 21'

Düsseldorfer HC, Düsseldorf
Umpires:
Sarah Wilson (SCO)
Alison Leogh (IRL)

27 October 2020
16:30

Netherlands	1–1	Great Britain
Dicke 2'	Report	Hunter 43'
Penalties
Sanders (penalty shoot-out scored); De Waard (penalty shoot-out scored); Welten (penalty shoot-out scored); Van Geffen (penalty shoot-out missed)	3–1	(penalty shoot-out scored) Rayer; (penalty shoot-out missed) Howard; (penalty shoot-out missed) Owsley; (penalty shoot-out missed) Petter

Wagener Stadium, Amstelveen
Umpires:
Jonas van 't Hek (NED)
Céline Martin-Schmets (BEL)

29 October 2020
16:30

Netherlands	3–0	Great Britain
Van Maasakker 2'; Matla 26'; De Goede 46'	Report

Wagener Stadium, Amstelveen
Umpires:
Céline Martin-Schmets (BEL)
Coen van Bunge (NED)

31 October 2020
14:00

Belgium	1–1	Great Britain
Duquesne 30'	Report	Jones 11'
Penalties
Versavel (penalty shoot-out missed); S. Vanden Borre (penalty shoot-out missed); Duquesne (penalty shoot-out scored); Raye (penalty shoot-out missed)	1–3	(penalty shoot-out scored) Owsley; (penalty shoot-out missed) Toman; (penalty shoot-out scored) Robertson; (penalty shoot-out scored) Howard

Royal Uccle Sport, Brussels
Umpires:
Jonas van 't Hek (NED)
Céline Martin-Schmets (BEL)

1 November 2020
14:00

Belgium	1–2	Great Britain
Nelen 16'	Report	Owsley 14'; Robertson 45+'

Royal Uccle Sport, Brussels
Umpires:
Céline Martin-Schmets (BEL)
Coen van Bunge (NED)

4 November 2020
15:30

Belgium	0–4	Netherlands
	Report	Welten 27'; Matla 31'; Stam 36'; Van Geffen 36'

Royal Uccle Sport, Brussels
Umpires:
Céline Martin-Schmets (BEL)
Jonas van 't Hek (NED)

6 March 2021
14:00

Netherlands	2–1	Germany
Matla 35'; Van den Assem 40'	Report	Altenburg 12'

Wagener Stadium, Amstelveen
Umpires:
Céline Martin-Schmets (BEL)
Jonas van 't Hek (NED)

7 March 2021
14:00

Netherlands	3–0	Germany
Dicke 2'; Welten 34', 36'	Report

Wagener Stadium, Amstelveen
Umpires:
Céline Martin-Schmets (BEL)
Coen van Bunge (NED)

3 April 2021
17:00

Argentina	0–0	Germany
	Report
Penalties
Forcherio (penalty shoot-out scored); Albertario (penalty shoot-out scored); V. Granatto (penalty shoot-out missed); Jankunas (penalty shoot-out missed); Merino (penalty shoot-out scored)	3–2	(penalty shoot-out missed) Zimmermann; (penalty shoot-out missed) Oruz; (penalty shoot-out missed) Lorenz; (penalty shoot-out scored) Pieper; (penalty shoot-out scored) Maertens

CeNARD, Buenos Aires
Umpires:
Irene Presenqui (ARG)
Carolina de la Fuente (ARG)

4 April 2021
17:00

Argentina	1–3	Germany
Gorzelany 51'	Report	Stapenhorst 3'; Heinz 24'; Maertens 31'

CeNARD, Buenos Aires
Umpires:
Carolina de la Fuente (ARG)
Irene Presenqui (ARG)

12 May 2021 (Note: The matches, originally scheduled for 14 and 15 November 2020, were postponed by the request of the German team.)
20:00

Great Britain	2–3	Germany
Robertson 11'; Townsend 32'	Report	Fleschütz 14'; Micheel 41'; Stapenhorst 57'

Lee Valley Hockey and Tennis Centre, London
Umpires:
Sarah Wilson (SCO)
Hannah Harrison (ENG)

13 May 2021
20:00

Great Britain	2–0	Germany
Toman 23'; Townsend 30'	Report

Lee Valley Hockey and Tennis Centre, London
Umpires:
Hannah Harrison (ENG)
Sarah Wilson (SCO)

15 May 2021
17:30

Belgium	3–0	United States
Raye 17', 58'; Duquesne 33'	Report

Wilrijkse Plein, Antwerp
Umpires:
Laurine Delforge (BEL)
Céline Martin-Schmets (BEL)

16 May 2021
17:30

Belgium	6–1	United States
Ballenghien 16', 31'; S. Vanden Borre 23', 34'; Ikegwuonu 24'; Breyne 35'	Report	Gonzales 54'

Wilrijkse Plein, Antwerp
Umpires:
Michelle Meister (GER)
Laurine Delforge (BEL)

22 May 2021
15:30

Great Britain	5–1	United States
Petter 15', 30'; Robertson 37'; Toman 41'; Rayer 50'	Report	Briddell 57'

Lee Valley Hockey and Tennis Centre, London
Umpires:
Sarah Wilson (SCO)
Alison Keogh (IRL)

23 May 2021
14:30

Great Britain	5–0	United States
Balsdon 2'; Ansley 15'; Haycroft 16'; Robertson 48'; Jones 52'	Report

Lee Valley Hockey and Tennis Centre, London
Umpires:
Alison Keogh (IRL)
Sarah Wilson (SCO)

30 May 2021
14:00

Belgium	0–3	Netherlands
	Report	Keetels 9'; Matla 39'; Van Maasakker 40'

Wilrijkse Plein, Antwerp
Umpires:
Laurine Delforge (BEL)
Céline Martin-Schmets (BEL)

26 June 2021 (Note: The matches, scheduled for 24 and 25 April were postponed.)
15:00

Australia	2–2	New Zealand
Malone 4'; Chalker 5'	Report	Michelsen 11'; Ralph 36'
Penalties
S. Fitzpatrick (penalty shoot-out missed); Lawton (penalty shoot-out missed); Nobbs (penalty shoot-out missed); Peris (penalty shoot-out missed)	0–2	(penalty shoot-out missed) Shannon; (penalty shoot-out missed) Merry; (penalty shoot-out missed) Keddell; (penalty shoot-out scored) Charlton; (penalty shoot-out scored) King

Perth Hockey Stadium, Perth
Umpires:
Kelly Hudson (NZL)
Aleisha Neumann (AUS)

27 June 2021
15:00

Australia	3–1	New Zealand
S. Fitzpatrick 16'; Squibb 34'; Williams 57'	Report	Merry 4'

Perth Hockey Stadium, Perth
Umpires:
Aleisha Neumann (AUS)
Kelly Hudson (NZL)

China	Cancelled (Note: The matches could not be rescheduled and were cancelled.)	Belgium
	Report

China	Cancelled	Belgium
	Report

United States	Cancelled	Australia
	Report

United States	Cancelled	Australia
	Report

United States	Cancelled	Germany
	Report

Argentina	Cancelled	China
	Report

United States	Cancelled	Germany
	Report

Argentina	Cancelled	China
	Report

United States	Cancelled	China
	Report

United States	Cancelled	China
	Report

Germany	Cancelled	China
	Report

Germany	Cancelled	China
	Report

Great Britain	Cancelled	China
	Report

Great Britain	Cancelled	China
	Report

Great Britain	Cancelled	Argentina
	Report

China	Cancelled	Australia
	Report

Great Britain	Cancelled	Argentina
	Report

China	Cancelled	Australia
	Report

Netherlands	Cancelled	New Zealand
	Report

Netherlands	Cancelled	New Zealand
	Report

Germany	Cancelled	New Zealand
	Report

Germany	Cancelled	New Zealand
	Report

Belgium	Cancelled	Argentina
	Report

Belgium	Cancelled	Argentina
	Report

Netherlands	Cancelled	Australia
	Report

Netherlands	Cancelled	Australia
	Report

Germany	Cancelled	Australia
	Report

China	Cancelled	New Zealand
	Report

Germany	Cancelled	Australia
	Report

China	Cancelled	New Zealand
	Report

== Goalscorers ==
There were 156 goals scored in 40 matches, for an average of 3.9 goals per match.

11 goals

- (New Zealand) Olivia Merry

7 goals

- (Argentina) Agustina Gorzelany
- (Netherlands) Frédérique Matla
- (Netherlands) Lidewij Welten

6 goals

- (United Kingdom) Sarah Robertson

4 goals

- (Argentina) Delfina Merino
- (Belgium) Ambre Ballenghien

3 goals

- (Belgium) Tiphaine Duquesne
- (Belgium) Abigail Raye
- (United Kingdom) Anna Toman
- (Netherlands) Felice Albers
- (Netherlands) Ginella Zerbo
- (New Zealand) Hope Ralph
- (New Zealand) Olivia Shannon

2 goals

- (Argentina) Noel Barrionuevo
- (Argentina) María José Granatto
- (Argentina) Julieta Jankunas
- (Argentina) Carla Rebecchi
- (Australia) Ambrosia Malone
- (Belgium) Barbara Nelen
- (Belgium) Stephanie Vanden Borre
- (Germany) Lena Micheel
- (Germany) Charlotte Stapenhorst
- (United Kingdom) Grace Balsdon
- (United Kingdom) Sarah Jones
- (United Kingdom) Isabelle Petter
- (United Kingdom) Susannah Townsend
- (Netherlands) Pien Dicke
- (Netherlands) Marloes Keetels
- (Netherlands) Caia van Maasakker
- (New Zealand) Stacey Michelsen
- (United States) Taylor West

1 goal

- (Argentina) Agustina Albertario
- (Argentina) Victoria Granatto
- (Argentina) Rosario Luchetti
- (Argentina) Rocío Sánchez Moccia
- (Argentina) Sofía Toccalino
- (Australia) Edwina Bone
- (Australia) Emily Chalker
- (Australia) Kalindi Commerford
- (Australia) Savannah Fitzpatrick
- (Australia) Stephanie Kershaw
- (Australia) Gabrielle Nance
- (Australia) Penny Squibb
- (Australia) Grace Stewart
- (Australia) Mariah Williams
- (Belgium) Lucie Breyne
- (Belgium) Charlotte Englebert
- (Belgium) Shaunda Ikegwuonu
- (Belgium) Louise Versavel
- (Belgium) Anne-Sophie Weyns
- (China) Peng Yang
- (China) Chen Yi
- (Germany) Lisa Altenburg
- (Germany) Jette Fleschütz
- (Germany) Hannah Gablać
- (Germany) Rebecca Grote
- (Germany) Pauline Heinz
- (Germany) Naomi Heyn
- (Germany) Pia Maertens
- (Germany) Cécile Pieper
- (United Kingdom) Giselle Ansley
- (United Kingdom) Sarah Haycroft
- (United Kingdom) Tessa Howard
- (United Kingdom) Jo Hunter
- (United Kingdom) Shona McCallin
- (United Kingdom) Lily Owsley
- (United Kingdom) Elena Rayer
- (United Kingdom) Charlotte Watson
- (Netherlands) Ireen van den Assem
- (Netherlands) Kyra Fortuin
- (Netherlands) Margot van Geffen
- (Netherlands) Eva de Goede
- (Netherlands) Yibbi Jansen
- (Netherlands) Laurien Leurink
- (Netherlands) Laura Nunnink
- (Netherlands) Lauren Stam
- (Netherlands) Maria Verschoor
- (New Zealand) Alia Jaques
- (New Zealand) Rose Keddell
- (New Zealand) Gemma McCaw
- (United States) Kelsey Briddell
- (United States) Ali Campbell
- (United States) Linnea Gonzales
- (United States) Danielle Grega
- (United States) Ashley Hoffman

Source: FIH

== See also ==
- 2020–21 Men's FIH Pro League
