= La Gantoise HC =

Belgian field hockey club

Gantoise
- Full name: La Gantoise HC
- League: Men's Hockey League; Women's Hockey League
- Founded: 1864; 162 years ago
- Home ground: La Gantoise HC, Ghent
- Website: Club website
Home	Away

La Gantoise HC, also known as Gantoise, is a Belgian professional sports club based in Ghent. The club is most well known for its field hockey section, with both the first men's and women's teams playing in the Belgian Hockey League.

The Gantoise women are the current title holders in the Belgian Hockey League, as well as the EuroHockey Club Trophy.

== History ==
While La Gantoise was originally founded in 1864, the hockey section was not formed until 1914.

The first edition of the Belgian Hockey League, known simply as 'The Championship' at the time, was held following the conclusion of World War One. La Gantoise finished in fourth place, and they won the following year.

At the club's 100th anniversary, in 1964, La Gantoise had 150 members, forming 10 teams.

The club continued to grow, eventually forming women's teams, who reached the top level of Belgian hockey in 2003. Three years later, in 2006, the women's first team reached a pinnacle by becoming champions of Belgium for the first time.

The second field at La Gantoise is named after Yves Bernaert, one of Belgium's most prolific former international players.

In the 2024-25 Men's Euro Hockey League Gantoise won their first title by beating HC Bloemendaal in the final 5-2

== Honours ==
=== Men ===
Belgian Hockey League

- Winners (4): 1920–21, 2022–23, 2023–24, 2024–25

Belgian Cup

- Winners (1): 2025–26

Euro Hockey League

- Winners (1): 2024–25
- Runners-up (1): 2025–26

=== Women ===
Belgian Hockey League

- Winners (7): 2005–06, 2008–09, 2020–21, 2021–22, 2022–23, 2023–24, 2025–26

EuroHockey Club Trophy

- Winners (1): 2021

== Current squads ==
=== Men ===
As of 2021–22

Head coach: Pascal Kina

No.	Pos.	Nation	Player
1	GK	ARG	Tomás Santiago
2	DF	NED	Pepijn Scheen
4	GK	CAN	David Vandenbossche
6	DF	ENG	Jack Waller
7	FW	BEL	Guillaume Hellin
9	FW	FRA	Blaise Rogeau
11	DF	FRA	Maxime Deplus
12	MF	ARG	Agustín Bugallo
13	DF	FRA	Mattéo Desgouillons

No.	Pos.	Nation	Player
14	MF	BEL	Alexandre de Paeuw
15	MF	FRA	François Goyet
18	DF	BEL	Thibault Deplus
21	FW	FRA	Ètienne Tynevez
22	FW	BEL	Arthur de Borrekens
24	MF	BEL	Antoine Kina (Captain)
32	FW	ARG	Martín Ferreiro
33	MF	FRA	Charles Masson

=== Women ===
As of 2021–22

Head coach: Kevan DeMartinis

No.	Pos.	Nation	Player
1	GK	BEL	Pauline de Ryck
2	DF	BEL	Marie Groffils
3	MF	BEL	Hélène Brasseur
6	DF	BEL	Marina Makhotkin
9	MF	BEL	Anne-Sophie Roels
10	FW	BEL	Emilie Sinia
11	MF	ITA	Lara Oviedo
12	FW	BEL	Juliette Staelens

No.	Pos.	Nation	Player
13	MF	BEL	Alix Gerniers (Captain)
15	DF	BEL	Anne-Sophie Vanden Borre
16	FW	BEL	Noa Schreurs
17	DF	FRA	Delfina Gaspari
18	FW	BEL	Astrid Calloens
19	MF	BEL	Barbara Nelen
22	DF	BEL	Stéphanie Vanden Borre
30	FW	BEL	Ambre Ballenghien
