= 2008–09 Euro Hockey League =

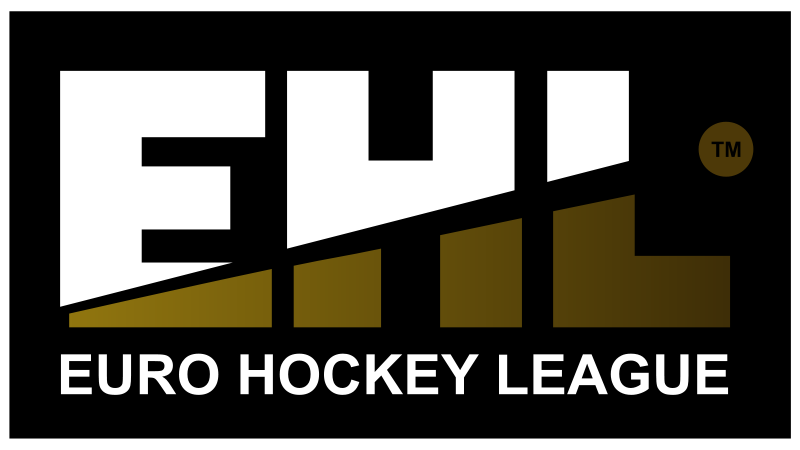

Tournament details
- Host countries: France; Germany; Netherlands
- Dates: 24 October 2008 – 31 May 2009
- Teams: 24 (from 12 associations)
- Venue: 4 (in 4 host cities)

Final positions
- Champions: (Netherlands) Bloemendaal (1st title)
- Runner-up: (Germany) UHC Hamburg
- Third place: (Netherlands) Rotterdam

Tournament statistics
- Matches played: 40
- Goals scored: 211 (5.28 per match)
- Top scorer: Guillermo Schickendantz (Club Egara) (11 goals)
- Best player: Teun de Nooijer (Bloemendaal)

The 2008–09 Euro Hockey League was the second season of the Euro Hockey League, Europe's premier club field hockey tournament organised by the EHF.

The final was played between UHC Hamburg and Bloemendaal at the Hazelaarweg Stadion in Rotterdam, Netherlands. Bloemendaal beat UHC Hamburg, the defending champions, 5–4 to win their first Euro Hockey League title. Rotterdam took the bronze medal.

== Association team allocation ==
Location of teams in 2008–09 Euro Hockey League.
Pink: Group A; Green: Group B; Deep Pink: Group C; Yellow: Group D;
Red: Group E; Cyan: Group F; Blue: Group G; Purple: Group H
Location of Benelux teams in 2008–09 Euro Hockey League

=== Association ranking ===
Rank	Change	Association	Teams
1	Steady	Netherlands	3
2	Steady	Spain	3
3	▲1	England	3
4	▼1	Germany	3
5	▲4	France	2
6	▼1	Poland	2
7	▼1	Belgium	2
8	Steady	Scotland	2
9	▼2	Russia	1
10	Steady	Ireland	1
11	New entry	Ukraine	1
12	New entry	Italy	1

=== Teams ===
Champions
(Netherlands) Bloemendaal	(France) Saint Germain	(Russia) Dinamo Kazan
(Spain) Real Club de Polo	(Poland) Grunwald Poznań	(Ireland) Three Rock Rovers
(England) Reading	(Belgium) Leuven	(Ukraine) Olimpia Kolos Sekvoia
(Germany) Club an der Alster	(Scotland) Kelburne	(Italy) Bra
Runners-up		Third placed
(Netherlands) Amsterdam	(France) Lille	(Netherlands) Rotterdam
(Spain) Atlètic Terrassa	(Poland) Pocztowiec Poznań	(Spain) Club Egara
(England) East Grinstead	(Belgium) Waterloo Ducks	(England) Cannock
(Germany) Düsseldorfer HC	(Scotland) Western Wildcats	(Germany) UHC Hamburg

== Round one ==
Pools A, B, C and D were played in Amstelveen, the Netherlands between 24 and 26 October 2008 and the other four pools were played in Lille, France. If a team won, it received 5 points. A draw gave both teams 2 points. A loss gave the losing team 1 point unless the losing team lost by 3 or more goals, in which case they received 0 points.

=== Pool A ===
Pos	Team	Pld	W	D	L	GF	GA	GD	Pts	Qualification
1	(Spain) Club Egara	2	2	0	0	12	1	+11	10	Advance to knockout stage
2	(Germany) Club an der Alster	2	1	0	1	3	4	−1	5	Advance to knockout stage
3	(Poland) Pocztowiec Poznań	2	0	0	2	1	11	−10	0	

Source: EHF

24 October 2008
14:30

Pocztowiec Poznań (Poland)	0–3	(Germany) Club an der Alster
	Report	Sahmel 5'; O. Hentschel 27'; Sonnenschein 37'

Wagener Stadium, Amstelveen
Umpires:
Thomas Dumon (BEL)
John Heron (SCO)

25 October 2008
10:30

Club Egara (Spain)	8–1	(Poland) Pocztowiec Poznań
Carrera 5', 7'; Amat 19', 48'; Clapes 23'; Schickendantz 34', 50', 62'	Report	Juszczak 45'

Wagener Stadium, Amstelveen
Umpires:
Andrew Kennedy (ENG)
Francesco Parisi (ITA)

26 October 2008
10:30

Club an der Alster (Germany)	0–4	(Spain) Club Egara
	Report	Schickendantz 10', 30', 52'; Arbos 20'

Wagener Stadium, Amstelveen
Umpires:
Colin Hutchinson (IRL)
Bart de Liefde (NED)

=== Pool B ===
Pos	Team	Pld	W	D	L	GF	GA	GD	Pts	Qualification
1	(Germany) Düsseldorfer HC	2	1	1	0	7	5	+2	7	Advance to knockout stage
2	(France) Saint Germain	2	1	1	0	6	4	+2	7	Advance to knockout stage
3	(Italy) Bra	2	0	0	2	3	7	−4	2	

Source: EHF

24 October 2008
20:30

Bra (Italy)	1–3	(France) Saint Germain
M. Lanzano 52'	Report	Coty 8', 56'; Pauchet 33'

Wagener Stadium, Amstelveen
Umpires:
Bjorn Bachmann (GER)
Nathan Stagno (GIB)

25 October 2008
16:30

Düsseldorfer HC (Germany)	4–2	(Italy) Bra
Schröter 13'; Simon 21', 53'; Markert 46'	Report	M. Lanzano 27'; Kanwalpreet 69'

Wagener Stadium, Amstelveen
Umpires:
Bart de Liefde (NED)
Marcelo Servetto (ESP)

26 October 2008
16:30

Saint Germain (France)	3–3	(Germany) Düsseldorfer HC
Pauchet 4', 8'; H. Genestet 53'	Report	Giese 18'; Schröter 67', 70'

Wagener Stadium, Amstelveen
Umpires:
Francesco Parisi (ITA)
John Heron (SCO)

=== Pool C ===
Pos	Team	Pld	W	D	L	GF	GA	GD	Pts	Qualification
1	(Netherlands) Amsterdam (H)	2	2	0	0	16	1	+15	10	Advance to knockout stage
2	(Poland) Grunwald Poznań	2	1	0	1	6	10	−4	5	Advance to knockout stage
3	(Ukraine) Olimpia Kolos Sekvoia	2	0	0	2	2	13	−11	0	

Source: EHF
(H) Hosts

24 October 2008
18:30

Olimpia Kolos Sekvoia (Ukraine)	2–5	(Poland) Grunwald Poznań
Ozerskyi 19'; Buriatynskyi 68'	Report	Mikula 10', 66'; Strykowski 19'; Dutkiewicz 51', 61'

Wagener Stadium, Amstelveen
Umpires:
Colin Hutchinson (IRL)
Bart de Liefde (NED)

25 October 2008
14:30

Grunwald Poznań (Poland)	1–8	(Netherlands) Amsterdam
Dutkiewicz 31'	Report	Hoyng 14'; Taekema 17', 33'; Verga 43'; Freixa 52', 53'; Bakker 57'; Bomans 66'

Wagener Stadium, Amstelveen
Umpires:
Thomas Dumon (BEL)
Nathan Stagno (GIB)

26 October 2008
12:30

Amsterdam (Netherlands)	8–0	(Ukraine) Olimpia Kolos Sekvoia
Freixa 1', 26', 59'; Prins 9'; Buissant 35'; Derikx 44'; Taekema 46', 63'	Report

Wagener Stadium, Amstelveen
Umpires:
Bjorn Bachmann (GER)
Andrew Kennedy (ENG)

=== Pool D ===
Pos	Team	Pld	W	D	L	GF	GA	GD	Pts	Qualification
1	(Netherlands) Bloemendaal	2	2	0	0	13	3	+10	10	Advance to knockout stage
2	(England) Cannock	2	1	0	1	7	9	−2	5	Advance to knockout stage
3	(Russia) Dinamo Kazan	2	0	0	2	5	13	−8	1	

Source: EHF

24 October 2008
16:30

Cannock (England)	5–4	(Russia) Dinamo Kazan
Lane 14', 61'; Taylor 18'; Andrew 34'; Pearce 69'	Report	A. Gevorkyan 5'; Kisialevich 9'; Warsi 20', 50'

Wagener Stadium, Amstelveen
Umpires:
Francesco Parisi (ITA)
Marcelo Servetto (ESP)

25 October 2008
12:30

Dinamo Kazan (Russia)	1–8	(Netherlands) Bloemendaal
Maiorov 56'	Report	O. Meijer 2', 7'; Dwyer 9', 32'; De Nooijer 19'; Brouwer 44', 45', 68'

Wagener Stadium, Amstelveen
Umpires:
Bjorn Bachmann (GER)
Colin Hutchinson (IRL)

26 October 2008
14:30

Bloemendaal (Netherlands)	5–2	(England) Cannock
Docherty 20'; Van Mierlo 34', 56'; Brouwer 41'; O. Meijer 60'	Report	Lane 11', 61'

Wagener Stadium, Amstelveen
Umpires:
Marcelo Servetto (ESP)
Nathan Stagno (GIB)

=== Pool E ===
Pos	Team	Pld	W	D	L	GF	GA	GD	Pts	Qualification
1	(Netherlands) Rotterdam	2	2	0	0	7	1	+6	10	Advance to knockout stage
2	(England) Reading	2	1	0	1	3	2	+1	6	Advance to knockout stage
3	(Scotland) Western Wildcats	2	0	0	2	0	7	−7	1	

Source: EHF

31 October 2008
18:30

Western Wildcats (Scotland)	0–2	(England) Reading
	Report	Smith 7'; Mantell 12'

Stade de la reu Henri Delescaux, Lille
Umpires:
Francisco Vazquez Lopez (ESP)
Marc Knulle (FRA)

1 November 2008
14:30

Rotterdam (Netherlands)	5–0	(Scotland) Western Wildcats
Child 2', 14', 16'; J. Hertzberger 7'; Taylor 62'	Report

Stade de la reu Henri Delescaux, Lille
Umpires:
Geoff Conn (IRL)
Will Drury (FRA)

2 November 2008
14:30

Reading (England)	1–2	(Netherlands) Rotterdam
Watts 47'	Report	Child 3'; Burrows 41'

Stade de la reu Henri Delescaux, Lille
Umpires:
Marcin Grochal (POL)
Francisco Vazquez Lopez (ESP)

=== Pool F ===
Pos	Team	Pld	W	D	L	GF	GA	GD	Pts	Qualification
1	(England) East Grinstead	2	2	0	0	6	2	+4	10	Advance to knockout stage
2	(Belgium) Waterloo Ducks	2	1	0	1	6	4	+2	6	Advance to knockout stage
3	(Scotland) Kelburne	2	0	0	2	1	7	−6	0	

Source: EHF

31 October 2008
14:30

Waterloo Ducks (Belgium)	4–1	(Scotland) Kelburne
Brooke 40'; T. De Saedeleer 49', 57'; Muylaert 58'	Report	Bain 8'

Stade de la reu Henri Delescaux, Lille
Umpires:
Rob ten Cate (NED)
Geoff Conn (IRL)

1 November 2008
10:30

East Grinstead (England)	3–2	(Belgium) Waterloo Ducks
Häner 22'; Hall 57'; Cresswell 59'	Report	X. De Greve 16'; Garreta 42'

Stade de la reu Henri Delescaux, Lille
Umpires:
Francisco Vazquez Lopez (ESP)
Knut Lohrisch (GER)

2 November 2008
10:30

Kelburne (Scotland)	0–3	(England) East Grinstead
	Report	Häner 23'; Male 59'; Hall 62'

Stade de la reu Henri Delescaux, Lille
Umpires:
Marc Knulle (FRA)
Knut Lohrisch (GER)

=== Pool G ===
Pos	Team	Pld	W	D	L	GF	GA	GD	Pts	Qualification
1	(Spain) Real Club de Polo	2	2	0	0	8	2	+6	10	Advance to knockout stage
2	(Germany) UHC Hamburg	2	1	0	1	5	6	−1	5	Advance to knockout stage
3	(France) Lille (H)	2	0	0	2	3	8	−5	1	

Source: EHF
(H) Hosts

31 October 2008
20:30

Lille (France)	1–4	(Spain) Real Club de Polo
T. Becuwe 35'	Report	Fröschle 15'; Dabanch 45'; Casasayas 65'; Padrós 68'

Stade de la reu Henri Delescaux, Lille
Umpires:
Roel van Eert (NED)
Marcin Grochal (POL)

1 November 2008
16:30

UHC Hamburg (Germany)	1–4	(Spain) Real Club de Polo
Breitenstein 50'	Report	Fröschle 31'; Borrell 38'; Wein 60'; A. Fàbregas 69'

Stade de la reu Henri Delescaux, Lille
Umpires:
Roel van Eert (NED)
Hamish Jamson (ENG)

2 November 2008
16:30

Lille (France)	2–4	(Germany) UHC Hamburg
T. Becuwe 44', 70'	Report	Miltkau 15'; Breitenstein 27', 44'; Sunkel 53'

Stade de la reu Henri Delescaux, Lille
Umpires:
Hamish Jamson (ENG)
Will Drury (WAL)

=== Pool H ===
Pos	Team	Pld	W	D	L	GF	GA	GD	Pts	Qualification
1	(Belgium) Leuven	2	1	1	0	4	2	+2	7	Advance to knockout stage
2	(Ireland) Three Rock Rovers	2	0	2	0	1	1	0	4	Advance to knockout stage
3	(Spain) Atlètic Terrassa	2	0	1	1	1	3	−2	3	

Source: EHF

31 October 2008
16:30

Three Rock Rovers (Ireland)	0–0	(Spain) Atlètic Terrassa
	Report

Stade de la reu Henri Delescaux, Lille
Umpires:
Hamish Jamson (ENG)
Will Drury (WAL)

1 November 2008
12:30

Three Rock Rovers (Ireland)	1–1	(Belgium) Leuven
Blakeney 57'	Report	Quemada 40'

Stade de la reu Henri Delescaux, Lille
Umpires:
Marcin Grochal (POL)
Rob ten Cate (NED)

2 November 2008
12:30

Leuven (Belgium)	3–1	(Spain) Atlètic Terrassa
De Cooman 6'; Quemada 30'; Pangrazio 70'	Report	Witthaus 19'

Stade de la reu Henri Delescaux, Lille
Umpires:
Rob ten Cate (NED)
Roel van Eert (NED)

== Knockout stage ==
The round of 16 and the quarter-finals were hosted by UHC Hamburg in Hamburg, Germany between 10 and 13 April 2009 and the semi-finals, third-place match and the final were hosted by HC Rotterdam at the Hazelaarweg Stadion in Rotterdam, the Netherlands, between 30 and 31 May 2009.

=== Bracket ===
Round of 16
10 April – Hamburg
(Germany) Düsseldorfer HC	2
(Germany) UHC Hamburg	3
10 April – Hamburg
(Spain) Club Egara	4
(Germany) Club an der Alster	2
11 April – Hamburg
(Belgium) Leuven	2
(Ireland) Three Rock Rovers	1
11 April – Hamburg
(Spain) Real Club de Polo	0
(England) Reading	1
10 April – Hamburg
(Netherlands) Bloemendaal	3
(England) Cannock	1
10 April – Hamburg
(England) East Grinstead	3
(France) Saint Germain	2
11 April – Hamburg
(Netherlands) Amsterdam	4
(Belgium) Waterloo Ducks	2
11 April – Hamburg
(Netherlands) Rotterdam	4
(Poland) Grunwald Poznań	2

Quarter-finals
12 April – Hamburg
(Germany) UHC Hamburg	4
(Spain) Club Egara	3
12 April – Hamburg
(Belgium) Leuven	2
(England) Reading	1
13 April – Hamburg
(Netherlands) Bloemendaal	3
(England) East Grinstead	2
13 April – Hamburg
(Netherlands) Amsterdam	2 (1)
(Netherlands) Rotterdam (p.s.)	2 (3)

Semi-finals
30 May – Rotterdam
(Germany) UHC Hamburg	3
(Belgium) Leuven	2
30 May – Rotterdam
(Netherlands) Bloemendaal	4
(Netherlands) Rotterdam	3

Final
31 May – Rotterdam
(Germany) UHC Hamburg	4
(Netherlands) Bloemendaal	5
Bronze medal
31 May – Rotterdam
(Belgium) Leuven	1
(Netherlands) Rotterdam	8

=== Round of 16 ===
10 April 2009
09:30

Club Egara (Spain)	4–2	(Germany) Club an der Alster
Carrera 17'; Schickendantz 24', 35', 67'	Report	Sonnenschein 33'; Laatzen 64'

UHC Clubanlage, Hamburg
Umpires:
Thomas Dumon (BEL)
Andrew Mair (SCO)

10 April 2009
12:00

East Grinstead (England)	3–2	(France) Saint Germain
Hall 39', 70'; Häner 64'	Report	M. Genestet 46'; Pauchet 57'

UHC Clubanlage, Hamburg
Umpires:
Marcin Grochal (POL)
Juan Manuel Requena (ESP)

10 April 2009
14:30

Bloemendaal (Netherlands)	3–1	(England) Cannock
N. Meijer 21'; Brouwer 58'; De Nooijer 68'	Report	Jawanda 60'

UHC Clubanlage, Hamburg
Umpires:
Marcelo Servetto (ESP)
Geoff Conn (IRL)

10 April 2009
17:00

Düsseldorfer HC (Germany)	2–3	(Germany) UHC Hamburg
Simon 9'; Otte 25'	Report	Sunkel 2', 40'; Miltkau 33'

UHC Clubanlage, Hamburg
Umpires:
Michiel Brüning (NED)
Hamish Jamson (ENG)

11 April 2009
09:30

Real Club de Polo (Spain)	0–1	(England) Reading
	Report	Clarke 32'

UHC Clubanlage, Hamburg
Umpires:
Michiel Brüning (NED)
Christian Blasch (GER)

11 April 2009
12:00

Rotterdam (Netherlands)	4–2	(Poland) Grunwald Poznań
J. Hertzberger 2'; Abbas 24', 35'; Gommers 44'	Report	Mikula 63'; Dutkiewicz 65'

UHC Clubanlage, Hamburg
Umpires:
Thomas Dumon (BEL)
Juan Manuel Requena (ESP)

11 April 2009
14:30

Amsterdam (Netherlands)	4–2	(Belgium) Waterloo Ducks
Taekema 10', 14', 32'; Pruyser 39'	Report	Dohmen 9', 29'

UHC Clubanlage, Hamburg
Umpires:
Geoff Conn (IRL)
Hamish Jamson (ENG)

11 April 2009
17:00

Leuven (Belgium)	2–1	(Ireland) Three Rock Rovers
Quemada 40'; Bourdeaud'Hui 58'	Report	Blakeney 60'

UHC Clubanlage, Hamburg
Umpires:
Marcin Grochal (POL)
Marcelo Servetto (ESP)

=== Quarter-finals ===
12 April 2009
12:00

UHC Hamburg (Germany)	4–3	(Spain) Club Egara
Fürste 11', 50'; Miltkau 26'; Breitenstein 48'	Report	Schickendantz 18', 70'; Tubau 49'

UHC Clubanlage, Hamburg
Umpires:
Michiel Brüning (GER)
Andrew Mair (SCO)

12 April 2009
14:30

Bloemendaal (Netherlands)	3–2	(England) East Grinstead
Jolie 20', 57'; N. Meijer 68'	Report	Hall 11'; De Prez 43'

UHC Clubanlage, Hamburg
Umpires:
Christian Blasch (GER)
Juan Manuel Requena (ESP)

13 April 2009
12:00

Leuven (Belgium)	2–1	(England) Reading
Quemada 8'; Houssein 66'	Report	Mantell 47'

UHC Clubanlage, Hamburg
Umpires:
Marcelo Servetto (ESP)
Christian Blasch (GER)

13 April 2009
14:30

Amsterdam (Netherlands)	2–2 (a.e.t.)	(Netherlands) Rotterdam
Rohof 4'; Freixa 35'	Report	M. Hertzberger 30'; Archibald 62'
Penalties
Freixa (penalty shoot-out missed); Verga (penalty shoot-out scored)	1–3	(penalty shoot-out scored) J. Hertzberger; (penalty shoot-out scored) Burrows; (penalty shoot-out scored) Ahmad

UHC Clubanlage, Hamburg
Umpires:
Andrew Mair (SCO)
Hamish Jamson (ENG)

=== Semi-finals ===
30 May 2009
12:00

UHC Hamburg (Germany)	3–2	(Belgium) Leuven
Mieling 6'; Miltkau 19'; C. Nevado 20'	Report	Pangrazio 16'; Quemada 29'

Hazelaarweg Stadion, Rotterdam
Umpires:
Hamish Jamson (ENG)
Andrew Mair (SCO)

30 May 2009
14:30

Bloemendaal (Netherlands)	4–3	(Netherlands) Rotterdam
Jolie 23'; O. Meijer 34'; Dwyer 50'; Brouwer 54'	Report	Burrows 37', 52'; Knowles 65'

Hazelaarweg Stadion, Rotterdam
Umpires:
Christian Blasch (GER)
Henrik Ehlers (DEN)

=== Bronze medal match ===
31 May 2009
12:00

Leuven (Belgium)	1–8	(Netherlands) Rotterdam
Quemada 30'	Report	Child 2', 32'; Burrows 7', 24'; Archibald 47'; Van Buul 50'; Taylor 58'; J. Hertzberger 61'

Hazelaarweg Stadion, Rotterdam
Umpires:
Christian Blasch (GER)
Juan Manuel Requena (ESP)

=== Final ===
31 May 2009
14:30

UHC Hamburg (Germany)	4–5	(Netherlands) Bloemendaal
Sunkel 23'; Miltkau 28', 56'; Breitenstein 41'	Report	Brouwer 6', 9'; Dwyer 12'; De Nooijer 19'; O. Meijer 26'

Hazelaarweg Stadion, Rotterdam
Umpires:
Andrew Mair (SCO)
Henrik Ehlers (DEN)

== Statistics ==
=== Top goalscorers ===
Rank	Player	Team	FG	PC	PS	Goals
1	(Argentina) Guillermo Schickendantz	(Spain) Club Egara	5	6	0	11
2	(Netherlands) Ronald Brouwer	(Netherlands) Bloemendaal	7	1	0	8
3	(Netherlands) Taeke Taekema	(Netherlands) Amsterdam	0	7	0	7
4	(Spain) Santi Freixa	(Netherlands) Amsterdam	6	0	0	6
4	(New Zealand) Simon Child	(Netherlands) Rotterdam	6	0	0	6
4	(Germany) Marco Miltkau	(Germany) UHC Hamburg	5	1	0	6
4	(Spain) Pau Quemada	(Belgium) Leuven	1	5	0	6
8	(New Zealand) Phil Burrows	(Netherlands) Rotterdam	3	2	0	5
8	(Netherlands) Olmer Meijer	(Netherlands) Bloemendaal	0	5	0	5
8	(Germany) Patrick Breitenstein	(Germany) UHC Hamburg	0	5	0	5
