= Anne-Sophie Vanden Borre =

Belgian field hockey player

Personal information
- Born: 17 June 2001 (age 25) Belgium

Sport
- Sport: Field hockey
- Position: Midfield
- Club: Gantoise
National team
Years	Team	Caps	Goals
2018	Belgium U–18	5	(0)
2019–	Belgium U–21	5	(0)
–	Belgium	0	(0)
Medal record
Women's field hockey
Representing Belgium
EuroHockey Youth Championship
Silver medal – second place	2018 Valencia	Team

Anne-Sophie Vanden Borre (born 17 June 2001) is a field hockey player from Belgium, who plays as a midfielder.

== Personal life ==
Anne-Sophie Vanden Borre is the younger sister of Stéphanie Vanden Borre, a member of the Belgium national team.

== Career ==
=== Club hockey ===
In the Belgian Hockey League, Englebert plays club hockey for the Gantoise.

=== National teams ===
==== Under–18 ====
In 2018, Vanden Borre was a member of the Belgium U–18 team at the EuroHockey Youth Championship in Santander. At the tournament, Belgium finished in second place, taking home silver.

==== Under–21 ====
Following her debut for the Under–18 side in 2018, Vanden Borre appeared in the national Under–21 side in 2019. She represented the team at the EuroHockey Junior Championship in Valencia. The team finished fourth, qualifying for the 2021 FIH Junior World Cup.

==== Red Panthers ====
In December 2019, Anne-Sophie Vanden Borre was named in the Red Panthers squad for the first time. She was named in the provisional Belgian squad for the second season of the FIH Pro League.
