= Shaunda Ikegwuonu =

Belgian field hockey player

Personal information
- Born: 11 March 1998 (age 28) Belgium

Sport
- Sport: Field hockey
- Position: Forward
- Club: Braxgata
National team
Years	Team	Caps	Goals
2015–2016	Belgium U–18	10	(4)
2016–2019	Belgium U–21	15	(3)
2017–	Belgium	11	(2)
Medal record
Women's field hockey
Representing Belgium
EuroHockey Junior Championship
Silver medal – second place	2017 Valencia	Team

Shaunda Ikegwuonu (born 11 March 1998) is a field hockey player from Belgium, who plays as a forward.

== Career ==
=== Club hockey ===
In the Belgian Hockey League, Ikegwuonu plays club hockey for Braxgata.

=== International hockey ===
==== Under–18 ====
In 2015 and 2016, Shaunda Ikegwuonu was a member of the Belgium U–18 team at the EuroHockey Youth Championship. At both the 2015 and 2016 tournaments, Belgium finished in fourth place, losing to England on each occasion.

==== Under–21 ====
Following appearances for the national youth team, Ikegwuonu made her debut for the Belgium U–21 side in 2016, at a four nations tournament in Bad Kreuznach. Later that year, she went on to appear at an invitational tournament in Valencia.

In 2017, she won a silver medal at the EuroHockey Junior Championship in Valencia.

Ikegwuonu made her final appearance with the junior team in 2019, captaining the team to a fourth-place finish at the EuroHockey Junior Championship, again in Valencia.

==== Red Panthers ====
Shaunda Ikegwuonu made her senior international debut for Belgium in 2017 at the International Olive Oil Tournament in Jaén.

Her most recent appearance with the national team was during the 2020–21 FIH Pro League.

=== International goals ===
Goal	Date	Location	Opponent	Score	Result	Competition	Ref.
1	30 November 2017	Club Hockey Alcalá, Jaén, Spain	Spain	2–2	3–2	International Olive Oil Tournament	
2	25 January 2018	CeNARD, Buenos Aires, Argentina	Argentina	2–3	2–5	Test Match	

== See also ==
- Belgium women's national field hockey team
- Belgium women's national under-21 field hockey team
- Braxgata Hockey Club
