= 2017 Women's EuroHockey Championship =

International field hockey competition

2017 Women's EuroHockey Nations Championship
Tournament details
- Host country: Netherlands
- City: Amstelveen
- Dates: 18–26 August
- Teams: 8
- Venue: Wagener Stadium

Final positions
- Champions: Netherlands (9th title)
- Runner-up: Belgium
- Third place: England

Tournament statistics
- Matches played: 20
- Goals scored: 75 (3.75 per match)
- Top scorer: (Spain) Begoña García Grau (4 goals)
- Best player: (England) Hollie Webb

The 2017 Women's EuroHockey Nations Championship was the 13th edition of the women's field hockey championship organised by the European Hockey Federation. It was held from 18–26 August 2017 in the Wagener Stadium, Amstelveen, Netherlands. The tournament also served as a qualifier for the 2018 Women's Hockey World Cup, with the winner qualifying.

The Netherlands won their ninth overall title by defeating Belgium 3–0 in the final, while England capture the third place by beating Germany 2–0.

== Qualified teams ==
- Belgium
- Czech Republic
- England
- Germany
- Ireland
- Netherlands
- Scotland
- Spain

== Format ==
The eight teams are split into two groups of four teams. The top two teams advance to the semifinals to determine the winner in a knockout system. The bottom two teams play in a new group with the teams they did not play against in the group stage. The last two teams will be relegated to the EuroHockey Nations Challenge.

== Results ==
All times are local (UTC+2).

=== Preliminary round ===
==== Pool A ====
Pos	Team	Pld	W	D	L	GF	GA	GD	Pts	Qualification
1	Netherlands (H)	3	3	0	0	14	1	+13	9	Semifinals
2	Belgium	3	2	0	1	8	2	+6	6	Semifinals
3	Spain	3	1	0	2	9	6	+3	3	
4	Czech Republic	3	0	0	3	1	23	−22	0	

Source: EuroHockey
Rules for classification: 1) points; 2) goal difference; 3) goals scored; 4) head-to-head result.
(H) Hosts

18 August 2017
20:00

Netherlands	3–1	Spain
Welten 25'; Matla 29', 49'	Report	García Grau 45'

Umpires:
Laurine Delforge (BEL)
Aleesha Unka (NZL)

19 August 2017
12:30

Belgium	6–0	Czech Republic
Versavel 4'; Boon 13'; Gerniers 31'; Vanden Borre 44'; Weyns 48'; Struijk 58'	Report

Umpires:
Karine Alves (FRA)
Emma Shelbourn (ENG)

20 August 2017
11:00

Spain	7–1	Czech Republic
Salvatella 6'; García Grau 10', 41'; López 13'; Guinea 53'; Petchamé 56'; Bonastre 57'	Report	Hanzlová 44'

Umpires:
Vilma Bagdanskiene (LTU)
Claire Druijts (NED)

20 August 2017
20:00

Belgium	0–1	Netherlands
	Report	Van Geffen 30'

Umpires:
Sarah Wilson (SCO)
Emma Shelbourn (ENG)

22 August 2017
17:00

Spain	1–2	Belgium
Salvatella 29'	Report	Peeters 15'; Raes 35'

Umpires:
Michelle Meister (GER)
Sarah Wilson (SCO)

22 August 2017
20:00

Netherlands	10–0	Czech Republic
Van Maasakker 11', 28'; Van Geffen 14'; Van Male 17'; Jonker 20'; Leurink 28', 39'; Van den Assem 32'; Welten 42'; Keetels 58'	Report

Umpires:
Allison Keogh (IRL)
Emma Shelbourn (ENG)

==== Pool B ====
Pos	Team	Pld	W	D	L	GF	GA	GD	Pts	Qualification
1	Germany	3	3	0	0	10	2	+8	9	Semifinals
2	England	3	2	0	1	6	2	+4	6	Semifinals
3	Scotland	3	0	1	2	1	6	−5	1	
4	Ireland	3	0	1	2	2	9	−7	1	

Source: EuroHockey
Rules for classification: 1) points; 2) goal difference; 3) goals scored; 4) head-to-head result.

19 August 2017
10:15

Germany	4–1	Scotland
Stapenhorst 1', 55'; Grambusch 13'; Martin-Pelegrina 52'	Report	Burnet 58'

Umpires:
Claire Druijts (NED)
Alison Keogh (IRL)

19 August 2017
14:45

England	4–1	Ireland
Unsworth 5'; Watton 37'; Bray 43'; Danson 55'	Report	Tice 42'

Umpires:
Michelle Meister (GER)
Vilma Bagdanskiene (LTU)

20 August 2017
13:15

Ireland	0–0	Scotland
	Report

Umpires:
Karine Alves (FRA)
Aleesha Unka (NZL)

20 August 2017
17:45

Germany	1–0	England
Pieper 5'	Report

Umpires:
Irene Presenqui (ARG)
Alison Keogh (IRL)

22 August 2017
12:30

England	2–0	Scotland
Hunter 35'; Ansley 59'	Report

Umpires:
Laurine Delforge (BEL)
Claire Druijts (NED)

22 August 2017
14:45

Ireland	1–5	Germany
O'Byrne 23'	Report	Lorenz 2'; Hauke 22'; Oldhafer 50'; Pieper 51'; Stapenhorst 54'

Umpires:
Vilma Bagdanskiene (LTU)
Irene Presenqui (ARG)

=== Fifth to eighth place classification ===
==== Pool C ====
The points obtained in the preliminary round against the other team are taken over.

Pos	Team	Pld	W	D	L	GF	GA	GD	Pts	Relegation
1	Spain	3	3	0	0	16	4	+12	9	
2	Ireland	3	1	1	1	5	8	−3	4	
3	Czech Republic	3	1	0	2	3	10	−7	3	Relegated to EuroHockey Nations Challenge
4	Scotland	3	0	1	2	1	3	−2	1	Relegated to EuroHockey Nations Challenge

Source: EuroHockey
Rules for classification: 1) points; 2) goal difference; 3) goals scored; 4) head-to-head result.

24 August 2017
12:30

Czech Republic	1–3	Ireland
Haklová 47'	Report	Tice 1'; Upton 49'; O'Flanagan 54'

Umpires:
Karine Alves (FRA)
Vilma Bagdanskiene (LTU)

24 August 2017
14:45

Spain	2–1	Scotland
García Grau 12'; Petchamé 55'	Report	Lloyd 42'

Umpires:
Irene Presenqui (ARG)
Emma Shelbourn (ENG)

26 August 2017
12:15

Spain	7–2	Ireland
Guinea 7'; Tost 24'; Petchamé 37'; Riera 42', 45'; Segu 55'; Ybarra 60'	Report	O'Flanagan 22', 35'

Umpires:
Michelle Meister (GER)
Karine Alves (FRA)

26 August 2017
14:30

Scotland	0–1	Czech Republic
	Report	Mejzlíková 29'

Umpires:
Alison Keogh (IRL)
Claire Druijts (NED)

=== First to fourth place classification ===
Semi-finals
24 August
Netherlands	1
England	0
24 August
Germany	0
Belgium	1

Final
26 August
Netherlands	3
Belgium	0
Third place
26 August
England	2
Germany	0

==== Semifinals ====
24 August 2017
17:00

Germany	0–1	Belgium
	Report	Boon 28'

Umpires:
Aleesha Unka (NZL)
Sarah Wilson (SCO)

24 August 2017
20:00

Netherlands	1–0	England
Keetels 49'	Report

Umpires:
Michelle Meister (GER)
Laurine Delforge (BEL)

==== Third and fourth place ====
26 August 2017
17:00

Germany	0–2	England
	Report	Martin 29'; Danson 55'

Umpires:
Laurine Delforge (BEL)
Allesh Unka (NZL)

==== Final ====
26 August 2017
20:00

Belgium	0–3	Netherlands
	Report	Dirkse van den Heuvel 12'; Jonker 48'; Van den Assem 60'

Umpires:
Irene Presenqui (ARG)
Sarah Wilson (SCO)

== Final standings ==
Rank	Team
Gold medal	Netherlands
Silver medal	Belgium
Bronze medal	England
4	Germany
5	Spain
6	Ireland
7	Czech Republic
8	Scotland

== Awards ==
Top Goalscorer	Player of the Tournament	Goalkeeper of the Tournament	Young Player of the Tournament
(Spain) Begoña García Grau	(England) Hollie Webb	(Belgium) Aisling D'Hooghe	(Netherlands) Pien Sanders

== Goalscorers ==
4 goals

- (Spain) Begoña García Grau

3 goals

- (Germany) Charlotte Stapenhorst
- (Ireland) Anna O'Flanagan
- (Spain) Carlota Petchamé

2 goals

- (Belgium) Jill Boon
- (England) Alex Danson
- (Germany) Cécile Pieper
- (Ireland) Elena Tice
- (Netherlands) Ireen van den Assem
- (Netherlands) Margot van Geffen
- (Netherlands) Kelly Jonker
- (Netherlands) Marloes Keetels
- (Netherlands) Laurien Leurink
- (Netherlands) Caia van Maasakker
- (Netherlands) Frédérique Matla
- (Netherlands) Lidewij Welten
- (Spain) Cristina Guinea
- (Spain) Lola Riera
- (Spain) Carola Salvatella

1 goal

- (Belgium) Alix Gerniers
- (Belgium) Joanne Peeters
- (Belgium) Anouk Raes
- (Belgium) Michelle Struijk
- (Belgium) Stephanie Van Den Borre
- (Belgium) Louise Versavel
- (Belgium) Anne-Sophie Weyns
- (Czech Republic) Barbora Haklová
- (Czech Republic) Klára Hanzlová
- (Czech Republic) Tereza Mejzlíková
- (England) Giselle Ansley
- (England) Sophie Bray
- (England) Jo Hunter
- (England) Hannah Martin
- (England) Laura Unsworth
- (England) Ellie Watton
- (Germany) Pia Grambusch
- (Germany) Franzisca Hauke
- (Germany) Nike Lorenz
- (Germany) Pia-Sophie Oldhafer
- (Germany) Teresa Martin Pelegrina
- (Ireland) Yvonne O'Byrne
- (Ireland) Roisin Upton
- (Netherlands) Carlien Dirkse van den Heuvel
- (Netherlands) Kitty van Male
- (Scotland) Fiona Burnet
- (Scotland) Nikki Lloyd
- (Spain) Berta Bonastre
- (Spain) María López
- (Spain) Marta Segu
- (Spain) María Tost
- (Spain) Rocío Ybarra
