= Tiphaine Duquesne =

Belgian field hockey player

Personal information
- Born: 22 August 1996 (age 29) Belgium

Sport
- Sport: Field hockey
- Position: Defence
- Club: Waterloo Ducks
National team
Years	Team	Caps	Goals
2014–2017	Belgium U–21	21	(2)
2014–	Belgium	39	(0)
Medal record
Women's field hockey
Representing Belgium
European Championship
Bronze medal – third place	2021 Amstelveen
EuroHockey Junior Championship
Silver medal – second place	2017 Valencia

Tiphaine Duquesne (born 22 August 1996) is a field hockey player from Belgium, who plays as a defender.

== Career ==
=== Club hockey ===
In the Belgian Hockey League, Duquesne plays club hockey for the Waterloo Ducks.

=== National teams ===
==== Under–21 ====
In 2014, Tiphaine Duquesne made her debut for the Belgium U–21 team at the EuroHockey Junior Championship in Waterloo.

She was a member of the junior national team for three years, including at the 2016 FIH Junior World Cup in Santiago where the team finished sixth. Her junior career culminated with a silver medal at the 2017 EuroHockey Junior Championship in Valencia.

==== Red Panthers ====
Duquesne made her debut for the Belgium 'Red Panthers' in 2014 during a test match against Argentina in Auderghem.

During the inaugural tournament of the FIH Pro League in 2019, Duquesne was a member of the Belgian side that finished in fifth place.
