= Pau Quemada =

Spanish field hockey player

Personal information
- Full name: Pau Quemada Cadafalc
- Born: 4 September 1983 (age 42) Logroño, Spain
- Height: 1.73 m (5 ft 8 in)
- Weight: 69 kg (152 lb)

Sport
- Sport: Field hockey
- Position: Forward
- Club: Leuven
Youth career
- Team
- –: Club Egara
Senior career
Years	Team	Caps	Goals
–2005	Club Egara	-	-
2005–2006	Laren	-	-
2006–2009	Leuven	-	-
2009–2011	Real Club de Polo	-	-
2011–2016	Leuven	-	-
2016–2021	Club Egara	-	-
2021–present	Leuven	-	-
National team
Years	Team	Caps	Goals
2003–2021	Spain	293	(119)
Medal record
Men's field hockey
Representing Spain
World Cup
Bronze medal – third place	2006 Mönchengladbach
EuroHockey Championship
Silver medal – second place	2019 Antwerp
Champions Trophy
Silver medal – second place	2011 Auckland

Pau Quemada Cadafalch (born 4 September 1983) is a Spanish field hockey player who plays a forward for Belgian club Leuven. He played a total of 293 times for the Spanish national team from 2003 until 2021.

== Club career ==
Quemada played club hockey in Spain for Club Egara before moving to Larensche Mixed Hockey Club in the Netherlands in 2005. He left them after one season because they were relegated. He decided to go to Belgium to play for KHC Leuven, where he played for three seasons, before returning to Spain to play for Real Club de Polo. Pau played there from 2009 until 2011, when he returned to Leuven. After eleven years away from Club Egara, he returned to the club in 2016. He returned to Leuven for a third period in Belgium after his retirement as an international player in 2021.

== International career ==
At the 2012 Summer Olympics, he competed for the national team in the men's tournament. He also competed for the team in the 2016 Summer Olympics tournament. Alongside three other players, he was the topscorer of the 2019 EuroHockey Championship with five goals. On 25 May 2021, he was selected in the squad for the 2021 EuroHockey Championship. He was named the player of the tournament as Spain finished in fifth place. He retired from playing international hockey after the 2020 Summer Olympics.
