= Jill Boon =

Belgian field hockey player (born 1987)

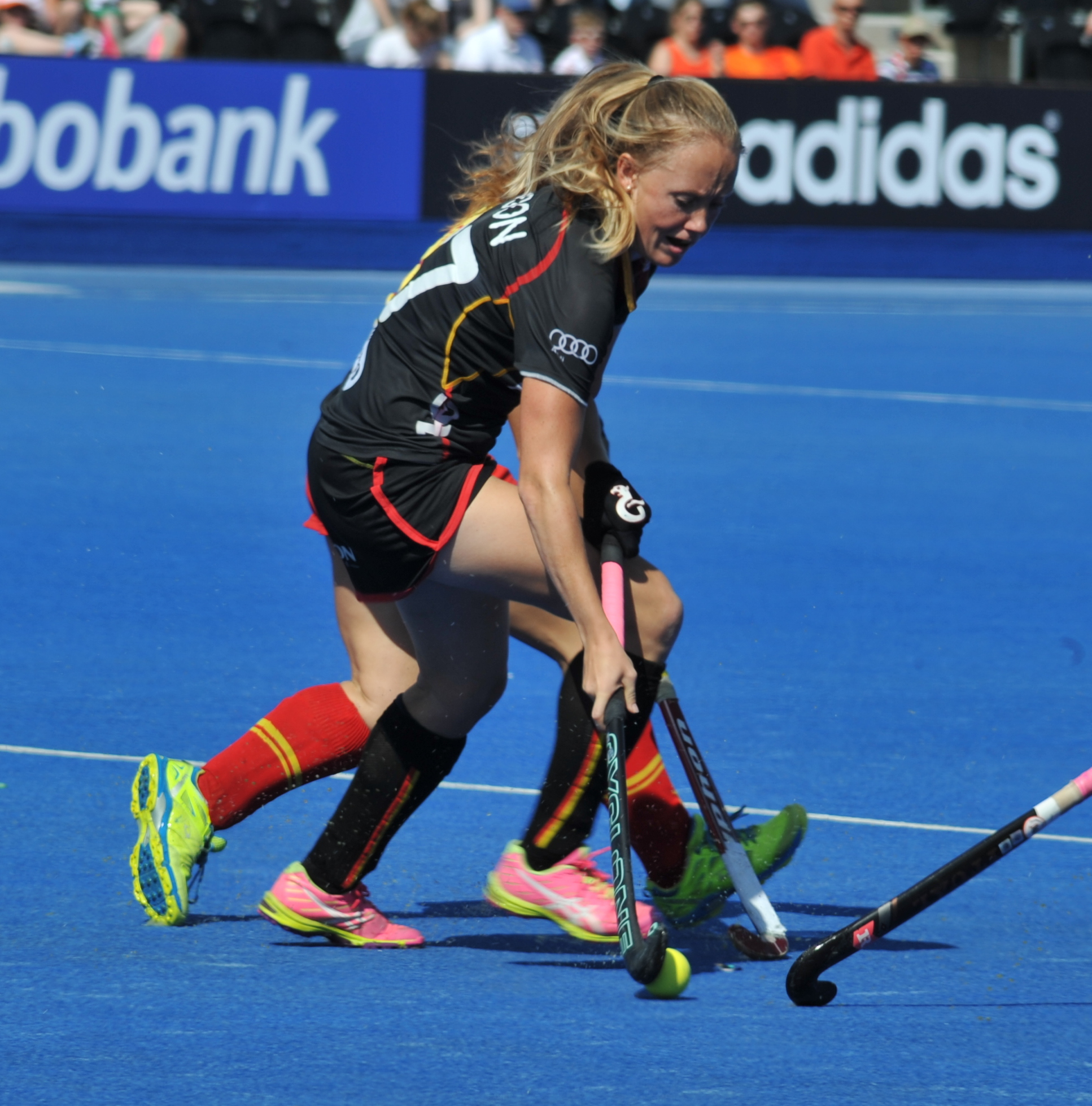
- Boon at the 2015 Women's EuroHockey Championship

Personal information
- Born: 13 March 1987 (age 39) Uccle, Belgium
- Height: 1.72 m (5 ft 8 in)
- Weight: 64 kg (141 lb)

Sport
- Sport: Field hockey
- Position: Forward
- Club: Racing club de bruxelles
National team
Years	Team	Caps	Goals
–	Belgium	302	-
Medal record
Women's field hockey
Representing Belgium
European Championships
Silver medal – second place	2017 Amstelveen

Jill Boon (born 13 March 1987) is a Belgian field hockey player. At the 2012 Summer Olympics she competed with the Belgium women's national field hockey team in the women's tournament.

Her brother is Tom Boon, also a field hockey player for Belgium.
