= Braxgata HC =

Belgian field hockey club

Braxgata
- Full name: Braxgata Hockey Club
- League: Men's Hockey League; Women's Hockey League
- Founded: 1981; 45 years ago
- Home ground: De Schorre, Boom.

Personnel
- Chairman: Erik Gysels
- Website: Club website

Braxgata Hockey Club, also known as Braxgata, is a Belgian professional sports club based in Boom. The club is most well known for its field hockey section, with both the first men's and women's teams playing as part of the Men's Belgian Hockey League.

== History ==
Braxgata was founded in 1981. In 1997, it was named by the Royal Belgian Hockey Association as Club of the Year. Since 2005, Braxgata has found its home in De Schorre.

In 2007, Braxgata organized (together with the Royal Belgian Hockey Association) the Champions Challenge . The Belgian Red Lions participated, but finished in sixth place. The winner of that tournament was Argentina, who won 3–2 after extra time against New Zealand in an exciting final.

In March 2009, Braxgata opened its new club house. In June 2009, Braxgata was named European Hockey Club of the Year by the European Hockey Federation.

In 2013, Braxgata hosted the 2013 Men's EuroHockey Championship and the 2013 Women's EuroHockey Championship.

In 2016, together with the Phantoms Boom (Boom's Basketball Team), Braxgata started on construction of a multi-functional sports hall. It officially dubbed the BraxHall and was opened in March 2017. The BraxHall has been owned by the town of Boom, via its Autonomous Municipality Company Boom Plus, since January 1, 2020.

In 2025, Braxgata finished Runners up in the Women's Euro Hockey League, losing 5–1 against Den Bosch.

The first men's team and first women's team have both played in the Hockey League since the 2009–10 season. The women's team became national champions twice and finished first in the regular competition in the 2017–18 season.

== Infrastructure ==
The club grounds are located within the Provincial Domain of De Schorre in Boom. Braxgata, like KHC Dragons, based in Brasschaat, is the only Belgian club with four Artificial turf fields, consisting of three water fields and a so-called quarter sanded artificial turf field.

== Honors ==
Royal Belgian Hockey Association

- Club of the Year (1): 1997

European Hockey Federation

- European Hockey Club of the Year (1): 2009

=== Women ===
Women's Hockey League

- Winners (3): 2015–16, 2016–17, 2024–25

Women's EuroHockey Club Trophy

- 3rd place (1): 2021

Women's Euro Hockey League

- Runner-up (1): 2025

== Current squad ==
=== Men's squad ===
As of 2024–25

No.	Pos.	Nation	Player
1	GK	BEL	Lysander Burmann
4	DF	BEL	Arthur Van Doren
4	FW	FRA	Pieter van Straaten
7	MF	BEL	Anton Van Biesen
8	DF	BEL	Tanguy Clement
9	FW	IRE	Ben Walker
11	DF	BEL	Maxime Loots
12	FW	ESP	Marc Reyné
14	MF	BEL	Olivier Biekens
16	FW	BEL	Harry Van Bavel

No.	Pos.	Nation	Player
17	FW	BEL	Thomas Briels
18	FW	BEL	Victor Desmet
20	DF	BEL	Leon Van Steerteghem
23	MF	IRE	Daragh Walsh
25	DF	BEL	Loïck Luypaert
26	GK	NED	Pirmin Blaak
28	DF	BEL	Rik Van Cleynenbreugel
30	MF	BEL	Tobias Biekens
34	FW	BEL	Jef De Winter

=== Women's squad ===
As of 2024–25

No.	Pos.	Nation	Player
1	GK	BEL	Elena Sotgiu
2	MF	CZE	Kateřina Laciná
4	GK	NED	Roos de Jonge
5	MF	IRE	Michelle Carey
6	FW	BEL	Shaunda Ikegwuonu
7	MF	BEL	Judith Vandermeiren
8	DF	BEL	Lien Hillewaert
9	FW	IRE	Niamh Carey
10	FW	BEL	Louise Versavel

No.	Pos.	Nation	Player
14	FW	USA	Sanne Caarls
15	FW	BEL	Lyne Van Dieren
17	MF	BEL	Lore Hillewaert
19	DF	BEL	Helle Verlinden
21	FW	BEL	Louise Dewaet
22	DF	BEL	Stéphanie Vanden Borre
23	MF	BEL	Camille Belis
24	FW	BEL	Sofie Scheers
28	DF	ITA	Ivanna Pessina
