= KHC Leuven =

Belgian hockey club

Leuven
- Full name: Koninklijke Hockey Club Leuven
- League: Men's Hockey League; Women's Hockey League
- Founded: 1929; 97 years ago
- Home ground: Stade Chomé
- Website: Club website
Home	Away

Koninklijke Hockey Club Leuven, commonly known as KHC Leuven or simply Leuven, is a Belgian professional field hockey club based in Heverlee in Leuven, Flemish Brabant.

== Honours ==
=== Men ===
Belgian Hockey League

- Winners (1): 2007–08

EuroHockey Cup Winners' Trophy

- Winners (1): 2000
- Runners-up (1): 1997

=== Women ===
Belgian Hockey League

- Winners (5): 1992–94, 1995–96, 1996–97, 1997–98, 1998–99

== Current squad ==
=== Men's squad ===
As of 2021–22

No.	Pos.	Nation	Player
1	GK	IRE	Jamie Carr
3	DF	IRE	Sean Murray
5	DF	ESP	Bosco Pérez-Pla
6	DF	BEL	Julien Schoenaers
7	FW	BEL	Guillaume Van Lembergen
8	MF	IRE	Daragh Walsh
9	FW	BEL	Douwe Bosmans
10	FW	BEL	Pilou Maraite
12	FW	NZL	Sam Lane

No.	Pos.	Nation	Player
13	DF	IRE	Luke Madeley
14	MF	ESP	Ricardo Santana
15	MF	BEL	Bram Dujardin
17	MF	USA	Pat Harris
20	DF	BEL	Jules Coolen
22	FW	ESP	Perre Divora
25	FW	ESP	Pau Quemada
31	GK	BEL	Pierre Tavernier
32	DF	BEL	Victor Soetens
