= Ambre Ballenghien =

Belgian field hockey player (born 2000)

Personal information
- Born: 13 December 2000 (age 25) Brussels, Belgium
- Height: 1.67 m (5 ft 6 in)
- Weight: 58 kg (128 lb)

Sport
- Sport: Field hockey
- Position: Attacker
- Club: La Gantoise
National team
Years	Team	Caps	Goals
2017	Belgium U–21	4	(0)
2017–	Belgium	79	(38)
Medal record
Women's field hockey
Representing Belgium
World Cup
Bronze medal – third place	2026 Wavre/Amstelveen
EuroHockey Championships
Bronze medal – third place	2021 Amsterdam	Team
FIH Olympic Qualifiers
Gold medal – first place	2024 Valencia	Team
EuroHockey Junior Championship
Silver medal – second place	2017 Valencia	Team

Ambre Ballenghien (born 13 December 2000) is a Belgian field hockey player, who plays as a striker.

== Career ==
=== Junior National Team ===
In 2017, Ambre Ballenghien made her first appearance for a Belgian junior team at the EuroHockey Junior Championship in Valencia. At the tournament, Belgium won their first medal at the tournament, finishing second after losing in the final.

=== Senior National Team ===
Ballenghien made her senior international debut in 2017, in a test match against Germany. During the match, she scored her first international goal.

In 2019, Ballenghien was a member of the Belgian team in the inaugural FIH Pro League. The team finished in fifth place, eight places above their pre tournament ranking of 13th. Throughout the tournament, Ballenghien scored 3 goals.

==== International Goals ====
Goal	Date	Location	Opponent	Score	Result	Event	Ref
1	14 April 2017	Venlose Hockey Club, Venlo, Netherlands	Germany	3–1	3–4	Test Match	
2	27 November 2018	Spooky Nook Sports, Lancaster, United States	United States	1–1	2–3	Test Match	
3	29 November 2018	Spooky Nook Sports, Lancaster, United States	United States	4–1	4–1	Test Match	
4	7 April 2019	Royal Uccle Sport, Brussels, Belgium	China	2–0	4–1	2019 FIH Pro League	
5	12 June 2019	Crefelder Hockey und Tennis Club, Krefeld, Germany	Germany	1–0	1–2	2019 FIH Pro League	
6	19 June 2019	Wilrijkse Plein, Antwerp, Belgium	Australia	1–0	1–0	2019 FIH Pro League	
7	7 August 2019	Wilrijkse Plein, Antwerp, Belgium	Ireland	3–1	4–2	Test Match	
8	23 August 2019	Wilrijkse Plein, Antwerp, Belgium	Ireland	1–1	1–2	2019 EuroHockey Championships	
9	14 October 2019	National Sports Campus, Dublin, Ireland	South Korea	2–0	2–0	Test Match	
10	1 February 2020	North Harbour Hockey Stadium, Auckland, New Zealand	New Zealand	1–0	2–1	2020–21 FIH Pro League	
11	23 September 2020	Düsseldorfer HC, Düsseldorf, Germany	Germany	1–0	1–3	2020–21 FIH Pro League	
12	16 May 2021	Wilrijkse Plein, Antwerp, Belgium	United States	1–0	6–1	2020–21 FIH Pro League	
13	16 May 2021	Wilrijkse Plein, Antwerp, Belgium	United States	4–0	6–1	2020–21 FIH Pro League	
14	6 June 2021	Wagener Stadium, Amsterdam, Netherlands	Germany	1–1	1–1	2021 EuroHockey Championships	
15	7 June 2021	Wagener Stadium, Amsterdam, Netherlands	Italy	1–0	4–0	2021 EuroHockey Championships	
16	7 June 2021	Wagener Stadium, Amsterdam, Netherlands	Italy	4–0	4–0	2021 EuroHockey Championships	
17	13 June 2021	Wagener Stadium, Amsterdam, Netherlands	Spain	3–1	3–1	2021 EuroHockey Championships	
18	16 October 2021	Royal Uccle Sport, Brussels, Belgium	Germany	1–0	1–0	2021–22 FIH Pro League	
19	20 May 2022	Wilrijkse Plein, Antwerp, Belgium	Spain	1–0	1–2	2021–22 FIH Pro League	
20	21 May 2022	Wilrijkse Plein, Antwerp, Belgium	Spain	2–0	3–0	2021–22 FIH Pro League	
21	11 June 2022	Wilrijkse Plein, Antwerp, Belgium	India	2–0	2–1	2021–22 FIH Pro League	
22	12 June 2022	Wilrijkse Plein, Antwerp, Belgium	India	5–0	5–0	2021–22 FIH Pro League	
23	16 June 2022	HC Den Bosch, 's-Hertogenbosch, Netherlands	United States	1–0	3–0	2021–22 FIH Pro League	
24	6 July 2022	Estadi Olímpic de Terrassa, Terrassa, Spain	Japan	3–0	3–0	2022 FIH World Cup	
25	7 November 2022	Estadio Mendocino de Hockey, Mendoza, Argentina	Germany	2–2	2–2	2022–23 FIH Pro League	
26	9 November 2022	Estadio Mendocino de Hockey, Mendoza, Argentina	Argentina	2–1	2–2	2022–23 FIH Pro League	
27	15 January 2024	Estadio Beteró, Valencia, Spain	South Korea	1–0	10–1	2024 FIH Olympic Qualifier	
28	15 January 2024	Estadio Beteró, Valencia, Spain	South Korea	2–0	10–1	2024 FIH Olympic Qualifier	
29	15 January 2024	Estadio Beteró, Valencia, Spain	South Korea	6–0	10–1	2024 FIH Olympic Qualifier	
30	15 January 2024	Estadio Beteró, Valencia, Spain	South Korea	10–1	10–1	2024 FIH Olympic Qualifier	
31	16 January 2024	Estadio Beteró, Valencia, Spain	Ukraine	1–0	13–0	2024 FIH Olympic Qualifier	
32	16 January 2024	Estadio Beteró, Valencia, Spain	Ukraine	4–0	13–0	2024 FIH Olympic Qualifier	
33	16 January 2024	Estadio Beteró, Valencia, Spain	Ukraine	5–0	13–0	2024 FIH Olympic Qualifier	
34	16 January 2024	Estadio Beteró, Valencia, Spain	Ukraine	9–0	13–0	2024 FIH Olympic Qualifier	
35	16 January 2024	Estadio Beteró, Valencia, Spain	Ukraine	10–0	13–0	2024 FIH Olympic Qualifier	
36	25 May 2024	Wilrijkse Plein, Antwerp, Belgium	India	1–0	2–1	2023–24 FIH Pro League	
37	26 May 2024	Wilrijkse Plein, Antwerp, Belgium	United States	2–1	2–1	2023–24 FIH Pro League	
38	1 June 2024	Wilrijkse Plein, Antwerp, Belgium	China	1–1	1–2	2023–24 FIH Pro League	
