= Women's Belgian Hockey League =

- Most recent season or competition: 2024–25 Women's Belgian Hockey League
- Sport: Field hockey
- Founded: 1921; 105 years ago
- First season: 1921–22
- Administrator: Royal Belgian Hockey Association
- No. of teams: 12
- Country: Belgium
- Confederation: EHF (Europe)
- Most recent champion: La Gantoise (7th title) (2025–26)
- Most titles: Uccle Sport (22 titles)
- Level on pyramid: 1
- Relegation to: National 1
- International cup: Euro Hockey League

The Women's Belgian Hockey League is the top women's league competition for field hockey clubs in Belgium. The league is played since the 1921–22 season.

Gantoise are the most recent champions having won their sixth title in the 2023–24 season.

== Format ==
The season usually starts in September and ends around the end of April or the beginning of May. From the 2021–22 season onwards the league is played by twelve teams who play each other twice and who compete for four spots in the championship play-offs. The number one and four and the number two and three play each other in the semi-final and the winners qualify for the final where the winner will be crowned champion. The last two teams are relegated to the National 1 and the tenth placed team plays a relegation play-off against the third-placed team in the second division.

== Teams ==
2023–24 Women's Belgian Hockey League teams
Location of Brussels teams in the 2023–24 Women's Belgian Hockey League

Team	Location	Province
Antwerp	Sint-Job-in-'t-Goor	Antwerp
Braxgata	Boom	Antwerp
Dragons	Brasschaat	Antwerp
Gantoise	Ghent	East Flanders
Herakles	Lier	Antwerp
Léopold	Uccle	Brussels
Leuven	Heverlee	Flemish Brabant
Pingouin	Nivelles	Walloon Brabant
Racing	Uccle	Brussels
Victory	Edegem	Antwerp
Waterloo Ducks	Waterloo	Walloon Brabant
Wellington	Uccle	Brussels

=== Number of teams by province ===
Province	Number of teams	Team(s)
Antwerp	5	Antwerp, Braxgata, Dragons, Herakles, Victory
Brussels	3	Léopold, Racing, Wellington
Walloon Brabant	2	Pingouin, Waterloo Ducks
East Flanders	1	Gantoise
Flemish Brabant	1	Leuven
Total	12	

== List of champions ==
1921–1958
No.	Season	Champion
1	1921–22	Léopold (1)
2	1922–23	Léopold (2)
3	1923–24	Racing (1)
4	1924–25	Racing (2)
5	1925–26	Léopold (3)
6	1926–27	Racing (3)
7	1927–28	Rasante (1)
8	1928–29	Rasante (2)
9	1929–30	Léopold (4)
10	1930–31	Rasante (3)
11	1931–32	Rasante (4)
12	1932–33	Racing (4)
–	1933–34	Not held
–	1934–35	Not held
13	1935–36	Léopold (5)
14	1936–37	Léopold (6)
15	1937–38	Rasante (5)
16	1938–39	Rasante (6)
17	1939–40	Rasante (7)
–	1940–41	Not held
18	1941–42	Rasante (8)
19	1942–43	Beerschot (1)
20	1943–44	Beerschot (2)
21	1944–45	Rasante (9)
22	1945–46	Beerschot (3)
23	1946–47	Beerschot (4)
24	1947–48	Racing (5)
25	1948–49	Racing (6)
26	1949–50	Léopold (7)
27	1950–51	Léopold (8)
28	1951–52	Beerschot (5)
29	1952–53	Antwerp (1)
30	1953–54	Antwerp (2)
31	1954–55	Antwerp (3)
32	1955–56	Antwerp (4)
33	1956–57	Antwerp (5)
34	1957–58	Antwerp (6)

1958–1993
No.	Season	Champion
35	1958–59	Antwerp (7)
36	1959–60	Antwerp (8)
37	1960–61	Antwerp (9)
38	1961–62	Antwerp (10)
–	1962–63	Not finished
39	1963–64	Antwerp (11)
40	1964–65	Antwerp (12)
41	1965–66	Uccle Sport (1)
42	1966–67	Uccle Sport (2)
43	1967–68	Uccle Sport (3)
44	1968–69	Uccle Sport (4)
45	1969–70	Uccle Sport (5)
46	1970–71	Uccle Sport (6)
47	1971–72	Uccle Sport (7)
48	1972–73	Uccle Sport (8)
49	1973–74	Uccle Sport (9)
50	1974–75	Uccle Sport (10)
51	1975–76	Uccle Sport (11)
52	1976–77	Uccle Sport (12)
53	1977–78	Uccle Sport (13)
54	1978–79	Uccle Sport (14)
55	1979–80	Uccle Sport (15)
56	1980–81	Uccle Sport (16)
57	1981–82	Uccle Sport (17)
58	1982–83	Uccle Sport (18)
59	1983–84	Uccle Sport (19)
60	1984–85	Uccle Sport (20)
61	1985–86	Uccle Sport (21)
62	1986–87	Rasante (10)
63	1987–88	Rasante (11)
64	1988–89	Uccle Sport (22)
65	1989–90	Rasante (12)
66	1990–91	Rasante (13)
67	1991–92	Léopold (9)
68	1992–93	Leuven (1)

1993–2026
No.	Season	Champion
69	1993–94	Dragons (1)
70	1994–95	Léopold (10)
71	1995–96	Leuven (2)
72	1996–97	Leuven (3)
73	1997–98	Leuven (4)
74	1998–99	Leuven (5)
75	1999–2000	Léopold (11)
76	2000–01	Léopold (12)
77	2001–02	Parc (1)
78	2002–03	Victory (1)
79	2003–04	Léopold (13)
80	2004–05	Léopold (14)
81	2005–06	Gantoise (1)
82	2006–07	Antwerp (13)
83	2007–08	Antwerp (14)
84	2008–09	Gantoise (2)
85	2009–10	Antwerp (15)
86	2010–11	Wellington (1)
87	2011–12	Antwerp (16)
88	2012–13	Antwerp (17)
89	2013–14	Wellington (2)
90	2014–15	Antwerp (18)
91	2015–16	Braxgata (1)
92	2016–17	Braxgata (2)
93	2017–18	Waterloo Ducks (1)
94	2018–19	Antwerp (19)
–	2019–20	Not finished
95	2020–21	Gantoise (3)
96	2021–22	Gantoise (4)
97	2022–23	Gantoise (5)
98	2023–24	Gantoise (6)
99	2024–25	Braxgata (3)
100	2025–26	Gantoise (7)
101	2026–27	

=== By club ===
Club	Championship(s)	Year(s) won
Uccle Sport	22	1965–66, 1966–67, 1967–68, 1968–69, 1969–70, 1970–71, 1971–72, 1972–73, 1973–74, 1974–75, 1975–76, 1976–77, 1977–78, 1978–79, 1979–80, 1980–81, 1981–82, 1982–83, 1983–84, 1984–85, 1985–86, 1988–89
Antwerp	19	1952–53, 1953–54, 1954–55, 1955–56, 1956–57, 1957–58, 1958–59, 1959–60, 1960–61, 1961–62, 1963–64, 1964–65, 2006–07, 2007–08, 2009–10, 2011–12, 2012–13, 2014–15, 2018–19
Léopold	14	1921–22, 1922–23, 1925–26, 1929–30, 1935–36, 1936–37, 1949–50, 1950–51, 1991–91, 1994–95, 1999–2000, 2000–01, 2003–04, 2004–05
Rasante	13	1927–28, 1928–29, 1930–31, 1931–32, 1937–38, 1938–39, 1939–40, 1941–42, 1944–45, 1986–87, 1987–88, 1989–90, 1990–91
Gantoise	7	2005–06, 2008–09, 2020–21, 2021–22, 2022-23, 2023-24, 2025–26
Racing	6	1923–24, 1924–25, 1926–27, 1932–33, 1947–48, 1948–49
Beerschot	5	1942–43, 1943–44, 1945–46, 1946–47, 1951–52
Leuven	5	1992–94, 1995–96, 1996–97, 1997–98, 1998–99
Braxgata	3	2015–16, 2016–17, 2024–25
Wellington	2	2010–11, 2013–14
Dragons	1	1993–94
Parc	1	2001–02
Victory	1	2002–03
Waterloo Ducks	1	2017–18

== See also ==
- Men's Belgian Hockey League
