= Wagener Stadium =

Stadium in Amstelveen, Netherlands

- Wagener Stadion
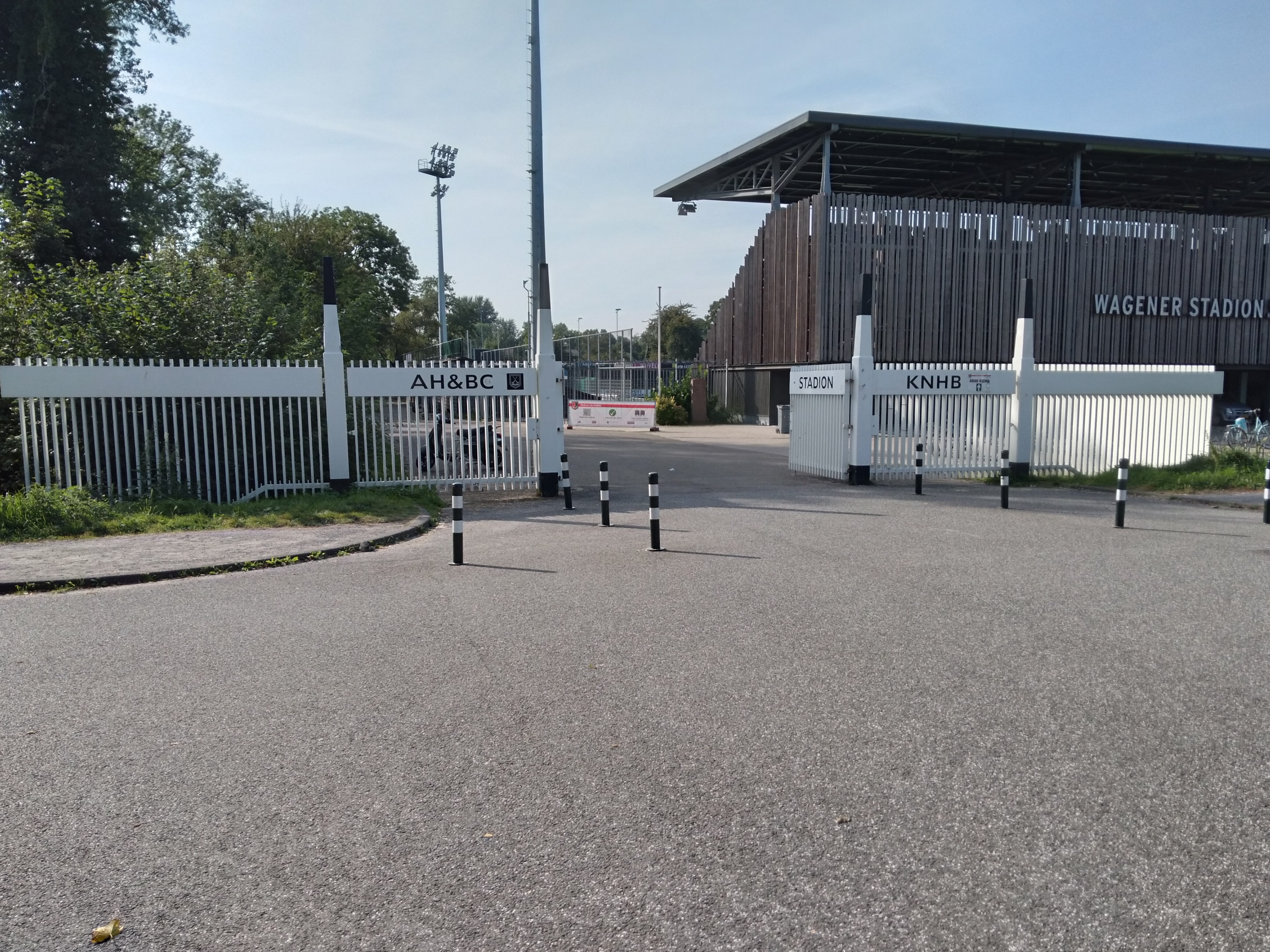
- Interactive map of Wagener Stadium
- Location: Amsterdam, Netherlands
- Coordinates: 52°19′12″N 4°51′09″E
- Owner: Dutch Hockey Association
- Capacity: 7,600
- Surface: Grass, Astroturf

Wagener Stadium is a multi-purpose stadium in Amstelveen, Netherlands. It is currently used mostly for field hockey matches and hosted matches for the 1973 World Hockey Cup. The stadium holds 7,600 people.

The complex has belonged to the Dutch Hockey Association ("Koninklijke Nederlandse Hockey Bond") since 1980.

Its location is the Amsterdamse Bos in Amstelveen. It was built by the Amsterdam Hockey & Bandy Club to honour its president, Joop Wagener (1881–1945). The building was completed in 1938, two years before World War II came to Netherlands.

During the 1970s it became clear that AHBC could no longer afford the stadium, which was eventually sold to the Koninklijke Nederlandse Hockey Bond. AHBC still has the first right to play in the stadium.

South Africa-India at the 2026 Women’s FIH Hockey World Cup, played at Wagener Stadium, Amstelveen, the Netherlands, on August 18th 2026.

In the past, the stadium has hosted the following major tournaments:

- Men's FIH Hockey World Cup in 1973, 2026
- Women's FIH Hockey World Cup in 2022, 2026
- Men's EuroHockey Championship in 1983, 2009, 2017, 2021
- Women's EuroHockey Championship in 1995, 2009, 2017, 2021
- Men's Hockey Champions Trophy in 1982, 1987, 2000, 2003
- Women's Hockey Champions Trophy in 1987, 1993, 2000, 2001, 2006, 2011
