= Barbara Nelen =

Belgian field hockey player

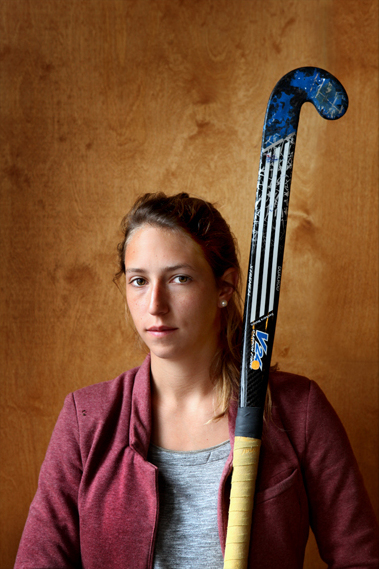

Personal information
- Born: 20 August 1991 (age 34) Ghent, Belgium
- Height: 1.67 m (5 ft 6 in)
- Weight: 56 kg (123 lb)

Sport
- Sport: Field hockey
- Position: Midfielder
- Club: Gantoise
National team
Years	Team	Caps	Goals
–	Belgium	223	-
Medal record
Women's field hockey
Representing Belgium
European Championships
Silver medal – second place	2017 Amstelveen
Silver medal – second place	2023 Mönchengladbach
Bronze medal – third place	2021 Amstelveen

Barbara Nelen (born 20 August 1991) is a Belgian field hockey player and sister of the legendary Belgian defender Carole de Schrijver. At the 2012 Summer Olympics she competed with the Belgium women's national field hockey team in the women's tournament.
