= Emilie Sinia =

Belgian field hockey player (born 1985)

Emilie Sinia (born 3 May 1985) is a Belgian field hockey player. At the 2012 Summer Olympics she competed with the Belgium women's national field hockey team in the women's tournament.
