= Waterloo Ducks H.C. =

Belgian field hockey club

Waterloo Ducks
- Full name: Waterloo Ducks Hockey Club
- League: Men's Belgian Hockey League; Women's Hockey League
- Founded: 1950; 76 years ago
- Website: Club website
| Home | Away |

The Waterloo Ducks Hockey Club, also known as the Waterloo Ducks, is a Belgian professional field hockey club based in Waterloo, Walloon Brabant. Both the first men's and women's team play in the highest division of Belgian field hockey.

In 2019 they became the first Belgian club to win the Euro Hockey League by defeating Rot-Weiss Köln from Germany 4–0 in the final.

== Honours ==
=== Men ===
- Men's Belgian Hockey League
  - Winners (6): 2005–06, 2008–09, 2011–12, 2012–13, 2013–14, 2025–26
- Euro Hockey League
  - Winners (1): 2018–19

=== Women ===
- Belgian national title
  - Winners (1): 2017–18
- Women's EuroHockey Indoor Club Cup
  - Winners (1): 2026

== Current squad ==
=== Men's squad ===
As of 2021–22

| No. | Pos. | Nation | Player |
|---|---|---|---|
| 1 | GK | BEL | Simon Vandenbrouck |
| 7 | MF | BEL | Guillaume Van Marcke |
| 9 | DF | BEL | Maxime Van Oost |
| 12 | FW | BEL | Emile Esquelin |
| 13 | DF | FRA | Nicolas Dumont |
| 14 | FW | BEL | Tommy Willems |
| 17 | MF | BEL | Loïc Sidler |

| No. | Pos. | Nation | Player |
|---|---|---|---|
| 19 | MF | BEL | William Ghislain |
| 22 | DF | FRA | Victor Charlet |
| 25 | FW | BEL | Gaetan Dykmans |
| 26 | MF | BEL | Louis De Backer |
| 27 | FW | BEL | Jérémy Wilbers |
| 30 | DF | BEL | Brieuc Petit |
| — | FW | BEL | Louis Depelsenaire |

=== Women's squad ===
As of September 2020

| No. | Pos. | Nation | Player |
|---|---|---|---|
| 3 | MF | BEL | Anouck Vandersteen |
| 4 | FW | BEL | Lucie Breyne |
| 6 | FW | BEL | Daphné Gose |
| 7 | DF | BEL | Tiphaine Duquesne |
| 8 | MF | FRA | Yohanna Lhopital |
| 9 | FW | BEL | Emily White |
| 11 | MF | BEL | Mathilde Raeymaekers |
| 12 | FW | BEL | Marie Ronquetti |
| 13 | MF | BEL | Claire Barry |

| No. | Pos. | Nation | Player |
|---|---|---|---|
| 15 | MF | BEL | Alexia 't Serstevens |
| 16 | DF | BEL | Nael Goeminne |
| 18 | DF | BEL | Juliette Duquesne |
| 20 | FW | BEL | Lauriane Stappaerts |
| 22 | FW | BEL | Joanne Peeters |
| 23 | DF | BEL | Camille Meza Semet |
| 24 | MF | BEL | Sophie Limauge |
| 28 | DF | BEL | Laetitia Goeminne |
| 31 | GK | FRA | Mathilde Petriaux |
