= Louise Versavel =

Belgian field hockey player

Personal information
- Born: 29 April 1995 (age 31)

Sport
- Sport: Field hockey
- Position: Forward
- Club: Braxgata HC
National team
| Years | Team | Caps | Goals |
| 2012– | Belgium | 156 | - |
Medal record
Women's field hockey
Representing Belgium
European Championship
| Silver medal – second place | 2017 Amsterdam |
| Silver medal – second place | 2023 Mönchengladbach |
| Bronze medal – third place | 2021 Amstelveen |

Louise Versavel (born 29 April 1995) is a Belgian female field hockey player who currently plays as an attacker for the Belgium women's national field hockey team.

She has represented Belgium in few international competitions including the 2012-13 Women's FIH Hockey World League and the 2018 Women's Hockey World Cup.

She was also one of the key members of the Belgian team which emerged as runners-up to world champions Netherlands at the 2017 Women's EuroHockey Nations Championship.

== 2018 World Cup ==
She was part of the Belgian squad during the 2018 Women's Hockey World Cup which crashed out of the second round after a penalty shootout defeat against Spain following a goalless full time finish. However, she was the top goalscorer for Belgium during the World Cup campaign with 4 goals and importantly scored 2 goals in the penalty shootout defeat.
