= Alix Gerniers =

Belgian field hockey player

Personal information
- Born: 29 June 1993 (age 33) Ronse, Belgium
- Height: 1.64 m (5 ft 5 in)
- Weight: 58 kg (128 lb)

Sport
- Sport: Field hockey
- Position: Midfielder
- Club: La Gantoise HC
National team
Years	Team	Caps	Goals
–	Belgium	178	-
Medal record
Women's field hockey
Representing Belgium
World Cup
Bronze medal – third place	2026 Wavre/Amstelveen
European Championships
Silver medal – second place	2017 Amstelveen
Silver medal – second place	2023 Mönchengladbach
Bronze medal – third place	2021 Amstelveen

Alix Gerniers (born 29 June 1993) is a Belgian field hockey player. At the 2012 Summer Olympics she competed with the Belgium women's national field hockey team in the women's tournament.

She's a cousin of Belgian professional field hockey player Arthur De Sloover.
