= Stéphanie Vanden Borre =

Belgian field hockey player (born 1997)

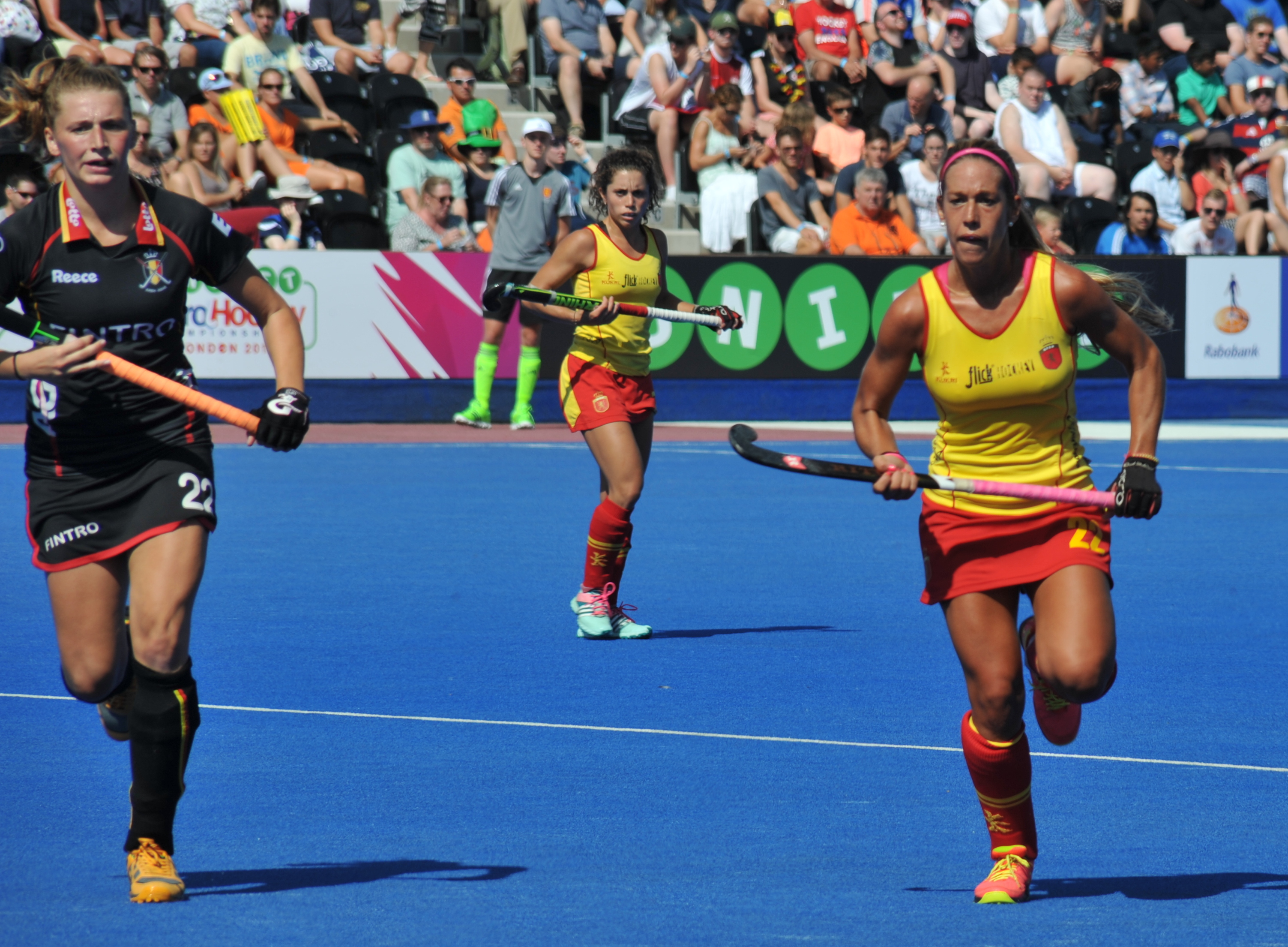
- Belgium v Spain, 2015 Women's EuroHockey Nations Championship (Stéphanie and Gloria Comerma)

Personal information
- Born: 14 September 1997 (age 29)

Sport
- Sport: Field hockey
- Position: Defender
- Club: Braxgata
National team
Years	Team	Caps	Goals
2014-present	Belgium	152	(40)
2014-2016	Belgium U21	15	(5)
Medal record
World Cup
Bronze medal – third place	2026 Wavre/Amstelveen
EuroHockey Championship
Silver medal – second place	2023 Mönchengladbach

Stéphanie Vanden Borre (born 14 September 1997) is a Belgian field hockey player for the Belgian national team.

In January 2014, she made her debut for the Belgian national hockey team during a series of friendly matches against the South African team. With the Belgian team, Vanden Borre won silver at the European Championship in 2017 and bronze in 2021.

She participated at the 2018 Women's Hockey World Cup.
