= Sarah Jamieson =

Sarah Jamieson may refer to:

- Sarah Jamieson (runner)
- Sarah Jamieson (field hockey)
