= Emilia Munitis =

Italian-Argentine field hockey player (born 1996)

Personal information
- Full name: María Emilia García Munitis
- Born: 6 May 1996 (age 30) La Plata, Argentina

Sport
- Sport: Field hockey
- Position: Forward
Senior career
Years	Team	Caps	Goals
–2023	Real Sociedad	-	-
2023–2025	Sanse Complutense	-	-
2025–	Royal Uccle Sport	-	-
National team
Years	Team	Caps	Goals
2019–	Italy	50	(4)
Medal record
Women's field hockey
Representing Italy
FIH Hockey Series
Bronze medal – third place	2018–19 Valencia	Finals
EuroHockey Championship II
Silver medal – second place	2019 Glasgow	Team

María Emilia García Munitis (born 6 May 1996) is an Argentine-born field hockey player who represents the Italy national team.

== Personal life ==
She was born in La Plata, Argentina, to an Italian Argentine family.

== Career ==
=== Domestic ===
Throughout her senior career, Munitis has played in the Spanish and Belgian top leagues, the Liga Iberdrola and the Carlsberg 0.0 Hockey League. She formerly played for Real Sociedad and Sanse Complutense in Spain, and is currently a member of Royal Uccle Sport in Belgium.

Prior to her move to Europe, she also played for River Plate in Argentina.

=== Senior national team ===
Munitis made her international debut in 2019. She earned her first senior cap for Italy during a test match against Scotland in Rome. She won her first medals with the national team later that year, taking home silver at the 2019 EuroHockey Championship II in Glasgow, and bronze at the FIH Series Finals in Valencia.

Since her debut, she has been a constant inclusion in the national squad, appearing in multiple major tournaments. She has appeared at two editions of the EuroHockey Championship, in 2021 in Amstelveen and 2023 in Mönchengladbach. She also competed at the 2022 and 2023–24 editions of the FIH Nations Cup in Valencia and Terrassa, respectively.

She has been named in the squad for the 2026 FIH World Cup Qualifiers in Hyderabad.

== International goals ==
The table lists all international goals scored by Munitis at senior level.

Goal	Date	Location	Opponent	Score	Result	Competition	Ref.
1	4 August 2019	Glasgow National Hockey Centre, Glasgow, Scotland	Wales	2–0	3–1	2019 EuroHockey Championship II	
2	7 August 2019	Glasgow National Hockey Centre, Glasgow, Scotland	Turkey	6–1	10–1	2019 EuroHockey Championship II	
3	9 August 2019	Glasgow National Hockey Centre, Glasgow, Scotland	Austria	4–0	4–0	2019 EuroHockey Championship II	
4	24 August 2023	SparkassenPark, Mönchengladbach, Germany	Scotland	1–0	1–1	2023 EuroHockey Championship	
