= 2024 Women's EuroHockey Club Trophy I =

Women's EuroHockey Club Trophy

2024 Women's EuroHockey Club Trophy
Tournament details
- Host country: Germany
- City: Hamburg
- Dates: 29 March – 1 April
- Teams: 8
- Venue: Club an der Alster

Final positions
- Champions: (England) Surbiton (1st title)
- Runner-up: (Belgium) Dragons
- Third place: (Germany) Club an der Alster

Tournament statistics
- Matches played: 16
- Goals scored: 81 (5.06 per match)
- Top scorer: (Germany) Hanna Granitzki (7 goals)
- Best player: (Argentina) Jimena Cedrés

The 2024 Women's EuroHockey Club Trophy is the 47th edition of the women's Women's EuroHockey Club Trophy, Europe's secondary club field hockey tournament organized by the EHF. It is currently being held from 29 March to 1 April 2024 at Club an der Alster in Hamburg, Germany.

== Teams ==
The following eight teams competed for the title:

- (Belgium) Dragons
- (Czech Republic) Slavia Prague
- (England) Surbiton
- (Germany) Club an der Alster
- (Italy) Butterfly Roma
- (Scotland) Watsonians
- (Switzerland) Rotweiss Wettingen
- (Ukraine) Sumchanka

== Results ==
=== Preliminary round ===
==== Pool A ====
Pos	Team	Pld	W	D	L	GF	GA	GD	Pts	Qualification
1	(Belgium) Dragons	3	3	0	0	8	1	+7	15	Advanced to Final
2	(Ukraine) Sumchanka	3	2	0	1	8	2	+6	11	
3	(Czech Republic) Slavia Prague	3	0	1	2	2	8	−6	2	
4	(Switzerland) Rotweiss Wettingen	3	0	1	2	2	9	−7	2	

Source: EHF
Rules for classification: 1) Points; 2) Goal difference; 3) Goals scored; 4) Games won; 5) Head-to-head.

29 March 2022
10:30

Sumchanka (Ukraine)	4–1	(Czech Republic) Slavia Prague
Mykhailiuk 9'; Rudychenko 18'; Movchan 9'; Shokalenko 21'	Report	Šmídová 15'

Umpires:
Ilaria Amorosini (ITA)
Chloe McCall (WAL)

29 March 2022
12:45

Dragons (Belgium)	4–1	(Switzerland) Rotweiss Wettingen
Magis 4'; De Groof 10'; A. Marien 11'; Gil 37'	Report	R. Müller 42'

Umpires:
Zoe Hall (ENG)
Daniela Kavanova (CZE)

30 March 2022
10:00

Rotweiss Wettingen (Switzerland)	1–1	(Czech Republic) Slavia Prague
Schnyder 37'	Report	Lehovcová 11'

Umpires:
Katie Howie (SCO)
Ilaria Amorosini (ITA)

30 March 2022
12:15

Sumchanka (Ukraine)	0–1	(Belgium) Dragons
	Report	Van Antwerpen 33'

Umpires:
Teresa Lipsky (GER)
Zoe Hall (ENG)

31 March 2022
10:00

Dragons (Belgium)	3–0	(Czech Republic) Slavia Prague
Magis 20', 27', 46'	Report

Umpires:
Zoe Hall (ENG)
Katie Howie (SCO)

31 March 2022
12:15

Rotweiss Wettingen (Switzerland)	0–4	(Ukraine) Sumchanka
	Report	Tanchenko 15'; Voievoda 31', 58'; Shokalenko 52'

Umpires:
Gema Calderón (ESP)
Teresa Lipsky (GER)

==== Pool B ====
Pos	Team	Pld	W	D	L	GF	GA	GD	Pts	Qualification
1	(England) Surbiton	3	3	0	0	14	5	+9	15	Advanced to Final
2	(Germany) Club an der Alster (H)	3	2	0	1	22	5	+17	11	
3	(Scotland) Watsonians	3	1	0	2	4	9	−5	6	
4	(Italy) Butterfly Roma	3	0	0	3	2	23	−21	0	

Source: EHF
Rules for classification: 1) Points; 2) Goal difference; 3) Goals scored; 4) Games won; 5) Head-to-head.
(H) Hosts

29 March 2022
15:00

Surbiton (England)	2–1	(Scotland) Watsonians
Hamilton 2'; Ansley 24'	Report	Jamieson 3'

Umpires:
Gema Calderón (ESP)
Pauline Cuypers (BEL)

29 March 2022
17:15

Club an der Alster (Germany)	12–1	(Italy) Butterfly Roma
Haid 1', 2'; Sippel 3'; Granitzki 6', 18'; Wolbers 9', 12'; Gablać 26'; Huse 38', 42'; Grashoff 43'; Schröder 47'	Report	Grossi 34'

Umpires:
Lisette Baljon (NED)
Daria Hladnieva (UKR)

30 March 2022
14:30

Butterfly Roma (Italy)	0–3	(Scotland) Watsonians
	Report	Jamieson 35'; Dark 42'; Arthur 57'

Umpires:
Pauline Cuypers (BEL)
Daniela Kavanova (CZE)

30 March 2022
16:45

Surbiton (England)	4–3	(Germany) Club an der Alster
Dowthwaite 41'; French 43', 55', 60'	Report	Granitzki 3', 30'; Grashoff 17'

Umpires:
Lisette Baljon (NED)
Gema Calderón (ESP)

31 March 2022
14:30

Club an der Alster (Germany)	7–0	(Scotland) Watsonians
Huse 8', 37'; Gablać 9'; Bleuel 18'; Granitzki 30'; Kerner 43'; Haid 54'	Report

Umpires:
Pauline Cuypers (BEL)
Ilaria Amorosini (ITA)

31 March 2022
16:45

Butterfly Roma (Italy)	1–8	(England) Surbiton
Di Paola 60'	Report	Petter 5', 39', 55'; Hamilton 9', 45'; Ansley 19'; Dowthwaite 53'; Evans 56'

Umpires:
Chloe McCall (WAL)
Lisette Baljon (NED)

=== Classification round ===
==== Seventh and eighth place ====
1 April 2022
09:00

Rotweiss Wettingen (Switzerland)	1–0	(Italy) Butterfly Roma
E. Trösch 35'	Report

Umpires:
Katie Howe (SCO)
Chloe McCall (WAL)

==== Fifth and sixth place ====
1 April 2022
11:15

Slavia Prague (Czech Republic)	2–4	(Scotland) Watsonians
Babická 32'; L. Nová 34'	Report	Drummond 1'; Garden 5'; Dark 9'; Jamieson 58'

Umpires:
Gema Calderón (ESP)
Teresa Lipsky (GER)

==== Third and fourth place ====
1 April 2022
13:30

Sumchanka (Ukraine)	0–5	(Germany) Club an der Alster
	Report	Granitzki 17', 58'; Sippel 32', 34', 51'

Umpires:
Pauline Cuypers (BEL)
Zoe Hall (ENG)

==== Final ====
1 April 2022
15:45

Dragons (Belgium)	3–4	(England) Surbiton
Vilar 24'; Verboven 29'; Magis 57'	Report	Ansley 23'; French 26'; Hamilton 49', 52'

Umpires:
Lisette Baljon (NED)
Ilaria Amorosini (ITA)

== Statistics ==
=== Final standings ===
Pos	Team	Pld	W	D	L	GF	GA	GD	Pts	Final result
1	(England) Surbiton	4	4	0	0	18	8	+10	20	Gold medal
2	(Belgium) Dragons	4	3	0	1	11	5	+6	16	Silver medal
3	(Germany) Club an der Alster (H)	4	3	0	1	27	5	+22	16	Bronze medal
4	(Ukraine) Sumchanka	4	2	0	2	8	7	+1	11	
5	(Scotland) Watsonians	4	2	0	2	9	11	−2	11	
6	(Czech Republic) Slavia Prague	4	0	1	3	4	12	−8	3	
7	(Switzerland) Rotweiss Wettingen	4	1	1	2	3	9	−6	7	
8	(Italy) Butterfly Roma	4	0	0	4	2	24	−22	1	

Source: EHF
(H) Hosts

=== Top Goalscorers ===
Goalscoring Table
Pos.	Player	Club	FG	PC	PS	Total
1	(Germany) Hanna Granitzki	Club an der Alster	4	3	0	7
2	(Netherlands) Valerie Magis	Dragons	0	3	2	5
2	(England) Sophie Hamilton	Surbiton	5	0	0	5
4	(England) Hannah French	Surbiton	2	2	0	4
4	(Germany) Viktoria Huse	Club an der Alster	0	0	4	4
4	(Germany) Carlotta Sippel	Club an der Alster	2	2	0	4
7	(England) Giselle Ansley	Surbiton	1	2	0	2
7	(England) Isabelle Petter	Surbiton	2	1	0	2
7	(Germany) Katharina Haid	Club an der Alster	3	0	0	2
7	(Scotland) Sarah Jamieson	Watsonians	3	0	0	2

== See also ==
- 2024 Men's EuroHockey Club Trophy I
- 2024 Women's Euro Hockey League
