= 2019 Women's EuroHockey Championship II =

2019 Women's EuroHockey Championship second statistics and finals are shown here

Tournament details
- Host country: Scotland
- City: Glasgow
- Dates: 4–10 August
- Teams: 8 (from 1 confederation)
- Venue: Glasgow National Hockey Centre

Final positions
- Champions: Scotland (3rd title)
- Runner-up: Italy
- Third place: Poland

Tournament statistics
- Matches played: 20
- Goals scored: 103 (5.15 per match)
- Top scorer(s): (Czech Republic) Veronika Decsyová (Poland) Magdalena Zagajska (5 goals)

The 2019 Women's EuroHockey Championship II was the eighth edition of the Women's EuroHockey Championship II, the second level of the European field hockey championships organized by the EHF.

It was held from the 4th until the 10th of August 2019 at the Glasgow National Hockey Centre in Glasgow, Scotland. The tournament also served as a direct qualifier for the 2021 Women's EuroHockey Nations Championship, with the winner, Scotland, and runner-up, Italy, qualifying.

== Qualified teams ==
The following eight teams, shown with pre-tournament world rankings, competed in the tournament.

Event	Dates	Location	Quotas	Qualifier(s)
2017 EuroHockey Championship	18–26 August 2017	Amstelveen, Netherlands	2	Czech Republic (21); Scotland (19)
2017 EuroHockey Championship II	6–12 August 2017	Cardiff, Wales	5	Italy (17); Wales (26); Poland (24); Ukraine (27); Austria (31)
2017 EuroHockey Championship III	30 July – 5 August	Sveti Ivan Zelina, Croatia	1	Turkey (33)
Total			8	

== Format ==
The eight teams were split into two groups of four teams. The top two teams advanced to the semi-finals to determine the winner in a knockout system. The bottom two teams played in a new group with the teams they did not play against in the group stage. The last two teams are relegated to the EuroHockey Championship III.

== Results ==
All times are local, BST (UTC+1).

=== Preliminary round ===
==== Pool A ====
Pos	Team	Pld	W	D	L	GF	GA	GD	Pts	Qualification
1	Italy	3	2	1	0	13	2	+11	7	Advance to the semi-finals
2	Poland	3	1	2	0	8	2	+6	5	Advance to the semi-finals
3	Wales	3	1	1	1	8	6	+2	4	Transfer to pool C
4	Turkey	3	0	0	3	2	21	−19	0	Transfer to pool C

Source: FIH
Rules for classification: 1) points; 2) matches won; 3) goal difference; 4) goals for; 5) head-to-head result; 6) field goals for.

4 August 2019
10:15

Italy	3–1	Wales
Oviedo 28'; Munitis 38'; Carta 50'	Report	Webb 57'

Umpires:
Carly Edwards (SCO)
Rachel Williams (ENG)

4 August 2019
12:30

Poland	6–0	Turkey
Wiśniewska 11'; Zagajska 15', 48'; Slawinska 43'; Mazur 44'; Katerla 46'	Report

Umpires:
Violeta Eismayer (AUT)
Smidova Stepanka (CZE)

5 August 2019
15:45

Wales	5–1	Turkey
Jones 1'; Richards 31'; Jordan 48'; Hughes 51'; Wilkinson 58'	Report	Kücükkoç 35'

Umpires:
Ilaria Amorosini (ITA)
Olena Klymenko (UKR)

5 August 2019
18:00

Poland	0–0	Italy
	Report

Umpires:
Stepanka Smidova (CZE)
Cathy Wright (WAL)

7 August 2019
12:15

Italy	10–1	Turkey
Oviedo 8', 30'; Ruggieri 18', 36'; Pessina 41'; Munitis 44'; Vynohradova 46'; Tiddi 48', 49'; Cesanelli 53'	Report	Öztürk 22'

Umpires:
Carly Edwards (SCO)
Olena Klymenko (UKR)

7 August 2019
14:30

Wales	2–2	Poland
Jones 28'; Wilkinson 60'	Report	Zagajska 15'; Blaszyk 32'

Umpires:
Violeta Eismayer (AUT)
Alexandra Mahieu (BEL)

==== Pool B ====
Pos	Team	Pld	W	D	L	GF	GA	GD	Pts	Qualification
1	Scotland (H)	3	3	0	0	13	2	+11	9	Advance to the semi-finals
2	Austria	3	1	1	1	4	6	−2	4	Advance to the semi-finals
3	Ukraine	3	1	0	2	5	12	−7	3	Transfer to pool C
4	Czech Republic	3	0	1	2	7	9	−2	1	Transfer to pool C

Source: FIH
Rules for classification: 1) points; 2) matches won; 3) goal difference; 4) goals for; 5) head-to-head result; 6) field goals for.
(H) Hosts

4 August 2019
14:45

Scotland	7–0	Ukraine
Watson 3'; Lanigan 7', 48'; Cuthbert 20', 55'; Burnet 24'; Dark 45'	Report

Umpires:
Alexandra Mahieu (BEL)
Cath Wright (WAL)

4 August 2019
17:00

Czech Republic	2–2	Austria
Nováková 33'; Decsyová 58'	Report	Laginja 23'; Zerbs 60+'

Umpires:
Ilaria Amorosini (ITA)
Lisette Baljon (NED)

6 August 2019
15:45

Ukraine	1–2	Austria
Shevchenko 19'	Report	Matousek 37'; Konrat 56'

Umpires:
Lisette Baljon (NED)
Alexandra Mahieu (BEL)

6 August 2019
18:00

Czech Republic	2–3	Scotland
Lehovcová 49'; Decsyová 53'	Report	Costello 32'; Cuthbert 39'; Campbell 50'

Umpires:
Violeta Eismayer (AUT)
Rachel Williams (ENG)

7 August 2019
16:45

Ukraine	4–3	Czech Republic
Kernoz 6'; Stetsenko 21', 43'; O.Honcharenko 60'	Report	Lehovcová 9'; Vorlova 48'; Decsyová 60'

Umpires:
Lisette Baljon (NED)
Cathy Wright (WAL)

7 August 2019
19:00

Scotland	3–0	Austria
Eadie 8'; Jamieson 11'; Holmes 16'	Report

Umpires:
Ilaria Amorosini (ITA)
Rachel Williams (ENG)

=== Fifth to eighth place classification ===
==== Pool C ====
The points obtained in the preliminary round against the other team are taken over.

Pos	Team	Pld	W	D	L	GF	GA	GD	Pts	Relegation
5	Wales	3	2	0	1	13	6	+7	6	
6	Czech Republic	3	2	0	1	10	7	+3	6	
7	Ukraine (R)	3	2	0	1	12	12	0	6	Relegation to the Championship III
8	Turkey (R)	3	0	0	3	5	15	−10	0	Relegation to the Championship III

Source: FIH
Rules for classification: 1) points; 2) matches won; 3) goal difference; 4) goals for; 5) head-to-head result; 6) field goals for.
(R) Relegated

9 August 2019
14:30

Wales	7–3	Ukraine
French 2'; Wilkinson 4'; Hughes 10', 53'; Westwood 35'; Robinson 51'; Marke-Jones 59'	Report	Kernoz 16'; Honcharenko 44', 45+'

Umpires:
Liaria Amorosini (ITA)
Stepanka Smidova (CZE)

9 August 2019
16:50

Turkey	2–5	Czech Republic
Yilmaz 8'; Küçükkoç 42'	Report	Lehovcová 1', 47'; Mejzlikova 39'; Laciná 56'; Reichlova 57'

Umpires:
Violeta Eismayer (AUT)
Olena Klymenko (UKR)

10 August 2019
09:30

Wales	1–2	Czech Republic
Hughes 23'	Report	Decsyova 32', 35'

Umpires:
Lisette Baljon (NED)
Alexandra Mahieu (BEL)

10 August 2019
11:45

Ukraine	5–2	Turkey
Kurovska 39'; Vorushylo 50'; Shevchenko 52', 58'; Stetsenko 60'	Report	Köşker 17'; Esen 48'

Umpires:
Liaria Amorosini (ITA)
Cthy Wright (WAL)

=== First to fourth place classification ===
Semi-finals
9 August
Italy	4
Austria	0
9 August
Scotland	3
Poland	0

Final
10 August
Italy	1
Scotland	2
Third place
10 August
Austria	2
Poland	4

==== Semi-finals ====
9 August 2019
14:45

Italy	4–0	Austria
Pessina 16'; Singh 22'; Vynohradova 35'; Munitis 53'	Report

Umpires:
Alexandra Mahieu (BEL)
Rachel Williams (ENG)

9 August 2019
17:00

Scotland	3–0	Poland
Dark 2'; Cuthbert 12'; Campbell 30'	Report

Umpires:
Lisett Baljon (NED)
Cathy Wright (WAL)

==== Third and fourth place ====
10 August 2019
14:00

Austria	2–4	Poland
Steyrer 34'; Czech 40'	Report	Zagajska 29', 50'; Mazur 38'; Blaszyk 60'

Umpires:
Olena Klymenko (UKR)
Stepanka Smidova (CZE)

==== Final ====
10 August 2019
16:15

Italy	1–2	Scotland
Bianchi 59'	Report	Jamieson 6'; Watson 57'

Umpires:
Violeta Eismayer (AUT)
Rachel Williams (ENG)

== Statistics ==
=== Final standings ===
Rank	Team
Gold medal	Scotland
Silver medal	Italy
Bronze medal	Poland
4	Austria
5	Wales
6	Czech Republic
7	Ukraine
8	Turkey

Qualified for the 2021 EuroHockey Championship

Relegated to the EuroHockey Championship III

=== Goalscorers ===
There were 103 goals scored in 20 matches, for an average of 5.15 goals per match.

5 goals

- (Czech Republic) Veronika Decsyová
- (Poland) Magdalena Zagajska

4 goals

- (Czech Republic) Adéla Lehovcová
- (Scotland) Kareena Cuthbert
- (Wales) Xenna Hughes

3 goals

- (Italy) Emilia Munitis
- (Italy) Lara Oviedo
- (Ukraine) Olha Honcharenko
- (Ukraine) Viktoriia Stetsenko
- (Wales) Leah Wilkinson

2 goals

- (Italy) Ivanna Pessina
- (Italy) Giuliana Ruggieri
- (Italy) Chiara Tiddi
- (Italy) Maryna Vynohradova
- (Poland) Wiktoria Blaszyk
- (Poland) Dżesika Mazur
- (Scotland) Louise Campbell
- (Scotland) Sarah Jamieson
- (Scotland) Lucy Lanigan
- (Scotland) Charlotte Watson
- (Turkey) Perihan Kücükkoç
- (Ukraine) Yevheniya Kernoz
- (Ukraine) Yuliia Shevchenko
- (Wales) Sarah Jones

1 goal

- (Austria) Johanna Czech
- (Austria) Ruth Konrat
- (Austria) Marta Laginja
- (Austria) Nathalie Matousek
- (Austria) Lisa Steyrer
- (Austria) Corinna Zerbs
- (Czech Republic) Kateřina Laciná
- (Czech Republic) Tereza Mejzlikova
- (Czech Republic) Veronika Nováková
- (Czech Republic) Jindriska Reichlova
- (Czech Republic) Anna Vorlova
- (Italy) Eugenia Bianchi
- (Italy) Federica Carta
- (Italy) Sofia Cesanelli
- (Italy) Jasbeer Singh
- (Poland) Amelia Katerla
- (Poland) Paula Slawinska
- (Poland) Natalia Wiśniewska
- (Scotland) Fiona Burnet
- (Scotland) Amy Costello
- (Scotland) Emily Dark
- (Scotland) Jennifer Eadie
- (Scotland) Kate Holmes
- (Turkey) Ayla Esen
- (Turkey) Melis Köşker
- (Turkey) Leyla Öztürk
- (Turkey) Pinar Yilmaz
- (Ukraine) Olha Kurovska
- (Ukraine) Yana Vorushylo
- (Wales) Sian French
- (Wales) Danni Jordan
- (Wales) Natasha Marke-Jones
- (Wales) Phoebe Richards
- (Wales) Sophie Robinson
- (Wales) Isobel Webb
- (Wales) Joanne Westwood

Source: FIH

== See also ==
- 2019 Men's EuroHockey Championship II
- 2019 Women's EuroHockey Championship III
- 2019 Women's EuroHockey Nations Championship
