= 2022 Women's EuroHockey Club Trophy =

Women's EuroHockey Club Trophy

Tournament details
- Host country: Italy
- City: Cernusco sul Naviglio
- Dates: 15–18 April
- Teams: 7
- Venue: HC Argentia

Final positions
- Champions: (Belgium) Dragons (1st title)
- Runner-up: (Germany) Mannheimer
- Third place: (England) East Grinstead

Tournament statistics
- Matches played: 12
- Goals scored: 70 (5.83 per match)
- Top scorer: (England) Elena Rayer (6 goals)
- Best player: (Belgium) Jimena Cedrés

The 2022 Women's EuroHockey Club Trophy will be the 45th edition of the women's Women's EuroHockey Club Trophy, Europe's secondary club field hockey tournament organized by the EHF. It will be held from 15 to 18 April 2022 at HC Argentia in Cernusco sul Naviglio, Italy.

== Teams ==
The following seven teams will compete for the title:

- (Belgium) Dragons
- (England) East Grinstead
- (France) Lille
- (Germany) Mannheimer
- (Italy) Argentia
- (Switzerland) Olten
- (Ukraine) Sumchanka
- HC Victoria of Belarus qualified for the tournament, however they were excluded by the European Hockey Federation as a result of the 2022 Russian invasion of Ukraine.

== Results ==
=== Preliminary round ===
==== Pool A ====
Pos	Team	Pld	W	D	L	GF	GA	GD	Pts	Qualification
1	(Germany) Mannheimer	2	2	0	0	14	2	+12	10	Advance to Final
2	(Italy) Argentia (H)	2	1	0	1	3	4	−1	5	
3	(France) Lille	2	0	0	2	3	14	−11	1	

Source: EHF
Rules for classification: 1) Points; 2) Goal difference; 3) Goals scored; 4) Games won; 5) Head-to-head.
(H) Hosts

15 April 2022
18:45

Mannheimer (Germany)	3–0	(Italy) Argentia
Schmidt 35', 59'; Seidel 39'	Report

Umpires:
Olena Zhakupova (UKR)
Karine Alves Pereira (FRA)

16 April 2022
16:45

Lille (France)	2–11	(Germany) Mannheimer
Fernández-Merlo 7'; Canon 23'	Report	Von der Heyde 4'; Knobloch 6', 11', 22', 41'; Hendrix 10', 32'; Schmidt 18', 45'; Von Velsen 47'; Mayerhöfer 53'

Umpires:
Miriam Gerö (AUT)
Rebecca Woodcock (ENG)

17 April 2022
15:45

Argentia (Italy)	3–1	(France) Lille
Grenon 1'; Manzoni 22'; De Biase 52'	Report	Delemazure 23'

Umpires:
Rebecca Woodcock (ENG)
Alexandra Mahieu (BEL)

==== Pool B ====
Pos	Team	Pld	W	D	L	GF	GA	GD	Pts	Qualification
1	(Belgium) Dragons	3	3	0	0	15	2	+13	15	Advance to Final
2	(England) East Grinstead	3	2	0	1	9	6	+3	11	
3	(Ukraine) Sumchanka	3	1	0	2	11	8	+3	6	
4	(Switzerland) Olten	3	0	0	3	2	21	−19	1	

Source: EHF
Rules for classification: 1) Points; 2) Goal difference; 3) Goals scored; 4) Games won; 5) Head-to-head.

15 April 2022
14:15

East Grinstead (England)	5–2	(Ukraine) Sumchanka
Bray 9'; Rayer 38', 51', 55'; Bowden 41'	Report	Leonova 22'; O. Kurovska 49'

Umpires:
Ymkje van Slooten (NED)
Miriam Gerö (AUT)

15 April 2022
16:30

Dragons (Belgium)	10–0	(Switzerland) Olten
Cedrés 4'; Raye 7', 49'; Simons 8', 11'; Vilar 32'; Verboven 41'; Jakus 52', 55'; Roumen 56'	Report

Umpires:
Noemi Di Bella (ITA)
Sandra Wagner (GER)

16 April 2022
12:15

Olten (Switzerland)	1–8	(Ukraine) Sumchanka
Schoemaker 5'	Report	Leonova 4', 49'; Shevchenko 7', 17', 60'; Ponomarenko 43'; Honcharenko 44'; Stetsenko 60'

Umpires:
Alexandra Mahieu (BEL)
Noemi Di Bella (ITA)

16 April 2022
14:30

East Grinstead (England)	1–3	(Belgium) Dragons
Rayer 24'	Report	Roumen 37'; De Groof 45'; Raye 48'

Umpires:
Karine Alves Pereira (FRA)
Ymkje van Slooten (NED)

17 April 2022
11:15

Dragons (Belgium)	2–1	(Ukraine) Sumchanka
Raye 6'; Cedrés 32'	Report	Leonova 18'

Umpires:
Sandra Wagner (GER)
Noemi Di Bella (ITA)

17 April 2022
13:30

Olten (Switzerland)	1–3	(England) East Grinstead
Schärer 54'	Report	Bray 1'; Bowden 19'; Cozens 29'

Umpires:
Olena Zhakupova (UKR)
Ymkje van Slooten (NED)

=== Classification round ===
==== Fifth and sixth place ====
18 April 2022
09:45

Lille (France)	1–3	(Ukraine) Sumchanka
Berger 53'	Report	Stetsenko 12', 37'; Voievoda 25'

Umpires:
Miriam Gerö (AUT)
Sandra Wagner (GER)

==== Third and fourth place ====
18 April 2022
12:00

Argentia (Italy)	2–6	(England) East Grinstead
De Biase 7', 17'	Report	Bray 13', 15', 50'; Fernández 30'; Rayer 34', 57'

Umpires:
Alexandra Mahieu (BEL)
Karine Alves Pereira (FRA)

==== Final ====
18 April 2022
14:15

Mannheimer (Germany)	0–1	(Belgium) Dragons
	Report	De Groof 7'

Umpires:
Ymkje van Slooten (NED)
Rebecca Woodcock (ENG)

== Awards ==
Top Goalscorer	Player of the Tournament	Goalkeeper of the Tournament
(England) Elena Rayer	(Belgium) Jimena Cedrés	(Ukraine) Tetiana Stepanchenko

== Statistics ==
=== Final standings ===
Pos	Team	Pld	W	D	L	GF	GA	GD	Pts	Final result
1	(Belgium) Dragons	4	4	0	0	16	2	+14	12	Gold medal
2	(Germany) Mannheimer	3	2	0	1	14	3	+11	6	Silver medal
3	(England) East Grinstead	4	3	0	1	15	8	+7	9	Bronze medal
4	(Italy) Argentia (H)	3	1	0	2	5	10	−5	1	
5	(Ukraine) Sumchanka	4	2	0	2	14	9	+5	5	
6	(France) Lille	3	0	0	3	4	17	−13	−1	
7	(Switzerland) Olten	3	0	0	3	2	21	−19	−2	

Source: EHF
(H) Hosts

=== Top Goalscorers ===
Goalscoring Table
Pos.	Player	Club	FG	PC	PS	Total
1	(England) Elena Rayer	East Grinstead	3	2	1	6
2	(England) Sophie Bray	East Grinstead	3	2	0	5
3	(Belgium) Abigail Raye	Dragons	4	0	0	4
3	(Germany) Merle Knobloch	Mannheimer	3	1	0	4
3	(Germany) Isabella Schmidt	Mannheimer	4	0	0	4
3	(Ukraine) Karyna Leonova	Sumchanka	3	1	0	4
7	(Italy) Pilar De Biase	Argentia	1	1	1	3
7	(Ukraine) Yuliia Shevchenko	Sumchanka	2	1	0	3
7	(Ukraine) Viktoriia Stetsenko	Sumchanka	3	0	0	3
