= 2026 Women's Euro Hockey League =

European field hockey tournament

Tournament details
- Host country: Netherlands
- City: 's-Hertogenbosch
- Dates: 1–6 April
- Teams: 12 (from 8 associations)
- Venue: Sportpark Oosterplas

Final positions
- Champions: (Netherlands) SCHC (1st title)
- Runner-up: (Netherlands) Den Bosch
- Third place: (Germany) Mannheimer HC

Tournament statistics
- Matches played: 16
- Goals scored: 73 (4.56 per match)
- Top scorer: Frédérique Matla (Den Bosch) (8 goals)

The 2026 Women's Euro Hockey League was the sixth edition of the Women's Euro Hockey League, Europe's premier women's club field hockey tournament, organized by the European Hockey Federation.

The tournament was hosted by HC 's-Hertogenbosch alongside the men's final eight at Sportpark Oosterplas in 's-Hertogenbosch, Netherlands from 1 to 6 April 2025. The hosts Den Bosch were the defending champions, having won a record third title at the previous edition. They did not defend their title as they were beaten 1–0 in the final by SCHC, it was SCHC their first title. Mannheimer HC won the bronze medal by defeating Club de Campo 3–2.

== Association team allocation ==
A total of 12 teams from 8 of the 45 EHF member associations participated in the 2025 Women's Euro Hockey League. The association rankings based on the EHL country coefficients were used to determine the number of participating teams for each association:

- Associations 1–4 each had two teams qualify.
- Associations 5–8 each had one team qualify.

=== Teams ===
The labels in the parentheses show how each teams qualified for the place of its starting round:

- 1st, 2nd: League positions of the previous season
- RS: Regular season winners

Qualified teams for 2026 Women's Euro Hockey League
Entry round	Teams	
Quarter-finals	(Netherlands) Den Bosch (1st)	(Belgium) Braxgata (1st)
Quarter-finals	(Germany) Harvestehuder THC (1st)	(Spain) Club de Campo (1st)
Preliminary round	(Netherlands) SCHC (2nd)	(Belgium) Gantoise (2nd)
Preliminary round	(Germany) Mannheimer HC (2nd)	(Spain) Club Egara (CW)
Preliminary round	(England) Reading (1st)	(Ireland) Railway Union (1st)
Preliminary round	(Scotland) Watsonians (1st)	(Czech Republic) Slavia Prague (1st)

== Results ==
The draw was held on 12 October, and the schedule was announced on 17 October 2025.

=== Bracket ===
Preliminary round
1 April
(Czech Republic) Slavia Prague	0
(Belgium) Gantoise	9
1 April
(Ireland) Railway Union	1
(Scotland) Watsonians	6
1 April
(England) Reading	0
(Germany) Mannheimer HC	4
1 April
(Netherlands) SCHC	6
(Spain) Club Egara	1

Quarter-finals
2 April
(Belgium) Gantoise	0 (5)
(Spain) Club de Campo (s.o.)	0 (6)
2 April
(Netherlands) Den Bosch	6
(Scotland) Watsonians	0
3 April
(Germany) Harvestehuder THC	0
(Germany) Mannheimer HC	3
3 April
(Netherlands) SCHC	4
(Belgium) Braxgata	0

Semi-finals
4 April
(Spain) Club de Campo	1
(Netherlands) Den Bosch	5
4 April
(Germany) Mannheimer HC	0
(Netherlands) SCHC	3

Final
6 April
(Netherlands) Den Bosch	0
(Netherlands) SCHC	1
Bronze medal match
6 April
(Spain) Club de Campo	2
(Germany) Mannheimer HC	3

=== Preliminary round ===
1 April 2026
12:45

Railway Union (Ireland)	1–6	(Scotland) Watsonians
Ferry 24'	Report	Park 6'; Jamieson 15'; Holdgate 24'; Dark 30+'; Berndes-Cade 39', 58'

Umpires:
Dan Barstow (ENG)
Pauline Cuypers (BEL)

1 April 2026
15:00

Slavia Prague (Czech Republic)	0–9	(Belgium) Gantoise
	Report	Gerniers 4'; S. Vanden Borre 7'; Ballenghien 13', 22', 26', 31', 37'; Pastor 40'; McLoughlin 57'

Umpires:
Ana Ortega (ESP)
Lorijn de Kraker (NED)

1 April 2026
17:15

Reading (England)	0–4	(Germany) Mannheimer HC
	Report	Hemmerle 26'; Wanner 41' von der Heyde 49'; Kanler 59'

Umpires:
Alison Keogh (IRL)
Michaël Pontus (BEL)

1 April 2026
19:30

SCHC (Netherlands)	6–1	(Spain) Club Egara
Jansen 18', 21', 38', 44' de Waard 28'; J. Dicke 60'	Report	Vilanova 29'

Umpires:
Sarah Wilson (SCO)
Jamie Telfer (SCO)

=== Quarter-finals ===
2 April 2026
17:15

Gantoise (Belgium)	0–0	(Spain) Club de Campo
	Report
Penalties
McLoughlin (penalty shoot-out scored); S. Vanden Borre (penalty shoot-out scored); Van der Geld (penalty shoot-out scored); Gerniers (penalty shoot-out missed); A. Vanden Borre (penalty shoot-out scored); McLoughlin (penalty shoot-out scored); Ballenghien (penalty shoot-out missed)	5–6	(penalty shoot-out scored) F. Amundson; (penalty shoot-out scored) Abajo Sáenz de Tejada; (penalty shoot-out missed) Be. Pérez; (penalty shoot-out scored) Agulló; (penalty shoot-out scored) García; (penalty shoot-out scored) García; (penalty shoot-out scored) F. Amundson

Umpires:
Sarah Wilson (SCO)
Lorijn de Kraker (NED)

2 April 2026
19:30

Den Bosch (Netherlands)	6–0	(Scotland) Watsonians
Matla 3', 19', 26', 42', 50' de Wit 11'	Report

Umpires:
Alison Keogh (IRL)
Pauline Cuypers (BEL)

3 April 2026
13:15

Harvestehuder THC (Germany)	0–3	(Germany) Mannheimer HC
	Report	Gerstenhöfer 30'; Kanler 34'; Seidel 58'

Umpires:
Ivona Makar (CRO)
Lorijn de Kraker (NED)

3 April 2026
15:30

SCHC (Netherlands)	4–0	(Belgium) Braxgata
van den Heuvel 28', 40'; P. Dicke 51'; Jansen 56'	Report

Umpires:
Raphaël Adrien (GER)
Ana Ortega (ESP)

=== Ranking matches ===
2 April 2026
10:30

Railway Union (Ireland)	3–2	(Czech Republic) Slavia Prague
Gowing 2'; Quinn 19'; Errico 38'	Report	Fuxová 42'; Vitošková 56'

Umpires:
Michaël Pontus (BEL)
Jamie Telfer

3 April 2026
11:00

Reading (England)	2–1	(Spain) Club Egara
Jones 21', 50'	Report	Herrero 8'

Umpires:
Michaël Pontus (BEL)
Benjamin Messerli (SUI)

4 April 2026
13:45

Gantoise (Belgium)	5–1	(Scotland) Watsonians
S. Vanden Borre 19', 32', 55'; Van Hecke 45'; Van den Abeele 58'	Report	Dark 60'

Umpires:
Benjamin Messerli (SUI)
Lorijn de Kraker (NED)

5 April 2026
10:15

Harvestehuder THC (Germany)	2–2	(Belgium) Braxgata
Buchta 8'; Green 29'	Report	McEwan 9', 42'
Penalties
Landshut (penalty shoot-out scored); Poppe (penalty shoot-out scored); Plüth (penalty shoot-out missed); Martin-Pelegrina (penalty shoot-out missed); Bauer (penalty shoot-out missed)	2–3	(penalty shoot-out scored) Hawkshaw; (penalty shoot-out scored) Versavel; (penalty shoot-out missed) Belis; (penalty shoot-out scored) Geerts

Umpires:
Sarah Wilson (SCO)
Ana Ortega (ESP)

=== Semi-finals ===
4 April 2026
16:00

Club de Campo (Spain)	1–5	(Netherlands) Den Bosch
Mejías 41'	Report	Matla 22', 45', 48'; De Wit 45'; Koolen 49'

Umpires:
Ivona Makar (CRO)
Jamie Telfer (SCO)

4 April 2026
18:15

Mannheimer HC (Germany)	0–3	(Netherlands) SCHC
	Report	P. Dicke 1', 13'; J. Dicke 7'

Umpires:
Dan Barstow (ENG)
Ana Ortega (ESP)

=== Bronze medal match ===
6 April 2026
09:15

Club de Campo (Spain)	2–3	(Germany) Mannheimer HC
Bl. Pérez 4'; Barrios 46'	Report	Hemmerle 24'; Gerstenhöfer 26'; Kurz 56'

Umpires:
Michaël Pontus (BEL)
Pauline Cuypers (BEL)

=== Final ===
6 April 2026
13:45

Den Bosch (Netherlands)	0–1	(Netherlands) SCHC
	Report	Jansen 45'

== Top goalscorers ==
Rank	Player	Team	FG	PC	PS	Goals
1	(Netherlands) Frédérique Matla	(Netherlands) Den Bosch	2	5	1	8
2	(Netherlands) Yibbi Jansen	(Netherlands) SCHC	0	6	0	6
3	(Belgium) Ambre Ballenghien	(Belgium) Gantoise	3	1	1	5
4	(Belgium) Stéphanie Vanden Borre	(Belgium) Gantoise	0	4	0	4
5	(Netherlands) Pien Dicke	(Netherlands) SCHC	2	1	0	3

== See also ==
- 2026 Women's EuroHockey Club Trophy I
- 2026 Women's EuroHockey Indoor Club Cup
