= 2025–26 Men's Euro Hockey League =

Field hockey tournament

Tournament details
- Host countries: Spain; Netherlands
- Dates: 9 October 2025 – 6 April 2026
- Teams: 20 (from 11 associations)
- Venue: 2 (in 2 host cities)

Final positions
- Champions: (Netherlands) Kampong (2nd title)
- Runner-up: (Belgium) Gantoise
- Third place: (Netherlands) Amsterdam

Tournament statistics
- Matches played: 26
- Goals scored: 153 (5.88 per match)
- Top scorer: Kane Russell (Hamburger Polo Club) (7 goals)

The 2025–26 Men's Euro Hockey League was the 19th edition of the Men's Euro Hockey League, Europe's men's premier club field hockey tournament organized by the European Hockey Federation.

The first round was held from 9 to 12 October 2025 in Barcelona, Spain and the final 8 was held from 2 to 6 April 2026 in 's-Hertogenbosch, Netherlands.

Gantoise were the defending champions, having won their first title in the previous season. They did not defend their title as they were beaten 3–2 by Kampong in the final, it was Kampong their second title. Amsterdam won the bronze medal by defeating Club de Campo 4–3 in a shoot-out after the match finished 2–2.

== Association team allocation ==
A total of 20 teams from 40 of the 42 EHF member associations participated in the 2025–26 Men's Euro Hockey League (the exceptions being Belarus and Russia which are currently suspended). The association ranking based on the EHL men's ranking table was used to determine the number of participating teams for each association:

- Associations 1–3 each had three teams qualify.
- Associations 4–6 each had two teams qualify.
- Associations 7–11 each had one team qualify.

=== Association ranking ===
The associations were allocated places for the 2025–26 Euro Hockey League according to their 2024–25 EHL country coefficients, considering their performance in European competitions from 2022–23 to 2024–25.

Association ranking for the 2025–26 Men's Euro Hockey League: Rank / Change / Association / Points / Teams; 1 / Steady / Netherlands / 47,334 / 3; 2 / Steady / Belgium / 37,000 / 3; 3 / Steady / England / 33,167 / 3; 4 / ▲1 / Germany / 29,667 / 2; 5 / ▼1 / Spain / 28,833 / 2; 6 / ▲1 / France / 23,750 / 2; 7 / ▲1 / Ireland / 21,750 / 1; 8 / ▼2 / Austria / 20,125 / 1; 9 / Steady / Scotland / 18,375 / 1; 10 / ▲1 / Czech Republic / 14,625 / 1; Rank / Change / Association / Points / Teams; 11 / ▼1 / Switzerland / 11,875 / 1; 12 / ▲2 / Portugal / 8,750 / 0; 13 / ▲4 / Italy / 7,750 / 0; 14 / ▼1 / Ukraine / 7,500 / 0; 15 / ▼3 / Wales / 5,375 / 0; 16 / ▼1 / Denmark / 4,875 / 0; 17 / ▲2 / Poland / 3,500 / 0; 18 / ▼2 / Turkey / 2,375 / 0; 19 / ▼1 / Croatia / 1,500 / 0

=== Teams ===
The labels in the parentheses show how each teams qualified for the place of its starting round:

- 1st, 2nd, 3rd: League positions of the previous season
- RS: Regular season winners
- CW: Cup winners

Qualified teams for 2025–26 Men's Euro Hockey League
Entry round	Teams	
Quarter-finals	(Netherlands) Amsterdam (1st)	(Belgium) Gantoise (1st)
Quarter-finals	(England) Surbiton (1st)	(Germany) Crefelder HTC (1st)
Preliminary round	(Netherlands) Kampong (2nd)	(Netherlands) Bloemendaal (RS)
Preliminary round	(Belgium) Léopold (2nd)	(Belgium) Braxgata (3rd)
Preliminary round	(England) Old Georgians (2nd)	(England) Wimbledon (3rd)
Preliminary round	(Germany) Hamburger Polo Club (RS)	(Spain) Real Club de Polo (1st)
Preliminary round	(Spain) Club de Campo (CW)	(France) CAM 92 (1st)
Preliminary round	(France) Saint Germain (2nd)	(Austria) HC Wien (1st)
Preliminary round	(Ireland) Banbridge (1st)	(Scotland) Western Wildcats (1st)
Preliminary round	(Czech Republic) Slavia Prague (1st)	(Switzerland) Olten (1st)

== Preliminary round ==
The preliminary round was hosted by Real Club de Polo de Barcelona at the Camp Eduardo Dualde in Barcelona, Spain from 9 to 12 October 2025. The draw took place on 15 July 2025 and the schedule was announced on 17 July 2025. The winners of the second round advanced to the quarter-finals during Easter 2026.

=== Bracket ===
First round
9 October
(France) Saint Germain	3
(Czech Republic) Slavia Prague	1
9 October
(England) Wimbledon	2
(Germany) Hamburger Polo Club	4
9 October
(Spain) Club de Campo	2
(France) CAM 92	0
9 October
(Austria) HC Wien	1
(Belgium) Léopold	13
11 October
(Netherlands) Kampong	4
(Spain) Real Club de Polo	2
11 October
(Scotland) Western Wildcats	0
(Belgium) Braxgata	7
11 October
(England) Old Georgians	11
(Switzerland) Olten	0
11 October
(Ireland) Banbridge	0
(Netherlands) Bloemendaal	7

Second round
10 October
(France) Saint Germain	2
(Germany) Hamburger Polo Club	7
10 October
(Spain) Club de Campo (s.o.)	1 (4)
(Belgium) Léopold	1 (3)
12 October
(Netherlands) Kampong	5
(Belgium) Braxgata	0
12 October
(England) Old Georgians (s.o.)	2 (3)
(Netherlands) Bloemendaal	2 (1)

=== First round ===
9 October 2025
11:15

Saint Germain (France)	3–1	(Czech Republic) Slavia Prague
Assoignon 4'; F. Goyet 11'; Rogeau 17'	Report	Toms 60'

Umpires:
Raphaël Adrien (GER)
Michael Dutrieux (BEL)

9 October 2025
13:30

Wimbledon (England)	2–4	(Germany) Hamburger Polo Club
Tipper 9'; Käppeler 51'	Report	Kossel 20'; Russell 37', 43'; Smith 50'

Umpires:
Benjamin Messerli (SUI)
Sarah Wilson (SCO)

9 October 2025
15:45

HC Wien (Austria)	1–13	(Belgium) Léopold
Kokolakis 51'	Report	Boon 1', 7', 18', 18', 49', 54'; Baumgarten 25', 48', 50'; Basterra 30', 53', 60'; Alonso 56'

Umpires:
Katie Howie (SCO)
Ana Ortega (ESP)

9 October 2025
18:00

Club de Campo (Spain)	2–0	(France) CAM 92
Schellinger 25'; Zorita 32'	Report

Umpires:
Harry Collinson (ENG)
Steven Bakker (NED)

11 October 2025
09:45

Western Wildcats (Scotland)	0–7	(Belgium) Braxgata
	Report	Dockier 13'; Walker 17'; Stockbroekx 18'; Luypaert 20', 30', 38'; Reyné 41'

Umpires:
Raphaël Adrien (GER)
Ana Ortega (ESP)

11 October 2025
12:00

Kampong (Netherlands)	4–2	(Spain) Real Club de Polo
Telgenkamp 20', 44'; H. Plantenga 30'; Janssen 59'	Report	Ávila 10'; Miralles 53'

Umpires:
Harry Collinson (ENG)
Sarah Wilson (SCO)

11 October 2025
14:15

Banbridge (Ireland)	0–7	(Netherlands) Bloemendaal
	Report	Mazkour 2', 28', 35'; Miltkau 14', 55'; Schouten 52'; Van 't Land 52'

Umpires:
Kevin Roberts (WAL)
Michael Dutrieux (BEL)

11 October 2025
16:30

Old Georgians (England)	11–0	(Switzerland) Olten
Forsyth 10', 17', 37'; Croft 16', 39', 56'; Roper 28', 28', 59'; Albery 34'; Jackson 52'	Report

Umpires:
Steven Bakker (NED)
Katie Howie (SCO)

=== Ranking matches ===
10 October 2025
11:15

Slavia Prague (Czech Republic)	1–8	(England) Wimbledon
Šmíd 59'	Report	Hooper 4', 14', 35', 54'; Bournac 6'; Vallely 23'; Tipper 48'; Harper 59'

Umpires:
Katie Howie (SCO)
Steven Bakker (NED)

10 October 2025
15:45

CAM 92 (France)	3–2	(Austria) HC Wien
Igau 13', 25', 55'	Report	M. Meisel 39'; Kokolakis 60+'

Umpires:
Kevin Roberts (WAL)
Benjamin Messerli (SUI)

12 October 2025
09:45

Real Club de Polo (Spain)	5–1	(Scotland) Western Wildcats
Miralles 3'; Álvarez 8', 25'; Fortuño 16'; I. Zaldua 42'	Report	McFadden 24'

Umpires:
Kevin Roberts (WAL)
Michael Dutrieux (BEL)

12 October 2025
16:30

Olten (Switzerland)	1–4	(Ireland) Banbridge
Hengartner 52'	Report	Brown 2'; E. Rowe 7'; J. McKee 34'; L. Rowe 47'

Umpires:
Katie Howie (SCO)
Harry Collinson (ENG)

=== Second round ===
10 October 2025
13:30

Saint Germain (France)	2–7	(Germany) Hamburger Polo Club
Dolou 45'; Assoignon 48'	Report	Russell 3', 30'; Bosserhoff 12'; Brand 30', 39', 41'; Smith 34'

Umpires:
Michael Dutrieux (BEL)
Ana Ortega (ESP)

10 October 2025
18:00

Club de Campo (Spain)	1–1	(Belgium) Léopold
Iglesias 31'	Report	Englebert 3'
Penalties
Van Pelt (penalty shoot-out missed); Rodríguez (penalty shoot-out scored); Curiel (penalty shoot-out scored); Medina (penalty shoot-out scored); Poncelet (penalty shoot-out missed); Rodríguez (penalty shoot-out missed); Curiel (penalty shoot-out scored)	4–3	(penalty shoot-out scored) De Backer; (penalty shoot-out scored) Boon; (penalty shoot-out missed) Basterra; (penalty shoot-out missed) Baumgarten; (penalty shoot-out scored) Forgues; (penalty shoot-out missed) Boon; (penalty shoot-out missed) De Backer

Umpires:
Sarah Wilson (SCO)
Raphaël Adrien (GER)

12 October 2025
12:00

Kampong (Netherlands)	5–0	(Belgium) Braxgata
Balk 23'; De Vuijst 39'; Janssen 42'; Van Battum 43'; Telgenkamp 56'	Report

Umpires:
Sarah Wilson (SCO)
Ana Ortega (ESP)

12 October 2025
14:15

Old Georgians (England)	2–2	(Netherlands) Bloemendaal
Forsyth 28', 39'	Report	Wallace 36'; Veen 56'
Penalties
Croft (penalty shoot-out missed); Roper (penalty shoot-out missed); Forsyth (penalty shoot-out scored); Albery (penalty shoot-out scored); Ames (penalty shoot-out scored)	3–1	(penalty shoot-out missed) Croon; (penalty shoot-out missed) Van der Veen; (penalty shoot-out missed) Veen; (penalty shoot-out scored) Langer

Umpires:
Raphaël Adrien (GER)
Benjamin Messerli (SUI)

== Final8 ==
The Final8 was hosted by HC 's-Hertogenbosch and held alongside the women's tournament at Sportpark Oosterplas in 's-Hertogenbosch, Netherlands from 2 to 6 April 2026. The draw was held on 12 October and the schedule was announced on 17 October 2025.

=== Bracket ===
Quarter-finals
2 April
(England) Surbiton	1
(Spain) Club de Campo	3
2 April
(England) Old Georgians	1
(Belgium) Gantoise	3
3 April
(Netherlands) Amsterdam	4
(Germany) Hamburger Polo Club	1
3 April
(Netherlands) Kampong (s.o.)	4 (5)
(Germany) Crefelder HTC	4 (4)

Semi-finals
5 April
(Spain) Club de Campo	2
(Belgium) Gantoise	3
5 April
(Netherlands) Amsterdam	2
(Netherlands) Kampong	3

Final
6 April
(Belgium) Gantoise	2
(Netherlands) Kampong	3
Bronze medal match
6 April
(Spain) Club de Campo	2 (3)
(Netherlands) Amsterdam (s.o.)	2 (4)

=== Quarter-finals ===
2 April 2026
12:45

Old Georgians (England)	1–3	(Belgium) Gantoise
Ward 59'	Report	Duvekot 15'; Hendrickx 20', 29'

Umpires:
Michiel Otten (NED)
Ivona Makar (CRO)

2 April 2026
15:00

Surbiton (England)	1–3	(Spain) Club de Campo
Bandurak 25'	Report	Abajo 22', 28'; Zorita 48'

Umpires:
Raphaël Adrien (GER)
Benjamin Messerli (SUI)

3 April 2026
17:45

Amsterdam (Netherlands)	4–1	(Germany) Hamburger Polo Club
D. Cassiem 18'; Van Bijnen 36', 60'; M. Cassiem 52'	Report	Russell 45'

Umpires:
Dan Barstow (ENG)
Jamie Telfer (SCO)

3 April 2026
20:00

Kampong (Netherlands)	4–4	(Germany) Crefelder HTC
De Wijn 30'; Telgenkamp 33', 50'; Van Bijnen 37'	Report	Wellen 21'; Krueger 28'; Pfandt 57'; Jansen 58'
Penalties
De Geus (penalty shoot-out scored); Sprengers (penalty shoot-out scored); Telgenkamp (penalty shoot-out missed); De Vilder (penalty shoot-out scored); De Wijn (penalty shoot-out missed); De Geus (penalty shoot-out scored); Sprengers (penalty shoot-out scored)	5–4	(penalty shoot-out scored) Sharp; (penalty shoot-out missed) Wellen; (penalty shoot-out scored) Neethling; (penalty shoot-out scored) Howard; (penalty shoot-out missed) Bachmann; (penalty shoot-out scored) Sharp; (penalty shoot-out missed) Wellen

Umpires:
Alison Keogh (IRL)
Pauline Cuypers (BEL)

=== Ranking matches ===
4 April 2026
11:30

Surbiton (England)	1–1	(England) Old Georgians
Furlong 38'	Report	Forsyth 39'
Penalties
Calnan (penalty shoot-out scored); Rushmere (penalty shoot-out missed); Goodfield (penalty shoot-out missed); Williamson (penalty shoot-out missed); Payton (penalty shoot-out missed)	1–2	(penalty shoot-out scored) Croft; (penalty shoot-out scored) Forsyth; (penalty shoot-out missed) Albery; (penalty shoot-out missed) Roper

Umpires:
Raphaël Adrien (GER)
Michaël Pontus (BEL)

5 April 2026
17:00

Hamburger Polo Club (Germany)	5–4	(Germany) Crefelder HTC
Kaufmann 11'; Russell 27', 45'; Smith 43'; Craig 52'	Report	Sharp 14'; Krueger 30'; Pfandt 35'; Breucker 56'

Umpires:
Benjamin Messerli (SUI)
Michaël Pontus (BEL)

=== Semi-finals ===
5 April 2026
12:30

Club de Campo (Spain)	2–3	(Belgium) Gantoise
Medina 26'; Rodríguez 31'	Report	Murray 5'; Hendrickx 51'; Hellin 56'

Umpires:
Alison Keogh (IRL)
Ivona Makar (CRO)

5 April 2026
14:45

Amsterdam (Netherlands)	2–3	(Netherlands) Kampong
Bisschop 14'; D. Cassiem 50'	Report	De Wijn 23'; Janssen 26'; Sprengers 51'

Umpires:
Dan Barstow (ENG)
Raphaël Adrien (GER)

=== Bronze medal match ===
6 April 2026
11:30

Club de Campo (Spain)	2–2	(Netherlands) Amsterdam
Rodríguez 7', 50'	Report	Timmer 13'; Dommershuijzen 46'
Penalties
Vilallonga (penalty shoot-out scored); Rodríguez (penalty shoot-out missed); Curiel (penalty shoot-out missed); De Tejada (penalty shoot-out scored); Medina (penalty shoot-out scored)	3–4	(penalty shoot-out scored) Dommershuijzen; (penalty shoot-out missed) M. Cassiem; (penalty shoot-out scored) Huussen; (penalty shoot-out scored) Bisschop; (penalty shoot-out scored) Morton

Umpires:
Sarah Wilson (SCO)
Jamie Telfer (SCO)

=== Final ===
6 April 2026
16:00

Gantoise (Belgium)	2–3	(Netherlands) Kampong
Hendrickx 53'; Lauwers 56'	Report	Telgenkamp 4'; Van Bijnen 9'; Janssen 34'

Umpires:
Dan Barstow (ENG)
Raphaël Adrien (GER)

== Top goalscorers ==
Rank	Player	Team	FG	PC	PS	Goals
1	(New Zealand) Kane Russell	(Germany) Hamburger Polo Club	0	6	1	7
2	(Netherlands) Duco Telgenkamp	(Netherlands) Kampong	5	1	0	6
2	(Scotland) Alan Forsyth	(England) Old Georgians	3	0	3	6
2	(Belgium) Tom Boon	(Belgium) Léopold	2	2	2	6
5	(Belgium) Alexander Hendrickx	(Belgium) Gantoise	0	4	0	4
5	(Netherlands) Jip Janssen	(Netherlands) Kampong	0	2	2	4
5	(England) Sam Hooper	(England) Wimbledon	0	1	3	4

== See also ==
- 2026 Women's Euro Hockey League
- 2026 Men's EuroHockey Indoor Club Cup
