= 2024 Men's EuroHockey Club Trophy I =

European field hockey tournament

Tournament details
- Host country: Portugal
- City: Lousada
- Dates: 29 March – 1 April
- Teams: 8 (from 8 associations)
- Venue(s): Estádio Municipal de Hóquei em Campo

Final positions
- Champions: (Ireland) Lisnagarvey (2nd title)
- Runner-up: (Wales) Cardiff & Met
- Third place: (Austria) Arminen

Tournament statistics
- Matches played: 16
- Goals scored: 93 (5.81 per match)
- Top scorer(s): Oliver Kidd (Lisnagarvey); Andrew Williamson (Lisnagarvey) (6 goals)
- Best player: Oliver Kidd (Lisnagarvey)
- Best goalkeeper: James Milliken (Lisnagarvey)

The 2024 Men's EuroHockey Club Trophy I was the 47th edition of Europe's secondary men's club field hockey tournament organised by the European Hockey Federation, and the fourth edition since it was renamed from the Men's EuroHockey Club Trophy to the Men's EuroHockey Club Trophy I. The tournament was hosted by A.D. Lousada at the Estádio Municipal de Hóquei em Campo in Lousada, Portugal from 29 March to 1 April 2024.

Cardiff & Met were the two-time defending champions, having won their third title in the previous edition. They were defeated 4–2 in the final by Lisnagarvey, who won their second title. Arminen finished in third after defeating Grange 3–1 in a shoot-out after the match finished 3–3. The hosts Lousada and Olten finished in seventh and eighth place respectively, which means Portugal and Switzerland were relegated to the Trophy II in 2025.

== Preliminary round ==
=== Pool A ===
Pos	Team	Pld	W	D	L	GF	GA	GD	Pts	Qualification or relegation
1	(Wales) Cardiff & Met	3	2	1	0	11	5	+6	12	Final
2	(Austria) Arminen	3	1	2	0	6	5	+1	9	Third place match
3	(Czech Republic) Slavia Prague	3	1	1	1	7	7	0	8	Fifth place match
4	(Switzerland) Olten (R)	3	0	0	3	6	13	−7	2	Relegation to Trophy II

Source: EHF
Rules for classification: 1) points; 2) matches won; 3) goal difference; 4) goals for; 5) head-to-head result; 6) field goals for.
(R) Relegated

29 March 2024
10:30

Olten (Switzerland)	2–3	(Czech Republic) Slavia Prague
	Report

29 March 2024
12:45

Cardiff & Met (Wales)	1–1	(Austria) Arminen
	Report

30 March 2024
10:00

Arminen (Austria)	1–1	(Czech Republic) Slavia Prague
	Report

30 March 2024
12:15

Olten (Switzerland)	1–6	(Wales) Cardiff & Met
	Report

31 March 2024
10:00

Cardiff & Met (Wales)	4–3	(Czech Republic) Slavia Prague
	Report

31 2024
12:15

Arminen (Austria)	4–3	(Switzerland) Olten
	Report

=== Pool B ===
Pos	Team	Pld	W	D	L	GF	GA	GD	Pts	Qualification or relegation
1	(Ireland) Lisnagarvey	3	3	0	0	18	2	+16	15	Final
2	(Scotland) Grange	3	2	0	1	8	7	+1	10	Third place match
3	(Ukraine) OKS Vinnitsa	3	1	0	2	6	13	−7	6	Fifth place match
4	(Portugal) Lousada (H, R)	3	0	0	3	6	16	−10	0	Relegation to Trophy II

Source: EHF
Rules for classification: 1) points; 2) matches won; 3) goal difference; 4) goals for; 5) head-to-head result; 6) field goals for.
(H) Hosts; (R) Relegated

29 March 2024
15:00

Grange (Scotland)	0–4	(Ireland) Lisnagarvey
	Report

29 March 2024
17:15

OKS Vinnitsa (Ukraine)	5–2	(Portugal) Lousada
	Report

30 March 2024
14:30

Grange (Scotland)	3–1	(Ukraine) OKS Vinnitsa
	Report

30 March 2024
16:45

Lousada (Portugal)	2–6	(Ireland) Lisnagarvey
	Report

31 March 2024
14:30

OKS Vinnitsa (Ukraine)	0–8	(Ireland) Lisnagarvey
	Report

31 March 2024
16:45

Lousada (Portugal)	2–5	(Scotland) Grange
	Report

== Classification round ==
=== Seventh and eighth place ===
1 April 2024
09:00

Olten (Switzerland)	2–2	(Portugal) Lousada
	Report
Penalties
	5–6

=== Fifth and sixth place ===
1 April 2024
11:15

Slavia Prague (Czech Republic)	4–5	(Ukraine) OKS Vinnitsa
	Report

=== Third and fourth place ===
1 April 2024
13:30

Arminen (Austria)	3–3	(Scotland) Grange
	Report
Penalties
	3–1

=== Final ===
1 April 2024
15:45

Cardiff & Met (Wales)	2–4	(Ireland) Lisnagarvey
	Report

== Final standings ==
Pos	Team	Relegation
1	(Ireland) Lisnagarvey	
2	(Wales) Cardiff & Met	
3	(Austria) Arminen	
4	(Scotland) Grange	
5	(Ukraine) OKS Vinnitsa	
6	(Czech Republic) Slavia Prague	
7	(Portugal) Lousada (H, R)	EuroHockey Club Trophy II
8	(Switzerland) Olten (R)	EuroHockey Club Trophy II

Source: EHF
(H) Host; (R) Relegated

== See also ==
- 2023–24 Men's Euro Hockey League
- 2024 Women's EuroHockey Club Trophy I
