= Lucy Lanigan =

Scottish field hockey player

Personal information
- Full name: Lucy Jane Lanigan
- Born: 10 February 1994 (age 32) Glasgow, Scotland
- Height: 155 cm (5 ft 1 in)
- Weight: 65 kg (143 lb)

Sport
- Sport: Field hockey
- Position: Forward
- Club: Clydesdale Western
National team
Years	Team	Caps	Goals
2016–	Scotland	37	(4)
Medal record
Women's field hockey
Representing Scotland
EuroHockey Championship II
Gold medal – first place	2019 Glasgow	Team

Lucy Jane Lanigan (born 10 February 1994) is a field hockey player from Scotland who plays as a forward.

== Personal life ==
Lucy Lanigan was born and raised in Glasgow, Scotland.

== Career ==
=== Club hockey ===
She plays club hockey in the Scottish Hockey League Premier Division for Clydesdale Western.

=== National team ===
In 2016, Lanigan made her debut for the Scotland national team. Her first appearance with the team was during a test series against Spain in Alicante.

Since her debut, Lanigan has been a mainstay in the national team. Her most notable appearances have been the 2018 Commonwealth Games in the Gold Coast, as well as the 2019 EuroHockey Championship II in Glasgow where she won a gold medal.

==== International goals ====
Goal	Date	Location	Opponent	Score	Result	Competition	Ref.
1	12 April 2018	Gold Coast Hockey Centre, Gold Coast, Australia	Malaysia	4–2	4–2	2018 Commonwealth Games	
2	2 June 2018	Glasgow National Hockey Centre, Glasgow, Scotland	Ireland	1–5	2–6	Test Match	
3	4 August 2019	Glasgow National Hockey Centre, Glasgow, Scotland	Ukraine	2–0	2–6	2019 EuroHockey Championship II	
4	4 August 2019	Glasgow National Hockey Centre, Glasgow, Scotland	Ukraine	6–0	2–6	2019 EuroHockey Championship II	
