= 2026 Men's EuroHockey Indoor Championship =

Indoor hockey championship in Germany

Tournament details
- Host country: Germany
- City: Heidelberg
- Dates: 8–11 January
- Teams: 10 (from 1 confederation)
- Venue: SNP Dome

Final positions
- Champions: Austria (4th title)
- Runner-up: Poland
- Third place: Spain

Tournament statistics
- Matches played: 29
- Goals scored: 257 (8.86 per match)
- Top scorer: (Belgium) Philippe Simar (12 goals)
- Best player: (Poland) Gracjan Jarzyński
- Best young player: (Germany) Vincent Scholz
- Best goalkeeper: (Poland) Mateusz Popiołkowski

The 2026 Men's EuroHockey Indoor Championship was the 22nd edition of the Men's EuroHockey Indoor Championship, the biennial international men's indoor hockey championship of Europe organized by the European Hockey Federation.

It was held at the SNP Dome in Heidelberg, Germany from 8 to 11 January 2026. It was the sixth time Germany hosted the event.

Austria won their fourth title by defeating Poland 3–2 in a shoot-out after the final finished 3–3. Spain won the bronze medal by defeating the hosts and defending champions Germany 6–5. It was Spains first medal in 20 years and only the second time Germany did not win a medal (last time in 2010). Turkey and Ireland were relegated to the Championship II after one year in the top division.

== Qualification ==
The top eighth teams from the 2024 edition together with the two winners from the Championship II events participated in the 2026 edition.

=== Qualified teams ===
The following ten teams participated in the 2026 EuroHockey Indoor Championship. Ireland and Turkey made their debut in the EuroHockey Indoor Championship.

Dates	Event	Location	Quotas	Qualifiers
1–4 February 2024	2024 EuroHockey Indoor Championship	Leuven, Belgium	8	Austria; Belgium; Czechia; Germany; Poland; Portugal; Spain; Switzerland
2–4 February 2024	2024 EuroHockey Indoor Championship II	Paredes, Portugal	1	Ireland
2–4 February 2024	2024 EuroHockey Indoor Championship II	Budapest, Hungary	1	Turkey
Total			10	

== Preliminary round ==
All times are local (UTC+1).

=== Pool A ===
Pos	Team	Pld	W	D	L	GF	GA	GD	Pts	Qualification or relegation
1	Austria	4	2	2	0	15	12	+3	8	Qualification for the semi-finals
2	Poland	4	2	1	1	17	12	+5	7	Qualification for the semi-finals
3	Czechia	4	2	1	1	15	15	0	7	
4	Portugal	4	1	1	2	14	15	−1	4	
5	Turkey (R)	4	0	1	3	12	19	−7	1	Relegation to the Indoor Championship II

Source: FIH
Rules for classification: 1) points; 2) matches won; 3) goal difference; 4) goals for; 5) head-to-head result; 6) field goals for.
(R) Relegated

8 January 2026
09:30

Poland	5–1	Turkey
Bembenek 11', 12'; Jarzyński 14', 15'; Kurowski 27'	Report	Kalkan 20'

Umpires:
Lisette Baljon (NED)
Tim Meissner (GER)

8 January 2026
10:55

Czechia	4–3	Portugal
Plochý 23', 24'; Homolka 34'; J. Toms 39'	Report	L. Halfmann 4'; Franco 10', 13'

Umpires:
Magali Sergeant (BEL)
Kevin Roberts (WAL)

8 January 2026
16:00

Poland	5–3	Portugal
Kurowski 3'; Gumny 5'; Bembenek 11', 18'; P. Pawlak 28'	Report	Castro 20+', 30'; L. Halfmann 25'

Umpires:
Ana Ortega (ESP)
Sean Edwards (ENG)

8 January 2026
17:25

Austria	4–4	Turkey
Wellan 31', 32', 39'; Losonci 32'	Report	Kalkan 13'; Özkiliç 23'; Elagöz 37'; Aydin 40'

Umpires:
Marcin Grochal (POL)
Kamile Mockaityte (LTU)

9 January 2026
10:00

Portugal	5–3	Turkey
Franco 7'; L. Halfmann 14', 40'; Castro 21'; Gomes 25'	Report	Aydin 5'; Elagöz 22', 31'

Umpires:
Lisette Baljon (NED)
Kevin Roberts (WAL)

9 January 2026
11:20

Czechia	2–4	Austria
Plochý 18'; Klaban 26'	Report	Eitenberger 17'; Kelner 23', 33'; Hasun 29'

Umpires:
Ana Ortega (ESP)
Tim Meissner (GER)

9 January 2026
16:15

Turkey	4–5	Czechia
Özkiliç 3'; Başer 14'; Elagöz 32', 37'	Report	Homolka 2', 11'; J. Toms 8'; Seemann 33'; Plochý 40'

Umpires:
Benjamin Messerli (SUI)
Sean Edwards (ENG)

9 January 2026
17:35

Poland	3–4	Austria
Bembenek 23'; Gumny 35'; Jarzyński 39'	Report	Losonci 4', 24'; Wellan 10'; Eitenberger 36'

Umpires:
Magali Sergeant (BEL)
Tim Meissner (GER)

10 January 2026
09:15

Czechia	4–4	Poland
Seemann 2'; Plochý 6', 27'; V. Soukup 37'	Report	Bembenek 4', 24'; Jarzyński 37'; Kurowski 40'

Umpires:
Ana Ortega (ESP)
Daniël Veerman (NED)

10 January 2026
10:35

Austria	3–3	Portugal
Steyrer 13'; Wellan 15'; Nyckowiak 18'	Report	Castro 8'; L. Halfmann 16'; Franco 24'

Umpires:
Magali Sergeant (BEL)
Sean Edwards (ENG)

=== Pool B ===
Pos	Team	Pld	W	D	L	GF	GA	GD	Pts	Qualification or relegation
1	Germany (H)	4	4	0	0	32	12	+20	12	Qualification for the semi-finals
2	Spain	4	3	0	1	28	13	+15	9	Qualification for the semi-finals
3	Switzerland	4	2	0	2	18	22	−4	6	
4	Belgium	4	1	0	3	17	30	−13	3	
5	Ireland (R)	4	0	0	4	11	29	−18	0	Relegation to the Indoor Championship II

Source: FIH
Rules for classification: 1) points; 2) matches won; 3) goal difference; 4) goals for; 5) head-to-head result; 6) field goals for.
(H) Hosts; (R) Relegated

8 January 2026
12:20

Belgium	5–3	Ireland
Simar 21', 24', 28'; Magnant 26'; Joye 38'	Report	Williams 11', 40'; Canning 13'

Umpires:
Kamile Mockaityte (LTU)
Benjamin Messerli (SUI)

8 January 2026
13:45

Switzerland	1–7	Spain
Grandchamp 23'	Report	Curiel 7', 11', 25'; Abajo 16', 30'; Rodríguez 24'; Cobos 40'

Umpires:
Marcin Grochal (POL)
Daniël Veerman (NED)

8 January 2026
18:50

Belgium	5–6	Spain
Simar 29', 31', 34', 39'; Poncelet 39'	Report	Román 3'; Muñoz 28', 34'; Abajo 35', 40'; Cobos 38'

Umpires:
Lisette Baljon (NED)
Benjamin Messerli (SUI)

8 January 2026
20:15

Germany	7–3	Ireland
Grossmann 10', 11', 34'; Proske 14'; Schmidt-Didlaukies 24'; Pöhling 37'; Brandenstein 40'	Report	Williams 12'; Patterson 16'; Canning 34'

Umpires:
Kevin Roberts (WAL)
Daniël Veerman (NED)

9 January 2026
12:40

Spain	11–2	Ireland
Abajo 3', 27'; Cobos 6'; Amat 9'; J. Muñoz 10', 35'; Curiel 20'; F. Muñoz 24'; Prol 27'; Zorita 30', 40+'	Report	Canning 25'; Kidd 30'

Umpires:
Benjamin Messerli (SUI)
Sean Edwards (ENG)

9 January 2026
14:00

Switzerland	3–7	Germany
M. Morard 16'; Landtwing 29'; Brönnimann 37'	Report	Kerner 2', 7', 25', 26'; Pöhling 9'; Proske 12'; Boeckel 40'

Umpires:
Daniël Veerman (NED)
Magali Sergeant (BEL)

9 January 2026
18:55

Ireland	3–6	Switzerland
Mackay 2'; Kidd 6'; Williams 27'	Report	Brönnimann 14', 25', 40'; Grandchamp 23'; M. Morard 31', 31'

Umpires:
Marcin Grochal (POL)
Ana Ortega (ESP)

9 January 2026
20:15

Belgium	2–13	Germany
Simar 19'; Degroote 35'	Report	Brandenstein 5', 35'; Schmidt-Didlaukies 8'; Grossmann 9'; Kerner 11'; Proske 12', 28', 30', 34'; Pöhling 23', 33'; Linnekogel 27'; Boeckel 38'

Umpires:
Kamile Mockaityte (LTU)
Kevin Roberts (WAL)

10 January 2026
11:55

Switzerland	8–5	Belgium
M. Morard 6'; Grandchamp 13', 30', 35'; Landtwing 37'; Hengartner 37'; Brönnimann 39', 40'	Report	Simar 11'; Van Bogaert 14'; Dykmans 28', 37', 38'

Umpires:
Kamile Mockaityte (LTU)
Tim Meissner (GER)

10 January 2026
13:15

Germany	5–4	Spain
Pöhling 3', 24'; Proske 6'; Kerner 8', 12'	Report	F. Muñoz 10'; Román 12'; Cobos 26'; Prol 39'

Umpires:
Lisette Baljon (NED)
Marcin Grochal (POL)

== Ninth to tenth place classification ==
=== Ninth and tenth place ===
11 January 2026
09:00

Turkey	4–3	Ireland
Aydin 17'; Kilinc 18'; Başer 27'; Elagöz 35'	Report	Canning 7', 40'; Walker 19'

Umpires:
Kamile Mockaityte (LTU)
Kevin Robert (WAL)

== Fifth to eighth place classification ==
=== Bracket ===
Semi-finals
10 January
Czechia	4
Belgium	5
10 January
Switzerland (s.o.)	5 (2)
Portugal	5 (0)

Fifth place
11 January
Belgium	7
Switzerland	6
Seventh place
11 January
Czechia	3
Portugal	6

=== Semi-finals ===
10 January 2026
16:30

Czechia	4–5	Belgium
V. Soukup 18'; Plochý 28', 37'; Seemann 40'	Report	Simar 4', 8'; Stassin 14'; Van Bogaert 16'; Dykmans 29'

Umpires:
Kevin Roberts (WAL)
Benjamin Messerli (SUI)

10 January 2026
17:55

Switzerland	5–5	Portugal
M. Morard 18', 19'; Grandchamp 26', 33'; Conrad 38'	Report	L. Halfmann 15', 23'; Castro 16'; Rodrigues 20'; Gomes 29'
Penalties
Y. Morard (penalty shoot-out scored); Reinhard (penalty shoot-out missed); Grandchamp (penalty shoot-out scored)	2–0	(penalty shoot-out missed) L. Halfmann; (penalty shoot-out missed) Castro

Umpires:
Daniël Veerman (NED)
Magali Sergeant (BEL)

=== Seventh and eighth place ===
11 January 2026
10:25

Czechia	3–6	Portugal
Plochý 9'; J. Toms 29', 31'	Report	Castro 5'; Gomes 28'; Franco 33', 39'; Q. Halfmann 38'; Valinhas 38'

Umpires:
Benjamin Messerli (SUI)
Ana Ortega (ESP)

=== Fifth and sixth place ===
11 January 2026
11:50

Belgium	7–6	Switzerland
Dykmans 3'; Magnant 6', 34'; Simar 22'; Degroote 27'; Poncelet 38'; Thiéry 38'	Report	Grandchamp 10', 35'; Brönnimann 32'; M. Conrad 33'; Landtwing 33'; Y. Morard 39'

Umpires:
Lisette Baljon (NED)
Tim Meissner (GER)

== First to fourth place classification ==
=== Bracket ===
Semi-finals
10 January
Austria (s.o.)	3 (1)
Spain	3 (0)
10 January
Germany	3
Poland	4

Final
11 January
Austria (s.o.)	3 (3)
Poland	3 (2)
Third place
11 January
Spain	6
Germany	5

=== Semi-finals ===
10 January 2026
19:20

Austria	3–3	Spain
Losonci 3', 19', 38'	Report	F. Muñoz 5', 25'; Rodriguez 12'
Penalties
Losonci (penalty shoot-out scored); Wellan (penalty shoot-out missed)	1–0	(penalty shoot-out missed) Abajo; (penalty shoot-out missed) Prol; (penalty shoot-out missed) F. Muñoz

Umpires:
Marcin Grochal (POL)
Tim Meissner (GER)

10 January 2026
20:45

Germany	3–4	Poland
Linnekogel 24'; Brandenstein 29'; Pöhling 37'	Report	Jarzyński 18', 26'; Koperski 25'; Kurowski 31'

Umpires:
Lisette Baljon (NED)
Ana Ortega (ESP)

=== Third and fourth place ===
11 January 2026
13:15

(bronze) Spain	6–5	Germany
Abajo 2', 18', 36'; F. Muñoz 5', 15'; Roman 40'	Report	Kerner 8'; Brandenstein 15', 20', 29'; Scholz 19'

Umpires:
Magali Sergeant (BEL)
Marcin Grochal (POL)

=== Final ===
11 January 2026
14:40

(gold) Austria	3–3	Poland (silver)
Losonci 20', 27'; Eitenberger 26'	Report	Kurowski 13'; Jarzyński 14'; Gumny 24'
Penalties
Losonci (penalty shoot-out scored); Wellan (penalty shoot-out scored); Eitenberger (penalty shoot-out scored)	3–2	(penalty shoot-out scored) Kurowski; (penalty shoot-out scored) P. Pawlak; (penalty shoot-out missed) Jarzyński

Umpires:
Sean Edwards (ENG)
Daniël Veerman (NED)

== Statistics ==
=== Final standings ===
Pos	Team	Relegation
1st place, gold medalist(s)	Austria	
2nd place, silver medalist(s)	Poland	
3rd place, bronze medalist(s)	Spain	
4	Germany (H)	
5	Belgium	
6	Switzerland	
7	Portugal	
8	Czechia	
9	Turkey (R)	Relegation to the Indoor Championship II
10	Ireland (R)	Relegation to the Indoor Championship II

Source: FIH
(H) Host; (R) Relegated

=== Goalscorers ===
There were 257 goals scored in 29 matches, for an average of 8.86 goals per match.

12 goals

- (Belgium) Philippe Simar

9 goals

- (Czech Republic) Lukas Plochý
- (Spain) Ignacio Abajo

8 goals

- (Austria) Fülöp Losonci
- (Germany) Nik Kerner
- (Spain) Ferran Muñoz
- (Switzerland) Loris Grandchamp

7 goals

- (Germany) Sten Brandenstein
- (Germany) Nicolas Proske
- (Germany) Anton Pöhling
- (Poland) Eryk Bembenek
- (Poland) Gracjan Jarzyński
- (Portugal) Laurens Halfmann
- (Switzerland) Elias Brönnimann

6 goals

- (Portugal) Rodrigo Castro
- (Portugal) David Franco
- (Switzerland) Michel Morard
- (Turkey) Müslüm Elagöz

5 goals

- (Austria) Nikolas Wellan
- (Belgium) Gaëtan Dykmans
- (Ireland) Ross Canning
- (Poland) Jacek Kurowski

4 goals

- (Czech Republic) Josef Toms
- (Germany) Luca Grossmann
- (Ireland) Gregory Williams
- (Spain) Ignacio Cobos
- (Spain) Cesar Curiel
- (Switzerland) Fabio Landtwing

3 goals

- (Austria) Sebastian Eitenberger
- (Belgium) Mallory Magnant
- (Czech Republic) Jakub Homolka
- (Czech Republic) Martin Seemann
- (Poland) Mikołaj Gumny
- (Portugal) Emil Gomes
- (Spain) Pablo Roman
- (Turkey) Celal Aydin

2 goals

- (Austria) Maximilian Kelner
- (Belgium) Tom Degroote
- (Belgium) Sam Poncelet
- (Belgium) Brian Van Bogaert
- (Czech Republic) Vít Soukup
- (Germany) Anton Boeckel
- (Germany) Dieter Linnekogel
- (Germany) Tom Schmidt-Didlaukies
- (Ireland) Oliver Kidd
- (Spain) Juan Muñoz
- (Spain) Manuel Prol
- (Spain) Manuel Rodriguez
- (Spain) Enrique Zorita
- (Switzerland) Mika Conrad
- (Turkey) Volkan Başer
- (Turkey) Sait Kalkan
- (Turkey) Ali Akin Özkiliç

1 goal

- (Austria) Xaver Hasun
- (Austria) Marcin Nyckowiak
- (Austria) Florian Steyrer
- (Belgium) Thomas Joye
- (Belgium) Tom Stassin
- (Belgium) Dorian Thiéry
- (Czech Republic) Štěpán Klaban
- (Germany) Vincent Scholz
- (Ireland) Craig Mackay
- (Ireland) Rory Patterson
- (Ireland) James Walker
- (Poland) Maksymilian Koperski
- (Poland) Patryk Pawlak
- (Portugal) Quentin Halfmann
- (Portugal) Miguel Rodrigues
- (Portugal) José Valinhas
- (Spain) Pere Amat
- (Switzerland) Lukas Hengartner
- (Switzerland) Yves Morard
- (Turkey) Vakif Kilinc

Source: FIH

== See also ==
- 2026 Men's EuroHockey Indoor Club Cup
- 2026 Women's EuroHockey Indoor Championship
