= Charlotte Watson =

Scottish field hockey player

Personal information
- Born: 23 April 1998 (age 28) Dundee, Scotland
- Height: 167 cm (5 ft 6 in)
- Weight: 62 kg (137 lb)

Sport
- Sport: Field hockey
- Position: Forward
- Club: Loughborough Students
National team
Years	Team	Caps	Goals
2016–	Scotland	67	(9)
2019–	Great Britain	9	(2)
Medal record
Women's field hockey
Representing Scotland
EuroHockey Championship II
Gold medal – first place	2019 Glasgow	Team

Charlotte Watson (born 23 April 1998) is a Scottish field hockey, who plays as a forward for Scotland and Great Britain.

== Personal life ==
Charlotte Watson was born and raised in Dundee, Scotland.

== Career ==
=== Club hockey ===
She plays club hockey in the Women's England Hockey League Premier Division for Loughborough Students.

She has previously played for Holcombe and in Scotland's Women's Premiership league for Dundee Wanderers.

=== National teams ===
==== Scotland ====
Watson made her senior international debut for Scotland in 2016, during a test match against South Africa in Cape Town.

In 2018, Watson was a member of the Scottish team at the 2018 Commonwealth Games in the Gold Coast.

Her most prominent appearance in Scottish colours to date was in 2019 at the EuroHockey Championship II in Glasgow. At the tournament, Watson scored Scotland's second goal in the final, helping the team to a 2–1 win and their third gold medal at the event.

==== Great Britain ====
In 2019, Watson was given her first call up to the Great Britain women's team. Her first appearance was during a test match against Japan in Hiroshima. Following her debut, Watson went on to represent the team during a test series against India and at the FIH Olympic Qualifiers, in Marlow and London respectively.

=== International Goals ===
Note: The following data includes goals for both Scotland and Great Britain.

Goal	Date	Location	Opponent	Score	Result	Competition	Ref.
1	28 July 2017	Glasgow National Hockey Centre, Glasgow, Scotland	France	2–1	4–1	Test Match	
2	22 October 2017	Belfast Harlequins HC, Belfast, Northern Ireland	Ireland	1–1	1–1	Test Match	
3	2 June 2018	Glasgow National Hockey Centre, Glasgow, Scotland	Ireland	2–5	2–6	Test Match	
4	21 February 2019	Acqua Acetosa, Rome, Italy	Italy	1–1	1–3	Test Match	
5	15 May 2019	Glasgow National Hockey Centre, Glasgow, Scotland	Canada	1–1	1–4	Test Match	
6	19 May 2019	Glasgow National Hockey Centre, Glasgow, Scotland	Canada	1–3	1–7	Test Match	
7	11 June 2019	Banbridge Hockey Club, Banbridge, Northern Ireland	Ukraine	3–0	4–0	2018–19 FIH Series Finals	
8	4 August 2019	Glasgow National Hockey Centre, Glasgow, Scotland	Ukraine	1–0	7–0	2019 EuroHockey Championship II	
9	10 August 2019	Glasgow National Hockey Centre, Glasgow, Scotland	Italy	2–0	2–1	2019 EuroHockey Championship II	
10 ^{GB}	2 October 2019	Marlow Hockey Club, Marlow, England	India	2–1	3–1	Test Match	
