= 2024–25 Men's Belgian Hockey League =

Field hockey league season

Belgian Hockey League
- Season: 2024–25
- Dates: 8 September 2024 – 25 May 2025
- Champions: Gantoise (4th title)
- Relegated: Daring; Namur
- Euro Hockey League: Gantoise; Léopold; Braxgata
- Matches played: 139
- Goals scored: 753 (5.42 per match)
- Top goalscorer: Alexander Hendrickx (52 goals)
- Biggest home win: Léopold 10–0 Namur
- Biggest away win: Namur 0–8 Dragons
- Highest scoring: Waterloo Ducks 10–1 Namur

The 2024–25 Men's Belgian Hockey League was the 105th season of the Men's Belgian Hockey League, the top men's Belgian field hockey league.

The season started on 8 September 2024 and concluded on 25 May 2024 with the second match of the championship final. Gantoise were the two-time defending champions. They defended their title by defeating record-champions Léopold 5–3 in a shoot-out after the final series finished 5–5 on aggregate.

== Teams ==
2024–25 Men's Belgian Hockey League teams
Location of Brussels teams in the 2024–25 Men's Belgian Hockey League

Beerschot and Namur are the two promoted clubs from the 2023–24 National 1, replacing Victory and White Star.

Team	Location	Province
Beerschot	Kontich	Antwerp
Braxgata	Boom	Antwerp
Daring	Molenbeek-Saint-Jean	Brussels
Dragons	Brasschaat	Antwerp
Gantoise	Ghent	East Flanders
Herakles	Lier	Antwerp
Léopold	Uccle	Brussels
Namur	Saint-Servais	Namur
Orée	Woluwe-Saint-Pierre	Brussels
Racing	Uccle	Brussels
Uccle Sport	Uccle	Brussels
Waterloo Ducks	Waterloo	Walloon Brabant

=== Number of teams by provinces ===
Province	Number of teams	Team(s)
Brussels	5	Daring, Léopold, Orée, Racing, Uccle Sport
Antwerp	4	Beerschot, Braxgata, Dragons, Herakles
East Flanders	1	Gantoise
Namur	1	Namur
Walloon Brabant	1	Waterloo Ducks
Total	12	

== Regular season ==
=== Standings ===
Pos	Team	Pld	W	D	L	GF	GA	GD	Pts	Qualification or relegation
1	Gantoise (C)	22	16	4	2	90	39	+51	52	Qualification for the Euro Hockey League quarter-finals and the play-offs
2	Léopold	22	14	4	4	77	35	+42	46	Qualification for the Euro Hockey League first round and the play-offs
3	Braxgata	22	13	6	3	70	39	+31	45	Qualification for the Euro Hockey League first round and the play-offs
4	Waterloo Ducks	22	14	2	6	70	47	+23	44	Qualification for the play-offs
5	Dragons	22	11	5	6	76	42	+34	38	
6	Orée	22	11	5	6	59	44	+15	38	
7	Herakles	22	9	4	9	58	52	+6	31	
8	Uccle Sport	22	9	3	10	60	74	−14	30	
9	Racing	22	7	3	12	55	65	−10	24	
10	Beerschot (O)	22	5	3	14	48	71	−23	18	Qualification for the relegation play-offs
11	Daring (R)	22	2	2	18	36	85	−49	8	Relegation to the National 1
12	Namur (R)	22	0	1	21	21	127	−106	1	Relegation to the National 1

Source: Flashscore
Rules for classification: 1) points; 2) matches won; 3) goal difference; 4) goals for; 5) head-to-head result.
(C) Champions; (O) Play-off winners; (R) Relegated

=== Results ===
Home \ Away	BEE	BRA	DAR	DRA	GAN	HER	LEO	NAM	ORE	RAC	UCC	WAT
Beerschot	—	2–4	3–1	1–2	0–4	1–3	1–7	5–0	4–1	2–5	4–2	3–3
Braxgata	3–2	—	8–0	2–4	2–2	2–2	2–0	6–0	1–3	3–2	9–3	0–2
Daring	1–2	0–2	—	2–7	1–3	2–4	4–6	2–1	0–3	1–3	1–3	2–4
Dragons	6–2	2–2	3–3	—	2–3	5–4	1–3	7–0	0–0	2–2	9–1	5–1
Gantoise	5–0	3–5	5–2	4–1	—	5–2	1–1	9–1	4–2	7–1	5–3	4–1
Herakles	4–3	3–4	3–3	0–3	2–6	—	1–1	3–1	2–0	6–1	4–4	1–2
Léopold	1–0	2–2	7–2	2–1	4–1	3–4	—	10–0	3–4	2–1	2–2	4–0
Namur	3–3	1–5	1–2	0–8	0–7	1–6	2–5	—	3–7	1–5	1–6	2–6
Orée	3–3	0–1	4–1	2–2	3–3	1–0	1–0	3–0	—	4–0	2–4	2–4
Racing	5–2	3–3	3–2	2–4	2–3	2–1	2–3	5–1	5–5	—	2–3	1–2
Uccle Sport	4–2	1–1	5–2	3–1	1–3	1–3	1–8	7–1	2–6	2–1	—	1–4
Waterloo Ducks	4–3	2–3	5–2	3–1	3–3	1–0	2–3	10–1	2–3	6–2	3–1	—

Source: Flashscore
Legend: Blue = home team win; Yellow = draw; Red = away team win.

== Play-offs ==
=== Bracket ===
Semi-finals
Gantoise	2	2	4
Waterloo Ducks	2	1	3
Léopold	3	3	6
Braxgata	1	4	5

Final
Gantoise (s.o.)	2	3	5
Léopold	3	2	5
Third place
24 May
Waterloo Ducks	2
Braxgata	3

=== Semi-finals ===
17 May 2024
15:00

Waterloo Ducks	2–2	Gantoise
Domene 16', 56'		Hendrickx 11'; Hellin 29'

Waterloo

18 May 2024
15:00

Gantoise	2–1	Waterloo Ducks
Hendrickx 15', 46'		Depelsenaire 54'

Ghent

Gantoise won 4–3 on aggregate.

17 May 2024
15:45

Braxgata	1–3	Léopold
Loots 20'		A. Verdussen 45', 54'; Boon 50'

De Schorre, Boom

18 May 2024
16:00

Léopold	3–4	Braxgata
Basterra 7', 23'; Boon 51'		Loots 9'; Walsh 39'; De Winter 65'; Luypaert 67'

Parc Brugmann, Uccle

Léopold won 6–5 on aggregate.

=== EHL Ticket match ===
24 May 2024
18:15

Braxgata	3–2	Waterloo Ducks
De Winter 11'; Van Bavel 19'; Clément 41'		Domene 65', 69'

Wilrijkse Plein Antwerp, Antwerp

=== Final ===
24 May 2024
16:00

Gantoise	2–3	Léopold
Casella 32'; Hendrickx 42'		Basterra 20', 53', 62'

Wilrijkse Plein Antwerp, Antwerp

25 May 2024
14:00

Léopold	2–3	Gantoise
Boon 13'; Basterra 70'		Masson 8'; Hendrickx 38', 50'
Penalties
De Backer (penalty shoot-out scored); Boon (penalty shoot-out scored); Basterra (penalty shoot-out scored); N. Poncelet (penalty shoot-out missed)	3–5	(penalty shoot-out scored) Casella; (penalty shoot-out scored) Tynevez; (penalty shoot-out scored) Murray; (penalty shoot-out scored) Kina; (penalty shoot-out scored) Hellin

Wilrijkse Plein Antwerp, Antwerp

5–5 on aggregate.

== Relegation play-offs ==
The relegation play-offs took place on 24 and 25 May 2025.

=== Overview ===
Team 1	Agg.	Team 2	1st leg	2nd leg
Beerschot	10–3	Antwerp	4–1	6–2

=== Matches ===
24 May 2025
15:00

Antwerp	1–4	Beerschot

Brecht

25 May 2025
15:00

Beerschot	6–2	Antwerp

Kontich

Beerschot won 10–3 on aggregate, and therefore both clubs remained in their respective leagues.

== Top goalscorers ==
Rank	Player	Club	FG	PC	PS	Goals
1	(Belgium) Alexander Hendrickx	Gantoise	0	50	2	52
2	(Argentina) Tomas Domene	Waterloo Ducks	13	25	3	41
3	(Spain) José Basterra	Léopold	12	18	1	31
4	(Belgium) Tom Boon	Léopold	19	9	0	28
5	(Argentina) Nicolás Della Torre	Dragons	0	23	0	23
6	(Spain) Pau Cunill	Herakles	0	16	2	18
7	(Belgium) Loïck Luypaert	Braxgata	0	14	3	17
8	(Belgium) Roman Duvekot	Gantoise	16	0	0	16
8	(Belgium) Jeff De Winter	Braxgata	11	5	0	16
10	(Argentina) Lucas Martínez	Dragons	13	0	0	13
10	(Chile) Juan Amoroso	Uccle Sport	0	10	3	13

== See also ==
- 2024–25 Women's Belgian Hockey League
