= 2024–25 Women's Belgian Hockey League =

Belgian Hockey League
- Season: 2024–25
- Dates: 8 September 2024 – 25 May 2025
- Champions: Braxgata (3rd title)
- Relegated: White Star; Mechelse
- Euro Hockey League: Gantoise; Braxgata
- Matches played: 120
- Goals scored: 430 (3.58 per match)

The 2024–25 Women's Belgian Hockey League is the 99th season of the Women's Belgian Hockey League, the top women's Belgian field hockey league.

The season started on 8 September 2024 and will conclude on 25 May 2025 with the second match of the championship final. Gantoise is the defending champion. The calendar of the season is revealed on 17th July 2024.

== Teams ==
2024–25 Women's Belgian Hockey League teams
Location of Brussels teams in the 2024–25 Women's Belgian Hockey League

White Star and Mechelse are the two promoted clubs from the 2023–24 National 1, replacing Léopold and Pingouin.

| Team | Location | Province |
|---|---|---|
| Antwerp | Brecht | Antwerp |
| Braxgata | Boom | Antwerp |
| Dragons | Brasschaat | Antwerp |
| Gantoise | Ghent | East Flanders |
| Herakles | Lier | Antwerp |
| Leuven | Heverlee | Flemish Brabant |
| Mechelse | Mechelen | Antwerp |
| Racing | Uccle | Brussels |
| Victory | Edegem | Antwerp |
| Waterloo Ducks | Waterloo | Walloon Brabant |
| Wellington | Uccle | Brussels |
| White Star | Evere | Brussels |

=== Number of teams by provinces ===
| Province | Number of teams | Team(s) |
|---|---|---|
| Antwerp | 6 | Antwerp, Braxgata, Dragons, Herakles, Mechelse, Victory |
| Brussels | 3 | Racing, Wellington, White Star |
| East Flanders | 1 | Gantoise |
| Flemish Brabant | 1 | Leuven |
| Walloon Brabant | 1 | Waterloo Ducks |
| Total | 12 | |

== Regular season ==
=== Standings ===
| Pos | Team | Pld | W | D | L | GF | GA | GD | Pts | Qualification or relegation |
|---|---|---|---|---|---|---|---|---|---|---|
| 1 | Gantoise | 22 | 18 | 2 | 2 | 68 | 17 | +51 | 56 | Qualification for the Euro Hockey League and the play-offs |
| 2 | Dragons | 22 | 15 | 5 | 2 | 72 | 27 | +45 | 50 | Qualification for the play-offs |
| 3 | Braxgata (C) | 22 | 13 | 4 | 5 | 59 | 27 | +32 | 43 | Qualification for the Euro Hockey League and the play-offs |
| 4 | Leuven | 22 | 12 | 5 | 5 | 43 | 31 | +12 | 41 | Qualification for the play-offs |
| 5 | Wellington | 22 | 10 | 4 | 8 | 40 | 33 | +7 | 34 | |
| 6 | Waterloo Ducks | 22 | 8 | 9 | 5 | 44 | 36 | +8 | 33 | |
| 7 | Racing | 22 | 7 | 6 | 9 | 30 | 36 | −6 | 27 | |
| 8 | Antwerp | 22 | 6 | 6 | 10 | 39 | 52 | −13 | 24 | |
| 9 | Herakles | 22 | 5 | 8 | 9 | 30 | 35 | −5 | 23 | |
| 10 | Victory (O) | 22 | 5 | 2 | 15 | 19 | 52 | −33 | 17 | Qualification for the relegation play-offs |
| 11 | White Star (R) | 22 | 2 | 3 | 17 | 15 | 75 | −60 | 9 | Relegation to the National 1 |
| 12 | Mechelse (R) | 22 | 1 | 6 | 15 | 27 | 65 | −38 | 9 | Relegation to the National 1 |

Updated to match(es) played on 11 May 2025. Source: Carlsberg 0.0 Hockey League Ranking
Rules for classification: 1) points; 2) matches won; 3) goal difference; 4) goals for; 5) head-to-head result.
(C) Champions; (O) Play-off winners; (R) Relegated

=== Results ===
| Home \ Away | ANT | BRA | DRA | GAN | HER | LEU | MEC | RAC | VIC | WAT | WEL | WHI |
|---|---|---|---|---|---|---|---|---|---|---|---|---|
| Antwerp | | 1–2 | 1–1 | 1–3 | 1–1 | 2–2 | 3–3 | 2–1 | 1–0 | 1–2 | 0–2 | 3–1 |
| Braxgata | 6–0 | | 4–4 | 1–2 | 0–1 | 1–0 | 5–2 | 2–1 | 3–0 | 1–1 | 2–1 | 7–0 |
| Dragons | 4–2 | 2–0 | | 0–0 | 3–1 | 1–2 | 5–1 | 4–0 | 4–1 | 1–0 | 3–1 | 10–0 |
| Gantoise | 4–0 | 4–3 | 3–1 | | 4–1 | 2–1 | 4–0 | 5–0 | 3–0 | 4–1 | 0–0 | 2–1 |
| Herakles | 2–2 | 1–2 | 2–2 | 1–2 | | 0–0 | 3–0 | 1–2 | 0–1 | 2–2 | 2–5 | 3–0 |
| Leuven | 5–2 | 1–4 | 2–2 | 0–6 | 2–1 | | 3–1 | 1–0 | 2–0 | 1–1 | 2–0 | 3–1 |
| Mechelse | 0–1 | 1–1 | 2–3 | 1–3 | 2–2 | 1–3 | | 1–1 | 3–3 | 1–5 | 1–2 | 3–2 |
| Racing | 3–2 | 0–0 | 1–4 | 1–0 | 0–0 | 0–2 | 5–0 | | 2–1 | 2–2 | 2–1 | 4–0 |
| Victory | 0–3 | 0–6 | 0–4 | 1–3 | 1–3 | 0–4 | 3–2 | 3–1 | | 1–1 | 0–3 | 2–0 |
| Waterloo Ducks | 8–4 | 2–1 | 1–2 | 1–6 | 0–0 | 2–2 | 4–0 | 2–2 | 2–0 | | 1–2 | 2–0 |
| Wellington | 2–2 | 2–3 | 3–4 | 2–1 | 3–1 | 3–2 | 3–1 | 2–1 | 0–1 | 2–2 | | 0–0 |
| White Star | 0–5 | 1–5 | 0–8 | 0–7 | 1–2 | 1–3 | 1–1 | 1–1 | 2–1 | 1–2 | 2–1 | |

Updated to match(es) played on 11 May 2025. Source: Carlsberg 0.0 Hockey League Schedule
Legend: Blue = home team win; Yellow = draw; Red = away team win.

== Play-offs ==
=== Bracket ===
Semi-finals
Gantoise | 1 | 5 | 6
Leuven | 0 | 0 | 0
Dragons | 1 | 3 | 4
Braxgata | 1 | 4 | 5

Final
Gantoise | 0 | 0 | 0
Braxgata | 1 | 0 | 1
Third place
24 May
Leuven | 2
Dragons | 3

=== Semi-finals ===
17 May 2024
12:00

| Leuven | 0–1 | Gantoise |
|---|---|---|
| | | Gerniers 5' |

Heverlee

18 May 2024
12:00

| Gantoise | 5–0 | Leuven |
|---|---|---|
| Van der Geld 13', 33'; Van den Abeele 41'; Van Remortel 56'; Ballenghien 70' |

Ghent

Gantoise won 6–0 on aggregate.

17 May 2024
13:00

| Braxgata | 1–1 | Dragons |
|---|---|---|
| Vanden Borre 46' | | Gil 33' |

De Schorre, Boom

18 May 2024
13:00

| Dragons | 3–4 | Braxgata |
|---|---|---|
| Cedrés 13'; Gil 18'; De Groof 20' | | Caarls 3', 42'; Dewaet 55'; Van Dieren 63' |

Brasschaat

Braxgata won 5–4 on aggregate.

=== Third place ===
24 May 2024
11:30

| Dragons | 3–2 | Leuven |
|---|---|---|
| Gil 20'; Magis 34', 39' | | Denef 58'; Mesones 64' |

Wilrijkse Plein Antwerp, Antwerp

=== Final ===
24 May 2024
13:45

| Gantoise | 0–1 | Braxgata |
|---|---|---|
| | | Van Dieren 65' |

Wilrijkse Plein Antwerp, Antwerp

25 May 2024
11:30

| Braxgata | 0–0 | Gantoise |

Wilrijkse Plein Antwerp, Antwerp

Braxgata won 1–0 on aggregate.

== Relegation play-offs ==
The relegation play-offs took place on 24 and 25 May 2025.

=== Overview ===
| Team 1 | Agg. | Team 2 | 1st leg | 2nd leg |
|---|---|---|---|---|
| Victory | 4-2 | Uccle Sport | 3-1 | 1-1 |

=== Matches ===
24 May 2025
15:00

| Victory | 3–1 | Uccle Sport |

Edegem

25 May 2025
15:00

| Uccle Sport | 1–1 | Victory |

Uccle

Victory won 4–2 on aggregate, and therefore both clubs remained in their respective leagues.

== Top Goalscorers ==
| Rank | Player | Club | FG | PC | PS | Goals |
|---|---|---|---|---|---|---|
| 1 | (Uruguay) Teresa Viana | Dragons | 18 | 3 | 0 | 21 |
| 2 | (Belgium) Stéphanie Vanden Borre | Braxgata | 0 | 17 | 1 | 18 |
| 3 | (Belgium) Ambre Ballenghien | Gantoise | 16 | 1 | 0 | 17 |
| 3 | (Netherlands) Valerie Magis | Dragons | 0 | 14 | 3 | 17 |
| 5 | (Belgium) Jill Boon | Racing | 9 | 6 | 0 | 15 |
| 6 | (Spain) Anna Gil | Dragons | 11 | 1 | 0 | 12 |
| 7 | (Belgium) Marie Ronquetti | Wellington | 11 | 0 | 0 | 11 |
| 7 | (Ireland) Sarah Torrans | Waterloo Ducks | 11 | 0 | 0 | 11 |
| 7 | (Belgium) Anne-Sophie Weyns | Herakles | 9 | 2 | 0 | 11 |
| 10 | (Belgium) Lisl Denef | Leuven | 10 | 0 | 0 | 10 |
| 10 | (Belgium) Astrid Bonami | Gantoise | 10 | 0 | 0 | 10 |

== See also ==
- 2024–25 Men's Belgian Hockey League
