= 2026 Men's EuroHockey Indoor Club Cup =

International indoor hockey competition

Tournament details
- Host country: Spain
- City: Sant Cugat del Vallès
- Dates: 13–15 February
- Teams: 8 (from 8 associations)
- Venue: Pabellon Municipal

Final positions
- Champions: (Netherlands) Amsterdam (1st title)
- Runner-up: (Germany) Harvestehuder THC
- Third place: (Spain) Junior FC

Tournament statistics
- Matches played: 20
- Goals scored: 211 (10.55 per match)
- Top scorer: Boris Burkhardt (Amsterdam) (13 goals)
- Best player: Dayaan Cassiem (Amsterdam)
- Best goalkeeper: Pablo Luna (Junior FC)

The 2026 Men's EuroHockey Indoor Club Cup was the 35th edition of the Men's EuroHockey Indoor Club Cup, Europe's premier indoor hockey club tournament for men organized by the European Hockey Federation. It was held at the Pabellon Municipal in Sant Cugat del Vallès, Spain from 13 to 15 February 2026.

Amsterdam won their first title and became the first Dutch club to win the tournament by defeating Harvestehuder THC 7–4 in the final. The hosts Junior FC won the bronze medal by defeating the defending champions Léopold 5–4. Plzeň-Litice and Olten finished in seventh and eighth place respectively, which means Czechia and Switzerland were relegated to the Club Trophy in 2026.

== Teams ==
The participating clubs have qualified for each division based on their country's final ranking from the 2025 competition. Ukraine and Turkey were relegated and were replaced by the Czech Republic and England who were promoted from the 2025 EuroHockey Indoor Club Trophy.

- (Netherlands) Amsterdam
- (Germany) Harvestehuder THC
- (Spain) Junior FC
- (Belgium) Léopold
- (England) Old Georgians
- (Switzerland) Olten
- (Czech Republic) Plzeň-Litice
- (Croatia) Zelina

== Preliminary round ==
=== Pool A ===
Pos	Team	Pld	W	D	L	GF	GA	GD	Pts	Qualification
1	(Belgium) Léopold	3	3	0	0	19	11	+8	15	Semi-finals
2	(Netherlands) Amsterdam	3	2	0	1	28	6	+22	11	Semi-finals
3	(Czech Republic) Plzeň-Litice	3	1	0	2	11	22	−11	5	
4	(Switzerland) Olten	3	0	0	3	8	27	−19	2	

Source: EHF
Rules for classification: 1) points; 2) matches won; 3) goal difference; 4) goals for; 5) head-to-head result; 6) field goals for.

13 February 2026
10:00

Amsterdam (Netherlands)	9–0	(Czech Republic) Plzeň-Litice
M. Cassiem 8', 28'; Steins Bisschop 17', 23'; Sweering 19'; Burkhardt 36', 36', 38'; D. Cassiem 37'	Report

Umpires:
Isaac Charles (ENG)
Ole Ingwersen (GER)

13 February 2026
11:20

Léopold (Belgium)	5–3	(Switzerland) Olten
Simar 4', 31'; Degroote 5'; N. Leeuw 10'; Englebert 23'	Report	C. Rauch 19', 21'; Hengartner 36'

Umpires:
Lukasz Zwierzchowski (POL)
Jake Charles (ENG)

13 February 2026
16:00

Olten (Switzerland)	5–7	(Czech Republic) Plzeň-Litice
Ribaudo 29', 40'; S. Rauch 30+'; Muggli 32', 40'	Report	Hes 7'; Gerlický 17', 23', 25'; Homolka 29'; Augustinič 34'; Benda 38'

Umpires:
Daniël Veerman (NED)
Jake Charles (ENG)

13 February 2026
17:20

Amsterdam (Netherlands)	4–6	(Belgium) Léopold
Burkhardt 7'; Sweering 16'; M. Cassiem 21'; Steins Bisschop 30'	Report	Degroote 8'; Zimmer 11'; Simar 22', 30', 39'; N. Leeuw 37'

Umpires:
Ana Ortega (ESP)
Daniel Denta (DEN)

14 February 2026
09:00

Olten (Switzerland)	0–15	(Netherlands) Amsterdam
	Report	Steins Bisschop 2', 14', 27', 28'; Harm 20', 34'; Burkhardt 22', 35', 35', 40'; Boermans 28'; M. Cassiem 34', 36'; D. Cassiem 35'; Sweering 39'

Umpires:
Daniel Denta (DEN)
Michaël Pontus (BEL)

14 February 2026
10:20

Léopold (Belgium)	8–4	(Czech Republic) Plzeň-Litice
Simar 2', 11', 20'; Degroote 14'; I. Lockwood 18'; Poncelet 21'; Englebert 32'; Callewaert 40'	Report	Benda 4', 9'; Augustinič 22', 26'

Umpires:
Lukasz Orzeł (POL)
Isaaz Charles (ENG)

=== Pool B ===
Pos	Team	Pld	W	D	L	GF	GA	GD	Pts	Qualification
1	(Spain) Junior FC (H)	3	3	0	0	18	6	+12	15	Semi-finals
2	(Germany) Harvestehuder THC	3	2	0	1	23	11	+12	10	Semi-finals
3	(Croatia) Zelina	3	1	0	2	13	24	−11	5	
4	(England) Old Georgians	3	0	0	3	9	22	−13	0	

Source: EHF
Rules for classification: 1) points; 2) matches won; 3) goal difference; 4) goals for; 5) head-to-head result; 6) field goals for.
(H) Hosts

13 February 2026
12:40

Junior FC (Spain)	7–1	(England) Old Georgians
A. Bozal 9'; Serrahima 12', 24'; O. Bozal 17', 38'; Salvador 33'; Muñoz 37'	Report	Proctor 30+'

Umpires:
Daniël Veerman (NED)
Daniel Denta (DEN)

13 February 2026
14:00

Harvestehuder THC (Germany)	13–3	(Croatia) Zelina
Jarzyński 3', 8', 31', 37'; Losonci 15', 15', 20'; Scholz 22'; Reuter 23', 29'; Von Gersum 25'; Pöhling 27', 28'	Report	Šoić 2', 16'; Hrupec 24'

Umpires:
Lukasz Orzeł (POL)
Michaël Pontus (BEL)

13 February 2026
18:40

Zelina (Croatia)	10–7	(England) Old Georgians
Kovalenko 1', 20', 23', 40'; Šoić 9', 16'; Hrupec 14'; Ilinović 22'; Posavec 32', 35'	Report	Griffiths 3', 17'; J. Carson 5'; Forsyth 9'; Shingles 37'; T. Carson 38', 40'

Umpires:
Ole Ingwersen (GER)
Lukasz Orzeł (POL)

13 February 2026
20:00

Junior FC (Spain)	7–5	(Germany) Harvestehuder THC
Salvador 2'; Espino 3'; Muñoz 24'; Mustarós 32', 40'; A. Serrahima 35'; O. Serrahima 38'	Report	Jarzyński FG', FG'; Losonci 4', 10'; A. Pöhling 8'

Umpires:
Michaël Pontus (BEL)
Lukasz Zwierzchowski (POL)

14 February 2026
11:40

Harvestehuder THC (Germany)	5–1	(England) Old Georgians
Von Gersum 15'	Report	Forsyth 4'; Reuter 24'; Pöhling 27'; Losonci 33'; Scholz 38'

Umpires:
Ana Ortega (ESP)
Daniël Veerman (NED)

14 February 2026
13:00

Zelina (Croatia)	0–4	(Spain) Junior FC
	Report	O. Serrahima 15'; Muñoz 23'; Mustarós 30', 39'

Umpires:
Lukasz Zwierzchowski (POL)
Ole Ingwersen (GER)

== Fifth to eighth place classification ==
The points obtained in the preliminary round against the other team were carried over.

=== Pool C ===
Pos	Team	Pld	W	D	L	GF	GA	GD	Pts	Relegation
5	(Croatia) Zelina	3	3	0	0	23	16	+7	15	
6	(England) Old Georgians	3	2	0	1	20	15	+5	10	
7	(Czech Republic) Plzeň-Litice (R)	3	1	0	2	15	18	−3	5	EuroHockey Indoor Club Trophy
8	(Switzerland) Olten (R)	3	0	0	3	11	20	−9	0	EuroHockey Indoor Club Trophy

Source: EHF
Rules for classification: 1) points; 2) matches won; 3) goal difference; 4) goals for; 5) head-to-head result; 6) field goals for.
(R) Relegated

14 February 2026
16:30

Olten (Switzerland)	2–7	(England) Old Georgians
Hengartner 28'; Gassner 40'	Report	Griffiths 3', 8', 9', 40'; Forsyth 14', 23'; Rauch 36'

Umpires:
Lukasz Orzeł (POL)
Michaël Pontus (BEL)

14 February 2026
17:50

Plzeň-Litice (Czech Republic)	5–7	(Croatia) Zelina
Benda 1'; Levý 6'; Homolka 23'; Gerlický 28'; Augustunič 40'	Report	Posavec 22', 33'; Ilinović 24', 40'; Lykov 25'; Šoić 29'; Kovalenko 35'

Umpires:
Jake Charles (ENG)
Isaac Charles (ENG)

15 February 2026
09:30

Plzeň-Litice (Czech Republic)	3–6	(England) Old Georgians
Homolka 31', 39'; Uhlíř 32'	Report	Forsyth 8', 22', 26', 33', 34'; Usoz 37'

Umpires:
Ole Ingwersen (GER)
Lukasz Orzeł (POL)

15 February 2026
11:00

Zelina (Croatia)	6–4	(Switzerland) Olten
Posavec 6'; Šoić 11'; Kovalenko 25'; Ilinović 33', 38'; Hrupec 33'	Report	Rauch 31', 39'; Hengartner 35', 36'

Umpires:
Jake Charles (ENG)
Daniel Denta (DEN)

== First to fourth place classification ==
=== Bracket ===
Semi-finals
14 February
(Belgium) Léopold	4
(Germany) Harvestehuder THC	8
14 February
(Spain) Junior FC	5 (0)
(Netherlands) Amsterdam (s.o.)	5 (2)

Final
15 February
(Germany) Harvestehuder THC	4
(Netherlands) Amsterdam	7
Third place
15 February
(Belgium) Léopold	4
(Spain) Junior FC	5

=== Semi-finals ===
14 February 2026
19:15

Léopold (Belgium)	4–8	(Germany) Harvestehuder THC
Simar 11', 34'; Poncelet 15'; Englebert 27'	Report	Scholz 14', 14'; Losonci 17', 18' von Gersum 22'; Jarzyński 30' von Schwerin 35'; Reuter 40'

Umpires:
Ana Ortega (ESP)
Daniël Veerman (NED)

14 February 2026
20:45

Junior FC (Spain)	5–5	(Netherlands) Amsterdam
O. Bozal 9'; A. Bozal 17', 19', 36'; Espino 31'	Report	M. Cassiem 1'; Steins Bisschop 3'; Burkhardt 27', 29', 40'
Penalties
A. Bozal (penalty shoot-out missed); Serrahima (penalty shoot-out missed)	0–2	(penalty shoot-out missed) D. Cassiem; (penalty shoot-out scored) Steins Bisschop; (penalty shoot-out scored) M. Cassiem

Umpires:
Ole Ingwersen (GER)
Lukasz Zwierzchowski (POL)

=== Third and fourth place ===
15 February 2026
12:30

Léopold (Belgium)	4–5	(Spain) Junior FC
Englebert 10'; Leeuw 17'; Simar 29'; I. Lockwood 36'	Report	A. Bozal 10'; Espino 11'; Serrahima 28', 40'; Perellon 29'

Umpires:
Isaac Charles (ENG)
Daniël Veerman (NED)

=== Final ===
15 February 2026
14:00

Harvestehuder THC (Germany)	4–7	(Netherlands) Amsterdam
Jarzyński 13'; Reuter 19'; Hasun 30+'; Losonci 40'	Report	Burkhardt 2', 37'; M. Cassiem 7', 18'; D. Cassiem 16', 22'; Timmer 39'

Umpires:
Michaël Pontus (BEL)
Ana Ortega (ESP)

== Statistics ==
=== Final standings ===
Pos	Team	Relegation
1st place, gold medalist(s)	(Netherlands) Amsterdam	
2nd place, silver medalist(s)	(Germany) Harvestehuder THC	
3rd place, bronze medalist(s)	(Spain) Junior FC (H)	
4	(Belgium) Léopold	
5	(Croatia) Zelina	
6	(England) Old Georgians	
7	(Czech Republic) Plzeň-Litice (R)	EuroHockey Indoor Club Trophy
8	(Switzerland) Olten (R)	EuroHockey Indoor Club Trophy

Source: EHF
(H) Host; (R) Relegated

=== Top goalscorers ===
Rank	Player	Team	FG	PC	PS	Goals
1	(Netherlands) Boris Burkhardt	(Netherlands) Amsterdam	11	2	0	13
2	(Belgium) Philippe Simar	(Belgium) Léopold	5	6	0	11
3	(Scotland) Alan Forsyth	(England) Old Georgians	5	2	2	9
3	(Austria) Fülöp Losonci	(Germany) Harvestehuder THC	5	2	2	9
5	(South Africa) Mustaphaa Cassiem	(Netherlands) Amsterdam	8	0	0	8
5	(Poland) Gracjan Jarzyński	(Germany) Harvestehuder THC	7	1	0	8
5	(Netherlands) Sam Steins Bisschop	(Netherlands) Amsterdam	3	4	1	8
8	(England) Chris Griffiths	(England) Old Georgians	6	0	0	6
8	(Ukraine) Bohdan Kovalenko	(Croatia) Zelina	5	1	0	6
8	(Spain) Oriol Serrahima	(Spain) Junior FC	5	1	0	6
8	(Croatia) Ivan Šoić	(Croatia) Zelina	4	2	0	6

== See also ==
- 2025–26 Men's Euro Hockey League
- 2026 Women's EuroHockey Indoor Club Cup
