= 2024 Men's EuroHockey Indoor Championship II =

Tournament details
- Host countries: Portugal; Hungary
- Dates: 2–4 February
- Teams: 12 (from 1 confederation)
- Venue(s): 2 (in 2 host cities)

Tournament statistics
- Matches played: 33
- Goals scored: 340 (10.3 per match)
- Top scorer(s): (Italy) Alessandro Muzzioli (18 goals)

The 2024 Men's EuroHockey Indoor Championship II was the fourteenth edition of the Men's EuroHockey Indoor Championship II, the second level of the men's European indoor hockey championships organized by the European Hockey Federation.

This was the first edition with a Championship II-A and II-B having equal status, replacing the former Championship II and Championship III. The winner of each event was promoted to the 2026 Championship. The tournaments were held from 2 to 4 February 2024 in Paredes, Portugal and Budapest, Hungary.

== Qualification ==
Participating teams qualified based on their performance in the 2022 Championships. Portugal was originally scheduled to participate in the Championship II, but they were offered a spot in the top tier due to the withdrawal of the Netherlands.

=== Qualified teams ===
Dates	Event	Location	Quotas	Qualifiers
14–16 January 2022	2022 EuroHockey Indoor Championship II	Paredes, Portugal	2	Slovakia; Turkey
2–4 December 2022	2022 EuroHockey Indoor Championship III	Athienou, Cyprus	6	Cyprus; Denmark; Greece; Ireland; Italy; Serbia
—	New entry	—	4	Bulgaria; Hungary; Lithuania; Norway
Total			12	

== Championship II-A ==
Tournament details
- Host country: Portugal
- City: Paredes
- Dates: 2–4 February
- Teams: 5 (from 1 confederation)
- Venue(s): Pavilhão Multiusos de Paredes

Final positions
- Champions: Ireland
- Runner-up: Denmark
- Third place: Lithuania

Tournament statistics
- Matches played: 12
- Goals scored: 99 (8.25 per match)
- Top scorer(s): (Ireland) Ross Canning (13 goals)
- Best player: (Denmark) Jesper Jonasson
- Best goalkeeper: (Ireland) Stephen O'Keeffe

Championship II-A was held at Pavilhão Multiusos de Paredes in Paredes, Portugal from 2 to 4 February 2024. Ireland won their first EuroHockey Indoor Championship II title and were promoted to the 2026 Men's EuroHockey Indoor Championship by defeating Denmark 3–1 in the final.

=== Preliminary round ===
All times are local (UTC+0).

Pos	Team	Pld	W	D	L	GF	GA	GD	Pts	Promotion
1	Ireland	4	3	0	1	31	11	+20	9	Final
2	Denmark	4	3	0	1	31	13	+18	9	Final
3	Lithuania	4	2	0	2	14	15	−1	6	Third place match
4	Cyprus	4	1	0	3	5	21	−16	3	Third place match
5	Norway	4	1	0	3	8	29	−21	3	

Source: FIH
Rules for classification: 1) points; 2) matches won; 3) goal difference; 4) goals for; 5) head-to-head result; 6) field goals for.

2 February 2024
12:15

Ireland	11–1	Norway
Mackay 10', 36'; Canning 12', 22', 24', 39'; Patterson 25'; Williams 26', 34'; Hosking 33', 35'	Report	Ashraf 17'

Umpires:
Karolis Donculas (LTU)
Marco Santos (POR)

2 February 2024
13:30

Cyprus	1–3	Lithuania
Lyne 38'	Report	Balsiukas 14'; Pocevicius 20'; Ridlauskas 32'

Umpires:
Divyabhanu Singh Rathore (NOR)
Tommy Croese (BEL)

2 February 2024
16:30

Denmark	13–2	Norway
Thorsted 10', 17', 20', 37', 40'; Grand 13', 15', 21', 35'; Nørgaard 18', 30'; Jonasson 23', 23'	Report	Ashraf 20+'; Janjua 38'

Umpires:
Simon O'Connor (IRL)
Tommy Croese (BEL)

2 February 2024
17:45

Ireland	6–3	Lithuania
Patterson 10+'; Canning 11', 32', 40'; Walker 19'; Williams 36'	Report	Pocevicius 4'; Sinkevičius 8', 30'

Umpires:
Raphaël Adrien (GER)
Divyabhanu Singh Rathore (NOR)

3 February 2024
11:45

Lithuania	3–4	Norway
Balsiukas 7', 27'; Astrauskas 10'	Report	Janjua 4', 23'; Singh 19', 38'

Umpires:
Marco Santos (POR)
Raphaël Adrien (GER)

3 February 2024
13:15

Cyprus	1–8	Denmark
Ilgin 20'	Report	Jonasson 1', 4', 34'; Fich 8', 38'; Møller 15'; Nørgaard 17', 39'

Umpires:
Divyabhanu Singh Rathore (NOR)
Karolis Donculas (LTU)

3 February 2024
17:00

Norway	1–2	Cyprus
Singh 12'	Report	Lyne 12'; Savvides 39'

Umpires:
Karolis Donculas (LTU)
Simon O'Connor (IRL)

3 February 2024
18:15

Ireland	5–6	Denmark
Canning 2'; Williams 17'; Hosking 23'; Walker 28'; Mackay 34'	Report	Jonasson 3', 3', 36'; Grand 11', 40'; Fich 29'

Umpires:
Marco Santos (POR)
Tommy Croese (BEL)

4 February 2024
08:00

Denmark	4–5	Lithuania
Thorsted 21'; Fich 33'; Nørgaard 39'; Pedersen 40+'	Report	Ridlauskas 12', 28', 30'; Sinkevičius 17'; Ridlauskas 36'

Umpires:
Simon O'Connor (IRL)
Raphaël Adrien (GER)

4 February 2024
09:15

Cyprus	1–9	Ireland
Savvides 9'	Report	Patterson 7', 35', 37'; Williams 8'; Canning 23', 28', 34'; Byrne 24'; Hosking 31'

Umpires:
Karolis Donculas (LTU)
Divyabhanu Singh Rathore (NOR)

=== First to fourth place classification ===
==== Third and fourth place ====
4 February 2024
12:15

Lithuania	5–1	Cyprus
Balsiukas 3', 18'; Pocevicius 10', 35'; Stankevič 36'	Report	Lyne 1'

Umpires:
Marco Santos (POR)
Simon O'Connor (IRL)

==== Final ====
4 February 2024
13:40

Ireland	3–1	Denmark
Williams 5'; Canning 37', 39'	Report	Grand 35'

Umpires:
Raphaël Adrien (GER)
Tommy Croese (BEL)

=== Final standings ===
Pos	Team	Promotion
1	Ireland (P)	EuroHockey Indoor Championship
2	Denmark	
3	Lithuania	
4	Cyprus	
5	Norway	

Source: FIH
(P) Promoted

== Championship II-B ==
Tournament details
- Host country: Hungary
- City: Budapest
- Dates: 2–4 February
- Teams: 7 (from 1 confederation)
- Venue(s): Soroksári Sportcsarnok

Final positions
- Champions: Turkey
- Runner-up: Italy
- Third place: Slovakia

Tournament statistics
- Matches played: 21
- Goals scored: 241 (11.48 per match)
- Top scorer(s): (Italy) Alessandro Muzzioli (18 goals)

Championship II-B was held at the Soroksári Sportcsarnok in Budapest, Hungary from 2 to 4 February 2024. Turkey won their first EuroHockey Indoor Championship II title and were promoted to the 2026 Men's EuroHockey Indoor Championship by finishing first in the round-robin tournament.

=== Standings ===
Pos	Team	Pld	W	D	L	GF	GA	GD	Pts	Promotion
1	Turkey (P)	6	6	0	0	59	12	+47	18	EuroHockey Indoor Championship
2	Italy	6	5	0	1	63	10	+53	15	
3	Slovakia	6	4	0	2	54	17	+37	12	
4	Hungary (H)	6	3	0	3	27	21	+6	9	
5	Bulgaria	6	1	0	5	13	57	−44	3	
6	Serbia	6	1	0	5	12	59	−47	3	
7	Greece	6	1	0	5	13	65	−52	3	

Source: FIH
Rules for classification: 1) points; 2) matches won; 3) goal difference; 4) goals for; 5) head-to-head result; 6) field goals scored.
(H) Hosts; (P) Promoted

=== Results ===
All times are local (UTC+0).

2 February 2024
10:00

Bulgaria	2–13	Turkey
Baklev 19'; Momchilov 40'	Report	Öztürk 6'; Aydin 10', 30', 34', 35'; Elagöz 17'; Ekinci 20'; Özdemir 26', 31', 32', 37'; Ataş 27'; Acikgoz 33'

Umpires:
Isaac Charles (ENG)
Balazs Szalay (HUN)

2 February 2024
11:15

Greece	1–14	Italy
Antonakos 13'	Report	Pagliara 6', 14', 23'; Valentino 10'; Muzzioli 20', 27', 30', 37', 37', 39'; Moretto 35'; Chiesa 36'; Succi 36', 38'

Umpires:
Daniël Veerman (NED)
Ivan Yanchev (BUL)

2 February 2024
12:30

Slovakia	15–1	Serbia
Jelačić 4', 9', 13', 25', 38'; Augustinič 5', 6', 18', 34'; Petráš 12', 20', 20+', 26'; Garaj 15'; Hruska 35'	Report	Katančić 11'

Umpires:
Ivan Grgurev (CRO)
Mahmut Çilkiz (TUR)

2 February 2024
14:00

Hungary	1–5	Turkey
Leber 25'	Report	Taşar 8'; Sansar 30'; Ekinci 34'; Aydin 36'; Acikgoz 40'

Umpires:
Michal Pivko (SVK)
Kamaal Khan (ITA)

2 February 2024
16:00

Bulgaria	2–13	Italy
Todorov 20'; Aleksandrov 25'	Report	Pagliara 3', 35'; Succi 9', 17', 30'; Valentino 10+', 28', 40'; Amorosini 16'; Ughetto 21'; Muzzioli 28', 37'; Moretto 37'

Umpires:
Ivan Grgurev (CRO)
Michal Pivko (SVK)

2 February 2024
17:15

Greece	4–3	Serbia
A. Dierckx 8'; Sideridis 20'; N. Dierckx 27', 40'	Report	Losonci 13', 18', 21'

Umpires:
Balazs Szalay (HUN)
Tomas Holek (CZE)

2 February 2024
18:30

Hungary	2–6	Slovakia
Farkas 32'; Hortobágyi 38'	Report	Petrás 9'; Jelačić 17', 23', 40'; Bogar 20'; Krampl 30'

Umpires:
Ivan Yanchev (BUL)
Isaac Charles (ENG)

3 February 2024
10:00

Turkey	14–0	Serbia
Öztürk 2', 27'; Elagöz 8', 20', 30'; Ekinci 17', 23', 34'; Aydin 18', 26', 37'; Ataş 28', 39'; Sansar 36'	Report

Umpires:
Ivan Yanchev (BUL)
Tomas Holek (CZE)

3 February 2024
11:15

Bulgaria	0–13	Slovakia
	Report	Petráš 1', 7', 37'; Bogar 3'; Krampl 5'; Jelačić 9', 24'; Romanec 12', 20'; Augustinič 16', 32', 34', 40'

Umpires:
Balazs Szalay (HUN)
Kamaal Khan (ITA)

3 February 2024
12:30

Hungary	1–10	Italy
Papp 33'	Report	Moretto 3'; Muzzioli 4', 22', 40'; Succi 4', 16'; Pagliara 6', 14', 38'; Chiesa 18'

Umpires:
Mahmut Çilkiz (TUR)
Daniël Veerman (NED)

3 February 2024
14:00

Turkey	15–2	Greece
Erdoğan 2'; Öztürk 4', 21'; Aydin 8', 26', 31', 38'; Ataş 9'; Elagöz 11', 19', 25'; Acikgoz 14', 39'; Özdemir 27'; Ekinci 36'	Report	A. Dierckx 33'; Goultidis 35'

Umpires:
Michal Pivko (SVK)
Isaac Charles (ENG)

3 February 2024
16:00

Serbia	7–2	Bulgaria
Dorgan 3'; Losonci 15'; Marjanušić 16'; R. Kiš 19', 23', 24', 36'	Report	Stoyanov 6'; Baklev 18'

Umpires:
Daniël Veerman (NED)
Kamaal Khan (ITA)

3 February 2024
17:15

Italy	5–1	Slovakia
Pagliara 6', 14'; Succi 15'; Muzzioli 23'; Amorosini 26'	Report	Hruska 14'

Umpires:
Ivan Grgyrev (CRO)
Tomas Holek (CZE)

3 February 2024
18:30

Greece	0–11	Hungary
	Report	Farkas 2'; Kovacs 11'; Leber 20', 26'; Wesselenyi 21'; Hortobágyi 22'; Ujvari 26'; Papp 28'; Szóga 34', 38'; Csőgör 35'

Umpires:
Michal Pivko (SVK)
Mahmut Çilkiz (TUR)

4 February 2024
08:30

Turkey	4–3	Italy
Özdemir 2'; Elagöz 5', 9'; Ataş 34'	Report	Muzzioli 13', 22'; Moretto 38'

Umpires:
Isaac Charles (ENG)
Daniël Veerman (NED)

4 February 2024
09:45

Greece	1–15	Slovakia
Koulouvardis 26'	Report	Jelačić 1', 8', 18', 23'; Garaj 5'; Bogar 11', 24'; Krampl 17', 33'; Augustinič 25', 34', 35', 37', 40'; Petrás 29'

Umpires:
Kamaal Khan (ITA)
Ivan Yanchev (BUL)

4 February 2024
11:00

Hungary	6–0	Bulgaria
Wesselenyi 17', 37'; Kovacs 18', 39'; Leber 28'; Szóga 35'	Report

Umpires:
Tomas Holek (CZE)
Mahmut Çilkiz (TUR)

4 February 2024
12:15

Italy	18–1	Serbia
Saoncella 5'; Succi 6', 25', 36', 40'; Pagliara 7', 9', 17', 20', 27'; Chiesa 12', 21'; Valentino 19'; Muzzioli 29', 35', 37', 39'; Amorosini 30'	Report	Kakaš 26'

Umpires:
Ivan Grgurev (CRO)
Balasz Szalay (HUN)

4 February 2024
13:30

Turkey	8–4	Slovakia
Erdoğan 4'; Aydin 6', 21'; Elagöz 23', 37', 38'; Acikgoz 25'; Sansar 28'	Report	Romanec 1', 37'; Petrás 9'; Augustinič 14'

Umpires:
Daniël Veerman (NED)
Tomas Holek (CZE)

4 February 2024
14:45

Greece	5–7	Bulgaria
A. Dierckx 3', 8'; N. Dierckx 5', 16', 26'	Report	Baklev 22', 23', 28', 35'; Aleksandrov 30'; Momchilov 34'

Umpires:
Isaac Charles (ENG)
Mahmut Çilkiz (TUR)

4 February 2024
16:00

Serbia	0–6	Hungary
	Report	Leber 17'; Wesselenyi 18'; Hortobágyi 27'; Papp 28'; Kovacs 30'; Csőgör 38'

Umpires:
Ivan Yanchev (BUL)
Michal Pivko (SVK)

== See also ==
- 2024 Men's EuroHockey Indoor Championship
- 2024 Women's EuroHockey Indoor Championship II
