= Sarah Jamieson (field hockey) =

Scottish field hockey player

Personal information
- Full name: Sarah Jean Jamieson
- Born: 5 May 1994 (age 32) Edinburgh, Scotland
- Height: 165 cm (5 ft 5 in)

Sport
- Sport: Field hockey
- Position: Forward
- Club: Watsonians
National team
Years	Team	Caps	Goals
2016–	Scotland	70	(11)
Medal record
Women's field hockey
Representing Scotland
EuroHockey Championship II
Gold medal – first place	2019 Glasgow	Team

Sarah Jean Jamieson (born 5 May 1994) is a Scottish field hockey player, who plays as a forward.

== Personal life ==
Sarah Jamieson was born and raised in Edinburgh, Scotland. She works as a solicitor.

== Career ==
=== Senior team ===
Sarah Jamieson made her senior international debut for Scotland in 2016, during a test series against Spain in Alicante.

She has represented her native country at two Commonwealth Games. Her first was the XXI Games on the Gold Coast, followed by the XXII Games in Birmingham.
