= Glasgow National Hockey Centre =

Sports venue in Glasgow, Scotland

Coordinates: 55°50′42.47″N 4°14′12.23″W

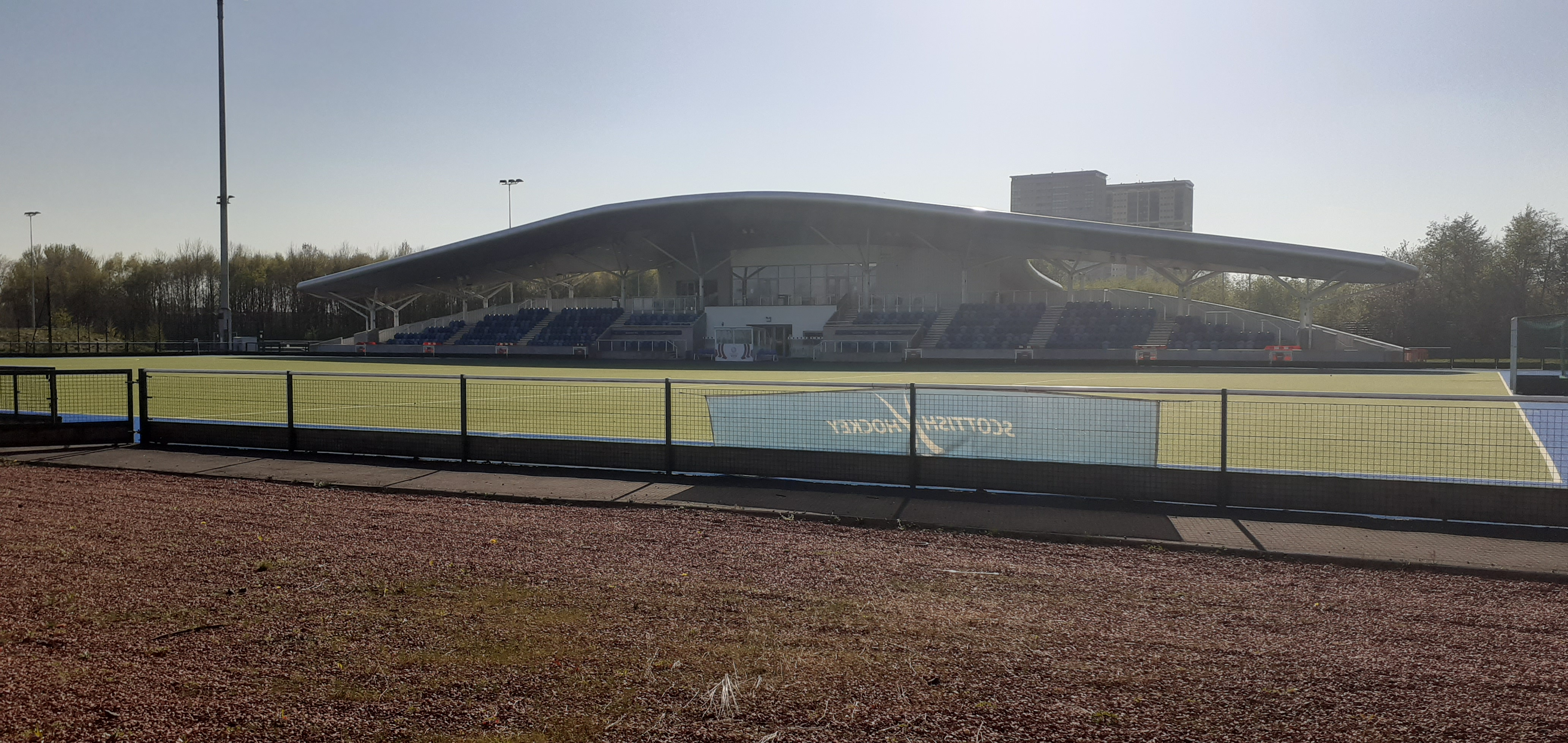
- National Hockey Centre (2021)
- Interactive map of Glasgow National Hockey Centre
- Location: Glasgow Green, Glasgow; Scotland
- Owner: Glasgow City Council
- Capacity: 514 (permanent), 5,000 (Temporary)

Construction
- Groundbreaking: 2012
- Opened: 2013
- General contractor: Sir Robert McAlpine

Tenants
- 2014 Commonwealth Games; Rottenrow Hockey Club

Glasgow National Hockey Centre is a facility for playing field hockey, situated on Glasgow Green in Glasgow, United Kingdom. The facility was constructed for the Commonwealth Games in 2014. The facility includes two synthetic hockey pitches, player facilities and a permanent stand for spectators. It also has office space which is the new home of Scottish Hockey. For the 2014 Games, additional temporary stands were erected to increase the capacity during the Games.

The facility is used for domestic competition and hosted the 2014 Women's Hockey Champions Challenge I before the Commonwealth Games. The centre is also home of Rottenrow Hockey Club
