= HC Olten =

- Full name: Hockey-Club Olten
- Sport: Field hockey
- Founded: 1923; 102 years ago
- League: Swiss Championship
- Based in: Olten

Hockey-Club Olten is a Swiss field hockey club based in Olten. In 1923 the old men's section of the Football Club Olten decided to start a field hockey section. In 1930 they became independent from the football club as HC Olten. They play in the top division of Swiss hockey and also represented Switzerland in European tournaments.

== Honours ==
=== Men ===
==== Outdoor ====
- Swiss championship
  - Winners (16): 1933–34, 1948–49, 1951–52, 1957–58, 1963–64, 1975–76, 1979–80, 1980–81, 1982–83, 1983–84, 1984–85, 1985–86, 1988–89, 1989–90, 1996–97, 1998–99
- EuroHockey Club Challenge I
  - Runners-up (1): 1999
- Swiss Cup
  - Winners (11): 1942, 1946, 1952, 1964, 1979, 1982, 1983, 1997, 1998, 2000, 2006
- EuroHockey Cup Winners Challenge
  - Winners (1): 1998

==== Indoor ====
- Swiss championship
  - Winners (3): 1984–85, 1993–94, 2024–25

=== Women ===
==== Outdoor ====
- Swiss championship
  - Winners (2): 2009–10, 2020–21
- Swiss Cup
  - Winners (5): 1993, 1999, 2006, 2008, 2009

==== Indoor ====
- Swiss championship
  - Winners (2): 2005–06, 2024–25
