= 2025–26 Men's Belgian Hockey League =

Field hockey league season

Belgian Hockey League
- Season: 2025–26
- Dates: 7 September 2025 – 24 May 2026
- Champions: Waterloo Ducks (6th title)
- Relegated: Old Club; Pingouin
- Euro Hockey League: Braxgata; Waterloo Ducks; Orée
- Matches: 139
- Goals: 755 (5.43 per match)
- Top goalscorer: (Argentina) Tomás Domene (41 goals)
- Biggest home win: Orée 8–0 Pingouin
- Biggest away win: Pingouin 1–10 Waterloo Ducks

The 2025–26 Men's Belgian Hockey League is the 106th season of the Men's Belgian Hockey League, the top men's Belgian field hockey league.

The season started on 7 September 2025 and will conclude on 24 May 2025 with the second match of the championship final. Gantoise is the three-time defending champions.

== Teams ==
2025–26 Men's Belgian Hockey League teams
Location of Brussels teams in the 2025–26 Men's Belgian Hockey League

Old Club and Pingouin are the two promoted clubs from the 2024–25 National 1, replacing Daring and Namur.

Team	Location	Province
Beerschot	Kontich	Antwerp
Braxgata	Boom	Antwerp
Dragons	Brasschaat	Antwerp
Gantoise	Ghent	East Flanders
Herakles	Lier	Antwerp
Léopold	Uccle	Brussels
Old Club	Liège	Liège
Orée	Woluwe-Saint-Pierre	Brussels
Pingouin	Nivelles	Walloon Brabant
Racing	Uccle	Brussels
Uccle Sport	Uccle	Brussels
Waterloo Ducks	Waterloo	Walloon Brabant

=== Number of teams by provinces ===
Province	Number of teams	Team(s)
Brussels	4	Léopold, Orée, Racing, Uccle Sport
Antwerp	4	Beerschot, Braxgata, Dragons, Herakles
Walloon Brabant	2	Pingouin, Waterloo Ducks
East Flanders	1	Gantoise
Liège	1	Old Club
Total	12	

== Regular season ==
=== Standings ===
Pos	Team	Pld	W	D	L	GF	GA	GD	Pts	Qualification or relegation
1	Braxgata	22	15	4	3	73	44	+29	49	Qualification for the Euro Hockey League Final12
2	Orée	22	13	6	3	84	49	+35	45	Qualification for the Euro Hockey League preliminary round
3	Waterloo Ducks (C)	22	13	5	4	67	45	+22	44	Qualification for the Euro Hockey League Final12
4	Gantoise	22	12	7	3	83	48	+35	43	Qualification for the play-offs
5	Herakles	22	12	6	4	75	49	+26	42	
6	Léopold	22	10	5	7	60	49	+11	35	
7	Dragons	22	6	9	7	49	53	−4	27	
8	Beerschot	22	6	7	9	52	59	−7	25	
9	Uccle Sport	22	5	8	9	55	61	−6	23	
10	Racing (O)	22	4	5	13	52	66	−14	17	Qualification for the relegation play-offs
11	Old Club (R)	22	1	4	17	47	106	−59	7	Relegation to the National 1
12	Pingouin (R)	22	1	2	19	33	101	−68	5	Relegation to the National 1

Updated to match(es) played on completed. Source: Flashscore
Rules for classification: 1) points; 2) matches won; 3) goal difference; 4) goals for; 5) head-to-head result.
(C) Champions; (O) Play-off winners; (R) Relegated

=== Results ===
Home \ Away	BEE	BRA	DRA	GAN	HER	LEO	OLD	ORE	PIN	RAC	UCC	WAT
Beerschot	—	2–2	1–2	3–3	0–2	4–5	3–1	3–5	4–2	2–2 (Note: Due to the Racing participation at the 2nd round of the 2025–26 Belgian Hockey League Cup, the Beerschot - Racing match of matchday 13 is advanced to 29 October.)	3–2	3–4
Braxgata	3–0	—	3–1	3–4	3–3	4–1 (Note: Due to their participation at the 2025–26 Men's Euro Hockey League KO16, the Braxgata - Léopold match of matchday 7 is postponed to 31 October.)	7–2	5–2	5–2	2–1	4–2	3–2
Dragons	2–2	4–3	—	2–2	2–2	2–3	1–0	1–6	5–0	3–3	3–3	2–2
Gantoise	3–3	1–4	2–0	—	5–2	3–1	7–1	1–0	6–0	6–1	5–1	2–4
Herakles	1–3	2–2	4–3	5–3	—	3–0	7–1 (Note: Due to the Old Club participation at the 2nd round of the 2025–26 Belgian Hockey League Cup, the Herakles - Old Club match of matchday 13 is advanced to 30 October.)	3–3	6–0	3–3	4–3	4–4
Léopold	2–2	3–0	4–1	2–2	0–4	—	7–1	2–3	4–1	2–1	3–3	2–2
Old Club	3–3	3–5	2–2	3–9	1–4	2–7	—	2–4	4–4	4–3	6–7	2–3
Orée	6–2	2–2	3–3	3–3	4–3	5–5	8–1	—	8–0	5–2	2–2	2–3
Pingouin	1–3	1–3	1–4	2–5	2–5	2–3	4–2	0–3	—	2–4	0–4	1–10
Racing	4–3	2–4	2–3	2–5	2–3	0–2	5–2	2–3	6–3	—	3–4	1–2
Uccle Sport	1–2	2–3	3–3	3–3	2–4	2–1	2–2	2–4	2–2	1–1	—	3–1
Waterloo Ducks	3–1	2–3	2–0	3–3 (Note: Due to the Braxgata and Léopold participation at the 2025–26 Men's Euro Hockey League KO16, the Waterloo Ducks - Gantoise match of matchday 13 is advanced to 17 October.)	3–1	2–1	4–2	2–3	5–3	2–2	2–1	—

Updated to match(es) played on completed. Source: Flashscore
Legend: Blue = home team win; Yellow = draw; Red = away team win.

== Play-offs ==
=== Bracket ===
Semi-finals
14 & 17 May
Braxgata (s.o.)	3	1	4
Gantoise	3	1	4
14 & 17 May
Orée	0	2	2
Waterloo Ducks	1	2	3

Final
23 & 24 May - Wavre
Braxgata	1	2	3
Waterloo Ducks	1	3	4
Third place
23 May - Wavre
Gantoise	1
Orée	4

=== Semi-finals ===
14 May 2026
15:30

Gantoise	3–3	Braxgata
Hendrickx 24', 52'; Hellin 54'		De Winter 24'; Walker 32'; T. Stockbroekx 59'

Gantoise Hockey Arena, Ghent

17 May 2026
15:30

Braxgata	1–1	Gantoise
Reyné 60'		Tynevez 50'
Penalties
Reyné (penalty shoot-out scored); T. Stockbroekx (penalty shoot-out scored); T. Biekens (penalty shoot-out scored); Van Doren (penalty shoot-out scored)	4–2	(penalty shoot-out scored) Kina; (penalty shoot-out missed) Murray; (penalty shoot-out scored) Duvekot; (penalty shoot-out missed) M. Deplus

De Schorre, Boom

14 May 2026
15:00

Waterloo Ducks	1–0	Orée
T. Domene 25'

Deutsche Bank Arena, Waterloo

17 May 2026
15:30

Orée	2–2	Waterloo Ducks
Labouchère 44'; L. Domene 47'		T. Domene 23'; Lucaccioni 40'

Woluwe-Saint-Pierre

=== EHL Ticket match ===
23 May 2026
15:30

Orée	4–1	Gantoise
L. Domene 53', 54'; L. Masso 56'; Ferreiro 67'		Vander Gracht 20'

Stade Justin Peeters, Wavre

=== Final ===
23 May 2026
20:30

Waterloo Ducks	1–1	Braxgata
T. Domene 2'		Luypaert 65'

Belfius Hockey Arena, Wavre

24 May 2026
20:30

Braxgata	2–3	Waterloo Ducks
T. Stockbroekx 3'; A. Van Doren 53'		T. Domene 9', 24'; Curty 64'

Belfius Hockey Arena, Wavre

== Relegation play-offs ==
The relegation play-offs took place on 30 and 31 May 2025.

=== Overview ===
Team 1	Agg.	Team 2	1st leg	2nd leg
Racing	8–2	White Star	4–1	4–1

=== Matches ===
30 May 2026
15:30

Racing	4–1	White Star

Stade du Vivier d'Oie, Uccle

31 May 2026
15:00

White Star	1–4	Racing

Evere

Racing won 8–2 on aggregate, and therefore both clubs remained in their respective leagues.

== Top goalscorers ==
Rank	Player	Club	FG	PC	PS	Goals
1	(Argentina) Tomas Domene	Waterloo Ducks	16	24	1	41
2	(Belgium) Alexander Hendrickx	Gantoise	0	23	2	25
3	(Belgium) Maxime Plennevaux	Racing	14	6	2	22
3	(Belgium) Loïck Luypaert	Braxgata	0	21	1	22
5	(Spain) Pau Cunill	Herakles	1	19	0	20
5	(Argentina) Nicolás della Torre	Dragons	0	20	0	20
7	(Belgium) Tom Boon	Léopold	11	4	2	17
7	(South Africa) Daniel Bell	Beerschot	0	14	3	17
9	(Spain) José Basterra	Léopold	9	7	0	16
10	(Argentina) Martín Ferreiro	Orée	15	0	0	15
10	(Belgium) Hugo Labouchère	Orée	0	15	0	15

== See also ==
- 2025–26 Women's Belgian Hockey League
