= Pascal Kina =

Belgian field hockey coach

Pascal Kina is a Belgian field hockey coach. At the 2012 Summer Olympics he coached the Belgium women's national field hockey team. He is the father of Belgian field hockey player Antoine Kina.
