= 2023–24 Women's Hoofdklasse Hockey =

Hoofdklasse
- Season: 2023–24
- Dates: 23 September 2023 – 12 May 2024
- Champions: Den Bosch (22nd title)
- Relegated: Bloemendaal
- Euro Hockey League: Den Bosch; SCHC
- Matches: 132
- Goals: 537 (4.07 per match)
- Top goalscorer: Frédérique Matla (Den Bosch) (27 goals)
- Biggest home win: Amsterdam 9–0 Rotterdam (24 September 2023)
- Biggest away win: Rotterdam 1–8 Amsterdam (18 November 2023)
- Highest scoring: Amsterdam 9–0 Rotterdam (24 September 2023); Rotterdam 1–8 Amsterdam (18 November 2023); HDM 2–7 Amsterdam (13 April 2024)
- All statistics correct as of 12 May 2024.

The 2023–24 Women's Hoofdklasse Hockey was the 43rd season of the Women's Hoofdklasse Hockey, the top Dutch field hockey league. The season began on 23 September 2023 and concluded on 26 May 2024 with the second match of the championship final.

== Teams ==
2022–23 Women's Hoofdklasse teams

=== Accommodation and locations ===
| Team | Location | Province | Accommodation |
|---|---|---|---|
| Amsterdam | Amstelveen | North Holland | Wagener Stadium |
| Bloemendaal | Bloemendaal | North Holland | Sportpark 't Kopje |
| Den Bosch | 's-Hertogenbosch | North Brabant | Sportpark Oosterplas |
| HDM | The Hague | South Holland | Sportpark Duinzigt |
| HGC | Wassenaar | South Holland | De Roggewoning |
| Hurley | Amstelveen | North Holland | Amsterdamse Bos |
| Kampong | Utrecht | Utrecht | De Klapperboom |
| Oranje-Rood | Eindhoven | North Brabant | Sportpark Aalsterweg |
| Rotterdam | Rotterdam | South Holland | Hazelaarweg Stadion |
| Pinoké | Amstelveen | North Holland | Amsterdamse Bos |
| SCHC | Bilthoven | Utrecht | Sportpark Kees Boekelaan |
| Tilburg | Tilburg | North Brabant | Oude Warande |

=== Number of teams by province ===
| Province | Number of teams | Teams |
|---|---|---|
| North Holland | 4 | Amsterdam, Bloemendaal, Hurley and Pinoké |
| South Holland | 3 | HDM, HGC, and HC Rotterdam |
| North Brabant | 3 | Den Bosch, Oranje-Rood, Tilburg |
| Utrecht | 2 | Kampong and SCHC |
| Total | 12 | |

== Regular season ==
=== Standings ===
| Pos | Team | Pld | W | D | L | GF | GA | GD | Pts | Qualification or relegation |
|---|---|---|---|---|---|---|---|---|---|---|
| 1 | Den Bosch | 22 | 17 | 5 | 0 | 76 | 19 | +57 | 56 | Qualification for the Euro Hockey League and the play–offs |
| 2 | Amsterdam | 22 | 16 | 4 | 2 | 77 | 31 | +46 | 52 | Qualification for the play–offs |
| 3 | SCHC | 22 | 16 | 4 | 2 | 69 | 28 | +41 | 52 | Qualification for the Euro Hockey League and the play–offs |
| 4 | Kampong | 22 | 11 | 7 | 4 | 39 | 28 | +11 | 40 | Qualification for the play–offs |
| 5 | Pinoké | 22 | 10 | 3 | 9 | 46 | 42 | +4 | 33 | |
| 6 | Hurley | 22 | 8 | 5 | 9 | 29 | 32 | −3 | 29 | |
| 7 | HDM | 22 | 7 | 3 | 12 | 45 | 55 | −10 | 24 | |
| 8 | HGC | 22 | 6 | 3 | 13 | 30 | 45 | −15 | 21 | |
| 9 | Oranje-Rood | 22 | 6 | 3 | 13 | 37 | 71 | −34 | 21 | |
| 10 | Rotterdam | 22 | 6 | 1 | 15 | 33 | 72 | −39 | 19 | Qualification for the relegation play–offs |
| 11 | Tilburg | 22 | 3 | 6 | 13 | 29 | 50 | −21 | 15 | Qualification for the relegation play–offs |
| 12 | Bloemendaal (R) | 22 | 1 | 6 | 15 | 27 | 64 | −37 | 9 | Relegation to the Promotieklasse |

Source: KNHB
Rules for classification: 1) points; 2) matches won; 3) goal difference; 4) goals for; 5) head-to-head result.
(R) Relegated

=== Results ===
| Home \ Away | AMS | BLO | DBO | HDM | HGC | HUR | KAM | ORR | PIN | ROT | SCH | TIL |
|---|---|---|---|---|---|---|---|---|---|---|---|---|
| Amsterdam | — | 4–0 | 1–1 | 4–2 | 2–0 | 1–0 | 3–4 | 6–0 | 3–1 | 9–0 | 2–2 | 3–2 |
| Bloemendaal | 2–4 | — | 1–4 | 2–3 | 2–1 | 0–3 | 1–1 | 3–4 | 2–2 | 0–3 | 0–6 | 1–3 |
| Den Bosch | 2–1 | 4–1 | — | 4–2 | 4–1 | 4–1 | 1–1 | 3–0 | 5–1 | 2–0 | 4–3 | 8–0 |
| HDM | 2–7 | 2–2 | 2–2 | — | 3–1 | 1–1 | 1–2 | 6–2 | 3–4 | 0–1 | 2–3 | 0–2 |
| HGC | 2–3 | 2–1 | 0–4 | 2–1 | — | 0–0 | 1–2 | 3–1 | 2–3 | 3–2 | 2–5 | 2–1 |
| Hurley | 1–4 | 1–1 | 0–1 | 3–1 | 0–0 | — | 3–1 | 3–0 | 1–0 | 1–3 | 1–2 | 2–1 |
| Kampong | 0–0 | 3–0 | 0–6 | 1–2 | 2–1 | 3–1 | — | 4–1 | 0–0 | 2–0 | 1–1 | 1–1 |
| Oranje-Rood | 3–4 | 2–1 | 1–5 | 3–2 | 1–1 | 4–2 | 0–3 | — | 1–5 | 4–2 | 0–6 | 1–1 |
| Pinoké | 1–2 | 4–0 | 0–4 | 1–2 | 3–2 | 1–1 | 1–3 | 3–1 | — | 5–2 | 1–3 | 2–1 |
| Rotterdam | 1–8 | 3–3 | 1–6 | 1–5 | 3–2 | 1–2 | 0–2 | 2–3 | 1–4 | — | 1–4 | 4–1 |
| SCHC | 3–4 | 2–1 | 1–1 | 6–1 | 2–1 | 2–0 | 3–2 | 2–2 | 2–1 | 5–0 | — | 3–1 |
| Tilburg | 2–2 | 3–3 | 1–1 | 1–2 | 0–1 | 1–2 | 1–1 | 4–3 | 1–3 | 1–2 | 0–3 | — |

Source: Flashscore
Legend: Blue = home team win; Yellow = draw; Red = away team win.

=== Top goalscorers ===
| Rank | Player | Club | FG | PC | PS | Goals |
|---|---|---|---|---|---|---|
| 1 | (Netherlands) Frédérique Matla | Den Bosch | 8 | 15 | 4 | 27 |
| 2 | (Netherlands) Yibbi Jansen | SCHC | 1 | 19 | 1 | 21 |
| 3 | (Netherlands) Michelle Fillet | Amsterdam | 11 | 4 | 2 | 17 |
| 4 | (Netherlands) Fay van der Elst | Amsterdam | 14 | 1 | 1 | 16 |
| 5 | (Netherlands) Jip Dicke | HDM | 7 | 7 | 1 | 15 |
| 6 | (Netherlands) Joosje Burg | Den Bosch | 11 | 3 | 0 | 14 |
| 7 | (Netherlands) Pien Dicke | SCHC | 12 | 1 | 0 | 13 |
| 8 | (Netherlands) Maartje Krekelaar | Den Bosch | 8 | 2 | 0 | 10 |
| 8 | (Netherlands) Trijntje Beljaars | SCHC | 3 | 7 | 0 | 10 |
| 8 | (Netherlands) Fiona Morgenstern | Amsterdam | 8 | 2 | 0 | 10 |
| 8 | (Netherlands) Gitte Michels | Hurley | 0 | 7 | 3 | 10 |
| 12 | (Netherlands) Sosha Benninga | Kampong | 9 | 0 | 0 | 9 |
| 12 | (Netherlands) Luna Fokke | Kampong | 2 | 7 | 0 | 9 |
| 12 | (Netherlands) Maxime Kerstholt | Pinoké | 6 | 3 | 0 | 9 |
| 15 | (Netherlands) Mikki Roberts | Tilburg | 0 | 5 | 3 | 8 |
| 15 | (Netherlands) Ginella Zerbo | SCHC | 5 | 3 | 0 | 8 |

== Play–offs ==
=== Bracket ===
Semi-finals
Den Bosch | 3 | 7 | 10
Kampong | 0 | 0 | 0
Amsterdam | 0 | 1 | 1
SCHC | 0 | 2 | 2

Final
Den Bosch | 1 | 3 | 4
SCHC | 0 | 2 | 2

=== Semi-finals ===
18 May 2024
11:45

| Kampong | 0–3 | Den Bosch |
|---|---|---|
| | | Matla 30', 44'; Burg 33' |

Sportpark Maarschalkerweerd, Utrecht

20 May 2024
12:00

| Den Bosch | 7–0 | Kampong |
|---|---|---|
| Burg 10', 34', 43'; Matla 11'; Krekelaar 26'; Van der Veerdonk 31'; Reijnen 34' |

Sportpark Oosterplas, 's-Hertogenbosch

Den Bosch won 10–0 on aggregate.

18 May 2024
16:00

| SCHC | 0–0 | Amsterdam |

Sportpark Kees Boekelaan, Bilthoven

20 May 2024
16:00

| Amsterdam | 1–2 | SCHC |
|---|---|---|
| Van Gils 54' | | Jansen 8'; Van den Heuvel 50' |

Wagener Stadium, Amsterdam

=== Final ===
25 May 2024
13:15

| SCHC | 0–1 | Den Bosch |
|---|---|---|
| | | Burg 57' |

Sportpark Kees Boekelaan, Bilthoven

26 May 2024
13:15

| Den Bosch | 3–2 | SCHC |
|---|---|---|
| Matla 8', 44', 59' | | Van Laarhoven 9'; Jansen 50' |

Sportpark Oosterplas, 's-Hertogenbosch

== See also ==
- 2023–24 Men's Hoofdklasse Hockey
