= 2025–26 Women's Belgian Hockey League =

Field hockey league season

Belgian Hockey League
- Season: 2025–26
- Dates: 7 September 2025 – 24 May 2026
- Champions: Gantoise (7th title)
- Relegated: Herakles; Orée
- Euro Hockey League: Dragons; Gantoise
- Matches: 138
- Goals: 545 (3.95 per match)
- Top goalscorer: (Belgium) Ambre Ballenghien (28 goals)
- Biggest home win: Gantoise 7–0 Leuven
- Biggest away win: Herakles 1–11 Gantoise
- Highest scoring: Herakles 1–11 Gantoise

The 2025–26 Women's Belgian Hockey League is the 100th season of the Women's Belgian Hockey League, the top women's Belgian field hockey league.

The season started on 7 September 2025 and will conclude on 24 May 2025 with the second match of the championship final. Braxgata is the defending champions.

== Teams ==
Léopold and Orée are the two promoted clubs from the 2024–25 National 1, replacing White Star and Mechelse.

2025–26 Women's Belgian Hockey League teams
Location of Brussels teams in the 2025–26 Women's Belgian Hockey League

Team	Location	Province
Antwerp	Brecht	Antwerp
Braxgata	Boom	Antwerp
Dragons	Brasschaat	Antwerp
Gantoise	Ghent	East Flanders
Herakles	Lier	Antwerp
Léopold	Uccle	Brussels
Leuven	Heverlee	Flemish Brabant
Orée	Woluwe-Saint-Pierre	Brussels
Racing	Uccle	Brussels
Victory	Edegem	Antwerp
Waterloo Ducks	Waterloo	Walloon Brabant
Wellington	Uccle	Brussels

=== Number of teams by provinces ===
Province	Number of teams	Team(s)
Antwerp	5	Antwerp, Braxgata, Dragons, Herakles, Victory
Brussels	4	Léopold, Orée, Racing, Wellington
East Flanders	1	Gantoise
Flemish Brabant	1	Leuven
Walloon Brabant	1	Waterloo Ducks
Total	12	

== Regular season ==
=== Standings ===
Pos	Team	Pld	W	D	L	GF	GA	GD	Pts	Qualification or relegation
1	Gantoise (C)	22	18	2	2	87	16	+71	56	Qualification for the Euro Hockey League and the play-offs
2	Dragons	22	17	3	2	50	22	+28	54	Qualification for the Euro Hockey League and the play-offs
3	Waterloo Ducks	22	13	6	3	66	31	+35	45	Qualification for the play-offs
4	Antwerp	22	12	3	7	51	36	+15	39	Qualification for the play-offs
5	Braxgata	22	11	6	5	43	30	+13	39	
6	Wellington	22	9	3	10	44	51	−7	30	
7	Leuven	22	8	5	9	42	38	+4	29	
8	Racing	22	6	6	10	30	42	−12	24	
9	Léopold	22	5	6	11	33	60	−27	21	
10	Victory (O)	22	3	3	16	27	73	−46	12	Qualification for the relegation play-offs
11	Herakles (R)	22	2	6	14	31	68	−37	12	Relegation to the National 1
12	Orée (R)	22	2	3	17	19	56	−37	9	Relegation to the National 1

Updated to match(es) played on completed. Source: Carlsberg 0.0 Hockey League Ranking
Rules for classification: 1) points; 2) matches won; 3) goal difference; 4) goals for; 5) head-to-head result.
(C) Champions; (O) Play-off winners; (R) Relegated

=== Results ===
Home \ Away	ANT	BRA	DRA	GAN	HER	LEO	LEU	ORE	RAC	VIC	WAT	WEL
Antwerp		1–0	1–2	2–1	3–1	1–1	2–1	3–1	3–3	7–3	1–2	2–1
Braxgata	1–0		1–2	1–1	3–2	2–2	4–3	3–0	2–1	4–0	2–2	4–2
Dragons	2–1	1–1		1–0	1–0	2–1	1–0	3–1	3–1	6–1	2–1	1–1
Gantoise	5–2	3–0	2–0		3–0	6–1	7–0	7–1	4–0	6–0	1–1	6–0
Herakles	2–3	2–5	1–3	1–11		3–3	1–1	2–1	1–2	1–0	1–4	0–3
Léopold	3–4	1–1	0–4	1–10	3–3		1–2	2–1	3–1	2–2	0–4	0–2
Leuven	1–0	0–1	1–1	0–2	6–1	4–1		3–0	1–1	4–1	2–2	2–3
Orée	1–4	1–3	1–5	0–3	2–2	1–2	1–1		1–1	2–0	1–4	2–1
Racing	0–2	2–0	3–1	0–1	2–2	2–1	1–2	1–0		1–1	2–3	1–1
Victory	1–6	1–3	0–1	1–2	2–1	2–3	2–6	2–1	0–2 (Note: Due to the Racing and Victory participation at the 2nd round of the 2025–26 Belgian Hockey League Cup, the Victory - Racing match of matchday 13 is advanced to 29 October.)		1–3	3–2
Waterloo Ducks	2–2	2–2	2–3	2–3	2–2	2–0	2–1	3–0	4–1	7–1		8–2
Wellington	2–1	1–0	2–4	2–3	5–2	1–2	3–1	1–0	5–2	3–3	1–4	

Updated to match(es) played on completed. Source: Carlsberg 0.0 Hockey League Schedule
Legend: Blue = home team win; Yellow = draw; Red = away team win.

== Play-offs ==
=== Bracket ===
Semi-finals
14 & 17 May
Gantoise	2	5	7
Antwerp	4	2	6
14 & 17 May
Dragons	2	1	3
Waterloo Ducks	0	1	1

Final
23 & 24 May - Wavre
Gantoise	2	1	3
Dragons	2	0	2

=== Semi-finals ===
14 May 2026
12:00

Antwerp	4–2	Gantoise
Liessens 23'; Lacroes 36', 70'; Puvrez 55'		Ballenghien 2'; Van Den Abeele 56'

Antwerp Hockey Arena, Brecht

17 May 2026
12:00

Gantoise	5–2	Antwerp
S. Vanden Borre 33', 54', 69'; Pastor 44'; Matthysen 55'		Jardel 22'; Steenackers 40'

Gantoise Hockey Arena, Ghent

14 May 2026
12:00

Waterloo Ducks	0–2	Dragons
		Magis 5', 61'

Deutsche Bank Arena, Waterloo

17 May 2026
12:00

Dragons	1–1	Waterloo Ducks
Magis 65'		Blockmans 63'

The Mansion of Dragons, Brasschaat

=== Final ===
23 May 2026
18:00

Dragons	2–2	Gantoise
A. Marien 6'; Verboven 69'		Ballenghien 30'; Verhaeghe 63'

Belfius Hockey Arena, Wavre

24 May 2026
18:00

Gantoise	1–0	Dragons
A. Vanden Borre 26'

Belfius Hockey Arena, Wavre

== Relegation play-offs ==
The relegation play-offs took place on 30 and 31 May 2025.

=== Overview ===
Team 1	Agg.	Team 2	1st leg	2nd leg
Victory	4–2	Brugge	3–0	1–2

=== Matches ===
30 May 2026
12:00

Victory	3–0	Brugge

Edegem

31 May 2026
12:00

Brugge	2–1	Victory

Sint-Andries

Victory won 4–2 on aggregate, and therefore both clubs remained in their respective leagues.

== Top Goalscorers ==
Rank	Player	Club	FG	PC	PS	Goals
1	(Belgium) Ambre Ballenghien	Gantoise	25	3	0	28
2	(Belgium) Stéphanie Vanden Borre	Gantoise	0	18	3	21
3	(Belgium) Astrid Bonami	Wellington	10	5	4	19
4	(Netherlands) Valerie Magis	Dragons	0	14	4	18
5	(Belgium) Dhymara Lacroes	Antwerp	15	0	0	15
6	(Belgium) Daphné Gose	Waterloo Ducks	12	0	0	12
6	(Italy) Maria Lunghi	Herakles	12	0	0	12
8	(Belgium) Louise Versavel	Braxgata	11	0	0	11
8	(Argentina) Priscilla Jardel	Antwerp	9	2	0	11
10	(Belgium) Famke van Heel	Waterloo Ducks	10	0	0	10
10	(Spain) Anna Gil	Dragons	10	0	0	10
10	(Belgium) Alix Gerniers	Gantoise	8	2	0	10

== See also ==
- 2025–26 Men's Belgian Hockey League
