= 2027 Women's Euro Hockey League =

European field hockey tournament

Tournament details
- Host country: Netherlands
- City: Eindhoven
- Dates: 24–29 March
- Teams: 12 (from 8 associations)
- Venue: Sportpark Aalsterweg

The 2027 Women's Euro Hockey League will be the seventh edition of the Women's Euro Hockey League, Europe's premier women's club field hockey tournament, organized by the European Hockey Federation.

The tournament will be hosted in February 2027. SCHC are the title holders, defeating Den Bosch 1–0 in the final. It was SCHC's first title.

== Association team allocation ==
A total of 12 teams from 8 of the 45 EHF member associations will participate in the 2027 Women's Euro Hockey League. The association rankings based on the EHL country coefficients were used to determine the number of participating teams for each association:

- Associations 1–4 each had two teams qualify.
- Associations 5–8 each had one team qualify.

=== Association ranking ===
The associations were allocated places for the 2027 Euro Hockey League according to their 2026 EHL country coefficients, considering their performance in European competitions from 2023 to 2026.

Association ranking for the 2026–27 Women's Euro Hockey League: Rank / Change / Association / Points / Teams; 1 / Steady / Netherlands / 47,875 / 2; 2 / Steady / Belgium / 31,875 / 2; 3 / Steady / Germany / 30,375 / 2; 4 / Steady / Spain / 24,375 / 2; 5 / Steady / England / 23,875 / 1; 6 / ▲2 / Scotland / 17,000 / 1; 7 / ▼1 / Ireland / 16,500 / 1; 8 / ▼1 / France / 13,625 / 1; Rank / Change / Association / Points / Teams; 9 / Steady / Austria / 11,000 / 0; 10 / ▼2 / Czech Republic / 11,000 / 0; 11 / ▼1 / Ukraine / 9,625 / 0; 12 / ▼1 / Switzerland / 7,125 / 0; 13 / Steady / Turkey / 5,275 / 0; 14 / ▲1 / Wales / 2,250 / 0; 15 / ▼1 / Italy / 0,500 / 0; 16 / Steady / Lithuania / 0,000 / 0

=== Teams ===
The labels in the parentheses show how each teams qualified for the place of its starting round:

- 1st, 2nd: League positions of the previous season
- RS: Regular season winners

Qualified teams for 2027 Women's Euro Hockey League
Entry round	Teams	
Quarter-finals	(Netherlands) Amsterdam (1st)	(Belgium) Gantoise (1st)
Quarter-finals	(Germany) Düsseldorfer HC (1st)	(Spain) Club de Campo (1st)
Preliminary round	(Netherlands) SCHC (RS)	(Belgium) Dragons (2nd)
Preliminary round	(Germany) Mannheimer HC (2nd)	(Spain) Atlètic Terrassa (2nd)
Preliminary round	(England) Surbiton (1st)	(Ireland) Railway Union (1st)
Preliminary round	(Scotland) Clydesdale Western (1st)	(France) Lille (1st)

== See also ==
- 2026–27 Men's Euro Hockey League
- 2027 Women's EuroHockey Club Trophy I
- 2027 Women's EuroHockey Indoor Club Cup
