= Women's Euro Hockey League =

Field hockey tournament

- Current season, competition or edition: 2027 Women's Euro Hockey League
- Formerly: EuroHockey Club Cup
- Sport: Field hockey
- Founded: 2018; 8 years ago
- First season: 2021
- No. of teams: 12
- Confederation: EHF (Europe)
- Most recent champion: (Netherlands) SCHC (1st title) (2026)
- Most titles: (Netherlands) Den Bosch (3 titles)
- Related competitions: EuroHockey Club Trophy I (2nd tier)

The Women's Euro Hockey League is the newest annual women's field hockey tournament organised by the EHF for the very top hockey clubs in Europe.

The competition was supposed to start in 2020 replacing the old EuroHockey Club Cup. The first edition was cancelled due to the COVID-19 pandemic in Europe.

The tournament has only been won by Dutch teams with Den Bosch claiming three and Amsterdam two titles.

== Format ==
The tournament is held at the same location as the men's Final 8. For the first time the women's competition will be fully produced for television and there will be a video umpire.

=== Original format (2020–2024) ===
The new tournament had the same format as the old EuroHockey Club Cup. This meant eight teams participated in a knockout tournament, with the losers playing classification matches for their ranking. Teams qualified for the Euro Hockey League similarly to before with the top two nations on the EHL rankings table earning two places in the competition while the next six nations received one entry.

=== Expansion (since 2025) ===
In March 2024, it was announced the competition would expand to 12 teams. The expansion will see the number of nations represented rise from six to eight for a FINAL12 phase which will take place at Easter. It means the top four nations on the EHL Ranking Table will receive two places for the FINAL12 with the nations ranked fifth to eighth all receiving one spot each. The format sees eight teams play preliminary games with the four winners advancing to the EHL Women’s FINAL8 while the losers will contest Ranking Matches for 9th to 11th. The champions from the top four nations on the Ranking Table will receive byes into the FINAL8.

== Results ==
Season	Host	Final			Bronze medal match			Number of teams
Season	Host	Winner	Score	Runner-up	Third place	Score	Fourth place	Number of teams
2020; Details	Amstelveen, Netherlands	Cancelled due to the COVID-19 pandemic.						8
2021; Details	Amstelveen, Netherlands	(Netherlands); Den Bosch	5–0	(Spain); Club de Campo	(Netherlands); Amsterdam	4–2	(Germany); Club an der Alster	4
2022; Details	Amstelveen, Netherlands	(Netherlands); Amsterdam	2–2 (3–2 s.o.)	(Netherlands); Den Bosch	(Spain); Junior	2–1	(Belgium); Gantoise	8
2023; Details	Amstelveen, Netherlands	(Netherlands); Den Bosch	1–0	(Spain); Club de Campo	(Germany); Düsseldorfer HC	3–0	(Spain); Complutense	8
2024; Details	Amstelveen, Netherlands	(Netherlands); Amsterdam	2–1	(Germany); Mannheimer HC	(Netherlands); SCHC	3–2	(Spain); Junior	8
2025; Details	's-Hertogenbosch, Netherlands	(Netherlands); Den Bosch	5–1	(Belgium); Braxgata	(Belgium); Gantoise	3–1	(Germany); Düsseldorfer HC	12
2026; Details	's-Hertogenbosch, Netherlands	(Netherlands); SCHC	1–0	(Netherlands); Den Bosch	(Germany); Mannheimer HC	3–2	(Spain); Club de Campo	12
2027; Details	Eindhoven, Netherlands							12

== Records and statistics ==
=== Performances by club ===
Rank	Club	Gold	Silver	Bronze	Total
1	(Netherlands) Den Bosch	3	2	0	5
2	(Netherlands) Amsterdam	2	0	1	3
3	(Netherlands) SCHC	1	0	1	2
4	(Spain) Club de Campo	0	2	0	2
5	(Germany) Mannheimer HC	0	1	1	2
6	(Belgium) Braxgata	0	1	0	1
7	(Germany) Düsseldorfer HC	0	0	1	1
7	(Belgium) Gantoise	0	0	1	1
7	(Spain) Junior	0	0	1	1
Totals (9 entries)		6	6	6	18

=== Performances by nation ===
Rank	Nation	Gold	Silver	Bronze	Total
1	Netherlands (NED)	6	2	2	10
2	Spain (ESP)	0	2	1	3
3	Germany (GER)	0	1	2	3
4	Belgium (BEL)	0	1	1	2
Totals (4 entries)		6	6	6	18

== See also ==
- Men's Euro Hockey League
- EuroHockey Club Champions Cup (women)
- Women's EuroHockey Club Trophy I
- Women's EuroHockey Indoor Club Cup
