= 2023–24 Men's Feldhockey-Bundesliga =

Men's Feldhockey Bundesliga
- Season: 2023–24
- Champions: Mannheimer HC (2nd title)
- Relegated: Gladbacher HTC; SC 1880 Frankfurt
- Euro Hockey League: Mannheimer HC; Hamburger Polo Club
- Matches: 114
- Goals: 538 (4.72 per match)

The 2023–24 Men's Feldhockey-Bundesliga was the 81st season of the Men's Feldhockey Bundesliga, Germany's premier field hockey competition. The season began on 9 September 2023 and concluded on 19 May 2024 with the championship final.

Rot-Weiss Köln were the defending champions, however, following the regular season, they were knocked out in the quarter-finals by Crefelder HTC. The championship was won by Mannheimer HC, who defeated Hamburger Polo Club in the final following a penalty shootout.

== Teams ==
2023–24 Men's Feldhockey-Bundesliga teams
Location of Hamburg teams

A total of 12 teams participated in the 2023–24 edition of the Feldhockey Bundesliga.

Team	Location	State
Berliner HC	Berlin	Berlin
Club an der Alster	Hamburg	Hamburg
Crefelder HTC	Krefeld	North Rhine-Westphalia
Gladbacher HTC	Mönchengladbach	North Rhine-Westphalia
Hamburger Polo Club	Hamburg	Hamburg
Harvestehuder THC	Hamburg	Hamburg
Mannheimer HC	Mannheim	Baden-Württemberg
Rot-Weiss Köln	Cologne	North Rhine-Westphalia
SC 1880 Frankfurt	Frankfurt	Hesse
TSV Mannheim	Mannheim	Baden-Württemberg
UHC Hamburg	Hamburg	Hamburg
Uhlenhorst Mülheim	Mülheim	North Rhine-Westphalia

=== Number of teams by state ===
State	Number of teams	Clubs
Hamburg	4	Club an der Alster, Hamburger Polo Club, Harvestehuder THC and UHC Hamburg
North Rhine-Westphalia	4	Crefelder HTC, Gladbacher HTC, Rot-Weiss Köln and Uhlenhorst Mülheim
Baden-Württemberg	2	Mannheimer HC and TSV Mannheim
Berlin	1	Berliner HC
Hesse	1	SC 1880 Frankfurt
Total	12	

== Regular season ==
=== Standings ===
==== Pool A ====
Pos	Team	Pld	W	OTW	OTL	L	GF	GA	GD	Pts	Qualification
1	Uhlenhorst Mülheim	16	11	1	2	2	52	21	+31	37	Qualification for the play-offs
2	Rot-Weiss Köln	16	12	0	0	4	47	18	+29	36	Qualification for the play-offs
3	Hamburger Polo Club	16	11	1	1	3	49	22	+27	36	Qualification for the play-offs
4	Harvestehuder THC	16	7	4	0	5	39	39	0	29	Qualification for the play-offs
5	Berliner HC	16	5	0	3	8	34	39	−5	18	Qualification for the play-downs
6	SC 1880 Frankfurt	16	1	3	0	12	22	75	−53	9	Qualification for the play-downs

Source: hockeybundesliga.de

==== Pool B ====
Pos	Team	Pld	W	OTW	OTL	L	GF	GA	GD	Pts	Qualification
1	Mannheimer HC	16	11	1	1	3	47	28	+19	36	Qualification for the play-offs
2	UHC Hamburg	16	7	1	1	7	40	31	+9	24	Qualification for the play-offs
3	Crefelder HTC	16	6	2	1	7	40	35	+5	23	Qualification for the play-offs
4	Club an der Alster	16	6	1	2	7	33	36	−3	22	Qualification for the play-offs
5	TSV Mannheim	16	2	1	4	9	22	38	−16	12	Qualification for the play-downs
6	Gladbacher HTC	16	1	1	1	13	19	62	−43	6	Qualification for the play-downs

Source: hockeybundesliga.de

=== Results ===
Home \ Away	BHC	ALS	CRE	FRA	GLA	HPC	HAR	MHC	RWK	TSV	UHC	UHL
Berliner HC	—	—	2–4	6–1	2–1	2–4	0–1	—	2–3	4–1	—	0–3
Club an der Alster	3–2	—	2–3	3–2	6–1	2–1	—	1–2	—	5–6	2–5	—
Crefelder HTC	—	2–0	—	—	4–0	—	2–3	3–4	1–2	3–2	3–1	3–4
SC 1880 Frankfurt	1–5	—	1–4	—	6–4	0–1	2–4	—	2–0	—	7–5	1–9
Gladbacher HTC	—	1–3	2–1	—	—	—	1–3	1–2	1–8	0–1	1–5	1–3
Hamburger Polo Club	6–4	—	2–1	12–0	5–0	—	5–2	—	0–2	—	3–2	1–0
Harvestehuder THC	3–2	3–2	—	5–1	—	6–3	—	4–2	2–5	—	1–3	2–6
Mannheimer HC	5–1	4–5	5–2	6–1	5–1	2–4	—	—	—	2–0	2–0	—
Rot-Weiss Köln	3–0	5–1	—	6–1	—	1–0	3–1	1–2	—	3–1	—	1–2
TSV Mannheim	—	3–5	2–4	7–8	4–5	5–6	0–2	2–3	—	—	1–0	—
UHC Hamburg	2–3	2–0	5–4	—	8–2	—	—	0–2	0–3	3–0	—	4–2
Uhlenhorst Mülheim	3–0	3–1	—	6–1	—	1–2	3–4	5–2	2–1	4–3	—	—

Source: hockeybundesliga.de
Legend: Blue = home team win; Yellow = draw; Red = away team win.
Matches with lighter background shading were decided after overtime.

== Play-downs ==
=== Bracket ===
Semi-finals
Play-down 1
TSV Mannheim	5	2	1 (1)
Berliner HC	3	3	1 (0)
Play-down 2
Gladbacher HTC	2	6	2
SC 1880 Frankfurt	3	2	4

Final
Play-down 3
Berliner HC	6
SC 1880 Frankfurt	2

=== Play-down 1 ===
27 April 2024
14:00

TSV Mannheim	5–3	Berliner HC
Gomes 7'; Brilla 14', 19'; Proske 33'; Wossidlo 44'	Report	Poljaric 19'; Holdermann 49', 59'

TSV Mannheim Clubgelände, Mannheim
Umpires:
Johannes Berneth, Hendrik Völker

11 May 2024
12:00

Berliner HC	3–2	TSV Mannheim
Kirstein 14', 27'; Holdermann 60'	Report	Brilla 34'; Rothländer 52'

Berliner HC Sportanlage, Berlin
Umpires:
Dirk Möller, Thomas Hinsken, Marcel Knakowski

12 May 2024
13:00

Berliner HC	1–1	TSV Mannheim
Poljaric 47'	Report	Brilla 10'
Penalties
Zwicker (penalty shoot-out missed); Poljaric (penalty shoot-out missed); Schmidt (penalty shoot-out missed); Dösch (penalty shoot-out missed); Holdermann (penalty shoot-out missed)	0–1	(penalty shoot-out scored) Brilla; (penalty shoot-out missed) Rothländer; (penalty shoot-out missed) Kurowski; (penalty shoot-out missed) Prol

Berliner HC Sportanlage, Berlin
Umpires:
Thomas Hinsken, Marcel Knakowski, Dirk Möller

TSV Mannheim won the series 2–1 and stayed in the Bundesliga while Berliner HC advanced to play-down 3.

=== Play-down 2 ===
27 April 2024
13:30

Gladbacher HTC	2–3	SC 1880 Frankfurt
Abdulla 42'; Braun 60'	Report	Hautzel 29', 36'; Gans 49'

Gladbacher HTC Sportanlage, Mönchengladbach
Umpires:
Marcel Knakowski, Malte Garske, Thomas Baatz

11 May 2024
12:30

SC 1880 Frankfurt	2–6	Gladbacher HTC
Schmidt-Opper 35'; Gans 41'	Report	Mvimbi 4', 47'; Braun 42', 45'; Wuts 58'; Schiefer 59'

SC Frankfurt 1880 Sportanlage, Frankfurt
Umpires:
Raphaël Adrien, Oscar Lohse

SC 1880 Frankfurt won the series 2–0 and advanced to play-down 3 while Gladbacher HTC were relegated to the 2. Bundesliga.

=== Play-down 3 ===
18 May 2024
13:00

Berliner HC	6–2	SC 1880 Frankfurt
Kirstein 24'; Herzsprung 30'; Neßelhauf 42'; Dösch 44'; Poljaric 60'; Franz 60'	Report	Hautzel 9', 38'

Berliner HC Sportanlage, Berlin
Umpires:
Lorenz Fernkorn, Fabian Jung

Berliner HC won 6–2 and stayed in the Bundesliga while SC 1880 Frankfurt were relegated to the 2. Bundesliga.

== Play-offs ==
The quarter-finals were played in a best of three format with the first leg played on 27 April 2024 and the second leg played on 11 May. The semi-finals and final took place at the Bonner THV Sportanlage in Bonn on 18 and 19 May.

=== Bracket ===
Quarter-finals
Harvestehuder THC	1	3
Mannheimer HC	4	10
Crefelder HTC	1	2 (3)
Rot-Weiss Köln	0	2 (0)
Hamburger Polo Club	4	5
UHC Hamburg	1	1
Club an der Alster	4	3 (4)	2
Uhlenhorst Mülheim	2	3 (5)	1

Semi-finals
18 May – Bonn
Mannheimer HC	2
Crefelder HTC	0
18 May – Bonn
Hamburger Polo Club	2
Club an der Alster	1

Final
19 May – Bonn
Mannheimer HC	2 (2)
Hamburger Polo Club	2 (0)

=== Quarter-finals ===
27 April 2024
14:15

Harvestehuder THC	1–4	Mannheimer HC
Pfähler 8'	Report	Peillat 21', 47' von Montgelas 56'; Hartkopf 59'

Anlage am Voßberg, Hamburg
Umpires:
Ole Ingwersen, Tobias Strehlow

11 May 2024
16:00

Mannheimer HC	10–3	Harvestehuder THC
Hinrichs 1', 21'; Seagon 12'; Peillat 17', 58', 60'; Weigand 33', 37', 52', 55'	Report	Reuter 27', 33'; Pfähler 54'

Mannheimer HC Sportanlage, Mannheim
Umpires:
Andreas Knechten, Fabian Jung

Mannheimer HC won the series 2–0.

27 April 2024
15:00

Crefelder HTC	1–0	Rot-Weiss Köln
Boomes 10'	Report

Gerd-Wellen-Hockeyanlage, Krefeld
Umpires:
Thomas Lange, Fabian Jung

11 May 2024
14:30

Rot-Weiss Köln	2–2	Crefelder HTC
Grambusch 11'; Struthoff 12'	Report	Wellen 44', 56'
Penalties
Prinz (penalty shoot-out missed); Prinz (penalty shoot-out missed); Mazkour (penalty shoot-out missed)	0–3	(penalty shoot-out scored) Wellen; (penalty shoot-out scored) Ignacio; (penalty shoot-out missed) Kossol; (penalty shoot-out scored) Michler

REWE Sportpark, Cologne
Umpires:
Tim Meissner, Christian Blasch

Crefelder HTC won the series 2–0.

27 April 2024
15:30

Hamburger Polo Club	4–1	UHC Hamburg
Staib 15'; Russell 29', 32'; Thörnblom 58'	Report	Kloss 8'

Hamburger Polo Club, Hamburg
Umpires:
Thomas Hinsken, Julius Heinlein

11 May 2024
15:00

UHC Hamburg	1–5	Hamburger Polo Club
Schwarzhaupt 4'	Report	Sarikaya 10'; Smith 19'; Mink 36'; Bartels 43'; Staib 59'

UHC Hamburg, Hamburg
Umpires:
Ole Ingwersen, Julius Heinlein

Hamburger Polo Club won the series 2–0.

27 April 2024
14:00

Club an der Alster	4–2	Uhlenhorst Mülheim
Newbold 21', 60'; Boeckel 26'; Rothländer 44'	Report	Windfeder 41'; Ludwig

Der Club an der Alster, Hamburg
Umpires:
Raphaël Adrien, Oscar Lohse

11 May 2024
14:00

Uhlenhorst Mülheim	3–3	Club an der Alster
H. Mertgens 21'; Windfeder 40'; L. Mertgens 51'	Report	Bruns 27', 55'; Brockmann 35'
Penalties
Ludwig (penalty shoot-out scored); Herzbruch (penalty shoot-out scored); Sanda (penalty shoot-out scored); Hellwig (penalty shoot-out scored); H. Mertgens (penalty shoot-out scored)	5–4	(penalty shoot-out scored) Boeckel; (penalty shoot-out scored) Linnekogel; (penalty shoot-out scored) Kerner; (penalty shoot-out scored) Gröpper; (penalty shoot-out missed) Hansen

Uhlenhorst Mülheim Sportanlage, Mülheim
Umpires:
Lorenz Fernkorn, Benjamin Göntgen

12 May 2024
14:00

Uhlenhorst Mülheim	1–2	Club an der Alster
Herzbruch 32'	Report	Boeckel 53'; Newbold 55'

Uhlenhorst Mülheim Sportanlage, Mülheim
Umpires:
Tim Meissner, Benjamin Göntgen

Club an der Alster won the series 2–1.

=== Semi-finals ===
18 May 2024
16:15

Mannheimer HC	2–0	Crefelder HTC
Weigand 26' von Montgelas 53'	Report

Bonner THV Sportanlage, Bonn

18 May 2024
18:30

Hamburger Polo Club	2–1	Club an der Alster
Inglis 6'; Russell 44'	Report	Linnekogel 39'

Bonner THV Sportanlage, Bonn
Umpires:
Thomas Hinsken, Benjamin Göntgen

=== Final ===
19 May 2024
14:15

Mannheimer HC	2–2	Hamburger Polo Club
Schachner 33'; Weigand 39'	Report	Russell 28', 45'
Penalties
Fischer (penalty shoot-out missed); Hartkopf (penalty shoot-out scored); Weigand (penalty shoot-out scored)	2–0	(penalty shoot-out missed) Staib; (penalty shoot-out missed) Inglis; (penalty shoot-out missed) Smith; (penalty shoot-out missed) Thörnblom

Bonner THV Sportanlage, Bonn
Umpires:
Thomas Hinsken, Benjamin Göntgen
