= 2023–24 Men's Hoofdklasse Hockey =

Hoofdklasse
- Season: 2023–24
- Dates: 23 September 2023 – 11 May 2024
- Champions: Kampong (9th title)
- Relegated: HGC; Laren; Schaerweijde
- Euro Hockey League: Bloemendaal; Kampong; Rotterdam
- Matches: 132
- Goals: 591 (4.48 per match)
- Top goalscorer: Jip Janssen (Kampong) (24 goals)
- Biggest home win: Rotterdam 12–0 HGC
- Biggest away win: HGC 0–9 Oranje-Rood
- Highest scoring: Rotterdam 12–0 HGC

The 2023–24 Men's Hoofdklasse Hockey, also known as the Tulp Hoofdklasse Men for sponsorship reasons, was the 51st season of the Men's Hoofdklasse Hockey, the top Dutch field hockey league. It began on 23 September 2023 and concluded on 11 May 2024 with the second match of the championship final.

Pinoké were the defending champions, they won their first national title by defeating Bloemendaal 5–1 on aggregate in the 2022–23 championship final. Pinoké were not able to defend their title after they failed to qualify for the championship play-offs. The final was played between Kampong and Rotterdam, Kampong won their ninth Dutch national by defeating Rotterdam 4–3 on aggregate.

== Teams ==
2023–24 Men's Hoofdklasse teams

Twelve teams competed in the league - the top nine teams from the previous season, the winner of the 2022–23 Promotieklasse and the two winners of the 2022–23 relegation play-offs. Laren won the 2022–23 Promotieklasse and replaced Voordaan.

=== Accommodation and locations ===
| Team | Location | Province | Accommodation |
|---|---|---|---|
| Amsterdam | Amstelveen | North Holland | Wagener Stadium |
| Bloemendaal | Bloemendaal | North Holland | Sportpark 't Kopje |
| Den Bosch | 's-Hertogenbosch | North Brabant | Sportpark Oosterplas |
| HDM | The Hague | South Holland | Sportpark Duinzigt |
| HGC | Wassenaar | South Holland | De Roggewoning |
| Kampong | Utrecht | Utrecht | De Klapperboom |
| Klein Zwitserland | The Hague | South Holland | Sportpark Klein Zwitserland |
| Oranje-Rood | Eindhoven | North Brabant | Sportpark Aalsterweg |
| Pinoké | Amstelveen | North Holland | Amsterdamse Bos |
| Rotterdam | Rotterdam | South Holland | Hazelaarweg Stadion |
| Schaerweijde | Zeist | Utrecht | Sportpark Krakelingweg |
| Laren | Laren | North Holland | Sportpark Eemnesserweg |

=== Personnel ===
| Team | Trainer-coach | Captain |
|---|---|---|
| Amsterdam | (Netherlands) Taco van den Honert | (Netherlands) Boris Burkhardt |
| Bloemendaal | (Netherlands) Rick Mathijssen | (Netherlands) Thierry Brinkman |
| Den Bosch | (Netherlands) Nanco Jansonius | (Netherlands) Jasper Tukkers |
| HDM | (Netherlands) Eric van Driel | (Netherlands) Cédric de Gier (Netherlands) Sander Groenheijde |
| HGC | (Netherlands) Floris van der Linden (Netherlands) David van Ass | (Netherlands) Seve van Ass |
| Kampong | (Netherlands) Tim Oudenaller | (Netherlands) Lars Balk (Netherlands) Jonas de Geus |
| Klein Zwitserland | (Netherlands) Omar Schlingemann | (Germany) Marco Miltkau (Netherlands) David Huussen |
| Laren | (Argentina) Lucas Rey | (Netherlands) Pieter Paul Houting |
| Oranje-Rood | (Belgium) Jeroen Baart | (Netherlands) Joep de Mol |
| Pinoké | (Netherlands) Jesse Mahieu | (Netherlands) Jannis van Hattum |
| Rotterdam | (Germany) Robin Rösch | (Netherlands) Jeroen Hertzberger |
| Schaerweijde | (Netherlands) Albert-Kees Manenschijn | (Netherlands) Jan de Wijkerslooth |

=== Managerial changes ===
| Team | Outgoing trainer-coach | Manner of departure | Date of vacancy | Position in the table | Incoming trainer-coach | Date of appointment |
|---|---|---|---|---|---|---|
| Amsterdam | (Netherlands) Alexander Cox | End of contract | 29 May 2023 | Pre-season | (Netherlands) Taco van den Honert | 30 May 2023 |
| Laren | (Netherlands) Nanco Jansonius | Signed by Den Bosch | 29 May 2023 | Pre-season | (Argentina) Lucas Rey | 30 May 2023 |
| Den Bosch | (Netherlands) Marc Lammers | Assigned a new role | 29 May 2023 | Pre-season | (Netherlands) Nanco Jansonius | 30 May 2023 |
| HGC | (Netherlands) Bram Lomans | Sacked | 22 March 2024 | 9th | (Netherlands) Floris van der Linden (Netherlands) David van Ass | 22 March 2024 |

=== Number of teams by province ===
| Province | Number of teams | Teams |
|---|---|---|
| South Holland | 4 | HDM, HGC, Klein Zwitserland and Rotterdam |
| North Holland | 4 | Amsterdam, Bloemendaal, Pinoké and Laren |
| Utrecht | 2 | Kampong, Schaerweijde |
| North Brabant | 2 | Den Bosch and Oranje-Rood |
| Total | 12 | |

== Regular season ==
=== Standings ===
| Pos | Team | Pld | W | D | L | GF | GA | GD | Pts | Qualification or relegation |
|---|---|---|---|---|---|---|---|---|---|---|
| 1 | Bloemendaal | 22 | 17 | 3 | 2 | 78 | 34 | +44 | 54 | Qualification for the Euro Hockey League and the play-offs |
| 2 | Oranje-Rood | 22 | 16 | 3 | 3 | 66 | 34 | +32 | 51 | Qualification for the play-offs |
| 3 | Kampong (C) | 22 | 15 | 2 | 5 | 63 | 32 | +31 | 47 | Qualification for the Euro Hockey League and the play-offs |
| 4 | Rotterdam | 22 | 15 | 1 | 6 | 71 | 39 | +32 | 46 | Qualification for the Euro Hockey League and the play-offs |
| 5 | Pinoké | 22 | 12 | 4 | 6 | 48 | 35 | +13 | 40 | |
| 6 | Den Bosch | 22 | 8 | 4 | 10 | 59 | 54 | +5 | 28 | |
| 7 | Klein Zwitserland | 22 | 7 | 4 | 11 | 35 | 42 | −7 | 25 | |
| 8 | Amsterdam | 22 | 6 | 4 | 12 | 40 | 53 | −13 | 22 | |
| 9 | HDM | 22 | 5 | 6 | 11 | 43 | 59 | −16 | 21 | |
| 10 | HGC (R) | 22 | 3 | 7 | 12 | 34 | 74 | −40 | 16 | Qualification for the relegation play-offs |
| 11 | Laren (R) | 22 | 3 | 3 | 16 | 30 | 67 | −37 | 12 | Qualification for the relegation play-offs |
| 12 | Schaerweijde (R) | 22 | 3 | 3 | 16 | 24 | 68 | −44 | 12 | Relegation to the Promotieklasse |

Source: Flashscore
Rules for classification: 1) points; 2) matches won; 3) goal difference; 4) goals for; 5) head-to-head result.
(C) Champions; (R) Relegated

=== Results ===
| Home \ Away | AMS | BLO | DB | HDM | HGC | KAM | KZ | LAR | OR | PIN | ROT | SCH |
|---|---|---|---|---|---|---|---|---|---|---|---|---|
| Amsterdam | — | 0–1 | 1–1 | 5–2 | 0–1 | 0–1 | 1–4 | 2–1 | 2–3 | 1–4 | 2–4 | 5–0 |
| Bloemendaal | 7–1 | — | 2–1 | 9–2 | 1–1 | 3–1 | 2–0 | 5–2 | 3–3 | 3–2 | 4–2 | 7–1 |
| Den Bosch | 3–3 | 2–3 | — | 3–1 | 4–4 | 4–1 | 2–3 | 4–1 | 2–3 | 5–2 | 3–7 | 5–0 |
| HDM | 1–1 | 2–4 | 1–2 | — | 3–3 | 2–2 | 1–1 | 5–1 | 1–2 | 0–2 | 2–4 | 2–1 |
| HGC | 3–3 | 2–6 | 2–4 | 1–3 | — | 0–4 | 2–3 | 3–3 | 0–9 | 1–1 | 2–4 | 4–1 |
| Kampong | 5–2 | 0–2 | 3–1 | 5–4 | 3–0 | — | 0–1 | 6–1 | 2–3 | 2–0 | 1–0 | 2–1 |
| Klein Zwitserland | 0–1 | 3–5 | 2–1 | 1–1 | 1–2 | 2–2 | — | 1–2 | 1–4 | 1–2 | 1–1 | 2–1 |
| Laren | 1–2 | 1–2 | 3–1 | 2–4 | 2–1 | 2–7 | 1–2 | — | 1–5 | 0–1 | 3–7 | 0–1 |
| Oranje-Rood | 4–2 | 2–2 | 3–2 | 2–1 | 3–0 | 0–2 | 3–2 | 2–2 | — | 1–2 | 6–3 | 3–1 |
| Pinoké | 2–0 | 2–1 | 4–4 | 1–1 | 3–1 | 3–5 | 4–2 | 4–0 | 1–3 | — | 2–1 | 4–0 |
| Rotterdam | 4–2 | 4–2 | 2–1 | 4–0 | 12–0 | 1–2 | 1–0 | 1–0 | 2–1 | 2–1 | — | 0–1 |
| Schaerweijde | 1–4 | 0–4 | 3–4 | 3–4 | 1–1 | 0–7 | 3–2 | 1–1 | 0–1 | 1–1 | 3–5 | — |

Source: Flashscore
Legend: Blue = home team win; Yellow = draw; Red = away team win.

=== Top goalscorers ===
| Rank | Player | Club | FG | PC | PS | Goals |
|---|---|---|---|---|---|---|
| 1 | (Netherlands) Jip Janssen | Kampong | 1 | 20 | 3 | 24 |
| 2 | (Netherlands) Jeroen Hertzberger | Rotterdam | 11 | 8 | 3 | 22 |
| 3 | (Netherlands) Boris Burkhardt | Amsterdam | 8 | 12 | 1 | 21 |
| 4 | (Netherlands) Timo Boers | Den Bosch | 1 | 15 | 2 | 18 |
| 5 | (New Zealand) Sam Lane | Oranje-Rood | 7 | 8 | 0 | 15 |
| 6 | (Netherlands) Thierry Brinkman | Bloemendaal | 13 | 1 | 0 | 14 |
| 6 | (Netherlands) Joep Troost | Pinoké | 7 | 7 | 0 | 14 |
| 8 | (Netherlands) Koen Bijen | Den Bosch | 11 | 2 | 0 | 13 |
| 9 | (Netherlands) Duco Telgenkamp | Kampong | 11 | 1 | 0 | 12 |
| 9 | (Spain) Marc Miralles | Bloemendaal | 4 | 5 | 3 | 12 |
| 9 | (Belgium) Alexander Hendrickx | Pinoké | 0 | 10 | 2 | 12 |

== Play–offs ==
=== Bracket ===
Semi-finals
Bloemendaal | 2 | 1 | 3
Rotterdam | 1 | 3 | 4
Oranje-Rood | 0 | 2 | 2
Kampong | 1 | 4 | 5

Final
Rotterdam | 1 | 2 | 3
Kampong | 2 | 2 | 4

=== Semi-finals ===
18 May 2024
18:00

| Rotterdam | 1–2 | Bloemendaal |
|---|---|---|
| T. van der Heijden 14' | | Hiebendaal 6'; Van der Veen 41' |

Hazelaarweg Stadion, Rotterdam

20 May 2024
14:00

| Bloemendaal | 1–3 | Rotterdam |
|---|---|---|
| Schut 7' | | 3' Hortensius; 21' Lucieer; 60' Hoedemakers |

Sportpark 't Kopje, Bloemendaal

Rotterdam won 4–3 on aggregate.

18 May 2024
14:00

| Kampong | 1–0 | Oranje-Rood |
|---|---|---|
| Marree 5' |

Sportpark Maarschalkerweerd, Utrecht

20 May 2024
18:00

| Oranje-Rood | 2–4 | Kampong |
|---|---|---|
| Stockbroekx 11'; Bams 55' | | Van Bijnen 4'; Janssen 25', 44'; Telgenkamp 54' |

Sportpark Aalsterweg, Eindhoven

Kampong won 5–2 on aggregate.

=== Final ===
25 May 2024
16:00

| Rotterdam | 1–2 | Kampong |
|---|---|---|
| Hertzberger 34' | Report | Lageman 7'; Janssen 56' |

Hazelaarweg Stadion, Rotterdam

26 May 2024
16:00

| Kampong | 2–2 | Rotterdam |
|---|---|---|
| Janssen 5', 59' | Report | Hertzberger 10'; Van Dam 22' |

De Klapperboom, Utrecht

Kampong won 4–3 on aggregate to win their ninth national title.

== Relegation play-offs ==
The relegation play-offs took place on 1 and 2 June 2024.

=== Overview ===
| Team 1 | Agg. | Team 2 | 1st leg | 2nd leg |
|---|---|---|---|---|
| Hurley | 5–5 (4–2 s.o.) | HGC | 4–3 | 1–2 |
| SCHC | 9–8 | Laren | 4–4 | 5–4 |

=== Matches ===
1 June 2024
16:00

| HGC | 3–4 | Hurley |
|---|---|---|
| Van Ass 46', 56'; Figge 51' | Report | Huisman; Voskuil 20'; Aerts 22', 45' |

Roggewoning, Wassenaar

2 June 2024
16:00

| Hurley | 1–2 | HGC |
|---|---|---|
| Huisman 55' | Report | Figge 2'; Van Ass 10' |
Penalties
| | 4–2 |

Amsterdamse Bos, Amstelveen

5–5 on aggregate, Hurley won 4–2 after a shoot-out and were promoted to the Hoofdklasse, while HGC were relegated to the Promotieklasse.

1 June 2024
16:00

| Laren | 4–4 | SCHC |
|---|---|---|
| Selles 1', 56'; Bain 11'; Schramel 56' | Report | Jaspers 29'; Sweering 34', 41'; Terwel 49' |

Sportpark Eemnesserweg, Laren

2 June 2024
16:00

| SCHC | 5–4 | Laren |
|---|---|---|
| Terwel 7', 35'; Hafkamp 24'; Empey 32'; Sweering 60' | Report | Bain 8'; Krüger 50'; Schramel 55'; Zarate 58' |

Sportpark Kees Boekelaan, Bilthoven

SCHC won 9–8 on aggregate and were promoted to the Hoofdklasse, while Laren were relegated to the Promotieklasse.

== See also ==
- 2023–24 Women's Hoofdklasse Hockey
