= 2026–27 Men's Euro Hockey League =

Field hockey tournament

Tournament details
- Host country: Netherlands
- City: Eindhoven
- Dates: 9 October 2026 – 29 March 2027
- Teams: 20 (from 11 associations)
- Venue: HC Oranje-Rood

Tournament statistics
- Matches played: 12
- Goals scored: 65 (5.42 per match)
- Top scorer: Loris Grandchamp (Orée) (5 goals)
All statistics are correct as of 11 October 2026
| |

The 2026–27 Men's Euro Hockey League will be the 20th edition of the Men's Euro Hockey League, Europe's men's premier club field hockey tournament organized by the European Hockey Federation.

This is the first tournament with a new format, with the Easter tournament expanding from a FINAL8 to FINAL12. October's traditional KO16 for men is replaced by Round 1, where 12 teams compete in four pools of three.

The first round will be held from 9 to 11 October 2026 in Eindhoven, Netherlands and the final 12 will be held in April 2027.

Kampong are the defending champions, having won their second title in the previous season.

== Association team allocation ==
A total of 20 teams from 40 of the 42 EHF member associations will participate in the 2026–27 Men's Euro Hockey League (the exceptions being Belarus and Russia which are currently suspended). The association ranking based on the EHL men's ranking table was used to determine the number of participating teams for each association:

- Associations 1–3 each had three teams qualify.
- Associations 4–6 each had two teams qualify.
- Associations 7–11 each had one team qualify.

=== Association ranking ===
The associations were allocated places for the 2026–27 Euro Hockey League according to their 2025–26 EHL country coefficients, considering their performance in European competitions from 2023–24 to 2025–26.

Association ranking for the 2026–27 Men's Euro Hockey League: Rank / Change / Association / Points / Teams; 1 / Steady / Netherlands / 47,333 / 3; 2 / Steady / Belgium / 36,833 / 3; 3 / Steady / England / 31,500 / 3; 4 / Steady / Germany / 31,000 / 2; 5 / Steady / Spain / 30,250 / 2; 6 / Steady / France / 24,500 / 2; 7 / Steady / Ireland / 20,875 / 1; 8 / ▲1 / Scotland / 19,375 / 1; 9 / ▼1 / Austria / 18,375 / 1; 10 / ▲1 / Switzerland / 13,750 / 1; Rank / Change / Association / Points / Teams; 11 / ▼1 / Czech Republic / 13,750 / 1; 12 / ▲3 / Wales / 9,125 / 0; 13 / Steady / Italy / 9,125 / 0; 14 / ▼2 / Portugal / 9,000 / 0; 15 / ▲2 / Poland / 5,250 / 0; 16 / ▼2 / Ukraine / 4,625 / 0; 17 / ▲2 / Croatia / 3,875 / 0; 18 / ▼2 / Denmark / 3,375 / 0; 19 / ▼1 / Turkey / 1,000 / 0

=== Teams ===
The labels in the parentheses show how each teams qualified for the place of its starting round:

- 1st, 2nd, 3rd: League positions of the previous season
- RS: Regular season winners
- CW: Cup winners

Qualified teams for 2026–27 Men's Euro Hockey League
| Entry round | Teams | |
|---|---|---|
| Quarter-finals | (Netherlands) Rotterdam (1st) | (Belgium) Waterloo Ducks (1st) |
| Quarter-finals | (England) Old Georgians (1st) | (Germany) Hamburger Polo Club (1st) |
| Final 12 | (Netherlands) Amsterdam (2nd) | (Belgium) Braxgata (RS) |
| Final 12 | (England) Surbiton (RS) | (Spain) Club de Campo (1st) |
| Round 1 | (Netherlands) Oranje-Rood (RS) | (Belgium) Orée (3rd) |
| Round 1 | (England) Wimbledon (2nd) | (Germany) Rot-Weiss Köln (2nd) |
| Round 1 | (Spain) Real Club de Polo (CW) | (France) CAM 92 (1st) |
| Round 1 | (France) Lille (2nd) | (Austria) Arminen (1st) |
| Round 1 | (Ireland) Lisnagarvey (1st) | (Scotland) Edinburgh University (1st) |
| Round 1 | (Czech Republic) Slavia Prague (1st) | (Switzerland) Rotweiss Wettingen (1st) |

== Round 1 ==
Round 1 was hosted by HC Oranje-Rood in Eindhoven, Netherlands, from 9 to 11 October 2026. The draw was held on 15 July 2026. The teams are divided into four pools of three. The winning team received 5 points. A draw gave both teams 2 points. A loss gave the losing team 1 point unless they lost by 3 or more goals, in which case they received 0 points.

=== Pool A ===
| Pos | Team | Pld | W | D | L | GF | GA | GD | Pts | Qualification |
|---|---|---|---|---|---|---|---|---|---|---|
| 1 | (Austria) Arminen | 2 | 2 | 0 | 0 | 5 | 3 | +2 | 10 | Advance to knockout stage |
| 2 | (Scotland) Edinburgh University | 2 | 1 | 0 | 1 | 6 | 3 | +3 | 5 | |
| 3 | (France) Lille | 2 | 0 | 0 | 2 | 1 | 6 | −5 | 0 | |

Source: Eurohockey
Rules for classification: 1) points; 2) matches won; 3) goal difference; 4) goals for; 5) head-to-head result; 6) field goals scored.

9 October 2026
13:00

| Edinburgh University (Scotland) | 4–0 | (France) Lille |
|---|---|---|
| Golden 11', 20', 40'; Cahalin 54' | Report |

Sportpark Aalsterweg, Eindhoven
Umpires:
Russell Donaldson (IRL)
Pauline Cuypers (BEL)

10 October 2026
11:00

| Arminen (Austria) | 3–2 | (Scotland) Edinburgh University |
|---|---|---|
| Steyrer 24', 30'; Hackl 34' | Report | Golden 37'; Cahalin 49' |

Sportpark Aalsterweg, Eindhoven
Umpires:
Gemma Calderon (ESP)
Manouk Bakker (NED)

11 October 2026
09:15

| Lille (France) | 1–2 | (Austria) Arminen |
|---|---|---|
| Piot 17' | Report | Kelner 21'; Terler 26' |

Sportpark Aalsterweg, Eindhoven
Umpires:
Duncan Ruzzak (SCO)
Manouk Bakker (NED)

=== Pool B ===
| Pos | Team | Pld | W | D | L | GF | GA | GD | Pts | Qualification |
|---|---|---|---|---|---|---|---|---|---|---|
| 1 | (Belgium) Orée | 2 | 1 | 1 | 0 | 13 | 2 | +11 | 7 | Advance to knockout stage |
| 2 | (Germany) Rot-Weiss Köln | 2 | 1 | 1 | 0 | 7 | 2 | +5 | 7 | |
| 3 | (Czech Republic) Slavia Prague | 2 | 0 | 0 | 2 | 0 | 16 | −16 | 0 | |

Source: Eurohockey
Rules for classification: 1) points; 2) matches won; 3) goal difference; 4) goals for; 5) head-to-head result; 6) field goals scored.

9 October 2026
17:30

| Slavia Prague (Czech Republic) | 0–5 | (Germany) Rot-Weiss Köln |
|---|---|---|
| | Report | Glander 24'; Brilla 40', 52'; Seitz 46'; Warweg 56' |

Sportpark Aalsterweg, Eindhoven
Umpires:
Marius Cuadrat (ESP)
Manouk Bakker (NED)

10 October 2026
15:30

| Orée (Belgium) | 11–0 | (Czech Republic) Slavia Prague |
|---|---|---|
| Ward 1', 25', 33'; Grandchamp 2', 3', 12'; Fauchey 14'; Kinnen 26'; Masson 27'; Saint-Martin 47'; Pitance 52' | Report |

Sportpark Aalsterweg, Eindhoven
Umpires:
Russel Donaldson (IRL)
Duncan Ruzzak (SCO)

11 October 2026
13:45

| Rot-Weiss Köln (Germany) | 2–2 | (Belgium) Orée |
|---|---|---|
| Brilla 21'; Rühr 35' | Report | Grandchamp 34', 38' |

Sportpark Aalsterweg, Eindhoven
Umpires:
Harry Collinson (ENG)
Steven Bakker (NED)

=== Pool C ===
| Pos | Team | Pld | W | D | L | GF | GA | GD | Pts | Qualification |
|---|---|---|---|---|---|---|---|---|---|---|
| 1 | (Netherlands) Oranje-Rood (H) | 2 | 2 | 0 | 0 | 7 | 3 | +4 | 10 | Advance to knockout stage |
| 2 | (England) Wimbledon | 2 | 0 | 1 | 1 | 6 | 8 | −2 | 2 | |
| 3 | (Spain) Real Club de Polo | 2 | 0 | 1 | 1 | 3 | 5 | −2 | 2 | |

Source: Eurohockey
Rules for classification: 1) points; 2) matches won; 3) goal difference; 4) goals for; 5) head-to-head result; 6) field goals scored.
(H) Hosts

9 October 2026
19:45

| Real Club de Polo (Spain) | 0–2 | (Netherlands) Oranje-Rood |
|---|---|---|
| | Report | Walker 18'; Lacalle 35' |

Sportpark Aalsterweg, Eindhoven
Umpires:
Harry Collinson (ENG)
Tim Meissner (GER)

10 October 2026
17:45

| Wimbledon (England) | 3–3 | (Spain) Real Club de Polo |
|---|---|---|
| Hooper 6'; Kaeppeler 7'; Harper 52' | Report | Avila 14', 23'; Miralles 33' |

Sportpark Aalsterweg, Eindhoven
Umpires:
Steven Bakker (NED)
Pauline Cuypers (BEL)

11 October 2026
16:00

| Oranje-Rood (Netherlands) | 5–3 | (England) Wimbledon |
|---|---|---|
| Walker 4', 52' de Sloover 7'; Reyenga 20'; Mertgens 44' | Report | Ansell 30'; Newbold 35'; Hooper 51' |

Sportpark Aalsterweg, Eindhoven
Umpires:
Tim Meissner (GER)
Gemma Calderon (ESP)

=== Pool D ===
| Pos | Team | Pld | W | D | L | GF | GA | GD | Pts | Qualification |
|---|---|---|---|---|---|---|---|---|---|---|
| 1 | (Ireland) Lisnagarvey | 2 | 2 | 0 | 0 | 11 | 2 | +9 | 10 | Advance to knockout stage |
| 2 | (Switzerland) Rotweiss Wettingen | 2 | 1 | 0 | 1 | 5 | 6 | −1 | 5 | |
| 3 | (France) CAM 92 | 2 | 0 | 0 | 2 | 1 | 9 | −8 | 0 | |

Source: Eurohockey
Rules for classification: 1) points; 2) matches won; 3) goal difference; 4) goals for; 5) head-to-head result; 6) field goals scored.

9 October 2026
15:15

| Rotweiss Wettingen (Switzerland) | 3–1 | (France) CAM 92 |
|---|---|---|
| Conrad 14'; Aebi 28'; Winkler 30' | Report | Lezcano 59' |

Sportpark Aalsterweg, Eindhoven
Umpires:
Duncan Ruzzak (SCO)
Steven Bakker (NED)

10 October 2026
13:15

| Lisnagarvey (Ireland) | 5–2 | (Switzerland) Rotweiss Wettingen |
|---|---|---|
| Lynch 2'; McNellis 2'; Kidd 19', 40'; Archbold 40' | Report | Winkler 39', 48' |

Sportpark Aalsterweg, Eindhoven
Umpires:
Marius Cuadrat (ESP)
Katie Howie (SCO)

11 October 2026
11:30

| CAM 92 (France) | 0–6 | (Ireland) Lisnagarvey |
|---|---|---|
| | Report | Nelson 6'; Kidd 27'; Lynch 32'; Aughey 35'; McNellis 42'; Archbold 60' |

Sportpark Aalsterweg, Eindhoven
Umpires:
Pauline Cuypers (BEL)
Katie Howie (SCO)

== Knockout stage ==
The knockout stage will also be hosted by HC Oranje-Rood in Eindhoven, Netherlands alongside the women's tournament from 24 to 29 March 2027. The draw was held on 19 October 2026.

=== Bracket ===
Final12
24 March
(Belgium) Braxgata
(Netherlands) Amsterdam
24 March
(Belgium) Orée
(England) Surbiton
24 March
(Spain) Club de Campo
(Ireland) Lisnagarvey
24 March
(Austria) Arminen
(Netherlands) Oranje-Rood

Quarter-finals
25 March
(Netherlands) Rotterdam
25 March
(Germany) Hamburger Polo Club
26 March
(England) Old Georgians
26 March
(Belgium) Waterloo Ducks

Semi-finals
27 March
27 March

Final
29 March
Third place
29 March

=== Final12 ===
24 March 2027
11:30

| Orée (Belgium) | Final12-1 | (England) Surbiton |
|---|---|---|
| | Report |

Sportpark Aalsterweg, Eindhoven

24 March 2027
15:30

| Braxgata (Belgium) | Final12-2 | (Netherlands) Amsterdam |
|---|---|---|
| | Report |

Sportpark Aalsterweg, Eindhoven

24 March 2027
17:30

| Club de Campo (Spain) | Final12-3 | (Ireland) Lisnagarvey |
|---|---|---|
| | Report |

Sportpark Aalsterweg, Eindhoven

24 March 2027
19:30

| Arminen (Austria) | Final12-4 | (Netherlands) Oranje-Rood |
|---|---|---|
| | Report |

Sportpark Aalsterweg, Eindhoven

=== Quarter-finals ===
25 March 2027
15:00

| Winner Final12-1 | QF-1 | (Germany) Hamburger Polo Club |
|---|---|---|
| | Report |

Sportpark Aalsterweg, Eindhoven

25 March 2027
19:30

| Rotterdam (Netherlands) | QF-2 | Winner Final12-2 |
|---|---|---|
| | Report |

Sportpark Aalsterweg, Eindhoven

26 March 2027
15:30

| Old Georgians (England) | QF-3 | Winner Final12-3 |
|---|---|---|
| | Report |

Sportpark Aalsterweg, Eindhoven

26 March 2027
17:30

| Winner Final12-4 | QF-4 | (Belgium) Waterloo Ducks |
|---|---|---|
| | Report |

Sportpark Aalsterweg, Eindhoven

=== Ranking matches ===
25 March 2027
17:45

| Loser Final12-2 | v | Loser Final12-1 |
|---|---|---|
| | Report |

Sportpark Aalsterweg, Eindhoven

26 March 2027
12:00

| Loser Final12-3 | v | Loser Final12-4 |
|---|---|---|
| | Report |

Sportpark Aalsterweg, Eindhoven

27 March 2027
12:15

| Loser QF-2 | v | Loser QF-1 |
|---|---|---|
| | Report |

Sportpark Aalsterweg, Eindhoven

27 March 2027
19:00

| Loser QF-3 | v | Loser QF-4 |
|---|---|---|
| | Report |

Sportpark Aalsterweg, Eindhoven

=== Semi-finals ===
27 March 2027
14:30

| Winner QF-2 | SF-1 | Winner QF-1 |
|---|---|---|
| | Report |

Sportpark Aalsterweg, Eindhoven

27 March 2027
16:45

| Winner QF-3 | SF-2 | Winner QF-4 |
|---|---|---|
| | Report |

Sportpark Aalsterweg, Eindhoven

=== Third and fourth place ===
29 March 2027
09:15

| Loser SF-1 | v | Loser SF-2 |
|---|---|---|
| | Report |

Sportpark Aalsterweg, Eindhoven

=== Final ===
29 March 2027
13:45

| Winner SF-1 | v | Winner SF-2 |
|---|---|---|
| | Report |

Sportpark Aalsterweg, Eindhoven

== Top goalscorers ==
| Rank | Player | Team | FG | PC | PS | Goals |
|---|---|---|---|---|---|---|
| 1 | (Switzerland) Loris Grandchamp | (Belgium) Orée | 0 | 5 | 0 | 5 |
| 2 | (Scotland) Jamie Golden | (Scotland) Edinburgh University | 0 | 3 | 1 | 4 |
| 3 | (Scotland) Struan Walker | (Netherlands) Oranje-Rood | 3 | 0 | 0 | 3 |
| 3 | (New Zealand) Finn Ward | (Belgium) Orée | 3 | 0 | 0 | 3 |
| 3 | (Ireland) Oliver Kidd | (Ireland) Lisnagarvey | 2 | 1 | 0 | 3 |
| 3 | (Germany) Jakob Brilla | (Germany) Rot-Weiss Köln | 0 | 3 | 0 | 3 |
| 3 | (Switzerland) Jonas Winkler | (Switzerland) Rotweiss Wettingen | 0 | 3 | 0 | 3 |

== See also ==
- 2027 Women's Euro Hockey League
- 2027 Men's EuroHockey Indoor Club Cup
