= 2025 Women's Euro Hockey League =

Field hockey competition

Tournament details
- Host country: Netherlands
- City: 's-Hertogenbosch
- Dates: 16–21 April
- Teams: 12 (from 8 associations)
- Venue: Sportpark Oosterplas

Final positions
- Champions: (Netherlands) Den Bosch (3rd title)
- Runner-up: (Belgium) Braxgata
- Third place: (Belgium) Gantoise

Tournament statistics
- Matches played: 16
- Goals scored: 63 (3.94 per match)
- Top scorer(s): Belén Iglesias (Club de Campo); Yibbi Jansen (SCHC) (4 goals)

The 2025 Women's Euro Hockey League was the fifth edition of the Women's Euro Hockey League, Europe's premier women's club field hockey tournament, organized by the European Hockey Federation.

Amsterdam were the defending champions, having won their second title in 2024. They failed to qualify for this year's edition. The tournament was hosted by HC 's-Hertogenbosch alongside the men's Final8 at Sportpark Oosterplas in 's-Hertogenbosch, Netherlands from 16 to 21 April 2025. This was the first edition under a new format, with 12 instead of 8 participating teams. This increased the total number of matches played in the competition from 10 to 16.

The hosts Den Bosch won a record-extending third Euro Hockey League title by defeating Braxgata 5–1 in the final. Gantoise won the bronze medal as they defeated Düsseldorfer HC 3–1.

== Format change ==
In March 2024, it was announced the competition would expand to 12 teams. The expansion saw the number of nations represented rise from six to eight for a FINAL12 phase which took place at Easter. It meant the top four nations on the EHL Ranking Table received two places for the FINAL12 with the nations ranked fifth to eighth all receiving one spot each. The format saw eight teams play preliminary games with the four winners advancing to the EHL Women’s FINAL8 while the losers contested ranking matches for 9th to 11th. The champions from the top four nations on the Ranking Table received byes into the FINAL8.

== Association team allocation ==
A total of 12 teams from 8 of the 45 EHF member associations participated in the 2025 Women's Euro Hockey League. The association rankings based on the EHL country coefficients were used to determine the number of participating teams for each association:

- Associations 1–4 each had two teams qualify.
- Associations 5–8 each had one team qualify.

=== Association ranking ===
For the 2025 Euro Hockey League, the associations were allocated places according to their 2021–2024 EHL country coefficients, which takes into account their performance in European competitions from 2021–22 to 2023–24.

Association ranking for the 2025 Women's Euro Hockey League: Rank / Change / Association / Points / Teams; 1 / Steady / Netherlands / 45,250 / 2; 2 / ▲1 / Germany / 30,375 / 2; 3 / ▼1 / Spain / 30,375 / 2; 4 / Steady / Belgium / 23,750 / 2; 5 / Steady / England / 23,375 / 1; 6 / Steady / Ireland / 14,500 / 1; 7 / Steady / Ukraine / 7,625 / 1; 8 / ▲3 / Czech Republic / 7,250 / 1; Rank / Change / Association / Points / Teams; 9 / New entry / Scotland / 5,000 / 0; 10 / ▼1 / Switzerland / 4,875 / 0; 11 / ▼3 / Italy / 4,625 / 0; 12 / ▼2 / France / 4,250 / 0; 13 / New entry / Turkey / 3,500 / 0; 14 / New entry / Austria / 2,000 / 0; 15 / New entry / Wales / 1,000 / 0; 16 / New entry / Lithuania / 0,000 / 0

=== Teams ===
The labels in the parentheses show how each teams qualified for the place of its starting round:

- 1st, 2nd: League positions of the previous season
- RS: Regular season winners

Qualified teams for 2025 Women's Euro Hockey League
Entry round	Teams	
Quarter-finals	(Netherlands) Den Bosch (1st)	(Germany) Düsseldorfer HC (1st)
Quarter-finals	(Spain) Real Club de Polo (1st)	(Belgium) Gantoise (1st)
Preliminary round	(Netherlands) SCHC (2nd)	(Germany) Mannheimer HC (2nd)
Preliminary round	(Spain) Club de Campo (RS)	(Belgium) Braxgata (2nd)
Preliminary round	(England) Surbiton (1st)	(Ireland) Railway Union (1st)
Preliminary round	(Ukraine) Sumchanka (1st)	(Czech Republic) Slavia Prague (1st)

== Results ==
The draw was held on 4 December 2024 and the schedule was announced on 6 December 2024.

=== Bracket ===
Preliminary round
16 April
(Ireland) Railway Union	0
(Netherlands) SCHC	4
16 April
(Germany) Mannheimer HC	9
(Ukraine) Sumchanka	0
16 April
(Spain) Club de Campo	1 (3)
(Belgium) Braxgata (s.o.)	1 (4)
16 April
(Czech Republic) Slavia Prague	0
(England) Surbiton	8

Quarter-finals
18 April
(Netherlands) Den Bosch	3
(Netherlands) SCHC	2
18 April
(Germany) Mannheimer HC	0
(Belgium) Gantoise	3
17 April
(Spain) Real Club de Polo	1
(Belgium) Braxgata	2
17 April
(England) Surbiton	1
(Germany) Düsseldorfer HC	2

Semi-finals
20 April
(Netherlands) Den Bosch (s.o.)	1 (3)
(Belgium) Gantoise	1 (0)
20 April
(Belgium) Braxgata	3
(Germany) Düsseldorfer HC	0

Final
21 April
(Netherlands) Den Bosch	5
(Belgium) Braxgata	1
Bronze medal match
21 April
(Belgium) Gantoise	3
(Germany) Düsseldorfer HC	1

=== Preliminary round ===
16 April 2025
12:30

Slavia Prague (Czech Republic)	0–8	(England) Surbiton
	Report	Bourne 15+', 36'; Yonge 25'; Sanders 26', 34'; Dowthwaite 41', 42'; Taylor 57'

Umpires:
Michael Dutrieux (BEL)
Lorijn de Kraker (NED)

16 April 2025
14:45

Club de Campo (Spain)	1–1	(Belgium) Braxgata
Iglesias 35'	Report	Vanden Borre 22'
Penalties
C. Amundson (penalty shoot-out scored); Pérez (penalty shoot-out scored); F. Amundson (penalty shoot-out missed); Iglesias (penalty shoot-out scored); Agullo (penalty shoot-out missed)	3–4	(penalty shoot-out scored) Vandermeiren; (penalty shoot-out missed) Dewaet; (penalty shoot-out scored) Vanden Borre; (penalty shoot-out scored) Versavel; (penalty shoot-out scored) Caarls

Umpires:
Nick Bennett (ENG)
Rebecca Edwards (ENG)

16 April 2025
17:00

Mannheimer HC (Germany)	9–0	(Ukraine) Sumchanka
Kanler 26', 47'; Jiménez 27', 28'; Kurz 29'; Kresken 51', 53'; Badia 56'; Zimmermann 59'	Report

Umpires:
Clare Barwood (WAL)
Michiel Otten (NED)

16 April 2025
19:15

Railway Union (Ireland)	0–4	(Netherlands) SCHC
	Report	Jansen 6', 45'; Van den Heuvel 27'; Dicke 45'

Umpires:
Magali Sergeant (BEL)
Gemma Calderon (ESP)

=== Quarter-finals ===
17 April 2025
12:45

Surbiton (England)	1–2	(Germany) Düsseldorfer HC
Bourne 33'	Report	Nolte 19', 37'

Umpires:
Lukasz Zwierzchowski (POL)
Gemma Calderon (ESP)

17 April 2025
15:00

Real Club de Polo (Spain)	1–2	(Belgium) Braxgata
Bruguera 21'	Report	M. Carey 37'; Van Dieren 39'

Umpires:
Michiel Otten (NED)
Rebecca Edwards (ENG)

18 April 2025
13:15

Mannheimer HC (Germany)	0–3	(Belgium) Gantoise
	Report	Bonami 44'; Van Remortel 49'; Struijk 58'

Umpires:
Rebecca Edwards (ENG)
Gemma Calderon (ESP)

18 April 2025
20:00

Den Bosch (Netherlands)	3–2	(Netherlands) SCHC
Wijckmans 9'; Englebert 21'; Krekelaar 36'	Report	Jansen 41', 60'

Umpires:
Clare Barwood (WAL)
Sarah Wilson (SCO)

=== Ranking matches ===
17 April 2025
10:30

Club de Campo (Spain)	4–0	(Czech Republic) Slavia Prague
Monsalve 25'; Iglesias 35', 41', 45+'	Report

Umpires:
Benjamin Messerli (SUI)
Magali Sergeant (BEL)

18 April 2025
11:00

Railway Union (Ireland)	1–0	(Ukraine) Sumchanka
Lloyd 33'	Report

Umpires:
Lukasz Zwierzchowski (POL)
Ben Goentgen (GER)

19 April 2025
13:45

Real Club de Polo (Spain)	1–1	(England) Surbiton
Piccardo 51'	Report	Wills 14'
Penalties
Bruguera (penalty shoot-out missed); Segú (penalty shoot-out missed); Piccardo (penalty shoot-out scored); Giné (penalty shoot-out missed); Álvarez (penalty shoot-out scored); Álvarez (penalty shoot-out scored)	3–2	(penalty shoot-out scored) Bourne; (penalty shoot-out scored) Petter; (penalty shoot-out missed) Curtis; (penalty shoot-out missed) Sanders; (penalty shoot-out missed) Wills; (penalty shoot-out missed) Bourne

Umpires:
Clare Barwood (WAL)
Lorijn de Kraker (NED)

20 April 2025
17:00

SCHC (Netherlands)	3–1	(Germany) Mannheimer HC
Van den Heuvel 6'; Dicke 9'; Richardson 20'	Report	Von der Heyde 37'

Umpires:
Magali Sergeant (BEL)
Michael Dutrieux (BEL)

=== Semi-finals ===
20 April 2025
12:30

Düsseldorfer HC (Germany)	0–3	(Belgium) Braxgata
	Report	Vanden Borre 23'; Dewaet 34'; Verlinden 42'

Umpires:
Lorijn de Kraker (NED)
Clare Barwood (WAL)

20 April 2025
14:45

Den Bosch (Netherlands)	1–1	(Belgium) Gantoise
Wijckmans 43'	Report	Gerniers 60'
Penalties
Sanders (penalty shoot-out scored); Matla (penalty shoot-out scored); Krekekaar (penalty shoot-out scored)	3–0	(penalty shoot-out missed) Ballenghien; (penalty shoot-out missed) Van Remortel; (penalty shoot-out missed) Gerniers

Umpires:
Rebecca Edwards (ENG)
Gemma Calderon (ESP)

=== Bronze medal match ===
21 April 2025
11:30

Gantoise (Belgium)	3–1	(Germany) Düsseldorfer HC
Bonami 5'; Van Remortel 42'; Ballenghien 45'	Report	Stoffelsma 52'

Umpires:
Benjamin Messerli (SUI)
Lukasz Zwierzchowski (POL)

=== Final ===
21 April 2025
16:00

Den Bosch (Netherlands)	5–1	(Belgium) Braxgata
Matla 7', 28'; Krekelaar 30', 39'; De Wit 34'	Report	Vanden Borre 44'

Umpires:
Gemma Calderon (ESP)
Rebecca Edwards (ENG)

== Statistics ==
=== Top goalscorers ===
Rank	Player	Team	FG	PC	PS	Goals
1	(Spain) Belén Iglesias	(Spain) Club de Campo	4	0	0	4
1	(Netherlands) Yibbi Jansen	(Netherlands) SCHC	0	3	1	4
3	(Netherlands) Maartje Krekelaar	(Netherlands) Den Bosch	0	3	0	3
3	(Belgium) Stéphanie Vanden Borre	(Belgium) Gantoise	0	2	1	3
3	(England) Darcy Bourne	(England) Surbiton	0	1	2	3

== See also ==
- 2025 Women's EuroHockey Championship
- 2025 Women's EuroHockey Indoor Club Cup
