= 2024–25 Men's Euro Hockey League =

Hockey league

Tournament details
- Host countries: England; Netherlands
- Dates: 3 October 2024 – 21 April 2025
- Teams: 20 (from 11 associations)
- Venue: 2 (in 2 host cities)

Final positions
- Champions: (Belgium) Gantoise (1st title)
- Runner-up: (Netherlands) Bloemendaal
- Third place: (Netherlands) Rotterdam

Tournament statistics
- Matches played: 26
- Goals scored: 125 (4.81 per match)
- Top scorer: Jeroen Hertzberger (Rotterdam) (10 goals)

The 2024–25 Men's Euro Hockey League was the 18th season of the Men's Euro Hockey League, Europe's premier men's club field hockey tournament organized by the European Hockey Federation.

The first round was held from 3 to 6 October 2024 in Thames Ditton, England and the final 8 took place from 17 to 21 April 2025 in 's-Hertogenbosch, Netherlands. Pinoké were the defending champions, having won their first title in the previous season. They were not able to defend their title as they did not qualify for this season's edition as they finished fifth in the Dutch Hoofdklasse.

Gantoise won their first title and the became the second Belgian club to win the tournament by defeating record-champions HC Bloemendaal 5–2 in the final. Rotterdam won their fourth bronze Euro Hockey League medal by defeating Kampong 2–0.

== Association team allocation ==
A total of 20 teams from 40 of the 42 EHF member associations participated in the 2024–25 Men's Euro Hockey League (the exceptions being Belarus and Russia which are currently suspended). The association ranking based on the EHL men's ranking table was used to determine the number of participating teams for each association:

- Associations 1–3 each had three teams qualify.
- Associations 4–6 each had two teams qualify.
- Associations 7–11 each had one team qualify.

=== Association ranking ===
The associations were allocated places for the 2024–25 Euro Hockey League according to their 2022–23 EHL country coefficients, considering their performance in European competitions from 2021–22 to 2023–24.

Association ranking for the 2024–25 Men's Euro Hockey League: Rank / Change / Association / Points / Teams; 1 / Steady / Netherlands / 44,500 / 3; 2 / ▲1 / Belgium / 34,625 / 3; 3 / ▲2 / England / 34,125 / 3; 4 / Steady / Spain / 32,917 / 2; 5 / ▼3 / Germany / 32,917 / 2; 6 / ▲1 / Austria / 22,000 / 2; 7 / ▼1 / France / 20,625 / 1; 8 / ▲1 / Ireland / 20,000 / 1; 9 / ▼1 / Scotland / 20,000 / 1; 10 / Steady / Switzerland / 14,125 / 1; Rank / Change / Association / Points / Teams; 11 / Steady / Czech Republic / 13,750 / 1; 12 / ▲1 / Wales / 11,750 / 0; 13 / ▼1 / Ukraine / 10,000 / 0; 14 / Steady / Portugal / 7,875 / 0; 15 / Steady / Denmark / 5,375 / 0; 16 / ▲4 / Turkey / 4,750 / 0; 17 / ▲1 / Italy / 4,500 / 0; 18 / ▼2 / Croatia / 3,000 / 0; 19 / ▲2 / Poland / 0,000 / 0

=== Teams ===
The labels in the parentheses show how each teams qualified for the place of its starting round:

- 1st, 2nd, 3rd: League positions of the previous season
- RS: Regular season winners

Qualified teams for 2024–25 Men's Euro Hockey League
Entry round	Teams	
Quarter-finals	(Netherlands) Kampong (1st)	(Belgium) Gantoise (1st)
Quarter-finals	(England) Old Georgians (1st)	(Spain) Club de Campo (1st)
Preliminary round	(Netherlands) Bloemendaal (RS)	(Netherlands) Rotterdam (2nd)
Preliminary round	(Belgium) Léopold (RS)	(Belgium) Waterloo Ducks (2nd)
Preliminary round	(England) Surbiton (2nd)	(England) Wimbledon (3rd)
Preliminary round	(Spain) Real Club de Polo (2nd)	(Germany) Mannheimer HC (1st)
Preliminary round	(Germany) Hamburger Polo Club (2nd)	(Austria) AHTC Wien (1st)
Preliminary round	(Austria) SV Arminen (RS)	(France) Lille MHC (1st)
Preliminary round	(Ireland) Banbridge (1st)	(Scotland) Western Wildcats (1st)
Preliminary round	(Switzerland) Grasshopper Club (1st)	(Czech Republic) Plzeň-Litice (1st)

== Preliminary round ==
The preliminary round was hosted by Surbiton Hockey Club at Sugden Road in Thames Ditton, England from 3 to 6 October 2024. The draw took place on 15 July 2024. The schedule was announced on 22 July 2024. The winners of the second round advance to the quarter-finals during Easter 2025.

=== Bracket ===
First round
5 October
(Netherlands) Rotterdam	9
(Czech Republic) Plzeň-Litice	0
5 October
(Germany) Hamburger Polo Club	11
(Austria) SV Arminen	1
3 October
(Germany) Mannheimer HC	8
(Austria) AHTC Wien	0
3 October
(Netherlands) Bloemendaal	2
(Spain) Real Club de Polo	1
5 October
(England) Surbiton	4
(Belgium) Waterloo Ducks	2
5 October
(England) Wimbledon	3
(Scotland) Western Wildcats	1
3 October
(France) Lille MHC (s.o.)	1 (4)
(Switzerland) Grasshopper Club	1 (3)
3 October
(Ireland) Banbridge	2
(Belgium) Léopold	4

Second round
6 October
(Netherlands) Rotterdam (s.o.)	3 (4)
(Germany) Hamburger Polo Club	3 (3)
4 October
(Germany) Mannheimer HC	0
(Netherlands) Bloemendaal	3
6 October
(England) Surbiton	3
(England) Wimbledon	2
4 October
(France) Lille MHC	0
(Belgium) Léopold	4

=== First round ===
3 October 2024
12:45

Lille MHC (France)	1–1	(Switzerland) Grasshopper Club
V. Lockwood 46'	Report	Haberthür 27'
Penalties
V. Lockwood (penalty shoot-out scored); I. Lockwood (penalty shoot-out scored); Desgouillons (penalty shoot-out scored); Piot (penalty shoot-out missed); Martinache (penalty shoot-out scored)	4–3	(penalty shoot-out scored) Landtwing; (penalty shoot-out scored) Richner; (penalty shoot-out scored) Harte; (penalty shoot-out missed) Salis; (penalty shoot-out missed) Steiner

Umpires:
Alex Fedenczuk (SCO)
Rebecca Edwards (ENG)

3 October 2024
15:00

Banbridge (Ireland)	2–4	(Belgium) Léopold
Ph. Brown 30', 48'	Report	Boon 26', 33', 45', 56'

Umpires:
Daniël Veerman (NED)
Sophie Bockelmann (GER)

3 October 2024
17:15

Mannheimer HC (Germany)	8–0	(Austria) AHTC Wien
Peillat 9', 11', 43', 44'; An. Rafi 13'; Hartkopf 25'; Poljaric 46'; Hasbach 55'	Report

Umpires:
Lorijn de Kraker (NED)
Magali Sergeant (BEL)

3 October 2024
19:30

Bloemendaal (Netherlands)	2–1	(Spain) Real Club de Polo
Wortelboer 4'; Beins 14'	Report	Schwarzhaupt 33'

Umpires:
Michael Dutrieux (BEL)
Tim Meissner (GER)

5 October 2024
10:45

Hamburger Polo Club (Germany)	11–1	(Austria) SV Arminen
Staib 3', 55'; Smith 6', 26'; Craig 13'; Bartels 18'; Russell 19', 60'; Brand 34'; Inglis 35', 36'	Report	Steyrer 56'

Umpires:
Antonio Ilgrande (ITA)
Michael Dutrieux (BEL)

5 October 2024
13:00

Rotterdam (Netherlands)	9–0	(Czech Republic) Plzeň-Litice
Van der Wielen 7'; Hertzberger 14', 23', 36', 39', 45', 57'; Van der Heijden 37'; Hortensius 42'	Report

Umpires:
Magali Sergeant (BEL)
Tim Meissner (GER)

5 October 2024
15:15

Wimbledon (England)	3–1	(Scotland) Western Wildcats
Gilmour 10'; Hooper 26', 29'	Report	Golden 20'

Umpires:
Shane O'Donnell (IRL)
Sophie Bockelmann (GER)

5 October 2024
17:30

Surbiton (England)	4–2	(Belgium) Waterloo Ducks
Walker 40'; Taylor 43', 56'; Gall 54'	Report	Dumont 24'; Domene 58'

Umpires:
Daniël Veerman (NED)
Alex Fedenczuk (SCO)

=== Ranking matches ===
4 October 2024
12:15

Grasshopper Club (Switzerland)	0–3	(Ireland) Banbridge
	Report	J. McKee 6', 15'; Ph. Brown 22'

Umpires:
Lorijn de Kraker (NED)
Michael Dutrieux (BEL)

4 October 2024
16:45

AHTC Wien (Austria)	1–4	(Spain) Real Club de Polo
Fink 49'	Report	Schwarzhaupt 8', 55'; M. Laplaza 9'; Zaldua 16'

Umpires:
Daniël Veerman (NED)
Rebecca Edwards (ENG)

6 October 2024
10:15

Plzeň-Litice (Czech Republic)	0–1	(Austria) SV Arminen
	Report	Steyrer 60'

Umpires:
Lorijn de Kraker (NED)
Alex Fedenczuk (SCO)

6 October 2024
14:45

Waterloo Ducks (Belgium)	2–1	(Scotland) Western Wildcats
Langendries 19'; Domene 53'	Report	Homfray 30'

Umpires:
Richard Hill (ENG)
Tim Meissner(GER)

=== Second round ===
4 October 2024
14:30

Lille MHC (France)	0–4	(Belgium) Léopold
	Report	Boon 21', 60'; A. Verdussen 33'; Onana 54'

Umpires:
Shane O'Donnell (IRL)
Alex Fedenczuk (SCO)

4 October 2024
19:00

Mannheimer HC (Germany)	0–3	(Netherlands) Bloemendaal
	Report	Ephraums 32'; Warmerdam 41', 60'

Umpires:
Magali Sergeant (BEL)
Antonio Ilgrande (ITA)

6 October 2024
12:30

Rotterdam (Netherlands)	3–3	(Germany) Hamburger Polo Club
Van der Wielen 6'; Jansen 49'; Hertzberger 60'	Report	Craig 11'; Russell 15+', 41'
Penalties
Hertzberger (penalty shoot-out scored); Jansen (penalty shoot-out missed); Menini (penalty shoot-out scored); Van Dam (penalty shoot-out scored); Recasens (penalty shoot-out scored); Hertzberger (penalty shoot-out scored)	5-4	(penalty shoot-out scored) Brand; (penalty shoot-out missed) Craig; (penalty shoot-out scored) Russell; (penalty shoot-out scored) Smith; (penalty shoot-out scored) Bosserhoff; (penalty shoot-out missed) Brand

Umpires:
Rebecca Edwards (ENG)
Shane O'Donnell (IRL)

6 October 2024
17:00

Surbiton (England)	3–2	(England) Wimbledon
Taylor 8'; Walker 15', 44'	Report	Hooper 29'; Newbold 50'

Umpires:
Richard Hill (ENG)
Magali Sergeant (BEL)

== Final8 ==
The Final8 was hosted by HC 's-Hertogenbosch and held alongside the women's tournament at the Oosterplas Sportpark in 's-Hertogenbosch, Netherlands from 17 to 21 April 2025. The draw was held on 4 December 2024 and the schedule was announced on 6 December 2024.

=== Bracket ===
Quarter-finals
17 April
(Netherlands) Kampong	3
(England) Surbiton	1
17 April
(Netherlands) Bloemendaal	2
(Spain) Club de Campo	1
18 April
(England) Old Georgians	3
(Netherlands) Rotterdam	6
18 April
(Belgium) Léopold	0
(Belgium) Gantoise	4

Semi-finals
19 April
(Netherlands) Kampong	0
(Netherlands) Bloemendaal	3
19 April
(Netherlands) Rotterdam	2 (3)
(Belgium) Gantoise (s.o.)	2 (4)

Final
21 April
(Netherlands) Bloemendaal	2
(Belgium) Gantoise	5
Bronze medal match
21 April
(Netherlands) Kampong	0
(Netherlands) Rotterdam	2

=== Quarter-finals ===
17 April 2025
17:15

Kampong (Netherlands)	3–1	(England) Surbiton
Janssen 11', 13'; Telgenkamp 45'	Report	Smith 30'

Umpires:
Ben Goentgen (GER)
Michael Dutrieux (BEL)

17 April 2025
19:30

Bloemendaal (Netherlands)	2–1	(Spain) Club de Campo
Van der Veen 2'; Brinkman 15'	Report	Curiel 38'

Umpires:
Nick Bennett (ENG)
Sarah Wilson (SCO)

18 April 2025
15:30

Léopold (Belgium)	0–4	(Belgium) Gantoise
	Report	Masson 3'; Casella 42'; Hendrickx 45', 53'

Umpires:
Michiel Otten (NED)
Lorijn de Kraker (NED)

18 April 2025
17:45

Old Georgians (England)	3–6	(Netherlands) Rotterdam
Jackson 37'; Carson 48'; Ward 59'	Report	Jansen 23'; Hertzberger 40', 11'; Van Dam 41'; Van der Heijden 51'; Lucieer 55'

Umpires:
Benjamin Messerli (SUI)
Magali Sergeant (BEL)

=== Ranking matches ===
19 April 2025
11:30

Surbiton (England)	2–2	(Spain) Club de Campo
Taylor 12'; Middleton 38'	Report	Sánchez 23'; García 49'
Penalties
Walker (penalty shoot-out scored); Park (penalty shoot-out missed); Rushmere (penalty shoot-out scored); Farrington (penalty shoot-out scored)	3–2	(penalty shoot-out missed) Vilallonga; (penalty shoot-out scored) Rodríguez; (penalty shoot-out scored) Abajo; (penalty shoot-out scored) Zorita; (penalty shoot-out missed) Delavignette

Umpires:
Michiel Otten (NED)
Benjamin Messerli (SUI)

20 April 2025
10:15

Old Georgians (England)	3–2	(Belgium) Léopold
Ward 21', 28'; Jackson 54'	Report	Verdussen 10'; Onana 23'

Umpires:
Michiel Otten (NED)
Ben Goentgen (GER)

=== Semi-finals ===
19 April 2025
16:00

Kampong (Netherlands)	0–3	(Netherlands) Bloemendaal
	Report	Croon 38'; Wortelboer 40'; Veen 58'

Umpires:
Ben Goentgen (BEL)
Michael Dutrieux (BEL)

19 April 2025
18:15

Rotterdam (Netherlands)	2–2	(Belgium) Gantoise
Hertzberger 34'; Van Dam 35'	Report	Tynevez 15'; Hendrickx 45'
Penalties
Hertzberger (penalty shoot-out missed); Van Dam (penalty shoot-out scored); Jansen (penalty shoot-out missed); Menini (penalty shoot-out scored); Recasens (penalty shoot-out scored)	3–4	(penalty shoot-out scored) Casella; (penalty shoot-out missed) Tynevez; (penalty shoot-out scored) Kina; (penalty shoot-out scored) Murray; (penalty shoot-out scored) Hellin

Umpires:
Lukasz Zwierzchowski (POL)
Nick Bennett (ENG)

=== Bronze medal match ===
21 April 2025
09:15

Kampong (Netherlands)	0–2	(Netherlands) Rotterdam
	Report	Boeren 47'; Van Dam 60'

Umpires:
Magali Sergeant (BEL)
Michael Dutrieux (BEL)

=== Final ===
21 April 2025
13:45

Bloemendaal (Netherlands)	2–5	(Belgium) Gantoise
Wallace 44'; Warmerdam 47'	Report	Hendrickx 28', 46', 59'; Hellin 38'; Tynevez 45'

Umpires:
Ben Goentgen (GER)
Nick Bennett (ENG)

== Top goalscorers ==
Rank	Player	Team	FG	PC	PS	Goals
1	(Netherlands) Jeroen Hertzberger	(Netherlands) Rotterdam	4	6	0	10
2	(Belgium) Tom Boon	(Belgium) Léopold	1	5	0	6
2	(Belgium) Alexander Hendrickx	(Belgium) Gantoise	0	6	0	6
4	(Germany) Gonzalo Peillat	(Germany) Mannheimer HC	1	3	0	4
4	(New Zealand) Kane Russell	(Germany) Hamburger Polo Club	0	4	0	4
4	(England) Luke Taylor	(England) Surbiton	0	3	1	4
7	(Netherlands) Thijs van Dam	(Netherlands) Rotterdam	3	0	0	3
7	(Scotland) Struan Walker	(England) Surbiton	2	1	0	3
7	(Netherlands) Dennis Warmerdam	(Netherlands) Bloemendaal	2	1	0	3
7	(England) Sam Ward	(England) Old Georgians	1	2	0	3
7	(Ireland) Philip Brown	(Ireland) Banbridge	0	3	0	3
7	(Germany) Benedikt Schwarzhaupt	(Spain) Real Club de Polo	0	3	0	3
7	(England) Samuel Hooper	(England) Wimbledon	0	2	1	3

== See also ==
- 2025 Men's EuroHockey Club Trophy I
- 2025 Men's EuroHockey Indoor Club Cup
