= 2023–24 Men's Belgian Hockey League =

Field hockey league season

Belgian Hockey League
- Season: 2023–24
- Dates: 10 September 2023 – 12 May 2024
- Champions: Gantoise (3rd title)
- Relegated: Victory; White Star
- Euro Hockey League: Léopold; Gantoise; Waterloo Ducks
- Matches played: 132
- Goals scored: 642 (4.86 per match)
- Top goalscorer: Tom Boon (39 goals)
- Biggest home win: Dragons 6–0 White Star; Braxgata 7–1 Victory; Waterloo Ducks 7–1 Victory
- Biggest away win: White Star 0–6 Waterloo Ducks; White Star 2–8 Racing
- Highest scoring: Victory 5–5 Dragons; White Star 4-6 Léopold; White Star 2–8 Racing

The 2023–24 Men's Belgian Hockey League was the 104th season of the Men's Belgian Hockey League, the top men's Belgian field hockey league.

The season started on 10 September 2023 and concluded on 12 May 2024 with the second match of the championship final. Gantoise were the defending champion. They defended their title by defeating the Waterloo Ducks 9–4 on aggregate in the championship final to win their third national title.

== Teams ==
2023–24 Men's Belgian Hockey League teams
Location of Brussels teams in the 2023–24 Men's Belgian Hockey League

Victory and White Star were the two promoted clubs from the 2022–23 National 1, replacing Leuven and Old Club.

Team	Location	Province
Braxgata	Boom	Antwerp
Daring	Molenbeek-Saint-Jean	Brussels
Dragons	Brasschaat	Antwerp
Gantoise	Ghent	East Flanders
Herakles	Lier	Antwerp
Léopold	Uccle	Brussels
Orée	Woluwe-Saint-Pierre	Brussels
Racing	Uccle	Brussels
Uccle Sport	Uccle	Brussels
Victory	Edegem	Antwerp
Waterloo Ducks	Waterloo	Walloon Brabant
White Star	Evere	Brussels

=== Number of teams by provinces ===
Province	Number of teams	Team(s)
Brussels	6	Daring, Léopold, Orée, Racing, Uccle Sport, White Star
Antwerp	4	Braxgata, Dragons, Herakles, Victory
East Flanders	1	Gantoise
Walloon Brabant	1	Waterloo Ducks
Total	12	

== Regular season ==
=== Standings ===
Pos	Team	Pld	W	D	L	GF	GA	GD	Pts	Qualification or relegation
1	Léopold	22	15	4	3	71	39	+32	49	Qualification for the Euro Hockey League first round and the play-offs
2	Dragons	22	11	6	5	58	34	+24	39	Qualification for the play-offs
3	Waterloo Ducks	22	11	5	6	68	43	+25	38	Qualification for the Euro Hockey League first round and the play-offs
4	Gantoise (C)	22	11	5	6	64	48	+16	38	Qualification for the Euro Hockey League quarter-finals and the play-offs
5	Braxgata	22	10	8	4	66	46	+20	38	
6	Racing	22	10	6	6	59	42	+17	36	
7	Herakles	22	10	4	8	42	43	−1	34	
8	Orée	22	9	6	7	54	44	+10	33	
9	Uccle Sport	22	6	7	9	48	60	−12	25	
10	Daring (O)	22	5	4	13	41	59	−18	19	Qualification for the relegation play-offs
11	Victory (R)	22	2	3	17	39	92	−53	9	Relegation to the National 1
12	White Star (R)	22	1	4	17	32	92	−60	7	Relegation to the National 1

Updated to match(es) played on 28 April 2024. Source: Flashscore
Rules for classification: 1) points; 2) matches won; 3) goal difference; 4) goals for; 5) head-to-head result.
(C) Champions; (O) Play-off winners; (R) Relegated

=== Results ===
Home \ Away	BRA	DAR	DRA	GAN	HER	LÉO	ORE	RAC	UCC	VIC	WAT	WHI
Braxgata	—	4–3	3–3	4–3	1–0	1–1	3–1	2–1	2–2	7–1	2–2	5–2
Daring	2–2	—	1–3	3–2	1–2	2–7	1–3	1–2	2–2	3–4	2–2	1–1
Dragons	4–3	0–1	—	3–0	0–1	2–0	4–1	1–1	5–1	3–0	2–2	6–0
Gantoise	4–4	3–1	4–1	—	1–1	3–4	3–2	3–2	3–2	2–1	3–4	3–0
Herakles	2–0	3–4	3–2	2–2	—	1–2	0–3	3–2	2–3	2–1	1–2	3–1
Léopold	3–2	5–1	2–1	2–2	3–2	—	6–2	3–2	1–0	6–1	1–1	7–2
Orée	3–3	2–0	1–1	1–2	1–1	2–0	—	2–2	2–3	4–2	3–2	2–2
Racing	4–3	3–2	2–2	1–1	1–2	3–1	1–2	—	4–4	5–4	2–2	5–0
Uccle Sport	1–4	3–2	0–3	3–6	1–5	3–3	1–1	1–2	—	0–0	4–3	4–4
Victory	0–4	3–5	5–5	2–7	2–2	1–5	2–6	1–4	1–4	—	2–5	1–3
Waterloo Ducks	2–5	3–0	2–3	3–0	6–1	1–3	5–4	0–2	5–1	7–1	—	3–1
White Star	2–2	0–3	1–4	2–7	2–3	4–6	0–4	2–8	0–5	3–4	0–6	—

Updated to match(es) played on 28 April 2024. Source: Flashscore
Legend: Blue = home team win; Yellow = draw; Red = away team win.

=== Top goalscorers ===
Rank	Player	Club	FG	PC	PS	Goals
1	(Belgium) Tom Boon	Léopold	24	12	3	39
2	(Belgium) Loïck Luypaert	Braxgata	0	19	4	23
3	(France) Victor Charlet	Waterloo Ducks	0	19	3	22
4	(Belgium) Tanguy Cosyns	Racing	11	8	1	20
5	(Argentina) Tomas Domene	Orée	6	12	1	19
6	(Belgium) Maxime Plennevaux	Uccle Sport	12	1	0	13
6	(Belgium) Jeff De Winter	Braxgata	10	3	0	13

== Play-offs ==
=== Bracket ===
Semi-finals
Léopold	1	2	3
Gantoise	2	3	5
Dragons	3	1	4
Waterloo Ducks	2	3	5

Final
Gantoise	7	2	9
Waterloo Ducks	1	3	4
Third place
11 May
Léopold	4
Dragons	5

=== Semi-finals ===
4 May 2024
15:00

Gantoise	2–1	Léopold
Hellin 12'; Kina 62'	Report	A. Verdussen 37'

Ghent

5 May 2024
15:00

Léopold	2–3	Gantoise
Boon 19', 33'	Report	Kina 30'; Esquelin 48'; Tynevez 67'

Uccle

Gantoise won 5–3 on aggregate.

4 May 2024
15:00

Waterloo Ducks	2–3	Dragons
Dykmans 27'; Charlet 67'	Report	Della Torre 55', 70'; Raes 59'

Waterloo

5 May 2024
15:00

Dragons	1–3	Waterloo Ducks
Della Torre 58'	Report	Charlet 2', 39', 48'

Brasschaat

The Waterloo Ducks won 5–4 on aggregate.

=== Third place ===
11 May 2024
11:00

Léopold	4–5	Dragons
Forgues 19'; Muschs 28', 44'; A. Verdussen 68'	Report	M. Luyten 14'; Raes 37', 55'; Martínez 41'; Crols 59'

Wilrijkse Plein Antwerp, Antwerp

=== Final ===
11 May 2024
16:00

Gantoise	7–1	Waterloo Ducks
Duvekot 12'; Esquelin 14', 27'; Goyet 25'; T. Clément 40', 55', 60'	Report	Petit 33'

Wilrijkse Plein Antwerp, Antwerp

12 May 2024
16:00

Waterloo Ducks	3–2	Gantoise
Rogeau 29', 66'; Dykmans 62'	Report	Esquelin 33'; Murray 39'

Wilrijkse Plein Antwerp, Antwerp

Gantoise won 9–4 on aggregate to win their third national title.

== Relegation play-offs ==
The relegation play-offs took place on 18 and 19 May 2024. Daring won 12–4 on aggregate, and therefore both clubs remained in their respective leagues.

Team 1	Agg.	Team 2	1st leg	2nd leg
Old Club	4–12	Daring	3–5	1–7
