= Antoine Kina =

Belgian field hockey player

Personal information
- Full name: Antoine Sylvain Kina
- Born: 13 February 1996 (age 30) Ghent, Belgium

Sport
- Sport: Field hockey
- Position: Midfielder / Forward
- Club: Gantoise
Youth career
- Team
- –: Gantoise
Senior career
Years	Team	Caps	Goals
–2017	Gantoise	-	-
2016–2017	Waterloo Ducks	-	-
2017–present	Gantoise	-	-
National team
Years	Team	Caps	Goals
2014–2017	Belgium U21	24	(3)
2017–2025	Belgium	137	(16)
Medal record
Men's field hockey
Representing Belgium
Olympic Games
Gold medal – first place	2020 Tokyo	Team
World Cup
Gold medal – first place	2018 Bhubaneswar
Silver medal – second place	2023 Bhubaneswar–Rourkela
EuroHockey Championship
Gold medal – first place	2019 Antwerp
Bronze medal – third place	2021 Amstelveen
Bronze medal – third place	2023 Mönchengladbach
Junior World Cup
Silver medal – second place	2016 Lucknow
EuroHockey Junior Championship
Silver medal – second place	2017 Valencia
- Updated on 24 April 2025

Antoine Sylvain Kina (born 13 February 1996) is a Belgian professional field hockey player who plays as a midfielder or forward for Gantoise and the Belgium national team. He played 137 matches for the Belgian national team from 2017 to 2025.

He is the son of Belgian field hockey coach Pascal Kina.

== Club career ==
Kina played for Gantoise until 2017, when he moved to the Waterloo Ducks. After one season with the Waterloo Ducks, he returned to Gantoise. In the 2024–25 season he won the Euro Hockey League with Gantoise beating record-champions Bloemendaal 5–2 in the final.

== International career ==
Kina made his debut for the Belgium under-21 side at the 2014 EuroHockey Junior Championship where they finished fourth. He was a part of the Belgium squad that won the silver medal at the 2016 Junior World Cup. In January 2017, he made his debut for the senior national team in a test match against the Netherlands. He was not selected for the 2017 EuroHockey Championship so he played in the 2017 EuroHockey Junior Championship.

Kina was named as the first reserve for the 2018 World Cup. He was called up during the group stages to replace the injured Manu Stockbroekx. In August 2019, he was selected in the Belgium squad for the 2019 EuroHockey Championship. They won Belgium its first European title by defeating Spain 5–0 in the final. On 25 May 2021, he was selected in the squad for the 2021 EuroHockey Championship. He announced his retirement from the national team after the 2025 Men's EuroHockey Championship, which he left early due to physical and mental fatigue.

== Honours ==
Gantoise

- Belgian Hockey League: 2022–23, 2023–24
- Euro Hockey League: 2024–25

Belgium

- Olympic gold medal: 2020
- World Cup: 2018
- EuroHockey Championship: 2019
- FIH Pro League: 2020–21
