= Lode Zielens =

Belgian novelist and journalist (1901–1944)

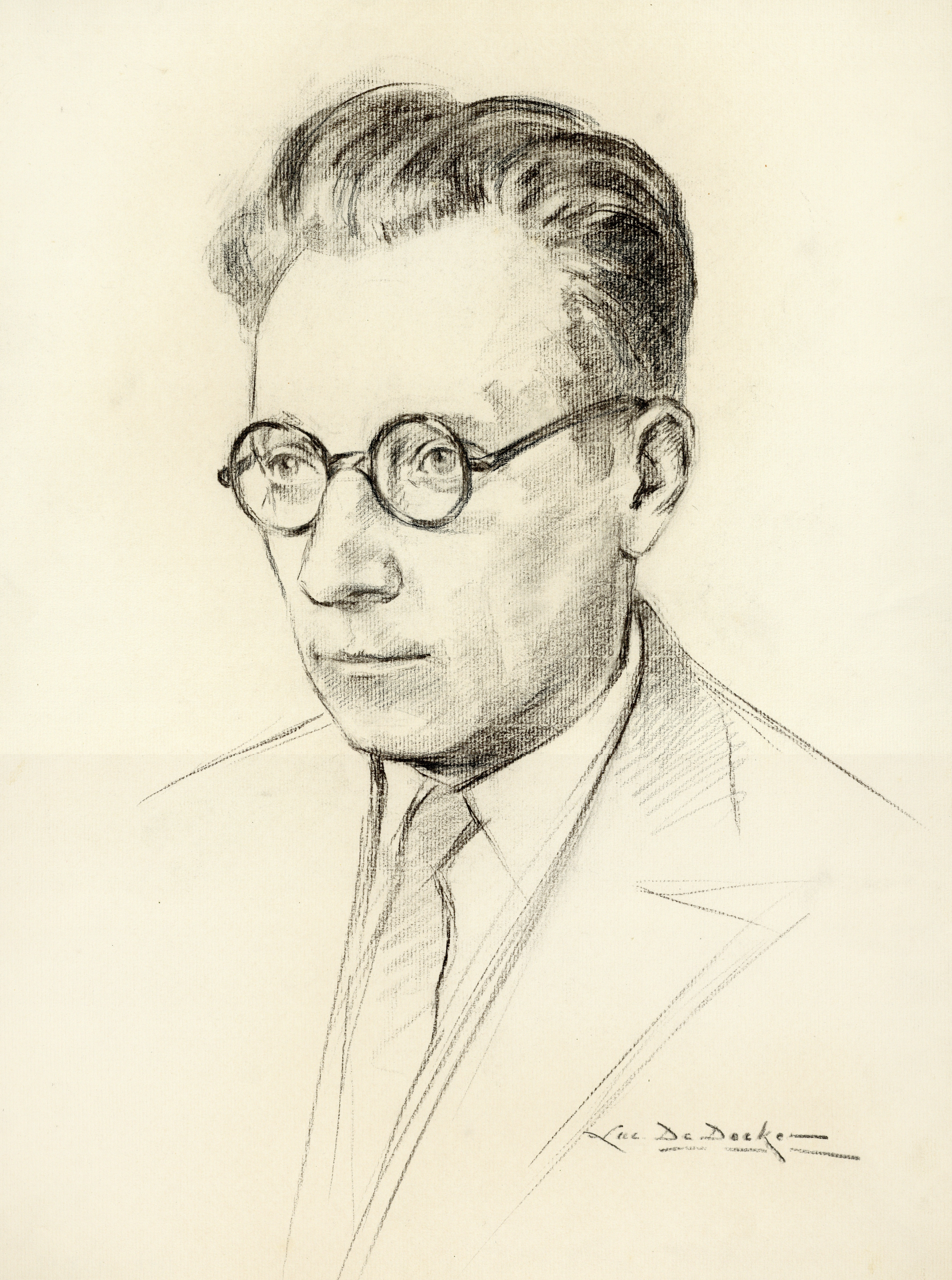
- Born: Ludovicus Carolus Zielens; 13 June 1901; Antwerp, Belgium
- Died: 28 November 1944 (aged 43); Antwerp,
- Occupations: novelist, journalist
- Known for: Moeder, waarom leven wij?

Ludovicus Carolus Zielens (13 June 1901 – 28 November 1944) was a Belgian novelist and journalist. He wrote many novels, his Moeder, waarom leven wij? being the most well known. He also received several awards in recognition of his work.

== Biography ==
=== Life and works ===
Zielens was born in Antwerp to a poor family and worked in the docks. His first work, Schoolkolonie, was published in Elsevier's Monthly Magazine. This brought him into contact with literary circles, including the writers Herman Robbers and Frans Verschoren. Verschoren found Zielens an office job, but this was not to his liking.

Schoolkolonie received a number of awards, which led to Zielens joining as an editor the Socialist newspaper Volksgazet (now absorbed by De Morgen). Het duistere bloed of 1931 was a further success. His 1934 novel Moeder, waarom leven wij? is seen as his finest work and was filmed in 1993.

Zielens was killed in a V-2 rocket attack at the end of World War II. He is buried at the Schoonselhof cemetery in Antwerp.

== Bibliography ==
- Schoolkolonie (1920)
- Het jonge leven (novellen, 1928)
- Robert, zonder Bertrand (1929)
- Het duistere bloed (1930)
- De roep (1931)(omvattend : Antoinette onze moeder, De roep van het kind, Levensbericht)
- Moeder, waarom leven wij (1932)
- De gele roos (1933)
- Nu begint het leven (1935)
- De dag van morgen (1938)
- Op een namiddag in September (1940)
- Lees en vergeet (1941)
- Te laat voor muziek (1941)
- Opsomer (1942)
- Het heerke (story in Bloei, 1942)
- Herinneringen van toen (1942–1943) (containing : Rijkdom der jeugd - Maria - Ik ontmoet grootvader - Antoinette - Muziek in de nacht - De glazen buskop - Lewie)
- Terug tot de bron (1944)
- De volle waarheid over het concentratiekamp van Breendonk (1944)
- Alles wordt betaald (1945)
- Menschen als wij (1946)
- De wereld gaat stralend open : een keuze uit novellen en schetsen (1959)
- Polka voor piston

== See also ==
- Flemish literature
