= Onze-Lieve-Vrouw-Waver =

Section of Sint-Katelijne-Waver, Belgium

- Village
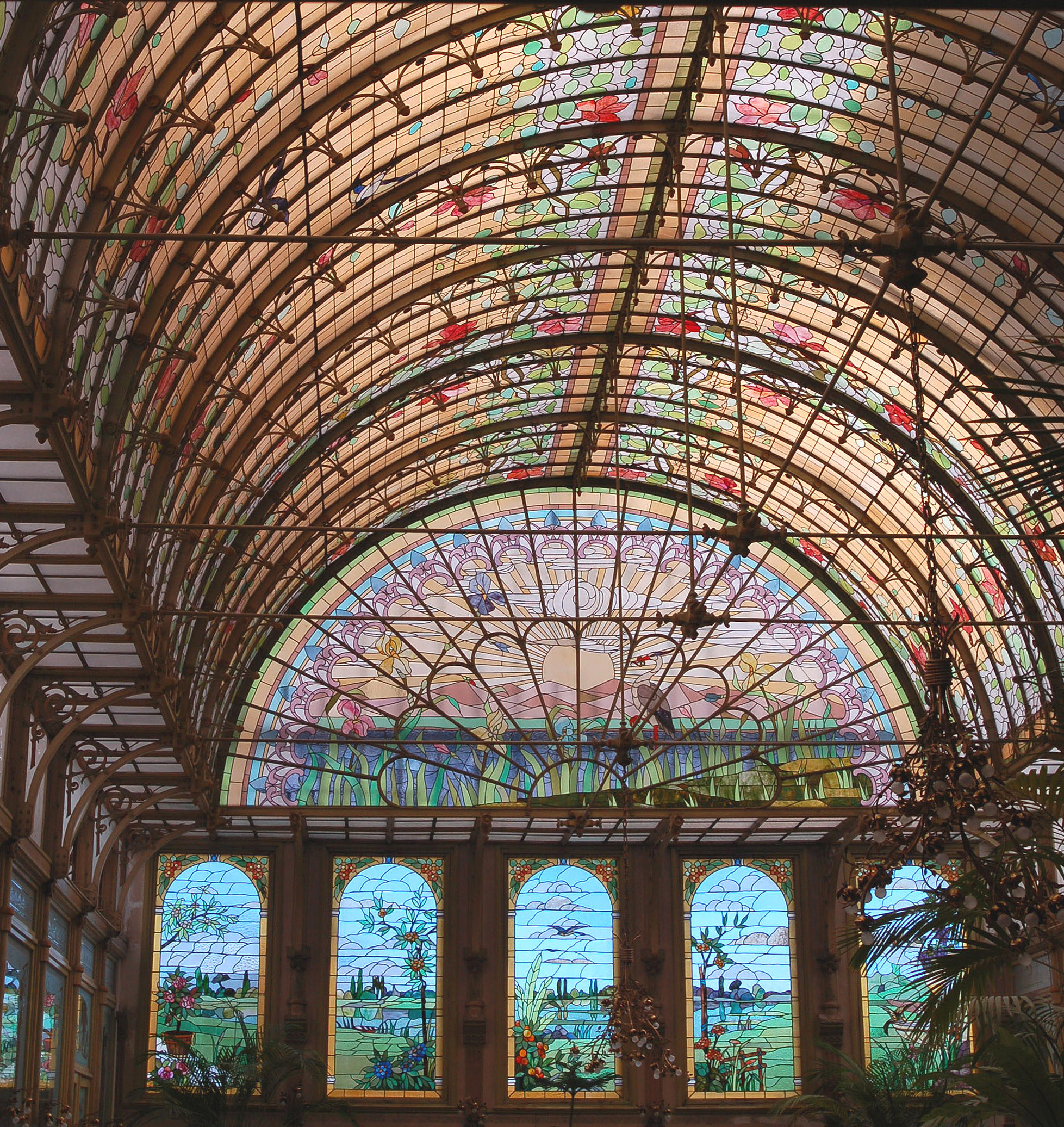
- Ursulines Institute winter garden

- Location in Belgium
- Coordinates: 51°04′N 4°34′E
- Country: Belgium
- Region: Flemish Region
- Province: Antwerp
- Municipality: Sint-Katelijne-Waver

Area
  - Total: 12.83 km^{2} (4.95 sq mi)

Population (2021)
  - Total: 5,635
  - Density: 439.2/km^{2} (1,138/sq mi)
- Time zone: CET

Onze-Lieve-Vrouw-Waver is a Belgian village roughly 10 km east of Mechelen. Its neighbouring village - Sint-Katelijne-Waver - is part of Onze Lieve Vrouw Waver, and lies approximately 5 km to the west. The village contains a neogothic church and is situated not far from the main highway between Brussels and Antwerp.

== Wintertuin ==
It is famous for the "wintertuin" ("winter garden") of the Ursulines Institute and for the church. It is almost never open to public visits, except on occasional open houses and group visits. The wintertuin is located in the Ursuline complex, initiated in 1841 and gradually expanding to fulfill its function as a boarding school and teacher training school. The identity of the architect of the wintertuin in 1900 has been lost in the passage of time, but its magnificent stained glass dome together with the interior decoration remains as a testament to the dazzling beauty of Art Nouveau architecture. All of the fixtures and furnishings of the wintertuin are original and have remained in superb condition. The other rooms of the Institute were created in different styles as was normal in interiors of church inmates.

== Gallery ==
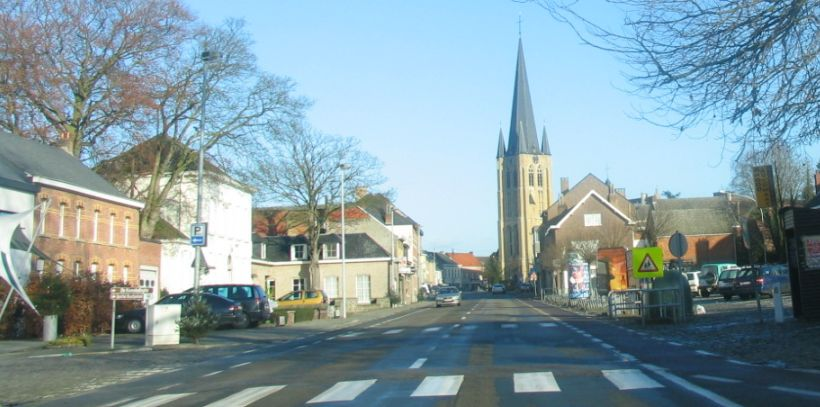
Village view

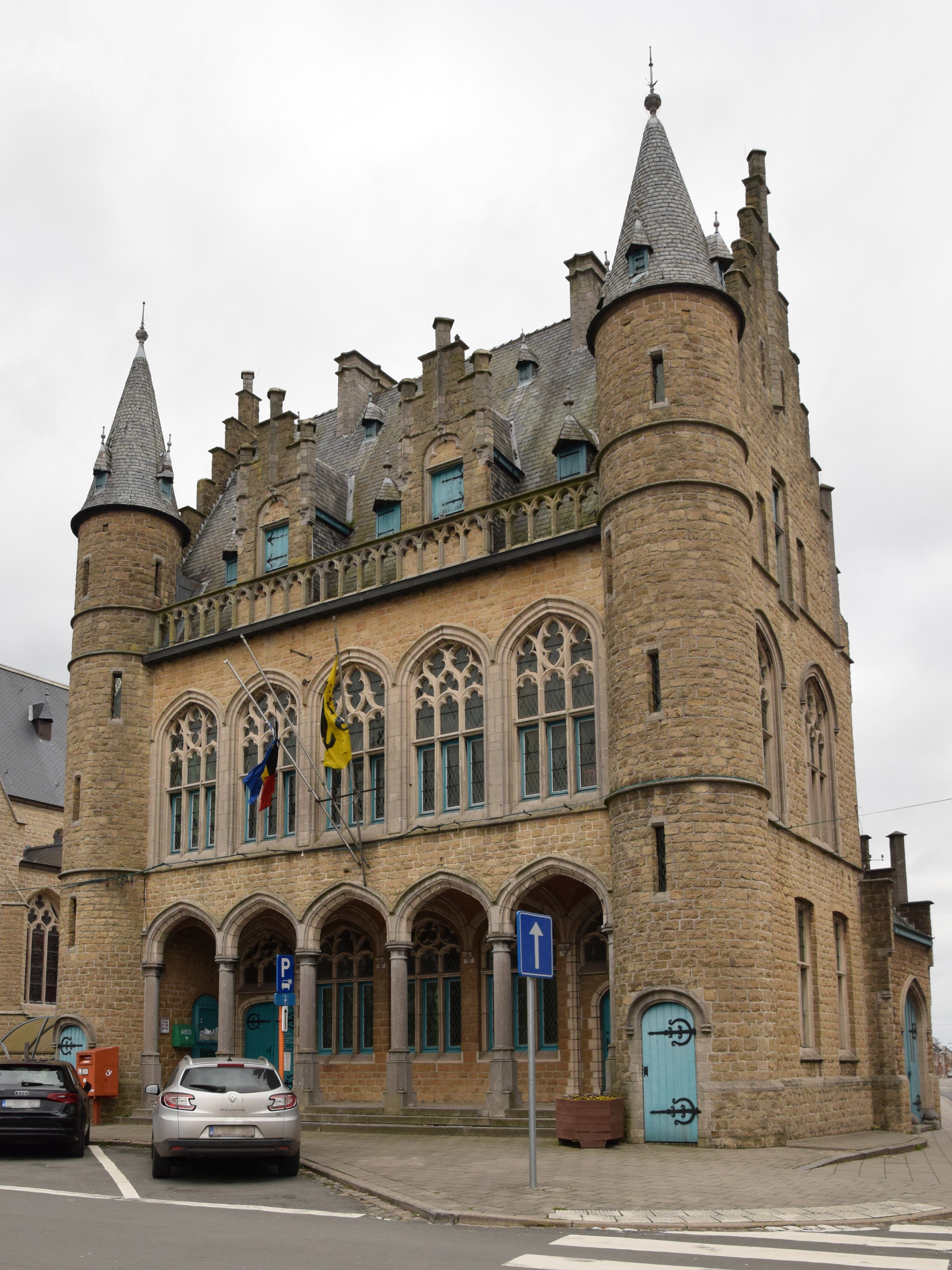
Former town hall

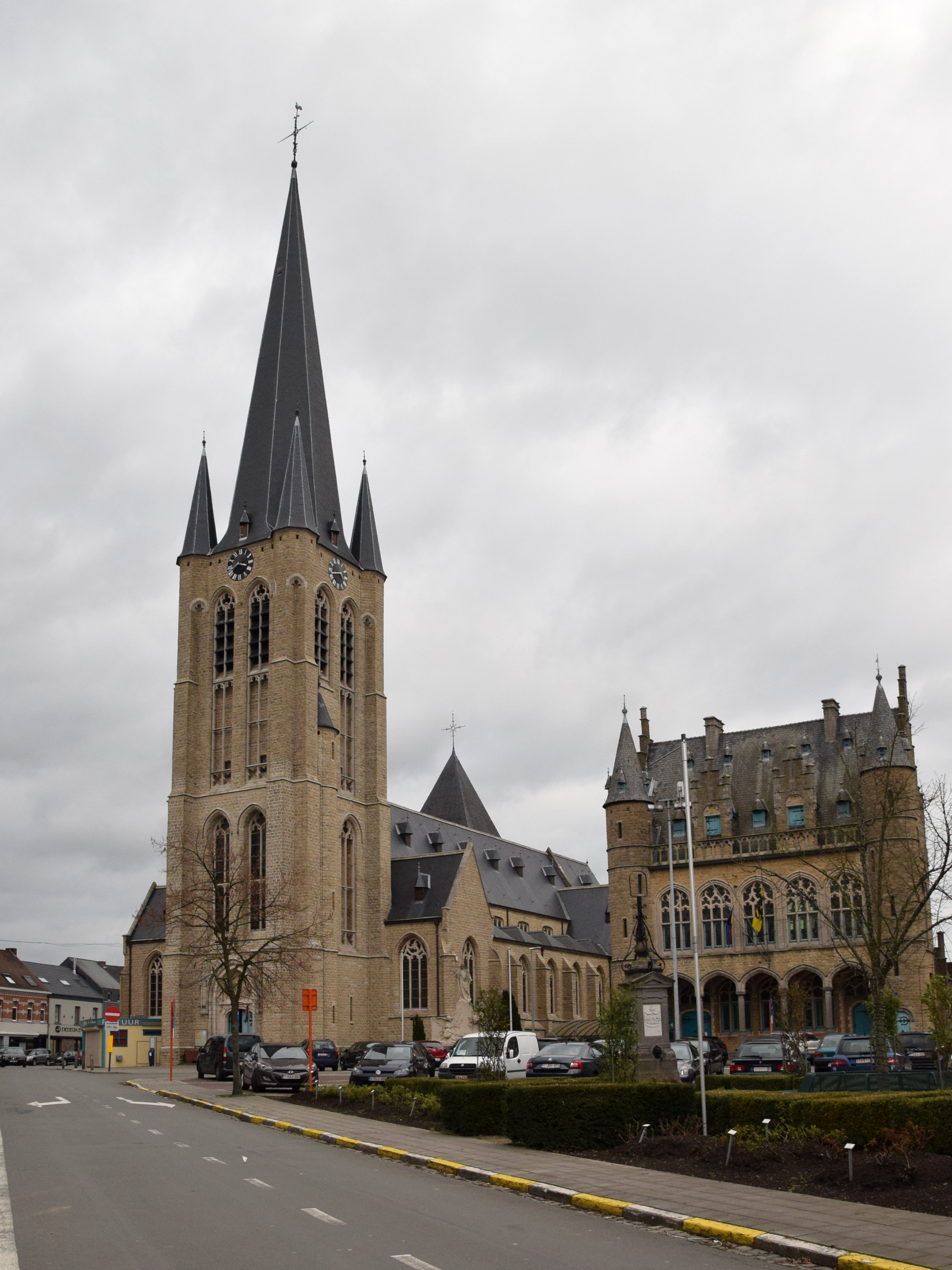
Our Lady Church

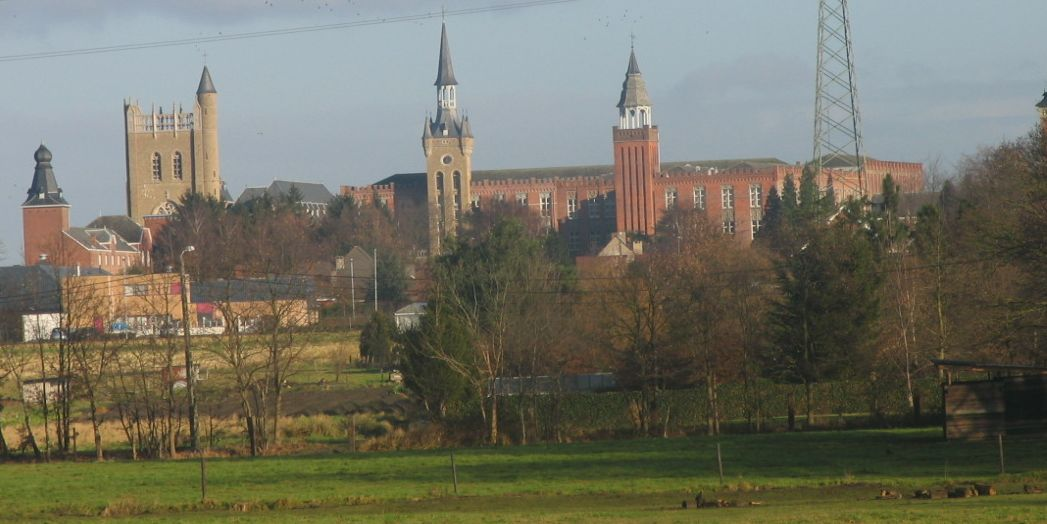
View on the towers
