= Boom, Belgium =

Boom
- Municipality
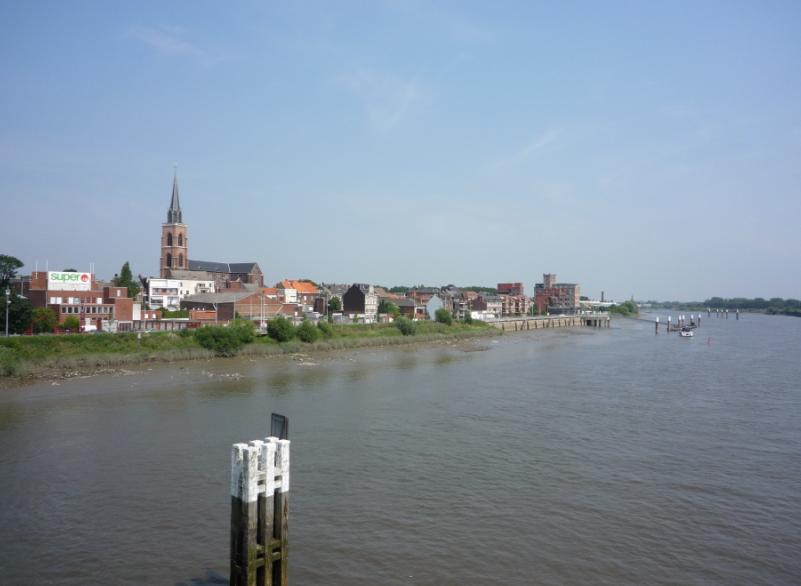

- Flag Coat of arms

- Location of Boom in the province of Antwerp
- Interactive map of Boom
- Location in Belgium
- Coordinates: 51°05′N 04°22′E
- Country: Belgium
- Community: Flemish Community
- Region: Flemish Region
- Province: Antwerp
- Arrondissement: Antwerp

Government
  - Mayor: Jeroen Baert (N-VA)
  - Governing parties: N-VA, CD&V, Green

Area
  - Total: 7.38 km^{2} (2.85 sq mi)

Population (2025-01-01)
  - Total: 19,699
  - Density: 2,670/km^{2} (6,910/sq mi)
- Postal codes: 2850
- NIS code: 11005
- Area codes: 03, 015
- Website: www.boom.be

Boom (/boʊm/ BOHM, Dutch: [boːm]) is a Belgian town, located in both the arrondissement and province of Antwerp. In 2021, Boom had a total population of 18,799. The total area is 7.37 km^{2} (2.85 sq mi). Residents are known as "Boomenaren".

Since 2005, Boom has hosted the annual electronic dance music event Tomorrowland.

== History ==
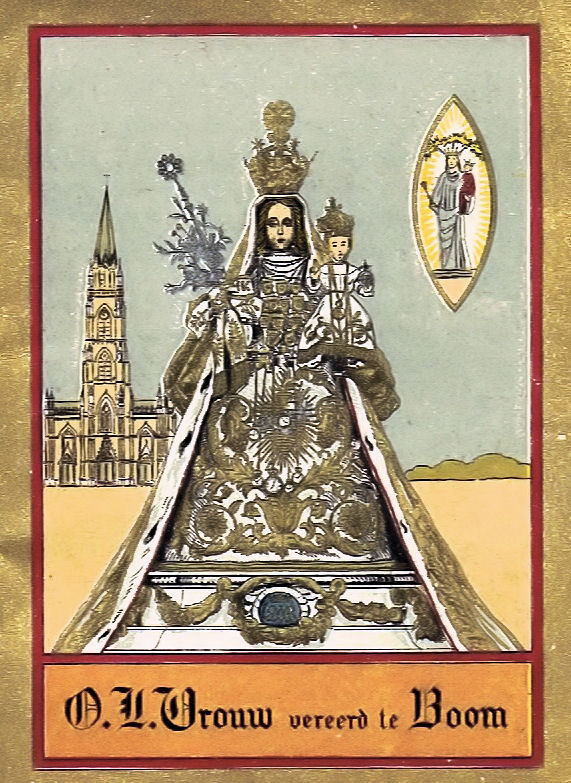
Our Lady of Boom, c. 1910

Recorded history of this community started in the late 1300s. A population boom in Boom occurred some time during the 19th century. In Boom, people venerate a statue of Our Lady of Boom.

== Geography ==
Boom is located between three big cities (Brussels, Antwerp and Ghent), and is situated along the Rupel river.

=== Climate ===
Boom has an oceanic climate (Köppen climate classification: Cfb).

Climate data for Boom (1991−2020 normals)
Month	Jan	Feb	Mar	Apr	May	Jun	Jul	Aug	Sep	Oct	Nov	Dec	Year
Mean daily maximum °C (°F)	6.7 (44.1)	7.6 (45.7)	11.2 (52.2)	15.4 (59.7)	19.0 (66.2)	21.8 (71.2)	23.8 (74.8)	23.7 (74.7)	20.1 (68.2)	15.4 (59.7)	10.4 (50.7)	7.1 (44.8)	15.2 (59.4)
Daily mean °C (°F)	4.0 (39.2)	4.4 (39.9)	7.1 (44.8)	10.4 (50.7)	14.1 (57.4)	17.0 (62.6)	19.0 (66.2)	18.7 (65.7)	15.5 (59.9)	11.5 (52.7)	7.4 (45.3)	4.5 (40.1)	11.2 (52.2)
Mean daily minimum °C (°F)	1.3 (34.3)	1.2 (34.2)	3.0 (37.4)	5.4 (41.7)	9.2 (48.6)	12.2 (54.0)	14.2 (57.6)	13.8 (56.8)	10.8 (51.4)	7.6 (45.7)	4.4 (39.9)	2.0 (35.6)	7.1 (44.8)
Average precipitation mm (inches)	71.2 (2.80)	61.7 (2.43)	54.5 (2.15)	41.8 (1.65)	58.0 (2.28)	70.6 (2.78)	79.7 (3.14)	84.8 (3.34)	70.5 (2.78)	67.8 (2.67)	78.2 (3.08)	87.7 (3.45)	826.6 (32.54)
Average precipitation days (≥ 1.0 mm)	12.6	11.7	10.5	8.9	10.1	10.2	10.6	10.8	10.1	11.1	12.9	13.9	133.2
Mean monthly sunshine hours	62	78	135	189	218	219	224	211	164	117	67	52	1,735
Source: Royal Meteorological Institute

== Economy ==
Because of the presence of clay around Boom, the region is well known for and has many clay pits and brick factories.

=== Schools ===
==== Elementary Schools ====
According to the website of the town, this is the current list of the "basisscholen" (Elementary Schools) in Boom directly.

- GO! Hoeksteen
- OLVI Reuzenboom
- OLVI De kade
- GO! 't Krekeltje
- GO! Villa Kakelbont
- GO! Boom park

==== Secondary Schools ====
According to the website from Boom, this is the list of the "secundaire scholen" (secondary schools - High School and Middle School) in Boom directly.

- PTS (owned in part by the Provence of Antwerp)
- OLVI Bovenbouw
- OLVI Middenschool
- GO! Atheneum Boom
- GO! Middenschool Den Brandt

== Notable people ==
- Egidius Aerts (1822–1853), flautist and composer
- Glen De Boeck (1971–2025), football player and coach.
- Peter Dens (1690–1775), Catholic theologian.
- Herbert Flack (1913–1995), actor.
- Romelu Lukaku (1993), football player.
- Bobbejaan Schoepen (1925–2010), singer-songwriter, guitarist and art whistler. He was also an actor, fantasist and founder of the Bobbejaanland amusement park in Belgium.
- Kevin Seeldraeyers (1986), cyclist.
- Jean-François van de Velde (1779–1838), 20th bishop of Ghent.
- Roland Van Campenhout (1944), musician.
- Jozef Van Lerius (1823–1876), painter.
- Frans Verschoren (1874–1951), writer.
- Bjorn Vleminckx (1986), football player.
- Charles Augustin Wauters (1808–1869), painter.

== Events ==
- Tomorrowland: EDM World-famous and largest Dance Music festival in the world, that almost 2 million people have attended since its 2005 launch. Next Tomorrowland is scheduled to be held in July 2026.
- Feria Andaluza: Spanish festival in De Schorre.

== Sports ==
- K. Rupel Boom F.C.: Football club, currently playing in the Belgian Third Division.
- Kangeroes Boom: Basketball club, currently playing in the second division.
- Braxgata: Hockey club, currently playing in the first division. Hockey club of the year by the European Hockey Federation (EHF) in 2009.
- Fudji Yama Boom-Niel-Schelle: Judo club, founded in 1958
- Cyclo-cross Boom, an annual day of cyclocross races

== Movies ==
The movie La Kermesse héroïque (Carnival in Flanders) directed by Jacques Feyder in 1935 takes place in the town of Boom.
