= Edegem =

- Municipality
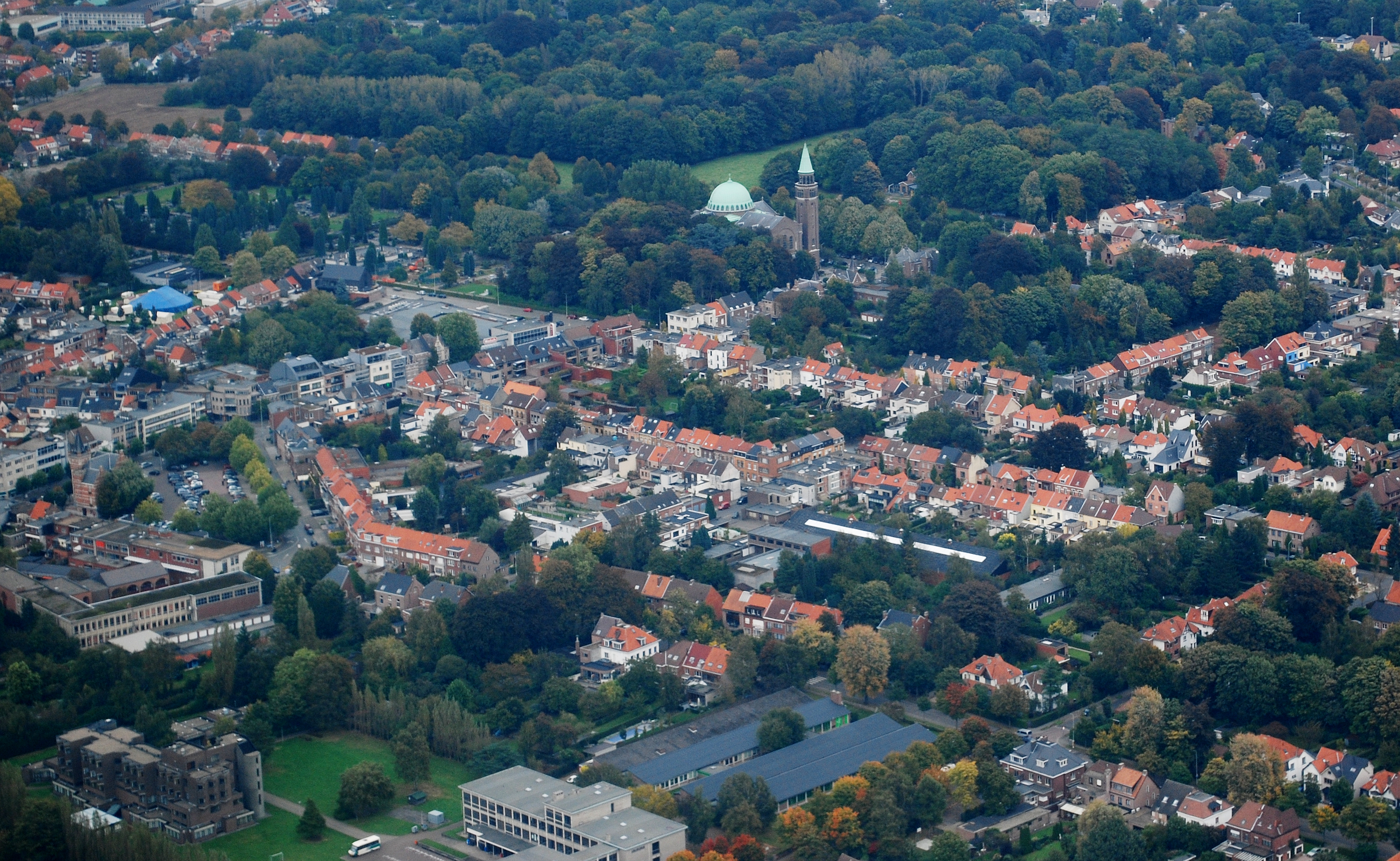

- Flag Coat of arms

- Location of Edegem in the province of Antwerp
- Interactive map of Edegem
- Location in Belgium
- Coordinates: 51°09′N 04°27′E
- Country: Belgium
- Community: Flemish Community
- Region: Flemish Region
- Province: Antwerp
- Arrondissement: Antwerp

Government
  - Mayor: Koen Metsu (N-VA)
  - Governing party: N-VA

Area
  - Total: 8.72 km^{2} (3.37 sq mi)

Population (2020-01-01)
  - Total: 22,261
  - Density: 2,550/km^{2} (6,610/sq mi)
- Postal codes: 2650
- NIS code: 11013
- Area codes: 03
- Website: www.edegem.be

Edegem (Dutch pronunciation: [ˈeːdəɣɛm], first mentioned as Buizegem in 1173) is a municipality located in the Belgian province of Antwerp. The municipality only comprises the town of Edegem proper. In 2021, Edegem had a total population of 22,244. The total area is 8.65 km^{2} (3.34 sq mi). The old Sint-Antoniuskerk (church of Saint Anthony) is no longer open to the public. It is not sure when it was first built (some sources go back as far as the 16th century).

The absence of heavy industry makes Edegem a typical commuter town. Despite its location next to the metropolis of the city of Antwerp, Edegem is not fully urbanized.

== Notable buildings and landmarks ==
- Sint-Antoniuskerk (Church of Saint Anthony)

The Sint-Antoniuskerk is a gothic church that was built between the 16th and 17th century.

- The Basilica of Our Lady of Lourdes

In 1884 a cave was built, after the cave present at the site of Our Lady of Lourdes, as a pilgrimage site. It became a very popular place of worship when truckloads of Christians came to visit the site.

When the population of Edegem grew in the beginning of the 20th century the Sint-Antoniuskerk in the center of town became too small. Thus plans were made to build an expansion. But when World War I broke out in 1914, the expansion was delayed. Afterwards the city council and the local religious institutions decided to build a new place of worship near the site of the Cave of Our Lady of Lourdes due to the large number of pilgrims visiting the site. The church was designed by architect Louis De Vooght to be a neo-Byzantine basilique. Construction began in September 1931 and ended in the first half of 1933.

In 2008, Pope Benedict XVI gave the Basilica of Edegem the official status of basilica minor.

- Kasteel Hof Ter Linden

Kasteel Hof Ter Linden is a Neoclassical villa in Edegem. Its origins can be traced back to the early 15th century. In 1587–88 the estate was destroyed by Irish soldiers, reconstruction began in 1607. In 1725 it became a Hof van Plaisantie (Court of Pleasures) and in 1770–1773 the current Neoclassical facade was built. An impressive alley of Lindentrees, planted in 1756, connects the castle with the Sint-Anoniuskerk.

In the 20th century the castle was inhabited by Baron and Baroness de Roest d'Alkmade.

== Notable people ==
- Marie Gevers, novelist, born at Edegem, on 30 December 1883.
- Leo Tindemans, former prime minister of Belgium, diplomat, professor and chairman of the European People's Party (EPP).
- Willy Vandersteen, creator of comic books (Spike and Suzy, Willy and Wanda,...), died 28 August 1990.
- François-Xavier de Donnea, former Belgian defence minister, mayor of the City of Brussels, born at Edegem, on 29 April 1941.
- Christine Van Broeckhoven, molecular biologist and professor in Molecular genetics.
- Ilse Heylen, judoka and bronze medal winner at the 2004 Summer Olympics in Athens, Greece.
- Hendrik Vervliet, historian
- Boris Daenen (Netsky), drum and bass DJ
- Jean Bourgain (1954-2018), mathematician and Fields Medal winner.

== Recreation facilities ==
- Fort 5 is a fort in the community of Edegem. It was built between 1859–1864.

It is a compound of the Brialmontgordel or the National Redoubt, a series of forts built around the city of Antwerp as a defence against foreign armies. During the Franco–Prussian war of 1870 it became clear that, due to innovations in the weapons industry, German artillery was able to bombard the city of Paris from a distance as close as 7 km. So only four years after the construction of Fort 5 it became almost useless in the plan for the defence of Antwerp. In the 19th century the Brialmontgordel functioned as a prototype for the defense of large European cities. Today Fort 5 is open to the public and it functions as a recreational domain. It also houses all sorts of local organisations.

- Het Meihof is a playground in the community of Edegem.

The local authorities have made a recreational playground. In the playground there is a forest, a large skatepark, a basketball court and three bowls areas. There is also a restaurant with a terrace where they serve simple meals, and a bar. The old building was completely restored. All the toys in the playground were renewed. Now there is also a water playground and an adventure playground.

== Gallery ==
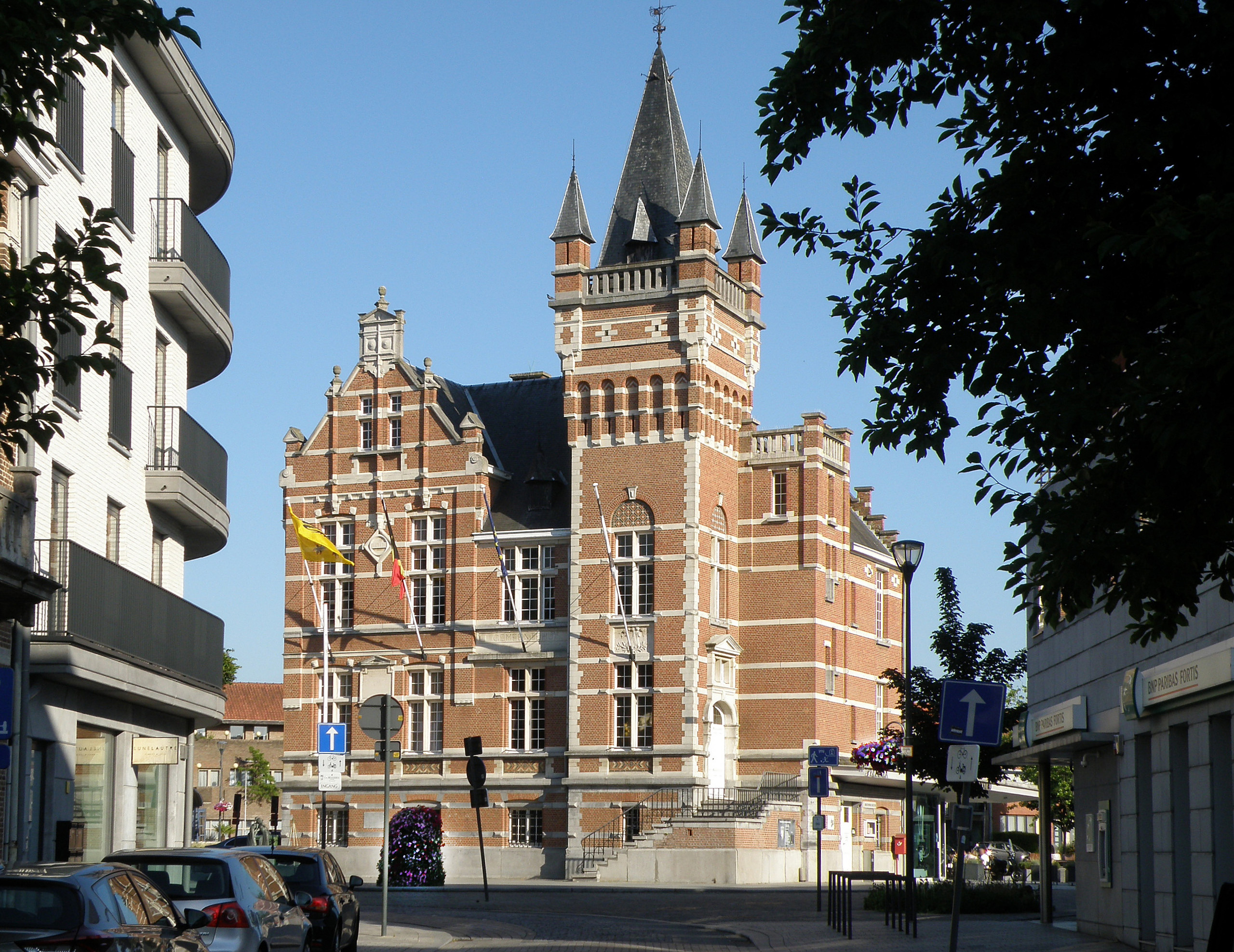
Former town hall (1911)

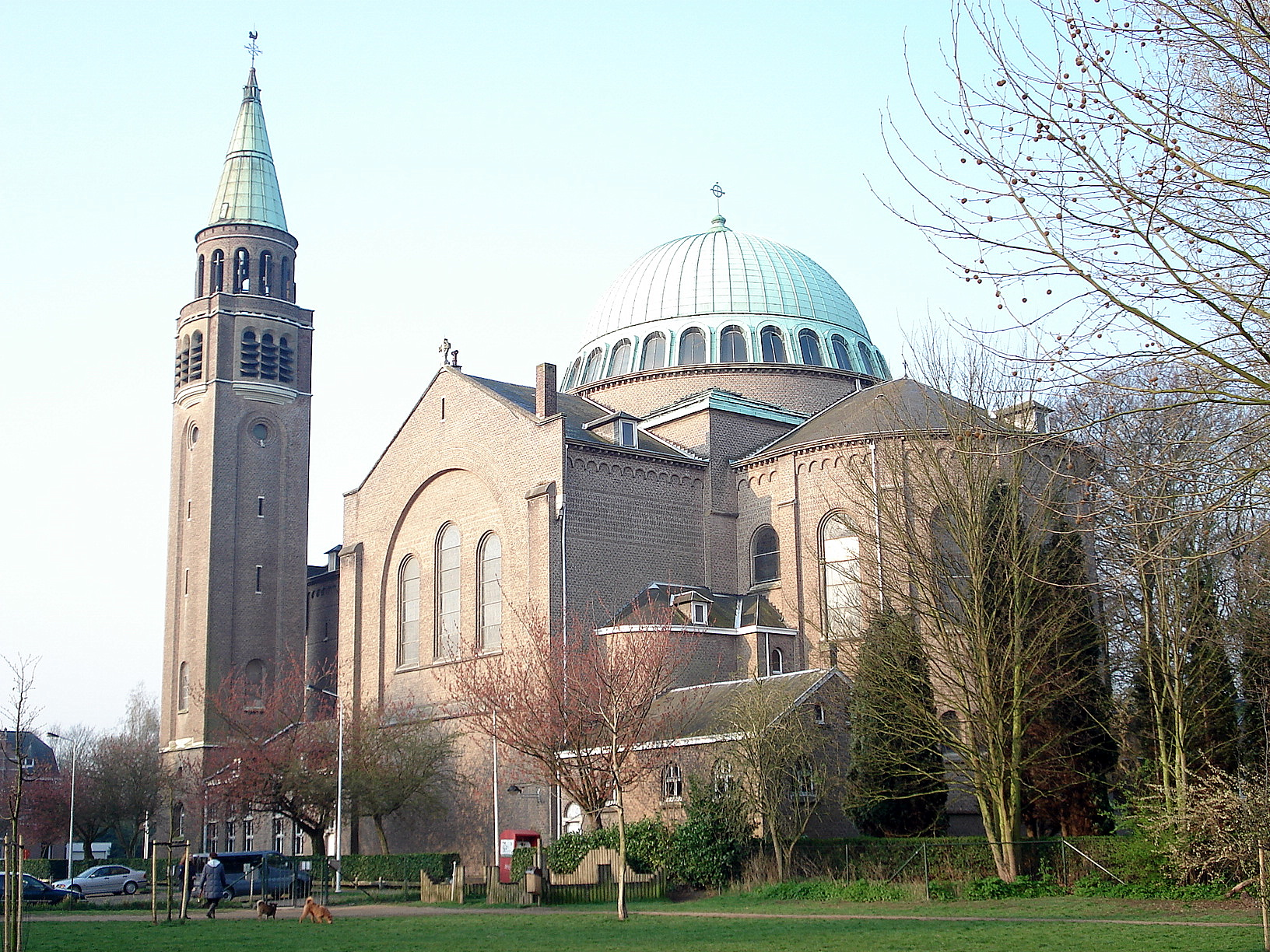
Our Lady of Lourdes Church

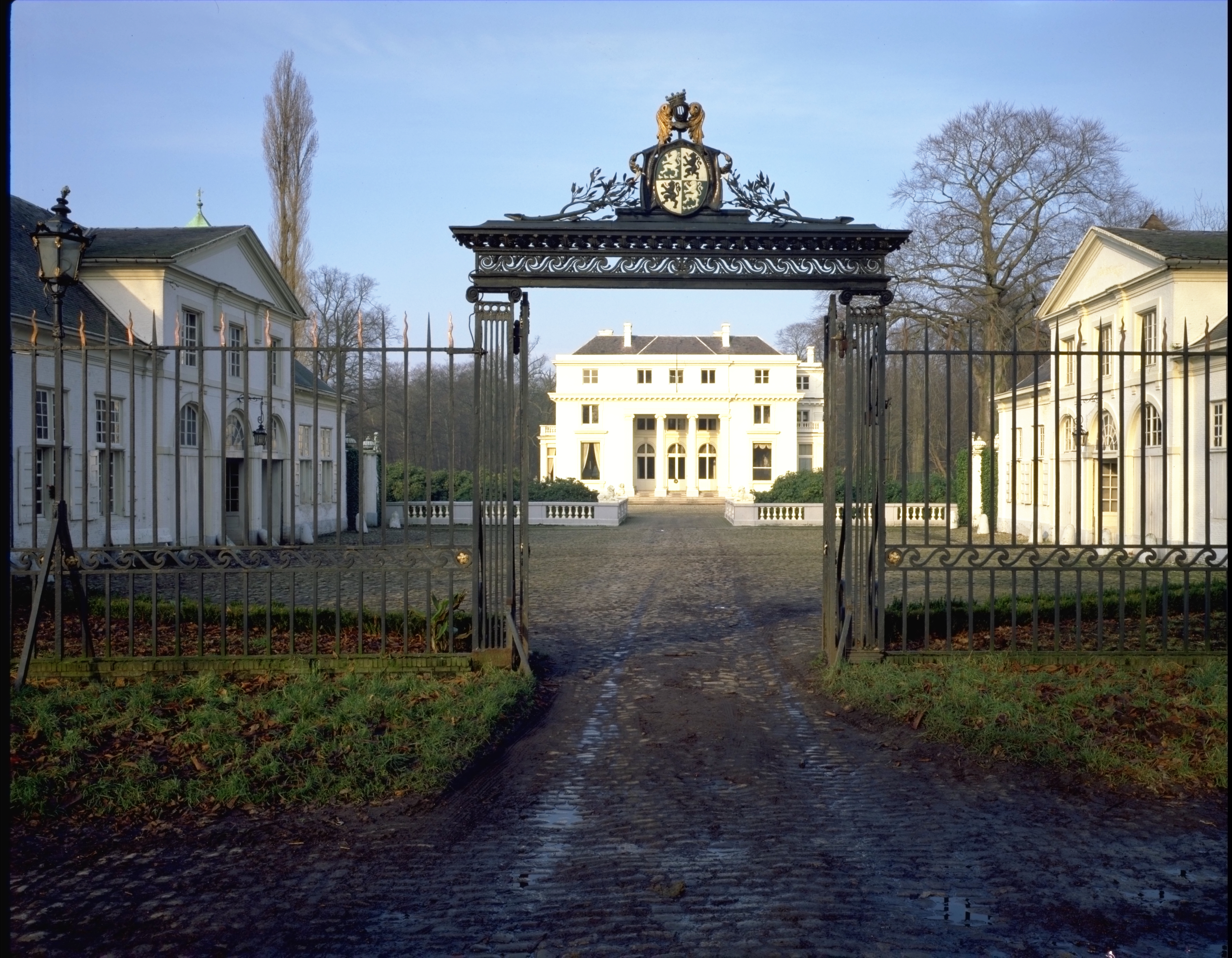
Castle Hof ter Linden

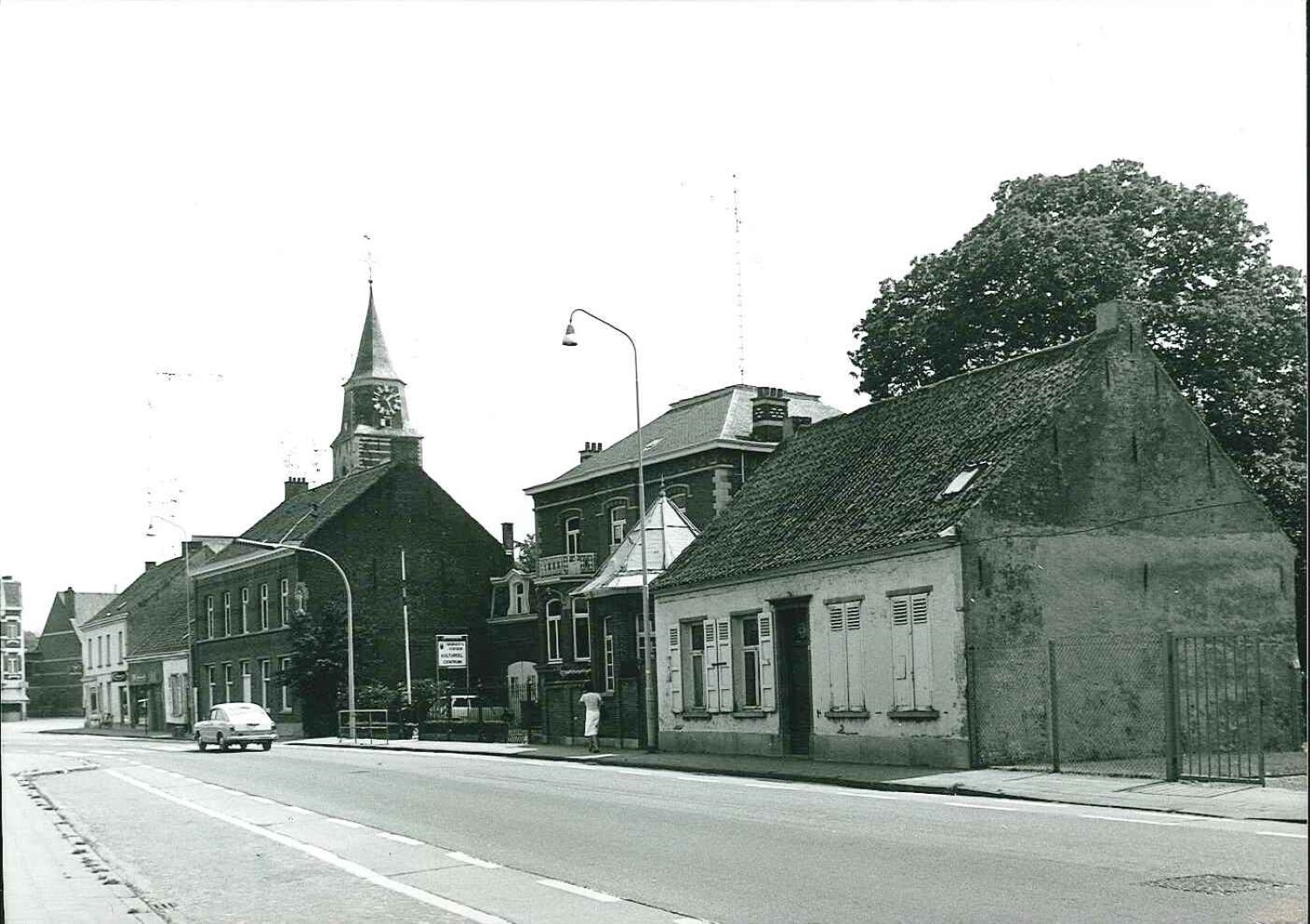
Street view (1978)

== Climate ==
Climate data for Edegem (1991−2020 normals)
Month	Jan	Feb	Mar	Apr	May	Jun	Jul	Aug	Sep	Oct	Nov	Dec	Year
Mean daily maximum °C (°F)	6.6 (43.9)	7.6 (45.7)	11.1 (52.0)	15.3 (59.5)	18.9 (66.0)	21.6 (70.9)	23.7 (74.7)	23.5 (74.3)	20.0 (68.0)	15.3 (59.5)	10.3 (50.5)	7.0 (44.6)	15.1 (59.2)
Daily mean °C (°F)	3.9 (39.0)	4.3 (39.7)	6.9 (44.4)	10.2 (50.4)	14.0 (57.2)	16.9 (62.4)	18.9 (66.0)	18.6 (65.5)	15.3 (59.5)	11.3 (52.3)	7.2 (45.0)	4.4 (39.9)	11.0 (51.8)
Mean daily minimum °C (°F)	1.2 (34.2)	1.0 (33.8)	2.8 (37.0)	5.1 (41.2)	9.1 (48.4)	12.1 (53.8)	14.2 (57.6)	13.7 (56.7)	10.7 (51.3)	7.4 (45.3)	4.2 (39.6)	1.8 (35.2)	7.0 (44.6)
Average precipitation mm (inches)	68.1 (2.68)	59.8 (2.35)	53.7 (2.11)	41.1 (1.62)	57.5 (2.26)	72.2 (2.84)	78.3 (3.08)	83.6 (3.29)	69.9 (2.75)	66.1 (2.60)	75.6 (2.98)	87.7 (3.45)	813.5 (32.03)
Average precipitation days (≥ 1.0 mm)	12.1	11.0	10.1	8.5	9.5	10.0	10.2	10.5	9.7	10.7	12.3	13.5	128.0
Mean monthly sunshine hours	60	77	135	190	219	220	225	212	164	116	66	51	1,733
Source: Royal Meteorological Institute
