= Peter Dens =

Belgian theologian

Peter Dens (12 September 1690 – 15 February 1775) was a Flemish Roman Catholic theologian.

== Biography ==
Dens was born at Boom near Antwerp. Most of his life was spent in the archiepiscopal college of Mechelen, where he was for twelve years reader in theology and for forty president. His great work was the Theologia moralis et dogmatica, a compendium in catechetical form of Roman Catholic doctrine and ethics which has been much used as a students textbook.
