= Egidius Aerts =

Egidius Aerts (1822–1853) was a Belgian flautist and composer.

He was born in Boom, United Kingdom of the Netherlands. He studied under Jean François Joseph Lahon (1798-1847) in the Brussels Conservatory. From 1837 to 1840 he travelled professionally through France and Italy, and on his return to Brussels studied composition under François-Joseph Fétis. In 1847 was appointed professor of the flute at the Conservatory, and first flute at the Theatre. He died at Brussels in 1853.

He composed symphonies and overtures, as well as concertos and other music for the flute.
