= Fort 5 Edegem =

Fort 5
- Part of Brialmont fortifications of Antwerp
- Edegem, Belgium

Site information
- Controlled by: Municipality of Edegem
- Open to the public: Yes
- Condition: Preserved

Location
- Coordinates: 51.16828°N 4.43327°E

Site history
- Built: 1859–1864
- Built by: Kingdom of Belgium
- In use: 1864–1945
- Materials: Brick, earth, concrete

Fort 5 is a polygonal fortress located in Edegem, a municipality in the province of Antwerp, Belgium. It was built between 1859 and 1864 as part of the Brialmont fortifications, a defensive ring around the city of Antwerp designed by the military engineer Henri Alexis Brialmont. Today, Fort 5 serves as a municipal park, nature reserve, and cultural venue.

== History ==
=== Construction ===
Fort 5 was one of the first eight forts constructed in a 19th-century defensive ring to protect Antwerp, designated as the "National Redoubt" of Belgium. The fort was designed in a typical polygonal style with thick earthen ramparts, moats, and caponiers for flanking fire. It was intended to withstand siege warfare using mid-19th century artillery technology.

According to the Fortengordels heritage project, the fort's structure included a dry moat, underground galleries, and barracks designed for around 300 soldiers, with integrated artillery casemates.

=== First World War ===
During the Siege of Antwerp (1914), Fort 5 was heavily bombarded by German artillery on 8 October 1914. It was subsequently captured and used by German forces as a site of execution. A number of civilians and suspected resistance members were shot at the fort during the occupation. A memorial at the fort now commemorates the 16 people executed there.

=== Second World War ===
In World War II, Fort 5 was again used by German occupying forces, primarily as a storage facility. It did not play a significant defensive role during this conflict.

== Restoration ==
Since being acquired by the municipality of Edegem in 1977, Fort 5 has undergone various adaptive reuses. It now hosts cultural organizations, a fencing club, a social economy project, and coworking spaces such as "Bolwerk".

The former military hangars on the site have been partially restored, most notably Hangar 23, which received a restoration grant of €478,367 from the Flemish heritage agency. This hangar houses a bioclassroom, municipal storage, and spaces for educational use while maintaining conditions suitable for bat conservation.

== Ecology and Public Use ==
Fort 5 is protected as a European habitat for bats and is part of a designated nature zone. The extensive underground galleries serve as a refuge for several bat species including Daubenton's bat and Bechstein's bat. Public evening bat walks are organized each August.

A nature trail and cycling route connect Fort 5 to the adjacent Hof ter Linden estate and the Brialmont cycling network. The glacis (sloped earth embankments) hosts an outdoor play area, and guided heritage tours are offered by local cultural organizations.

== Notoriety ==
Fort 5 is historically notable for its use as an execution site during the First World War. The memorial on site is a recognized location of wartime remembrance. At least 16 Belgian civilians and suspected resistance members were executed there during the German occupation.

== See also ==
- National Redoubt (Belgium)
- Siege of Antwerp (1914)
- Edegem
