= Sint-Katelijne-Waver =

- Municipality
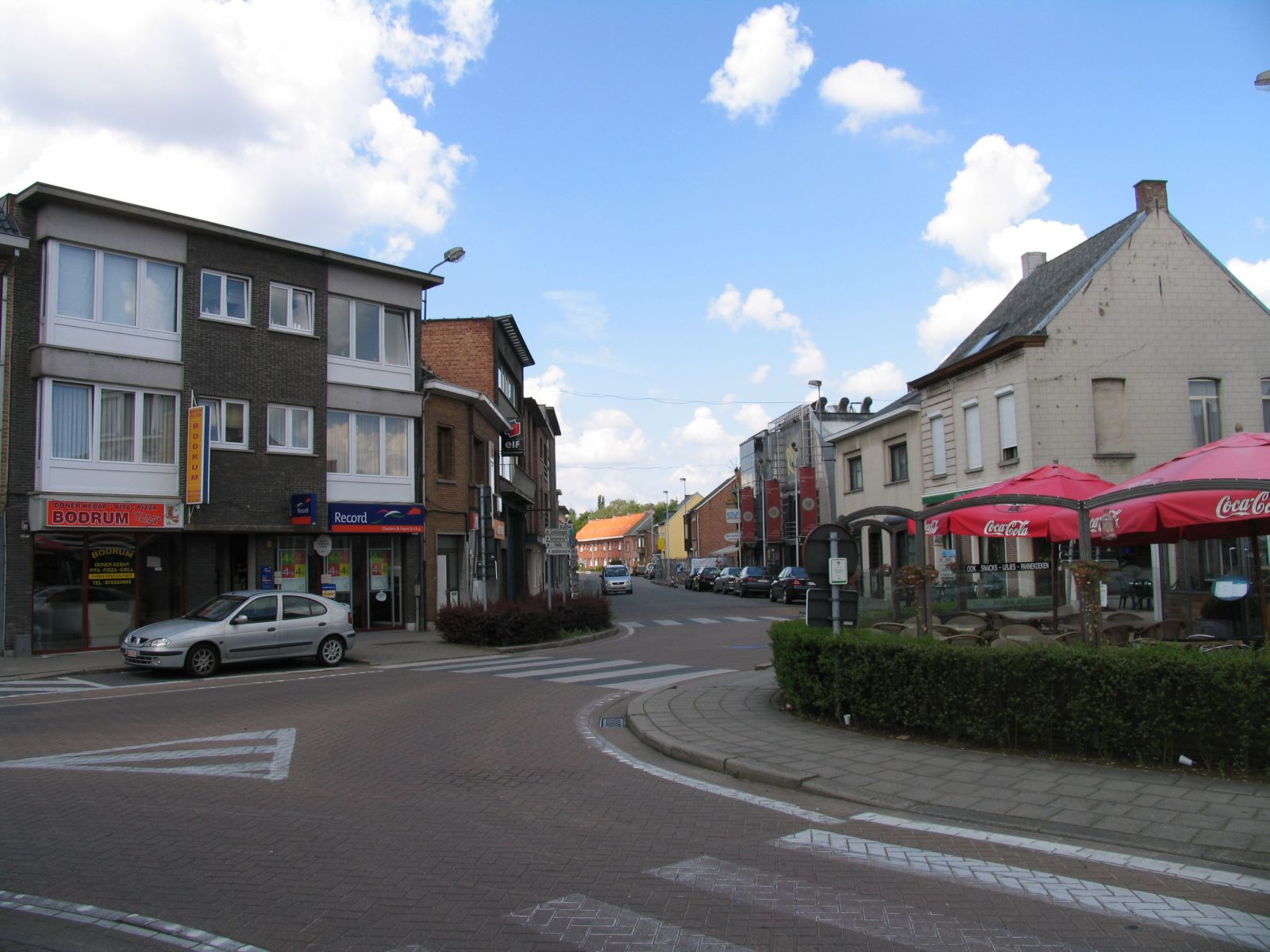

- Flag Coat of arms

- Location of Sint-Katelijne-Waver in the province of Antwerp
- Interactive map of Sint-Katelijne-Waver
- Location in Belgium
- Coordinates: 51°04′N 04°32′E
- Country: Belgium
- Community: Flemish Community
- Region: Flemish Region
- Province: Antwerp
- Arrondissement: Mechelen

Government
  - Mayor: Ronny Slootmans (Samen Anders)
  - Governing parties: Samen Anders, CD&V

Area
  - Total: 36.16 km^{2} (13.96 sq mi)

Population (2018-01-01)
  - Total: 20,870
  - Density: 577.2/km^{2} (1,495/sq mi)
- Postal codes: 2860, 2861
- NIS code: 12035
- Area codes: 015, 03
- Website: www.sint-katelijne-waver.be

Sint-Katelijne-Waver (Dutch pronunciation: [sɪnt kaːtəˌlɛinə ˈʋaːvər], old spelling: Kathelijne-Waver; French: Wavre-Sainte-Catherine, French pronunciation: [wavʁ sɛ̃t katʁin]) is a municipality located in the Belgian province of Antwerp. The municipality comprises the towns of Onze-Lieve-Vrouw-Waver and Sint-Katelijne-Waver proper. In 2021, Sint-Katelijne-Waver had a total population of 21,197. The total area is 36.12 km^{2}. Roosendael, a ruined relic of a cistercian abbey is situated here and today hosts a youth and touristic centre with pleasant walkways.

== Economic activities ==
Sint-Katelijne-Waver is a centre for market gardening and has many greenhouses. The Mechelse Veilingen in Sint-Katelijne-Waver is the largest co-operative vegetable auction in Europe.

== Pictures ==
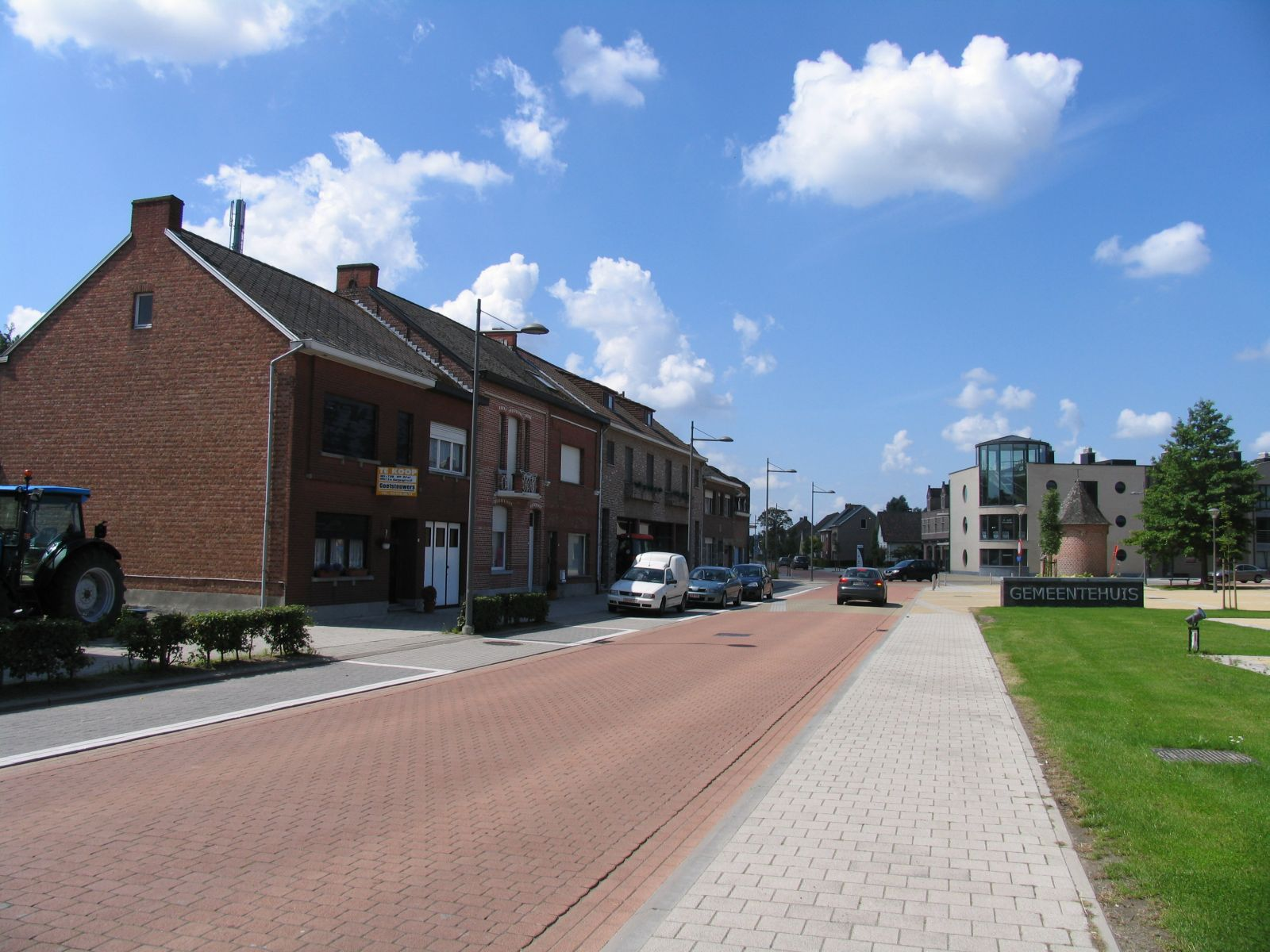
Leliestraat

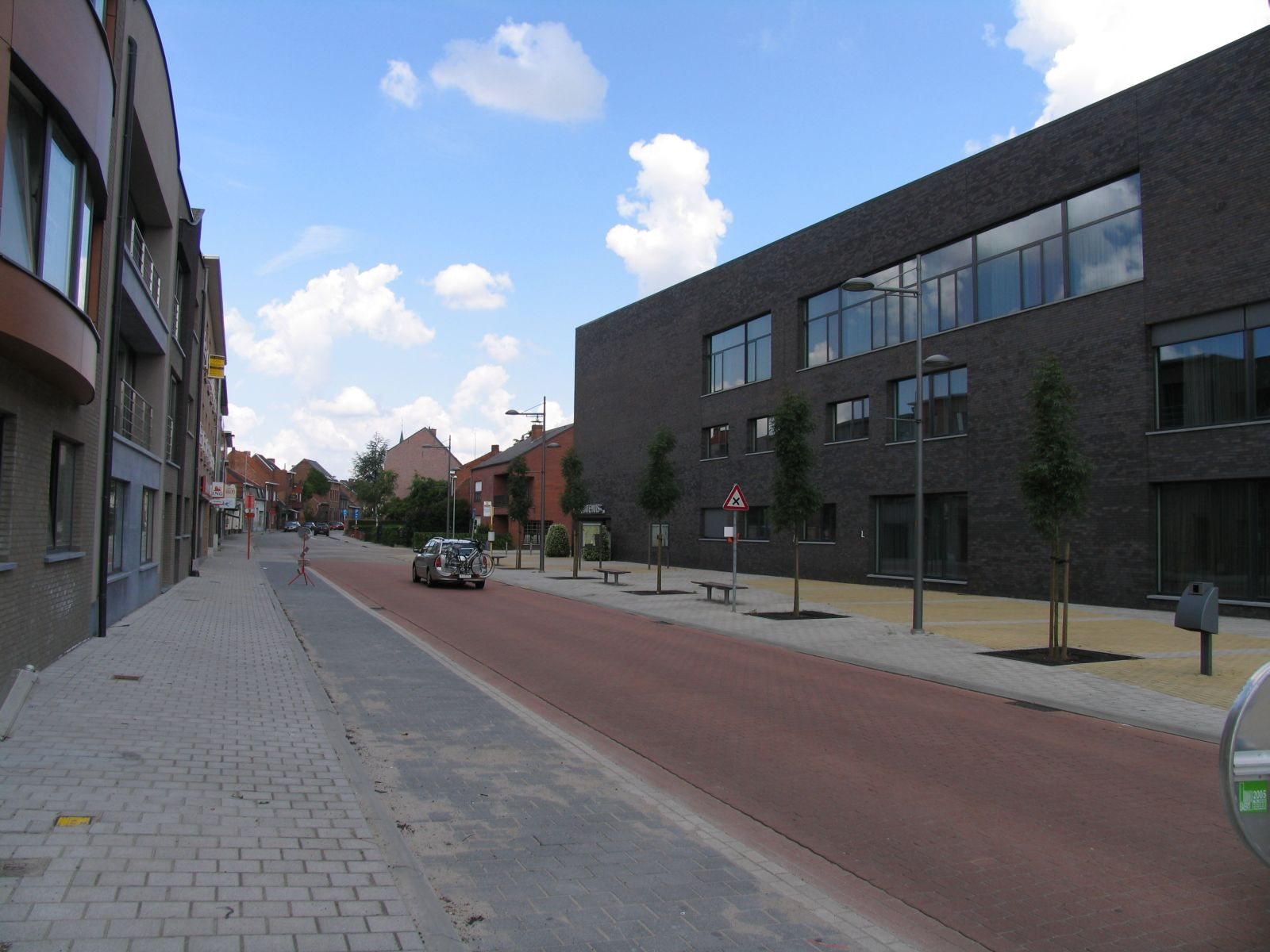
Town hall

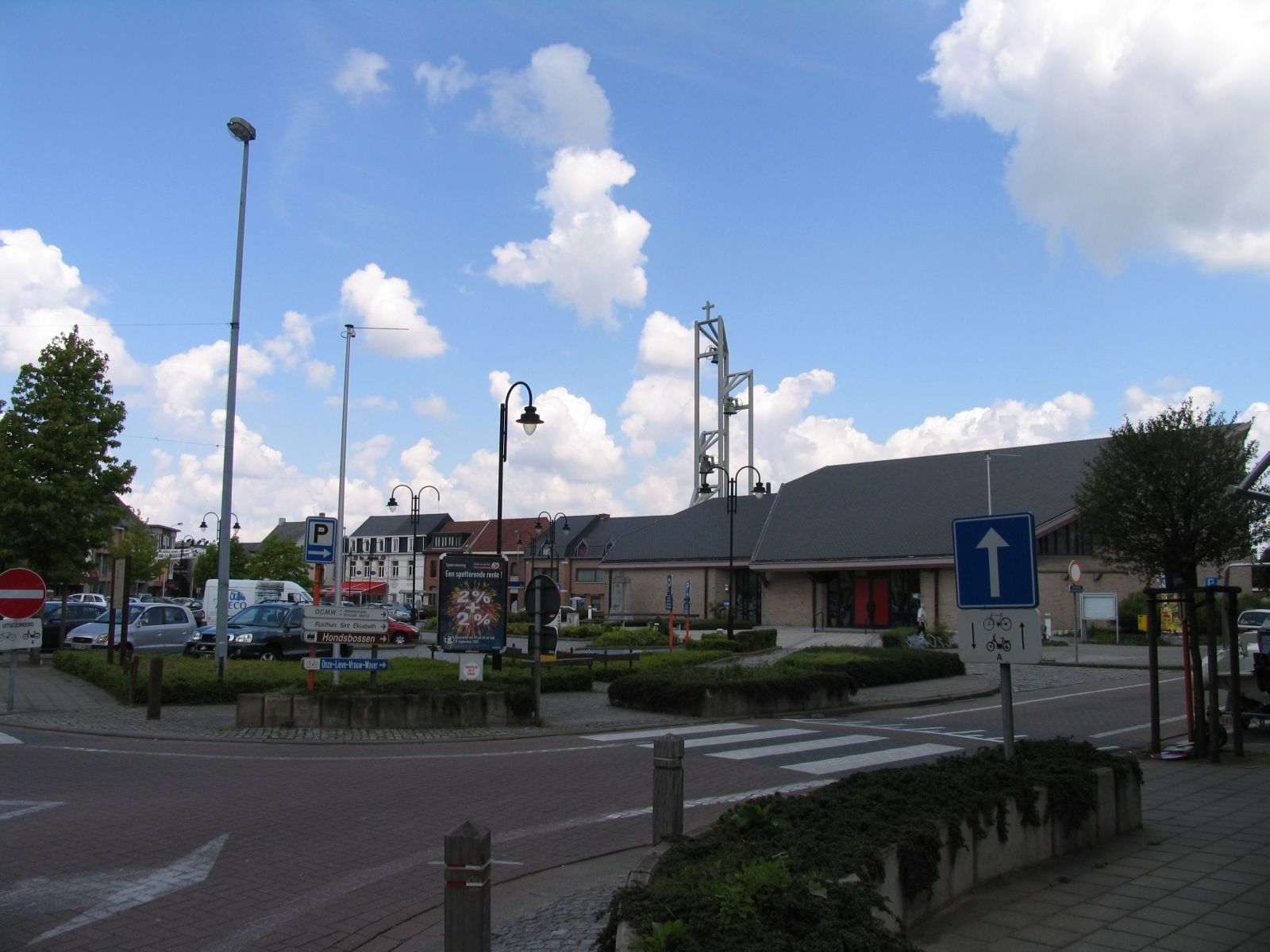
Church

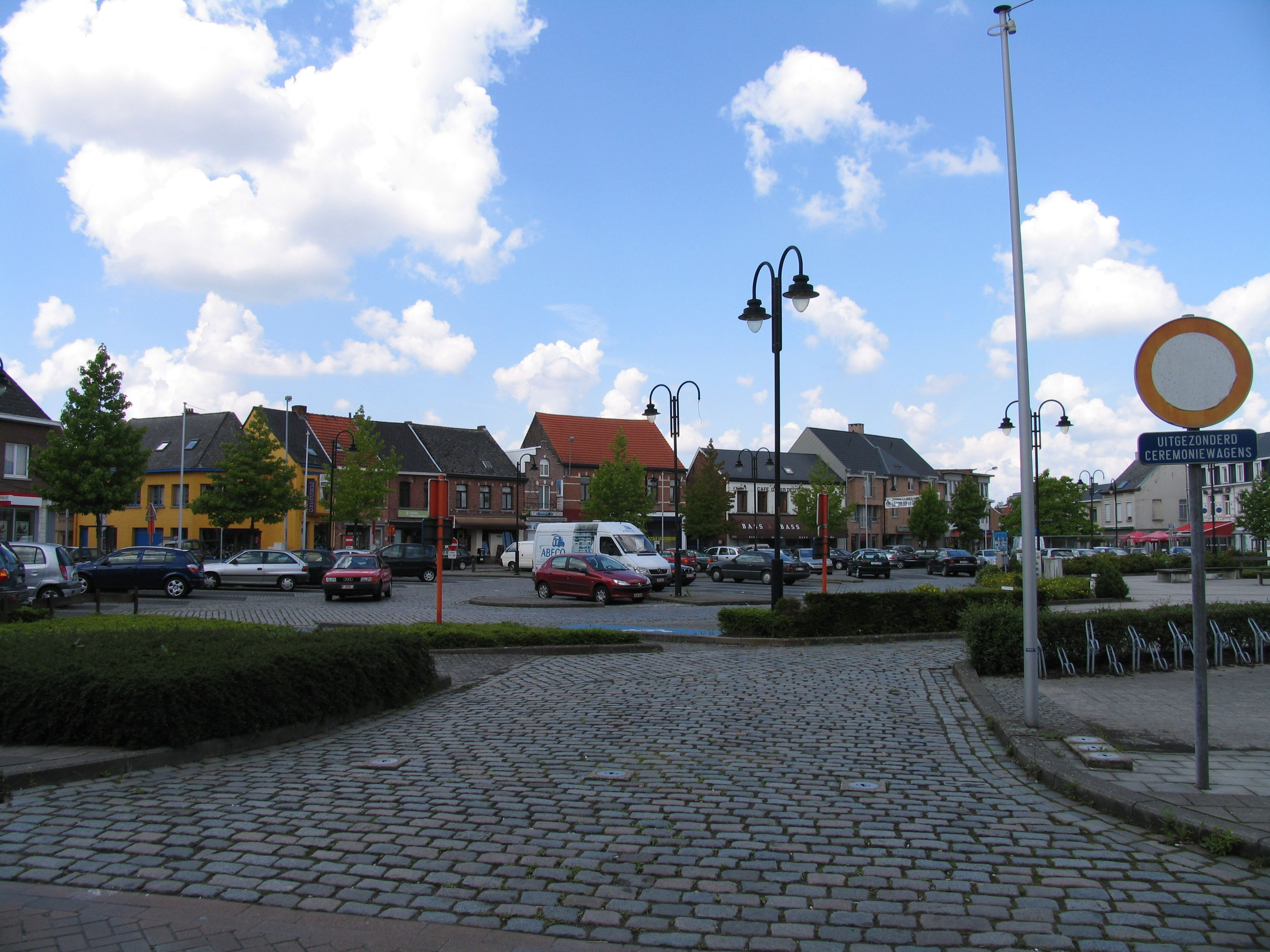
Town centre

== Twin towns ==
- Iernut (Romania), since 2001

== Notable people ==
- Jef Andries, footballer (1919–2006)
- Louis Budts, racing cyclist (1890–1977)
- Alois De Hertog, racing cyclist (1927–1993)
- Jean Dockx, footballer (1941–2002)
- Herman Portocarero, writer and diplomat (b. 1952)
- Frans Verschoren, writer (1874–1951)
