= Charles Augustin Wauters =

Belgian painter

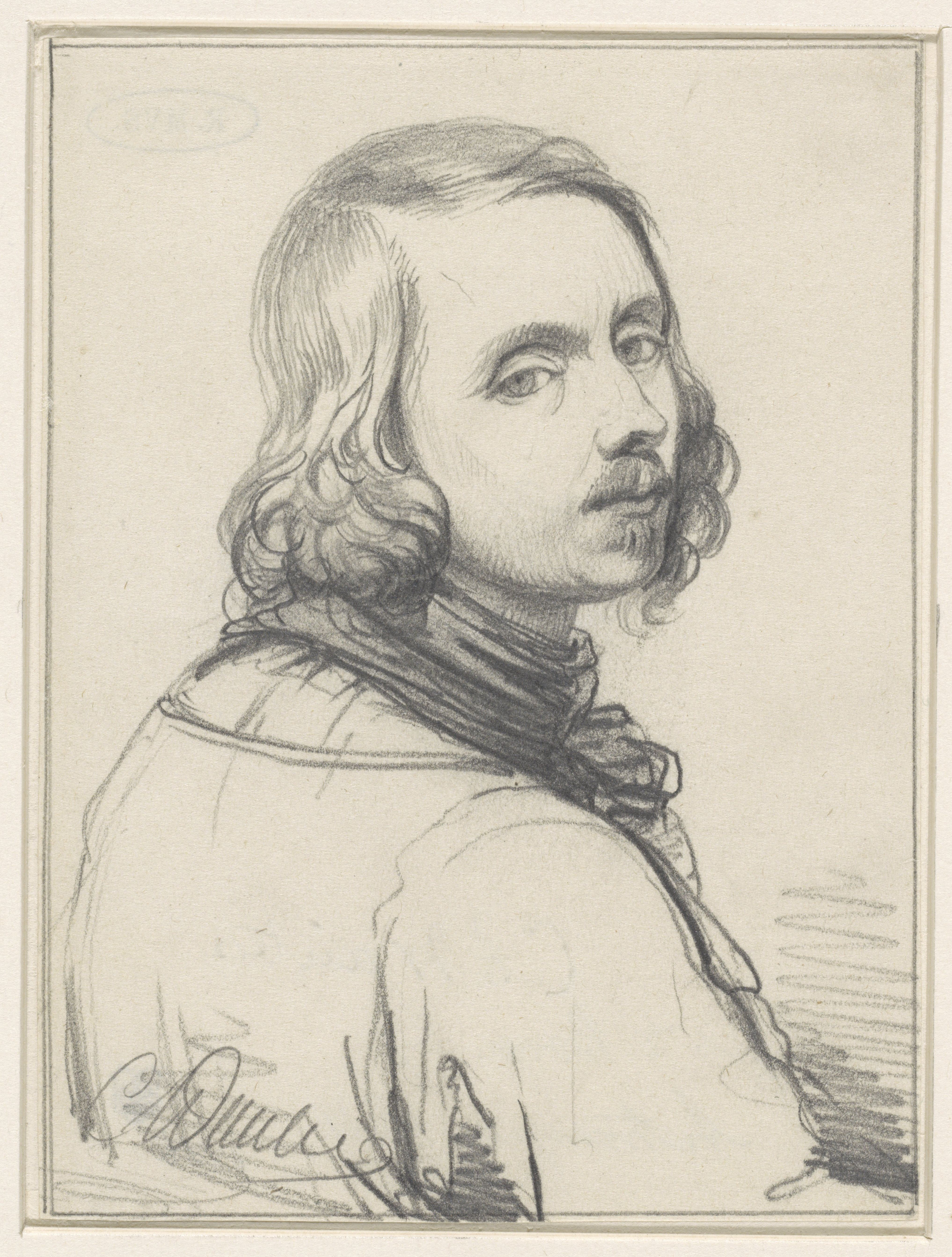
- Self-portrait
- Born: Charles Augustin Wauters; 23 April 1808; Boom, First French Empire
- Died: 4 November 1869 (aged 61); Mechelen, Belgium
- Education: Academy of Mechelen; Academy of Antwerp
- Occupation: Painter

Charles Augustin Wauters (23 April 1808, Boom – 4 November 1869, Mechelen) was a Belgian painter and engraver.

He was born in Boom, Antwerp, on 21 April 1808 or 23 April 1811. According to Marc. Eemans he was born in 1809. Wauters painted both genre scenes and religious subjects. He was also an engraver. He studied at the academies of Mechelen (where he later became director) and Antwerp, and also under Philippe-Jacques van Bree. A monument in his honour was unveiled at the St. Andrew's Church in Antwerp. He died in Mechelen on 4 November 1869.

== Gallery ==
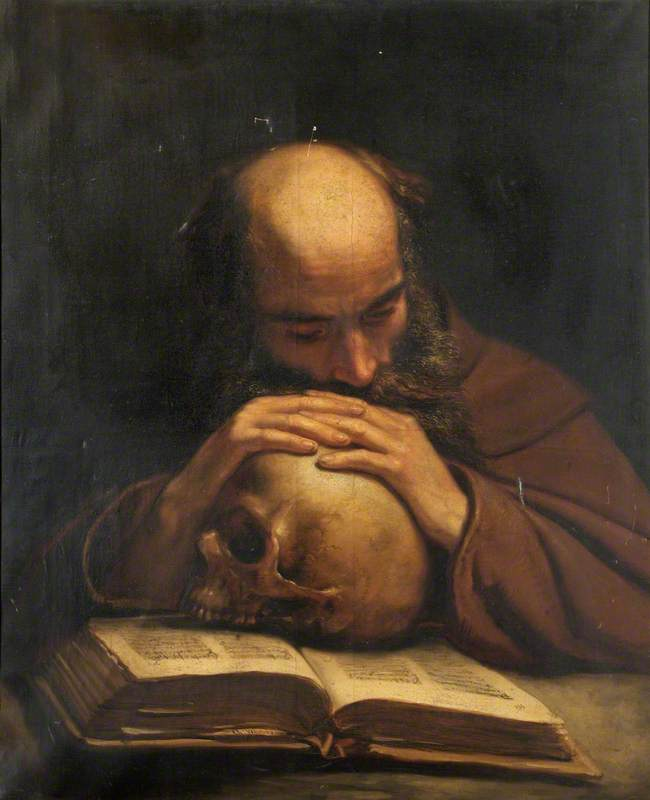
Franciscan Monk in Contemplation of the Bible, oil on canvas, 1852

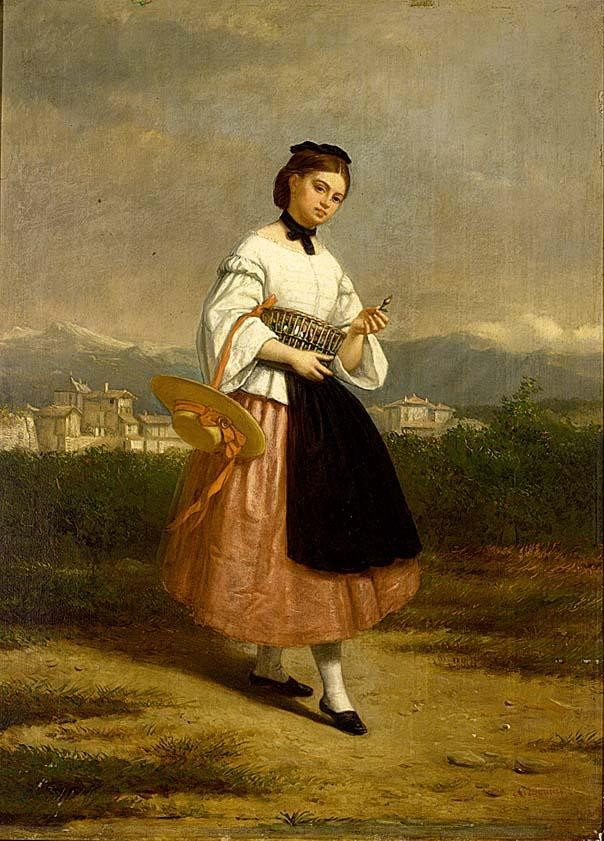
Girl in an Italian dress, oil on panel

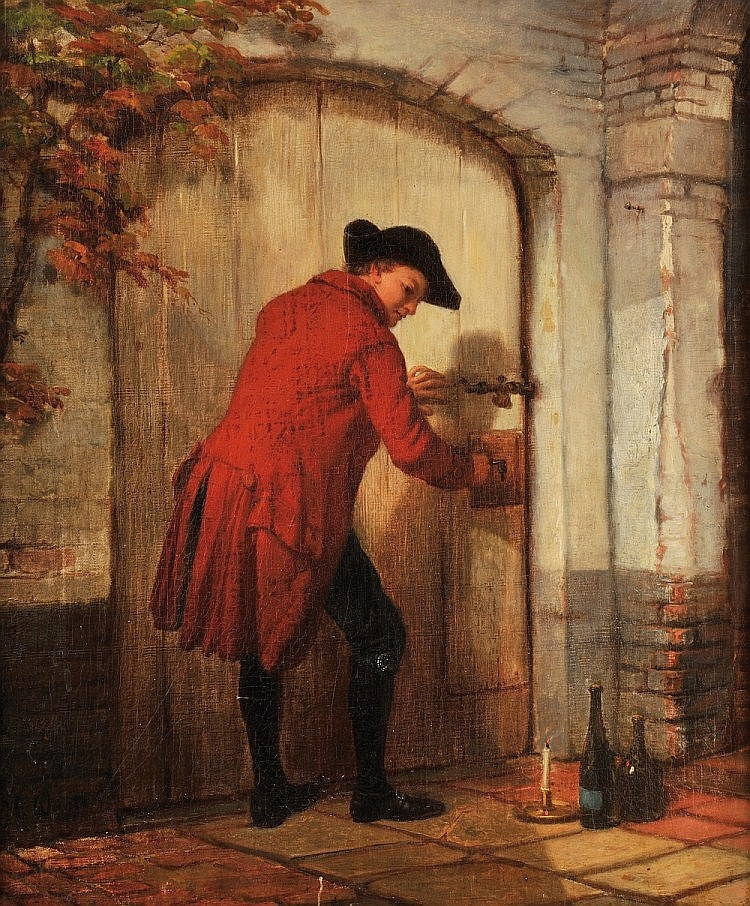
The secret passage, oil on canvas
