= Frans Verschoren =

- Frans Verschoren
- Born: 5 March 1874; Sint-Katelijne-Waver, Antwerp, Belgium
- Died: 5 December 1951 (aged 77); Westmalle, Antwerp, Belgium
- Occupations: Writer, translator, teacher
- Writing career
- Language: Flemish
- Years active: 1909–1947

Frans Verschoren (5 March 1874 – 5 December 1951) was a Flemish writer.

== Biography ==
He was born in Sint-Katelijne-Waver in 1874. After his studies at the normal school, he became a teacher in Lier and in Turnhout. In Lier he had Felix Timmermans as a pupil. He then also became director of the Walcourt and later Boom state secondary schools. He was the author in particular of tales for young people. He died in Westmalle, Belgium, in 1951.

== Bibliography ==
- Dompelaars (1909)
- Uit het Nethedal (1909)
- Jeugd (1910)
- Zonnig leven (1912)
- Langs kleine wegen (1912)
- Het gemartelde Lier. De eerste oorlogsjaren in het land van Sint-Gommarus (1919)
- Vlaamsche humor (1922)
- Onnozele kinderdag (1927)
- De dijkgravin (by Marie Gevers, translated from French, 1934)
- Tony Bergmann (1936)
- Verzoening (by Marie Gevers, translated from French, 1942)
- Armantje (by Hermann Claudius, translated from German, 1943)
- Sooike's jeugd (1944)
- Sam in Engeland (by C. Dowman, retold from English, 1946)
- Grijze dagen
- Maandag vieren
- Nonkel Sooi
- Novellen voor de jeugd (together with other authors)
- Van den roover Eyserentant
- Van een jongen die geluk had
