= Marie Gevers =

Belgian novelist (1883–1975)

- Born: 30 December 1883; Edegem, Belgium
- Died: 9 March 1975 (aged 91); Edegem, Belgium
- Occupation: novelist

Marie Gevers (30 December 1883 – 9 March 1975) was a Belgian novelist who wrote in the French language.

She was born in Edegem, near Antwerp. Educated by her mother, she had a special interest in literature. Very early in life, she composed bucolic poetry, encouraged by Verhaeren. Married in 1908 to Jan Frans Willems and mother of Paul Willems, she dedicated her entire life to her family. In fact, one of the distinctive traits of her poetry was the love of her origins and familial roots.

In 1917 her first anthology, Missenbourg, was published. Later, around 1930, she began to focus on writing in prose: Madame Orpha ou la sérénade de mai (1933), Guldentop (1934) and La ligne de vie (1937) continue this constant interest in the little people and life in Antwerp. Marie Gevers was the first woman to be elected to the Académie Royale de Langue et de Littérature Françaises de Belgique (Royal Academy of French Language and Literature in Belgium) in 1938. In 1960, she was awarded the grand quinquennial Prize for French Literature. She died on 9 March 1975.

== Bibliography ==
- Paix sur les champs, roman, Éd. Jacques Antoine, Bruxelles, 1976.
- Plaisir des météores, Éd. Jacques Antoine, Bruxelles, 1978.
- Vie et mort d'un étang, Éd. Jacques Antoine, Bruxelles, 1979.
- Madame Orpha ou la sérénade de mai, roman, Éd. Jacques Antoine, Bruxelles, 1981.
- La ligne de vie, roman, Éd. Jacques Antoine, Bruxelles, 1983.
- La comtesse des digues, roman, Éd. Labor, Bruxelles, 1983, coll. Espace Nord.
- Oeuvres poétiques, poésie, Ed. Le Cri, coll. Terre Neuve, 2004.

== Sources ==
- Marie Gevers (Dutch)
- Marie Gevers (French)
